= 1950 U.S. National Championships – Men's singles =

Men's singles
- 1950 U.S. National Championships

Final
- Champion: (United States) Arthur Larsen
- Runner-up: (United States) Herbie Flam
- Score: 6–3, 4–6, 5–7, 6–4, 6–3

Details
- Draw: 64
- Seeds: 20

Events
Singles	men	women
Doubles	men	women
- U.S. National Championships

Arthur Larsen defeated Herbie Flam 6–3, 4–6, 5–7, 6–4, 6–3 in the final to win the men's singles tennis title at the 1950 U.S. National Championships.

== Seeds ==
The tournament used two lists of ten players for seeding the men's singles event; one for U.S. players and one for foreign players. Arthur Larsen is the champion; others show the round in which they were eliminated.

U.S.

1. (United States) J.E. Patty (first round)
2. (United States) Herbie Flam (finalist)
3. (United States) Gardnar Mulloy (semifinals)
4. (United States) Tom Brown (quarterfinals)
5. (United States) Vic Seixas (third round)
6. (United States) Arthur Larsen (champion)
7. (United States) Earl Cochell (quarterfinals)
8. (United States) Dick Savitt (semifinals)
9. (United States) Bill Talbert (quarterfinals)
10. (United States) James Brink (third round)

Foreign

1. (Australia) Frank Sedgman (third round)
2. (Egypt) Jaroslav Drobný (third round)
3. (Australia) John Bromwich (third round)
4. (Australia) Ken McGregor (first round)
5. (Sweden) Torsten Johansson (third round)
6. (Philippines) Felicisimo Ampon (third round)
7. (Australia) George Worthington (third round)
8. (United Kingdom) Tony Mottram (second round)
9. (Belgium) Philippe Washer (second round)
10. (Mexico) Gustavo Palafox (first round)

== Draw ==
=== Key ===
- Q = Qualifier
- WC = Wild card
- LL = Lucky loser
- r = Retired

=== Final eight ===
Quarterfinals
11	(United States) Arthur Larsen	6	2	6	6
7	(United States) Tom Brown	3	6	1	4
15	(United States) Dick Savitt	8	6	2	6
(United States) Sidney Schwartz	6	2	6	3
13	(United States) Earl Cochell	3	5	2
5	(United States) Gardnar Mulloy	6	7	6
17	(United States) Bill Talbert	7	4	3
3	(United States) Herbie Flam	9	6	6

Semifinals
11	(United States) Arthur Larsen	6	10	7	6
15	(United States) Dick Savitt	2	8	9	2
5	(United States) Gardnar Mulloy	6	2	11	1	3
3	(United States) Herbie Flam	2	6	9	6	6

Final
11	(United States) Arthur Larsen	6	4	5	6	6
3	(United States) Herbie Flam	3	6	7	4	3

=== Earlier rounds ===
==== Section 1 ====
First round
(United States) Beisser	7	7	9	2
4	(Egypt) Drobný	5	9	11	6
(United States) Schreiber	12	6	1	5	2
(Australia) Hopman	10	1	6	7	6
(United States) Reed	4	6	4	11
(Sweden) Davidson	6	4	6	13
(United Kingdom) Horn	3	4	3
11	(United States) Larsen	6	6	6
(United States) Fox	2	2	0
14	(Australia) Worthington	6	6	6
(United States) Brose	2	4	1
(Canada) Rochon	6	6	6
(France) Abdesselam	4	4	7
(United States) Golden	6	6	9
(United States) Tuero	6	4	1	4
7	(United States) Brown	1	6	6	6

Second round
4	(Egypt) Drobný	9	6	6
(Australia) Hopman	7	3	1
(Sweden) Davidson	4	4	6	4
11	(United States) Larsen	6	6	4	6
14	(Australia) Worthington	3	3	6	10	7
(Canada) Rochon	6	6	0	8	5
(United States) Golden	3	3	2
7	(United States) Brown	6	6	6

Third round
4	(Egypt) Drobný	3	6	2	5
11	(United States) Larsen	6	2	6	7
14	(Australia) Worthington	2	6	1	5
7	(United States) Brown	6	1	6	7

Quarterfinals
11	(United States) Larsen	3	6	1	4
7	(United States) Brown	6	2	6	6

==== Section 2 ====
First round
(United States) Trabert	4	0	5
6	(Australia) Bromwich	6	6	7
(Canada) Macken	2	5	1
(United States) Moylan	6	7	6
(United States) Richards	7	3	3	5
(Australia) Rose	5	6	6	7
(United States) Saul	w/o
15	(United States) Savitt
(Canada) Main	7	3	5	4
12	(Philippines) Ampon	5	6	7	6
(Sweden) Eliaeson	2	2	4
(United States) Match	6	6	6
20	(Mexico) Palafox	2	4	4
(United States) Schwartz	6	6	6
1	(United States) Patty	w/o
(United States) Devoe

Second round
6	(Australia) Bromwich	6	6	1	6
(United States) Moylan	3	4	6	4
(Australia) Rose	4	2	4
15	(United States) Savitt	6	6	6
12	(Philippines) Ampon	6	6	6
(United States) Match	2	4	1
(United States) Schwartz	6	21	6
(United States) Devoe	4	19	3

Third round
6	(Australia) Bromwich	6	0	6	2	3
15	(United States) Savitt	3	6	4	6	6
12	(Philippines) Ampon	6	2	8	5
(United States) Schwartz	4	6	10	7

Quarterfinals
15	(United States) Savitt	8	6	2	6
(United States) Schwartz	6	2	6	3

==== Section 3 ====
First round
(United States) Burrows	6	3	5	8
2	(Australia) Sedgman	3	6	7	10
(Belgium) Brichant	8	3	1
(United States) Clark	10	6	6
(United States) Masterson	4	2	5
(United States) Likas	6	6	7
(United States) Fisher	1	3	0
13	(United States) Cochell	6	6	6
(United States) Gaines	3	3	8	2
10	(Sweden) Johansson	6	6	6	6
(United States) Behrens	3	6	3	3
(United States) Richardson	6	1	6	6
(United States) Shea	3	6	7	2	1
(United States) Stewart	6	3	5	6	6
(United States) Vincent	4	0	1
5	(United States) Mulloy	6	6	6

Second round
2	(Australia) Sedgman	4	6	7	3	7
(United States) Clark	6	3	5	6	5
(United States) Likas	0	1	2
13	(United States) Cochell	6	6	6
10	(Sweden) Johansson	7	4	6	6
(United States) Richardson	5	6	4	3
(United States) Stewart	1	2	1
5	(United States) Mulloy	6	6	6

Third round
2	(Australia) Sedgman	5	7	6	2	2
13	(United States) Cochell	7	5	1	6	6
10	(Sweden) Johansson	4	2	2
5	(United States) Mulloy	6	6	6

Quarterfinals
13	(United States) Cochell	3	5	2
5	(United States) Mulloy	6	7	6

==== Section 4 ====
First round
8	(Australia) McGregor	7	6	4	1
(United States) McNeill	9	3	6	6
(United States) Shields	1	6	1	2
17	(United States) Talbert	6	3	6	6
(United States) Martin	3	3	2
(Chile) Balbiers	6	6	6
(United States) Paton	1	0	1
9	(United States) Seixas	6	6	6
(United States) Ganzenmuller	0	4	3
16	(United Kingdom) Mottram	6	6	6
(France) Ducos De La Haille	1	5	7	6	4
19	(United States) Brink	6	7	5	3	6
(United States) Ball	6	3	4
18	(Belgium) Washer	8	6	6
(United States) Bogley	6	4	1	4
3	(United States) Flam	3	6	6	6

Second round
(United States) McNeill	1	6	5	0
17	(United States) Talbert	6	4	7	6
(Chile) Balbiers	3	2	3
9	(United States) Seixas	6	6	6
16	(United Kingdom) Mottram	4	6	3	6	3
19	(United States) Brink	6	4	6	4	6
18	(Belgium) Washer	1	4	8	4
3	(United States) Flam	6	6	6	6

Third round
17	(United States) Talbert	6	2	3	6	6
9	(United States) Seixas	1	6	6	2	3
19	(United States) Brink	4	3	3
3	(United States) Flam	6	6	6

Quarterfinals
17	(United States) Talbert	7	4	3
3	(United States) Flam	9	6	6

Preceded by 1950 Wimbledon Championships – Men's singles	Grand Slam men's singles	Succeeded by 1951 Australian Championships – Men's singles
