= 1949 U.S. National Championships – Men's singles =

Men's singles
- 1949 U.S. National Championships

Final
- Champion: (United States) Pancho Gonzales
- Runner-up: (United States) Ted Schroeder
- Score: 16–18, 2–6, 6–1, 6–2, 6–4

Details
- Draw: 64
- Seeds: 20

Events
Singles	men	women
Doubles	men	women
- U.S. National Championships

Pancho Gonzales defeated Ted Schroeder 16–18, 2–6, 6–1, 6–2, 6–4 in the final to win the men's singles tennis title at the 1949 U.S. National Championships.

== Seeds ==
The tournament used two lists of ten players for seeding the men's singles event; one for U.S. players and one for foreign players. Pancho Gonzales is the champion; others show the round in which they were eliminated.

U.S.

1. (United States) Ted Schroeder (finalist)
2. (United States) Pancho Gonzales (champion)
3. (United States) Bill Talbert (semifinals)
4. (United States) Gardnar Mulloy (quarterfinals)
5. (United States) Frank Parker (semifinals)
6. (United States) Arthur Larsen (quarterfinals)
7. (United States) Earl Cochell (third round)
8. (United States) Herbie Flam (first round)
9. (United States) Vic Seixas (first round)
10. (United States) Samuel Match (third round)

Foreign

1. (South Africa) Eric Sturgess (third round)
2. (Czechoslovakia) Jaroslav Drobný (quarterfinals)
3. (Australia) Frank Sedgman (quarterfinals)
4. (Australia) John Bromwich (third round)
5. (Italy) Giovanni Cucelli (second round)
6. (Philippines) Felicisimo Ampon (third round)
7. (France) Robert Abdesselam (third round)
8. (Italy) Marcello Del Bello (second round)
9. (Australia) George Worthington (first round)
10. (Czechoslovakia) Vladimír Černík (second round)

== Draw ==
=== Key ===
- Q = Qualifier
- WC = Wild card
- LL = Lucky loser
- r = Retired

=== Final eight ===
Quarterfinals
4	(Czechoslovakia) Jaroslav Drobný	4	2	2
5	(United States) Bill Talbert	6	6	6
6	(Australia) Frank Sedgman	3	6	4	8	4
1	(United States) Ted Schroeder	6	0	6	6	6
9	(United States) Frank Parker	6	6	6
7	(United States) Gardnar Mulloy	4	2	4
11	(United States) Arthur Larsen	6	1	3	6	1
3	(United States) Pancho Gonzales	4	6	6	2	6

Semifinals
5	(United States) Bill Talbert	6	4	6	4	4
1	(United States) Ted Schroeder	2	6	4	6	6
9	(United States) Frank Parker	6	7	3	2
3	(United States) Pancho Gonzales	3	9	6	6

Final
1	(United States) Ted Schroeder	18	6	1	2	4
3	(United States) Pancho Gonzales	16	2	6	6	6

=== Earlier rounds ===
==== Section 1 ====
First round
(Canada) Rochon	1	1	0
4	(Czechoslovakia) Drobný	6	6	6
(Italy) Quintavalle	5	0	0
(United States) Stewart	7	6	6
(United States) Roddey	6	5	6	6	5
(United States) Behrens	8	7	3	4	7
(United States) Ball	1	2	0
13	(United States) Cochell	6	6	6
(United States) Bogley	3	0	5
14	(France) Abdesselam	6	6	7
(Czechoslovakia) Hecht	3	2	3
(United States) Burrows	6	6	6
(India) Kumar	6	2	4	4
(United States) Saul	4	6	6	6
(United States) Kovaleski	9	4	3	2
5	(United States) Talbert	7	6	6	6

Second round
4	(Czechoslovakia) Drobný	4	6	6	6
(United States) Stewart	6	4	3	2
(United States) Behrens	1	3	5
13	(United States) Cochell	6	6	7
14	(France) Abdesselam	12	6	1	2	6
(United States) Burrows	10	4	6	6	3
(United States) Saul	4	4	3
5	(United States) Talbert	6	6	6

Third round
4	(Czechoslovakia) Drobný	6	6	8
13	(United States) Cochell	3	2	6
14	(France) Abdesselam	1	1	2
5	(United States) Talbert	6	6	6

Quarterfinals
4	(Czechoslovakia) Drobný	4	2	2
5	(United States) Talbert	6	6	6

==== Section 2 ====
First round
(United States) Harris	7	4	3	2
6	(Australia) Sedgman	5	6	6	6
(United Kingdom) Lewis	4	6	6	3	1
(United States) Shields	6	4	3	6	6
(United States) Ganzenmuller	7	3	5
(United States) Shea	9	6	7
15	(United States) Flam	4	4	3
(United States) Moylan	6	6	6
(United States) Mateer	6	2	4	4
10	(Italy) Cucelli	2	6	6	6
(France) Rémy	2	4	1
19	(United States) Match	6	6	6
(Canada) Macken	1	1	11	3
20	(Czechoslovakia) Černík	6	6	9	6
(United States) Oliver	3	4	2
1	(United States) Schroeder	6	6	6

Second round
6	(Australia) Sedgman	6	11	6
(United States) Shields	1	9	3
(United States) Shea	6	12	1	2
(United States) Moylan	3	14	6	6
10	(Italy) Cucelli	0	5	1
19	(United States) Match	6	7	6
20	(Czechoslovakia) Černík	6	3	2
1	(United States) Schroeder	8	6	6

Third round
6	(Australia) Sedgman	6	6	10
(United States) Moylan	3	2	8
19	(United States) Match	3	2	2
1	(United States) Schroeder	6	6	6

Quarterfinals
6	(Australia) Sedgman	3	6	4	8	4
1	(United States) Schroeder	6	0	6	6	6

==== Section 3 ====
First round
(United States) Golden	1	2	2
2	(South Africa) Sturgess	6	6	6
(United States) Taylor	7	4	0	2
(United States) Schwartz	5	6	6	6
(United Kingdom) Oakley	1	2	2
(United States) Masterson	6	6	6
(Italy) Canepele	2	1	1
9	(United States) Parker	6	6	6
(United States) Wood	2	0	7
12	(Philippines) Ampon	6	6	9
(United States) Greenberg	w/o
(United States) Steiner
18	(Australia) Worthington	2	2	6
(United States) Trabert	6	6	8
(United States) Tuero	6	3	0
7	(United States) Mulloy	8	6	6

Second round
2	(South Africa) Sturgess	6	6	6
(United States) Schwartz	3	0	2
(United States) Masterson	2	1	1
9	(United States) Parker	6	6	6
12	(Philippines) Ampon	6	6	6
(United States) Steiner	1	3	4
(United States) Trabert	12	2	1	3
7	(United States) Mulloy	10	6	6	6

Third round
2	(South Africa) Sturgess	3	8	1	4
9	(United States) Parker	6	6	6	6
12	(Philippines) Ampon	3	2	0
7	(United States) Mulloy	6	6	6

Quarterfinals
9	(United States) Parker	6	6	6
7	(United States) Mulloy	4	2	4

==== Section 4 ====
First round
(South Africa) Fannin	2	1	3
8	(Australia) Bromwich	6	6	6
(United States) Hippenstiel	8	2	6	2	3
(United States) Paton	6	6	3	6	6
(Chile) Balbiers	1	3	1
(United States) Dorfman	6	6	6
(United States) Devoe	1	6	3	6	3
11	(United States) Larsen	6	3	6	3	6
(United States) Vogt	4	4	4
16	(Italy) Del Bello	6	6	6
17	(United States) Seixas	6	6	3	5	4
(United States) Brink	3	0	6	7	6
(United States) Savitt	6	5	3	1
(United States) Clark	1	7	6	6
(United States) Geller	0	1	2
3	(United States) Gonzales	6	6	6

Second round
8	(Australia) Bromwich	6	6	6
(United States) Paton	2	0	0
(United States) Dorfman	6	5	6	5
11	(United States) Larsen	8	7	4	7
16	(Italy) Del Bello	4	0	1
(United States) Brink	6	6	6
(United States) Clark	4	5	5
3	(United States) Gonzales	6	7	7

Third round
8	(Australia) Bromwich	6	9	2	4	4
11	(United States) Larsen	3	7	6	6	6
(United States) Brink	4	4	4
3	(United States) Gonzales	6	6	6

Quarterfinals
11	(United States) Larsen	6	1	3	6	1
3	(United States) Gonzales	4	6	6	2	6

Preceded by 1949 Wimbledon Championships – Men's singles	Grand Slam men's singles	Succeeded by 1950 Australian Championships – Men's singles
