= 1948 U.S. National Championships – Men's singles =

Men's singles
- 1948 U.S. National Championships

Final
- Champion: (United States) Pancho Gonzales
- Runner-up: (South Africa) Eric Sturgess
- Score: 6–2, 6–3, 14–12

Events
Singles	men	women
Doubles	men	women
- U.S. National Championships

Pancho Gonzales defeated Eric Sturgess 6–2, 6–3, 14–12 in the final to win the men's singles tennis title at the 1948 U.S. National Championships.

== Seeds ==
The tournament used two lists of eight players for seeding the men's singles event; one for U.S. players and one for foreign players. Pancho Gonzales is the champion; others show the round in which they were eliminated.

U.S.

1. (United States) Frank Parker (quarterfinals)
2. (United States) Bill Talbert (fourth round)
3. (United States) Gardnar Mulloy (fourth round)
4. (United States) Bob Falkenburg (quarterfinals)
5. (United States) Earl Cochell (quarterfinals)
6. (United States) Harry Likas (quarterfinals)
7. (United States) Vic Seixas (fourth round)
8. (United States) Pancho Gonzales (champion)

Foreign

1. (Australia) Adrian Quist (fourth round)
2. (Czechoslovakia) Jaroslav Drobný (semifinals)
3. (Australia) Bill Sidwell (third round)
4. (Australia) Geoffrey Brown (second round)
5. (South Africa) Eric Sturgess (finalist)
6. (Australia) Colin Long (second round)
7. (Australia) Frank Sedgman (fourth round)
8. (Argentina) Enrique Morea (third round)

== Draw ==
=== Key ===
- Q = Qualifier
- WC = Wild card
- LL = Lucky loser
- r = Retired

=== Final eight ===
Quarterfinals
1	(United States) Frank Parker	6	6	5	3
15	(United States) Pancho Gonzales	8	2	7	6
7	(United States) Bob Falkenburg	6	1	3
4	(Czechoslovakia) Jaroslav Drobný	8	6	6
10	(South Africa) Eric Sturgess	6	8	3	5	6
9	(United States) Earl Cochell	2	6	6	7	3
(United States) Herbie Flam	2	6	6	6
11	(United States) Harry Likas	6	4	1	0

Semifinals
15	(United States) Pancho Gonzales	8	11	6	6
4	(Czechoslovakia) Jaroslav Drobný	10	9	0	3
10	(South Africa) Eric Sturgess	9	6	6
(United States) Herbie Flam	7	3	2

Final
15	(United States) Pancho Gonzales	6	6	14
10	(South Africa) Eric Sturgess	2	3	12

=== Earlier rounds ===
==== Section 1 ====
First round

Second round
1	(United States) Parker	6	6	6
(United States) Bogley	2	1	0
(Mexico) Palafox	w/o
(United States) Lohstoeter
(United States) Paton	6	5	3	6	6
(United States) Bicknell	4	7	6	3	2
(United States) Morris	4	2	2
14	(Australia) Sedgman	6	6	6

Third round
1	(United States) Parker	6	6	6
(United States) Lohstoeter	0	1	0
(United States) Paton	2	11	2
14	(Australia) Sedgman	6	13	6

Fourth round
1	(United States) Parker	6	7	6
14	(Australia) Sedgman	4	5	3

==== Section 2 ====
First round

Second round
15	(United States) Gonzales	8	6	6
(Czechoslovakia) Hecht	6	3	1
(United States) Bostick	8	3	6	6	6
(United States) Ganzenmuller	6	6	4	8	8
(United States) Larsen	7	2	3	6	7
(United States) Molloy	5	6	6	4	5
(Norway) Lie	0	3	3
6	(Australia) Sidwell	6	6	6

Third round
15	(United States) Gonzales	6	6	6
(United States) Ganzenmuller	3	2	3
(United States) Larsen	4	6	8	6
6	(Australia) Sidwell	6	2	6	4

Fourth round
15	(United States) Gonzales	6	2	3	6	6
(United States) Larsen	2	6	6	3	2

==== Section 3 ====
First round
(United States) Patty	6	6	6	6
(United Kingdom) Mottram	4	8	1	3
(United States) Saul	8	8	6
(United States) Burrows	6	6	3
(United States) Carter	6	6	6
(United States) Carver	1	3	4
(Canada) Rochon	6	8	6
(United States) Mattmann	3	6	3
(United States) Brown	6	6	6	6
(United States) Brink	3	8	3	2
12	(Australia) Long	6	8	6
(United States) Mateer	3	6	4

Second round
7	(United States) Falkenburg	6	1	6	6
(United States) Richards	4	6	3	3
(United States) Patty	6	6	6
(United States) Saul	3	4	3
(United States) Carter	6	7	6
(Canada) Rochon	3	5	0
(United States) Brown	6	6	6
12	(Australia) Long	2	3	4

Third round
7	(United States) Falkenburg	6	4	3	6	10
(United States) Patty	1	6	6	4	8
(United States) Carter	6	6	6
(United States) Brown	4	3	4

Fourth round
7	(United States) Falkenburg	8	6	6
(United States) Carter	6	3	4

==== Section 4 ====
First round
13	(United States) Seixas	6	6	6
(United States) McGrath	2	3	1
(United States) Match	6	6	6
(Romania) Rurac	0	0	3
(United States) Roddey	6	6	6
(United States) Lynch	2	1	1
(United States) Vogt	6	8	6
(United States) Behrens	4	6	4
(United States) Schwartz	6	0	6	5	6
(United States) Bellis	0	6	4	7	2
(United States) Shea	3	14	6	6	6
(United States) Hoffman	6	16	3	3	1
(United States) Bartzen	6	6	6
(United States) Dorfman	0	2	4
4	(Czechoslovakia) Drobný	6	6	6
(United States) Vincent	1	1	0

Second round
13	(United States) Seixas	6	6	6
(United States) Match	3	0	4
(United States) Roddey	7	6	3	4
(United States) Vogt	9	3	6	6
(United States) Schwartz	4	7	5	3
(United States) Shea	6	5	7	6
(United States) Bartzen	3	2	4
4	(Czechoslovakia) Drobný	6	6	6

Third round
13	(United States) Seixas	6	6	6	5	9
(United States) Vogt	3	8	3	7	7
(United States) Shea	7	4	2	6
4	(Czechoslovakia) Drobný	5	6	6	8

Fourth round
13	(United States) Seixas	4	7	4
4	(Czechoslovakia) Drobný	6	9	6

==== Section 5 ====
First round
3	(United States) Talbert	6	6	4	6
(United States) Welsh	2	1	6	1
(Chile) Balbiers	6	6	3	6
(United States) Hobbs	2	2	6	2
(United States) Garrett	6	7	6
(United States) Tully	3	5	2
(Czechoslovakia) Černík	6	6	6
(United States) Boys	2	2	4
(United States) Savitt	6	6	6
(United States) Geller	1	3	3
(Australia) Hopman	6	6	3	6
(Canada) Macken	2	4	6	3
(United States) Thomas	6	3	6	6
(United States) Hippenstiel	3	6	4	3
10	(South Africa) Sturgess	6	6	6
(United States) Taylor	0	1	2

Second round
3	(United States) Talbert	7	6	6
(Chile) Balbiers	5	2	3
(United States) Garrett	6	6	4	6
(Czechoslovakia) Černík	4	3	6	2
(United States) Savitt	6	6	6
(Australia) Hopman	4	0	2
(United States) Thomas	0	4	2
10	(South Africa) Sturgess	6	6	6

Third round
3	(United States) Talbert	6	6	6
(United States) Garrett	3	2	4
(United States) Savitt	3	4	2
10	(South Africa) Sturgess	6	6	6

Fourth round
3	(United States) Talbert	7	4	2	6	4
10	(South Africa) Sturgess	5	6	6	1	6

==== Section 6 ====
First round
9	(United States) Cochell	6	6	4	6
(United States) Moylan	4	3	6	2
(United States) Kovaleski	6	6	6
(United States) Mouledous	3	1	3
(United States) Steele Jr.	6	6	4	6
(United States) Hall	4	2	6	4
(United States) Trabert	6	6	8
(United States) Kerdasha	1	4	6
(Cuba) Weiss	6	6	4	6
(United States) Hetzeck	2	3	6	3

Second round
9	(United States) Cochell	4	8	4	6	6
(United States) Kovaleski	6	6	6	4	3
(United States) Steele Jr.	3	7	6	3	4
(United States) Trabert	6	5	4	6	6
(Cuba) Weiss	3	4	6	6	6
(United States) Mathey	6	6	2	1	4
(Philippines) Ampon	6	6	3	7
8	(Australia) Brown	1	4	6	5

Third round
9	(United States) Cochell	6	6	3	6
(United States) Trabert	0	3	6	4
(Cuba) Weiss	3	2	4
(Philippines) Ampon	6	6	6

Fourth round
9	(United States) Cochell	6	6	6
(Philippines) Ampon	2	0	2

==== Section 7 ====
First round

Second round
5	(United States) Mulloy	6	6	6
(United States) Massey	2	2	3
(United States) Masterson	5	6	3	7
(United States) Wood	7	1	6	9
(Mexico) Galván	3	2	3
(United States) Flam	6	6	6
(United States) Steiner	3	7	0
16	(Argentina) Morea	6	9	6

Third round
5	(United States) Mulloy	8	6	10
(United States) Wood	6	4	8
(United States) Flam	6	3	6	2	6
16	(Argentina) Morea	3	6	1	6	0

Fourth round
5	(United States) Mulloy	4	5	6	6	3
(United States) Flam	6	7	3	4	6

==== Section 8 ====
First round

Second round
11	(United States) Likas	6	6	7
(France) Abdesselam	3	2	5
(United States) Martin	6	6	6
(United States) Hanna	0	4	4
(United States) Clark	2	9	6	6
(United States) Golden	6	7	1	4
(United States) Shields	2	1	6	4
2	(Australia) Quist	6	6	2	6

Third round
11	(United States) Likas	6	6	6
(United States) Martin	2	4	4
(United States) Clark	5	6	3
2	(Australia) Quist	7	8	6

Fourth round
11	(United States) Likas	6	6	4	6
2	(Australia) Quist	2	3	6	4

Preceded by 1948 Wimbledon Championships – Men's singles	Grand Slam men's singles	Succeeded by 1949 Australian Championships – Men's singles
