= 1947 U.S. National Championships – Men's singles =

Men's singles
- 1947 U.S. National Championships

Final
- Champion: (United States) Jack Kramer
- Runner-up: (United States) Frank Parker
- Score: 4–6, 2–6, 6–1, 6–0, 6–3

Events
Singles	men	women
Doubles	men	women
- U.S. National Championships

Jack Kramer defeated Frank Parker 4–6, 2–6, 6–1, 6–0, 6–3 in the final to win the men's singles tennis title at the 1947 U.S. National Championships.

== Seeds ==
The seeded players are listed below. Jack Kramer is the champion; others show the round in which they were eliminated.

1. (United States) Jack Kramer (champion)
2. (United States) Frank Parker (finalist)
3. (United States) Tom Brown (quarterfinals)
4. (United States) Gardnar Mulloy (quarterfinals)
5. (United States) Bill Talbert (first round)
6. (Ecuador) Pancho Segura (quarterfinals)
7. (United States) Robert Falkenburg (quarterfinals)
8. (United States) Eddie Moylan (fourth round)
9. (United States) Vic Seixas (fourth round)
10. (United States) Earl Cochell (first round)
1. (Australia) John Bromwich (semifinals)
2. (Czechoslovakia) Jaroslav Drobný (semifinals)
3. (Australia) Dinny Pails (fourth round)
4. (Australia) Colin Long (fourth round)
5. (Sweden) Torsten Johansson (fourth round)
6. (Australia) Geoffrey Brown (fourth round)
7. (Australia) Bill Sidwell (third round)
8. (Czechoslovakia) Vladimír Černík (third round)
9. (Argentina) Enrique Morea (third round)
10. (France) Bernard Destremau (third round)

== Draw ==
=== Key ===
- Q = Qualifier
- WC = Wild card
- LL = Lucky loser
- r = Retired

=== Finals ===
Quarterfinals
1	(United States) Jack Kramer	6	7	6
7	(United States) Robert Falkenburg	2	5	1
3	(United States) Tom Brown	5	3	4
(2)	(Czechoslovakia) Jaroslav Drobný	7	6	6
2	(United States) Frank Parker	6	11	6
6	(Ecuador) Pancho Segura	3	9	4
4	(United States) Gardnar Mulloy	5	1	1
(1)	(Australia) John Bromwich	7	6	6

Semifinals
1	(United States) Jack Kramer	3	6	6	6
(2)	(Czechoslovakia) Jaroslav Drobný	6	3	0	1
2	(United States) Frank Parker	6	4	6	6	8
(1)	(Australia) John Bromwich	3	6	3	8	6

Final
1	(United States) Jack Kramer	4	2	6	6	6
2	(United States) Frank Parker	6	6	1	0	3

=== Earlier rounds ===
==== Section 1 ====
First round

Second round
1	(United States) Kramer	6	6	6
(United States) McGrath	0	3	1
(Canada) Macken	0	6	2	4
(9)	(Argentina) Morea	6	3	6	6
(United States) Brink	6	6	6
(United States) Masterson	4	0	2
(New Zealand) McKenzie	6	4	2
(8)	(Czechoslovakia) Černík	8	6	6

Third round
1	(United States) Kramer	6	6	6
(9)	(Argentina) Morea	1	1	4
(United States) Brink	6	3	4	6	6
(8)	(Czechoslovakia) Černík	2	6	6	2	3

Fourth round
1	(United States) Kramer	6	3	9	7
(United States) Brink	1	6	7	5

==== Section 2 ====
First round
(United States) Mouledous	6	7	6
(United States) Fisher	3	5	2
(4)	(Australia) Long	6	6	6
(United States) Atwater	2	3	4

Second round
7	(United States) Falkenburg	6	6	6
(United States) Steiner	1	3	4
(United States) Larned	w/o
(United States) Likas
(United States) Martin	6	8	2	1
(Chile) Balbiers	4	10	6	6
(United States) Mouledous	2	2	4
(4)	(Australia) Long	6	6	6

Third round
7	(United States) Falkenburg	4	6	6	4	6
(United States) Likas	6	2	3	6	4
(Chile) Balbiers	4	2	4
(4)	(Australia) Long	6	6	6

Fourth round
7	(United States) Falkenburg	4	6	6	6	6
(4)	(Australia) Long	6	8	3	2	4

==== Section 3 ====
First round
3	(United States) Brown	10	4	6	6
(United States) Steele Jr.	8	6	1	2
(United States) Hart	6	6	6
(United States) Davis	0	0	1
(United States) Kovaleski	6	6	6
(United Kingdom) Slack	0	4	4
(United States) Shields	6	6	6
(United Kingdom) Mottram	3	4	4
(United States) Dorfman	6	3	6	7
10	(United States) Cochell	3	6	3	5
(United States) Heldman	4	6	6	6
(United States) Wood	6	4	4	2
(United States) Vogt	6	6	6
(Canada) Macken	3	2	4
(6)	(Australia) Brown	6	6	6
(United States) McCarthy	4	1	3

Second round
3	(United States) Brown	7	6	6
(United States) Hart	5	0	2
(United States) Kovaleski	13	3	4	6	6
(United States) Shields	11	6	6	3	4
(United States) Dorfman	6	6	3	6
(United States) Heldman	4	4	6	4
(United States) Vogt	4	7	5
(6)	(Australia) Brown	6	9	7

Third round
3	(United States) Brown	6	6	6	6
(United States) Kovaleski	4	0	8	2
(United States) Dorfman	1	3	9	6	2
(6)	(Australia) Brown	6	6	7	4	6

Fourth round
3	(United States) T Brown	7	4	10	6
(6)	(Australia) G Brown	5	6	8	1

==== Section 4 ====
First round
(United States) Flam	9	1
5	(United States) Talbert	11	0	r
(United States) Mattmann	6	6	6
(India) Mohan	2	0	1
(United States) Molloy	6	1	6	6
(United States) Paul	4	6	1	3
(United States) Match	6	6	7
(United States) Carver	1	3	5
(Brazil) Vieira	6	6	6
(United States) Hetzeck	3	1	0
(United States) Behrens	9	6	5	6
(United States) Mathey	7	0	7	3
(United States) Bowden	3	6	6	6
(United States) Thackara	6	4	1	3
(2)	(Czechoslovakia) Drobný	9	6	7
(United States) Benham	7	4	5

Second round
(United States) Flam	6	6	6
(United States) Mattmann	1	1	3
(United States) Molloy	2	6	4	3
(United States) Match	6	0	6	6
(Brazil) Vieira	6	2	6	7	4
(United States) Behrens	4	6	2	9	6
(United States) Bowden	4	4	3
(2)	(Czechoslovakia) Drobný	6	6	6

Third round
(United States) Flam	6	6	2	6
(United States) Match	1	2	6	2
(United States) Behrens	2	6	1
(2)	(Czechoslovakia) Drobný	6	8	6

Fourth round
(United States) Flam	6	2	1	4
(2)	(Czechoslovakia) Drobný	2	6	6	6

==== Section 5 ====
First round
2	(United States) Parker	6	6
(United States) Taylor	2	1
(Czechoslovakia) Hecht
(Mexico) Vega	w/o
(United Kingdom) Paish	6	6	6
(Australia) Crawford	0	1	4
(10)	(France) Destremau	3	6	8	6
(United States) Stewart	6	4	6	3
9	(United States) Seixas	6	6	7
(United States) Tuero	4	0	5
(United States) Beisser	6	7	6
(United States) Daniel	2	5	2
(United States) Paton	7	7	13
(United States) Hanna	5	5	11
(7)	(Australia) Sidwell	6	6	6
(Hong Kong) Ip	0	0	2

Second round
2	(United States) Parker	6	6	6
(Czechoslovakia) Hecht	2	4	4
(United Kingdom) Paish	4	6	4	2
(10)	(France) Destremau	6	3	6	6
9	(United States) Seixas	6	6	6
(United States) Beisser	3	2	2
(United States) Paton	5	3	2
(7)	(Australia) Sidwell	7	6	6

Third round
2	(United States) Parker	6	6	6
(10)	(France) Destremau	0	2	3
9	(United States) Seixas	3	6	4	6	6
(7)	(Australia) Sidwell	6	3	6	0	4

Fourth round
2	(United States) Parker	6	4	6	6
9	(United States) Seixas	1	6	3	4

==== Section 6 ====
First round
6	(United States) Segura	6	6	6
(United States) Fishbach	2	1	3
(United States) Savitt	1	6	6	3	6
(United States) Schwartz	6	3	4	6	4
(India) Mehta	6	6	6
(United States) Hall	4	4	1
(United States) Bartzen	6	6	6
(United States) Hollander	4	2	1
(United States) Burrows	3	6	6	6
(United States) Welsh	6	0	4	3
(United States) Carter	4	4	7	6	6
(United States) Burke	6	6	5	0	2
(Romania) Rurac	6	6	6
(United States) Mathey	3	4	2
(3)	(Australia) Pails	6	6	6
(United States) Evert	3	2	1

Second round
6	(United States) Segura	6	6	6
(United States) Savitt	3	1	2
(India) Mehta	4	4	1
(United States) Bartzen	6	6	6
(United States) Burrows	2	3	1
(United States) Carter	6	6	6
(Romania) Rurac	1	4	3
(3)	(Australia) Pails	6	6	6

Third round
6	(United States) Segura	6	6	6	6
(United States) Bartzen	8	1	3	3
(United States) Carter	1	5	2
(3)	(Australia) Pails	6	7	6

Fourth round
6	(United States) Segura	1	6	6	7
(3)	(Australia) Pails	6	1	2	5

==== Section 7 ====
First round
4	(United States) Mulloy	6	6	6
(United States) Grant	3	4	1
(United States) Gonzales	6	6	6
(United Kingdom) Barton	3	0	3

Second round
4	(United States) Mulloy	6	6	2	9	6
(United States) Gonzales	3	2	6	11	4
(United Kingdom) Olliff	1	6	0	7
(India) Misra	6	2	6	9
(United States) Greenberg
(Mexico) Vega	w/o
(United States) Geller	7	4	0
(5)	(Sweden) Johansson	9	6	6

Third round
4	(United States) Mulloy	6	6	9
(India) Misra	3	2	7
(United States) Greenberg	3	3	6	1
(5)	(Sweden) Johansson	6	6	1	6

Fourth round
4	(United States) Mulloy	6	6	6
(5)	(Sweden) Johansson	3	2	3

==== Section 8 ====
First round

Second round
8	(United States) Moylan	9	6	6
(France) Abdesselam	7	4	1
(United States) Roddey	6	6	6
(United States) Dixon	2	1	2
(Canada) Rochon	6	6	7
(Belgium) Peten	2	3	5
(United States) Pero	5	3	1
(1)	(Australia) Bromwich	7	6	6

Third round
8	(United States) Moylan	6	6	6
(United States) Roddey	1	1	1
(Canada) Rochon	1	0	1
(1)	(Australia) Bromwich	6	6	6

Fourth round
8	(United States) Moylan	2	1	2
(1)	(Australia) Bromwich	6	6	6

Preceded by 1947 French Championships – Men's singles	Grand Slam men's singles	Succeeded by 1948 Australian Championships – Men's singles
