= 1950 U.S. National Championships (tennis) =

- Date: 25 August – 5 September
- Edition: 70th
- Category: Grand Slam (ILTF)
- Surface: Grass
- Location: Chestnut Hill, Massachusetts; Forest Hills, Queens, New York City; United States
- Venue: Longwood Cricket Club; West Side Tennis Club

Champions

Men's singles
- (United States) Art Larsen

Women's singles
- (United States) Margaret Osborne duPont

Men's doubles
- (Australia) John Bromwich / (Australia) Frank Sedgman

Women's doubles
- (United States) Louise Brough / (United States) Margaret Osborne

Mixed doubles
- (United States) Margaret Osborne duPont / (Australia) Ken McGregor
- U.S. National Championships

The 1950 U.S. National Championships (now known as the US Open) was a tennis tournament that took place on the outdoor grass courts at the West Side Tennis Club, Forest Hills in New York City, New York. The tournament ran from 25 August until 5 September. It was the 70th staging of the U.S. National Championships, and the fourth Grand Slam tennis event of the year. A highlight of that year's tournament was Margaret Osborne du Pont's triple crown.

== Finals ==
=== Men's singles ===
(United States) Art Larsen defeated (United States) Herb Flam 6–3, 4–6, 5–7, 6–4, 6–3

=== Women's singles ===
(United States) Margaret Osborne duPont defeated (United States) Doris Hart 6–3, 6–3

=== Men's doubles ===
(Australia) John Bromwich / (Australia) Frank Sedgman defeated (United States) Bill Talbert / (United States) Gardnar Mulloy 7–5, 8–6, 3–6, 6–1

=== Women's doubles ===
(United States) Louise Brough / (United States) Margaret Osborne duPont defeated (United States) Shirley Fry / (United States) Doris Hart 6–2, 6–3

=== Mixed doubles ===
(United States) Margaret Osborne duPont / (Australia) Ken McGregor defeated (United States) Doris Hart / (Australia) Frank Sedgman 6–4, 3–6, 6–3

Preceded by 1950 Wimbledon Championships	Grand Slams	Succeeded by 1951 Australian Championships
