= 1942 U.S. National Championships – Men's singles =

Men's singles
- 1942 U.S. National Championships

Final
- Champion: (United States) Ted Schroeder
- Runner-up: (United States) Frank Parker
- Score: 8–6, 7–5, 3–6, 4–6, 6–2

Events
Singles	men	women
Doubles	men	women
- U.S. National Championships

Ted Schroeder defeated Frank Parker 8–6, 7–5, 3–6, 4–6, 6–2 in the final to win the men's singles tennis title at the 1942 U.S. National Championships.

== Seeds ==
The seeded players are listed below. Ted Schroeder is the champion; others show the round in which they were eliminated.

1. (United States) Ted Schroeder (champion)
2. (United States) Frank Parker (finalist)
3. (United States) Gardnar Mulloy (semifinals)
4. (United States) Bill Talbert (quarterfinals)
5. n/a
6. (United States) Sidney Wood (third round)
7. (United States) Seymour Greenberg (quarterfinals)
8. (United States) Harris Everett (third round)
9. (United States) George Richards (quarterfinals)
.
1. (Ecuador) Pancho Segura (semifinals)
2. (Czechoslovakia) Ladislav Hecht (third round)
3. (Argentina) Alejo Russell (quarterfinals)

== Draw ==
=== Key ===
- Q = Qualifier
- WC = Wild card
- LL = Lucky loser
- r = Retired

=== Final eight ===
Quarterfinals
8	(United States) George Richards	2	6	5
3	(United States) Gardnar Mulloy	6	8	7
(3)	(Argentina) Alejo Russell	3	8	3	5
1	(United States) Ted Schroeder	6	6	6	7
(1)	(Ecuador) Pancho Segura	6	3	6	6
4	(United States) Bill Talbert	4	6	2	4
6	(United States) Seymour Greenberg	0	0	4
2	(United States) Frank Parker	6	6	6

Semifinals
3	(United States) Gardnar Mulloy	7	3	4
1	(United States) Ted Schroeder	9	6	6
(1)	(Ecuador) Pancho Segura	1	1	6	2
2	(United States) Frank Parker	6	6	2	6

Final
1	(United States) Ted Schroeder	8	7	3	4	6
2	(United States) Frank Parker	6	5	6	6	2

=== Earlier rounds ===
==== Section 1 ====
First round
(United States) Krais	0	2	2
(2)	(Czechoslovakia) Hecht	6	6	6
(United States) Falkenburg	6	4	6	4	4
(Republic of Ireland) Lyttleton-Rogers	2	6	4	6	6
(United States) Taylor	1	0	1
(United States) Ball	6	6	6
(United States) Dorfman	3	3	4
8	(United States) Richards	6	6	6
(United States) Smith	4	4	1
(United States) Brown	6	6	6
(United States) Anthony	w/o
(United States) Schnaars
(United States) Ganzenmuller	1	1	4
(United States) Bellis	6	6	6
(United States) Macdonald	3	0	6
3	(United States) Mulloy	6	6	8

Second round
(2)	(Czechoslovakia) Hecht	8	6	6
(Republic of Ireland) Lyttleton-Rogers	6	2	2
(United States) Ball	5	5	2
8	(United States) Richards	7	7	6
(United States) Brown	7	5	6	6	6
(United States) Schnaars	9	7	0	3	4
(United States) Bellis	3	3	1
3	(United States) Mulloy	6	6	6

Third round
(2)	(Czechoslovakia) Hecht	2	6	6	10	2
8	(United States) Richards	6	3	0	12	6
(United States) Brown	0	3	6	7	1
3	(United States) Mulloy	6	6	4	5	6

Quarterfinals
8	(United States) Richards	2	6	5
3	(United States) Mulloy	6	8	7

==== Section 2 ====
First round
(United States) Larned	w/o
(3)	(Argentina) Russell
(United States) Crowther	5	3	7
(United States) Falkenburg	7	6	9
(United States) McCall	4	2	6	2
(United States) Masterson	6	6	1	6
(United States) Brink	7	5	0	6	0
5	(United States) Wood	5	7	6	3	6
(United States) Adair	3	9	0
(United States) Odman	6	11	6
(United States) Gray	0	4	0
(United States) Evert	6	6	6
(United States) Moylan	4	10	7	1	1
(United States) Hunt	6	8	5	6	6
(United States) Bobbitt	5	2	6
1	(United States) Schroeder	7	6	8

Second round
(3)	(Argentina) Russell	5	6	3	6	6
(United States) Falkenburg	7	3	6	1	2
(United States) Masterson	1	3	6	4
5	(United States) Wood	6	6	3	6
(United States) Odman	3	1	5
(United States) Evert	6	6	7
(United States) Hunt	0	1	1
1	(United States) Schroeder	6	6	6

Third round
(3)	(Argentina) Russell	5	7	6	6
5	(United States) Wood	7	5	4	4
(United States) Evert	5	11	4	4
1	(United States) Schroeder	7	9	6	6

Quarterfinals
(3)	(Argentina) Russell	3	8	3	5
1	(United States) Schroeder	6	6	6	7

==== Section 3 ====
First round
(United States) Edward	7	3	1
(1)	(Ecuador) Segura	9	6	6
(United States) Mabry	7	6	5
(Peru) Buse	9	8	7
(United States) Daniels	3	6	1	1
(United States) Hall	6	3	6	6
(United States) Gilbert	1	0	1
7	(United States) Everett	6	6	6
(United States) O'Loughlin	4	4	4
(United States) Slack	6	6	6
(United States) Kerdasha	3	6	3
(United States) Paul	6	8	6
(United States) Bowden	4	2	7
(United States) Seixas	6	6	9
(United States) Tully	1	0	2
4	(United States) Talbert	6	6	6

Second round
(1)	(Ecuador) Segura	6	6	6
(Peru) Buse	1	2	2
(United States) Hall	2	3	8
7	(United States) Everett	6	6	10
(United States) Slack	6	0	5	4
(United States) Paul	4	6	7	6
(United States) Seixas	3	2	6
4	(United States) Talbert	6	6	8

Third round
(1)	(Ecuador) Segura	6	6	6
7	(United States) Everett	0	1	2
(United States) Paul	3	2	4
4	(United States) Talbert	6	6	6

Quarterfinals
(1)	(Ecuador) Segura	4	6	2	4
4	(United States) Talbert	6	3	6	6

==== Section 4 ====
First round
(United States) Bellows	1	3	6	4
(United States) McKee	6	6	2	6
(United States) Hawley	2	3	5
(United States) Smidl	6	6	7
(United States) Hartman	6	1	3	6	5
(United States) Dixon	3	6	6	3	7
(United States) Mattmann	w/o
6	(United States) Greenberg
(United States) Backe	4	3	4
(United States) Wasserman	6	6	6
(United States) Bennett	6	1	3	0
(United States) Vogt	3	6	6	6
(United States) Kovaleski	6	4	6	6
(United States) Hart	3	6	8	8
(United States) Geller	0	0	0
2	(United States) Parker	6	6	6

Second round
(United States) McKee	3	1	8	7	4
(United States) Smidl	6	6	6	5	6
(United States) Dixon	2	2	1
6	(United States) Greenberg	6	6	6
(United States) Wasserman	1	0	4
(United States) Vogt	6	6	6
(United States) Hart	1	3	5
2	(United States) Parker	6	6	7

Third round
(United States) Smidl	1	1	1
6	(United States) Greenberg	6	6	6
(United States) Vogt	2	0	1
2	(United States) Parker	6	6	6

Quarterfinals
6	(United States) Greenberg	0	0	4
2	(United States) Parker	6	6	6
