= Earl Cochell =

American tennis player (1922–2019)

Earl Harry Cochell
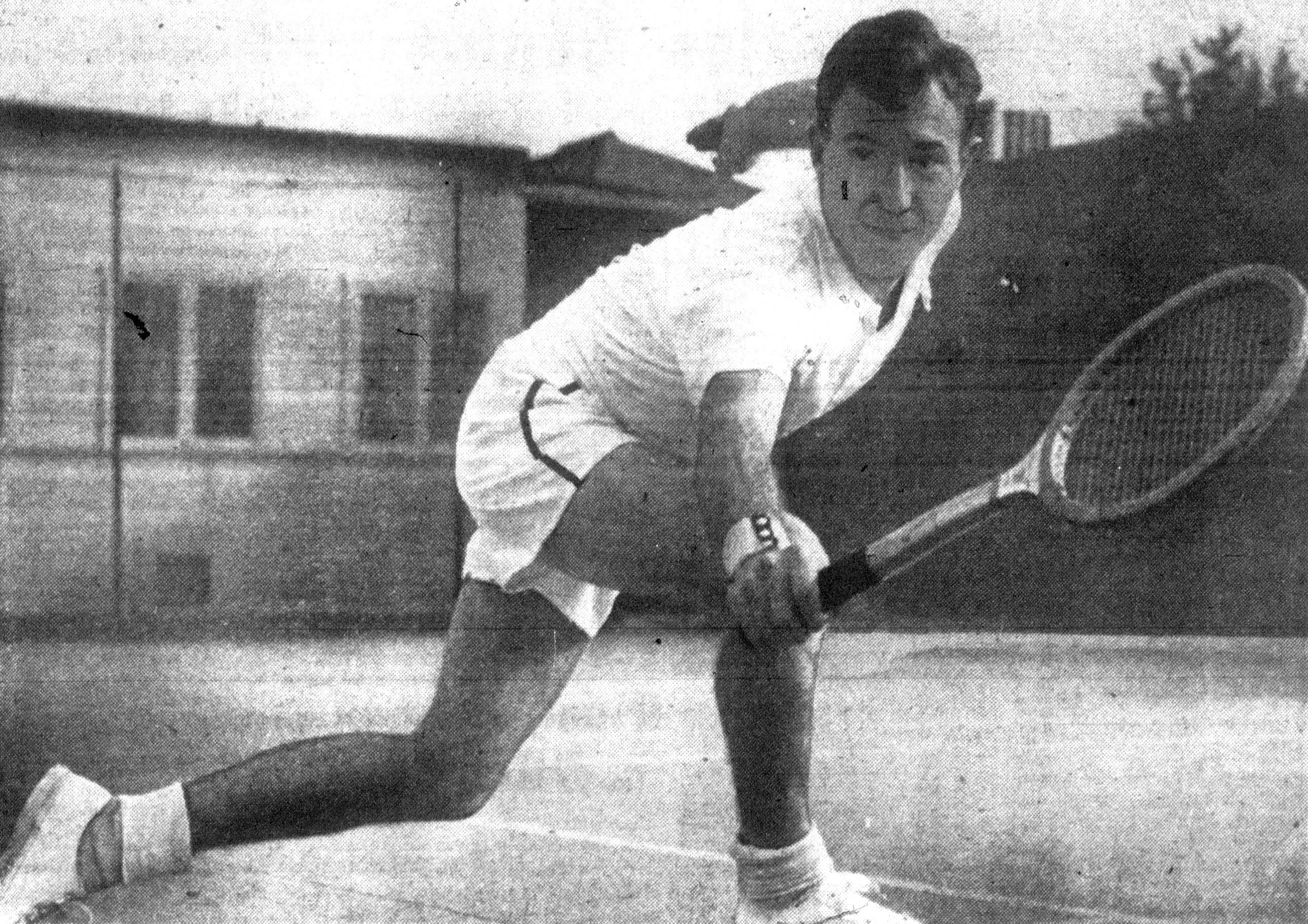
- Cochell, circa 1951
- Country (sports): United States
- Born: May 18, 1922 Sacramento, California, U.S.
- Died: May 18, 2019 (aged 97)
- Turned pro: 1940 (amateur tour)
- Retired: 1951 (banned)

Singles
- Highest ranking: No. 6 (1951 U.S. ranking)

Grand Slam singles results
- Wimbledon: 1R (1949)
- US Open: QF (1948, 1950)

Doubles

Grand Slam doubles results
- Wimbledon: 3R (1949)

Mixed doubles

Grand Slam mixed doubles results
- Wimbledon: 4R (1949)

Earl Harry Cochell (May 18, 1922 – May 18, 2019) was an American tennis player, the only one barred for life by the United States Tennis Association.

== Career ==
In January 1944 he won the La Jolla Beach Invitational tournament against Knemeyer in straight sets. Cochell was ranked as high as No. 6 in the U.S. rankings before the 1951 U.S. National Championships (later the U.S. Open). In the fourth round match in that event against Gardnar Mulloy, Cochell, well known for a fiery temper and an intractably independent streak, became angry over a line call and tried to address the crowd by climbing up the chair umpire's ladder to take the microphone. Cochell was stopped from doing so and eventually lost the match to Mulloy, but afterwards, in a locker-room confrontation over the incident with tournament Referee S. Ellsworth Davenport, Cochell insulted Davenport with such abusive obscenity that, two days later, the U.S. Lawn Tennis Association (now the United States Tennis Association) banned him for life from the game and immediately dropped him from the rankings. The ban was lifted in 1962, but by then Cochell was no longer a serious competitor, and he never played another important tennis match, making only a couple of court appearances in 1962.

Cochell played his collegiate tennis at the University of Southern California, and was runner-up (to Tony Trabert of the University of Cincinnati) in the NCAA singles championship in 1951. In 1946, he reached the singles quarterfinals at the Tri-State Tennis Championships at Cincinnati (now the Cincinnati Masters). In 1949 he won the Swiss International Championships against Jaroslav Drobný at Gstaad (today's the Swiss Open).

== Personal life and death ==
Cochell married Shirley Catheryn Holmes in 1952. The couple had no children. Shirley Cochell died in Omaha, Nebraska on December 13, 2003, and was buried in Fort Madison, Iowa.

Cochell died on May 18, 2019, his 97th birthday.
