= Frank Parker (tennis) =

American tennis player

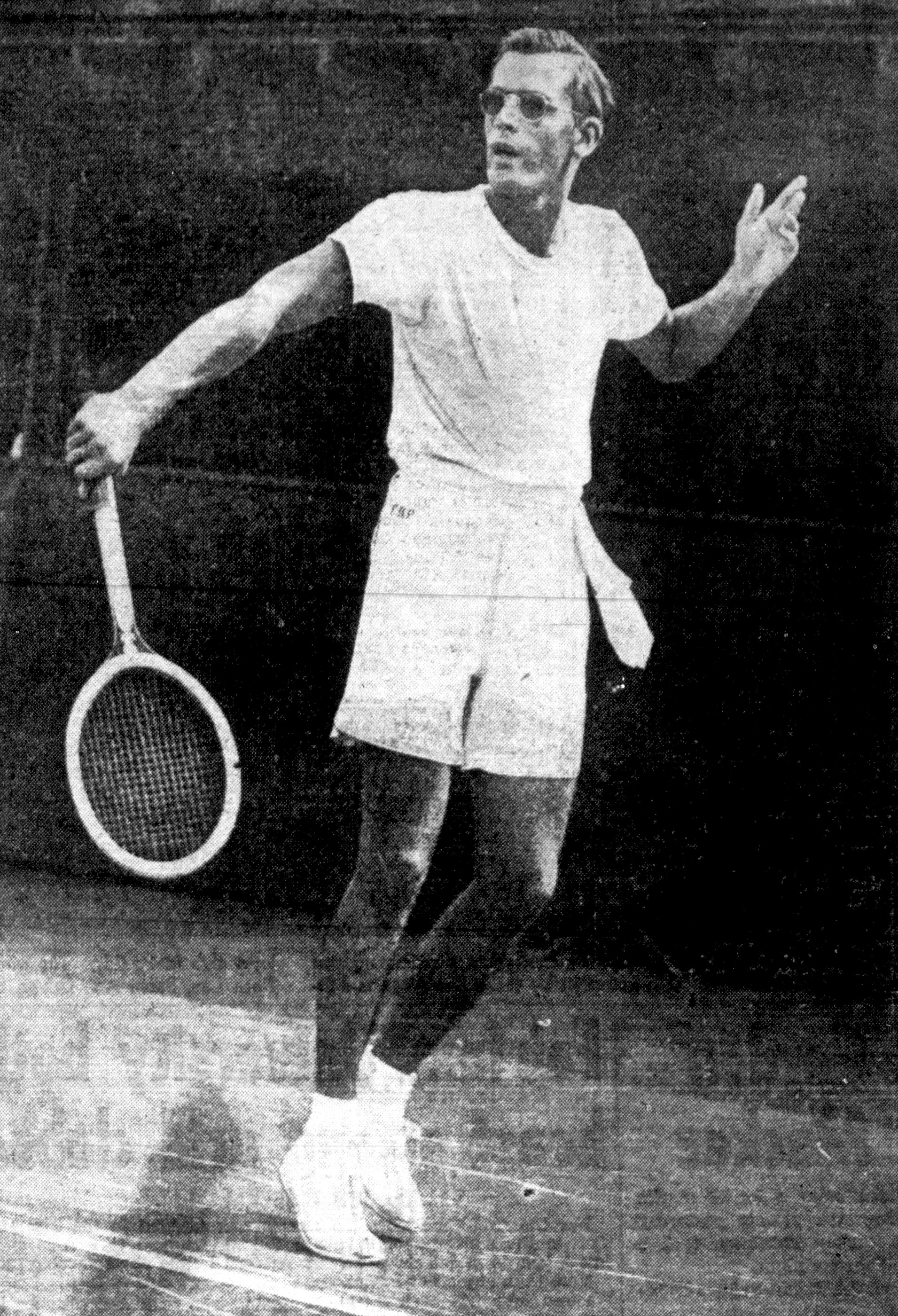
- Parker, circa 1944
- Full name: Frank Andrew Parker
- Country (sports): United States
- Born: January 31, 1916 Milwaukee, Wisconsin, U.S.
- Died: July 24, 1997 (aged 81) San Diego, California, U.S.
- Turned pro: October 1949 (amateur from 1930)
- Retired: 1971
- Plays: Right-handed (one-handed backhand)
- Int. Tennis HoF: 1966 (member page)

Singles
- Career record: 770–231 (76.9%)
- Career titles: 74
- Highest ranking: No. 1 (1948, John Olliff)

Grand Slam singles results
- French Open: W (1948, 1949)
- Wimbledon: SF (1937)
- US Open: W (1944, 1945)
- Professional majors
- US Pro: QF (1950, 1955, 1956, 1957, 1958, 1959, 1960)

Doubles

Grand Slam doubles results
- French Open: W (1949)
- Wimbledon: W (1949)
- US Open: W (1943)

Team competitions
- Davis Cup: W (1937, 1948)

Frank Andrew Parker (born Franciszek Andrzej Pajkowski, January 31, 1916 – July 24, 1997) was an amateur & later professional American male tennis player of Polish immigrant parents who was active in the 1930s and 1940s. He won four Grand Slam singles titles as well as three doubles titles.

== Early life ==
Parker was born on January 31, 1916, in Milwaukee as Franciszek Andrzej Pajkowski and had three brothers and a sister. Franciszek changed his name to Frank Parker when the sports announcers couldn't pronounce his Polish name. He learnt to play tennis at age 10, hitting discarded tennis balls at the Milwaukee Town Club. There he was discovered by the club coach Mercer Beasley who noticed his quickness and accuracy. Aged 12, he won his first national title, the boys' indoor championship played at the Seventh Regiment Armory in New York. At age 15, Paikowski become the national boys' champion in singles, defeating Gene Mako in the final, and a year later, at age 16, he won the national junior singles title as well as the men's singles title at the Canadian National Championships. In 1933, when he was 17, he won the singles title at the U.S. Men's Clay Court Championships, defeating Gene Mako in the final in straight sets. Following success in these championships, Frank earned the nickname "Boy Wonder of Tennis."

== Career ==
Parker is one of the few Americans to win both the French Championships (1948, 1949) and the U.S. Championships (1944, 1945). (Note: Other American players who have won singles titles at both the French and US Championshipba are Don Budge (1937), Don McNeill (1939–1940), Tony Trabert (1953–1954) and Andre Agassi (1994, 1999).)

Parker was 26-5 in six appearances at the Cincinnati Open, reaching four men's singles finals (1932, 1933, 1938 & 1939) before winning the singles title in 1941. Each of his four losses in a singles final in Cincinnati came against a fellow future International Tennis Hall of Famer: George Lott in 1932, Bryan Grant in 1933 and 1939, and Bobby Riggs in 1938.

Writing about Parker in his 1949 autobiography, Bobby Riggs, who had played Parker many times, stated "Parker is a tough man to get past. Equipped with a wonderful all-court game, he plays intently and with classic form. His footwork is marvelous. You never see Frankie hitting the ball from an awkward position."

In his autobiography, Jack Kramer wrote "even as a boy (Parker) had this wonderful, slightly overspin forehand drive. Clean and hard. Then for some reason, Frankie's coach, Mercer Beasley, decided to change this stroke into a chop. It was obscene." It impaired his game, particularly in preventing him from getting to the net, and Parker dropped in the rankings. A few years later, he worked hard to regain his original forehand, and according to Kramer, greatly improved his stroke, but it never was as good as it had once been. Parker was known for having a "deadpan" persona on court.

Parker took part in the 1968 US Open at the age of 52, becoming the oldest player to compete in the US Open men's singles. He also had the longest span in Grand Slam men's singles history (36 years from his first appearance at the U.S. Championships in 1932 to his last appearance in 1968).

He won the Canadian title in 1932 and again in 1938. He won five U.S. Men's Clay Court Championships and four Eastern Clay Court Championships. He was ranked World No. 1 amateur in 1948 by John Olliff of The Daily Telegraph.

Between 1937 and 1948, Parker took part in seven Davis Cup ties with the U.S. team and won the Davis Cup in 1937 and 1948. He compiled a Davis Cup record of 12 wins and two losses.

In October 1949, Parker signed a one-year contract with Bobby Riggs to become a professional tennis player.

Parker was elected to the Wisconsin Athletic Hall of Fame in 1960.

Parker was inducted into the International Tennis Hall of Fame in Newport, Rhode Island in 1966 and into the National Polish American Sports Hall of Fame in 1988.

== Personal life ==
On March 17, 1938, Parker married Audrey Beasley who previously divorced Parker's coach Mercer Beasley. She became his adviser and tailored his tennis wardrobe. His wife died in 1971, and in 1979, Parker retired from his position of salesman for a corrugated box company.

== Grand Slam finals ==
=== Singles (4 titles, 2 runner-ups) ===
Result	Year	Championship	Surface	Opponent	Score
Loss	1942	U.S. Championships	Grass	(United States) Ted Schroeder	6–8, 5–7, 6–3, 6–4, 2–6
Win	1944	U.S. Championships	Grass	(United States) William Talbert	6–4, 3–6, 6–3, 6–3
Win	1945	U.S. Championships	Grass	(United States) William Talbert	14–12, 6–1, 6–2
Loss	1947	U.S. Championships	Grass	(United States) Jack Kramer	6–4, 6–2, 1–6, 0–6, 3–6
Win	1948	French Championships	Clay	(Czechoslovakia) Jaroslav Drobný	6–4, 7–5, 5–7, 8–6
Win	1949	French Championships	Clay	(United States) Budge Patty	6–3, 1–6, 6–1, 6–4

=== Doubles (3 titles, 2 runner-ups) ===
Result	Year	Championship	Surface	Partner	Opponents	Score
Loss	1933	U.S. Championships	Grass	(United States) Frank Shields	(United States) George Lott (United States) Lester Stoefen	13–11, 7–9, 7–9, 3–6
Win	1943	U.S. Championships	Grass	(United States) Jack Kramer	(United States) Bill Talbert (United States) David Freeman	7–5, 8–6, 3–6, 6–1
Loss	1948	U.S. Championships	Grass	(United States) Ted Schroeder	(United States) Gardnar Mulloy (United States) Bill Talbert	6–1, 7–9, 3–6, 6–3, 7–9
Win	1949	French Championships	Clay	(United States) Pancho Gonzales	(South Africa) Eustace Fannin (South Africa) Eric Sturgess	6–3, 8–6, 5–7, 6–3
Win	1949	Wimbledon	Grass	(United States) Pancho Gonzales	(United States) Gardnar Mulloy (United States) Ted Schroeder	6–4, 6–4, 6–2

== Performance timeline ==
Parker joined the professional tennis circuit in 1949 and as a consequence was banned from competing in the amateur Grand Slams until the start of the Open Era.

Key
W	F	SF	QF	#R	RR	Q#	DNQ	A	NH

(W) winner; (F) finalist; (SF) semifinalist; (QF) quarterfinalist; (#R) rounds 4, 3, 2, 1; (RR) round-robin stage; (Q#) qualification round; (DNQ) did not qualify; (A) absent; (NH) not held; (SR) strike rate (events won / competed); (W–L) win–loss record.

(A*) 1-set matches in preliminary rounds.

	1932	1933	1934	1935	1936	1937	1938	1939	1940	1941	1942	1943	1944	1945	1946	1947	1948	1949	1950	1951		1952	1953	1954		1955	1956	1957	1958	1959	1960	1961	1962–1967	1968	SR	W–L	Win %
Grand Slam tournaments																																			4 / 24	86–20	81.1
Australian Open	A	A	A	A	A	A	A	A	A	Not held					A	A	A	A	Not eligible																0 / 0	0–0	–
French Open	A	A	A	A	A	A	A	A	Not held						A	A	W	W	Not eligible															A	2 / 2	12–0	100
Wimbledon	A	A	A	A	A	SF	A	A	Not held						A	A	4R	QF	Not eligible															A	0 / 3	12–3	80.0
US Open	3R	3R	QF	4R	SF	SF	4R	4R	QF	QF	F	QF	W	W	QF	F	QF	SF	Not eligible															2R	2 / 19	62–17	78.5
Pro Slam tournaments																																			0 / 9	3–13	18.8
U.S. Pro	A	A	A	A	A	A	A	A	A	A	A	A	NH	A	A	A	A	A	QF	QF	5th	A	A	A	A	QF	QF	QF	QF	QF	QF	A*	A	NH	0 / 9	3–13	18.8
French Pro	A	NH	A	A	A	A	A	A	Not held																		A	NH	A	A	A	A	A	NH	0 / 0	0–0	–
Wembley Pro	NH	NH	A	A	NH	A	NH	A	Not held									A	A	A		A	A	NH		NH	A	A	A	A	A	A	A	NH	0 / 0	0–0	–
Win–loss	2–1	2–1	2–1	2–1	4–1	10–2	2–1	3–1	3–1	3–1	5–1	2–1	5–0	5–0	4–1	6–1	12–2	14–2	1–1	1–6						1–1	0–1	0–1	0–1	0–1	0–1			0–1	4 / 33	89–33	73.0
