= Arnold Saul =

American tennis player (1924–2012)

- Born: May 30, 1924
- Died: April 6, 2012 (aged 87)
- Education: University of Southern California

Arnold Saul (May 30, 1924 – April 6, 2012) was an amateur American tennis player in the 1940s and 1950s and tennis coach.

Saul played his collegiate tennis at the University of Southern California. In 1948, he teamed with Robert Perez to reach the doubles final of the NCAA Championships before falling to Fred Kovaleski and Bernard Bartzen of William & Mary College.

At the 1949 Cincinnati Masters, Saul was seeded No. 3 and reached the singles final before losing to James Brink of Seattle in four sets (4–6, 8–6, 4–6, 0–6). He also reached the doubles final in Cincinnati that year, with partner Gil Shea. Saul and Shea lost in that final to eventual International Tennis Hall of Famer Tony Trabert and Andy Paton.
