= Herbert Behrens (tennis) =

American tennis player

- Full name: Herbert E. Behrens
- Country (sports): USA
- Born: 1 March 1929; Fort Lauderdale, Florida, United States
- Died: 30 June 2015 (aged 86); Bonita Springs, Florida, United States
- Retired: 1954

Singles
- Career titles: 2

Grand Slam singles results
- US Open: 3R (1945, 1947)

Herbert Behrens (1929 – 2015) was an American tennis player in the late 1940s.

== Career ==
Behrens began playing tennis at an early age with a racket borrowed from his sister. He was the top ranked US junior in 1947. As a 16 year old in 1945, he became the youngest ever winner of the Wisconsin state title, beating Francisco Arcocha in the final. He made his debut in the US championships in 1945 and beat the seventh foreign seeded player Brendan Macken before losing to second US seed Bill Talbert in the third round. He also reached the third round in 1947, where he lost to Jaroslav Drobný. Behrens won the 1948 Cincinnati tournament, beating Pancho Gonzales in the semi finals in five sets. Gonzales had won several tournaments in succession, but Behrens "became a veritable stonewall in the crucial fifth set. He sent everything back that his top-seeded opponent tried." Behrens won a four-hour five set final against Irvin Dorfman to be crowned champion. He played rarely on the amateur circuit after 1950. After graduating from Rollins College, Behrens worked for FP&L and then the National Title Insurance Company in Miami as a mortgage banker, becoming vice president. He was married and had three daughters.
