= La Jolla Beach Invitational =

Defunct tennis tournament
- Tour: ILTF World Circuit
- Founded: 1942; 83 years ago
- Abolished: 1959; 66 years ago
- Editions: 17
- Location: La Jolla, California, United States
- Venue: La Jolla Beach and Tennis Club
- Surface: Hard

The La Jolla Beach Invitational was a combined USTA affiliated hard court tennis tournament founded in 1942. It was played at the La Jolla Beach and Tennis Club, a private members beach resort and tennis facility in La Jolla, California, United States until 1959. The tournament was part of the main ILTF World Circuit. The tournament was usually held in the first quarter of the year January to March annually.
