= Art Larsen =

American tennis player (1925–2012)

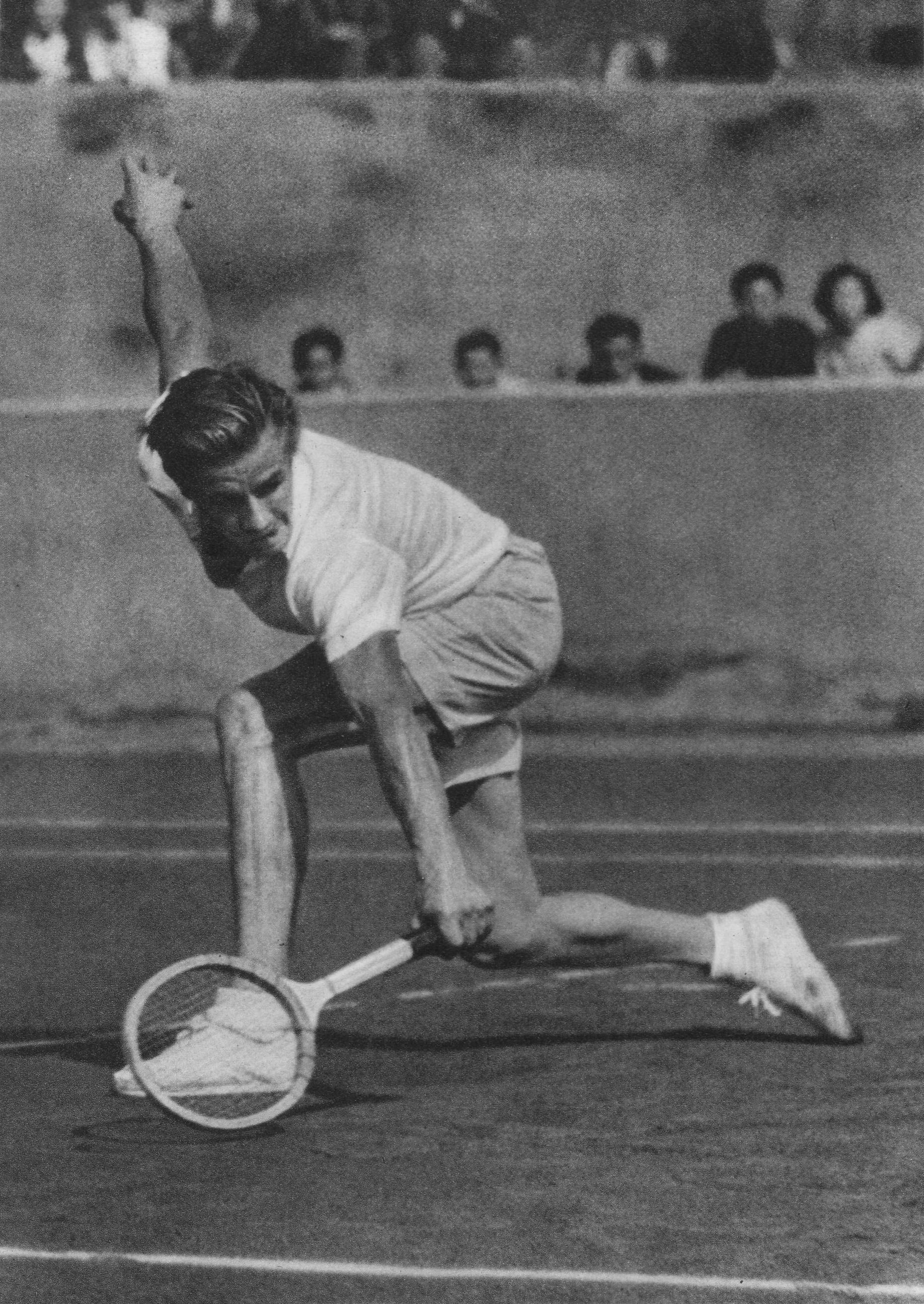
- Larsen in 1951
- Full name: Arthur David Larsen
- Country (sports): United States
- Born: April 17, 1925 Hayward, California, United States
- Died: December 7, 2012 (aged 87) San Leandro, California, United States
- Turned pro: 1948 (amateur tour)
- Retired: 1956
- Plays: Left-handed (1-handed backhand)
- Int. Tennis HoF: 1969 (member page)

Singles
- Career record: 497-156
- Career titles: 47
- Highest ranking: No. 3 (1950, John Olliff)

Grand Slam singles results
- Australian Open: SF (1951)
- French Open: F (1954)
- Wimbledon: QF (1950, 1951, 1953)
- US Open: W (1950)
Medal record
Pan American Games
Gold medal – first place	1955 Mexico City	Men's Singles

Arthur David "Art" or "Tappy" Larsen (April 17, 1925 – December 7, 2012) was a U.S. tennis player in the 1940s and 1950s.

He was the world No. 3 tennis player in the rankings by John Olliff and Pierre Gillou for 1950 and the U.S. No. 1 male tennis player in the USLTA rankings for 1950. He won the "Times" national sports award for the outstanding tennis player of 1950.

Larsen was ranked among the world top ten male tennis players in expert rankings for 1949, 1950, 1951, 1952, 1953, and 1954.

Larsen was the first player to win all of the USLTA (USTA) national tennis titles, the U.S. Open (grass), the U.S. Clay Court (clay), the U.S. Hardcourt (cement), and the U.S. National Indoor (indoor). Larsen was inducted into the International Tennis Hall of Fame in 1969.

He is most remembered for his victory at the U.S. Championships in 1950 and for his personal eccentricities.

== Tennis career ==
Larsen pushed Pancho Gonzales to five-set matches at the U.S. Championships in both 1948 and 1949, Gonzales winning both U.S. Championships. Larsen won the Queen's Club tournament in 1950 defeating Frank Sedgman and John Bromwich in the last two rounds, but lost a tight five-set quarterfinal at Wimbledon that year to Sedgman.

Larsen won the 1950 U.S. Open Tennis Championships, defeating John Horn, Sven Davidson, Jaroslav Drobný, Tom Brown, Dick Savitt in the semifinal, and Herb Flam in the final.

Larsen was ranked as world No. 3 in 1950 by John Olliff of The Daily Telegraph, and by Pierre Gillou in L'Équipe. Larsen was ranked as the U.S. No. 1 tennis player for 1950 by the USLTA. He won the "Times" national sports award for the outstanding tennis player of 1950.

Larsen was ranked among the world top ten male tennis players in expert rankings for 1949, 1950, 1951, 1952, 1953, and 1954.

In 1951, Larsen defended his U.S. Championship, reaching the semifinal where he lost to Sedgman, the champion for that year.

In 1954, Larsen defeated Drobny and Seixas at the French Open, but lost the final to Trabert.

Although he was ranked by the USLTA as the No. 1 U.S. tennis player for 1950 and the U.S. No. 3 in 1952, 1953, and 1955, Larsen was never selected to represent the United States in Davis Cup Challenge Round competition because he supposedly "never met the selection requirements as mandated by the USLTA." Players who were ranked well below Larsen by the USLTA were chosen instead.

In 1950, Budge Patty was the Wimbledon champion and was ranked world No. 1 by John Olliff, and Larsen ranked world No. 3 by the same source. However neither player would represent the U.S. in the Davis Cup Challenge Round, with Tom Brown and Ted Schroeder being chosen instead. The results of that 1950 Challenge Round were disappointing for the U.S. team. In November 1950, Larsen won the New South Wales Championships at White City in Sydney, defeating the two Australian singles representatives in the Davis Cup Challenge Round, Frank Sedgman and Ken McGregor, in the final two rounds.

Larsen was the first man to win all of the recognized USLTA (USTA) national titles, the U.S. Open Tennis Championships (grass), the U.S. Clay Court Championships (clay) in 1952 over Savitt in the final, the U.S. Hardcourt Championships (cement) in 1950 and 1952 over Flam in both finals, and the U.S. National Indoor Championships in 1953 over Kurt Nielsen in the final. Since then, only Tony Trabert has equaled his feat.

== Personal life ==
A member of the Olympic Club in San Francisco, he previously attended the University of San Francisco, where he was a member of the 1949 NCAA Men's Tennis Championship team. He was 5 feet 10 inches and 150 pounds and was known for his partying before and during his tournament appearances. It frequently was written that Larsen would arrive for an important match directly from an all-night party with no benefit of sleep.

Larsen's tennis career ended abruptly in November 1956 after a motor scooter accident in Castro Valley, California. He partially was paralyzed and lost sight in one eye. He was the no. 8 ranked American amateur at the end of that year.

Larsen was inducted into the International Tennis Hall of Fame in 1969.

Larsen died on December 7, 2012, at the age of 87.

Jack Kramer, tennis player and long-time promoter, stated in his 1979 autobiography that "Larsen was fascinating to watch. He had concentrated on tennis as mental therapy after serving long stretches in the front lines during (World War II). He was called Tappy because he went around touching everything for good luck, and sometimes he would chat with an imaginary bird that sat on his shoulder. This was good theatre, but it could never have made Larsen a candidate for a professional tour."

== Grand Slam finals ==
=== Singles (1 title, 1 runner-up) ===
Result	Year	Championship	Surface	Opponent	Score
Win	1950	U.S. National Championships	Grass	(United States) Herbie Flam	6–3, 4–6, 5–7, 6–4, 6–3
Loss	1954	French Championships	Clay	(United States) Tony Trabert	4–6, 5–7, 1–6

== Grand Slam tournament performance timeline ==
Key
W	F	SF	QF	#R	RR	Q#	DNQ	A	NH

(W) winner; (F) finalist; (SF) semifinalist; (QF) quarterfinalist; (#R) rounds 4, 3, 2, 1; (RR) round-robin stage; (Q#) qualification round; (DNQ) did not qualify; (A) absent; (NH) not held; (SR) strike rate (events won / competed); (W–L) win–loss record.

=== Singles ===
Tournament	1948	1949	1950	1951	1952	1953	1954	1955	1956	SR
Australian Championships	A	A	A	SF	A	A	A	A	A	0 / 1
French Championships	A	A	QF	A	A	A	F	4R	4R	0 / 4
Wimbledon	A	A	QF	QF	1R	QF	3R	4R	4R	0 / 7
U.S. National Championships	4R	QF	W	SF	4R	4R	QF	4R	3R	1 / 9
Strike rate	0 / 1	0 / 1	1 / 3	0 / 3	0 / 2	0 / 2	0 / 3	0 / 3	0 / 3	1 / 21

== Sources ==
- The Game, My 40 Years in Tennis (1979), Jack Kramer with Frank Deford (ISBN 0-399-12336-9)
