= Harry Likas =

American tennis player

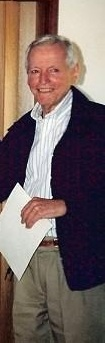
- Full name: Henry Edward Likas Jr.
- Country (sports): United States
- Born: February 27, 1924 San Francisco, California
- Died: March 2, 2017 (aged 93)
- College: University of San Francisco

Grand Slam singles results
- Wimbledon: 3R (1952)
- US Open: QF (1948)

Grand Slam doubles results
- Wimbledon: 1R (1952)

Henry "Harry" Edward Likas Jr. of San Francisco, and later Belvedere-Tiburon, California, was an Intercollegiate Tennis Association Hall of Fame inductee most notable for winning the 1948 National Collegiate Athletic Association Tennis Singles Championship.

== Early life ==
Harry Likas was born in San Francisco, California, on February 27, 1924. He started playing Northern California and National Junior tournaments. Likas was rated the number one youth in the nation and won the Boy’s California Championship. At 18, Likas was selected to be on the National Junior Davis Cup team.

After graduating from Lowell High School in San Francisco, Likas went on to play tennis for the University of San Francisco where he eventually won the 1948 NCAA singles championship beating Vic Seix. He beat five future Wimbledon champions: Jaroslav Drobný, Bob Falkenburg, Budge Patty, Dick Savitt. He also defeated world Champion Pancho Gonzales.

== Later life ==
Likas would serve on the board of the United States Tennis Association (USTA Nor Cal division), then known as the Northern California Tennis Association, NCTA). In his role as a board member, he transitioned the old Pacific Coast Championships, a tournament he had won as a junior, into a money tournament - the Fireman's Fund Open International. The tournament was played at the Round Hill Country Club in Alamo, California and, due to Likas' role, was televised nationally on PBS. He married Ann Katharine Jessup in 1950, and had four children and was active in the securities business and coached professional tennis players.
