= Nick Carter (tennis) =

American tennis player

Clarence "Nick" Carter (June 6, 1918 – October 25, 1989) of San Francisco, California, was a top-level amateur tennis player in the 1940s and 1950s. He was ranked as high as No. 17 in the U.S.

In 1948, Carter was the runner-up at the U.S. Clay Court Championships (falling to Richard "Pancho" Gonzalez in the final) and reached the round of 16 at the U.S. National Championships.

Carter won the singles championship at the Cincinnati Open in 1946, defeating Filipino Davis Cupper Felicisimo Ampon in the Round of 16, Earl Cochell in the quarterfinals, George Ball of El Paso, Texas, in the semifinals and George Richards, of San Diego, California, in the final. He also won the doubles title in Cincinnati that year with Norman Brooks of San Francisco, California.

Carter also won the Northern California tennis title three times and the Oregon state title in 1942 & 1953.

He was enshrined into the USTA/Northern California Section Hall of Fame in 1993.

Carter's daughter, Denise Carter-Triolo, also played on the tennis circuit. His other daughters, Cathy and Kris, were ranked in tennis in California. A student of Carter, Jeff Brown was a national junior doubles champion, and he ranked No. 1 in California. Additionally, he coached Rosie Casals, who became a touring professional and won Grand Slam doubles titles with Billie Jean King. He also coached many state and nationally ranked junior players while as a teaching professional at Arden Hills Swimming and Tennis Club, where Mark Spitz trained, in Carmichael, California.
