= George E. Richards =

American tennis player

- Full name: George Edward Richards
- Country (sports): United States
- Residence: Rossmoor, California
- Born: April 23, 1921 Montebello, California
- Died: March 12, 1992 (aged 70) Rossmoor, California
- Height: 6 ft (183 cm)
- Turned pro: 1940 (amateur tour)
- Retired: 1950
- Plays: Left handed with one handed backhand
- College: none
- Prize money: 0

Singles
- Highest ranking: No. 8 (1942 U.S. ranking)

Grand Slam singles results
- US Open: QF (1942)

George Edward Richards (April 23, 1921 – March 12, 1992) was an American tennis tournament player from 1940 until 1950. He was born in Montebello, California. At Montebello High School he played #1 Singles as a sophomore ahead of Jack Kramer. They both took lessons from Dick Skeen, renowned Tennis Coach, according to Jack Kramer's father, David. He died in Rossmoor, California in 1992, aged 71 years old.

== Tennis career ==
He was ranked as high as No. 8 in the United States during his career, achieving that ranking in 1942.

In singles, he was a finalist at Cincinnati in 1946 (falling to fellow Californian Nick Carter), a semifinalist at the 1942 U.S. Clay Court Championship, and a quarterfinalist at the 1942 U.S. National Championships against Gardnar Mulloy.

In doubles, he won the 1950 title in Cincinnati with Ham Richardson and the 1942 Eastern Clay Court Championship with Charles Mattmann. Also, he was a finalist at the 1942 U.S. Clay Court Championships with Mattmann and the 1942 Pacific Southwest Championship with Frank Parker. He also paired with Parker to reach the semifinals at the 1942 U.S. Nationals.

== Later career ==
After WWII, George became a pilot for United Airlines and continued to play tennis at Lakewood Country Club and in some tournaments. He played often with Ken Stuart and formed a partnership with him to recondition old classic cars. He retired from United Airlines in 1986. He was a major investor in IBM stock, and left his family in good financial condition. Jack Kramer and his father, David, who admired George greatly, and car partner, Ken, attended his funeral at Rose Hills Cemetery, Whittier, CA. in 1992.
