= Seymour Greenberg =

American tennis player

- Country (sports): United States
- Born: August 10, 1920 Chicago, Illinois
- Died: March 3, 2006 (aged 85) Park Ridge, Illinois

Singles
- Career record: 177-93
- Career titles: 22
- Highest ranking: No. 5 (1943, 1944 U.S. ranking)

Grand Slam singles results
- US Open: QF (1942, 1943, 1944, 1945)

Seymour Greenberg (August 10, 1920 in Chicago, Illinois – March 3, 2006 in Park Ridge, Illinois) was an amateur American clay-court specialist tennis player in the 1940s and 1950s. Greenberg won the U.S. Men's Clay Court Championships in 1942 and 1943.

Greenberg was ranked U.S. No. 5 in singles in 1943 and 1944, and also in 1942, 1945, and 1947.

== Early life ==
Greenberg was born in Chicago, Illinois to Jacob and Sylvia Greenberg, lived in Highland Park, Illinois, and was Jewish.

== Tennis career ==
He won the Western Boys’ 15 and Under Championship, and was runner-up in the National 15s.

Greenberg won the National Public Parks Championship. He also won the Illinois State high school singles titles in 1936 and 1937 while at Lane Technical College Prep High School in Chicago, where he was valedictorian. Greenberg won the City of Chicago Championship in 1939.

Greenberg won the Illinois State Championships nine times.

Attending the school on scholarship, Greenberg was captain of the Northwestern University tennis team and became that school's first Big Ten Conference singles champion when he won the title in 1940. He repeated in 1941 and won the Big Ten doubles championships in 1940 (with Jerry Clifford), 1941 (with Gene Richards), and 1942 (also with Richards). Greenberg's three doubles titles still rank first all-time in Big Ten history. He led the Northwestern Wildcats to the Big Ten team championships in 1940 and 1942. He was a member of the Phi Epsilon Pi fraternity.

Greenberg won the U.S. Men's Clay Court Championships in 1942 and 1943. Greenberg was also a singles quarterfinalist at the U.S. Championships in 1942, 1943, 1944, and 1945. He won the men's singles in the Ojai Tennis Tournament in 1947.

In 1943 at the Cincinnati Open, Greenberg reached the singles and doubles finals but lost the singles final to future International Tennis Hall of Fame inductee Bill Talbert. He and his partner Joe Scherr lost the doubles final to Talbert and partner Alvin Bunis.

During World War II he was a Lieutenant in the US Air Force.

== Halls of Fame ==
Greenberg has been inducted into:

- the Chicago Jewish Sports Hall of Fame (1982),
- the United States Tennis Association/Midwest (formerly Western Tennis Association) Hall of Fame (in 1990),
- the Northwestern University Athletic Hall of Fame (2000), and
- the Chicago Tennis Hall of Fame (2004)

== Personal life ==
Greenberg married the late Wanda Henderson in 1952. Greenberg's sister Toby played in the Maccabiah Games in Israel. Greenberg's death resulted from complications of Parkinson's disease in Park Ridge Illinois .

== See also ==
- List of select Jewish tennis players
