= Sam Match =

American tennis player

- Full name: Samuel Match
- Country (sports): United States
- Born: January 3, 1923; Los Angeles, United States
- Died: January 23, 2010 (aged 87); Redondo Beach, California, United States
- Turned pro: 1954 (amateur tour from 1940)
- Retired: 1968

Singles
- Highest ranking: No. 8 (1949)

Grand Slam singles results
- US Open: 3R (1946, 1947, 1949)
- Professional majors
- US Pro: QF (1954)

Doubles
- Highest ranking: No. 4 (1948)
- Last updated on: October 1, 2012.

Samuel Match (January 3, 1923 – January 23, 2010) was an American tennis player. He was born in Los Angeles, California.

Match was ranked among the top ten amateur players in the United States in 1948, 1949, and 1950 in both singles and doubles play. Lawn Tennis and Badminton magazine ranked him as the 12th-best professional player for the year 1955.

== Early life ==
Match was born in Los Angeles, California, and was Jewish. He attended Los Angeles High School.

== Career ==
He was the California state junior champion at age 18.

He was a radio operator for three years in the United States Army Air Corps while in Guam, and played and lost to Bobby Riggs in the finals of the Army-Navy Championships in 1945.

In 1947, playing doubles for Rice University, Match along with his doubles partner Bob Curtis beat Herbert Flam and Gene Garrett of UCLA 6–4, 8–10, 3–6, 6–2, 7–5 to win the NCAA doubles title.

Match twice defeated US No. 1, Pancho Gonzales. The first time was 1948 at Newport, Rhode Island, and the second time was in 1949 at River Oaks in Houston. He was a terrific player with classic groundstrokes.

As an amateur, Match won at La Jolla, California, on February 16, 1948; at Philadelphia in 1948; and at the Utah State Open in 1948 and 1949.

In 1949, playing for the University of San Francisco, Jack Tuero of Tulane beat Match in five sets in the finals of the NCAA tournament. Match and Art Larsen lost the doubles championship in the finals.

Match was the runner-up in La Jolla (March 19, 1950), the California State in San Francisco (May 21, 1950), the Colorado State in Denver (June 9, 1950), and in Salt Lake City (July 2, 1950).

Match's first appearance in a professional tournament was at the California State Pro in Beverly Hills, California (August 11–16, 1953).

== Accolades ==
Match was inducted into the University of San Francisco Athletic Hall of Fame.

In 1991, Match was inducted into the Rice Athletic Hall of Fame.

Match was inducted in 2000 into the Southern California Jewish Sports Hall of Fame.

In 2005, he was honored as one of the University of San Francisco's 75 greatest athletic legends.

== See also ==
- List of select Jewish tennis players
