= Tony Trabert =

American tennis player (1930–2021)

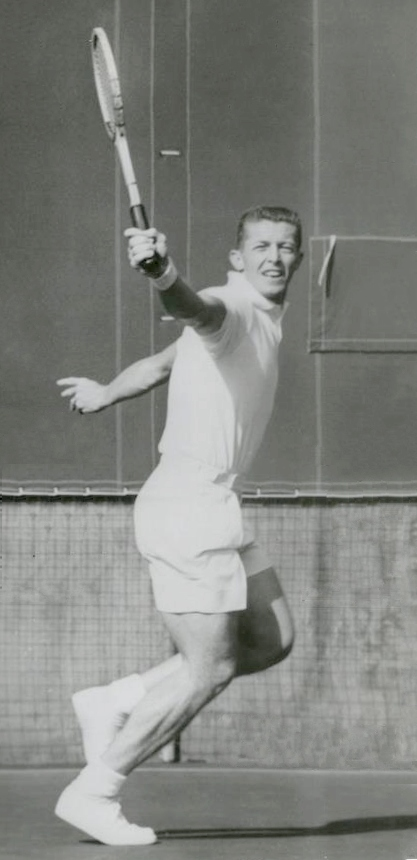
- Trabert in 1960
- Full name: Marion Anthony Trabert
- Country (sports): United States
- Born: August 16, 1930 Cincinnati, Ohio, United States
- Died: February 3, 2021 (aged 90) Ponte Vedra Beach, Florida, United States
- Height: 6 ft 1 in (1.85 m)
- Turned pro: 1955 (amateur from 1945)
- Retired: 1963
- Plays: Right-handed (one-handed backhand)
- Int. Tennis HoF: 1970 (member page)

Singles
- Career record: 766–456 (62.6%)
- Career titles: 56
- Highest ranking: No. 1 (1953, Lance Tingay)

Grand Slam singles results
- Australian Open: SF (1955)
- French Open: W (1954, 1955)
- Wimbledon: W (1955)
- US Open: W (1953, 1955)

Other tournaments
- Professional majors
- US Pro: F (1960)
- Wembley Pro: F (1958)
- French Pro: W (1956, 1959)
- Other pro events
- TOC: SF (1959^{FH})

Doubles
- Career record: 2–4
- Highest ranking: No. 1 (1955)

Grand Slam doubles results
- Australian Open: W (1955)
- French Open: W (1950, 1954, 1955)
- Wimbledon: F (1954)
- US Open: W (1954)

Team competitions
- Davis Cup: W (1954)

Marion Anthony Trabert (August 16, 1930 – February 3, 2021) was an American amateur world No. 1 tennis champion and long-time tennis author, TV commentator, instructor, and motivational speaker.

Trabert was ranked world No. 1 amateur by many sources in 1953, by Ned Potter and The New York Times in 1954 and by Lance Tingay and Ned Potter in 1955. He was the winner of ten Grand Slam titles – five in singles and five in doubles. He won two French singles championships, two U.S. National Men's Singles Championships, and one Wimbledon gentlemen's singles championship. Until Michael Chang won the French Open in 1989, Trabert was the last American man to hoist the championship trophy. He turned professional in the fall of 1955. He won the French Professional Championships at Roland Garros in 1956 and 1959.

== Tennis career ==
=== Amateur ===
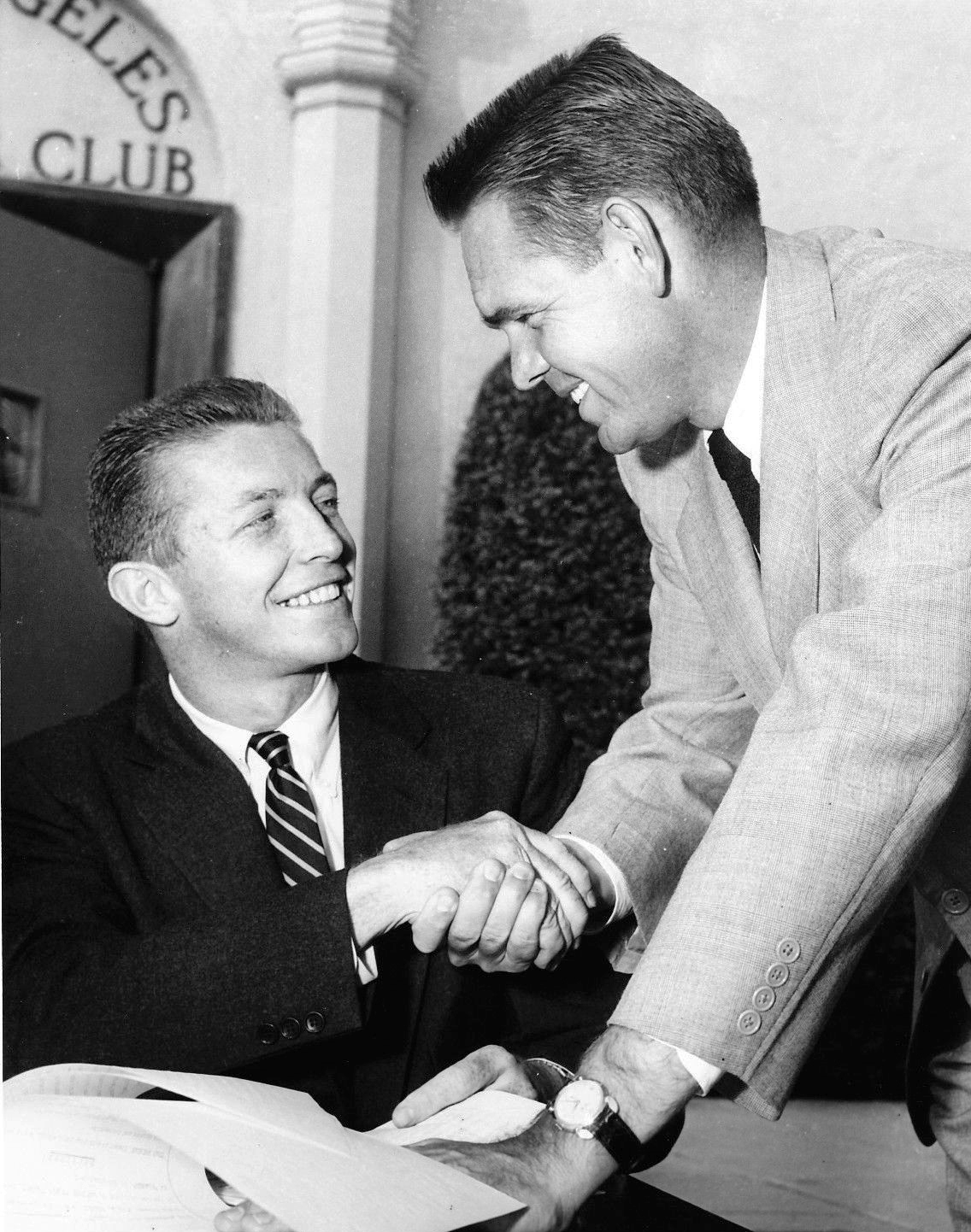
Trabert (left) with Jack Kramer in 1955

Trabert was a stand-out athlete in tennis and basketball at the University of Cincinnati, and was a member of Sigma Chi fraternity. In 1951, he won the NCAA Championship Singles title. He played doubles with Bob Mault and was coached by George Menefee, who later became the head trainer for the Los Angeles Rams. Trabert was also a starter on the Cincinnati Bearcats basketball team at the University of Cincinnati. Previously, at Walnut Hills High School in Cincinnati, he had been Ohio scholastic champion three times and played guard on the 1948 basketball team that won the District Championship.

A native of Cincinnati, Trabert grew up two houses down from a public park. It had clay courts that helped hone his groundstrokes. By age 11, Trabert was winning junior tournaments. Trabert honed his tennis skills on the courts of the Cincinnati Tennis Club with the help of another member of that club, fellow International Tennis Hall of Famer Billy Talbert. Talbert became Trabert's mentor. In 1951, Trabert posted his first win over Talbert in the final of Cincinnati's international tennis tournament (now known as the Cincinnati Masters). In the midst of his amateur career, Trabert's game was interrupted by a two-year stint in the Navy, serving on the aircraft carrier USS Coral Sea during the Korean War, but this did not stop him. In 1953, Trabert won the men's singles in the Ojai Tennis Tournament. After winning his first Grand Slam singles title at the U. S. Championships in 1953 (over Vic Seixas in the final), Trabert was ranked the world No. 1 amateur for 1953 by Lance Tingay in The Daily Telegraph, Ned Potter in World Tennis, Gardnar Mulloy, Bill Talbert, Ham Richardson, Hal Burrows and Grant Golden. In 1954 Trabert won the French Championships (over Mervyn Rose, Budge Patty in the semifinal and Arthur Larsen in the final) and was ranked world number one amateur by Ned Potter in World Tennis and by panel of 8 experts in The New York Times. (Note: Lance Tingay, London Telegraph; CM Jones, British Lawn Tennis; Réné Mathieu, Smash magazine; Philippe Chatrier, Tennis de France; Umberto Mezzanote, Tennis Italiano; Arthur Goldman, Anson Press; Allison Danzig, New York Times; Jack Russell, Tennis Australia) In 1955, Trabert won three consecutive Grand Slam singles titles: the French (over Rose in the semifinal and Sven Davidson in the final), Wimbledon (beating Kurt Nielsen in the final) and U. S. Championships (over Rosewall in the final). He was ranked world number one amateur for 1955 by Lance Tingay and by Ned Potter.

Trabert's record in 1955 was one of the greatest ever by an American tennis player. He won the three most prestigious tournaments in amateur tennis—the French, Wimbledon, and American Championships. He won Wimbledon and the US in 1955 without losing a set (the only time it has ever been done in consecutive majors). He is one of only ten male players to have won three Grand Slam singles title in a year. Trabert's own chance at a Grand Slam was stopped with a loss to Ken Rosewall in the semifinals at the Australian Championships. Trabert won 18 tournaments in 1955, compiling a match record of 106 wins to 7 losses, which included a 38-match winning streak.

Trabert, along with Vic Seixas, was an American Davis Cup team mainstay during the early 1950s, during which time the Americans reached the finals five times, winning the cup in 1954. It was one of only two victories over the dominant Australian teams during the decade (the other being in 1958). He called the 1954 Davis Cup win the "biggest thrill in my tennis career". Trabert turned pro after winning the '55 U.S. Championships because he had a wife and two children to support.

=== Professional ===
Having reached the top amateur ranking in 1955, Trabert turned professional in the fall of that year. Trabert explained: "When I won Wimbledon as an amateur, I got a 10-pound certificate, which was worth $27 redeemable at Lilly White's Sporting Goods store in London. Jack Kramer offered me a guarantee of $75,000 against a percentage of the gate to play on his tour." With a wife and two children to support, the decision was clear. In 1956, he was beaten on the head-to-head world pro tour by the reigning king of professional tennis Pancho Gonzales, 74–27, consisting mostly of indoor matches on a portable loose canvas surface. Forty years after his matches with Gonzales, Trabert told interviewer Joe McCauley "that Gonzales' serve was the telling factor on their tour—it was so good that it earned him many cheap points. Trabert felt that, while he had the better ground-strokes, he could not match Pancho's big, fluent service." However, he beat Gonzales in five sets at Roland Garros in the final of the 1956 French Pro title. Trabert also won a South American tour over Gonzales, Sedgman, and Kramer in 1956, winning six matches against Gonzales, and losing three matches indoor, for a 6–3 edge over Gonzales on that tour. For the year 1956 as a whole, Trabert had an edge over Gonzales in outdoor matches of 16–11 (1–1 on grass, 4–5 on cement, and 11–5 on clay).

In the 1958 pro tour, Trabert won a personal series against Segura 34–31, showing that he had adjusted to the portable canvas surface used by the Kramer pros in small indoor venues and gyms. In the Wembley Pro in 1958, he defeated Rosewall in the semi-final and was runner-up to Sedgman . In the French Pro at Roland Garros in 1959, Trabert beat Rosewall in the semifinal and then defeated Frank Sedgman in the final, to win his fourth title at the red clay venue. In the 1960 US Pro (billed as Cleveland World Pro), he was runner-up to Alex Olmedo. In November 1961, Trabert led the United States team into the Kramer Cup final (the pro equivalent of the Davis Cup) at Ellis Park in Johannesburg. Trabert defeated Rosewall in four sets, but lost the fifth and deciding rubber to Lew Hoad in four sets. The following week, Trabert won the Western Province Pro in Cape Town, beating Rosewall in the final. In October 1962, Trabert won the South African Pro Championships on the cement courts of Ellis Park in Johannesburg by defeating Hoad in the final in five sets. Trabert also had wins over Hoad at the Forest Hills Tournament of Champions in 1957 and 1958.

In his 1979 autobiography The Game Jack Kramer, the former world No. 1 player, included Trabert in his list of the 21 greatest players (Note: Kramer considered the best player ever to have been either Don Budge (for consistent play) or Ellsworth Vines (at the height of his game). The next four best were, chronologically, Bill Tilden, Fred Perry, Bobby Riggs, and Pancho Gonzales. After these six came the "second echelon" of Rod Laver, Lew Hoad, Ken Rosewall, Gottfried von Cramm, Ted Schroeder, Jack Crawford, Pancho Segura, Frank Sedgman, Tony Trabert, John Newcombe, Arthur Ashe, Stan Smith, Björn Borg, and Jimmy Connors.) of all time.

== Post-playing career ==
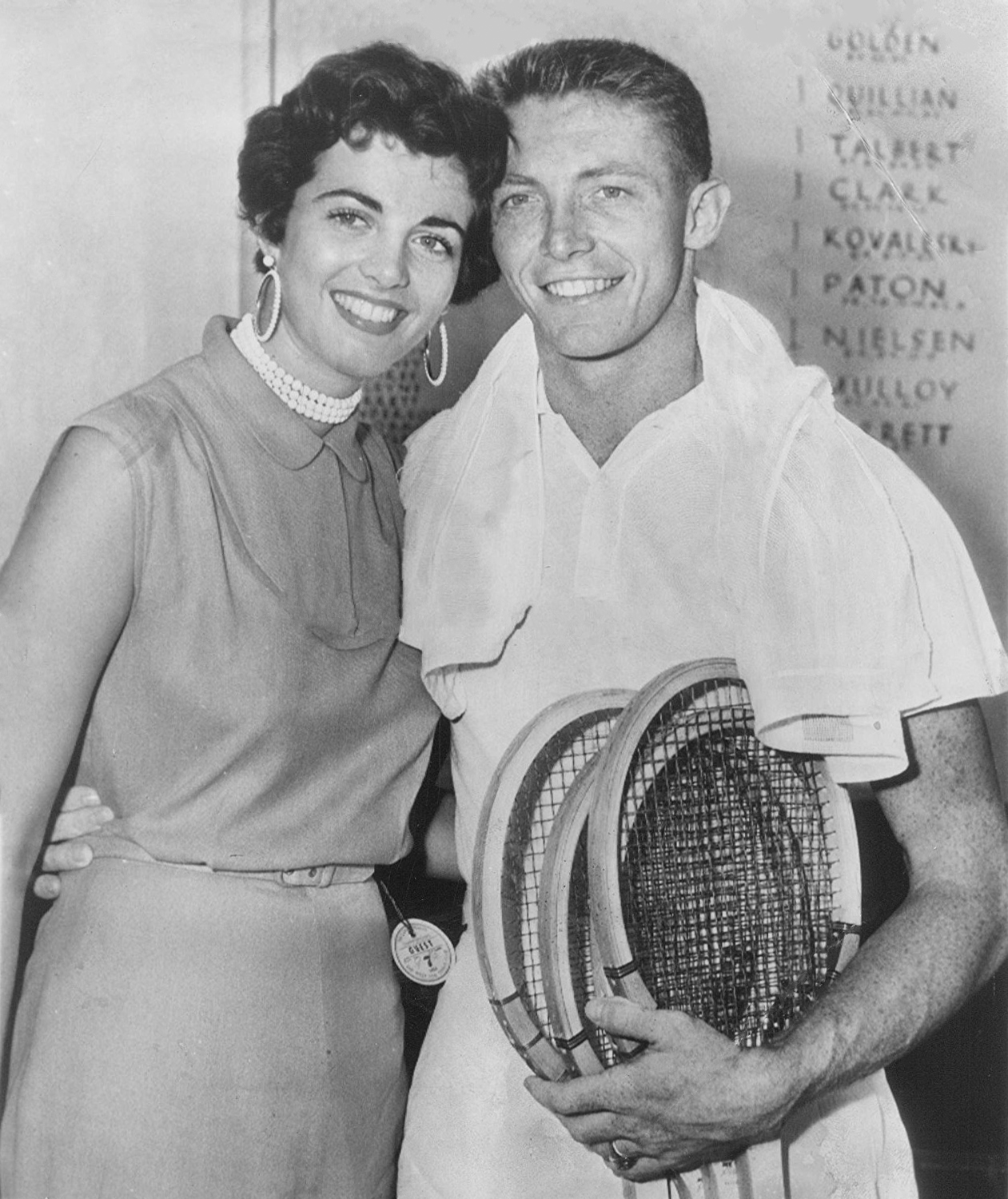
Trabert with his first wife Shauna in 1953

After retiring from the game, Trabert enjoyed a 33-year career (1971–2004) as a tennis and golf analyst for CBS, covering events such as the US Open. During many of those years, he teamed with Pat Summerall and was the lead commentator at the US Open. The popularity of their broadcasts helped propel the US Open into an annual financial success for CBS and the United States Tennis Association. He was also the US Davis Cup team captain from 1976 to 1980. Trabert's captaincy is remembered by his frustration in dealing with the egos of younger players like John McEnroe and for his racket-wielding expulsion of anti-apartheid protesters who ran onto the court during a Davis Cup match against South Africa at the Newport Beach Tennis Club in California in April 1977.

In 1980 he had a small cameo role on the television show "Hart to Hart", Season 1, episode 24. He played a tennis pro at a tennis club.

He was also a tennis author and was a motivational speaker. In 1988, he published the book Trabert on Tennis, sharing his insights on the game from a player's, coach's, and commentator's standpoint. In 1970, with the encouragement of Dr. Toby Freedman and Dale Jensen, Trabert opened the Tony Trabert Tennis Camp in Ojai, California at Thacher School, and then one in Pebble Beach, California for ages 8–18.

Trabert served as president of the International Tennis Hall of Fame in Newport, Rhode Island from 2001 to 2011.

In 2004, he announced his retirement from broadcasting while commentating at the Wimbledon Championships.

Trabert resided in Ponte Vedra Beach, Florida with Vicki Trabert, his wife of 30 years, and their grandchildren. They had five children (two of his and three of hers) and 14 grandchildren.

Trabert died at age 90 at his home in Ponte Vedra Beach, Florida, on February 3, 2021.

== Awards and honors ==
In 1970, Trabert was inducted into the International Tennis Hall of Fame in Newport, Rhode Island. He was enshrined into the Cincinnati Tennis Hall of Fame in 2002 together with Billy Talbert. On September 8, 2014, Trabert was inducted into the United States Tennis Association's Court of Champions prior to the US Open men's singles final.

== Major finals ==
=== Grand Slam tournaments ===
==== Singles: 5 (5 titles) ====
Result	Year	Championship	Surface	Opponent	Score
Win	1953	U.S. Championships	Grass	(United States) Victor Seixas	6–3, 6–2, 6–3
Win	1954	French Championships	Clay	(United States) Arthur Larsen	6–4, 7–5, 6–1
Win	1955	French Championships (2)	Clay	(Sweden) Sven Davidson	2–6, 6–1, 6–4, 6–2
Win	1955	Wimbledon	Grass	(Denmark) Kurt Nielsen	6–3, 7–5, 6–1
Win	1955	U.S. Championships (2)	Grass	(Australia) Ken Rosewall	9–7, 6–3, 6–3

==== Doubles: 6 (5 titles, 1 runner-up) ====
Result	Year	Championship	Surface	Partner	Opponents	Score
Win	1950	French Championships	Clay	(United States) Bill Talbert	(Egypt) Jaroslav Drobný (South Africa) Eric Sturgess	6–2, 1–6, 10–8, 6–2
Win	1954	French Championships	Clay	(United States) Vic Seixas	(Australia) Lew Hoad (Australia) Ken Rosewall	6–4, 6–2, 6–1
Loss	1954	Wimbledon	Grass	(United States) Vic Seixas	(Australia) Rex Hartwig (Australia) Mervyn Rose	4–6, 4–6, 6–3, 4–6
Win	1954	U.S. Championships	Grass	(United States) Vic Seixas	(Australia) Lew Hoad (Australia) Ken Rosewall	3–6, 6–4, 8–6, 6–3
Win	1955	Australian Championships	Grass	(United States) Vic Seixas	(Australia) Lew Hoad (Australia) Ken Rosewall	6–3, 6–2, 2–6, 3–6, 6–1
Win	1955	French Championships	Clay	(United States) Vic Seixas	(Italy) Nicola Pietrangeli (Italy) Orlando Sirola	6–1, 4–6, 6–2, 6–4

=== Pro Slam tournaments ===
==== Singles: 4 (2 titles, 2 runner-ups) ====
Result	Year	Championship	Surface	Opponent	Score
Win	1956	French Pro	Clay	(United States) Pancho Gonzales	6–3, 4–6, 5–7, 8–6, 6–2
Loss	1958	Wembley Pro	Indoor	(Australia) Frank Sedgman	4–6, 3–6, 4–6
Win	1959	French Pro	Clay	(Australia) Frank Sedgman	6–4, 6–4, 6–4
Loss	1960	U.S. Pro	Indoor	(Peru) Alex Olmedo	5–7, 4–6

== Singles performance timeline ==
Trabert joined the professional tennis circuit in 1955 and as a consequence was banned from competing in the amateur Grand Slams until the start of the Open Era at the 1968 French Open.

Key
W	F	SF	QF	#R	RR	Q#	DNQ	A	NH

(W) winner; (F) finalist; (SF) semifinalist; (QF) quarterfinalist; (#R) rounds 4, 3, 2, 1; (RR) round-robin stage; (Q#) qualification round; (DNQ) did not qualify; (A) absent; (NH) not held; (SR) strike rate (events won / competed); (W–L) win–loss record.

	1948	1949	1950	1951	1952	1953	1954	1955	1956	1957	1958	1959	1960	1961	1962	1963	SR	W–L	Win %
Grand Slam tournaments																	5 / 16	58–11	84.1
Australian Open	A	A	A	A	A	A	2R	SF	not eligible								0 / 2	4–2	66.7
French Open	A	A	4R	A	4R	A	W	W	not eligible								2 / 4	18–2	90.0
Wimbledon	A	A	2R	A	A	A	SF	W	not eligible								1 / 3	13–2	86.7
US Open	3R	2R	1R	QF	A	W	QF	W	not eligible								2 / 7	23–5	82.1
Pro Slam tournaments																	2 / 19	27–17	61.4
U.S. Pro	A	A	A	A	A	A	A	A	SF	SF	SF	A	F	A	A	QF	0 / 5	5–5	50.0
French Pro	not held								W	NH	QF	W	SF	SF	1R	1R	2 / 7	11–5	68.8
Wembley Pro	NH	A	A	A	A	A	NH	NH	SF	A	F	SF	QF	QF	QF	QF	0 / 7	11–7	61.1
Win–loss	2–1	1–1	3–3	4–1	3–1	6–0	16–3	23–1	6–2	1–1	4–3	6–1	5–3	3–2	1–2	1–3	7 / 35	85–28	75.2

The results of the Pro Tours are not listed here.

== General sources ==
- The Game: My 40 Years in Tennis (1979), Jack Kramer with Frank Deford (ISBN 0-399-12336-9)
- Little Pancho (2009), Caroline Seebohm
- Man with a Racket: The Autobiography of Pancho Gonzales (1959), as told to Cy Rice
- Trabert Cup (2000), Men's 40 and over International Competition
- Cincinnati Tennis Hall of Fame (2002)
