= Jack Tuero =

American tennis player

- Full name: Jack Meredith Tuero
- Country (sports): United States
- Born: July 3, 1926 Waco, Texas, U.S.
- Died: October 27, 2004 (aged 78)

Grand Slam singles results
- US Open: QF (1943)

Grand Slam doubles results
- US Open: F (1945)

Jack Meredith Tuero (July 3, 1926 –- October 27, 2004) was an American tennis player. He is a member of the Louisiana Tennis Hall of Fame. His niece Linda Tuero was also a tennis player.

Tuero was the son of Cuban-born baseball pitcher Oscar Tuero, who played for the St. Louis Cardinals. He lived in various cities growing up as his father had stints at several minor league teams and once he moved to New Orleans he began excelling at tennis. As a 17-year-old in 1943 he made the quarter-finals of the U.S. National Championships.

A varsity tennis player for Tulane University, Tuero won all but one of his 60 conference matches and was the NCAA singles champion in 1949, coming from two sets down against Sam Match in the title decider.

Tuero, a U.S. Clay Court doubles champion, was doubles runner-up at the 1945 U.S. National Championships.

== Grand Slam finals ==
=== Doubles (1 runner-up) ===
Result	Year	Championship	Surface	Partner	Opponents	Score
Loss	1945	U.S. Championships	Grass	(United States) Bob Falkenburg	(United States) Gardnar Mulloy (United States) Bill Talbert	10–12, 10–8, 10–12, 2–6
