= Herbert Flam =

American tennis player

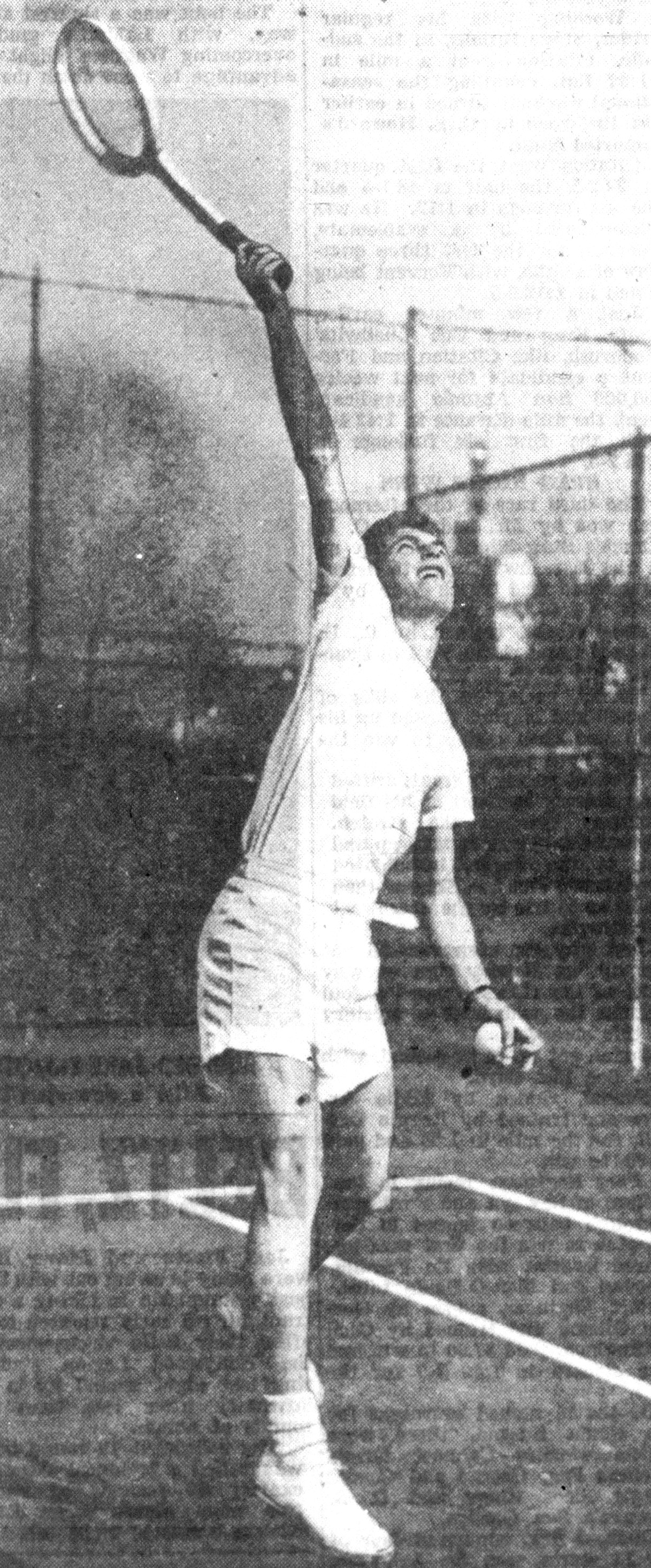
- Flam, circa 1950
- Country (sports): United States
- Born: November 7, 1928; New York City, United States
- Died: November 25, 1980 (aged 52)
- Turned pro: 1945 (amateur tour)
- Retired: 1963
- Plays: Right-handed (one-handed backhand)

Singles
- Career record: 382-131
- Career titles: 20
- Highest ranking: No. 4 (1957, Lance Tingay)

Grand Slam singles results
- Australian Open: SF (1956)
- French Open: F (1957)
- Wimbledon: SF (1951, 1952)
- US Open: F (1950)

Team competitions
- Davis Cup: W (1956, 1957)

Herbert Flam (November 7, 1928 – November 25, 1980) was an American tennis player who was ranked by Lance Tingay as the World No. 4 amateur (and World No. 5 by Adrian Quist) in 1957.

== Biography ==
Flam was born in New York City, and he was Jewish. He reached his first Grand Slam final at the U.S. championships in 1950, beating Bill Talbert and Gardnar Mulloy and then losing to Art Larsen. That year, he was ranked number 2 in the United States.

In 1951, he won the Ojai Tennis Tournament in men's singles. At Wimbledon in 1951, Flam beat Frank Sedgman and the lost to Dick Savitt in the semifinals. That year, he was ranked number 4 in the U.S.

In 1952 at Wimbledon, Flam beat Mulloy and Vic Seixas and then lost in the semifinals to Jaroslav Drobny. That year, he was ranked number 5 in the U.S. In the 1956 Australian Championships, Flam beat Ashley Cooper and then lost in the semifinals to Ken Rosewall. In September 1956 Flam won the singles title at the Pacific Southwest Championships, defeating Rosewall in the final in five sets. That year, he was ranked number 2 in the U.S.

At the 1957 French championships Flam beat Mervyn Rose in a five-set semifinal and then lost in straight sets to Sven Davidson in the final. At the U. S. championships, Flam beat Seixas and then lost to Cooper in the semifinals. That year, he was ranked number 2 in the U.S., behind Seixas.

Flam was inducted into the International Tennis Association Collegiate Tennis Hall of Fame in 1987, into the Southern California Jewish Sports Hall of Fame in 1990, into the International Jewish Sports Hall of Fame in 1992, and into the University of California at Los Angeles Hall of Fame in 2006. In 2017, he was inducted into the Southern California Tennis Association Hall of Fame.

== Grand Slam finals ==
=== Singles (twice runner-up) ===
Result	Year	Championship	Surface	Opponent	Score
Loss	1957	French Championships	Clay	(Sweden) Sven Davidson	3–6, 4–6, 4–6
Loss	1950	U.S. National Championships	Grass	(United States) Art Larsen	3–6, 6–4, 7–5, 4–6, 3–6

== See also ==
- List of select Jewish tennis players
