= Lance Tingay =

British sports journalist and historian (1915–1990)

Lance Tingay (15 July 1915 – 10 March 1990) was a British sports journalist, historian, and author of several tennis books. For many years his annual ranking of top tennis players was "the only one that counted" before ATP rankings were introduced in 1973.

== Career ==
=== Journalism ===
Tingay began his journalism career with the Exchange Telegraph news agency. Tingay claimed that he had watched every Wimbledon Championship beginning since 1932.

During World War II, he served in the Royal Air Force.

Tingay was the tennis correspondent for The Daily Telegraph from 1952 until his retirement in 1981.

=== Books ===
He wrote several books on tennis, including One Hundred Years of Wimbledon, the official volume marking the centenary of the Wimbledon Championships, and Royalty and Lawn Tennis. As a tennis historian, he compiled the data for the tennis yearbook World of Tennis from 1970 until his death in 1990.

=== Rankings and assessments of players ===
During several decades, before the introduction of official computerized rankings, Tingay published his annual World Rankings of the top 10 players.

In The Encyclopedia of Tennis (1973) Tingay listed his personal choices of the greatest players in tennis history. He ranked them in order as Tilden, Budge, Laver, Gonzales and Hoad.

In 1979, he stated that "Lew Hoad was the most virtuoso tennis player I have ever seen, for sure...On the tennis court, Hoad could do anything."

=== Honours ===
In 1982, he was inducted into the International Tennis Hall of Fame. In 1985, he self-published an anthology of the works of English novelist Anthony Trollope. He received the Allison Danzig award for distinguished tennis writing in 1968 and was an honorary member of the All England Lawn Tennis and Croquet Club.

== Bibliography ==
- History of Lawn Tennis in Pictures (1973)
- Tennis: A Pictorial History (1977)
- One Hundred Years of Wimbledon (1977)
- Royalty and Lawn Tennis (1977)
- The Guinness Book of Tennis Facts and Feats (1983)
- The Trollope collector : a record of writings by and books about Anthony Trollope (1985)
