= Andy Paton Jr. =

American tennis player

Andy Paton
- Full name: William Andrew Paton
- Country (sports): United States
- Plays: Right-handed

Grand Slam singles results
- French Open: 1R (1954)
- Wimbledon: 2R (1954)
- US Open: 3R (1948, 1953)

William Andrew Paton is an American former tennis player of the 1940s and 1950s.

Paton, a native of Michigan, took the name of his father, noted accountancy scholar William Andrew Paton.

A collegiate player for the University of Michigan, Paton's tour performances include a Western Indoor Championship title win in 1949 and two singles third round appearances at the U.S. National Championships. In 1954 he reached the second round of the Wimbledon Championships, where he took the 10th seeded Kurt Nielsen to five sets.
