= Jaroslav Drobný =

Czech tennis and ice hockey player

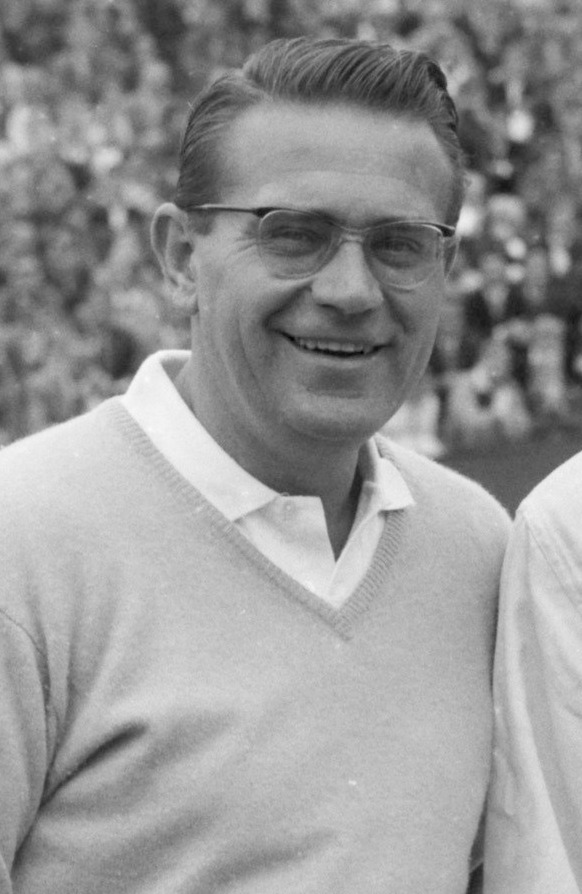
- Drobný in 1958
- Country (sports): Czechoslovakia (until 1939 and 1945–1950) (Protectorate of Bohemia and Moravia) Bohemia and Moravia (1939-1945); Egypt (1950–1959) (United Kingdom) Great Britain (after 1959)
- Born: 12 October 1921 Prague, First Czechoslovak Republic
- Died: 13 September 2001 (aged 79) London, England
- Turned pro: 1938 (amateur tour)
- Retired: 1969
- Plays: Left-handed (one-handed backhand)
- Int. Tennis HoF: 1983 (member page)

Singles
- Career record: 1106–268 (80.5%)
- Career titles: 147
- Highest ranking: No. 1 (1954, Lance Tingay)

Grand Slam singles results
- Australian Open: 2R (1950)
- French Open: W (1951, 1952)
- Wimbledon: W (1954)
- US Open: SF (1947, 1948)

Doubles
- Career record: 0–1 (Open Era)

Grand Slam doubles results
- Australian Open: F (1950)
- French Open: W (1948)
- Wimbledon: F (1951)

Grand Slam mixed doubles results
- French Open: W (1948)
- Wimbledon: SF (1948)
Medal record
Ice hockey
Representing Czechoslovakia
Olympic Games
Silver medal – second place	1948 St. Moritz	Team competition
World Championships
Gold medal – first place	1947 Prague	Team competition

Jaroslav Drobný (Czech pronunciation: [ˈjaroslav ˈdrobniː]; 12 October 1921 – 13 September 2001) was a world No. 1 amateur tennis and ice hockey champion. He left Czechoslovakia in 1949 and travelled as an Egyptian citizen before becoming a citizen of the United Kingdom in 1959, where he died in 2001. In 1951, he became the first and, to date, only Egyptian to win the French Open, while doing likewise at the Wimbledon Championships in 1954. He was inducted into the International Tennis Hall of Fame in 1983. He played internationally for the Czechoslovakia men's national ice hockey team, and was inducted in the International Ice Hockey Federation Hall of Fame.

== Tennis career ==
Drobný began playing tennis at age five, and, as a ball-boy, watched world-class players including compatriot Karel Koželuh. He had an excellent swinging left-handed serve and a good forehand. Drobný played in his first Wimbledon Championship in 1938, losing in the first round to Alejandro Russell. After World War II Drobný was good enough to be able to beat Jack Kramer in the fourth round of the 1946 Wimbledon Championship before losing in the semifinals. In 1951 and 1952, he won the French Open, defeating in the final Eric Sturgess and then retaining the title the following year against Frank Sedgman. Drobný was the losing finalist at Wimbledon in both 1949 and 1952 before finally winning it in 1954 by beating Ken Rosewall for the title, the first left-hander to capture Wimbledon since Norman Brookes.

He won three singles titles at the Italian Championships (1950, 1951, and 1953).

Drobný was ranked World No. 1 amateur in 1954 by Lance Tingay of The Daily Telegraph. He also won the French Open doubles title in 1948, playing with Lennart Bergelin, and he won the mixed doubles title paired with Patricia Canning Todd at 1948 French Open.

Drobný held the distinction of having competed at Wimbledon under four different national identities. In 1938, at the age of 16, he started for his native Czechoslovakia. A year later, following the German invasion and occupation of Czechoslovakia, he was officially representing the Protectorate of Bohemia and Moravia. After World War II, he started at Wimbledon yet again as Czechoslovak but chose to defect from the communist regime in 1949 – he left Czechoslovakia for good on 11 July 1949.

=== Defection ===
After the Czechoslovak coup d'état of 1948, Drobný became increasingly dissatisfied with the way the communist propaganda used him for its purposes. At the time, he was Czechoslovakia's most renowned athlete together with the long-distance runner Emil Zátopek. Increasingly, it was becoming apparent to Drobný that he was no longer able to travel freely to tournaments and he grew dissatisfied with the new regime. This ultimately resulted in his defection from his native land.

Drobný defected from Czechoslovakia together with a fellow Czech Davis Cup player Vladimír Černík while playing at a tennis tournament in Gstaad, Switzerland on 15 July 1949, after disobeying instructions from the USSR government to not play. "All I had", he wrote later, "was a couple of shirts, the proverbial toothbrush and $50." Drobný and Černík were the core of the Czechoslovak Davis Cup team. Twice, the two of them had carried their country to the Davis Cup semifinals, losing to Australia in 1947 and in 1948. Drobný won 37 of his 43 Davis Cup matches.

Becoming stateless, Drobný attempted to gain Swiss, US and Australian papers until finally Egypt offered him citizenship. He represented Egypt at Wimbledon from 1950 through 1959, including his title winning run in 1954. He is the only Egyptian citizen ever to win a Grand Slam tennis tournament. At the time of his Wimbledon win in 1954, Drobný was already living in the United Kingdom (at Lake House, Dormans Park, near East Grinstead, Sussex) but only in his final appearance at Wimbledon in 1960, at the age of 38, did he represent his new homeland Great Britain. The London Gazette announced on 24 July 1959 that he had been 'naturalised' on 8 May the same year.

=== Achievements ===
During his amateur career, Drobný won over 130 singles titles, and was world ranked in the top amateurs 10 from 1946 to 1955. Drobný was inducted in the International Tennis Hall of Fame in Newport, Rhode Island in 1983. He is the only person to win the rare combination of Wimbledon in tennis and a world championship title in ice hockey.

In total, Drobný started in Wimbledon 17 times, always sporting his trademark tinted prescription glasses as an old ice hockey injury affected his eyesight. Drobný is the only male tennis player who ever won a Wimbledon singles title while wearing glasses. Billie Jean King and Martina Navratilova are the only female Wimbledon champions wearing glasses. Arthur Ashe, who was known for playing with spectacles, had switched to contact lenses by the time he won Wimbledon in 1975.

Drobný has won the most clay court titles of any one player (over 90).

== Ice hockey career ==
From 1938 to 1949 Drobný played center in the Czechoslovak ice hockey league. He was a silver medalist with the Czechoslovak ice hockey team in the 1948 Olympics. In the final match, Czechoslovakia and Canada tied goalless but Canada won the gold medal due to a better overall goal average. Drobný scored 9 goals in 8 games at the Olympics. Jaroslav Drobný was also a member of the Czechoslovak national ice hockey team which won the gold medals at the 1947 World Ice Hockey Championships in Prague. He scored 15 goals in 7 games in the tournament including a hat-trick in the decisive victory over USA which gave his country its first ever World Championships title. In 1997, Drobný was inducted in the International Ice Hockey Federation Hall of Fame. Drobný could have become the first ever European player to start in the National Hockey League when the Boston Bruins put him on their reserve in 1949. Apparently, he was offered $20,000 to come over to play for Boston but he refused, preferring to remain playing amateur ice hockey and retain the flexibility to play tennis during the summers. The first European to play in the NHL eventually became Ulf Sterner from Sweden when he started for the New York Rangers for the first time on 27 January 1965.

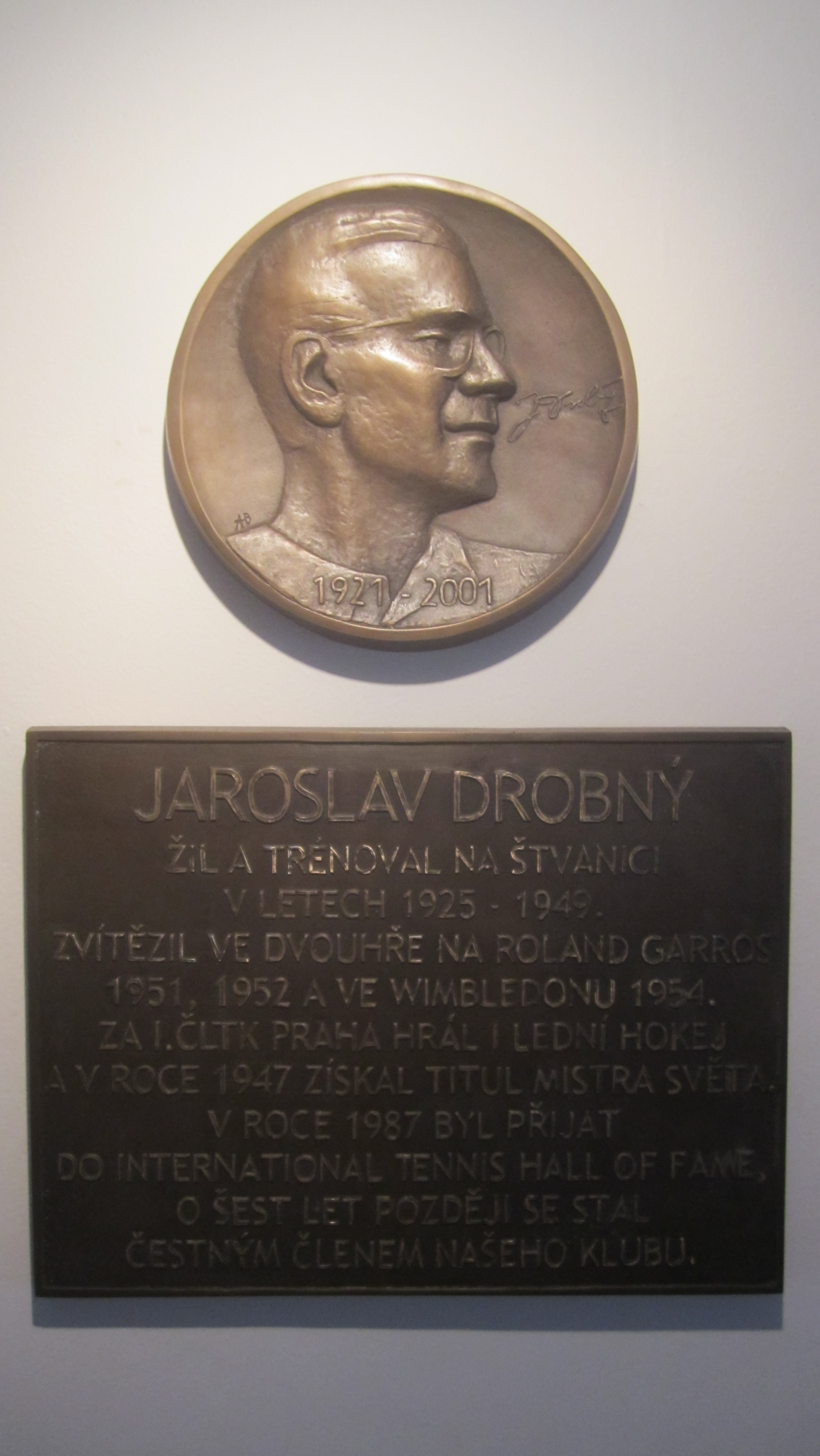
Jaroslav Drobný's plaque at the 1st Czech Lawn Tennis Club in Prague

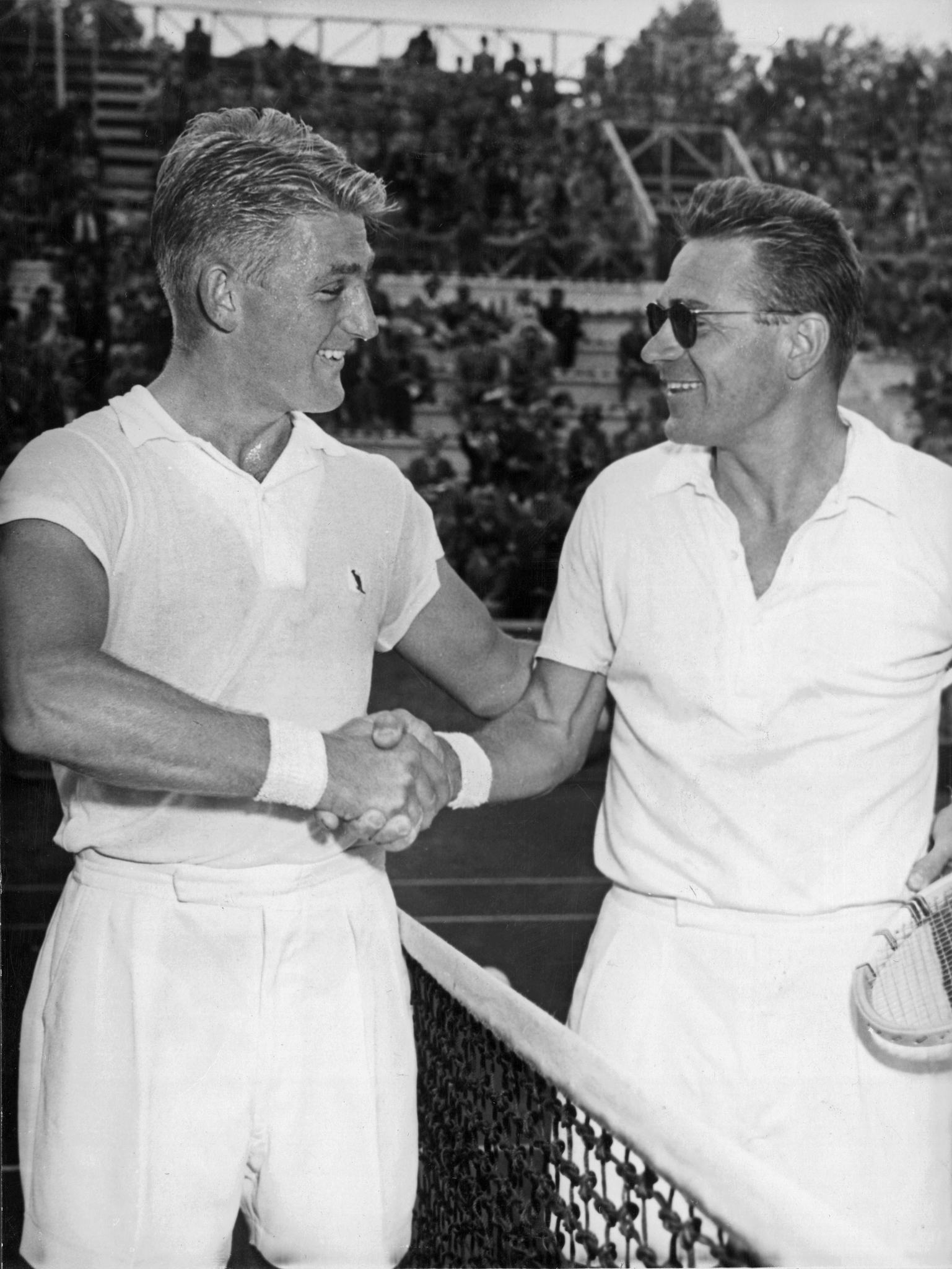
Jaroslav Drobný (r), playing for Egypt, being congratulated by 18-year-old Lew Hoad (l) after Drobný's victory in the final of the 1953 Italian Championships in Rome.

== Autobiography ==
In 1955, Jaroslav Drobný published his autobiography titled Champion in Exile. He was married to Rita Anderson Jarvis, onetime English tournament player. He died 13 September 2001 in Tooting, London a month before his 80th birthday.

== Grand Slam finals ==
=== Singles: 8 (3 titles, 5 runners-up) ===
Result	Year	Championship	Surface	Opponent	Score
Loss	1946	French Championships	Clay	(France) Marcel Bernard	6–3, 6–2, 1–6, 4–6, 3–6
Loss	1948	French Championships	Clay	(United States) Frank Parker	4–6, 5–7, 7–5, 6–8
Loss	1949	Wimbledon	Grass	(United States) Ted Schroeder	6–3, 0–6, 3–6, 6–4, 4–6
Loss	1950	French Championships	Clay	(United States) Budge Patty	1–6, 2–6, 6–3, 7–5, 5–7
Win	1951	French Championships	Clay	(South Africa) Eric Sturgess	6–3, 6–3, 6–3
Win	1952	French Championships (2)	Clay	(Australia) Frank Sedgman	6–2, 6–0, 3–6, 6–4
Loss	1952	Wimbledon	Grass	(Australia) Frank Sedgman	6–4, 2–6, 3–6, 2–6
Win	1954	Wimbledon	Grass	(Australia) Ken Rosewall	13–11, 4–6, 6–2, 9–7

=== Doubles: 4 (1 title, 3 runner-up) ===
Result	Year	Championship	Surface	Partner	Opponents	Score
Win	1948	French Championships	Clay	(Sweden) Lennart Bergelin	(Australia) Harry Hopman (Australia) Frank Sedgman	8–6, 6–1, 12–10
Loss	1950	French Championships	Clay	(United States) Bill Talbert	(United States) Tony Trabert (South Africa) Eric Sturgess	6–2, 1–6, 10–8, 6–2
Loss	1950	Australian Championships	Grass	(South Africa) Eric Sturgess	(Australia) John Bromwich (Australia) Adrian Quist	6–3, 5–7, 4–6, 6–3, 8–6
Loss	1951	Wimbledon	Grass	(South Africa) Eric Sturgess	(Australia) Ken McGregor (Australia) Frank Sedgman	3–6, 6–2, 6–3, 3–6, 6–3

=== Mixed Doubles: 1 (1 title) ===
Result	Year	Championship	Surface	Partner	Opponents	Score
Win	1948	French Championships	Clay	(United States) Patricia Canning Todd	(United States) Doris Hart (Australia) Frank Sedgman	6–3, 3–6, 6–3

== Grand Slam singles performance timeline ==
Key
W	F	SF	QF	#R	RR	Q#	DNQ	A	NH

(W) winner; (F) finalist; (SF) semifinalist; (QF) quarterfinalist; (#R) rounds 4, 3, 2, 1; (RR) round-robin stage; (Q#) qualification round; (DNQ) did not qualify; (A) absent; (NH) not held; (SR) strike rate (events won / competed); (W–L) win–loss record.

Tournament	1938	1939	1940	1941	1942	1943	1944	1945	1946	1947	1948	1949	1950	1951	1952	1953	1954	1955	1956	1957	1958	1959	1960	1961	1962	1963	1964	1965	SR	W–L	Win %
Australian Open	A	A	A	Not held					A	A	A	A	3R	A	A	A	A	A	A	A	A	A	A	A	A	A	A	A	0 / 1	1–1	50%
French Open	A	A	Not held						F	A	F	A	F	W	W	SF	4R	A	4R	2R	4R	4R	2R	A	1R^{1}	3R	2R	1R	2 / 16	46–13	78%
Wimbledon	1R	3R	Not held						SF	QF	2R	F	SF	3R	F	SF	W	QF	1R	2R	4R	1R	1R	A	A	A	A	A	1 / 17	50–16	76%
US Open	A	A	A	A	A	A	A	A	A	SF	SF	QF	3R	A	A	A	A	A	A	A	A	A	A	A	A	A	1R	A	0 / 5	15–5	75%
Win–loss	0–1	2–1							10–2	8–2	12–3	9–2	13–4	8–1	11–1	9–2	10–1	4–1	3–2	2–2	6–2	2–2	1–2		0–0	1–1	1–2	0–1	3 / 39	112–35	76%

^{1} Drobný did not play. His opponent got a walkover.

== In popular culture ==
Ivan Blatný wrote a poem called Wimbledon which addresses Drobný.
