= Charles F. Masterson =

American government official

Charles F. Masterson (October 31, 1917 - May 1998) was the Special Assistant to the President on the White House Staff during the Eisenhower Administration.

Masterson was born in New York, New York and received a B.A. from Long Island University in 1938. He earned a M.A. and a Ph.D. from Columbia University in 1939 and 1952, respectively. Masterson, prior to joining the White House staff, had been in the public relations business in New York City and before that a college professor (English, History and Public Speaking at Long Island University and Pace College in New York).

Shortly after the Eisenhower administration became settled in the White House, there appeared the need to keep the public informed of the current policies, accomplishments and goals of the President and his administration. Thus, shortly after Inauguration Day, Val Peterson (former Governor of Nebraska) was appointed to a position as an Administrative Assistant to President Dwight D. Eisenhower. He was to act as presidential liaison with the various cabinet departments and independent agencies. Upon his leaving in March of that same year to assume the post of Administrator of the Federal Civil Defense Administration, Walter Williams and his (acting) special assistant, Stanley M. Rumbough Jr. assumed the task of liaison between the White House, the cabinet departments and independent agencies. Walter Williams (then Under Secretary of Commerce), originally brought into the White House to establish a system of nationwide economic reporters, resumed his duties at the Commerce Department in late 1953. In September 1953, his position was filled by Charles F. Masterson, a former associate of both Rumbough and Charlie Willis, having worked with them in the National Citizens for Eisenhower organization in the 1952 campaign.

During the period in which Dr. Masterson worked on the White House Staff, the Executive Branch Liaison Office (of which he was a member) performed three major functions. First, it acted as the liaison between the White House, Cabinet departments and the independent agencies. To accomplish this, Masterson and Rumbough brought about the production of Fact Papers. These fact papers were issued weekly. These papers were meant to acquaint members of the Eisenhower team (including ambassadors) with information on current administration problems, pronouncements and goals, in brief, legible form. Fact Papers were duplicated and sent throughout the country by the Young Republicans, the Women's Division of the Republican National Committee and members of the Republican Congressional Committee (who, in turn, sent them to GOP congressmen for use in speeches and newsletters). As of January 1955, actual circulation of the Fact Papers had reached 100,000. Spokesmen for the administration were urged to use the Fact Papers as a ready reference in their speeches and other contacts with the public.

The second function was that of liaison between the White House and the Republican National Committee. The Executive Branch Liaison Office provided Fact Papers for its distribution and for use as copy in its publication (newsletter) "Straight From the Shoulder."

The third function of this office was not as a speakers’ bureau, but as a speakers’ coordination center, i.e. it organized and established a system for using speakers’ bureaus throughout the Executive Branch. This procedure helped greatly to relax the strained national-state party relations.

Aside from his other duties, Dr. Masterson also helped to draft speeches and correspondence for various members of the White House Staff (such as Sherman Adams, Bernard Shanley, Frank Leahy, Governor Pyle and Fred Seaton). He infrequently drafted speeches for use by the President. Dr. Masterson resigned from the staff of the Executive Branch Liaison Office on November 28, 1956, returning, in association with Stanley Rumbough Jr., to a public relations office in New York City.

Dr. Masterson was a man of varied talents. For ten years, he was ranked among the top 25 tennis players in the United States, his highest ranking being 14. He was the author of two books on world history and a beginners book on golf.

Masterson died in May 1998 at the age of 80.
