= James Brink =

American tennis player

- Country (sports): United States
- Born: 18 June 1925
- Died: March 12, 2017 (aged 91)

Grand Slam singles results
- Australian Open: 3R (1948)
- US Open: 4R (1947)

Grand Slam doubles results
- Australian Open: QF (1948)

James Brink (June 18, 1925 – March 12, 2017) was an American tennis player.

While at the University of Washington, Brink advanced to the NCAA semifinals in singles in 1948, and then teamed with Fred Fisher to win the NCAA doubles championship in 1949.

Also in 1949, Brink won the singles titles at the Cincinnati Open.

Brink has been inducted into the University of Washington Athletic Hall of Fame. He died from cancer in March 2017 at the age of 91.
