= Bill Talbert =

American tennis player and administrator

- Talbert at Davis Cup
- Full name: William Franklin Talbert
- Country (sports): United States
- Born: September 4, 1918 Cincinnati, Ohio, US
- Died: February 28, 1999 (aged 80) New York City, US
- Plays: Right-handed
- Int. Tennis HoF: 1967 (member page)

Singles
- Career record: 651-201 (76.4%)
- Career titles: 49
- Highest ranking: No. 3 (1949, John Olliff)

Grand Slam singles results
- Australian Open: 2R (1947)
- French Open: SF (1950)
- Wimbledon: QF (1950)
- US Open: F (1944, 1945)

Grand Slam doubles results
- Australian Open: QF (1947, 1954)
- French Open: W (1950)
- US Open: W (1942, 1945, 1946, 1948)

Grand Slam mixed doubles results
- French Open: F (1950)
- US Open: W (1943, 1944, 1945, 1946)

William Franklin Talbert (September 4, 1918 – February 28, 1999) was an American tennis player and administrator.

== Tennis career ==
He was ranked in the U.S. top 10 from 1941 to 1954, and he was ranked World No. 3 in 1949 by John Olliff of The Daily Telegraph. He won nine Grand Slam doubles titles, and also reached the men's doubles finals of the U.S. National Championship nine times, mainly with Gardnar Mulloy, his favorite partner. He also was a Davis Cup player and one of the more successful Davis Cup captains in U.S. history.

Talbert was a Type 1 diabetic, one of the few known to be in sports at a highly competitive level, and for many years he was held up as an example of how this disease could be surmounted.

Born in Cincinnati, Ohio, Talbert still holds records at the Cincinnati Open in his hometown. His records are for most doubles titles (six), most total finals appearances (14), and most singles finals appearances (seven). He won three singles titles (in 1943, 1945 and 1947), and his six doubles titles came in 1943, 1944, 1945, 1947, 1951 and 1954.

Talbert reached the final of the U.S. Championships in 1944 and 1945 (losing both finals to Frank Parker). He also reached the semifinals of the French championships in 1950, losing to Budge Patty 13–11 in the fifth set).

Talbert also won the singles title at the U.S. Clay Court Championships in 1945 defeating Pancho Segura in a five set final, and was a finalist in 1946 and 1943. He won the Eastern Clay Court Championships in 1949. In 1950 he won the Paris International Championships.

Before starting on the international tour, he played for the University of Cincinnati and won an Ohio State singles title in 1936 while at Cincinnati's Hughes High School.

Talbert was enshrined into the International Tennis Hall of Fame in 1967 and was in the first class, along with his former protégé Tony Trabert, enshrined into the Cincinnati Tennis Hall of Fame in 2002. After his playing career, he wrote tennis books, including the best seller The Game of Doubles in Tennis with Bruce Old in 1977; served as a tennis commentator for NBC Sports; and was the tournament director of the US Open.

== Grand Slam finals ==
=== Singles (2 runners-up) ===
Result	Year	Championship	Surface	Opponent	Score
Loss	1944	U.S. Championships	Grass	(United States) Frank Parker	4–6, 6–3, 3–6, 3–6
Loss	1945	U.S. Championships	Grass	(United States) Frank Parker	12–14, 1–6, 2–6

=== Doubles (5 titles, 5 runners-up) ===
Result	Year	Championship	Surface	Partner	Opponents	Score
Win	1942	U.S. Championships	Grass	(United States) Gardnar Mulloy	(United States) Ted Schroeder (United States) Sidney Wood	9–7, 7–5, 6–1
Loss	1943	U.S. Championships	Grass	(United States) David Freeman	(United States) Jack Kramer (United States) Frank Parker	2–6, 4–6, 4–6
Loss	1944	U.S. Championships	Grass	(United States) Pancho Segura	(United States) Don McNeill (United States) Bob Falkenburg	5–7, 4–6, 6–3, 1–6
Win	1945	U.S. Championships	Grass	(United States) Gardnar Mulloy	(United States) Bob Falkenburg (United States) Jack Tuero	12–10, 8–10, 12–10, 6–2
Win	1946	U.S. Championships	Grass	(United States) Gardnar Mulloy	(United States) Don McNeill (United States) Frank Guernsey	3–6, 6–4, 2–6, 6–3, 20–18
Loss	1947	U.S. Championships	Grass	(Australia) Bill Sidwell	(United States) Jack Kramer (United States) Ted Schroeder	4–6, 5–7, 3–6
Win	1948	U.S. Championships	Grass	(United States) Gardnar Mulloy	(United States) Frank Parker (United States) Ted Schroeder	1–6, 9–7, 6–3, 3–6, 9–7
Win	1950	French Championships	Clay	(United States) Tony Trabert	(Egypt) Jaroslav Drobný (South Africa) Eric Sturgess	6–2, 1–6, 10–8, 6–2
Loss	1950	U.S. Championships	Grass	(United States) Gardnar Mulloy	(Australia) John Bromwich (Australia) Frank Sedgman	5–7, 6–8, 6–3, 1–6
Loss	1953	U.S. Championships	Grass	(United States) Gardnar Mulloy	(Australia) Rex Hartwig (Australia) Mervyn Rose	4–6, 6–4, 2–6, 4–6

=== Mixed Doubles (4 titles, 3 runners-up) ===
Result	Year	Championship	Surface	Partner	Opponents	Score
Win	1943	U.S. Championships	Grass	(United States) Margaret Osborne	(United States) Pauline Betz (United States) Pancho Segura	10–6, 6–4
Win	1944	U.S. Championships	Grass	(United States) Margaret Osborne	(United States) Dorothy Bundy (United States) Don McNeill	6–2, 6–3
Win	1945	U.S. Championships	Grass	(United States) Margaret Osborne	(United States) Doris Hart (United States) Bob Falkenburg	6–4, 6–4
Win	1946	U.S. Championships	Grass	(United States) Margaret Osborne	(United States) Louise Brough (United States) Robert Kimbrell	6–3, 6–4
Loss	1948	U.S. Championships	Grass	(United States) Margaret Osborne duPont	(United States) Louise Brough (United States) Tom Brown	4–6, 4–6
Loss	1949	U.S. Championships	Grass	(United States) Margaret Osborne duPont	(United States) Louise Brough (South Africa) Eric Sturgess	6–4, 3–6, 5–7
Loss	1950	French Championships	Clay	(United States) Patricia Canning Todd	(United States) Barbara Scofield (Argentina) Enrique Morea	w.o.
