= 1954 Wimbledon Championships – Men's doubles =

Men's doubles
- 1954 Wimbledon Championships

Final
- Champions: (Australia) Rex Hartwig (Australia) Mervyn Rose
- Runners-up: (United States) Vic Seixas (United States) Tony Trabert
- Score: 6–4, 6–4, 3–6, 6–4

Details
- Draw: 64 (5Q)
- Seeds: 4

Events
Singles	men	women		boys	girls
Doubles	men	women	mixed	boys	girls
- Wimbledon Championships

Lew Hoad and Ken Rosewall were the defending champions, but lost in the semifinals to Vic Seixas and Tony Trabert.

Rex Hartwig and Mervyn Rose defeated Seixas and Trabert in the final, 6–4, 6–4, 3–6, 6–4 to win the gentlemen's doubles tennis title at the 1954 Wimbledon Championship.

== Seeds ==
1. (Australia) Rex Hartwig / (Australia) Mervyn Rose (champions)
2. (United States) Vic Seixas / (United States) Tony Trabert (final)
3. (Australia) Lew Hoad / (Australia) Ken Rosewall (semifinals)
4. (United States) Gardnar Mulloy / (United States) Budge Patty (semifinals)

Click on the seed number of a player to go to their draw section.

== Draw ==
Key

- Q = Qualifier
- WC = Wild card
- LL = Lucky loser
- Alt = Alternate
- ITF = ITF entry
- PR = Protected ranking
- SR = Special ranking
- SE = Special exempt
- JE = Junior exempt
- JR = Junior Accelerator Programme entrant
- CO = College Accelerator Programme entrant
- NG = Next Gen Accelerator Program entrant
- w/o = Walkover
- r = Retired
- d = Defaulted

=== Finals ===
Quarterfinals
2	(United States) Vic Seixas (United States) Tony Trabert	6	4	3	6	6
(New Zealand) Mark Otway (New Zealand) Jeff Robson	1	6	6	2	3
3	(Australia) Lew Hoad (Australia) Ken Rosewall	6	6	12
(New Zealand) John Barry (United States) Hal Burrows	2	4	10
(United States) Hugh Stewart (Brazil) Armando Vieira	6	4	4
4	(United States) Gardnar Mulloy (United States) Budge Patty	8	6	6
(South Africa) Abe Segal (South Africa) Owen Williams	6	18	3
1	(Australia) Rex Hartwig (Australia) Mervyn Rose	8	20	6

Semifinals
2	(United States) Vic Seixas (United States) Tony Trabert	6	7	3	4	8
3	(Australia) Lew Hoad (Australia) Ken Rosewall	3	5	6	6	6
4	(United States) Gardnar Mulloy (United States) Budge Patty	6	4	2	1
1	(Australia) Rex Hartwig (Australia) Mervyn Rose	4	6	6	6

Final
2	(United States) Vic Seixas (United States) Tony Trabert	4	4	6	4
1	(Australia) Rex Hartwig (Australia) Mervyn Rose	6	6	3	6

=== Top half ===
==== Section 1 ====
First round
2	(United States) Vic Seixas (United States) Tony Trabert	6	6	6
(Republic of Ireland) Cyril Kemp (Iran) Matthew Mohtadi	0	2	2
(United States) Herbie Flam (United States) Art Larsen	6	6	3	6
(France) Jean Borotra (United States) Andy Paton	4	4	6	2
(Federation of Rhodesia and Nyasaland) Basil Katz (Australia) Peter Molloy	13	6	6	6
(United Kingdom) Colin Baxter (United Kingdom) Ian Campbell	11	8	3	3
(United Kingdom) Roger Becker (United Kingdom) Tony Pickard	6	3	6	11
(United Kingdom) Tommy Anderson (India) Ramanathan Krishnan	4	6	3	9
(United Kingdom) Henry Billington (United Kingdom) Don Butler	6	6	6
(United Kingdom) Bob Lee (South Africa) David Samaai	2	4	4
(France) Jean-Noël Grinda (France) Paul Rémy	2	1^{r}
(Republic of Ireland) Gerry Fitzpatrick (Republic of Ireland) Guy Jackson	6	0
(Brazil) Bob Falkenburg (United States) Gilbert Shea	4	6	6	2	6
(United Kingdom) Billy Knight (United Kingdom) Bobby Wilson	6	4	4	6	2
(Federation of Rhodesia and Nyasaland) Don Black (South Africa) Leon Norgarb	2	2	1
(New Zealand) Mark Otway (New Zealand) Jeff Robson	6	6	6

Second round
2	(United States) V Seixas (United States) A Trabert	2	6	6	6
(United States) H Flam (United States) A Larsen	6	2	0	1
(Federation of Rhodesia and Nyasaland) B Katz (Australia) P Molloy	2	6	6	3	4
(United Kingdom) R Becker (United Kingdom) A Pickard	6	3	4	6	6
(United Kingdom) H Billington (United Kingdom) D Butler	7	6	8
(Republic of Ireland) G Fitzpatrick (Republic of Ireland) G Jackson	5	4	6
(Brazil) R Falkenburg (United States) G Shea	4	4	6	8	5
(New Zealand) M Otway (New Zealand) J Robson	6	6	3	6	7

Third round
2	(United States) V Seixas (United States) A Trabert	5	6	10	6
(United Kingdom) R Becker (United Kingdom) A Pickard	7	3	8	3
(United Kingdom) H Billington (United Kingdom) D Butler	2	3	2
(New Zealand) M Otway (New Zealand) J Robson	6	6	6

Quarterfinals
2	(United States) V Seixas (United States) A Trabert	6	4	3	6	6
(New Zealand) M Otway (New Zealand) J Robson	1	6	6	2	3

==== Section 2 ====
First round
3	(Australia) Lew Hoad (Australia) Ken Rosewall	7	6	6	4	6
(Belgium) Jacques Brichant (Belgium) Philippe Washer	9	3	4	6	2
(Hong Kong) Ip Koon Hung (Hong Kong) Edwin Tsai	6	6	7
(Belgium) Pierre Geelhand de Merxem (Australia) Harry Hopman	2	4	5
(Denmark) Kurt Nielsen (Denmark) Torben Ulrich	w/o
(United Kingdom) Eric Filby (Australia) Doug Reid
(Sweden) Lennart Bergelin (Sweden) Sven Davidson	6	6	7
(Socialist Federal Republic of Yugoslavia) Josip Palada (Socialist Federal Republic of Yugoslavia) Vladimir Petrović	4	2	5
(Spain) Jaime Bartrolí (Netherlands) Fred Dehnert	4	4	3
(Uruguay) Eduardo Argon (Australia) Jack Arkinstall	6	6	6
Q	(United Kingdom) Colin Hannam (United Kingdom) Ivor Warwick	4	6	1	4
(Italy) Giorgio Fachini (Italy) Nicola Pietrangeli	6	3	6	6
(Argentina) Hector Etchart (Argentina) Eduardo Soriano	2	3	6	6
(Australia) Neale Fraser (United States) Gene Garrett	6	6	3	8
(Poland) Czesław Spychała (Poland) Ignacy Tłoczyński	6	2	0
(New Zealand) John Barry (United States) Hal Burrows	8	6	6

Second round
3	(Australia) L Hoad (Australia) K Rosewall	6	8	6
(Hong Kong) K-H Ip (Hong Kong) E Tsai	4	6	3
(United Kingdom) E Filby (Australia) D Reid	0	2	4
(Sweden) L Bergelin (Sweden) S Davidson	6	6	6
(Uruguay) E Argon (Australia) J Arkinstall	8	7	6
(Italy) G Fachini (Italy) N Pietrangeli	6	5	2
(Australia) N Fraser (United States) W Garrett	5	6	6	8	5
(New Zealand) J Barry (United States) H Burrows	7	4	3	10	7

Third round
3	(Australia) L Hoad (Australia) K Rosewall	6	6	6
(Sweden) L Bergelin (Sweden) S Davidson	4	4	4
(Uruguay) E Argon (Australia) J Arkinstall	2	3	9	2
(New Zealand) J Barry (United States) H Burrows	6	6	7	6

Quarterfinals
3	(Australia) L Hoad (Australia) K Rosewall	6	6	12
(New Zealand) J Barry (United States) H Burrows	2	4	10

=== Bottom half ===
==== Section 3 ====
First round
(United Kingdom) Bernard Crouch (United Kingdom) Gerry Piercy	1	3	3
(United Kingdom) John Barrett (Trinidad and Tobago) Ian McDonald	6	6	6
(France) Philippe Chatrier (France) Jean-Claude Molinari	3	4	5
(United States) Hugh Stewart (Brazil) Armando Vieira	6	6	7
(Switzerland) Erwin Balestra (Switzerland) Zsigmond Zorny	1	2	7
LL	(Australia) Dawson Hamilton (Australia) Bruce Robinson	6	6	9
(United States) Malcolm Fox (Chile) Andrés Hammersley	7	3	2	6	9
(United Kingdom) Eric Bulmer (United Kingdom) Reg Kaley	5	6	6	3	7
(Austria) Hans Redl (Austria) Franz Saiko	6	6	7
(United Kingdom) Headley Baxter (United Kingdom) Claude Lister	3	4	5
(United Kingdom) Tim Lewis (Norway) Finn Søhol	5	2	6	6	6
Q	(United Kingdom) John Draper (United Kingdom) Ian King	7	6	1	4	4
(United Kingdom) Geoff Ward (United Kingdom) John Ward	4	9	13	9
(South Africa) Gordon Forbes (South Africa) Gordon Talbot	6	7	11	7
Q	(United Kingdom) Derrick Lester (United Kingdom) Bobby Thorn	2	3	3
4	(United States) Gardnar Mulloy (United States) Budge Patty	6	6	6

Second round
(United Kingdom) J Barrett (Trinidad and Tobago) I McDonald	4	3	6	3
(United States) H Stewart (Brazil) A Vieira	6	6	4	6
LL	(Australia) D Hamilton (Australia) B Robinson	6	6	6
(United States) M Fox (Chile) A Hammersley	2	3	4
(Austria) H Redl (Austria) F Saiko	3	6	6	6
(United Kingdom) N Lewis (Norway) F Søhol	6	2	3	2
(United Kingdom) G Ward (United Kingdom) J Ward	0	6	4
4	(United States) G Mulloy (United States) J Patty	6	8	6

Third round
(United States) H Stewart (Brazil) A Vieira	6	6	6
(Australia) D Hamilton (Australia) B Robinson	1	2	2
(Austria) H Redl (Austria) F Saiko	2	3	3
4	(United States) G Mulloy (United States) J Patty	6	6	6

Quarterfinals
(United States) H Stewart (Brazil) A Vieira	6	4	4
4	(United States) G Mulloy (United States) J Patty	8	6	6

==== Section 4 ====
First round
(United Kingdom) Stan Clark (United Kingdom) Cliff Hovell	0	3	6	3
(United States) John Ager (United States) Tony Vincent	6	6	3	6
(Belgium) Ivan Devroe (Belgium) Jacques Peten	2	5	0
(Sweden) Ulf Schmidt (Sweden) Staffan Stockenberg	6	7	6
(United Kingdom) Mike Davies (United Kingdom) Gerry Oakley	7	6	2	6
(India) Naresh Kumar (India) Narendra Nath	5	3	6	4
(South Africa) Abe Segal (South Africa) Owen Williams	6	6	6
Q	(United Kingdom) RG Harris (United Kingdom) Jimmy Wilson	1	2	2
(United Kingdom) Tony Mottram (United Kingdom) Geoffrey Paish	6	6	4	4	6
(Australia) Bob Howe (Australia) Geoff Pryor	2	1	6	6	2
(France) Alain Lemyze (France) Francis Nys	6	5	6	6
Q	(United Kingdom) Tony Clayton (Australia) Ian Coghill	3	7	4	3
(Canada) Robert Bédard (Canada) Lorne Main	4	6	5	6	4
(Australia) Ashley Cooper (Australia) Roy Emerson	6	4	7	4	6
(Italy) Gianni Clerici (Italy) Orlando Sirola	1	2	2
1	(Australia) Rex Hartwig (Australia) Mervyn Rose	6	6	6

Second round
(United States) J Ager (United States) A Vincent	6	6	4	2	5
(Sweden) U Schmidt (Sweden) S Stockenberg	2	3	6	6	7
(United Kingdom) M Davies (United Kingdom) G Oakley	3	5	7	7	5
(South Africa) A Segal (South Africa) O Williams	6	7	5	5	7
(United Kingdom) A Mottram (United Kingdom) G Paish	6	6	6
(France) A Lemyze (France) F Nys	3	2	2
(Australia) A Cooper (Australia) R Emerson	2	3	3
1	(Australia) R Hartwig (Australia) M Rose	6	6	6

Third round
(Sweden) U Schmidt (Sweden) S Stockenberg	3	2	2
(South Africa) A Segal (South Africa) O Williams	6	6	6
(United Kingdom) A Mottram (United Kingdom) G Paish	3	2	3
1	(Australia) R Hartwig (Australia) M Rose	6	6	6

Quarterfinals
(South Africa) A Segal (South Africa) O Williams	6	18	3
1	(Australia) R Hartwig (Australia) M Rose	8	20	6
