= 1954 Wimbledon Championships – Mixed doubles =

Mixed doubles
- 1954 Wimbledon Championships

Final
- Champions: (United States) Vic Seixas (United States) Doris Hart
- Runners-up: (Australia) Ken Rosewall (United States) Margaret duPont
- Score: 5–7, 6–4, 6–3

Details
- Draw: 80 (5Q)
- Seeds: 4

Events
Singles	men	women		boys	girls
Doubles	men	women	mixed	boys	girls
- Wimbledon Championships

Vic Seixas and Doris Hart successfully defended their title, defeating Ken Rosewall and Margaret duPont in the final, 5–7, 6–4, 6–3 to win the mixed doubles tennis title at the 1954 Wimbledon Championships.

== Seeds ==
1. (United States) Vic Seixas / (United States) Doris Hart (champions)
2. (Australia) Lew Hoad / (United States) Maureen Connolly (semifinals)
3. (Australia) Ken Rosewall / (United States) Margaret duPont (final)
4. (Australia) Rex Hartwig / (United States) Betty Pratt (quarterfinals)

Click on the seed number of a player to go to their draw section.

== Draw ==
Key

- Q = Qualifier
- WC = Wild card
- LL = Lucky loser
- Alt = Alternate
- ITF = ITF entry
- PR = Protected ranking
- SR = Special ranking
- SE = Special exempt
- JE = Junior exempt
- JR = Junior Accelerator Programme entrant
- CO = College Accelerator Programme entrant
- NG = Next Gen Accelerator Program entrant
- w/o = Walkover
- r = Retired
- d = Defaulted

=== Finals ===
Quarterfinals
1	(United States) Vic Seixas (United States) Doris Hart	6	6
(Australia) Peter Molloy (South Africa) Audrey Bilse	3	1
4	(Australia) Rex Hartwig (United States) Betty Pratt	5	3
(New Zealand) Mark Otway (New Zealand) Judy Burke	7	6
(South Africa) Owen Williams (United Kingdom) Mary Halford	4	0
3	(Australia) Ken Rosewall (United States) Margaret duPont	6	6
(France) Jean-Claude Molinari (France) Nelly Adamson	3	2
2	(Australia) Lew Hoad (United States) Maureen Connolly	6	6

Semifinals
1	(United States) Vic Seixas (United States) Doris Hart	6	6
(New Zealand) Mark Otway (New Zealand) Judy Burke	4	1
3	(Australia) Ken Rosewall (United States) Margaret duPont	6	6	6
2	(Australia) Lew Hoad (United States) Maureen Connolly	8	4	4

Final
1	(United States) Vic Seixas (United States) Doris Hart	5	6	6
3	(Australia) Ken Rosewall (United States) Margaret duPont	7	4	3

=== Top half ===
==== Section 1 ====
First round

Second round
1	(United States) Vic Seixas (United States) Doris Hart	6	6
(Italy) Giorgio Fachini (Italy) Nicla Migliori	1	2
(United States) Gene Garrett (Canada) Hanna Sladek	3	6	3
(France) Philippe Chatrier (France) Suzanne Schmitt	6	4	6
(Canada) Lorne Main (Switzerland) Violette Alvensleben-Rigollet	10	3	9
Q	(United Kingdom) Martin Hime (New Zealand) Evelyn Attwood	8	6	7
(Belgium) Philippe Washer (Bermuda) Heather Brewer	4	4
(United Kingdom) Leslie Cater (United Kingdom) Leonie Brighton	6	6

Third round
1	(United States) V Seixas (United States) D Hart	6	6
(France) P Chatrier (France) S Schmitt	1	1
(Canada) L Main (Switzerland) V Alvensleben-Rigollet	7	6	6
(United Kingdom) L Cater (United Kingdom) L Brighton	9	4	4

Fourth round
1	(United States) V Seixas (United States) D Hart	6	6
(Canada) L Main (Switzerland) V Alvensleben-Rigollet	2	1

==== Section 2 ====
First round

Second round
(Brazil) Armando Vieira (United States) Dorothy Levine	6	6
(United Kingdom) Claude Lister (United Kingdom) Thelma Lister	2	3
(Sweden) Sven Davidson (Sweden) Margarita Bonström	9	2	3
(Australia) Neale Fraser (France) Ginette Bucaille	7	6	6
(Poland) Ignacy Tłoczyński (United Kingdom) Bea Walter	3	3
(Australia) Peter Molloy (South Africa) Audrey Bilse	6	6
(India) Ramanathan Krishnan (India) Rita Davar	6	2	4
(United Kingdom) Ron Statham (United Kingdom) Helen Fletcher	3	6	6

Third round
(Brazil) A Vieira (United States) D Levine	1	4
(Australia) N Fraser (France) G Bucaille	6	6
(Australia) P Molloy (South Africa) A Bilse	1	7	7
(United Kingdom) R Statham (United Kingdom) H Fletcher	6	5	5

Fourth round
(Australia) N Fraser (France) G Bucaille	3	7
(Australia) P Molloy (South Africa) A Bilse	6	9

==== Section 3 ====
First round

Second round
4	(Australia) Rex Hartwig (United States) Betty Pratt	6	8
(United States) Tony Vincent (Argentina) Elena Lehmann	3	6
(Austria) Franz Saiko (Austria) Helga Strecker	6	5	5
(Norway) Finn Søhol (United Kingdom) Mary Harris	4	7	7
(United Kingdom) John White (United Kingdom) Margaret Burrows	7	3
(United Kingdom) Geoff Ward (United Kingdom) Rosemary Walsh	9	6
(Australia) Harry Hopman (Australia) Nell Hopman	0	4
(Federation of Rhodesia and Nyasaland) Basil Katz (United States) Barbara Kimbrell	6	6

Third round
4	(Australia) R Hartwig (United States) E Pratt	6	6
(Norway) F Søhol (United Kingdom) M Harris	2	4
(United Kingdom) G Ward (United Kingdom) R Walsh	1	3
(Federation of Rhodesia and Nyasaland) B Katz (United States) B Kimbrell	6	6

Fourth round
4	(Australia) R Hartwig (United States) E Pratt	11	6
(Federation of Rhodesia and Nyasaland) B Katz (United States) B Kimbrell	9	4

==== Section 4 ====
First round
(United Kingdom) Ivor Warwick (United Kingdom) Pat Hird	3	6	7
(India) Narendra Nath (United Kingdom) Mary Eyre	6	3	5
(United Kingdom) Henry Billington (United Kingdom) Susan Billington	1	5
(Iran) Matthew Mohtadi (United Kingdom) Barbara Knapp	6	7
(New Zealand) Mark Otway (New Zealand) Judy Burke	6	6
(Canada) Robert Bédard (France) Jacqueline Kermina	2	3
(Republic of Ireland) Guy Jackson (United Kingdom) Lorna Cawthorn	7	4
(India) Naresh Kumar (United Kingdom) Freda Hammersley	9	6
(United States) Hal Burrows (United Kingdom) Pat Ward	6	6
(United Kingdom) Billy Knight (United Kingdom) Jean Knight	2	0
(United Kingdom) Gerry Oakley (United Kingdom) Gem Hoahing	w/o
(United Kingdom) Tony Pickard (United Kingdom) Pat Harrison
(Netherlands) Fred Dehnert (Netherlands) Joopy Roos-Van der Wal	11	6
(Australia) Dawson Hamilton (United Kingdom) Joan Quelch	9	2
Q	(Republic of Ireland) Bruce Haughton (Australia) Nancy Liebert	2	3
(United Kingdom) Roy Wilson (United Kingdom) Bobbie Wilson	6	6

Second round
(United Kingdom) I Warwick (United Kingdom) P Hird	4	0
(Iran) M Mohtadi (United Kingdom) B Knapp	6	6
(New Zealand) M Otway (New Zealand) J Burke	7	6	6
(India) N Kumar (United Kingdom) W Hammersley	9	1	0
(United States) H Burrows (United Kingdom) P Ward	6	6
(United Kingdom) A Pickard (United Kingdom) P Harrison	3	2
(Netherlands) A Dehnert (Netherlands) F Roos-Van der Wal	7	6	3
(United Kingdom) R Wilson (United Kingdom) B Wilson	9	2	6

Third round
(Iran) M Mohtadi (United Kingdom) B Knapp	1	2
(New Zealand) M Otway (New Zealand) J Burke	6	6
(United States) H Burrows (United Kingdom) P Ward	6	6
(United Kingdom) R Wilson (United Kingdom) B Wilson	3	4

Fourth round
(New Zealand) M Otway (New Zealand) J Burke	6	6
(United States) H Burrows (United Kingdom) P Ward	4	3

=== Bottom half ===
==== Section 5 ====
First round
(United Kingdom) Headley Baxter (United Kingdom) Billie Woodgate	6	5
(France) Jean Borotra (United Kingdom) Jennifer Middleton	8	7
Q	(South Africa) Gordon Forbes (South Africa) Joan Scott	6	6
(Austria) Hans Redl (Austria) Elizabeth Broz	3	2
(United Kingdom) John Barrett (Netherlands) Fenny ten Bosch	2	6	7
(Spain) Jaime Bartrolí (Spain) María Josefa de Riba	6	2	5
LL	(United Kingdom) Eddie Ford (United Kingdom) Patsy Ford	1	4
(South Africa) Owen Williams (United Kingdom) Mary Halford	6	6
(Australia) Geoff Pryor (United Kingdom) Vera Thomas	2	2
(South Africa) Abe Segal (United States) Dean Folger	6	6
(Federation of Rhodesia and Nyasaland) Don Black (United Kingdom) Gem Gilbert	4	0
(South Africa) Leon Norgarb (United Kingdom) Viola White	6	6
(New Zealand) Jeff Robson (New Zealand) Heather Robson	6	6
(New Zealand) John Barry (United States) Baba Lewis	3	2
(United Kingdom) Dennis Brown (United Kingdom) Lorna White	3	0
(United Kingdom) Don Butler (United Kingdom) Rosemary Bulleid	6	6

Second round
(France) J Borotra (United Kingdom) J Middleton	2	6	6
Q	(South Africa) G Forbes (South Africa) J Scott	6	1	2
(United Kingdom) J Barrett (Netherlands) F ten Bosch	4	4
(South Africa) O Williams (United Kingdom) M Halford	6	6
(South Africa) A Segal (United States) D Folger	6	7
(South Africa) L Norgarb (United Kingdom) V White	4	5
(New Zealand) J Robson (New Zealand) H Robson	7	6
(United Kingdom) D Butler (United Kingdom) R Bulleid	5	4

Third round
(France) J Borotra (United Kingdom) J Middleton	3	5
(South Africa) O Williams (United Kingdom) M Halford	6	7
(South Africa) A Segal (United States) D Folger	2	3
(New Zealand) J Robson (New Zealand) H Robson	6	6

Fourth round
(South Africa) O Williams (United Kingdom) M Halford	6	2	6
(New Zealand) J Robson (New Zealand) H Robson	1	6	4

==== Section 6 ====
First round

Second round
Q	(South Africa) Gordon Talbot (Australia) Kay Neville-Smith	0	7
(Hong Kong) Edwin Tsai (United States) Kay Hubbell	6	9
Q	(United Kingdom) Peter Moys (United Kingdom) Marian Boundy	7	6
(Chile) Andrés Hammersley (France) Annie Soisbault	5	2
(United States) John Ager (United Kingdom) Peggy Dawson-Scott	7	6
(Italy) Nicola Pietrangeli (Italy) Silvana Lazzarino	5	4
(Australia) Jack Arkinstall (Egypt) Betsy Abbas	3	2
3	(Australia) Ken Rosewall (United States) Margaret duPont	6	6

Third round
(Hong Kong) E Tsai (United States) K Hubbell	6	4	5
Q	(United Kingdom) P Moys (United Kingdom) M Boundy	3	6	7
(United States) J Ager (United Kingdom) P Dawson-Scott	3	2
3	(Australia) K Rosewall (United States) M duPont	6	6

Fourth round
Q	(United Kingdom) P Moys (United Kingdom) M Boundy	3	2
3	(Australia) K Rosewall (United States) M duPont	6	6

==== Section 7 ====
First round

Second round
(United Kingdom) Geoffrey Paish (United Kingdom) Anne Shilcock	6	6
(Belgium) Jacques Brichant (Belgium) Christiane Mercelis	3	2
(United Kingdom) Colin Hannam (United Kingdom) Georgie Woodgate	6	6
(United Kingdom) Tommy Anderson (Switzerland) Ruth Kaufmann	3	3
(Australia) Doug Reid (Argentina) Edda Buding	5	6	9
(Australia) Bob Howe (Mexico) Melita Ramírez	7	4	7
(Australia) Ashley Cooper (United Kingdom) Elaine Watson	6	3	4
(France) Jean-Claude Molinari (France) Nelly Adamson	3	6	6

Third round
(United Kingdom) G Paish (United Kingdom) A Shilcock	8	7	3
(United Kingdom) C Hannam (United Kingdom) G Woodgate	10	5	6
(Australia) D Reid (Argentina) E Buding	8	5	3
(France) J-C Molinari (France) N Adamson	6	7	6

Fourth round
(United Kingdom) C Hannam (United Kingdom) G Woodgate	7	2
(France) J-C Molinari (France) N Adamson	9	6

==== Section 8 ====
First round

Second round
(Hong Kong) Ip Koon Hung (United Kingdom) Valerie Lewis	6	6
(United Kingdom) Ian Campbell (United Kingdom) Jean Petchell	4	3
(United Kingdom) Mike Davies (United Kingdom) Doreen Spiers	7	1	6
(United States) Hugh Stewart (United States) Barbara Bradley	5	6	4
(United Kingdom) Warwick Shute (United Kingdom) Denise Collier	4	4
(Australia) Roy Emerson (United Kingdom) Valerie Pitt	6	6
(Sweden) Staffan Stockenberg (West Germany) Ingeborg Vogler	1	0
2	(Australia) Lew Hoad (United States) Maureen Connolly	6	6

Third round
(Hong Kong) K-H Ip (United Kingdom) V Lewis	10	6
(United Kingdom) M Davies (United Kingdom) D Spiers	8	3
(Australia) R Emerson (United Kingdom) V Pitt	3	4
2	(Australia) L Hoad (United States) M Connolly	6	6

Fourth round
(Hong Kong) K-H Ip (United Kingdom) V Lewis	3	1
2	(Australia) L Hoad (United States) M Connolly	6	6
