= 1954 Wimbledon Championships – Men's singles =

Men's singles
- 1954 Wimbledon Championships

Final
- Champion: (Egypt) Jaroslav Drobný
- Runner-up: (Australia) Ken Rosewall
- Score: 13–11, 4–6, 6–2, 9–7

Details
- Draw: 128 (10Q)
- Seeds: 12

Events
| Singles | men | women | | boys | girls |
| Doubles | men | women | mixed | boys | girls |
- Wimbledon Championships

In the 1954 Wimbledon Championships – Gentlemen's Singles competition, Jaroslav Drobný defeated Ken Rosewall in the final, 13–11, 4–6, 6–2, 9–7 to take the gentlemen's singles tennis title. It was Drobný's third singles final and first win at Wimbledon. Vic Seixas was the defending champion, but lost in the quarterfinals to Budge Patty.

It was the first of 19-year-old Rosewall's Wimbledon singles finals, all of which he lost. This resulted in Rosewall being considered by many to be the greatest player never to win Wimbledon.

== Progress of the competition ==
Jaroslav Drobný, who was 32 at the time of the competition, was Czech-born but was said to play "like an Englishman". Drobný was extremely popular with British tennis fans, and no British player had made it to the 1954 quarterfinals, the longest-surviving home player in the men's singles being 18-year-old Mike Davies, who was knocked out in the fourth round by Budge Patty. The Daily Herald reported that nearly everyone wanted to see Drobný win the title. No unseeded players made it to the quarterfinals, the stage at which second-seeded Lew Hoad was knocked out in straight sets by Drobný. Top seed Tony Trabert was defeated in the semifinal by Rosewall.

== Seeds ==
1. (United States) Tony Trabert (semifinals)
2. (Australia) Lew Hoad (quarterfinals)
3. (Australia) Ken Rosewall (final)
4. (United States) Vic Seixas (quarterfinals)
5. (Australia) Mervyn Rose (quarterfinals)
6. (United States) Art Larsen (third round)
7. (United States) Budge Patty (semifinals)
8. (Australia) Rex Hartwig (quarterfinals)
9. (Sweden) Sven Davidson (fourth round)
10. (Denmark) Kurt Nielsen (fourth round)
11. (Egypt) Jaroslav Drobný (champion)
12. (United States) Gardnar Mulloy (fourth round)

Click on the seed number of a player to go to their draw section.

== Draw ==
Key

- Q = Qualifier
- WC = Wild card
- LL = Lucky loser
- Alt = Alternate
- ITF = ITF entry
- PR = Protected ranking
- SR = Special ranking
- SE = Special exempt
- JE = Junior exempt
- JR = Junior Accelerator Programme entrant
- CO = College Accelerator Programme entrant
- NG = Next Gen Accelerator Program entrant
- w/o = Walkover
- r = Retired
- d = Defaulted

=== Finals ===
Quarterfinals
2 | (Australia) Lew Hoad | 4 | 3 | 3
11 | (Egypt) Jaroslav Drobný | 6 | 6 | 6
4 | (United States) Vic Seixas | 5 | 6 | 3 | 2
7 | (United States) Budge Patty | 7 | 4 | 6 | 6
8 | (Australia) Rex Hartwig | 3 | 6 | 6 | 3 | 1
3 | (Australia) Ken Rosewall | 6 | 3 | 3 | 6 | 6
5 | (Australia) Mervyn Rose | 2 | 2 | 5
1 | (United States) Tony Trabert | 6 | 6 | 7

Semifinals
11 | (Egypt) Jaroslav Drobný | 6 | 6 | 4 | 9
7 | (United States) Budge Patty | 2 | 4 | 6 | 7
3 | (Australia) Ken Rosewall | 3 | 6 | 4 | 6 | 6
1 | (United States) Tony Trabert | 6 | 3 | 6 | 1 | 1

Final
11 | (Egypt) Jaroslav Drobný | 13 | 4 | 6 | 9
3 | (Australia) Ken Rosewall | 11 | 6 | 2 | 7

=== Top half ===
==== Section 1 ====
First round
2 | (Australia) Lew Hoad | 6 | 6 | 7
(Italy) Giorgio Fachini | 3 | 2 | 5
Q | (United States) Wayne Van Voorhees | 2 | 7 | 6
(Poland) Ignacy Tłoczyński | 6 | 9 | 8
(Canada) Robert Bédard | 6 | 7 | 6 | 6
Q | (South Africa) Gordon Forbes | 3 | 9 | 1 | 3
(Republic of Ireland) Cyril Kemp | 3 | 1 | 3
(Uruguay) Eduardo Argon | 6 | 6 | 6
12 | (United States) Gardnar Mulloy | 6 | 6 | 7
(United Kingdom) Tim Lewis | 4 | 0 | 5
(United Kingdom) Bernard Crouch
(Socialist Federal Republic of Yugoslavia) Sima Nikolić | w/o
(United Kingdom) Ivor Warwick | 8 | 6 | 2 | 6
(France) Alain Lemyze | 6 | 3 | 6 | 1
(Australia) Peter Molloy | 4 | 6 | 6 | 6
(Socialist Federal Republic of Yugoslavia) Ilija Panajotović | 6 | 1 | 1 | 2

Second round
2 | (Australia) L Hoad | 6 | 6 | 6
(Poland) I Tłoczyński | 0 | 3 | 1
(Canada) R Bédard | 6 | 6 | 6
(Uruguay) E Argon | 2 | 4 | 3
12 | (United States) G Mulloy | 6 | 6 | 6
(United Kingdom) B Crouch | 2 | 4 | 1
(United Kingdom) I Warwick | 4 | 6 | 5 | 4
(Australia) P Molloy | 6 | 0 | 7 | 6

Third round
2 | (Australia) L Hoad | 6 | 6 | 1 | 6
(Canada) R Bédard | 3 | 0 | 6 | 1
12 | (United States) G Mulloy | 6 | 10 | 8
(Australia) P Molloy | 4 | 8 | 6

Fourth round
2 | (Australia) L Hoad | 4 | 6 | 7 | 6
12 | (United States) G Mulloy | 6 | 0 | 5 | 3

==== Section 2 ====
First round
6 | (United States) Art Larsen | 6 | 6 | 10
(United Kingdom) Clive Bernstein | 2 | 4 | 8
(India) Narendra Nath | 4 | 3 | 6 | 6 | 6
(Australia) Bob Howe | 6 | 6 | 3 | 4 | 2
(France) Jean-Claude Molinari | 3 | 6 | 6 | 8 | 0
(Hong Kong) Ip Koon Hung | 6 | 1 | 4 | 10 | 6
(Norway) Finn Søhol | 1 | 2 | 3
(Belgium) Philippe Washer | 6 | 6 | 6
11 | (Egypt) Jaroslav Drobný | 6 | 6 | 6
(Australia) Jack Arkinstall | 3 | 3 | 3
(United Kingdom) Billy Knight | 6 | 4 | 6 | 2 | 1
(Denmark) Torben Ulrich | 2 | 6 | 3 | 6 | 6
(Austria) Franz Saiko | 3 | 1 | 6 | 1
(Poland) Czesław Spychała | 6 | 6 | 3 | 6
(Sweden) Lennart Bergelin | 6 | 6 | 6
(Brazil) Pedro Guimarães | 1 | 2 | 1

Second round
6 | (United States) A Larsen | 7 | 6 | 6
(India) N Nath | 5 | 3 | 3
(Hong Kong) K-H Ip | 7 | 2 | 7 | 1
(Belgium) P Washer | 9 | 6 | 5 | 6
11 | (Egypt) J Drobný | 6 | 6 | 6
(Denmark) T Ulrich | 2 | 0 | 4
(Poland) C Spychała | 1 | 2 | 2
(Sweden) L Bergelin | 6 | 6 | 6

Third round
6 | (United States) A Larsen | 12 | 5 | 2 | 7
(Belgium) P Washer | 10 | 7 | 6 | 9
11 | (Egypt) J Drobný | 6 | 6 | 6
(Sweden) L Bergelin | 4 | 2 | 2

Fourth round
(Belgium) P Washer | 6 | 8 | 3
11 | (Egypt) J Drobný | 8 | 10 | 6

==== Section 3 ====
First round
4 | (United States) Vic Seixas | 6 | 6 | 6
Q | (United Kingdom) Geoff Cass | 1 | 0 | 1
(Italy) Nicola Pietrangeli | 6 | 9 | 6
(Republic of Ireland) Matthew Murphy | 2 | 7 | 0
(United Kingdom) Laurie Proctor | 3 | 1 | 6 | 3
(Federation of Rhodesia and Nyasaland) Basil Katz | 6 | 6 | 4 | 6
(New Zealand) Mark Otway | 6 | 6 | 6
(France) Christian Grandet | 1 | 4 | 2
(Belgium) Jacques Brichant | 6 | 6 | 12
(United States) Julius Heldman | 1 | 4 | 10
(United Kingdom) Geoffrey Paish | 6 | 8 | 6
Q | (United Kingdom) Robin Kipping | 2 | 6 | 2
(Brazil) Arnaldo Moreira | 1 | 1 | 4
(Sweden) Staffan Stockenberg | 6 | 6 | 6
(South Africa) David Samaai | 6 | 6 | 6
(West Germany) Rupert Huber | 2 | 1 | 2

Second round
4 | (United States) V Seixas | 6 | 6 | 6
(Italy) N Pietrangeli | 3 | 4 | 1
(Federation of Rhodesia and Nyasaland) B Katz | 6 | 9 | 1 | 1 | 4
(New Zealand) M Otway | 3 | 7 | 6 | 6 | 6
(Belgium) J Brichant | 6 | 6 | 6
(United Kingdom) G Paish | 1 | 3 | 2
(Sweden) S Stockenberg | 7 | 9 | 3 | 6
(South Africa) D Samaai | 5 | 7 | 6 | 3

Third round
4 | (United States) V Seixas | 6 | 6 | 9
(New Zealand) M Otway | 3 | 4 | 7
(Belgium) J Brichant | 7 | 6 | 6
(Sweden) S Stockenberg | 5 | 1 | 1

Fourth round
4 | (United States) V Seixas | 6 | 7 | 6 | 5 | 6
(Belgium) J Brichant | 8 | 5 | 2 | 7 | 2

==== Section 4 ====
First round
7 | (United States) Budge Patty | 6 | 6 | 6
(United Kingdom) Basil Bucknell | 1 | 0 | 0
(United States) Hugh Stewart | 6 | 6 | 6
(South Africa) Leon Norgarb | 4 | 3 | 1
(Australia) Bruce Robinson | 0 | 0 | 3
(India) Naresh Kumar | 6 | 6 | 6
(Socialist Federal Republic of Yugoslavia) Josip Palada | 6 | 4 | 6 | 4 | 6
(United Kingdom) Tony Pickard | 4 | 6 | 2 | 6 | 1
(United Kingdom) Eric Bulmer | 4 | 2 | 1
(United Kingdom) Mike Davies | 6 | 6 | 6
Q | (United Kingdom) John Ward | 6 | 6 | 6
(United Kingdom) Claude Lister | 0 | 4 | 3
(Switzerland) Erwin Balestra | 0 | 1 | 3
(United Kingdom) Roger Becker | 6 | 6 | 6
(France) Francis Nys | 6 | 6 | 6
Q | (United Kingdom) Philip Wooldridge | 2 | 0 | 2

Second round
7 | (United States) J Patty | 10 | 4 | 6 | 6
(United States) H Stewart | 8 | 6 | 3 | 4
(India) N Kumar | 6 | 6 | 6
(Socialist Federal Republic of Yugoslavia) J Palada | 4 | 4 | 0
(United Kingdom) M Davies | 4 | 7 | 10 | 6
Q | (United Kingdom) J Ward | 6 | 5 | 8 | 1
(United Kingdom) R Becker | 6 | 6 | 6
(France) F Nys | 3 | 0 | 2

Third round
7 | (United States) J Patty | 6 | 6 | 6
(India) N Kumar | 1 | 3 | 4
(United Kingdom) M Davies | 4 | 6 | 6 | 6
(United Kingdom) R Becker | 6 | 4 | 1 | 3

Fourth round
7 | (United States) J Patty | 7 | 6 | 7
(United Kingdom) M Davies | 5 | 1 | 5

=== Bottom half ===
==== Section 5 ====
First round
(United Kingdom) Colin Hannam | 1 | 3 | 6
(United States) Gilbert Shea | 6 | 6 | 8
(Italy) Orlando Sirola | 4 | 7 | 9 | 4
(United Kingdom) Gerry Oakley | 6 | 9 | 7 | 6
(United Kingdom) Henry Billington | 2 | 3 | 2
(Canada) Lorne Main | 6 | 6 | 6
(New Zealand) Jeff Robson | 3 | 6 | 6 | 3 | 4
(Chile) Andrés Hammersley | 6 | 4 | 2 | 6 | 6
(United Kingdom) Howard Walton | 6 | 6 | 0 | 3 | 3
(United States) John Ager | 4 | 3 | 6 | 6 | 6
(United Kingdom) Geoff Ward | 4 | 6 | 4
(United States) Hal Burrows | 6 | 8 | 6
(Iran) Matthew Mohtadi | 3 | 3 | 4
(Hong Kong) Edwin Tsai | 6 | 6 | 6
(Austria) Hans Redl | 0 | 1 | 3
8 | (Australia) Rex Hartwig | 6 | 6 | 6

Second round
(United States) G Shea | 4 | 4 | 6 | 6 | 6
(United Kingdom) G Oakley | 6 | 6 | 1 | 4 | 4
(Canada) L Main | 6 | 6 | 7 | 7
(Chile) A Hammersley | 1 | 3 | 9 | 5
(United States) J Ager | 4 | 6 | 2 | 3
(United States) H Burrows | 6 | 3 | 6 | 6
(Hong Kong) E Tsai | 1 | 5 | 3
8 | (Australia) R Hartwig | 6 | 7 | 6

Third round
(United States) G Shea | 6 | 7 | 5 | 1 | 6
(Canada) L Main | 1 | 5 | 7 | 6 | 1
(United States) H Burrows | 3 | 4 | 3
8 | (Australia) R Hartwig | 6 | 6 | 6

Fourth round
(United States) G Shea | 4 | 6 | 1 | 4
8 | (Australia) R Hartwig | 6 | 1 | 6 | 6

==== Section 6 ====
First round
(Australia) Ashley Cooper | 6 | 6 | 6
(Socialist Federal Republic of Yugoslavia) Ivko Plećević | 0 | 2 | 4
(Australia) Roy Emerson | 6 | 6 | 8
(United States) Malcolm Fox | 1 | 3 | 6
(United States) Tony Vincent | 6 | 6 | 3 | 6
(Belgium) Ivan Devroe | 2 | 4 | 6 | 3
(United Kingdom) Norman Kitovitz | 6 | 6 | 6
Q | (United Kingdom) Martin Hime | 2 | 2 | 3
(United Kingdom) Ralph Oliver | 0 | 2 | 2
(France) Paul Rémy | 6 | 6 | 6
(West Germany) Beppo Pottinger | 4 | 4 | 1
(Brazil) Bob Falkenburg | 6 | 6 | 6
(United States) Herbie Flam | 6 | 6 | 8
(United Kingdom) Darrell Shaw | 4 | 3 | 6
(South Africa) Abe Segal | 5 | 6 | 6 | 6
3 | (Australia) Ken Rosewall | 7 | 4 | 8 | 8

Second round
(Australia) A Cooper | 6 | 6 | 6
(Australia) R Emerson | 1 | 1 | 3
(United States) A Vincent | 6 | 6 | 6
(United Kingdom) N Kitovitz | 4 | 2 | 3
(France) P Rémy | 4 | 4 | 6
(Brazil) R Falkenburg | 6 | 6 | 8
(United States) H Flam | 2 | 6 | 4
3 | (Australia) K Rosewall | 6 | 8 | 6

Third round
(Australia) A Cooper | 6 | 7 | 11
(United States) A Vincent | 3 | 5 | 9
(Brazil) R Falkenburg | 2 | 6 | 1 | 4
3 | (Australia) K Rosewall | 6 | 4 | 6 | 6

Fourth round
(Australia) A Cooper | 2 | 3 | 6 | 8
3 | (Australia) K Rosewall | 6 | 6 | 4 | 10

==== Section 7 ====
First round
(Spain) Jaime Bartrolí | 0 | 2 | 4
(Australia) Dawson Hamilton | 6 | 6 | 6
(Australia) Doug Reid | 0 | 2 | 7
(United Kingdom) John Barrett | 6 | 6 | 9
(United States) Andy Paton | 8 | 7 | 6 | 4 | 6
Q | (United Kingdom) Peter Moys | 6 | 9 | 3 | 6 | 3
(Netherlands) Fred Dehnert | 3 | 4 | 4
10 | (Denmark) Kurt Nielsen | 6 | 6 | 6
(United Kingdom) Don Butler | 1 | 6 | 6 | 3
(Dominion of Ceylon) Doug Scharenguivel | 6 | 8 | 3 | 6
(India) Ramanathan Krishnan | 6 | 6 | 6
(United States) Gene Garrett | 3 | 3 | 2
(United Kingdom) Bob Lee | 2 | 3 | 3
(Australia) Neale Fraser | 6 | 6 | 6
(United Kingdom) Tony Mottram | 1 | 2 | 3
5 | (Australia) Mervyn Rose | 6 | 6 | 6

Second round
(Australia) D Hamilton | 6 | 2 | 4 | 6 | 1
(United Kingdom) J Barrett | 4 | 6 | 6 | 4 | 6
(United States) A Paton | 3 | 10 | 6 | 6 | 4
10 | (Denmark) K Nielsen | 6 | 12 | 4 | 4 | 6
(Dominion of Ceylon) D Scharenguivel | 2 | 3 | 2
(India) R Krishnan | 6 | 6 | 6
(Australia) N Fraser | 6 | 3 | 1
5 | (Australia) M Rose | 8 | 6 | 6

Third round
(United Kingdom) J Barrett | 6 | 3 | 4 | 4
10 | (Denmark) K Nielsen | 4 | 6 | 6 | 6
(India) R Krishnan | 3 | 1 | 3
5 | (Australia) M Rose | 6 | 6 | 6

Fourth round
10 | (Denmark) K Nielsen | 6 | 3 | 7 | 4
5 | (Australia) M Rose | 4 | 6 | 9 | 6

==== Section 8 ====
First round
(Republic of Ireland) Robin Condy | 6 | 4 | 6 | 4 | 4
Q | (Australia) Geoff Pryor | 3 | 6 | 1 | 6 | 6
(Republic of Ireland) Guy Jackson | 4 | 4 | 10 | 6 | 5
(France) Jean-Noël Grinda | 6 | 6 | 8 | 3 | 7
(Federation of Rhodesia and Nyasaland) Don Black | 3 | 6 | 3 | 0^{r}
(Belgium) Jacques Peten | 6 | 2 | 6 | 0
(Trinidad and Tobago) Ian McDonald | 2 | 5 | 3
9 | (Sweden) Sven Davidson | 6 | 7 | 6
(Brazil) Armando Vieira | 7 | 3 | 6 | 6
(New Zealand) John Barry | 5 | 6 | 4 | 1
(United Kingdom) Bobby Wilson | 6 | 6 | 6
(Socialist Federal Republic of Yugoslavia) Vladimir Petrović | 4 | 3 | 1
(France) Philippe Chatrier | 4 | 0 | 3
(South Africa) Owen Williams | 6 | 6 | 6
Q | (United Kingdom) Peter Wooller | 0 | 2 | 2
1 | (United States) Tony Trabert | 6 | 6 | 6

Second round
Q | (Australia) G Pryor | 6 | 5 | 4 | 6
(France) J-N Grinda | 0 | 7 | 6 | 8
(Belgium) J Peten | 4 | 1 | 2
9 | (Sweden) S Davidson | 6 | 6 | 6
(Brazil) A Vieira | 5 | 3 | 3
(United Kingdom) R Wilson | 7 | 6 | 6
(South Africa) O Williams | 5 | 2 | 5
1 | (United States) A Trabert | 7 | 6 | 7

Third round
(France) J-N Grinda | 1 | 2 | 4
9 | (Sweden) S Davidson | 6 | 6 | 6
(United Kingdom) R Wilson | 8 | 6 | 2
1 | (United States) A Trabert | 10 | 8 | 6

Fourth round
9 | (Sweden) S Davidson | 6 | 10 | 0 | 9 | 3
1 | (United States) A Trabert | 3 | 12 | 6 | 7 | 6

| Preceded by 1954 French Championships | Grand Slams; Men's Singles | Succeeded by 1954 U.S. Championships |
