= 1957 Pacific Southwest Championships =

- Date: September 13–22
- Edition: 31st
- Category: Amateur
- Surface: Hard / outdoor
- Location: Los Angeles, California, U.S.
- Venue: Los Angeles Tennis Club

Champions

Men's singles
- (United States) Vic Seixas

Women's singles
- (United States) Althea Gibson

Men's doubles
- (Australia) Ashley Cooper / (Australia) Neale Fraser

Women's doubles
- (United States) Althea Gibson / (United States) Darlene Hard

Mixed doubles
- (Australia) Mary Bevis Hawton / (Australia) Robert Howe
← 1956 ·	Pacific Southwest Open	· 1958 →

The 1957 Pacific Southwest Championships was a combined men's and women's amateur tennis tournament played on outdoor hard courts at the Los Angeles Tennis Club in Los Angeles, California in the United States. It was the 31st edition of the tournament and took place from September 13 through September 22, 1957. Vic Seixas and Althea Gibson won the singles titles.

== Finals ==
=== Men's singles ===
(United States) Vic Seixas defeated (United States) Gilbert Shea 9–7, 6–3, 6–4

=== Women's singles ===
(United States) Althea Gibson defeated (United States) Louise Brough 6–3, 6–1

=== Men's doubles ===
(Australia) Ashley Cooper / (Australia) Neale Fraser defeated (United States) Budge Patty / (United States) Vic Seixas 3–6, 5–7, 13–11, 13–11, 6–3

=== Women's doubles ===
(United States) Althea Gibson / (United States) Darlene Hard defeated (Australia) Mary Bevis Hawton / (United States) Janet Hopps 6–2, 6–4

=== Mixed doubles ===
(Australia) Mary Bevis Hawton / (Australia) Robert Howe defeated (United States) Darlene Hard / (United Kingdom) Mike Davies 6–3, 6–4
