= 2025 US Open – Men's singles =

Tennis championship

Men's singles
- 2025 US Open

Final
- Champion: (Spain) Carlos Alcaraz
- Runner-up: (Italy) Jannik Sinner
- Score: 6–2, 3–6, 6–1, 6–4
- Date: September 7, 2025

Details
- Draw: 128 (16Q / 8WC)
- Seeds: 32

Events
Singles	men	women		boys	girls
Doubles	men	women	mixed	boys	girls
WC Singles	men	women	quad	boys	girls
WC Doubles	men	women	quad	boys	girls

Qualification
Singles	men	women
- US Open

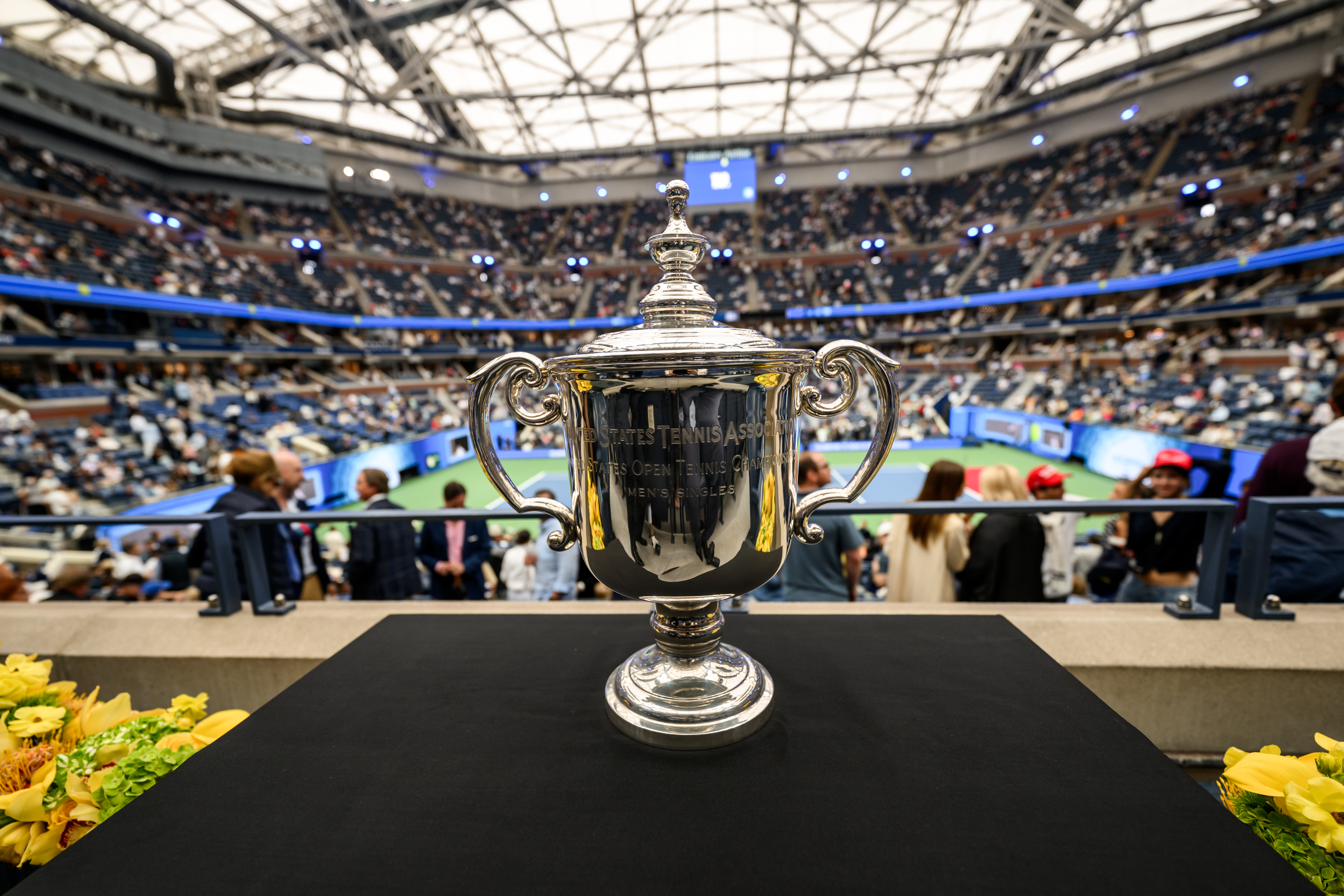
Men's singles trophy

Carlos Alcaraz defeated defending champion Jannik Sinner in the final, 6–2, 3–6, 6–1, 6–4 to win the men's singles tennis title at the 2025 US Open. It was his second US Open title and sixth major title overall. By winning the title, Alcaraz regained the world No. 1 singles ranking from Sinner. Alcaraz was the youngest man to win a sixth major title since Björn Borg. Alcaraz also became the youngest man to win multiple majors on all 3 surfaces, at just 22 years, 125 days old, surpassing Mats Wilander’s previous record of 24 years, 20 days old. Sinner was the fourth (and youngest) man in the Open Era to reach all four major finals in a season (after Rod Laver, Roger Federer, and Novak Djokovic), and the youngest in the Open Era to reach five consecutive major finals. Alcaraz and Sinner became the first pair of men's singles players in the Open Era to contest three major finals in the same year. For the first time since the introduction of the current ATP rankings in 1973, the world No. 1 and No. 2 contested all four major finals in a season.

At 38 years, 103 days of age, Djokovic was the oldest man to reach all four major semifinals in a season. With his third-round win, Djokovic recorded his 192nd career match win at hardcourt majors, surpassing Federer's record. With his semifinal loss to Alcaraz, this marked only the third year since 2007 where Djokovic did not contest a major final (after 2009 and 2017), and the first year since 2002 that none of Big Three contested a major final. This also marked the first time since 2010 that Grigor Dimitrov did not participate at a major, ending his streak of 58 consecutive major appearances.

Coleman Wong became the first player from Hong Kong to qualify for a men's singles major in the Open Era, and was the first to win a major singles match since Ip Koon Hung and Edwin Tsai at the 1954 Wimbledon Championships—when Hong Kong was a British colony. A record-equaling five qualifiers (Wong, Leandro Riedi, Jan-Lennard Struff, Ugo Blanchet, and Jérôme Kym) reached the third round, tying the tournament's Open Era record along with 1984 and 2021. Ranked No. 435, Riedi was the lowest-ranked player to reach the fourth round of a major since Richard Krajicek at the 2002 Wimbledon Championships.

== Seeds ==
1. (Italy) Jannik Sinner (final)
2. (Spain) Carlos Alcaraz (champion)
3. (Germany) Alexander Zverev (third round)
4. (United States) Taylor Fritz (quarterfinals)
5. (United Kingdom) Jack Draper (second round, withdrew)
6. (United States) Ben Shelton (third round, retired)
7. (Serbia) Novak Djokovic (semifinals)
8. (Australia) Alex de Minaur (quarterfinals)
9. Karen Khachanov (second round)
10. (Italy) Lorenzo Musetti (quarterfinals)
11. (Denmark) Holger Rune (second round)
12. (Norway) Casper Ruud (second round)
13. Daniil Medvedev (first round)
14. (United States) Tommy Paul (third round)
15. Andrey Rublev (fourth round)
16. (Czech Republic) Jakub Menšík (second round)
17. (United States) Frances Tiafoe (third round)
18. (Spain) Alejandro Davidovich Fokina (second round)
19. (Argentina) Francisco Cerúndolo (second round)
20. (Czech Republic) Jiří Lehečka (quarterfinals)
21. (Czech Republic) Tomáš Macháč (fourth round)
22. (France) Ugo Humbert (first round)
23. (Kazakhstan) Alexander Bublik (fourth round)
24. (Italy) Flavio Cobolli (third round, retired)
25. (Canada) Félix Auger-Aliassime (semifinals)
26. (Greece) Stefanos Tsitsipas (second round)
27. (Canada) Denis Shapovalov (third round)
28. (United States) Alex Michelsen (first round)
29. (Netherlands) Tallon Griekspoor (first round)
30. (United States) Brandon Nakashima (second round)
31. (Canada) Gabriel Diallo (second round)
32. (Italy) Luciano Darderi (third round)

Click on the seed number of a player to go to their draw section.

== Draw ==
Key

- Q = Qualifier
- WC = Wild card
- LL = Lucky loser
- Alt = Alternate
- ITF = ITF entry
- PR = Protected ranking
- SR = Special ranking
- SE = Special exempt
- JE = Junior exempt
- JR = Junior Accelerator Programme entrant
- CO = College Accelerator Programme entrant
- NG = Next Gen Accelerator Program entrant
- w/o = Walkover
- r = Retired
- d = Defaulted

=== Finals ===
Quarterfinals
1	(Italy) Jannik Sinner	6	6	6
10	(Italy) Lorenzo Musetti	1	4	2
25	(Canada) Félix Auger-Aliassime	4	7^{9}	7	7^{7}
8	(Australia) Alex de Minaur	6	6^{7}	5	6^{4}
7	(Serbia) Novak Djokovic	6	7	3	6
4	(United States) Taylor Fritz	3	5	6	4
20	(Czech Republic) Jiří Lehečka	4	2	4
2	(Spain) Carlos Alcaraz	6	6	6

Semifinals
1	(Italy) Jannik Sinner	6	3	6	6
25	(Canada) Félix Auger-Aliassime	1	6	3	4
7	(Serbia) Novak Djokovic	4	6^{4}	2
2	(Spain) Carlos Alcaraz	6	7^{7}	6

Final
1	(Italy) Jannik Sinner	2	6	1	4
2	(Spain) Carlos Alcaraz	6	3	6	6

=== Top half ===
==== Section 1 ====
First round
1	(Italy) J Sinner	6	6	6
(Czech Republic) V Kopřiva	1	1	2
(Australia) A Popyrin	6	6	7^{7}
PR	(Finland) E Ruusuvuori	3	4	6^{3}
WC	(France) V Royer	6	6	7^{7}
(China) Y Bu	1	4	6^{1}
(Hungary) M Fucsovics	4	4	0
27	(Canada) D Shapovalov	6	6	6
23	(Kazakhstan) A Bublik	6	6	6
(Croatia) M Čilić	4	1	4
(Italy) L Sonego	3	6^{8}	6	6	6^{6}
WC	(Australia) T Schoolkate	6	7^{10}	1	1	7^{10}
(Portugal) N Borges	6	6	6
(United States) B Holt	4	2	3
(Denmark) E Møller	3	3	1
14	(United States) T Paul	6	6	6

Second round
1	(Italy) J Sinner	6	6	6
(Australia) A Popyrin	3	2	2
WC	(France) V Royer	6^{6}	6	6^{4}	3
27	(Canada) D Shapovalov	7^{8}	3	7^{7}	6
23	(Kazakhstan) A Bublik	6	6	6
WC	(Australia) T Schoolkate	3	3	3
(Portugal) N Borges	6^{6}	3	7	7	5
14	(United States) T Paul	7^{8}	6	5	5	7

Third round
1	(Italy) J Sinner	5	6	6	6
27	(Canada) D Shapovalov	7	4	3	3
23	(Kazakhstan) A Bublik	7^{7}	6^{4}	6	6^{5}	6
14	(United States) T Paul	6^{5}	7^{7}	3	7^{7}	1

Fourth round
1	(Italy) J Sinner	6	6	6
23	(Kazakhstan) A Bublik	1	1	1

==== Section 2 ====
First round
10	(Italy) L Musetti	6^{3}	6	6	6
(France) G Mpetshi Perricard	7^{7}	3	4	4
(France) Q Halys	7^{7}	4	3	5
(Belgium) D Goffin	6^{2}	6	6	7
(United States) J Brooksby	6	6^{4}	6	3	6
(Australia) A Vukic	3	7^{7}	4	6	4
Q	(Italy) F Passaro	5	6	4	6	3
24	(Italy) F Cobolli	7	4	6	3	6
31	(Canada) G Diallo	7^{7}	4	7	7
(Bosnia and Herzegovina) D Džumhur	6^{4}	6	5	5
(Spain) J Munar	6	6	5	6
LL	(Portugal) J Faria	0	3	7	2
(Belgium) Z Bergs	6	6	6
(Chinese Taipei) C-h Tseng	3	4	3
Q	(Argentina) FA Gómez	4	5	7^{9}	2
5	(United Kingdom) J Draper	6	7	6^{7}	6

Second round
10	(Italy) L Musetti	6	6	6
(Belgium) D Goffin	4	0	2
(United States) J Brooksby	7	3	4	6	6^{3}
24	(Italy) F Cobolli	5	6	6	2	7^{10}
31	(Canada) G Diallo	5	3	5
(Spain) J Munar	7	6	7
(Belgium) Z Bergs	w/o
5	(United Kingdom) J Draper

Third round
10	(Italy) L Musetti	6	6	2
24	(Italy) F Cobolli	3	2	0^{r}
(Spain) J Munar	6	6	6
(Belgium) Z Bergs	1	4	4

Fourth round
10	(Italy) L Musetti	6	6	6
(Spain) J Munar	3	0	1

==== Section 3 ====
First round
3	(Germany) A Zverev	6	7^{7}	6
(Chile) A Tabilo	2	6^{4}	4
(Spain) R Bautista Agut	5	2	7	4
(United Kingdom) J Fearnley	7	6	5	6
(France) G Monfils	4	6	1	6	4
R Safiullin	6	2	6	3	6
LL	(United Kingdom) B Harris	4	6^{8}	4
25	(Canada) F Auger-Aliassime	6	7^{10}	6
22	(France) U Humbert	4	6^{4}	7	1
(Australia) A Walton	6	7^{7}	5	6
(United States) A Kovacevic	4	5	6^{4}
Q	(Hong Kong) C Wong	6	7	7^{7}
LL	(Australia) J Duckworth	3	5	4
WC	(United States) T Boyer	6	7	6
Q	(Croatia) D Prižmić	4	4	4
15	A Rublev	6	6	6

Second round
3	(Germany) A Zverev	6	6	6
(United Kingdom) J Fearnley	4	4	4
R Safiullin	1	6^{4}	6^{5}
25	(Canada) F Auger-Aliassime	6	7^{7}	7^{7}
(Australia) A Walton	6^{5}	2	6	4
Q	(Hong Kong) C Wong	7^{7}	6	4	6
WC	(United States) T Boyer	3	3	7	6^{4}
15	A Rublev	6	6	5	7^{7}

Third round
3	(Germany) A Zverev	6	6^{7}	4	4
25	(Canada) F Auger-Aliassime	4	7^{9}	6	6
Q	(Hong Kong) C Wong	6	4	3	6	3
15	A Rublev	2	6	6	4	6

Fourth round
25	(Canada) F Auger-Aliassime	7	6	6
15	A Rublev	5	3	4

==== Section 4 ====
First round
9	K Khachanov	6^{5}	6	7	6
WC	(United States) N Basavareddy	7^{7}	3	5	1
(Bolivia) H Dellien	1	4	7^{7}	4
(Poland) K Majchrzak	6	6	6^{5}	6
Q	(Switzerland) L Riedi	6	6	6
(Spain) P Martínez	4	2	3
(Italy) M Arnaldi	6	6	5	4	3
19	(Argentina) F Cerúndolo	3	2	7	6	6
26	(Greece) S Tsitsipas	4	6	6	7^{7}
(France) A Müller	6	0	1	6^{5}
(Germany) D Altmaier	7	6^{3}	7^{9}	6^{5}	6
(Serbia) H Medjedovic	5	7^{7}	6^{7}	7^{7}	4
(France) H Gaston	4	3	4
Q	(Japan) S Mochizuki	6	6	6
(Australia) C O'Connell	3	4	4
8	(Australia) A de Minaur	6	6	6

Second round
9	K Khachanov	6	7^{7}	4	5	6^{5}
(Poland) K Majchrzak	2	6^{4}	6	7	7^{10}
Q	(Switzerland) L Riedi	3	4	6	6	6
19	(Argentina) F Cerúndolo	6	6	4	4	2
26	(Greece) S Tsitsipas	6^{5}	6	6	3	5
(Germany) D Altmaier	7^{7}	1	4	6	7
Q	(Japan) S Mochizuki	2	4	2
8	(Australia) A de Minaur	6	6	6

Third round
(Poland) K Majchrzak	3^{r}
Q	(Switzerland) L Riedi	5
(Germany) D Altmaier	7^{9}	3	4	0^{r}
8	(Australia) A de Minaur	6^{7}	6	6	2

Fourth round
Q	(Switzerland) L Riedi	3	2	1
8	(Australia) A de Minaur	6	6	6

=== Bottom half ===
==== Section 5 ====
First round
7	(Serbia) N Djokovic	6	7^{7}	6
(United States) L Tien	1	6^{3}	2
Q	(United States) Z Svajda	6	6	7
Q	(Hungary) Z Piros	4	2	5
(United Kingdom) C Norrie	7	6	0
(United States) S Korda	5	4	0^{r}
(Argentina) F Comesaña	1	6	6	6
28	(United States) A Michelsen	6	3	4	4
17	(United States) F Tiafoe	6	7^{8}	6
(Japan) Y Nishioka	3	6^{6}	3
Q	(United States) M Damm	6	6	6
WC	(United States) D Blanch	3	4	4
Q	(Germany) J-L Struff	3	7^{7}	6	6
(United States) M McDonald	6	6^{4}	3	3
(Netherlands) B van de Zandschulp	3	6^{4}	6^{2}
11	(Denmark) H Rune	6	7^{7}	7^{7}

Second round
7	(Serbia) N Djokovic	6^{5}	6	6	6
Q	(United States) Z Svajda	7^{7}	3	3	1
(United Kingdom) C Norrie	7^{7}	6	6^{0}	7^{7}
(Argentina) F Comesaña	6^{5}	3	7^{7}	6^{4}
17	(United States) F Tiafoe	6	7	6^{8}	7
Q	(United States) M Damm	4	5	7^{10}	5
Q	(Germany) J-L Struff	7^{7}	2	6	4	7
11	(Denmark) H Rune	6^{5}	6	3	6	5

Third round
7	(Serbia) N Djokovic	6	6^{4}	6	6
(United Kingdom) C Norrie	4	7^{7}	2	3
17	(United States) F Tiafoe	4	3	6^{7}
Q	(Germany) J-L Struff	6	6	7^{9}

Fourth round
7	(Serbia) N Djokovic	6	6	6
Q	(Germany) J-L Struff	3	3	2

==== Section 6 ====
First round
16	(Czech Republic) J Menšík	7^{7}	6	6
(Chile) N Jarry	6^{5}	3	4
Q	(France) U Blanchet	6	3	7^{9}	6
(Hungary) F Marozsán	4	6	6^{7}	2
(Brazil) J Fonseca	7^{7}	7^{7}	6
(Serbia) M Kecmanović	6^{3}	6^{5}	3
(Italy) L Nardi	3	1	1
21	(Czech Republic) T Macháč	6	6	6
30	(United States) B Nakashima	6	6^{5}	2	6	7^{10}
Q	(Netherlands) J de Jong	2	7^{7}	6	2	6^{7}
Q	(Switzerland) J Kym	6	6	3	7^{7}
(United States) E Quinn	3	2	6	6^{5}
(Argentina) S Báez	3	5	4
Q	(South Africa) L Harris	6	7	6
WC	(United States) E Nava	5	2	3
4	(United States) T Fritz	7	6	6

Second round
16	(Czech Republic) J Menšík	7^{7}	6^{5}	6	4	6^{7}
Q	(France) U Blanchet	6^{2}	7^{7}	3	6	7^{10}
(Brazil) J Fonseca	6^{4}	2	3
21	(Czech Republic) T Macháč	7^{7}	6	6
30	(United States) B Nakashima	6	6^{2}	5	6	6^{8}
Q	(Switzerland) J Kym	4	7^{7}	7	3	7^{10}
Q	(South Africa) L Harris	6	6^{3}	2	4
4	(United States) T Fritz	4	7^{7}	6	6

Third round
Q	(France) U Blanchet	5	3	1
21	(Czech Republic) T Macháč	7	6	6
Q	(Switzerland) J Kym	6^{3}	7^{11}	4	4
4	(United States) T Fritz	7^{7}	6^{9}	6	6

Fourth round
21	(Czech Republic) T Macháč	4	3	3
4	(United States) T Fritz	6	6	6

==== Section 7 ====
First round
6	(United States) B Shelton	6	6	6
Q	(Peru) I Buse	3	2	4
(Spain) P Carreño Busta	7^{9}	6	6
Q	(Spain) P Llamas Ruiz	6^{7}	4	2
(Australia) J Thompson	6	6	1	6
(France) C Moutet	2	4	6	3
(France) A Mannarino	7	6	6
29	(Netherlands) T Griekspoor	5	4	0
20	(Czech Republic) J Lehečka	3	6	7^{7}	6
(Croatia) B Ćorić	6	4	6^{5}	1
(Argentina) C Ugo Carabelli	3	2	0
(Argentina) TM Etcheverry	6	6	6
LL	(Colombia) DE Galán	4	4	4
(Belgium) R Collignon	6	6	6
PR	(Austria) S Ofner	1	2	6^{5}
12	(Norway) C Ruud	6	6	7^{7}

Second round
6	(United States) B Shelton	6	6	6
(Spain) P Carreño Busta	4	2	4
(Australia) J Thompson	4	7^{7}	3	3
(France) A Mannarino	6	6^{5}	6	6
20	(Czech Republic) J Lehečka	3	6	6	6
(Argentina) TM Etcheverry	6	0	2	4
(Belgium) R Collignon	6	3	3	6	7
12	(Norway) C Ruud	4	6	6	4	5

Third round
6	(United States) B Shelton	6	3	6	4	0^{r}
(France) A Mannarino	3	6	4	6	0
20	(Czech Republic) J Lehečka	6	6	6
(Belgium) R Collignon	4	4	4

Fourth round
(France) A Mannarino	6^{4}	4	6	2
20	(Czech Republic) J Lehečka	7^{7}	6	2	6

==== Section 8 ====
First round
13	D Medvedev	3	5	7^{7}	6	4
(France) B Bonzi	6	7	6^{5}	0	6
(Argentina) M Navone	0	5	6	7	4
(United States) M Giron	6	7	4	5	6
(Spain) R Carballés Baena	6^{2}	5	6	2
(France) A Rinderknech	7^{7}	7	4	6
(Kazakhstan) A Shevchenko	1	1	2
18	(Spain) A Davidovich Fokina	6	6	6
32	(Italy) L Darderi	6	6	6
(Australia) R Hijikata	2	1	2
WC	(United States) S Dostanic	5	4	6^{4}
WC	(United States) E Spizzirri	7	6	7^{7}
(Italy) M Bellucci	7^{7}	1	6	3
(China) J Shang	6^{0}	6	3	0^{r}
(United States) R Opelka	4	5	4
2	(Spain) C Alcaraz	6	7	6

Second round
(France) B Bonzi	2	4	7	6	6
(United States) M Giron	6	6	5	3	4
(France) A Rinderknech	6	3	2	6	6
18	(Spain) A Davidovich Fokina	4	6	6	2	3
32	(Italy) L Darderi	6	7^{7}	2	6
WC	(United States) E Spizzirri	0	6^{3}	6	4
(Italy) M Bellucci	1	0	3
2	(Spain) C Alcaraz	6	6	6

Third round
(France) B Bonzi	6	3	3	2
(France) A Rinderknech	4	6	6	6
32	(Italy) L Darderi	2	4	0
2	(Spain) C Alcaraz	6	6	6

Fourth round
(France) A Rinderknech	6^{3}	3	4
2	(Spain) C Alcaraz	7^{7}	6	6

== Seeded players ==
The following are the seeded players. Seedings are based on ATP rankings as of August 18, 2025. Rankings and points before are as of August 25, 2025.

Seed	Rank	Player	Points before	Points defending	Points won	Points after	Status
1	1	(Italy) Jannik Sinner	11,480	2,000	1,300	10,780	Runner-up, lost to (Spain) Carlos Alcaraz [2]
2	2	(Spain) Carlos Alcaraz	9,590	50	2,000	11,540	Champion, defeated (Italy) Jannik Sinner [1]
3	3	(Germany) Alexander Zverev	6,230	400	100	5,930	Third round lost to (Canada) Félix Auger-Aliassime [25]
4	4	(United States) Taylor Fritz	5,575	1,300	400	4,675	Quarterfinals lost to (Serbia) Novak Djokovic [7]
5	5	(United Kingdom) Jack Draper	4,440	800	50	3,690	Second round withdrew due to left arm injury
6	6	(United States) Ben Shelton	4,280	100	100	4,280	Third round retired against (France) Adrian Mannarino
7	7	(Serbia) Novak Djokovic	4,130	100	800	4,830	Semifinals lost to (Spain) Carlos Alcaraz [2]
8	8	(Australia) Alex de Minaur	3,545	400	400	3,545	Quarterfinals lost to (Canada) Félix Auger-Aliassime [25]
9	9	Karen Khachanov	3,240	10	50	3,280	Second round lost to (Poland) Kamil Majchrzak
10	10	(Italy) Lorenzo Musetti	3,205	100	400	3,505	Quarterfinals lost to (Italy) Jannik Sinner [1]
11	11	(Denmark) Holger Rune	3,050	10	50	3,090	Second round lost to (Germany) Jan-Lennard Struff [Q]
12	12	(Norway) Casper Ruud	2,905	200	50	2,755	Second round lost to (Belgium) Raphaël Collignon
13	13	Daniil Medvedev	2,760	400	10	2,370	First round lost to (France) Benjamin Bonzi
14	14	(United States) Tommy Paul	2,610	200	100	2,510	Third round lost to (Kazakhstan) Alexander Bublik [23]
15	15	Andrey Rublev	2,610	200	200	2,610	Fourth round lost to (Canada) Félix Auger-Aliassime [25]
16	16	(Czech Republic) Jakub Menšík	2,430	100	50	2,380	Second round lost to (France) Ugo Blanchet [Q]
17	17	(United States) Frances Tiafoe	2,340	800	100	1,640	Third round lost to (Germany) Jan-Lennard Struff [Q]
18	18	(Spain) Alejandro Davidovich Fokina	2,185	10	50	2,225	Second round lost to (France) Arthur Rinderknech
19	19	(Argentina) Francisco Cerúndolo	2,135	50	50	2,135	Second round lost to (Switzerland) Leandro Riedi [Q]
20	21	(Czech Republic) Jiří Lehečka	2,115	100	400	2,415	Quarterfinals lost to (Spain) Carlos Alcaraz [2]
21	22	(Czech Republic) Tomáš Macháč	2,110	200	200	2,110	Fourth round lost to (United States) Taylor Fritz [4]
22	23	(France) Ugo Humbert	2,085	50	10	2,045	First round lost to (Australia) Adam Walton
23	24	(Kazakhstan) Alexander Bublik	2,055	10	200	2,245	Fourth round lost to (Italy) Jannik Sinner [1]
24	26	(Italy) Flavio Cobolli	2,040	100	100	2,040	Third round retired against (Italy) Lorenzo Musetti [10]
25	27	(Canada) Félix Auger-Aliassime	1,965	10	800	2,755	Semifinals lost to (Italy) Jannik Sinner [1]
26	28	(Greece) Stefanos Tsitsipas	1,790	10	50	1,830	Second round lost to (Germany) Daniel Altmaier
27	29	(Canada) Denis Shapovalov	1,748	10	100	1,838	Third round lost to (Italy) Jannik Sinner [1]
28	32	(United States) Alex Michelsen	1,525	50	10	1,485	First round lost to (Argentina) Francisco Comesaña
29	30	(Netherlands) Tallon Griekspoor	1,655	100	10	1,565	First round lost to (France) Adrian Mannarino
30	31	(United States) Brandon Nakashima	1,570	200	50	1,420	Second round lost to (Switzerland) Jérôme Kym [Q]
31	33	(Canada) Gabriel Diallo	1,388	130	50	1,308	Second round lost to (Spain) Jaume Munar
32	34	(Italy) Luciano Darderi	1,379	10	100	1,469	Third round lost to (Spain) Carlos Alcaraz [2]

=== Withdrawn seeded players ===
The following players would have been seeded, but withdrew before the tournament began.

Rank	Player	Points before	Points defending	Points after	Withdrawal reason
20	(France) Arthur Fils	2,120	50	2,070	Back injury
25	(Bulgaria) Grigor Dimitrov	2,045	400	1,645	Pectoral injury

== Other entry information ==
=== Wildcards ===
- (United States) Nishesh Basavareddy
- (United States) Darwin Blanch
- (United States) Tristan Boyer
- (United States) Stefan Dostanic
- (United States) Emilio Nava
- (France) Valentin Royer
- (Australia) Tristan Schoolkate
- (United States) Eliot Spizzirri

=== Protected ranking ===
- (Austria) Sebastian Ofner (74)
- (Finland) Emil Ruusuvuori (83)

=== Qualifiers ===
- (France) Ugo Blanchet
- (Peru) Ignacio Buse
- (United States) Martin Damm
- (Netherlands) Jesper de Jong
- (Argentina) Federico Agustín Gómez
- (South Africa) Lloyd Harris
- (Switzerland) Jérôme Kym
- (Spain) Pablo Llamas Ruiz
- (Japan) Shintaro Mochizuki
- (Italy) Francesco Passaro
- (Hungary) Zsombor Piros
- (Croatia) Dino Prižmić
- (Switzerland) Leandro Riedi
- (Germany) Jan-Lennard Struff
- (United States) Zachary Svajda
- (Hong Kong) Coleman Wong

=== Lucky losers ===
- (Australia) James Duckworth
- (Portugal) Jaime Faria
- (Colombia) Daniel Elahi Galán
- (United Kingdom) Billy Harris

=== Withdrawals ===
The entry list was released based on the ATP rankings for the week of July 14, 2025.

- ‡ (Poland) Hubert Hurkacz (41) → replaced by (Denmark) Elmer Møller (102)
- ‡ (Bulgaria) Grigor Dimitrov (21) → replaced by (Chile) Alejandro Tabilo (103)
- ‡ (Italy) Matteo Berrettini (36) → replaced by (United States) Brandon Holt (104)
- † (France) Arthur Fils (15) → replaced by (Australia) James Duckworth (LL)
- † (Japan) Kei Nishikori (71) → replaced by (Portugal) Jaime Faria (LL)
- † (Australia) Nick Kyrgios (21 PR) → replaced by (United Kingdom) Billy Harris (LL)
- § (Serbia) Laslo Djere (60) → replaced by (Colombia) Daniel Elahi Galán (LL)

‡ – withdrew from entry list before qualifying began
† – withdrew from entry list after qualifying began
§ – withdrew from main draw

Source: USTA

Preceded by 2025 Wimbledon Championships – Men's singles	Grand Slam men's singles	Succeeded by 2026 Australian Open – Men's singles
