= 1954 Australian Championships – Men's singles =

Men's singles
- 1954 Australian Championships

Final
- Champion: (Australia) Mervyn Rose
- Runner-up: (Australia) Rex Hartwig
- Score: 6–2, 0–6, 6–4, 6–2

Details
- Draw: 32
- Seeds: 16

Events
Singles	men	women
Doubles	men	women
- Australian Championships

Mervyn Rose defeated Rex Hartwig 6–2, 0–6, 6–4, 6–2 in the final to win the men's singles tennis title at the 1954 Australian Championships.

Ken Rosewall was the defending champion and the first-seed but lost in a five-set semifinal to fifth-seeded and eventual champion Mervyn Rose.

== Seeds ==
The seeded players are listed below. Mervyn Rose is the champion; others show the round in which they were eliminated.

1. (Australia) Ken Rosewall (semifinals)
2. (United States) Tony Trabert (second round)
3. (Australia) Rex Hartwig (finalist)
4. (United States) Vic Seixas (quarterfinals)
5. (Australia) Mervyn Rose (champion)
6. (United States) Ham Richardson (quarterfinals)
7. (Australia) George Worthington (quarterfinals)
8. (United States) Bill Talbert (first round)
9. (Australia) Clive Wilderspin (first round)
10. (United States) Robert Perry (second round)
11. (Australia) Ian Ayre (second round)
12. (South Africa) Owen Williams (second round)
13. (Australia) John Bromwich (semifinals)
14. (South Africa) Abe Segal (second round)
15. (Australia) Neale Fraser (second round)
16. (France) Jean-Noël Grinda (second round)

== Draw ==
=== Key ===
- Q = Qualifier
- WC = Wild card
- LL = Lucky loser
- r = Retired

=== Finals ===
Quarterfinals
1	(Australia) Ken Rosewall	6	6	7
6	(United States) Ham Richardson	3	4	5
5	(Australia) Mervyn Rose	8	9	9	6
4	(United States) Vic Seixas	6	7	11	4
3	(Australia) Rex Hartwig	6	6	6
(Australia) Ashley Cooper	2	3	4
7	(Australia) George Worthington	6	3	6	3	1
13	(Australia) John Bromwich	3	6	2	6	6

Semifinals
1	(Australia) Ken Rosewall	3	3	6	6	5
5	(Australia) Mervyn Rose	6	6	3	1	7
3	(Australia) Rex Hartwig	8	6	9
13	(Australia) John Bromwich	6	4	7

Final
5	(Australia) Mervyn Rose	6	0	6	6
3	(Australia) Rex Hartwig	2	6	4	2

=== Earlier rounds ===
==== Section 1 ====
First round
1	(Australia) Rosewall	6	6	6
(Australia) Cawthorn	2	3	1
14	(South Africa) Segal	6	6	6
(United Kingdom) Pickard	4	1	4
11	(Australia) Ayre	6	6	6
(Australia) Reid	3	2	1
6	(United States) Richardson	6	7	6
(Australia) Mason	0	5	4
5	(Australia) Rose	6	6	6
(Australia) Meyer	3	2	3
10	(United States) Perry	2	6	6	6
(United Kingdom) Knight	6	2	4	3
15	(Australia) Fraser	6	6	6
(Australia) Anderson	3	3	0
4	(United States) Seixas	4	6	6	6
(Australia) O'Brien	6	4	1	3

Second round
1	(Australia) Rosewall	6	6	6
14	(South Africa) Segal	4	3	1
11	(Australia) Ayre	0	3	4
6	(United States) Richardson	6	6	6
5	(Australia) Rose	2	6	6	7
10	(United States) Perry	6	4	4	5
15	(Australia) Fraser	7	6	5
4	(United States) Seixas	9	8	7

Quarterfinals
1	(Australia) Rosewall	6	6	7
6	(United States) Richardson	3	4	5
5	(Australia) Rose	8	9	9	6
4	(United States) Seixas	6	7	11	4

Semifinals
1	(Australia) Rosewall	3	3	6	6	5
5	(Australia) Rose	6	6	3	1	7

==== Section 2 ====
First round
3	(Australia) Hartwig	7	6	6
(United Kingdom) Davies	5	3	4
16	(France) Grinda	6	6	6
(Australia) Hann	3	3	1
(Australia) Cooper	6	2	7	6
9	(Australia) Wilderspin	4	6	5	3
(Australia) Gilmour	6	8	6
8	(United States) Talbert	3	6	1
7	(Australia) Worthington	5	6	6	6
(Australia) Emerson	7	4	0	0
12	(South Africa) Williams	6	8	6
(Australia) Blacklock	4	6	1
13	(Australia) Bromwich	6	6	6
(Australia) Sherriff	2	3	1
2	(United States) Trabert	6	7	6
(Australia) Kennedy	4	5	4

Second round
3	(Australia) Hartwig	6	6	6
16	(France) Grinda	4	0	2
(Australia) Cooper	6	6	6
(Australia) Gilmour	4	2	3
7	(Australia) Worthington
12	(South Africa) Williams	w/o
13	(Australia) Bromwich	1	1	6	6	6
2	(United States) Trabert	6	6	2	3	1

Quarterfinals
3	(Australia) Hartwig	6	6	6
(Australia) Cooper	2	3	4
7	(Australia) Worthington	3	6	2	6	6
13	(Australia) Bromwich	6	3	6	3	1

Semifinals
3	(Australia) Hartwig	8	6	9
13	(Australia) Bromwich	6	4	7

Preceded by 1953 U.S. National Championships	Grand Slam men's singles	Succeeded by 1954 French Championships
