= 1954 Wimbledon Championships – Boys' singles =

Boys' singles
- 1954 Wimbledon Championships

Final
- Champion: (India) Ramanathan Krishnan
- Runner-up: (Australia) Ashley Cooper
- Score: 6–2, 7–5

Events
Singles	men	women		boys	girls
Doubles	men	women	mixed	boys	girls
← 1953 ·	Wimbledon Championships	· 1955 →

Ramanathan Krishnan defeated Ashley Cooper in the final, 6–2, 7–5 to win the boys' singles tennis title at the 1954 Wimbledon Championships.

== Draw ==
=== Key ===
- Q = Qualifier
- WC = Wild card
- LL = Lucky loser
- Alt = Alternate
- SE = Special exempt
- PR = Protected ranking
- ITF = ITF entry
- JE = Junior exempt
- w/o = Walkover
- r = Retired
- d = Defaulted
- SR = Special ranking

=== Finals ===
Semifinals
(Australia) Ashley Cooper	6	6
(United Kingdom) Reg Bennett	1	3
(France) Jean-Noël Grinda	3	7
(India) Ramanathan Krishnan	6	9

Final
(Australia) Ashley Cooper	2	5
(India) Ramanathan Krishnan	6	7

=== Top half ===
First round
(Belgium) Marc de Gronckel	0	1
(United Kingdom) Reg Bennett	6	6
(Republic of Ireland) J Drury-Byrne	3	6	1
(Israel) D Ass	6	2	6

Second round
(Australia) Ashley Cooper	6	6
(Switzerland) A Viscolo	3	0
(Austria) W Hehn	6	6
(Socialist Federal Republic of Yugoslavia) V Humar	2	1
(Norway) Jan Gundersen	5	5
(South Africa) Gordon Talbot	7	7
(United Kingdom) R Bennett	6	6
(Israel) D Ass	2	1

Quarterfinals
(Australia) A Cooper	6	6
(Austria) W Hehn	1	1
(South Africa) G Talbot	8	4	3
(United Kingdom) R Bennett	6	6	6

Semifinals
(Australia) A Cooper	6	6
(United Kingdom) R Bennett	1	3

=== Bottom half ===
First round
(West Germany) Klaus Stapper	2	3
(Israel) Eliezer Davidman	6	6

Second round
(Israel) E Davidman	1	2
(France) Jean-Noël Grinda	6	6
(Portugal) A Barreto	8	1
(Denmark) Jens Christaen Andersen	10	6
(Argentina) Eduardo Soriano	6	6
(Sweden) Birger Folke	1	2
(Netherlands) Pieter van Eijsden	1	3
(India) Ramanathan Krishnan	6	6

Quarterfinals
(France) J-N Grinda	6	6
(Denmark) JC Andersen	1	2
(Argentina) E Soriano	1	3
(India) R Krishnan	6	6

Semifinals
(France) J-N Grinda	3	7
(India) R Krishnan	6	9
