= E Tsai =

E Tsai may refer to:

- Cai E (1882–1916), a Chinese revolutionary leader and general.
- Edwin Tsai, a former Hong Kong tennis player who played from 1952 to 1954 at the Wimbledon Championships
