= 1953 Wimbledon Championships – Boys' singles =

Boys' singles
- 1953 Wimbledon Championships

Final
- Champion: (United Kingdom) Billy Knight
- Runner-up: (India) Ramanathan Krishnan
- Score: 7–5, 6–4

Events
Singles	men	women		boys	girls
Doubles	men	women	mixed	boys	girls
← 1952 ·	Wimbledon Championships	· 1954 →

Billy Knight defeated Ramanathan Krishnan in the final, 7–5, 6–4 to win the boys' singles tennis title at the 1953 Wimbledon Championships.

== Draw ==
=== Key ===
- Q = Qualifier
- WC = Wild card
- LL = Lucky loser
- Alt = Alternate
- SE = Special exempt
- PR = Protected ranking
- ITF = ITF entry
- JE = Junior exempt
- w/o = Walkover
- r = Retired
- d = Defaulted
- SR = Special ranking

=== Draw ===
First round
(Denmark) Jørgen Ulrich	6	4	6
(South Africa) Keith Malcolm	2	6	3
(Austria) H Stiehl	1	5
(Hungary) István Pálinkás	6	7
(Republic of Ireland) J O'Connell	1	1
(India) Ramanathan Krishnan	6	6
(West Germany) Günther Meyer	5	6	6
(Belgium) C Dewamme	7	2	2
(Dominion of Ceylon) Rupert Ferdinands	3	4
(France) Jean-Noël Grinda	6	6
(Jamaica) ES Hale	5	0
(Sweden) Jan-Erik Lundqvist	7	6
(United Kingdom) Billy Knight	6	6
(Norway) Gunnar Sjøwall	3	1
(Netherlands) Henk Bitter	6	6	6
(Switzerland) Heinrich Bertschinger	8	3	2

Quarterfinals
(Denmark) Jørgen Ulrich	6	6
(Hungary) István Pálinkás	4	4
(India) Ramanathan Krishnan	6	6
(West Germany) Günther Meyer	0	0
(France) Jean-Noël Grinda	6	6
(Sweden) Jan-Erik Lundqvist	4	1
(United Kingdom) Billy Knight	6	6
(Netherlands) Henk Bitter	0	2

Semifinals
(Denmark) Jørgen Ulrich	6	7	4
(India) Ramanathan Krishnan	8	5	6
(France) Jean-Noël Grinda	2	3
(United Kingdom) Billy Knight	6	6

Final
(India) Ramanathan Krishnan	5	4
(United Kingdom) Billy Knight	7	6
