= 1956 Australian Championships – Men's singles =

Men's singles
- 1956 Australian Championships

Final
- Champion: (Australia) Lew Hoad
- Runner-up: (Australia) Ken Rosewall
- Score: 6–4, 3–6, 6–4, 7–5

Details
- Draw: 32
- Seeds: 8

Events
Singles	men	women
Doubles	men	women
- Australian Championships

First-seeded Lew Hoad defeated Ken Rosewall 6–4, 3–6, 6–4, 7–5 in the final to win the men's singles tennis title at the 1956 Australian Championships.

== Seeds ==
The seeded players are listed below. Lew Hoad is the champion; others show the round in which they were eliminated.

1. (Australia) Lew Hoad (champion)
2. (Australia) Ken Rosewall (finalist)
3. (United States) Herbie Flam (semifinals)
4. (United States) Gilbert Shea (quarterfinals)
5. (Australia) Ashley Cooper (quarterfinals)
6. (Australia) Neale Fraser (semifinals)
7. (Australia) Mervyn Rose (quarterfinals)
8. (Australia) Mal Anderson (quarterfinals)

== Draw ==
=== Key ===
- Q = Qualifier
- WC = Wild card
- LL = Lucky loser
- r = Retired

=== Finals ===
Quarterfinals
1	(Australia) Lew Hoad	3	6	6	6	9
7	(Australia) Mervyn Rose	6	1	8	2	7
6	(Australia) Neale Fraser	6	6	6
4	(United States) Gilbert Shea	2	4	3
3	(United States) Herbie Flam	6	6	6	6
5	(Australia) Ashley Cooper	8	3	2	3
8	(Australia) Mal Anderson	4	3	7	6
2	(Australia) Ken Rosewall	6	6	5	8

Semifinals
1	(Australia) Lew Hoad	6	6	6
6	(Australia) Neale Fraser	3	2	0
3	(United States) Herbie Flam	4	0	2
2	(Australia) Ken Rosewall	6	6	6

Final
1	(Australia) Lew Hoad	6	3	6	7
2	(Australia) Ken Rosewall	4	6	4	5

=== Earlier rounds ===
==== Section 1 ====
First round
1	(Australia) Hoad	6	6	6
(Australia) Sheil	2	1	1
(Australia) Gilmour	6	6	6
(Australia) Stewart	4	2	4
7	(Australia) Rose	6	6	6
(Australia) Collins	2	0	2
(Australia) Mark	9	6	5	3	7
(Mexico) Reyes	7	2	7	6	5
6	(Australia) Fraser	8	6	3	6
(Australia) Jacques	6	4	6	1
(Australia) Phillips-Moore	6	6	6
(Australia) Green	2	0	3
(Australia) Emerson	6	6	6
(Australia) Dobbs	1	2	4
4	(United States) Shea	6	3	3	6	6
(Australia) Gibson	4	6	6	2	2

Second round
1	(Australia) Hoad	6	6	6
(Australia) Gilmour	2	3	2
7	(Australia) Rose	6	6	4	6
(Australia) Mark	1	2	6	4
6	(Australia) Fraser	2	6	6	6
(Australia) Phillips-Moore	6	0	2	3
(Australia) Emerson	3	8	6	1	2
4	(United States) Shea	6	6	3	6	6

Quarterfinals
1	(Australia) Hoad	3	6	6	6	9
7	(Australia) Rose	6	1	8	2	7
6	(Australia) Fraser	6	6	6
4	(United States) Shea	2	4	3

Semifinals
1	(Australia) Hoad	6	6	6
6	(Australia) Fraser	3	2	0

==== Section 2 ====
First round
3	(United States) Flam	6	6	6
(United States) Moss	0	1	0
(Australia) Candy	6	6	8
(Australia) Lovett	2	2	6
(Australia) Newman	4	6	6	6
(Australia) Flanders	6	4	4	4
5	(Australia) Cooper	6	6	6
(Australia) Young	1	1	1
(Australia) Bowman	6	3	5	13	6
(Australia) Laver	4	6	7	11	3
8	(Australia) Anderson	6	6	6
(Australia) Hearnden	3	1	4
(Australia) Reid	6	6	6
(Australia) Shepherd	3	1	1
2	(Australia) Rosewall	6	6	6
(Australia) Brant	1	2	1

Second round
3	(United States) Flam	1	8	6	6
(Australia) Candy	6	6	4	3
(Australia) Newman	4	7	0
5	(Australia) Cooper	6	9	6
(Australia) Bowman	2	6	3	2
8	(Australia) Anderson	6	4	6	6
(Australia) Reid	1	4	1
2	(Australia) Rosewall	6	6	6

Quarterfinals
3	(United States) Flam	6	6	6	6
5	(Australia) Cooper	8	3	2	3
8	(Australia) Anderson	4	3	7	6
2	(Australia) Rosewall	6	6	5	8

Semifinals
3	(United States) Flam	4	0	2
2	(Australia) Rosewall	6	6	6

== See also ==
- 1956 Australian Championships – Women's singles

Preceded by 1955 U.S. National Championships	Grand Slam men's singles	Succeeded by 1956 French Championships
