= 1954 Wimbledon Championships – Girls' singles =

Girls' singles
- 1954 Wimbledon Championships

Final
- Champion: (United Kingdom) Valerie Pitt
- Runner-up: (France) Colette Monnot
- Score: 5–7, 6–3, 6–2

Details
- Draw: 13

Events
Singles	men	women		boys	girls
Doubles	men	women	mixed	boys	girls
← 1953 ·	Wimbledon Championships	· 1955 →

Valerie Pitt defeated Colette Monnot in the final, 5–7, 6–3, 6–2 to win the girls' singles tennis title at the 1954 Wimbledon Championships.

== Draw ==
=== Key ===
- Q = Qualifier
- WC = Wild card
- LL = Lucky loser
- Alt = Alternate
- SE = Special exempt
- PR = Protected ranking
- ITF = ITF entry
- JE = Junior exempt
- w/o = Walkover
- r = Retired
- d = Defaulted
- SR = Special ranking

=== Draw ===
First round
(Sweden) L Engdahl	6	6
(Jamaica) D Crampton	3	3
(Belgium) M Pouchain	3	6	6
(Norway) E Aarstad	6	2	1
(Socialist Federal Republic of Yugoslavia) Jelena Genčić	0	1
(West Germany) Ilse Buding	6	6
(Netherlands) C Wilmink	7	8
(Denmark) J Hansen	5	6
(Switzerland) Veronika Studer	6	1
(Republic of Ireland) Mary O'Sullivan	8	6

Quarterfinals
(France) Colette Monnot	6	6
(Sweden) L Engdahl	0	2
(Belgium) M Pouchain	6	2	6
(West Germany) Ilse Buding	1	6	2
(Netherlands) C Wilmink	5	1
(Republic of Ireland) Mary O'Sullivan	7	6
(West Germany) Karin Warnke	2	3
(United Kingdom) Valerie Pitt	6	6

Semifinals
(France) Colette Monnot	6	6
(Belgium) M Pouchain	4	1
(Republic of Ireland) Mary O'Sullivan	1	1
(United Kingdom) Valerie Pitt	6	6

Final
(France) Colette Monnot	7	3	2
(United Kingdom) Valerie Pitt	5	6	6
