= 1954 Wimbledon Championships =

- Date: 21 June – 3 July
- Edition: 68th
- Category: Grand Slam
- Surface: Grass
- Location: Church Road; SW19, Wimbledon, London, United Kingdom
- Venue: All England Lawn Tennis and Croquet Club

Champions

Men's singles
- (Egypt) Jaroslav Drobný

Women's singles
- (United States) Maureen Connolly

Men's doubles
- (Australia) Rex Hartwig / (Australia) Mervyn Rose

Women's doubles
- (United States) Louise Brough / (United States) Margaret Osborne duPont

Mixed doubles
- (United States) Vic Seixas / (United States) Doris Hart

Boys' singles
- (India) Ramanathan Krishnan

Girls' singles
- (United Kingdom) Valerie Pitt
← 1953 ·	Wimbledon Championships	· 1955 →

The 1954 Wimbledon Championships took place on the outdoor grass courts at the All England Lawn Tennis and Croquet Club in Wimbledon, London, United Kingdom. The tournament was held from Monday 21 June until Saturday 3 July 1954. It was the 68th staging of the Wimbledon Championships, and the third Grand Slam tennis event of 1954. Jaroslav Drobný and Maureen Connolly won the singles titles.

== Finals ==
=== Seniors ===
==== Men's singles ====
(Egypt) Jaroslav Drobný defeated (Australia) Ken Rosewall, 13–11, 4–6, 6–2, 9–7

==== Women's singles ====
(United States) Maureen Connolly defeated (United States) Louise Brough, 6–2, 7–5

==== Men's doubles ====
(Australia) Rex Hartwig / (Australia) Mervyn Rose defeated (United States) Vic Seixas / (United States) Tony Trabert, 6–4, 6–4, 3–6, 6–4

==== Women's doubles ====
(United States) Louise Brough / (United States) Margaret duPont defeated (United States) Shirley Fry / (United States) Doris Hart, 4–6, 9–7, 6–3

==== Mixed doubles ====
(United States) Vic Seixas / (United States) Doris Hart defeated (Australia) Ken Rosewall / (United States) Margaret duPont, 5–7, 6–4, 6–3

=== Juniors ===
==== Boys' singles ====
(India) Ramanathan Krishnan defeated (Australia) Ashley Cooper, 6–2, 7–5

==== Girls' singles ====
(United Kingdom) Valerie Pitt defeated (France) Colette Monnot, 5–7, 6–3, 6–2

Preceded by 1954 French Championships	Grand Slams	Succeeded by 1954 U.S. National Championships
