= Eduardo Argon =

Uruguayan tennis player (1930–2019)

- Country (sports): Uruguay
- Born: 22 January 1930 Lavalleja, Uruguay
- Died: 18 August 2019 (aged 89) Ancey, France
- Turned pro: 1949
- Retired: 1969

Singles
- Career titles: 1

Grand Slam singles results
- Wimbledon: 2R (1954, 1957)

Grand Slam doubles results
- Wimbledon: 3R (1954, 1958)

Grand Slam mixed doubles results
- Wimbledon: 1R (1952)

Eduardo Pascal Argon (22 January 1930 – 19 August 2019) was a Uruguayan tennis player. He won the 1954 Riviera Championships at Menton in March of that year, defeating Aleco Noghes in the final.

== Biography ==
Eduardo Pascal Argon was born in Lavalleja, Uruguay on 22 January 1930. He reached Wimbledon's second round in men's single twice, in 1954 and 1957. He also reached the third round in Wimbledon men's double twice, in 1954, 1958.

He continued playing tennis also after retirement, well into his 80s.

Argon died in Ancey, France on 18 August 2019, at the age of 89.

== Career finals ==
=== Singles ===
Result	Date	Tournament	Surface	Opponent	Score	Ref.
Win	1954	Riviera Championships	Clay	(Monaco) Aleco Noghes	6–3, 6–4, 9–7	
Loss	1957	Kulm Carlton Tournament	Clay	(Belgium) Jacques Peten	4–6, 7–5, 2–6	
