= 1954 Davis Cup =

1954 edition of the Davis Cup

Details
- Duration: 30 April – 29 December 1954
- Edition: 43rd
- Teams: 31

Champion
- Winning nation: United States

The 1954 Davis Cup was the 43rd edition of the Davis Cup, the most important tournament between national teams in men's tennis. 23 teams entered the Europe Zone and 7 teams entered the America Zone. The Eastern Zone was abandoned for this year and India, the sole competing country, was moved to the Europe Zone.

The United States defeated Mexico in the America Zone final, and Sweden defeated France in the Europe Zone final. The United States defeated Sweden in the Inter-Zonal Final, and then defeated the defending champions Australia in the Challenge Round, ending Australia's four-year championship run. The final was played at White City Stadium in Sydney, Australia on 27–29 December.

== America Zone ==
=== Draw ===
Quarterfinals; 9–18 July
Cuba
bye
Port of Spain, Trinidad and Tobago (clay)
United States	5
Caribbean/West Indies	0
Mexico City, Mexico (clay)
Mexico	3
Japan	2
Toronto, Canada (grass)
Chile	2
Canada	3

Semifinals; 31 July–22 August
St. Petersburg, FL, United States (grass)
Cuba	0
United States	5
Mexico City, Mexico (clay)
Mexico	4
Canada	1

Final; 1–3 October
Mexico City, Mexico (clay)
United States	4
Mexico	1

=== Final ===
Mexico vs. United States

Mexico
1
Centro Deportivo Chapultepec, Mexico City, Mexico
1–3 October 1954
Clay

United States
4

			1	2	3	4	5
1	(Mexico) (United States)	Gustavo Palafox; Vic Seixas	6; 4	6; 4	7; 5
2	(Mexico) (United States)	Mario Llamas; Tony Trabert	4; 6	3; 6	6; 8
3	(Mexico) (United States)	Mario Llamas / Gustavo Palafox; Vic Seixas / Tony Trabert	2; 6	6; 3	1; 6	4; 6
4	(Mexico) (United States)	Mario Llamas; Vic Seixas	4; 6	6; 2	3; 6	2; 6
5	(Mexico) (United States)	Gustavo Palafox; Tony Trabert	12; 14	1; 6	2; 6

== Europe Zone ==
=== Draw ===
First Round; 30 April–8 May
Denmark
bye
Luxembourg
bye
West Germany
bye
Hungary	3
New Zealand	2
India
bye
Austria	3
Ireland	2
France
bye
Finland	2
Norway	3
Netherlands	1
Spain	4
bye
Italy
Egypt	4
Turkey	1
bye
Sweden
Monaco	1
Yugoslavia	4
bye
Belgium
Switzerland	1
Brazil	3
bye
Great Britain

Second Round; 13–17 May
Mondorf-les-Bains, Luxembourg (clay)
Denmark	5
Luxembourg	0
Budapest, Hungary
West Germany	1
Hungary	4
Vienna, Austria
India	3
Austria	0
Oslo, Norway (clay)
France	5
Norway	0
Madrid, Spain (clay)
Spain	0
Italy	5
Cairo, Egypt (clay)
Egypt	0
Sweden	5
Brussels, Belgium
Yugoslavia	0
Belgium	5
Eastbourne, England (grass)
Brazil	1
Great Britain	4

Quarterfinals; 10–15 June
Copenhagen, Denmark (clay)
Denmark	4
Hungary	1
Paris, France (clay)
India	1
France	4
Solna, Sweden (clay)
Italy	0
Sweden	5
Scarborough, England (grass)
Belgium	3
Great Britain	2

Semifinals; 9–19 July
Copenhagen, Denmark (clay)
Denmark	1
France	4
Båstad, Sweden (clay)
Sweden	3
Belgium	2

Final; 24–26 July
Paris, France (clay)
France	0
Sweden	5

=== Final ===
France vs. Sweden

France
0
Stade Roland Garros, Paris, France
24–26 July 1954
Clay

Sweden
5

			1	2	3	4	5
1	(France) (Sweden)	Robert Haillet; Lennart Bergelin	6; 4	5; 7	6; 3	3; 6	0; 6
2	(France) (Sweden)	Paul Rémy; Sven Davidson	1; 6	6; 3	3; 6	4; 6
3	(France) (Sweden)	Jean Ducos de la Haille / Paul Rémy; Sven Davidson / Torsten Johansson	3; 6	4; 6	6; 3	7; 9
4	(France) (Sweden)	Paul Rémy; Lennart Bergelin	2; 6	3; 6	8; 6	4; 6
5	(France) (Sweden)	Robert Haillet; Sven Davidson	4; 6	4; 6	6; 4	3; 6

== Inter-Zonal Final ==
United States vs. Sweden

United States
5
Milton Courts, Brisbane, Australia
16–18 December 1954
Grass

Sweden
0

			1	2	3	4	5
1	(United States) (Sweden)	Tony Trabert; Sven Davidson	6; 4	6; 3	6; 4
2	(United States) (Sweden)	Vic Seixas; Lennart Bergelin	5; 7	6; 2	6; 4	5; 7	6; 2
3	(United States) (Sweden)	Vic Seixas / Tony Trabert; Lennart Bergelin / Sven Davidson	6; 3	6; 4	6; 3
4	(United States) (Sweden)	Tony Trabert; Lennart Bergelin	6; 2	6; 2	3; 6	6; 2
5	(United States) (Sweden)	Ham Richardson; Sven Davidson	6; 0	6; 3	6; 3

== Challenge Round ==
Australia vs. United States

Australia
2
White City Stadium, Sydney, Australia
27–29 December 1954
Grass

United States
3

			1	2	3	4	5
1	(Australia) (United States)	Lew Hoad; Tony Trabert	4; 6	6; 2	10; 12	3; 6
2	(Australia) (United States)	Ken Rosewall; Vic Seixas	6; 8	8; 6	4; 6	3; 6
3	(Australia) (United States)	Lew Hoad / Ken Rosewall; Vic Seixas / Tony Trabert	2; 6	6; 4	2; 6	8; 10
4	(Australia) (United States)	Ken Rosewall; Tony Trabert	9; 7	7; 5	6; 3
5	(Australia) (United States)	Rex Hartwig; Vic Seixas	4; 6	6; 3	6; 2	6; 3
