= Francis Nys =

French tennis player

- Country (sports): France
- Born: 1930
- Died: 2017 (aged 86)

Grand Slam singles results
- French Open: 3R (1953, 1955)
- Wimbledon: 2R (1954)

Francis Nys (1930 — 2017) was a French tennis player.

Active in the 1950s, Nys regularly competed in the French national championships and made the singles third round on two occasions. He also featured in two editions of the Wimbledon Championships.

Nys was a squad member on the France Davis Cup team, without playing a rubber.

== Personal life ==
One of his grandsons, Hugo Nys, is a professional tennis player.
