= Gilbert Shea =

American tennis player (1928–2020)

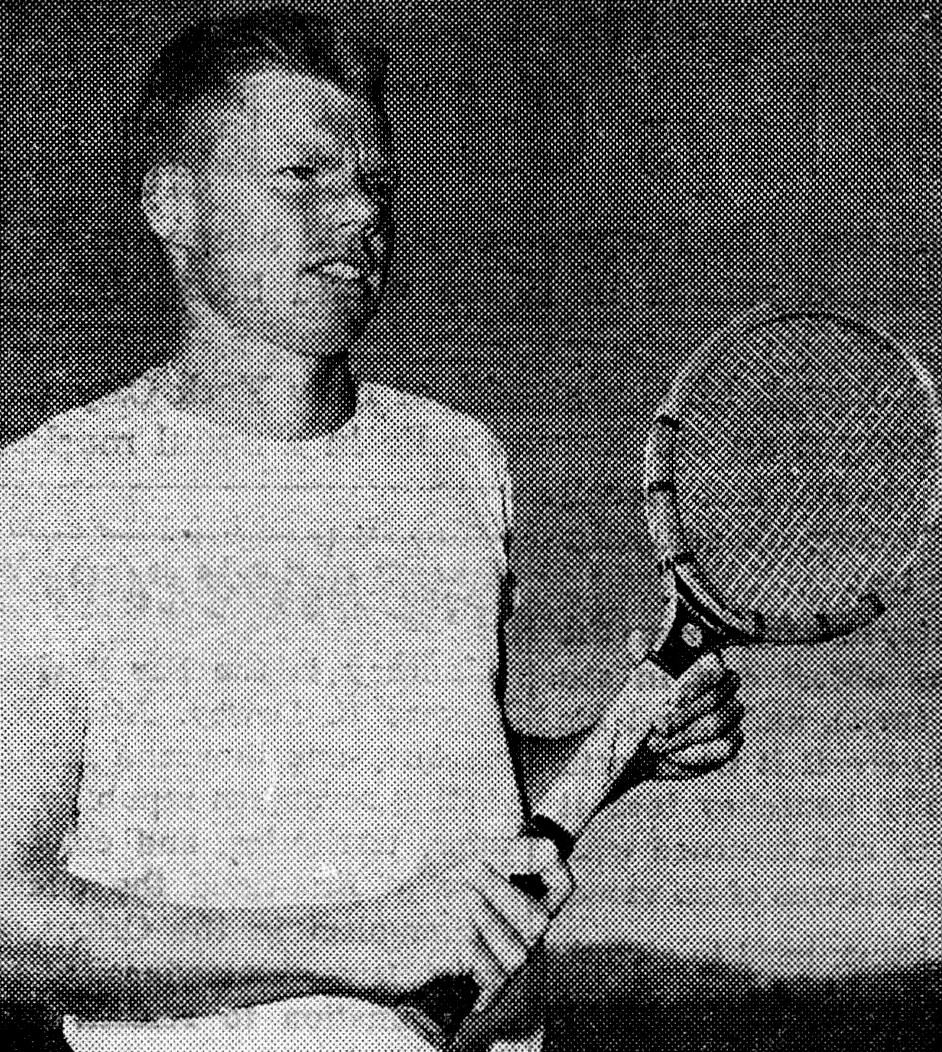
- Shea, circa 1952
- Full name: Gilbert James Shea
- Country (sports): USA
- Born: 5 October 1928 Portland, Oregon, United States
- Died: December 23, 2020 (aged 92) Pacific Palisades, California, United States
- Turned pro: 1946 (amateur tour)
- Retired: 1959

Singles

Grand Slam singles results
- Australian Open: QF (1956)
- French Open: 3R (1954)
- Wimbledon: 4R (1954, 1955)
- US Open: 4R (1956)

Doubles

Grand Slam doubles results
- Australian Open: QF (1956)

Mixed doubles

Grand Slam mixed doubles results
- Australian Open: 2R (1956)

Gilbert James Shea (5 October 1928 - 23 December 2020) was an American tennis player.

Although born in Oregon, Shea and his family moved to California when he was three years old. He started playing tennis when he was around eight years old. Big serving Shea was ranked as high as number 4 in the U. S. in 1957.

Making his Grand Slam debut at the U. S. championships in 1948, Shea lost in round three to Jaroslav Drobny. In 1949 he lost in round two to Edward Moylan and in 1950 lost in round one to Hugh Stewart. At the 1952 U. S. Championships, Shea lost in round three to Mervyn Rose. In 1953 he lost in round three to Arthur Larsen. At Roland Garros in 1954 Shea lost in round three to Jaroslav Drobny. At Wimbledon, he lost in the last 16 to Rex Hartwig. At the U. S. Championships, he beat Luis Ayala before losing in round three to Moylan. At Wimbledon 1955, Shea beat Vic Seixas and Adrian Quist before losing in the last 16 to Nicola Pietrangeli. He lost in round one of the U. S. championships. At the 1956 Australian championships, Shea beat a young Roy Emerson (who won 6 titles in the 1960s) before losing in the quarter finals to Neale Fraser. Shea lost in round two of Wimbledon. He reached the last 16 at U. S. championships, losing to Fraser. In 1957 Shea lost in round two of Roland Garros, round one of Wimbledon and round three at U. S. championships.

Shea won the U.S. Hardcourt Championships in 1954 at La Jolla, California. He won the Ojai Tennis Tournament in 1955, 1956, and 1957. Shea won the Shadow Mountain tournament at Palm Desert, California in 1955, defeating Art Larsen and Herb Flam in the final two rounds.

Shea then lost in round one of Wimbledon 1958 and round two at U.S. championships in 1959 and then retired. In later life he played a lot of golf recreationally.

He died aged 92 on 23 December 2020.
