= Franz Saiko =

Austrian tennis player (1931–2012)

- Country (sports): Austria
- Born: 16 February 1931
- Died: 28 August 2012 (aged 81)
- Plays: Right-handed

Singles

Grand Slam singles results
- Wimbledon: 2R (1955, 1957, 1958, 1961)

Doubles

Grand Slam doubles results
- Wimbledon: 3R (1954)

Grand Slam mixed doubles results
- Wimbledon: 2R (1954, 1958)

Franz Saiko (16 February 1931 – 28 August 2012) was an Austrian tennis player.

A native of Vienna, Saiko was a regular fixture in the Austria Davis Cup team from 1954 to 1962, winning a total of 22 rubbers. His best win came against Britain's Mike Sangster in a 1962 tie in Vienna.

Saiko was not known to tour much overseas but made several appearances at the Wimbledon Championships. In 1954 he reached the doubles round of 16 with Hans Redl.

Outside of tennis he worked as a pharmacist.

== See also ==
- List of Austria Davis Cup team representatives
