= Ivor Warwick =

British tennis player

- Country (sports): United Kingdom
- Born: 19 March 1934
- Died: 4 June 2017 (aged 83)

Singles

Grand Slam singles results
- Wimbledon: 3R (1953, 1956)

Doubles

Grand Slam doubles results
- Wimbledon: 3R (1958)

Grand Slam mixed doubles results
- Wimbledon: 2R (1953, 54, 55, 56, 57, 58)

Ivor Warwick (19 March 1934 — 4 June 2017) was a British tennis player of the 1950s and 1960s.

Raised in the Manchester area, Warwick was most successful on the tennis tour in the 1950s, with his title wins that decade including the East of England Championships and North of England Hardcout Championships.

Warwick was a Lancashire county player and earned blues in Cambridge University tennis.

During his regular Wimbledon appearances, Warwick twice made the singles third round, including a loss to top seed Ken Rosewall in 1953. He never missed a men's doubles main draw at Wimbledon between 1952 and 1966.

Warwick's wife, the former Anthea Gibb, was also a tennis player.
