= John Barry (tennis) =

New Zealand tennis player

- Full name: John A. Barry
- Country (sports): New Zealand
- Born: 10 December 1928 (age 97) New Zealand

Singles

Grand Slam singles results
- Australian Open: 2R (1951)
- French Open: 2R (1947, 1954)
- Wimbledon: 2R (1947)

Doubles

Grand Slam doubles results
- Australian Open: 1R (1951)
- Wimbledon: QF (1954)

Mixed doubles

Grand Slam mixed doubles results
- Wimbledon: 2R (1947)

Team competitions
- Davis Cup: QF^{Eu} (1947)

John A. Barry (born 10 December 1928) was a New Zealand tennis player. He played for New Zealand in the Davis Cup of 1947 and 1954.
