= Vic Seixas =

American tennis player (1923–2024)

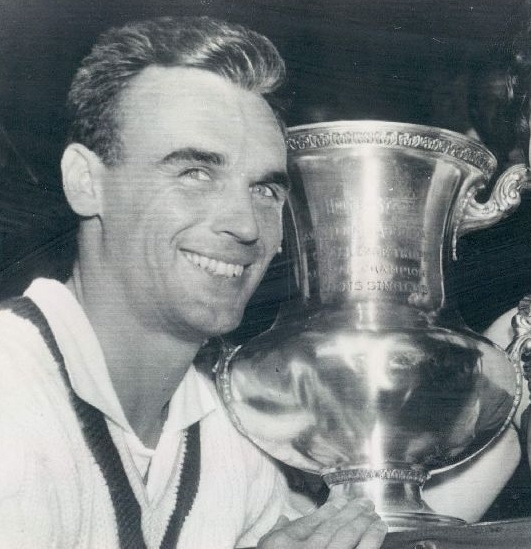
- Seixas in 1954
- Full name: Elias Victor Seixas Jr.
- Country (sports): United States
- Born: August 30, 1923 Philadelphia, Pennsylvania, U.S.
- Died: July 5, 2024 (aged 100) Mill Valley, California, U.S.
- Height: 1.85 m (6 ft 1 in)
- Retired: 1970
- Plays: Right-handed (one-handed backhand)
- Int. Tennis HoF: 1971 (member page)

Singles
- Career record: 801–236 (77.2%)
- Career titles: 49
- Highest ranking: No. 1 (1954, Harry Hopman)

Grand Slam singles results
- Australian Open: SF (1953)
- French Open: F (1953)
- Wimbledon: W (1953)
- US Open: W (1954)

Doubles
- Career record: 4–9

Grand Slam doubles results
- Australian Open: W (1955)
- French Open: W (1954, 1955)
- Wimbledon: F (1952, 1954)
- US Open: W (1952, 1954)

Grand Slam mixed doubles results
- French Open: W (1953)
- Wimbledon: W (1953, 1954, 1955, 1956)
- US Open: W (1953, 1954, 1955)

Team competitions
- Davis Cup: W (1954)

Elias Victor Seixas Jr. (/ˈseɪʃəs/ SAY-shəs; August 30, 1923 – July 5, 2024) was an American tennis player.

Seixas was ranked in the top ten in the U.S. on 13 occasions from 1942 to 1956. In 1951, Seixas was ranked No. 4 amateur in the world, two spots below Dick Savitt, while he was No. 1 in the U.S. ranking, one spot ahead of Savitt. In 1953, Seixas was ranked No. 3 in the world by Lance Tingay. In 1954, Seixas was ranked amateur number one by Harry Hopman.

In his career, Seixas won 15 Major championships. He won both Wimbledon and the US Open in singles. He also won the Australian Open, French Open (twice), and US Open (twice) in doubles, and the French Open, Wimbledon (four times), and US Open (three times) in mixed doubles.

Seixas was inducted into the International Tennis Hall of Fame, the Blue Gray National Tennis Classic Hall of Fame, the Philadelphia Sports Hall of Fame, and the Southern Conference Hall of Fame.

== Early life ==
Seixas was born on August 30, 1923 in Philadelphia, Pennsylvania, to Anna Victoria (née Moon), who was of Irish descent, and Elias Victor Seixas, who was born in the Dominican Republic, of Dutch-Jewish descent. He is reported to have been Jewish by a number of sources, but was raised Presbyterian. He attended and graduated from the William Penn Charter School, where he was a tennis star.

Seixas served as a pilot in the United States Army Air Corps during World War II for three years, which interrupted his tennis career. He then attended the University of North Carolina at Chapel Hill, where he was a member of Alpha Sigma chapter of the Chi Psi fraternity. He was 63–3 at UNC, won the Southern Conference singles championship in 1948 and the doubles championship in 1949, and was an All-American. He graduated in 1949, the same year that UNC awarded him the Patterson Medal, the school's top medal in athletics.

== Tennis career ==
During the course of his lengthy career, Seixas won scores of singles, doubles, and mixed doubles titles. He entered the US Championships men's singles a record 28 times from 1940 to 1969.

Seixas was ranked in the top ten in the US 13 times from 1942 to 1956. In 1951, Seixas was ranked No. 4 in the world, two spots below Dick Savitt, while he was No. 1 in the US ranking (a ranking he also held in 1954 and 1957), one spot ahead of Savitt. In 1953, Seixas was ranked No. 3 in the world by Lance Tingay and was cited as being the world No. 1 in the Reading Eagle the same year.

His major singles wins include Wimbledon in 1953 over Kurt Nielsen (where his 'cash' winnings was a £25 certificate to spend at a shop in Piccadilly Circus) and the US National (U.S. Open) in 1954 over Rex Hartwig.

Seixas was also a successful doubles and mixed doubles player. In 1952, he won the US National doubles with Mervyn Rose. In the mid-1950s, he formed a successful partnership with Tony Trabert, winning the 1954 French and US Championships, as well as the 1955 Australian and French Championships. Additionally, they won the decisive third point in the 1954 Davis Cup win over Australia. Seixas won four consecutive mixed doubles crowns at Wimbledon from 1953 to 1956, the first three with Doris Hart and the fourth with Shirley Fry; the US National mixed doubles from 1953 to 1955, all with Doris Hart; and the French Championships mixed doubles in 1953 with Doris Hart.

In 1966, at 42 years of age, Seixas played 94 games over four hours to defeat 22-year old Australian Bill Bowrey, 32–34, 6–4, 10–8 at the 1966 Philadelphia Grass Championship.

=== Davis Cup ===
Seixas and Trabert won the Davis Cup in 1954, against Australia. Seixas is rated fifth in the category of most Davis Cup Singles matches (24), just behind Bill Tilden (25) and Arthur Ashe (27). He served three times as Captain of the US Davis Cup team. He was 38–17 lifetime in Davis Cup matches.

=== Halls of Fame ===
Seixas was inducted into the International Tennis Hall of Fame in 1971. He was also inducted into the Blue Gray National Tennis Classic Hall of Fame.

Seixas was inducted into Class II of the Philadelphia Sports Hall of Fame in 2005. He was inducted into the Southern Conference Hall of Fame in 2011.

== After tennis retirement ==
Seixas was a stockbroker from the late 1950s until the early 1970s. Afterward, he worked as a tennis director for the Greenbrier Resort in White Sulphur Springs, West Virginia and at a Hilton Hotel in New Orleans.

He moved to California in 1989, where he lived in Mill Valley and established a tennis program at the Harbor Point Racquet and Beach Club in Mill Valley (Marin County), now known as The Club at Harbor Point. In 1998, unable to play tennis any longer due to his knees, he chose to become a bartender at Harbor Point. After several years bartending and helping with the club's front desk duties, he retired.

Seixas was the oldest living Grand Slam singles champion in the world, and the oldest living member of the Tennis Hall of Fame, having turned 100 on August 30, 2023.

Seixas died at his home in Mill Valley on July 5, 2024, at the age of 100.

== Grand Slam finals ==
=== Singles: 5 (2 titles, 3 runners-up) ===
Result	Year	Championship	Surface	Opponent	Score
Loss	1951	U.S. Championships	Grass	(Australia) Frank Sedgman	4–6, 1–6, 1–6
Loss	1953	French Championships	Clay	(Australia) Ken Rosewall	3–6, 4–6, 6–1, 2–6
Win	1953	Wimbledon	Grass	(Denmark) Kurt Nielsen	9–7, 6–3, 6–4
Loss	1953	U.S. Championships	Grass	(United States) Tony Trabert	3–6, 2–6, 3–6
Win	1954	U.S. Championships	Grass	(Australia) Rex Hartwig	3–6, 6–2, 6–4, 6–4

=== Doubles: 8 (5 titles, 3 runners-up) ===
Result	Year	Championship	Surface	Partner	Opponents	Score
Loss	1952	Wimbledon	Grass	(South Africa) Eric Sturgess	(Australia) Ken McGregor (Australia) Frank Sedgman	3–6, 5–7, 4–6
Win	1952	U.S. Championships	Grass	(Australia) Mervyn Rose	(Australia) Ken McGregor (Australia) Frank Sedgman	3–6, 10–8, 10–8, 6–8, 8–6
Win	1954	French Championships	Clay	(United States) Tony Trabert	(Australia) Lew Hoad (Australia) Ken Rosewall	6–4, 6–2, 6–1
Loss	1954	Wimbledon	Grass	(United States) Tony Trabert	(Australia) Rex Hartwig (Australia) Mervyn Rose	4–6, 4–6, 6–3, 4–6
Win	1954	U.S. Championships	Grass	(United States) Tony Trabert	(Australia) Lew Hoad (Australia) Ken Rosewall	3–6, 6–4, 8–6, 6–3
Win	1955	Australian Championships	Grass	(United States) Tony Trabert	(Australia) Lew Hoad (Australia) Ken Rosewall	6–3, 6–2, 2–6, 3–6, 6–1
Win	1955	French Championships	Clay	(United States) Tony Trabert	(Italy) Nicola Pietrangeli (Italy) Orlando Sirola	6–1, 4–6, 6–2, 6–4
Loss	1956	U.S. Championships	Grass	(United States) Ham Richardson	(Australia) Lew Hoad (Australia) Ken Rosewall	2–6, 2–6, 6–3, 4–6

=== Mixed doubles: 8 (8 titles) ===
Result	Year	Championship	Surface	Partner	Opponents	Score
Win	1953	French Championships	Clay	(United States) Doris Hart	(United States) Maureen Connolly (Australia) Mervyn Rose	4–6, 6–4, 6–0
Win	1953	Wimbledon	Grass	(United States) Doris Hart	(United States) Shirley Fry (Argentina) Enrique Morea	9–7, 7–5
Win	1953	U.S. Championships	Grass	(United States) Doris Hart	(United States) Julia Sampson (Australia) Rex Hartwig	6–2, 4–6, 6–4
Win	1954	Wimbledon	Grass	(United States) Doris Hart	(United States) Margaret duPont (Australia) Ken Rosewall	5–7, 6–4, 6–3
Win	1954	U.S. Championships	Grass	(United States) Doris Hart	(United States) Margaret duPont (Australia) Ken Rosewall	4–6, 6–1, 6–1
Win	1955	Wimbledon	Grass	(United States) Doris Hart	(United States) Louise Brough (Argentina) Enrique Morea	8–6, 2–6, 6–3
Win	1955	U.S. Championships	Grass	(United States) Doris Hart	(United States) Shirley Fry (Australia) Lew Hoad	9–7, 6–1
Win	1956	Wimbledon	Grass	(United States) Shirley Fry	(United States) Gardnar Mulloy (United States) Althea Gibson	2–6, 6–2, 7–5

== Grand Slam performance timeline ==
Key
W	F	SF	QF	#R	RR	Q#	DNQ	A	NH

(W) winner; (F) finalist; (SF) semifinalist; (QF) quarterfinalist; (#R) rounds 4, 3, 2, 1; (RR) round-robin stage; (Q#) qualification round; (DNQ) did not qualify; (A) absent; (NH) not held; (SR) strike rate (events won / competed); (W–L) win–loss record.

Tournament	1940	1941	1942	1943	1944	1945	1946	1947	1948	1949	1950	1951	1952	1953	1954	1955	1956	1957	1958	1959	1960	1961	1962	1963	1964	1965	1966	1967	1968	1969	SR	W–L	Win %
Australian Open	A	A	A	A	A	A	A	A	A	A	A	A	A	SF	QF	QF	A	A	A	A	A	A	A	A	A	A	A	A	A	A	0 / 3	7–3	70.0
French Open	A	A	A	A	A	A	A	A	A	A	QF	A	A	F	QF	QF	A	A	A	A	A	A	A	A	A	A	A	A	A	A	0 / 4	16–4	80.0
Wimbledon	A	A	A	A	A	A	A	A	A	A	SF	A	QF	W	QF	2R	SF	QF	A	A	A	A	A	A	A	A	A	2R	A	1R	1 / 9	31–8	79.5
US Open	3R	3R	2R	A	2R	A	3R	4R	4R	1R	3R	F	4R	F	W	SF	SF	QF	QF	4R	4R	3R	4R	3R	4R	4R	2R	2R	2R	1R	1 / 28	75–27	73.5
Win–loss	1–1	2–1	1–1	0–0	1–1	0–0	1–1	3–1	3–1	0–1	11–3	6–1	7–2	22–3	16–3	10–4	10–2	8–2	4–1	3–1	3–1	2–1	3–1	2–1	3–1	3–1	1–1	2–2	1–1	0–2	2 / 44	129–42	75.4

== See also ==
- List of select Jewish tennis players
