= Andrés Hammersley =

Chilean tennis player (1919–2002)

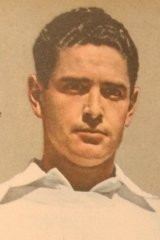
Hammersley in 1942

Andrés Hammersley Núñez (17 October 1919 — 10 January 2002) was a Chilean tennis player. He is considered one of the main referents of the tennis of his country in the 1940s and 1950s. Hammersley was nicknamed «the Huaso».

== Biography ==
He was son of the athlete Rodolfo Hammersley and Lucía Núñez, and brother of the skier Arturo Hammersley. Simultaneously to his tennis career, he studied contact lens therapy in Germany, being one of the early Chilean specialists in this area.

He had three marriages, one of them with Carla Timmerman. He spoke Spanish, English, French, and German.

== Sport career ==
In 1941, he won his first Tennis Chilean championship, which repeated consecutively until 1946. Also he was runner-up in the Argentinian championship in 1945, and won the South American championship in 1943 and 1946.

He was the first Chilean to participate in the international tournament of Forest Hills —current US Open— in 1945, and the following year, he was invited to the Wimbledon Championship, where after being defeated by Dinny Pails, he suffered a mental confusion that dropped him out of tracks until 1948. He returned to Wimbledon in 1954, participating in all the versions of the tournament until 1958.

He was part of the Chilean team of Davis Cup from 1954 to 1957, being nominated in eight opportunities, and he played in the semifinal of the 1955 European zone against Sweden. He won 10 Davis Cup matches and lost 13.

== Grand Slam performance timeline ==
Key
W	F	SF	QF	#R	RR	Q#	DNQ	A	NH

(W) winner; (F) finalist; (SF) semifinalist; (QF) quarterfinalist; (#R) rounds 4, 3, 2, 1; (RR) round-robin stage; (Q#) qualification round; (DNQ) did not qualify; (A) absent; (NH) not held; (SR) strike rate (events won / competed); (W–L) win–loss record.

Tournament	1945	1946	...	1954	1955	1956	1957	1958	W–L
Australian Championships	Absent								0–0
French Championships	A	3R		2R	1R	2R	3R	A	3–5
Wimbledon	A	1R		2R	1R	1R	2R	1R	2–6
U.S. Championships	2R	3R		3R	1R	A	A	A	2–4
