= Edwin Tsai =

Hong Kong tennis player

- Country (sports): Hong Kong
- Plays: Left-handed

Singles

Grand Slam singles results
- Wimbledon: 2R (1953, 1954)

Doubles

Grand Slam doubles results
- Wimbledon: 2R (1952, 1954)

Grand Slam mixed doubles results
- Wimbledon: 4R (1953)

Edwin Tsai is a Hong Kong former tennis player. Edwin is his birth name.

A left-hander, Tsai was the leading Hong Kong player of the 1950s, along with Ip Koon Hung. He featured in three editions of the Wimbledon Championships, reaching the singles second round twice. His tours of England included several tournament final appearances, including Moseley in 1952 and the Priory Club in 1953.
