= Mark Otway =

New Zealand tennis player

- Full name: Mark Anthony Otway
- Country (sports): New Zealand
- Born: 9 October 1931 Takapuna, New Zealand
- Died: 2014 Noosa, Queensland, Australia

Grand Slam singles results
- Australian Open: 1R (1951)
- French Open: 3R (1959)
- Wimbledon: 3R (1954, 1960)

Grand Slam doubles results
- Australian Open: 1R (1951)
- Wimbledon: QF (1954)

Grand Slam mixed doubles results
- Wimbledon: SF (1954)

Mark Anthony Otway (9 October 1931 – 2014) was a New Zealand tennis player. Born in Takapuna in 1931, Otway was educated at Takapuna Grammar School, and then, from 1946 to 1948, Mount Albert Grammar School. He competed at Wimbledon on eight occasions between 1954 and 1965, and once at the Australian Championships, in 1951. He represented New Zealand in seven Davis Cup ties between 1954 and 1961.

He won the Northern Lawn Tennis Singles Championship in 1960 and was runner-up in the singles at the Surrey Grass Court Championships in 1962.
