= Owen Williams (tennis) =

South African tennis player and tournament director (1931–2026)

- Full name: Owen Gordon Williams
- Country (sports): South Africa
- Born: 23 June 1931 Idutywa, Transkei, South Africa
- Died: 9 August 2026 (aged 95) Southampton, New York, U.S.
- Retired: 1959
- Plays: Right-handed

Grand Slam singles results
- Australian Open: 2R (1954)
- Wimbledon: 3R (1955)
- US Open: 4R (1954)

Grand Slam doubles results
- Australian Open: QF (1954)
- Wimbledon: QF (1954)

Grand Slam mixed doubles results
- Australian Open: 2R (1954)
- Wimbledon: QF (1952, 1954)

Owen Gordon Williams (23 June 1931 – 9 August 2026) was a South African tennis player and tournament director.

== Biography ==
Williams was educated at the Selborne College, East London, Eastern Cape.

His best performance at a Grand Slam tournament was reaching the quarterfinals in the men's doubles at the 1954 Australian Championships and 1954 Wimbledon Championships, partnering Abe Segal and Trevor Fancutt respectively. His best singles performance was reaching the fourth round at the 1954 US Championships as the seventh–seeded foreign player. In the fourth round he lost in straight sets to Ham Richardson.

He retired from playing tennis in 1959 at the age of 27. After his playing career he became a tournament director. In the early 1960s he became the tournament director of the South African Tennis Championships. Under his directorship the tournament grew in popularity and stature and became one of the main tournaments on the tour. In early 1969, Williams became Tournament Director of the US Open at Forest Hills, the first full-time director in the tournament's history. That same year the African American tennis player Arthur Ashe requested a visa to participate in the South African Open but was denied by the South African authorities. In the following years he was again refused a visa, but in 1973 his visa application was finally granted and he accepted Williams' invitation to participate in the tournament on the condition that the spectator stands would be racially integrated. Afterwards Ashe and Williams established the Black Tennis Foundation aimed at making tennis accessible to every black child in South Africa. In 1981 Williams was hired as CEO of Lamar Hunt's World Championship Tennis (WCT) circuit and remained in that position until the WCT disbanded in 1990.

In addition to his tennis activities, Williams founded, owned and operated several businesses ventures including distributorships in Scotch whisky, chocolate liqueur and champagne, a sporting goods firm, a small publishing company and a public relations company. As part of the deal to sign Williams for the WCT organization, Lamar Hunt purchased his South African businesses in 1981.

In 1998, Williams partnered with chess player Garry Kasparov to form Sports Management Strategies International in Palm Beach, Florida.

Williams died in Southampton, New York on 9 August 2026, at the age of 95.
