= Doug Reid (tennis) =

Australian tennis player and Thoroughbred racing identity

- Full name: Douglas Hugh Reid
- Country (sports): Australia
- Born: 12 July 1934 Moreland, Victoria
- Died: 27 May 2014 (aged 79) Armadale, Victoria
- Height: 190.5 cm (6 ft 3 in)
- Plays: Right

Grand Slam singles results
- Australian Open: 2R (1956, 1961)
- French Open: 2R (1954)
- Wimbledon: 1R (1954)
- US Open: 1R (1954)

Douglas Hugh Reid, OAM (12 July 1934 – 27 May 2014) was an Australian professional tennis player, influential figure in the Australian horse racing industry, and esteemed member of the Victoria Racing Club (VRC). Reid's contributions to both tennis and horse racing left a lasting impact on the sporting landscape of Australia.

Born 12 July 1934 in Moreland a suburb of Melbourne Victoria, Reid played tennis at Wimbledon in 1954, making the quarter final at Queen’s where he lost to fellow Australian Ken Rosewall that same year. Later Doug Reid along with his brothers Wayne Reid and Jim Reid, John Brown and Frank Sedgman would start professional promotions company Tennis Camps of Australia (TCA) which would go on to establish and run the professional era of the Australian Open Tennis tournament at Kooyong. TCA’s innovation in promotion of the Open would ensure the Tournament’s future success, for example in 1974 cigarette company Marlboro became a naming rights sponsor – a move that was described at the time as “groundbreaking”.

Doug Reid would also have a successful career in the horse racing industry, breeding and racing Champion mare Maybe Mahal who was named the 1977/78 Australian Racehorse of the Year. Trained by Bart Cummings, Maybe Mahal was a dominant sprinter/miler in the late 1970s, winning both handicaps and weight-for-age contests with notable victories that included two Lightning Stakes, a Newmarket Handicap, Craven A Stakes, George Adams Mile, Doomben 10,000 and Doncaster Handicap. Reid also served on the VRC Committee for almost 30 years and in 1996 was awarded an OAM for his services to the racing industry.

Reid served the VRC in many capacities during his 28 years on the Committee including the following positions: - Committee Member of the Australian Stud Book - Chairman of VRC Program Sub-Committee - Chairman of VOBIS - Member of Racing Appeals Board - Chairman Racing Products Pty Ltd. In the racing industry, Reid championed strategic moves that enabled Victorian horse racing to prosper driving boosts to prize money, corporate sponsorship and hospitality packages, slick promotion and significant TV deals. Reid was chief negotiator when the Melbourne Cup become a million-dollar race with sponsorship by Foster's in 1985. With Reid having earlier convinced his fellow VRC Committee members that a live broadcast of the Melbourne Cup carnival in 1978 with ATV-0 would not damage but rather bolster on course attendance.

Reid, most active in competitive tennis during the 1950s, competed at all grand slam tournaments during his career. His only overseas tour was in 1954 and included a first round loss to Ham Richardson at the U.S. national championships. He was later a Victoria Racing Club committee member and bred and raced racehorse Maybe Mahal, Australian Horse of the Year in 1978. His brothers Jim and Wayne were both noted sports administrators.

On 30 May 2014, Douglas Hugh Reid died, leaving behind a legacy that continues to be celebrated in the realms of tennis and horse racing. His expertise, dedication, and profound contributions to the Victoria Racing Club and the Australian sporting community remain respected and cherished. The loss of Reid was mourned by his many friends in the racing world, especially at Flemington, where he had left an indelible mark.
