= Ip Koon Hung =

Hong Kong tennis player

- Country (sports): Hong Kong
- Born: 25 September 1919
- Died: 2007 (aged 87–88)

Singles

Grand Slam singles results
- Wimbledon: 2R (1954)
- US Open: 1R (1947)

Ip Koon Hung (25 September 1919 – 2007) was a Hong Kong tennis player. He was described by the Leeds Intelligencer as a "fluent stylist" with an "inexhaustible supply of tricks".

== Career ==
Ip, who claimed a record 53 Hong Kong major titles, became the first player from the British colony to compete at Wimbledon in 1950. He was runner-up to Nigel Cockburn for the Wimbledon Plate in 1951 and won his first round Wimbledon match in 1954, over Jean-Claude Molinari.

At the Hong Kong National Grass Court Championships, Ip won 15 singles crowns (1947, 1949–1952, 1959–1964). He also won the Hong Kong National Hardcourt Championships ten times (1949, 1952–53, 1955, 1958–60, 1962–64)

Ip won the Malayan Championships in 1949, 1951, 1952 and 1957. He also had success during his tours of Great Britain (1950– 1952). In 1950 he won the Sutton Coldfield Hard Courts Championship. In 1951 he won the title at Chapel Allerton Open, beating Polish veteran Ignacy Tłoczyński in the final.

In 1952 he retained his Chapel Allerton title defeating the Australian player Don Tregonning, and also went on to win the Hoylake and West Kirby Open over Ignacy Tłoczyński. In 1954 he won the singles, men's doubles and mixed doubles titles at the Ulster Grass Court Championships.
