= Jean-Noël Grinda =

French tennis player (born 1936)

- Country (sports): France
- Born: 5 October 1936 (age 88); Paris, France

Singles
- Career record: 317–229
- Career titles: 16

Grand Slam singles results
- Australian Open: 2R (1954, 1965)
- French Open: 3R (1953, 1955, 1958, 1959, 1960, 1962, 1964, 1965)
- Wimbledon: 4R (1959)
- US Open: 1R 1964

Doubles

Grand Slam doubles results
- Australian Open: QF (1965)
- Wimbledon: 3R (1953, 1960)

Mixed doubles

Grand Slam mixed doubles results
- Australian Open: 3R (1965)

Team competitions
- Davis Cup: F^{Eu} (1964)

Jean-Noël Grinda (born 5 October 1936) is a former French international tennis player.

He competed in the Davis Cup a number of times, from 1959 to 1964 and in the Australian Open two times, in 1954 and 1965.

He won the Paris International Championships on clay in 1960 defeating Pierre Darmon and Robert Haillet in the final two rounds.

Grinda belongs to a celebrated Nice family. He married the daughter of fr:Jean Michard-Pellissier. He is today known as a skilled backgammon player.
