= Ashley Cooper (tennis) =

Australian tennis player (1936–2020)

Ashley Cooper AO
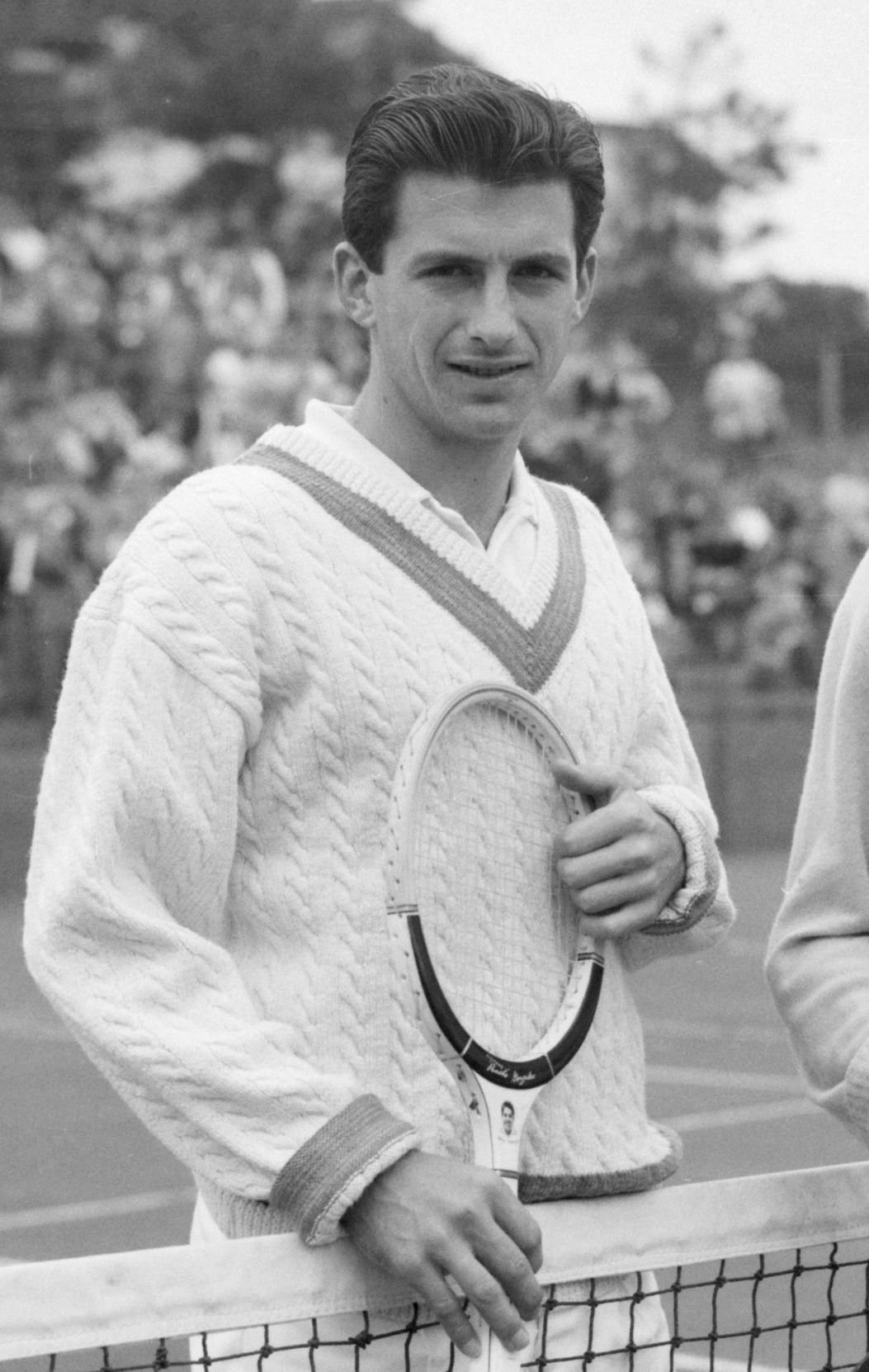
- Cooper in 1958
- Full name: Ashley John Cooper
- Country (sports): Australia
- Residence: Australia
- Born: 15 September 1936 Melbourne, Victoria, Australia
- Died: 22 May 2020 (aged 83)
- Height: 185 cm (6 ft 1 in)
- Turned pro: 1959 (amateur from 1953)
- Retired: 1962
- Plays: Right-handed (one-handed backhand)
- Int. Tennis HoF: 1991 (member page)

Singles
- Career record: 461–261 (63.8%)
- Career titles: 27
- Highest ranking: No. 1 (1957, Lance Tingay)

Grand Slam singles results
- Australian Open: W (1957, 1958)
- French Open: SF (1956, 1957, 1958)
- Wimbledon: W (1958)
- US Open: W (1958)

Other tournaments
- Professional majors
- US Pro: SF (1959, 1960)
- Wembley Pro: QF (1959, 1960, 1961, 1962)
- French Pro: SF (1962)
- Other pro events
- TOC: QF (1959^{FH})

Doubles
- Career record: 0–3
- Highest ranking: No. 1 (1957)

Grand Slam doubles results
- Australian Open: W (1958)
- French Open: W (1957, 1958)
- Wimbledon: F (1958)
- US Open: W (1957)

Team competitions
- Davis Cup: W (1957)

Ashley John Cooper AO (15 September 1936 – 22 May 2020) was an Australian tennis player who played between 1953 and 1968. He was ranked as the world's No. 1 amateur player during the years of 1957 and 1958. (Note: According to Lance Tingay) Cooper won four singles and four doubles titles at Grand Slam tournaments. He won three of the four Grand Slam events in 1958. He turned professional in 1959. Cooper won the Slazenger Professional Championships tournament in 1959. He won the Grand Prix de Europe professional tour of Europe in 1960. Cooper won the European Cup professional tour of Europe in 1962. He retired from tennis play at the end of 1962 due to injury.

== Playing career ==
=== Junior ===
Cooper reached final in 1954 Junior Wimbledon losing to Ramanathan Krishnan in Boys' Singles tournaments.

=== Amateur ===
Cooper won his first Grand Slam singles title at the 1957 Australian Championships where he defeated compatriot Neale Fraser in the final in four sets. He was runner-up at Wimbledon in 1957, losing the final to Lew Hoad. He reached the 1957 U.S. Open final where he lost to Mal Anderson. Cooper was ranked amateur world number one in 1957 by Ned Potter, Lance Tingay, Adrian Quist and Yvon Petra.

Cooper played his best year in 1958, becoming one of only eleven men to win three of the four Grand Slam events in the same year. He successfully defended his Australian singles title after a straight-sets victory in the final against Malcolm Anderson. In July, he won his first and only Wimbledon title after beating Fraser in the final. The pair were roommates at that year's tournament and ate breakfast together on the morning of their match. He followed up with a first singles title at the U.S. Championships, again defeating Anderson in the final. Additionally, Cooper was a semifinalist at the French Championship, losing to Luis Ayala in five sets after leading by 2 sets to love. The defeat prevented him from achieving the Grand Slam that year. It remained the only Major that Cooper did not win in his career. Cooper was ranked world number one amateur in 1958 by Ned Potter and Lance Tingay.

The right-handed Cooper played on the Australian Davis Cup team that won the cup in 1957, and were finalists in 1958.

=== Professional ===
In January 1959, Cooper turned professional after signing a contract with Jack Kramer for a $100,000 guarantee.

Cooper won his first professional match against Pancho Gonzales at Perth on grass in the Ampol world series of tournaments, and defeated Sedgman in the semifinal, but lost the final to Hoad. He finished third on the 1959 World Championship 4-man tour, behind Gonzales and Hoad. Cooper was 18–9 against Mal Anderson on the 4-man tour.

In the fall of 1959, he won the Slazenger Professional tournament at Eastbourne, England on grass, defeating Trabert in the semifinal and Hoad in the final in best-of-five set matches.

Cooper won a professional tour of Europe in 1960, the Grand Prix de Europe series. Cooper finished in first place ahead of (2) Gimeno (3) Segura (4) Anderson (5) Olmedo.

Cooper won the European Cup professional tour of Europe in 1962, with Gimeno again finishing in second place.

Cooper experienced severe nerve damage in his right arm and was forced to retire at the end of 1962.

After retiring as a player, Cooper went on to serve as a tennis player development administrator with Tennis Queensland, where he was based for nearly fifty years. He also sat on the board of directors for Tennis Australia.

== Honours ==
Cooper was inducted into the Sport Australia Hall of Fame in 1987 and the International Tennis Hall of Fame in 1991. In the Queen's Birthday Honours List of 2007, he was appointed an Officer of the Order of Australia (AO) for his service to tennis.

In 2009 Cooper was inducted into the Queensland Sport Hall of Fame.

== Personal life ==
Cooper married Helen Wood, Miss Australia 1957, on 2 January 1959. An estimated crowd of five thousand unruly people surrounded St. Paul's Presbyterian Church in Brisbane to try to catch a glimpse of the couple.

Cooper died on 22 May 2020 at the age of 83 following a long illness.

== Grand Slam finals ==
=== Singles: (4 titles, 2 runners-up) ===
Result	Year	Championship	Surface	Opponent	Score
Win	1957	Australian Championships	Grass	(Australia) Neale Fraser	6–3, 9–11, 6–4, 6–2
Loss	1957	Wimbledon	Grass	(Australia) Lew Hoad	2–6, 1–6, 2–6
Loss	1957	U.S. Championships	Grass	(Australia) Malcolm Anderson	8–10, 5–7, 4–6
Win	1958	Australian Championships	Grass	(Australia) Malcolm Anderson	7–5, 6–3, 6–4
Win	1958	Wimbledon	Grass	(Australia) Neale Fraser	3–6, 6–3, 6–4, 13–11
Win	1958	U.S. Championships	Grass	(Australia) Malcolm Anderson	6–2, 3–6, 4–6, 10–8, 8–6

=== Doubles: (4 titles, 3 runners-up) ===
Result	Year	Championship	Surface	Partner	Opponents	Score
Loss	1956	French Championships	Clay	(Australia) Lew Hoad	(Australia) Don Candy (United States) Robert Perry	5–7, 3–6, 3–6
Loss	1957	Australian Championships	Grass	(Australia) Malcolm Anderson	(Australia) Lew Hoad (Australia) Neale Fraser	3–6, 6–8, 4–6
Win	1957	French Championships	Clay	(Australia) Malcolm Anderson	(Australia) Don Candy (Australia) Mervyn Rose	6–3, 6–0, 6–3
Win	1957	U.S. Championships	Grass	(Australia) Neale Fraser	(United States) Gardnar Mulloy (United States) Budge Patty	4–6, 6–3, 9–7, 6–3
Win	1958	Australian Championships	Grass	(Australia) Neale Fraser	(Australia) Roy Emerson (Australia) Robert Mark	7–5, 6–8, 3–6, 6–3, 7–5
Loss	1958	Wimbledon	Grass	(Australia) Neale Fraser	(Sweden) Sven Davidson (Sweden) Ulf Schmidt	4–6, 4–6, 6–8
Win	1958	French Championships	Clay	(Australia) Neale Fraser	(Australia) Robert Howe (South Africa) Abe Segal	3–6, 8–6, 6–3, 7–5

== Performance timeline ==
Source of Grand Slam results:

Key
W	F	SF	QF	#R	RR	Q#	DNQ	A	NH

(W) winner; (F) finalist; (SF) semifinalist; (QF) quarterfinalist; (#R) rounds 4, 3, 2, 1; (RR) round-robin stage; (Q#) qualification round; (DNQ) did not qualify; (A) absent; (NH) not held; (SR) strike rate (events won / competed); (W–L) win–loss record.

=== Singles ===
	1954		1955	1956	1957	1958	1959	1960	1961	1962	1963	1964	1965	1966	1967	1968	SR	W–L	Win %
Grand Slam tournaments																	4 / 20	69–15	82.1
Australian Open	QF		QF	QF	W	W	A	A	A	A	A	A	A	A	A	A	2 / 5	16–3	84.2
French Open	2R		A	SF	SF	SF	A	A	A	A	A	A	A	A	A	2R	0 / 5	14–4	77.8
Wimbledon	4R		1R	4R	F	W	A	A	A	A	A	A	A	A	A	A	1 / 5	19–4	82.6
US Open	2R		3R	QF	F	W	A	A	A	A	A	A	A	A	A	A	1 / 5	20–4	83.3
Pro Slam tournaments																	0 / 10	10–10	50.0
U.S. Pro	A	A	A	A	A	A	SF	SF	A	A	A	A	A	A	A		0 / 2	1–2	33.3
French Pro	NH		NH	A	NH	A	QF	QF	QF	SF	A	A	A	A	A		0 / 4	5–4	55.6
Wembley Pro	NH		NH	A	A	A	QF	QF	QF	QF	A	A	A	A	A		0 / 4	4–4	50.0
Win–loss	7–4		4–3	14–4	21–3	23–1	3–3	2–3	2–2	3–2	0–0	0–0	0–0	0–0	0–0	0–0	4 / 30	79–25	76.0
