= List of Australian Open champions =

The following is a list of Australian Open champions in tennis:

== Champions ==
=== Senior ===
Year	Singles		Doubles		
Year	Men	Women	Men	Women	Mixed
1905	(Australia) Rodney Heath	No competition	(United Kingdom) Randolph Lycett (Australia) Tom Tachell	No competition	No competition
1906	(New Zealand) Anthony Wilding	No competition	(Australia) Rodney Heath (New Zealand) Anthony Wilding	No competition	No competition
1907	(Australia) Horace Rice	No competition	(Australia) William Gregg (New Zealand) Harry Parker	No competition	No competition
1908	(United States) Fred Alexander	No competition	(United States) Fred Alexander (Australia) Alfred Dunlop	No competition	No competition
1909	(New Zealand) Anthony Wilding	No competition	(Australia) J. P. Keane (Australia) Ernie Parker	No competition	No competition
1910	(Australia) Rodney Heath	No competition	(Australia) Ashley Campbell (Australia) Horace Rice	No competition	No competition
1911	(Australia) Norman Brookes	No competition	(Australia) Rodney Heath (United Kingdom) Randolph Lycett	No competition	No competition
1912	(United Kingdom) James Cecil Parke	No competition	(United Kingdom) James Cecil Parke (United Kingdom) Charles Dixon	No competition	No competition
1913	(Australia) Ernie Parker	No competition	(Australia) Alf Hedeman (Australia) Ernie Parker	No competition	No competition
1914	(Australia) Arthur O'Hara Wood	No competition	(Australia) Ashley Campbell (Australia) Gerald Patterson	No competition	No competition
1915	(United Kingdom) Francis Lowe	No competition	(Australia) Horace Rice (Australia) Clarence V. Todd	No competition	No competition
1916	No tournament due to World War I				
1917	No tournament due to World War I				
1918	No tournament due to World War I				
1919	(United Kingdom) Algernon Kingscote	No competition	(Australia) Pat O'Hara Wood (Australia) Ron Thomas (x2)	No competition	No competition
1920	(Australia) Pat O'Hara Wood	No competition	(Australia) Pat O'Hara Wood (Australia) Ron Thomas (x2)	No competition	No competition
1921	(Australia) Rhys Gemmell	No competition	(Australia) Stanley H. Eaton (Australia) Rice Gemmell	No competition	No competition
1922	(Australia) James Anderson	(Australia) Margaret Molesworth (x2)	(Australia) Jack Hawkes (Australia) Gerald Patterson	(Australia) Esna Boyd Robertson (Australia) Marjorie Mountain	(Australia) Esna Boyd Robertson (Australia) Jack Hawkes
1923	(Australia) Pat O'Hara Wood	(Australia) Margaret Molesworth (x2)	(Australia) Pat O'Hara Wood (Australia) Bert St. John	(Australia) Esna Boyd Robertson (Australia) Sylvia Lance Harper	(Australia) Sylvia Lance Harper (Australia) Horace Rice
1924	(Australia) James Anderson (x2)	(Australia) Sylvia Lance Harper	(Australia) James Anderson (Australia) Norman Brookes	(Australia) Daphne Akhurst Cozens (Australia) Sylvia Lance Harper (x2)	(Australia) Daphne Akhurst Cozens (Australia) Jim Willard (x2)
1925	(Australia) James Anderson (x2)	(Australia) Daphne Akhurst (x2)	(Australia) Pat O'Hara Wood (Australia) Gerald Patterson	(Australia) Daphne Akhurst Cozens (Australia) Sylvia Lance Harper (x2)	(Australia) Daphne Akhurst Cozens (Australia) Jim Willard (x2)
1926	(Australia) John Hawkes	(Australia) Daphne Akhurst (x2)	(Australia) Jack Hawkes (Australia) Gerald Patterson (x2)	(Australia) Esna Boyd Robertson (Australia) Meryl O'Hara Wood	(Australia) Esna Boyd Robertson (Australia) Jack Hawkes (x2)
1927	(Australia) Gerald Patterson	(Australia) Esna Boyd Robertson	(Australia) Jack Hawkes (Australia) Gerald Patterson (x2)	(Australia) Louie Bickerton (Australia) Meryl O'Hara Wood	(Australia) Esna Boyd Robertson (Australia) Jack Hawkes (x2)
1928	(France) Jean Borotra	(Australia) Daphne Akhurst (x3)	(France) Jean Borotra (France) Jacques Brugnon	(Australia) Daphne Akhurst Cozens (Australia) Esna Boyd Robertson	(Australia) Daphne Akhurst Cozens (France) Jean Borotra
1929	(United Kingdom) John Gregory	(Australia) Daphne Akhurst (x3)	(Australia) Jack Crawford (Australia) Harry Hopman (x2)	(Australia) Daphne Akhurst Cozens (Australia) Louie Bickerton	(Australia) Daphne Akhurst Cozens (Australia) Edgar Moon
1930	(Australia) Edgar Moon	(Australia) Daphne Akhurst (x3)	(Australia) Jack Crawford (Australia) Harry Hopman (x2)	(Australia) Mall Molesworth (Australia) Emily Hood Westacott	(Australia) Nell Hall Hopman (Australia) Harry Hopman
1931	(Australia) Jack Crawford (x3)	(Australia) Coral McInnes Buttsworth (x2)	(Australia) Charles Donohoe (Australia) Ray Dunlop	(Australia) Louie Bickerton (Australia) Daphne Akhurst Cozens	(Australia) Marjorie Cox Crawford (Australia) Jack Crawford (x3)
1932	(Australia) Jack Crawford (x3)	(Australia) Coral McInnes Buttsworth (x2)	(Australia) Jack Crawford (Australia) Edgar Moon	(Australia) Coral McInnes Buttsworth (Australia) Marjorie Cox Crawford	(Australia) Marjorie Cox Crawford (Australia) Jack Crawford (x3)
1933	(Australia) Jack Crawford (x3)	(Australia) Joan Hartigan (x2)	(United States) Keith Gledhill (United States) Ellsworth Vines	(Australia) Mall Molesworth (Australia) Emily Hood Westacott (x2)	(Australia) Marjorie Cox Crawford (Australia) Jack Crawford (x3)
1934	(United Kingdom) Fred Perry	(Australia) Joan Hartigan (x2)	(United Kingdom) Pat Hughes (United Kingdom) Fred Perry	(Australia) Mall Molesworth (Australia) Emily Hood Westacott (x2)	(Australia) Joan Hartigan Bathurst (Australia) Edgar Moon
1935	(Australia) Jack Crawford	(United Kingdom) Dorothy Round	(Australia) Jack Crawford (Australia) Vivian McGrath	(United Kingdom) Evelyn Dearman (United Kingdom) Nancy Lyle	(Australia) Louise Bickerton (France) Christian Boussus
1936	(Australia) Adrian Quist	(Australia) Joan Hartigan	(Australia) Adrian Quist (Australia) Don Turnbull (x2)	(Australia) Thelma Coyne Long (Australia) Nancye Wynne Bolton (x5)	(Australia) Nell Hall Hopman (Australia) Harry Hopman (x2)
1937	(Australia) Vivian McGrath	(Australia) Nancye Wynne	(Australia) Adrian Quist (Australia) Don Turnbull (x2)	(Australia) Thelma Coyne Long (Australia) Nancye Wynne Bolton (x5)	(Australia) Nell Hall Hopman (Australia) Harry Hopman (x2)
1938	(United States) Don Budge	(United States) Dorothy Bundy Cheney	(Australia) John Bromwich (Australia) Adrian Quist (x3)	(Australia) Thelma Coyne Long (Australia) Nancye Wynne Bolton (x5)	(Australia) Margaret Wilson (Australia) John Bromwich
1939	(Australia) John Bromwich	(Australia) Emily Hood Westacott	(Australia) John Bromwich (Australia) Adrian Quist (x3)	(Australia) Thelma Coyne Long (Australia) Nancye Wynne Bolton (x5)	(Australia) Nell Hall Hopman (Australia) Harry Hopman
1940	(Australia) Adrian Quist	(Australia) Nancye Wynne Bolton	(Australia) John Bromwich (Australia) Adrian Quist (x3)	(Australia) Thelma Coyne Long (Australia) Nancye Wynne Bolton (x5)	(Australia) Nancye Wynne Bolton (Australia) Colin Long
1941	No tournament due to World War II				
1942	No tournament due to World War II				
1943	No tournament due to World War II				
1944	No tournament due to World War II				
1945	No tournament due to World War II				
1946	(Australia) John Bromwich	(Australia) Nancye Wynne Bolton (x3)	(Australia) John Bromwich (Australia) Adrian Quist (x5)	(Australia) Joyce Fitch (Australia) Mary Bevis Hawton	(Australia) Nancye Wynne Bolton (Australia) Colin Long (x3)
1947	(Australia) Dinny Pails	(Australia) Nancye Wynne Bolton (x3)	(Australia) John Bromwich (Australia) Adrian Quist (x5)	(Australia) Thelma Coyne Long (Australia) Nancye Wynne Bolton (x3)	(Australia) Nancye Wynne Bolton (Australia) Colin Long (x3)
1948	(Australia) Adrian Quist	(Australia) Nancye Wynne Bolton (x3)	(Australia) John Bromwich (Australia) Adrian Quist (x5)	(Australia) Thelma Coyne Long (Australia) Nancye Wynne Bolton (x3)	(Australia) Nancye Wynne Bolton (Australia) Colin Long (x3)
1949	(Australia) Frank Sedgman (x2)	(United States) Doris Hart	(Australia) John Bromwich (Australia) Adrian Quist (x5)	(Australia) Thelma Coyne Long (Australia) Nancye Wynne Bolton (x3)	(United States) Doris Hart (Australia) Frank Sedgman (x2)
1950	(Australia) Frank Sedgman (x2)	(United States) Louise Brough	(Australia) John Bromwich (Australia) Adrian Quist (x5)	(United States) Louise Brough Clapp (United States) Doris Hart	(United States) Doris Hart (Australia) Frank Sedgman (x2)
1951	(United States) Richard Savitt	(Australia) Nancye Wynne Bolton	(Australia) Frank Sedgman (Australia) Ken McGregor (x2)	(Australia) Thelma Coyne Long (Australia) Nancye Wynne Bolton (x2)	(Australia) Thelma Coyne Long (Australia) George Worthington (x2)
1952	(Australia) Ken McGregor	(Australia) Thelma Coyne Long	(Australia) Frank Sedgman (Australia) Ken McGregor (x2)	(Australia) Thelma Coyne Long (Australia) Nancye Wynne Bolton (x2)	(Australia) Thelma Coyne Long (Australia) George Worthington (x2)
1953	(Australia) Ken Rosewall	(United States) Maureen Connolly	(Australia) Lew Hoad (Australia) Ken Rosewall	(United States) Maureen Connolly (United States) Julia Sampson	(United States) Julia Sampson Hayward (Australia) Rex Hartwig
1954	(Australia) Mervyn Rose	(Australia) Thelma Coyne Long	(Australia) Mervyn Rose (Australia) Rex Hartwig	(Australia) Mary Bevis Hawton (Australia) Beryl Penrose	(Australia) Thelma Coyne Long (Australia) Rex Hartwig
1955	(Australia) Ken Rosewall	(Australia) Beryl Penrose	(United States) Vic Seixas (United States) Tony Trabert	(Australia) Mary Bevis Hawton (Australia) Beryl Penrose	(Australia) Thelma Coyne Long (Australia) George Worthington
1956	(Australia) Lew Hoad	(Australia) Mary Carter Reitano	(Australia) Lew Hoad (Australia) Ken Rosewall	(Australia) Mary Bevis Hawton (Australia) Thelma Coyne Long	(Australia) Beryl Penrose (Australia) Neale Fraser
1957	(Australia) Ashley Cooper (x2)	(United States) Shirley Fry	(Australia) Neale Fraser (Australia) Lew Hoad	(United States) Althea Gibson (United States) Shirley Fry Irvin	(Australia) Fay Muller (Australia) Mal Anderson
1958	(Australia) Ashley Cooper (x2)	(United Kingdom) Angela Mortimer	(Australia) Ashley Cooper (Australia) Neale Fraser	(Australia) Mary Bevis Hawton (Australia) Thelma Coyne Long	(Australia) Mary Bevis Hawton (Australia) Bob Howe
1959	(United States) Alex Olmedo	(Australia) Mary Carter Reitano	(Australia) Rod Laver (Australia) Bob Mark (x3)	(South Africa) Renée Schuurman (South Africa) Sandra Reynolds Price	(South Africa) Sandra Reynolds Price (Australia) Bob Mark
1960	(Australia) Rod Laver	(Australia) Margaret Smith Court (x7)	(Australia) Rod Laver (Australia) Bob Mark (x3)	(Brazil) Maria Bueno (United Kingdom) Christine Truman Janes	(Australia) Jan Lehane O'Neill (South Africa) Trevor Fancutt
1961	(Australia) Roy Emerson	(Australia) Margaret Smith Court (x7)	(Australia) Rod Laver (Australia) Bob Mark (x3)	(Australia) Mary Carter Reitano (Australia) Margaret Court	(Australia) Jan Lehane O'Neill (Australia) Bob Hewitt
1962	(Australia) Rod Laver	(Australia) Margaret Smith Court (x7)	(Australia) Roy Emerson (Australia) Neale Fraser	(Australia) Margaret Court (Australia) Robyn Ebbern (x2)	(Australia) Lesley Turner Bowrey (Australia) Fred Stolle
1963	(Australia) Roy Emerson (x5)	(Australia) Margaret Smith Court (x7)	(Australia) Bob Hewitt (Australia) Fred Stolle (x2)	(Australia) Margaret Court (Australia) Robyn Ebbern (x2)	(Australia) Margaret Smith Court (Australia) Ken Fletcher (x2)
1964	(Australia) Roy Emerson (x5)	(Australia) Margaret Smith Court (x7)	(Australia) Bob Hewitt (Australia) Fred Stolle (x2)	(Australia) Judy Tegart-Dalton (Australia) Lesley Turner Bowrey	(Australia) Margaret Smith Court (Australia) Ken Fletcher (x2)
1965	(Australia) Roy Emerson (x5)	(Australia) Margaret Smith Court (x7)	(Australia) John Newcombe (Australia) Tony Roche	(Australia) Margaret Court (Australia) Lesley Turner Bowrey	(Australia) Robyn Ebbern (Australia) Owen Davidson and (Australia) Margaret Smith Court (Australia) John Newcombe
1966	(Australia) Roy Emerson (x5)	(Australia) Margaret Smith Court (x7)	(Australia) Roy Emerson (Australia) Fred Stolle	(United States) Carole Caldwell Graebner (United States) Nancy Richey	(Australia) Judy Tegart-Dalton (Australia) Tony Roche
1967	(Australia) Roy Emerson (x5)	(United States) Nancy Richey	(Australia) John Newcombe (Australia) Tony Roche	(Australia) Lesley Turner Bowrey (Australia) Judy Tegart-Dalton	(Australia) Lesley Turner Bowrey (Australia) Owen Davidson
1968	(Australia) Bill Bowrey	(United States) Billie Jean Moffitt King	(Australia) Dick Crealy (Australia) Allan Stone	(Australia) Karen Krantzcke (Australia) Kerry Melville Reid	(United States) Billie Jean King (Australia) Dick Crealy
1969	↓ Open Era ↓				
1969	(Australia) Rod Laver	(Australia) Margaret Court (x3)	(Australia) Roy Emerson (Australia) Rod Laver	(Australia) Margaret Court (Australia) Judy Tegart (x2)	(United Kingdom) Ann Haydon (Australia) Frederick Stolle and (Australia) Margaret Court (United States) Marty Riessen
1970	(United States) Arthur Ashe	(Australia) Margaret Court (x3)	(United States) Robert Lutz (United States) Stan Smith	(Australia) Margaret Court (Australia) Judy Tegart (x2)	No competition
1971	(Australia) Ken Rosewall (x2)	(Australia) Margaret Court (x3)	(Australia) John Newcombe (Australia) Tony Roche	(Australia) Evonne Goolagong Cawley (Australia) Margaret Court	No competition
1972	(Australia) Ken Rosewall (x2)	(United Kingdom) Virginia Wade	(Australia) Owen Davidson (Australia) Ken Rosewall	(Australia) Kerry Harris (Australia) Helen Gourlay Cawley	No competition
1973	(Australia) John Newcombe	(Australia) Margaret Court	(Australia) Malcolm Anderson (Australia) John Newcombe	(Australia) Margaret Court (United Kingdom) Virginia Wade	No competition
1974	(United States) Jimmy Connors	(Australia) Evonne Goolagong Cawley (x3)	(Australia) Ross Case (Australia) Geoff Masters	(Australia) Evonne Goolagong Cawley (United States) Peggy Michel (x2)	No competition
1975	(Australia) John Newcombe	(Australia) Evonne Goolagong Cawley (x3)	(Australia) John Alexander (Australia) Phil Dent	(Australia) Evonne Goolagong Cawley (United States) Peggy Michel (x2)	No competition
1976	(Australia) Mark Edmondson	(Australia) Evonne Goolagong Cawley (x3)	(Australia) John Newcombe (Australia) Tony Roche	(Australia) Evonne Goolagong Cawley (Australia) Helen Gourlay Cawley	No competition
1977^{Jan}	(United States) Roscoe Tanner	(Australia) Kerry Melville Reid	(Australia) Ray Ruffels (Australia) Allan Stone	(Australia) Dianne Fromholtz Balestrat (Australia) Helen Gourlay Cawley	No competition
1977^{Dec}	(United States) Vitas Gerulaitis	(Australia) Evonne Goolagong Cawley	(United States) Arthur Ashe (Australia) Tony Roche	(Australia) Evonne Goolagong Cawley (Australia) Helen Gourlay Cawley and (United States) Mona Guerrant (Australia) Kerry Melville Reid	No competition
1978	(Argentina) Guillermo Vilas (x2)	(Australia) Chris O'Neil	(Poland) Wojciech Fibak (Australia) Kim Warwick	(United States) Betsy Nagelsen (Czechoslovakia) Renáta Tomanová	No competition
1979	(Argentina) Guillermo Vilas (x2)	(United States) Barbara Jordan	(Australia) Peter McNamara (Australia) Paul McNamee	(New Zealand) Judy Chaloner (Australia) Diane Evers	No competition
1980	(United States) Brian Teacher	(Czechoslovakia) Hana Mandlíková	(Australia) Mark Edmondson (Australia) Kim Warwick	(United States) Betsy Nagelsen (United States) Martina Navratilova	No competition
1981	(South Africa) Johan Kriek (x2)	(United States) Martina Navratilova	(Australia) Mark Edmondson (Australia) Kim Warwick	(United States) Kathy Jordan (United States) Anne Smith	No competition
1982	(South Africa) Johan Kriek (x2)	(United States) Chris Evert	(Australia) John Alexander (Australia) John Fitzgerald	(United States) Martina Navratilova (United States) Pam Shriver (x4)	No competition
1983	(Sweden) Mats Wilander (x2)	(United States) Martina Navratilova	(Australia) Mark Edmondson (Australia) Paul McNamee	(United States) Martina Navratilova (United States) Pam Shriver (x4)	No competition
1984	(Sweden) Mats Wilander (x2)	(United States) Chris Evert	(Australia) Mark Edmondson (United States) Sherwood Stewart	(United States) Martina Navratilova (United States) Pam Shriver (x4)	No competition
1985	(Sweden) Stefan Edberg	(United States) Martina Navratilova	(United States) Paul Annacone (South Africa) Christo van Rensburg	(United States) Martina Navratilova (United States) Pam Shriver (x4)	No competition
1986	No tournament				
1987	(Sweden) Stefan Edberg	(Czechoslovakia) Hana Mandlíková	(Sweden) Stefan Edberg (Sweden) Anders Järryd	(United States) Martina Navratilova (United States) Pam Shriver (x3)	(United States) Zina Garrison (United States) Sherwood Stewart
1988	(Sweden) Mats Wilander	(West Germany) Steffi Graf (x3)	(United States) Rick Leach (United States) Jim Pugh (x2)	(United States) Martina Navratilova (United States) Pam Shriver (x3)	(Czechoslovakia) Jana Novotná (United States) Jim Pugh (x2)
1989	(Czech Republic) Ivan Lendl (x2)	(West Germany) Steffi Graf (x3)	(United States) Rick Leach (United States) Jim Pugh (x2)	(United States) Martina Navratilova (United States) Pam Shriver (x3)	(Czechoslovakia) Jana Novotná (United States) Jim Pugh (x2)
1990	(Czech Republic) Ivan Lendl (x2)	(West Germany) Steffi Graf (x3)	(South Africa) Pieter Aldrich (South Africa) Danie Visser	(Czechoslovakia) Jana Novotná (Czechoslovakia) Helena Suková	(Soviet Union) Natasha Zvereva (United States) Jim Pugh
1991	(Germany) Boris Becker	(Socialist Federal Republic of Yugoslavia) / (Federal Republic of Yugoslavia) Monica Seles (x3)	(United States) Scott Davis (United States) David Pate	(United States) Patty Fendick (United States) Mary Joe Fernández	(United Kingdom) Jo Durie (United Kingdom) Jeremy Bates
1992	(United States) Jim Courier (x2)	(Socialist Federal Republic of Yugoslavia) / (Federal Republic of Yugoslavia) Monica Seles (x3)	(Australia) Todd Woodbridge (Australia) Mark Woodforde	(Spain) Arantxa Sánchez (Czechoslovakia) Helena Suková	(Australia) Nicole Provis (Australia) Mark Woodforde
1993	(United States) Jim Courier (x2)	(Socialist Federal Republic of Yugoslavia) / (Federal Republic of Yugoslavia) Monica Seles (x3)	(South Africa) Danie Visser (Australia) Laurie Warder	(United States) Gigi Fernández (Belarus) Natasha Zvereva (x2)	(Spain) Arantxa Sánchez (Australia) Todd Woodbridge
1994	(United States) Pete Sampras	(Germany) Steffi Graf	(Netherlands) Jacco Eltingh (Netherlands) Paul Haarhuis	(United States) Gigi Fernández (Belarus) Natasha Zvereva (x2)	(Latvia) Larisa Savchenko (Russia) Andrei Olhovskiy
1995	(United States) Andre Agassi	(France) Mary Pierce	(United States) Jared Palmer (United States) Richey Reneberg	(Czech Republic) Jana Novotná (Spain) Arantxa Sánchez	(Belarus) Natasha Zvereva (United States) Rick Leach
1996	(Germany) Boris Becker	(United States) Monica Seles	(Sweden) Stefan Edberg (Czech Republic) Petr Korda	(United States) Chanda Rubin (Spain) Arantxa Sánchez	(Latvia) Larisa Savchenko (Australia) Mark Woodforde
1997	(United States) Pete Sampras	(Switzerland) Martina Hingis (x3)	(Australia) Todd Woodbridge (Australia) Mark Woodforde	(Switzerland) Martina Hingis (Belarus) Natasha Zvereva	(Netherlands) Manon Bollegraf (United States) Rick Leach
1998	(Czech Republic) Petr Korda	(Switzerland) Martina Hingis (x3)	(Sweden) Jonas Björkman (Netherlands) Jacco Eltingh	(Switzerland) Martina Hingis (Croatia) Mirjana Lučić	(United States) Venus Williams (United States) Justin Gimelstob
1999	(Russia) Yevgeny Kafelnikov	(Switzerland) Martina Hingis (x3)	(Sweden) Jonas Björkman (Australia) Patrick Rafter	(Switzerland) Martina Hingis (Russia) Anna Kournikova	(South Africa) Mariaan de Swardt (South Africa) David Adams
2000	(United States) Andre Agassi (x2)	(United States) Lindsay Davenport	(South Africa) Ellis Ferreira (United States) Rick Leach	(United States) Lisa Raymond (Australia) Rennae Stubbs	(Australia) Rennae Stubbs (United States) Jared Palmer
2001	(United States) Andre Agassi (x2)	(United States) Jennifer Capriati (x2)	(Sweden) Jonas Björkman (Australia) Todd Woodbridge	(United States) Serena Williams (United States) Venus Williams	(United States) Corina Morariu (South Africa) Ellis Ferreira
2002	(Sweden) Thomas Johansson	(United States) Jennifer Capriati (x2)	(The Bahamas) Mark Knowles (Canada) Daniel Nestor	(Switzerland) Martina Hingis (Russia) Anna Kournikova	(Slovakia) Daniela Hantuchová (Zimbabwe) Kevin Ullyett
2003	(United States) Andre Agassi	(United States) Serena Williams	(France) Michaël Llodra (France) Fabrice Santoro (x2)	(United States) Serena Williams (United States) Venus Williams	(United States) Martina Navratilova (India) Leander Paes
2004	(Switzerland) Roger Federer	(Belgium) Justine Henin	(France) Michaël Llodra (France) Fabrice Santoro (x2)	(Spain) Virginia Ruano Pascual (Argentina) Paola Suárez	(Russia) Elena Bovina (Serbia and Montenegro) Nenad Zimonjić
2005	(Russia) Marat Safin	(United States) Serena Williams	(Zimbabwe) Wayne Black (Zimbabwe) Kevin Ullyett	(Russia) Svetlana Kuznetsova (Australia) Alicia Molik	(Australia) Samantha Stosur (Australia) Scott Draper
2006	(Switzerland) Roger Federer (x2)	(France) Amélie Mauresmo	(United States) Bob Bryan (United States) Mike Bryan (x2)	(China) Yan Zi (China) Zheng Jie	(Switzerland) Martina Hingis (India) Mahesh Bhupathi
2007	(Switzerland) Roger Federer (x2)	(United States) Serena Williams	(United States) Bob Bryan (United States) Mike Bryan (x2)	(Zimbabwe) Cara Black (South Africa) Liezel Huber	(Russia) Elena Likhovtseva (Canada) Daniel Nestor
2008	(Serbia) Novak Djokovic	(Russia) Maria Sharapova	(Israel) Jonathan Erlich (Israel) Andy Ram	(Ukraine) Alona Bondarenko (Ukraine) Kateryna Bondarenko	(China) Sun Tiantian (Serbia) Nenad Zimonjić
2009	(Spain) Rafael Nadal	(United States) Serena Williams (x2)	(United States) Bob Bryan (United States) Mike Bryan (x3)	(United States) Serena Williams (United States) Venus Williams (x2)	(India) Sania Mirza (India) Mahesh Bhupathi
2010	(Switzerland) Roger Federer	(United States) Serena Williams (x2)	(United States) Bob Bryan (United States) Mike Bryan (x3)	(United States) Serena Williams (United States) Venus Williams (x2)	(Zimbabwe) Cara Black (India) Leander Paes
2011	(Serbia) Novak Djokovic (x3)	(Belgium) Kim Clijsters	(United States) Bob Bryan (United States) Mike Bryan (x3)	(Argentina) Gisela Dulko (Italy) Flavia Pennetta	(Slovenia) Katarina Srebotnik (Canada) Daniel Nestor
2012	(Serbia) Novak Djokovic (x3)	(Belarus) Victoria Azarenka (x2)	(India) Leander Paes (Czech Republic) Radek Štěpánek	(Russia) Svetlana Kuznetsova (Russia) Vera Zvonareva	(United States) Bethanie Mattek-Sands (Romania) Horia Tecău
2013	(Serbia) Novak Djokovic (x3)	(Belarus) Victoria Azarenka (x2)	(United States) Bob Bryan (United States) Mike Bryan	(Italy) Sara Errani (Italy) Roberta Vinci (x2)	(Australia) Jarmila Gajdošová (Australia) Matthew Ebden
2014	(Switzerland) Stan Wawrinka	(China) Li Na	(Poland) Łukasz Kubot (Sweden) Robert Lindstedt	(Italy) Sara Errani (Italy) Roberta Vinci (x2)	(France) Kristina Mladenovic (Canada) Daniel Nestor
2015	(Serbia) Novak Djokovic (x2)	(United States) Serena Williams	(Italy) Simone Bolelli (Italy) Fabio Fognini	(United States) Bethanie Mattek-Sands (Czech Republic) Lucie Šafářová	(Switzerland) Martina Hingis (India) Leander Paes
2016	(Serbia) Novak Djokovic (x2)	(Germany) Angelique Kerber	(United Kingdom) Jamie Murray (Brazil) Bruno Soares	(Switzerland) Martina Hingis (India) Sania Mirza	(Russia) Elena Vesnina (Brazil) Bruno Soares
2017	(Switzerland) Roger Federer (x2)	(United States) Serena Williams	(Finland) Henri Kontinen (Australia) John Peers	(United States) Bethanie Mattek-Sands (Czech Republic) Lucie Šafářová	(United States) Abigail Spears (Colombia) Juan Sebastián Cabal
2018	(Switzerland) Roger Federer (x2)	(Denmark) Caroline Wozniacki	(Austria) Oliver Marach (Croatia) Mate Pavić	(Hungary) Tímea Babos (France) Kristina Mladenovic	(Canada) Gabriela Dabrowski (Croatia) Mate Pavić
2019	(Serbia) Novak Djokovic (x3)	(Japan) Naomi Osaka	(France) Pierre-Hugues Herbert (France) Nicolas Mahut	(Australia) Samantha Stosur (China) Zhang Shuai	(Czech Republic) Barbora Krejčíková (United States) Rajeev Ram
2020	(Serbia) Novak Djokovic (x3)	(United States) Sofia Kenin	(United States) Rajeev Ram (United Kingdom) Joe Salisbury	(Hungary) Tímea Babos (France) Kristina Mladenovic	(Czech Republic) Barbora Krejčiková (Croatia) Nikola Mektić
2021	(Serbia) Novak Djokovic (x3)	(Japan) Naomi Osaka	(Croatia) Ivan Dodig (Slovakia) Filip Polášek	(Belgium) Elise Mertens (Belarus) Aryna Sabalenka	(Czech Republic) Barbora Krejčiková (United States) Rajeev Ram
2022	(Spain) Rafael Nadal	(Australia) Ashleigh Barty	(Australia) Thanasi Kokkinakis (Australia) Nick Kyrgios	(Czech Republic) Barbora Krejčiková (Czech Republic) Kateřina Siniaková (x2)	(France) Kristina Mladenovic (Croatia) Ivan Dodig
2023	(Serbia) Novak Djokovic	(Note: On 1 March 2022, the WTA announced that players from Russia and Belarus would not be allowed to compete under the name or flag of Russia or Belarus following the 2022 Russian invasion of Ukraine.) Aryna Sabalenka (x2)	(Australia) Rinky Hijikata (Australia) Jason Kubler	(Czech Republic) Barbora Krejčiková (Czech Republic) Kateřina Siniaková (x2)	(Brazil) Luisa Stefani (Brazil) Rafael Matos
2024	(Italy) Jannik Sinner (x2)	Aryna Sabalenka (x2)	(India) Rohan Bopanna (Australia) Matthew Ebden	(Chinese Taipei) Hsieh Su-wei (Belgium) Elise Mertens	(Chinese Taipei) Hsieh Su-wei (Poland) Jan Zieliński
2025	(Italy) Jannik Sinner (x2)	(United States) Madison Keys	(Finland) Harri Heliövaara (United Kingdom) Henry Patten	(Czech Republic) Kateřina Siniaková (United States) Taylor Townsend	(Australia) Olivia Gadecki (Australia) John Peers (x2)
2026	(Spain) Carlos Alcaraz	(Kazakhstan) Elena Rybakina	(United States) Christian Harrison (United Kingdom) Neal Skupski	(Belgium) Elise Mertens (China) Zhang Shuai	(Australia) Olivia Gadecki (Australia) John Peers (x2)

=== Wheelchair ===
Year	Singles			Doubles		
Year	Men	Women	Quad	Men	Women	Quad
2002	(Netherlands) Robin Ammerlaan	(Netherlands) Esther Vergeer (x3)	No competition	No competition	No competition	No competition
2003	(Australia) David Hall (x3)	(Netherlands) Esther Vergeer (x3)	No competition	No competition	No competition	No competition
2004	(Australia) David Hall (x3)	(Netherlands) Esther Vergeer (x3)	No competition	(Netherlands) Robin Ammerlaan (Austria) Martin Legner (x3)	(Netherlands) Maaike Smit (Netherlands) Esther Vergeer	No competition
2005	(Australia) David Hall (x3)	(Japan) Mie Yaosa	No competition	(Netherlands) Robin Ammerlaan (Austria) Martin Legner (x3)	(France) Florence Gravellier (Netherlands) Maaike Smit	No competition
2006	(France) Michaël Jérémiasz	(Netherlands) Esther Vergeer (x4)	No competition	(Netherlands) Robin Ammerlaan (Austria) Martin Legner (x3)	(Netherlands) Jiske Griffioen (Netherlands) Esther Vergeer (x3)	No competition
2007	(Japan) Shingo Kunieda (x5)	(Netherlands) Esther Vergeer (x4)	No competition	(Netherlands) Robin Ammerlaan (Japan) Shingo Kunieda	(Netherlands) Jiske Griffioen (Netherlands) Esther Vergeer (x3)	No competition
2008	(Japan) Shingo Kunieda (x5)	(Netherlands) Esther Vergeer (x4)	(United Kingdom) Peter Norfolk (x3)	(Japan) Shingo Kunieda (Japan) Satoshi Saida	(Netherlands) Jiske Griffioen (Netherlands) Esther Vergeer (x3)	(United States) Nick Taylor (United States) David Wagner (x3)
2009	(Japan) Shingo Kunieda (x5)	(Netherlands) Esther Vergeer (x4)	(United Kingdom) Peter Norfolk (x3)	(Netherlands) Robin Ammerlaan (Japan) Shingo Kunieda	(Netherlands) Korie Homan (Netherlands) Esther Vergeer	(United States) Nick Taylor (United States) David Wagner (x3)
2010	(Japan) Shingo Kunieda (x5)	(Netherlands) Korie Homan	(United Kingdom) Peter Norfolk (x3)	(France) Stéphane Houdet (Japan) Shingo Kunieda	(France) Florence Gravellier (Netherlands) Aniek van Koot	(United States) Nick Taylor (United States) David Wagner (x3)
2011	(Japan) Shingo Kunieda (x5)	(Netherlands) Esther Vergeer (x2)	(United States) David Wagner	(Japan) Shingo Kunieda (Netherlands) Maikel Scheffers	(Netherlands) Esther Vergeer (Netherlands) Sharon Walraven (x2)	(United Kingdom) Andy Lapthorne (United Kingdom) Peter Norfolk (x2)
2012	(Netherlands) Maikel Scheffers	(Netherlands) Esther Vergeer (x2)	(United Kingdom) Peter Norfolk	(Netherlands) Robin Ammerlaan (Netherlands) Ronald Vink	(Netherlands) Esther Vergeer (Netherlands) Sharon Walraven (x2)	(United Kingdom) Andy Lapthorne (United Kingdom) Peter Norfolk (x2)
2013	(Japan) Shingo Kunieda (x3)	(Netherlands) Aniek van Koot	(United States) David Wagner (x2)	(France) Michaël Jérémiasz (Japan) Shingo Kunieda	(Netherlands) Jiske Griffioen (Netherlands) Aniek van Koot	(United States) Nick Taylor (United States) David Wagner
2014	(Japan) Shingo Kunieda (x3)	(Germany) Sabine Ellerbrock	(United States) David Wagner (x2)	(France) Stéphane Houdet (Japan) Shingo Kunieda (x2)	(Japan) Yui Kamiji (United Kingdom) Jordanne Whiley (x2)	(United Kingdom) Andy Lapthorne (United States) David Wagner (x2)
2015	(Japan) Shingo Kunieda (x3)	(Netherlands) Jiske Griffioen (x2)	(Australia) Dylan Alcott (x7)	(France) Stéphane Houdet (Japan) Shingo Kunieda (x2)	(Japan) Yui Kamiji (United Kingdom) Jordanne Whiley (x2)	(United Kingdom) Andy Lapthorne (United States) David Wagner (x2)
2016	(United Kingdom) Gordon Reid	(Netherlands) Jiske Griffioen (x2)	(Australia) Dylan Alcott (x7)	(France) Stéphane Houdet (France) Nicolas Peifer	(Netherlands) Marjolein Buis (Japan) Yui Kamiji	(South Africa) Lucas Sithole (United States) David Wagner
2017	(Argentina) Gustavo Fernández	(Japan) Yui Kamiji	(Australia) Dylan Alcott (x7)	(Belgium) Joachim Gérard (United Kingdom) Gordon Reid	(Netherlands) Jiske Griffioen (Netherlands) Aniek van Koot	(United Kingdom) Andy Lapthorne (United States) David Wagner
2018	(Japan) Shingo Kunieda	(Netherlands) Diede de Groot (x2)	(Australia) Dylan Alcott (x7)	(France) Stéphane Houdet (France) Nicolas Peifer	(Netherlands) Marjolein Buis (Japan) Yui Kamiji	(Australia) Dylan Alcott (Australia) Heath Davidson (x4)
2019	(Argentina) Gustavo Fernández	(Netherlands) Diede de Groot (x2)	(Australia) Dylan Alcott (x7)	(Belgium) Joachim Gérard (Sweden) Stefan Olsson	(Netherlands) Diede de Groot (Netherlands) Aniek van Koot	(Australia) Dylan Alcott (Australia) Heath Davidson (x4)
2020	(Japan) Shingo Kunieda	(Japan) Yui Kamiji	(Australia) Dylan Alcott (x7)	(United Kingdom) Alfie Hewett (United Kingdom) Gordon Reid (x6)	(Japan) Yui Kamiji (United Kingdom) Jordanne Whiley	(Australia) Dylan Alcott (Australia) Heath Davidson (x4)
2021	(Belgium) Joachim Gérard	(Netherlands) Diede de Groot (x4)	(Australia) Dylan Alcott (x7)	(United Kingdom) Alfie Hewett (United Kingdom) Gordon Reid (x6)	(Netherlands) Diede de Groot (Netherlands) Aniek van Koot (x3)	(Australia) Dylan Alcott (Australia) Heath Davidson (x4)
2022	(Japan) Shingo Kunieda	(Netherlands) Diede de Groot (x4)	(Netherlands) Sam Schröder (x4)	(United Kingdom) Alfie Hewett (United Kingdom) Gordon Reid (x6)	(Netherlands) Diede de Groot (Netherlands) Aniek van Koot (x3)	(United Kingdom) Andy Lapthorne (United States) David Wagner
2023	(United Kingdom) Alfie Hewett	(Netherlands) Diede de Groot (x4)	(Netherlands) Sam Schröder (x4)	(United Kingdom) Alfie Hewett (United Kingdom) Gordon Reid (x6)	(Netherlands) Diede de Groot (Netherlands) Aniek van Koot (x3)	(Netherlands) Sam Schröder (Netherlands) Niels Vink
2024	(Japan) Tokito Oda	(Netherlands) Diede de Groot (x4)	(Netherlands) Sam Schröder (x4)	(United Kingdom) Alfie Hewett (United Kingdom) Gordon Reid (x6)	(Netherlands) Diede de Groot (Netherlands) Jiske Griffioen	(United Kingdom) Andy Lapthorne (United States) David Wagner
2025	(United Kingdom) Alfie Hewett	(Japan) Yui Kamiji	(Netherlands) Sam Schröder (x4)	(United Kingdom) Alfie Hewett (United Kingdom) Gordon Reid (x6)	(China) Li Xiaohui (China) Wang Ziying (x2)	(United Kingdom) Andy Lapthorne (Netherlands) Sam Schröder
2026	(Japan) Tokito Oda	(China) Li Xiaohui	(Netherlands) Niels Vink	(Argentina) Gustavo Fernández (Japan) Tokito Oda	(China) Li Xiaohui (China) Wang Ziying (x2)	(Israel) Guy Sasson (Netherlands) Niels Vink

=== Junior ===
Year	Singles		Doubles	
Year	Boys	Girls	Boys	Girls
1922	(Australia) A.E. Yelden	No competition	(Australia) C. Grogan (Australia) L. Roche	No competition
1923	(Australia) L. Cryle	No competition	(Australia) Edgar Moon ‡ (Australia) L. Roche	No competition
1924	(Australia) Alan Coldham (x2)	No competition	(Australia) A. Berckelman (Australia) Ray Dunlop ‡	No competition
1925	(Australia) Alan Coldham (x2)	No competition	(Australia) Jack Crawford ‡ (Australia) Harry Hopman ‡ (x3)	No competition
1926	(Australia) Jack Crawford ‡ (x4)	No competition	(Australia) Jack Crawford ‡ (Australia) Harry Hopman ‡ (x3)	No competition
1927	(Australia) Jack Crawford ‡ (x4)	No competition	(Australia) Jack Crawford ‡ (Australia) Harry Hopman ‡ (x3)	No competition
1928	(Australia) Jack Crawford ‡ (x4)	No competition	(Australia) Jack Crawford (Australia) C. Whiteman	No competition
1929	(Australia) Jack Crawford ‡ (x4)	No competition	(Australia) C.W. Cropper (Australia) W.B. Walker	No competition
1930	(Australia) Don Turnbull	(Australia) Emily Hood ‡	(Australia) Adrian Quist ‡ (Australia) Don Turnbull ‡	(Australia) Nell Hall (Australia) Emily Hood ‡
1931	(Australia) Bruce Moore	(Australia) Joan Hartigan ‡	(Australia) Jack Purcell (Australia) Bert Tonkin	(Australia) S. Moon (Australia) Emily Westacott
1932	(Australia) Vivian McGrath ‡	(Australia) Nancy Lewis (x2)	(Australia) Adrian Quist ‡ (Australia) Len Schwartz	(Australia) F. Francisco (Australia) J. Williams
1933	(Australia) Adrian Quist ‡	(Australia) Nancy Lewis (x2)	(Australia) Jack Purcell (Australia) Bert Tonkin	(Australia) Dorothy Stevenson (Australia) Gwen Stevenson
1934	(Australia) Neil Ennis	(Australia) May Blick	(Australia) Neils Ennis (Australia) Colin McKenzie	(Australia) E. Chrystal (Australia) E. McColl
1935	(Australia) John Bromwich ‡ (x3)	(Australia) Thelma Coyne ‡ (x2)	(Australia) John Bromwich ‡ (Australia) Arthur Huxley	(Australia) Dorothy Stevenson (Australia) Nancye Wynne ‡
1936	(Australia) John Bromwich ‡ (x3)	(Australia) Thelma Coyne ‡ (x2)	(Australia) John Gilchrist (Australia) Henry Lindo	(Australia) M. Carter (Australia) Margaret Wilson
1937	(Australia) John Bromwich ‡ (x3)	(Australia) Margaret Wilson	(Australia) John Bromwich ‡ (Australia) Dinny Pails	(Australia) J. Prior (Australia) I. Webb
1938	(Australia) Max Newcombe	(Australia) Joyce Wood (x3)	(Australia) Dinny Pails (Australia) William Sidwell	(Australia) Alison Burton (Australia) Joyce Wood (x3)
1939	(Australia) Bill Sidwell	(Australia) Joyce Wood (x3)	(Australia) Roy Felan (Australia) H.N. Impey	(Australia) Alison Burton (Australia) Joyce Wood (x3)
1940	(Australia) Dinny Pails ‡	(Australia) Joyce Wood (x3)	(Australia) William Edwards (Australia) Dinny Pails	(Australia) Alison Burton (Australia) Joyce Wood (x3)
1941	No tournament due to World War II			
1942	No tournament due to World War II			
1943	No tournament due to World War II			
1944	No tournament due to World War II			
1945	No tournament due to World War II			
1946	(Australia) Frank Sedgman ‡	(Australia) Shirley Grant	(Australia) Frank Herringe (Australia) George Worthington	(Australia) N. Reid (Australia) Helen Utz
1947	(Australia) Don Candy	(Australia) Joan Tuckfield	(Australia) Rex Hartwig ‡ (Australia) Allan Kendall	(Australia) Shirley Jackson (Australia) Veronica Linehan
1948	(Australia) Ken McGregor ‡	(Australia) Beryl Penrose ‡	(Australia) Don Candy (Australia) Ken McGregor ‡	(Australia) Gloria Blair (Australia) B. Bligh
1949	(Australia) Clive Wilderspin	(Australia) Judy Warnock	(Australia) John Blacklock (Australia) Clive Wilderspin	(Australia) Beryl Penrose ‡ (Australia) Jean Robbins
1950	(Australia) Ken Rosewall ‡	(Australia) Barbara McIntyre	(Australia) Lew Hoad ‡ (Australia) Ken Rosewall ‡ (x3)	(Australia) Carmen Borelli (Australia) Pam Southcombe
1951	(Australia) Lew Hoad ‡	(Australia) Mary Carter ‡ (x2)	(Australia) Lew Hoad ‡ (Australia) Ken Rosewall ‡ (x3)	(Australia) Jenny Staley (Australia) Margaret Wallis
1952	(Australia) Ken Rosewall ‡	(Australia) Mary Carter ‡ (x2)	(Australia) Lew Hoad ‡ (Australia) Ken Rosewall ‡ (x3)	(Australia) Mary Carter ‡ (Australia) Betty Holstein
1953	(Australia) Bill Gilmour	(Australia) Jenny Staley	(Australia) William Gilmore (Australia) Warren Woodcock	(Australia) Mary Carter ‡ (Australia) Barbara Warby
1954	(United Kingdom) Billy Knight	(Australia) Elizabeth Orton (x2)	(Australia) Mal Anderson ‡ (Australia) Roy Emerson ‡	(Australia) Betty Holstein (Australia) Beth Jones
1955	(United States) Gerry Moss	(Australia) Elizabeth Orton (x2)	(United States) Mike Green (United States) Gerry Moss	(Australia) Elizabeth Orton (Australia) Pat Parmenter
1956	(Australia) Bob Mark	(Australia) Lorraine Coghlan	(Australia) Paul Heamden (Australia) Bob Mark ‡	(United Kingdom) Sheila Armstrong (Australia) Lorraine Coghlan
1957	(Australia) Rod Laver ‡	(Australia) Margot Rayson	(Australia) Frank Gorman (Australia) Rod Laver ‡	(Australia) Margot Rayson (Australia) Val Roberts
1958	(Australia) Martin Mulligan	(Australia) Jan Lehane (x2)	(Australia) Bob Hewitt ‡ (Australia) Martin Mulligan	(Australia) Betty Holstein (Australia) Jan Lehane
1959	(United States) Butch Buchholz	(Australia) Jan Lehane (x2)	(Spain) José Luis Arilla (United States) Butch Buchholz	(Australia) Jan Lehane (Australia) Dawn Robberds
1960	(Australia) Will Coghlan	(Australia) Lesley Turner	(Australia) Greg Hughes (Australia) Jim Shepherd	(Australia) Dawn Robberds (Australia) Lesley Turner ‡
1961	(Australia) John Newcombe ‡ (x3)	(Australia) Robyn Ebbern (x3)	(Australia) Rod Brent (Australia) John Newcombe ‡	(Australia) Robyn Ebbern ‡ (Australia) Madonna Schacht
1962	(Australia) John Newcombe ‡ (x3)	(Australia) Robyn Ebbern (x3)	(Australia) William Bowrey (Australia) Geoffrey Knox	(Australia) Heather Ross (Australia) Jill Starr
1963	(Australia) John Newcombe ‡ (x3)	(Australia) Robyn Ebbern (x3)	(Australia) Robert Brien (Australia) John Cotterill	(Australia) Trish McClenaughan (Australia) Gail Sherriff
1964	(Australia) Tony Roche	(Australia) Kaye Dening	(United Kingdom) Stanley Matthews (United Kingdom) Graham Stillwell	(Australia) Kaye Dening (Australia) Helen Gourlay ‡
1965	(France) Georges Goven	(Australia) Kerry Melville ‡	(Australia) Terence Musgrave (Australia) John Walker	(Australia) Helen Gourlay ‡ (Australia) Kerry Melville ‡
1966	(Australia) Karl Coombes	(Australia) Karen Krantzcke	(Australia) Rorbert Layton (Australia) Pat McCumstie	(Australia) Karen Krantzcke ‡ (Australia) Pat Turner
1967	(New Zealand) Brian Fairlie	(Australia) Lexie Kenny	(Australia) John Barlett (Sweden) Sven Ginman	(Australia) Sue Alexander (tennis) (Australia) Caroline Cooper
1968	(Australia) Phil Dent	(Australia) Lesley Hunt (x2)	(Australia) Phil Dent ‡ (Australia) William Lloyd	(Australia) Lesley Hunt (Australia) Vicki Lancaster
1969	(Australia) Allan McDonald	(Australia) Lesley Hunt (x2)	(Australia) Neil Higgins (Australia) John James	(Australia) Pat Edwards (Australia) Evonne Goolagong ‡
1970	(Australia) John Alexander	(Australia) Evonne Goolagong ‡	(Australia) Allan McDonald (Australia) Greg Perkins	(Australia) Janet Fallis (Australia) Janet Young
1971	(Australia) Cliff Letcher	(Australia) Pat Coleman (x2)	(Australia) John Marks (Australia) Michael Phillips	(Australia) Pat Edwards (Australia) Janice Whyte
1972	(Australia) Paul Kronk	(Australia) Pat Coleman (x2)	(Australia) Bill Durham (Australia) Steve Myers	(Australia) Sally Irvine (Australia) Pam Whytcross
1973	(Australia) Paul McNamee	(Australia) Chris O'Neil ‡	(Australia) Terry Saunders (Australia) Graham Thoroughgood	(Australia) Jenny Dimond (Australia) Dianne Fromholtz ‡
1974	(Australia) Harry Britain	(Australia) Jennifer Walker	(Australia) David Carter (Australia) Trevor Little	(Australia) Nerida Gregory (Australia) Julia Hanrahan
1975	(Australia) Brad Drewett	(United Kingdom) Sue Barker	(Australia) Glenn Busby (Australia) Warren Maher	(Australia) Dianne Evers ‡ (Australia) Nerida Gregory
1976	(Australia) Ray Kelly (x2)	(Australia) Sue Saliba	(Australia) Peter McCarthy (Australia) Charlie Fancutt	(Australia) Jan Morton (Australia) Jan Wilton
1977^{Jan}	(Australia) Ray Kelly (x2)	(Australia) Amanda Tobin	(Australia) Phil Davies (Australia) Peter Smylie	(Australia) Kerryn Pratt (Australia) Amanda Tobin (x2)
1977^{Dec}	(Australia) Brad Drewett	(Australia) Pamela Baily	(Australia) Ray Kelly (Australia) Geoffrey Thams	(Australia) Kerryn Pratt (Australia) Amanda Tobin (x2)
1978	(Australia) Pat Serret	(Australia) Elizabeth Little	(Australia) Michael Fancutt (Australia) Bill Gilmour, Jr.	(Australia) Debbie Freeman (Australia) Kathy Mantle
1979	(Australia) Greg Whitecross	(Australia) Anne Minter (x3)	(Australia) Michael Fancutt (Australia) Greg Whitecross	(Australia) Linda Cassell (Australia) Susan Leo
1980	(Australia) Craig Miller	(Australia) Anne Minter (x3)	(Australia) William Masur (Australia) Craig Miller	(Australia) Anne Minter (Australia) Miranda Yates
1981	(Sweden) Jörgen Windahl	(Australia) Anne Minter (x3)	(New Zealand) David Lewis (Australia) Tony Withers	(Australia) Maree Booth (Australia) Sharon Hodgkin
1982	(Australia) Mark Kratzmann	(United Kingdom) Amanda Brown (x2)	(Australia) Brendan Burke (Australia) Mark Hartnett	(Australia) Annette Gulley (Australia) Kim Staunton
1983	(Sweden) Stefan Edberg ‡	(United Kingdom) Amanda Brown (x2)	(Australia) Jamie Harty (Australia) Des Tyson	(Australia) Bernadette Randall (Australia) Kim Staunton
1984	(Australia) Mark Kratzmann	(United Kingdom) Annabel Croft	(Australia) Mike Baroch (Australia) Mark Kratzmann	(Australia) Louise Field (Soviet Union) Larisa Savchenko
1985	(Australia) Shane Barr	(Australia) Jenny Byrne	(Australia) Brett Custer (Australia) David Macpherson	(Australia) Jenny Byrne (Australia) Janine Thompson
1986	No tournament			
1987	(Australia) Jason Stoltenberg	(Australia) Michelle Jaggard	(Australia) Jason Stoltenberg (Australia) Todd Woodbridge ‡ (x2)	(Belgium) Ann Devries (Australia) Nicole Provis
1988	(Australia) Johan Anderson	(Australia) Jo-Anne Faull	(Australia) Jason Stoltenberg (Australia) Todd Woodbridge ‡ (x2)	(Australia) Jo-Anne Faull (Australia) Rachel McQuillan
1989	(Sweden) Nicklas Kulti	(United States) Kim Kessaris	(Australia) Johan Anderson (Australia) Todd Woodbridge ‡	(Czechoslovakia) Andrea Strnadová (Czechoslovakia) Eva Švíglerová
1990	(Germany) Dirk Dier	(Bulgaria) Magdalena Maleeva	(Sweden) Roger Pettersson (Sweden) Martin Renstrom	(Israel) Rona Mayer (Israel) Limor Zaltz
1991	(Sweden) Thomas Enqvist†	(Australia) Nicole Pratt	(Australia) Grant Doyle (Australia) Joshua Eagle	(Czechoslovakia) Karina Habšudová (Germany) Barbara Rittner
1992	(Australia) Grant Doyle	(Australia) Joanne Limmer	(Australia) Grant Doyle (Australia) Brad Sceney	(United States) Lindsay Davenport † (United States) Nicole London
1993	(United Kingdom) James Baily	(Germany) Heike Rusch	(Germany) Lars Rehmann (Germany) Christian Tambue	(Switzerland) Joana Manta (Czech Republic) Ludmila Richterová
1994	(Australia) Ben Ellwood	(Australia) Trudi Musgrave	(Australia) Ben Ellwood (Australia) Mark Philippoussis	(United States) Corina Morariu † (Czech Republic) Ludmila Varmužová (x2)
1995	(Germany) Nicolas Kiefer	(Australia) Siobhan Drake-Brockman	(Australia) Luke Bourgeois (South Korea) Lee Jong-min	(United States) Corina Morariu † (Czech Republic) Ludmila Varmužová (x2)
1996	(Sweden) Björn Rehnquist	(Poland) Magdalena Grzybowska	(Italy) Daniele Bracciali (Canada) Jocelyn Robichaud	(Czech Republic) Michaela Paštiková (Czech Republic) Jitka Schönfeldová
1997	(Germany) Daniel Elsner	(Croatia) Mirjana Lučić	(United Kingdom) David Sherwood (United Kingdom) James Trotman	(Croatia) Mirjana Lučić ‡ (Germany) Jasmin Wöhr
1998	(France) Julien Jeanpierre	(Croatia) Jelena Kostanić	(France) Jérôme Haehnel (France) Julien Jeanpierre	(Australia) Evie Dominikovic (Australia) Alicia Molik ‡
1999	(Denmark) Kristian Pless	(France) Virginie Razzano	(Austria) Jürgen Melzer (Denmark) Kristian Pless	(Greece) Eleni Daniilidou (France) Virginie Razzano
2000	(United States) Andy Roddick	(Hungary) Anikó Kapros	(France) Nicolas Mahut ‡ (Spain) Tommy Robredo	(Hungary) Anikó Kapros (Australia) Christina Wheeler
2001	(Federal Republic of Yugoslavia) Janko Tipsarević	(Federal Republic of Yugoslavia) Jelena Janković	(United States) Ytai Abougzir (Argentina) Luciano Vitullo	(Czech Republic) Petra Cetkovská (Czech Republic) Barbora Strýcová
2002	(France) Clément Morel	(Czech Republic) Barbora Strýcová (x2)	(Australia) Ryan Henry (Australia) Todd Reid	(Argentina) Gisela Dulko ‡ (Indonesia) Angelique Widjaja
2003	(Cyprus) Marcos Baghdatis †	(Czech Republic) Barbora Strýcová (x2)	(United States) Scott Oudsema (United States) Phillip Simmonds	(Australia) Casey Dellacqua † (Australia) Adriana Szili
2004	(France) Gaël Monfils	(Israel) Shahar Pe'er	(United States) Brendan Evans (United States) Scott Oudsema	(Chinese Taipei) Chan Yung-jan † (China) Sun Shengnan
2005	(United States) Donald Young	(Belarus) Victoria Azarenka ‡	(South Korea) Kim Sun-yong (Chinese Taipei) Yi Chu-huan	(Belarus) Victoria Azarenka † (New Zealand) Marina Erakovic
2006	(France) Alexandre Sidorenko	(Russia) Anastasia Pavlyuchenkova (x2)	(Poland) Błażej Koniusz (Poland) Grzegorz Panfil	(Canada) Sharon Fichman (Russia) Anastasia Pavlyuchenkova
2007	(Australia) Brydan Klein	(Russia) Anastasia Pavlyuchenkova (x2)	(United Kingdom) Graeme Dyce (Finland) Harri Heliövaara	(Russia) Evgeniya Rodina (Russia) Arina Rodionova
2008	(Australia) Bernard Tomic	(Netherlands) Arantxa Rus	(Chinese Taipei) Hsieh Cheng-peng (Chinese Taipei) Yang Tsung-hua	(Russia) Ksenia Lykina (Russia) Anastasia Pavlyuchenkova
2009	(India) Yuki Bhambri	(Russia) Ksenia Pervak	(Philippines) Francis Alcantara (Chinese Taipei) Hsieh Cheng-peng	(United States) Christina McHale (Croatia) Ajla Tomljanović
2010	(Brazil) Tiago Fernandes	(Czech Republic) Karolína Plíšková	(Netherlands) Justin Eleveld (Netherlands) Jannick Lupescu	(Slovakia) Jana Čepelová (Slovakia) Chantal Škamlová
2011	(Czech Republic) Jiří Veselý	(Belgium) An-Sophie Mestach	(Slovakia) Filip Horanský (Czech Republic) Jiří Veselý	(Belgium) An-Sophie Mestach (Netherlands) Demi Schuurs
2012	(Australia) Luke Saville	(United States) Taylor Townsend	(United Kingdom) Liam Broady (United Kingdom) Joshua Ward-Hibbert	(United States) Gabrielle Andrews (United States) Taylor Townsend ‡
2013	(Australia) Nick Kyrgios	(Croatia) Ana Konjuh	(Australia) Jay Andrijic (Australia) Bradley Mousley	(Croatia) Ana Konjuh (Canada) Carol Zhao
2014	(Germany) Alexander Zverev †	(Russia) Elizaveta Kulichkova	(Austria) Lucas Miedler (Australia) Bradley Mousley	(Ukraine) Anhelina Kalinina (Russia) Elizaveta Kulichkova
2015	(Russia) Roman Safiullin	(Slovakia) Tereza Mihalíková	(Australia) Jake Delaney (Australia) Marc Polmans †	(Czech Republic) Miriam Kolodziejová (Czech Republic) Markéta Vondroušová
2016	(Australia) Oliver Anderson	(Belarus) Vera Lapko	(Australia) Alex de Minaur (Australia) Blake Ellis	(Russia) Anna Kalinskaya (Slovakia) Tereza Mihalíková
2017	(Hungary) Zsombor Piros	(Ukraine) Marta Kostyuk	(Chinese Taipei) Hsu Yu-hsiou (China) Zhao Lingxi	(Canada) Bianca Andreescu (United States) Carson Branstine
2018	(United States) Sebastian Korda	(Chinese Taipei) Liang En-shuo	(France) Hugo Gaston (France) Clément Tabur	(Chinese Taipei) Liang En-shuo (China) Wang Xinyu
2019	(Italy) Lorenzo Musetti	(Denmark) Clara Tauson	(Czech Republic) Jonáš Forejtek (Czech Republic) Dalibor Svrčina	(Japan) Natsumi Kawaguchi (Hungary) Adrienn Nagy
2020	(France) Harold Mayot	(Andorra) Victoria Jiménez Kasintseva	(Romania) Nicholas David Ionel (Switzerland) Leandro Riedi	(Philippines) Alexandra Eala (Indonesia) Priska Madelyn Nugroho
2021	No competition due to the COVID-19 pandemic			
2022	(United States) Bruno Kuzuhara	(Croatia) Petra Marčinko	(United States) Bruno Kuzuhara (Hong Kong) Coleman Wong	(United States) Clervie Ngounoue (Russia) Diana Shnaider
2023	(Belgium) Alexander Blockx	Alina Korneeva	(United States) Learner Tien (United States) Cooper Williams	(Slovakia) Renáta Jamrichová (Italy) Federica Urgesi
2024	(Japan) Rei Sakamoto	(Slovakia) Renáta Jamrichová	(United States) Maxwell Exsted (United States) Cooper Woestendick	(United States) Tyra Caterina Grant (United States) Iva Jovic
2025	(Switzerland) Henry Bernet	(Japan) Wakana Sonobe	(United States) Maxwell Exsted (Czech Republic) Jan Kumstát	(United States) Annika Penickova (United States) Kristina Penickova
2026	(Slovenia) Žiga Šeško	(France) Ksenia Efremova	(South Africa) Connor Doig (Bulgaria) Dimitar Kisimov	(Czech Republic) Alena Kovačková (Czech Republic) Jana Kovačková

‡ Player won both the junior and senior title.
† Player won the junior title and reached the senior final.

=== Junior wheelchair ===
Year	Singles		Doubles	
Year	Boys	Girls	Boys	Girls
2025	(United States) Charlie Cooper	(Brazil) Vitória Miranda	(Brazil) Luiz Calixto (United States) Charlie Cooper	(Belgium) Luna Gryp (Brazil) Vitória Miranda
2026	(Belgium) Alexander Lantermann	(Belgium) Luna Gryp	(United Kingdom) Lucas John De Gouveia (Belgium) Alexander Lantermann	(United Kingdom) Lucy Foyster (Japan) Seira Matsuoka

‡ = a player who won both the junior and senior title.
† = a player who won the junior title and reached the senior final.

== See also ==
Lists of champions of specific events

- List of Australian Open men's singles champions
- List of Australian Open women's singles champions
- List of Australian Open men's doubles champions
- List of Australian Open women's doubles champions
- List of Australian Open mixed doubles champions

Other Grand Slam tournament champions

- List of French Open champions
- List of Wimbledon champions
- List of US Open champions
