= 1952 in tennis =

This page covers all the important events in the sport of tennis in 1952. It provides the results of notable tournaments throughout the year on both the men's and women's ILTF tennis circuits.

== Australian Open ==
| Category | Champion(s) | Finalist(s) | Score |
|---|---|---|---|
| Men's singles | (Australia) Ken McGregor | (Australia) Frank Sedgman | 7–5, 12–10, 2–6, 6–2 |
| Women's singles | (Australia) Thelma Coyne Long | (Australia) Helen Angwin | 6–2, 6–3 |
| Men's doubles | (Australia) Ken McGregor (Australia) Frank Sedgman | (Australia) Don Candy (Australia) Mervyn Rose | 6–4, 7–5, 6–3 |
| Women's doubles | (Australia) Thelma Coyne Long (Australia) Nancye Wynne Bolton | (Australia) Alison Burton Baker (Australia) Mary Bevis Hawton | 6–1, 6–1 |
| Mixed doubles | (Australia) Thelma Coyne Long (Australia) George Worthington | (Australia) Gwen Thiele (Australia) Tom Warhurst | 9–7, 7–5 |

== French Open ==
| Category | Champion(s) | Finalist(s) | Score |
|---|---|---|---|
| Men's singles | (Egypt) Jaroslav Drobný | (Australia) Frank Sedgman | 6–2, 6–0, 3–6, 6–4 |
| Women's singles | (United States) Doris Hart | (United States) Shirley Fry | 6–4, 6–4 |
| Men's doubles | (Australia) Ken McGregor (Australia) Frank Sedgman | (United States) Gardnar Mulloy (United States) Dick Savitt | 6–3, 6–4, 6–4 |
| Women's doubles | (United States) Doris Hart (United States) Shirley Fry | (South Africa) Hazel Redick-Smith (South Africa) Julia Wipplinger | 7–5, 6–1 |
| Mixed doubles | (United States) Doris Hart (Australia) Frank Sedgman | (United States) Shirley Fry (South Africa) Eric Sturgess | 6–8, 6–3, 6–3 |

== Wimbledon ==
| Category | Champion(s) | Finalist(s) | Score |
|---|---|---|---|
| Men's singles | (Australia) Frank Sedgman | (Egypt) Jaroslav Drobný | 4–6, 6–2, 6–3, 6–2 |
| Women's singles | (United States) Maureen Connolly | (United States) Louise Brough | 7–5, 6–3 |
| Men's doubles | (Australia) Ken McGregor (Australia) Frank Sedgman | (United States) Vic Seixas (South Africa) Eric Sturgess | 6–3, 7–5, 6–4 |
| Women's doubles | (United States) Shirley Fry (United States) Doris Hart | (United States) Louise Brough (United States) Maureen Connolly | 8–6, 6–3 |
| Mixed doubles | (Australia) Frank Sedgman (United States) Doris Hart | (Argentina) Enrique Morea (Australia) Thelma Long | 4–6, 6–3, 6–4 |

== US Open ==
| Category | Champion(s) | Finalist(s) | Score |
|---|---|---|---|
| Men's singles | (Australia) Frank Sedgman | (United States) Gardnar Mulloy | 6–1, 6–2, 6–3 |
| Women's singles | (United States) Maureen Connolly | (United States) Doris Hart | 6–3, 7–5 |
| Men's doubles | (Australia) Mervyn Rose (United States) Vic Seixas | (Australia) Ken McGregor (Australia) Frank Sedgman | 3–6, 10–8, 10–8, 6–8, 8–6 |
| Women's doubles | (United States) Shirley Fry (United States) Doris Hart | (United States) Louise Brough (United States) Maureen Connolly | 10–8, 6–4 |
| Mixed doubles | (United States) Doris Hart (Australia) Frank Sedgman | (Australia) Thelma Coyne Long (Australia) Lew Hoad | 6–3, 7–5 |
