= 1954 Australian Championships – Women's singles =

Women's singles
- 1954 Australian Championships

Final
- Champion: (Australia) Thelma Long
- Runner-up: (Australia) Jenny Staley
- Score: 6–3, 6–4

Details
- Draw: 32
- Seeds: 10

Events
Singles	men	women
Doubles	men	women
- Australian Championships

First-seeded Thelma Long defeated Jenny Staley 6–3, 6–4 in the final to win the women's singles tennis title at the 1954 Australian Championships.

== Seeds ==
The seeded players are listed below. Thelma Long is the champion; others show the round in which they were eliminated.

1. (Australia) Thelma Long (champion)
2. (Australia) Mary Hawton (semifinals)
3. (Australia) Jenny Staley (finalist)
4. (Australia) Beryl Penrose (second round)
5. (Australia) Helen Angwin (second round)
6. (Australia) Norma Ellis (first round)
7. (Australia) Fay Muller (second round)
8. (Australia) Dorn Fogarty (first round)
9. (South Africa) Hazel Redick-Smith (quarterfinals)
10. (South Africa) Julia Wipplinger (first round)

== Draw ==
=== Key ===
- Q = Qualifier
- WC = Wild card
- LL = Lucky loser
- r = Retired

=== Finals ===
Quarterfinals
1	(Australia) Thelma Long	6	6
(Australia) Nell Hopman	0	0
(Australia) Loris Nichols	5	4
(Australia) Mary Carter	7	6
9	(South Africa) Hazel Redick-Smith	8	7	3
3	(Australia) Jenny Staley	10	5	6
(Australia) Barbara Warby	4	3
2	(Australia) Mary Hawton	6	6

Semifinals
1	(Australia) Thelma Long	6	6
(Australia) Mary Carter	2	3
3	(Australia) Jenny Staley	6	6
2	(Australia) Mary Hawton	1	1

Finals
1	(Australia) Thelma Long	6	6
3	(Australia) Jenny Staley	3	4

=== Earlier rounds ===
==== Section 1 ====
First round
1	(Australia) Long	6	6
(Australia) Newcombe	1	1
(Australia) Bryant	6	6
(Australia) Fulton	2	0
(Australia) Hopman	6	6
8	(Australia) Fogarty	2	2
(Australia) O'Donnell
(New Zealand) Burke	w/o
4	(Australia) Penrose	6	6
(Australia) Franklin	2	1
(Australia) Nichols	8	6
(Australia) McCamley	6	3
5	(Australia) Angwin	6	6
(Australia) Hattersley	2	2
(Australia) Carter	6	8
10	(South Africa) Wipplinger	1	6

Second round
1	(Australia) Long	6	6
(Australia) Bryant	0	4
(Australia) Hopman
(Australia) O'Donnell	w/o
4	(Australia) Penrose	4	6	4
(Australia) Nichols	6	2	6
5	(Australia) Angwin	4	4
(Australia) Carter	6	6

Quarterfinals
1	(Australia) Long	6	6
(Australia) Hopman	0	0
(Australia) Nichols	5	4
(Australia) Carter	7	6

Semifinals
1	(Australia) Long	6	6
(Australia) Carter	2	3

==== Section 2 ====
First round
9	(South Africa) Redick-Smith	6	6
(Australia) Hellyer	3	4
7	(Australia) Muller	6	6
(Australia) Martin	3	0
(Australia) Baker	3	6	6
(Australia) Wells	6	1	4
3	(Australia) Staley	6	6
(Australia) Edmondson	1	2
(Australia) Proctor	7	2	6
(Australia) Thiele	5	6	3
(Australia) Warby	6	7
6	(Australia) Ellis	4	5
(Australia) Seeney	6	6
(Australia) Taylor	0	3
2	(Australia) Hawton	6	6
(Australia) Parmenter	2	0

Second round
9	(South Africa) Redick-Smith	4	7	6
7	(Australia) Muller	6	5	4
(Australia) Baker	2	3
3	(Australia) Staley	6	6
(Australia) Proctor	7	1	0
(Australia) Warby	5	6	6
(Australia) Seeney	3	3
2	(Australia) Hawton	6	6

Quarterfinals
9	(South Africa) Redick-Smith	8	7	3
3	(Australia) Staley	10	5	6
(Australia) Warby	4	3
2	(Australia) Hawton	6	6

Semifinals
3	(Australia) Staley	6	6
2	(Australia) Hawton	1	1

Preceded by 1953 U.S. National Championships – Women's singles	Grand Slam women's singles	Succeeded by 1954 French Championships – Women's singles
