= 1952 Australian Championships – Women's singles =

Women's singles
- 1952 Australian Championships

Final
- Champion: (Australia) Thelma Long
- Runner-up: (Australia) Helen Angwin
- Score: 6–2, 6–3

Details
- Draw: 32
- Seeds: 8

Events
Singles	men	women		boys	girls
Doubles	men	women	mixed	boys	girls
- Australian Championships

Second-seeded Thelma Long defeated Helen Angwin 6–2, 6–3 in the final to win the women's singles tennis title at the 1952 Australian Championships.

== Seeds ==
The seeded players are listed below. Thelma Long is the champion; others show the round in which they were eliminated.

1. (Australia) Nancye Bolton (semifinals)
2. (Australia) Thelma Long (champion)
3. (Australia) Mary Hawton (semifinals)
4. (Australia) Beryl Penrose (quarterfinals)
5. (Australia) Nell Hopman (second round)
6. (Australia) Pam Southcombe (second round)
7. (Australia) Gwen Thiele (quarterfinals)
8. (Australia) Helen Angwin (finalist)

== Draw ==
=== Key ===
- Q = Qualifier
- WC = Wild card
- LL = Lucky loser
- r = Retired

=== Finals ===
Quarterfinals
1	(Australia) Nancye Bolton	6	6
(Australia) Alison Baker	1	1
4	(Australia) Beryl Penrose	6	1	2
8	(Australia) Helen Angwin	2	6	6
(Australia) Mary Schultz	1	3
3	(Australia) Mary Hawton	6	6
7	(Australia) Gwen Thiele	0	6	2
2	(Australia) Thelma Long	6	4	6

Semifinals
1	(Australia) Nancye Bolton	6	4	4
8	(Australia) Helen Angwin	4	6	6
3	(Australia) Mary Hawton	0	5
2	(Australia) Thelma Long	6	7

Finals
8	(Australia) Helen Angwin	2	3
2	(Australia) Thelma Long	6	6

=== Earlier rounds ===
==== Section 1 ====
First round
1	(Australia) Bolton	6	6
(Australia) Thomas	1	1
(Australia) Linn
(Australia) Donoghue	w/o
6	(Australia) Southcombe	6	7
(Australia) Blacklock	3	5
(Australia) Baker	5	6	6
(Australia) Heron	7	1	1
4	(Australia) Penrose	6	6
(Australia) Rosman	2	1
(Australia) Diggle	6	6
(Australia) Sim	2	1
8	(Australia) Angwin	6	8
(Australia) Muller	1	6
(Australia) Proctor	6	6
(Australia) O'Donnell	2	3

Second round
1	(Australia) Bolton	6	6
(Australia) Linn	3	2
6	(Australia) Southcombe	9	4
(Australia) Baker	11	6
4	(Australia) Penrose	6	6
(Australia) Diggle	4	1
8	(Australia) Angwin	12	6
(Australia) Proctor	10	0

Quarterfinals
1	(Australia) Bolton	6	6
(Australia) Baker	1	1
4	(Australia) Penrose	6	1	2
8	(Australia) Angwin	2	6	6

Semifinals
1	(Australia) Bolton	6	4	4
8	(Australia) Angwin	4	6	6

==== Section 2 ====
First round
(Australia) Schultz	6
(Australia) Olorenshaw	3
5	(Australia) Hopman	6	6
(Australia) Cooper	1	0
(Australia) Astley	6	6
(Australia) McDonald	1	1
3	(Australia) Hawton	6	6
(Australia) Ellis	2	0
(Australia) Staley	6	6
(Australia) Fogarty	1	3
7	(Australia) Thiele	6	6
(Australia) Martin	0	1
(Australia) Sheidow	6	6
(Australia) Wallis	4	1
2	(Australia) Long	6	6
(Australia) Thompson	0	1

Second round
(Australia) Schultz	11	1
5	(Australia) Hopman	9	0	r
(Australia) Astley	1	0
3	(Australia) Hawton	6	6
(Australia) Staley	10	3	7
7	(Australia) Thiele	8	6	9
(Australia) Sheidow	0	2
2	(Australia) Long	6	6

Quarterfinals
(Australia) Schultz	1	3
3	(Australia) Hawton	6	6
7	(Australia) Thiele	0	6	2
2	(Australia) Long	6	4	6

Semifinals
3	(Australia) Hawton	0	5
2	(Australia) Long	6	7

Preceded by 1951 U.S. National Championships – Women's singles	Grand Slam women's singles	Succeeded by 1952 French Championships – Women's singles
