= 1956 Australian Championships – Women's singles =

Women's singles
- 1956 Australian Championships

Final
- Champion: (Australia) Mary Carter
- Runner-up: (Australia) Thelma Long
- Score: 3–6, 6–2, 9–7

Details
- Draw: 32
- Seeds: 8

Events
Singles	men	women
Doubles	men	women
- Australian Championships

Second-seeded Mary Carter defeated Thelma Long 3–6, 6–2, 9–7 in the final to win the women's singles tennis title at the 1956 Australian Championships.

== Seeds ==
The seeded players are listed below. Mary Carter is the champion; others show the round in which they were eliminated.

1. (Australia) Mary Hawton (semifinals)
2. (Australia) Mary Carter (champion)
3. (Australia) Beryl Penrose (quarterfinals)
4. (Australia) Fay Muller (quarterfinals)
5. (Australia) Thelma Long (finalist)
6. (Australia) Daphne Seeney (semifinals)
7. (Australia) Loris Nichols (quarterfinals)
8. (Australia) Lorraine Coghlan (quarterfinals)

== Draw ==
=== Key ===
- Q = Qualifier
- WC = Wild card
- LL = Lucky loser
- r = Retired

=== Finals ===
Quarterfinals
1	(Australia) Mary Hawton	0	6	6
8	(Australia) Lorraine Coghlan	6	0	3
4	(Australia) Fay Muller	5	1
5	(Australia) Thelma Long	7	6
6	(Australia) Daphne Seeney	6	6
3	(Australia) Beryl Penrose	2	1
7	(Australia) Loris Nichols	1	5
2	(Australia) Mary Carter	6	7

Semifinals
1	(Australia) Mary Hawton	6	0	3
5	(Australia) Thelma Long	0	6	6
6	(Australia) Daphne Seeney	3	5
2	(Australia) Mary Carter	6	7

Finals
5	(Australia) Thelma Long	6	2	7
2	(Australia) Mary Carter	3	6	9

=== Earlier rounds ===
==== Section 1 ====
First round
1	(Australia) Hawton
(Australia) Gibson	w/o
(Australia) Thiele	6	6
(Australia) Lee	2	1
8	(Australia) Coghlan
(Australia) Bietzel	w/o
(Australia) Rayson	6	6
(Australia) Bowden	3	2
4	(Australia) Muller	6	6
(Australia) Strachan	2	2
(Australia) McCalman	2	6	6
(Australia) Parmenter	6	4	2
5	(Australia) Long	6	3	6
(Australia) Linde	0	6	1
(Australia) Jones	3	6	6
(Australia) Sheidow	6	3	3

Second round
1	(Australia) Hawton	6	6
(Australia) Thiele	1	1
8	(Australia) Coghlan	6	6
(Australia) Rayson	3	4
4	(Australia) Muller	6	6
(Australia) McCalman	1	3
5	(Australia) Long	8	4	9
(Australia) Jones	6	6	7

Quarterfinals
1	(Australia) Hawton	0	6	6
8	(Australia) Coghlan	6	0	3
4	(Australia) Muller	5	1
5	(Australia) Long	7	6

Semifinals
1	(Australia) Hawton	6	0	3
5	(Australia) Long	0	6	6

==== Section 2 ====
First round
(Australia) Hellyer	6	6
(Australia) Robinson	2	2
6	(Australia) Seeney	6	6
(Australia) Shearer	2	3
(United Kingdom) Armstrong	1	6	6
(Australia) Roberts	6	2	4
3	(Australia) Penrose	6	6
(Australia) Anderson	0	2
(Australia) Hopman	7	6
(Australia) Langley	5	1
7	(Australia) Nichols	6	4	6
(Australia) Bradfield	4	6	2
(Australia) Fogarty	6	6
(Australia) Lonergan	4	2
2	(Australia) Carter	6	6
(Australia) Couquerque	4	2

Second round
(Australia) Hellyer	6	4	4
6	(Australia) Seeney	3	6	6
(United Kingdom) Armstrong	2	6	2
3	(Australia) Penrose	6	4	6
(Australia) Hopman	2	1
7	(Australia) Nichols	6	6
(Australia) Fogarty	3	6
2	(Australia) Carter	6	8

Quarterfinals
6	(Australia) Seeney	6	6
3	(Australia) Penrose	2	1
7	(Australia) Nichols	1	5
2	(Australia) Carter	6	7

Semifinals
6	(Australia) Seeney	3	5
2	(Australia) Carter	6	7

Preceded by 1955 U.S. National Championships – Women's singles	Grand Slam women's singles	Succeeded by 1956 French Championships – Women's singles
