= 1948 Australian Championships – Women's singles =

Women's singles
- 1948 Australian Championships

Final
- Champion: (Australia) Nancye Bolton
- Runner-up: (Australia) Marie Toomey
- Score: 6–3, 6–1

Details
- Draw: 28
- Seeds: 8

Events
Singles	men	women
Doubles	men	women
- Australian Championships

First-seeded Nancye Bolton defeated Marie Toomey 6–3, 6–1 in the final to win the women's singles tennis title at the 1948 Australian Championships.

== Seeds ==
The seeded players are listed below. Nancye Bolton is the champion; others show the round in which they were eliminated.

1. (Australia) Nancye Bolton (champion)
2. (Australia) Thelma Long (second round)
3. (Australia) Mary Bevis (semifinals)
4. (Australia) Marie Toomey (finalist)
5. (Australia) Pat Jones (second round)
6. (Australia) Nell Hopman (quarterfinals)
7. (Australia) Sadie Newcombe (second round)
8. (Australia) Dulcie Whittaker (first round)

== Draw ==
=== Key ===
- Q = Qualifier
- WC = Wild card
- LL = Lucky loser
- r = Retired

=== Finals ===
Quarterfinals
1	(Australia) Nancye Bolton	6	6
(Australia) Joan Tuckfield	2	0
3	(Australia) Mary Beavis	7	6
6	(Australia) Nell Hopman	5	4
(Australia) Dorothy Jenkins	6	3
4	(Australia) Marie Toomey	8	6
(Australia) Esme Ashford	6	6
(Australia) Clare Proctor	1	0

Semifinals
1	(Australia) Nancye Bolton	6	6
3	(Australia) Mary Beavis	3	4
4	(Australia) Marie Toomey	4	7	6
(Australia) Esme Ashford	6	5	4

Finals
1	(Australia) Nancye Bolton	6	6
4	(Australia) Marie Toomey	3	1

=== Earlier rounds ===
==== Section 1 ====
First round
(Australia) Martin
8	(Australia) Whittaker	w/o
(Australia) Tuckfield	3	9	6
(Australia) Thiele	6	7	4
3	(Australia) Beavis	6	6
(Australia) Murphy	2	2
(Australia) McDermott	6	6
(Australia) Linehan	0	0
6	(Australia) Hopman	6	6
(Australia) Schultz	0	0
(Australia) Baker	6	8
(Australia) Taylor	4	6

Second round
1	(Australia) Bolton	6	6
(Australia) Earle	1	0
(Australia) Martin	5	3
(Australia) Tuckfield	7	6
3	(Australia) Beavis	6	6
(Australia) McDermott	2	4
6	(Australia) Hopman	6	6
(Australia) Baker	1	3

Quarterfinals
1	(Australia) Bolton	6	6
(Australia) Tuckfield	2	0
3	(Australia) Beavis	7	6
6	(Australia) Hopman	5	4

Semifinals
1	(Australia) Bolton	6	6
3	(Australia) Beavis	3	4

==== Section 2 ====
First round
(Australia) Jenkins	6	6
(Australia) Radford	3	0
5	(Australia) Jones	6	6
(Australia) Jackson	0	2
(Australia) Moran	6	6
(Australia) Longton	2	1
4	(Australia) Toomey	6	6
(Australia) Griffiths	0	0
(Australia) Ashford	6	4	6
(Australia) Chamberlin	2	6	2
7	(Australia) Newcombe	6	6
(Australia) Johnston	1	0

Second round
(Australia) Jenkins	3	6	6
5	(Australia) Jones	6	3	4
(Australia) Moran	w/o
4	(Australia) Toomey
(Australia) Ashford	6	4	7
7	(Australia) Newcombe	0	6	5
(Australia) Proctor
2	(Australia) Long	w/o

Quarterfinals
(Australia) Jenkins	8	6
4	(Australia) Toomey	6	3
(Australia) Ashford	6	6
(Australia) Proctor	1	0

Semifinals
4	(Australia) Toomey	4	7	6
(Australia) Ashford	6	5	4

Preceded by 1947 U.S. National Championships	Grand Slam women's singles	Succeeded by 1948 French Championships
