= 1947 Australian Championships – Women's singles =

Women's singles
- 1947 Australian Championships

Final
- Champion: (Australia) Nancye Bolton
- Runner-up: (Australia) Nell Hopman
- Score: 6–3, 6–2

Details
- Draw: 32
- Seeds: 8

Events
Singles	men	women
Doubles	men	women
- Australian Championships

First-seeded Nancye Bolton defeated Nell Hopman 6–3, 6–2 in the final to win the women's singles tennis title at the 1947 Australian Championships.

== Seeds ==
The seeded players are listed below. Nancye Bolton is the champion; others show the round in which they were eliminated.

1. (Australia) Nancye Bolton (champion)
2. (Australia) Thelma Long (semifinals)
3. (Australia) Joyce Fitch (quarterfinals)
4. (Australia) Sadie Newcombe (second round)
5. (Australia) Pat Jones (semifinals)
6. (Australia) Nell Hopman (finalist)
7. (Australia) Mary Beavis (quarterfinals)
8. (Australia) Constance Wilson (quarterfinals)

== Draw ==
=== Key ===
- Q = Qualifier
- WC = Wild card
- LL = Lucky loser
- r = Retired

=== Finals ===
Quarterfinals
1	(Australia) Nancye Bolton	6	6
7	(Australia) Mary Beavis	3	1
(Australia) Marie Toomey	5	6	5
5	(Australia) Pat Jones	7	2	7
2	(Australia) Thelma Long	6	6
8	(Australia) Constance Wilson	2	4
3	(Australia) Joyce Fitch	2	6	0
6	(Australia) Nell Hopman	6	2	6

Semifinals
1	(Australia) Nancye Bolton	6	6
5	(Australia) Pat Jones	2	1
2	(Australia) Thelma Long	4	1
6	(Australia) Nell Hopman	6	6

Finals
1	(Australia) Nancye Bolton	6	6
6	(Australia) Nell Hopman	3	2

=== Earlier rounds ===
==== Section 1 ====
First round
1	(Australia) Bolton	6	6
(Australia) Jenkins	1	2
(Australia) Fogarty	6	6
(Australia) Laurie	1	0
7	(Australia) Beavis	6	6
(Australia) Bryant	1	1
(Australia) Thiele	6	6
(Australia) Mills	0	3
4	(Australia) Newcombe	6	6
(Australia) Wiemers	0	0
(Australia) Toomey	7	6
(Australia) Chamberlain	5	2
5	(Australia) Jones	7	3	6
(Australia) Ashford	5	6	2
(Australia) Martin	6	9
(Australia) Sheidow	3	7

Second round
1	(Australia) Bolton	6	6
(Australia) Fogarty	2	3
7	(Australia) Beavis	6	6
(Australia) Thiele	2	2
4	(Australia) Newcombe	6	3	4
(Australia) Toomey	3	6	6
5	(Australia) Jones	6	6
(Australia) Martin	2	2

Quarterfinals
1	(Australia) Bolton	6	6
7	(Australia) Beavis	3	1
(Australia) Toomey	5	6	5
5	(Australia) Jones	7	2	7

Semifinals
1	(Australia) Bolton	6	6
5	(Australia) Jones	2	1

==== Section 2 ====
First round
2	(Australia) Long	7	6
(Australia) Hobbs	5	2
(Australia) Hartigan	6	6
(Australia) Chamberlin	2	2
8	(Australia) Wilson	6	6
(Australia) Kent	1	1
(Australia) Proctor	6	6
(Australia) Traeger	4	2
3	(Australia) Fitch	6	6
(Australia) Finn	2	3
(Australia) Whittaker	6	6
(Australia) Charlier	1	2
6	(Australia) Hopman	6	6
(Australia) Ashford	0	1
(Australia) Hattersley	6	6
(Australia) Taylor	2	4

Second round
2	(Australia) Long	6	6
(Australia) Hartigan	0	1
8	(Australia) Wilson	8	9
(Australia) Proctor	6	7
3	(Australia) Fitch	9	6
(Australia) Whittaker	7	4
6	(Australia) Hopman	6	6
(Australia) Hattersley	2	3

Quarterfinals
2	(Australia) Long	6	6
8	(Australia) Wilson	2	4
3	(Australia) Fitch	2	6	0
6	(Australia) Hopman	6	2	6

Semifinals
2	(Australia) Long	4	1
6	(Australia) Hopman	6	6

Preceded by 1946 U.S. National Championships	Grand Slam women's singles	Succeeded by 1947 Wimbledon Championships
