= 1954 Australian Championships =

- Date: 22 January – 1 February 1954
- Edition: 42nd
- Category: Grand Slam (ITF)
- Surface: Grass
- Location: Sydney, Australia
- Venue: White City Tennis Club

Champions

Men's singles
- (Australia) Mervyn Rose

Women's singles
- (Australia) Thelma Coyne Long

Men's doubles
- (Australia) Rex Hartwig / (Australia) Mervyn Rose

Women's doubles
- (Australia) Mary Bevis Hawton / (Australia) Beryl Penrose

Mixed doubles
- (Australia) Thelma Coyne Long / (Australia) Rex Hartwig
- Australian Championships

The 1954 Australian Championships was a tennis tournament that took place on outdoor grass courts at the White City Tennis Club, Sydney, Australia from 22 January to 1 February. It was the 42nd edition of the Australian Championships (now known as the Australian Open), the 12th held in Sydney, and the first Grand Slam tournament of the year. The singles titles were won by Australians Mervyn Rose and Thelma Coyne Long.

== Finals ==
=== Men's singles ===
(Australia) Mervyn Rose defeated (Australia) Rex Hartwig 6–2, 0–6, 6–4, 6–2

=== Women's singles ===
(Australia) Thelma Coyne Long defeated (Australia) Jenny Staley 6–3, 6–4

=== Men's doubles ===
(Australia) Rex Hartwig / (Australia) Mervyn Rose defeated (Australia) Neale Fraser / (Australia) Clive Wilderspin 6–3, 6–4, 6–2

=== Women's doubles ===
(Australia) Mary Bevis Hawton / (Australia) Beryl Penrose defeated (South Africa) Hazel Redick-Smith / (South Africa) Julia Wipplinger 6–3, 8–6

=== Mixed doubles ===
(Australia) Thelma Coyne Long / (Australia) Rex Hartwig defeated (Australia) Beryl Penrose / (Australia) John Bromwich 4–6, 6–1, 6–2

=== Boys' singles ===
(United Kingdom) Billy Knight defeated (Australia) Roy Emerson 6–3, 6–1

Preceded by 1953 U.S. National Championships	Grand Slams	Succeeded by 1954 French Championships
