= 1948 Australian Championships – Men's singles =

Men's singles
- 1948 Australian Championships

Final
- Champion: (Australia) Adrian Quist
- Runner-up: (Australia) John Bromwich
- Score: 6–4, 3–6, 6–3, 2–6, 6–3

Details
- Draw: 36
- Seeds: 10

Events
Singles	men	women
Doubles	men	women
- Australian Championships

Adrian Quist defeated John Bromwich 6–4, 3–6, 6–3, 2–6, 6–3 in the final to win the men's singles tennis title at the 1948 Australian Championships.

== Seeds ==
The seeded players are listed below. Adrian Quist is the champion; others show the round in which they were eliminated.

1. (Australia) John Bromwich (finalist)
2. (Australia) Adrian Quist (champion)
3. (Australia) Bill Sidwell (semifinals)
4. (Australia) Geoffrey Brown (semifinals)
5. (Australia) Colin Long (quarterfinals)
6. (Australia) Frank Sedgman (quarterfinals)
7. (Australia) Lionel Brodie (third round)
8. (Australia) Robert McCarthy (quarterfinals)
9. (United States) James Brink (third round)
10. (United States) Eddie Moylan (quarterfinals)

== Draw ==
=== Key ===
- Q = Qualifier
- WC = Wild card
- LL = Lucky loser
- r = Retired

=== Finals ===
Quarterfinals
1	(Australia) John Bromwich	6	6	6
6	(Australia) Frank Sedgman	2	4	4
4	(Australia) Geoffrey Brown	7	6	2	7
10	(United States) Eddie Moylan	5	2	6	5
5	(Australia) Colin Long	2	7	2	0
3	(Australia) Bill Sidwell	6	5	6	6
8	(Australia) Robert McCarthy	3	2	3
2	(Australia) Adrian Quist	6	6	6

Semifinals
1	(Australia) John Bromwich	3	2	6	6	7
4	(Australia) Geoffrey Brown	6	6	4	4	5
3	(Australia) Bill Sidwell	1	2	6	3
2	(Australia) Adrian Quist	6	6	1	6

Final
1	(Australia) John Bromwich	4	6	3	6	3
2	(Australia) Adrian Quist	6	3	6	2	6

=== Earlier rounds ===
==== Section 1 ====
First round
(Australia) Rogers	7	2	7
(Australia) Murrels	5	6	5
(Australia) Tregonning	8	9	9
(Australia) Pye	6	7	7

Second round
1	(Australia) Bromwich	6	6	6
(Australia) Lonergan	0	0	1
(Australia) Candy	2	5	5
(Australia) Rogers	6	7	7
6	(Australia) Sedgman	6	6	6
(Australia) Gaydon	2	2	3
(Australia) Crawford	6	6	3	6
(Australia) Tregonning	4	3	6	3

Third round
1	(Australia) Bromwich	6	6	6
(Australia) Rogers	1	1	0
6	(Australia) Sedgman	6	6	6
(Australia) Crawford	4	4	2

Quarterfinals
1	(Australia) Bromwich	6	6	6
6	(Australia) Sedgman	2	4	4

==== Section 2 ====
First round

Second round
4	(Australia) Brown	6	7	6
(Australia) Molloy	3	5	4
(Australia) Warhurst	6	6	1	0	8
(Australia) Stewart	2	1	6	6	6
7	(Australia) Brodie	1	6	6	6
(Australia) Wilderspin	6	3	3	4
(Australia) Worthington	7	2	2	6	1
10	(United States) Moylan	5	6	6	4	6

Third round
4	(Australia) Brown	6	7	6
(Australia) Warhurst	0	5	0
7	(Australia) Brodie	0	4	2
10	(United States) Moylan	6	6	6

Quarterfinals
4	(Australia) Brown	7	6	2	7
10	(United States) Moylan	5	2	6	5

==== Section 3 ====
First round

Second round
9	(United States) Brink	6	4	6	6	6
(Australia) Hopman	3	6	3	8	0
(Australia) Harrison	0	4	3
5	(Australia) Long	6	6	6
(Australia) Liddle	6	6	7	3	3
(Australia) Newcombe	1	4	9	6	6
(Australia) Bonner	4	6	4
3	(Australia) Sidwell	6	8	6

Third round
9	(United States) Brink	6	4	0	3
5	(Australia) Long	4	6	6	6
(Australia) Newcombe	1	3	1
3	(Australia) Sidwell	6	6	6

Quarterfinals
5	(Australia) Long	2	7	2	0
3	(Australia) Sidwell	6	5	6	6

==== Section 4 ====
First round
(Australia) Ewin	6	6	6
(Australia) Pym	4	2	3
(Australia) Heathcote	6	6	6
(Australia) Reid	4	4	3

Second round
(Australia) Ewin	3	2	3
(Australia) Tonkin	6	6	6
(Australia) Heathcote	2	2	3
8	(Australia) McCarthy	6	6	6
(Australia) McGregor	4	0	2
(Australia) Dart	6	6	6
(Australia) Vernon	0	0	2
2	(Australia) Quist	6	6	6

Third round
(Australia) Tonkin	7	1	6
8	(Australia) McCarthy	9	6	8
(Australia) Dart	1	3	4
2	(Australia) Quist	6	6	6

Quarterfinals
8	(Australia) McCarthy	3	2	3
2	(Australia) Quist	6	6	6

Preceded by 1947 U.S. National Championships	Grand Slam men's singles	Succeeded by 1948 French Championships
