= 1948 Australian Championships =

- Date: 16–26 January 1948
- Edition: 36th
- Category: Grand Slam (ITF)
- Surface: Grass
- Location: Melbourne, Australia
- Venue: Kooyong Stadium

Champions

Men's singles
- (Australia) Adrian Quist

Women's singles
- (Australia) Nancye Wynne Bolton

Men's doubles
- (Australia) John Bromwich / (Australia) Adrian Quist

Women's doubles
- (Australia) Thelma Coyne Long / (Australia) Nancye Wynne Bolton

Mixed doubles
- (Australia) Nancye Wynne Bolton / (Australia) Colin Long
- Australian Championships

The 1948 Australian Championships was a tennis tournament that took place on outdoor Grass courts at the Kooyong Stadium in Melbourne, Australia from 16 January to 26 January. It was the 36th edition of the Australian Championships (now known as the Australian Open), the 10th held in Melbourne, and the first Grand Slam tournament of the year. Australians Adrian Quist and Nancye Wynne Bolton won the singles titles.

== Finals ==
=== Men's singles ===
(Australia) Adrian Quist defeated (Australia) John Bromwich 6–4, 3–6, 6–3, 2–6, 6–3

=== Women's singles ===
(Australia) Nancye Wynne Bolton defeated (Australia) Marie Toomey 6–3, 6–1

=== Men's doubles ===
(Australia) John Bromwich / (Australia) Adrian Quist defeated (Australia) Colin Long / (Australia) Frank Sedgman 1–6, 3–6, 8–6, 6–3, 8–6

=== Women's doubles ===
(Australia) Thelma Coyne Long / (Australia) Nancye Wynne Bolton defeated (Australia) Mary Bevis / (Australia) Pat Jones 6–3, 6–3

=== Mixed doubles ===
(Australia) Nancye Wynne Bolton / (Australia) Colin Long defeated (Australia) Thelma Coyne Long / (Australia) Bill Sidwell 7–5, 4–6, 8–6

Preceded by 1947 U.S. National Championships	Grand Slams	Succeeded by 1948 French Championships
