= 1956 Australian Championships =

- Date: 20–30 January 1956
- Edition: 44th
- Category: Grand Slam (ITF)
- Surface: Grass
- Location: Brisbane, Australia
- Venue: Milton Courts

Champions

Men's singles
- (Australia) Lew Hoad

Women's singles
- (Australia) Mary Carter

Men's doubles
- (Australia) Lew Hoad / (Australia) Ken Rosewall

Women's doubles
- (Australia) Mary Bevis Hawton / (Australia) Thelma Coyne Long

Mixed doubles
- (Australia) Beryl Penrose / (Australia) Neale Fraser
- Australian Championships

The 1956 Australian Championships was a tennis tournament that took place on outdoor Grass courts at the Milton Courts, Brisbane, Australia from 20 January to 30 January. It was the 44th edition of the Australian Championships (now known as the Australian Open), the 4th held in Brisbane, and the first Grand Slam tournament of the year. The singles titles were won by Lew Hoad and Mary Carter Reitano.

== Champions ==
=== Men's singles ===
(Australia) Lew Hoad defeated (Australia) Ken Rosewall 6–4, 3–6, 6–4, 7–5

=== Women's singles ===
(Australia) Mary Carter defeated (Australia) Thelma Coyne Long 3–6, 6–2, 9–7

=== Men's doubles ===
(Australia) Lew Hoad / (Australia) Ken Rosewall defeated (Australia) Don Candy / (Australia) Mervyn Rose 10–8, 13–11, 6–4

=== Women's doubles ===
(Australia) Mary Bevis Hawton / (Australia) Thelma Coyne Long defeated (Australia) Mary Carter / (Australia) Beryl Penrose 6–2, 5–7, 9–7

=== Mixed doubles ===
(Australia) Beryl Penrose / (Australia) Neale Fraser defeated (Australia) Mary Bevis Hawton / (Australia) Roy Emerson 6–2, 6–4

Preceded by 1955 U.S. National Championships	Grand Slams	Succeeded by 1956 French Championships
