= H. T. M. Angwin =

Hugh Thomas Moffitt Angwin CMG (1888 – 13 September 1949) was Engineer-in-Chief of South Australia from 1936 to 1949.

== History ==
Hugh was born in Angaston, South Australia to (Wesleyan Methodist) Rev. Thomas Britton Angwin BA (−1913) and his wife Mary Jane Angwin, née Moffitt ( –1932). He was educated at Prince Alfred College, as were his two brothers, William Britton Angwin BSc (born 1886) and Harry Delmege Angwin (born 1892). After a stellar academic career he graduated from the University of Adelaide and the School of Mines with a BSc in 1910 and a Diploma of Electrical Engineering in 1911, which he exchanged for a BE. in 1913, after winning an Angas Scholarship in 1912.

He joined the Engineer-in-Chief's department in 1913, and for the next eleven years, apart from two years' service with the 1st AIF, worked as a draughtsman and design engineer under Rupert Victor Cutting (died 1958), designing locks for the River Murray. He became Assistant Construction Engineer in 1924 and Engineer for Water Supply in 1929. He succeeded Robert de Neufville Lucas (died 1944) as Chief Engineer of the SA Harbors Board in 1930 and became the Board's Deputy Commissioner in 1932. He was appointed Deputy Engineer-in-Chief of the Engineering and Water Supply (E.& W.S.) in 1935, then in 1936 succeeded John Henry Osborn Eaton (died 1948) as Engineer-in-Chief.

He was associated with the following important works:

- Mount Bold reservoir
- Metropolitan Flood Waters Scheme
- Morgan–Whyalla pipeline
- Barossa–Salisbury pipeline
- Mannum–Adelaide pipeline
- South Para Reservoir
- South-East Drainage Scheme

Other positions he held included:

- Chairman, Leigh Creek Coal Advisory Committee 1943–1949
- Deputy Commissioner for the River Murray 1946–1949
- Chairman, Electricity Trust of South Australia 1944? 1946?
- During WWII he was a director of Engineering in the civil defence force and a member of the State Camouflage Committee.
- He was also councillor of the Institute of Engineers (Aust.)
- He was a member of the Faculty of Engineering at Adelaide University and a member of the council of the School of Mines

He was awarded the CMG in 1944.

Angwin collapsed and died in an Adelaide store. He was buried at Centennial Park Cemetery. The Premier, Sir Thomas Playford said of him:

"I cannot pay too high a tribute to the work which Mr. Angwin accomplished for South Australia. He was a public service officer who had the highest ability. He combined outstanding technical knowledge with a pronounced gift for administration. He was one of the foremost citizens of South Australia and his loss will be deeply regretted by everybody who came in contact with him and by the State which has gained much from his work. The Government extends its sympathy to his wife and family in their loss."

Sir Malcolm McIntosh, who was associated with him for twenty years said:

"Mr. Angwin's life was the epitome of wisdom, dignity and service. Great as were his public services as Engineer-in-Chief in the Electricity Trust and the Harbors Board, they were not greater than his capacity to attract loyal devotion and support from all who served with him. He was always the first to acknowledge this support. He had great scientific gifts, but these did not transcend his other attributes. The State has been enriched by his services ... Those who had the privilege of fellow scholarship and friendship will also revere his memory and with his family mourn their loss."

== Family ==
He married Edna Turnbull ( – ) in 1928. They had two daughters:

- Enid Angwin ( – ) married Dr. Richard Bennett ( – ) on 11 February 1955
- Helen Angwin (c. 1932 – ) married Graham Polkinghorne ( – ) on 19 January 1955. She was one of South Australia's top tennis players.

They lived at 5 Lebanon Avenue, Glenunga
