= 1952 Australian Championships =

- Date: 18–28 January 1952
- Edition: 40th
- Category: Grand Slam (ITF)
- Surface: Grass
- Location: Adelaide, Australia
- Venue: Memorial Drive

Champions

Men's singles
- (Australia) Ken McGregor

Women's singles
- (Australia) Thelma Coyne Long

Men's doubles
- (Australia) Ken McGregor / (Australia) Frank Sedgman

Women's doubles
- (Australia) Thelma Coyne Long / (Australia) Nancye Wynne Bolton

Mixed doubles
- (Australia) Thelma Coyne Long / (Australia) George Worthington
- Australian Championships

The 1952 Australian Championships was a tennis tournament that took place on outdoor Grass courts at the Memorial Drive, Adelaide, Australia from 19 January to 28 January. It was the 40th edition of the Australian Championships (now known as the Australian Open), the 10th held in Adelaide, and the first Grand Slam tournament of the year. The singles titles were won by Australians Ken McGregor and Thelma Coyne Long.

== Finals ==
=== Men's singles ===
(Australia) Ken McGregor defeated (Australia) Frank Sedgman 7–5, 12–10, 2–6, 6–2

=== Women's singles ===
(Australia) Thelma Coyne Long defeated (Australia) Helen Angwin 6–2, 6–3

=== Men's doubles ===
(Australia) Ken McGregor / (Australia) Frank Sedgman defeated (Australia) Don Candy / (Australia) Mervyn Rose 6–4, 7–5, 6–3

=== Women's doubles ===
(Australia) Thelma Coyne Long / (Australia) Nancye Wynne Bolton defeated (Australia) Alison Burton Baker / (Australia) Mary Bevis Hawton 6–1, 6–1

=== Mixed doubles ===
(Australia) Thelma Coyne Long / (Australia) George Worthington defeated (Australia) Gwen Thiele / (Australia) Tom Warhurst 9–7, 7–5

Preceded by 1951 U.S. National Championships	Grand Slams	Succeeded by 1952 French Championships
