= Joyce Wood =

Australian tennis player

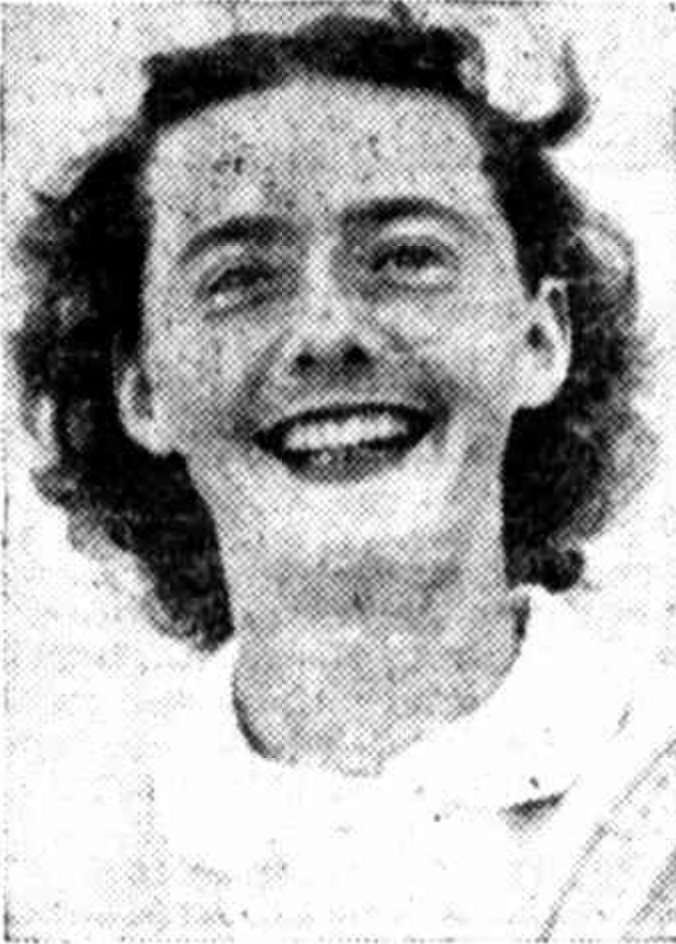
- Joyce Wood in 1948
- Born: Caulfield, Victoria, Australia

Singles

Grand Slam singles results
- Australian Open: First (1938, 1939, 1940)

Doubles

Grand Slam doubles results
- Australian Open: First (1938, 1939, 1940; with Alison Burton)

Joyce Beryl Wood was an Australian tennis player. She and Alison Burton won the girls' doubles competition at the Australian Championships (now the Australian Open) in 1938, 1939 and 1940. Wood also won the girls' single competition at the Australian Championships in the same three years.

== Biography ==
Wood was from Caulfield, Victoria. In 1943, she married fellow tennis player Max McDermott in Melbourne. Following their marriage, the couple relocated to Perth, Western Australia.

After the birth of her daughter, Kay Suzanne McDermott in 1945, Wood continued to compete in tournaments, including defending her women's singles title in Perth in April 1946.
