= Hazel Redick-Smith =

South African tennis player

- Country (sports): South Africa
- Born: 21 May 1926; South Africa
- Died: 23 June 1996 (age 70)
- Plays: Right–handed

Singles

Grand Slam singles results
- Australian Open: QF (1954)
- French Open: SF (1952)
- Wimbledon: 4R (1955)

Doubles

Grand Slam doubles results
- Australian Open: F (1952)
- French Open: F (1954)
- Wimbledon: QF (1955)

Grand Slam mixed doubles results
- Australian Open: 2R (1954)
- Wimbledon: 3R (1954)

Hazel Redick-Smith (21 May 1926 – 23 June 1996) was a female former tennis player from South Africa who was active in the 1950s.

== Career ==
Redick-Smith teamed with fellow South African Julia Wipplinger to reach the doubles final at the 1952 French Championships. In the final they were defeated in straight sets by Doris Hart and Shirley Fry. They again reached the doubles final at a Grand Slam tournament two years later at the 1954 Australian Championships. This time the Australian team of Mary Bevis Hawton and Beryl Penrose won in straight sets. Her best Grand Slam performance in the singles was reaching the semifinals at the 1952 French Championships and the fourth round at the 1955 Wimbledon Championships.

In April 1951, she was runner-up to Sheila Summers in the singles event of the South African Championships. In June 1952 she won the finals of the singles event at the Kent Championships in Beckenham and the London Grass Court Championships, played at the Queens Club. In July 1952 she won the singles title at the Swedish Open in Båstad beating by her doubles partner Julia Wipplinger in straight sets. She was part of a South African team, with Julia Wipplinger, Ian Vermaak, Owen Williams and Abe Segal who went on a tour in Australia in February and March 1954. In 1953, 1954 and 1955 Redick-Smith won the singles title at the South African Championships. In July 1955 she won the singles title at the Midlands Counties Championships in Birmingham, England after defeating Beryl Penrose in the final in straight sets. The week thereafter she went on to win the singles title of the Swiss Championships in Gstaad.

== Grand Slam finals ==
=== Doubles (2 losses) ===
| Result | Year | Championship | Surface | Partner | Opponents | Score |
|---|---|---|---|---|---|---|
| Loss | 1952 | French Championships | Clay | (South Africa) Julia Wipplinger | (United States) Doris Hart (United States) Shirley Fry | 5–7, 1–6 |
| Loss | 1954 | Australian Championships | Grass | (South Africa) Julia Wipplinger | (Australia) Mary Bevis Hawton (Australia) Beryl Penrose | 3–6, 6–8 |
