= Margaret H. O'Donnell =

Australian tennis player

Margaret O'Donnell
- Full name: Margaret H. O'Donnell
- Country (sports): AUS
- Born: 1935; Toorak, Australia
- Turned pro: 1949 (amateur tour)
- Retired: 1958

Singles

Grand Slam singles results
- Australian Open: 3R (1952, 1955)
- Wimbledon: 1R (1956)

Doubles

Grand Slam doubles results
- French Open: 3R (1956)
- Wimbledon: 1R (1956)

Grand Slam mixed doubles results
- Wimbledon: 1R (1956)

Margaret H. O'Donnell (born 1935) is a retired Australian tennis player who competed at the Australian Championships, French Championships and Wimbledon Championships between 1952 and 1956. She was active from 1949 to 1958.

== Career ==
O'Donnell played her first tournament in 1949 at the South Australian Championships in Adelaide where she lost in the first round to Sadie Berryman. Between 1952 and 1956 she played on the European ILTF circuit where she competed at doubles in the French Championships, and Wimbledon Championships, and the Ulster Grass Court Championships in 1956. In 1958 she was a losing finalist in the women's doubles at the Connaught Hard Court Championships partnering with New Zealand's Ruia Morrison.
