= Tom Warhurst Sr. =

Australian tennis player

Tom Warhurst
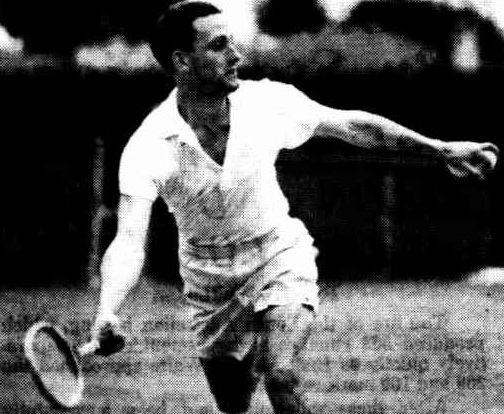
- Country (sports): Australia
- Born: 10 February 1917; Adelaide, South Australia
- Died: 23 January 2004 (aged 86)

Singles

Grand Slam singles results
- Australian Open: QF (1949)

Doubles

Grand Slam doubles results
- Australian Open: QF (1946, 1948, 1949, 1952)

Mixed doubles

Grand Slam mixed doubles results
- Australian Open: F (1952)

Hubert Thomas Warhurst (10 February 1917 – 23 January 2004) was an Australian tennis player who competed in six Australian Championships. He also played Australian rules football with Norwood in the South Australian National Football League (SANFL). He is the father of John Warhurst and Tom Warhurst, Jr.

== Career ==
Warhurst started his career at Norwood in 1935, having completed his education at Xavier College in Melbourne where he held the Victorian Public School's high jump record for two years. A key position player, he was usually played as a defender but could be seen in the forward line.

In 1938, Warhurst made his first appearance in the Australian Championships and entered in the singles, doubles and mixed doubles but failed to win a match.

He shared the Norwood captaincy in 1939 and 1940, when he was at his peak as a player. He won his club's best and fairest award in 1939 and also fell one vote short of winning the Magarey Medal. Warhurst, a three-time South Australian interstate football representative, then lost some of his best sporting years to the war.

From 1940 to 1945, Warhurst served with the 27/7th Field Regiment of the Australian Army, in the Middle East, North Africa and Dutch East Indies. A sergeant, towards the end of the war he took part in the Battle of Tarakan.

After the war, he returned to football and participated in the club's 1946 premiership team, as a full-back. He amassed 94 SANFL games by the time he announced his retirement in 1947.

He played his best tennis post-war and in 1946 reached the quarterfinals of the men's doubles in both 1946 and 1948, with his partner Max Bonner. In 1949 he progressed to the quarterfinals in the singles, beating eighth seed Jack Crawford in five sets. He was then eliminated by Bill Sidwell, one of the tournament favourites. Despite never registering a Championship win in mixed doubles, Warhurst competed in the 1952 final, as it was the only match that took place. The combination of Warhurst and Gwen Thiele lost the final in straight sets.

== Grand Slam tournament finals ==
=== Mixed doubles (1 loss) ===
| Result | Year | Championship | Surface | Partner | Opponents | Score |
|---|---|---|---|---|---|---|
| Loss | 1952 | Australian Championships | Grass | (Australia) Gwen Thiele | (Australia) Thelma Coyne Long (Australia) George Worthington | 7–9, 5–7 |
