= Helen Angwin =

Australian tennis player

- Country (sports): Australia
- Born: c. 1931; SA, Australia

Singles

Grand Slam singles results
- Australian Open: F (1952)

Doubles

Grand Slam doubles results
- Australian Open: SF (1953)

Grand Slam mixed doubles results
- Australian Open: 2R (1954)

Helen Angwin (born c. 1931) is an Australian former tennis player who was active in the first half of the 1950s.

== Career ==
In 1952 she was runner-up in the singles event of the Australian Championship, losing the final in straight sets to compatriot Thelma Coyne Long. In the semifinal she had defeated first-seeded and reigning champion Nancye Wynne Bolton. In the doubles event she reached the semifinal in 1953 together with Gwen Thiele. In total she participated in five editions of the Australian Championships between 1949 and 1954.

In January 1952 Angwin won the singles title at the South Australian Championships in Adelaide, defeating Gwen Thiele in the final in three sets. She lost the final of the 1954 edition in three sets to Jenny Staley.

In September 1954 she announced her retirement from tennis due to her upcoming marriage.

== Personal life ==
Helen Angwin is the youngest of two daughters of Hugh Thomas Moffitt Angwin (1888–1949). She married Graham Polkinghorne on 19 January 1955 in Adelaide.

== Grand Slam finals ==
=== Singles (1 runner-up) ===
Result	Year	Championship	Surface	Opponent	Score
Loss	1952	Australian Championships	Grass	(Australia) Thelma Coyne Long	2–6, 3–6
