= Marie Toomey =

Australian tennis player (1923–2014)

Marie Toomey (3 October 1923 – 29 March 2014) was a tennis player from Australia who reached the women's singles final of the 1948 Australian Championships, losing to Nancye Wynne Bolton 6–3, 6–1. Toomey teamed with Doris Hart to reach the women's doubles final of the 1949 Australian Championships, losing to Bolton and Thelma Coyne Long 6–0, 6–1.

== Grand Slam finals ==
=== Singles (1 runner-up) ===
Result	Year	Championship	Surface	Opponent	Score
Loss	1948	Australian Championships	Grass	(Australia) Nancye Wynne Bolton	3–6, 1–6

=== Doubles (1 runner-up) ===
Result	Year	Championship	Surface	Partner	Opponents	Score
Loss	1949	Australian Championships	Grass	(United States) Doris Hart	(Australia) Nancye Wynne Bolton (Australia) Thelma Coyne Long	0–6, 1–6

== Grand Slam singles tournament timeline ==
Key
W	F	SF	QF	#R	RR	Q#	DNQ	A	NH

(W) winner; (F) finalist; (SF) semifinalist; (QF) quarterfinalist; (#R) rounds 4, 3, 2, 1; (RR) round-robin stage; (Q#) qualification round; (DNQ) did not qualify; (A) absent; (NH) not held; (SR) strike rate (events won / competed); (W–L) win–loss record.

Tournament	1946^{1}	1947^{1}	1948	1949	1950	Career SR
Australian Championships	SF	QF	F	QF	2R	0 / 5
French Championships	A	A	A	A	A	0 / 0
Wimbledon	A	A	A	A	A	0 / 0
U.S. Championships	A	A	A	A	A	0 / 0
SR	0 / 1	0 / 1	0 / 1	0 / 1	0 / 1	0 / 5

^{1}In 1946 and 1947, the French Championships were held after Wimbledon.

== See also ==
- Performance timelines for all female tennis players since 1978 who reached at least one Grand Slam final
