= Thelma Coyne Long =

Australian tennis player (1918–2015)

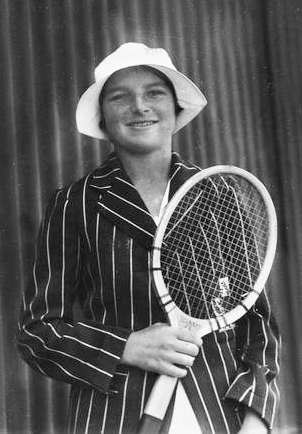
- Long in 1932
- Full name: Thelma Dorothy Coyne Long
- Country (sports): Australia
- Born: 14 October 1918 Sydney, Australia
- Died: 13 April 2015 (aged 96) Sydney, Australia
- Plays: Right-handed
- Int. Tennis HoF: 2013 (member page)

Singles
- Highest ranking: No. 7 (1952, Lance Tingay)

Grand Slam singles results
- Australian Open: W (1952, 1954)
- French Open: QF (1951)
- Wimbledon: QF (1952)
- US Open: QF (1952)

Grand Slam doubles results
- Australian Open: W (1936, 1937, 1938, 1939, 1940, 1947, 1948, 1949, 1951, 1952, 1956, 1958)
- French Open: F (1958)
- Wimbledon: F (1957)
- US Open: SF (1958)

Grand Slam mixed doubles results
- Australian Open: W (1951, 1952, 1954, 1955)
- French Open: W (1956)
- Wimbledon: F (1952)
- US Open: F (1938, 1952)

Thelma Dorothy Coyne Long (née Coyne; 14 October 1918 – 13 April 2015) was an Australian tennis player and one of the female players who dominated Australian tennis from the mid-1930s to the 1950s. During her career, she won 19 Grand Slam tournament titles. In 2013, Long was inducted into the International Tennis Hall of Fame.

== Tennis career ==
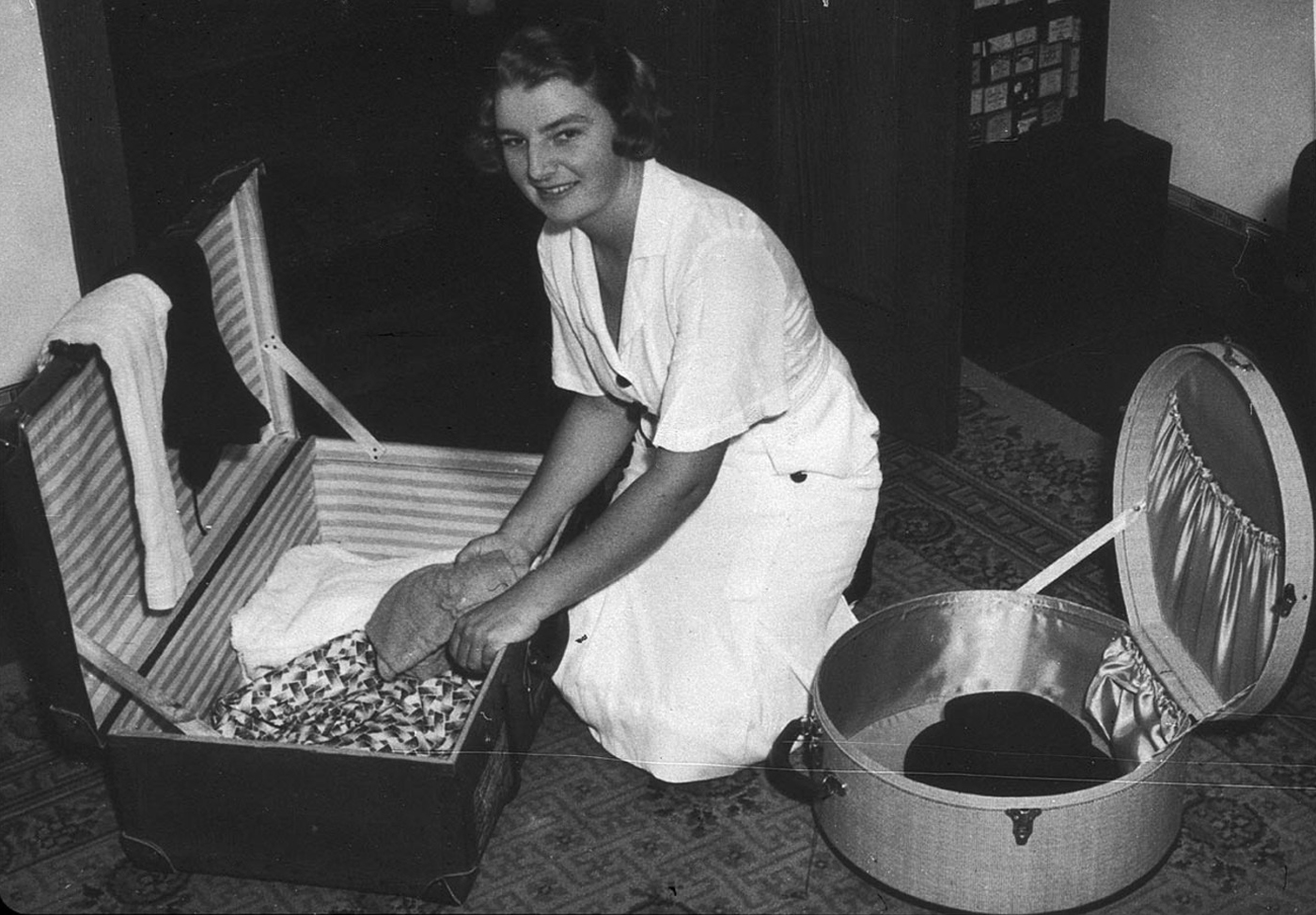
Thelma Coyne packing for her overseas tour in 1938 as a member of the Australian Women's Tennis Team.

At the Australian Championships, Long won singles titles in 1952 and 1954 and was a singles finalist in 1940, 1951, 1955 and 1956. In women's doubles, she won 10 titles with Nancye Wynne Bolton (1936, 1937, 1938, 1939, 1940, 1947, 1948, 1949, 1951 and 1952) and two titles with Mary Bevis Hawton (1956 and 1958). Long was a women's doubles finalist with Bolton in 1946 and 1950. She won mixed doubles titles in 1951, 1952 and 1955 with George Worthington and in 1954 with Rex Hartwig. She was a mixed doubles finalist in 1948 with Bill Sidwell.

At Wimbledon, Long was a women's doubles finalist in 1957 with Hawton and a mixed doubles finalist in 1952 with Enrique Morea. At 52, Long teamed with Lorraine Coghlan to lose in the first round of women's doubles at Wimbledon in 1971.

At the French Championships, Long was a women's doubles finalist in 1958 with Hawton, won the mixed doubles title in 1956 with Luis Ayala, and was a mixed doubles finalist in 1951 with Mervyn Rose.

At the 1953 tournament in Cincinnati, Long won the singles title (defeating Anita Kanter 7–5, 6–2 in the final) and the women's doubles title with Kanter.

According to Lance Tingay of The Daily Telegraph and the Daily Mail, Long was ranked in the world top 10 in 1952 and 1954 (no rankings issued from 1940 to 1945), reaching a career high of World No. 7 in these rankings in 1952.

Long became a teaching professional in 1960 and spent many years coaching junior players in New South Wales. In 1985, her achievements were recognised by Tennis NSW when she was awarded Life Membership of the State Association.

=== Honours and awards ===
On 30 August 2000, Long was awarded the Australian Sports Medal. She was inducted into the Australian Tennis Hall of Fame in a ceremony at Melbourne Park during the Australian Open on Australia Day in 2002. In 2013, she was inducted into the International Tennis Hall of Fame.

== Personal life ==
She was born in Sydney, Australia, on 14 October 1918, the only child of Tom and Dorrie Coyne and was schooled at the Sydney Girls High School.

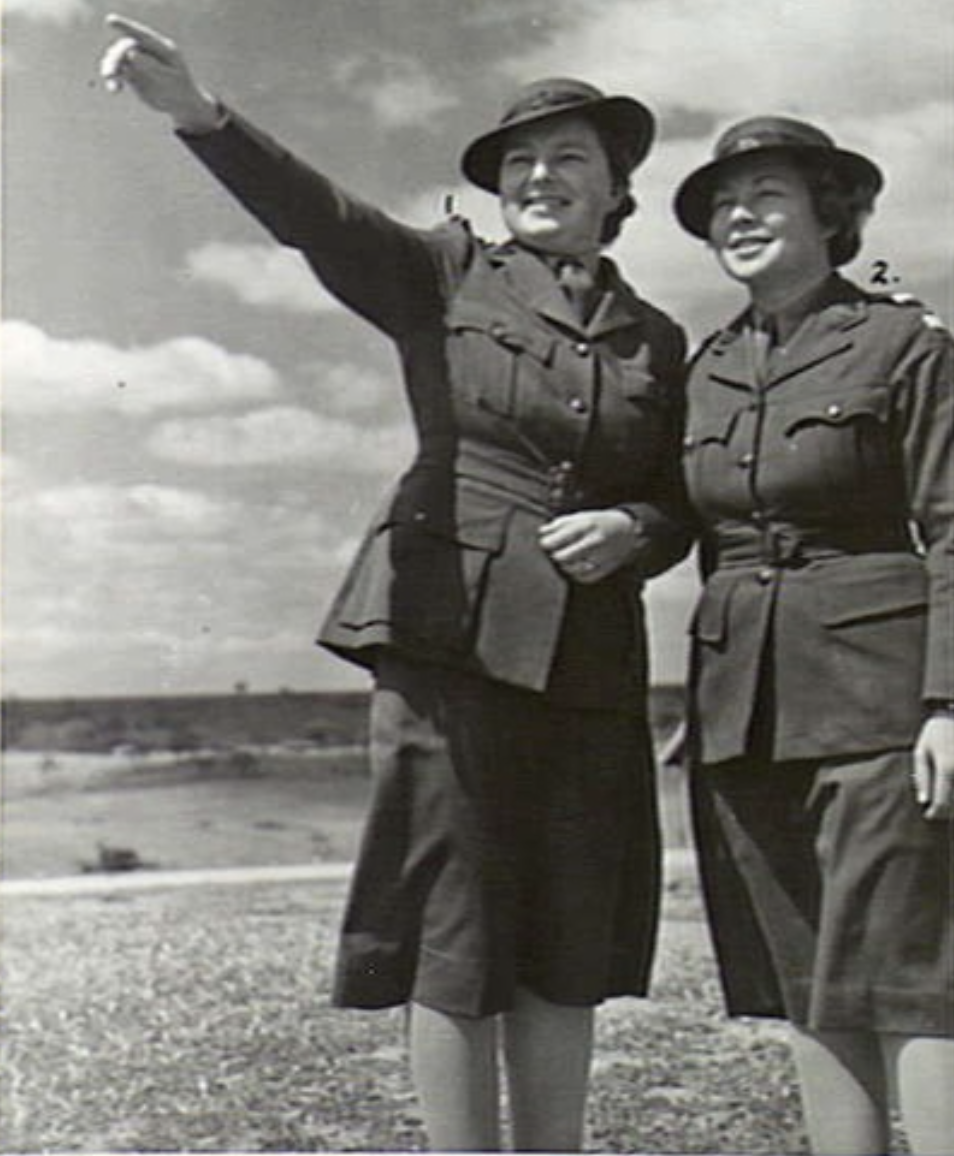
Captain Thelma Long (left) with Lt Benporath, in Victoria, 1944

On 30 January 1941, she married Maurice Newton Long of Melbourne. The marriage did not continue after the end of the Second World War.

In May 1941, during the Second World War, Long joined the Red Cross as a transport driver and worked in Melbourne. On 19 February 1942, she joined the Australian Women's Army Service (AWAS) and rose to captain in April 1944. For her service in the AWAS, she was awarded the War Medal 1939–1945 and the Australia Service Medal 1939–1945.

Long volunteered at the State Library of New South Wales and received the Volunteer Service Award in 1999.

Coyne died on 13 April 2015 at the age of 96.

== Grand Slam tournament finals ==
=== Singles: 6 (2 wins, 4 losses) ===
| Result | Year | Championship | Surface | Opponent | Score |
|---|---|---|---|---|---|
| Loss | 1940 | Australian Championships | Grass | (Australia) Nancye Wynne Bolton | 7–5, 4–6, 0–6 |
| Loss | 1951 | Australian Championships | Grass | (Australia) Nancye Wynne Bolton | 1–6, 5–7 |
| Win | 1952 | Australian Championships | Grass | (Australia) Helen Angwin | 6–2, 6–3 |
| Win | 1954 | Australian Championships | Grass | (Australia) Jenny Staley Hoad | 6–3, 6–4 |
| Loss | 1955 | Australian Championships | Grass | (Australia) Beryl Penrose | 4–6, 3–6 |
| Loss | 1956 | Australian Championships | Grass | (Australia) Mary Carter | 6–3, 2–6, 7–9 |

=== Doubles: 16 (12 wins, 4 losses) ===
| Result | Year | Championship | Surface | Partner | Opponents | Score |
|---|---|---|---|---|---|---|
| Win | 1936 | Australian Championships | Grass | (Australia) Nancye Wynne Bolton | (Australia) May Blik (Australia) Katherine Woodward | 6–2, 6–4 |
| Win | 1937 | Australian Championships | Grass | (Australia) Nancye Wynne Bolton | (Australia) Nell Hall Hopman (Australia) Emily Hood Westacott | 6–2, 6–2 |
| Win | 1938 | Australian Championships | Grass | (Australia) Nancye Wynne Bolton | (United States) Dorothy Bundy Cheney (United States) Dorothy Workman | 9–7, 6–4 |
| Win | 1939 | Australian Championships | Grass | (Australia) Nancye Wynne Bolton | (Australia) May Hardcastle (Australia) Nell Hall Hopman | 7–5, 6–4 |
| Win | 1940 | Australian Championships | Grass | (Australia) Nancye Wynne Bolton | (Australia) Joan Hartigan (Australia) Emily Niemayer | 7–5, 6–2 |
| Loss | 1946 | Australian Championships | Grass | (Australia) Nancye Wynne Bolton | (Australia) Joyce Fitch (Australia) Mary Bevis Hawton | 7–9, 4–6 |
| Win | 1947 | Australian Championships | Grass | (Australia) Nancye Wynne Bolton | (Australia) Joyce Fitch (Australia) Mary Bevis Hawton | 6–3, 6–3 |
| Win | 1948 | Australian Championships | Grass | (Australia) Nancye Wynne Bolton | (Australia) Pat Jones (Australia) Mary Bevis Hawton | 6–3, 6–3 |
| Win | 1949 | Australian Championships | Grass | (Australia) Nancye Wynne Bolton | (United States) Doris Hart (Australia) Marie Toomey | 6–0, 6–1 |
| Loss | 1950 | Australian Championships | Grass | (Australia) Nancye Wynne Bolton | (United States) Louise Brough (United States) Doris Hart | 2–6, 6–2, 3–6 |
| Win | 1951 | Australian Championships | Grass | (Australia) Nancye Wynne Bolton | (Australia) Joyce Fitch (Australia) Mary Bevis Hawton | 6–2, 6–1 |
| Win | 1952 | Australian Championships | Grass | (Australia) Nancye Wynne Bolton | (Australia) Allison Burton Baker (Australia) Mary Bevis Hawton | 6–1, 6–1 |
| Win | 1956 | Australian Championships | Grass | (Australia) Mary Hawton | (Australia) Mary Carter Reitano (Australia) Beryl Penrose | 6–2, 5–7, 9–7 |
| Loss | 1957 | Wimbledon | Grass | (Australia) Mary Hawton | (United States) Althea Gibson (United States) Darlene Hard | 1–6, 2–6 |
| Win | 1958 | Australian Championships | Grass | (Australia) Mary Hawton | (Australia) Lorraine Coghlan (United Kingdom) Angela Mortimer | 7–5, 6–8, 6–2 |
| Loss | 1958 | French Championships | Clay | (Australia) Mary Hawton | (Mexico) Yola Ramírez (Mexico) Rosie Reyes | 4–6, 5–7 |

=== Mixed doubles (5 wins, 3 losses) ===
| Result | Year | Championship | Surface | Partner | Opponents | Score |
|---|---|---|---|---|---|---|
| Loss | 1938 | U.S. Championships | Grass | (Australia) John Bromwich | (United States) Alice Marble (United States) Don Budge | 1–6, 2–6 |
| Win | 1951 | Australian Championships | Grass | (Australia) George Worthington | (Australia) Clare Proctor (Australia) Jack May | 6–4, 3–6, 6–2 |
| Win | 1952 | Australian Championships | Grass | (Australia) George Worthington | (Australia) Gwen Thiele (Australia) Tom Warhurst | 9–7, 7–5 |
| Loss | 1952 | Wimbledon | Grass | (Argentina) Enrique Morea | (United States) Doris Hart (Australia) Frank Sedgman | 6–4, 6–3, 6–4 |
| Loss | 1952 | U.S. Championships | Grass | (Australia) Lew Hoad | (United States) Doris Hart (Australia) Frank Sedgman | 3–6, 5–7 |
| Win | 1954 | Australian Championships | Grass | (Australia) Rex Hartwig | (Australia) Beryl Penrose (Australia) John Bromwich | 4–6, 6–1, 6–2 |
| Win | 1955 | Australian Championships | Grass | (Australia) George Worthington | (Australia) Jenny Staley (Australia) Lew Hoad | 6–2, 6–1 |
| Win | 1956 | French Championships | Clay | (Chile) Luis Ayala | (United States) Doris Hart (Australia) Bob Howe | 4–6, 6–4, 6–1 |

== Grand Slam singles tournament timeline ==
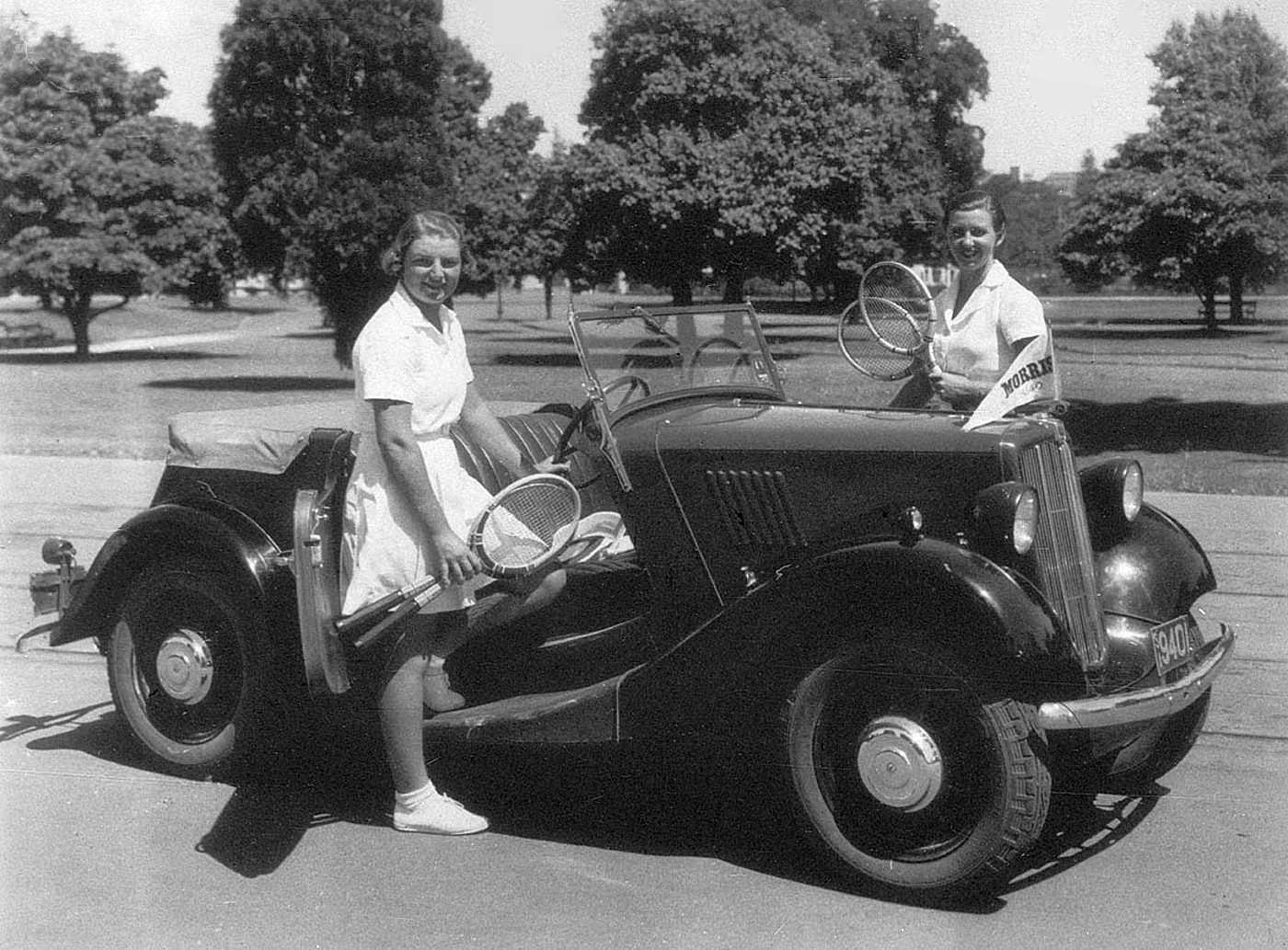
Thelma Coyne (l) and Nancye Wynne Bolton (r) in Adelaide (1938)

Key
| W | F | SF | QF | #R | RR | Q# | DNQ | A | NH |

(W) winner; (F) finalist; (SF) semifinalist; (QF) quarterfinalist; (#R) rounds 4, 3, 2, 1; (RR) round-robin stage; (Q#) qualification round; (DNQ) did not qualify; (A) absent; (NH) not held; (SR) strike rate (events won / competed); (W–L) win–loss record.

R = tournament restricted to French nationals and held under German occupation.

| Tournament | 1935 | 1936 | 1937 | 1938 | 1939 | 1940 | 1941 – 1944 | 1945 | 1946^{1} | 1947^{1} | 1948 | 1949 | 1950 | 1951 | 1952 | 1953 | 1954 | 1955 | 1956 | 1957 | 1958 | 1959 | SR | W–L | Win % |
|---|---|---|---|---|---|---|---|---|---|---|---|---|---|---|---|---|---|---|---|---|---|---|---|---|---|
| Australian Championships | 1R | SF | SF | QF | SF | F | NH | NH | QF | SF | 2R^{2} | SF | QF | F | W | A | W | F | F | A | 2R | 1R | 2 / 18 | 46–14 | 76.7 |
| French Championships | A | A | A | 2R | A | NH | R | A | A | A | A | A | A | QF | A | A | A | A | 3R | A | 3R | A | 0 / 4 | 7–3 | 70.0 |
| Wimbledon | A | A | A | 3R | A | NH | NH | NH | A | A | A | 4R | 3R | 1R^{3} | QF | A | A | A | 1R | 1R | 4R | A | 0 / 8 | 13–7 | 65.0 |
| U.S. Championships | A | A | A | 3R | A | A | A | A | A | A | A | A | A | A | QF | 3R | A | A | A | A | 2R | A | 0 / 4 | 8–4 | 66.7 |
| Win–loss | 0–1 | 2–1 | 3–1 | 6–3 | 3–1 | 3–1 | | | 2–1 | 3–1 | 0–0 | 6–2 | 4–2 | 7–2 | 11–2 | 2–1 | 5–0 | 4–1 | 6–3 | 0–1 | 7–3 | 0–1 | 2 / 34 | 74–28 | 72.5 |

^{1} In 1946 and 1947, the French Championships were held after Wimbledon.
^{2,3} Coyne did not play. Her opponent got a walkover.

== See also ==
- Performance timelines for all female tennis players since 1978 who reached at least one Grand Slam final
