= Beryl Penrose =

Australian tennis player (1930–2021)

- Full name: Beryl Penrose Collier
- Country (sports): Australia
- Born: 22 December 1930 Sydney, Australia
- Died: 20 June 2021 (aged 90)
- Plays: Right–handed (one-handed backhand)

Singles
- Highest ranking: No. 5 (1955 Lance Tingay)

Grand Slam singles results
- Australian Open: W (1955)
- French Open: QF (1955)
- Wimbledon: QF (1955)

Doubles

Grand Slam doubles results
- Australian Open: W (1954, 1955)
- French Open: SF (1955)
- Wimbledon: 3R (1955)

Mixed doubles

Grand Slam mixed doubles results
- Australian Open: W (1956)
- French Open: SF (1952, 1955)
- Wimbledon: SF (1955)

Beryl Penrose (22 December 1930 – 20 June 2021) was an Australian international tennis player. She competed in the Australian Open from 1950 to 1957. Penrose won the singles title in 1955, defeating compatriot Thelma Coyne Long in the final in straight sets.

In January 1948, she won the Australian girls singles title. In July 1952, she won the singles title at the Welsh Championship.

Her best results came in 1955, aged 24, when in addition to her Australian success, she reached the quarterfinals at the French and Wimbledon Championships. While overseas, Penrose reached four finals, including winning the German Championships against Erika Vollmer.

She was rated as high as fifth in the world in the 1955 rankings.

In 1957, she married and retired from her tennis career.

In 2017, she was inducted into the Australian Tennis Hall of Fame. Her grandson, James Duckworth, is an Australian tennis professional.

== Grand Slam finals ==
=== Singles (1 win) ===
Result	Year	Championship	Surface	Opponent	Score
Win	1955	Australian Championships	Grass	(Australia) Thelma Coyne Long	6–4, 6–3

=== Doubles (2 wins, 2 losses) ===
Result	Year	Championship	Surface	Partner	Opponents	Score
Loss	1953	Australian Championships	Grass	(Australia) Mary Bevis Hawton	(United States) Maureen Connolly (United States) Julia Sampson	4–6, 2–6
Win	1954	Australian Championships	Grass	(Australia) Mary Bevis Hawton	(South Africa) Julia Wipplinger (South Africa) Hazel Redick-Smith	6–3, 8–6
Win	1955	Australian Championships	Grass	(Australia) Mary Bevis Hawton	(Australia) Nell Hall Hopman (Australia) Gwen Thiele	7–5, 6–1
Loss	1956	Australian Championships	Grass	(Australia) Mary Carter Reitano	(Australia) Mary Bevis Hawton (Australia) Thelma Coyne Long	2–6, 7–5, 7–9

=== Mixed doubles (1 win, 1 loss) ===
Result	Year	Championship	Surface	Partner	Opponents	Score
Loss	1954	Australian Championships	Grass	(Australia) John Bromwich	(Australia) Thelma Coyne Long (Australia) Rex Hartwig	6–4, 1–6, 2–6
Win	1955	Australian Championships	Grass	(Australia) Neale Fraser	(Australia) Mary Bevis Hawton (Australia) Roy Emerson	6–2, 6–4
