= Alison Burton =

Australian tennis player

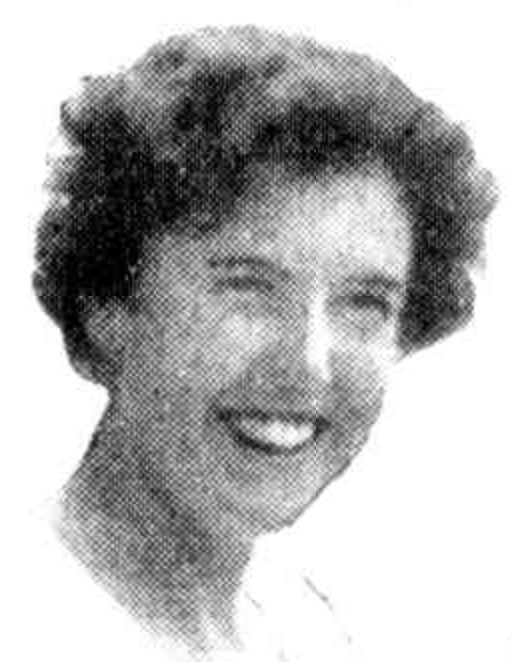
Alison Burton in 1940

Alison Violet Burton (3 November 1921 – 9 June 2014) was a left-handed Australian tennis player. She and Joyce Wood won the girls' doubles competition at the Australian Championships (now the Australian Open) in 1938, 1939 and 1940.

== Biography ==
Burton was born and grew up in Melbourne, Australia. She was educated at Huntingtower School and the University of Melbourne, being awarded a tennis blue in 1941.

As a schoolgirl, Burton represented the state of Victoria in the 1938 and 1939 Wilson Cup matches. In 1938 and 1939 she also won the Victorian junior championship and was runner-up for the Australian title.

In 1952, she partnered with Mary Bevis Hawton and reached the finals of the women's doubles at the Australian Championships.

=== Personal life ===
On 17 September 1946, Burton married fellow Australian tennis player, Robert (Bob) Baker at Lincoln College Chapel, Oxford, England. They later returned to Tasmania, Baker's home state, and lived in Hobart. Their daughter, Barbara Baker, became a judge of the Federal Circuit Court, and in 2021 was appointed as the 29th Governor of Tasmania.

Burton died in South Hobart in 2014.
