= Mary Hawton =

Australian tennis player

- Country (sports): Australia
- Born: 4 September 1924; Sydney, Australia
- Died: 18 January 1981 (aged 56); Sydney, Australia
- Plays: Right-handed

Singles

Grand Slam singles results
- Australian Open: SF (1948, 1952, 1953, 1954, 1956, 1959)
- French Open: 4R (1960, 1962)
- Wimbledon: 4R (1958)
- US Open: QF (1957)

Doubles

Grand Slam doubles results
- Australian Open: W (1946, 1954, 1955, 1956, 1958)
- French Open: F (1958)
- Wimbledon: F (1957)
- US Open: SF (1957, 1958, 1960)

Grand Slam mixed doubles results
- Australian Open: W (1958)
- French Open: QF (1960, 1962)
- Wimbledon: 3R (1957, 1960)
- US Open: 2R (1957)

Mary Renetta Hawton (née Bevis; 4 September 1924 – 18 January 1981) was a tennis player from Australia. Her career ranged from the 1940s to the 1950s.

Hawton won the women's doubles title at the Australian Championships five times. In 1958 she also won the mixed doubles title together with compatriot Robert Howe.

In 1948, she married Keith Ernest Hawton.

She was captain of the Australian Fed Cup team in 1979 and 1980 and director of the NSW Tennis Association.

In 1979, Hawton published a book titled How to Play Winning Tennis. She died on 18 January 1981 in Sydney, Australia.

The Mary Hawton Trophy, the prize for the winner of the Australian teams championships for girls, was named after her, as is Hawton Place, in the Canberra suburb of Chisholm.

== Career ==
Mary Hawton found much success in Australia at the Australian Championships. She made it to the semifinals in singles six times in 1948, 1952, 1953, 1954, 1956 and 1959. Hawton reached 12 finals in Australia, eight of these being consecutive. She also reached the doubles finals at the Wimbledon and French Championships in 1957 and 1958 with Australian Thelma Coyne Long. Hawton ended her career with six Grand Slam titles: five in women's doubles and one in mixed doubles.

== Grand Slam finals ==
=== Doubles: 14 (5–9) ===
Result	Year	Championship	Surface	Partner	Opponents	Score
Win	1946	Australian Championships	Grass	(Australia) Joyce Fitch	(Australia) Nancye Wynne Bolton (Australia) Thelma Coyne Long	9–7, 6–4
Loss	1947	Australian Championships	Grass	(Australia) Joyce Fitch	(Australia) Nancye Wynne Bolton (Australia) Thelma Coyne Long	3–6, 3–6
Loss	1948	Australian Championships	Grass	(Australia) Pat Jones	(Australia) Nancye Wynne Bolton (Australia) Thelma Coyne Long	3–6, 3–6
Loss	1951	Australian Championships	Grass	(Australia) Joyce Fitch	(Australia) Nancye Wynne Bolton (Australia) Thelma Coyne Long	2–6, 1–6
Loss	1952	Australian Championships	Grass	(Australia) Alison Burton	(Australia) Nancye Wynne Bolton (Australia) Thelma Coyne Long	1–6, 1–6
Loss	1953	Australian Championships	Grass	(Australia) Beryl Penrose	(United States) Maureen Connolly (United States) Julia Sampson	4–6, 2–6
Win	1954	Australian Championships	Grass	(Australia) Beryl Penrose	(South Africa) Hazel Redick-Smith (South Africa) Julia Wipplinger	6–3, 8–6
Win	1955	Australian Championships	Grass	(Australia) Beryl Penrose	(Australia) Nell Hall Hopman (Australia) Gwen Thiele	7–5, 6–1
Win	1956	Australian Championships	Grass	(Australia) Thelma Coyne Long	(Australia) Mary Carter Reitano (Australia) Beryl Penrose	6–2, 5–7, 9–7
Loss	1957	Australian Championships	Grass	(Australia) Fay Muller	(United States) Shirley Fry (United States) Althea Gibson	2–6, 1–6
Loss	1957	Wimbledon	Grass	(Australia) Thelma Coyne Long	(United States) Althea Gibson (United States) Darlene Hard	1–6, 2–6
Win	1958	Australian Championships	Grass	(Australia) Thelma Coyne Long	(Australia) Lorraine Coghlan (United Kingdom) Angela Mortimer	7–5, 6–8, 6–2
Loss	1958	French Championships	Clay	(Australia) Thelma Coyne Long	(Mexico) Yola Ramírez (Mexico) Rosie Reyes	4–6, 5–7
Loss	1961	Australian Championships	Grass	(Australia) Jan Lehane	(Australia) Mary Carter Reitano (Australia) Margaret Smith	4–6, 6–3, 5–7

=== Mixed doubles: 2 (1–1) ===
Result	Year	Championship	Surface	Partner	Opponents	Score
Loss	1956	Australian Championships	Grass	(Australia) Roy Emerson	(Australia) Beryl Penrose (Australia) Neale Fraser	2–6, 4–6
Win	1958	Australian Championships	Grass	(Australia) Robert Howe	(United Kingdom) Angela Mortimer (Australia) Peter Newman	9–11, 6–1, 6–2

== Grand Slam performance timelines ==
Key
W	F	SF	QF	#R	RR	Q#	DNQ	A	NH

(W) winner; (F) finalist; (SF) semifinalist; (QF) quarterfinalist; (#R) rounds 4, 3, 2, 1; (RR) round-robin stage; (Q#) qualification round; (DNQ) did not qualify; (A) absent; (NH) not held; (SR) strike rate (events won / competed); (W–L) win–loss record.

=== Singles ===
Tournament	1946	1947	1948	1949	1950	1951	1952	1953	1954	1955	1956	1957	1958	1959	1960	1961	1962	1963	1964	1965	W–L
Grand Slam tournaments
Australia	2R	QF	SF	QF	QF	QF	SF	SF	SF	QF	SF	QF	QF	SF	QF	QF	3R	2R	2R	2R	38–20
France	A	A	A	A	A	A	A	A	A	A	1R	3R	3R	A	4R	A	4R	A	A	A	7–5
Wimbledon	A	A	A	A	A	A	A	A	A	A	A	2R	4R	A	2R	A	2R	A	A	A	4–4
United States	A	A	A	A	A	A	A	A	A	A	A	QF	3R	A	2R	A	1R	A	A	A	6–3

=== Doubles ===
Tournament	1946	1947	1948	1949	1950	1951	1952	1953	1954	1955	1956	1957	1958	1959	1960	1961	1962	1963	1964	1965	W–L
Grand Slam tournaments
Australia	W	F	F	SF	SF	F	F	F	W	W	W	F	W	SF	SF	F	QF	QF	QF	2R	45–15
France	A	A	A	A	A	A	A	A	A	A	2R	QF	F	A	SF	A	2R	A	A	A	7–4
Wimbledon	A	A	A	A	A	A	A	A	A	A	A	F	SF	A	SF	A	2R	A	A	A	11–4
United States	A	A	A	A	A	A	A	A	A	A	A	SF	SF	A	SF	A	A	A	A	A	7–3
