= Gwen Thiele =

Australian tennis player

- Full name: Gwen O'Halloran Thiele
- Country (sports): Australia
- Born: 23 March 1918
- Died: 16 November 1979 (aged 61)

Singles

Grand Slam singles results
- Australian Open: 3R (1937, 1938, 1939)

Doubles

Grand Slam doubles results
- Australian Open: F (1955)

Grand Slam mixed doubles results
- Australian Open: F (1952)

Gwen Thiele (née O'Halloran; 23 March 1918 – 16 November 1979) was an Australian tennis player. She competed in the Australian Open from 1937 to 1965.

She was posthumously inducted into the South Australian Legend's Club in 2019.

She married A.R. Thiele on 30 December 1944.

== Grand Slam tournament finals ==
=== Doubles (1 runner-up) ===
Result	Year	Championship	Surface	Partner	Opponents	Score
Loss	1955	Australian Championships	Grass	(Australia) Nell Hall Hopman	(Australia) Mary Bevis Hawton (Australia) Beryl Penrose	5–7, 1–6

=== Mixed doubles (1 runner-up) ===
Result	Year	Championship	Surface	Partner	Opponents	Score
Loss	1952	Australian Championships	Grass	(Australia) Tom Warhurst	(Australia) Thelma Coyne Long (Australia) George Worthington	7–9, 5–7
