= 1951 Davis Cup =

1951 edition of the Davis Cup

Details
- Duration: 3 May – 28 December 1951
- Edition: 40th
- Teams: 27

Champion
- Winning nation: Australia

The 1951 Davis Cup was the 40th edition of the most important tournament between national teams in men's tennis. 21 teams entered the Europe Zone, and 5 teams entered the America Zone. The Europe Zone began using a seeding system, where the previous year's quarterfinalists were guaranteed a bye in the first round.

The United States defeated Canada in the America Zone final, and Sweden defeated West Germany in the Europe Zone final. The USA defeated Sweden in the Inter-Zonal play-off, but fell to defending champions Australia in the Challenge Round. The final was played at White City Stadium in Sydney, Australia on 26–28 December.

== America Zone ==
=== Draw ===
Quarterfinals; 20–22 July
Louisville, KY, United States (grass)
Japan	0
United States	5
Mexico
bye
bye
Cuba
bye
Canada

Semifinals; 3–5 August
Rye, NY, United States (grass)
United States	5
Mexico	0
Montreal, Canada (grass)
Cuba	0
Canada	5

Final; 10–12 August
Montreal, Canada (grass)
United States	5
Canada	0

=== Final ===
Canada vs. United States

Canada
0
Mount Royal Tennis Club, Montreal, Canada
10–12 August 1951
Grass

United States
5

			1	2	3	4	5
1	(Canada) (United States)	Lorne Main; Tony Trabert	1; 6	2; 6	3; 6
2	(Canada) (United States)	Brendan Macken; Dick Savitt	3; 6	1; 6	3; 6
3	(Canada) (United States)	Brendan Macken / Henri Rochon; Budge Patty / Tony Trabert	4; 6	3; 6	2; 6
4	(Canada) (United States)	Henri Rochon; Art Larsen	2; 6	1; 6	3; 6
5	(Canada) (United States)	Lorne Main; Budge Patty	3; 6	3; 6	2; 6

== Europe Zone ==
=== Draw ===
First Round; 3–11 May
Sweden
bye
Austria
bye
France
bye
Great Britain
bye
Philippines
bye
Finland	1
Brazil	4
Ireland
bye
Netherlands	4
Monaco	1
Norway	2
Egypt	3
bye
Belgium
Yugoslavia	2
West Germany	3
bye
Denmark
Switzerland	5
Luxembourg	0
bye
Poland
bye
South Africa
bye
Italy

Second Round; 11–22 May
Vienna, Austria (clay)
Sweden	5
Austria	0
Wimbledon, England (grass)
France	2
Great Britain	3
Paris, France (clay)
Philippines	4
Brazil	1
Scheveningen, Netherlands (clay)
Ireland	2
Netherlands	3
Brussels, Belgium
Egypt	1
Belgium	4
West Berlin (clay)
West Germany	4
Denmark	1
Zürich, Switzerland
Switzerland	1
Poland	4
Milan, Italy (clay)
South Africa	2
Italy	3

Quarterfinals; 14–19 June
Scarborough, England (grass)
Sweden	5
Great Britain	0
Noordwijk, Netherlands (clay)
Philippines	4
Netherlands	1
Cologne, West Germany
Belgium	2
West Germany	3
Milan, Italy (clay)
Poland	0
Italy	5

Semifinals; 13–19 July
Båstad, Sweden (clay)
Sweden	5
Philippines	0
Munich, West Germany
West Germany	3
Italy	2

Final; 27–29 July
Båstad, Sweden (clay)
Sweden	5
West Germany	0

=== Final ===
Sweden vs. West Germany

Sweden
5
Bastad Tennis Stadium, Båstad, Sweden
27–29 July 1951
Clay

West Germany
0

			1	2	3	4	5
1	(Sweden) (West Germany)	Lennart Bergelin; Gottfried von Cramm	6; 4	6; 1	6; 4
2	(Sweden) (West Germany)	Sven Davidson; Ernst Buchholz	6; 2	6; 1	6; 4
3	(Sweden) (West Germany)	Lennart Bergelin / Sven Davidson; Gottfried von Cramm / Rolf Göpfert	9; 7	9; 7	8; 10	6; 2
4	(Sweden) (West Germany)	Lennart Bergelin; Ernst Buchholz	6; 1	5; 7	6; 4	6; 3
5	(Sweden) (West Germany)	Sven Davidson; Helmut Gulcz	6; 0	6; 2	6; 1

== Inter-Zonal Final ==
United States vs. Sweden

United States
5
Kooyong Stadium, Melbourne, Australia
13–15 December 1951
Grass

Sweden
0

			1	2	3	4	5
1	(United States) (Sweden)	Tony Trabert; Sven Davidson	6; 3	6; 4	9; 7
2	(United States) (Sweden)	Ted Schroeder; Lennart Bergelin	6; 2	6; 2	6; 4
3	(United States) (Sweden)	Ted Schroeder / Tony Trabert; Lennart Bergelin / Sven Davidson	10; 12	6; 0	6; 3	6; 2
4	(United States) (Sweden)	Ted Schroeder; Sven Davidson	6; 2	6; 2	6; 1
5	(United States) (Sweden)	Tony Trabert; Lennart Bergelin	6; 1	10; 8	6; 4

== Challenge Round ==
Australia vs. United States

Australia
3
White City Stadium, Sydney, Australia
26–28 December 1951
Grass

United States
2

			1	2	3	4	5
1	(Australia) (United States)	Mervyn Rose; Vic Seixas	3; 6	4; 6	7; 9
2	(Australia) (United States)	Frank Sedgman; Ted Schroeder	6; 4	6; 3	4; 6	6; 4
3	(Australia) (United States)	Ken McGregor / Frank Sedgman; Ted Schroeder / Tony Trabert	6; 2	9; 7	6; 3
4	(Australia) (United States)	Mervyn Rose; Ted Schroeder	4; 6	11; 13	5; 7
5	(Australia) (United States)	Frank Sedgman; Vic Seixas	6; 4	6; 2	6; 2
