= 1951 U.S. National Championships – Men's singles =

Men's singles
- 1951 U.S. National Championships

Final
- Champion: (Australia) Frank Sedgman
- Runner-up: (United States) Vic Seixas
- Score: 6–4, 6–1, 6–1

Events
Singles	men	women
Doubles	men	women
- U.S. National Championships

Frank Sedgman defeated Vic Seixas 6–4, 6–1, 6–1 in the final to win the men's singles tennis title at the 1951 U.S. National Championships.

== Seeds ==
The tournament used two lists of eight players for seeding the men's singles event; one for U.S. players and one for foreign players. Frank Sedgman is the champion; others show the round in which they were eliminated.

U.S.

1. (United States) Dick Savitt (semifinals)
2. (United States) Arthur Larsen (semifinals)
3. (United States) Tony Trabert (quarterfinals)
4. (United States) Herbie Flam (quarterfinals)
5. (United States) Bill Talbert (fourth round)
6. (United States) Gardnar Mulloy (quarterfinals)
7. (United States) Vic Seixas (finalist)
8. (United States) J.E. Patty (quarterfinals)

Foreign

1. (Australia) Frank Sedgman (champion)
2. (Australia) Ken McGregor (fourth round)
3. (Australia) Mervyn Rose (fourth round)
4. (United Kingdom) Tony Mottram (third round)
5. (France) Paul Rémy (second round)
6. (Australia) Don Candy (third round)
7. (Japan) Jiro Kumamaru (first round)
8. (South Africa) Sydney Levy (third round)

== Draw ==
=== Key ===
- Q = Qualifier
- WC = Wild card
- LL = Lucky loser
- r = Retired

=== Final eight ===
Quarterfinals
1	(United States) Dick Savitt	6	1	4	6	6
15	(United States) J.E. Patty	3	6	6	1	4
7	(United States) Herbie Flam	6	7	6	2	3
13	(United States) Vic Seixas	1	9	2	6	6
3	(United States) Arthur Larsen	6	6	6	6
11	(United States) Gardnar Mulloy	8	1	2	4
5	(United States) Tony Trabert	6	2	5	6	3
2	(Australia) Frank Sedgman	3	6	7	3	6

Semifinals
1	(United States) Dick Savitt	0	6	3	2
13	(United States) Vic Seixas	6	3	6	6
3	(United States) Arthur Larsen	1	2	0
2	(Australia) Frank Sedgman	6	6	6

Final
13	(United States) Vic Seixas	4	1	1
2	(Australia) Frank Sedgman	6	6	6

=== Earlier rounds ===
==== Section 1 ====
First round

Second round
1	(United States) Savitt	6	6	6
(United States) Alloo	0	2	1
(United States) Ink	4	2	6	2
(Canada) Main	6	6	3	6
(United States) Clark	8	6	7	6
(United States) Hernandez	10	3	5	1
(United States) Shields	1	3	1
16	(South Africa) Levy	6	6	6

Third round
1	(United States) Savitt	7	6	6
(Canada) Main	5	3	2
(United States) Clark	6	6	6
16	(South Africa) Levy	4	3	3

Fourth round
1	(United States) Savitt	6	6	6
(United States) Clark	3	1	3

==== Section 2 ====
First round
(United States) Grigry	6	6	6
(Peru) Olmedo	0	4	1
(United States) Sorlien	1	6	7	8
(United States) Welsh	6	4	5	6
(United States) Fox	6	4	6	6
(United States) Sisson	4	6	4	2
6	(Australia) Rose	6	6	6
(United States) Neff	2	4	1

Second round
15	(United States) Patty	6	6	6
(United States) Vincent	0	2	3
(United States) Seeler	5	3	8	5
(Czechoslovakia) Hecht	7	6	6	7
(United States) Grigry	6	6	3	6	4
(United States) Sorlien	3	3	6	8	6
(United States) Fox	1	2	3
6	(Australia) Rose	6	6	6

Third round
15	(United States) Patty	7	11	3	6
(Czechoslovakia) Hecht	5	9	6	4
(United States) Sorlien	2	2	4
6	(Australia) Rose	6	6	6

Fourth round
15	(United States) Patty	1	6	6	7
6	(Australia) Rose	6	3	2	5

==== Section 3 ====
First round
7	(United States) Flam	6	6	6
(United States) Burrows	4	0	0
(Chile) Balbiers	6	6	6
(United States) Ehmke	4	2	2
(United States) Vogt	6	6	6
(United States) Backe	4	4	2
(United States) Heldman	6	6	3	6
(United States) Long	3	3	6	1
(United States) Schwartz	6	6	6
(United States) Gaines	2	4	0
(United States) Catton	6	6	7
(United States) Masterson	0	4	5
(United States) Moylan	6	6	8
(United States) Young	2	3	6
10	(France) Rémy	3	6	6	3	6
(United States) De Witts	6	3	4	6	1

Second round
7	(United States) Flam	6	6	6
(Chile) Balbiers	0	3	2
(United States) Vogt	13	6	6
(United States) Heldman	11	4	3
(United States) Schwartz	8	4	6	1	4
(United States) Catton	6	6	3	6	6
(United States) Moylan	3	2	6	7	6
10	(France) Rémy	6	6	2	5	3

Third round
7	(United States) Flam	6	6	6
(United States) Vogt	3	4	4
(United States) Catton	1	3	2
(United States) Moylan	6	6	6

Fourth round
7	(United States) Flam	4	6	6	7
(United States) Moylan	6	2	2	5

==== Section 4 ====
First round
13	(United States) Seixas	4	6	4	6	6
(United States) Bartzen	6	0	6	0	3
(United States) Devoe	6	6	6
(United States) Johnson	2	3	4
(United States) Deodhar	0	6	6	8
(United States) Kerdasha	6	3	1	6
(United States) Fisher	6	6	6
(United States) Cleveland	1	1	4
(Peru) Morales	3	6	6	3	6
(United States) Hayes	6	3	2	6	1
(United States) Eisenberg	8	6	6
(Lebanon) Hajjar	6	2	1
(United States) Hagist	1	8	6	6
(Japan) Fujikura	6	6	4	2
4	(Australia) McGregor	6	6	6
(United States) Martin	2	2	4

Second round
13	(United States) Seixas	6	5	6	6
(United States) Devoe	3	7	2	4
(United States) Deodhar	1	0	0
(United States) Fisher	6	6	6
(Peru) Morales	6	7	7	3	1
(United States) Eisenberg	4	9	5	6	6
(United States) Hagist	6	2	2	6
4	(Australia) McGregor	3	6	6	8

Third round
13	(United States) Seixas	8	6	6
(United States) Fisher	6	4	2
(United States) Eisenberg	3	6	1
4	(Australia) McGregor	6	8	6

Fourth round
13	(United States) Seixas	4	7	7	6
4	(Australia) McGregor	6	5	5	4

==== Section 5 ====
First round
3	(United States) Larsen	6	6	6
(United States) Lewyn	1	2	1
(United States) Anthony	4	6	6	6
(United States) Reed	6	0	2	3
(United States) Golden	6	6	6
(United States) Wood	2	0	3
(Canada) Macken	6	7	6
(United States) Fine	2	5	3
(United States) Richardson	6	6	6
(United States) Reed	2	3	1
(United States) Huebner	6	9	6
(United States) Hobbs	3	7	2
(United States) Willner	4	6	6	6
(United States) Freedman	6	3	3	1
(United States) Tuero	8	6	6	11
14	(Japan) Kumamaru	6	8	4	9

Second round
3	(United States) Larsen	6	6	6
(United States) Anthony	2	0	4
(United States) Golden	6	6	6
(Canada) Macken	3	3	3
(United States) Richardson	5	7	6	3	10
(United States) Huebner	7	5	4	6	8
(United States) Willner	6	1	2	5
(United States) Tuero	4	6	6	7

Third round
3	(United States) Larsen	6	6	6
(United States) Golden	2	3	4
(United States) Richardson	2	7	6	6
(United States) Tuero	6	5	3	2

Fourth round
3	(United States) Larsen	6	3	6	3	7
(United States) Richardson	4	6	1	6	5

==== Section 6 ====
First round
11	(United States) Mulloy	6	6	8
(United States) Tully	4	1	6
(United States) Bassford	6	6	6
(United States) Slobin	2	1	4
(United States) Cain
(United States) Herren	w/o
(United States) Van Rensselaer	6	6	6
(United States) Hetzeck	1	2	3
(United States) Cochell	6	6	6
(France) Molinari	3	2	1
(Peru) Buse	7	6	6
(United States) Rogers	5	3	3
(United States) Rumbough	3	6	6	6
(United States) Bishop	6	3	4	4
8	(United Kingdom) Mottram	6	6	6	6
(United States) Steele Jr.	1	8	2	3

Second round
11	(United States) Mulloy	6	6	6
(United States) Bassford	3	2	2
(United States) Cain	w/o
(United States) Van Rensselaer
(United States) Cochell	6	6	3	6
(Peru) Buse	4	4	6	4
(United States) Rumbough	4	3	4
8	(United Kingdom) Mottram	6	6	6

Third round
11	(United States) Mulloy	6	6	6
(United States) Van Rensselaer	4	1	3
(United States) Cochell	3	6	6	8
8	(United Kingdom) Mottram	6	3	3	6

Fourth round
11	(United States) Mulloy	4	6	6	6
(United States) Cochell	6	2	1	2

==== Section 7 ====
First round
5	(United States) Trabert	6	6	6
(United States) Clothier	2	0	0
(United States) Mateer	6	7	14
(United States) Squires	4	5	12
(United States) Geller	6	6	6
(United States) Schreiber	2	2	2

Second round
5	(United States) Trabert	6	6	6
(United States) Mateer	2	2	0
(United States) Geller	9	7	5	6
(United States) Kerr	7	5	7	4
(United States) Olmedo	0	0	1
(Canada) Rochon	6	6	6
(United States) Ganzenmuller	0	2	2
12	(Australia) Candy	6	6	6

Third round
5	(United States) Trabert	6	6	7
(United States) Geller	3	4	5
(Canada) Rochon	8	8	6	4	7
12	(Australia) Candy	6	10	4	6	5

Fourth round
5	(United States) Trabert	6	6	6	6
(Canada) Rochon	3	8	1	1

==== Section 8 ====
First round

Second round
9	(United States) Talbert	6	6	6
(United States) Paton	0	0	2
(Japan) Nakano	6	0	5	6	6
(Peru) Buse	4	6	7	4	2
(United States) Ball	1	8	6	9
(United States) Boys	6	6	0	7
(United States) Bogley	0	4	2
2	(Australia) Sedgman	6	6	6

Third round
9	(United States) Talbert	6	6	6
(Japan) Nakano	2	1	1
(United States) Ball	4	0	2
2	(Australia) Sedgman	6	6	6

Fourth round
9	(United States) Talbert	1	1	5
2	(Australia) Sedgman	6	6	7

Preceded by 1951 Wimbledon Championships – Men's singles	Grand Slam men's singles	Succeeded by 1952 Australian Championships – Men's singles
