= 1952 U.S. National Championships – Men's singles =

Men's singles
- 1952 U.S. National Championships

Final
- Champion: (Australia) Frank Sedgman
- Runner-up: (United States) Gardnar Mulloy
- Score: 6–1, 6–2, 6–3

Events
Singles	men	women
Doubles	men	women
- U.S. National Championships

Frank Sedgman defeated Gardnar Mulloy 6–1, 6–2, 6–3 in the final to win the men's singles tennis title at the 1952 U.S. National Championships.

== Seeds ==
The tournament used two lists of eight players for seeding the men's singles event; one for U.S. players and one for foreign players. Frank Sedgman is the champion; others show the round in which they were eliminated.

U.S.

1. (United States) Vic Seixas (fourth round)
2. (United States) Dick Savitt (quarterfinals)
3. (United States) Arthur Larsen (fourth round)
4. (United States) Herbie Flam (fourth round)
5. (United States) Bill Talbert (fourth round)
6. (United States) Gardnar Mulloy (finalist)
7. (United States) Ham Richardson (semifinals)
8. (United States) Tut Bartzen (fourth round)

Foreign

1. (Australia) Frank Sedgman (champion)
2. (Australia) Ken McGregor (first round)
3. (Australia) Mervyn Rose (semifinals)
4. (Belgium) Philippe Washer (fourth round)
5. (Denmark) Kurt Nielsen (third round)
6. (Philippines) Felicisimo Ampon (fourth round)
7. (Australia) Ken Rosewall (quarterfinals)
8. (Australia) Lew Hoad (quarterfinals)

== Draw ==
=== Key ===
- Q = Qualifier
- WC = Wild card
- LL = Lucky loser
- r = Retired

=== Final eight ===
Quarterfinals
14	(Australia) Ken Rosewall	4	6	6	5	5
11	(United States) Gardnar Mulloy	6	3	4	7	7
(United States) Straight Clark	8	9	7	6	4
13	(United States) Ham Richardson	6	11	5	8	6
3	(United States) Dick Savitt	3	6	6
6	(Australia) Mervyn Rose	6	8	8
16	(Australia) Lew Hoad	2	1	3
2	(Australia) Frank Sedgman	6	6	6

Semifinals
11	(United States) Gardnar Mulloy	10	6	8
13	(United States) Ham Richardson	8	0	6
6	(Australia) Mervyn Rose	3	3	4
2	(Australia) Frank Sedgman	6	6	6

Final
11	(United States) Gardnar Mulloy	1	2	3
2	(Australia) Frank Sedgman	6	6	6

=== Earlier rounds ===
==== Section 1 ====
First round
1	(United States) Seixas	6	6	6
(United States) Okey	3	1	0
(United States) Wood	6	6	6
(United States) Wickel	0	2	4
(United States) Tuero	6	6	3	6
(United States) Thompson	4	3	6	4
(United States) Bishop	6	6	7	7
(Colombia) Rueda	3	2	9	5
(United States) Schwartz	6	6	6
(United States) Clothier	2	3	4
(United States) Thompson	9	6	9	6
(United States) Stern	11	3	7	2
(United States) Edis	6	11	3	6
(United States) Wilder	3	9	6	3
14	(Australia) Rosewall	6	6	6
(United States) Nettleton	2	3	3

Second round
1	(United States) Seixas	7	6	7
(United States) Wood	5	3	5
(United States) Tuero	6	7	6
(United States) Bishop	3	5	4
(United States) Schwartz	6	6	6
(United States) Thompson	2	2	0
(United States) Edis	1	2	2
14	(Australia) Rosewall	6	6	6

Third round
1	(United States) Seixas	7	7	0
(United States) Tuero	5	5	0
(United States) Schwartz	4	1	3
14	(Australia) Rosewall	6	6	6

Fourth round
1	(United States) Seixas	6	2	5	7	3
14	(Australia) Rosewall	3	6	7	5	6

==== Section 2 ====
First round
11	(United States) Mulloy	6	6	6
(Mexico) Riefkohl	0	2	1
(United States) Ditzler	6	6	9
(Jamaica) Mott-Trille	3	3	7
(United States) Eisenberg	6	6	6
(United States) Schnaars	4	3	1
(Mexico) Palafox	7	6	6
(United States) Kerdasha	5	2	4
(United States) Huebner	6	6	6
(United States) Hyde	1	1	2
(United States) Dickson	1	17	8	6	6
(United States) Self	6	19	6	4	1
(United States) Grigry	6	6	6
(United States) Young	1	4	1
8	(Belgium) Washer	6	6	6
(South Africa) Nicholson	1	0	2

Second round
11	(United States) Mulloy	6	6	6
(United States) Ditzler	1	1	1
(United States) Eisenberg	0	4	2
(Mexico) Palafox	6	6	6
(United States) Huebner	6	6	6
(United States) Dickson	3	2	2
(United States) Grigry	4	4	11	13	10
8	(Belgium) Washer	6	6	9	11	12

Third round
11	(United States) Mulloy	6	5	3	6	6
(Mexico) Palafox	2	7	6	3	4
(United States) Huebner	1	1	0
8	(Belgium) Washer	6	6	6

Fourth round
11	(United States) Mulloy	9	6	6
8	(Belgium) Washer	7	1	3

==== Section 3 ====
First round
7	(United States) Flam	6	6	6
(Ecuador) Lerque	2	3	3
(United States) Lewyn	6	6	6
(United States) Bassford	4	0	3
(United States) Longshore	2	6	6	3	6
(United States) Mathey	6	3	2	6	1
(United States) Perry	6	6	6
(Lebanon) Hajjar	4	1	4
(United States) Clark	4	6	6	6
(United States) Davis	6	1	0	0
(Canada) Rochon	2	3	6	6	6
(United States) Steele Jr.	6	6	4	0	2
(Chile) Balbiers	6	6	6
(United States) Alloo	3	2	4
10	(Denmark) Nielsen	6	6	6
(United States) Macatee	2	2	3

Second round
7	(United States) Flam	6	6	6
(United States) Lewyn	4	4	2
(United States) Longshore	3	4	2
(United States) Perry	6	6	6
(United States) Clark	6	7	6
(Canada) Rochon	1	5	4
(Chile) Balbiers	3	6	4	4
10	(Denmark) Nielsen	6	4	6	6

Third round
7	(United States) Flam	6	6	6
(United States) Perry	1	2	0
(United States) Clark	6	2	4	6	7
10	(Denmark) Nielsen	2	6	6	2	5

Fourth round
7	(United States) Flam	6	1	6	4	5
(United States) Clark	4	6	4	6	7

==== Section 4 ====
First round
13	(United States) Richardson	6	7	6
(United States) Vincent	2	5	0
(Mexico) Guerrero-Arcocha	4	6	3	6	6
(United States) Lurie	6	4	6	2	3
(United Kingdom) Barrett	7	6	3	6
(United States) Hanna	5	2	6	3
(Chile) Ayala	6	6	6
(United States) Rodriguez	0	3	1
(United States) Rogers
(United States) Rockwood	w/o
(United States) Mayne	4	6	6	9
(United States) Pierce	6	1	4	7
(United States) Masterson	6	6	6
(United States) Bostwick	0	1	4
(United States) Maccracken	3	4	6
4	(Australia) McGregor	6	6	5

Second round
13	(United States) Richardson	6	6	6
(Mexico) Guerrero-Arcocha	0	0	0
(United Kingdom) Barrett	6	7	6	5	3
(Chile) Ayala	8	5	2	7	6
(United States) Rogers	6	7	1	6	4
(United States) Mayne	4	9	6	4	6
(United States) Masterson	6	2	7	6
(United States) Maccracken	2	6	5	3

Third round
13	(United States) Richardson	6	6	6
(Chile) Ayala	0	4	3
(United States) Mayne	2	5	2
(United States) Masterson	6	7	6

Fourth round
13	(United States) Richardson	6	9	6
(United States) Masterson	1	7	2

==== Section 5 ====
First round
3	(United States) Savitt	6	6	6
(United States) Stern	2	1	3
(United States) Stucki	11	5	8	6
(United States) Weir	9	7	6	1
(United States) Giammalva	6	6	6	7
(Mexico) Ortega	8	4	2	5
(United States) Kovaleski	6	6	6
(Venezuela) Lopez	3	1	4
(United States) Hagist	6	6	10
(United States) Freedman	2	2	8
(United States) Frost	6	6	1	6
(United States) Gerhardt	4	2	6	4
(British Guiana) McDonald	6	6	2	6
(United States) Sisson	4	2	6	1
12	(Philippines) Ampon	6	7	6
(United States) Carver	2	5	0

Second round
3	(United States) Savitt	6	6	6
(United States) Stucki	0	3	0
(United States) Giammalva	1	1	4
(United States) Kovaleski	6	6	6
(United States) Hagist	9	6	6
(United States) Frost	7	4	2
(British Guiana) McDonald	3	1	1
12	(Philippines) Ampon	6	6	6

Third round
3	(United States) Savitt	7	6	6
(United States) Kovaleski	5	3	4
(United States) Hagist	3	4	4
12	(Philippines) Ampon	6	6	6

Fourth round
3	(United States) Savitt	8	6	6
12	(Philippines) Ampon	6	0	0

==== Section 6 ====
First round
15	(United States) Bartzen	6	9	6
(United States) Stewart	3	7	0
(United States) Tully	4	8
(United States) Vogt	6	6
(United States) Hobbs	6	6	7
(United Kingdom) Hirsch	1	4	5
(Belgium) Brichant	3	6	6	4	6
(United States) Sorlien	6	2	0	6	2
(United States) Potts	6	6	6
(Colombia) Cortes	0	1	1
(United States) Shea	6	6	7
(Japan) Miyagi	4	3	5
(United States) Dailey	7	6	7
(United States) McNeill	5	4	5
6	(Australia) Rose	6	6	7
(United States) Gaines	2	2	5

Second round
15	(United States) Bartzen	6	6	3	6
(United States) Tully	0	1	6	2
(United States) Hobbs	1	3	5
(Belgium) Brichant	6	6	7
(United States) Potts	5	1	6
(United States) Shea	7	6	8
(United States) Dailey	0	1	1
6	(Australia) Rose	6	6	6

Third round
15	(United States) Bartzen	4	4	6	6	6
(Belgium) Brichant	6	6	4	1	4
(United States) Shea	2	5	3
6	(Australia) Rose	6	7	6

Fourth round
15	(United States) Bartzen	0	2	1
6	(Australia) Rose	6	6	6

==== Section 7 ====
First round
5	(United States) Larsen	6	6	6
(United States) Long	2	4	4
(Czechoslovakia) Hecht	6	5	6	7
(United States) Martin	3	7	4	5
(United States) Slack	7	3	6	6
(United States) Paton	5	6	2	3
(United States) Backe	3	6	6	11
(South Africa) De Wet	6	4	3	9
(United States) Golden	6	6	6
(United States) Flye	2	2	1
(United Kingdom) Oakley	6	6	6
(United States) Fine	3	4	3
(United States) Likas	6	6	6
(United States) Shields	4	4	2
16	(Australia) Hoad	4	6	6	6
(Canada) Main	6	0	2	3

Second round
5	(United States) Larsen	6	6	8	6
(Czechoslovakia) Hecht	1	0	10	3
(United States) Slack	6	8	6
(United States) Backe	1	6	2
(United States) Golden	7	3	3	1
(United Kingdom) Oakley	5	6	6	6
(United States) Likas	6	2	8	1	4
16	(Australia) Hoad	4	6	6	6	6

Third round
5	(United States) Larsen	1	6	7	6
(United States) Slack	6	3	5	2
(United Kingdom) Oakley	2	3	4
16	(Australia) Hoad	6	6	6

Fourth round
5	(United States) Larsen	3	4	4
16	(Australia) Hoad	6	6	6

==== Section 8 ====
First round
9	(United States) Talbert	6	6	6
(United States) Eisenberg	2	4	3
(Mexico) May	6	6	6
(United States) Curtin	2	4	2
(United States) Cranston	3	6	6	6
(Mexico) Puente	6	3	3	2
(Canada) Macken	6	6	6
(Mexico) Reyes	0	3	2
(United States) Quillian	3	6	6	6
(United States) Geller	6	3	3	2
(United States) Burrows	6	6	6
(United States) Read	4	3	3
(United States) Boys	6	8	6
(United States) Fischl	3	6	2
2	(Australia) Sedgman	6	6	6
(United States) Bunis	1	0	0

Second round
9	(United States) Talbert	6	6	6
(Mexico) May	3	0	1
(United States) Cranston	4	2	6
(Canada) Macken	6	6	8
(United States) Quillian	2	3	0
(United States) Burrows	6	6	6
(United States) Boys	2	0	0
2	(Australia) Sedgman	6	6	6

Third round
9	(United States) Talbert	6	6	6
(Canada) Macken	4	2	4
(United States) Burrows	2	2	4
2	(Australia) Sedgman	6	6	6

Fourth round
9	(United States) Talbert	1	3	3
2	(Australia) Sedgman	6	6	6

Preceded by 1952 Wimbledon Championships – Men's singles	Grand Slam men's singles	Succeeded by 1953 Australian Championships – Men's singles
