= 1952 Australian Championships – Men's singles =

Men's singles
- 1952 Australian Championships

Final
- Champion: (Australia) Ken McGregor
- Runner-up: (Australia) Frank Sedgman
- Score: 7–5, 12–10, 2–6, 6–2

Details
- Draw: 37
- Seeds: 8

Events
Singles	men	women
Doubles	men	women
- Australian Championships

Fourth-seeded Ken McGregor defeated Frank Sedgman 7–5, 12–10, 2–6, 6–2 in the final to win the men's singles tennis title at the 1952 Australian Championships.

== Seeds ==
The seeded players are listed below. Ken McGregor is the champion; others show the round in which they were eliminated.

1. (Australia) Frank Sedgman (finalist)
2. (United States) Dick Savitt (semifinals)
3. (Australia) Mervyn Rose (semifinals)
4. (Australia) Ken McGregor (champion)
5. (Australia) Ian Ayre (quarterfinals)
6. (Australia) Ken Rosewall (quarterfinals)
7. (Australia) Lew Hoad (third round)
8. (Australia) Don Candy (quarterfinals)

== Draw ==
=== Key ===
- Q = Qualifier
- WC = Wild card
- LL = Lucky loser
- r = Retired

=== Finals ===
Quarterfinals
1	(Australia) Frank Sedgman	7	6	6
8	(Australia) Don Candy	5	1	4
3	(Australia) Mervyn Rose	6	6	5	2	6
6	(Australia) Ken Rosewall	4	4	7	6	2
(Australia) Geoffrey Brown	4	2	10
4	(Australia) Ken McGregor	6	6	12
5	(Australia) Ian Ayre	1	4	7	6	4
2	(United States) Dick Savitt	6	6	5	4	6

Semifinals
1	(Australia) Frank Sedgman	6	6	6
3	(Australia) Mervyn Rose	2	4	2
4	(Australia) Ken McGregor	6	6	3	6
2	(United States) Dick Savitt	4	4	6	4

Final
1	(Australia) Frank Sedgman	5	10	6	2
4	(Australia) Ken McGregor	7	12	2	6

=== Earlier rounds ===
==== Section 1 ====
First round
(Australia) Hartwig	6	6	6
(Australia) Rowe	0	1	3
(Australia) Lonergan	1	6	8	6
(Australia) Brown	6	4	6	2

Second round
1	(Australia) Sedgman	6	6	6
(Australia) Hartwig	1	2	3
(United States) Richardson	6	6	6
(Australia) Targett	1	2	4
8	(Australia) Candy	6	6	6
(Australia) Lonergan	1	2	4
(Australia) Worthington	6	6	6
(Australia) Hicks	2	3	2

Third round
1	(Australia) Sedgman	6	6	6
(United States) Richardson	4	4	0
8	(Australia) Candy	6	9	6	6
(Australia) Worthington	8	7	3	4

Quarterfinals
1	(Australia) Sedgman	7	6	6
8	(Australia) Candy	5	1	4

==== Section 2 ====
First round
(Australia) Pearse	2	12	7	6
(Australia) Cawthorn	6	10	5	4

Second round
3	(Australia) Rose	6	6	6
(Australia) O'Brien	1	0	3
(Australia) Goodger	1	0	1
(Australia) Wilderspin	6	6	6
6	(Australia) Rosewall	6	6	6
(Australia) Pearse	3	4	2
(Australia) Strohfeldt	6	6	6
(Australia) Warhurst	3	2	4

Third round
3	(Australia) Rose	6	6	4	9
(Australia) Wilderspin	2	4	6	7
6	(Australia) Rosewall	6	6	7	6
(Australia) Strohfeldt	0	2	9	4

Quarterfinals
3	(Australia) Rose	6	6	5	2	6
6	(Australia) Rosewall	4	4	7	6	2

==== Section 3 ====
First round
(Estonia) Lasn	6	6	6
(Australia) Green	4	3	2

Second round
(Australia) Clements	1	0	4
(Australia) Brown	6	6	6
(Australia) Blacklock	0	2	1
7	(Australia) Hoad	6	6	6
(Estonia) Lasn	0	7	4	0
(Australia) Yates	6	5	6	6
(Australia) Lonergan	2	1	0
4	(Australia) McGregor	6	6	6

Third round
(Australia) Brown	7	2	3	6	6
7	(Australia) Hoad	5	6	6	3	3
(Estonia) Yates	1	6	1
4	(Australia) McGregor	6	8	6

Quarterfinals
(Australia) Brown	4	2	10
4	(Australia) McGregor	6	6	12

==== Section 4 ====
First round
(Australia) Lean	6	6	6
(Australia) Sheil	4	3	2

Second round
(Australia) Bridge	3	4	4
(Australia) Quist	6	6	6
(Australia) Stewart	3	0	0
5	(Australia) Ayre	6	6	6
(Australia) Hann	4	8	7	3
(Australia) Fraser	6	6	9	6
(Australia) Lean	1	0	2
2	(United States) Savitt	6	6	6

Third round
(Australia) Quist	10	1	1	3
5	(Australia) Ayre	8	6	6	6
(Australia) Fraser	1	1	2
2	(United States) Savitt	6	6	6

Quarterfinals
5	(Australia) Ayre	1	4	7	6	4
2	(United States) Savitt	6	6	5	4	6

Preceded by 1951 U.S. National Championships	Grand Slam men's singles	Succeeded by 1952 French Championships
