= 1950 Australian Championships – Men's singles =

Men's singles
- 1950 Australian Championships

Final
- Champion: (Australia) Frank Sedgman
- Runner-up: (Australia) Ken McGregor
- Score: 6–3, 6–4, 4–6, 6–1

Details
- Draw: 35
- Seeds: 8

Events
Singles	men	women
Doubles	men	women
- Australian Championships

Fifth-seeded Frank Sedgman defeated Ken McGregor 6–3, 6–4, 4–6, 6–1 in the final to win the men's singles tennis title at the 1950 Australian Championships.

== Seeds ==
The seeded players are listed below. Frank Sedgman is the champion; others show the round in which they were eliminated.

1. (Egypt) Jaroslav Drobný (third round)
2. (South Africa) Eric Sturgess (semifinals)
3. (Australia) John Bromwich (quarterfinals)
4. (Australia) Bill Sidwell (semifinals)
5. (Australia) Frank Sedgman (champion)
6. (Australia) George Worthington (quarterfinals)
7. (Australia) Colin Long (quarterfinals)
8. (Australia) Mervyn Rose (quarterfinals)

== Draw ==
=== Key ===
- Q = Qualifier
- WC = Wild card
- LL = Lucky loser
- r = Retired

=== Finals ===
Quarterfinals
(Australia) Ken McGregor	6	8	6
6	(Australia) George Worthington	3	6	1
4	(Australia) Bill Sidwell	7	7	7
7	(Australia) Colin Long	5	5	5
5	(Australia) Frank Sedgman	5	6	6	6
3	(Australia) John Bromwich	7	3	4	1
8	(Australia) Mervyn Rose	5	4	1
2	(South Africa) Eric Sturgess	7	6	6

Semifinals
(Australia) Ken McGregor	7	9	6
4	(Australia) Bill Sidwell	5	7	3
5	(Australia) Frank Sedgman	6	6	6	4	6
2	(South Africa) Eric Sturgess	2	3	8	6	4

Final
(Australia) Ken McGregor	3	4	6	1
5	(Australia) Frank Sedgman	6	6	4	6

=== Earlier rounds ===
==== Section 1 ====
First round
(Australia) Rogers	6	4	6	10
(Australia) Sheil	3	6	1	8

Second round
1	(Egypt) Drobný	6	6	6
(Australia) Reid	3	2	2
(Australia) McGregor	6	6	6
(Australia) Ayre	3	2	1
6	(Australia) Worthington	6	6	6
(Australia) Cawthorn	3	3	3
(Australia) Hopman	6	2	6	6
(Australia) Rogers	4	6	2	3

Third round
1	(Egypt) Drobný	9	1	3
(Australia) McGregor	11	6	6
6	(Australia) Worthington	3	6	6	3	6
(Australia) Hopman	6	3	0	6	1

Quarterfinals
(Australia) McGregor	6	8	6
6	(Australia) Worthington	3	6	1

==== Section 2 ====
First round

Second round
4	(Australia) Sidwell	6	4	7	7
(Australia) Molloy	2	6	5	5
(Australia) Brodie	6	10	6
(Australia) Stewart	1	8	2
7	(Australia) Long	6	6	6
(Australia) Clements	1	4	2
(Australia) Wilderspin	6	4	6	6
(Australia) Kendall	4	6	4	3

Third round
4	(Australia) Sidwell	6	10	5	6
(Australia) Brodie	2	8	7	2
7	(Australia) Long	8	6	1	6
(Australia) Wilderspin	6	1	6	4

Quarterfinals
4	(Australia) Sidwell	7	7	7
7	(Australia) Long	5	5	5

==== Section 3 ====
First round
(Australia) Occleshaw	6	6	6
(Australia) Raward	0	1	0

Second round
(Australia) Occleshaw	1	7	3	6	6
(Australia) Crawford	6	5	6	3	4
(Australia) Hartwig	w/o
5	(Australia) Sedgman
(Australia) Brophy	6	6	6
(Australia) Skennar	4	2	3
(Australia) Yates	3	1	5
3	(Australia) Bromwich	6	6	7

Third round
(Australia) Occleshaw	0	1	0
5	(Australia) Sedgman	6	6	6
(Australia) Brophy	1	1	0
3	(Australia) Bromwich	6	6	6

Quarterfinals
5	(Australia) Sedgman	5	6	6	6
3	(Australia) Bromwich	7	3	4	1

==== Section 4 ====
First round
(Australia) Tregonning	6	7	6
(Australia) Maggs	4	5	1

Second round
(Australia) Tregonning	0	4	6	3
(Australia) Mehaffey	6	6	3	6
(Australia) Barnett	1	6	2	3
8	(Australia) Rose	6	4	6	6
(Australia) Vinson	0	0	1
(Australia) Candy	6	6	6
(Australia) Lonergan	3	0	1
2	(South Africa) Sturgess	6	6	6

Third round
(Australia) Mehaffey	2	3	6
8	(Australia) Rose	6	6	8
(Australia) Candy	1	1	6	3
2	(South Africa) Sturgess	6	6	4	6

Quarterfinals
8	(Australia) Rose	5	4	1
2	(South Africa) Sturgess	7	6	6

Preceded by 1949 U.S. National Championships	Grand Slam men's singles	Succeeded by 1950 French Championships
