= 1949 Australian Championships – Men's singles =

Men's singles
- 1949 Australian Championships

Final
- Champion: (Australia) Frank Sedgman
- Runner-up: (Australia) John Bromwich
- Score: 6–3, 6–2, 6–2

Details
- Draw: 40
- Seeds: 8

Events
| Singles | men | women |
| Doubles | men | women |
- Australian Championships

Fourth-seeded Frank Sedgman defeated John Bromwich 6–3, 6–2, 6–2 in the final to win the men's singles tennis title at the 1949 Australian Championships.

== Seeds ==
The seeded players are listed below. Frank Sedgman is the champion; others show the round in which they were eliminated.

1. (Australia) John Bromwich (finalist)
2. (Australia) Bill Sidwell (semifinals)
3. (Australia) Geoffrey Brown (semifinals)
4. (Australia) Frank Sedgman (champion)
5. (Australia) Adrian Quist (quarterfinals)
6. (Australia) Colin Long (quarterfinals)
7. (Australia) George Worthington (quarterfinals)
8. (Australia) Jack Crawford (third round)

== Draw ==
=== Key ===
- Q = Qualifier
- WC = Wild card
- LL = Lucky loser
- r = Retired

=== Finals ===
Quarterfinals
1 | (Australia) John Bromwich | 6 | 6 | 1 | 6
6 | (Australia) Colin Long | 4 | 4 | 6 | 2
3 | (Australia) Geoffrey Brown | 6 | 6 | 4 | 6
7 | (Australia) George Worthington | 1 | 3 | 6 | 1
5 | (Australia) Adrian Quist | 2 | 6 | 4 | 4
4 | (Australia) Frank Sedgman | 6 | 4 | 6 | 6
(Australia) Tom Warhurst | 3 | 1 | 6 | 4
2 | (Australia) Bill Sidwell | 6 | 6 | 4 | 6

Semifinals
1 | (Australia) John Bromwich | 1 | 6 | 6 | 6
3 | (Australia) Geoffrey Brown | 6 | 3 | 3 | 3
4 | (Australia) Frank Sedgman | 6 | 6 | 6
2 | (Australia) Bill Sidwell | 3 | 3 | 2

Final
1 | (Australia) John Bromwich | 3 | 2 | 2
4 | (Australia) Frank Sedgman | 6 | 6 | 6

=== Earlier rounds ===
==== Section 1 ====
First round
(Australia) Schwartz | 6 | 9 | 6
(Australia) Occleshaw | 0 | 7 | 2
(Australia) Rowe | 2 | 1 | 6 | 6 | 6
(Australia) Sheil | 6 | 6 | 2 | 3 | 4

Second round
1 | (Australia) Bromwich | 6 | 6 | 6
(Australia) Schwartz | 0 | 0 | 0
(Australia) Hopman | 6 | 1 | 6 | 6
(Australia) Clements | 0 | 6 | 2 | 3
6 | (Australia) Long | 5 | 6 | 6 | 6
(Australia) Rowe | 7 | 1 | 2 | 1
(Australia) Newcombe | 6 | 5 | 6 | 7
(Australia) Brophy | 4 | 7 | 1 | 5

Third round
1 | (Australia) Bromwich | 6 | 6 | 6
(Australia) Hopman | 3 | 1 | 4
6 | (Australia) Long | 6 | 6 | 6
(Australia) Newcombe | 0 | 0 | 2

Quarterfinals
1 | (Australia) Bromwich | 6 | 6 | 1 | 6
6 | (Australia) Long | 4 | 4 | 6 | 2

==== Section 2 ====
First round
(Australia) Skennar | 6 | 6 | 6
(Australia) Way | 3 | 2 | 2
(Australia) Hann | 6 | 3 | 6 | 6
(Australia) Snellgrove | 0 | 6 | 3 | 3

Second round
3 | (Australia) Brown | 6 | 6 | 7
(Australia) Skennar | 3 | 3 | 5
(Australia) Stewart | 7 | 3 | 4
(Australia) McGregor | 9 | 6 | 6
7 | (Australia) Worthington | 6 | 6 | 6
(Australia) Hann | 1 | 4 | 4
(New Zealand) Campbell | 0 | 1 | 1
(Australia) Rose | 6 | 6 | 6

Third round
3 | (Australia) Brown | 6 | 6 | 6
(Australia) McGregor | 1 | 2 | 2
7 | (Australia) Worthington | 6 | 6 | 4 | 6 | 6
(Australia) Rose | 4 | 3 | 6 | 8 | 2

Quarterfinals
3 | (Australia) Brown | 6 | 6 | 4 | 6
7 | (Australia) Worthington | 1 | 3 | 6 | 1

==== Section 3 ====
First round
(Australia) Howe | 4 | 6 | 6 | 9
(Australia) Mehaffey | 6 | 4 | 4 | 7
(Australia) Ayre | 4 | 7 | 6 | 6
(Australia) Lean | 6 | 5 | 3 | 4

Second round
(Australia) Lonergan | 3 | 0 | 1
(Australia) Wilderspin | 6 | 6 | 6
(Australia) Howe | 3 | 2 | 1
5 | (Australia) Quist | 6 | 6 | 6
(Australia) Candy | 1 | 6 | 6 | 6
(Australia) Liddle | 6 | 2 | 3 | 1
(Australia) Ayre | 0 | 3 | 7
4 | (Australia) Sedgman | 6 | 6 | 9

Third round
(Australia) Wilderspin | 5 | 4 | 0
5 | (Australia) Quist | 7 | 6 | 6
(Australia) Candy | 2 | 4 | 1
4 | (Australia) Sedgman | 6 | 6 | 6

Quarterfinals
5 | (Australia) Quist | 2 | 6 | 4 | 4
4 | (Australia) Sedgman | 6 | 4 | 6 | 6

==== Section 4 ====
First round
(Australia) Lock | 4 | 6 | 6 | 3 | 6
(Australia) Hawton | 6 | 1 | 4 | 6 | 0
(Australia) Tregonning | 6 | 3 | 0 | 6 | 6
(Australia) Goodger | 3 | 6 | 6 | 2 | 3

Second round
(Australia) Warhurst | 7 | 4 | 6 | 6
(Australia) Molloy | 5 | 6 | 3 | 3
(Australia) Lock | 1 | 7 | 1 | 3
8 | (Australia) Crawford | 6 | 5 | 6 | 6
(Australia) Cock | 0 | 3 | 0
(Australia) Bonner | 6 | 6 | 6
(Australia) Tregonning | 2 | 1 | 1
2 | (Australia) Sidwell | 6 | 6 | 6

Third round
(Australia) Warhurst | 8 | 5 | 5 | 12 | 6
8 | (Australia) Crawford | 6 | 7 | 7 | 10 | 3
(Australia) Bonner | 2 | 6 | 1 | 3
2 | (Australia) Sidwell | 6 | 4 | 6 | 6

Quarterfinals
(Australia) Warhurst | 3 | 1 | 6 | 4
2 | (Australia) Sidwell | 6 | 6 | 4 | 6

| Preceded by 1948 U.S. National Championships | Grand Slam men's singles | Succeeded by 1949 French Championships |
