= 1952 Davis Cup =

1952 edition of the Davis Cup

Details
- Duration: 1 May – 31 December 1952
- Edition: 41st
- Teams: 29

Champion
- Winning nation: Australia

The 1952 Davis Cup was the 41st edition of the most important tournament between national teams in men's tennis. 23 teams entered in the Europe Zone, 5 teams entered in the America Zone, and India was the sole competitor in the new Eastern Zone.

The United States defeated Canada in the America Zone final, and Italy defeated Belgium in the Europe Zone final. In the Inter-Zonal Zone, Italy defeated India in the semifinal, and then lost to the United States in the final. In the Challenge Round the United States fell to the defending champions Australia. The final was played at the Memorial Drive Park in Adelaide, Australia on 29–31 December.

== America Zone ==
=== Draw ===
Quarterfinals; 25–27 July
Cincinnati, OH, United States (grass)
Japan	0
United States	5
Cuba
bye
bye
Mexico
bye
Canada

Semifinals; 1–3 August
Havana, Cuba
United States	5
Cuba	0
Montreal, Canada (grass)
Mexico	0
Canada	5

Final; 8–10 August
Montreal, Canada (grass)
United States	4
Canada	1

=== Final ===
Canada vs. United States

Canada
1
Mount Royal Tennis Club, Montreal, Canada
8–10 August 1952
Grass

United States
4

			1	2	3	4	5
1	(Canada) (United States)	Henri Rochon; Herbie Flam	2; 6	6; 8	2; 6
2	(Canada) (United States)	Lorne Main; Vic Seixas	2; 6	3; 6	4; 6
3	(Canada) (United States)	Brendan Macken / Lorne Main; Herbie Flam / Vic Seixas	3; 6	6; 3	3; 6	4; 6
4	(Canada) (United States)	Lorne Main; Herbie Flam	2; 6	2; 6	3; 6
5	(Canada) (United States)	Brendan Macken; Bob Perry	6; 3	11; 13	6; 4	6; 4

== Europe Zone ==
=== Draw ===
First Round; 1–11 May
West Germany
bye
Brazil
bye
Denmark
bye
Monaco	4
Ireland	1
Italy
bye
Luxembourg	0
Egypt	5
Great Britain
bye
Yugoslavia	3
Finland	2
Norway	0
France	5
bye
Netherlands
Turkey	1
Switzerland	4
bye
Argentina
Austria	1
Chile	4
bye
Sweden
Israel
Hungary	w/o
bye
Belgium

Second Round; 16–19 May
Düsseldorf, West Germany
West Germany	3
Brazil	2
Monte Carlo, Monaco (clay)
Denmark	5
Monaco	0
Rome, Italy (clay)
Italy	5
Egypt	0
Belgrade, Yugoslavia (clay)
Great Britain	3
Yugoslavia	2
Paris, France (clay)
France	4
Netherlands	1
Lausanne, Switzerland
Switzerland	0
Argentina	5
Solna, Sweden (clay)
Chile	0
Sweden	5
Brussels, Belgium
Hungary	1
Belgium	4

Quarterfinals; 13–16 June
Copenhagen, Denmark (clay)
West Germany	1
Denmark	4
Bologna, Italy (clay)
Italy	4
Great Britain	1
Paris, France (clay)
France	3
Argentina	2
Brussels, Belgium (clay)
Sweden	2
Belgium	3

Semifinals; 11–14 July
Milan, Italy (clay)
Denmark	1
Italy	4
Paris, France (clay)
France	2
Belgium	3

Final; 25–28 July
Milan, Italy (clay)
Italy	3
Belgium	1

=== Final ===
Italy vs. Belgium

Italy
3
Milan, Italy
25–28 July 1952
Clay

Belgium
1

			1	2	3	4	5
1	(Italy) (Belgium)	Rolando del Bello; Jacques Brichant	7; 5	1; 6	5; 7	6; 0	4; 6
2	(Italy) (Belgium)	Fausto Gardini; Philippe Washer	8; 6	6; 1	3; 6	2; 6	6; 4
3	(Italy) (Belgium)	Marcello del Bello / Giovanni Cucelli; Jacques Brichant / Philippe Washer	6; 3	6; 1	5; 7	3; 6	6; 3
4	(Italy) (Belgium)	Fausto Gardini; Jacques Brichant	4; 6	6; 1	0; 6	6; 2	6; 2
5	(Italy) (Belgium)	Rolando del Bello; Philippe Washer	3; 3					not completed

== Inter-Zonal Zone ==
=== Draw ===
Semifinals; 11–13 December
Brisbane, Australia (grass)
EUR	Italy	3
EAS	India	2
bye
AME	United States

Final; 18–20 December
Sydney, Australia (grass)
EUR	Italy	0
AME	United States	5

=== Semifinals ===
Italy vs. India

Italy
3
Milton Courts, Brisbane, Australia
11–13 December 1952
Grass

India
2

			1	2	3	4	5
1	(Italy) (India)	Fausto Gardini; Naresh Kumar	6; 1	5; 7	7; 5	6; 2
2	(Italy) (India)	Rolando del Bello; Sumant Misra	5; 7	4; 6	1; 6
3	(Italy) (India)	Marcello del Bello / Giovanni Cucelli; Naresh Kumar / Sumant Misra	1; 6	1; 6	6; 2	6; 2	13; 11
4	(Italy) (India)	Fausto Gardini; Sumant Misra	8; 6	8; 6	1; 6	6; 4
5	(Italy) (India)	Rolando del Bello; Naresh Kumar	2; 6	6; 8	6; 4	3; 6

=== Final ===
United States vs. Italy

United States
5
White City Stadium, Sydney, Australia
18–20 December 1952
Grass

Italy
0

			1	2	3	4	5
1	(United States) (Italy)	Vic Seixas; Fausto Gardini	5; 7	3; 6	6; 3	8; 6	6; 3
2	(United States) (Italy)	Tony Trabert; Giovanni Cucelli	6; 3	6; 1	6; 3
3	(United States) (Italy)	Vic Seixas / Tony Trabert; Marcello del Bello / Giovanni Cucelli	6; 4	6; 3	6; 2
4	(United States) (Italy)	Ham Richardson; Rolando del Bello	7; 5	6; 3	5; 7	6; 3
5	(United States) (Italy)	Tony Trabert; Fausto Gardini	6; 3	5; 7	7; 5	6; 3

== Challenge Round ==
Australia vs. United States

Australia
4
Memorial Drive Park, Adelaide, Australia
29–31 December 1952
Grass

United States
1

			1	2	3	4	5
1	(Australia) (United States)	Frank Sedgman; Vic Seixas	6; 3	6; 4	6; 3
2	(Australia) (United States)	Ken McGregor; Tony Trabert	11; 9	6; 4	6; 1
3	(Australia) (United States)	Ken McGregor / Frank Sedgman; Vic Seixas / Tony Trabert	6; 3	6; 4	1; 6	6; 3
4	(Australia) (United States)	Frank Sedgman; Tony Trabert	7; 5	6; 4	10; 8
5	(Australia) (United States)	Ken McGregor; Vic Seixas	3; 6	6; 8	8; 6	3; 6
