= 1951 U.S. National Championships (tennis) =

- Date: 25 August – 5 September
- Edition: 71st
- Category: Grand Slam (ILTF)
- Surface: Grass / Outdoor
- Location: Chestnut Hill, Massachusetts; Forest Hills, Queens, New York City; United States
- Venue: Longwood Cricket Club; West Side Tennis Club

Champions

Men's singles
- (Australia) Frank Sedgman

Women's singles
- (United States) Maureen Connolly

Men's doubles
- (Australia) Ken McGregor / (Australia) Frank Sedgman

Women's doubles
- (United States) Shirley Fry / (United States) Doris Hart

Mixed doubles
- (United States) Doris Hart / (Australia) Frank Sedgman
- U.S. National Championships

The 1951 U.S. National Championships (now known as the US Open) was a tennis tournament that took place on the outdoor grass courts at the West Side Tennis Club, Forest Hills in New York City, New York. The tournament ran from 25 August until 5 September. It was the 71st staging of the U.S. National Championships, and the fourth Grand Slam tennis event of the year.

== Finals ==
=== Men's singles ===
(Australia) Frank Sedgman defeated (United States) Vic Seixas 6–4, 6–1, 6–1

=== Women's singles ===
(United States) Maureen Connolly defeated (United States) Shirley Fry 6–3, 1–6, 6–4

=== Men's doubles ===
(Australia) Ken McGregor / (Australia) Frank Sedgman defeated (Australia) Don Candy / (Australia) Mervyn Rose 10–8, 6–4, 4–6, 7–5

=== Women's doubles ===
(United States) Shirley Fry / (United States) Doris Hart defeated (United States) Nancy Chaffee / (United States) Patricia Todd 6–4, 6–2

=== Mixed doubles ===
(United States) Doris Hart / (Australia) Frank Sedgman defeated (United States) Shirley Fry / (Australia) Mervyn Rose 6–3, 6–2

Preceded by 1951 Wimbledon Championships	Grand Slams	Succeeded by 1952 Australian Championships
