= Ken McGregor =

Australian tennis player (1929–2007)

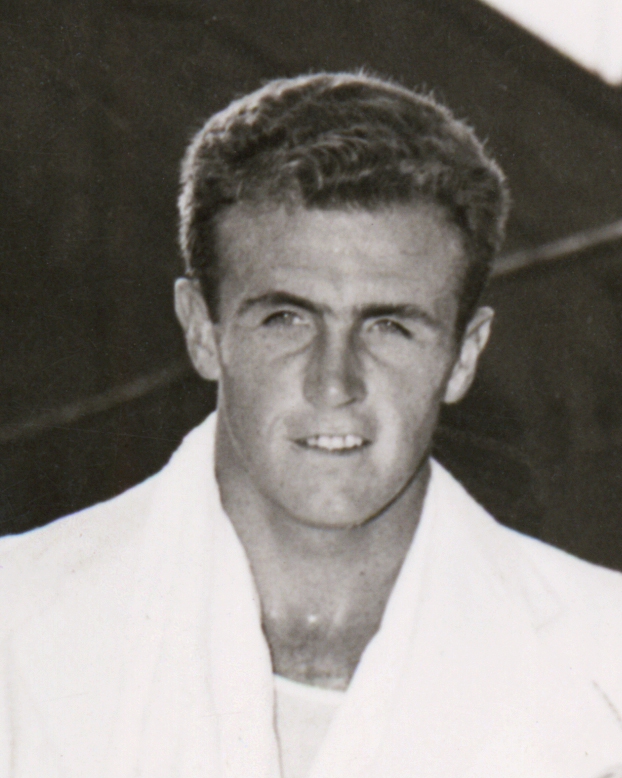
- McGregor in 1950
- Full name: Kenneth Bruce McGregor
- Country (sports): Australia
- Born: 2 June 1929 Adelaide, Australia
- Died: 1 December 2007 (aged 78) Adelaide, Australia
- Height: 188 cm (6 ft 2 in)
- Turned pro: 1952 (amateur tour from 1948)
- Retired: 1957
- Plays: Right-handed (one-handed backhand)
- Int. Tennis HoF: 1999 (member page)

Singles
- Career record: 152-62
- Career titles: 10
- Highest ranking: No. 3 (1952, Lance Tingay)

Grand Slam singles results
- Australian Open: W (1952)
- French Open: SF (1951, 1952)
- Wimbledon: F (1951)
- US Open: 4R (1951)

Doubles
- Highest ranking: No. 1 (1951)

Grand Slam doubles results
- Australian Open: W (1951, 1952)
- French Open: W (1951, 1952)
- Wimbledon: W (1951, 1952)
- US Open: W (1951)

Grand Slam mixed doubles results
- US Open: W (1950)

Team competitions
- Davis Cup: W (1950, 1951, 1952)

Kenneth Bruce McGregor (2 June 1929 – 1 December 2007) was an Australian tennis player from Adelaide who won the Men's Singles title at the Australian Championships in 1952. He and his longtime doubles partner, Frank Sedgman, are generally considered one of the greatest men's doubles teams of all time and won the doubles Grand Slam in 1951. McGregor was also a member of three Australian Davis Cup winning teams in 1950–1952. In 1953, Jack Kramer induced both Sedgman and McGregor to turn professional. He was ranked as high as World No. 3 in 1952.

== Career ==
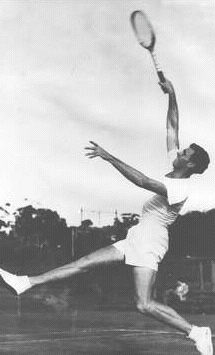
McGregor hitting a smash in the early 1950s

In 1951 and 1952 McGregor and Frank Sedgman won seven consecutive Grand Slam doubles titles – a feat that is unmatched to this day.

McGregor was also a good singles player. At the Australian Championships in 1950, McGregor beat top seed Jaroslav Drobný in an early round before losing the final against Sedgman. At the 1951 Australian Championships, McGregor beat Adrian Quist and Arthur Larsen before losing the final to Dick Savitt. Savitt also beat him in the Wimbledon final.

McGregor won the 1952 Australian Championships, beating Savitt and Sedgman in the last two rounds. He won the Belgian Championships defeating Budge Patty in the semifinal and Tony Trabert in a close five set final. McGregor also won the 1952 Eastern Grass Court Championships defeating in succession Straight Clark, Savitt, and Sedgman in the final.

In early January 1953 McGregor and Sedgman signed a contract to join Jack Kramer's professional tour. This made them ineligible to compete in the amateur Grand Slam tournaments and Davis Cup.

In his 1952–1953 tour against Pancho Segura, McGregor was beaten by 71 matches to 25. In a subsequent 1953–1954 tour against Pancho Gonzales, he was beaten 15 matches to 0.

In January 1959, McGregor won a personal series of matches against Mal Anderson at Cairns, Queensland by a score of three to zero.

=== Assessment ===
McGregor was a fine all-round athlete, excelling in cricket, Australian rules football, and tennis. He also played lacrosse. At 6 ft 2 in (1.88 m), he had a powerful serve and overhead. The great tennis player Ellsworth Vines said of McGregor: "He was the same height as Pancho Gonzales, faster, moved as well and could jump higher, and once he got to the net he was difficult to pass because of his prehensile reach. The handsome Aussie had the most extraordinary overhead of all time." In his 1979 autobiography Jack Kramer, the long-time tennis promoter and great player himself who brought McGregor into professional tennis, wrote that "McGregor was one of the weakest players but one of the nicest guys who ever played for me in the pros. As nearly as I could tell, all he wanted to do was save up some money, go back Down Under and play Australian-rules football, which in fact, he played better than he did tennis. And that's what he did."

After his retirement from tennis at the age of 25 he returned to Australian rules football and played five seasons for West Adelaide in the SANFL.

=== Honours ===
In 1999, McGregor was inducted into the International Tennis Hall of Fame in Newport, Rhode Island followed in 2000 by induction into the Australian Tennis Hall of Fame. The Ken McGregor Foundation was established by Tennis SA, the governing body of tennis in South Australia, with the aim of assisting the next generation of international tennis players.

== Grand Slam finals ==
=== Singles (1 title, 3 runners-up) ===
Result	Year	Championship	Surface	Opponent	Score
Loss	1950	Australian Championships	Grass	(Australia) Frank Sedgman	3–6, 4–6, 6–4, 1–6
Loss	1951	Australian Championships	Grass	(United States) Dick Savitt	3–6, 6–2, 3–6, 1–6
Loss	1951	Wimbledon Championships	Gras	(United States) Dick Savitt	4–6, 4–6, 4–6
Win	1952	Australian Championships	Grass	(Australia) Frank Sedgman	7–5, 12–10, 2–6, 6–2

=== Doubles (7 titles, 1 runner-up) ===
Result	Year	Championship	Surface	Partner	Opponents	Score
Win	1951	Australian Championships	Grass	(Australia) Frank Sedgman	(Australia) John Bromwich (Australia) Adrian Quist	11–9, 2–6, 6–3, 4–6, 6–3
Win	1951	French Championships	Clay	(Australia) Frank Sedgman	(United States) Gardnar Mulloy (United States) Dick Savitt	6–2, 2–6, 9–7, 7–5
Win	1951	Wimbledon	Grass	(Australia) Frank Sedgman	(Egypt) Jaroslav Drobný (South Africa) Eric Sturgess	3–6, 6–2, 6–3, 3–6, 6–3
Win	1951	U.S. Championships	Grass	(Australia) Frank Sedgman	(Australia) Don Candy (Australia) Mervyn Rose	10–8, 6–4, 4–6, 7–5
Win	1952	Australian Championships	Grass	(Australia) Frank Sedgman	(Australia) Don Candy (Australia) Mervyn Rose	6–4, 7–5, 6–3
Win	1952	French Championships	Clay	(Australia) Frank Sedgman	(United States) Gardnar Mulloy (United States) Dick Savitt	6–3, 6–4, 6–4
Win	1952	Wimbledon	Grass	(Australia) Frank Sedgman	(United States) Vic Seixas (South Africa) Eric Sturgess	6–3, 7–5, 6–4
Loss	1952	U.S. Championships	Grass	(Australia) Frank Sedgman	(Australia) Mervyn Rose (United States) Vic Seixas	6–3, 8–10, 8–10, 8–6, 6–8

=== Mixed doubles (1 title) ===
Result	Year	Championship	Surface	Partner	Opponents	Score
Win	1950	U.S. Championships	Grass	(United States) Margaret Osborne duPont	(United States) Doris Hart (Australia) Frank Sedgman	6–4, 3–6, 6–3

== Grand Slam tournament performance timeline ==
Key
W	F	SF	QF	#R	RR	Q#	DNQ	A	NH

(W) winner; (F) finalist; (SF) semifinalist; (QF) quarterfinalist; (#R) rounds 4, 3, 2, 1; (RR) round-robin stage; (Q#) qualification round; (DNQ) did not qualify; (A) absent; (NH) not held; (SR) strike rate (events won / competed); (W–L) win–loss record.

=== Singles ===
Tournament	1948	1949	1950	1951	1952	SR
Australian Championships	2R	3R	F	F	W	1 / 5
French Championships	A	A	4R	SF	SF	0 / 3
Wimbledon	A	A	4R	F	QF	0 / 3
U.S. National Championships	A	A	1R	4R	1R	0 / 3
Strike rate	0 / 1	0 / 1	0 / 4	0 / 4	1 / 4	1 / 14

== Personal life ==
McGregor was the son of Bruce and Winnifred McGregor. Bruce was the winner of the 1926 and 1927 SANFL Magarey Medals and was the West Adelaide Football Club's premiership captain-coach in 1927 as well as the Glenelg Football Club's inaugural premiership coach in 1934. Ken had one sister (Betty) who was born in 1927, the day their father Bruce was awarded his second Magarey Medal.

In 1953 he married Winifred Caro. McGregor had a history of heart problems, but was diagnosed with stomach cancer ten days prior to his death on 1 December 2007. He was survived by his wife, two children, and five grandchildren.
