= Tournament of Champions (tennis) =

Defunct tennis tournament
- Founded: 1957
- Abolished: 1959
- Location: Forest Hills, New York (1957–1959); Sydney (1957, 1959); Melbourne (1958)
- Venue: West Side Tennis Club (1957–1959); White City Stadium (1957, 1959); Kooyong Stadium (1958)
- Surface: Grass

The Tournament of Champions was a prominent professional tennis tournament series held at the West Side Tennis Club in Forest Hills, N.Y. and at Kooyong Stadium, Melbourne and White City Stadium, Sydney in Australia in 1957, 1958, and 1959.

== History ==
The tournaments were held on the grass courts of Forest Hills, New York, at West Side Tennis Club between 1957 and 1959, and Australian versions were held on grass courts at White City Stadium, Sydney 1957, at Kooyong Stadium in Melbourne in 1958, and at White City again in 1959. The 1957 and 1958 Forest Hills tournaments were both a round robin format, while the 1959 Forest Hills tournament was an elimination format with 10 players. The 1958 Kooyong Tournament of Champions was a round robin format, while the 1957 and 1959 White City, Sydney tournaments were an elimination format.

The 1958 Kooyoong Tournament of Champions, with 10,000 AUS£ prize money, was the richest tournament of the series.

The 1957 Forest Hills Tournament of Champions was broadcast live nationally in the U.S. on the CBS television network with complete broadcast coverage, the only professional tournament in the U.S. known to achieve this status prior to the Open Era. (The 1965 CBS Dallas pro tennis tournament was filmed and broadcast one match at a time as a weekly series.) The Forest Hills Tournament of Champions in 1957, 1958, and 1959 all featured a Pancho Gonzales vs. Lew Hoad singles match on the final day. The 1959 Forest Hills Tournament of Champions offered the largest winners' cheques of the year. The current designation by the West Side Tennis Club of the 1957-59 Forest Hills TOC is "WCT Tournament of Champions". Kramer's contemporary brochures described the Ampol series, of which the 1959 Forest Hills TOC was a part, with the term "World Championship Tennis".

== Sponsors ==
The Australian Tournament of Champions (TOC) was sponsored by Ampol Petroleum as the Ampol Tournament of Champions. The prize money for the 1957 Sydney TOC was 7,500 AUS£, for the 1958 Kooyong TOC it was 10,000 AUS£, and for the 1959 Sydney TOC it was 5,000 AUS£.

== Singles ==
=== Forest Hills Tournament of Champions ===
Year	Champions	Runners-up	Score
1957	(United States) Pancho Gonzales	(Australia) Frank Sedgman	Round Robin
1958	(United States) Pancho Gonzales	(Australia) Ken Rosewall	Round Robin
1959	(Australia) Lew Hoad	(United States) Pancho Gonzales	6–1, 5–7, 6–2, 6–1

=== Australian Tournament of Champions ===
Year	Location	Champions	Runners-up	Score
1957	White City Stadium, Sydney	(Ecuador) Pancho Segura	(Australia) Frank Sedgman	7–5, 6–0, 6–4
1958	Kooyong Stadium, Melbourne	(Australia) Lew Hoad	(Australia) Frank Sedgman	Round Robin
1959	White City Stadium, Sydney	(United States) Pancho Gonzales	(Australia) Lew Hoad	11–9, 6–1, 6–1

== Draws ==
=== Forest Hills 1957 ===
	(United States) Gonzales	(Australia) Sedgman	(Australia) Hoad	(Australia) Rosewall	(United States) Trabert	(Ecuador) Segura	RR; W–L	Set; W–L	Game; W–L	Standings
(United States) Pancho Gonzales		5–7, 7–5, 3–6, 6–3, 6–3	9–7, 6–4, 3–6, 6–3	6–2, 8–6, 6–4	6–3, 3–6, 11–9, 6–3	6–4, 6–3, 6–4	5–0	15–4	115–88	1
(Australia) Frank Sedgman	7–5, 5–7, 6–3, 3–6, 3–6		3–6, 4–6, 4–6	4–6, 7–5, 6–2, 6–2	2–6, 6–4, 8–6, 6–3	7–5, 4–6, 6–0, 6–1	3–2	11–9	103–91	2
(Australia) Lew Hoad	7–9, 4–6, 6–3, 3–6	6–3, 6–4, 6–4		3–6, 7–9, 6–4, 3–6	4–6, 12–10, 2–6, 6–3, 3–6	6–1, 7–5, 6–2	2–3	10–9	103–99	3
(Australia) Ken Rosewall	2–6, 6–8, 4–6	6–4, 5–7, 2–6, 2–6	6–3, 9–7, 4–6, 6–3		4–6, 12–14, 4–6	6–3, 6–1, 6–8, 2–6, 13–11	2–3	7–12	105–117	3
(United States) Tony Trabert	3–6, 6–3, 9–11, 3–6	6–2, 4–6, 6–8, 3–6	6–4, 10–12, 6–2, 3–6, 6–3	6–4, 12–10, 6–4		4–6, 5–7, 11–9, 6–4, 5–7	2–3	10–11	124–126	3
(Ecuador) Pancho Segura	4–6, 3–6, 4–6	5–7, 6–4, 0–6, 1–6	1–6, 5–7, 2–6	3–6, 1–6, 8–6, 6–2, 11–13	6–4, 7–5, 9–11, 4–6, 7–5		1–4	6–14	87–	6

=== Forest Hills 1958 ===
	(United States) Gonzales	(Australia) Rosewall	(United States) Trabert	(Australia) Hoad	(Ecuador) Segura	(Australia) Sedgman	(Australia) Hartwig	RR; W–L	Set; W–L	Game; W–L	Standings
(United States) Pancho Gonzales		19–17, 5–7, 6–4	6–4, 6–8, 8–6	15–13, 3–6, 4–6	13–11, 6–2	10–8, 6–2	6–3, 6–3	5–1	11–4	119–100	1
(Australia) Ken Rosewall	17–19, 7–5, 4–6		6–2, 6–2	6–2, 9–7	4–6, 6–1, 6–1	6–4, 2–6, 6–3	6–3, 6–3	5–1	11–4	97–70	2
(United States) Tony Trabert	4–6, 8–6, 6–8	2–6, 2–6		2–6, 6–3, 6–2	2–6, 6–4, 6–4	8–6, 8–6	6–2, 8–6	4–2	9–6	80–77	3
(Australia) Lew Hoad	13–15, 6–3, 6–4	2–6, 7–9	6–2, 3–6, 2–6		6–2, 9–7	6–4, 3–6, 6–4	3–6, 6–1, 6–3	4–2	9–7	90–84	4
(Ecuador) Pancho Segura	11–13, 2–6	6–4, 1–6, 1–6	6–2, 4–6, 4–6	2–6, 7–9		6–1, 6–4	8–6, 13–11	2–4	6–8	77–86	5
(Australia) Frank Sedgman	8–10, 2–6	4–6, 6–2, 3–6	6–8, 6–8	4–6, 6–3, 4–6	1–6, 4–6		9–7, 6–2	1–5	4–10	69–82	6
(Australia) Rex Hartwig	3–6, 3–6	3–6, 3–6	2–6, 6–8	6–3, 1–6, 3–6	6–8, 11–13	7–9, 2–6		0–6	1–12	56–89	7

=== Forest Hills 1959 ===
First round
(Australia) Mervyn Rose	2	4
(Australia) Mal Anderson	6	6
(Australia) Ashley Cooper	6	6
(United States) Sam Giammalva	1	3

Quarterfinals
(Australia) Lew Hoad	6	6	6
(Australia) Mal Anderson	8	3	4
(Ecuador) Pancho Segura	1	5
(Australia) Ken Rosewall	6	7
(United States) Tony Trabert	6	28	6
(Australia) Frank Sedgman	8	26	2
(Australia) Ashley Cooper	3	2
(United States) Pancho Gonzales	6	6

Semifinals
(Australia) Lew Hoad	5	6	7	6
(Australia) Ken Rosewall	7	4	5	4
(United States) Tony Trabert	2	1	8	8
(United States) Pancho Gonzales	6	6	6	10

Final
(Australia) Lew Hoad	6	5	6	6
(United States) Pancho Gonzales	1	7	2	1

== See also ==
- Major professional tennis tournaments before the Open Era
