= 1947 Davis Cup =

1947 edition of the Davis Cup

Details
- Duration: 2 May – 1 September 1947
- Edition: 36th
- Teams: 22

Champion
- Winning nation: United States

The 1947 Davis Cup was the 36th edition of the most important tournament between national teams in men's tennis. 20 teams entered the Europe Zone, and 2 teams entered the America Zone. Luxembourg competed for the first time.

Australia defeated Canada in the America Zone final, and Czechoslovakia defeated Yugoslavia in the Europe Zone final. Australia defeated Czechoslovakia in the Inter-Zonal play-off, but was defeated by defending champions the United States in the Challenge Round. The final was played at the West Side Tennis Club in Forest Hills, New York, United States on 30 August-1 September.

== America Zone ==
=== Final ===
Canada vs. Australia

Canada
0
Mount Royal Tennis Club, Montreal, Canada
8–10 August 1947
Grass

Australia
5

			1	2	3	4	5
1	(Canada) (Australia)	Henri Rochon; Dinny Pails	1; 6	4; 6	2; 6
2	(Canada) (Australia)	Brendan Macken; Geoff Brown	4; 6	4; 6	1; 6
3	(Canada) (Australia)	Edgar Lanthier / Gordon MacNeil; John Bromwich / Colin Long	2; 6	1; 6	0; 6
4	(Canada) (Australia)	Brendan Macken; Dinny Pails	4; 6	2; 6	2; 6
5	(Canada) (Australia)	Henri Rochon; Geoff Brown	3; 6	7; 9	2; 6

== Europe Zone ==
=== Draw ===
First Round; 2–4 May
Poland
bye
Great Britain
bye
Netherlands
bye
South Africa
bye
Ireland
bye
Yugoslavia
bye
Belgium	5
Luxembourg	0
Spain	2
Egypt	3
Greece	1
Switzerland	4
Sweden	2
Czechoslovakia	3
bye
Norway
bye
New Zealand
bye
France
bye
India
bye
Monaco
bye
Denmark

Second Round; 15–18 May
Warsaw, Poland (clay)
Poland	2
Great Britain	3
Amsterdam, Netherlands (clay)
Netherlands	1
South Africa	4
Dublin, Ireland (grass)
Ireland	2
Yugoslavia	3
Brussels, Belgium
Belgium	4
Egypt	1
Prague, Czechoslovakia
Switzerland	1
Czechoslovakia	4
Oslo, Norway (clay)
Norway	2
New Zealand	3
Paris, France (clay)
France	5
India	0
Monaco	w/o
Denmark

Quarterfinals; 30 May–1 June
Scarborough, England (grass)
Great Britain	1
South Africa	4
Brussels, Belgium
Yugoslavia	4
Belgium	1
Prague, Czechoslovakia
Czechoslovakia	5
New Zealand	0
Paris, France (clay)
France	5
Monaco	0

Semifinals; 13–16 June
Zagreb, Yugoslavia
South Africa	2
Yugoslavia	3
Prague, Czechoslovakia
Czechoslovakia	4
France	0

Final; 13–15 July
Zagreb, Yugoslavia
Yugoslavia	0
Czechoslovakia	4

=== Final ===
Yugoslavia vs. Czechoslovakia

Yugoslavia
0
Zagreb, Yugoslavia
13–15 July 1947

Czechoslovakia
4

			1	2	3	4	5
1	(Socialist Federal Republic of Yugoslavia) (Czechoslovakia)	Dragutin Mitić; Vladimír Černík	6; 3	0; 6	6; 2	1; 6	2; 6
2	(Socialist Federal Republic of Yugoslavia) (Czechoslovakia)	Josip Palada; Jaroslav Drobný	3; 6	6; 8	6; 2	3; 6
3	(Socialist Federal Republic of Yugoslavia) (Czechoslovakia)	Dragutin Mitić / Josip Palada; Vladimír Černík / Jaroslav Drobný	3; 6	1; 6	3; 6
4	(Socialist Federal Republic of Yugoslavia) (Czechoslovakia)	Dragutin Mitić; Jaroslav Drobný	6; 1	3; 6	4; 6	6; 4	1; 6
5	(Socialist Federal Republic of Yugoslavia) (Czechoslovakia)	Josip Palada; Ján Smolinský						not played

== Inter-Zonal Final ==
Australia vs. Czechoslovakia

Australia
4
Mount Royal Tennis Club, Montreal, Canada
14–16 August 1947
Grass

Czechoslovakia
1

			1	2	3	4	5
1	(Australia) (Czechoslovakia)	John Bromwich; Vladimír Černík	6; 1	6; 1	6; 1
2	(Australia) (Czechoslovakia)	Dinny Pails; Jaroslav Drobný	3; 6	4; 6	6; 4	4; 6
3	(Australia) (Czechoslovakia)	John Bromwich / Colin Long; Vladimír Černík / Jaroslav Drobný	6; 2	6; 2	6; 2
4	(Australia) (Czechoslovakia)	John Bromwich; Jaroslav Drobný	6; 2	7; 5	6; 4
5	(Australia) (Czechoslovakia)	Dinny Pails; Vladimír Černík	6; 3	4; 6	3; 6	6; 2	6; 3

== Challenge Round ==
United States vs. Australia

United States
4
West Side Tennis Club, Forest Hills, NY, United States
30 August–1 September 1947
Grass

Australia
1

			1	2	3	4	5
1	(United States) (Australia)	Jack Kramer; Dinny Pails	6; 2	6; 1	6; 2
2	(United States) (Australia)	Ted Schroeder; John Bromwich	6; 4	5; 7	6; 3	6; 4
3	(United States) (Australia)	Jack Kramer / Ted Schroeder; John Bromwich / Colin Long	4; 6	6; 2	2; 6	4; 6
4	(United States) (Australia)	Ted Schroeder; Dinny Pails	6; 3	8; 6	4; 6	9; 11	10; 8
5	(United States) (Australia)	Jack Kramer; John Bromwich	6; 3	6; 2	6; 2
