= Dick Savitt =

American tennis player (1927–2023)

- Savitt holding the 1951 Wimbledon men's trophy
- Full name: Richard Savitt
- Country (sports): United States
- Born: March 4, 1927 Bayonne, New Jersey, U.S.
- Died: January 6, 2023 (aged 95) Manhattan, New York, U.S.
- Height: 6 ft 3 in (1.91 m)
- Turned pro: 1944 (amateur tour)
- Retired: 1952 (played part-time afterwards)
- Plays: Right-handed (one-handed backhand)
- College: Cornell University (57–2 record in singles)
- Int. Tennis HoF: 1976 (member page)

Singles
- Career record: 320-105
- Career titles: 37
- Highest ranking: No. 1 (July 1951, The New York Times)

Grand Slam singles results
- Australian Open: W (1951)
- French Open: QF (1951, 1952)
- Wimbledon: W (1951)
- US Open: SF (1950, 1951)

Doubles

Grand Slam doubles results
- French Open: F (1951, 1952)
Medal record
Maccabiah Games
Gold medal – first place	1961 Israel	Men's Singles
Gold medal – first place	1961 Israel	Men's Doubles

Richard Savitt (March 4, 1927 – January 6, 2023) was an American tennis player.

In 1951, at the age of 24, he won both the Australian and Wimbledon men's singles championships. Savitt was mostly ranked world No. 2 the same year behind fellow amateur Frank Sedgman, but he was declared world No. 1 by The New York Times following his Wimbledon victory. He retired the following year to concentrate on a career in business. Savitt is one of four American men who have won both the Australian and British Championships in one year, following Don Budge (1938) and preceding Jimmy Connors (1974) and Pete Sampras (1994 and 1997). He won gold medals in both singles and men's doubles at the 1961 Maccabiah Games in Israel.

Savitt is enshrined in the International Tennis Hall of Fame, the Intercollegiate Tennis Association Men's Collegiate Tennis Hall of Fame, the USTA Eastern Tennis Hall of Fame, the International Jewish Sports Hall of Fame, and the National Jewish Sports Hall of Fame.

== Early life ==
Savitt was born in Bayonne, New Jersey to a Jewish family. He taught himself tennis at the age of 14 and never took a tennis lesson in his life. The self-taught Savitt made the finals of the New Jersey Boys Championship, and for two years, the National Boys Tennis Tournament before moving to the junior ranks. He and his family moved to El Paso, Texas, in 1944, as his mother had a bad skin condition and needed the warmer weather.

His first love was basketball, and when his family moved to Texas, he was an All-State forward and a co-captain of the basketball team at El Paso High School in 1944. Despite considering tennis his "second" sport after basketball, he won the Texas University Interscholastic League boys singles championship in 1944–1945. Nationally he was the 8th-ranked junior tennis player, and the 17th-ranked amateur overall.

In 1945, Savitt entered the Navy, stationed at the Naval Air Station in Memphis, Tennessee.

== College ==
Beginning in 1946, Savitt attended Cornell University, where he majored in economics, was a member of the Pi Lambda Phi fraternity, and he was elected a member of the Sphinx Head Society. However, two injuries, one to his knee, curtailed his basketball career.

Savitt resumed playing tennis. He became Cornell's tennis team captain and its #1 singles and doubles player. In 1947, he was ranked # 26 in the U.S., and two years later he was ranked # 17. In 1949 and 1950, as a junior and a senior, he won the Eastern Intercollegiate Tournament, and he won the doubles title with Leonard Steiner from 1948 to 1950. He was 57–2 in singles for his college career, and he graduated in June 1950.

== Post-college tennis career ==
Savitt ranked in the world's top 10 four times between 1951 and 1957 (# 2 in 1951); and in the U.S. top 10 six times between 1950 and 1959. That was despite the fact that Savitt did not compete in 1953–55. Among Savitt's major victories were the 1951 Wimbledon singles championship and the 1951 Australian Open. He also won the 1952, 1958, and 1961 USLTA National Indoor Championships, becoming the first player to win that crown three times, and won the Italian doubles. He won the Canadian singles and doubles championships in 1952.

=== 1950–1953 ===
In 1950, he won the Eastern Clay Court Championships defeating Don McNeill in the final in four sets and the New York State Championships defeating McNeill in a five-set final.

Still without any coaching, in 1950 Savitt reached the U. S. Tennis Championship semifinals at Forest Hills, losing to Art Larsen.

In 1951, at the age of 24, Savitt won the Wimbledon Singles Championship. Along the way he beat Larsen, the No. 1 U.S. player, in straight sets, and Herbert Flam, the No. 2 U.S. player. He won the Australian Open Singles title, winning in straight sets in the 61-minute final against Ken McGregor. He became the first American since Don Budge, 13 years earlier, to win both Wimbledon and the Australian Open in one season.

Savitt became the first Jewish male player to win either tournament. In the Jewish parts of North London, Savitt said "Nobody knew tennis there, but after I won people started picking up rackets". In addition, he became the first Jewish athlete to appear on the cover of Time magazine. The significance of a Jewish tennis player succeeding was rooted in the fact that tennis was still at the time primarily a country club sport, and many country clubs often did not allow Jews in as members and did not allow them to use their courts. This, in turn, kept many Jewish tennis players from obtaining the training they needed to compete at the highest levels.

Savitt was ranked second in the world in 1951. He was ranked the No. 1 player on the United States Davis Cup Team. He made it to the semifinals of the Australian Open in January 1952. In February 1952, he beat Bill Talbert to win the U.S. National Indoor championship. He won the Canadian singles and doubles championships in 1952, defeating Kurt Nielsen in the singles final in three straight sets. In September 1952, he beat Art Larsen to win the Pacific Coast men's singles tennis championship.

=== Davis Cup snub and retirement ===
In those days, to be Jewish in the top ranks of tennis was to encounter a certain amount of prejudice. ... when Dick Savitt won Wimbledon, his right to a place on the Davis Cup team was challenged in some circles because he was Jewish.

— Arthur Ashe

Savitt had played and won his three early 1951 matches in an exhibition against the Australian Davis Cup team, winning 9 of 10 sets as the American team beat Australia in the event. Allison Danzig, the senior American tennis writer, called him America's best hope for victory. He had defeated Frank Sedgman, Australia's best player, in the 1951 Australian Open. Ted Schroeder, who had lost all three of his Davis Cup matches while losing 9 out of 10 sets in the process the year before and who was in semi-retirement, was chosen by non-playing captain Frank Shields. Five of the top 10 players in the U.S. publicly accused Shields of "obvious prejudice" in his choosing the team. Without Savitt playing singles, and with Schroeder losing two of his three matches, the United States lost the 1951 Davis Cup to Australia.

The controversy spilled over into the next year when the 1951 nationally ranked players were bitterly debated at the January 1952 U.S. Lawn Tennis Association annual meeting. Members of the Association's Eastern, New England, Southern, Florida, and Texas delegations, whose chief spokesman was Gardnar Mulloy, were in favor of Savitt being named the No. 1 tennis player in the U.S. However, Shields attacked Savitt in a "biting", "unprecedented" speech, which observers said swung the vote against Savitt. As it was reported by Time magazine, "the loudest talker was Frank Shields, non-playing captain of the losing U.S. Davis Cup team. Shields had ignored Savitt in the Davis Cup matches, had put his confidence in aging (30) Ted Schroeder ... who turned out to be the goat of the series. Shields was intent on keeping Savitt ranked ... at No. 3. Cried Shields: 'Never once in the past three months has Savitt looked like a champion.'" Don McNeill, the 1940 U.S. champion, answered Shields' outburst by pointing out that players are ranked on their tennis ability, that personal prejudice should have nothing to do with ranking, and that Shields' remarks were "uncalled for". That met with "resounding applause" from the delegates. Australian Davis Cup team Harry Hopman called his arguments as to why Savitt should not be ranked No. 1 "weak". Still, a never-before-required proxy vote was needed to decide the No. 1 spot. Savitt was ranked the No. 2 player in the U.S. by the U.S. Lawn Tennis Association, behind Vic Seixas and directly ahead of Tony Trabert.

In February 1952, Savitt announced that he would play only one more tournament, the National Indoor Championships, and then retire from tournament tennis—at age 25. He later explained that there was insufficient money in the amateur game to support his needs, requiring him to pursue his business career. Savitt did not believe that anti-Semitism was the cause of his problems with Shields. Savitt had beaten Shields badly in the quarterfinals of the New Jersey State Championships in 1948. Also, Shields had been excluded from the 1933 U.S. Davis Cup team despite being ranked U.S. No. 1 for that year by the USLTA.

=== Part-time comeback ===
Savitt returned to the competitive tennis scene part-time in 1954. In April 1954 he won the clay court River Oaks Championshipsin Houston, Texas defeating Sven Davidson, Gardnar Mulloy, Vic Seixas, and Ham Richardson in the final, the latter three members of the U.S. Davis Cup team.

In August 1957 he won the Eastern Grass Court Championships at South Orange, New Jersey defeating U.S. Davis Cup players Ham Richardson and Vic Seixas in the final two rounds in best-of-five set matches.

In 1958, Savitt moved back to New York for business reasons and launched a part-time comeback in tennis. That year, he won his second National Indoors title, defeating Grant Golden, Kurt Nielsen, and Budge Patty in the final three rounds. In 1961, he captured his third—while remaining a weekend player, defeating Pierre Darmon, Chris Crawford, and U.S. No. 1 Whitney Reed in the final. In 1981, he and his son, Robert, won the U.S. Father-Son doubles title.

=== Maccabiah Games; Israel ===
In 1961, he won gold medals in both singles (defeating American Mike Franks in the final), and doubles (with Franks, defeating South Africans Rod Mandelstam and Julie Mayers), at the 1961 Maccabiah Games in Israel, the third-largest sporting event in the world. He was also very active in the Maccabi movement.

Savitt in addition helped develop the Israel Tennis Centers, beginning in 1973. In 1998, he was the ITA overseas tennis director. In his 2007 book The Big Book of Jewish Sports Heroes: An Illustrated Compendium of Sports History and The 150 Greatest Jewish Sports Stars, author Peter S. Horvitz ranked Savitt the 9th-greatest Jewish athlete of all time.

== Halls of fame ==
Savitt was inducted into the International Tennis Hall of Fame in 1976. Savitt was inducted into the International Jewish Sports Hall of Fame in 1979. He was inducted into the Intercollegiate Tennis Association Men's Collegiate Tennis Hall of Fame in 1986. Savitt was inducted into the National Jewish Sports Hall of Fame in 1998, and into the USTA Eastern Tennis Hall of Fame in 1999.

== After tennis ==
Following his competitive tennis career, Savitt entered the oil business in Louisiana. He then worked for Lehman Brothers, and in 1985, he joined Schroders. Savitt died on January 6, 2023, at the age of 95.

== Grand Slam finals ==
=== Singles (two titles) ===
Result	Year	Championship	Surface	Opponent	Score
Win	1951	Australian Championships	Grass	(Australia) Ken McGregor	6–3, 2–6, 6–3, 6–1
Win	1951	Wimbledon Championships	Grass	(Australia) Ken McGregor	6–4, 6–4, 6–4

=== Doubles (two runner-ups) ===
Result	Year	Championship	Surface	Partner	Opponents	Score
Loss	1951	French Championships	Clay	(United States) Gardnar Mulloy	(Australia) Ken McGregor (Australia) Frank Sedgman	2–6, 6–2, 7–9, 5–7
Loss	1952	French Championships	Clay	(United States) Gardnar Mulloy	(Australia) Ken McGregor (Australia) Frank Sedgman	3–6, 4–6, 4–6

Source: ITF

== Grand Slam performance timeline ==
Key
W	F	SF	QF	#R	RR	Q#	DNQ	A	NH

(W) winner; (F) finalist; (SF) semifinalist; (QF) quarterfinalist; (#R) rounds 4, 3, 2, 1; (RR) round-robin stage; (Q#) qualification round; (DNQ) did not qualify; (A) absent; (NH) not held; (SR) strike rate (events won / competed); (W–L) win–loss record.

Tournament	1944	1945	1946	1947	1948	1949	1950	1951	1952	1953-1955	1956	1957	1958	1959
Australian	A	A	A	A	A	A	A	W	SF	A	A	A	A	A
French	A	A	A	A	A	A	A	QF	QF	A	A	A	A	A
Wimbledon	A	A	A	A	A	A	A	W	QF	A	A	A	A	A
U.S.	1R	A	3R	2R	3R	1R	SF	SF	QF	A	QF	4R	QF	3R

Source: ITF

== See also ==
- List of select Jewish tennis players
