= Brendan Macken (tennis) =

Canadian tennis player (1923–2020)

- Full name: Brendan H. Macken
- Country (sports): Canada
- Born: 21 January 1923 Montreal, Quebec, Canada
- Died: 12 March 2020 (aged 97) Aurora, Ontario, Canada

Singles
- Career record: 46-34
- Career titles: 7

Grand Slam singles results
- Wimbledon: 1R (1951)
- US Open: 3R (1952)

Grand Slam doubles results
- Wimbledon: QF (1951)

Grand Slam mixed doubles results
- Wimbledon: 2R (1951)

Team competitions
- Davis Cup: F^{Am} (1947, 1951, 1952)

Brendan H. Macken (21 January 1923 – 12 March 2020) was a Canadian Open tennis champion and Davis Cup player. He was ranked the No. 1 tennis player in Canada for 1950 and 1952.

== Career ==
Originally from Montreal, Macken won the 1950 Canadian Open, in singles, by defeating defending champion Henri Rochon in the final in three straight sets. Macken had defeated French Davis Cup players Robert Haillet and Robert Abdesselam to reach the final. Despite this convincing victory, it would be his only Canadian Open championship singles title. He also won the doubles crown twice - in 1946 with his brother Jim and in 1951 partnering Lorne Main.

His tournament wins were concentrated from 1948 to 1952 and included the Quebec Championships in 1948, 1950, and 1952, the Ontario Championships in 1950 and 1952, and the West Jersey Championships in 1949.

Macken competed in nine consecutive United States National championships in singles, from 1945 through 1953. His best result was winning two matches to reach the third round in 1952. He also reached the last 32 in 1945 with a depleted field, which saw him as the No. 14 seed. Macken once competed in the main draw singles at Wimbledon, losing his only match in four sets to Kurt Nielsen.

=== Rankings ===
Macken was ranked Canadian No. 1 player in 1950, in which he won the Canadian Open, and in 1952, in which he won the Ontario and Quebec Championships.

=== Davis Cup ===
In Davis Cup, Macken played in 10 ties for Canada over 9 years, beginning in 1946. Canada's best result with Macken on board was defeating Mexico in 1952 to reach the America Zone final, where they lost to the U.S. 1-4. Macken won both of his singles matches against Mexico as Canada swept the tie, 5 matches to nil. He then took the only match off the Americans, beating Robert Perry in a dead fifth rubber. Macken's career match win–loss record was 6 and 8 in singles and 1 and 5 in doubles.
