= Fred Hagist =

American tennis player (1932–2005)

- Born: April 17, 1932 Berkeley, California, U.S.
- Died: June 27, 2005 (aged 73)
- College: University of California

Frederick Charles Hagist Jr. (April 17, 1932 – June 27, 2005) was an American tennis player in the 1950s who made it to the draw of several US Championships, including 1952 where he lost in the third round.

== Biography ==
Frederick Charles Hagist Jr. was born in Berkeley, California on April 17, 1932. He played collegiate tennis at the University of California from 1951 to 1953.

In 1952, in Cincinnati, Hagist upset top-seeded and NCAA singles champion Hugh Stewart in the semifinals to reach the singles final against Noel Brown. In that best-of-five-sets final, Hagist lost the first set, won the second and was down 0–2 in the third set when he strained a muscle on his right side. A doctor aided him in the locker room, but Hagist was forced to retire. Hagist was the first men's player to retire in a singles final in the history of the Cincinnati tournament, and one of only two in tournament history (the only other being Novak Djokovic in 2011, who retired against Andy Murray with a shoulder injury).

Hagist died on June 27, 2005, at the age of 73.
