= Mervyn Rose =

Australian tennis player

Mervyn Rose AM
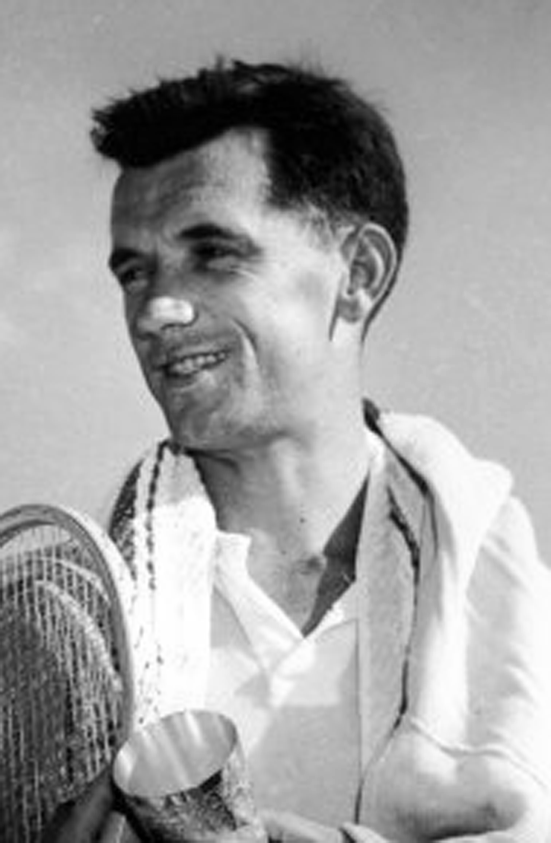
- Full name: Mervyn Gordon Rose
- Country (sports): Australia
- Born: 23 January 1930; Coffs Harbour, New South Wales, Australia
- Died: 24 July 2017 (aged 87); Coffs Harbour, New South Wales, Australia
- Turned pro: 1959 (amateur tour from 1949)
- Retired: 1972
- Plays: Left-handed (one-handed backhand)
- Int. Tennis HoF: 2001 (member page)

Singles
- Highest ranking: No. 3 (1958, Lance Tingay)

Grand Slam singles results
- Australian Open: W (1954)
- French Open: W (1958)
- Wimbledon: SF (1952, 1953, 1958)
- US Open: SF (1952)

Other tournaments
- Professional majors
- Wembley Pro: QF (1959)
- French Pro: QF (1959)
- TOC: 1R (1959^{FH})

Doubles

Grand Slam doubles results
- Australian Open: W (1954)
- French Open: F (1953, 1957)
- Wimbledon: W (1954)
- US Open: W (1952, 1953)

Grand Slam mixed doubles results
- French Open: F (1951, 1953)
- Wimbledon: W (1957)
- US Open: F (1951)

Mervyn Gordon Rose AM (23 January 1930 – 23 July 2017) was an Australian male tennis player who won seven Grand Slam titles (singles, doubles and mixed doubles).

== Career ==
Rose was born in Coffs Harbour, New South Wales, and turned professional in 1959. He was ranked inside the world's Top 10 throughout much of his tennis career and represented Australia in the Davis Cup from 1951 to 1957. He was ranked World No. 3 in 1958 by Lance Tingay of The Daily Telegraph.

Rose won the singles title at the 1954 Australian Championships in Sydney, defeating compatriot Rex Hartwig in the final in four sets. Four years later, in 1958, he became the French singles champion after a straight-sets victory in the final against Luis Ayala.

Rose won the 1953 Canadian Open singles title, defeating Hartwig in the final in three straight sets. His other career singles highlights include winning the Deauville Tennis Cup three times 1955, 1957, and 1958.

Rose became a professional in 1959 and played in tournaments with Kramer's group of contract players. He was officially ranked No. 9 in Kramer's point ranking system for 1959.

He coached numerous female and male players, including Billie Jean King, Margaret Court, Ernie Ewart, Michael Fancutt, Brett Prentice, Arantxa Sánchez Vicario, Eleni Daniilidou, Nadia Petrova, Magdalena Grzybowska and Caroline Schnieder.

Rose was awarded the Australian Sports Medal in 2000, inducted into the International Tennis Hall of Fame in 2001 and the Australian Tennis Hall of Fame in 2002. He was appointed a Member of the Order of Australia (AM) in the 2006 Australia Day Honours for service to tennis, particularly as a competitor at national and international levels and as a coach and mentor to both amateur and professional players. Rose died on 23 July 2017 at the age of 87.

== Grand Slam finals ==
=== Singles (2 titles, 1 runner-up) ===
Result	Year	Championship	Surface	Opponent	Score
Loss	1953	Australian Championships	Grass	(Australia) Ken Rosewall	0–6, 3–6, 4–6
Win	1954	Australian Championships	Grass	(Australia) Rex Hartwig	6–2, 0–6, 6–4, 6–2
Win	1958	French Championships	Clay	(Chile) Luis Ayala	6–3, 6–4, 6–4

=== Doubles (4 titles, 7 runners-up) ===
Result	Year	Championship	Surface	Partner	Opponents	Score
Loss	1951	US Championships	Grass	(Australia) Don Candy	(Australia) Ken McGregor (Australia) Frank Sedgman	8–10, 4–6, 6–4, 5–7
Loss	1952	Australian Championships	Grass	(Australia) Don Candy	(Australia) Ken McGregor (Australia) Frank Sedgman	4–6, 5–7, 3–6
Win	1952	US Championships	Grass	(United States) Vic Seixas	(Australia) Ken McGregor (Australia) Frank Sedgman	3–6, 10–8, 10–8, 6–8, 8–6
Loss	1953	Australian Championships	Grass	(Australia) Don Candy	(Australia) Lew Hoad (Australia) Ken Rosewall	11–9, 4–6, 8–10, 4–6
Loss	1953	French Championships	Clay	(Australia) Clive Wilderspin	(Australia) Lew Hoad (Australia) Ken Rosewall	2–6, 1–6, 1–6
Loss	1953	Wimbledon	Grass	(Australia) Rex Hartwig	(Australia) Lew Hoad (Australia) Ken Rosewall	4–6, 5–7, 6–4, 5–7
Win	1953	US Championships	Grass	(Australia) Rex Hartwig	(United States) Gardnar Mulloy (United States) Bill Talbert	6–4, 4–6, 6–2, 6–4
Win	1954	Australian Championships	Grass	(Australia) Rex Hartwig	(Australia) Neale Fraser (Australia) Clive Wilderspin	6–3, 6–4, 6–2
Win	1954	Wimbledon	Grass	(Australia) Rex Hartwig	(United States) Vic Seixas (United States) Tony Trabert	6–4, 6–4, 3–6, 6–4
Loss	1956	Australian Championships	Grass	(Australia) Don Candy	(Australia) Lew Hoad (Australia) Ken Rosewall	8–10, 11–13, 4–6
Loss	1957	French Championships	Clay	(Australia) Don Candy	(Australia) Malcolm Anderson (Australia) Ashley Cooper	3–6, 0–6, 3–6

=== Mixed doubles: 5 (1 title, 4 runner-ups) ===
Result	Year	Championship	Surface	Partner	Opponents	Score
Loss	1951	French Championships	Clay	(Australia) Thelma Coyne Long	(United States) Doris Hart (Australia) Frank Sedgman	5–7, 2–6
Loss	1951	Wimbledon	Grass	(Australia) Nancye Wynne Bolton	(United States) Doris Hart (Australia) Frank Sedgman	5–7, 2–6
Loss	1951	U.S. Championships	Grass	(United States) Shirley Fry	(United States) Doris Hart (Australia) Frank Sedgman	3–6, 2–6
Loss	1953	French Championships	Clay	(United States) Maureen Connolly	(United States) Doris Hart (United States) Vic Seixas	6–4, 4–6, 0–6
Win	1957	Wimbledon	Grass	(United States) Darlene Hard	(United States) Althea Gibson (Australia) Neale Fraser	6–4, 7–5

== Grand Slam tournament performance timeline ==
Key
W	F	SF	QF	#R	RR	Q#	DNQ	A	NH

(W) winner; (F) finalist; (SF) semifinalist; (QF) quarterfinalist; (#R) rounds 4, 3, 2, 1; (RR) round-robin stage; (Q#) qualification round; (DNQ) did not qualify; (A) absent; (NH) not held; (SR) strike rate (events won / competed); (W–L) win–loss record.

=== Singles ===
Tournament	1949	1950	1951	1952	1953	1954	1955	1956	1957	1958	1959	1960	1961	1962	1963	1964	1965	1966	1967	1968	1969	1970	1971	1972	SR
Australian Open	3R	QF	QF	SF	F	W	QF	QF	A	SF	A	A	A	A	A	A	A	A	A	A	A	A	1R	2R	1 / 11
French Open	A	3R	QF	4R	4R	QF	QF	A	SF	W	A	A	A	A	A	A	A	A	A	A	A	A	A	A	1 / 8
Wimbledon	A	3R	1R	SF	SF	QF	2R	A	QF	SF	A	A	A	A	A	A	A	A	A	A	A	A	A	A	0 / 8
US Open	A	2R	4R	SF	4R	A	A	A	A	A	A	A	A	A	A	A	A	A	A	A	A	A	A	A	0 / 4
Strike rate	0 / 1	0 / 4	0 / 4	0 / 4	0 / 4	1 / 3	0 / 3	0 / 1	0 / 2	1 / 3	0 / 0	0 / 0	0 / 0	0 / 0	0 / 0	0 / 0	0 / 0	0 / 0	0 / 0	0 / 0	0 / 0	0 / 0	0 / 1	0 / 1	2 / 31

== Other tournament records ==
- Italian Championships
  - Singles champion: 1958
  - Mixed Doubles runner-up: 1953, 1955
- German Championships
  - Singles champion: 1957
  - Men's Doubles champion: 1957
  - Mixed Doubles champion: 1957
- Canadian Championships
  - Singles champion: 1953
  - Men's Doubles champion: 1953
