= Ian Occleshaw =

Australian tennis player and coach

Ian Eric Occleshaw
- Born: 22 February 1928; Murrumbeena
- Died: 29 March 2015 (aged 87)
- Other name: (Mr) Occ
- Occupation: Professional Tennis Player Professional Tennis Coach
- Organization(s): Tennis Coaches Australia Victoria, Inc. (formerly PTAV)
- Title: President of the TACV
- Board member of: Tennis Australia Development Board (member) TCAV (president, secretary, member)
- Spouse(s): Marie Patricia Occleshaw, née Henshaw (14 May 1959 – 3 August 2022)
- Children: Mark Occleshaw, Tim Occleshaw

Ian Eric "Occ" Occleshaw (22 February 1928 – 29 March 2015) was an Australian professional tennis player and coach. He was a member of the Linton Cup team in 1947, managed Linton Cup and Wilson Cup teams on several occasions, coached Peter McNamara and Alan Stone and is one of the founders of Tennis Coaches Australia Victoria (TCAV). He worked on the Tennis Australia Development Board, was president, secretary and member of the board of TCAV.

Occleshaw died on 29 March 2015.

== Career ==
=== Playing ===
Australian Open
Year	Round	Opponent	Score
1949	R64	Gordon Schwartz	0–6, 7–9, 2–6
1950	R64	H Raward	6–0, 6–1, 6–0
	R32	Jack Crawford	1–6, 7–5, 3–6, 6–3, 6–4
	R 16	Frank Sedgman	1–6, 0–6, 1–6

=== Coaching ===
Occleshaw commenced coaching in 1951. He was the head coach at Glen Iris (30 years), school coach at St Catherienes (30 years) and Corowa (35 years) owned four courts in West Coburg, was the resident pro, with Don Tregonning, at the Kooyong Lawn Tennis Club (20 years) and coached squads in the United States. He was Peter McNamara's and Alan Stone's personal coach.

=== Management ===
Occleshaw owned four courts in West Coburg, managed the Linton Cup team and Wilson Cup team, conducted tournaments for the Glen Iris Recreational Club (Glen Iris' Junior tournament – 30 years), TCAV (TCAV juniors – 7 years) and the Victorian government (Victorian schoolboys/schoolgirls tournaments – 8 years). He started and ran solidarity clinics in Brunei and Fiji, was a member of the Tennis Australia Development Board (8 years), a State Selector for the VTA (20 years), president, secretary and member of the TCAV board.

== Ian Occleshaw Award ==
Occleshaw is the namesake of the Ian Occleshaw Award, which has been awarded by TCAV since 2014.

Ian Occleshaw Award
Year	Recipient
2014	Ron Carter – Frankston Tennis Club
2016	Frank Sedgman
2018	Cedric Mason

== Ian Occleshaw Trophy ==
Occleshaw is the namesake of the Ian Occleshaw Trophy, which has been awarded to the best performing Pennant team by the Glen Iris Recreational Club since 2016.

Ian Occleshaw Trophy
Year	Recipient
2016	Nat Edwards
	Louise Anderson
	Hanna Steemson
	Monica Nguyen
	Jayme Waites
	Peneolpe Panogopoulos
2017	Ladies Grade 3 Team
