= George Worthington (tennis) =

Australian tennis player

- Full name: George Allan Worthington
- Country (sports): Australia
- Born: 10 October 1928; Sydney, Australia
- Died: 8 December 1964 (aged 36); Westminster, London
- Turned pro: 1956 (amateur from 1945)
- Retired: 1960
- Plays: Right-handed (one-handed backhand)

Singles
- Career record: 319-115 (73.5%)
- Career titles: 25

Grand Slam singles results
- Australian Open: QF (1949, 1950, 1951, 1954)
- French Open: 3R (1950, 1955)
- Wimbledon: 4R (1949, 1953)
- US Open: 3R (1950)
- Professional majors
- Wembley Pro: QF (1957)
- French Pro: 1R (1958, 1959)

Doubles

Grand Slam doubles results
- Australian Open: F (1947)
- Wimbledon: SF (1955)
- US Open: F (1949)

Mixed doubles

Grand Slam mixed doubles results
- Australian Open: W (1951, 1952, 1955)
- Wimbledon: SF (1949, 1950, 1953)

George Allan Worthington (10 October 1928 – 8 December 1964) was an Australian male tennis player who was active in the 1940s and 1950s.

== Career ==
Worthington won the mixed doubles title at the Australian Championships in 1951, 1952 and 1953 together with Thelma Coyne Long.

He was twice runner-up with compatriot Frank Sedgman in Grand Slam men's doubles championship. In 1947 they lost the final of the Australian Championship against Adrian Quist and John Bromwich in straight sets and in 1949 in the U.S. National Championship they met the same fate against fellow Australians John Bromwich and Bill Sidwell.

He won a number of career singles titles including the Australian Capital Territory Championships (later called the ACT Open) (1953), the British Pro Championships six times consecutively from 1957 to 1962, the Slazenger Pro Championships two times, (1957, 1962), the Sydney Metropolitan Championships three times, (1950, 1953–54), and the Surrey Championships one time, (1953), the East of England Championships one time, (1949) and the New Zealand Championships one time, (1950).

After his active playing career he became coach at the All-England Lawn Tennis Club and coached both the English Davis Cup team and Wightman Cup team.

According to Ken Rosewall, he was "an excellent player in practice. He was known as the 'Champion of Practice'".

== Grand Slam finals ==
=== Doubles (2 runner-ups) ===
Result	Year	Championship	Surface	Partner	Opponents	Score
Loss	1947	Australian Championships	Grass	(Australia) Frank Sedgman	(Australia) Adrian Quist (Australia) John Bromwich	1–6, 3–6, 1–6
Loss	1949	U.S. National Championships	Grass	(Australia) Frank Sedgman	(Australia) John Bromwich (Australia) Bill Sidwell	4–6, 0–6, 1–6

=== Mixed doubles (3 titles) ===
Result	Year	Championship	Surface	Partner	Opponents	Score
Win	1951	Australian Championships	Grass	(Australia) Thelma Coyne Long	(Australia) Clare Proctor (Australia) Jack May	6–4, 3–6, 6–2
Win	1952	Australian Championships	Grass	(Australia) Thelma Coyne Long	(Australia) Gwen Thiele (Australia) Tom Warhurst	9–7, 7–5
Win	1955	Australian Championships	Grass	(Australia) Thelma Coyne Long	(Australia) Jenny Staley (Australia) Lew Hoad	6–2, 6–1
