= Henri Rochon =

Canadian tennis player

- Country (sports): Canada
- Born: 12 March 1924 Montreal, Quebec, Canada
- Died: 5 February 2005 (aged 80) Montreal, Quebec, Canada

Singles
- Career record: 102-81
- Career titles: 6

Grand Slam singles results
- Wimbledon: 2R (1951)
- US Open: 4R (1951)

Grand Slam doubles results
- Wimbledon: 2R (1951)

Grand Slam mixed doubles results
- Wimbledon: 1R (1951)

Team competitions
- Davis Cup: F^{Am} (1947, 1951, 1952, 1953, 1955)

Henri Rochon (12 March 1924 – 5 February 2005) was a Canadian Open champion and Davis Cup tennis player.

Born in Montreal, Rochon won the Canadian Open, the precursor to today's Rogers Cup ATP 1000 Series event, in 1949, defeating fellow Canadian Lorne Main in the final. He was also a three-time finalist, losing to American William Tully in 1948; to Canadian Brendan Macken in 1950; and to fellow Québécois Robert Bédard in 1955.

Rochon appeared in U.S. National Championship fourteen consecutive times in singles, beginning in 1945. His best result came in 1951 when he reached the fourth round. In that round, he leveled his match with No. 5 seed Tony Trabert at a set all before falling in four. In the same year, he made his only Wimbledon Championships appearance, reaching the second round.

Rochon won the Ontario Championships in 1947 and 1949 at the Toronto Lawn Tennis Club on red clay, defeating Brendan Macken in the 1947 semifinal.

Rochon won the Adirondack Invitation on clay in 1955, defeating Ricardo Balbiers of Chile in the final.

In the Davis Cup, Rochon played matches for Canada every year from 1946 through 1953 as well as in 1955 and 1956. All ties he played in, except for the last one, were home fixtures and took place at the Mount Royal Tennis Club in Montreal on a grass surface, although the Canadian players were clay specialists. (The final one was played away against the Caribbean, in Trinidad). As with most other Canadians of that era, Rochon never beat an American or Australian player in 8 matches, losing all 24 sets. Against Mexico, his match win–loss record was 2 wins, 4 losses in singles and 1 and 1 in doubles; as a team, Canada, featuring Rochon, lost two ties to Mexico in the late 1940s before winning two in the 1950s. Canada's best result during that time was reaching the America zone Final five times – 1947, 1951, 1952, 1953, and 1955. Each time, however, they would come up against either the U.S. or Australia. (At the time there were two zones – Europe and America, with the latter being essentially a 'rest of the world' zone.)

== Sources ==
- ITF Circuit profile page
- 2010 Rogers Cup online media guide
- Davis Cup profile/activity page
