= Bill Tully =

American tennis player (1925–2016)

William J. Tully
- Full name: William Joseph Tully
- Country (sports): USA
- Born: 9 December 1925 Bronxville, New York, United States
- Died: 21 July 2016 (aged 90) Pelham Manor, New York, United States
- Retired: 1971

Singles
- Career titles: 20+

Grand Slam singles results
- US Open: 1942, 1948, 1951, 1952 (2R), 1953, 1954 (2R), 1955–1957, 1959, 1962, 1963, 1966

William Tully (9 December 1925 – 21 July 2016) was an American tennis player from the early 1940s to the early 1970s.

== Career ==
Tully was the son of Leo and Catharine Tully. After graduating from Iona Preparatory School, he attended the University of Notre Dame, earning a double major. He was a commissioned officer in the US Navy Air Corps and following graduation, joined the family publishing business before going onto join the New York Stock Exchange as a seat owner and specialist.

Tully lost in the first round of the US championships to Bill Talbert in 1942. He would play in thirteen total between 1942 and 1966.

In 1948 he achieved the biggest tournament victory of his career when he won the Canadian championships. The Toronto Star said Tully "looks something like Jack Kramer". The Montreal Gazette, describing his final victory in straight sets over Henri Rochon said Tully "beat him (Rochon) at drop shots, the Canadian Davis Cup player's favorite game". After the match Rochon said "everything he did was perfect. I had a chance in the second set but he was too good".

Amongst many tournament victories, he won the New York State Championship three times, his last title coming in 1966 when he was 40 years old.

After retiring from the circuit, Tully continued to play in senior competitions. He won the US National Grandfather-Grandson Championship four times with three different grandsons. Tully married and had nine children.
