= Frank Sedgman =

Australian tennis player (born 1927)

Frank Sedgman AO
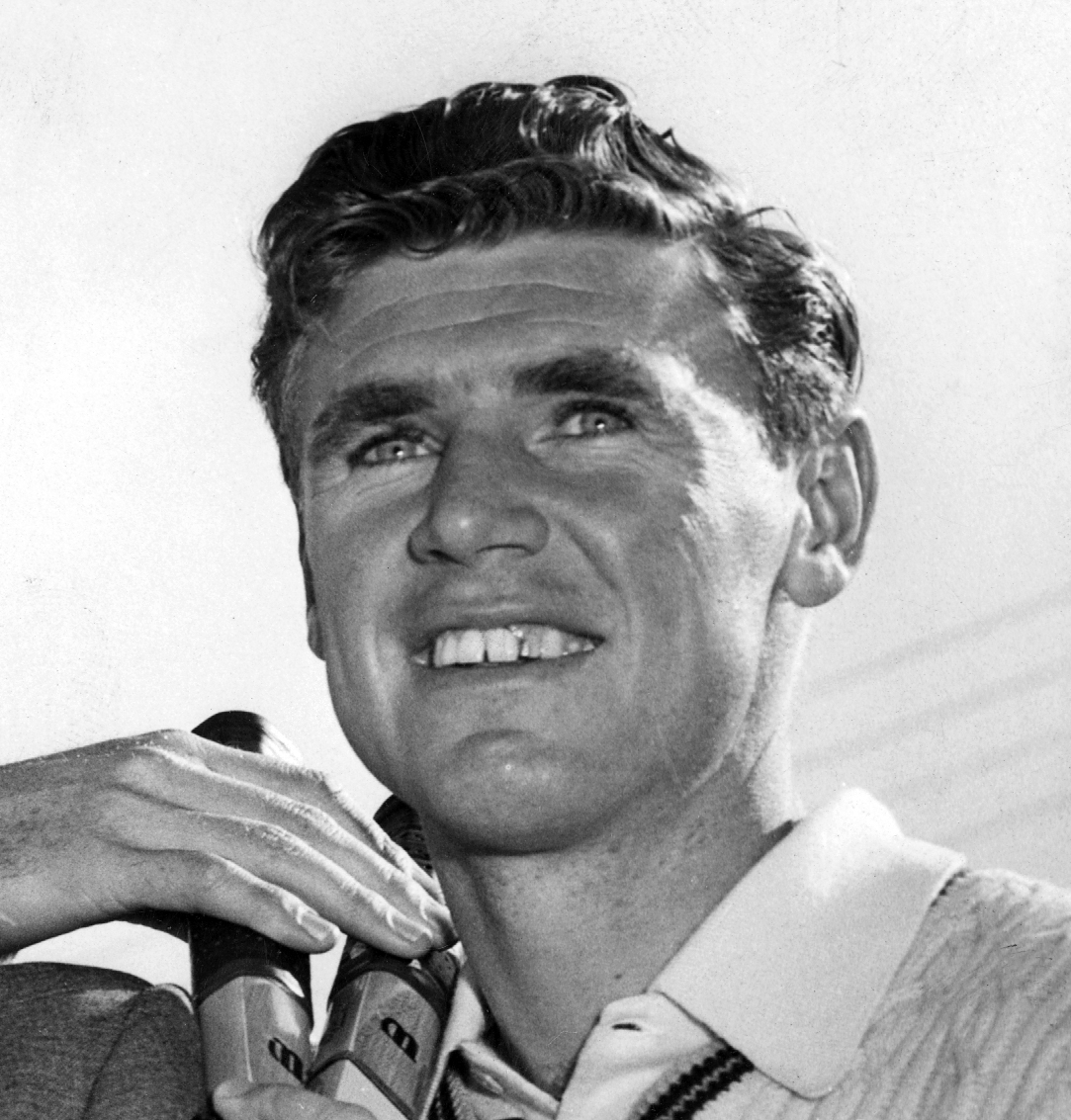
- Full name: Francis Arthur Sedgman
- Country (sports): Australia
- Born: 29 October 1927 (age 99) Mont Albert, Victoria, Australia
- Height: 180 cm (5 ft 11 in)
- Turned pro: 1953 (amateur tour from 1945)
- Retired: 1976
- Plays: Right-handed (one-handed backhand)
- Int. Tennis HoF: 1979 (member page)

Singles
- Career record: 863–516 (62.5%)
- Career titles: 49
- Highest ranking: No. 1 (1950, Harry Hopman, Ned Potter.)

Grand Slam singles results
- Australian Open: W (1949, 1950)
- French Open: F (1952)
- Wimbledon: W (1952)
- US Open: W (1951, 1952)

Other tournaments
- Professional majors
- US Pro: F (1954, 1961)
- Wembley Pro: W (1953, 1958)
- French Pro: W (1953)
- Other pro events
- TOC: F (1957^{AU}, 1957^{FH}, 1958^{AU})

Doubles
- Career record: 5–13

Grand Slam doubles results
- Australian Open: W (1951, 1952)
- French Open: W (1951, 1952)
- Wimbledon: W (1948, 1951, 1952)
- US Open: W (1950, 1951)

Grand Slam mixed doubles results
- Australian Open: W (1949, 1950)
- French Open: W (1951, 1952)
- Wimbledon: W (1951, 1952)
- US Open: W (1951, 1952)

Francis Arthur Sedgman AO (born 29 October 1927) is an Australian former world No. 1 tennis player. Over the course of a three-decade career, Sedgman won five Grand Slam singles tournaments as an amateur as well as 9 Grand Slam doubles tournaments. He is one of only five tennis players all-time to win multiple career Grand Slams in two disciplines, alongside Margaret Court, Roy Emerson, Martina Navratilova and Serena Williams. In 1951, he and Ken McGregor won the Grand Slam in men's doubles. Sedgman turned professional in 1953, and won the Wembley World Professional Indoor singles title in 1953 and 1958. He also won the Sydney Masters tournament in 1958, and the Melbourne Professional singles title in 1959. He won the Grand Prix de Europe Professional Tour in 1959.

Sedgman was ranked as the world No. 1 amateur in 1950 by Harry Hopman and Ned Potter, in 1951 by Pierre Gillou, Hopman and Potter and in 1952 by Lance Tingay, Gillou, Hopman and Potter. Tennis de France magazine ranked Sedgman as the world No. 1 professional tennis player for the 1953 season. Jack Kramer, in his personal ranking lists, ranked Sedgman as the world No. 2 professional behind Pancho Gonzales for the 1958, 1959 and 1960 seasons.

== Career ==
=== Amateur ===
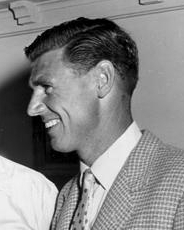
Frank Sedgman

Sedgman was a 180 centimetres (5 ft 11 in) right-hander who played the serve-and-volley game that had just been popularised by Jack Kramer. He was one of a number of Australian players who used the Continental grip in which the racquet is held the same way for both the forehand and the backhand. He was particularly known for his volleying and speed at the net. When asked in 2005 who was the best player he had ever faced, Mervyn Rose replied, "Hopman's pet, Sedgie."

Sedgman led the Australian Davis Cup team to victory in 1950, 1951, and 1952. In a five-year span from 1948 to 1952 Sedgman won 22 Grand Slam titles in singles, doubles, and mixed doubles. Sedgman and his partner Ken McGregor were the only men's doubles team to ever win the Grand Slam in a single year—they won all four majors in 1951. The following year they also won the first three majors, then, at Forest Hills, were upset by a pick-up team of another Australian, Mervyn Rose, and an American Vic Seixas, denying them eight consecutive Grand Slam victories. According to Rose in a 2005 interview, Harry Hopman, the coach of the Australian team, would not talk to him for two months afterwards.

==== 1945 ====
Although still playing in the junior events in Australian tournaments in 1945, Sedgman began to enter the men's singles events as well. In June, he lost a close match to Jack Harper at the Elsternwick tournament. In December, at the Victorian championships, Sedgman beat Noel Kirkby before losing to Adrian Quist. Writing in The Melbourne Herald, renowned coach Harry Hopman called Sedgman a "potential champion". Hopman also said, "it is about a year ago that I advised him (Sedgman) to go to a gymnasium. The work he has done there – about three times a week after his work – has put on a stone in weight and improved him in many ways. His legs, wind and stamina are now first class. His temperament, too, is good".

==== 1946 ====
Sedgman began the year by reaching the final of the South Australian championships in Adelaide, where he lost to John Bromwich. Writing in The Sydney Morning Herald, Bromwich said, "Sedgman was not inclined to indulge in long drawn-out-rallies, and after the ball crossed the net three or four times, he either endeavoured to force the play or strived for an outright placement". Sedgman made his debut at the Australian Championships in 1946. He won his first match against Reg Clements, but lost in the last 16 round, to Geoff Brown in straight sets. Brown played "faultlessly throughout", whilst Sedgman was "not able to settle down, and did not look comfortable".

==== 1947 ====
In 1947, Sedgman lost in the opening round of the Australian Championships to Patrick Callaghan. It was his second appearance in the singles. He also won the Victorian Hardcourt Championships in June, beating Lionel Brodie in the final. The final was played in a strong wind. It was a "closely contested final, which produced some brilliant tennis under most difficult conditions". At the Australian hardcourt championships in Toowoomba in November, Sedgman was suffering from strained muscles in his right shoulder in the final against Quist and lost in straight sets.

==== 1948 ====
At the 1948 Australian championships, Sedgman beat veteran former champion Jack Crawford before losing to Bromwich in the quarterfinals. At the West Australian championships in March, Sedgman beat Colin Long in straight sets in the final. According to the Melbourne Age, Sedgman's success was "due to stronger driving, more powerful service and greater all-court agility". At the French championships, Sedgman lost in the last 16 to Giovanni Cucelli. In June, Sedgman won the Kent championships, beating fellow Australian Jack Harper in the final. At Wimbledon, he lost in the last 16 to eventual winner Bob Falkenburg. At the U.S. Championships, Sedgman lost in the last 16 to Frank Parker. Sedgman lost in the final of the New South Wales championship to Bromwich.

==== 1949 ====
At the Australian Championships in January 1949, Sedgman beat defending champion Quist in the quarter-finals and former champion Bromwich in the final to win his first Grand Slam singles title. Sedgman "gave a flawless exhibition of attacking tennis" in the final against Bromwich. Bromwich was now 30, whilst Sedgman was 21. In the Gold Cup final at Toowoomba in April, Sedgman beat Brian Strohfeldt in the final. At Wimbledon, Sedgman had two match points against Ted Schroeder in the quarterfinals, but lost in five sets. Sedgman lost to Schroeder again in a five set quarterfinal at the U.S. Championships.

==== 1950 ====
Sedgman began the year by winning the South Australian championships in Adelaide, beating Jaroslav Drobny in the final in three straight sets, losing only three games. Sedgman won his second Australian Championships men's singles title, beating Bromwich, Eric Sturgess and Ken McGregor. Sedgman's superior groundstrokes were a key factor in his victory over McGregor. Sedgman won the West Australian Championships beating Clive Wilderspin in the final, showing a "much superior brand of tennis" than he had in earlier rounds. He then won the Australian Hardcourt Championships beating George Worthington in the final. At the French Championships, Sedgman was seeded second, but surprisingly lost in the last 16 to Irvin Dorfman. At Wimbledon, Sedgman was top seeded. He beat Art Larsen and Drobny (both from two sets to love down), before losing the final to Budge Patty in four sets. Sedgman lost in the last 16 of the U.S. Championships to Earl Cochell. In September, Sedgman won the Pacific Southwest Championships in straight sets against Schroeder, though Schroeder was suffering from a knee injury in the latter stages. In November, Sedgman beat reigning U.S. singles champion Larsen in straight sets in the final of the Queensland Championships. Larsen beat Sedgman in the final of the New South Wales Championships, but in December, Sedgman beat Larsen in the final of the Victorian Championships Sedgman was ranked world No. 1 amateur by Harry Hopman and by Ned Potter.

==== 1951 ====
Sedgman began the year by winning the South Australian Championships, beating Larsen in the final. He failed in his bid to win a hat-trick of Australian singles titles, when he lost in the semifinals of the 1951 championships to Dick Savitt. Sedgman beat Rose in the final of the MCC championships in Melbourne in March and later in the month was victorious in the Australian hardcourt tournament in Tasmania over Don Candy. Sedgman lost to Drobny in the semifinals of the French Championships. Top-seeded at Wimbledon, Sedgman led by two sets to love against Herbert Flam in the quarterfinals, but lost in five sets. At the Newport championships in August, Sedgman beat Mervyn Rose in the final to become the first overseas winner of the men's singles since 1916. At the U.S. Championships, Sedgman beat Bill Talbert, Tony Trabert, Larsen and Vic Seixas to win the title. He then retained his Pacific Southwest title in Los Angeles, beating Trabert in the final, by manoeuvering him out of position. Sedgman beat Ian Ayre in the final of the Queensland championships in November. In December, Sedgman beat three of the best American amateurs Trabert, Seixas and Savitt to win the Victorian Championships. In late 1951, Sedgman was tempted to turn professional for 1952. Harry Hopman, however, led a fund-raising drive via his newspaper column in the Melbourne Herald to keep Sedgman an amateur. Enough money was raised to purchase a gasoline station in the name of Sedgman's future bride. Sedgman remained an amateur for another year. Sedgman was ranked world No. 1 amateur No. 1 by Pierre Gillou, Harry Hopman and Ned Potter.

==== 1952 ====
Sedgman began the year in January by winning the Manly seaside tournament beating McGregor in the final. Later in the month, Sedgman lost to his doubles partner McGregor in the final of the Australian Championships. Sedgman won the Asian Championships in February beating Tony Mottram in the final. Sedgman won titles in Cannes in March (over Milo Branovic) and in Beaulieu in April (over Philippe Washer). At the French Championships, Sedgman beat Patty and Sturgess before losing in the final to Drobny, but Sedgman had beaten Drobny in the finals of the Monte Carlo tournament and the Italian Championships. Sedgman had a successful tour of Britain, where he won the Sutton event in April, the Harrogate tournament in May beating Sturgess in the final, the Northern tournament in June over Candy and the Queens club tournament over Rose. Sedgman also won his first Wimbledon singles title (it was the third year in a row he had been number one seed). In 2012, Sedgman said "You always wanted to win the Wimbledon title and I had offers to turn professional before I won Wimbledon and I had put it off because I thought, gee, I wanted to win the Wimbledon title to cap your career, really, as an amateur". To win the Wimbledon title, Sedgman beat Sturgess, Rose and Drobny. Sedgman won the Velbert tournament in July beating Sturgess in the final. Sedgman beat Rose to win the Newport tournament in August. At the U.S. Championships, Sedgman beat Lew Hoad, Rose and Gardnar Mulloy to retain his title. In November, Sedgman (hampered by a blistered hand) beat 18 year old Ken Rosewall in five sets in the semifinals of the Queensland Championships before overcoming Rose in five sets in the final. Sedgman won the New South Wales Championships over McGregor. Sedgman was ranked world No. 1 amateur by Lance Tingay, Pierre Gillou, Harry Hopman and Ned Potter. Sedgman turned professional at the end of the year.

=== Professional ===
==== 1953 ====
Sedgman faced Jack Kramer in the 1953 World Series tour. Sedgman began the tour well and opened up an 11–6 lead (Kramer had been suffering from the flu during several matches). However, by winning in Houston on 11 March, Kramer opened up a 28–19 lead. In the end, Kramer won 54 matches to 41. The tour grossed $860,000. Sedgman won the tournament at Wembley beating Don Budge and Pancho Gonzales (both in straight sets). Sedgman won the tournament in Paris, beating Gonzales in the final. Sedgman beat Dinny Pails and Segura at Vienna and Geneva. Tennis de France magazine ranked Sedgman as the world No. 1 professional tennis player for the 1953 season. This gave Sedgman world number one rankings for both the amateur tennis world and for the contract tennis professionals in his career record.

==== 1954–1955 ====
In 1954, Sedgman competed in the World Series alongside Gonzales, Pancho Segura, Budge, Bobby Riggs and Carl Earn. On the opening night of the tour at Madison Square Garden, Sedgman led Gonzales by a set and 5–3, but Gonzales took the second set 11-9 and the third set 13–11 to claim victory. Gonzales went on to win the series. Sedgman was runner-up to Gonzales in the Cleveland version of the U.S. Pro, played under the billed name of Cleveland World Pro Championships. In September and October, Sedgman won a 4-man tour of Asia over Gonzales, Segura, and Kramer. In November, Sedgman won the Australian professional championships in Perth beating Gonzales and then Segura in the final. Sedgman toured Australia in 1954–55 with Gonzales, Segura, McGregor and Ian Ayre. Gonzales won the tour. Sedgman missed approximately four and a half months tennis in 1955 due to an operation for appendicitis.

==== 1956–1957 ====
Sedgman missed the first 5 1/2 months of 1956. In September 1956, Sedgman beat Tony Trabert in the semi-finals of the tournament at Wembley, but lost in the final to Gonzales, despite leading by a set and 4–1. Sedgman won round robin tournaments at Brisbane and Kooyong in December against Trabert, Segura, and Hartwig. In 1957, Sedgman won the Perth round robin event in January beating Segura, Rex Hartwig and Trabert. Sedgman beat Ken Rosewall in three straight sets in 57 minutes in their first match against each other as professionals in the semifinals at the Ampol Tournament of Champions at White City, Sydney, in February. Sedgman lost to Segura in the final. Sedgman finished runner-up to Gonzales at the Forest Hills Tournament of Champions (played on a round-robin basis) despite losing his opening match to Hoad, as he won against Rosewall, Trabert, and Segura. He lost the deciding match to Gonzales in five sets, although he led two sets to one.

==== 1958 ====
In February 1958, Sedgman won the Ampol Masters Pro at the White City stadium, Sydney, earning him AUS£2,000 in first-prize money. He defeated both Gonzales and Trabert in five set matches to win the tournament. Kramer designated the Sydney Masters of 1958 as one of the four major professional tournaments. At Wembley in 1958, Sedgman beat Gonzales in the semifinals and Trabert in the final to win his second Wembley title, five years after his first. Kramer ranked Sedgman No. 2 in his pro ranking for 1958.

==== 1959 ====
Sedgman won the Melbourne event in the Ampol world series in January 1959, defeating Gonzales in the final in three straight sets. The match was played outdoors on a slow wooden court at the Olympic Velodrome. Sedgman reached the final of the Ampol series event at Toronto on red clay, beating Segura and Hoad before losing the final to Gonzales. Sedgman won the Grand Prix de Europe tour in 1959, finishing ahead of Rosewall, Hoad, and Trabert. Sedgman beat Segura and Hoad before losing to Trabert in the final of the French Pro at Roland Garros in September, also an Ampol series event. Sedgman finished fourth in Kramer's official Ampol point ranking for the year behind Hoad, Gonzales, and Rosewall.

Jack Kramer ranked Sedgman as the world No. 2 professional player in his personal ranking list (as distinct from Kramer's point ranking) for the 1959 season behind Gonzales and ahead of Rosewall and Hoad.

==== 1960–1965 ====
By the 1960s, Sedgman's career was declining, although Kramer ranked Sedgman as the world No. 2 professional player behind Gonzales and ahead of Rosewall and Hoad for the 1960 season. Sedgman was runner-up to Gonzales at the Cleveland event in 1961. In November 1962, Sedgman won the White City Charity event at Sydney, beating Luis Ayala in the final. Sedgman entered a period of retirement from the professional tour at the end of 1965.

=== Open era ===
Open tennis arrived in 1968. Sedgman returned to play in Grand Slam events at the 1970 Australian Open, where he lost in five sets in the second round to former champion Bill Bowrey. Sedgman won the Victorian Hardcourt Championships in October 1970 beating John Stephens in the final and won the title again in 1971 beating Neale Fraser in the final, a few days before his 44th birthday (he had won his first Victorian hardcourt title 24 years earlier in 1947). He reached the third round at Wimbledon in 1971. At the 1972 Australian Open, Sedgman beat fifth seed Owen Davidson before losing in the third round to John Cooper. He continued to play professionally until his 1976 retirement. His last appearance in the Australian Championships men's singles in 1976 was 30 years after his first appearance (a record span at Australian Championships men's singles).

== Personal life ==
Frank Sedgman was born to Edith and Arthur Sedgman on 29 October 1927 in Mont Albert, Victoria. He was the first of four children, with one brother Bob, and two sisters Kathleen and Sandra. Sedgman attended Box Hill State School, Blackburn State School, then Box Hill High School, leaving school at 16. He first played tennis at the Blackburn Tennis Club.

Sedgman married Jean Sedgman (Née. Spence) on the 30th of January 1952 at the Toorak Presbyterian Church. The couple has since had children and grandchildren. Grandson Steven Greene played for the Hawthorn Football Club.

== Broadcasting and promoting ==
Sedgman commentated on various Australian TV channels (mainly on broadcasts of Davis Cup matches or Australian championships) from 1960 to 1976. In 1972, the LTAA appointed Tennis Camps of Australia to promote the Australian Open (Sedgman, Jim and Doug Reid and John Brown were the directors). The first year that Tennis Camps promoted the event (the 1973 event which began in December 1972 and concluded in January 1973) was also the first year that Channel Seven televised the event. "I remember we gave the TV rights away (for nothing), so that we could get publicity for the event" said Sedgman. Sedgman was one of the commentators for Channel 7 in the mid-1970s. He commentated on the Newcombe v Connors final of 1975, lost in the second round of the men's singles that year and was still involved in promoting the event. Tennis Camps ceased to promote the event in the early 1980s.

== Honours ==
Sedgman was inducted into the International Tennis Hall of Fame in Newport, Rhode Island and was made a Member of the Order of Australia in 1979; in 1985 he was inducted into the Sport Australia Hall of Fame. and was upgraded to Legend in 2026. He received an Australian Sports Medal in 2000. Sedgman was appointed an Officer of the Order of Australia (AO) in the 2019 Queen's Birthday Honours for "distinguished service to tennis as a player at the national and international level, and as a role model for young sportspersons". In his 1979 autobiography, Jack Kramer, the long-time tennis promoter and player, included Sedgman in his list of the 21 greatest players of all time. In 2019 he was made an Officer in the Order of Australia.

== Major finals ==
=== Grand Slam tournaments ===
==== Singles: 8 (5 titles, 3 runner-ups) ====
| Result | Year | Championship | Surface | Opponent | Score |
|---|---|---|---|---|---|
| Win | 1949 | Australian Championships | Grass | (Australia) John Bromwich | 6–3, 6–2, 6–2 |
| Win | 1950 | Australian Championships | Grass | (Australia) Ken McGregor | 6–3, 6–4, 4–6, 6–1 |
| Loss | 1950 | Wimbledon Championships | Grass | (United States) Budge Patty | 1–6, 10–8, 2–6, 3–6 |
| Win | 1951 | US Championships | Grass | (United States) Vic Seixas | 6–4, 6–1, 6–1 |
| Loss | 1952 | Australian Championships | Grass | (Australia) Ken McGregor | 5–7, 10–12, 6–2, 2–6 |
| Loss | 1952 | French Championships | Clay | (Egypt) Jaroslav Drobný | 2–6, 0–6, 6–3, 4–6 |
| Win | 1952 | Wimbledon Championships | Grass | (Egypt) Jaroslav Drobný | 4–6, 6–2, 6–3, 6–2 |
| Win | 1952 | US Championships | Grass | (United States) Gardnar Mulloy | 6–1, 6–2, 6–3 |

==== Doubles: 14 (9 titles, 5 runner-ups) ====
| Result | Year | Championship | Surface | Partner | Opponents | Score |
|---|---|---|---|---|---|---|
| Loss | 1947 | Australian Championships | Grass | (Australia) George Worthington | (Australia) John Bromwich (Australia) Adrian Quist | 1–6, 3–6, 1–6 |
| Loss | 1948 | Australian Championships | Grass | (Australia) Colin Long | (Australia) John Bromwich (Australia) Adrian Quist | 6–1, 8–6, 7–9, 3–6, 6–8 |
| Loss | 1948 | French Championships | Clay | (Australia) Harry Hopman | (Sweden) Lennart Bergelin (Czechoslovakia) Jaroslav Drobný | 6–8, 1–6, 10–12 |
| Win | 1948 | Wimbledon | Grass | (Australia) John Bromwich | (United States) Tom Brown (United States) Gardnar Mulloy | 5–7, 7–5, 7–5, 9–7 |
| Loss | 1949 | U.S. Championships | Grass | (Australia) George Worthington | (United States) John Bromwich (Australia) Bill Sidwell | 4–6, 0–6, 1–6 |
| Win | 1950 | U.S. Championships | Grass | (Australia) John Bromwich | (United States) Gardnar Mulloy (United States) Bill Talbert | 7–5, 8–6, 3–6, 6–1 |
| Win | 1951 | Australian Championships | Grass | (Australia) Ken McGregor | (Australia) John Bromwich (Australia) Adrian Quist | 11–9, 2–6, 6–3, 4–6, 6–3 |
| Win | 1951 | French Championships | Clay | (Australia) Ken McGregor | (United States) Gardnar Mulloy (United States) Dick Savitt | 6–2, 2–6, 9–7, 7–5 |
| Win | 1951 | Wimbledon | Grass | (Australia) Ken McGregor | (Egypt) Jaroslav Drobný (South Africa) Eric Sturgess | 3–6, 6–2, 6–3, 3–6, 6–3 |
| Win | 1951 | U.S. Championships | Grass | (Australia) Ken McGregor | (Australia) Don Candy (Australia) Mervyn Rose | 10–8, 6–4, 4–6, 7–5 |
| Win | 1952 | Australian Championships | Grass | (Australia) Ken McGregor | (Australia) Don Candy (Australia) Mervyn Rose | 6–4, 7–5, 6–3 |
| Win | 1952 | French Championships | Clay | (Australia) Ken McGregor | (United States) Gardnar Mulloy (United States) Dick Savitt | 6–3, 6–4, 6–4 |
| Winner | 1952 | Wimbledon | Grass | (Australia) Ken McGregor | (United States) Vic Seixas (South Africa) Eric Sturgess | 6–3, 7–5, 6–4 |
| Loss | 1952 | U.S. Championships | Grass | (Australia) Ken McGregor | (Australia) Mervyn Rose (United States) Vic Seixas | 6–3, 8–10, 8–10, 8–6, 6–8 |

==== Mixed doubles: 11 (8 titles, 3 runner-ups) ====
| Result | Year | Championship | Surface | Partner | Opponents | Score |
|---|---|---|---|---|---|---|
| Loss | 1948 | French Championships | Clay | (United States) Doris Hart | (United States) Patricia Canning Todd (Czechoslovakia) Jaroslav Drobný | 3–6, 6–3, 3–6 |
| Loss | 1948 | Wimbledon | Grass | (United States) Doris Hart | (United States) Louise Brough (Australia) John Bromwich | 2–6, 6–3, 3–6 |
| Win | 1949 | Australian Championships | Grass | (United States) Doris Hart | (Australia) Joyce Fitch (Australia) John Bromwich | 6–1, 5–7, 12–10 |
| Win | 1950 | Australian Championships | Grass | (United States) Doris Hart | (Australia) Joyce Fitch (South Africa) Eric Sturgess | 8–6, 6–4 |
| Loss | 1950 | U.S. Championships | Grass | (United States) Doris Hart | (United States) Margaret Osborne duPont (Australia) Ken McGregor | 4–6, 6–3, 3–6 |
| Win | 1951 | French Championships | Clay | (United States) Doris Hart | (Australia) Thelma Coyne Long (Australia) Mervyn Rose | 7–5, 6–2 |
| Win | 1951 | Wimbledon | Grass | (United States) Doris Hart | (Australia) Nancye Wynne Bolton (Australia) Mervyn Rose | 7–5, 6–2 |
| Win | 1951 | U.S. Championships | Grass | (United States) Doris Hart | (United States) Shirley Fry (Australia) Mervyn Rose | 6–3, 6–2 |
| Win | 1952 | Wimbledon | Grass | (United States) Doris Hart | (Australia) Thelma Coyne Long (Argentina) Enrique Morea | 4–6, 6–3, 6–4 |
| Win | 1952 | French Championships | Clay | (United States) Doris Hart | (United States) Shirley Fry (South Africa) Eric Sturgess | 6–8, 6–3, 6–3 |
| Win | 1952 | U.S. Championships | Grass | (United States) Doris Hart | (Australia) Thelma Coyne Long (Australia) Lew Hoad | 6–3, 7–5 |

=== Pro Slam tournaments ===
==== Singles: 7 (3 titles, 4 runner-ups) ====
| Result | Year | Championship | Opponent | Score |
|---|---|---|---|---|
| Win | 1953 | Wembley Pro | (United States) Pancho Gonzales | 6–1, 6–2, 6–2 |
| Win | 1953 | French Pro Championship | (United States) Pancho Gonzales | |
| Loss | 1954 | US Pro Championship | (United States) Pancho Gonzales | 3–6, 7–9, 6–3, 2–6 |
| Loss | 1956 | Wembley Pro | (United States) Pancho Gonzales | 6–4, 9–11, 9–11, 7–9 |
| Win | 1958 | Wembley Pro | (United States) Tony Trabert | 6–4, 6–3, 6–4 |
| Loss | 1959 | French Pro Championship | (United States) Tony Trabert | 4–6, 4–6, 4–6 |
| Loss | 1961 | US Pro Championship | (United States) Pancho Gonzales | 3–6, 5–7 |

== Singles performance timeline ==
Sedgman joined the professional tennis circuit in 1953 and as a consequence was banned from competing in the amateur Grand Slam events until the start of the Open Era at the 1968 French Open.

Key
| W | F | SF | QF | #R | RR | Q# | DNQ | A | NH |

(W) winner; (F) finalist; (SF) semifinalist; (QF) quarterfinalist; (#R) rounds 4, 3, 2, 1; (RR) round-robin stage; (Q#) qualification round; (DNQ) did not qualify; (A) absent; (NH) not held; (SR) strike rate (events won / competed); (W–L) win–loss record.

| | 1946 | 1947 | 1948 | 1949 | 1950 | 1951 | 1952 | 1953 | 1954 | | 1955 | 1956 | 1957 | 1958 | 1959 | 1960 | 1961 | 1962 | 1963 | 1964 | 1965 | 1966 | 1967 | 1968 | 1969 | 1970 | 1971 | 1972 | 1973 | 1974 | 1975 | 1976 | SR | W–L | Win % |
| Grand Slam tournaments | | | | | | | | | | | | | | | | | | | | | | | | | | | | | | | | | 5 / 31 | 84–26 | 76.4 |
|---|---|---|---|---|---|---|---|---|---|---|---|---|---|---|---|---|---|---|---|---|---|---|---|---|---|---|---|---|---|---|---|---|---|---|---|
| Australian Open | 3R | 1R | QF | W | W | SF | F | not eligible | | | | | | | | | | | | | | | | | A | 2R | 2R | 3R | 1R | 1R | 2R | 2R | 2 / 14 | 25–12 | 67.6 |
| French Open | A | A | 4R | A | 4R | SF | F | not eligible | | | | | | | | | | | | | | | | A | A | A | 1R | A | A | A | A | A | 0 / 5 | 13–5 | 72.2 |
| Wimbledon | A | A | 4R | QF | F | QF | W | not eligible | | | | | | | | | | | | | | | | A | A | A | 3R | A | 1R | A | A | A | 1 / 7 | 26–6 | 81.3 |
| US Open | A | A | 4R | QF | 3R | W | W | not eligible | | | | | | | | | | | | | | | | A | A | A | A | A | A | A | A | A | 2 / 5 | 20–3 | 87.0 |
| Pro Slam tournaments | | | | | | | | | | | | | | | | | | | | | | | | | | | | | | | | | 2 / 19 | 30–17 | 63.8 |
| U.S. Pro | A | A | A | A | A | A | A | A | F | SF | A | A | A | A | A | A | F | A | A | A | 1R | A | A | | | | | | | | | | 0 / 4 | 6–4 | 60.0 |
| French Pro | not held | | | | | | | | | | | SF | NH | SF | F | SF | A | A | SF | QF | QF | A | A | | | | | | | | | | 0 / 7 | 11–7 | 61.1 |
| Wembley Pro | not held | | | A | A | A | A | W | NH | | NH | F | A | W | QF | SF | A | A | 1R | SF | SF | A | A | | | | | | | | | | 2 / 8 | 13–6 | 68.4 |
| Win–loss | 1–1 | 0–1 | 9–4 | 12–2 | 14–3 | 17–3 | 23–2 | 4–0 | 5–2 | | 0–0 | 3–2 | 0–0 | 5–1 | 4–2 | 3–2 | 1–1 | 0–0 | 2–2 | 2–2 | 1–3 | 0–0 | 0–0 | 0–0 | 0–0 | 1–1 | 3–3 | 2–1 | 0–2 | 0–1 | 1–1 | 1–1 | 7 / 50 | 114–43 | 72.6 |

The results of the Pro Tours are not listed here.

== See also ==
- List of male tennis players
- Overall tennis records – Men's singles
- Tennis records of the Open Era – men's singles
