= Don Candy =

Australian tennis player (1929–2020)

- Full name: Donald William Candy
- Country (sports): Australia
- Born: 31 March 1929 Adelaide, Australia
- Died: 14 June 2020 (aged 91)
- Plays: Right-handed

Grand Slam singles results
- Australian Open: QF (1952, 1959)
- French Open: 4R (1956, 1960)
- Wimbledon: 4R (1951, 1957, 1960)
- US Open: 3R (1951)

Grand Slam doubles results
- Australian Open: F (1952, 1953, 1956, 1959)
- French Open: W (1956)
- Wimbledon: QF (1956, 1957)
- US Open: F (1951)

Grand Slam mixed doubles results
- Wimbledon: SF (1952)

Don Candy (31 March 1929 – 14 June 2020) was an Australian tennis player who was mainly successful in doubles.

At the Grand Slam tournaments he reached the quarterfinals of the Australian Championships singles event in 1952 and 1959. In the singles event at the French Championships he reached the eighth-finals in 1956 and 1960.

In June 1951 Candy won the singles title at the Kent Championships, a grass court tournament held in Beckenham, defeating Gardnar Mulloy in three sets. The next year, 1952, he again reached the Kent final but on this occasion lost in three sets to Ham Richardson. In July 1951 he won the Midlands counties men's singles title after a straight sets victory in the final against Naresh Kumar from India.

In 1956 he won the Men's Doubles title at the French Championships. With his American partner Bob Perry he won against compatriots Ashley Cooper and Lew Hoad in three straight sets.

After his active career he moved to Baltimore in 1967 where he coached the World Team Tennis Baltimore Banners and later became the coach of Pam Shriver. In 2022 Shriver disclosed that she had been in a multi-year relationship with Candy, that started when she was a young player.

== Grand Slam finals ==
=== Doubles (1 title, 6 runners-up) ===
Result	Year	Championship	Surface	Partner	Opponents	Score
Loss	1951	US National Championships	Grass	(Australia) Mervyn Rose	(Australia) Ken McGregor (Australia) Frank Sedgman	8–10, 4–6, 6–4, 5–7
Loss	1952	Australian Championships	Grass	(Australia) Mervyn Rose	(Australia) Ken McGregor (Australia) Frank Sedgman	4–6, 5–7, 3–6
Loss	1953	Australian Championships	Grass	(Australia) Mervyn Rose	(Australia) Lew Hoad (Australia) Ken Rosewall	11–9, 4–6, 8–10, 4–6
Loss	1956	Australian Championships	Grass	(Australia) Mervyn Rose	(Australia) Lew Hoad (Australia) Ken Rosewall	8–10, 11–13, 4–6
Winner	1956	French Championships	Clay	(United States) Bob Perry	(Australia) Ashley Cooper (Australia) Lew Hoad	7–5, 6–3, 6–3
Loss	1957	French Championships	Clay	(Australia) Mervyn Rose	(Australia) Mal Anderson (Australia) Ashley Cooper	3–6, 0–6, 3–6
Loss	1959	Australian Championships	Grass	(Australia) Bob Howe	(Australia) Rod Laver (Australia) Robert Mark	7–9, 4–6, 2–6
