= 1956 Wimbledon Championships – Mixed doubles =

Mixed doubles
- 1956 Wimbledon Championships

Final
- Champions: (United States) Vic Seixas (United States) Shirley Fry
- Runners-up: (United States) Gardnar Mulloy (United States) Althea Gibson
- Score: 2–6, 6–2, 7–5

Details
- Draw: 80 (4Q)
- Seeds: 4

Events
Singles	men	women		boys	girls
Doubles	men	women	mixed	boys	girls
- Wimbledon Championships

Vic Seixas and Doris Hart were the defending champions, but Hart did not compete. Seixas competed with Shirley Fry, and they defeated Gardnar Mulloy and Althea Gibson in the final, 2–6, 6–2, 7–5 to win the mixed doubles tennis title at the 1956 Wimbledon Championships.

== Seeds ==
1. (United States) Vic Seixas / (United States) Shirley Fry (champions)
2. (Chile) Luis Ayala / (Australia) Thelma Long (fourth round)
3. (United States) Gardnar Mulloy / (United States) Althea Gibson (final)
4. (Australia) Bob Howe / (United States) Darlene Hard (semifinals)

Click on the seed number of a player to go to their draw section.

== Draw ==
Key

- Q = Qualifier
- WC = Wild card
- LL = Lucky loser
- Alt = Alternate
- ITF = ITF entry
- PR = Protected ranking
- SR = Special ranking
- SE = Special exempt
- JE = Junior exempt
- JR = Junior Accelerator Programme entrant
- CO = College Accelerator Programme entrant
- NG = Next Gen Accelerator Program entrant
- w/o = Walkover
- r = Retired
- d = Defaulted

=== Finals ===
Quarterfinals
1	(United States) Vic Seixas (United States) Shirley Fry
(Egypt) Jaroslav Drobný (United Kingdom) Rita Drobný	w/o
4	(Australia) Bob Howe (United States) Darlene Hard	6	8
(Australia) Neale Fraser (United Kingdom) Pat Ward	4	6
(Australia) Mal Anderson (Australia) Fay Muller	6	1	2
3	(United States) Gardnar Mulloy (United States) Althea Gibson	1	6	6
(United States) Hugh Stewart (West Germany) Erika Vollmer	2	2
(South Africa) Trevor Fancutt (Australia) Daphne Seeney	6	6

Semifinals
1	(United States) Vic Seixas (United States) Shirley Fry	6	7
4	(Australia) Bob Howe (United States) Darlene Hard	3	5
3	(United States) Gardnar Mulloy (United States) Althea Gibson	6	6
(South Africa) Trevor Fancutt (Australia) Daphne Seeney	4	4

Final
1	(United States) Vic Seixas (United States) Shirley Fry	2	6	7
3	(United States) Gardnar Mulloy (United States) Althea Gibson	6	2	5

=== Top half ===
==== Section 1 ====
First round

Second round
1	(United States) Vic Seixas (United States) Shirley Fry	6	6
(Netherlands) Hans van Dalsum (Netherlands) Nel van der Storm	2	2
(United Kingdom) Mike Davies (United Kingdom) Doreen Spiers	6	2	4
(United Kingdom) Don Butler (United Kingdom) Rosemary Bulleid	3	6	6
(Belgium) Gino Mezzi (Belgium) Christiane Mercelis	0	3
(United Kingdom) Geoffrey Paish (United Kingdom) Anne Shilcock	6	6
(United States) Irvin Dorfman (United States) Gloria Butler	2	2
(United States) Bob Perry (Australia) Jennifer Edmondson	6	6

Third round
1	(United States) V Seixas (United States) S Fry	6	6
(United Kingdom) D Butler (United Kingdom) R Bulleid	3	1
(United Kingdom) G Paish (United Kingdom) A Shilcock	6	11
(United States) R Perry (Australia) J Edmondson	2	9

Fourth round
1	(United States) V Seixas (United States) S Fry	3	6	6
(United Kingdom) G Paish (United Kingdom) A Shilcock	6	3	4

==== Section 2 ====
First round

Second round
(Australia) Bob Mark (Denmark) Else Schmith
(South Africa) Abe Segal (Bermuda) Heather Brewer	w/o
(Canada) Don Fontana (South Africa) Sandra Reynolds	w/o
(Cuba) Orlando Garrido (United States) Louise Snow
(Egypt) Jaroslav Drobný (United Kingdom) Rita Drobný	5	6	6
(France) Pierre Darmon (France) Ginette Bucaille	7	4	1
(Australia) Bruce Gulley (United Kingdom) Sue Waters	7	2	6
(United Kingdom) Peter Moys (United Kingdom) Marion Boundy	5	6	1

Third round
(Australia) R Mark (Denmark) E Schmith	3	2
(Cuba) O Garrido (United States) L Snow	6	6
(Egypt) J Drobný (United Kingdom) R Drobný	6	6
(Australia) B Gulley (United Kingdom) S Waters	1	3

Fourth round
(Egypt) J Drobný (United Kingdom) R Drobný	6	6
(Cuba) O Garrido (United States) L Snow	2	2

==== Section 3 ====
First round

Second round
4	(Australia) Bob Howe (United States) Darlene Hard	8	6
(Austria) Freddie Huber (United States) Betty Pratt	6	4
(United Kingdom) Ivor Warwick (United Kingdom) Sheila Armstrong	5	3
(Czechoslovakia) Jiří Parma (Czechoslovakia) Věra Pužejová	7	6
(United States) Sam Giammalva (West Germany) Edda Buding	6	6
(South Africa) RGM Gulney (France) Marie-Odile Bouchet	2	2
(India) Naresh Kumar (Australia) Jenny Hoad	3	7	6
(Australia) Brian Bowman (United Kingdom) Jennifer Middleton	6	5	4

Third round
4	(Australia) R Howe (United States) D Hard	9	8
(Czechoslovakia) J Parma (Czechoslovakia) V Pužejová	7	6
(United States) S Giammalva (West Germany) E Buding	6	8
(India) N Kumar (Australia) J Hoad	2	6

Fourth round
4	(Australia) R Howe (United States) D Hard	6	8
(United States) S Giammalva (West Germany) E Buding	4	6

==== Section 4 ====
First round
Q	(United States) Joe Blatchford (United Kingdom) Diane Midgley	1	6	2
(South Africa) Buster Farrer (South Africa) Estelle van Tonder	6	3	6
(United Kingdom) Colin Hannam (United Kingdom) Georgie Woodgate	6	5	3
(United Kingdom) John Ward (United Kingdom) Leonie Brighton	4	7	6
(Australia) Don Candy (United States) Barbara Davidson	6	6
(Norway) Gunnar Sjøwall (Norway) Astrid Winther	4	2
(United Kingdom) Gerry Oakley (United Kingdom) Pat Hird	6	6
(United Kingdom) Geoff Ward (United Kingdom) Bea Walter	3	0
(Australia) Bruce Francis (Australia) Kay Newcombe	6	4	4
(Australia) Arthur Marshall (United Kingdom) Pauline Roberts	4	6	6
(United Kingdom) Howard Walton (United Kingdom) Gill Evans	2	3
(Australia) Neale Fraser (United Kingdom) Pat Ward	6	6
(Sweden) Staffan Stockenberg (Sweden) Solveig Gustafsson	1	3
(Sweden) Sven Davidson (Australia) Margaret H. O'Donnell	6	6
(Spain) Jaime Bartrolí (Spain) Pilar Barril	4	2
(United Kingdom) Roger Becker (United Kingdom) Marion Craig-Smith	6	6

Second round
(South Africa) W Farrer (South Africa) E van Tonder	6	6
(United Kingdom) J Ward (United Kingdom) L Brighton	4	3
(Australia) D Candy (United States) B Davidson	w/o
(United Kingdom) G Oakley (United Kingdom) P Hird
(Australia) A Marshall (United Kingdom) P Roberts	6	2	3
(Australia) N Fraser (United Kingdom) P Ward	4	6	6
(Sweden) S Davidson (Australia) M O'Donnell	1	7	6
(United Kingdom) R Becker (United Kingdom) M Craig-Smith	6	5	2

Third round
(South Africa) W Farrer (South Africa) E van Tonder	6	2
(United Kingdom) G Oakley (United Kingdom) P Hird	8	6
(Australia) N Fraser (United Kingdom) P Ward	7	7	6
(Sweden) S Davidson (Australia) M O'Donnell	9	5	3

Fourth round
(United Kingdom) G Oakley (United Kingdom) P Hird	6	1	3
(Australia) N Fraser (United Kingdom) P Ward	2	6	6

=== Bottom half ===
==== Section 5 ====
First round
(New Zealand) Peter Becroft (New Zealand) Elaine Becroft	9	6
(Norway) Finn Søhol (France) Colette Monnot	7	4
(United Kingdom) Pat Sherwood (United Kingdom) Gem Hoahing	6	6
(Federation of Rhodesia and Nyasaland) Don Black (France) Françoise Lemal	2	4
(South Africa) Gordon Forbes (South Africa) Jean Forbes	w/o
Q	(United Kingdom) Roy Wilson (United Kingdom) Bobbie Wilson
(Canada) Paul Willey (Australia) PA Thompson
(Belgium) Jacques Peten (Belgium) Poucette Coessens	w/o
(Iran) Matthew Mohtadi (United Kingdom) Barbara Knapp	3	1
(Australia) Rod Laver (Australia) Nell Hopman	6	6
(France) Jean Borotra (France) Suzanne le Besnerais	4	3
(Australia) Mal Anderson (Australia) Fay Muller	6	6
(Netherlands) Boebi van Meegeren (South Africa) Doreen Wedderburn	3	0
(United States) Ronnie Holmberg (United States) Dorothy Knode	6	6
(United Kingdom) Michael Hann (United Kingdom) Evelyn Moeller	9	3	6
(Venezuela) Isaías Pimentel (United Kingdom) Margot Gordon	7	6	3

Second round
(New Zealand) P Becroft (New Zealand) E Becroft	5	6	4
(United Kingdom) P Sherwood (United Kingdom) C Hoahing	7	3	6
Q	(United Kingdom) R Wilson (United Kingdom) B Wilson
(Canada) P Willey (Australia) PA Thompson	w/o
(Australia) R Laver (Australia) E Hopman	5	1
(Australia) M Anderson (Australia) F Muller	7	6
(United States) R Holmberg (United States) D Knode	9	1	6
(United Kingdom) M Hann (United Kingdom) E Moeller	7	6	1

Third round
(United Kingdom) P Sherwood (United Kingdom) C Hoahing	14	4	6
Q	(United Kingdom) R Wilson (United Kingdom) B Wilson	12	6	2
(Australia) M Anderson (Australia) F Muller	6	6
(United States) R Holmberg (United States) D Knode	4	3

Fourth round
(United Kingdom) P Sherwood (United Kingdom) C Hoahing	5	0
(Australia) M Anderson (Australia) F Muller	7	6

==== Section 6 ====
First round

Second round
(Denmark) Søren Højberg (Denmark) Lisa Gram-Andersen	2	6	7
Q	(Lebanon) Samir Khoury (United Kingdom) Sheila Bramley	6	3	5
(France) Jean-Claude Molinari (France) Béatrice de Chambure	6	6
Q	(United Kingdom) Ralph White (United Kingdom) Pauline Drew	2	3
(Australia) Kevin Meyer (United Kingdom) Mary Eyre	8	6
(Netherlands) Fred Dehnert (Netherlands) Joopy Roos-Van der Wal	6	4
(United States) John Fleitz (United States) Beverly Fleitz	2	5
3	(United States) Gardnar Mulloy (United States) Althea Gibson	6	7

Third round
(Denmark) S Højberg (Denmark) L Gram-Andersen	4	1
(France) J-C Molinari (France) B de Chambure	6	6
(Australia) K Meyer (United Kingdom) M Eyre	2	2
3	(United States) G Mulloy (United States) A Gibson	6	6

Fourth round
(France) J-C Molinari (France) B de Chambure	w/o
3	(United States) G Mulloy (United States) A Gibson

==== Section 7 ====
First round

Second round
(United Kingdom) Billy Knight (United Kingdom) Shirley Bloomer
(United States) Bill Talbert (United Kingdom) Angela Buxton	w/o
(United Kingdom) John Barrett (West Germany) Ilse Buding	6	6
(Austria) Hans Redl (Austria) Elizabeth Broz	2	1
(South Africa) Ian Vermaak (South Africa) Thea Hale	6	6
(Spain) Andrés Gimeno (Spain) María Josefa de Riba	3	0
(United States) Hugh Stewart (West Germany) Erika Vollmer	6	6
(United Kingdom) Alan Mills (United Kingdom) Billie Woodgate	4	2

Third round
(United Kingdom) W Knight (United Kingdom) S Bloomer	6	6
(United Kingdom) J Barrett (West Germany) I Buding	2	2
(South Africa) I Vermaak (South Africa) T Hale	7	4	2
(United States) H Stewart (West Germany) E Vollmer	5	6	6

Fourth round
(United Kingdom) W Knight (United Kingdom) S Bloomer	2	4
(United States) H Stewart (West Germany) E Vollmer	6	6

==== Section 8 ====
First round

Second round
(United Kingdom) Tony Pickard (United Kingdom) Elaine Watson	7	6
(Republic of Ireland) Joe Hackett (Republic of Ireland) Mary O'Sullivan	5	4
(South Africa) Trevor Fancutt (Australia) Daphne Seeney	6	6
(Sweden) Ulf Schmidt (Sweden) Birgit Gullbrandsson-Sandén	4	4
(India) Ramanathan Krishnan (United Kingdom) Vera Thomas
(United States) Barry MacKay (tennis) (United States) Jean Clarke	w/o
(United Kingdom) Gerald Smith (United Kingdom) Heather Macfarlane	3	5
2	(Chile) Luis Ayala (Australia) Thelma Long	6	7

Third round
(United Kingdom) A Pickard (United Kingdom) E Watson	2	6
(South Africa) T Fancutt (Australia) D Seeney	6	8
(India) R Krishnan (United Kingdom) V Thomas	0	1
2	(Chile) L Ayala (Australia) T Long	6	6

Fourth round
(South Africa) T Fancutt (Australia) D Seeney	6	8
2	(Chile) L Ayala (Australia) T Long	3	6
