= 1956 Wimbledon Championships – Women's doubles =

Women's doubles
- 1956 Wimbledon Championships

Final
- Champions: (United Kingdom) Angela Buxton (United States) Althea Gibson
- Runners-up: (Australia) Fay Muller (Australia) Daphne Seeney
- Score: 6–1, 8–6

Details
- Draw: 48 (5 Q )
- Seeds: 4

Events
| Singles | men | women | | boys | girls |
| Doubles | men | women | mixed | boys | girls |
| ← 1955 · | Wimbledon Championships | · 1957 → |

Angela Buxton and Althea Gibson defeated Fay Muller and Daphne Seeney in the final, 6–1, 8–6 to win the ladies' doubles tennis title at the 1956 Wimbledon Championships. Gibson became the first African American to win a Wimbledon title; she would go on to win the singles title the next year.

Angela Mortimer and Anne Shilcock were the defending champions, but lost in the semifinals to Muller and Seeney.

== Seeds ==
1. (United States) Louise Brough / (United States) Shirley Fry (semifinals)
2. (United Kingdom) Angela Mortimer / (United Kingdom) Anne Shilcock (semifinals)
3. (United Kingdom) Angela Buxton / (United States) Althea Gibson (champions)
4. (United States) Beverly Fleitz / (United States) Darlene Hard (second round)

Click on the seed number of a player to go to their draw section.

== Draw ==
=== Key ===
- Q = Qualifier
- WC = Wild card
- LL = Lucky loser
- Alt = Alternate
- SE = Special exempt
- PR = Protected ranking
- ITF = ITF entry
- JE = Junior exempt
- w/o = Walkover
- r = Retired
- d = Defaulted
- SR = Special ranking

=== Finals ===
Quarterfinals
2 | (United Kingdom) Angela Mortimer (United Kingdom) Anne Shilcock | 6 | 6
(South Africa) Doreen Wedderburn (United Kingdom) Georgie Woodgate | 2 | 4
(United Kingdom) Doreen Spiers (United Kingdom) Bea Walter | 2 | 4
(Australia) Fay Muller (Australia) Daphne Seeney | 6 | 6
(Australia) Thelma Long (United States) Betty Pratt | 7 | 1 | 1
3 | (United Kingdom) Angela Buxton (United States) Althea Gibson | 5 | 6 | 6
(France) Béatrice de Chambure (France) Colette Monnot | 0 | 1
1 | (United States) Louise Brough (United States) Shirley Fry | 6 | 6

Semifinals
2 | (United Kingdom) Angela Mortimer (United Kingdom) Anne Shilcock | 4 | 2
(Australia) Fay Muller (Australia) Daphne Seeney | 6 | 6
3 | (United Kingdom) Angela Buxton (United States) Althea Gibson | 7 | 6
(United States) Louise Brough (United States) Shirley Fry | 5 | 4

Final
(Australia) Fay Muller (Australia) Daphne Seeney | 1 | 6
3 | (United Kingdom) Angela Buxton (United States) Althea Gibson | 6 | 8

=== Top half ===
==== Section 1 ====
First round

Second round
2 | (United Kingdom) Angela Mortimer (United Kingdom) Anne Shilcock | 7 | 6
(Netherlands) Joopy Roos-Van der Wal (Netherlands) Nel van der Storm | 5 | 2
(United Kingdom) Lesley Fulton (United Kingdom) Mrs FB Webb | 1 | 1
(France) Suzanne le Besnerais (France) Ginette Bucaille | 6 | 6
(India) Rita Davar (United Kingdom) Gem Hoahing | w/o
(New Zealand) Elaine Becroft (United Kingdom) Rosemary Bulleid
(South Africa) Doreen Wedderburn (United Kingdom) Georgie Woodgate | 9 | 4 | 6
(United Kingdom) Sheila Bramley (United Kingdom) Heather Macfarlane | 7 | 6 | 1

Third round
2 | (United Kingdom) A Mortimer (United Kingdom) A Shilcock | 6 | 7
(France) S le Besnerais (France) G Bucaille | 1 | 5
(New Zealand) E Becroft (United Kingdom) R Bulleid | 3 | 6 | 4
(South Africa) D Wedderburn (United Kingdom) G Woodgate | 6 | 3 | 6

Quarterfinals
2 | (United Kingdom) A Mortimer (United Kingdom) A Shilcock | 6 | 6
(South Africa) D Wedderburn (United Kingdom) G Woodgate | 2 | 4

==== Section 2 ====
First round
4 | (United States) Beverly Fleitz (United States) Darlene Hard | 6 | 6
(United Kingdom) Pearl Panton (United Kingdom) Vera Thomas | 0 | 3
(United Kingdom) Carole Levy (Australia) Kay Newcombe | 6 | 3 | 1
(United Kingdom) Doreen Spiers (United Kingdom) Bea Walter | 3 | 6 | 6
(United Kingdom) Joan Curry (United Kingdom) Rita Drobný | 0 | 6 | 3
(United Kingdom) Mary Eyre (United Kingdom) Viola White | 6 | 4 | 6
(United Kingdom) Janet Morgan (United Kingdom) Sheila Speight | 4 | 5
(United Kingdom) Marion Craig-Smith (United Kingdom) Pat Hird | 6 | 7
(West Germany) Edda Buding (West Germany) Ilse Buding
(Sweden) Birgit Gullbrandsson-Sandén (Sweden) Solveig Gustafsson | w/o
(Australia) Fay Muller (Australia) Daphne Seeney | 6 | 6
(Spain) Pilar Barril (Spain) María Josefa de Riba | 1 | 1
(United Kingdom) Denise Collier (United Kingdom) Pauline Roberts | 6 | 3 | 2
(United Kingdom) Jill Rook (United Kingdom) Caroline Yates-Bell | 3 | 6 | 6
(United States) Gloria Butler (United States) Barbara Davidson | w/o
(United States) Jean Clarke (United States) Louise Snow

Second round
4 | (United States) B Fleitz (United States) D Hard | w/o
(United Kingdom) D Spiers (United Kingdom) B Walter
(United Kingdom) M Eyre (United Kingdom) V White | 2 | 7 | 3
(United Kingdom) M Craig-Smith (United Kingdom) P Hird | 6 | 5 | 6
(West Germany) E Buding (West Germany) I Buding | 2 | 4
(Australia) F Muller (Australia) D Seeney | 6 | 6
(United Kingdom) J Rook (United Kingdom) C Yates-Bell | 6 | 6
(United States) J Clarke (United States) L Snow | 4 | 4

Third round
(United Kingdom) D Spiers (United Kingdom) B Walter | 4 | 6 | 6
(United Kingdom) M Craig-Smith (United Kingdom) P Hird | 6 | 4 | 3
(Australia) F Muller (Australia) D Seeney | 6 | 6
(United Kingdom) J Rook (United Kingdom) C Yates-Bell | 1 | 2

Quarterfinals
(United Kingdom) D Spiers (United Kingdom) B Walter | 2 | 4
(Australia) F Muller (Australia) D Seeney | 6 | 6

=== Bottom half ===
==== Section 3 ====
First round
Q | (United Kingdom) Gem Gilbert (United Kingdom) Sue Waters | 2 | 0
(Australia) Thelma Long (United States) Betty Pratt | 6 | 6
(United Kingdom) Sheila Armstrong (United Kingdom) Ann Haydon | 3 | 2
(United Kingdom) Shirley Bloomer (United Kingdom) Pat Ward | 6 | 6
(United Kingdom) Valerie Lewis (United Kingdom) Evelyn Moeller | 6 | 6
Q | (United Kingdom) Pauline Edwards (United Kingdom) Hazel Moorley | 1 | 4
(United Kingdom) SM Colebrooke (United Kingdom) Barbara Knapp | 6 | 7
(United Kingdom) Jennifer Middleton (United Kingdom) Elaine Watson | 3 | 5
(Bermuda) Heather Brewer (Australia) Nell Hopman | 6 | 6
(United Kingdom) Margot Gordon (West Germany) Erika Vollmer | 3 | 4
(Austria) Elizabeth Broz (Australia) Margaret H. O'Donnell | 2 | 2
(United States) Dorothy Knode (Belgium) Christiane Mercelis | 6 | 6
(South Africa) Jean Forbes (South Africa) Thea Hale | w/o
(Australia) Jenny Hoad (Hungary) Zsuzsa Körmöczy
(Czechoslovakia) Věra Pužejová (Norway) Astrid Winther | 1 | 1
3 | (United Kingdom) Angela Buxton (United States) Althea Gibson | 6 | 6

Second round
(Australia) T Long (United States) E Pratt | 8 | 6
(United Kingdom) S Bloomer (United Kingdom) P Ward | 6 | 0
(United Kingdom) V Lewis (United Kingdom) E Moeller | 6 | 6
(United Kingdom) SM Colebrooke (United Kingdom) B Knapp | 3 | 2
(Bermuda) H Brewer (Australia) E Hopman | 6 | 5 | 3
(United States) D Knode (Belgium) C Mercelis | 3 | 7 | 6
(Australia) J Hoad (Hungary) Z Körmöczy | 1 | 1
3 | (United Kingdom) A Buxton (United States) A Gibson | 6 | 6

Third round
(Australia) T Long (United States) E Pratt | 6 | 6
(United Kingdom) V Lewis (United Kingdom) E Moeller | 2 | 4
(United States) D Knode (Belgium) C Mercelis | 3 | 2
3 | (United Kingdom) A Buxton (United States) A Gibson | 6 | 6

Quarterfinals
(Australia) T Long (United States) E Pratt | 7 | 1 | 1
3 | (United Kingdom) A Buxton (United States) A Gibson | 5 | 6 | 6

==== Section 4 ====
First round

Second round
(United Kingdom) Susan Billington (United Kingdom) Margot Parker | 7 | 6
Q | (United Kingdom) Gill Evans (South Africa) Estelle van Tonder | 5 | 2
(France) Béatrice de Chambure (France) Colette Monnot | 6 | 6
(United Kingdom) Rosemary Deloford (United Kingdom) Billie Woodgate | 4 | 2
Q | (South Africa) Sandra Reynolds (South Africa) Sheila Waddington | 6 | 7
Q | (United Kingdom) Lorna White (United Kingdom) Bobbie Wilson | 3 | 5
(Denmark) Lisa Gram-Andersen (Denmark) Else Schmith | 1 | 0
1 | (United States) Louise Brough (United States) Shirley Fry | 6 | 6

Third round
(United Kingdom) S Billington (United Kingdom) M Parker | 2 | 6 | 4
(France) B de Chambure (France) C Monnot | 6 | 3 | 6
(South Africa) S Reynolds (South Africa) S Waddington | 0 | 0
1 | (United States) L Brough (United States) S Fry | 6 | 6

Quarterfinals
(France) Béatrice de Chambure (France) Colette Monnot | 0 | 1
1 | (United States) L Brough (United States) S Fry | 6 | 6
