= 1956 Wimbledon Championships – Men's doubles =

Men's doubles
- 1956 Wimbledon Championships

Final
- Champions: (Australia) Lew Hoad (Australia) Ken Rosewall
- Runners-up: (Italy) Nicola Pietrangeli (Italy) Orlando Sirola
- Score: 7–5, 6–2, 6–1

Details
- Draw: 64 (5Q)
- Seeds: 4

Events
Singles	men	women		boys	girls
Doubles	men	women	mixed	boys	girls
- Wimbledon Championships

Rex Hartwig and Lew Hoad were the defending champions, but Hartwig was ineligible to compete after turning professional. Hoad partnered with Ken Rosewall, and they defeated Nicola Pietrangeli and Orlando Sirola in the final, 7–5, 6–2, 6–1 to win the gentlemen's doubles tennis title at the 1956 Wimbledon Championship.

== Seeds ==
1. (Australia) Lew Hoad / (Australia) Ken Rosewall (champions)
2. (United States) Ham Richardson / (United States) Vic Seixas (quarterfinals)
3. (Australia) Don Candy / (United States) Bob Perry (quarterfinals)
4. (Chile) Luis Ayala / (Sweden) Sven Davidson (quarterfinals)

Click on the seed number of a player to go to their draw section.

== Draw ==
Key

- Q = Qualifier
- WC = Wild card
- LL = Lucky loser
- Alt = Alternate
- ITF = ITF entry
- PR = Protected ranking
- SR = Special ranking
- SE = Special exempt
- JE = Junior exempt
- JR = Junior Accelerator Programme entrant
- CO = College Accelerator Programme entrant
- NG = Next Gen Accelerator Program entrant
- w/o = Walkover
- r = Retired
- d = Defaulted

=== Finals ===
Quarterfinals
1	(Australia) Lew Hoad (Australia) Ken Rosewall	6	6	12
(Australia) Mal Anderson (Australia) Roy Emerson	2	4	10
3	(Australia) Don Candy (United States) Bob Perry	2	3	3
(Australia) Bob Howe (United States) Art Larsen	6	6	6
(Australia) Ashley Cooper (Australia) Neale Fraser	6	3	6	6
4	(Chile) Luis Ayala (Sweden) Sven Davidson	2	6	3	2
(Italy) Nicola Pietrangeli (Italy) Orlando Sirola	6	8	6	6
2	(United States) Ham Richardson (United States) Vic Seixas	3	10	3	4

Semifinals
1	(Australia) Lew Hoad (Australia) Ken Rosewall	4	6	7	6
(Australia) Bob Howe (United States) Art Larsen	6	2	5	3
(Australia) Ashley Cooper (Australia) Neale Fraser	4	4	6
(Italy) Nicola Pietrangeli (Italy) Orlando Sirola	6	6	6

Final
1	(Australia) Lew Hoad (Australia) Ken Rosewall	7	6	6
(Italy) Nicola Pietrangeli (Italy) Orlando Sirola	5	2	1

=== Top half ===
==== Section 1 ====
First round
1	(Australia) Lew Hoad (Australia) Ken Rosewall	6	6	6
(Canada) Lawrence Barclay (Canada) Paul Willey	1	1	2
(Denmark) Kurt Nielsen (Denmark) Torben Ulrich	6	4	6	6
(United States) Gardnar Mulloy (United States) Bud Robineau	4	6	2	2
(Netherlands) Hans van Dalsum (Netherlands) Fred Dehnert	1	2	4
(United States) Ronnie Holmberg (United States) Barry MacKay (tennis)	6	6	6
(United States) Joe Blatchford (United States) John Fleitz	3	2	4
(United States) Sam Giammalva (United States) Gilbert Shea	6	6	6
(France) Pierre Darmon (France) Jean-Claude Molinari	6	4	6	12	9
(Australia) Rod Laver (Australia) Bob Mark	3	6	4	14	7
(Australia) Kevin Meyer (Australia) John O'Brien	1	6	6	4
(Australia) Mal Anderson (Australia) Roy Emerson	6	8	4	6
(Cuba) Reynaldo Garrido (Denmark) Søren Højberg	1	2	3
(United Kingdom) Billy Knight (United Kingdom) Bobby Wilson	6	6	6
(Belgium) Jacques Brichant (Belgium) Gino Mezzi
(United States) Irvin Dorfman (Brazil) Armando Vieira	w/o

Second round
1	(Australia) L Hoad (Australia) K Rosewall	6	6	6
(Denmark) K Nielsen (Denmark) T Ulrich	4	3	2
(United States) R Holmberg (United States) B MacKay	0	6	7	3
(United States) S Giammalva (United States) G Shea	6	3	9	6
(France) P Darmon (France) J-C Molinari	6	1	7
(Australia) M Anderson (Australia) R Emerson	8	6	9
(United Kingdom) W Knight (United Kingdom) R Wilson	9	3	6	3	9
(Belgium) J Brichant (Belgium) G Mezzi	7	6	4	6	7

Third round
1	(Australia) L Hoad (Australia) K Rosewall	6	6	6
(United States) S Giammalva (United States) G Shea	4	2	3
(Australia) M Anderson (Australia) R Emerson	6	7	6
(United Kingdom) W Knight (United Kingdom) R Wilson	2	5	4

Quarterfinals
1	(Australia) L Hoad (Australia) K Rosewall	6	6	12
(Australia) M Anderson (Australia) R Emerson	2	4	10

==== Section 2 ====
First round
3	(Australia) Don Candy (United States) Bob Perry	6	6	6
Q	(Australia) Louis Surville (United States) Hugh Sweeney	3	1	2
(France) Michel Lemasson (Spain) Emilio Martínez
(United States) Pablo Eisenberg (South Africa) Julie Mayer	w/o
(Norway) Gunnar Sjøwall (Norway) Finn Søhol
(Australia) Brian Bowman (Australia) Dick Potter	w/o
(United States) Dean Brinkman (United States) Wayne Van Voorhees	5	3	4
Q	(United Kingdom) Basil Hutchins (United Kingdom) Geoffrey Owen	7	6	6
(United Kingdom) RG Harris (United Kingdom) Jimmy Wilson	4	1	6
(Italy) Umberto Bergamo (Italy) Giorgio Fachini	6	6	8
(Switzerland) René Buser (Dominion of Ceylon) Doug Scharenguivel	3	2	1
(Australia) Bob Howe (United States) Art Larsen	6	6	6
(South Africa) Gordon Forbes (South Africa) Ian Vermaak	6	6	6
(United Kingdom) Eric Filby (United Kingdom) John Horn	3	2	4
LL	(United Kingdom) Eric Bulmer (United Kingdom) John Ward	8	8	4	6
(Republic of Ireland) Ivor Boden (Republic of Ireland) Joe Hackett	6	6	6	3

Second round
3	(Australia) D Candy (United States) R Perry	7	6	6
(France) M Lemasson (Spain) E Martínez	5	1	1
(Norway) G Sjøwall (Norway) F Søhol	7	6	6	5	6
Q	(United Kingdom) B Hutchins (United Kingdom) G Owen	5	3	8	7	3
(Italy) U Bergamo (Italy) G Fachini	2	6	0	3
(Australia) R Howe (United States) A Larsen	6	3	6	6
(South Africa) G Forbes (South Africa) I Vermaak	6	6	6
(United Kingdom) E Bulmer (United Kingdom) J Ward	3	2	3

Third round
3	(Australia) D Candy (United States) R Perry
(Norway) G Sjøwall (Norway) F Søhol	w/o
(Australia) R Howe (United States) A Larsen	6	3	1	6	6
(South Africa) G Forbes (South Africa) I Vermaak	4	6	6	4	4

Quarterfinals
3	(Australia) D Candy (United States) R Perry	2	3	3
(Australia) R Howe (United States) A Larsen	6	6	6

=== Bottom half ===
==== Section 3 ====
First round
(Austria) Freddie Huber (United States) Tony Vincent	6	6	10	6
(United Kingdom) Tony Clayton (Colombia) Gustavo Rueda	3	3	12	2
(Australia) Bruce Francis (Australia) Arthur Marshall	3	3	4
(Australia) Ashley Cooper (Australia) Neale Fraser	6	6	6
Q	(United Kingdom) Keith Collar (United Kingdom) Humphrey Truman	6	6	10
(Federation of Rhodesia and Nyasaland) Don Black (Pakistan) Khwaja Saeed	4	4	8
(France) Bernard Destremau (Netherlands) Boebi van Meegeren	6	8	4	2	6
(United Kingdom) Reg Bennett (United Kingdom) Tim Lewis	1	6	6	6	4
(United Kingdom) John Barrett (United Kingdom) Geoffrey Paish	7	7	6
(Canada) Don Fontana (United Kingdom) Tony Pickard	5	5	4
(Spain) Jaime Bartrolí (Spain) Andrés Gimeno	7	3	3	5
(Czechoslovakia) Jiří Parma (Belgium) Jacques Peten	5	6	6	7
(United Kingdom) Geoff Ward (United Kingdom) Ivor Warwick
(United States) Allen Morris (United States) Bill Talbert	w/o
(Socialist Federal Republic of Yugoslavia) Kamilo Keretić (Socialist Federal Republic of Yugoslavia) Josip Palada	2	1	0
4	(Chile) Luis Ayala (Sweden) Sven Davidson	6	6	6

Second round
(Austria) A Huber (United States) A Vincent	3	2	4
(Australia) A Cooper (Australia) N Fraser	6	6	6
Q	(United Kingdom) K Collar (United Kingdom) H Truman	6	6	7
(France) B Destremau (Netherlands) R van Meegeren	2	4	5
(United Kingdom) J Barrett (United Kingdom) G Paish	4	6	6	6
(Czechoslovakia) J Parma (Belgium) J Peten	6	1	2	3
(United Kingdom) G Ward (United Kingdom) I Warwick	1	1	4
4	(Chile) L Ayala (Sweden) S Davidson	6	6	6

Third round
(Australia) A Cooper (Australia) N Fraser	6	7	9
(United Kingdom) K Collar (United Kingdom) H Truman	4	5	7
(United Kingdom) J Barrett (United Kingdom) G Paish	12	3	4	2
4	(Chile) L Ayala (Sweden) S Davidson	10	6	6	6

Quarterfinals
(Australia) A Cooper (Australia) N Fraser	6	3	6	6
4	(Chile) L Ayala (Sweden) S Davidson	2	6	3	2

==== Section 4 ====
First round
(Sweden) Ulf Schmidt (Sweden) Staffan Stockenberg	6	6	6
(South Africa) Trevor Fancutt (United States) Malcolm Fox	3	4	4
(Egypt) Ibrahim Badreldin-Sayed (Egypt) Kamel Moubarek	4	1	4
Q	(South Africa) Buster Farrer (South Africa) Ivor Phillips	6	6	6
(West Germany) Franz Feldbausch (West Germany) Peter Scholl	6	6	6
Q	(United Kingdom) Rex Hack (Hungary) András Kálmán	4	2	2
(Italy) Nicola Pietrangeli (Italy) Orlando Sirola	6	6	6
(United Kingdom) Henry Billington (United Kingdom) Don Butler	3	2	2
(Chile) Andrés Hammersley (United Kingdom) Gerry Oakley	2	5	4
(India) Ramanathan Krishnan (India) Naresh Kumar	6	7	6
(United Kingdom) Colin Hannam (United Kingdom) Oliver Prenn	2	6	1	2
(South Africa) Abe Segal (United States) Hugh Stewart	6	3	6	6
(Uruguay) Eduardo Argon (Venezuela) Isaías Pimentel	5	7	3
(United Kingdom) Roger Becker (United Kingdom) Mike Davies	7	9	6
(Tunisia) Mustapha Belkhodja (France) Jean Borotra	3	4	4
2	(United States) Ham Richardson (United States) Vic Seixas	6	6	6

Second round
(Sweden) U Schmidt (Sweden) S Stockenberg	6	6	11
Q	(South Africa) W Farrer (South Africa) I Phillips	2	2	9
(West Germany) F Feldbausch (West Germany) P Scholl	4	3	4
(Italy) N Pietrangeli (Italy) O Sirola	6	6	6
(India) R Krishnan (India) N Kumar	4	6	7	6
(South Africa) A Segal (United States) H Stewart	6	3	5	4
(United Kingdom) R Becker (United Kingdom) M Davies	3	2	6
2	(United States) H Richardson (United States) V Seixas	6	6	8

Third round
(Sweden) U Schmidt (Sweden) S Stockenberg	4	3	5
(Italy) N Pietrangeli (Italy) O Sirola	6	6	7
(India) R Krishnan (India) N Kumar	7	3	6	2	4
2	(United States) H Richardson (United States) V Seixas	5	6	2	6	6

Quarterfinals
(Italy) N Pietrangeli (Italy) O Sirola	6	8	6	6
2	(United States) H Richardson (United States) V Seixas	3	10	3	4
