= 1957 Wimbledon Championships – Girls' singles =

Girls' singles
- 1957 Wimbledon Championships

Final
- Champion: (United States) Mimi Arnold
- Runner-up: (Mexico) Rosie Reyes
- Score: 8–6, 6–2

Details
- Draw: 17

Events
Singles	men	women		boys	girls
Doubles	men	women	mixed	boys	girls
← 1956 ·	Wimbledon Championships	· 1958 →

Mimi Arnold defeated Rosie Reyes in the final, 8–6, 6–2 to win the girls' singles tennis title at the 1957 Wimbledon Championships.

== Draw ==
=== Key ===
- Q = Qualifier
- WC = Wild card
- LL = Lucky loser
- Alt = Alternate
- SE = Special exempt
- PR = Protected ranking
- ITF = ITF entry
- JE = Junior exempt
- w/o = Walkover
- r = Retired
- d = Defaulted
- SR = Special ranking

=== Finals ===
Semifinals
(South Africa) Sandra Reynolds	1	4
(United States) Mimi Arnold	6	6
(Mexico) Rosie Reyes	6	6
(Belgium) Marie Marechal	1	3

Final
(United States) Mimi Arnold	8	6
(Mexico) Rosie Reyes	6	2

=== Top half ===
First round
(Czechoslovakia) Jitka Horčičková	3	6	6
(Republic of Ireland) Eleanor O'Neill	6	1	2

Second round
(South Africa) Sandra Reynolds	6	6
(Poland) Krystyna Zmijanka	1	3
(Austria) Sonja Pachta	6	6
(Socialist Federal Republic of Yugoslavia) N Ferić	3	2
(United States) Mimi Arnold	6	6
(France) Pierrette Seghers	1	0
(Netherlands) Fredy Marinkelle	7	3	6
(Czechoslovakia) J Horčičková	5	6	4

Quarterfinals
(South Africa) S Reynolds	6	6
(Austria) S Pachta	4	4
(United States) M Arnold	6	6
(Netherlands) F Marinkelle	2	3

Semifinals
(South Africa) S Reynolds	1	4
(United States) M Arnold	6	6

=== Bottom half ===
First round

Second round
(Norway) Tone Schirmer	6	6
(Denmark) Inge Overgaard	1	3
(Mexico) Rosie Reyes	6	6
(West Germany) Ilse Buding	3	1
(Switzerland) K Frey	4	3
(Argentina) E Ruiz	6	6
(Belgium) Marie Marechal
(United Kingdom) Christine Truman	w/o

Quarterfinals
(Norway) T Schirmer	1	2
(Mexico) R Reyes	6	6
(Argentina) E Ruiz	1	5
(Belgium) M Marechal	6	7

Semifinals
(Mexico) R Reyes	6	6
(Belgium) M Marechal	1	3
