= 1957 Wimbledon Championships – Women's singles =

Women's singles
- 1957 Wimbledon Championships

Final
- Champion: (United States) Althea Gibson
- Runner-up: (United States) Darlene Hard
- Score: 6–3, 6–2

Details
- Draw: 96 (10 Q )
- Seeds: 8

Events
| Singles | men | women | | boys | girls |
| Doubles | men | women | mixed | boys | girls |
| ← 1956 · | Wimbledon Championships | · 1958 → |

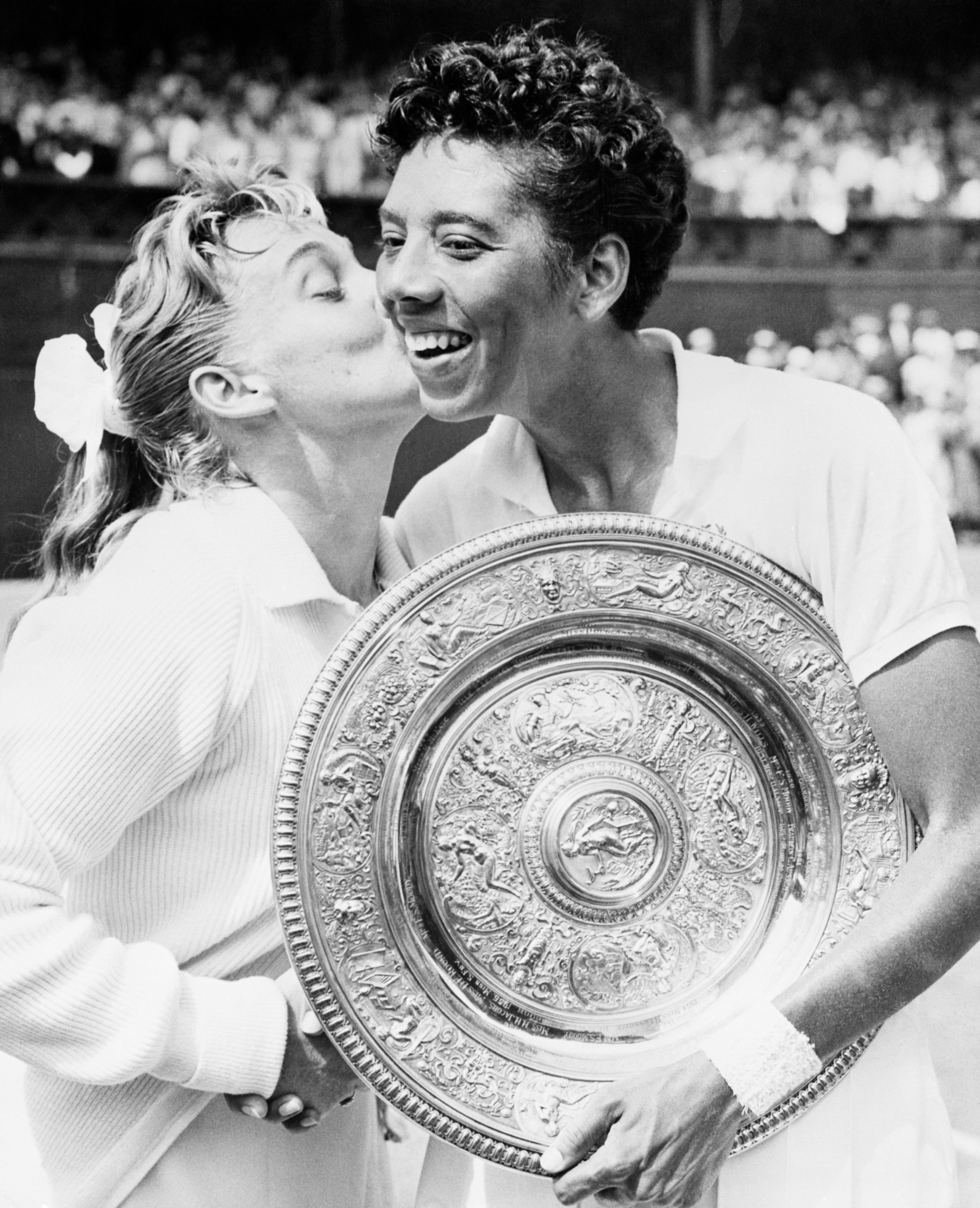
Darlene Hard congratulates Althea Gibson after the final

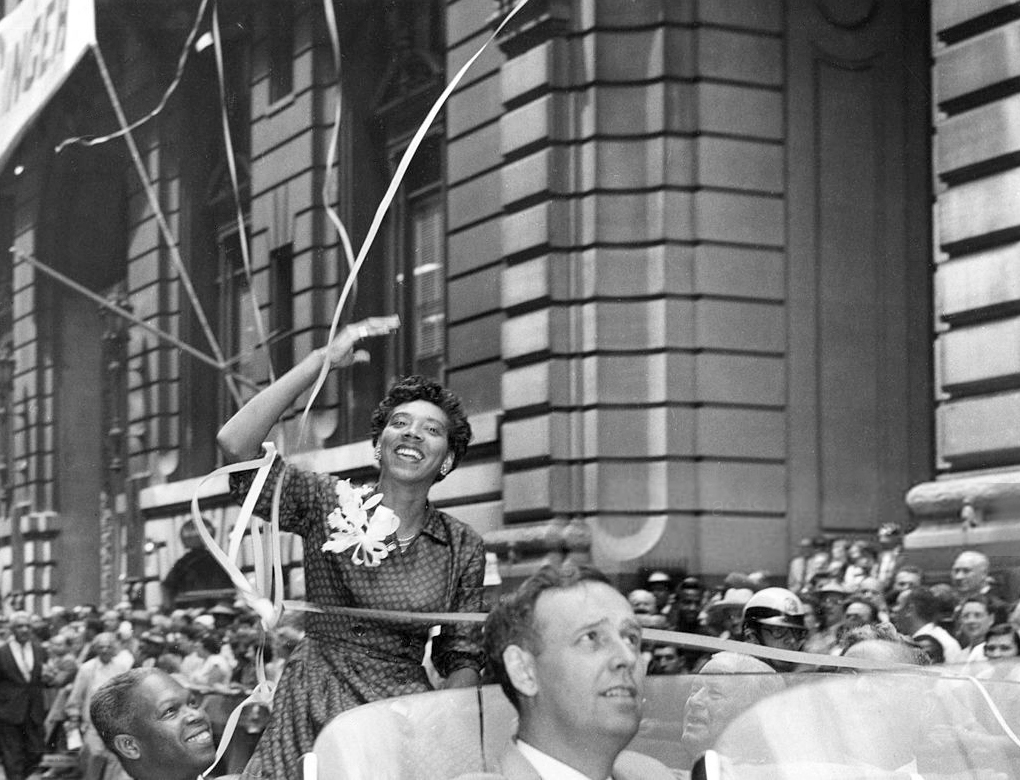
Parade in Gibson's honor in New York City

Althea Gibson defeated Darlene Hard in the final, 6–3, 6–2 to win the ladies' singles tennis title at the 1957 Wimbledon Championships. Gibson was the first African American player to win a Wimbledon singles title. She did not lose a set during the tournament. Shirley Fry was the reigning champion, but did not compete.

== Seeds ==
1. (United States) Althea Gibson (champion)
2. (United States) Louise Brough (quarterfinals)
3. (United Kingdom) Shirley Bloomer (fourth round)
4. (United States) Dorothy Knode (semifinals)
5. (United States) Darlene Hard (final)
6. (Australia) Thelma Long (first round)
7. (United Kingdom) Angela Mortimer (third round)
8. (Czechoslovakia) Věra Pužejová (third round)

Click on the seed number of a player to go to their draw section.

== Draw ==
=== Key ===
- Q = Qualifier
- WC = Wild card
- LL = Lucky loser
- Alt = Alternate
- SE = Special exempt
- PR = Protected ranking
- ITF = ITF entry
- JE = Junior exempt
- w/o = Walkover
- r = Retired
- d = Defaulted
- SR = Special ranking

=== Finals ===
Quarterfinals
2 | (United States) Louise Brough | 2 | 2
5 | (United States) Darlene Hard | 6 | 6
4 | (United States) Dorothy Knode | 6 | 6
(Mexico) Rosie Reyes | 4 | 0
(United States) Betty Pratt | 7 | 7 | 4
(United Kingdom) Christine Truman | 9 | 5 | 6
(South Africa) Sandra Reynolds | 3 | 4
1 | (United States) Althea Gibson | 6 | 6

Semifinals
5 | (United States) Darlene Hard | 6 | 6
4 | (United States) Dorothy Knode | 2 | 3
(United Kingdom) Christine Truman | 1 | 1
1 | (United States) Althea Gibson | 6 | 6

Final
5 | (United States) Darlene Hard | 3 | 2
1 | (United States) Althea Gibson | 6 | 6

=== Top half ===
==== Section 1 ====
First round

Second round
2 | (United States) Louise Brough | 6 | 6
(Australia) Mary Hawton | 2 | 0
(France) Florence de la Courtie | 6 | 6
Q | (United Kingdom) Gill Worrall | 4 | 1
(New Zealand) Heather Robson | 6 | 6
(Austria) Elizabeth Broz | 1 | 2
(Denmark) Milly Vagn-Nielsen | 0 | 0
(Bermuda) Heather Brewer | 6 | 6

Third round
2 | (United States) L Brough | 6 | 6
(France) F de la Courtie | 2 | 0
(New Zealand) H Robson | 1 | 2
(Bermuda) H Brewer | 6 | 6

Fourth round
2 | (United States) L Brough | 7 | 6
(Bermuda) H Brewer | 5 | 1

==== Section 2 ====
First round

Second round
5 | (United States) Darlene Hard | 6 | 6
(United Kingdom) Rita Bentley | 2 | 0
(Brazil) Maria de Amorim | 3 | 6 | 1
(Netherlands) Berna Thung | 6 | 4 | 6
(West Germany) Edda Buding | 6 | 6
Q | (France) Marie-Odile Bouchet | 4 | 1
(United Kingdom) Ann Haydon | 6 | 6
(South Africa) Valerie Forbes | 1 | 3

Third round
5 | (United States) D Hard | 6 | 6
(Netherlands) B Thung | 1 | 1
(West Germany) E Buding | 3 | 6 | 6
(United Kingdom) A Haydon | 6 | 4 | 3

Fourth round
5 | (United States) D Hard | 3 | 7 | 6
(West Germany) E Buding | 6 | 5 | 3

==== Section 3 ====
First round
4 | (United States) Dorothy Knode | 4 | 9 | 6
(Australia) Jenny Hoad | 6 | 7 | 1
(Belgium) Christiane Mercelis | 6 | 6
(United Kingdom) Anthea Warwick | 2 | 0
(France) Susan Chatrier | 6 | 6
(United Kingdom) Barbara Knapp | 2 | 4
Q | (United Kingdom) Joyce Fulton | 3 | 5
(United Kingdom) Pearl Panton | 6 | 7
Q | (United Kingdom) Sheila Bramley | 1 | 7 | 2
(United Kingdom) Phyllis Edwards | 6 | 5 | 6
(Canada) Hanna Sladek | 8 | 8
(United Kingdom) Joan MacLeod | 6 | 6
(United Kingdom) Pat Hird | 6 | 6
(United Kingdom) Pauline Roberts | 1 | 1
Q | (United Kingdom) Barbara Horton | 2 | 1
(United Kingdom) Denise Collier | 6 | 6

Second round
4 | (United States) D Knode | 6 | 5 | 6
(Belgium) C Mercelis | 4 | 7 | 4
(France) S Chatrier | 6 | 6
(United Kingdom) P Panton | 1 | 1
(United Kingdom) P Edwards | 6 | 5 | 6
(Canada) H Sladek | 4 | 7 | 1
(United Kingdom) P Hird | 6 | 6
(United Kingdom) D Collier | 1 | 2

Third round
4 | (United States) D Knode | 6 | 6
(France) S Chatrier | 0 | 2
(United Kingdom) P Edwards | 7 | 3 | 6
(United Kingdom) P Hird | 5 | 6 | 4

Fourth round
4 | (United States) D Knode | 6 | 6
(United Kingdom) P Edwards | 3 | 3

==== Section 4 ====
First round
7 | (United Kingdom) Angela Mortimer | 6 | 6
(United Kingdom) Valerie Clark | 0 | 0
Q | (United Kingdom) Jenny Wagstaff | 3 | 2
(West Germany) Ingeborg Vogler | 6 | 6
(United Kingdom) Pat Wheeler | 6 | 3 | 2
(United States) Karol Fageros | 4 | 6 | 6
(Switzerland) Ruth Kaufmann | 0 | 3
(West Germany) Ilse Buding | 6 | 6
(United Kingdom) Penny Burrell | 0 | 0
(United States) Mimi Arnold | 6 | 6
(United Kingdom) Viola White | 7 | 6
(United Kingdom) Sheila Macintosh | 5 | 4
(South Africa) Renée Schuurman | 6 | 6
(Spain) Mary Terán de Weiss | 4 | 2
(Mexico) Rosie Reyes | 6 | 6
(United Kingdom) Lorna Cawthorn | 3 | 2

Second round
7 | (United Kingdom) A Mortimer | 6 | 6
(West Germany) I Vogler | 1 | 1
(United States) K Fageros | 4 | 6 | 7
(West Germany) I Buding | 6 | 3 | 5
(United States) M Arnold | 6 | 6
(United Kingdom) V White | 4 | 0
(South Africa) R Schuurman | 5 | 1
(Mexico) R Reyes | 7 | 6

Third round
7 | (United Kingdom) A Mortimer | 3 | 6 | 3
(United States) K Fageros | 6 | 4 | 6
(United States) M Arnold | 3 | 3
(Mexico) R Reyes | 6 | 6

Fourth round
(United States) K Fageros | 5 | 4
(Mexico) R Reyes | 7 | 6

=== Bottom half ===
==== Section 5 ====
First round
(United Kingdom) Heather Macfarlane | 0 | 1
(United Kingdom) Hazel Cheadle | 6 | 6
(United Kingdom) Georgie Woodgate | 6 | 7
(United Kingdom) Kathleen Holt | 0 | 5
(New Zealand) Ruia Morrison | 6 | 6
(United Kingdom) Marion Craig-Smith | 3 | 2
(Spain) Pilar Barril | 4 | 3
(United Kingdom) Joan Curry | 6 | 6
(United Kingdom) Sue Waters | 1 | 0
(United States) Betty Pratt | 6 | 6
(United Kingdom) Gill Evans | 5 | 6 | 6
Q | (Kenya) Fran Marshall | 7 | 3 | 3
(United Kingdom) Vera Thomas | 6 | 5 | 7
(United Kingdom) Elaine Shenton | 2 | 7 | 9
(South Africa) Daphne Fancutt | 6 | 9 | 9
6 | (Australia) Thelma Long | 8 | 7 | 7

Second round
(United Kingdom) H Cheadle | 1 | 4
(United Kingdom) G Woodgate | 6 | 6
(New Zealand) R Morrison
(United Kingdom) J Curry | w/o
(United States) E Pratt | 6 | 6
(United Kingdom) G Evans | 3 | 1
(United Kingdom) E Shenton | 4 | 0
(South Africa) D Fancutt | 6 | 6

Third round
(United Kingdom) G Woodgate | 6 | 3 | 1
(New Zealand) R Morrison | 2 | 6 | 6
(United States) E Pratt | 6 | 6
(South Africa) D Fancutt | 4 | 3

Fourth round
(New Zealand) R Morrison | 4 | 9
(United States) E Pratt | 6 | 11

==== Section 6 ====
First round
(United Kingdom) Bea Walter | 6 | 8
Q | (United Kingdom) Pat Ingram | 0 | 6
(United Kingdom) Christine Truman | 6 | 6
(Socialist Federal Republic of Yugoslavia) Marica Cranadak-Milonja | 1 | 1
Q | (United Kingdom) Sonia Cox | 6 | 7 | 10
(Switzerland) Heidi Enzen | 1 | 9 | 8
(United Kingdom) Hazel Moorley | 6 | 4 | 6
(Netherlands) Nel van der Storm | 3 | 6 | 1
(United Kingdom) Jill Rook | 6 | 6
(United Kingdom) Julie Lintern | 4 | 4
(Republic of Ireland) June Fitzpatrick | 2 | 4
(France) Suzanne le Besnerais | 6 | 6
(United Kingdom) Billie Woodgate | 2 | 6 | 6
(Belgium) Poucette Bernheim | 6 | 2 | 0
(United Kingdom) Pat Ward | 1 | 3
3 | (United Kingdom) Shirley Bloomer | 6 | 6

Second round
(United Kingdom) B Walter | 3 | 2
(United Kingdom) C Truman | 6 | 6
Q | (United Kingdom) S Cox | 7 | 3 | 6
(Netherlands) N van der Storm | 5 | 6 | 2
(United Kingdom) J Rook | 6 | 4 | 6
(France) S le Besnerais | 4 | 6 | 0
(United Kingdom) R Woodgate | 0 | 1
3 | (United Kingdom) S Bloomer | 6 | 6

Third round
(United Kingdom) C Truman | 6 | 6
Q | (United Kingdom) S Cox | 1 | 1
(United Kingdom) J Rook | 1 | 2
3 | (United Kingdom) S Bloomer | 6 | 6

Fourth round
(United Kingdom) C Truman | 6 | 6
3 | (United Kingdom) S Bloomer | 3 | 3

==== Section 7 ====
First round

Second round
(West Germany) Erika Vollmer | 6 | 6
Q | (United Kingdom) Meriel Morgan | 1 | 0
(South Africa) Sandra Reynolds | 4 | 9 | 6
(United Kingdom) Anne Shilcock | 6 | 7 | 4
(United Kingdom) Sheila Armstrong | 10 | 3 | 6
(United Kingdom) Rosemary Deloford | 8 | 6 | 2
(France) Ginette Bucaille | 1 | 3
8 | (Czechoslovakia) Věra Pužejová | 6 | 6

Third round
(West Germany) E Vollmer | 5 | 6 | 11
(South Africa) S Reynolds | 7 | 3 | 13
(United Kingdom) S Armstrong | 6 | 1 | 6
8 | (Czechoslovakia) V Pužejová | 4 | 6 | 1

Fourth round
(South Africa) S Reynolds | 6 | 8
(United Kingdom) S Armstrong | 3 | 6

==== Section 8 ====
First round

Second round
(Mexico) Yola Ramírez | 7 | 6 | 6
(United Kingdom) Gem Hoahing | 9 | 3 | 8
(United Kingdom) Jean Knight | 9 | 4 | 6
(Australia) Kay Newcombe | 7 | 6 | 2
(Australia) Margaret Hellyer | 6 | 6
(Spain) María Josefa de Riba | 1 | 0
(Hungary) Zsuzsa Körmöczy | 4 | 4
1 | (United States) Althea Gibson | 6 | 6

Third round
(United Kingdom) C Hoahing | 6 | 6
(United Kingdom) J Knight | 3 | 1
(Australia) M Hellyer | 4 | 2
1 | (United States) A Gibson | 6 | 6

Fourth round
(United Kingdom) C Hoahing | 1 | 1
1 | (United States) A Gibson | 6 | 6

| Preceded by 1958 French Championships – Women's singles | Grand Slam women's singles | Succeeded by 1958 U.S. National Championships – Women's singles |
