= 1956 Wimbledon Championships – Men's singles =

Men's singles
- 1956 Wimbledon Championships

Final
- Champion: (Australia) Lew Hoad
- Runner-up: (Australia) Ken Rosewall
- Score: 6–2, 4–6, 7–5, 6–4

Details
- Draw: 128 (10Q)
- Seeds: 8

Events
Singles	men	women		boys	girls
Doubles	men	women	mixed	boys	girls
- Wimbledon Championships

In the 1956 Wimbledon Championships men's singles, Lew Hoad defeated Ken Rosewall in the final, 6–2, 4–6, 7–5, 6–4, to win the gentlemen's singles tennis title. It was the first of three years in which Australian players dominated the Wimbledon Men's Singles final. Tony Trabert was the defending champion, but was ineligible to compete after turning professional. The competition lasted from Monday 25 June to Saturday 7 July 1956.

Ulf Schmidt, from Sweden, was the only player from outside Australia and the United States to reach the quarterfinal stage.

It was the first Wimbledon tournament in which Australian Rod Laver competed in senior competition; 17-year-old Laver, a qualifier, was defeated in the first round by Orlando Sirola.

== Seeds ==
1. (Australia) Lew Hoad (champion)
2. (Australia) Ken Rosewall (final)
3. (Sweden) Sven Davidson (second round)
4. (United States) Budge Patty (second round)
5. (Egypt) Jaroslav Drobný (first round)
6. (United States) Ham Richardson (semifinals)
7. (Denmark) Kurt Nielsen (third round)
8. (United States) Vic Seixas (semifinals)

Click on the seed number of a player to go to their draw section.

== Draw ==
Key

- Q = Qualifier
- WC = Wild card
- LL = Lucky loser
- Alt = Alternate
- ITF = ITF entry
- PR = Protected ranking
- SR = Special ranking
- SE = Special exempt
- JE = Junior exempt
- JR = Junior Accelerator Programme entrant
- CO = College Accelerator Programme entrant
- NG = Next Gen Accelerator Program entrant
- w/o = Walkover
- r = Retired
- d = Defaulted

=== Finals ===
Quarterfinals
1	(Australia) Lew Hoad	4	6	6	13
(Australia) Mal Anderson	6	1	1	11
(Australia) Neale Fraser	3	11	5	4
6	(United States) Ham Richardson	6	9	7	6
8	(United States) Vic Seixas	13	6	6
(United States) Allen Morris	11	0	3
(Sweden) Ulf Schmidt	1	3	2
2	(Australia) Ken Rosewall	6	6	6

Semifinals
1	(Australia) Lew Hoad	3	6	6	6
6	(United States) Ham Richardson	6	4	2	4
8	(United States) Vic Seixas	3	6	8	3	5
2	(Australia) Ken Rosewall	6	3	6	6	7

Final
1	(Australia) Lew Hoad	6	4	7	6
2	(Australia) Ken Rosewall	2	6	5	4

=== Top half ===
==== Section 1 ====
First round
1	(Australia) Lew Hoad	9	6	6
(Canada) Don Fontana	7	2	0
Q	(United Kingdom) Peter Wooller	3	3	2
(South Africa) Trevor Fancutt	6	6	6
(United States) Dean Brinkman	3	6	9	3
Q	(United Kingdom) Dennis Hughes	6	4	11	6
(Spain) Emilio Martínez	3	6	6	4	3
(United States) John Fleitz	6	1	2	6	6
(United States) Gilbert Shea	6	6	8
(Cuba) Orlando Garrido	4	4	6
(Denmark) Søren Højberg	3	4	4
(United States) Bob Perry	6	6	6
(United States) Pablo Eisenberg	6	6	6
(Socialist Federal Republic of Yugoslavia) Josip Palada	2	4	2
(Australia) John O'Brien	6	6	6
(United Kingdom) Billy Knight	4	2	2

Second round
1	(Australia) L Hoad	9	6	7
(South Africa) T Fancutt	7	3	5
Q	(United Kingdom) D Hughes	2	4	4
(United States) J Fleitz	6	6	6
(United States) G Shea	4	5	4
(United States) R Perry	6	7	6
(United States) P Eisenberg	0	1	4
(Australia) J O'Brien	6	6	6

Third round
1	(Australia) L Hoad	6	6	6
(United States) J Fleitz	3	2	0
(United States) R Perry	2	8	6	6	4
(Australia) J O'Brien	6	6	8	2	6

Fourth round
1	(Australia) L Hoad	6	6	6
(Australia) J O'Brien	4	1	4

==== Section 2 ====
First round
5	(Egypt) Jaroslav Drobný	1	6	1	4
(India) Ramanathan Krishnan	6	4	6	6
(Australia) Don Candy	12	6	6
(France) Pierre Darmon	10	2	2
(Australia) Mal Anderson	6	6	6
(Belgium) Gino Mezzi	1	2	4
(Norway) Gunnar Sjøwall	7	6	6
(Pakistan) Khwaja Saeed	5	3	1
(Italy) Nicola Pietrangeli	6	6	7
(Australia) Brian Bowman	2	4	5
(United Kingdom) Geoffrey Paish	4	3	6	6	1
(Venezuela) Isaías Pimentel	6	6	3	4	6
(Australia) Dick Potter	4	1	4
(South Africa) Buster Farrer	6	6	6
(Netherlands) Fred Dehnert	6	4	2	6	4
(Sweden) Staffan Stockenberg	1	6	6	4	6

Second round
(India) R Krishnan	1	7	2	6	6
(Australia) D Candy	6	5	6	3	3
(Australia) M Anderson	6	6	7
(Norway) G Sjøwall	1	1	5
(Italy) N Pietrangeli	7	6	6
(Venezuela) I Pimentel	5	3	3
(South Africa) W Farrer	4	2	10
(Sweden) S Stockenberg	6	6	12

Third round
(India) R Krishnan	4	4	1
(Australia) M Anderson	6	6	6
(Italy) N Pietrangeli	9	6	6
(Sweden) S Stockenberg	7	4	4

Fourth round
(Australia) M Anderson	9	3	6	4	6
(Italy) N Pietrangeli	7	6	3	6	2

==== Section 3 ====
First round
4	(United States) Budge Patty	6	6	9
(Austria) Freddie Huber	2	4	7
(United Kingdom) Bobby Wilson	6	6	6
(Canada) Paul Willey	4	1	1
(United States) Gardnar Mulloy	11	4	1
(Australia) Neale Fraser	13	6	6
(Chile) Andrés Hammersley	6	3	4	6	5
Q	(United States) Joe Blatchford	2	6	6	3	7
(Australia) Roy Emerson	6	6	6
Q	(South Africa) Brian Page	1	1	2
(United Kingdom) Tony Pickard	6	6	6
LL	(United Kingdom) Derek Collins	3	2	2
(Australia) Bob Howe	6	6	6
(France) Robert Abdesselam	1	4	4
LL	(United Kingdom) Eddie Ford	5	7	0	8	2
(West Germany) Franz Feldbausch	7	5	6	6	6

Second round
4	(United States) J Patty	10	6	3	4
(United Kingdom) R Wilson	12	2	6	6
(Australia) N Fraser	6	6	6
Q	(United States) J Blatchford	1	1	4
(Australia) R Emerson	6	6	3	6
(United Kingdom) A Pickard	1	4	6	3
(Australia) R Howe	6	6	6
(West Germany) F Feldbausch	4	2	3

Third round
(United Kingdom) R Wilson	6	5	3
(Australia) N Fraser	8	7	6
(Australia) R Emerson	2	6	1	4
(Australia) R Howe	6	2	6	6

Fourth round
(Australia) N Fraser	6	6	7
(Australia) R Howe	2	4	5

==== Section 4 ====
First round
6	(United States) Ham Richardson	6	9	11	8
(Australia) Jack Arkinstall	4	7	13	6
LL	(United Kingdom) Derrick Lester	1	3	1
Q	(United Kingdom) Gordon Mudge	6	6	6
(United States) Barry MacKay	6	6	6
(United Kingdom) Geoff Cass	1	2	4
(Socialist Federal Republic of Yugoslavia) Vladimir Petrović	1	2	2
(Denmark) Torben Ulrich	6	6	6
(Czechoslovakia) Jiří Parma	4	5	2
(United Kingdom) Alan Mills	6	7	6
(France) Bernard Destremau	3	1	0
(South Africa) Abe Segal	6	6	6
(Australia) Arthur Marshall	6	6	6
(Egypt) Kamel Moubarek	0	1	1
LL	(Pakistan) Munir Pirzada	6	6	8
Q	(United Kingdom) Ralph White	3	1	6

Second round
6	(United States) H Richardson	6	6	6
Q	(United Kingdom) G Mudge	1	1	0
(United States) B MacKay	5	4	2
(Denmark) T Ulrich	7	6	6
(United Kingdom) A Mills	3	2	3
(South Africa) A Segal	6	6	6
(Australia) A Marshall	6	6	6
LL	(Pakistan) M Pirzada	0	2	3

Third round
6	(United States) H Richardson	6	10	6
(Denmark) T Ulrich	4	8	3
(South Africa) A Segal	6	6	22
(Australia) A Marshall	0	2	20

Fourth round
6	(United States) H Richardson	7	0
(South Africa) A Segal	5	0^{r}

=== Bottom half ===
==== Section 5 ====
First round
(Socialist Federal Republic of Yugoslavia) Ilija Panajotović	4	2	6	1
(United Kingdom) Ivor Warwick	6	6	4	6
(Austria) Hans Redl	2	3	1
(United Kingdom) John Horn	6	6	6
(Uruguay) Eduardo Argon	3	3	2
(United States) Sam Giammalva	6	6	6
(South Africa) Gordon Forbes	6	6	6
(United States) Wayne Van Voorhees	1	1	4
(United States) Tony Vincent	6	6	1	4	6
(West Germany) Peter Scholl	3	3	6	6	3
(United States) Irvin Dorfman	4	4	3
(United States) Herbie Flam	6	6	6
(France) Jean-Claude Molinari	6	6	6
(United Kingdom) Howard Walton	4	4	1
(United States) Malcolm Fox	1	2	3
8	(United States) Vic Seixas	6	6	6

Second round
(United Kingdom) I Warwick	10	6	6
(United Kingdom) J Horn	8	2	1
(United States) S Giammalva	1	7	4
(South Africa) G Forbes	6	9	6
(United States) A Vincent	3	7	3	1
(United States) H Flam	6	5	6	6
(France) J-C Molinari	5	3	2
8	(United States) V Seixas	7	6	6

Third round
(United Kingdom) I Warwick	0	2	1
(South Africa) G Forbes	6	6	6
(United States) H Flam	6	1	1	8
8	(United States) V Seixas	4	6	6	10

Fourth round
(South Africa) G Forbes	2	1	6
8	(United States) V Seixas	6	6	8

==== Section 6 ====
First round
(United Kingdom) Michael Hann	3	6	6	6
LL	(South Africa) Roche Goosen	6	3	4	2
(United Kingdom) Robin Kipping	4	1	8	6	6
Q	(Socialist Federal Republic of Yugoslavia) Kamilo Keretić	6	6	6	4	4
(Australia) Bruce Gulley	6	1	6	7
(United Kingdom) Reg Bennett	4	6	0	5
(United States) Allen Morris	7	6	5	6
(United Kingdom) Eric Bulmer	5	3	7	4
(United Kingdom) Peter Moys	5	6	7	2
(United Kingdom) Oliver Prenn	7	8	5	6
(Federation of Rhodesia and Nyasaland) Don Black	6	3	6	10
(United Kingdom) Gerry Oakley	2	6	4	8
(Australia) Ashley Cooper	4	6	2	6	6
(United Kingdom) Mike Davies	6	4	6	4	3
(United Kingdom) Geoffrey Owen	5	1	3
3	(Sweden) Sven Davidson	7	6	6

Second round
(United Kingdom) M Hann	5	5	4
(United Kingdom) R Kipping	7	7	6
(Australia) B Gulley	2	3	3
(United States) A Morris	6	6	6
(United Kingdom) O Prenn	6	4	0	9	1
(Federation of Rhodesia and Nyasaland) D Black	4	6	6	7	6
(Australia) A Cooper	6	2	6	1	6
3	(Sweden) S Davidson	3	6	3	6	4

Third round
(United Kingdom) R Kipping	4	5	7
(United States) A Morris	6	7	9
(Federation of Rhodesia and Nyasaland) D Black	2	6	1	6	7
(Australia) A Cooper	6	4	6	4	9

Fourth round
(United States) A Morris	1	12	8	3	6
(Australia) A Cooper	6	10	6	6	3

==== Section 7 ====
First round
(Norway) Finn Søhol	0	4	1
(Spain) Andrés Gimeno	6	6	6
(Australia) Graham Regan	6	6	1	8
(Netherlands) Hans van Dalsum	3	3	6	6
(South Africa) Julie Mayer	1	2	5
(South Africa) Ian Vermaak	6	6	7
(United States) Hugh Sweeney	0	3	3
(Sweden) Ulf Schmidt	6	6	6
(Egypt) Ibrahim Badreldin-Sayed	1	3	4
(Chile) Luis Ayala	6	6	6
(Republic of Ireland) Joe Hackett	4	1	3
(United Kingdom) Roger Becker	6	6	6
(United Kingdom) Tony Clayton	4	3	10
Q	(India) Akhtar Ali	6	6	12
Q	(Australia) Bob Mark	0	2	3
7	(Denmark) Kurt Nielsen	6	6	6

Second round
(Spain) A Gimeno	6	6	6
(Australia) G Regan	2	2	1
(South Africa) I Vermaak	6	4	6	7	3
(Sweden) U Schmidt	8	6	1	5	6
(Chile) L Ayala	1	4	12	6	6
(United Kingdom) R Becker	6	6	10	2	3
Q	(India) A Ali	1	10	2	1
7	(Denmark) K Nielsen	6	8	6	6

Third round
(Spain) A Gimeno	6	3	1	4
(Sweden) U Schmidt	4	6	6	6
(Chile) L Ayala	5	6	6	5	6
7	(Denmark) K Nielsen	7	4	4	7	4

Fourth round
(Sweden) U Schmidt	7	5	6	6
(Chile) L Ayala	5	7	4	2

==== Section 8 ====
First round
(Australia) Kevin Meyer	3	3	4
(United States) Hugh Stewart	6	6	6
(United States) Ronnie Holmberg	7	3	4	3
(United States) Art Larsen	5	6	6	6
(Canada) Lawrence Barclay	6	7	1	6
(Tunisia) Mustapha Belkhodja	1	5	6	3
(Belgium) Jacques Brichant	6	6	6
(United Kingdom) John Ward	4	2	2
(Italy) Orlando Sirola	7	6	6
Q	(Australia) Rod Laver	5	4	2
(Brazil) Armando Vieira	w/o
(India) Naresh Kumar
(United Kingdom) Clive Bernstein	3	6	3	2
(United Kingdom) Geoff Ward	6	2	6	6
(United Kingdom) John Barrett	2	1	6	1
2	(Australia) Ken Rosewall	6	6	2	6

Second round
(United States) H Stewart	3	2	0
(United States) A Larsen	6	6	6
(Canada) L Barclay	4	7	5
(Belgium) J Brichant	6	9	7
(Italy) O Sirola	2	7	6	4	8
(India) N Kumar	6	5	2	6	6
(United Kingdom) G Ward	2	1	3
2	(Australia) K Rosewall	6	6	6

Third round
(United States) A Larsen	6	6	6
(Belgium) J Brichant	3	3	1
(Italy) O Sirola	5	4	7
2	(Australia) K Rosewall	7	6	9

Fourth round
(United States) A Larsen	5	5	3
2	(Australia) K Rosewall	7	7	6

Preceded by 1956 French Championships	Grand Slams; Men's Singles	Succeeded by 1956 U.S. Championships
