= 1957 Wimbledon Championships – Men's doubles =

Men's doubles
- 1957 Wimbledon Championships

Final
- Champions: (United States) Gardnar Mulloy (United States) Budge Patty
- Runners-up: (Australia) Neale Fraser (Australia) Lew Hoad
- Score: 8–10, 8–6, 6–4, 6–4

Details
- Draw: 64 (5Q)
- Seeds: 4

Events
Singles	men	women		boys	girls
Doubles	men	women	mixed	boys	girls
- Wimbledon Championships

Lew Hoad and Ken Rosewall were the defending champions, but Rosewall was ineligible to compete after turning professional.

Gardnar Mulloy and Budge Patty defeated Hoad and Neale Fraser in the final, 8–10, 8–6, 6–4, 6–4 to win the gentlemen's doubles tennis title at the 1957 Wimbledon Championship.

== Seeds ==
1. (Australia) Neale Fraser / (Australia) Lew Hoad (final)
2. (United States) Ham Richardson / (United States) Vic Seixas (third round)
3. (Australia) Mal Anderson / (Australia) Ashley Cooper (quarterfinals)
4. (Italy) Nicola Pietrangeli / (Italy) Orlando Sirola (semifinals)

Click on the seed number of a player to go to their draw section.

== Draw ==
Key

- Q = Qualifier
- WC = Wild card
- LL = Lucky loser
- Alt = Alternate
- ITF = ITF entry
- PR = Protected ranking
- SR = Special ranking
- SE = Special exempt
- JE = Junior exempt
- JR = Junior Accelerator Programme entrant
- CO = College Accelerator Programme entrant
- NG = Next Gen Accelerator Program entrant
- w/o = Walkover
- r = Retired
- d = Defaulted

=== Finals ===
Quarterfinals
1	(Australia) Neale Fraser (Australia) Lew Hoad	6	6	10
(United States) Mike Franks (United States) Mike Green	1	3	8
4	(Italy) Nicola Pietrangeli (Italy) Orlando Sirola	6	9	6
(Australia) Roy Emerson (Australia) Bob Mark	3	7	4
(United States) Gardnar Mulloy (United States) Budge Patty	6	6	6
3	(Australia) Mal Anderson (Australia) Ashley Cooper	3	3	0
(Australia) Don Candy (Australia) Mervyn Rose	4	6	5	6	5
(United Kingdom) Roger Becker (Australia) Bob Howe	6	3	7	3	7

Semifinals
1	(Australia) Neale Fraser (Australia) Lew Hoad	14	1	8	6
4	(Italy) Nicola Pietrangeli (Italy) Orlando Sirola	12	6	6	3
(United States) Gardnar Mulloy (United States) Budge Patty	9	7	6
(United Kingdom) Roger Becker (Australia) Bob Howe	7	5	3

Final
1	(Australia) Neale Fraser (Australia) Lew Hoad	10	6	4	4
(United States) Gardnar Mulloy (United States) Budge Patty	8	8	6	6

=== Top half ===
==== Section 1 ====
First round
1	(Australia) Neale Fraser (Australia) Lew Hoad	6	6	6
(Socialist Federal Republic of Yugoslavia) Ilija Panajotović (Socialist Federal Republic of Yugoslavia) Ivko Plećević	2	2	2
Q	(United States) Glenn Bassett (United States) Bob Sherman	3	7	6	3
(Austria) Freddie Huber (Austria) Franz Saiko	6	9	3	6
(United Kingdom) Billy Knight (United Kingdom) Tony Pickard	6	6	4	6
(Cuba) Orlando Garrido (Venezuela) Isaías Pimentel	3	2	6	3
(United Kingdom) Reg Bennett (United Kingdom) Mike Hann	9	7	1	2	6
(Spain) Andrés Gimeno (Spain) Emilio Martínez	7	5	6	6	4
(Belgium) Jacques Brichant (Belgium) Philippe Washer	6	6	6
(France) Jean-Claude Molinari (France) Paul Rémy	3	2	4
(Mexico) Francisco Contreras (Mexico) Mario Llamas	3	6	2	6	6
(United Kingdom) Mike Davies (United Kingdom) Bobby Wilson	6	4	6	3	8
(India) Ramanathan Krishnan (India) Naresh Kumar	8	6	6
(Colombia) William Álvarez (Czechoslovakia) Jiří Javorský	6	1	2
Q	(South Africa) Tony Charnock (United Kingdom) Ian King	2	2	1
(United States) Mike Franks (United States) Mike Green	6	6	6

Second round
1	(Australia) N Fraser (Australia) L Hoad	6	6	7
(Austria) A Huber (Austria) F Saiko	0	1	5
(United Kingdom) W Knight (United Kingdom) A Pickard	6	6	14
(United Kingdom) R Bennett (United Kingdom) M Hann	2	3	12
(Belgium) J Brichant (Belgium) P Washer	4	0	3
(United Kingdom) M Davies (United Kingdom) R Wilson	6	6	6
(India) R Krishnan (India) N Kumar	6	5	3	4
(United States) M Franks (United States) M Green	4	7	6	6

Third round
1	(Australia) N Fraser (Australia) L Hoad	8	6	6
(United Kingdom) W Knight (United Kingdom) A Pickard	6	4	3
(United Kingdom) M Davies (United Kingdom) R Wilson	12	6	6	8
(United States) M Franks (United States) M Green	14	4	8	10

Quarterfinals
1	(Australia) N Fraser (Australia) L Hoad	6	6	10
(United States) M Franks (United States) M Green	1	3	8

==== Section 2 ====
First round
4	(Italy) Nicola Pietrangeli (Italy) Orlando Sirola	6	6	6	3	6
(Uruguay) Eduardo Argon (Cuba) Reynaldo Garrido	4	4	8	6	1
(Netherlands) Hans van Dalsum (Netherlands) Fred Dehnert	2	3	3
(United States) Herbie Flam (South Africa) Abe Segal	6	6	6
(Japan) Kosei Kamo (United States) Sidney Schwartz	6	3	6	9
(Brazil) Carlos Fernandes (Brazil) Ivo Ribeiro	3	6	4	7
(United Kingdom) Keith Collar (United Kingdom) Humphrey Truman	6	6	6
(Finland) Reino Nyyssönen (Belgium) Jacques Peten	3	4	4
(South Africa) Trevor Fancutt (South Africa) Gordon Forbes	6	7	7
(United Kingdom) Basil Hutchins (United Kingdom) Geoffrey Owen	2	5	5
Q	(United Kingdom) Tommy Anderson (United Kingdom) Howard Walton	4	6	7	1
(Australia) Roy Emerson (Australia) Bob Mark	6	8	5	6
(Sweden) Bo Andersson (Sweden) Staffan Stockenberg	6	5	8	3	1
Q	(United Kingdom) Peter Moys (United Kingdom) John Ward	1	7	6	6	6
(Denmark) Søren Højberg (Denmark) Jørgen Ulrich	4	4	4
(Australia) Neil Gibson (Australia) Warren Woodcock	6	6	6

Second round
4	(Italy) N Pietrangeli (Italy) O Sirola	6	4	1	6	6
(United States) H Flam (South Africa) A Segal	3	6	6	4	4
(Japan) K Kamo (United States) S Schwartz	6	6	6
(United Kingdom) K Collar (United Kingdom) H Truman	3	4	2
(South Africa) T Fancutt (South Africa) G Forbes	11	2	6	4	2
(Australia) R Emerson (Australia) R Mark	9	6	2	6	6
Q	(United Kingdom) P Moys (United Kingdom) J Ward	8	7	6	5
(Australia) N Gibson (Australia) W Woodcock	10	9	4	7

Third round
4	(Italy) N Pietrangeli (Italy) O Sirola	7	6	6
(Japan) K Kamo (United States) S Schwartz	5	3	2
(Australia) R Emerson (Australia) R Mark	6	6	6
(Australia) N Gibson (Australia) W Woodcock	1	2	4

Quarterfinals
4	(Italy) N Pietrangeli (Italy) O Sirola	6	9	6
(Australia) R Emerson (Australia) R Mark	3	7	4

=== Bottom half ===
==== Section 3 ====
First round
(United States) Alex Olmedo (United States) Hugh Stewart	4	4	10	4
(United States) Gardnar Mulloy (United States) Budge Patty	6	6	8	6
(Mexico) Antonio Palafox (Mexico) Esteban Reyes Jr.	6	3	2	7	4
(New Zealand) Corbett Parker (New Zealand) Jeff Robson	2	6	6	5	6
(Poland) Andrzej Licis (Poland) Władysław Skonecki	7	6	3	3	6
(France) Philippe Chatrier (Belgium) Gino Mezzi	5	2	6	6	3
(Sweden) Sven Davidson (Sweden) Ulf Schmidt	6	6	6
(United States) Pablo Eisenberg (United Kingdom) Oliver Prenn	3	4	0
Q	(United Kingdom) Freddie Field (United Kingdom) Bob Powell	3	6	6	7
(United Kingdom) Colin Baxter (United Kingdom) Jimmy Wilson	6	4	4	5
(Denmark) Kurt Nielsen (Denmark) Torben Ulrich	7	2	10	1	6
(United States) Clifton Mayne (United States) Gilbert Shea	5	6	8	6	3
(Chile) Andrés Hammersley (Hungary) Antal Jancsó	6	6	6	11
(India) Premjit Lall (India) Narendra Nath	8	3	4	9
(Republic of Ireland) Vivian Gotto (Republic of Ireland) Joe Hackett	1	2	2
3	(Australia) Mal Anderson (Australia) Ashley Cooper	6	6	6

Second round
(United States) G Mulloy (United States) J Patty	6	6	6
(New Zealand) C Parker (New Zealand) J Robson	2	0	4
(Poland) A Licis (Poland) W Skonecki	4	1	1
(Sweden) S Davidson (Sweden) U Schmidt	6	6	6
Q	(United Kingdom) F Field (United Kingdom) R Powell	4	9	0	4
(Denmark) K Nielsen (Denmark) T Ulrich	6	7	6	6
(Chile) A Hammersley (Hungary) A Jancsó	5	3	4
3	(Australia) M Anderson (Australia) A Cooper	7	6	6

Third round
(United States) G Mulloy (United States) J Patty	1	6	8	7
(Sweden) S Davidson (Sweden) U Schmidt	6	4	6	5
(Denmark) K Nielsen (Denmark) T Ulrich	10	7	1	2
3	(Australia) M Anderson (Australia) A Cooper	12	5	6	6

Quarterfinals
(United States) G Mulloy (United States) J Patty	6	6	6
3	(Australia) M Anderson (Australia) A Cooper	3	3	0

==== Section 4 ====
First round
(United Kingdom) Geoff Ward (United Kingdom) Ivor Warwick	1	1	5
(Australia) Jack Arkinstall (Chile) Luis Ayala	6	6	7
(Federation of Rhodesia and Nyasaland) Don Black (United Kingdom) Colin Hannam	7	6	5	4	5
(Canada) Robert Bédard (New Zealand) Peter Nicholls	5	2	7	6	7
(United Kingdom) John Barrett (United Kingdom) Geoffrey Paish	7	6	6
(Greece) Peter Theodoracopulos (United States) Wayne Van Voorhees	5	1	2
(New Zealand) Lew Gerrard (United Kingdom) Alan Mills	6	5	3	2
(Australia) Don Candy (Australia) Mervyn Rose	4	7	6	6
(France) Jean Borotra (France) Pierre Darmon	0	2	1
(United Kingdom) Roger Becker (Australia) Bob Howe	6	6	6
(France) Jean-Pierre Bergerat (France) Robert Haillet	6	6	6
(West Germany) Rupert Huber (West Germany) Peter Scholl	4	3	2
(United Kingdom) Dennis Hughes (United Kingdom) Gerry Oakley	4	6	7	4	6
(Norway) Finn-Dag Jagge (Norway) Gunnar Sjøwall	6	3	5	6	3
(Italy) Umberto Bergamo (Italy) Giorgio Fachini	w/o
2	(United States) Ham Richardson (United States) Vic Seixas

Second round
(Australia) J Arkinstall (Chile) L Ayala	6	6	6
(Canada) R Bédard (New Zealand) P Nicholls	3	2	1
(United Kingdom) J Barrett (United Kingdom) G Paish	5	3	4
(Australia) D Candy (Australia) M Rose	7	6	6
(United Kingdom) R Becker (Australia) R Howe	6	6	6
(France) J-P Bergerat (France) R Haillet	3	1	2
(United Kingdom) D Hughes (United Kingdom) G Oakley	6	6	1	1	4
2	(United States) H Richardson (United States) V Seixas	3	4	6	6	6

Third round
(Australia) J Arkinstall (Chile) L Ayala	4	3	2
(Australia) D Candy (Australia) M Rose	6	6	6
(United Kingdom) R Becker (Australia) R Howe	2	0	9	6	6
2	(United States) H Richardson (United States) V Seixas	6	6	7	1	4

Quarterfinals
(Australia) D Candy (Australia) M Rose	4	6	5	6	5
(United Kingdom) R Becker (Australia) R Howe	6	3	7	3	7
