= 1957 Wimbledon Championships – Women's doubles =

Women's doubles
- 1957 Wimbledon Championships

Final
- Champions: (United States) Althea Gibson (United States) Darlene Hard
- Runners-up: (Australia) Mary Hawton (Australia) Thelma Long
- Score: 6–1, 6–2

Details
- Draw: 48 (5 Q )
- Seeds: 4

Events
| Singles | men | women | | boys | girls |
| Doubles | men | women | mixed | boys | girls |
| ← 1956 · | Wimbledon Championships | · 1958 → |

Defending champion Althea Gibson and her partner Darlene Hard defeated Mary Hawton and Thelma Long in the final, 6–1, 6–2 to win the ladies' doubles tennis title at the 1957 Wimbledon Championships.

Angela Buxton and Gibson were the reigning champions, but Buxton did not compete.

== Seeds ==
1. (United States) Althea Gibson / (United States) Darlene Hard (champions)
2. (Australia) Mary Hawton / (Australia) Thelma Long (final)
3. (United Kingdom) Anne Shilcock / (United Kingdom) Pat Ward (semifinals)
4. (Mexico) Yola Ramírez / (Mexico) Rosie Reyes (semifinals)

Click on the seed number of a player to go to their draw section.

== Draw ==
=== Key ===
- Q = Qualifier
- WC = Wild card
- LL = Lucky loser
- Alt = Alternate
- SE = Special exempt
- PR = Protected ranking
- ITF = ITF entry
- JE = Junior exempt
- w/o = Walkover
- r = Retired
- d = Defaulted
- SR = Special ranking

=== Finals ===
Quarterfinals
2 | (Australia) Mary Hawton (Australia) Thelma Long | 7 | 6
(United Kingdom) Shirley Bloomer (United States) Betty Pratt | 5 | 2
4 | (Mexico) Yola Ramírez (Mexico) Rosie Reyes | 6 | 6
(Australia) Jenny Hoad (Denmark) Milly Vagn-Nielsen | 3 | 4
(Czechoslovakia) Věra Pužejová (West Germany) Erika Vollmer | 3 | 2
3 | (United Kingdom) Anne Shilcock (United Kingdom) Pat Ward | 6 | 6
(United Kingdom) Pat Hird (United Kingdom) Angela Mortimer | 3 | 0
1 | (United States) Althea Gibson (United States) Darlene Hard | 6 | 6

Semifinals
2 | (Australia) Mary Hawton (Australia) Thelma Long | 7 | 6
4 | (Mexico) Yola Ramírez (Mexico) Rosie Reyes | 5 | 2
3 | (United Kingdom) Anne Shilcock (United Kingdom) Pat Ward | 2 | 2
1 | (United States) Althea Gibson (United States) Darlene Hard | 6 | 6

Final
2 | (Australia) Mary Hawton (Australia) Thelma Long | 1 | 2
1 | (United States) Althea Gibson (United States) Darlene Hard | 6 | 6

=== Top half ===
==== Section 1 ====
First round

Second round
2 | (Australia) Mary Hawton (Australia) Thelma Long | 6 | 6
(Switzerland) Heidi Enzen (Switzerland) Ruth Kaufmann | 1 | 1
(New Zealand) Ruia Morrison (New Zealand) Heather Robson | 6 | 3 | 6
(France) Ginette Bucaille (France) Susan Chatrier | 2 | 6 | 4
(United Kingdom) Ann Haydon (United Kingdom) Christine Truman | 6 | 6
(Bermuda) Heather Brewer (South Africa) Jean Forbes | 3 | 3
(United Kingdom) Marion Craig-Smith (United Kingdom) Barbara Knapp | 1 | 3
(United Kingdom) Shirley Bloomer (United States) Betty Pratt | 6 | 6

Third round
2 | (Australia) M Hawton (Australia) T Long | 6 | 6
(New Zealand) R Morrison (New Zealand) H Robson | 2 | 3
(United Kingdom) A Haydon (United Kingdom) C Truman | 7 | 0 | 4
(United Kingdom) S Bloomer (United States) E Pratt | 5 | 6 | 6

Quarterfinals
2 | (Australia) M Hawton (Australia) T Long | 7 | 6
(United Kingdom) S Bloomer (United States) E Pratt | 5 | 2

==== Section 2 ====
First round
4 | (Mexico) Yola Ramírez (Mexico) Rosie Reyes | 6 | 2 | 13
(West Germany) Edda Buding (West Germany) Ilse Buding | 2 | 6 | 11
(United Kingdom) Evelyn Fulton (United Kingdom) Joyce Fulton | 6 | 6
(United Kingdom) Kathleen Holt (United Kingdom) Joan MacLeod | 3 | 2
(Brazil) Maria de Amorim (Belgium) Poucette Bernheim | 0 | 2
(United States) Mimi Arnold (United States) Karol Fageros | 6 | 6
(United Kingdom) Sheila Bramley (United Kingdom) Heather Macfarlane | 6 | 4 | 6
(United Kingdom) Mary Eyre (United Kingdom) Viola White | 1 | 6 | 3
(United Kingdom) Rosemary Deloford (United Kingdom) Elaine Shenton | 3 | 2
(South Africa) Daphne Fancutt (United States) Dorothy Knode | 6 | 6
(United Kingdom) Rita Bentley (United Kingdom) Hazel Cheadle | 8 | 6
(United States) Gloria Butler (Spain) Mary Terán de Weiss | 6 | 4
Q | (United Kingdom) Pauline Drew (United Kingdom) MM Gell | 2 | 2
(Australia) Jenny Hoad (Denmark) Milly Vagn-Nielsen | 6 | 6
(Canada) Hanna Sladek (United Kingdom) Georgie Woodgate | 3 | 4
Q | (United Kingdom) Sidney Brock (United Kingdom) Mrs LL Glover | 6 | 6

Second round
4 | (Mexico) Y Ramírez (Mexico) R Reyes | 6 | 6
(United Kingdom) E Fulton (United Kingdom) J Fulton | 0 | 4
(United States) M Arnold (United States) K Fageros | 6 | 7
(United Kingdom) S Bramley (United Kingdom) H Macfarlane | 2 | 5
(South Africa) D Fancutt (United States) D Knode | 6 | 6
(United Kingdom) R Bentley (United Kingdom) H Cheadle | 3 | 3
(Australia) J Hoad (Denmark) M Vagn-Nielsen | 7 | 6
(United Kingdom) S Brock (United Kingdom) Mrs LL Glover | 5 | 1

Third round
4 | (Mexico) Y Ramírez (Mexico) R Reyes | 8 | 6
(United States) M Arnold (United States) K Fageros | 6 | 3
(South Africa) D Fancutt (United States) D Knode | 6 | 6 | 3
(Australia) J Hoad (Denmark) M Vagn-Nielsen | 1 | 8 | 6

Quarterfinals
4 | (Mexico) Y Ramírez (Mexico) R Reyes | 6 | 6
(Australia) J Hoad (Denmark) M Vagn-Nielsen | 3 | 4

=== Bottom half ===
==== Section 3 ====
First round
(United Kingdom) Pauline Roberts (United Kingdom) Billie Woodgate | 1 | 5
(Czechoslovakia) Věra Pužejová (West Germany) Erika Vollmer | 6 | 7
Q | (United Kingdom) Jenny Wagstaff (United Kingdom) Bobbie Wilson | 6 | 6
(Spain) Pilar Barril (Spain) María Josefa de Riba | 3 | 3
(United Kingdom) Sheila Macintosh (United Kingdom) Janet Morgan | 1 | 3
(United Kingdom) Pearl Panton (United Kingdom) Vera Thomas | 6 | 6
(United Kingdom) Thelma Lister (United Kingdom) Margot Parker | 3 | 6 | 6
(Socialist Federal Republic of Yugoslavia) Marica Cranadak-Milonja (West Germany) Ingeborg Vogler | 6 | 1 | 2
(United Kingdom) Jean Knight (United Kingdom) Anthea Warwick | 5 | 1
(Republic of Ireland) June Fitzpatrick (Republic of Ireland) Heather Flinn | 7 | 6
(South Africa) Sandra Reynolds (South Africa) Renée Schuurman | 7 | 9
(France) Suzanne le Besnerais (Austria) Elizabeth Broz | 5 | 7
Q | (United Kingdom) MG Fry (United Kingdom) Gwen Scott | 2 | 6
(United Kingdom) Carole Levy (United Kingdom) Bea Walter | 6 | 8
(United Kingdom) Gill Evans (United Kingdom) Jill Rook | 3 | 6 | 1
3 | (United Kingdom) Anne Shilcock (United Kingdom) Pat Ward | 6 | 0 | 6

Second round
(Czechoslovakia) V Pužejová (West Germany) E Vollmer | 6 | 7
Q | (United Kingdom) J Wagstaff (United Kingdom) B Wilson | 1 | 5
(United Kingdom) P Panton (United Kingdom) V Thomas | 5 | 6 | 6
(United Kingdom) T Lister (United Kingdom) M Parker | 7 | 4 | 4
(Republic of Ireland) J Fitzpatrick (Republic of Ireland) H Flinn | 7 | 0
(South Africa) S Reynolds (South Africa) R Schuurman | 9 | 6
(United Kingdom) C Levy (United Kingdom) B Walter | 6 | 3 | 2
3 | (United Kingdom) A Shilcock (United Kingdom) P Ward | 4 | 6 | 6

Third round
(Czechoslovakia) V Pužejová (West Germany) E Vollmer | 6 | 6
(United Kingdom) P Panton (United Kingdom) V Thomas | 1 | 1
(South Africa) S Reynolds (South Africa) R Schuurman | 6 | 6 | 2
3 | (United Kingdom) A Shilcock (United Kingdom) P Ward | 8 | 2 | 6

Quarterfinals
(Czechoslovakia) V Pužejová (West Germany) E Vollmer | 3 | 2
3 | (United Kingdom) A Shilcock (United Kingdom) P Ward | 6 | 6

==== Section 4 ====
First round

Second round
(United Kingdom) Pat Hird (United Kingdom) Angela Mortimer | 6 | 6
Q | (Kenya) Fran Marshall (United Kingdom) Joy Michell | 2 | 3
(Hungary) Zsuzsa Körmöczy (Belgium) Christiane Mercelis | 7 | 6
(United Kingdom) Hazel Moorley (Australia) Kay Newcombe | 5 | 3
(Netherlands) Nel van der Storm (Netherlands) Berna Thung | 4 | 8
(United Kingdom) Sheila Armstrong (Australia) Margaret Hellyer | 6 | 10
(United Kingdom) Lorna Cawthorn (United Kingdom) Gem Hoahing | 2 | 2
1 | (United States) Althea Gibson (United States) Darlene Hard | 6 | 6

Third round
(United Kingdom) P Hird (United Kingdom) A Mortimer | 4 | 6 | 6
(Hungary) Z Körmöczy (Belgium) C Mercelis | 6 | 3 | 4
(United Kingdom) S Armstrong (Australia) M Hellyer | 3 | 6
1 | (United States) A Gibson (United States) D Hard | 6 | 8

Quarterfinals
(United Kingdom) P Hird (United Kingdom) A Mortimer | 3 | 0
1 | (United States) A Gibson (United States) D Hard | 6 | 6
