= 1956 Wimbledon Championships – Girls' singles =

Girls' singles
- 1956 Wimbledon Championships

Final
- Champion: (United Kingdom) Ann Haydon
- Runner-up: (West Germany) Ilse Buding
- Score: 6–3, 6–4

Details
- Draw: 12

Events
Singles	men	women		boys	girls
Doubles	men	women	mixed	boys	girls
← 1955 ·	Wimbledon Championships	· 1957 →

Ann Haydon defeated Ilse Buding in the final, 6–3, 6–4 to win the girls' singles tennis title at the 1956 Wimbledon Championships.

== Draw ==
=== Key ===
- Q = Qualifier
- WC = Wild card
- LL = Lucky loser
- Alt = Alternate
- SE = Special exempt
- PR = Protected ranking
- ITF = ITF entry
- JE = Junior exempt
- w/o = Walkover
- r = Retired
- d = Defaulted
- SR = Special ranking

=== Draw ===
First round
(Republic of Ireland) Gene Hogan	7	6
(Belgium) M Rotta	5	1
(Sweden) L Engdahl	2	2
(Austria) Sonja Pachta	6	6
(Norway) K Horn	0	1
(South Africa) Bernice Carr	6	6
(Netherlands) J Markinkelle	2	0
(West Germany) Ilse Buding	6	6

Quarterfinals
(Denmark) Inge Overgaard	0	1
(United Kingdom) Ann Haydon	6	6
(Republic of Ireland) Gene Hogan	3	4
(Austria) Sonja Pachta	6	6
(South Africa) Bernice Carr	4	3
(West Germany) Ilse Buding	6	6
(Czechoslovakia) H Jitka	7	3
(France) E Launay	9	6

Semifinals
(United Kingdom) Ann Haydon	6	6
(Austria) Sonja Pachta	1	0
(West Germany) Ilse Buding	6	6
(France) E Launay	0	3

Final
(United Kingdom) Ann Haydon	6	6
(West Germany) Ilse Buding	3	4
