= 1957 Wimbledon Championships – Boys' singles =

Boys' singles
- 1957 Wimbledon Championships

Final
- Champion: (United Kingdom) Jimmy Tattersall
- Runner-up: (Brazil) Ivo Ribeiro
- Score: 6–2, 6–1

Events
Singles	men	women		boys	girls
Doubles	men	women	mixed	boys	girls
← 1956 ·	Wimbledon Championships	· 1958 →

Jimmy Tattersall defeated Ivo Ribeiro in the final, 6–2, 6–1 to win the boys' singles tennis title at the 1957 Wimbledon Championships.

== Draw ==
Key

- Q = Qualifier
- WC = Wild card
- LL = Lucky loser
- Alt = Alternate
- ITF = ITF entry
- PR = Protected ranking
- SR = Special ranking
- SE = Special exempt
- JE = Junior exempt
- JR = Junior Accelerator Programme entrant
- CO = College Accelerator Programme entrant
- NG = Next Gen Accelerator Program entrant
- w/o = Walkover
- r = Retired
- d = Defaulted

=== Finals ===
Semifinals
(United States) Chris Crawford	6	4	2
(Brazil) Ivo Ribeiro	4	6	6
(Federation of Rhodesia and Nyasaland) Roy Stilwell	7	4
(United Kingdom) Jimmy Tattersall	9	6

Final
(Brazil) Ivo Ribeiro	2	1
(United Kingdom) Jimmy Tattersall	6	6

=== Top half ===
First round
(India) Premjit Lall	8	2	2
(Brazil) Ivo Ribeiro	6	6	6
(Trinidad and Tobago) Alan Price	2	1
(Denmark) Jan Leschly	6	6
(Austria) M Troger	6	3	4
(Japan) S Hirano	4	6	6
(Israel) S Sofiof	1	0
(Finland) Heikki Hedman	6	6

Second round
(United States) Chris Crawford	6	6
(Netherlands) Hans Biesheuvel	2	1
(Czechoslovakia) J Jelínek	1	3
(France) Bernard Boutboul	6	6
(Brazil) I Ribeiro	5	6	6
(Denmark) J Leschly	7	1	4
(Japan) S Hirano	6	6
(Finland) H Hedman	2	2

Quarterfinals
(United States) C Crawford	6	6
(France) B Boutboul	3	3
(Brazil) Ivo Ribeiro	6	6
(Japan) S Hirano	3	3

Semifinals
(United States) C Crawford	6	4	2
(Brazil) I Ribeiro	4	6	6

=== Bottom half ===
First round
(Chile) Patricio Apey	6	7	6
(Norway) Thorvald Moe	3	9	3
(West Germany) Dieter Ecklebe	6	6
(Belgium) A Valentine	4	4
(Republic of Ireland) Derek Arthurs	6	6
(Canada) RW Flower	2	3

Second round
(Chile) P Apey	6	2	3
(West Germany) D Ecklebe	4	6	6
(Republic of Ireland) D Arthurs	2	2
(Federation of Rhodesia and Nyasaland) Roy Stilwell	6	6
(Socialist Federal Republic of Yugoslavia) Boro Jovanović	6	6
(Monaco) Adrien Viviani	3	3
(Pakistan) AA Khokhar	0	0
(United Kingdom) Jimmy Tattersall	6	6

Quarterfinals
(West Germany) D Ecklebe	4	6
(Federation of Rhodesia and Nyasaland) R Stilwell	6	8
(Socialist Federal Republic of Yugoslavia) B Jovanović	4	4
(United Kingdom) J Tattersall	6	6

Semifinals
(Federation of Rhodesia and Nyasaland) R Stilwell	7	4
(United Kingdom) J Tattersall	9	6
