= 1957 Wimbledon Championships – Men's singles =

Men's singles
- 1957 Wimbledon Championships

Final
- Champion: (Australia) Lew Hoad
- Runner-up: (Australia) Ashley Cooper
- Score: 6–2, 6–1, 6–2

Details
- Draw: 128 (10Q)
- Seeds: 8

Events
Singles	men	women		boys	girls
Doubles	men	women	mixed	boys	girls
- Wimbledon Championships

First-seeded Lew Hoad successfully defended his title, defeating Ashley Cooper in the final, 6–2, 6–1, 6–2 to win the gentlemen's singles tennis title at the 1957 Wimbledon Championships.

== Seeds ==
1. (Australia) Lew Hoad (champion)
2. (Australia) Ashley Cooper (final)
3. (United States) Ham Richardson (first round)
4. (Sweden) Sven Davidson (semifinals)
5. (Australia) Neale Fraser (semifinals)
6. (United States) Vic Seixas (quarterfinals)
7. (United States) Herbie Flam (quarterfinals)
8. (Australia) Mervyn Rose (quarterfinals)

Click on the seed number of a player to go to their draw section.

== Draw ==
Key

- Q = Qualifier
- WC = Wild card
- LL = Lucky loser
- Alt = Alternate
- ITF = ITF entry
- PR = Protected ranking
- SR = Special ranking
- SE = Special exempt
- JE = Junior exempt
- JR = Junior Accelerator Programme entrant
- CO = College Accelerator Programme entrant
- NG = Next Gen Accelerator Program entrant
- w/o = Walkover
- r = Retired
- d = Defaulted

=== Finals ===
Quarterfinals
2	(Australia) Ashley Cooper	6	7	6
7	(United States) Herbie Flam	3	5	1
(Sweden) Ulf Schmidt	6	4	8	4	4
5	(Australia) Neale Fraser	1	6	6	6	6
6	(United States) Vic Seixas	7	4	4	4
4	(Sweden) Sven Davidson	5	6	6	6
8	(Australia) Mervyn Rose	4	6	8	3
1	(Australia) Lew Hoad	6	4	10	6

Semifinals
2	(Australia) Ashley Cooper	1	14	6	8
5	(Australia) Neale Fraser	6	12	3	6
4	(Sweden) Sven Davidson	4	4	5
1	(Australia) Lew Hoad	6	6	7

Final
2	(Australia) Ashley Cooper	2	1	2
1	(Australia) Lew Hoad	6	6	6

=== Top half ===
==== Section 1 ====
First round
2	(Australia) Ashley Cooper	6	6	9
(Netherlands) Fred Dehnert	2	1	7
(Sweden) Staffan Stockenberg	2	2	3
(Egypt) Jaroslav Drobný	6	6	6
(France) Robert Haillet	6	11	6
(Norway) Gunnar Sjøwall	4	9	3
(New Zealand) Lew Gerrard	3	3	13
(South Africa) Abe Segal	6	6	15
(Poland) Władysław Skonecki	4	7	3	6	1
(Australia) Neil Gibson	6	5	6	2	6
(Australia) Bob Mark	2	4	2
(United States) Mike Green	6	6	6
(United States) Hugh Stewart	6	6	6
(United Kingdom) Jimmy Tattersall	2	2	4
(United Kingdom) Robin Kipping	7	6	0	3	4
(Mexico) Esteban Reyes Jr.	5	0	6	6	6

Second round
2	(Australia) A Cooper	6	6	6
(Egypt) J Drobný	1	3	3
(France) R Haillet	4	6	6	9
(South Africa) A Segal	6	4	4	7
(Australia) N Gibson	4	5	2
(United States) M Green	6	7	6
(United States) H Stewart	6	6	3	6
(Mexico) E Reyes	2	4	6	3

Third round
2	(Australia) A Cooper	6	6	6
(France) R Haillet	0	2	4
(United States) M Green	6	1
(United States) H Stewart	4	0^{r}

Fourth round
2	(Australia) A Cooper	6	6	9
(United States) M Green	2	3	7

==== Section 2 ====
First round
7	(United States) Herbie Flam	6	6	7
(Switzerland) Paul Blondel	3	4	5
(Italy) Nicola Pietrangeli	4	3	4
(India) Ramanathan Krishnan	6	6	6
(Cuba) Reynaldo Garrido	5	2	2
(Belgium) Jacques Brichant	7	6	6
(Denmark) Torben Ulrich	7	6	5	1
(Canada) Robert Bédard	9	3	7	6
(United Kingdom) John Ward	4	6	9	6
(United Kingdom) Oliver Prenn	6	1	7	3
(United Kingdom) Billy Knight	6	6	4	6
(West Germany) Rupert Huber	2	4	6	3
(Finland) Reino Nyyssönen	1	6	9	3
(United Kingdom) Gerry Oakley	6	2	11	6
(United Kingdom) Tony Clayton	6	6	2	0	2
(Hungary) Antal Jancsó	3	4	6	6	6

Second round
7	(United States) H Flam	3	6	7	5	6
(India) R Krishnan	6	2	5	7	2
(Belgium) J Brichant	6	8	6
(Canada) R Bédard	2	6	4
(United Kingdom) J Ward	1	3	6	1
(United Kingdom) W Knight	6	6	4	6
(United Kingdom) G Oakley	6	6	6
(Hungary) A Jancsó	3	4	4

Third round
7	(United States) H Flam	1	6	6	6
(Belgium) J Brichant	6	2	1	4
(United Kingdom) W Knight	10	3	9	6
(United Kingdom) G Oakley	8	6	7	1

Fourth round
7	(United States) H Flam	6	6	6
(United Kingdom) W Knight	3	1	3

==== Section 3 ====
First round
3	(United States) Ham Richardson	6	4	5	4
(Chile) Luis Ayala	3	6	7	6
(Brazil) Ivo Ribeiro	2	3	3
(Sweden) Ulf Schmidt	6	6	6
(United Kingdom) Howard Walton	3	6	6	0
(Australia) Peter Frankland	6	3	8	6
(France) Paul Rémy	6	6	6
(Denmark) Søren Højberg	4	2	3
(Republic of Ireland) Joe Hackett	2	1	3
(United Kingdom) Alan Mills	6	6	6
(Federation of Rhodesia and Nyasaland) Don Black	3	6	2
(Spain) Emilio Martínez	6	8	6
(Uruguay) Eduardo Argon	8	6	6
(United States) Glenn Bassett	6	4	4
(Australia) Don Candy	6	7	6
(India) Narendra Nath	3	5	3

Second round
(Chile) L Ayala	4	9	2
(Sweden) U Schmidt	6	11	6
(Australia) P Frankland	3	2	0
(France) P Rémy	6	6	6
(United Kingdom) A Mills	6	6	6
(Spain) E Martínez	4	3	3
(Uruguay) E Argon	1	6	3	2
(Australia) D Candy	6	1	6	6

Third round
(Sweden) U Schmidt	6	6	1	1	6
(France) P Rémy	4	1	6	6	4
(United Kingdom) A Mills	6	3	2	4
(Australia) D Candy	2	6	6	6

Fourth round
(Sweden) U Schmidt	6	2	6	11
(Australia) D Candy	4	6	2	9

==== Section 4 ====
First round
5	(Australia) Neale Fraser	6	6	6
Q	(Chile) Ernesto Aguirre	1	2	0
(United Kingdom) Roger Becker	6	6	6
(South Africa) Gordon Forbes	4	3	3
(Australia) Jack Arkinstall	2	0	3
(United Kingdom) Mike Davies	6	6	6
(Socialist Federal Republic of Yugoslavia) Ilija Panajotović	2	1	7
(United Kingdom) Geoffrey Owen	6	6	9
(United States) Budge Patty	6	6	6
(Austria) Freddie Huber	3	4	1
(Mexico) Francisco Contreras	9	6	6
(Belgium) Gino Mezzi	7	1	3
(United States) Mike Franks
(Italy) Giorgio Fachini	w/o
(United Kingdom) Michael Hann	1	3	6	2
(Australia) Warren Woodcock	6	6	4	6

Second round
5	(Australia) N Fraser	6	6	4	6
(United Kingdom) R Becker	3	3	6	4
(United Kingdom) M Davies	6	7	3	7
(United Kingdom) G Owen	3	5	6	5
(United States) J Patty	6	6	6
(Mexico) F Contreras	4	4	0
(United States) M Franks	2	6	2	6	9
(Australia) W Woodcock	6	4	6	0	7

Third round
5	(Australia) N Fraser	6	6	1	1	6
(United Kingdom) M Davies	2	3	6	6	2
(United States) J Patty	6	6	6
(United States) M Franks	4	3	4

Fourth round
5	(Australia) N Fraser	6	6	10	6
(United States) J Patty	3	4	12	4

=== Bottom half ===
==== Section 5 ====
First round
(Australia) Mal Anderson	1	7	7	6
(New Zealand) Jeff Robson	6	5	5	4
(France) Jean-Claude Molinari	6	9	11
(United Kingdom) Geoff Ward	4	7	9
(West Germany) Peter Scholl	4	4	4
(Denmark) Kurt Nielsen	6	6	6
(Belgium) Philippe Washer	9	6	5	6
(United Kingdom) Reg Bennett	7	4	7	4
(United Kingdom) Colin Baxter	4	3	3
(Mexico) Antonio Palafox	6	6	6
(Japan) Kosei Kamo	6	6	6
Q	(United States) Chris Crawford	3	3	3
(India) Naresh Kumar	8	9	7
(Australia) Bob Howe	6	7	5
(United States) Clifton Mayne	3	4	2
6	(United States) Vic Seixas	6	6	6

Second round
(Australia) M Anderson	4	6	6	6
(France) J-C Molinari	6	2	2	4
(Denmark) K Nielsen
(Belgium) P Washer	w/o
(Mexico) A Palafox	1	9	3	3
(Japan) K Kamo	6	7	6	6
(India) N Kumar	4	1	4
6	(United States) V Seixas	6	6	6

Third round
(Australia) M Anderson	7	6	6	4	6
(Denmark) K Nielsen	9	2	0	6	3
(Japan) K Kamo	2	2	7	3
6	(United States) V Seixas	6	6	5	6

Fourth round
(Australia) M Anderson	6	3	2	2
6	(United States) V Seixas	4	6	6	6

==== Section 6 ====
First round
(United Kingdom) Bobby Wilson	6	6	6
(Cuba) Orlando Garrido	3	2	3
(Spain) Andrés Gimeno	2	4	6	4
(Chile) Andrés Hammersley	6	6	3	6
(United Kingdom) Ralph Oliver	6	6	6
LL	(United Kingdom) Jeffrey Robinson	3	4	3
Q	(South Africa) Derek Lawer	4	1	6	4
(United States) Gardnar Mulloy	6	6	3	6
(United States) Pablo Eisenberg	6	6	8
(Poland) Andrzej Licis	1	3	6
Q	(United Kingdom) David Gunson	5	5	4
(United States) Sidney Schwartz	7	7	6
(United States) Harry Buttimer	6	6	6
Q	(South Africa) Tony Charnock	4	4	2
Q	(Federation of Rhodesia and Nyasaland) Adrian Bey	3	7	5
4	(Sweden) Sven Davidson	6	9	7

Second round
(United Kingdom) R Wilson	6	6	3	6
(Chile) A Hammersley	2	3	6	2
(United Kingdom) R Oliver	2	3	1
(United States) G Mulloy	6	6	6
(United States) P Eisenberg	6	13	5	1
(United States) S Schwartz	1	15	7	6
(United States) H Buttimer	4	4	4
4	(Sweden) S Davidson	6	6	6

Third round
(United Kingdom) R Wilson	4	6	6	7
(United States) G Mulloy	6	3	3	5
(United States) S Schwartz	1	4	5
4	(Sweden) S Davidson	6	6	7

Fourth round
(United Kingdom) R Wilson	6	1	6	4
4	(Sweden) S Davidson	3	6	8	6

==== Section 7 ====
First round
(South Africa) Gaetan Koenig	7	7	4
(Austria) Franz Saiko	9	9	6
(Colombia) William Álvarez	4	2	6	2
(Venezuela) Isaías Pimentel	6	6	4	6
(Brazil) Carlos Fernandes	6	7	3	6	4
(Denmark) Jørgen Ulrich	3	5	6	8	6
(Czechoslovakia) Jiří Javorský	4	4	4
(United States) John Cranston	6	6	6
(United Kingdom) Geoffrey Paish	6	3	3	3
Q	(United Kingdom) Norman Kitovitz	3	6	6	6
(Switzerland) Martin Froesch	7	7	6
(Socialist Federal Republic of Yugoslavia) Ivko Plećević	5	5	0
(New Zealand) Peter Nicholls	4	4	3
(Federation of Rhodesia and Nyasaland) Basil Katz	6	6	6
(Peru) Alex Olmedo	5	10	7	1
8	(Australia) Mervyn Rose	7	12	5	6

Second round
(Austria) F Saiko	2	2	3
(Venezuela) I Pimentel	6	6	6
(Denmark) J Ulrich	6	6	3	6
(United States) J Cranston	3	4	6	1
Q	(United Kingdom) N Kitovitz	6	4	6	3	5
(Switzerland) M Froesch	0	6	4	6	7
(Federation of Rhodesia and Nyasaland) B Katz	1	5	5
8	(Australia) M Rose	6	7	7

Third round
(Venezuela) I Pimentel	6	6	3	6
(Denmark) J Ulrich	2	2	6	3
(Switzerland) M Froesch	2	4	2
8	(Australia) M Rose	6	6	6

Fourth round
(Venezuela) I Pimentel	3	3	4
8	(Australia) M Rose	6	6	6

==== Section 8 ====
First round
(United Kingdom) Tony Pickard	6	6	6
(Netherlands) Hans van Dalsum	0	1	2
(United Kingdom) Eric Bulmer	4	3	6	6	3
(Italy) Orlando Sirola	6	6	4	3	6
(United Kingdom) John Barrett	4	10	7	6	6
Q	(United States) Bob Sherman	6	12	5	3	1
(United States) Gilbert Shea	6	3	1
(Australia) Roy Emerson	8	6	6
(United States) John Lesch	6	6	4	6
(Mexico) Mario Llamas	2	2	6	4
Q	(New Zealand) Corbett Parker	3	8	6	6
Q	(United Kingdom) Dennis Hughes	6	6	3	1
(South Africa) Trevor Fancutt	6	7	6	6
(United Kingdom) Colin Hannam	3	5	8	3
(France) Pierre Darmon	2	4	3
1	(Australia) Lew Hoad	6	6	6

Second round
(United Kingdom) A Pickard	8	3	6	3
(Italy) O Sirola	6	6	8	6
(United Kingdom) J Barrett	1	1	4
(Australia) R Emerson	6	6	6
(United States) J Lesch	8	3	6	6
Q	(New Zealand) C Parker	6	6	4	3
(South Africa) T Fancutt	4	2	1
1	(Australia) L Hoad	6	6	6

Third round
(Italy) O Sirola	3	6	1	4
(Australia) R Emerson	6	2	6	6
(United States) J Lesch	3	7	4
1	(Australia) L Hoad	6	9	6

Fourth round
(Australia) R Emerson	4	4	2
1	(Australia) L Hoad	6	6	6

Preceded by 1957 French Championships	Grand Slams; Men's Singles	Succeeded by 1957 U.S. Championships
