= J. Clarke =

J. Clarke may refer to:

- Ghetts, Justin Clarke, a British rapper and songwriter (born 9 October 1984)
- J. Clarke (Leicestershire cricketer)
- Jay Clarke (tennis), a British tennis player (born 27 July 1998)
- Jean Clarke, a former US tennis player – see 1956 Wimbledon Championships – Women's Singles
