= 1956 Wimbledon Championships =

- Date: 25 June – 7 July
- Edition: 70th
- Category: Grand Slam
- Surface: Grass
- Location: Church Road; SW19, Wimbledon, London, United Kingdom
- Venue: All England Lawn Tennis and Croquet Club
- Attendance: 276,861

Champions

Men's singles
- (Australia) Lew Hoad

Women's singles
- (United States) Shirley Fry

Men's doubles
- (Australia) Lew Hoad / (Australia) Ken Rosewall

Women's doubles
- (United Kingdom) Angela Buxton / (United States) Althea Gibson

Mixed doubles
- (United States) Vic Seixas / (United States) Shirley Fry

Boys' singles
- (United States) Ronnie Holmberg

Girls' singles
- (United Kingdom) Ann Haydon
← 1955 ·	Wimbledon Championships	· 1957 →

The 1956 Wimbledon Championships took place on the outdoor grass courts at the All England Lawn Tennis and Croquet Club in Wimbledon, London, United Kingdom. The tournament was held from Monday 25 June until Saturday 7 July 1956. It was the 70th staging of the Wimbledon Championships, and the third Grand Slam tennis event of 1956. Lew Hoad and Shirley Fry won the singles titles.

== Champions ==
=== Seniors ===
==== Men's singles ====
(Australia) Lew Hoad defeated (Australia) Ken Rosewall, 6–2, 4–6, 7–5, 6–4

==== Women's singles ====
(United States) Shirley Fry defeated (United Kingdom) Angela Buxton, 6–3, 6–1

==== Men's doubles ====
(Australia) Lew Hoad / (Australia) Ken Rosewall defeated (Italy) Nicola Pietrangeli / (Italy) Orlando Sirola, 7–5, 6–2, 6–1

==== Women's doubles ====
(United Kingdom) Angela Buxton / (United States) Althea Gibson defeated (Australia) Fay Muller / (Australia) Daphne Seeney, 6–1, 8–6

==== Mixed doubles ====
(United States) Vic Seixas / (United States) Shirley Fry defeated (United States) Gardnar Mulloy / (United States) Althea Gibson, 2–6, 6–2, 7–5

=== Juniors ===
==== Boys' singles ====
(United States) Ronnie Holmberg defeated (Australia) Rod Laver, 6–1, 6–1

==== Girls' singles ====
(United Kingdom) Ann Haydon defeated (West Germany) Ilse Buding, 6–3, 6–4

Preceded by 1956 French Championships	Grand Slams	Succeeded by 1956 U.S. National Championships
