= 1957 Wimbledon Championships =

- Date: 24 June – 6 July
- Edition: 71st
- Category: Grand Slam
- Surface: Grass
- Location: Church Road; SW19, Wimbledon, London, United Kingdom
- Venue: All England Lawn Tennis and Croquet Club
- Attendance: 272,125

Champions

Men's singles
- (Australia) Lew Hoad

Women's singles
- (United States) Althea Gibson

Men's doubles
- (United States) Gardnar Mulloy / (United States) Budge Patty

Women's doubles
- (United States) Althea Gibson / (United States) Darlene Hard

Mixed doubles
- (Australia) Mervyn Rose / (United States) Darlene Hard

Boys' singles
- (United Kingdom) Jimmy Tattersall

Girls' singles
- (United States) Mimi Arnold
← 1956 ·	Wimbledon Championships	· 1958 →

The 1957 Wimbledon Championships took place on the outdoor grass courts at the All England Lawn Tennis and Croquet Club in Wimbledon, London, United Kingdom. The tournament was held from Monday 24 June until Saturday 6 July 1957. It was the 71st staging of the Wimbledon Championships, and the third Grand Slam tennis event of 1957. Lew Hoad and Althea Gibson won the singles titles.

== Champions ==
=== Seniors ===
==== Men's singles ====
(Australia) Lew Hoad defeated (Australia) Ashley Cooper, 6–2, 6–1, 6–2

==== Women's singles ====
(United States) Althea Gibson defeated (United States) Darlene Hard, 6–3, 6–2

==== Men's doubles ====
(United States) Gardnar Mulloy / (United States) Budge Patty defeated (Australia) Neale Fraser / (Australia) Lew Hoad, 8–10, 6–4, 6–4, 6–4

==== Women's doubles ====
(United States) Althea Gibson / (United States) Darlene Hard defeated (Australia) Mary Hawton / (Australia) Thelma Long, 6–1, 6–2

==== Mixed doubles ====
(Australia) Mervyn Rose / (United States) Darlene Hard defeated (Australia) Neale Fraser / (United States) Althea Gibson, 6–4, 7–5

=== Juniors ===
==== Boys' singles ====
(United Kingdom) Jimmy Tattersall defeated (Brazil) Ivo Ribeiro, 6–2, 6–1

==== Girls' singles ====
(United States) Mimi Arnold defeated (Mexico) Rosie Reyes, 8–6, 6–2

Preceded by 1957 French Championships	Grand Slams	Succeeded by 1957 U.S. National Championships
