= Border, Eastern Cape =

Region of Eastern Cape province in South Africa

Border is a region of Eastern Cape province in South Africa, comprising roughly the eastern half of the province. Its main centre is East London.

Like the Boland region in Western Cape, Border does not have defined boundaries. The name of the region relates to the region once constituting the 'border' between the formerly Dutch and later British Cape Colony to the west, and the Xhosa Kingdom to the east, and was the site of a prolonged series of colonial wars from 1779 to 1879. The Border region was governed as the British Kaffraria Colony from 1847 and was annexed into the Cape Colony in 1866. During apartheid, part of the Border region was designated as the Bantustan of Ciskei, to which Xhosa people from the neighbouring Cape Province were forcibly relocated.

The name has long been applied to sports teams that have represented the region in South African interprovincial competitions. The Border rugby union team has competed in interprovincial rugby union since 1891, and the Border cricket team has competed in interprovincial cricket since 1898. The Border Tennis Association is one of the 14 provincial members of Tennis South Africa. Buster Farrer represented Border in six sports: cricket, tennis, squash, hockey, golf and bowls.

== See also ==
- Xhosa Wars
- 1820 Settlers
