= Stephen Farrer =

South African cricketer

Personal information
- Full name: Stephen Eric Penfold Farrer
- Born: 28 October 1907; Grahamstown, Cape Colony
- Died: 6 August 1994 (aged 86); King William's Town, Cape Province, South Africa
- Nickname: Cocky
- Batting: Left-handed
- Relatives: Buster Farrer (son)

Domestic team information
- Years: Team
- 1929/30–1947/48: Border

Career statistics
Competition	First-class
Matches	5
Runs scored	122
Batting average	12.20
100s/50s	0/0
Top score	33
Catches/stumpings	2/–
- Source: Cricinfo, 20 January 2018

Stephen Eric Penfold "Cocky" Farrer (28 October 1907 – 6 August 1994) was a South African cricketer who played five first-class cricket matches for Border: three in 1929–30 and two, as captain, in 1947–48.

Farrer was educated at Grey High School in Port Elizabeth and at Rhodes University, where he obtained a law degree. He married Norah Street in 1934 and they had two children, Margaret and William, known as "Buster". Buster played Test cricket for South Africa and also represented South Africa at tennis and hockey.

After working for some years as a lawyer, Stephen opened a sporting goods shop in King William's Town. He served as president of the Border Cricket Union and president of the Border Lawn Tennis Association.
