= 1956 Wimbledon Championships – Boys' singles =

Boys' singles
- 1956 Wimbledon Championships

Final
- Champion: (United States) Ronnie Holmberg
- Runner-up: (Australia) Rod Laver
- Score: 6–1, 6–1

Events
Singles	men	women		boys	girls
Doubles	men	women	mixed	boys	girls
← 1955 ·	Wimbledon Championships	· 1957 →

Ronnie Holmberg defeated Rod Laver in the final, 6–1, 6–1 to win the boys' singles tennis title at the 1956 Wimbledon Championships.

== Draw ==
=== Key ===
- Q = Qualifier
- WC = Wild card
- LL = Lucky loser
- Alt = Alternate
- SE = Special exempt
- PR = Protected ranking
- ITF = ITF entry
- JE = Junior exempt
- w/o = Walkover
- r = Retired
- d = Defaulted
- SR = Special ranking

=== Finals ===
Semifinals
(United States) Ronnie Holmberg	6	8
(Tunisia) Mustapha Belkhodja	1	6
(Pakistan) Mohammad Naeem	6	3	1
(Australia) Rod Laver	3	6	6

Final
(United States) Ronnie Holmberg	6	6
(Australia) Rod Laver	1	1

=== Top half ===
First round
(Trinidad and Tobago) Peter Valdez	5	5
(Sweden) Jan Josefsson	7	7
(Netherlands) Hans Biesheuvel	2	2
(Tunisia) Mustapha Belkhodja	6	6

Second round
(Austria) O Mulli	1	1
(United States) Ronnie Holmberg	6	6
(Norway) H Larsen	2	1
(West Germany) Wilhelm Bungert	6	6
(India) Akhtar Ali	6	6
(Belgium) G Gevers	4	3
(Sweden) J Josefsson	2	2
(Tunisia) M Belkhodja	6	6

Quarterfinals
(United States) R Holmberg	7	6
(West Germany) W Bungert	5	4
(India) A Ali	1	1
(Tunisia) M Belkhodja	6	6

Semifinals
(United States) R Holmberg	6	8
(Tunisia) M Belkhodja	1	6

=== Bottom half ===
First round
(United Kingdom) Mike Sangster	6	2	5
(Czechoslovakia) J Jelínek	3	6	7
(Monaco) Adrien Viviani	3	1
(Pakistan) Mohammad Naeem	6	6

Second round
(Czechoslovakia) J Jelínek	6	2	3
(Pakistan) M Naeem	3	6	6
(Switzerland) Bruno Spielmann	2	1
(South Africa) Brian Page	6	6
(Denmark) B Nyløkke	3	3
(Australia) Rod Laver	6	6
(Republic of Ireland) G Cleary	3	8
(Socialist Federal Republic of Yugoslavia) Bogdan Miletić	6	10

Quarterfinals
(Pakistan) M Naeem	6	8
(South Africa) B Page	0	6
(Australia) R Laver	6	6
(Socialist Federal Republic of Yugoslavia) B Miletić	0	3

Semifinals
(Pakistan) M Naeem	6	3	1
(Australia) R Laver	3	6	6
