= Patricio Apey =

Chilean tennis player (born 1939)

Patricio Apey (born August 4, 1939), is a former tennis player from Viña del Mar, Chile who has trained and managed various players.

He played in the Davis Cup in 1961 and 1962. He was the trainer of Argentinian players Gabriela Sabatini and Guillermo Coria, Chilean Fernando González, Venezuelan Roberto Maytín, and others.
