= Buster Farrer =

South African cricketer (1936–2025)

Personal information
- Full name: William Stephen Farrer
- Born: 8 December 1936; King William's Town, Cape Province, South Africa
- Died: 31 January 2025 (aged 88); East London, Eastern Cape, South Africa
- Batting: Right-handed
- Bowling: Right-arm off-spin
- Relatives: Stephen Farrer (father)

International information
- National side: South Africa
- Test debut: 1 January 1962 v New Zealand
- Last Test: 13 March 1964 v New Zealand

Career statistics
Competition	Test	First-class
Matches	6	69
Runs scored	221	4,815
Batting average	27.62	43.37
100s/50s	0/0	12/22
Top score	40	211
Balls bowled	–	507
Wickets	–	4
Bowling average	–	48.50
5 wickets in innings	–	0
10 wickets in match	–	0
Best bowling	–	1/2
Catches/stumpings	2/–	41/–
- Source: Cricinfo, 29 March 2016

William Stephen "Buster" Farrer (8 December 1936 – 31 January 2025) was a South African cricketer who played in six Test matches between 1962 and 1964. He also played tennis and field hockey at international level, and represented Border in six sports.

== Education and early cricket career ==
Farrer was known as "Buster" from early childhood. His parents excelled at sport: his father Stephen captained the Border cricket team, and his mother won the South African under-18 singles tennis championship.

He attended Dale College, near the family home in King William's Town, excelling in sport and captaining the school cricket team in his final year, 1954. He made his first-class cricket debut for Border in the Currie Cup in the 1954–55 season a few days after his 18th birthday. Playing against North-Eastern Transvaal, he scored 77 in his only innings. He began studying at Rhodes University in Grahamstown for a BA in Physical Education in 1955.

After seven more matches for Border in 1954–55 and 1955–56 without reaching 50, Farrer decided to concentrate on his tennis career.

== Tennis career ==
Farrer represented South African Universities at tennis. In 1956 he was offered a trip to England with a group of young South African tennis players. He accepted, and abandoned his university studies.

After several minor tournaments in England, Farrer played in the singles, men's doubles and mixed doubles at the 1956 Wimbledon Championships. In the singles he beat Dick Potter (Australia) in the first round, 6–4, 6–1, 6–4, but lost to Staffan Stockenberg (Sweden) in the second round, 6–4, 6–2, 12–10. He and Ivor Phillips of South Africa won the first round of the men's doubles against the Egyptian pair Mohamed Badr-el-din and Kamel Moubarek, 6–4, 6–1, 6–4, but lost in the second round to Stockenberg and Ulf Schmidt (Sweden), 6–2, 6–2, 11–9. In the mixed doubles he partnered Estelle van Tonder of South Africa to the third round, where they lost to the British pair Gerry Oakley and Pat Hird, 8–6, 6–2. Phillips and van Tonder were members of Farrer's touring group.

It was Farrer's only Wimbledon, simply because he couldn't afford regular long trips away playing amateur tennis. On his return he took a job in a sporting goods store in Johannesburg run by the former Yugoslavian tennis player Franjo Kukuljević. He improved his tennis in the Johannesburg club competition but was unable to reach the South African Davis Cup team. After he returned to King William's Town to help his father with his growing sporting goods store, he gave up regular tennis because the local standard was so low, and concentrated on cricket.

Although he was right-handed at batting and bowling at cricket, he played tennis and squash left-handed.

== Later cricket career ==
Farrer married Maureen Fullarton in Grahamstown in August 1960.

He returned to first-class cricket in 1960–61, scoring 499 runs in six matches for Border at an average of 55.44, with five 50s. The next season, he was appointed captain of Border, and after one match he was selected for South Africa in the Third Test against New Zealand in Cape Town. Batting at number three he made only 11 and 20, but two weeks later, captaining a South African Colts XI against the New Zealanders on his home ground of East London, he hit 147 not out in the first innings, his first first-class century. He kept his place in the Test side and made 40 in the Fourth Test, and 7 and 10 in the Fifth.

Farrer scored prolifically in 1962–63, 888 runs at 63.42; in two matches against Orange Free State he hit 91 and 100 not out at Welkom and 107 not out at East London. He was selected to tour Australasia in 1963–64, and acted as one of the team selectors on tour. He scored only 185 runs at 20.55 in the first five matches, and despite a score of 107 against the Tasmania Combined XI in Hobart he was unable to make the Test team on the Australian leg of the tour. On several occasions, when a batting spot in the Test team was open, he voted against his own inclusion in favour of others. His form improved when the team arrived in New Zealand, where he scored 144 and 52 in the two two-day matches before the First Test. He played in all three Tests in New Zealand, scoring 30 and 38 not out in Wellington, 39 in Dunedin, and 21 and 5 not out in Auckland.

He scored 66 and 10 when he led Border against MCC in 1964–65, but was not selected for any trial matches or Tests, or for the tour to England that followed in 1965. In 1965–66 he set the record for the highest score for Border with 207 (in 272 minutes out of a team total of 361) against Orange Free State. He scored 95 and 50 for Border against the Australians in 1966–67.

He relinquished the Border captaincy in 1967–68 because work and family commitments did not allow him to spare the time for most matches away from home. But he continued to score prolifically: 459 runs at 57.37 in 1967–68, 521 at 65.12 in 1968–69 (when he broke his own record by scoring 211 against Eastern Province, out of a team total of 355), and 539 at 67.37 in his last season, 1969–70. Against the touring Australian team in 1969–70 he hit 154 and 42. Wisden said his 154 (in a team total of 299) "was only slightly inferior to the masterly Test centuries by Graeme Pollock and Richards at Durban a few days previously [in the Second Test] but ironically the nearest selector was hundreds of miles away". He retired at the end of the season, so it turned out to be his last first-class match.

== Later sports ==
Farrer represented Border at hockey from the early 1960s, and played three matches for South Africa in 1971, against Rhodesia and Australia.

He took up squash after he gave up tennis, and in the 1960s and 1970s he was Border champion several times, and represented Border. Able to play with either hand, when the rules allowed it he sometimes played with a racquet in each hand. In the 1980s he represented South Africa in masters tournaments.

Farrer took up golf more seriously when he gave up cricket, and represented Border in 1977 and 1978. When he was 75 he "beat his age", shooting a gross score of 74 at the East London Golf Club.

Farrer represented Border and South Africa in seniors bowls in the 2000s. He also finished 502nd out of 1229 in the Two Oceans Marathon in 1979, as well as completing the Comrades Marathon the same year. In 1993, 1995 and 1996 he competed in the Argus cycle tour, finishing in the first third of the field each time.

== Personal life and death ==
Buster and Maureen Farrer had a daughter and two sons. Buster ran the family's sporting goods shop in King William's Town for many years before handing it over to his son Colin.

Farrer died at his home in East London, on 31 January 2025, at the age of 88.
