= 1956 Wimbledon Championships – Women's singles =

Women's singles
- 1956 Wimbledon Championships

Final
- Champion: (United States) Shirley Fry
- Runner-up: (United Kingdom) Angela Buxton
- Score: 6–3, 6–1

Details
- Draw: 96 (10Q)
- Seeds: 8

Events
Singles	men	women		boys	girls
Doubles	men	women	mixed	boys	girls
- Wimbledon Championships

Shirley Fry defeated Angela Buxton in the final, 6–3, 6–1 to win the ladies' singles tennis title at the 1956 Wimbledon Championships. Louise Brough was the defending champion, but lost in the semifinals to Fry.

== Seeds ==
1. (United States) Louise Brough (semifinals)
2. (United States) Beverly Fleitz (quarterfinals)
3. (United Kingdom) Angela Mortimer (quarterfinals)
4. (United States) Althea Gibson (quarterfinals)
5. (United States) Shirley Fry (champion)
6. (United Kingdom) Angela Buxton (final)
7. (United States) Dorothy Knode (second round)
8. (United Kingdom) Shirley Bloomer (quarterfinals)

Click on the seed number of a player to go to their draw section.

== Draw ==
Key

- Q = Qualifier
- WC = Wild card
- LL = Lucky loser
- Alt = Alternate
- ITF = ITF entry
- PR = Protected ranking
- SR = Special ranking
- SE = Special exempt
- JE = Junior exempt
- JR = Junior Accelerator Programme entrant
- CO = College Accelerator Programme entrant
- NG = Next Gen Accelerator Program entrant
- w/o = Walkover
- r = Retired
- d = Defaulted

=== Finals ===
Quarterfinals
2	(United States) Beverly Fleitz	w/o
6	(United Kingdom) Angela Buxton
3	(United Kingdom) Angela Mortimer	3	0
(United Kingdom) Pat Ward	6	6
5	(United States) Shirley Fry	4	6	6
4	(United States) Althea Gibson	6	3	4
8	(United Kingdom) Shirley Bloomer	7	1	3
1	(United States) Louise Brough	5	6	6

Semifinals
6	(United Kingdom) Angela Buxton	6	6
(United Kingdom) Pat Ward	1	4
5	(United States) Shirley Fry	6	4	6
1	(United States) Louise Brough	4	6	3

Final
6	(United Kingdom) Angela Buxton	3	1
5	(United States) Shirley Fry	6	6

=== Top half ===
==== Section 1 ====
First round

Second round
2	(United States) Beverly Fleitz	6	6
(Spain) Pilar Barril	4	3
(United Kingdom) Gem Hoahing	6	6
(Australia) Jennifer Edmondson	4	2
(Australia) Daphne Seeney	6	6
(United Kingdom) Leonie Brighton	2	3
(Australia) Nell Hopman	1	4
(Hungary) Zsuzsa Körmöczy	6	6

Third round
2	(United States) B Fleitz	6	6
(United Kingdom) C Hoahing	1	3
(Australia) D Seeney	2	3
(Hungary) Z Körmöczy	6	6

Fourth round
2	(United States) B Fleitz	6	8
(Hungary) Z Körmöczy	0	6

==== Section 2 ====
First round

Second round
6	(United Kingdom) Angela Buxton	6	6
(France) Suzanne le Besnerais	4	0
(United Kingdom) Norma Kemsey-Bourne	4	1
(Denmark) Lisa Gram-Andersen	6	6
(Netherlands) Joopy Roos-Van der Wal	4	6	6
(United Kingdom) Bobbie Wilson	6	2	2
(United Kingdom) Elaine Watson	6	6
(United Kingdom) Joan Curry	2	3

Third round
6	(United Kingdom) A Buxton	6	6
(Denmark) L Gram-Andersen	3	2
(Netherlands) J Roos-Van der Wal	8	2
(United Kingdom) E Watson	10	6

Fourth round
6	(United Kingdom) A Buxton	6	6
(United Kingdom) E Watson	4	4

==== Section 3 ====
First round
3	(United Kingdom) Angela Mortimer	6	4	6
(Australia) Thelma Long	1	6	3
(United Kingdom) Anthea Gibb	4	3
(United Kingdom) Pearl Panton	6	6
Q	(United Kingdom) Hazel Moorley	7	6
(United Kingdom) Sheila Bramley	5	4
(United Kingdom) Denise Collier	2	2
(United States) Darlene Hard	6	6
(United Kingdom) Bea Walter	0	6	6
(United Kingdom) Rosemary Deloford	6	4	1
(Sweden) Birgit Gullbrandsson-Sandén	6	5
(United States) Barbara Davidson	8	7
(South Africa) Thea Hale	6	6
(United Kingdom) Gill Evans	2	2
Q	(France) Florence de la Courtie	6	6
Q	(United Kingdom) Jane Godfrey	4	2

Second round
3	(United Kingdom) A Mortimer	6	6
(United Kingdom) P Panton	1	2
Q	(United Kingdom) H Moorley	2	3
(United States) D Hard	6	6
(United Kingdom) B Walter	3	9	4
(United States) B Davidson	6	7	6
(South Africa) T Hale	7	4	8
Q	(France) F de la Courtie	5	6	6

Third round
3	(United Kingdom) A Mortimer	6	7
(United States) D Hard	3	5
(United States) B Davidson	w/o
(South Africa) T Hale

Fourth round
3	(United Kingdom) A Mortimer	6	6
(South Africa) T Hale	2	0

==== Section 4 ====
First round
7	(United States) Dorothy Knode	8	6
(United Kingdom) Sue Waters	6	2
(United Kingdom) Valerie Lewis	6	0	3
(Czechoslovakia) Věra Pužejová	1	6	6
(United Kingdom) Doreen Spiers	8	5	6
(United Kingdom) Pauline Roberts	6	7	4
(West Germany) Erika Vollmer	6	6
Q	(United Kingdom) Sidney Brock	1	1
(United Kingdom) Sheila Armstrong	0	5
Q	(New Zealand) Elaine Becroft	6	7
(South Africa) Estelle van Tonder	1	5
(United States) Jean Clarke	6	7
(United Kingdom) Heather Macfarlane	3	2
(United Kingdom) Pat Ward	6	6
Q	(United Kingdom) Jill Rook	0	0
(South Africa) Bernice Carr	6	6

Second round
7	(United States) D Knode	4	9	1
(Czechoslovakia) V Pužejová	6	7	6
(United Kingdom) D Spiers	2	0
(West Germany) E Vollmer	6	6
Q	(New Zealand) E Becroft	6	3	7
(United States) J Clarke	3	6	5
(United Kingdom) P Ward	12	4	6
(South Africa) B Carr	10	6	2

Third round
(Czechoslovakia) V Pužejová	10	6
(West Germany) E Vollmer	8	3
Q	(New Zealand) E Becroft	4	4
(United Kingdom) P Ward	6	6

Fourth round
(Czechoslovakia) V Pužejová	3	2
(United Kingdom) P Ward	6	6

=== Bottom half ===
==== Section 5 ====
First round
(Australia) Jenny Hoad	6	3	6
(United Kingdom) Georgie Woodgate	3	6	2
(United Kingdom) Lorna Cawthorn	2	2
(United Kingdom) Vera Thomas	6	6
(United Kingdom) Joan MacLeod	2	6	9
(United Kingdom) Viola White	6	2	7
(United Kingdom) Janet Morgan	4	6	7
Q	(South Africa) Sheila Waddington	6	4	9
(Bermuda) Heather Brewer	6	6
(Netherlands) Nel van der Storm	1	3
(Spain) María Josefa de Riba	7	6
(United Kingdom) Marion Boundy	5	2
(France) Ginette Bucaille	6	6
(Norway) Astrid Winther	2	1
(Belgium) Christiane Mercelis	2	1
5	(United States) Shirley Fry	6	6

Second round
(Australia) J Hoad	8	6
(United Kingdom) V Thomas	6	4
(United Kingdom) J MacLeod	6	0	8
Q	(South Africa) S Waddington	4	6	10
(Bermuda) H Brewer	6	6
(Spain) MJ de Riba	4	0
(France) G Bucaille	3	2
5	(United States) S Fry	6	6

Third round
(Australia) J Hoad	6	6
Q	(South Africa) S Waddington	0	2
(Bermuda) H Brewer	3	4
5	(United States) S Fry	6	6

Fourth round
(Australia) J Hoad	2	2
5	(United States) S Fry	6	6

==== Section 6 ====
First round
(United Kingdom) Kathleen Holt	4	7	6
(Australia) Margaret H. O'Donnell	6	5	4
(United States) Louise Snow	6	6
(United Kingdom) Sheila Speight	0	3
(United Kingdom) Pat Hird	2	6	6
(Republic of Ireland) June Fitzpatrick	6	3	2
(Denmark) Else Schmith	3	4
(Brazil) Ingrid Metzner	6	6
(United Kingdom) Anne Shilcock	6	6
(West Germany) Ilse Buding	3	2
Q	(Australia) Kay Newcombe	0	2
(United Kingdom) Ann Haydon	6	6
Q	(United Kingdom) Pat Wheeler	2	6	6
(United Kingdom) Margot Parker	6	0	2
(West Germany) Edda Buding	4	2
4	(United States) Althea Gibson	6	6

Second round
(United Kingdom) K Holt	3	1
(United States) L Snow	6	6
(United Kingdom) P Hird	3	6	7
(Brazil) I Metzner	6	0	5
(United Kingdom) A Shilcock	3	6	6
(United Kingdom) A Haydon	6	3	2
Q	(United Kingdom) P Wheeler	1	2
4	(United States) A Gibson	6	6

Third round
(United States) L Snow	6	1	2
(United Kingdom) P Hird	3	6	6
(United Kingdom) A Shilcock	6	2	1
4	(United States) A Gibson	4	6	6

Fourth round
(United Kingdom) P Hird	0	4
4	(United States) A Gibson	6	6

==== Section 7 ====
First round

Second round
(South Africa) Sandra Reynolds	4	6	3
(United Kingdom) Pat Brown	6	4	6
(Austria) Elizabeth Broz	2	5
(Sweden) Solveig Gustafsson	6	7
(United States) Betty Pratt	6	6
(United Kingdom) Marion Craig-Smith	4	3
(United Kingdom) Jean Knight	0	0
8	(United Kingdom) Shirley Bloomer	6	6

Third round
(United Kingdom) P Brown	6	6
(Sweden) S Gustafsson	1	3
(United States) B Pratt	6	2	6
8	(United Kingdom) S Bloomer	4	6	8

Fourth round
(United Kingdom) P Brown	2	5
8	(United Kingdom) S Bloomer	6	7

==== Section 8 ====
First round

Second round
(United Kingdom) Caroline Yates-Bell	6	6	6
(United Kingdom) Barbara Knapp	0	8	4
Q	(France) Colette Monnot	3	2
(Australia) Fay Muller	6	6
(United Kingdom) Jennifer Middleton	6	6
(United Kingdom) Pauline Edwards	2	4
(South Africa) Jean Forbes	0	0
1	(United States) Louise Brough	6	6

Third round
(United Kingdom) C Yates-Bell	0	0
(Australia) F Muller	6	6
(United Kingdom) J Middleton	0	4
1	(United States) L Brough	6	6

Fourth round
(Australia) F Muller	3	1
1	(United States) L Brough	6	6

Preceded by 1956 French Championships – Women's singles	Grand Slam women's singles	Succeeded by 1956 U.S. National Championships – Women's singles
