= Mimi Arnold =

American tennis player

- Full name: Mimi Arnold Wheeler
- Country (sports): United States
- Born: February 27, 1939 (age 87) Hollywood, California
- Height: 5 ft 1 in (1.55 m)

Grand Slam singles results
- Wimbledon: QF (1958)
- US Open: 3R (1965)

Grand Slam doubles results
- Wimbledon: QF (1966)

Grand Slam mixed doubles results
- Wimbledon: QF (1957)

Mimi Arnold, also known by her married name Mary Arnold-Wheeler, (born February 27, 1939) is an American former tennis player who was active in the late 1950s and the 1960s.

== Personal life ==
Arnold was born in Hollywood, California, the daughter of tennis player Ethel Burkhardt Arnold who played for the United States in the Wightman Cup. Her mother taught her tennis at age 9. She attended Sequoia High School in Redwood City.

== Career ==
At age 11, she won the junior U.S. Hardcourt Championships singles title. She became junior singles champion at the 1957 Wimbledon Championships, beating Rosie Reyes in the final.

From 1957 to 1968, Arnold competed in five Wimbledon Championships. Her best singles result was reaching the quarterfinals in 1958. In doubles, she reached the quarterfinals in 1966, partnering compatriots Jane Albert. At the U.S. National Championships, her best singles result was reaching the third round in 1965 where she was beaten by fifth-seeded and eventual finalist Billie Jean Moffitt.

Like her mother, she was selected for the U.S. team in the Wightman Cup. In the 1958 Wightman Cup, she played one singles match, against Ann Haydon, which she lost in three sets.

Arnold was inducted into the San Mateo County Sports Hall of Fame in 2007.
