= Peter Scholl =

German tennis player (1934–2019)

- Country (sports): West Germany
- Born: 5 October 1934
- Died: 26 January 2019 (aged 84)

Singles

Grand Slam singles results
- French Open: 2R (1956, 1960)
- Wimbledon: 2R (1955, 1958)
- US Open: 2R (1963)

Peter Scholl (5 October 1934 – 26 January 2019) was a German tennis player.

Born in Baden-Württemberg, Scholl was a protege of Gottfried von Cramm, who trained him and a number of other select players in Duisburg. He was a Davis Cup player for West Germany from 1956 to 1958, with his only singles win coming against France's Pierre Darmon. In 1961 he won West Germany's national indoor singles championship.

Scholl became known after retirement for his instructional tennis books.

== See also ==
- List of Germany Davis Cup team representatives
