= Pat Hird =

British tennis player

- Full name: Patricia Ann Hird
- Country (sports): United Kingdom
- Born: 11 November 1934 (age 91)
- Plays: Right-handed

Singles

Grand Slam singles results
- Wimbledon: 4R (1956, 1959)

Doubles

Grand Slam doubles results
- French Open: QF (1959)
- Wimbledon: QF (1957, 1958)

Grand Slam mixed doubles results
- Wimbledon: 4R (1956, 1957)

Patricia Ann Hird (born 11 November 1934) is a British former tennis player.

Active in the 1950s and 1960s, Hird twice reached the singles fourth round at Wimbledon and was a two-time women's doubles quarter-finalist. In 1954 she was a member of Great Britain's Wightman Cup team, featuring in a doubles rubber with Angela Buxton. She left tennis in the mid-1960s to become a hostess on an ocean liner.
