= Gunnar Høst Sjøwall =

Norwegian portrait photographer and tennis player

Gunnar Høst Sjøwall (22 January 1936 – 9 September 2013) was a Norwegian portrait photographer and former competitive tennis player.

Sjøwall was a son of photographer Gunnar Theodor Sjøwall. As a child, he showed early promise in tennis and was given intensive training. Sjøwall went on to compete in tennis, winning 14 national championships between 1955 and 1966. He also made a good showing in several international tournaments. He represented the clubs SK Njård and Stabekk TK.

Sjøwall had an apprenticeship in photography with Edvard Welinder in Stockholm. He was educated at Institutt for Färgfoto (Institute for Color Photography) in Lund, Sweden.

He won the Portrait of the Year award in the 1967 Photography Yearbook, as well as other national and international awards. He completed a number of portrait assignments for the Norwegian royal family, the Norwegian Nobel Institute, and other large organizations. In 1968 at the age of 32, Sjøwall took over his father's studio. In addition to the assignments noted above, he completed a number of photographic restorations.

He died in September 2013.
