= Ilse Buding =

German tennis player (1939–2023)

- Full name: Ilse Renate Buding
- Country (sports): Argentina (1954); West Germany
- Born: 22 November 1939; Lovrin, Romania
- Died: 5 May 2023 (aged 83); Paris, France
- Plays: Right-handed

Singles

Grand Slam singles results
- French Open: QF (1956)
- Wimbledon: 2R (1957, 1959, 1961)

Doubles

Grand Slam doubles results
- French Open: QF (1957, 1960)
- Wimbledon: QF (1958, 1959)

Grand Slam mixed doubles results
- Wimbledon: 3R (1956)

Ilse Renate Buding (22 November 1939 – 5 May 2023) was a Romanian-born German tennis player who was active from the mid-1950s until 1970.

== Career ==
Buding began playing tennis at age 11 in Buenos Aires, Argentina, where the family had moved to after World War II. In May 1954 she became the Argentinian junior singles champion.

Buding became the French Championships girls' singles champion in 1957 after a victory in the final against Pierrette Seghers.

At the Wimbledon Championships Buding made it to the second round of the singles event in 1957, 1959, and 1961. In the doubles event she reached the quarterfinal in 1958 and 1959. In 1956 she reached the final of the All England Plate, a Wimbledon competition for players who were defeated in the first or second rounds of the singles competition, which she lost in two sets to Thelma Coyne.

Buding won the women's doubles event at the Egyptian International Championships in 1957 partnering her sister Edda.

== Personal life and death ==
Ilse Buding was born on 22 November 1939, in Lovrin, Romania, the second-youngest of four children of Franz and Erika Buding. Her brother Ingo was a two-time junior singles champion at the French Championships, while her sister Edda reached three Grand Slam doubles finals. Buding married British tennis player Mike Davies in July 1959. With her siblings Edda and Ingo she ran a tennis school in Bandol, France, in the late 1970s which their father had founded.

Buding died in Paris on 5 May 2023, at the age of 83.
