= 1959 Wimbledon Championships – Mixed doubles =

Mixed doubles
- 1959 Wimbledon Championships

Final
- Champions: (Australia) Rod Laver (United States) Darlene Hard
- Runners-up: (Australia) Neale Fraser (Brazil) Maria Bueno
- Score: 6–4, 6–3

Details
- Draw: 80 (5Q)
- Seeds: 4

Events
Singles	men	women		boys	girls
Doubles	men	women	mixed	boys	girls
- Wimbledon Championships

Bob Howe and Lorraine Coghlan were the defending champions, but Coghlan did not compete. Howe partnered with Sally Moore but lost in the quarterfinals to Bob Mark and Jeanne Arth.

Rod Laver and Darlene Hard defeated Neale Fraser and Maria Bueno in the final, 6–4, 6–3 to win the mixed doubles tennis title at the 1959 Wimbledon Championships.

== Seeds ==
1. (United Kingdom) Billy Knight / (Mexico) Yola Ramírez (semifinals)
2. (Australia) Neale Fraser / (Brazil) Maria Bueno (final)
3. (Australia) Rod Laver / (United States) Darlene Hard (champions)
4. (Australia) Bob Howe / (United States) Sally Moore (quarterfinals)

Click on the seed number of a player to go to their draw section.

== Draw ==
Key

- Q = Qualifier
- WC = Wild card
- LL = Lucky loser
- Alt = Alternate
- ITF = ITF entry
- PR = Protected ranking
- SR = Special ranking
- SE = Special exempt
- JE = Junior exempt
- JR = Junior Accelerator Programme entrant
- CO = College Accelerator Programme entrant
- NG = Next Gen Accelerator Program entrant
- w/o = Walkover
- r = Retired
- d = Defaulted

=== Finals ===
Quarterfinals
1	(United Kingdom) Billy Knight (Mexico) Yola Ramírez	6	9
(Czechoslovakia) Jiří Javorský (Czechoslovakia) Věra Pužejová	4	7
3	(Australia) Rod Laver (United States) Darlene Hard	6	7
(United Kingdom) Humphrey Truman (United Kingdom) Christine Truman	3	5
(Australia) Bob Mark (United States) Jeanne Arth	6	7
3	(Australia) Bob Howe (United States) Sally Moore	3	5
(Australia) Roy Emerson (South Africa) Sandra Reynolds	3	3
2	(Australia) Neale Fraser (Brazil) Maria Bueno	6	6

Semifinals
1	(United Kingdom) Billy Knight (Mexico) Yola Ramírez	2	7	2
3	(Australia) Rod Laver (United States) Darlene Hard	6	5	6
(Australia) Bob Mark (United States) Jeanne Arth	3	2
2	(Australia) Neale Fraser (Brazil) Maria Bueno	6	6

Final
3	(Australia) Rod Laver (United States) Darlene Hard	6	6
2	(Australia) Neale Fraser (Brazil) Maria Bueno	4	3

=== Top half ===
==== Section 1 ====
First round

Second round
1	(United Kingdom) Billy Knight (Mexico) Yola Ramírez	6	6
(Netherlands) Hans van de Weg (Netherlands) Fredy Marinkelle	1	4
Q	(United Kingdom) Charlie Applewhaite (United Kingdom) Connie Armstrong	6	3	1
(Hungary) István Gulyás (United Kingdom) Pat Hird	4	6	6
(Spain) Jaime Bartrolí (Spain) Mary Terán de Weiss	3	2
(United Kingdom) Alan Mills (United Kingdom) Jill Rook	6	6
(Socialist Federal Republic of Yugoslavia) Milan Branović (United Kingdom) Pat Gotla	4	4
(South Africa) Ray Weedon (South Africa) Meryl Hammill	6	6

Third round
1	(United Kingdom) W Knight (Mexico) Y Ramírez	6	6
(Hungary) I Gulyás (United Kingdom) P Hird	2	3
(United Kingdom) A Mills (United Kingdom) J Rook	6	3	6
(South Africa) R Weedon (South Africa) M Hammill	4	6	3

Fourth round
1	(United Kingdom) W Knight (Mexico) Y Ramírez	6	6
(United Kingdom) A Mills (United Kingdom) J Rook	3	4

==== Section 2 ====
First round

Second round
(Chile) Luis Ayala (Chile) Maria Ayala	4	6	2
(Canada) Paul Willey (United States) Gloria Butler	6	3	6
Q	(Australia) Neville Nette (Australia) Elizabeth Court	3	2
(Czechoslovakia) Jiří Javorský (Czechoslovakia) Věra Pužejová	6	6
(Federation of Rhodesia and Nyasaland) Adrian Bey (United Kingdom) Pauline Edwards	2	1
(South Africa) Abe Segal (United Kingdom) Thelma Lister	6	6
(United Kingdom) Gerry Oakley (United Kingdom) Honor Clarke	4	13	7
(India) Premjit Lall (United Kingdom) Billie Woodgate	6	11	5

Third round
(Canada) P Willey (United States) G Butler	1	0
(Czechoslovakia) J Javorský (Czechoslovakia) V Pužejová	6	6
(South Africa) A Segal (United Kingdom) T Lister	6	12
(United Kingdom) G Oakley (United Kingdom) H Clarke	4	10

Fourth round
(Czechoslovakia) J Javorský (Czechoslovakia) V Pužejová	6	7
(South Africa) A Segal (United Kingdom) T Lister	3	5

==== Section 3 ====
First round

Second round
3	(Australia) Rod Laver (United States) Darlene Hard	6	6
(Denmark) Jørgen Ulrich (United Kingdom) Gem Hoahing	1	3
(United States) Malcolm Fox (Spain) Pilar Barril	1	1
(Australia) Warren Woodcock (United States) Belmar Gunderson	6	6
(Australia) Don Candy (Italy) Lea Pericoli	6	4	9
(Australia) Alan Bailey (United Kingdom) Julie Lintern	4	6	11
(United Kingdom) Freddie Field (United Kingdom) Hazel Cheadle	4	3
(South Africa) Ian Vermaak (United States) Janet Hopps	6	6

Third round
3	(Australia) R Laver (United States) D Hard	6	6
(Australia) W Woodcock (United States) B Gunderson	0	2
(Australia) Alan Bailey (United Kingdom) Julie Lintern	6	2	1
(South Africa) I Vermaak (United States) J Hopps	3	6	6

Fourth round
3	(Australia) R Laver (United States) D Hard	7	6
(South Africa) I Vermaak (United States) J Hopps	5	2

==== Section 4 ====
First round
(Australia) Warren Jacques (United Kingdom) Sheila Armstrong	7	6
(Poland) Czesław Spychała (United Kingdom) Bea Walter	5	2
(Soviet Union) Sergei Likhachev (Soviet Union) Anna Dmitrieva	9	2
Q	(India) Akhtar Ali (United Kingdom) Caroline Leather	11	6
(New Zealand) Lew Gerrard (New Zealand) Ruia Morrison	4	4
(Italy) Nicola Pietrangeli (United Kingdom) Shirley Brasher	6	6
(Cuba) Orlando Garrido (Kenya) Fran Marshall	1	5
(United Kingdom) Howard Walton (Australia) Norma Marsh	6	7
(France) Jean Borotra (France) Susan Chatrier	3	5
(Brazil) Carlos Fernandes (Australia) Margaret Hellyer	6	7
(Republic of Ireland) Tommy Crooks (Republic of Ireland) June Byrne	2	3
(United Kingdom) Humphrey Truman (United Kingdom) Christine Truman	6	6
(United Kingdom) Roger Becker (United Kingdom) Ann Haydon	4	5
(South Africa) John Maloney (United Kingdom) Angela Silk	6	7
(Austria) Ladislav Legenstein (France) Jacqueline Rees-Lewis	1	7
(Denmark) Jan Leschly (Denmark) Ulla Rise	6	9

Second round
(Australia) W Jacques (United Kingdom) S Armstrong	6	11
(India) A Ali (United Kingdom) C Leather	1	9
(Italy) N Pietrangeli (United Kingdom) S Brasher	10	8
(United Kingdom) H Walton (Australia) N Marsh	8	6
(Brazil) C Fernandes (Australia) M Hellyer	2	8
(United Kingdom) H Truman (United Kingdom) C Truman	6	10
(South Africa) J Maloney (United Kingdom) A Silk	6	6
(Denmark) J Leschly (Denmark) U Rise	4	3

Third round
(Australia) W Jacques (United Kingdom) S Armstrong	6	3	7
(Italy) N Pietrangeli (United Kingdom) S Brasher	2	6	5
(United Kingdom) H Truman (United Kingdom) C Truman	7	8	7
(South Africa) J Maloney (United Kingdom) A Silk	5	10	5

Fourth round
(Australia) W Jacques (United Kingdom) S Armstrong	1	4
(United Kingdom) H Truman (United Kingdom) C Truman	6	6

=== Bottom half ===
==== Section 5 ====
First round
(Colombia) William Álvarez (United States) Pat Stewart	6	3	6
(Australia) Harry Hopman (Australia) Nell Hopman	1	6	4
(Denmark) Søren Højberg (Denmark) Lisa Gram-Andersen	9	8
(Chile) José Tort (Chile) Alicia Heegewaldt	7	6
(United Kingdom) Tony Pickard (Australia) Fay Muller	3	3
(France) Pierre Darmon (Mexico) Rosie Reyes	6	6
(United States) Gardnar Mulloy (South Africa) Renée Schuurman	6	3	3
(Australia) Bob Hewitt (United States) Karol Fageros	3	6	6
(Netherlands) Pieter van Eijsden (Netherlands) Marjan Moritz	0	2
(India) Ramanathan Krishnan (West Germany) Edda Buding	6	6
(South Africa) John Hammill (South Africa) Joan Cross	6	2	6
(United Kingdom) Geoff Ward (United Kingdom) Rosemary Deloford	2	6	2
(United Kingdom) Geoffrey Paish (United Kingdom) Anne Shilcock	2	6	9
(Australia) Bob Mark (United States) Jeanne Arth	6	3	11
(Brazil) José Edison Mandarino (United Kingdom) Barbara Knapp	3	6	6
(Australia) Frank Gorman (United Kingdom) Rita Bentley	6	3	1

Second round
(Colombia) W Álvarez (United States) P Stewart	5	6	6
(Denmark) S Højberg (Denmark) L Gram-Andersen	7	4	3
(France) P Darmon (Mexico) R Reyes	6	7
(Australia) R Hewitt (United States) K Fageros	4	5
(India) R Krishnan (West Germany) E Buding	6	7
(South Africa) J Hammill (South Africa) J Cross	4	5
(Australia) R Mark (United States) J Arth	6	6
(Brazil) JE Mandarino (United Kingdom) B Knapp	2	2

Third round
(Colombia) W Álvarez (United States) P Stewart	7	4	6
(France) P Darmon (Mexico) R Reyes	5	6	3
(India) R Krishnan (West Germany) E Buding	3	1
(Australia) R Mark (United States) J Arth	6	6

Fourth round
(Colombia) W Álvarez (United States) P Stewart	1	3
(Australia) R Mark (United States) J Arth	6	6

==== Section 6 ====
First round

Second round
(Egypt) Jaroslav Drobný (United Kingdom) Rita Drobný	w/o
(United Kingdom) Roger Taylor (United Kingdom) Joyce Fulton
(Australia) Martin Mulligan (United Kingdom) Gill Evans	6	6
(Brazil) Ronnie Barnes (Australia) Mary Reitano	4	2
(West Germany) Ingo Buding (West Germany) Ilse Buding	w/o
(United States) Jack Frost (United States) Linda Vail
Q	(West Germany) Gunter Sanders (United Kingdom) Lorna Cawthorn	0	2
4	(Australia) Bob Howe (United States) Sally Moore	6	6

Third round
(United Kingdom) R Taylor (United Kingdom) J Fulton	13	6
(Australia) M Mulligan (United Kingdom) G Evans	11	0
(United States) J Frost (United States) L Vail	5	4
4	(Australia) R Howe (United States) S Moore	7	6

Fourth round
(United Kingdom) R Taylor (United Kingdom) J Fulton	1	3
4	(Australia) R Howe (United States) S Moore	6	6

==== Section 7 ====
First round

Second round
(Australia) Roy Emerson (South Africa) Sandra Reynolds	6	8
(Netherlands) Willem Maris (United Kingdom) Elaine Shenton	0	6
(Socialist Federal Republic of Yugoslavia) Sima Nikolić (Socialist Federal Republic of Yugoslavia) Jelena Genčić	3	5
(Australia) Ken Fletcher (United States) Joan Johnson	6	7
(New Zealand) Brian Woolf (New Zealand) Pat Nettleton	6	6
(United Kingdom) Peter Moys (United Kingdom) Margaret O'Donnell	4	2
(Hungary) Antal Jancsó (Australia) Mary Reitano	12	6
(United Kingdom) Jimmy Tattersall (United Kingdom) Deidre Catt	10	4

Third round
(Australia) R Emerson (South Africa) S Reynolds	12	7
(Australia) K Fletcher (United States) J Johnson	10	5
(New Zealand) B Woolf (New Zealand) P Nettleton	6	3	6
(Hungary) A Jancsó (Australia) M Reitano	3	6	4

Fourth round
(Australia) R Emerson (South Africa) S Reynolds	4	11	7
(New Zealand) B Woolf (New Zealand) P Nettleton	6	9	5

==== Section 8 ====
First round

Second round
(Switzerland) Paul Blondel (Austria) Sonja Pachta	6	8
(Chile) Daniel Achondo (Australia) D McCamley	1	6
(United States) John Fleitz (United States) Beverly Fleitz	3	6	6
(New Zealand) Mark Otway (Belgium) Christiane Mercelis	6	4	4
(South Africa) Gordon Forbes (United Kingdom) Pat Ward	6	7
(Spain) Emilio Martínez (Spain) Alicia Guri	2	5
Q	(Lebanon) Samir Khoury (United Kingdom) Sheila Bramley	4	3
2	(Australia) Neale Fraser (Brazil) Maria Bueno	6	6

Third round
(Switzerland) P Blondel (Austria) S Pachta	4	2
(United States) J Fleitz (United States) B Fleitz	6	6
(South Africa) G Forbes (United Kingdom) P Ward	1	2
2	(Australia) N Fraser (Brazil) M Bueno	6	6

Fourth round
(United States) J Fleitz (United States) B Fleitz	4	2
2	(Australia) N Fraser (Brazil) M Bueno	6	6
