= 1959 Wimbledon Championships – Men's doubles =

Men's doubles
- 1959 Wimbledon Championships

Final
- Champions: (Australia) Roy Emerson (Australia) Neale Fraser
- Runners-up: (Australia) Rod Laver (Australia) Bob Mark
- Score: 8–6, 6–3, 14–16, 9–7

Details
- Draw: 64 (5Q)
- Seeds: 4

Events
Singles	men	women		boys	girls
Doubles	men	women	mixed	boys	girls
- Wimbledon Championships

Sven Davidson and Ulf Schmidt were the defending champions, but decided not to play together. Davidson partnered with Staffan Stockenberg but lost in the first round to Jean-Noël Grinda and Jean-Claude Molinari. Schmidt competed with Jan-Erik Lundqvist but lost in the first round to Roger Becker and Bob Howe.

Roy Emerson and Neale Fraser defeated Rod Laver and Bob Mark in the final, 8–6, 6–3, 14–16, 9–7 to win the gentlemen's doubles tennis title at the 1959 Wimbledon Championship.

== Seeds ==
1. (Australia) Roy Emerson / (Australia) Neale Fraser (champions)
2. (Italy) Nicola Pietrangeli / (Italy) Orlando Sirola (semifinals)
3. (United States) Barry MacKay (tennis) / (United States) Alex Olmedo (third round)
4. (Australia) Rod Laver / (Australia) Bob Mark (final)

Click on the seed number of a player to go to their draw section.

== Draw ==
Key

- Q = Qualifier
- WC = Wild card
- LL = Lucky loser
- Alt = Alternate
- ITF = ITF entry
- PR = Protected ranking
- SR = Special ranking
- SE = Special exempt
- JE = Junior exempt
- JR = Junior Accelerator Programme entrant
- CO = College Accelerator Programme entrant
- NG = Next Gen Accelerator Program entrant
- w/o = Walkover
- r = Retired
- d = Defaulted

=== Finals ===
Quarterfinals
2	(Italy) Nicola Pietrangeli (Italy) Orlando Sirola	6	10	6
(Spain) José Luis Arilla (Spain) Andrés Gimeno	4	8	3
4	(Australia) Rod Laver (Australia) Bob Mark	6	6	8	6
(Chile) Luis Ayala (India) Ramanathan Krishnan	4	8	6	2
(Austria) Ladislav Legenstein (Denmark) Torben Ulrich	6	8	6
(South Africa) Gordon Forbes (South Africa) Abe Segal	3	6	4
(Spain) Juan Manuel Couder (Spain) Manuel Santana	3	14	4
1	(Australia) Roy Emerson (Australia) Neale Fraser	6	16	6

Semifinals
2	(Italy) Nicola Pietrangeli (Italy) Orlando Sirola	4	4	3
4	(Australia) Rod Laver (Australia) Bob Mark	6	6	6
(Austria) Ladislav Legenstein (Denmark) Torben Ulrich	3	2	2
1	(Australia) Roy Emerson (Australia) Neale Fraser	6	6	6

Final
4	(Australia) Rod Laver (Australia) Bob Mark	6	3	16	7
1	(Australia) Roy Emerson (Australia) Neale Fraser	8	6	14	9

=== Top half ===
==== Section 1 ====
First round
2	(Italy) Nicola Pietrangeli (Italy) Orlando Sirola	6	7	6	10
(United Kingdom) Michael Hann (United Kingdom) Ivor Warwick	3	9	2	8
Q	(Australia) Stan Hicks (Australia) Neville Nette	6	6	8	4	3
(United States) Gardnar Mulloy (United States) Budge Patty	8	2	6	6	6
(United States) Glenn Bassett (United States) Bob Sherman	6	6	5	5	8
(West Germany) Wilhelm Bungert (West Germany) Dieter Ecklebe	4	3	7	7	6
(Federation of Rhodesia and Nyasaland) Adrian Bey (South Africa) John Hammill	5	3	3
(United Kingdom) Billy Knight (United Kingdom) Tony Pickard	7	6	6
(Spain) José Luis Arilla (Spain) Andrés Gimeno	6	6	6
(United States) Jon Douglas (United States) Mike Franks	4	3	3
(United Kingdom) Jimmy Tattersall (India) Arcot Udaykumar	6	12	6
(Norway) Finn-Dag Jagge (Norway) Gunnar Sjøwall	1	10	2
(Denmark) Søren Højberg (Denmark) Jan Leschly	6	6	4	6
(Switzerland) Paul Blondel (Cuba) Orlando Garrido	3	2	6	4
(United States) Malcolm Fox (United Kingdom) Geoffrey Owen	6	9	6	2	2
(South Africa) Ian Vermaak (South Africa) Ray Weedon	4	11	1	6	6

Second round
2	(Italy) N Pietrangeli (Italy) O Sirola	6	6	8	8
(United States) G Mulloy (United States) J Patty	3	3	10	6
(United States) G Bassett (United States) R Sherman	w/o
(United Kingdom) W Knight (United Kingdom) A Pickard
(Spain) JL Arilla (Spain) A Gimeno	6	9	7	6
(United Kingdom) J Tattersall (India) A Udaykumar	4	7	9	1
(Denmark) S Højberg (Denmark) J Leschly	0	4	2
(South Africa) I Vermaak (South Africa) R Weedon	6	6	6

Third round
2	(Italy) N Pietrangeli (Italy) O Sirola	6	2	6	19	6
(United Kingdom) W Knight (United Kingdom) A Pickard	4	6	4	12	1
(Spain) JL Arilla (Spain) A Gimeno	6	6	2	6
(South Africa) I Vermaak (South Africa) R Weedon	4	4	6	4

Quarterfinals
2	(Italy) N Pietrangeli (Italy) O Sirola	6	10	6
(Spain) JL Arilla (Spain) A Gimeno	4	8	3

==== Section 2 ====
First round
4	(Australia) Rod Laver (Australia) Bob Mark	6	6	6
(China) Chu Chen Hua (China) Mei Fu Chi	4	4	0
(France) Jean Borotra (United Kingdom) Tony Clayton	8	6	4
(Australia) Ken Fletcher (Australia) Martin Mulligan	10	6	6
(Australia) Dennis Reilly (Canada) Paul Willey	6	2	2	1
(United Kingdom) John Barrett (United States) John Fleitz	3	6	6	6
(South Africa) William Jacobson (United Kingdom) Gerry Oakley	4	2	3
(United Kingdom) Alan Mills (United Kingdom) Geoffrey Paish	6	6	6
(Brazil) Ronnie Barnes (Brazil) Carlos Fernandes	4	6	6	1	6
(Socialist Federal Republic of Yugoslavia) Boro Jovanović (Socialist Federal Republic of Yugoslavia) Ilija Panajotović	6	2	1	6	3
Q	(Australia) Alan Lane (Australia) Barry Phillips-Moore	6	6	3	2	6
(Netherlands) Pieter van Eijsden (Netherlands) Hendrik Goris	1	2	6	6	1
(France) Jean-Noël Grinda (France) Jean-Claude Molinari	6	6	6
(Sweden) Sven Davidson (Sweden) Staffan Stockenberg	1	3	3
(Australia) Frank Gorman (Australia) Bob Hewitt	8	6	8	4
(Chile) Luis Ayala (India) Ramanathan Krishnan	10	4	10	6

Second round
4	(Australia) R Laver (Australia) R Mark	6	6	3	6
(Australia) K Fletcher (Australia) M Mulligan	1	4	6	1
(United Kingdom) J Barrett (United States) J Fleitz	2	9	2
(United Kingdom) A Mills (United Kingdom) G Paish	6	11	6
(Brazil) R Barnes (Brazil) C Fernandes	2	6	6	10
(Australia) A Lane (Australia) B Phillips-Moore	6	2	2	8
(France) J-N Grinda (France) J-C Molinari	3	2	2
(Chile) L Ayala (India) R Krishnan	6	6	6

Third round
4	(Australia) R Laver (Australia) R Mark	6	9	6
(United Kingdom) A Mills (United Kingdom) G Paish	3	7	3
(Brazil) R Barnes (Brazil) C Fernandes	5	2	2
(Chile) L Ayala (India) R Krishnan	7	6	6

Quarterfinals
4	(Australia) R Laver (Australia) R Mark	6	6	8	6
(Chile) L Ayala (India) R Krishnan	4	8	6	2

=== Bottom half ===
==== Section 3 ====
First round
(United States) Jack Frost (Australia) Warren Woodcock	6	3	2	1
(Austria) Ladislav Legenstein (Denmark) Torben Ulrich	4	6	6	6
(Uruguay) Eduardo Argon (Australia) Allan Kendall	7	3	2
Q	(Chile) Daniel Achondo (Chile) José Tort	9	6	6
(Austria) Franz Hainka (Austria) Franz Saiko	6	6	6
(United Kingdom) Colin Baxter (United Kingdom) John Maguire	3	3	4
(Republic of Ireland) Vivian Gotto (Republic of Ireland) Joe Hackett	3	4	7
(United States) Butch Buchholz (Australia) Warren Jacques	6	6	9
(Australia) Alan Bailey (South Africa) Robin Sanders	1	6	8	6	6
(Denmark) Kurt Nielsen (Denmark) Jørgen Ulrich	6	3	10	2	1
(South Africa) Gordon Forbes (South Africa) Abe Segal	6	6	6
(Netherlands) Willem Maris (Netherlands) Hans van de Weg	4	4	3
(United Kingdom) Peter Moys (United Kingdom) John Ward	6	11	10	6
(United Kingdom) Colin Hannam (United Kingdom) Geoff Ward	3	9	12	2
(Hungary) István Gulyás (Czechoslovakia) Jiří Javorský	5	6	3	4
3	(United States) Barry MacKay (tennis) (United States) Alex Olmedo	7	3	6	6

Second round
(Austria) L Legenstein (Denmark) T Ulrich	6	6	6
(Chile) D Achondo (Chile) J Tort	4	3	4
(Austria) F Hainka (Austria) F Saiko	4	8	4
(United States) E Buchholz (Australia) W Jacques	6	10	6
(Australia) A Bailey (South Africa) R Sanders	8	4	0
(South Africa) G Forbes (South Africa) A Segal	10	6	6
(United Kingdom) P Moys (United Kingdom) J Ward	1	3	7	1
3	(United States) B MacKay (United States) A Olmedo	6	6	5	6

Third round
(Austria) L Legenstein (Denmark) T Ulrich	6	9	6
(United States) E Buchholz (Australia) W Jacques	2	7	3
(South Africa) G Forbes (South Africa) A Segal	6	10	2	1	6
3	(United States) B MacKay (United States) A Olmedo	4	8	6	6	1

Quarterfinals
(Austria) L Legenstein (Denmark) T Ulrich	6	8	6
(South Africa) G Forbes (South Africa) A Segal	3	6	4

==== Section 4 ====
First round
Q	(United Kingdom) Clive Bernstein (United Kingdom) Geoff Cass	0	6	7	1
(South Africa) John Maloney (South Africa) Rod Mandelstam	6	8	5	6
(Soviet Union) Toomas Leius (Soviet Union) Sergei Likhachev	4	7	6	6
(Socialist Federal Republic of Yugoslavia) Milan Branović (Australia) Don Candy	6	5	3	3
(Spain) Juan Manuel Couder (Spain) Manuel Santana	8	6	6
LL	(Chile) Ernesto Aguirre (Chile) Patricio Rodríguez	6	3	4
(United Kingdom) Mike Davies (United Kingdom) Bobby Wilson	7	9	6
(Belgium) Jacques Brichant (Hungary) Antal Jancsó	5	7	4
(Socialist Federal Republic of Yugoslavia) Kamilo Keretić (Socialist Federal Republic of Yugoslavia) Sima Nikolić	3	5	6	7	6
Q	(United Kingdom) Roy Dixon (United Kingdom) Freddie Field	6	7	3	5	8
(Sweden) Jan-Erik Lundqvist (Sweden) Ulf Schmidt	6	6	6	4	2
(United Kingdom) Roger Becker (Australia) Bob Howe	2	2	8	6	6
(New Zealand) Lew Gerrard (New Zealand) Mark Otway	6	6	6	9
(France) Alain Bresson (France) Pierre Darmon	3	3	8	7
(Poland) Wiesław Gąsiorek (Poland) Władysław Skonecki	2	0	4
1	(Australia) Roy Emerson (Australia) Neale Fraser	6	6	6

Second round
(South Africa) J Maloney (South Africa) R Mandelstam	7	6	6	6
(Soviet Union) T Leius (Soviet Union) S Likhachev	9	2	1	4
(Spain) JM Couder (Spain) M Santana	3	13	1	6	6
(United Kingdom) M Davies (United Kingdom) R Wilson	6	11	6	3	4
Q	(United Kingdom) R Dixon (United Kingdom) F Field	1	4	4
(United Kingdom) R Becker (Australia) R Howe	6	6	6
(New Zealand) L Gerrard (New Zealand) M Otway	1	2	6	7
1	(Australia) R Emerson (Australia) N Fraser	6	6	1	9

Third round
(South Africa) J Maloney (South Africa) R Mandelstam	1	6	4	6	3
(Spain) JM Couder (Spain) M Santana	6	3	6	4	6
(United Kingdom) R Becker (Australia) R Howe	6	3	4	4
1	(Australia) R Emerson (Australia) N Fraser	4	6	6	6

Quarterfinals
(Spain) JM Couder (Spain) M Santana	3	14	4
1	(Australia) R Emerson (Australia) N Fraser	6	16	6
