= 1959 Wimbledon Championships – Women's singles =

Women's singles
- 1959 Wimbledon Championships

Final
- Champion: (Brazil) Maria Bueno
- Runner-up: (United States) Darlene Hard
- Score: 6–4, 6–3

Details
- Draw: 96 (10Q)
- Seeds: 8

Events
Singles	men	women		boys	girls
Doubles	men	women	mixed	boys	girls
- Wimbledon Championships

Sixth-seeded Maria Bueno defeated Darlene Hard in the final, 6–4, 6–3 to win the ladies' singles tennis title at the 1959 Wimbledon Championships. It was her first major singles title, becoming the first Brazilian to win a singles major. Althea Gibson was the reigning champion, but was ineligible to compete after turning professional.

== Seeds ==
1. (United Kingdom) Christine Truman (fourth round)
2. (United Kingdom) Angela Mortimer (quarterfinals)
3. (United States) Beverly Fleitz (fourth round)
4. (United States) Darlene Hard (final)
5. (South Africa) Sandra Reynolds (semifinals)
6. (Brazil) Maria Bueno (champion)
7. (United States) Sally Moore (semifinals)
8. (United Kingdom) Ann Haydon (quarterfinals)

Click on the seed number of a player to go to their draw section.

== Draw ==
Key

- Q = Qualifier
- WC = Wild card
- LL = Lucky loser
- Alt = Alternate
- ITF = ITF entry
- PR = Protected ranking
- SR = Special ranking
- SE = Special exempt
- JE = Junior exempt
- JR = Junior Accelerator Programme entrant
- CO = College Accelerator Programme entrant
- NG = Next Gen Accelerator Program entrant
- w/o = Walkover
- r = Retired
- d = Defaulted

=== Finals ===
Quarterfinals
2	(United Kingdom) Angela Mortimer	5	6
5	(South Africa) Sandra Reynolds	7	8
4	(United States) Darlene Hard	1	6	7
8	(United Kingdom) Ann Haydon	6	4	5
6	(Brazil) Maria Bueno	6	6
(West Germany) Edda Buding	3	3
7	(United States) Sally Moore	6	6
(Mexico) Yola Ramírez	3	2

Semifinals
5	(South Africa) Sandra Reynolds	4	4
4	(United States) Darlene Hard	6	6
6	(Brazil) Maria Bueno	6	6
7	(United States) Sally Moore	2	4

Final
4	(United States) Darlene Hard	4	3
6	(Brazil) Maria Bueno	6	6

=== Top half ===
==== Section 1 ====
First round

Second round
2	(United Kingdom) Angela Mortimer	6	6
(Spain) Mary Terán de Weiss	0	0
LL	(United Kingdom) Sidney Brock	8	5	4
(Netherlands) Marjan Moritz	6	7	6
(Czechoslovakia) Věra Pužejová	9	6
(Australia) Margaret Hellyer	7	2
(United Kingdom) Pat Hird	6	6
(United Kingdom) Elaine Shenton	2	4

Third round
2	(United Kingdom) A Mortimer	6	6
(Netherlands) M Moritz	0	1
(Czechoslovakia) V Pužejová	7	4
(United Kingdom) P Hird	9	6

Fourth round
2	(United Kingdom) A Mortimer	6	6
(United Kingdom) P Hird	1	2

==== Section 2 ====
First round

Second round
5	(South Africa) Sandra Reynolds	6	6
Q	(United Kingdom) Jenny Trewby	3	2
(Italy) Lea Pericoli	6	7
(Canada) Hanna Sladek	2	5
(Mexico) Rosie Reyes	6	6
(United States) Jeanne Arth	1	4
(South Africa) Marlene Gerson	3	8	6
(New Zealand) Pat Nettleton	6	6	4

Third round
5	(South Africa) S Reynolds	3	7	6
(Italy) L Pericoli	6	5	3
(Mexico) R Reyes	6	8
(South Africa) M Gerson	2	6

Fourth round
5	(South Africa) S Reynolds	6	6
(Mexico) R Reyes	4	2

==== Section 3 ====
First round
4	(United States) Darlene Hard	6	6
Q	(Sweden) Ulla Hultkrantz	1	0
(United Kingdom) Jenny Wagstaff	3	3
(West Germany) Renate Ostermann	6	6
Q	(United Kingdom) Bobbie Wilson	4	8
(United Kingdom) Rosemary Deloford	6	10
(United Kingdom) Carol Webb	6	3	3
(United Kingdom) Margaret R. O'Donnell	2	6	6
(West Germany) Ilse Buding	6	7
(Spain) Alicia Guri	2	5
(Denmark) Lisa Gram-Andersen	3	2
(United Kingdom) Rita Bentley	6	6
Q	(United Kingdom) Leonie Brighton	9	6
(Austria) Sonja Pachta	7	2
(South Africa) Maryl Hammill	3	6	6
(United Kingdom) Pauline Roberts	6	4	4

Second round
4	(United States) D Hard	7	6
(West Germany) R Ostermann	5	2
(United Kingdom) R Deloford	6	8
(United Kingdom) M R O'Donnell	4	6
(West Germany) I Buding	3	4
(United Kingdom) R Bentley	6	6
Q	(United Kingdom) L Brighton	2	0
(South Africa) M Hammill	6	6

Third round
4	(United States) D Hard	6	6
(United Kingdom) R Deloford	0	2
(United Kingdom) R Bentley	6	6
(South Africa) M Hammill	2	2

Fourth round
4	(United States) D Hard	6	6
(United Kingdom) R Bentley	2	4

==== Section 4 ====
First round
8	(United Kingdom) Ann Haydon	6	6
Q	(Australia) Dawn Thomas	1	0
(France) Susan Chatrier	4	6
(United Kingdom) Jenny Young	6	8
(France) Jacqueline Rees-Lewis	2	6	7
(United Kingdom) Hazel Cheadle	6	1	5
Q	(Kenya) Fran Marshall	1	5
(United Kingdom) Jill Rook	6	7
(United States) Gwyn Thomas	2	6	4
(Australia) Norma Marsh	6	2	6
(United Kingdom) Honor Durose	7	2	4
(Australia) Nell Hopman	5	6	6
Q	(United Kingdom) Valerie Clark	3	5
(United States) Karol Fageros	6	7
(United Kingdom) Vera Thomas	6	6
(United Kingdom) Julie Lintern	4	1

Second round
8	(United Kingdom) A Haydon	6	6
(United Kingdom) J Young	0	3
(France) J Rees-Lewis	4	7	7
(United Kingdom) J Rook	6	5	5
(Australia) N Marsh	6	6
(Australia) E Hopman	4	4
(United States) K Fageros	6	6
(United Kingdom) V Thomas	2	1

Third round
8	(United Kingdom) A Haydon	6	6
(France) J Rees-Lewis	1	4
(Australia) N Marsh
(United States) K Fageros	w/o

Fourth round
8	(United Kingdom) A Haydon	8	6
(Australia) N Marsh	6	2

=== Bottom half ===
==== Section 5 ====
First round
(United Kingdom) Shirley Brasher	6	6
Q	(Australia) Elizabeth Court	3	1
(United States) Belmar Gunderson	0
(Socialist Federal Republic of Yugoslavia) Jelena Genčić	0^{r}
(United Kingdom) Anne Shilcock	1	6	2
(United States) Joan Johnson	6	3	6
(United Kingdom) Pearl Panton	3	5
(New Zealand) Ruia Morrison	6	7
(United States) Mimi Arnold	6	6
(United Kingdom) Joyce Fulton	1	1
(United Kingdom) Deidre Catt	6	6
(United States) Linda Vail	3	1
(West Germany) Margot Dittmeyer	6	6
(Australia) Margaret Carter	2	3
(United Kingdom) Pauline Edwards	1	3
6	(Brazil) Maria Bueno	6	6

Second round
(United Kingdom) S Brasher	8	2	3
(United States) B Gunderson	6	6	6
(United States) J Johnson	3	6	0
(New Zealand) R Morrison	6	4	6
(United States) M Arnold	2	6	6
(United Kingdom) D Catt	6	3	4
(West Germany) M Dittmeyer	6	1	1
6	(Brazil) M Bueno	4	6	6

Third round
(United States) B Gunderson	6	3	3
(New Zealand) R Morrison	3	6	6
(United States) M Arnold	7	3	1
6	(Brazil) M Bueno	5	6	6

Fourth round
(New Zealand) R Morrison	1	5
6	(Brazil) M Bueno	6	7

==== Section 6 ====
First round
(Soviet Union) Anna Dmitrieva	4	4
(United Kingdom) Pat Wheeler	6	6
(United Kingdom) Viola White	3	3
(Australia) Mary Reitano	6	6
(West Germany) Edda Buding	6	6
(United Kingdom) Shirley Hannah	2	4
(Netherlands) Fredy Marinkelle	0	6	2
(France) Florence de la Courtie	6	3	6
(United Kingdom) Margaret Grace	3	2
(Spain) Pilar Barril	6	6
(Belgium) Christiane Mercelis	6	6
Q	(United Kingdom) Louise Grundy	1	4
(United States) Carmen Lampe	6	7	6
(Italy) Silvana Lazzarino	8	5	8
(South Africa) Renée Schuurman	6	4	4
3	(United States) Beverly Fleitz	2	6	6

Second round
(United Kingdom) P Wheeler	6	1	3
(Australia) M Reitano	4	6	6
(West Germany) E Buding	6	6
(France) F de la Courtie	3	3
(Spain) P Barril	1	1
(Belgium) C Mercelis	6	6
(Italy) S Lazzarino	6	4	2
3	(United States) B Fleitz	4	6	6

Third round
(Australia) M Reitano	1	6	4
(West Germany) E Buding	6	2	6
(Belgium) C Mercelis	6	1	4
3	(United States) B Fleitz	4	6	6

Fourth round
(West Germany) E Buding	8	2	7
3	(United States) B Fleitz	6	6	5

==== Section 7 ====
First round

Second round
(Chile) Alicia Heegewaldt	1	4
(West Germany) Erika Launert	6	6
(United States) Janet Hopps	6	6
(South Africa) Joan Cross	3	1
(United States) Pat Stewart	4	2
(France) Paule Courteix	6	6
(Australia) Fay Muller	7	6	4
7	(United States) Sally Moore	5	8	6

Third round
(West Germany) E Launert	1	4
(United States) J Hopps	6	6
(France) P Courteix	4	4
7	(United States) S Moore	6	6

Fourth round
(United States) J Hopps	5	6	4
7	(United States) S Moore	7	2	6

==== Section 8 ====
First round

Second round
(United Kingdom) Caroline Yates-Bell	2	1
(Mexico) Yola Ramírez	6	6
(Republic of Ireland) June Byrne	2	3
(United Kingdom) Sheila Armstrong	6	6
Q	(United Kingdom) Lorna Cawthorn	3	4
(United Kingdom) Pat Ward	6	6
(United Kingdom) Sue Waters	3	5
1	(United Kingdom) Christine Truman	6	7

Third round
(Mexico) Y Ramírez	7	6
(United Kingdom) S Armstrong	5	1
(United Kingdom) P Ward	6	4	3
1	(United Kingdom) C Truman	4	6	6

Fourth round
(Mexico) Y Ramírez	6	6
1	(United Kingdom) C Truman	3	2

Preceded by 1959 French Championships – Women's singles	Grand Slam women's singles	Succeeded by 1959 U.S. National Championships – Women's singles
