= 1957 Wimbledon Championships – Mixed doubles =

Mixed doubles
- 1957 Wimbledon Championships

Final
- Champions: (Australia) Mervyn Rose (United States) Darlene Hard
- Runners-up: (Australia) Neale Fraser (United States) Althea Gibson
- Score: 6–4, 7–5

Details
- Draw: 80 (5Q)
- Seeds: 4

Events
Singles	men	women		boys	girls
Doubles	men	women	mixed	boys	girls
- Wimbledon Championships

Vic Seixas and Shirley Fry were the defending champions, but Fry did not compete. Seixas partnered with Louise Brough, but they lost in the fourth round to Luis Ayala and Thelma Long.

Mervyn Rose and Darlene Hard defeated Neale Fraser and Althea Gibson in the final, 6–4, 7–5 to win the mixed doubles tennis title at the 1957 Wimbledon Championships.

== Seeds ==
1. (United States) Vic Seixas / (United States) Shirley Fry (fourth round)
2. (Australia) Neale Fraser / (United States) Althea Gibson (final)
3. (Czechoslovakia) Jiří Javorský / (Czechoslovakia) Věra Pužejová (third round)
4. (Australia) Mervyn Rose / (United States) Darlene Hard (champions)

Click on the seed number of a player to go to their draw section.

== Draw ==
Key

- Q = Qualifier
- WC = Wild card
- LL = Lucky loser
- Alt = Alternate
- ITF = ITF entry
- PR = Protected ranking
- SR = Special ranking
- SE = Special exempt
- JE = Junior exempt
- JR = Junior Accelerator Programme entrant
- CO = College Accelerator Programme entrant
- NG = Next Gen Accelerator Program entrant
- w/o = Walkover
- r = Retired
- d = Defaulted

=== Finals ===
Quarterfinals
(Chile) Luis Ayala (Australia) Thelma Long	6	6
(United Kingdom) Alan Mills (United Kingdom) Rita Bentley	1	2
4	(Australia) Mervyn Rose (United States) Darlene Hard	6	6
(United States) Sidney Schwartz (United States) Mimi Arnold	3	0
(Australia) Roy Emerson (Australia) Margaret Hellyer	6	6
(Japan) Kosei Kamo (Bermuda) Heather Brewer	1	3
(India) Naresh Kumar (West Germany) Edda Buding	8	7
2	(Australia) Neale Fraser (United States) Althea Gibson	10	9

Semifinals
(Chile) Luis Ayala (Australia) Thelma Long	6	3	2
4	(Australia) Mervyn Rose (United States) Darlene Hard	3	6	6
(Australia) Roy Emerson (Australia) Margaret Hellyer	4	4
2	(Australia) Neale Fraser (United States) Althea Gibson	6	6

Final
4	(Australia) Mervyn Rose (United States) Darlene Hard	6	7
(Australia) Neale Fraser (United States) Althea Gibson	4	5

=== Top half ===
==== Section 1 ====
First round

Second round
1	(United States) Vic Seixas (United States) Louise Brough	6	6
(Socialist Federal Republic of Yugoslavia) Sima Nikolić (Socialist Federal Republic of Yugoslavia) Marica Cranadak-Milonja	3	2
(United Kingdom) Humphrey Truman (United Kingdom) Christine Truman	6	6
(France) Jean-Pierre Bergerat (France) Florence de la Courtie	3	1
Q	(Federation of Rhodesia and Nyasaland) Roy Stilwell (United Kingdom) Jennifer Chamberlain	6	6
(Denmark) Søren Højberg (Denmark) Milly Vagn-Nielsen	3	4
(South Africa) Gordon Forbes (South Africa) Valerie Forbes	4	6	3
(Chile) Luis Ayala (Australia) Thelma Long	6	4	6

Third round
1	(United States) V Seixas (United States) L Brough	6	6
(United Kingdom) H Truman (United Kingdom) C Truman	4	4
(Federation of Rhodesia and Nyasaland) R Stilwell (United Kingdom) J Chamberlain	0	4
(Chile) L Ayala (Australia) T Long	6	6

Fourth round
1	(United States) V Seixas (United States) L Brough	7	6	3
(Chile) L Ayala (Australia) T Long	9	1	6

==== Section 2 ====
First round

Second round
(United Kingdom) Alan Mills (United Kingdom) Rita Bentley	6	6
(United Kingdom) Colin Hannam (United Kingdom) Gill Evans	3	4
(Austria) Freddie Huber (Austria) Elizabeth Broz	8	6
(United Kingdom) Claude Lister (United Kingdom) Thelma Lister	6	2
(United Kingdom) Reg Bennett (United Kingdom) Sheila Armstrong	6	6
(Switzerland) Paul Blondel (Switzerland) Heidi Enzen	2	3
(Netherlands) Fred Dehnert (Netherlands) Nel van der Storm	5	0
Q	(United Kingdom) Eric Crump (United Kingdom) Mrs NR Allport	7	6

Third round
(United Kingdom) A Mills (United Kingdom) R Bentley	4	6	6
(Austria) A Huber (Austria) E Broz	6	1	3
(United Kingdom) R Bennett (United Kingdom) S Armstrong	4	8	6
(United Kingdom) E Crump (United Kingdom) Mrs NR Allport	6	6	2

Fourth round
(United Kingdom) A Mills (United Kingdom) R Bentley	7	7
(United Kingdom) R Bennett (United Kingdom) S Armstrong	5	5

==== Section 3 ====
First round

Second round
4	(Australia) Mervyn Rose (United States) Darlene Hard	6	6
(United Kingdom) Mike Davies (West Germany) Ilse Buding	2	3
(New Zealand) Corbett Parker (United Kingdom) Georgie Woodgate	6	6
(Colombia) William Álvarez (United Kingdom) Gillian Findlay	4	4
(United States) Gardnar Mulloy (United States) Dorothy Knode	6	7
(Finland) Reino Nyyssönen (United Kingdom) Mary Eyre	3	5
(Australia) Jack Arkinstall (South Africa) Renée Schuurman	3	6
(New Zealand) Jeff Robson (New Zealand) Heather Robson	6	8

Third round
4	(Australia) M Rose (United States) D Hard	6	6
(New Zealand) C Parker (United Kingdom) G Woodgate	0	3
(United States) G Mulloy (United States) D Knode	6	8
(New Zealand) J Robson (New Zealand) H Robson	1	6

Fourth round
4	(Australia) M Rose (United States) D Hard	6	6
(United States) G Mulloy (United States) D Knode	2	1

==== Section 4 ====
First round
(New Zealand) Peter Nicholls (United Kingdom) Billie Woodgate	9	4	7
(Spain) Andrés Gimeno (Spain) María Josefa de Riba	7	6	5
(United Kingdom) Billy Knight (United Kingdom) Ann Haydon	3	6	6
(Mexico) Mario Llamas (Belgium) Christiane Mercelis	6	1	8
(Poland) Czesław Spychała (United Kingdom) Bea Walter	8	6	6
(France) Robert Haillet (France) Annie Haillet	10	4	4
(France) Jean Borotra (France) Marie-Odile Bouchet	3	5
(Hungary) Antal Jancsó (United Kingdom) Jill Rook	6	7
(United Kingdom) Howard Walton (United Kingdom) Joy Michell	1	3
(United Kingdom) John Barrett (United Kingdom) Pat Ward	6	6
(Egypt) Jaroslav Drobný (United Kingdom) Rita Drobný	6	2
(United States) Sidney Schwartz (United States) Mimi Arnold	8	6
(United States) Hugh Stewart (West Germany) Erika Vollmer	6	6
Q	(United Kingdom) Bob Powell (United Kingdom) Liz Lawrenson	4	4
(Italy) Nicola Pietrangeli (United States) Karol Fageros	3	7	6
(France) Pierre Darmon (France) Ginette Bucaille	6	5	1

Second round
(New Zealand) P Nicholls (United Kingdom) R Woodgate	3	4
(Mexico) M Llamas (Belgium) C Mercelis	6	6
(Poland) C Spychała (United Kingdom) B Walter	2	6	6
(Hungary) A Jancsó (United Kingdom) J Rook	6	4	4
(United Kingdom) John Barrett (United Kingdom) Pat Ward	5	4
(United States) S Schwartz (United States) M Arnold	7	6
(United States) H Stewart (West Germany) E Vollmer	6	7
(Italy) N Pietrangeli (United States) K Fageros	4	5

Third round
(Mexico) M Llamas (Belgium) C Mercelis	5	6	9
(Poland) C Spychała (United Kingdom) B Walter	7	3	7
(United States) S Schwartz (United States) M Arnold	9	6	8
(United States) H Stewart (West Germany) E Vollmer	11	3	6

Fourth round
(Mexico) M Llamas (Belgium) C Mercelis	5	7
(United States) S Schwartz (United States) M Arnold	7	9

=== Bottom half ===
==== Section 5 ====
First round
(Poland) Władysław Skonecki (Australia) Kay Newcombe	0	1
(United Kingdom) Geoffrey Paish (United Kingdom) Anne Shilcock	6	6
(Australia) Warren Woodcock (Hungary) Zsuzsa Körmöczy	1	4
(Sweden) Sven Davidson (United Kingdom) Shirley Bloomer	6	6
(France) Paul Rémy (France) Susan Chatrier	6	6
(France) Philippe Chatrier (United Kingdom) Vera Thomas	3	2
Q	(United Kingdom) Derek Collins (United Kingdom) Mrs FJ Tomlin	0	3
(Switzerland) Martin Froesch (Switzerland) Ruth Kaufmann	6	6
(Netherlands) Hans van Dalsum (Netherlands) Berna Thung	9	9
(Canada) Robert Bédard (Canada) Anne Bédard	7	7
(Brazil) Carlos Fernandes (Brazil) Maria de Amorim	4	6	7
(United Kingdom) Peter Moys (United Kingdom) Marion Craig-Smith	6	3	5
(Australia) Bob Mark (Australia) Jenny Hoad	6	6	3
(Australia) Roy Emerson (Australia) Margaret Hellyer	1	8	6
(Cuba) Orlando Garrido (West Germany) Ingeborg Vogler	3	6	3
(Spain) Jaime Bartrolí (Spain) Pilar Barril	6	3	6

Second round
(United Kingdom) G Paish (United Kingdom) A Shilcock	12	3	6
(Sweden) S Davidson (United Kingdom) S Bloomer	10	6	8
(France) P Rémy (France) S Chatrier	6	6
(Switzerland) M Froesch (Switzerland) R Kaufmann	3	0
(Netherlands) J van Dalsum (Netherlands) B Thung	4	3
(Brazil) C Fernandes (Brazil) M de Amorim	6	6
(Australia) R Emerson (Australia) M Hellyer	6	7	6
(Spain) J Bartrolí (Spain) P Barril	2	9	3

Third round
(Sweden) S Davidson (United Kingdom) S Bloomer	5	7	3
(France) P Rémy (France) S Chatrier	7	5	6
(Brazil) C Fernandes (Brazil) M de Amorim	4	5
(Australia) R Emerson (Australia) M Hellyer	6	7

Fourth round
(France) P Rémy (France) S Chatrier	2	6	3
(Australia) R Emerson (Australia) M Hellyer	6	3	6

==== Section 6 ====
First round

Second round
Q	(United Kingdom) Basil Hutchins (United Kingdom) Mary Chamberlain	4	8	2
(Japan) Kosei Kamo (Bermuda) Heather Brewer	6	6	6
(South Africa) Gordon Talbot (United Kingdom) Elaine Shenton	6	3	2
(Poland) Andrzej Licis (United Kingdom) Hazel Cheadle	4	6	6
(Venezuela) Isaías Pimentel (France) Suzanne le Besnerais	6	6
(Spain) Emilio Martínez (Spain) Mary Terán de Weiss	2	3
(Australia) Mal Anderson (South Africa) Sandra Reynolds	6	3	4
3	(Czechoslovakia) Jiří Javorský (Czechoslovakia) Věra Pužejová	4	6	6

Third round
(Japan) K Kamo (Bermuda) H Brewer	7	6
(Poland) A Licis (United Kingdom) H Cheadle	5	3
(Venezuela) I Pimentel (France) S le Besnerais	6	7
3	(Czechoslovakia) J Javorský (Czechoslovakia) V Pužejová	4	5

Fourth round
(Japan) K Kamo (Bermuda) H Brewer	6	6
(Venezuela) I Pimentel (France) S le Besnerais	4	3

==== Section 7 ====
First round

Second round
(United Kingdom) John Ward (United Kingdom) Leonie Brighton	3	4
(India) Naresh Kumar (West Germany) Edda Buding	6	6
(Denmark) Jørgen Ulrich (United Kingdom) Pearl Panton	3	2
(Federation of Rhodesia and Nyasaland) Basil Katz (United Kingdom) Viola White	6	6
(Greece) Peter Theodoracopulos (Mexico) Yola Ramírez	0	2
(India) Ramanathan Krishnan (United States) Betty Pratt	6	6
(South Africa) Abe Segal (United States) Gloria Butler	4	6	3
(Australia) Bob Howe (Australia) Mary Hawton	6	4	6

Third round
(India) N Kumar (West Germany) E Buding	3	6	6
(Federation of Rhodesia and Nyasaland) B Katz (United Kingdom) V White	6	3	2
(India) R Krishnan (United States) E Pratt	6	6
(Australia) R Howe (Australia) M Hawton	4	4

Fourth round
(India) N Kumar (West Germany) E Buding	6	5	6
(India) R Krishnan (United States) E Pratt	2	7	3

==== Section 8 ====
First round

Second round
(Australia) Neil Gibson (United Kingdom) Julie Lintern	4	6	6
LL	(United Kingdom) Keith Collar (United Kingdom) Zena Lusty	6	1	1
(United Kingdom) Gerry Oakley (United Kingdom) Pat Hird	6	6
(South Africa) Trevor Fancutt (South Africa) Daphne Fancutt	2	3
(New Zealand) Lew Gerrard (New Zealand) Ruia Morrison	6	7
(United Kingdom) Ivor Warwick (United Kingdom) Anthea Warwick	1	5
(United Kingdom) Eric Bulmer (United Kingdom) Pauline Roberts	2	2
2	(Australia) Neale Fraser (United States) Althea Gibson	6	6

Third round
(Australia) N Gibson (United Kingdom) J Lintern	4	12	1
(United Kingdom) G Oakley (United Kingdom) P Hird	6	10	6
(New Zealand) L Gerrard (New Zealand) R Morrison	2	4
2	(Australia) N Fraser (United States) A Gibson	6	6

Fourth round
(United Kingdom) G Oakley (United Kingdom) P Hird	1	4
2	(Australia) N Fraser (United States) A Gibson	6	6
