= 1959 Wimbledon Championships – Women's doubles =

Tennis tournament

Women's doubles
- 1959 Wimbledon Championships

Final
- Champions: (United States) Jeanne Arth (United States) Darlene Hard
- Runners-up: (United States) Beverly Fleitz (United Kingdom) Christine Truman
- Score: 2–6, 6–2, 6–3

Details
- Draw: 48 (4 Q )
- Seeds: 4

Events
Singles	men	women		boys	girls
Doubles	men	women	mixed	boys	girls
← 1958 ·	Wimbledon Championships	· 1960 →

Maria Bueno and Althea Gibson were the defending champions, but Gibson was ineligible to compete after turning professional. Bueno partnered with Janet Hopps but lost in the first round to Beverly Fleitz and Christine Truman.

Jeanne Arth and Darlene Hard defeated Fleitz and Truman in the final, 2–6, 6–2, 6–3 to win the ladies doubles tennis title at the 1959 Wimbledon Championships.

== Seeds ==
1. (United States) Jeanne Arth / (United States) Darlene Hard (champions)
2. (Mexico) Yola Ramírez / (Mexico) Rosie Reyes (semifinals)
3. (United States) Beverly Fleitz / (United Kingdom) Christine Truman (final)
4. (South Africa) Sandra Reynolds / (South Africa) Renée Schuurman (semifinals)

Click on the seed number of a player to go to their draw section.

== Draw ==
=== Key ===
- Q = Qualifier
- WC = Wild card
- LL = Lucky loser
- Alt = Alternate
- SE = Special exempt
- PR = Protected ranking
- ITF = ITF entry
- JE = Junior exempt
- w/o = Walkover
- r = Retired
- d = Defaulted
- SR = Special ranking

=== Finals ===
Quarterfinals
1	(United States) Jeanne Arth (United States) Darlene Hard	6	6
(France) Susan Chatrier (United Kingdom) Anne Shilcock	0	1
4	(South Africa) Sandra Reynolds (South Africa) Renée Schuurman	5	6	6
(United Kingdom) Ann Haydon (United Kingdom) Angela Mortimer	7	4	1
(United States) Karol Fageros (Australia) Margaret Hellyer	4	1
3	(United States) Beverly Fleitz (United Kingdom) Christine Truman	6	6
(West Germany) Edda Buding (West Germany) Ilse Buding	2	3
2	(Mexico) Yola Ramírez (Mexico) Rosie Reyes	6	6

Semifinals
1	(United States) Jeanne Arth (United States) Darlene Hard	6	6
4	(South Africa) Sandra Reynolds (South Africa) Renée Schuurman	0	2
3	(United States) Beverly Fleitz (United Kingdom) Christine Truman	8	6
2	(Mexico) Yola Ramírez (Mexico) Rosie Reyes	6	1

Final
1	(United States) Jeanne Arth (United States) Darlene Hard	2	6	6
3	(United States) Beverly Fleitz (United Kingdom) Christine Truman	6	2	3

=== Top half ===
==== Section 1 ====
First round

Second round
1	(United States) Jeanne Arth (United States) Darlene Hard	6	6
(United Kingdom) Deidre Catt (United Kingdom) Jenny Trewby	1	1
(United Kingdom) Carole Levy (Australia) D McCamley	6	8
(Socialist Federal Republic of Yugoslavia) Jelena Genčić (Austria) Sonja Pachta	4	6
(France) Susan Chatrier (United Kingdom) Anne Shilcock	6	6
(United Kingdom) Julie Lintern (United Kingdom) Jenny Young	3	3
Q	(United Kingdom) Loana Bishop (United Kingdom) Mrs FA Devitt	3	0
(Australia) Norma Marsh (Australia) Dawn Thomas	6	6

Third round
1	(United States) J Arth (United States) D Hard	6	6
(United Kingdom) C Levy (Australia) D McCamley	2	0
(France) S Chatrier (United Kingdom) A Shilcock	6	6
(Australia) N Marsh (Australia) D Thomas	4	4

Quarterfinals
1	(United States) J Arth (United States) D Hard	6	6
(France) S Chatrier (United Kingdom) A Shilcock	0	1

==== Section 2 ====
First round
4	(South Africa) Sandra Reynolds (South Africa) Renée Schuurman	6	6
(Australia) Nell Hopman (Canada) Hanna Sladek	2	4
(Australia) Margaret Carter (United Kingdom) Pat Hird	6	6
(Republic of Ireland) Gene Hogan (Republic of Ireland) Eleanor O'Neill	0	3
(United Kingdom) Bea Walter (United Kingdom) Billie Woodgate	5	6	5
(West Germany) Erika Launert (West Germany) Renate Ostermann	7	4	7
(New Zealand) Ruia Morrison (New Zealand) Pat Nettleton	6	6
(United States) Mimi Arnold (United States) Linda Vail	4	0
(United Kingdom) Rita Bentley (United Kingdom) Pauline Edwards	1	4
(United Kingdom) Jill Rook (United Kingdom) Caroline Yates-Bell	6	6
(Soviet Union) Anna Dmitrieva (United Kingdom) Elaine Shenton	1	3
(United Kingdom) Hazel Cheadle (United Kingdom) Gem Hoahing	6	6
(United Kingdom) Ann Haydon (United Kingdom) Angela Mortimer	6	6
Q	(United Kingdom) Honor Clarke (United Kingdom) Vivienne Cox	1	1
(France) Paule Courteix (France) Jacqueline Rees-Lewis	2	3
(United States) Belmar Gunderson (United States) Ruth Jeffery	6	6

Second round
4	(South Africa) S Reynolds (South Africa) R Schuurman	6	6
(Australia) M Carter (United Kingdom) P Hird	1	3
(West Germany) E Launert (West Germany) R Ostermann	1	6	5
(New Zealand) R Morrison (New Zealand) P Nettleton	6	2	7
(United Kingdom) J Rook (United Kingdom) C Yates-Bell	10	5	6
(United Kingdom) H Cheadle (United Kingdom) C Hoahing	8	7	8
(United Kingdom) A Haydon (United Kingdom) A Mortimer	6	6
(United States) B Gunderson (United States) R Jeffery	2	3

Third round
4	(South Africa) S Reynolds (South Africa) R Schuurman	6	6	6
(New Zealand) R Morrison (New Zealand) P Nettleton	8	2	1
(United Kingdom) H Cheadle (United Kingdom) C Hoahing	1	2
(United Kingdom) A Haydon (United Kingdom) A Mortimer	6	6

Quarterfinals
4	(South Africa) S Reynolds (South Africa) R Schuurman	5	6	6
(United Kingdom) A Haydon (United Kingdom) A Mortimer	7	4	1

=== Bottom half ===
==== Section 3 ====
First round
(United Kingdom) Sheila Armstrong (United Kingdom) Margaret O'Donnell	6	3	6
(Republic of Ireland) June Byrne (Republic of Ireland) Mary O'Sullivan	4	6	2
(United States) Carmen Lampe (Spain) Mary Terán de Weiss	0	4
Q	(United Kingdom) Angela Silk (United Kingdom) Carol Webb	6	6
(United States) Karol Fageros (Australia) Margaret Hellyer	3	6	6
(United States) Sally Moore (United States) Gwyn Thomas	6	4	3
(Australia) Fay Muller (Australia) Mary Reitano	6	6
(Sweden) Ulla Hultkrantz (United States) Pat Stewart	0	2
(Netherlands) Fredy Marinkelle (Netherlands) Marjan Moritz	10	7	2
(Spain) Pilar Barril (Spain) Alicia Guri	12	5	6
(United Kingdom) Katherine Clissett (United States) Betsy Lester	4	7
(United Kingdom) Rosemary Deloford (United Kingdom) Pat Wheeler	6	9
(Italy) Silvana Lazzarino (Italy) Lea Pericoli	4	2
(France) Florence de la Courtie (Belgium) Christiane Mercelis	6	6
(Brazil) Maria Bueno (United States) Janet Hopps	5	4
3	(United States) Beverly Fleitz (United Kingdom) Christine Truman	7	6

Second round
(United Kingdom) S Armstrong (United Kingdom) M O'Donnell	6	6
(United Kingdom) A Silk (United Kingdom) C Webb	3	3
(United States) K Fageros (Australia) M Hellyer	6	4	6
(Australia) F Muller (Australia) M Reitano	4	6	4
(Spain) P Barril (Spain) A Guri	1	6	3
(United Kingdom) R Deloford (United Kingdom) P Wheeler	6	2	6
(France) F de la Courtie (Belgium) C Mercelis	2	2
3	(United States) B Fleitz (United Kingdom) C Truman	6	6

Third round
(United Kingdom) S Armstrong (United Kingdom) M O'Donnell	5	4
(United States) K Fageros (Australia) M Hellyer	7	6
(United Kingdom) R Deloford (United Kingdom) P Wheeler	4	2
3	(United States) B Fleitz (United Kingdom) C Truman	6	6

Quarterfinals
(United States) K Fageros (Australia) M Hellyer	4	1
3	(United States) B Fleitz (United Kingdom) C Truman	6	6

==== Section 4 ====
First round

Second round
(West Germany) Edda Buding (West Germany) Ilse Buding	6	10
(United Kingdom) Gill Evans (United Kingdom) Pauline Roberts	1	8
(South Africa) Joan Cross (South Africa) Marlene Gerson	7	8
Q	(United Kingdom) Jenny Wagstaff (United Kingdom) Bobbie Wilson	5	6
(Czechoslovakia) Věra Pužejová (United Kingdom) Pat Ward	5	6	8
(United States) Joan Johnson (United States) GD Shepard	7	3	6
(Denmark) Lisa Gram-Andersen (Denmark) Ulla Rise	0	4
2	(Mexico) Yola Ramírez (Mexico) Rosie Reyes	6	6

Third round
(West Germany) E Buding (West Germany) I Buding	6	3	6
(South Africa) J Cross (South Africa) M Gerson	3	6	4
(Czechoslovakia) V Pužejová (United Kingdom) P Ward	3	6	3
2	(Mexico) Y Ramírez (Mexico) R Reyes	6	1	6

Quarterfinals
(West Germany) E Buding (West Germany) I Buding	2	3
2	(Mexico) Y Ramírez (Mexico) R Reyes	6	6
