= 1959 Wimbledon Championships – Men's singles =

Men's singles
- 1959 Wimbledon Championships

Final
- Champion: (United States) Alex Olmedo
- Runner-up: (Australia) Rod Laver
- Score: 6–4, 6–3, 6–4

Details
- Draw: 128 (10Q)
- Seeds: 8

Events
Singles	men	women		boys	girls
Doubles	men	women	mixed	boys	girls
- Wimbledon Championships

Alex Olmedo defeated Rod Laver in the final, 6–4, 6–3, 6–4, to win the gentlemen's singles tennis title at the 1959 Wimbledon Championships. Ashley Cooper was the defending champion, but was ineligible to compete after turning professional.

== Seeds ==
1. (United States) Alex Olmedo (champion)
2. (Australia) Neale Fraser (quarterfinals)
3. (Italy) Nicola Pietrangeli (first round)
4. (United Kingdom) Bobby Wilson (quarterfinals)
5. (United States) Barry MacKay (semifinals)
6. (Chile) Luis Ayala (quarterfinals)
7. (Denmark) Kurt Nielsen (second round)
8. (Australia) Roy Emerson (semifinals)

Click on the seed number of a player to go to their draw section.

== Draw ==
Key

- Q = Qualifier
- WC = Wild card
- LL = Lucky loser
- Alt = Alternate
- ITF = ITF entry
- PR = Protected ranking
- SR = Special ranking
- SE = Special exempt
- JE = Junior exempt
- JR = Junior Accelerator Programme entrant
- CO = College Accelerator Programme entrant
- NG = Next Gen Accelerator Program entrant
- w/o = Walkover
- r = Retired
- d = Defaulted

=== Finals ===
Quarterfinals
2	(Australia) Neale Fraser	7	8	6	3	1
5	(United States) Barry MacKay	5	10	0	6	6
(France) Jean-Claude Molinari	3	3	0
(Australia) Rod Laver	6	6	6
8	(Australia) Roy Emerson	6	6	6
4	(United Kingdom) Bobby Wilson	3	4	2
6	(Chile) Luis Ayala	5	6	3	3
1	(United States) Alex Olmedo	7	3	6	6

Semifinals
5	(United States) Barry MacKay	13	9	8	9	3
(Australia) Rod Laver	11	11	10	7	6
8	(Australia) Roy Emerson	4	0	4
1	(United States) Alex Olmedo	6	6	6

Final
(Australia) Rod Laver	4	3	4
1	(United States) Alex Olmedo	6	6	6

=== Top half ===
==== Section 1 ====
First round
2	(Australia) Neale Fraser	6	6	6
(France) Pierre Darmon	4	4	2
(Austria) Franz Saiko	8	3	6	2
(Brazil) Carlos Fernandes	10	6	4	6
(United States) Bob Sherman	6	4	5	9	6
(Australia) Alan Bailey	4	6	7	7	8
(Norway) Gunnar Sjøwall	1	8	3
(United Kingdom) Michael Hann	6	10	6
(Australia) Allan Kendall	6	6	2	7	8
(Uruguay) Eduardo Argon	4	8	6	5	6
(South Africa) John Maloney	4	2	4
(Italy) Orlando Sirola	6	6	6
(Spain) Manuel Santana	6	6	6
(France) Alain Bresson	0	0	1
Q	(United Kingdom) Roy Dixon	6	13	4	7	4
Q	(United States) Jacques Grigry	3	11	6	9	6

Second round
2	(Australia) N Fraser	6	6	6
(Brazil) C Fernandes	3	1	2
(Australia) A Bailey	2	6	1	3
(United Kingdom) M Hann	6	4	6	6
(Australia) A Kendall	7	1	6	8
(Italy) O Sirola	9	6	1	10
(Spain) M Santana	6	4	4	9	6
Q	(United States) J Grigry	2	6	6	7	1

Third round
2	(Australia) N Fraser	7	6	6
(United Kingdom) M Hann	5	4	2
(Italy) O Sirola	6	9	3	6
(Spain) M Santana	4	7	6	3

Fourth round
2	(Australia) N Fraser	3	6	14	8	6
(Italy) O Sirola	6	3	12	10	3

==== Section 2 ====
First round
5	(United States) Barry MacKay	6	6	3	6
(South Africa) Ian Vermaak	2	2	6	3
(Poland) Władysław Skonecki	6	7	6	7
Q	(India) Jaidip Mukerjea	3	9	4	5
(Socialist Federal Republic of Yugoslavia) Ilija Panajotović	6	4	6	6
(United Kingdom) Jimmy Tattersall	4	6	3	1
(United Kingdom) Geoff Ward	3	2	6	7
(Denmark) Jan Leschly	6	6	3	9
(United Kingdom) Billy Knight	6	6	6
(United Kingdom) John Barrett	2	0	3
(United Kingdom) Roger Becker	3	7	4
(Sweden) Jan-Erik Lundqvist	6	9	6
(New Zealand) Mark Otway	4	4	0
(Australia) Bob Hewitt	6	6	6
(United States) Jon Douglas	4	6	6	6
(United States) Budge Patty	6	1	1	0

Second round
5	(United States) B MacKay	6	6	3	6
(Poland) W Skonecki	4	3	6	1
(Socialist Federal Republic of Yugoslavia) I Panajotović	6	5	6	4	5
(Denmark) J Leschly	4	7	3	6	7
(United Kingdom) W Knight	6	3	6	6
(Sweden) J-E Lundqvist	3	6	1	4
(Australia) R Hewitt	6	8	6
(United States) J Douglas	1	6	4

Third round
5	(United States) B MacKay	6	6	6
(Denmark) J Leschly	3	2	4
(United Kingdom) W Knight	6	7	6
(Australia) R Hewitt	3	5	3

Fourth round
5	(United States) B MacKay	6	8	10
(United Kingdom) W Knight	2	6	8

==== Section 3 ====
First round
3	(Italy) Nicola Pietrangeli	4	6	5	5
(United States) Butch Buchholz	6	3	7	7
(South Africa) Gordon Forbes	6	6	6
(Switzerland) Paul Blondel	3	0	1
(United States) Gardnar Mulloy	6	6	6
(Hungary) Antal Jancsó	3	3	2
(Australia) Neville Nette	11	3	8	4
(New Zealand) Lew Gerrard	9	6	10	6
(Spain) Juan Manuel Couder	4	6	6	2	6
(Australia) Warren Jacques	6	3	4	6	3
Q	(Australia) Alan Lane	5	2	6	0
(Sweden) Sven Davidson	7	6	1	6
(United States) Malcolm Fox	6	6	11	6
(Socialist Federal Republic of Yugoslavia) Sima Nikolić	4	2	13	1
(France) Jean-Claude Molinari	4	6	7	6
(China) Chu Chen Hua	6	3	5	4

Second round
(United States) E Buchholz	3	7	11	10
(South Africa) G Forbes	6	5	9	8
(United States) G Mulloy	6	7	6
(New Zealand) L Gerrard	3	5	4
(Spain) JM Couder	1	6	1	2
(Sweden) S Davidson	6	4	6	6
(United States) M Fox	3	6	3	2
(France) J-C Molinari	6	3	6	6

Third round
(United States) E Buchholz	4	5	4
(United States) G Mulloy	6	7	6
(Sweden) S Davidson	7	1	13	6	4
(France) J-C Molinari	9	6	11	4	6

Fourth round
(United States) G Mulloy	1	2	9	2
(France) J-C Molinari	6	6	7	6

==== Section 4 ====
First round
7	(Denmark) Kurt Nielsen	6	1	6	7
(Australia) Martin Mulligan	4	6	3	5
(West Germany) Wilhelm Bungert	4	2	6	3
(Australia) Rod Laver	6	6	4	6
(Brazil) José Edison Mandarino	2	6	6	6
Q	(Australia) Stan Hicks	6	4	2	4
(United Kingdom) Geoffrey Owen	3	5	7	2
Q	(United Kingdom) John Ward	6	7	5	6
(United Arab Republic) Jaroslav Drobný	12	6	8	6
(United Kingdom) Alan Mills	14	3	10	8
(United Kingdom) Oliver Prenn	6	6	6	6
(Chile) Patricio Rodríguez	3	8	2	3
(Netherlands) Willem Maris	6	6	6
Q	(United Kingdom) Dickie Dillon	1	3	2
(Australia) Bob Howe	10	6	9
(India) Premjit Lall	8	3	7

Second round
7	(Denmark) K Nielsen	8	4	5
(Australia) R Laver	10	6	7
(Brazil) JE Mandarino	4	4	6	0
Q	(United Kingdom) J Ward	6	6	3	6
(United Kingdom) A Mills	6	6	6
(United Kingdom) O Prenn	4	1	1
(Netherlands) W Maris	5	4	1
(Australia) R Howe	7	6	6

Third round
(Australia) R Laver	6	6	7
Q	(United Kingdom) J Ward	2	3	5
(United Kingdom) A Mills	9	6	7	6
(Australia) R Howe	11	4	5	2

Fourth round
(Australia) R Laver	6	3	6	6
(United Kingdom) A Mills	3	6	3	4

=== Bottom half ===
==== Section 5 ====
First round
(Italy) Giuseppe Merlo	6	2	6	6
(West Germany) Dieter Ecklebe	4	6	3	1
LL	(United Kingdom) Trevor Adamson	1	1	1
(United States) Jack Frost	6	6	6
(South Africa) Ray Weedon	3	4	4
(Denmark) Jørgen Ulrich	6	6	6
(Socialist Federal Republic of Yugoslavia) Milan Branović	4	1	1
(South Africa) Robin Sanders	6	6	6
(Netherlands) Pieter van Eijsden	3	6	4	3
(British Guiana) Ian McDonald	6	4	6	6
(Spain) Andrés Gimeno	7	11	8
(Sweden) Ulf Schmidt	5	9	6
(Socialist Federal Republic of Yugoslavia) Kamilo Keretić	3	4	1
(Australia) Frank Gorman	6	6	6
(Colombia) William Álvarez	4	3	3
8	(Australia) Roy Emerson	6	6	6

Second round
(Italy) G Merlo	0	0	3
(United States) J Frost	6	6	6
(Denmark) J Ulrich	6	6	6
(South Africa) R Sanders	2	3	2
(British Guiana) I McDonald	3	2	1
(Spain) A Gimeno	6	6	6
(Australia) F Gorman	1	6	6	3
8	(Australia) R Emerson	6	4	8	6

Third round
(United States) J Frost	7	5	1
(Denmark) J Ulrich	9	7	6
(Spain) A Gimeno	2	6	4	1
8	(Australia) R Emerson	6	3	6	6

Fourth round
(Denmark) J Ulrich	9	3	8	1
8	(Australia) R Emerson	7	6	10	6

==== Section 6 ====
First round
(Austria) Franz Hainka	4	6	2	2
(United States) Mike Franks	6	2	6	6
(France) Jean-Noël Grinda	6	6	6
(Soviet Union) Andrei Potanin	1	3	1
(United Kingdom) Malcolm Gracie	6	6	6
(Australia) Dennis Reilly	4	3	2
(Australia) Ken Fletcher	6	6	6
(Poland) Wiesław Gąsiorek	2	1	3
(Republic of Ireland) Joe Hackett	6	6	3	4
(United Kingdom) Colin Baxter	3	8	6	6
(Australia) Don Candy	6	6	6
(United States) Glenn Bassett	4	1	2
Q	(United Kingdom) Colin Hannam	2	4	5
(United Kingdom) Tony Pickard	6	6	7
(United Kingdom) Ivor Warwick	3	0	4
4	(United Kingdom) Bobby Wilson	6	6	6

Second round
(United States) M Franks	6	6	5	4	5
(France) J-N Grinda	3	3	7	6	7
(United Kingdom) M Gracie	2	1	0
(Australia) K Fletcher	6	6	6
(United Kingdom) C Baxter	3	2	2
(Australia) D Candy	6	6	6
(United Kingdom) A Pickard	3	6	4
4	(United Kingdom) R Wilson	6	8	6

Third round
(France) J-N Grinda	6	7	6
(Australia) K Fletcher	2	5	4
(Australia) D Candy	4	3	6	4
4	(United Kingdom) R Wilson	6	6	1	6

Fourth round
(France) J-N Grinda	3	15	1
4	(United Kingdom) R Wilson	6	17	6

==== Section 7 ====
First round
(United Kingdom) Gerry Oakley	6	7	6
(Canada) Paul Willey	3	5	3
(South Africa) John Hammill	6	2	4	10	3
(Sweden) Staffan Stockenberg	4	6	6	8	6
(Cuba) Orlando Garrido	6	5	5	2
(Federation of Rhodesia and Nyasaland) Adrian Bey	1	7	7	6
(Norway) Finn-Dag Jagge	2	4	8	6	6
(United Kingdom) Ralph Oliver	6	6	6	2	2
Q	(Soviet Union) Toomas Leius	3	4	5
(South Africa) Abe Segal	6	6	7
Q	(United Kingdom) Tony Clayton	2	1	3
(Belgium) Jacques Brichant	6	6	6
(Austria) Ladislav Legenstein	1	10	6	6	2
(United Kingdom) Geoffrey Paish	6	12	2	2	6
(Czechoslovakia) Jiří Javorský	3	0	3
6	(Chile) Luis Ayala	6	6	6

Second round
(United Kingdom) G Oakley	6	6	9
(Sweden) S Stockenberg	2	2	7
(Federation of Rhodesia and Nyasaland) A Bey	7	6	6
(Norway) F-D Jagge	5	2	2
(South Africa) A Segal	6	4	8	6
(Belgium) J Brichant	4	6	6	2
(United Kingdom) G Paish	3	1	4
6	(Chile) L Ayala	6	6	6

Third round
(United Kingdom) G Oakley	4	7	6	4
(Federation of Rhodesia and Nyasaland) A Bey	6	9	4	6
(South Africa) A Segal	3	10	4	2
6	(Chile) L Ayala	6	8	6	6

Fourth round
(Federation of Rhodesia and Nyasaland) A Bey	2	1	0
6	(Chile) L Ayala	6	6	6

==== Section 8 ====
First round
(United Kingdom) Mike Davies	6	6	6	6
(New Zealand) Brian Woolf	1	8	4	2
(Socialist Federal Republic of Yugoslavia) Boro Jovanović	6	6	6
(Hungary) István Gulyás	3	4	3
(Brazil) Ronnie Barnes	6	11	9	1	1
(China) Mei Fu Chi	3	9	11	6	6
(Denmark) Torben Ulrich	6	6	6	6
(Australia) Bob Mark	4	8	4	4
(India) Ramanathan Krishnan	6	6	6
(South Africa) Tim Heckler	3	1	0
(Australia) Barry Phillips-Moore	4	6	6	7
(Spain) José Luis Arilla	6	4	3	5
(South Africa) Rod Mandelstam	6	6	6
(Italy) Antonio Maggi	4	1	2
(Australia) Warren Woodcock	2	4	3
1	(United States) Alex Olmedo	6	6	6

Second round
(United Kingdom) M Davies	6	3	6	6
(Socialist Federal Republic of Yugoslavia) B Jovanović	1	6	3	2
(China) FC Mei	1	1	1
(Denmark) T Ulrich	6	6	6
(India) R Krishnan	6	6	6
(Australia) B Phillips-Moore	2	2	3
(South Africa) R Mandelstam	1	1	3
1	(United States) A Olmedo	6	6	6

Third round
(United Kingdom) M Davies	6	4	6	6	1
(Denmark) T Ulrich	3	6	8	1	6
(India) R Krishnan	4	6	4	5
1	(United States) A Olmedo	6	3	6	7

Fourth round
(Denmark) T Ulrich	3	3	2
1	(United States) A Olmedo	6	6	6

Preceded by 1959 French Championships	Grand Slams; Men's Singles	Succeeded by 1959 U.S. Championships
