= Malcolm Gracie =

British tennis player (1933–2023)

- Full name: James Malcolm Gracie
- Country (sports): (United Kingdom) Great Britain
- Born: April 1933
- Died: 24 July 2023

Singles

Grand Slam singles results
- Wimbledon: 2R (1959)

Doubles

Grand Slam doubles results
- Wimbledon: 1R (1952, 1953)

James Malcolm Gracie (April 1933 – 24 July 2023) was a British tennis player and administrator.

Gracie, a Manchester native, was active in tennis during the 1950s and 1960s, featuring in the Wimbledon singles main draw on five occasions. He won the singles title at the Scottish Championship in 1961 and represented Lancashire in inter–county fixtures. His tennis career was ended by a golf injury in 1967 which caused him to lose an eye.

A graduate of the University of Manchester, Gracie became a local practicing solicitor. He left the legal profession in 1983 when he got involved with a company that built and ran the Matchpoint sports centre in Bramhall. From 2000 to 2003, Gracie served as president of the Lawn Tennis Association.

Gracie was the father of tennis player Lorrayne Gracie.
