= Jelena Genčić =

Serbian tennis and handball player (1936–2013)

- Jelena Genčić
- Country (sports): Yugoslavia
- Born: 9 October 1936 Belgrade, Kingdom of Yugoslavia
- Died: 1 June 2013 (aged 76) Belgrade, Serbia

Grand Slam singles results
- Wimbledon: 1R (1959)

Grand Slam doubles results
- Wimbledon: 2R (1959)

Grand Slam mixed doubles results
- Wimbledon: 2R (1959, 1961)
Medal record
Women's Handball
Representing Yugoslavia
World Championships
Bronze medal – third place	1957 Yugoslavia	Team

Jelena Genčić (Serbian Cyrillic: Јелена Генчић, pronounced [jělena ɡěntʃitɕ]; 9 October 1936 – 1 June 2013) was a Serbian tennis and handball player and coach.

In the 1970s she became a junior tennis coach and was later credited for playing a major role in the early development of numerous future top class professional players and Grand Slam champions. Among the players she discovered and coached are Monica Seles, Novak Djokovic, Goran Ivanišević, Mima Jaušovec, Iva Majoli, and Tatjana Ječmenica. Genčić-coached players went on to collect 36 Grand Slam single titles: Djokovic 24, Seles 9, Ivanišević 1, Jaušovec 1, and Majoli 1.

== Early life and education ==
Born as one of seven children to Serbian father Jovan and Austrian mother Hermina, Jelena came from the prominent Genčić family in Serbia. Her grandfather Lazar Genčić studied medicine in Vienna, becoming one of Serbia's first surgeons in addition to setting up and running a military hospital while simultaneously holding the rank of a Royal Serbian Army general in World War I's Serbian campaign. Her great uncle Đorđe Genčić was the interior minister in the cabinet of Nikola Pašić and one of the chief conspirators of the May Coup.

She graduated with a degree in art history from the University of Belgrade's Faculty of Philosophy. She later obtained a second degree in psychology.

== Career ==
=== Sports ===
Genčić was a handball and tennis player, playing the two sports in parallel. She began pursuing tennis in 1948 at the age of eleven in the Fifth Mixed Experimental High School in Senjak. Before becoming the goalkeeper of the school's handball team, she tried to play football with the boys, but they often forced her to play in goal, and it was there that she discovered her goalkeeping potential. Genčić was soon invited to play the goalkeeper position at ŽRK Crvena zvezda, which she did in both outdoor and indoor versions of the sport. However, Jelena simultaneously played tennis for the rival club Partizan, which she joined in 1954. She equally invested herself in both sports and achieved success for both clubs.

Playing both sports simultaneously was sometimes a tough challenge; on one occasion in 1950, she was the goalkeeper in a friendly handball match with Austria in Graz, and the very next day the French Open started, so she took the train from Vienna to Paris by herself despite still being aged 13 at the time. In 1954, the 17-year-old competed at the Wimbledon in girls' singles, but lost in the first round due to having no experience playing on grass.

Meanwhile, in handball, Genčić became the goalkeeper of the Yugoslav women's national team, representing the country at the 1956 World Outdoor Handball Championship in West Germany and winning bronze at the inaugural 1957 World Championships held at home in Belgrade.

In 1963, at the age of 27, she quit handball, devoting herself fully to tennis. In addition to being a member of the Partizan tennis club, Genčić competed at various tournaments around the globe. At one time, she defined her tennis game as sharp and offensive, and she liked to make people "jump out of their seats" with it. Genčić played for Partizan from 1954 to 1976 and was the champion of Yugoslavia 20 times: two times in singles, in 1958 and 1964, six times in women's pairs, and twelve times in mixed pairs, while she was second 11 times. She played four Fed Cup matches for Yugoslavia in 1973.

Genčić's hobby was taking photos and in 1975 she had an exhibition of portraits of tennis players during the game.

=== Media ===
Genčić worked as television director at the state-owned television network TV Belgrade. Her work on television rarely overlapped with sports as she was mostly involved with producing arts-and-culture programmes dealing with the history of art in Serbia, classical music, and theater.

Genčić is especially proud of the series of shows on Serbian medieval miniature painting, because no one had done it before. She worked with the best TV directors, such as Miroslav Minja Dedić, Sava Mrmak, Slavoljub Stefanović Ravasi, and Zdravko Šotra. Genčić retired as a director at the end of the 1990s.

=== Tennis administration and coaching ===
In 1968, as tennis went professional with the beginning of its Open era, the 31-year-old Genčić, still very much an active player, began to be groomed for an eventual full-time tennis administrative career with a board position given to her at TK Partizan. Throughout the next few years, she became the president of the club and was effectively captain of the Yugoslav Tennis Association's juniors (TSJJ), and therefore traveled with the country's best youngsters.

Though already coaching on an informal basis, in 1976, after retiring from active play, Genčić became a full-time junior tennis coach, although she never took a test or exam that led to a Tennis-coaching qualification. Over the following 30 years she played a part in discovering and coaching Novak Djokovic, Monica Seles, Goran Ivanišević, Mima Jaušovec, Iva Majoli, and Tatjana Ječmenica.

In the early 1980s, as the captain of the TSJJ, she traveled with Seles and Ivanišević to several tournaments around Europe, including the 1985 European Under-14 championships in Heidelberg, where the 12-year-old Seles duly won, but Ivanišević was disqualified in the semifinals after behaving badly and breaking at least one racket. She found herself tested with the young Ivanišević, who at the time already was known as a wild child.

In late 1992, the president of Genex, a state-owned company that operated tourism in Yugoslavia, asked Genčić to be the director of a summer tennis camp that he wanted to run at its newly built complex in Kopaonik, a popular tourist destination in the mountains. After accepting the offer, Genčić herself organized the tennis camp made up of a group of young players from the TK Partizan, which lasted 9 weeks. On the very first morning, she met the six-year-old Novak Djokovic, whose parents worked in a pizzeria just across the road from the tennis courts, and she invited him to join them on the court after being impressed by his eagerness to play and by his "tennis bag that was so neatly packed it looked professional". Upon seeing the child Djokovic playing tennis, she stated: "This is the greatest talent I have seen since Monica Seles. His parents were former skiers but had no tennis background, so they asked experts whether Novak had sufficient potential and talent to pursue a tennis career and whether they should invest in it; ultimately it was Genčić who gave them those assurances. After the summer camp ended, the two began training together intensively at Belgrade’s Partizan Tennis Club.

Genčić worked with Djokovic over the following six years, teaching him the fundamentals of the sport and convincing him to hit his backhand with two hands instead of the single hand used by his idol, Pete Sampras. In their breaks, they read Pushkin's poetry or listened to Beethoven or Chopin. Whether she was training tennis or encouraging his interest in classical music, poetry, and languages, Genčić always tried to develop his mind as much as his tennis. Djokovic has credited Genčić for "shaping my mind as a human being, but also as a professional". During the Yugoslav Wars in the late 1990s, Genčić and Djokovic had to endure embargoes, which unabled him to travel for several junior tournaments, and NATO bombings, which constantly halted their training sessions. For instance, they had to change from training sites depending on where NATO forces had dropped bombs the previous night as she assumed that “they would not bomb the same area two days in a row”. Genčić's sister was killed when a bomb's shock wave hurled her against a wall. Due to his rapid development, Genčić realized that going abroad in search of an increased level of competition was the best option for Djokovic's future, so she contacted her friend and fellow countryman Nikola Pilić and in September 1999 the 12-year-old moved to the Pilić tennis academy in Oberschleißheim, Germany.

Genčić was also a great personal development coach. She encouraged Djokovic to visualize his shots while listening to classical music, such as Tchaikovsky's 1812 Overture, and her teachings about visualizing the results had a great impact on Djokovic's tennis career.

After retiring from TV at the end of the 1990s, she opened a tennis school in Banjica, where she organized several tournaments, one for each age bracket, from the youngest of the children to teenagers, and always awarded cups to the winners.

== Death and legacy ==
Genčić died on 1 June 2013, aged 76. She had been coaching until just days before her death from a heart attack. Djokovic's management team only revealed the news of Genčić's death after his third-round win at the 2013 French Open in Paris. Djokovic then tried to win the trophy not only to complete his first career grand slam, but to pay a tribute in her honor. Two days after breaking down in the locker room on being told of her death, he beat Philipp Kohlschreiber in four sets and wrote “Jeco Love You Forever” on the camera lens as he left the court. In his post-match interview, Djokovic stated: "Jelena was my first coach, like my second mother". He would lose in the semifinals to the eventual champion Rafael Nadal.

In 2016, former Serbian-Yugoslav handball player Dragica Đurić promoted the initiative to rename the Tašmajdan Stadium, which is part of the Tašmajdan Sports and Recreation Center, after Genčić due to her "legendary status in two sports that are closely related to the history of the Tašmajdan Stadium". Furthermore, the final match of the World Handball Championship in Belgrade in 1957, in which Genčić helped the Yugoslav team win bronze, had been held in the Tašmajdan Stadium. Although the Handball Federation of Serbia supported this initiative, the renaming never took place.

== Sources ==
- Bowers, Chris (2014). The Sporting Statesman - Novak Djokovic and the Rise of Serbia. London: Kings Road Publishing. ISBN 9781782197706.
