= Humphrey Truman =

British tennis player

- Country (sports): Great Britain
- Born: 5 August 1935

Singles

Grand Slam singles results
- Wimbledon: 1R (1961, 1962)

Doubles

Grand Slam doubles results
- Wimbledon: 3R (1956, 1963)

Grand Slam mixed doubles results
- Wimbledon: QF (1959)

Humphrey Truman (born 5 August 1935) is a British former tennis player.

Raised in Essex, Truman is the elder brother of tennis players Christine Truman and Nell Truman.

During the 1950s and 1960s he competed at Wimbledon, mostly as a doubles player. He made the mixed doubles quarter-finals of the 1959 Wimbledon Championships with sister Christine and featured in the singles main draw twice.

Truman, who was a pilot in the RAF, also played the sport of squash and appeared at the British Open.
