= 1959 Wimbledon Championships – Boys' singles =

Boys' singles
- 1959 Wimbledon Championships

Final
- Champion: (Soviet Union) Toomas Leius
- Runner-up: (Brazil) Ronnie Barnes
- Score: 6–2, 6–4

Events
Singles	men	women		boys	girls
Doubles	men	women	mixed	boys	girls
- Wimbledon Championships

Toomas Leius defeated Ronnie Barnes in the final, 6–2, 6–4 to win the boys' singles tennis title at the 1959 Wimbledon Championships.

== Draw ==
Key

- Q = Qualifier
- WC = Wild card
- LL = Lucky loser
- Alt = Alternate
- ITF = ITF entry
- PR = Protected ranking
- SR = Special ranking
- SE = Special exempt
- JE = Junior exempt
- JR = Junior Accelerator Programme entrant
- CO = College Accelerator Programme entrant
- NG = Next Gen Accelerator Program entrant
- w/o = Walkover
- r = Retired
- d = Defaulted

=== Finals ===
Semifinals
(Brazil) Ronnie Barnes
(India) Jaidip Mukerjea	w/o
(Soviet Union) Toomas Leius	8	10
(South Africa) Rod Mandelstam	6	8

Final
(Brazil) Ronnie Barnes	2	4
(Soviet Union) Toomas Leius	6	6

=== Top half ===
First round
(Spain) José Luis Arilla	6	6
(Canada) Keith Carpenter	1	0
(Switzerland) HP Girod	4	5
(United Kingdom) Roger Taylor	6	7
(Belgium) Claude De Gronckel	6	6
(Monaco) F Truchi	1	2
(Netherlands) Evert Schneider	1	2
(India) Jaidip Mukerjea	6	6

Second round
(Brazil) Ronnie Barnes	6	6
(Portugal) A Abreu	0	0
(France) François Jauffret	6	7
(Norway) Sverre Lie	1	5
(Spain) JL Arilla	6	6
(United Kingdom) R Taylor	4	4
(Belgium) C De Gronckel	2	1
(India) J Mukerjea	6	6

Quarterfinals
(Brazil) R Barnes	2	6	6
(France) J Jauffret	6	2	2
(Spain) JL Arilla	6	1	2
(India) J Mukerjea	4	6	6

Semifinals
(Brazil) R Barnes
(India) J Mukerjea	w/o

=== Bottom half ===
First round
(West Germany) Peter Bastian	7	6
(Republic of Ireland) John Murray	5	4
(Federation of Rhodesia and Nyasaland) Roger Dowdeswell	6	6
(Poland) W Joachimowski	4	3
(Denmark) Carl-Edvard Hedelund	2	4
(Soviet Union) Toomas Leius	6	6

Second round
(West Germany) P Bastian	5	6	6
(Federation of Rhodesia and Nyasaland) R Dowdeswell	7	3	1
(Soviet Union) T Leius	6	6
(China) Y Tai	3	2
(Austria) Detlev Herdy	6	6
(Jamaica) Peter Morais	2	4
(South Africa) Rod Mandelstam	6	6
(Peru) M Alegre	0	3

Quarterfinals
(West Germany) P Bastian	3	2
(Soviet Union) T Leius	6	6
(Austria) D Herdy	2	0
(South Africa) R Mandelstam	6	6

Semifinals
(Soviet Union) T Leius	8	10
(South Africa) R Mandelstam	6	8
