= 1959 Wimbledon Championships – Girls' singles =

Girls' singles
- 1959 Wimbledon Championships

Final
- Champion: (South Africa) Joan Cross
- Runner-up: (Austria) Doris Schuster
- Score: 6–1, 6–1

Details
- Draw: 12

Events
Singles	men	women		boys	girls
Doubles	men	women	mixed	boys	girls
← 1958 ·	Wimbledon Championships	· 1960 →

Joan Cross defeated Doris Schuster in the final, 6–1, 6–1 to win the girls' singles tennis title at the 1959 Wimbledon Championships.

== Draw ==
=== Key ===
- Q = Qualifier
- WC = Wild card
- LL = Lucky loser
- Alt = Alternate
- SE = Special exempt
- PR = Protected ranking
- ITF = ITF entry
- JE = Junior exempt
- w/o = Walkover
- r = Retired
- d = Defaulted
- SR = Special ranking

=== Draw ===
First round
(Denmark) S Westh	6	6
(Switzerland) M Berli	2	4
(Belgium) Micheline Ruquois	6	6
(Netherlands) Marjan Moritz	2	3
(Poland) E Nowopolska	0	0
(Austria) Doris Schuster	6	6
(India) D Appiah	6	7
(Norway) B Sønderaal	2	5

Quarterfinals
(South Africa) Joan Cross	6	6
(Republic of Ireland) J Atkinson	1	1
(Denmark) S Westh	2	6	6
(Belgium) Micheline Ruquois	6	4	4
(Austria) Doris Schuster	6	6
(India) D Appiah	4	2
(France) F Marsot	1	0
(United Kingdom) Carol Webb	6	6

Semifinals
(South Africa) Joan Cross	6	6
(Denmark) S Westh	1	0
(Austria) Doris Schuster	7	4	6
(United Kingdom) Carol Webb	5	6	3

Final
(South Africa) Joan Cross	6	6
(Austria) Doris Schuster	1	1
