= Juan Manuel Couder =

Spanish tennis player (1934–1999)

- Full name: Juan Manuel Couder Sánchez
- Country (sports): Spain
- Born: 23 October 1934; Valladolid, Spain
- Died: 18 May 1999 (aged 64); Madrid, Spain

Singles
- Career record: 312–174
- Career titles: 24

Grand Slam singles results
- French Open: 3R (1959, 1963, 1965, 1966)
- Wimbledon: 2R (1959, 1962)

Doubles

Grand Slam doubles results
- French Open: ?
- Wimbledon: QF (1959, 1960)

Team competitions
- Davis Cup: F (1965^{Ch})

Juan Manuel Couder Sánchez (23 October 1934 – 18 May 1999) was a Spanish tennis player.

Couder was an important player for Spain in the Davis Cup, in which he played 32 matches (17 singles and 15 doubles).

He won the Canadian Open in 1962.

He won the Spanish National Championships in 1965 over Juan Gisbert in the final.

His parents, Federico Couder Brizuela and Pilar Sánchez Huerta, were also tennis players.
