= Hazel Cheadle =

- Country (sports): United Kingdom
- Born: 8 November 1922
- Died: 8 March 1999 (aged 76)

Singles

Grand Slam singles results
- Wimbledon: 4R (1953)

Doubles

Grand Slam doubles results
- Wimbledon: 3R (1959)

Grand Slam mixed doubles results
- Wimbledon: 3R (1957, 1960)

Hazel Cheadle (née Austin; 8 November 1922 — 8 March 1999) was a British field hockey and tennis player.

Cheadle, raised in Hampshire, developed an interest in tennis while acting as a ball girl for her parents. Her father was headmaster of Milford School.

Based in Birmingham, Cheadle was a Warwickshire representative player and won the county singles title nine times in a row. She made the singles fourth round of the 1953 Wimbledon Championships.

During the 1960s she played international matches for the England national field hockey team.
