= Sima Nikolić =

- Country (sports): Yugoslavia
- Residence: Shreveport, Louisiana, U.S.
- Born: March 13, 1932 (age 93); Belgrade, Kingdom of Yugoslavia

Singles

Grand Slam singles results
- Wimbledon: 2R (1953)

Doubles

Grand Slam doubles results
- Wimbledon: 1R (1958, 1959, 1962)

Grand Slam mixed doubles results
- Wimbledon: 2R (1957, 1959, 1961)

Sima Nikolić (born March 13, 1932) is a former tennis player who competed for former Yugoslavia.

Nikolić lost in the second round of the Wimbledon in singles in 1953 to Hugh Stewart. Nikolic lost in the first round of the Wimbledon in singles in 1954.
