= Ladislav Legenstein =

Austrian tennis player

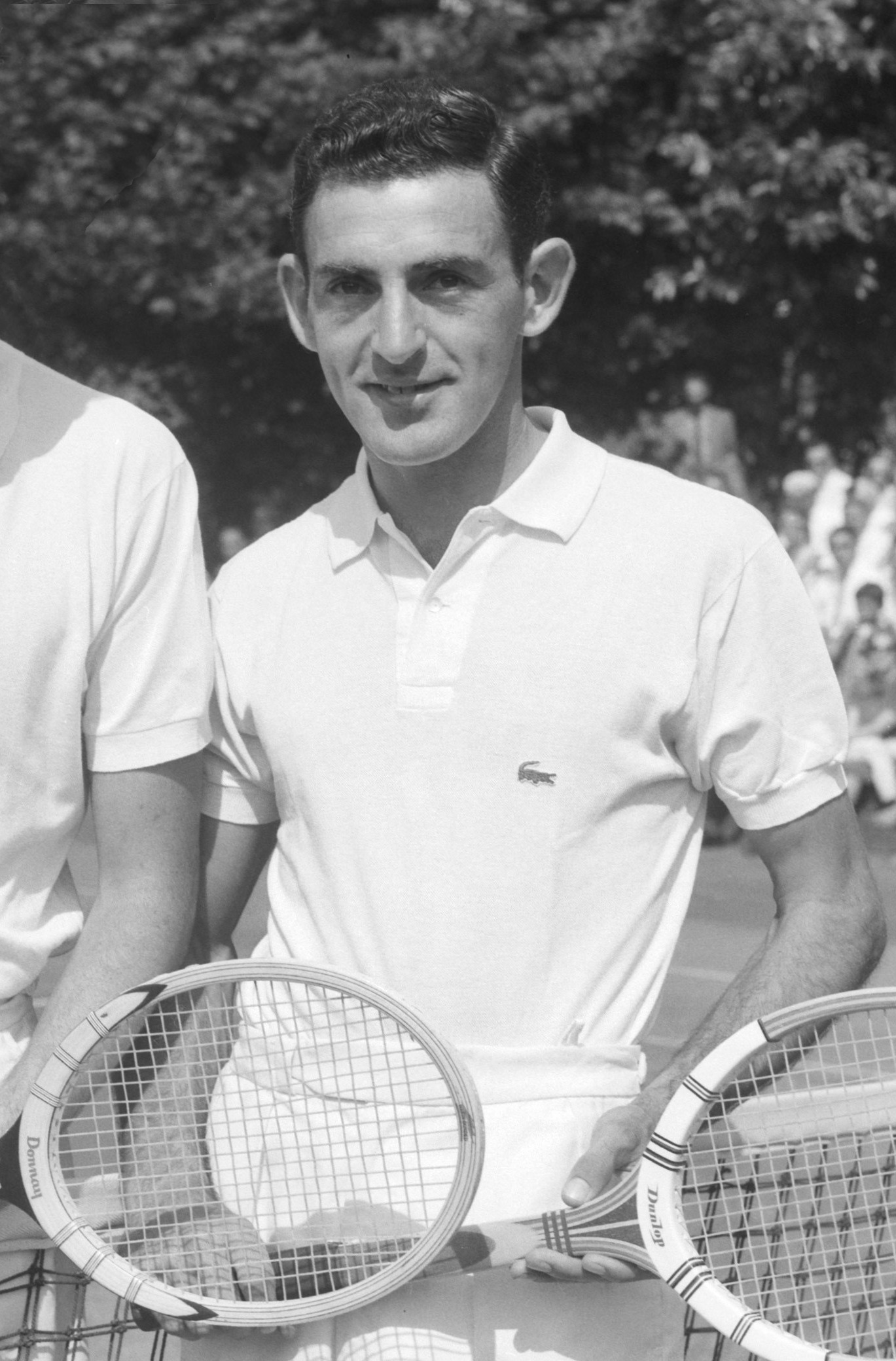
- Ladislav Legenstein in 1959
- Country (sports): Austria
- Born: 19 November 1926 (age 99) Čakovec, Kingdom of Serbs, Croats, and Slovenes
- Turned pro: 1950 (amateur tour)
- Retired: 1975 (played pro event same year)
- Plays: Right-handed (one-handed backhand)

Singles
- Career record: 223–162
- Career titles: 13

Grand Slam singles results
- French Open: 4R (1959)
- Wimbledon: 1R (1959, 1960, 1961, 1962, 1963)
- US Open: 2R (1960)

Doubles

Grand Slam doubles results
- Wimbledon: SF (1959)

Grand Slam mixed doubles results
- Wimbledon: 2R (1961)

Ladislav "Laci" Legenstein (born 19 November 1926) is a Croatian–born Austrian former tennis player. He was active from 1950 to 1975 and won 13 career singles titles.

== Early years ==
He was born in Čakovec, Kingdom of Serbs, Croats, and Slovenes (now Croatia). Both his parents were successful table tennis players and Ladislav also practised this sport in his youth, followed by football and volleyball (OK Mladost Čakovec). He started playing tennis on a court near his school and focused on this sport when he went to study in Zagreb. In 1955 he left Yugoslavia.

== Tennis career ==
His best singles performance at a Grand Slam event was reaching the fourth round at the 1959 French Championships. In the third round he defeated 20-year-old Rod Laver in five sets but lost in the next round in straight sets to Ian Vermaak. Legenstein participated in five Wimbledon Championships but never made it past the first round in the singles event. Together with Torben Ulrich he reached the semifinal of the 1959 Wimbledon Championships doubles event in which they lost in straight sets to first–seeded and eventual champions Roy Emerson and Neale Fraser.

In July 1956 Legenstein was the finalist at the singles event of the international tennis tournament in Travemünde, West Germany. In the final Ken Rosewall proved too strong, defeating him in three sets. In 1957 Legenstein became the singles champion at the inaugural International Dutch Championships, played at 't Melkhuisje in Hilversum. As a stateless player he defeated Fred Dehnert in the final with the loss of only two games. He also won the mixed doubles event with Mrs. Blaise. In 1958 he won the doubles title with Vladimir Petrovic and successfully defended the mixed doubles title with Mrs. Blaise. In 1959 he again reached the singles final but this time lost in straight sets to Jacques Brichant. In August 1959 he was runner–up at the Austrian Championships, losing in the final in straight sets to Budge Patty.

In April 1960 Legenstein gained the Austrian citizenship which was granted due to the ancestry of his father. In September 1960 he won the singles and doubles title at the Canadian Championships. In the singles he defeated Warren Woodcock in the final in straight sets and in the doubles he teamed up with Peter Scholl and won the final against Woodcock and Whitney Reed in straight sets. Legenstein played in six ties for the Austria Davis Cup team from 1960 through 1962 and reached the second round of the Europe zone during these years. He has a Davis Cup record of nine wins and six losses.

From 1964 to 1974 he worked as a tennis coach at the Heidelberger Tennisclub. Legenstein played on the seniors tour and became the singles and doubles champion in the 75+ category at the 2001 ITF Super-Seniors World Individual Championships . He continued to play senior tournaments until 2010 when, aged 83, he participated in the 34th Int. European Tennis Championships for Seniors.

== Career finals ==
=== Singles (13–5) ===
(incomplete list)

Result	No.	Date	Tournament	Surface	Opponent	Score
Win	1.	1956	Bad Herrenalb International	Clay	(West Germany) Klaus Meya	14–16, 6–2, 6–2
Win	2.	1956	Ingolstadt International	Clay	(Socialist Federal Republic of Yugoslavia) Milan Branović	6–2, 6–4, 1–6, 3–6, 10–8
Win	3.	1956	Bielefeld International	Clay	(West Germany) Engelbert Koch	6–1, 2–6, 6–4, 6–1
Loss	1.	1956	Travemünde International	Clay	(Australia) Ken Rosewall	6–8, 6–3, 0–6
Win	4.	1957	Dutch International Championships	Clay	(Netherlands) Fred Dehnert	6–1, 6–1
Win	5.	1957	Hannover International	Clay	(Socialist Federal Republic of Yugoslavia) Milan Branović	6–4, 6–4, 6–4
Win	6.	1957	Bielefeld International	Clay	(West Germany) Franz Feldbausch	6–3, 6–4, 6–1
Win	7.	1957	Madrid Cup	Clay	(Spain) Andrés Gimeno	8–6, 0–6, 6–1, 6–8, 7–5
Win	8.	1958	Lübeck International	Clay	(West Germany) Rupert Huber	6–3, 10–8
Loss	2.	1959	Dutch International Championships	Clay	(Belgium) Jacques Brichant	2–6, 6–2, 2–6
Win	9.	1959	Bochum International	Clay	(Australia) Barry Phillips-Moore	7–5, 7–5
Loss	3.	1959	Austrian International Championships	Clay	(United States) Budge Patty	6–8, 1–6, 2–6
Win	10.	1960	Canadian International Championships	Clay	(Australia) Warren Woodcock	6–2, 6–2, 7–5
Win	11.	1961	Championships of Freiburg	Clay	(West Germany) Wilhelm Bungert	6–3, 6–4
Win	12.	1966	Swiss Pro Indoors	Wood (i)	(France) Robert Haillet	6–3, 6–4
Loss	4.	1972	Bermuda International Championships	Clay	(United States) Jim Hanlon	3–6, 4–6
Loss	5.	1974	Bermuda International Championships	Clay	(United States) Claude Schoenlank	3–6, 4–6
