= Allan Kendall =

Australian broadcaster and tennis player

- Full name: Allan Crawford Kendall
- Country (sports): Australia
- Born: 29 September 1928 Orange, New South Wales
- Died: 17 December 2013 (aged 85) Sydney, New South Wales

Grand Slam singles results
- Australian Open: 2R (1950)
- French Open: 2R (1959)
- Wimbledon: 2R (1959)

Allan Crawford Kendall (29 September 1928 — 17 December 2013) was an Australian broadcaster and tennis player.

== Biography ==
=== Early life ===
Kendall, born in the New South Wales town of Orange, was a nephew of tennis player Jack Crawford. His father, Victor, ended up running a tennis club in Albury where the then Margaret Smith (Court) trained.

=== Sporting career ===
Attending Scots College in Sydney from 1943, Kendall was the 1946 NSW schoolboys singles champion. He was a junior doubles champion at the Australian Championships with Rex Hartwig in 1947.

Kendall received blues in lawn tennis, squash and table tennis while studying at the University of Sydney.

During the 1950s and 1960s he competed on the international tennis tour.

=== Broadcasting ===
Kendall, who got involved in the arts during university, founded the Australian version of BBC children's television show Play School. He got the idea after a visit to England at the BBC studios in 1964 and retired from tennis to begin working for the ABC. When the show premiered on the ABC in 1966 he was the inaugural producer.
