= Malcolm Fox (tennis) =

American tennis player (1928–2004)

- Full name: Malcolm Ira Fox
- Country (sports): United States
- Born: May 8, 1928 Baltimore, Maryland, U.S.
- Died: April 1, 2004 (aged 75)

Singles

Grand Slam singles results
- French Open: 2R (1954, 1956)
- Wimbledon: 2R (1955, 1958, 1959, 1960, 1961, 1962)
- US Open: 2R (1951)

Doubles

Grand Slam doubles results
- Wimbledon: 2R (1954, 1958)

Mixed doubles

Grand Slam mixed doubles results
- Wimbledon: 2R (1953, 1959)

Malcolm Ira Fox (May 8, 1928 – April 21, 2004) was an American tennis player who competed in the mid-20th century and lost the final of the 1954 Austrian International Championships to Kurt Nielsen.

== Biography ==
Malcom Ira Fox was born in Baltimore, Maryland, on May 8, 1928.

From 1950 to 1952, he enlisted in the U.S. Army and spent nine months serving in the infantry in Korea. The following year, he traveled to Europe to play various tennis tournaments in Italy, Belgium, France, Sweden, and England. Some of his best results include reaching the last 16 of the 1954 Monte Carlo Championships and the quarterfinals at both the 1954 Torneo Godó and the 1955 Swiss International Championships. He also reached the semifinals of the 1956 Internationales Weissenhofturnier in Stuttgart, losing to Jack Arkinstall, who ultimately won the title.

Fox died on April 21, 2004, at the age of 75.
