= Adrian Bey =

Rhodesian-born American tennis player

- Country (sports): Rhodesia
- Born: May 16, 1938 Salisbury, Rhodesia
- Died: July 2, 2019 (aged 81) Texas, United States
- Plays: Right-handed

Singles
- Career record: 84-71
- Career titles: 6

Grand Slam singles results
- French Open: 2R (1963)
- Wimbledon: 4R (1959, 1963)
- US Open: 3R (1961)

Adrian Bey (May 16, 1938 – July 2, 2019) was a Rhodesian-born American professional tennis player.

Bey was born and raised in Salisbury, Rhodesia, and attended Prince Edward School.

Debuting on the international tour in the late 1950s, Bey was a member of the inaugural Rhodesia Davis Cup team and featured in a total of five ties in the competition. Bey won eight closed championships in Rhodesia and was the country's 1963 Sportsman of the Year.

In 1960, Bey won the Worcestershire Championships on grass at Malvern, defeating Alan Mills in the semifinal and Reynaldo Garrido in a close final. He twice made the round of 16 at the Wimbledon Championships, including in 1963 when he was beaten in four sets by second-seed Manuel Santana.

In 1965, Bey won the Rhodesian International Championships defeating Gordon Forbes in the final in a close five set match.

In the 1970s he immigrated to the United States and worked in Texas as a tennis pro for many years, living there until his death in 2019. He was a 2010 inductee in the Texas Tennis Hall of Fame.

== See also ==
- List of Rhodesia Davis Cup team representatives
