= Ruia Morrison =

New Zealand tennis player (born 1936)

Dame Ruia Morrison DNZM MBE
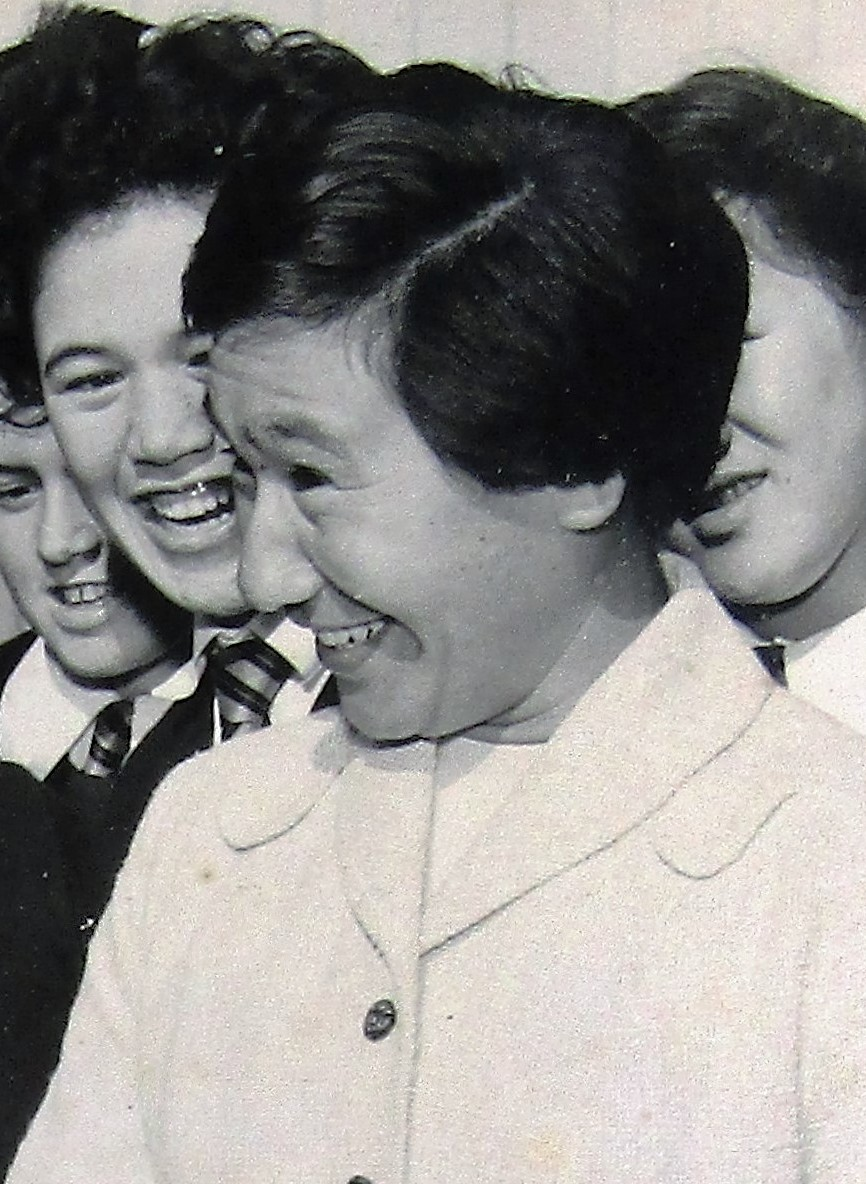
- Morrison in early 1960s
- Born: Ruia Mereana Morrison; 8 May 1936 (age 90); Tikitere, New Zealand
- Tennis career
- Country (sports): New Zealand

Dame Ruia Mereana Morrison DNZM MBE (born 8 May 1936) is a retired New Zealand tennis player. Morrison was the first New Zealand woman and the first Māori person to play at Wimbledon and reached the fourth round in both 1957 and 1959. She also won 13 national New Zealand tennis titles.

== Early life ==
Morrison was born in 1936 at Tikitere, a small farming community between Lake Rotoiti and Rotorua in New Zealand's North Island. She was the third of nine children born to Hingawaka (Waki) Morrison and Tanira Kingi. She is Māori from the Te Arawa and Ngāti Tūwharetoa iwi (tribes).

In 1944, the family moved from Tikitere to live in Te Koutu, Rotorua. Shortly afterwards, Hingawaka Morrison, a rugby and tennis player, built two tennis courts in the community. Morrison, aged 8 years old, wanted to play on the courts but as she was so young her father made her a wooden bat and coached her while she practised on the walls of their house instead.

Morrison attended Rotokawa and Rotorua Primary Schools, Rotorua High School, and Te Puke High School. In 1953 Aucklander Mrs Mowbray saw her playing tennis in Rotorua and invited her to stay with her in Auckland; Morrison moved to the city and boarded with Mowbray while having her first formal tennis lessons, at the Eden-Epsom Tennis Club. Hoani Waititi, a teacher at St. Stephen's School, saw Morrison playing and approached St. Stephen's sister school, Queen Victoria School for Maori Girls, and made arrangements for her to enrol as a boarder and receive tennis coaching. After finishing high school, Morrison attended Auckland Teachers' College, where she continued to play tennis and also began a long tennis partnership with Heather Robson.

== Adult life ==
Morrison won the national singles title in 1956 and it became clear that for her to make progress in tennis she would need to compete overseas. Waititi formed a fundraising campaign to help Morrison travel to England to compete at Wimbledon. The campaign was successful, raising more than enough for the trip, and Morrison and Robson left New Zealand in 1957 for England.

At Wimbledon, Morrison reached the fourth round, beating Billie Woodgate, J.L. Debford and Sheila Armstrong and then losing to American player Betty Pratt, ranked fourth in the world. Pratt invited Morrison, along with the Wimbledon champions Althea Gibson and Maria Bueno, to the Caribbean the following year for international tennis tournaments at Montego Bay, Jamaica, and San Juan, Puerto Rico.

In 1958, Morrison reached the third round of Wimbledon. In 1959, she competed at the British Hard Court championships, losing to Christine Truman in the quarterfinals. She won the Guildford Championships by beating South Africa’s Joan Cross, and the mixed doubles with Mexican Gustavo Palafox as her partner. The same year, Morrison and Pat Nettleton reached the third round of the ladies' doubles at Wimbledon and Morrison made the fourth round of the mixed doubles with Brian Woolf from New Zealand. In the Wimbledon singles, Morrison reached the fourth round, losing to the eventual champion Maria Bueno.

In later years, Morrison won the New Zealand national singles title an additional five times and the national doubles title several times as well. In 1961, Morrison donated the excess money from the 1956 fundraising campaign to the Maori Education Board rather than travelling to Wimbledon again. Despite not competing internationally that year, she still won the national singles and doubles titles in 1962.

In 1959 and 1960, Morrison entered the W.D. & H.O. Wills tournament in Auckland, winning the women's title in both years; in 1960 she won the doubles and mixed doubles. In 1965, Morrison and Elizabeth Terry were selected to travel to Melbourne to compete in the Federation Cup. They beat Argentina but lost to Australia.

When Morrison retired from international tennis she donated her remaining winnings to the Maori Education Board a charitable foundation which Waititi had founded to support Māori achievers.

=== Recognition ===
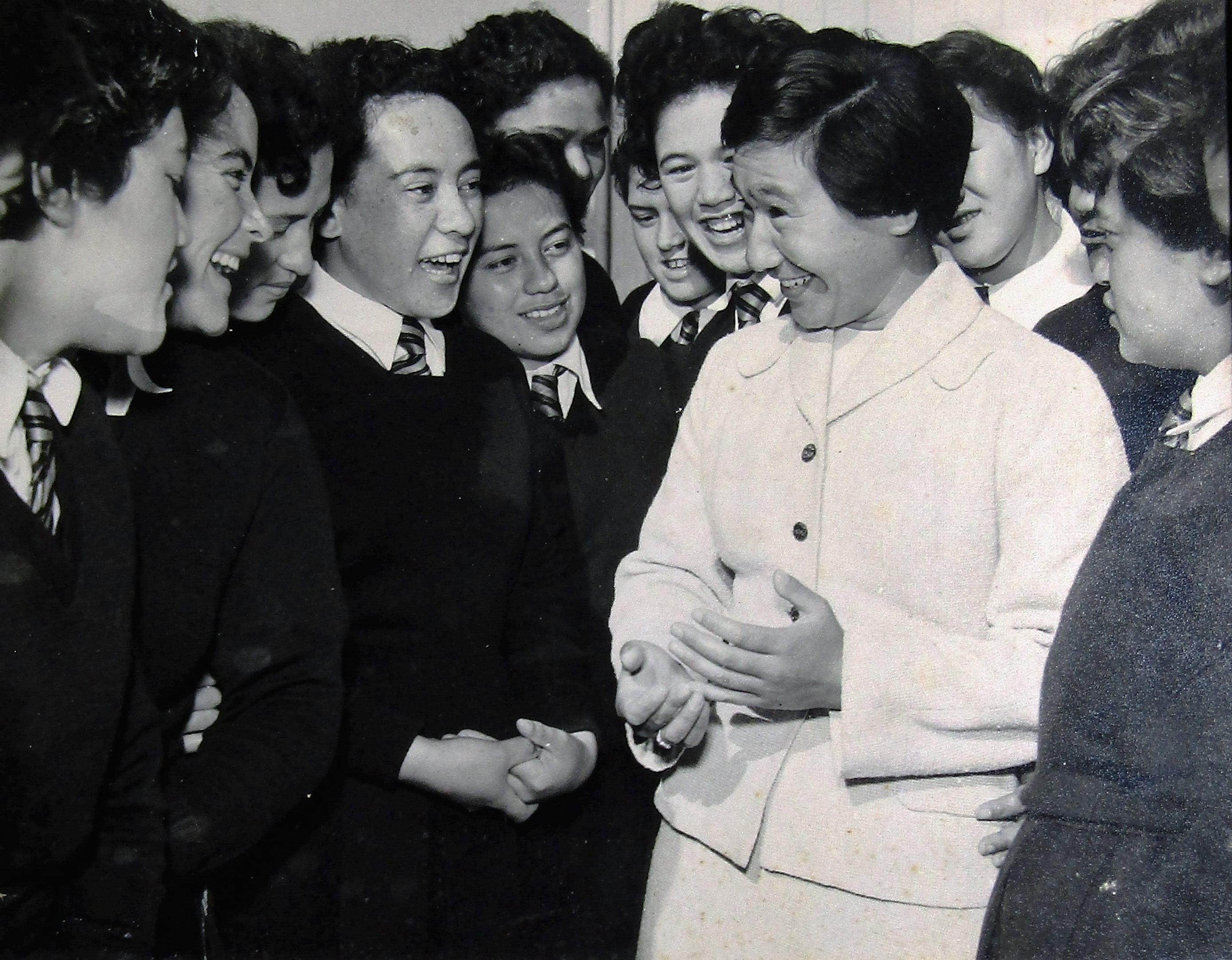
Ruia Morrison visiting Queen Victoria School for Māori Girls circa 1960s

In the 1960 New Year Honours, Morrison was appointed a Member of the Order of the British Empire for services in the field of sport, especially tennis. In 2001, Morrison was awarded life membership of the Aotearoa Māori Tennis Association, and in 2003, she was inducted into the Māori Sports Hall of Fame. In 2014, she was made a Tennis New Zealand life member.

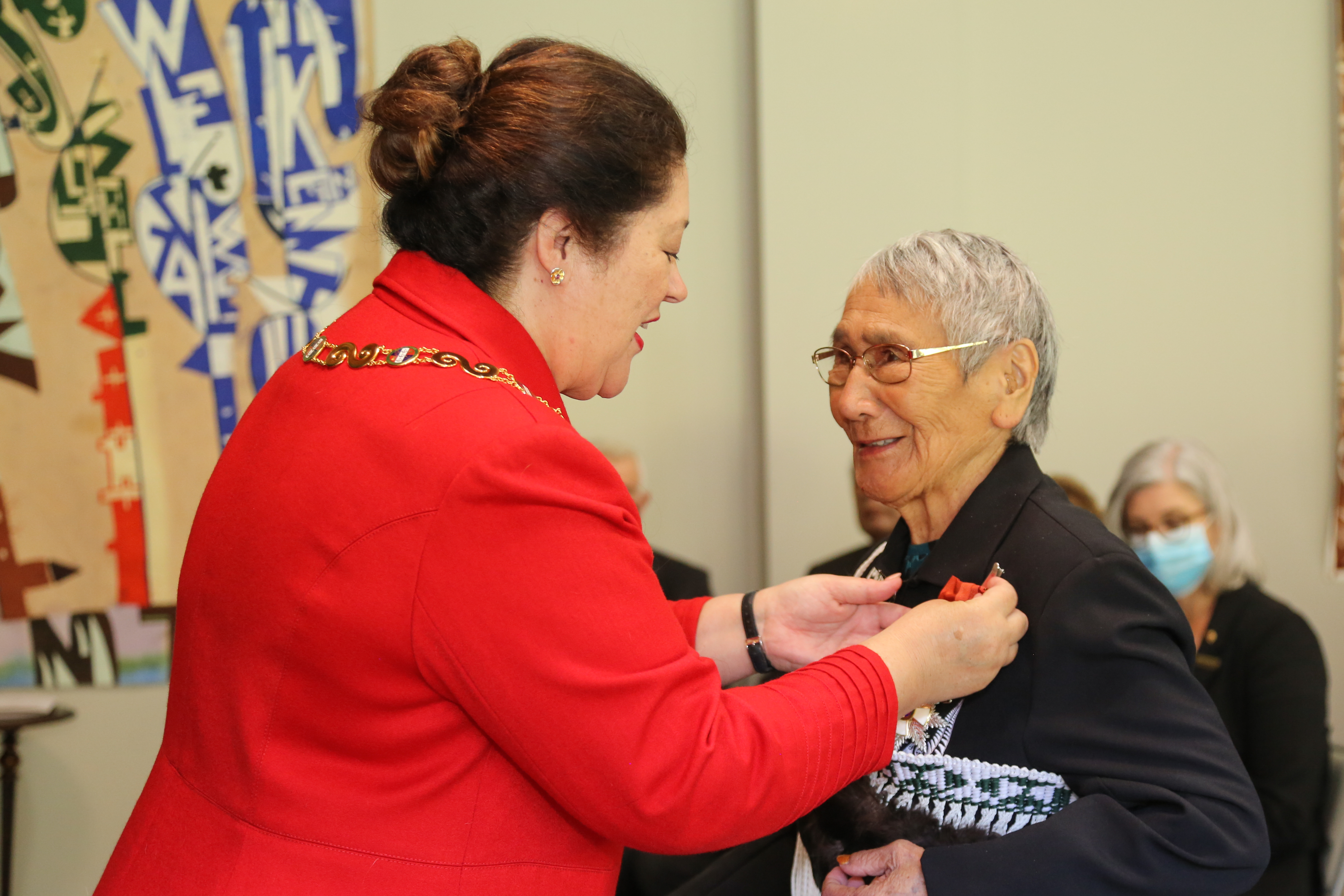
Morrison's investiture as a Dame Companion of the New Zealand Order of Merit by the governor-general, Dame Cindy Kiro, at Government House, Auckland, on 27 May 2022

In the 2021 Queen's Birthday Honours, Morrison was appointed a Dame Companion of the New Zealand Order of Merit, for services to tennis.

== Legacy ==
In 2011, Aotearoa Maori Tennis President Dick Garratt began researching Morrison's life in preparation for the publication of the biography Tikitere to Wimbledon & the World – Ruia Morrison.
