= Willem Maris (tennis) =

Dutch businessman, engineer and tennis player

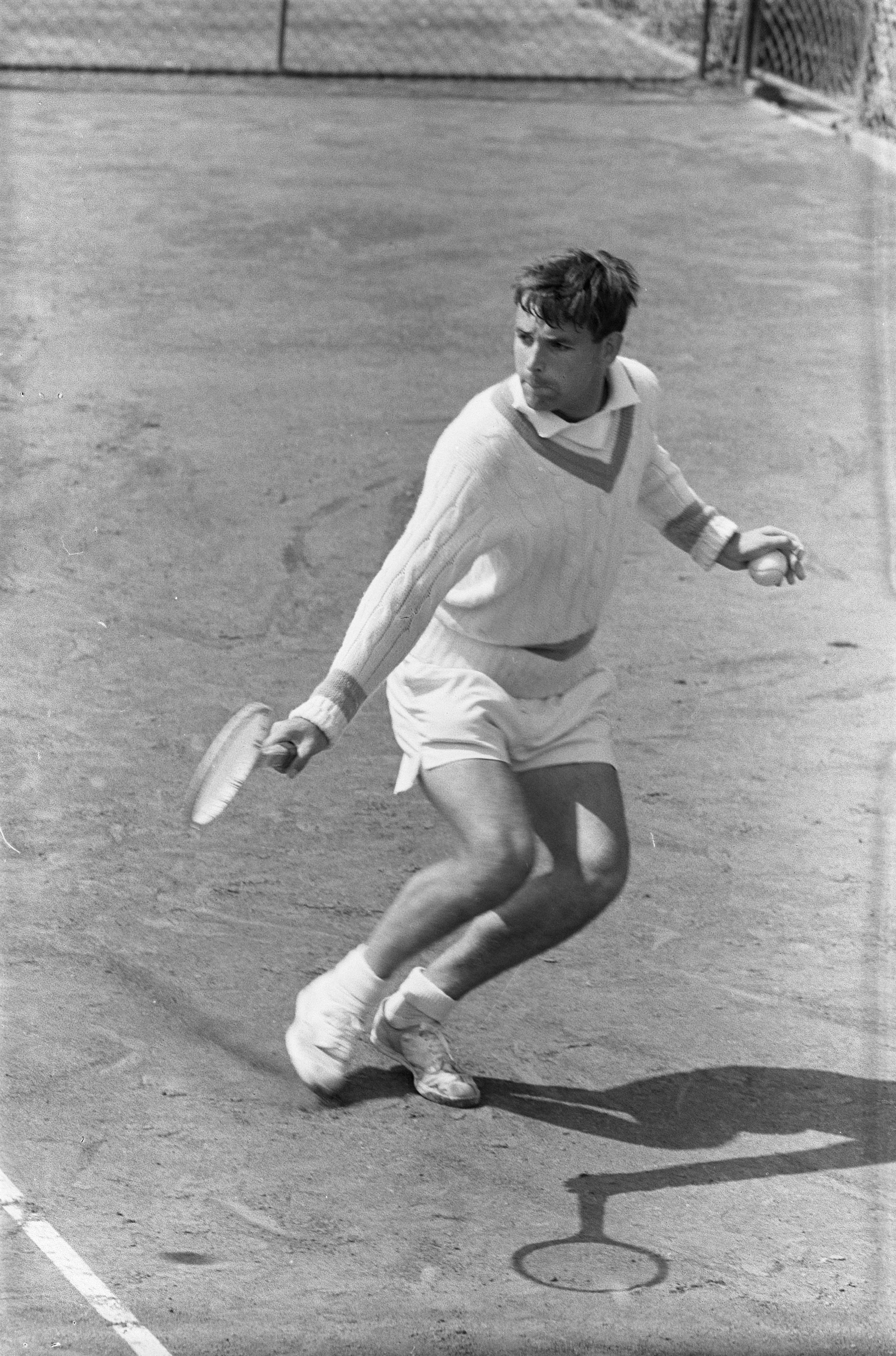
- Country (sports): Netherlands
- Born: 14 September 1939 Utrecht, Netherlands
- Died: 13 December 2010 (aged 71)
- Plays: Right-handed

Grand Slam singles results
- French Open: 2R (1959)
- Wimbledon: 2R (1959, 1960)

Willem Maris (14 September 1939 – 13 December 2010) was a Dutch businessman, engineer and tennis player.

Born in Utrecht, Maris was the Dutch national champion in 1958 and 1962. He played in the Davis Cup for the Netherlands from 1958 to 1963 and twice made the singles second round of the Wimbledon Championships.

Maris was CEO of Dutch multinational ASML through the 1990s.

== See also ==
- List of Netherlands Davis Cup team representatives
