= Janet Hopps Adkisson =

American tennis player

Janet Hopps
- Full name: Janet Hopps Adkisson
- Country (sports): United States
- Born: August 4, 1934 (age 91) Berkeley, California, US
- Height: 5 ft 6 in (168 cm)

Singles
- Highest ranking: No. 5 US

Grand Slam singles results
- French Open: 3R (1959)
- Wimbledon: 4R (1959, 1960)
- US Open: 3R (1957, 1960)

Doubles

Grand Slam doubles results
- French Open: QF (1959)
- Wimbledon: SF (1960)

Grand Slam mixed doubles results
- Wimbledon: SF (1960)
- US Open: F (1959)

Team competitions

Janet Hopps Adkisson (born August 4, 1934) is a former professional tennis player from the U.S. Adkisson was ranked in the top 15 female tennis players three times, and was, according to the State of Washington Sports Hall of Fame, "once recognized as one of the world's top woman tennis players".

Her best singles performance at a Grand Slam tournament was reaching the fourth round at the Wimbledon Championships in 1959 and 1960 which she lost to Sally Moore and Renée Schuurman respectively. Her best singles title was in South America, Barinquilla, Columbia(1958). Defeated Althea Gibson #1 in World and Maria Bueno.

She reached the final of the mixed doubles event at the 1959 U.S. Championships, teaming up with Bob Mark, in which they were defeated in three sets by Margaret Osborne and Neale Fraser. With Karen Hantze she reached the semifinal of the doubles event at the 1960 Wimbledon Championships which they lost in three sets to the first-seeded pair, and eventual champions, Maria Bueno and Darlene Hard. At the same tournament, Hopps Adkisson partnered Bob Mark to reach the semifinal of the mixed doubles event.

Hopps Adkisson won the singles and doubles title at the US Indoor Championships in 1961 and the mixed doubles title with tennis commentator and author Bud Collins.

Hopps Adkisson was inducted into the State of Washington Sports Hall of Fame in 1998 and the ITA Women's Collegiate Tennis Hall of Fame in 1999.

== Grand Slam finals ==
=== Mixed Doubles: (1 runner-ups) ===
Result	Year	Championship	Surface	Partner	Opponents	Score
Loss	1959	U.S. Championships	Grass	(Australia) Bob Mark	(United States) Margaret Osborne (Australia) Neale Fraser	5–7, 15–13, 2–6
