= 1959 Wimbledon Championships =

- Date: 22 June – 4 July
- Edition: 73rd
- Category: Grand Slam
- Surface: Grass
- Location: Church Road; SW19, Wimbledon, London, United Kingdom
- Venue: All England Lawn Tennis and Croquet Club

Champions

Men's singles
- (United States) Alex Olmedo

Women's singles
- (Brazil) Maria Bueno

Men's doubles
- (Australia) Roy Emerson / (Australia) Neale Fraser

Women's doubles
- (United States) Jeanne Arth / (United States) Darlene Hard

Mixed doubles
- (Australia) Rod Laver / (United States) Darlene Hard

Boys' singles
- (Soviet Union) Toomas Leius

Girls' singles
- (South Africa) Joan Cross
← 1958 ·	Wimbledon Championships	· 1960 →

The 1959 Wimbledon Championships took place on the outdoor grass courts at the All England Lawn Tennis and Croquet Club in Wimbledon, London, United Kingdom. The tournament was held from Monday 22 June until Saturday 4 July 1959. It was the 73rd staging of the Wimbledon Championships, and the third Grand Slam tennis event of 1959.

== Champions ==
=== Seniors ===
==== Men's singles ====
(United States) Alex Olmedo defeated (Australia) Rod Laver, 6–4, 6–3, 6–4

==== Women's singles ====
(Brazil) Maria Bueno defeated (United States) Darlene Hard, 6–4, 6–3

==== Men's doubles ====
(Australia) Roy Emerson / (Australia) Neale Fraser defeated (Australia) Rod Laver / (Australia) Bob Mark, 8–6, 6–3, 14–16, 9–7

==== Women's doubles ====
(United States) Jeanne Arth / (United States) Darlene Hard defeated (United States) Beverly Fleitz / (United Kingdom) Christine Truman, 2–6, 6–2, 6–3

==== Mixed doubles ====
(Australia) Rod Laver / (United States) Darlene Hard defeated (Australia) Neale Fraser / (Brazil) Maria Bueno, 6–4, 6–3

=== Juniors ===
==== Boys' singles ====
(Soviet Union) Toomas Leius defeated (Brazil) Ronnie Barnes, 6–2, 6–4

==== Girls' singles ====
(South Africa) Joan Cross defeated (Austria) Doris Schuster, 6–1, 6–1

Preceded by 1959 French Championships	Grand Slams	Succeeded by 1959 U.S. National Championships
