= Norma Marsh =

Australian tennis player

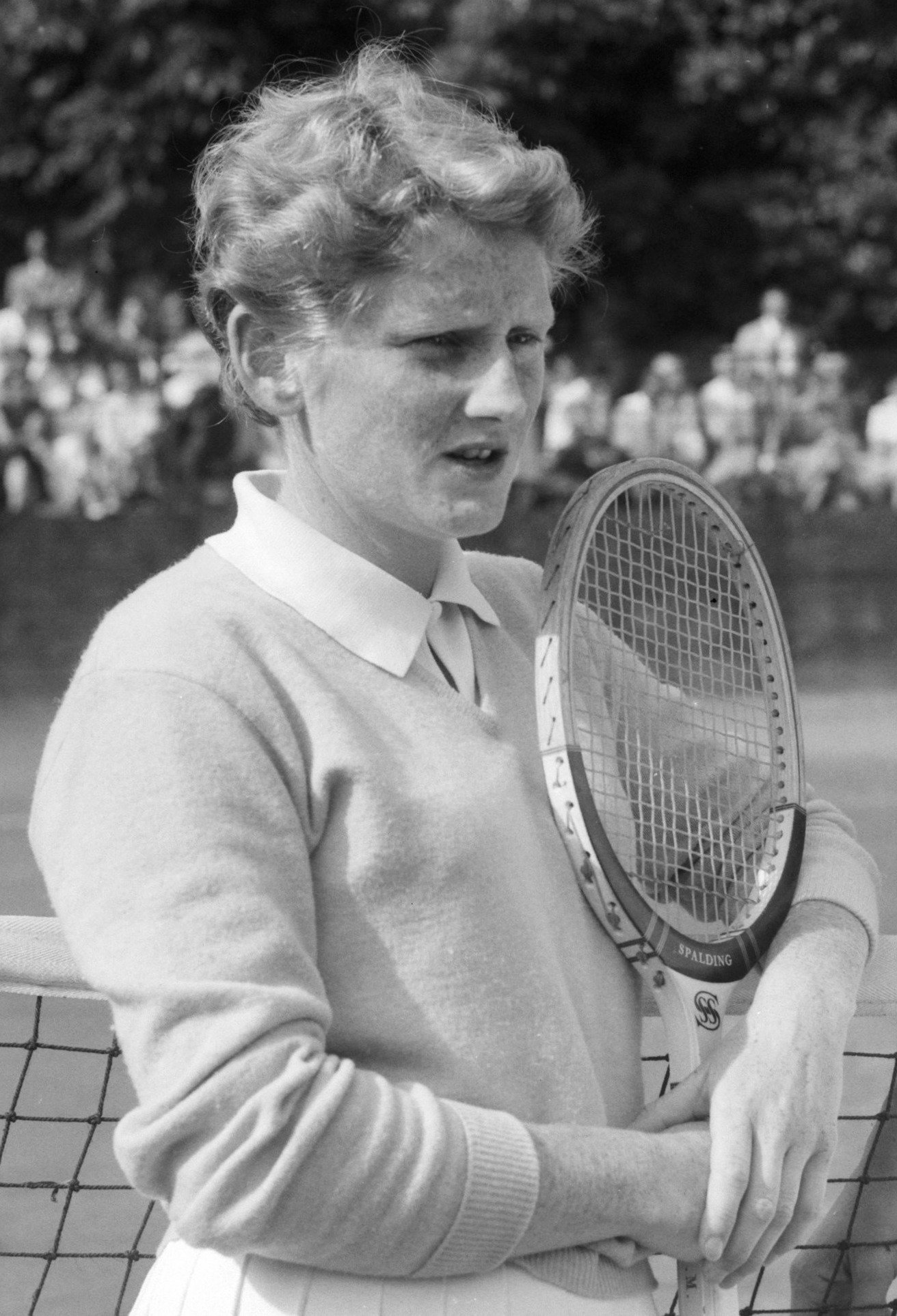
- Marsh in 1959
- Country (sports): Australia
- Born: 13 January 1936 (age 90)

Singles
- Career record: 10–9
- Career titles: 0 WTA, 0 ITF

Grand Slam singles results
- Australian Open: QF (1962, 1971)
- Wimbledon: 4T (1959)

Doubles
- Career record: 5–7
- Career titles: 0 WTA, 0 ITF

Grand Slam doubles results
- Australian Open: SF (1958)

Grand Slam mixed doubles results
- Australian Open: 2T (1958, 1962, 1966)

Norma Marsh (born 13 January 1936) is an Australian retired tennis player. At the Australian Championships, she reached the semifinals in 1958 (doubles) and the quarterfinals in 1962 and 1971 (singles). She was ranked No. 9 in Australia in 1962.

In 1959, she won the singles title at the Dutch Open Championships.
