= Jeanne Arth =

American tennis player

- Country (sports): United States
- Born: July 21, 1935 (age 90); Saint Paul, Minnesota, United States
- Plays: Right-handed

Singles

Grand Slam singles results
- French Open: 2R (1959)
- Wimbledon: 2R (1959)
- US Open: SF (1958)

Doubles

Grand Slam doubles results
- French Open: 3R (1959)
- Wimbledon: W (1959)
- US Open: W (1958, 1959)

Grand Slam mixed doubles results
- US Open: QF (1971)

Jeanne Arth (born July 21, 1935) is an American tennis player who won women's doubles titles at the Wimbledon Championships and the U.S. National Championships.

Arth graduated from Central High School in Saint Paul, Minnesota in 1952 and attended the College of St. Catherine. Arth and her partner Darlene Hard won women's doubles titles at the U.S. National Championships in 1958 and 1959 and at the Wimbledon Championships in 1959.

Arth received the Lions Club outstanding athlete award in 1958 and was inducted into the Saint Paul Central Athletic Hall of Fame in 1995.

== Grand Slam finals ==
=== Doubles (3 titles) ===
Result	Year	Championship	Surface	Partner	Opponents	Score
Win	1958	U.S. National Championships	Grass	(United States) Darlene Hard	(United States) Althea Gibson (Brazil) Maria Bueno	2–6, 6–3, 6–4
Win	1959	Wimbledon	Grass	(United States) Darlene Hard	(United States) Beverly Baker Fleitz (United Kingdom) Christine Truman	2–6, 6–2, 6–3
Win	1959	U.S. National Championships	Grass	(United States) Darlene Hard	(Brazil) Maria Bueno (United States) Sally Moore	6–2, 6–3
