= Margaret Hellyer =

Australian tennis player

- Country (sports): Australia
- Born: 29 July 1937 (age 87)

Singles

Grand Slam singles results
- Australian Open: 2R (1955, 1956, 1957, 1958)
- French Open: 3R (1957)
- Wimbledon: 4R (1960)

Doubles

Grand Slam doubles results
- Australian Open: SF (1957)
- Wimbledon: QF (1959, 1960)

Grand Slam mixed doubles results
- Wimbledon: SF (1957)

Margaret Hellyer (born 29 July 1937) is an Australian former tennis player.

Active in the 1950s and 1960s, Hellyer is a native of Sydney and had some of her best results on the grass courts of Wimbledon. She won the All England Plate in 1957 and was a mixed doubles semi-finalist that year with Roy Emerson. Her best singles run was a fourth round appearance in 1960 and she twice reached the women's doubles quarter-finals.

== Personal life ==
Hellyer had a relationship with Brazilian tennis player Carlos Fernandes and the pair were engaged. She was married to Kenneth Burston, an Englishman from Shropshire, in a 1963 wedding in Sydney.
