= Karol Fageros =

American tennis player

- Full name: Karol Fageros Short
- Country (sports): United States
- Born: April 27, 1934
- Died: April 12, 1988 (aged 53); Miami, Florida, U.S.
- Height: 5 ft 8 in (1.73 m)

Singles

Grand Slam singles results
- French Open: 2R (1958)
- Wimbledon: 4R (1957)
- US Open: 3R (1954, 1956, 1959)

Doubles

Grand Slam doubles results
- French Open: 3R (1959)
- Wimbledon: QF (1959)

Mixed doubles

Grand Slam mixed doubles results
- French Open: SF (1959)
- Wimbledon: QF (1958)

Karol Fageros (April 27, 1934 – April 4, 1988) was an American female tennis player who was active in the 1950s.

== Career ==
As a junior, she won the Orange Bowl Championships in the under-18 category in 1951 and 1952.

In 1954 she won the Canadian Championships singles title after a victory in the final against Ethel Norton. Together with Norton she also won the doubles title.

Fageros best singles result at a Grand Slam tournament was reaching the fourth round at the 1957 Wimbledon Championships in which she was defeated by Rosie Reyes. In the Wimbledon doubles and mixed doubles events she reached the quarterfinals in 1959 and 1958 respectively.

She played for the US team in the 1958 Wightman Cup, the annual women's team tennis competition between the United States and Great Britain. Partnering Dorothy Head Knode in the doubles match which they lost in straight sets to Shirley Bloomer and Christine Truman. That same year she was runner-up in singles at the U.S. Women's Clay Court Championships, losing the final in three sets to Knode. Another runner-up result was achieved in 1958 at the Swedish Open against Heather Segal.

After she had competed in the 1958 French Championships wearing gold lame underpants she was initially banned from competing at that year's Wimbledon event because her dress might distract her opponents but she was reinstated when she promised to cover them with white lace.

At the end of 1959 she signed a $30,000 professional contract to play a series of exhibition matches against Althea Gibson as the opening act for the Harlem Globetrotter basketball games and lost 4–114.
