= Sheila Armstrong (tennis) =

British tennis player

- Country (sports): United Kingdom
- Born: 1939
- Died: 1979 (aged 39)

Singles

Grand Slam singles results
- Australian Open: 2R (1956)
- Wimbledon: 4R (1957)
- US Open: 3R (1957)

Doubles

Grand Slam doubles results
- Wimbledon: QF (1960)

Grand Slam mixed doubles results
- Wimbledon: 4R (1957, 1959)

Sheila Armstrong (1939–1979) was a British tennis player. She became Sheila Brown after marriage.

Born in 1939, Armstrong grew up around Manchester, where her father worked as a bank manager. The family lived in the town of Droylsden before they moved to Didsbury to be close to the Northern Lawn Tennis Club. She attended Manchester Girls High School. In 1955 she claimed the junior singles title at Wimbledon. The following year, Armstrong won the junior doubles event with Lorraine Coghlan during the 1956 Australian Championships.

Armstrong earned a place on the British Wightman Cup team in 1957, playing doubles with Shirley Broomer. She made the singles fourth round at Wimbledon in 1957 and reached the quarter-finals of the women's doubles in 1960 partnering Deidre Catt. In 1960, her final year touring, she won several titles on the French Riviera tennis circuit.
