= Piet van Eijsden =

Dutch tennis player (1936–2021)

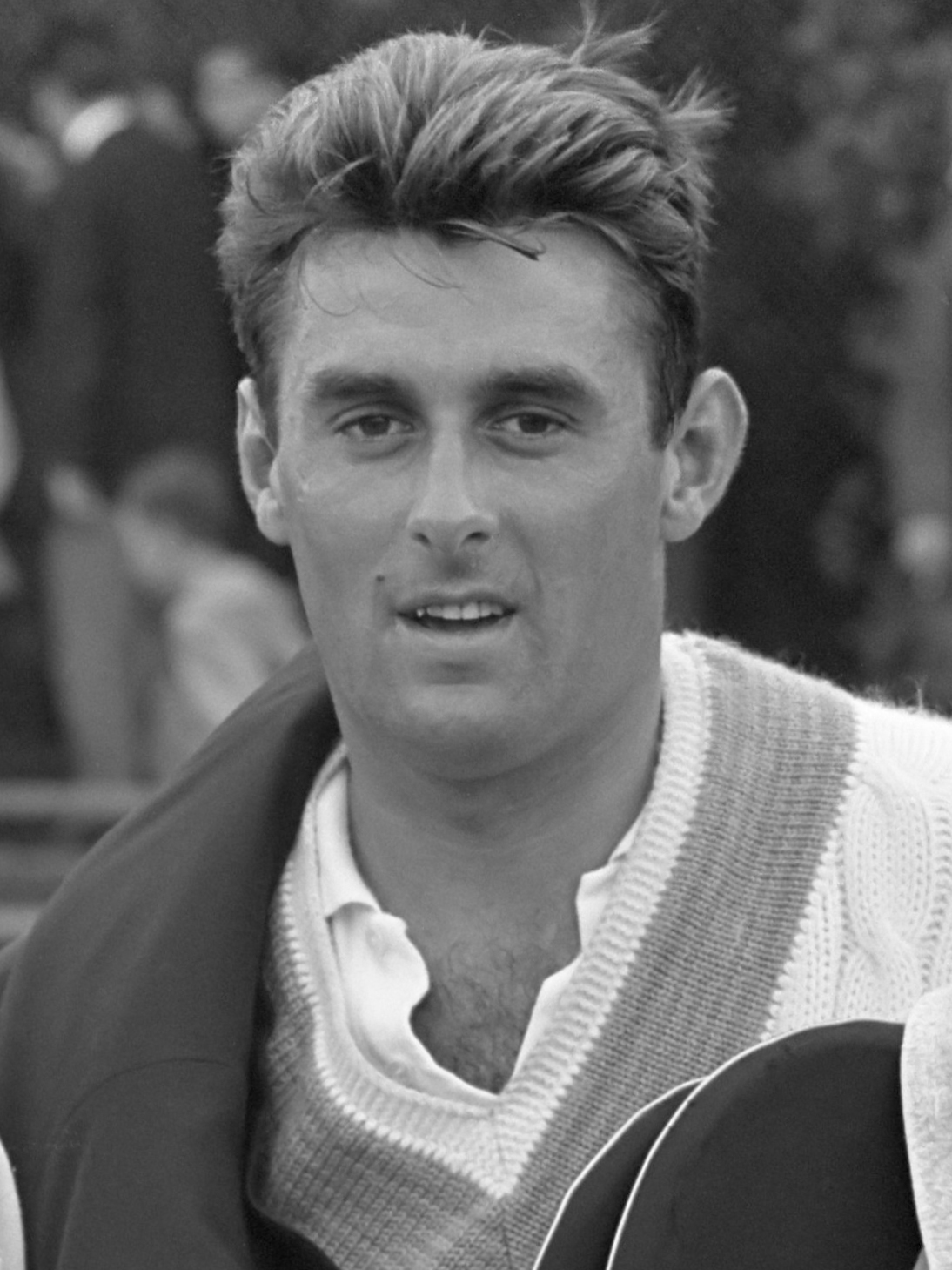
Van Eijsden in 1962

Piet van Eijsden (9 May 1936 – 18 May 2021) was a Dutch tennis player.

He was the runner-up in men's singles at the 1958 Dutch Open. He competed at the French Open (1959, 1960) and Wimbledon (1959, 1960, 1961, 1962). After retiring from playing, van Eijsden was tournament director of the Dutch Open from 1978 to 2006.
