= Gordon Forbes (tennis) =

South African tennis player and author (1934–2020)

- Country (sports): South Africa
- Born: 21 February 1934 Burgersdorp, Cape Province, South Africa
- Died: 9 December 2020 (aged 86) Plettenberg Bay, Cape Province, South Africa
- Plays: Right-handed

Singles
- Career record: 342-217 (72%)
- Career titles: 16

Grand Slam singles results
- Australian Open: 1R (1971)
- French Open: 3R (1955, 1956, 1957, 1959)
- Wimbledon: 4R (1956)
- US Open: QF (1962)

Grand Slam doubles results
- Australian Open: 2R (1962)
- French Open: F (1963)
- Wimbledon: SF (1963)

Grand Slam mixed doubles results
- French Open: W (1955)
- Wimbledon: QF (1962)

Team competitions
- Davis Cup: SF^{Eu} (1962, 1963)

Gordon Forbes (21 February 1934 – 9 December 2020) was a South African professional tennis player and author. Forbes won the singles title of the South African Championships in 1959 and 1961 and was runner-up in 1955, 1962, 1963 and 1964. He won the Tuscaloosa Grass Court Invitational in 1962, defeating Rod Laver in the final. During the 1950s and 1960s, he was the doubles partner of countryman Abe Segal. They were considered one of the best doubles teams in the world.

== Career ==
Forbes learnt to play tennis in his childhood on the family farm. At age 12, he played and won his first junior tournament in East London.

Forbes won the singles title of the South African Championships in 1959 and 1961 and was runner-up in 1955, 1962, 1963 and 1964. He won the Tuscaloosa Grass Court Invitational in 1962, defeating reigning U.S. No. 1 Whitney Reed in a marathon semifinal, and world No. 1 Rod Laver in a close four set final. He played for the South African Davis Cup team in 14 ties in the period 1955 to 1963 and compiled a record of 20 wins and 11 losses.

== Later life ==
After retiring from tennis, Forbes wrote three books about his experiences as a player, his contemporaries in the sport and other tennis topics. He died from COVID-19 on 9 December 2020, at age 86, during the COVID-19 pandemic in South Africa.

== Grand Slam finals ==
=== Doubles (1 runner-up) ===
Result	Year	Championship	Surface	Partner	Opponents	Score
Loss	1963	French Championships	Clay	(South Africa) Abe Segal	(Australia) Roy Emerson (Spain) Manuel Santana	2–6, 4–6, 4–6

=== Mixed doubles (1 title) ===
Result	Year	Championship	Surface	Partner	Opponents	Score
Win	1955	French Championships	Clay	(United States) Darlene Hard	(Australia) Jenny Staley (Chile) Luis Ayala	5–7, 6–1, 6–2

== Bibliography ==
- Forbes, Gordon (1979). A Handful of Summers. Mayflower Books. ISBN 978-0-8317-4362-8.
- Forbes, Gordon (1995). Too Soon To Panic. Viking. ISBN 978-0-670-86329-7.
- Forbes, Gordon (2017). I'll Take the Sunny Side: A Memoir. Bookstorm. ISBN 978-1928257448.
