= 1957 in tennis =

This page covers all the important events in the sport of tennis in 1957. It provides the results of notable tournaments throughout the year on both the men's and women's ILTF tennis circuits.

== Australian Open ==
Category	Champion(s)	Finalist(s)	Score
Men's singles	(Australia) Ashley Cooper	(Australia) Neale Fraser	6–3, 9–11, 6–4, 6–2
Women's singles	(United States) Shirley Fry	(United States) Althea Gibson	6–3, 6–4
Men's doubles	(Australia) Neale Fraser (Australia) Lew Hoad	(Australia) Mal Anderson (Australia) Ashley Cooper	6–3, 8–6, 6–4
Women's doubles	(United States) Shirley Fry (United States) Althea Gibson	(Australia) Mary Bevis Hawton (Australia) Fay Muller	6–2, 6–1
Mixed doubles	(Australia) Fay Muller (Australia) Mal Anderson	(Australia) Jill Langley (United Kingdom) Billy Knight	7–5, 3–6, 6–1

== French Open ==
Category	Champion(s)	Finalist(s)	Score
Men's singles	(Sweden) Sven Davidson	(United States) Herbert Flam	6–3, 6–4, 6–4
Women's singles	(United Kingdom) Shirley Bloomer	(United States) Dorothy Head Knode	6–1, 6–3
Men's doubles	(Australia) Malcolm Anderson (Australia) Ashley Cooper	(Australia) Don Candy (Australia) Mervyn Rose	6–3, 6–0, 6–3
Women's doubles	(United Kingdom) Shirley Bloomer (United States) Darlene Hard	(Mexico) Yola Ramírez (Mexico) Rosie Reyes	7–5, 4–6, 7–5
Mixed doubles	(Czechoslovakia) Věra Pužejová (Czechoslovakia) Jiří Javorský	(West Germany) Edda Buding (Chile) Luis Ayala	6–3, 6–4

== Wimbledon ==
Category	Champion(s)	Finalist(s)	Score
Men's singles	(Australia) Lew Hoad	(Australia) Ashley Cooper	6–2, 6–1, 6–2
Women's singles	(United States) Althea Gibson	(United States) Darlene Hard	6–3, 6–2
Men's doubles	(United States) Gardnar Mulloy (United States) Budge Patty	(Australia) Neale Fraser (Australia) Lew Hoad	8–10, 6–4, 6–4, 6–4
Women's doubles	(United States) Althea Gibson (United States) Darlene Hard	(Australia) Mary Hawton (Australia) Thelma Long	6–1, 6–2
Mixed doubles	(Australia) Mervyn Rose (United States) Darlene Hard	(Australia) Neale Fraser (United States) Althea Gibson	6–4, 7–5

== US Open ==
Category	Champion(s)	Finalist(s)	Score
Men's singles	(Australia) Malcolm Anderson	(Australia) Ashley Cooper	10–8, 7–5, 6–4
Women's singles	(United States) Althea Gibson	(United States) Louise Brough	6–3, 6–2
Men's doubles	(Australia) Ashley Cooper (Australia) Neale Fraser	(United States) Gardnar Mulloy (United States) Budge Patty	4–6, 6–3, 9–7, 6–3
Women's doubles	(United States) Louise Brough (United States) Margaret Osborne duPont	(United States) Althea Gibson (United States) Darlene Hard	6–2, 7–5
Mixed doubles	(United States) Althea Gibson (Denmark) Kurt Nielsen	(United States) Darlene Hard (Australia) Bob Howe	6–3, 9–7
