= Jenny Staley Hoad =

Australian tennis player (1934–2024)

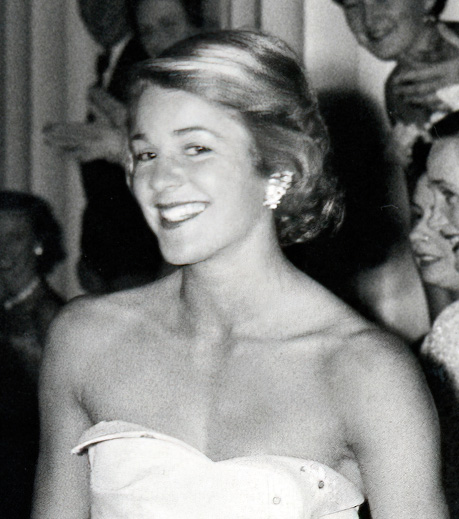
- Full name: Jennifer Staley Hoad
- Country (sports): Australia
- Born: 3 March 1934 Melbourne, Australia
- Died: 14 February 2024 (aged 89) Fuengirola, Spain
- Plays: Left-handed

Grand Slam singles results
- Australian Open: F (1954)
- French Open: QF (1956)
- Wimbledon: 4R (1955, 1956)
- US Open: 2R (1956)

Grand Slam doubles results
- Australian Open: SF (1955)
- Wimbledon: SF (1955)

Grand Slam mixed doubles results
- Australian Open: F (1955)
- French Open: F (1955)
- Wimbledon: SF (1955)

Jenny Staley Hoad (3 March 1934 – 14 February 2024) was an Australian tennis player who was mainly active in the 1950s.

== Career ==
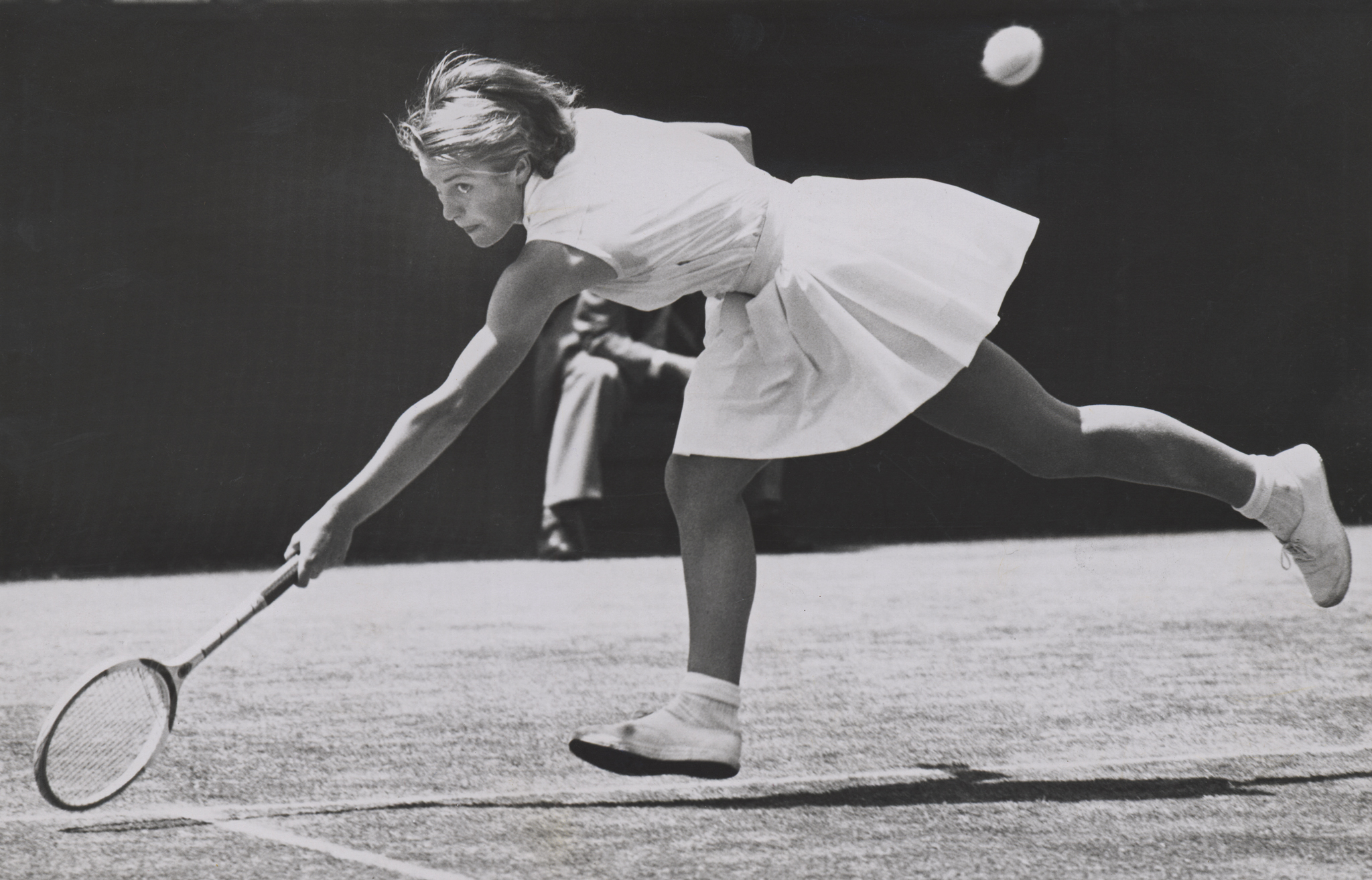

In January 1951 Staley won the junior doubles title at the Australian Championships partnering Margaret Wallis. In 1953 she also won the junior Australian singles title.

As Jenny Staley she reached the singles final of 1954 Australian Championships, played in Sydney, but lost in straight sets to top-seeded Thelma Coyne Long. Also in 1954, Staley won the women's singles title at the Australian Hard Court Championships, defeating the defending champion Beryl Penrose in a close match. In November 1954 she reached the final of the New South Wales Championships which she lost in three sets to Beryl Penrose. In December 1954 she was runner-up to Coyne Long at the Victorian Championships, played in Kooyong.

Staley won the women's singles title at the South Australian Championships at Memorial Drive Park in Adelaide in January 1955 defeating Fay Muller in the final in straight sets.

At the 1955 Australian Championships she partnered her then boyfriend Lew Hoad in the mixed event and were runners-up to Thelma Coyne Long and George Worthington. Her best singles performance at the Wimbledon Championships was reaching the fourth round in 1955, losing to eight-seeded Angela Buxton, and 1956 when she was defeated by fifth-seeded and eventual champion Shirley Fry.

== Personal life ==
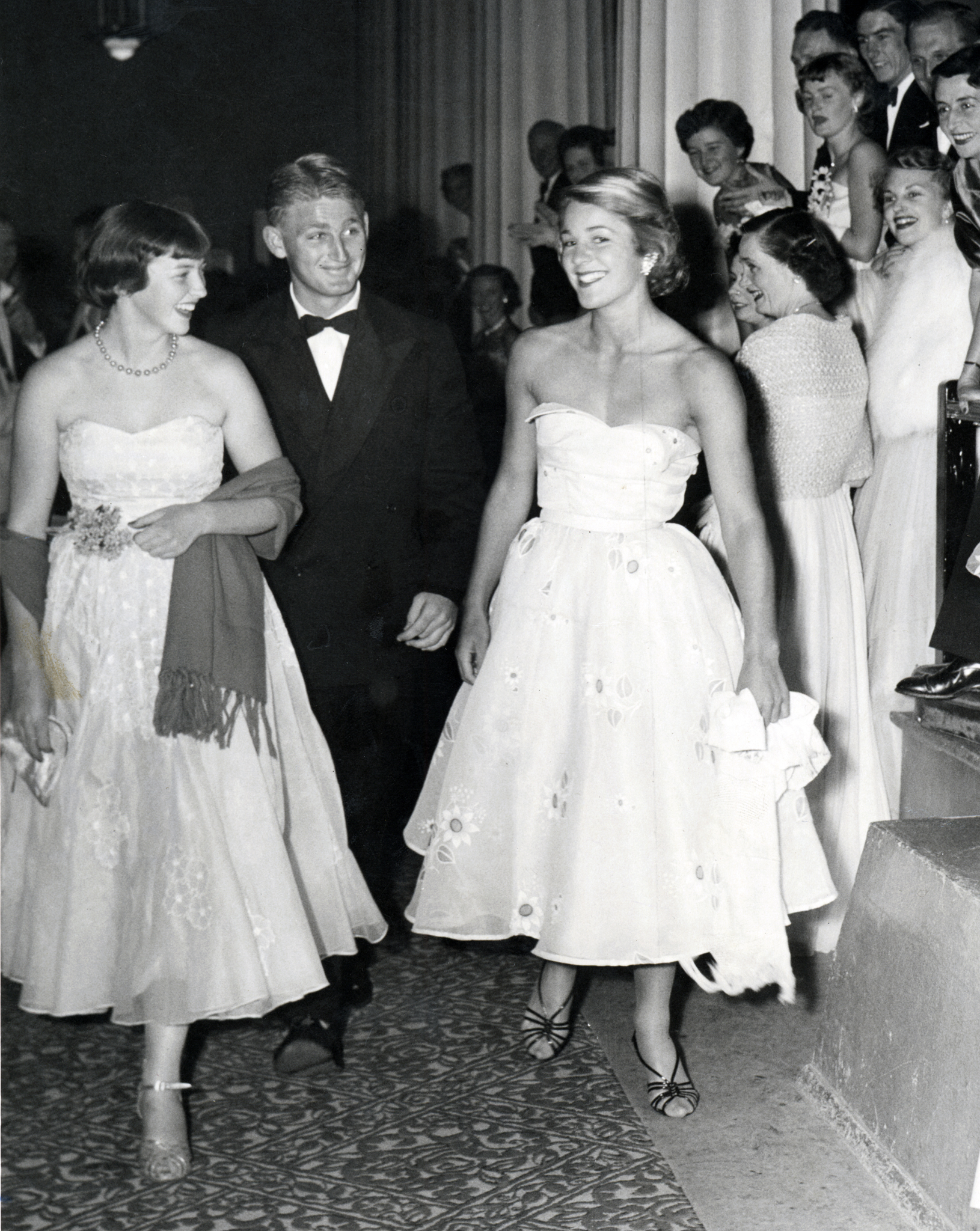
Lew Hoad and Jennifer Staley (right) at the Davis Cup Ball on 30 December 1953

Lew Hoad proposed to Staley on her 21st birthday party in March 1955, and they planned to announce their engagement in June in London while both were on an overseas tour. After arriving in London Staley discovered that she was pregnant, and the couple decided to get married straight away. The marriage took place the following day on 18 June 1955 at St Mary's Church, Wimbledon in London on the eve of Wimbledon. They had two daughters and a son. After Hoad's retirement they moved to Fuengirola, Spain, near Málaga, where they constructed and operated the tennis resort Lew Hoad's Campo de Tenis for more than 30 years, entertaining personal friends that included actors Stewart Granger, Sean Connery, Richard Burton, Peter Ustinov, Deborah Kerr and her husband Peter Viertel, Kirk Douglas, singer Frank Sinatra and saxophonist Stan Getz. Lew Hoad was diagnosed with a rare and incurable form of leukemia on 13 January 1994, which caused his death on 3 July 1994, at the age of 59.

Jenny Hoad sold the club in April 1999 but continued to live at the accompanying residential complex. In 2002, she published My Life with Lew with Jack Pollard.

Jenny Staley Hoad died in Fuengirola, Spain on 14 February 2024, at the age of 89.

== Grand Slam tournament finals ==
=== Singles: (1 runner-up) ===
Result	Year	Championship	Surface	Opponent	Score
Loss	1954	Australian Championships	Grass	(Australia) Thelma Coyne Long	3–6, 4–6

=== Mixed doubles: (2 runner-ups) ===
Result	Year	Championship	Surface	Partner	Opponents	Score
Loss	1955	Australian Championships	Grass	(Australia) Lew Hoad	(Australia) Thelma Coyne Long (Australia) George Worthington	2–6, 1–6
Loss	1955	French Championships	Clay	(Chile) Luis Ayala	(United States) Darlene Hard (South Africa) Gordon Forbes	7–5, 1–6, 2–6

== Grand Slam tournament performance timeline ==
Key
W	F	SF	QF	#R	RR	Q#	DNQ	A	NH

(W) winner; (F) finalist; (SF) semifinalist; (QF) quarterfinalist; (#R) rounds 4, 3, 2, 1; (RR) round-robin stage; (Q#) qualification round; (DNQ) did not qualify; (A) absent; (NH) not held; (SR) strike rate (events won / competed); (W–L) win–loss record.

=== Singles ===
Tournament	1952	1953	1954	1955	1956	1957	1958–67	1968	1969–71	1972	SR
Australian Open	2R	2R	F	SF	A	QF	A	A	A	A	0 / 5
French Open	A	A	A	2R	QF	2R	A	A	A	A	0 / 3
Wimbledon	A	A	A	4R	4R	1R	A	2R	A	Q1	0 / 4
US Open	A	A	A	A	2R	A	A	A	A	A	0 / 1
Strike rate	0 / 1	0 / 1	0 / 1	0 / 3	0 / 3	0 / 3	0 / 0	0 / 1	0 / 0	0 / 0	0 / 13
