= Sergio Jacobini =

Italian tennis player

- Country (sports): Italy
- Born: 1935
- Died: 2019 (aged 83–84)

Singles

Grand Slam singles results
- French Open: 4R (1957, 1962)
- Wimbledon: 1R (1962)

Team competitions
- Davis Cup: F (1961^{Ch})

Sergio Jacobini was an Italian tennis player.

Jacoboni was a four-time national doubles champion from Rome, active on tour in the 1950s and 1960s. He was singles champion at Aix-en-Provence in 1955. At the 1957 French Championships he had a win over ninth-seed Pierre Darmon en route to the fourth round. In 1961 he was a member of Italy's Davis Cup squad for the Challenge Round final in Melbourne, as an unused reserve to Nicola Pietrangeli and Orlando Sirola. He made the fourth round at Roland Garros again in 1962 and won the first set against top seed Rod Laver, before losing in four.
