= Dennis Bradshaw =

American tennis player

- Full name: Dennis Allene Bradshaw
- Country (sports): United States
- Born: August 14, 1936 (age 89)

Singles

Grand Slam singles results
- US Open: QF (1954)

Dennis Allene Bradshaw (born August 14, 1936) is an American former tennis player.

A native of San Diego, Bradshaw won the singles title at the Delaware Grass Court Championships in 1954.

Bradshaw has the unusual distinction of reaching the quarter-finals the only time she appeared in a grand slam tournament, at the 1954 U.S. National Championships. Following a walkover win over fourth-seed Margaret duPont in the third round, she lost her final eight match to Darlene Hard in three sets.

In 1955, she represented the United States at the Pan American Games in Mexico.
