= 1955 Australian Championships – Men's singles =

Men's singles
- 1955 Australian Championships

Final
- Champion: (Australia) Ken Rosewall
- Runner-up: (Australia) Lew Hoad
- Score: 9–7, 6–4, 6–4

Details
- Draw: 37
- Seeds: 16

Events
Singles	men	women
Doubles	men	women
- Australian Championships

First-seeded Ken Rosewall defeated Lew Hoad 9–7, 6–4, 6–4 in the final to win the men's singles tennis title at the 1955 Australian Championships.

== Seeds ==
The seeded players are listed below. Ken Rosewall is the champion; others show the round in which they were eliminated.

1. (Australia) Ken Rosewall (champion)
2. (United States) Vic Seixas (quarterfinals)
3. (Australia) Rex Hartwig (semifinals)
4. (United States) Tony Trabert (semifinals)
5. (Australia) Lew Hoad (finalist)
6. (Sweden) Sven Davidson (third round)
7. (Australia) Mervyn Rose (quarterfinals)
8. (Sweden) Lennart Bergelin (quarterfinals)
9. (Australia) Don Candy (second round)
10. (United Kingdom) Roger Becker (third round)
11. (Australia) Neale Fraser (third round)
12. n/a
13. (Australia) George Worthington (third round)
14. (United States) Michael Green (third round)
15. (Australia) Ashley Cooper (quarterfinals)
16. (United States) Gerald Moss (third round)

== Draw ==
=== Key ===
- Q = Qualifier
- WC = Wild card
- LL = Lucky loser
- r = Retired

=== Finals ===
Quarterfinals
1	(Australia) Ken Rosewall	6	6	6
15	(Australia) Ashley Cooper	4	2	0
7	(Australia) Mervyn Rose	5	6	3	1
4	(United States) Tony Trabert	7	4	6	6
3	(Australia) Rex Hartwig	4	6	4	6	6
8	(Sweden) Lennart Bergelin	6	2	6	4	3
5	(Australia) Lew Hoad	4	6	6	8
2	(United States) Vic Seixas	6	3	4	6

Semifinals
1	(Australia) Ken Rosewall	8	6	6
4	(United States) Tony Trabert	6	3	3
3	(Australia) Rex Hartwig	1	4	4
5	(Australia) Lew Hoad	6	6	6

Final
1	(Australia) Ken Rosewall	9	6	6
5	(Australia) Lew Hoad	7	4	4

=== Earlier rounds ===
==== Section 1 ====
First round

Second round
1	(Australia) Rosewall	6	6	7
(United Kingdom) Bennett	0	4	5
(Australia) Flanders	1	2	7
10	(United Kingdom) Becker	6	6	9
15	(Australia) Cooper	8	6	6
(Australia) Wilderspin	6	1	1
(Australia) Potter	3	1	6	3
6	(Sweden) Davidson	6	6	4	6

Third round
1	(Australia) Rosewall	6	1	9	6
10	(United Kingdom) Becker	0	6	7	2
15	(Australia) Cooper	8	6	6
6	(Sweden) Davidson	6	3	2

Quarterfinals
1	(Australia) Rosewall	6	6	6
15	(Australia) Cooper	4	2	0

==== Section 2 ====
First round
(Australia) Mason	6	6
(Australia) Rowe	0	1
(Australia) Goodger	6	6	6
(Australia) Reid	4	0	2

Second round
7	(Australia) Rose	6	6	6
(Australia) Mason	1	0	1
(Australia) Emerson	6	6	6	3	2
16	(United States) Moss	8	3	2	6	6
11	(Australia) Fraser	6	6	3	7
(Australia) Bowman	4	4	6	5
(Australia) Goodger	1	2	1
4	(United States) Trabert	6	6	6

Third round
7	(Australia) Rose	7	6	6
16	(United States) Moss	5	2	1
11	(Australia) Fraser	6	6	1	4	4
4	(United States) Trabert	1	3	6	6	6

Quarterfinals
7	(Australia) Rose	5	6	3	1
4	(United States) Trabert	7	4	6	6

==== Section 3 ====
First round
(Australia) Kenny	6	6	6
(Australia) Sumner	1	2	3

Second round
3	(Australia) Hartwig	6	6	6
(Australia) Kenny	1	2	3
(United Kingdom) Barrett	3	6	5	2
14	(United States) Green	6	4	7	6
13	(Australia) Worthington	6	6	6
(Australia) Hann	4	4	3
(Australia) Gilmour	2	1	1
8	(Sweden) Bergelin	6	6	6

Third round
3	(Australia) Hartwig	6	9	6	6
14	(United States) Green	1	11	0	2
13	(Australia) Worthington	2	4	6	2
8	(Sweden) Bergelin	6	6	4	6

Quarterfinals
3	(Australia) Hartwig	4	6	4	6	6
8	(Sweden) Bergelin	6	2	6	4	3

==== Section 4 ====
First round
(Australia) O'Brien	9	6	6
(Australia) Johnson	7	4	3
(Australia) Ryan	6	6	6
(Australia) Mehaffey	3	1	0

Second round
5	(Australia) Hoad	6	6	6
(Australia) O'Brien	3	3	4
(Australia) Blacklock	2	0	1
(Australia) Woodcock	6	6	6
9	(Australia) Candy	10	4	3	4
(Australia) Anderson	8	6	6	6
(Australia) Ryan	2	2	0
2	(United States) Seixas	6	6	6

Third round
5	(Australia) Hoad	6	6	6
(Australia) Woodcock	1	2	3
(Australia) Anderson	2	0	2
2	(United States) Seixas	6	6	6

Quarterfinals
5	(Australia) Hoad	4	6	6	8
2	(United States) Seixas	6	3	4	6

Preceded by 1954 U.S. National Championships	Grand Slam men's singles	Succeeded by 1955 French Championships
