= 1955 Australian Championships – Women's singles =

Women's singles
- 1955 Australian Championships

Final
- Champion: (Australia) Beryl Penrose
- Runner-up: (Australia) Thelma Long
- Score: 6–4, 6–3

Details
- Draw: 32
- Seeds: 8

Events
| Singles | men | women |
| Doubles | men | women |
- Australian Championships

Second-seeded Beryl Penrose defeated Thelma Long 6–4, 6–3 in the final to win the women's singles tennis title at the 1955 Australian Championships.

== Seeds ==
The seeded players are listed below. Beryl Penrose is the champion; others show the round in which they were eliminated.

1. (Australia) Thelma Long (finalist)
2. (Australia) Beryl Penrose (champion)
3. (Australia) Jenny Staley (semifinals)
4. (Australia) Mary Carter (semifinals)
5. (Australia) Fay Muller (quarterfinals)
6. (Australia) Daphne Seeney (second round)
7. (Australia) Loris Nichols (second round)
8. (Australia) Norma Ellis (quarterfinals)

== Draw ==
=== Key ===
- Q = Qualifier
- WC = Wild card
- LL = Lucky loser
- r = Retired

=== Finals ===
Quarterfinals
1 | (Australia) Thelma Long | 6 | 6
8 | (Australia) Norma Ellis | 0 | 3
4 | (Australia) Mary Carter | 4 | 6 | 6
5 | (Australia) Fay Muller | 6 | 2 | 3
(Australia) Nell Hopman | 3 | 0
3 | (Australia) Jenny Staley | 6 | 6
(Australia) Mary Hawton | 1 | 6 | 6
2 | (Australia) Beryl Penrose | 6 | 1 | 8

Semifinals
1 | (Australia) Thelma Long | 6 | 6
4 | (Australia) Mary Carter | 2 | 1
3 | (Australia) Jenny Staley | 4 | 6
2 | (Australia) Beryl Penrose | 6 | 8

Finals
1 | (Australia) Thelma Long | 4 | 3
2 | (Australia) Beryl Penrose | 6 | 6

=== Earlier rounds ===
==== Section 1 ====
First round
1 | (Australia) Long | 6 | 6
(Australia) Egar | 0 | 3
(Australia) McCalman | 6 | 3 | 6
(Australia) Williman | 3 | 6 | 4
8 | (Australia) Ellis | 5 | 6 | 6
(Australia) Huddlestone | 7 | 1 | 3
(Australia) Sheidow | 6 | 6
(Australia) Stewart | 4 | 2
4 | (Australia) Carter | 6 | 6
(Australia) Greenslade | 1 | 1
(Australia) Parmenter | 6 | 6
(Australia) Tracey | 2 | 3
5 | (Australia) Muller | 6 | 6
(Australia) Strachan | 0 | 1
(Australia) Orton | 6 | 3 | 6
(Australia) Rosman | 3 | 6 | 4

Second round
1 | (Australia) Long | 6 | 6
(Australia) McCalman | 1 | 1
8 | (Australia) Ellis | 6 | 6
(Australia) Sheidow | 3 | 2
4 | (Australia) Carter | 6 | 6
(Australia) Parmenter | 1 | 3
5 | (Australia) Muller | 6 | 7
(Australia) Orton | 4 | 5

Quarterfinals
1 | (Australia) Long | 6 | 6
8 | (Australia) Ellis | 0 | 3
4 | (Australia) Carter | 4 | 6 | 6
5 | (Australia) Muller | 6 | 2 | 3

Semifinals
1 | (Australia) Long | 6 | 6
4 | (Australia) Carter | 2 | 1

==== Section 2 ====
First round
(Australia) Hopman | 5 | 10 | 6
(Australia) Langley | 7 | 8 | 1
6 | (Australia) Seeney | 6 | 9
(Australia) O'Donnell | 4 | 7
(Australia) Hellyer | 6 | 6
(Australia) McLeod | 3 | 1
3 | (Australia) Staley | 6 | 6
(Australia) Kennedy | 0 | 3
(Australia) Hawton | 6 | 7
(Australia) Thiele | 1 | 5
7 | (Australia) Nichols | 6 | 6
(Australia) Wells | 1 | 1
(Australia) Coghlan | 6 | 2 | 6
(Australia) Jones | 2 | 6 | 4
2 | (Australia) Penrose | 6 | 6
(Australia) Thomas | 1 | 1

Second round
(Australia) Hopman | 4 | 6 | 6
6 | (Australia) Seeney | 6 | 4 | 4
(Australia) Hellyer | 4 | 3
3 | (Australia) Staley | 6 | 6
(Australia) Hawton | 6 | 5 | 6
7 | (Australia) Nichols | 2 | 7 | 2
(Australia) Coghlan | 1 | 3
2 | (Australia) Penrose | 6 | 6

Quarterfinals
(Australia) Hopman | 3 | 0
3 | (Australia) Staley | 6 | 6
(Australia) Hawton | 1 | 6 | 6
2 | (Australia) Penrose | 6 | 1 | 8

Semifinals
3 | (Australia) Staley | 4 | 6
2 | (Australia) Penrose | 6 | 8

| Preceded by 1954 U.S. National Championships – Women's singles | Grand Slam women's singles | Succeeded by 1955 French Championships – Women's singles |
