= Lew Hoad =

Australian tennis player (1934–1994)

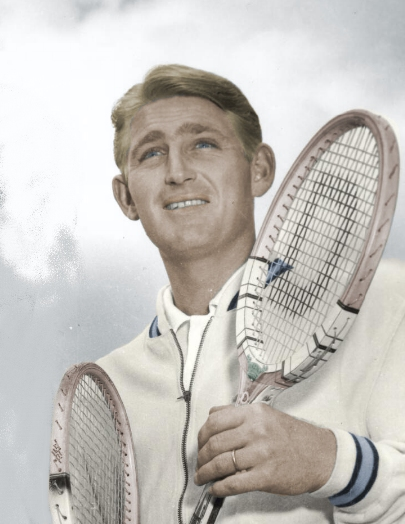
- Hoad at the 1954 Davis Cup
- Full name: Lewis Alan Hoad
- Country (sports): Australia
- Born: 23 November 1934 Glebe, Australia
- Died: 3 July 1994 (aged 59) Fuengirola, Spain
- Height: 1.79 m (5 ft 10 1/2 in)
- Turned pro: 1957 (amateur tour from 1950)
- Retired: 1973
- Plays: Right-handed (one-handed backhand)
- Int. Tennis HoF: 1980 (member page)

Singles
- Career record: 937–592 (61.2%)
- Career titles: 52
- Highest ranking: No. 1 (1953, Philippe Chatrier)

Grand Slam singles results
- Australian Open: W (1956)
- French Open: W (1956)
- Wimbledon: W (1956, 1957)
- US Open: F (1956)

Other tournaments
- Professional majors
- US Pro: F (1958, 1959)
- Wembley Pro: F (1961, 1962, 1963)
- French Pro: F (1958, 1960)
- Other pro events
- TOC: W (1958^{AU}, 1959^{FH})

Grand Slam doubles results
- Australian Open: W (1953, 1956, 1957)
- French Open: W (1953)
- Wimbledon: W (1953, 1955, 1956)
- US Open: W (1956)

Grand Slam mixed doubles results
- Australian Open: F (1955)
- French Open: W (1954)
- Wimbledon: SF (1953, 1954, 1955)
- US Open: F (1952, 1956)

Team competitions
- Davis Cup: W (1952, 1953, 1955, 1956)

Lewis Alan Hoad (23 November 1934 – 3 July 1994) was an Australian tennis player whose career ran from 1950 to 1973. Hoad won four Major singles tournaments as an amateur (the Australian Championships, French Championships and two Wimbledons). He was a member of the Australian team that won the Davis Cup four times between 1952 and 1956. Hoad turned professional in July 1957. He won the Kooyong Tournament of Champions in 1958 and the Forest Hills Tournament of Champions in 1959. He won the Ampol Open Trophy world series of tournaments in 1959, which included the Kooyong tournament that concluded in early January 1960. Hoad's singles tournament victories spanned from 1951 to 1971.

He had a career-long friendly rivalry with compatriot and fellow Sydneysider Ken Rosewall.

Hoad was ranked the world No. 1 amateur in 1953 by Harry Hopman, by Noel Brown and by the editors of Tennis de France, and also in 1956 by Lance Tingay, by Ned Potter, and by Tennis de France. He was ranked the world No. 1 professional for 1959 in Kramer's Ampol ranking system.

Serious back problems plagued Hoad throughout his career, possibly caused by a weight-lifting exercise that he devised in 1954. The back injury became particularly intense following the 1956 Wimbledon championships, continued periodically, and led to his semi-retirement from tennis in 1967. Afterwards, he made sporadic appearances at tournaments, enticed by the advent of the Open Era in 1968.

Following his retirement in 1973, Hoad and his wife Jenny constructed, owned and operated a tennis resort, Lew Hoad's Campo de Tenis in Fuengirola, Spain, where he died of leukaemia on 3 July 1994, aged 59.

== Early life and career ==
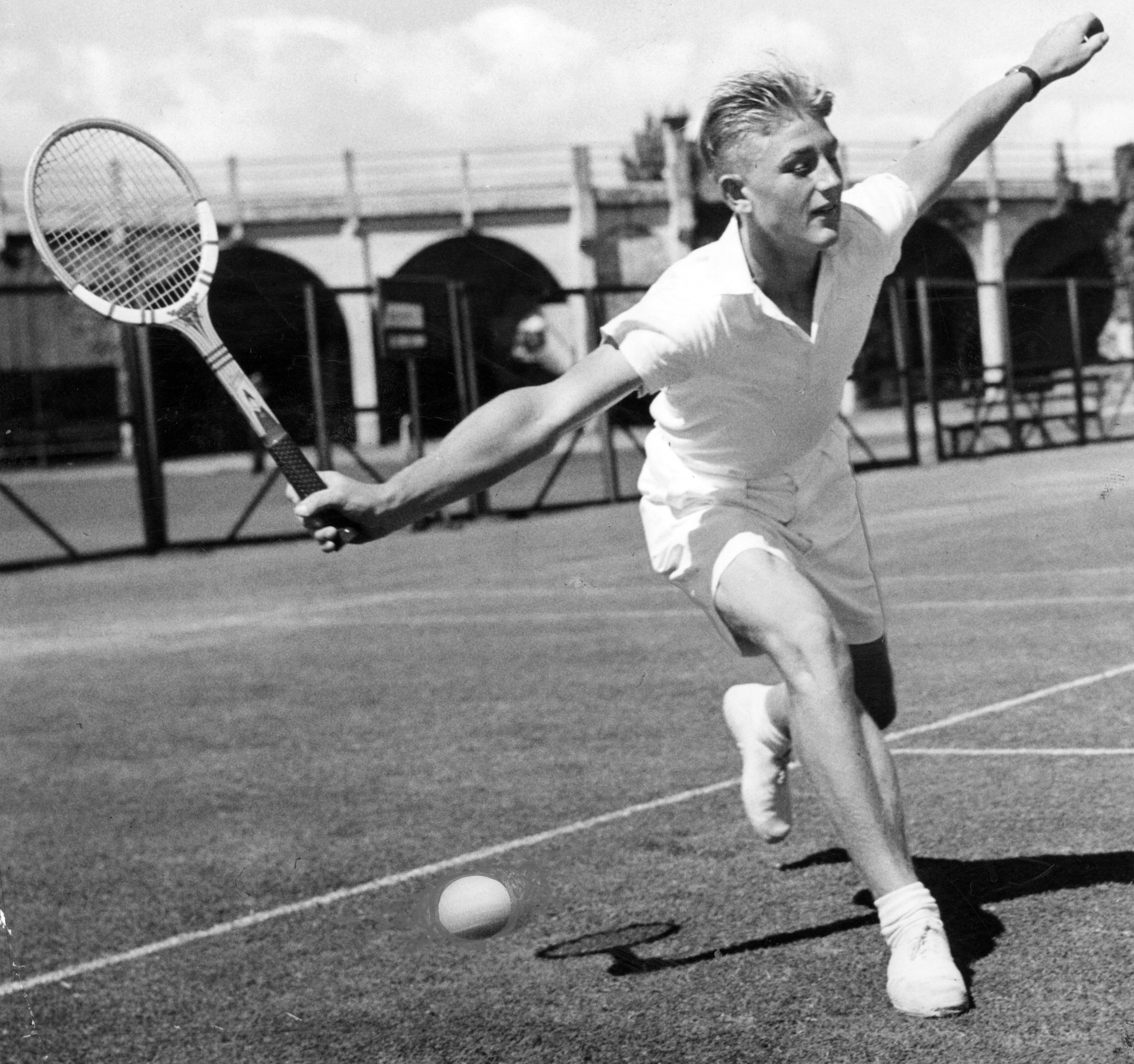
Hoad at age 15 competing at Kooyong in Inter State Tennis in 1949

Lewis Hoad (Note: Lewis Hoad was named after the American actor Lewis Stone.) was born on 23 November 1934, in the working-class Sydney inner suburb of Glebe, the eldest of three sons of tramway electrician Alan Hoad and his wife, Ailsa Lyle Burbury. Hoad started playing tennis at age five with a racket gifted by a local social club. As a young child, he would wake up at 5 a.m. and hit tennis balls against a wall and garage door until the neighbours complained, and he was allowed to practice on the courts of the Hereford Tennis Club behind the house. At age 10 he competed in the seaside tournament at Manly in the under 16 category.

In his youth, Hoad often played Ken Rosewall, and they became known as the Sydney "twins", although they had very different physiques, personalities and playing styles. Their first match in Sydney in January 1947 (when both were aged 12) was played as an opener of an exhibition match between Australia and America. Rosewall won 6–0, 6–0. Hoad built up great physical strength, especially in his hands and arms, by training at a police boys' club, where he made a name as a boxer. Hoad was about 12 when he was introduced to Adrian Quist, a former Australian tennis champion and then general manager of the Dunlop sports goods company. Quist played a couple of sets with Hoad and was impressed by his natural ability. When Hoad was 14 he left school and joined the Dunlop payroll, following the pattern of that 'shamateur' era when most of Australia's brightest tennis prospects were employed by sporting goods companies.

Hoad had just turned 15 when he and Rosewall were selected to play for New South Wales in an interstate contest against Victoria. In November 1949, Hoad won the junior title at the New South Wales Championships, and the same weekend, he also competed in the final of the junior table tennis championship in Sydney.

== Tennis career ==
=== Amateur career: 1950–1957 ===
==== 1950 ====
Hoad lost to Dick Savitt in four sets in the first round of the New South Wales State championships in November. In his match report, Adrian Quist said, "Hoad played well, and held a lead of 4-2 in the third set after winning the second. At present he makes too many errors. He will have to learn good control from the ground before his game will reach great heights." Hoad reached the semi-finals of the County of Cumberland championships in Sydney in December, losing to Bill Sidwell.

==== 1951 ====
Hoad's first Grand Slam tournament appearance was at the 1951 Australian Championships held in January at the White City Tennis Club in Sydney. He won his first match against Ronald McKenzie but lost in the following round to defending champion and countryman Frank Sedgman. It was the only Grand Slam tournament he played that year. Hoad won his first singles title, the Brisbane Exhibition tournament at Milton, on grass, on 11 August 1951, defeating Rosewall in the final in four sets. In September, Hoad won the New South Wales hardcourt championships beating George Worthington in the final.

==== 1952 ====
In 1952, Hoad reached the third round of the Australian Championships in Adelaide. In April, he was selected by the Australasian Lawn Tennis Association as member of the team to play in overseas tournaments under the guidance of coach Harry Hopman. In May, before departing to Europe, he won the singles title at the Australian Hardcourt Championships on clay after a five-sets final win against Rosewall. Hoad, who had never played a tournament on European clay courts, lost in the second round of the French Championships in straight sets to 1947 and 1951 finalist Eric Sturgess. In only their second appearance as a doubles team at a Grand Slam event, Hoad and Rosewall reached the French semifinal. Hoad lost to Budge Patty in the quarterfinal of the Belgian Championships, in Brussels in early June. Hoad's first entry at the grass court Queen's Club Championship in June ended in the quarterfinal against eventual champion Frank Sedgman. A week later, he played his first match at the Wimbledon Championships defeating Beppe Merlo in a nervous and unimpressive five-set encounter. Further wins against Rolando Del Bello and Freddie Huber were followed by a fourth round loss against second-seeded and eventual finalist Jaroslav Drobný. Hoad and Rosewall caused an upset when they defeated the second-seeded team of Gardnar Mulloy and Dick Savitt in the third round of the doubles event, but lost in the semifinal against Vic Seixas and Eric Sturgess.

After a semifinal result at the Swedish championships in July, and an exhibition between Australia and West Germany, Hoad and the Australian team traveled to the United States. As preparation for his first U.S. Championships he competed in the Eastern grass court events at Southampton, South Orange and Newport, before teaming up with Rosewall to reach the semifinal of the U.S. National Doubles Championships in Brookline. Hoad was the eighth seeded foreign player at the U.S. Championships. (Note: The U.S. Championships used separate seeding lists for U.S. and foreign players between 1927, the first year seeding were used, and 1956.) He won four matches to reach his first Grand Slam quarterfinal, but due in part to making 64 errors could not overcome Sedgman who would win the tournament. With Thelma Coyne Long he reached the final of the mixed doubles event, the first Grand Slam final of his career, but lost in straight sets to Doris Hart and Frank Sedgman. An early loss at the Pacific Southwest Championships in September concluded his first overseas tour. In September, he was jointly ranked No. 10 in the world for 1952 with Rosewall by Lance Tingay of The Daily Telegraph.

==== 1953 ====
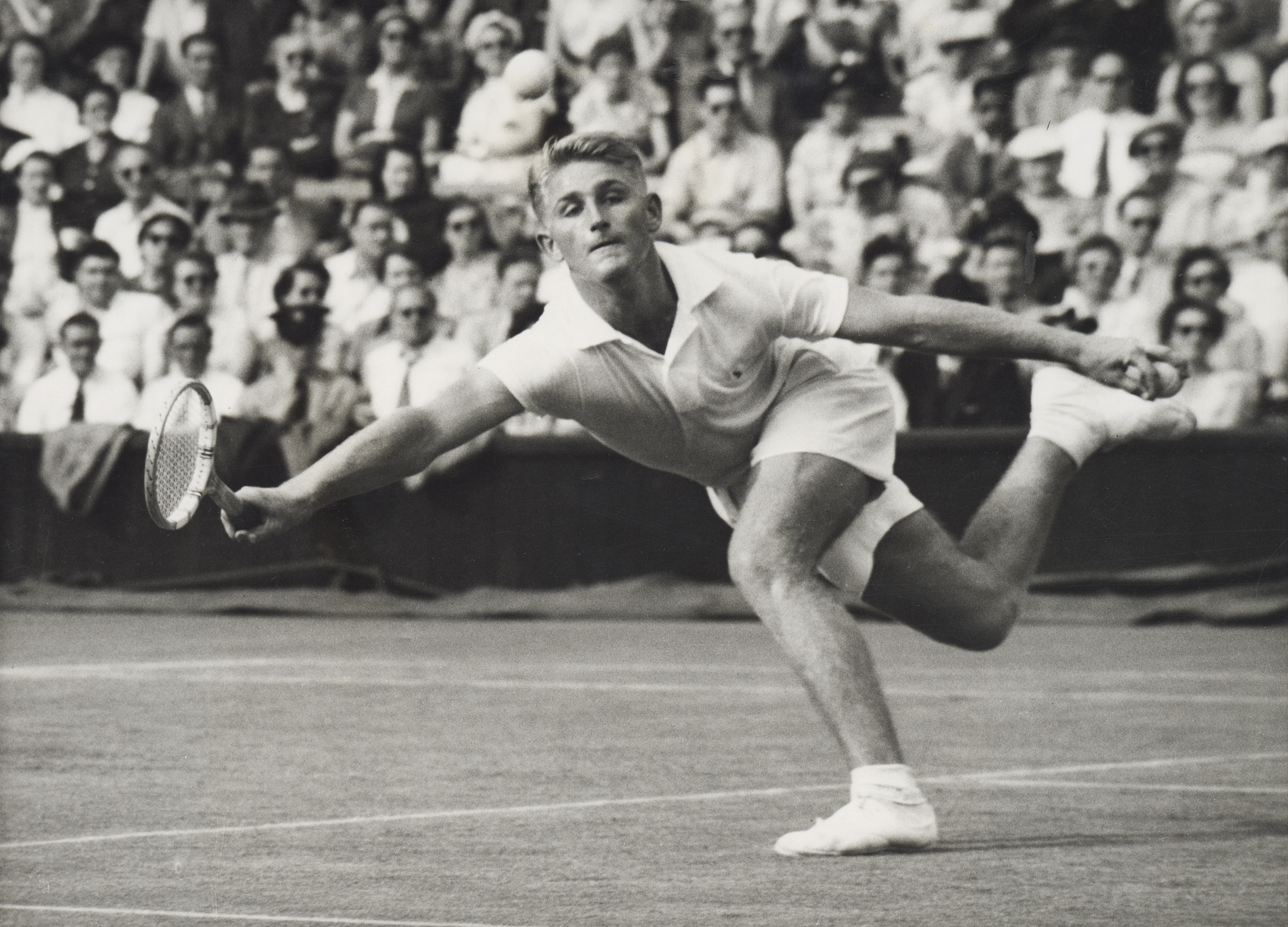
Hoad in 1953

Hoad started 1953 with a second-round exit against Clive Wilderspin at the Australian Championships in Melbourne after playing an uncharacteristic baseline game. Hoad and Rosewall became the youngest team to win the Australian doubles title after a victory in the final against Mervyn Rose and Don Candy. In March, Hoad defended his title at the Australian Hardcourt Championships, defeating Rosewall in a five-set semifinal, surviving six matchpoints, and 34-year-old John Bromwich in the final. Two weeks later, Hoad lost the final of the N.S.W. Hardcourt Championships to Mervyn Rose.

Hoad's second overseas tour started in late April. After an exhibition in Cairo at the Gezira Sporting Club, he reached the Italian Championships final in Rome, losing to Drobný in straight sets. He won the doubles title with Rosewall. At the French Championships in May, Hoad, seeded fourth, made it to the quarterfinals where he lost to Vic Seixas due to overhitting and an unreliable serve. Hoad and Rosewall won the doubles title with a three-set win in the final against countrymen Rose and Wilderspin. In June, his attacking serve-and-volley game proved too strong for Rosewall in the final of the Queen's Club Championships, winning the event without losing a set.

At Wimbledon, Hoad was seeded sixth and, as at the French, Seixas defeated him in the quarterfinal, this time in a close five-set match. In an all-Australian doubles final Hoad and Rosewall defeated Hartwig and Rose. Hoad lost to Enrique Morea in the final of the Dutch Championships in mid July. He won his first title on U.S. soil at the Eastern Grass Court Championships in mid August, defeating Rex Hartwig in the final, but pulled a back muscle in his semifinal against Rosewall. Hoad and Rosewall's hopes of winning the doubles Grand Slam, two years after Ken McGregor and Frank Sedgman first achieved that feat, were dashed when they lost surprisingly in the third round of the U.S. Doubles Championships in Brookline. At the U.S. Championships Hoad (second foreign seed) reached the semifinal where, for the third time in 1953, he lost in a Grand Slam event to Vic Seixas. Following his defeat, and that of Rosewall in the other semifinal, there was criticism in the Australian press that both 18-year-old players were physically and mentally worn out due to the intensive schedule imposed by coach Harry Hopman. Seixas again beat Hoad in the semifinal of the Pacific Southwest Championships in September.

Hoad rested a few weeks upon his return to Australia and then won the Queensland Championships in early November against Hartwig. Two weeks later, he won the N.S.W. Championships in front of a 10,000 Sydney crowd after four-set wins against Tony Trabert and Rosewall in the semi-final and final, but had trouble with a sore right elbow. In early December he won the Victorian Championships title against Rosewall.

The much anticipated Davis Cup challenge round match against the United States took place at the Melbourne Kooyong Stadium in late December. Surprisingly Hartwig was selected to partner Hoad in the doubles instead of Rosewall, a decision widely criticized in the press. In the opening singles matches, Hoad defeated his nemesis Seixas in straight sets, while Trabert defeated Rosewall. Hoad and Hartwig lost the doubles match to Seixas and Trabert and Australia trailed 1–2 at the start of the final day. In a memorable match, in front of a 17,000 crowd, 19-year-old Hoad defeated US champion Tony Trabert in five sets to help his country retain the Cup. (Note: Ken Rosewall won the deciding rubber, played on the next day due to rain, against Vic Seixas in four sets.) It was seen as one of the best Davis Cup matches in history. Directly following the final, Hoad received his call-up papers for National Service.

Hoad was ranked world No. 5 amateur for 1953 by Lance Tingay in his September rankings. (Note: The annual Tingay September amateur rankings from 1952–1967 were also published in USLTA/USTA official encyclopedias, Bud Collins' tennis encyclopedia in the 1985 and later editions, the Italian annual Almanacco illustrato del tennis and other publications.) At the end of the year, Hoad was ranked world No. 1 amateur for the 1953 season by Harry Hopman, Noel Brown and the editors of Tennis de France, published by Philippe Chatrier. Tingay stated in September 1954 that Hoad in 1953 had "played so well during the Australian season that his status as best in the world was axiomatic." He added that for the 1954 season, "His form since has been almost disastrous. Hoad's decline has been a mystery." Hoad was the youngest tennis player ever at 19 years 38 days to achieve world No. 1 rankings, a record which still stands.

==== 1954 ====
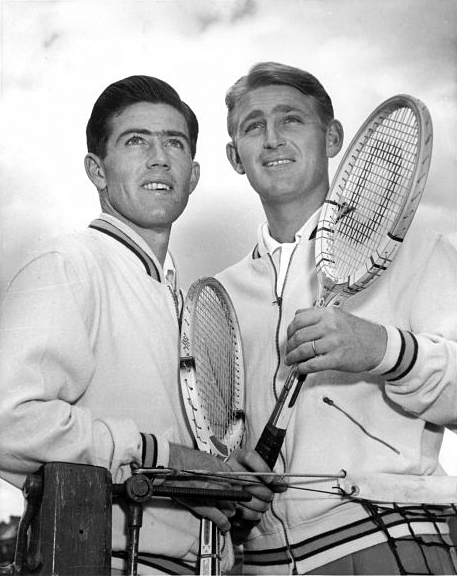
Ken Rosewall (left) and Hoad at the 1954 Davis Cup challenge-round match against the US at White City, Sydney

Before entering his National Service training Hoad reached the final at the South Australian Championships in Adelaide but sub-par play led to a straight-sets defeat to Trabert. On 13 January, Hoad joined the 13th National Service Training battalion in Ingleburn for a period of 98 days and commented that "It will be a welcome break from tennis". Hoad was therefore unable to compete in the Australian Championships. At the end of February, he received a leave from service to play for the Australian team at Kooyong stadium in the third Test match against South Africa, in front of the Queen and the Duke of Edinburgh. When Hoad returned to service, he was bitten by a spider while on maneuvers which caused him to become ill and hospitalized him for ten days. He spent two days in coma which was not made public.

While in service, Hoad devised a weight-lifting exercise, doing push-ups with round 50 lb. weights placed on his back, which he later believed probably initiated his back trouble. Hoad left the National Service at the end of April and his third overseas tour with an Australian team started on 5 May. For the first time in his career, Hoad was the top-seeded player at a Grand Slam tournament at the French Championships but lost in the fourth round to 40-year-old Gardnar Mulloy. Hoad lost the doubles final with Rosewall to Seixas and Trabert. Partnering Maureen Connolly, who had won the women's singles title, Hoad won the mixed-doubles final against Jacqueline Patorni and Rex Hartwig.

In June, Hoad overcame Rose in the final of the Queen's Club Championship to retain his title. Hoad was seeded second behind Trabert at Wimbledon. In the quarterfinal the powerful service and excellent returns of Drobný proved too much for Hoad and he was beaten in straight sets within an hour. Hoad and Rosewall were unable to defend their Wimbledon doubles title, losing in the semifinal to Seixas and Trabert. A surprise loss to Roger Becker at the Midland Counties Championships in Birmingham was followed in mid-July by winning the title at the Swiss Championships in Gstaad against Fraser. As in 1953, Hoad met Rosewall in the Eastern Grass Court Championships in August, this time in the final, and the titleholder overpowered Rosewall to win the title in straight sets. At Newport in mid August, he was beaten by 17-year-old compatriot Roy Emerson who won the deciding set 8–6. For the third time in 1954, Seixas and Trabert defeated Hoad and Rosewall at a Grand Slam doubles event, winning the U.S. Doubles Championships.

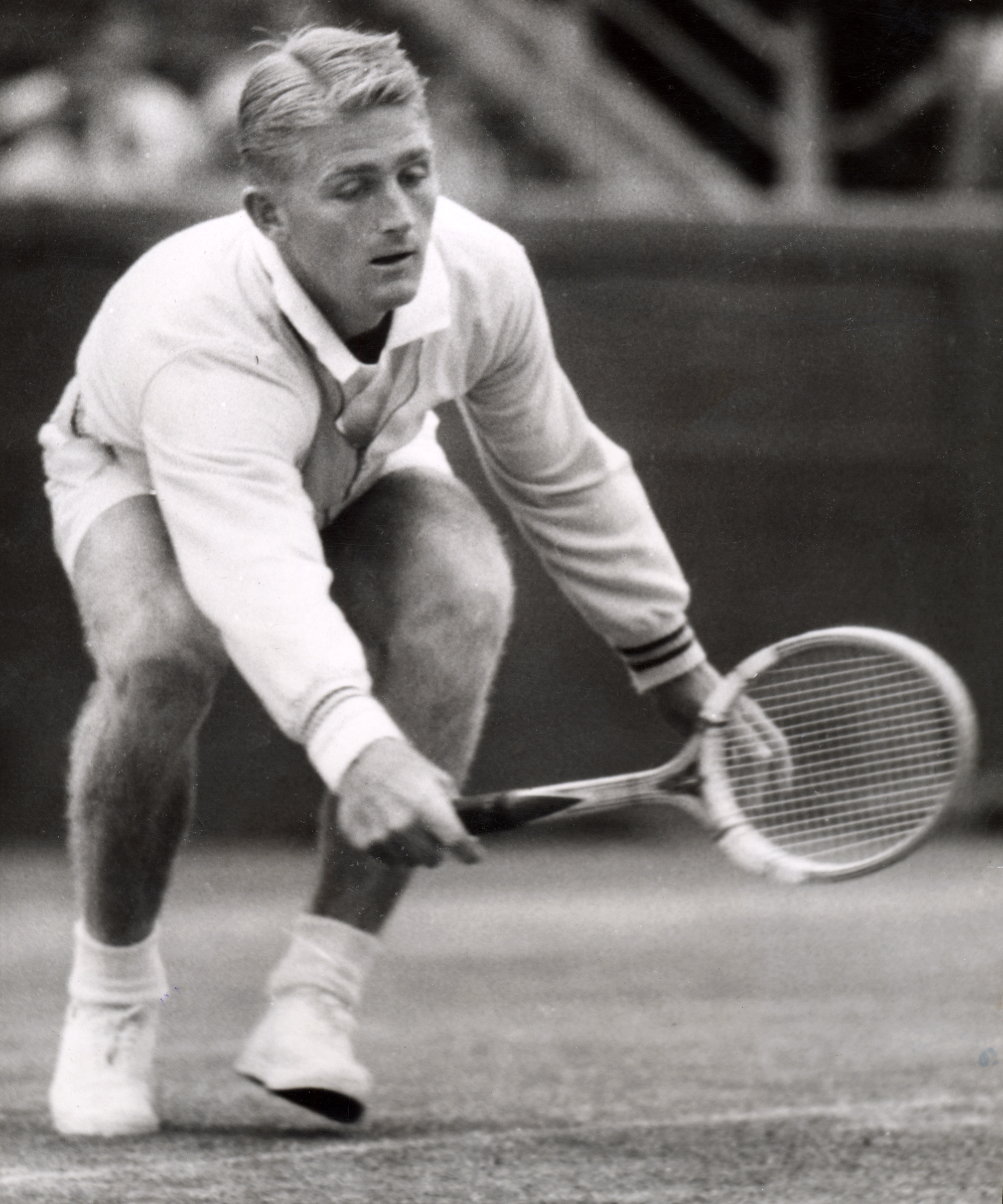
Hoad at Kooyong in 1954

Hoad, no. 1 foreign seed at the U.S. Championships, lost to Ham Richardson in a five-set quarterfinal. Hoad's lackluster form, which he blamed on a lack of consistency, continued when he was beaten by Luis Ayala in the quarterfinal of the Pacific Southwest Championships in mid-September. At the Sydney Metropolitan Championships he lost to Don Candy in the semifinal. In early November, matters briefly improved. In the final of the Queensland Championships, he overcame a sunstroke and the loss of two bagel sets to defeat Hartwig. In mid-November, he was upset by veteran John Bromwich who better handled the windy conditions in the quarterfinal of the N.S.W. Championships. At the Victorian Championships Hoad lost in straight sets in the semifinal to Seixas. He showed such poor form and at times an apparent lack of interest that he was jeered by the crowd.

The Davis Cup Challenge Round was played on 27–29 December on the grass courts of White City Stadium in Sydney between title holders Australia and the United States. Hoad lost the first rubber to Trabert in four sets, in front of a record crowd of 25,000. Rosewall also lost his singles match and the United States won back the cup after Seixas and Trabert defeated Hoad and Rosewall in four sets in the doubles rubber.

In a season review editor and former tennis player G.P. Hughes mentioned that "Hoad in particular had a bad year". In a 1956 interview, Hoad admitted that especially in 1954 he often got fed-up with tennis and didn't care whether he played or not. In September, Hoad's world ranking had slipped to No. 7 in Tingay's ranking. Tingay, Chatrier and other writers ranked Hoad world No. 5 in a collaborative ranking. (Note: An alternative ranking compiled by an international team of tennis writers placed Hoad as No. 5.) He was ranked world No. 4 by Ned Potter in World Tennis, which was a higher ranking than Potter had given Hoad in 1953.

==== 1955 ====
Hoad was unable to play the South Australian tennis championship in early January due to a torn ligament. To some surprise he entered the mixed doubles event at the Australian Championships with his girlfriend Jenny Staley and the pair finished as runner-ups to Thelma Coyne Long and George Worthington. In singles, he reached his first Grand Slam final after solid wins over Seixas (quarterfinal) and Hartwig (semifinal), but Rosewall's accuracy and control were too strong for him in the final and he lost in straight sets. Hoad won the Northern Suburbs tournament in Sydney in February against Geoff Brown. and defeated Rosewall in the final of the N.S.W. Hardcourt Championships in March. Hoad did not participate in the French Championships as the Australian Davis Cup team only left for Europe at the end of May. In the final of the Queen's Club Championship in mid-June Hoad, who was married earlier that day to Jenny, lost his service seven times and the match to Rosewall in two sets. He won the doubles event partnering Hartwig. Hoad was the fourth-seeded player at Wimbledon. In quarterfinals against seventh-seeded Budge Patty, his game lacked accuracy and he lost in straight sets.

Having lost the Davis Cup in 1954, Australia had to play through the 1955 Davis Cup preliminary rounds to challenge holders United States. In July, Australia defeated Mexico, Brazil and Canada to win the Americas Zone and subsequently beat Japan and Italy in the Inter-zone matches. In the Challenge Round at the West Side Tennis Club, Forest Hills in late August, Hoad defeated the French and Wimbledon champion Trabert in four sets in his first singles rubber and with Hartwig won the doubles match to reclaim the Davis Cup for Australia. These were the first ever tennis matches televised in colour, on the first national colour broadcast by NBC.

Hoad was no. 2 foreign seed at the U.S. Championships held on the muddy courts of Forest Hills from 2 to 11 September, immediately after the Davis Cup Challenge Round. In the semi-final, he lost his service three times in succession in the third set and suffered a straight-sets defeat against Trabert, the first-seeded U.S. player and eventual champion. In his first significant tournament after the U.S. Championships, Hoad won the New South Wales Championships in November against Rosewall in the final. In December, he won the title at the Victorian Championships after a tough five-sets final against 19-year old Ashley Cooper.

In September 1955, he was ranked No. 3 in the world by Tingay, and No. 3 for 1955 by Ned Potter in World Tennis.

==== 1956 ====
Hoad started 1956 with a five-set defeat in the final of the South Australian Championships against countryman Neale Fraser. At the following Manly tournament, the crowd overflowed the stands during the final hindering Rosewall's baseline game more than Hoad's attacking style, resulting in a straight-sets win for Hoad in 35 minutes. At the Australian Championships in Brisbane, Hoad defeated Mervyn Rose and Neale Fraser to reach his second consecutive final, where he overcame titleholder Rosewall in four sets to win his first Grand Slam singles title. He also won the doubles title with Rosewall against Don Candy and Mervyn Rose. At the beginning of March, Hoad and his wife left for a private overseas tour, sanctioned but not organised by the Australian tennis federation. Their first stop was Cairo where Hoad won the Egyptian Championships title against Sven Davidson followed by a tournament win in Alexandria against Fred Kovaleski. At Monte Carlo in late March, he was surprisingly beaten by Tony Vincent. In the Australian ranking published in April, reflecting the season until the end of March, Hoad overtook Rosewall as No. 1. Singles titles at the Lebanese Championships in Beirut, Naples and the Connaught Club in Essex followed in April but the month ended with a semifinal loss to Ham Richardson at the British Hard Court Championships.

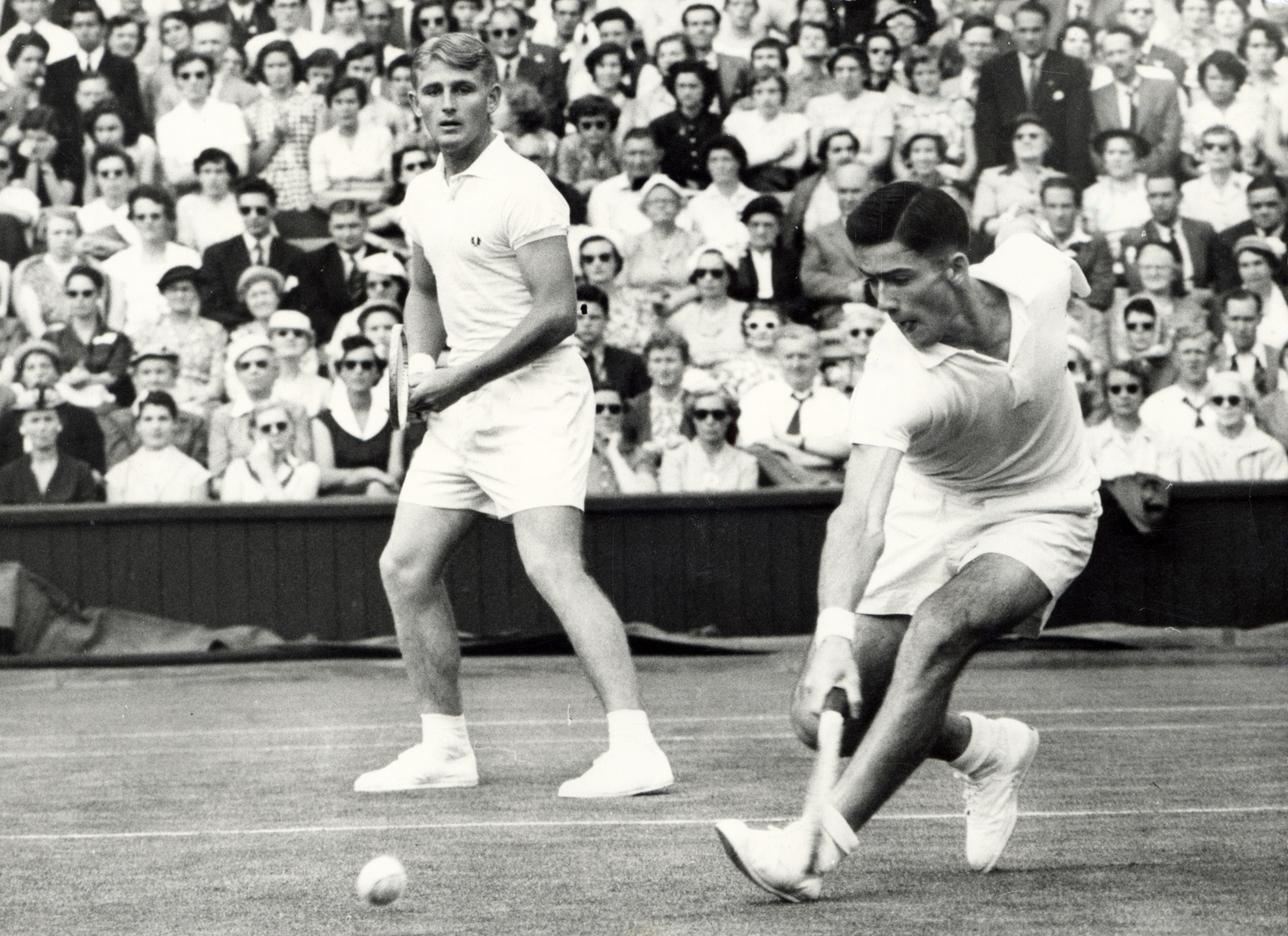
Hoad (left) and Rosewall playing doubles at the Wimbledon Championships in the mid-fifties

Hoad won his first Italian Championships at the Foro Italico in Rome in early May when he outplayed Sven Davidson in straight sets. At the French Championships, Hoad survived a five-set scare against Robert Abdesselam before winning the final against Sven Davidson in straight sets to claim his second consecutive Grand Slam singles title. Unknown to the public, Hoad had stayed up the night previous to the final, invited by a Russian diplomat, and was drunk when he came home. An intensive workout by Rod Laver got him into a state that allowed him to play the final. Following the win, Hoad stated his intention to remain amateur after 1956, "Even if I win the three big tournaments, even if Kramer raised his offer, I still wouldn't turn pro for at least two or three seasons." In May, Hoad won a tournament in Wiesbaden, West Germany against Art Larsen in the final, but at the Trofeo Conde de Godó in Barcelona, he lost in the quarterfinal to Bob Howe. As preparation for Wimbledon, Hoad played at the Northern Championships in Manchester where he lost the final to 34-year old Jaroslav Drobný. Hoad was seeded first at Wimbledon and only lost two sets en route to the final. In the first all-Australian final since 1922, Hoad faced Rosewall and was victorious in four sets to gain his first Wimbledon and third successive Grand Slam title. He also won the doubles event with Rosewall, their third Wimbledon title, defeating Orlando Sirola and Nicola Pietrangeli in the final. After Wimbledon he lost in the semi-final of the Midlands tournament to Mike Davies. In August, Hoad won the German Championships in Hamburg, beating Sirola in the final, but in Munich he lost the final to Budge Patty despite being two sets to love up.

Hoad experienced severe pain and stiffness in his lower back after Wimbledon, at a level higher than before the tournament. He travelled to the U.S. by boat to avoid a long plane trip. The pain, however, continued and reduced the level of his play for the remainder of the year and into 1957.

Hoad and Rosewall won the U.S. Doubles Championships in Brookline in August, completing their career doubles Grand Slam. Having won the first three stages of the singles Grand Slam, Hoad was favoured to complete the Grand Slam at the U.S. Championships and then turn professional for a lucrative contract offered by Jack Kramer. However, he lost the U.S. final in four sets to Rosewall. Hoad and Rosewall won the doubles title against Seixas and Richardson. In September Hoad defeated Sven Davidson in a four-set final at the O'Keefe Invitational in Toronto on clay. At the Pacific Southwest Championships, the last leg of his overseas tour, Hoad was beaten by Alex Olmedo in the third round. In November he lost the final of the Queensland Championships to Ashley Cooper in five sets and was hindered by numbness in the serving arm. In mid December Hoad played Rosewall in the final of the Victorian Championships, their last final as amateurs as Rosewall turned professional at the end of the month. The final, played over two days due to rain and darkness, was won by Rosewall. In late December, Hoad was part of the Davis Cup team which defended the Cup in the Challenge Round against the United States. He was confined to bed with back pain for the two days prior to the Davis Cup matches. In his last Davis Cup appearance, Hoad won both his singles rubbers, against Herbie Flam and Seixas, as well as his doubles match with Rosewall to help Australia to a 5–0 victory.

Hoad was ranked world No. 1 amateur by Lance Tingay in September, by Ned Potter in October in World Tennis and at the end of the year by Tennis de France. Hoad won 16 tournaments in 1956, and 17 doubles titles.

==== 1957 ====
Hoad started the year in Manly where he beat the young American Myron Franks in the final. Hoad was the top-seed at the Australian Championships but lost in the semifinals to Fraser. He played poorly in early 1957, troubled by back pain, and was placed in an upper body cast for six weeks, following which he slowly returned to competition in April. Hoad was defeated in the quarterfinal of the Italian Championships by Mervyn Rose and lost in his first match at the French Championships to Neil Gibson. He won the Northern Championships in Manchester, beating Ramanathan Krishnan in the final. Hoad won his second successive Wimbledon singles title, defeating Ashley Cooper in a straight-sets final that lasted 57 minutes.

=== Professional career: 1957–1973 ===
==== 1957 ====
After winning the 1957 Wimbledon title, Hoad turned professional by signing a two-year contract with Kramer for a record guarantee of US$125,000, or AUS£55,500, which included a US$25,000 bonus for winning the 1957 Wimbledon singles title. This was the highest guarantee that would be given to an amateur turning pro, with Laver receiving the second highest. Hoad's business relationship with Kramer in 1957 and later was congenial and smooth compared to the experiences of Pancho Gonzales. Hoad would later claim, "I never had a problem with Jack Kramer."

On 14 July 1957, Hoad won his debut match as a professional against Frank Sedgman at the Forest Hills Tournament of Champions, broadcast live nationally on the CBS network. He won his next match, against Pancho Segura, but lost the last three to finish joint third in the round robin event behind Gonzales and Sedgman. After Forest Hills, Hoad commented on the difference between amateur and professional tennis: "It's an entirely different league. These pros make mistakes but they don't make them on vital points. That's the difference.". At the following L.A. Masters round robin tournament played on cement courts at the Los Angeles Tennis Club he lost all six of his matches to finish in last place, commenting "I don't like cement courts...". After these defeats Kramer commented that Hoad would have to change his playing style: "His second serve is too shallow. His opponents massacre it. He must shorten his backhand or play deeper in his returning service." Kramer stated that there was a psychological factor connected with Hoad's defeats "as he never has done well on these courts in Los Angeles and thinks they are his jinx."

In September Hoad embarked on a four-month four-man tour of Europe, Africa, the Middle East, Asia, and Australia together with Kramer (replaced by Sedgman in Australia), Rosewall, and Segura. In a Kramer and Hoad interview on BBC television Kramer cited Hoad's recent marathon win over Rosewall at The Hague on red clay as evidence of improvement in his play. At the Wembley Indoor Pro Championships in late September, Kramer eliminated Hoad in straight sets. In the four-man tour Hoad finished with slight edges over Rosewall (16–15), Kramer (16–14), Segura (13–9) and Sedgman (4–2). Hoad was ranked combined world No. 3 behind Gonzales and Sedgman and ahead of Rosewall and Segura for 1957 by Quist.

==== 1958 ====
In 1958 a projected series of 100 head-to-head matches was commenced between Hoad and the reigning champion of professional tennis, Pancho Gonzales, together with an undercard series between Trabert and Segura. The series started in January in a number of Australian cities in stadiums on grass courts with mostly a best-of-five set format, and in New Zealand for three matches with a best-of-three set format. At the end of the Australasian subtour, Hoad was leading 8 to 5. Most venues reported record crowds, including the first Kooyong encounter, which Hoad won in a 3 and 3/4 hour, four-sets, 80-games marathon in front of 12,000 spectators. From 5 to 4 down in New Zealand, Hoad had a 15 to 3 winning streak against Gonzales (including the non-tour Kooyong Tournament of Champions deciding match and the third-place match at Sydney Masters). In February, the series continued in the United States, mostly in indoor venues and local gyms with a best-of-three set format, played on a portable canvas surface. Hoad would experience a thigh injury in May and June. Hoad won 18 of the first 27 matches, and in late February Gonzales had, according to Kramer, the look of a "beaten man". However, after they played an outdoor match on 1 March on a chilly night in Palm Springs, Hoad's back stiffened which affected him for the rest of the series. Twice Hoad was forced to take time off to rest his back and was substituted for in his absence by Rosewall and Trabert. From 9–18 Gonzales surged to a 26–23 lead, and at the end of the series on 8 June, he had defeated Hoad by 51 matches to 36.

In late 1958, Kramer was asked which of the many "World Professional Championships" tournaments he considered deserving of the title, and he named four tournaments under his own aegis: Forest Hills, L.A. Masters, Kooyong and Sydney White City. Hoad won three of these eight tournaments in 1958/59. For the 1958/1959 seasons, Kramer had a troupe of professional champions that included 11 Hall of Fame players, (Note: The 11 members of the International Tennis Hall of Fame on the 1959/60 Ampol world series, all of whom won major singles titles, were Hoad, Gonzales, Rosewall, Sedgman, Trabert, Segura, Anderson, Cooper, Rose, McGregor, Olmedo) under contract, and he designed a series of tournaments to provide a format in which all of them could participate. In January 1958, Hoad won all five of his matches in the round-robin Tournament of Champions in Kooyong, funded by the Australian oil company Ampol. During the world championship tour in the U.S. in May, the four players participated in the Cleveland World Pro event. Hoad lost a two-set lead in the final against Gonzales while struggling with his leg-muscle injury. Hoad briefly dropped out of the tour in late May to rest his thigh injury. At the Forest Hills Tournament of Champions in mid June, he won against Gonzales on the final day, but finished fourth in the round-robin event. At the L.A. Masters in late June Hoad again lost all six of his matches to finish last. At Roland Garros in September, Hoad won his quarterfinal against Trabert, and his semifinal against Gonzales. While leading in the final against Rosewall, Hoad wrenched his back reaching for a ball, and could not play well in the remainder of the match. He had to default the Wembley Pro tournament in September due to an "arthritic" back. Hoad rested for the next three months and did not play again until 1959. Jack March ranked Hoad world No. 2 professional tennis player behind Gonzales for 1958. Jack Kramer ranked Hoad No. 4 for 1958, with Gonzales first, Sedgman second, Rosewall third.

==== 1959 ====
In early 1959, it was announced that Ampol (Note: "Caltex" was the name used by the Ampol company from 1997 until 2020. The company then officially rebranded as "Ampol Ltd." in May 2020.) would provide an award of AUS£2,500 (US$5,600) to the "acknowledged world's best tennis player", adjudged from a world series of tournaments (Note: According to the Kramer Tour brochure for 1959, the 15 tournaments were Melbourne (Olympic Velodrome) (10 Jan), Brisbane (20 Jan), Perth (26 Jan), Sydney (Marks Athletic Field) (4 Feb), Adelaide (Norwood Cricket Oval) (11 Feb), L.A. Masters (L.A. Tennis Club) (5 Jun), Toronto (Toronto Lawn Tennis Club) (16 Jun), New York City (Forest Hills) (23 Jun), Paris (Roland Garros) (8 Sep), London (Wembley) (19 Sep), Perth (26 Nov), Adelaide (Memorial Drive Tennis Club) (1 Dec), Sydney (White City) (8 Dec), Brisbane (Milton Courts) (15 Dec), Melbourne (Kooyong) (26 Dec)) managed by Kramer. The players would be ranked by a point system, (Note: The 13 players on the 1959 Ampol Open Trophy world series of tournaments were Hoad, Gonzales, Rosewall, Sedgman, Trabert, Anderson, Segura, Cooper, Rose, McGregor, Hartwig, Olmedo, Giammalva) which would determine the seeding list for the tournaments. The first five tournaments of the series were played in Australia on a portable outdoor wooden plywood court. Hoad began the series slowly, hampered by an elbow injury. At the end of January, Hoad defeated Cooper to win at Perth and in February 1959, he defeated Rosewall in three sets to win the South Australian Pro in Adelaide. This gave Hoad the lead in the Ampol points standings after the first group of five tournaments.

In the four-man 1959 Kramer World Professional Championship Tour, which ran from February to May in North America, Hoad built a lead of 12 to 5 in his series of matches against Gonzales in late April. Gonzales stated that "I had blisters under my blisters from the punishment" on that tour. However, the daily grind of the tour began to cause a renewal of Hoad's back trouble, and he finally won against Gonzales by 15 matches to 13. He also won his head-to-head's with newly turned pro Ashley Cooper (18–2) and Mal Anderson (9–5). With a win–loss record of 42–20 he finished second in the four-man tour behind Gonzales (47–15). The championship was based on money won. This would be the only 4-man world professional championship tour in which the winner would have a losing record against one of the other players, and the second-place finisher would have winning records against all of the other players. Four-man world championship tours were held in 1942, 1954, 1959, and 1960. In late April the players in the 4-man tour played in the Cleveland event, and Hoad lost the final to Gonzales in three straight sets.

At the L.A. Masters round robin from 5–14 June Hoad and Gonzales both finished with five wins and one loss, but Gonzales won the title on account of their head-to-head result. During the tournament, Hoad received several Hollywood offers for screen tests, but turned them down with the comment "What do I want with money?". At the O'Keefe Pro Championships on clay at Toronto Lawn Tennis Club from 16 to 21 June, Hoad lost to Sedgman in the semifinal.

The Forest Hills Tournament of Champions from 23 to 28 June, played on grass at the Forest Hills stadium in New York, awarded the largest winners' cheques of the season. Hoad defeated Mal Anderson in the quarterfinal, Rosewall in the semifinal in four sets and Gonzales in the final, also in four sets, to claim the title. Gonzales appeared tired near the end of the match, but had declared in an interview prior to the final, "I feel fit, very fit. Until Hoad beats me, I'm not worried." In the August 1959 issue of World Tennis, Riggs wrote of the Forest Hills final, "the match signified the end of an era. The great Gonzales who had dominated professional tennis for four years had been decisively beaten..."

In August 1959, Hoad reached the final of the Slazenger Pro Championships in Eastbourne, but lost to Cooper. In September, Hoad lost to Sedgman in the semifinal of the French Pro at Roland Garros, but defeated Rosewall in a playoff for third place. At the Wembley Indoor Championships, Hoad was upset by Segura in the second round. In the Grand Prix de Europe tour from August to October, which excluded Roland Garros and Wembley, Hoad finished in third place behind Sedgman and Rosewall (Gonzales defaulted the European tour).

Hoad won the Perth and Adelaide Memorial Drive events in November and December to begin the final group of Ampol tournaments, which were played on grass courts in tennis stadiums. At the Sydney White City Tournament of Champions from 8–13 December, Hoad lost the final to Gonzales in straight sets. At Brisbane Milton Courts from 15 to 19 December, Rosewall defeated Hoad in the semifinal and Gonzales in the final in long matches. The final event of the series, the Qantas International Kooyong Championships at Melbourne, began on 26 December 1959. With a victory at Kooyong, either Hoad or Gonzales would have won the series. Gonzales decided to return to the US for the holidays to be with his fiancée, thereby defaulting the series to Hoad. On 24 December, the day following Gonzales' departure, Hoad announced that he would not participate in the upcoming 4-man tour in January 1960. On 2 January 1960, Hoad defeated Rosewall in a three-and-a-half hour, four-set match to win the Kooyong tournament, (Note: Hoad and Rosewall both had a 4–1 win–loss record but Hoad finished first due to his win over Rosewall.) a match which Kramer acclaimed as one of the best ever played. With Hoad's successful defence of the Kooyong title also came the Ampol Open Trophy win and bonus money award.

The Ampol Open Trophy "world series" or "world's open tennis championship" (it was named "open" in case open tennis arrived) consisted of 15 tournaments around the world between 10 January 1959 and 2 January 1960. Hoad finished first in the series with 51 bonus points, ahead of Gonzales (43 points) and Rosewall (41 points). (Note: Final Ampol Points List: L. Hoad (51) P. Gonzales (43) K. Rosewall (41) F. Sedgman (32) T. Trabert (25) P. Segura (14) M. Anderson (14) A. Cooper (8) Olmedo (1) M. Rose (1) Hartwig (0) McGregor (0) Giammalva (0)) (Note: Hoad won six of the 15 tournaments and 71% (36/51) of his matches in the series, while Gonzales won four tournaments and 72% (26/36) of his matches, and Rosewall won two tournaments and 62% (26/42) of his matches in the series. Sedgman (Melbourne), Trabert (Roland Garros) and Anderson (Wembley) each won one Ampol world series tournament. Gonzales defaulted three Ampol tournaments, and played 15 fewer matches than Hoad. Hoad was three wins and five losses in matches against Gonzales in the Ampol series, although Hoad and Gonzales were two wins and two losses against each other in tournament deciding matches. Hoad won six of his eight matches against Rosewall on the Ampol series.) The Melbourne Age stated, Hoad "was crowned the new world professional tournament champion at Kooyong" by winning the Ampol world series. The Sydney Morning Herald reported that Hoad had won "the title of world's top professional tennis player" and was "the game's top money-earner" for 1959. French language L'Impartial on 6 January 1960 stated "Lewis Hoad world champion", the win at Kooyong "allows him at the same time to claim the world title for 1959". In an advertisement in World Tennis magazine in June 1960, Hoad was described as "world champion". Kramer's brochure described the Ampol series with the term "World Championship Tennis". There had also been references of Gonzales between January and April 1960 being described variously that he was "world professional tennis champion, will defend his title", was advertised as "World Pro Champion", was "world professional champion", "goes after an unprecedented sixth straight world crown", was "perennial professional champion", was described in UPI newswire reports as "world professional tennis champion since 1954", "titleholder" of the "world professional tennis championship" and that Gonzales with "five world series championships as his record, defeated Ken Rosewall at Cairns last night in straight sets and added further to his claims for his sixth successive world title". On 15 January 1960, Lawn Tennis and Badminton said Hoad was taking a six-month rest and the article stated "J. Kramer is urging Hoad not to take this step, as during this year he will have his best chance of taking R. A. Gonzales' world professional title from him".

Kramer's office reported that in 1959 Hoad had won his personal series of matches against Gonzales 24 to 23.

Kramer placed Hoad in fourth place in his personal world professional rating for 1959, the same ranking which Kramer awarded to Hoad in 1958 and 1960. Jack March ranked Hoad second behind Gonzales for 1959, the same ranking which he had given Hoad for 1958. Robert Roy in the French sportspaper L'Équipe ranked Hoad fifth as of mid-December, behind Gonzales, Sedgman, Rosewall, and Trabert. Kramer's Australian agent Bob Barnes placed Hoad in first spot with Gonzales second and Rosewall third. Mal Anderson, in a conversation in World Tennis, recalled that "Kramer established a point system to decide the best players...Lew finished ahead of Pancho" followed by Rosewall, Sedgman, and Trabert.

==== 1960 ====
Hoad decided not to play in the 4-man 1960 world championship tour and took a three-month layoff at the beginning of 1960 to rest his back and spend time with his family. When he returned to play, he was rusty, slow, and carried some extra weight, but he gradually recovered his form. He won a New Zealand tour in April, over Anderson, Sedgman, and Cooper. In May, Hoad commenced his participation in Kramer's tournament series for 1960, which used a point system to rank the players. Gonzales withdrew from the tournament series just before it began. Hoad lost a five-set final to Rosewall at the Melbourne Olympic Pool where a court was set up on the drained pool floor. Hoad, Rosewall, and most of the pros did not play in the Cleveland World Pro which, as in 1959, was not a part of Kramer's tournament series. However, Hoad and Trabert played a match in Cincinnati, Trabert's home town, won by Hoad, just before the Cleveland event, where Trabert would be runner-up to Olmedo. Hoad won tournament finals in June at Santa Barbara, California and in September at Geneva, Switzerland, both over Rosewall, but appeared out of condition in the Roland Garros final against Rosewall. At the Wembley Indoor Championships that year, Hoad was again upset by Segura in the second round. In late 1960, Hoad won the inaugural Japanese Professional Championships in Tokyo, beating Rosewall, Cooper, and Gimeno. The event drew 7,000 fans for each of the four evenings of play, with the Crown Prince and Princess in attendance the first evening. In the final, Hoad prevailed at 13–11 in the fifth set over Rosewall, saving three match points. Following the marathon Tokyo final, Hoad withdrew from the remaining tournaments in the point series with back trouble, and the final projected tournament in Australia was not played. The final results of Kramer's tournament series for 1960 are unknown. Hoad and Gonzales did not play against each other in 1960. Hoad was ranked world No. 2 professional tennis player behind Gonzales in a newspaper report.

==== 1961 ====
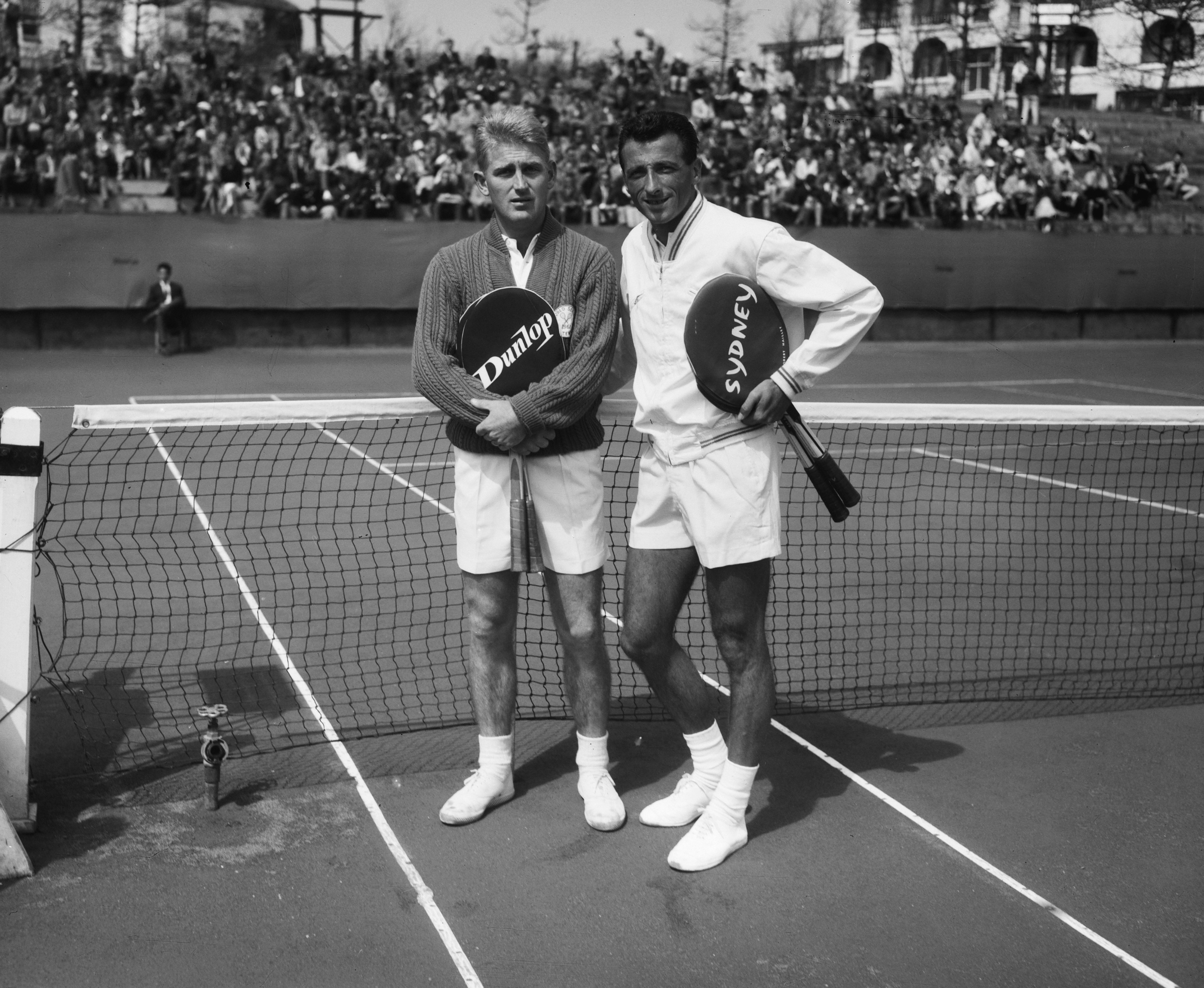
Hoad and Robert Haillet (right) at the Professional Championship in Noordwijk, Netherlands in August 1961

Hoad played a few one-set matches on the 1961 Professional World Series tour in January, but soon withdrew because of a broken left foot and was substituted for by first Trabert and then Sedgman. He finished fourth in a tour of five Soviet cities in July, behind Trabert, Buchholz, and Segura, returning to play after his foot had healed. In late August and September, Hoad and Gonzales played a ten-match best-of-three sets tour of Britain and Ireland, with Buchholz and Davies playing the undercard matches. Hoad won his series against Gonzales by a score of six matches to four. Hoad won four of the five matches in the series which were played on grass. In September, Hoad lost in the first round of the French Pro to Luis Ayala. At the Wembley Pro, Hoad defeated Gonzales in a four-set semifinal. In the final against Rosewall, in the second game of the match, Hoad pulled his back while running for a backhand volley and suffered a recurrence of his old back injury, and could no longer run, losing in four sets. In November, Hoad won the fifth and deciding rubber for Australia against the United States in the final of the inaugural Kramer Cup (the pro equivalent of the Davis Cup) by beating Trabert in four sets. Trabert said afterwards: "Trying to stop Lew in that final set was like fighting a machine gun with a rubber knife". Robert Roy in L'Équipe ranked Hoad as the third-best player of the year. In July 1961 Gardnar Mulloy rated Hoad as world No. 1 ahead of Gonzales, and the favourite to win a prospective open Wimbledon.

==== 1962 ====
There was no official pro championship tour in 1962, as Laver and Emerson had declined to accept pro offers made by Kramer at the 1961 Wimbledon. Kramer resigned as tour promoter and director. From 14 to 17 March 1962, Hoad won the Adelaide Professional Championships, beating Rosewall, Gimeno, and Sedgman, the final against Rosewall very close. In late August, Hoad played a five-match, best-of-three sets tour in Britain against Trabert, defeating Trabert at Nottingham, Edinburgh, Bournemouth, and Dublin, while Trabert won at Scarborough. Hoad won the professional tournament in Zürich in September 1962 by a win in the final against Pancho Segura. In late September, Hoad lost to Rosewall in a 3 1/4-hour, four-set final at Wembley. Hoad and Rosewall teamed to win the doubles final at both Roland Garros and Wembley. In October, Hoad was awarded the Facis Trophy for winning the pro tour of Italy. In the 1962 Kramer Cup tournament, in best-of-five set formats, Hoad defeated Gimeno in the semifinal tie in Turin, Italy on clay, and Hoad won the opening match of the final at Adelaide in December against Olmedo on grass. In an interview in 1980, Hoad stated that "I finally finished playing seriously, in about 1962". Hoad was voted the world No. 1 professional tennis player for 1962 in a UPI poll of 85 U.S. sports editors held at the end of January 1963 following the Australian tour.

==== 1963 ====
In January 1963, Hoad and Rosewall guaranteed the contract of new pro Rod Laver. Hoad defeated Laver 8–0 (Note: Laver, in statements made in interviews from June 2017 and November 2019, claimed that after turning pro he lost the first 13 matches which he played against Hoad, although he did not specify these as all being part of the 1963 Australian tour. Buchholz (in 2007), who played the undercard on the tour, claimed that Hoad won 13 consecutive matches over Laver. In a book published in 2020, Laver stated "during that Australian tour, I played Lew eight times and he won every match".) in an Australian tour, some of their matches played to best-of-five and televised from sold-out stadiums. On Laver's pro debut on 5 January, Hoad beat Laver at White City stadium in Sydney on a "slippery" grass surface. Their match at the Kooyong stadium in Melbourne on grass was a close contest, with Laver extending Hoad to five sets before losing. After the Australian series, Hoad was inactive for four months, partly due to a shoulder injury. Hoad did not plan to participate in the World Tour for 1963. On his return in June, he lost to Laver in the semifinal of the Adler Pro, and at the Forest Hills U.S. Pro tournament he lost to Buchholz in the first round. The Forest Hills event did not have a television contract, was a financial failure, and the players, with the exception of Gonzales, were not paid. At the French Pro indoor event at Stade Coubertin in September, Hoad was defeated in straight sets by Rosewall in the semifinal and lost the third place play-off against Sedgman. At the Wembley Pro, he reached the final after surviving a marathon semifinal against Buchholz in which he strained his leg muscle and was limping throughout most of the match. McCauley acclaimed the semi-final with Buchholz "one of the best contests ever staged at Wembley". Hoad was tired and sluggish in the final, which again he lost to Rosewall, this time in four sets. At the Tokyo Japanese Pro in November, Hoad defeated Rosewall in the preliminary round, but lost the third place match to Sedgman, Buchholz defeating Laver in the final. At the end of the World Championship Tour earlier in the season, Laver had finished second and was officially ranked the No. 2 professional player behind Rosewall. Hoad did not play in the World Tour, and was not officially ranked.

==== 1964–67 ====
In February and March 1964, Hoad played a 16-day 24-match best-of-three sets tour of New Zealand with Laver, Rosewall, and Anderson. Hoad and Laver both finished on top with seven wins and five losses, but Hoad won first place with a 3 to 1 head-to-head score against Laver. In late September 1964, Hoad and Gonzales played a four match best-of-three sets head-to-head series in Britain, at Brighton, Carlyon Bay (Cornwall), Cardiff (Wales), and Glasgow (Scotland). Hoad won at Carlyon Bay and Cardiff, while Gonzales won at Brighton and Glasgow. Hoad finished in sixth place in the tournament series point system. In early 1965, half an inch of bone was removed from his right big toe, and he was only able to play a limited schedule thereafter. Hoad won his final victories against Laver in January 1966 at White City in Sydney, his home town, defeating him in straight sets, and at Forest Hills, New York in a round robin match in June 1966.

After the expiration of his seven-year contract on 14 November 1966, Hoad withdrew from competitive play for ten months. Hoad and his wife invested in the construction and development of a tennis club resort and a related residential complex in southern Spain. He returned unexpectedly to participate in the Wimbledon Pro tournament in late August 1967. The Wimbledon Pro was a three-day BBC televised tournament organised by the All-England Club as a trial for "open" tennis and as such the first Wimbledon tournament open to male professional tennis players. Hoad was one of the eight players invited for the singles event and despite being in semi-retirement and without competitive play for ten months, he won his first match against Gonzales in three sets. The BBC television commentator called it "the finest match ever seen on these hallowed grounds." This would be the last match on grass between Hoad and Gonzales, with Hoad holding a lifetime edge on grass over Gonzales of 21 matches to 14. With little energy left he lost the semifinal to Rosewall in two straight sets. Hoad played for an eight-week period on the pro tour in 1967, and then retired permanently from regular competitive tennis play.

==== Open Era 1968–1973 ====
Back problems plagued Hoad throughout his career and forced his retirement from the tennis tour in October 1967 but the advent of the Open Era in April 1968 enticed him to make sporadic appearances at tournaments. Hoad reached the semi-final of the Kent Championships in June 1968, losing in two sets to Roy Emerson. He lost in the final of the Irish Championships at Dublin in July to Tom Okker in straight sets, hampered by a thigh injury. In November 1969, Hoad won the Dewar Cup Aberavon singles title, part of the Dewar Cup indoor circuit, defeating Bob Hewitt in the final in straight sets. At the 1970 Italian Open, he lost in the third round to Alex Metreveli. At the 1970 French Open, he defeated Charlie Pasarell in four close sets, and reached the fourth round before succumbing to eventual finalist Željko Franulović. At Wimbledon that year he lost in the second round to Ismail El Shafei.

Hoad won his final tournament singles title on 7 August 1971, the Playmon Fiesta 71, on clay at Benidorm, Spain. He defeated Antonio Muñoz in the semifinal and Manuel Santana in the final. It marked a twenty-year span during which Hoad won singles titles in tennis, between the ages of 16 and 36, dating back to the Brisbane tournament of August 1951. In spring 1972, Hoad played the doubles final at Italian Open with Frew McMillan against Ilie Năstase and Ion Țiriac. Hoad/McMillan led 2–0 in sets but retired at 3–5 down in the fifth set in protest of the poor light conditions and the antics of the Romanian pair. In June he was a doubles finalist at the Bristol Open, partnering Clark Graebner. At the end of June, at the age of 37, Hoad made his final Wimbledon appearance losing in the first round to Jürgen Fassbender in four sets. Hoad's final match was a second round loss as a result of a retirement to Fassbender in Johannesburg in November 1973.

From 1970 to 1974, Hoad was the coach of the Spanish Davis Cup team.

According to notes for a 1970 British Pathé documentary film about Hoad's tennis ranch, Hoad had "made about GBP 350,000 as a professional". Per a 1977 newspaper interview, "Throughout his career, Hoad earned a total of £250,000, less than many pros collect in a year now. He received £150 for his Wimbledon victories; the payoff now is £17,500."

== Playing style ==
Strength of arm and wrist played an important part in Hoad's game, as he often drove for winners rather than rallying and waiting for the "right" opportunity, though he also had the skill to win the French Championships on the slower clay court. Hoad played right-handed and had a powerful serve and groundstrokes. Hoad's game was reported to lack consistency in some accounts. At times Hoad had difficulty maintaining concentration. According to Kramer, "Hoad had the loosest game of any good kid I ever saw. There was absolutely no pattern to his game.... He was the only player I ever saw who could stand six or seven feet behind the baseline and snap the ball back hard, crosscourt. He'd try for winners off everything, off great serves, off tricky short balls, off low volleys. He hit hard overspin drives, and there was no way you could ever get him to temporise on important points."

Hoad was runner-up for the Australian junior table tennis championship in 1951, and developed strong wrists and arms through heavy weight-lifting regimes. Hoad would use wrist strength in his strokes to make last split-second changes in racquet direction. He would saw off about an inch from the ends of his racquet handles, which were short to begin with, and move the grip higher to wield his racquets as if they were ping-pong bats. Hoad would use wrist action to give heavy topspin to his groundstrokes.

== Personal life ==
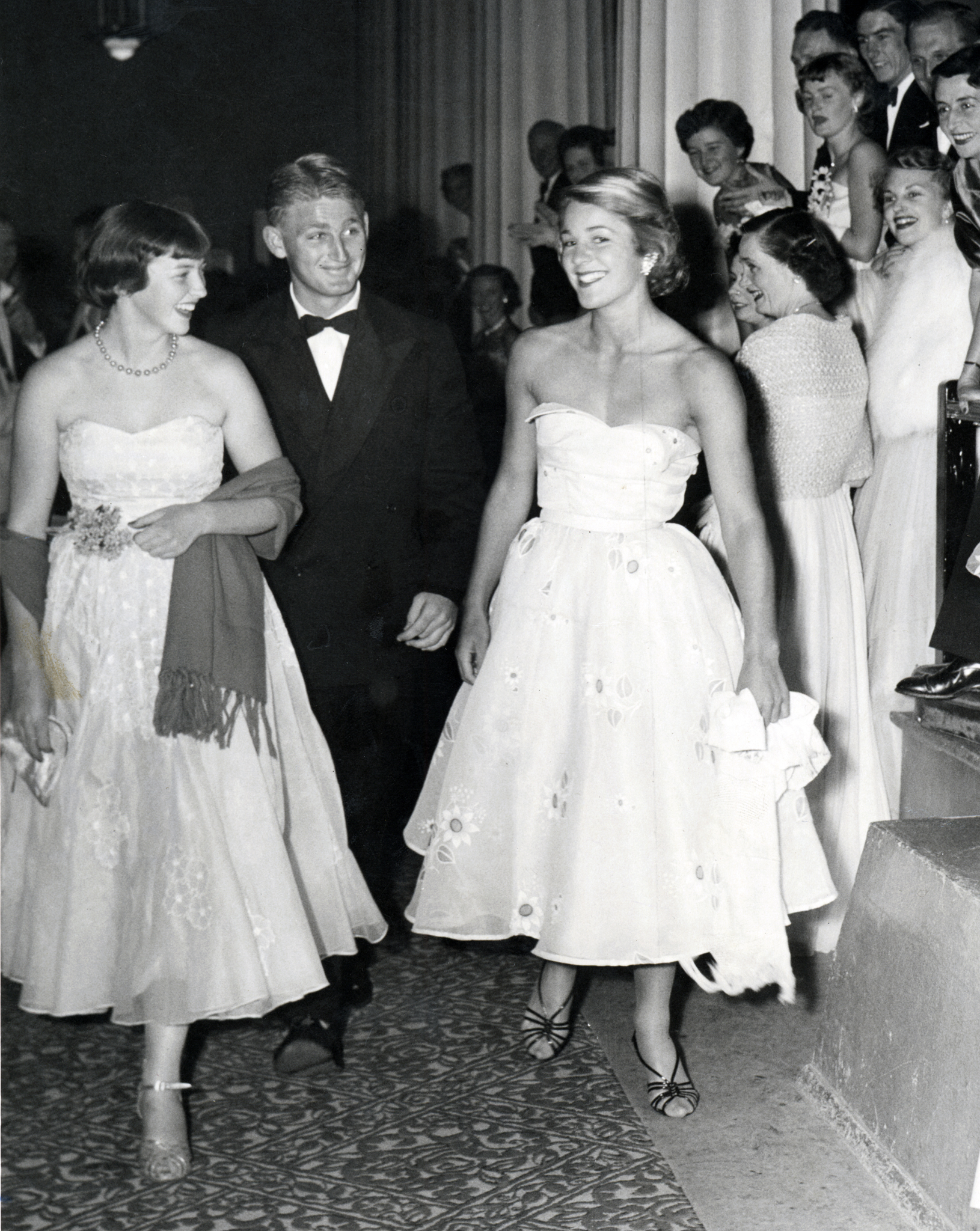
Hoad and Jennifer Staley (right) at the Davis Cup Ball on 30 December 1953

Hoad proposed to his girlfriend, Australian tennis player Jenny Staley, on her 21st birthday party in March 1955 and they planned to announce their engagement in June in London while both were on an overseas tour. After arrival in London Jenny discovered that she was pregnant and the couple decided to get married straight away. The marriage took place the following day on 18 June 1955 at St Mary's Church, Wimbledon, in London, on the eve of Wimbledon fortnight. They had two daughters and a son.

After announcing his retirement in 1967, due to persistent back problems, Hoad moved to Fuengirola, Spain, near Málaga, where he and his wife constructed, owned and operated a tennis resort, Lew Hoad's Campo de Tenis, which officially opened in October 1971. For more than thirty years they entertained personal friends such as actors Stewart Granger, Sean Connery, Richard Burton, Peter Ustinov, Deborah Kerr and her husband writer Peter Viertel, actor Kirk Douglas, singer Frank Sinatra and saxophonist Stan Getz. Hoad's son Peter stated, "My dad was extremely well connected." The athletic club, including the wedding/event facilities, were acquired by Spanish investors in 2005. The Lew Hoad Club currently has seven tennis courts and six paddle courts, outdoor pool and gym. An annual IBP women's tournament is held.

In September 1978, Hoad's back problem was successfully treated with spinal fusion surgery, and he was relieved of pain. There had been two ruptured discs and a herniation. The doctor asked one of Hoad's friends, "How on earth did this man walk, let alone play tennis?" In a 1980 interview, Hoad claimed that "my back is marvelous now....it's absolutely perfect now."

Hoad was diagnosed with a rare and incurable form of leukaemia on 13 January 1994 which caused his death on 3 July 1994. Press reports of a heart attack were incorrect. Hoad's personal physician specialist was his own son-in-law Dr. Manuel Benavides. A book co-written with Jack Pollard and titled My Game ("The Lew Hoad story" in the US) was published in 1958. In 2002, Pollard teamed up with his widow, Jenny, to write My Life With Lew.

Jenny Staley Hoad died in Fuengirola, Spain on 14 February 2024, at the age of 89.

== Tennis legacy and assessment ==
Hoad is considered one of the greatest tennis players of all time.

He won four major singles titles (Australian, French, and two Wimbledon championships), falling one win short of a Grand Slam in 1956, before turning professional in July of 1957. As a professional Hoad was ineligible to play at the four Grand Slam events from 1957–1968. While he won no professional majors he did win two Tournament of Champions titles in 1958 and 1959. Back troubles plagued him for most of his pro career, though he had several great seasons. In 1956, Hoad's overall win–loss was 114–15 In 1958 he won 64 of 155 matches. In the 1959 Ampol Open Trophy tournament series, Hoad's winning percentage was 71% (36–15) compared to Gonzales' 72% (26–10) For the 1959 season as a whole, Hoad had a 24 to 23 edge in wins against Pancho Gonzales, a result which surpasses any other opponent of Gonzales during his world champion years.

On the head-to-head tours of the era (1958, 1959, 1961), Hoad was 57–68 against Gonzales, the best head-to-head showing of any pro against the reigning champion Gonzales. Hoad's results declining after 1961. Against Ken Rosewall, Hoad was 15–18 on grass and 17–21 on clay Though some records are lost, lifetime on all surfaces, primarily indoor, Hoad trails Gonzales 78–104 and Rosewall 51–84.

Hoad was also a dominant doubles player. He won nine Grand Slam tournament doubles titles, including one mixed doubles title, and a Career Grand Slam in doubles. Hoad won 21 major doubles titles over 14 seasons (eight Grand Slam tournaments, thirteen Pro Slam tournaments), a pre-Open era record, shared with Rosewall. He also won the 1959 Forest Hills TOC doubles title. In comparison, Rosewall won 24 major doubles titles over 20 seasons, and Mike Bryan won 18 over 15 seasons.

Sportswriter Lance Tingay ranked Hoad fifth behind Tilden, Budge, Laver and Gonzales. Max Robertson, tennis author and commentator, rated Hoad as the best post-war Wimbledon player in 1981 In 100 Greatest of All Time, a 2012 television series broadcast by the Tennis Channel, Hoad was ranked the 19th greatest male player In 2016, tennis journalist Richard Evans stated that in his judgment Hoad was the greatest player in the world before the emergence of Federer, and "was without question the strongest man who ever played the game."

Former players also tell of Hoad's prowess on the court. Fred Perry ranked him fifth in the modern era in 1983. Don Budge stated, "If Lew Hoad was on, you may as well just go home or have tea, because you weren’t going to beat him." Jack Kramer also said Hoad was a great player but lacked consistency because of physical issues. Kramer said "When Lew felt like playing, man, he was really something" Harry Hopman commented on Hoad's erratic performance during his amateur career, stating "He had many more bad patches than periods of top form." Kramer also said Hoad was universally liked on tour. Pancho Gonzales and Ken Rosewall also give testament to the fact Hoad was one of the greatest. Gonzales said in 1995 that his volleys, overhead, and mind were great and "He was the only guy who, if I was playing my best tennis, could still beat me." Gonzales also said "If there was ever a Universe Davis Cup, and I had to pick one man to represent Planet Earth, I would pick Lew Hoad in his prime." Frew McMillan, Gordon Forbes, and Rod Laver give similar accolades.

Hoad gave his own rankings in a 1980 interview, ranking Emerson and Borg at the top in terms of major tournaments won. However, Hoad claimed that "the only way to really assess players is to play them", rating Gonzales as the best player of those whom he had played against.

== Honours ==
Hoad was inducted into the International Tennis Hall of Fame in Newport, in 1980 and in December 1985 was inducted into the Sport Australia Hall of Fame. In January 1995 he was posthumously inducted into the Tennis Australia Hall of Fame together with friend and rival Ken Rosewall.

The ITF organised a seniors tournament in his honour called The Lew Hoad Memorial ITF Veterans Tournament, which was hosted by the Lew Hoad Campo de Tenis. The Kooyong Classic at Kooyong Stadium, the principal warm-up event for the Australian Open, awards the Lew Hoad Memorial Trophy to the winner of the men's singles. Kooyong stadium was the site of some of Hoad's greatest victories.

The Lewis Hoad Reserve in Sydney and the Lew Hoad Avenue in Baton Rouge, Louisiana are named after him.

== Performance timeline ==
Key
W	F	SF	QF	#R	RR	Q#	DNQ	A	NH

(W) winner; (F) finalist; (SF) semifinalist; (QF) quarterfinalist; (#R) rounds 4, 3, 2, 1; (RR) round-robin stage; (Q#) qualification round; (DNQ) did not qualify; (A) absent; (NH) not held; (SR) strike rate (events won / competed); (W–L) win–loss record.

=== Singles ===
Hoad joined the professional tennis circuit in 1957 and as a consequence was banned from competing in 42 Grand Slam tournaments until the start of the Open Era at the 1968 French Open.

	1951	1952	1953	1954	1955	1956	1957	1958	1959	1960	1961	1962	1963	1964	1965	1966	1967	1968	1969	1970	1971	1972	SR	W–L	Win %
Grand Slam tournaments																							4 / 26	84–22	79%
Australian	2R	3R	2R	A	F	W	SF	not eligible											A	A	A	A	1 / 6	15–5	75%
French	A	2R	QF	4R	A	W	3R	not eligible										A	A	4R	A	A	1 / 6	16–5	76%
Wimbledon	A	4R	QF	QF	QF	W	W	not eligible										3R	A	2R	A	1R	2 / 9	32–7	82%
U.S.	A	QF	SF	QF	SF	F	not eligible											A	A	A	A	A	0 / 5	21–5	81%
Pro Slam tournaments																							0 / 22	30–22	58%
U.S. Pro	A	A	A	A	A	A	A	F	F	A	A	A	QF	QF	A	QF	A						0 / 5	6–5	55%
French Pro	NH	NH	NH	NH	NH	A	NH	F	SF	F	1R	1R	SF	QF	A	A	QF						0 / 8	12–8	60%
Wembley Pro	A	A	A	NH	NH	A	QF	A	QF	QF	F	F	F	QF	A	SF	1R						0 / 9	12–9	57%
Win–loss	1–1	8–4	13–4	10–3	12–3	24–1	10–3	5–2	5–3	3–2	3–2	3–2	5–3	2–3	0–0	3–2	1–2	2–1	0–0	4–2	0–0	0–1	4 / 48	114–44	72%

=== Doubles ===
Grand Slam Tournament	Amateur							Pro	Open Era									Titles / Played
Grand Slam Tournament	1951	1952	1953	1954	1955	1956	1957	1957–1967	1968	1969	1970	1971	1972	1973	1974	1975	1976	Titles / Played
Australian	A	QF	W	A	F	W	W	not eligible		A	A	A	A	A	A	A	A	3 / 5
French	A	SF	W	F	A	F	SF	not eligible	A	A	3R	A	3R	A	A	A	A	1 / 7
Wimbledon	A	SF	W	SF	W	W	F	not eligible	2R	A	2R	A	3R	A	2R	A	1R	3 / 11
U.S.	A	SF	QF	F	A	W	A	not eligible	A	A	A	A	A	A	A	A	A	1 / 4
Total:																		8 / 28

== Grand Slam and Pro Slam finals ==
=== Singles ===
==== Grand Slam finals (4–2) ====
Result	Year	Championship	Surface	Opponent	Score
Loss	1955	Australian Championships	Grass	(Australia) Ken Rosewall	7–9, 4–6, 4–6
Win	1956	Australian Championships	Grass	(Australia) Ken Rosewall	6–4, 3–6, 6–4, 7–5
Win	1956	French Championships	Clay	(Sweden) Sven Davidson	6–4, 8–6, 6–3
Win	1956	Wimbledon	Grass	(Australia) Ken Rosewall	6–2, 4–6, 7–5, 6–4
Loss	1956	US Championships	Grass	(Australia) Ken Rosewall	6–4, 2–6, 3–6, 3–6
Win	1957	Wimbledon	Grass	(Australia) Ashley Cooper	6–2, 6–1, 6–2

==== Pro Slam finals (0–7) ====
Result	Year	Championship	Surface	Opponent	Score
Loss	1958	French Pro	Clay	(Australia) Ken Rosewall	6–3, 2–6, 4–6, 0–6
Loss	1958	US Pro	Indoor	(United States) Pancho Gonzales	6–3, 6–4, 12–14, 1–6, 4–6
Loss	1959	US Pro	Indoor	(United States) Pancho Gonzales	4–6, 2–6, 4–6
Loss	1960	French Pro	Clay	(Australia) Ken Rosewall	2–6, 6–2, 2–6, 1–6
Loss	1961	Wembley Pro	Indoor	(Australia) Ken Rosewall	3–6, 6–3, 2–6, 3–6
Loss	1962	Wembley Pro	Indoor	(Australia) Ken Rosewall	4–6, 7–5, 13–15, 5–7
Loss	1963	Wembley Pro	Indoor	(Australia) Ken Rosewall	4–6, 2–6, 6–4, 3–6

=== Doubles: 13 (8 titles, 5 runner-ups) ===
Result	Year	Championship	Surface	Partner	Opponents	Score
Win	1953	Australian Championships	Grass	(Australia) Ken Rosewall	(Australia) Don Candy (Australia) Mervyn Rose	9–11, 6–4, 10–8, 6–4
Win	1953	French Championships	Clay	(Australia) Ken Rosewall	(Australia) Mervyn Rose (Australia) Clive Wilderspin	6–2, 6–1, 6–1
Win	1953	Wimbledon	Grass	(Australia) Ken Rosewall	(Australia) Rex Hartwig (Australia) Mervyn Rose	6–4, 7–5, 4–6, 7–5
Loss	1954	French Championships	Clay	(Australia) Ken Rosewall	(United States) Vic Seixas (United States) Tony Trabert	4–6, 2–6, 1–6
Loss	1954	U.S. National Championships	Grass	(Australia) Ken Rosewall	(United States) Vic Seixas (United States) Tony Trabert	6–3, 4–6, 6–8, 3–6
Loss	1955	Australian Championships	Grass	(Australia) Ken Rosewall	(United States) Vic Seixas (United States) Tony Trabert	3–6, 2–6, 6–2, 6–3, 1–6
Win	1955	Wimbledon	Grass	(Australia) Rex Hartwig	(Australia) Neale Fraser (Australia) Ken Rosewall	7–5, 6–4, 6–3
Win	1956	Australian Championships	Grass	(Australia) Ken Rosewall	(Australia) Don Candy (Australia) Mervyn Rose	10–8, 13–11, 6–4
Loss	1956	French Championships	Clay	(Australia) Ashley Cooper	(Australia) Don Candy (United States) Bob Perry	5–7, 3–6, 3–6
Win	1956	Wimbledon	Grass	(Australia) Ken Rosewall	(Italy) Orlando Sirola (Italy) Nicola Pietrangeli	7–5, 6–2, 6–1
Win	1956	U.S. National Championships	Grass	(Australia) Ken Rosewall	(United States) Hamilton Richardson (United States) Vic Seixas	6–2, 6–2, 3–6, 6–4
Win	1957	Australian Championships	Grass	(Australia) Neale Fraser	(Australia) Mal Anderson (Australia) Ashley Cooper	6–3, 8–6, 6–4
Loss	1957	Wimbledon	Grass	(Australia) Neale Fraser	(United States) Budge Patty (United States) Gardnar Mulloy	10–8, 4–6, 4–6, 4–6

=== Mixed doubles: 4 (1 title, 3 runner-ups) ===
Result	Year	Championship	Surface	Partner	Opponents	Score
Loss	1952	U.S. National Championships	Grass	(Australia) Thelma Coyne Long	(United States) Doris Hart (Australia) Frank Sedgman	3–6, 5–7
Win	1954	French Championships	Clay	(United States) Maureen Connolly	(France) Jacqueline Patorni (Australia) Rex Hartwig	6–4, 6–3
Loss	1955	Australian Championships	Grass	(Australia) Jenny Staley	(Australia) Thelma Coyne Long (United States) George Worthington	2–6, 1–6
Loss	1956	U.S. National Championships	Grass	(Australia) Darlene Hard	(United States) Margaret Osborne (Australia) Ken Rosewall	7–9, 1–6

== See also ==
- Overall tennis records – Men's singles
