= Warren Woodcock =

Australian tennis player

- Full name: Warren W. Woodcock
- Country (sports): Australia
- Born: 22 September 1936
- Died: 5 February 2022 (aged 85)

Singles

Grand Slam singles results
- Australian Open: QF (1957)
- French Open: 4R (1957)
- Wimbledon: 2R (1957, 1958, 1960, 1961)
- US Open: 1R (1960)

Doubles

Grand Slam doubles results
- Australian Open: SF (1957)
- Wimbledon: 3R (1957)

Mixed doubles

Grand Slam mixed doubles results
- Australian Open: 2R (1957)
- Wimbledon: 3R (1959)

Warren W. Woodcock (22 September 1936 – 5 February 2022) was an Australian amateur tennis player who competed in the 1950s and 1960s. He reached the quarterfinals of the Australian Championships in 1957 and the final of a US Pro Championship in 1967, losing to Sam Giammalva.

After retiring from tennis he became an on-course bookmaker.
