= 1957 Australian Championships =

- Date: 18-28 January 1957
- Edition: 45th
- Category: Grand Slam (ITF)
- Surface: Grass
- Location: Melbourne, Australia
- Venue: Kooyong Lawn Tennis Club

Champions

Men's singles
- (Australia) Ashley Cooper

Women's singles
- (United States) Shirley Fry

Men's doubles
- (Australia) Lew Hoad / (Australia) Neale Fraser

Women's doubles
- (United States) Althea Gibson / (United States) Shirley Fry Irvin

Mixed doubles
- (Australia) Fay Muller / (Australia) Mal Anderson
- Australian Championships

The 1957 Australian Championships was a tennis tournament that took place on outdoor Grass courts at the Kooyong Lawn Tennis Club, Melbourne, Australia from 17 January to 27 January. It was the 45th edition of the Australian Championships (now known as the Australian Open), the 13th held in Melbourne, and the first Grand Slam tournament of the year. The singles titles were taken by Ashley Cooper and Shirley Fry.

== Champions ==
=== Men's singles ===
(Australia) Ashley Cooper defeated (Australia) Neale Fraser 6–3, 9–11, 6–4, 6–2

=== Women's singles ===
(United States) Shirley Fry defeated (United States) Althea Gibson 6–3, 6–4

=== Men's doubles ===
(Australia) Neale Fraser / (Australia) Lew Hoad defeated (Australia) Mal Anderson / (Australia) Ashley Cooper 6–3, 8–6, 6–4

=== Women's doubles ===
(United States) Shirley Fry / (United States) Althea Gibson defeated (Australia) Mary Bevis Hawton / (Australia) Fay Muller 6–2, 6–1

=== Mixed doubles ===
(Australia) Fay Muller / (Australia) Mal Anderson defeated (Australia) Jill Langley / (United Kingdom) Billy Knight 7–5, 3–6, 6–1

Preceded by 1956 U.S. National Championships	Grand Slams	Succeeded by 1957 French Championships
