= 1957 Australian Championships – Women's singles =

Women's singles
- 1957 Australian Championships

Final
- Champion: (United States) Shirley Fry
- Runner-up: (United States) Althea Gibson
- Score: 6–3, 6–4

Details
- Draw: 32
- Seeds: 8

Events
Singles	men	women
Doubles	men	women
- Australian Championships

First-seeded Shirley Fry defeated Althea Gibson 6–3, 6–4 in the final to win the women's singles tennis title at the 1957 Australian Championships and completed the career Grand Slam in singles.

== Seeds ==
The seeded players are listed below. Shirley Fry is the champion; others show the round in which they were eliminated.

1. (United States) Shirley Fry (champion)
2. (United States) Althea Gibson (finalist)
3. (Australia) Mary Carter (quarterfinals)
4. (Australia) Beryl Penrose (semifinals)
5. (Australia) Lorraine Coghlan (semifinals)
6. (Australia) Jenny Hoad (quarterfinals)
7. (Australia) Margaret Hellyer (second round)
8. (Australia) Fay Muller (second round)

== Draw ==
=== Key ===
- Q = Qualifier
- WC = Wild card
- LL = Lucky loser
- r = Retired

=== Finals ===
Quarterfinals
1	(United States) Shirley Fry	6	9
(Australia) Mary Hawton	1	7
4	(Australia) Beryl Penrose	7	6
6	(Australia) Jenny Hoad	5	2
5	(Australia) Lorraine Coghlan	8	6	6
3	(Australia) Mary Carter	10	4	1
(Australia) Loris Southam	1	3
2	(United States) Althea Gibson	6	6

Semifinals
1	(United States) Shirley Fry	6	6
4	(Australia) Beryl Penrose	3	4
5	(Australia) Lorraine Coghlan	5	3
2	(United States) Althea Gibson	7	6

Finals
1	(United States) Shirley Fry	6	6
2	(United States) Althea Gibson	3	4

=== Earlier rounds ===
==== Section 1 ====
First round
1	(United States) Fry	6	6
(Australia) Orton	1	2
(Australia) Donoghue	6	6
(Australia) Stewart	4	1
8	(Australia) Muller	6	7
(Australia) Carter	4	5
(Australia) Hawton	6	3
(Australia) Thiele	3	0	r
4	(Australia) Penrose	6	6
(Australia) Gibson	1	2
(Australia) Rae	6	6
(Australia) Strachan	1	1
6	(Australia) Hoad	6	3	6
(Australia) Rayson	3	6	2
(Australia) Jones	6	6
(Australia) Bowden	3	1

Second round
1	(United States) Fry	6	6
(Australia) Donoghue	1	1
8	(Australia) Muller	6	4	1
(Australia) Hawton	2	6	6
4	(Australia) Penrose	6	6	6
(Australia) Rae	8	3	1
6	(Australia) Hoad	6	5	6
(Australia) Jones	1	7	3

Quarterfinals
1	(United States) Fry	6	9
(Australia) Hawton	1	7
4	(Australia) Penrose	7	6
6	(Australia) Hoad	5	2

Semifinals
1	(United States) Fry	6	6
4	(Australia) Penrose	3	4

==== Section 2 ====
First round
(Australia) Hopman	6	10	6
(Australia) Parmenter	4	12	4
5	(Australia) Coghlan	6	6
(Australia) Shearer	4	1
(Australia) Duldig	8	6	6
(Australia) Langley	10	0	1
3	(Australia) Carter	6	7
(Australia) Harrison	4	5
(Australia) Southam	6	6
(Australia) Duncan	2	1
7	(Australia) Hellyer	7	6
(Australia) Blackburn	5	4
(Australia) McCalman	6	6
(Australia) Turner	0	3
2	(United States) Gibson	6	6
(Australia) Tegart	4	0

Second round
(Australia) Hopman	3	3
5	(Australia) Coghlan	6	6
(Australia) Duldig	3	2
3	(Australia) Carter	6	6
(Australia) Southam	6	9
7	(Australia) Hellyer	2	7
(Australia) McCalman	4	1
2	(United States) Gibson	6	6

Quarterfinals
5	(Australia) Coghlan	8	6	6
3	(Australia) Carter	10	4	1
(Australia) Southam	1	3
2	(United States) Gibson	6	6

Semifinals
5	(Australia) Coghlan	5	3
2	(United States) Gibson	7	6

Preceded by 1956 U.S. National Championships – Women's singles	Grand Slam women's singles	Succeeded by 1957 French Championships – Women's singles
