= 1955 Australian Championships =

Tennis tournament

- Date: 21– 31 January 1955
- Edition: 43rd
- Category: Grand Slam (ITF)
- Surface: Grass
- Location: Adelaide, Australia
- Venue: Memorial Drive

Champions

Men's singles
- (Australia) Ken Rosewall

Women's singles
- (Australia) Beryl Penrose

Men's doubles
- (United States) Vic Seixas / (United States) Tony Trabert

Women's doubles
- (Australia) Mary Bevis Hawton / (Australia) Beryl Penrose

Mixed doubles
- (Australia) Thelma Coyne Long / (Australia) George Worthington
- Australian Championships

The 1955 Australian Championships was a tennis tournament that took place on outdoor Grass courts at the Memorial Drive, Adelaide, Australia from 21 January to 31 January.

It was the 43rd edition of the Australian Championships (now known as the Australian Open), the 11th held in Adelaide, and the first Grand Slam tournament of the year. The singles titles were won by Australians Ken Rosewall and Beryl Penrose.

== Champions ==
=== Men's singles ===
(Australia) Ken Rosewall defeated (Australia) Lew Hoad 9–7, 6–4, 6–4

=== Women's singles ===
(Australia) Beryl Penrose defeated (Australia) Thelma Coyne Long 6–4, 6–3

=== Men's doubles ===
(United States) Vic Seixas / (United States) Tony Trabert defeated (Australia) Lew Hoad / (Australia) Ken Rosewall 6–3, 6–2, 2–6, 3–6, 6–1

=== Women's doubles ===
(Australia) Mary Bevis Hawton / (Australia) Beryl Penrose defeated (Australia) Nell Hall Hopman / (Australia) Gwen Thiele 7–5, 6–1

=== Mixed doubles ===
(Australia) Thelma Coyne Long / (Australia) George Worthington defeated (Australia) Jenny Staley / (Australia) Lew Hoad 6–2, 6–1

Preceded by 1954 U.S. National Championships	Grand Slams	Succeeded by 1955 French Championships
