= 1956 U.S. National Championships (tennis) =

1956 US Tennis Championships

- Date: 31 August – 9 September
- Edition: 76th
- Category: Grand Slam (ILTF)
- Surface: Grass
- Location: Chestnut Hill, Massachusetts; Forest Hills, Queens, New York City; United States
- Venue: Longwood Cricket Club; West Side Tennis Club

Champions

Men's singles
- (Australia) Ken Rosewall

Women's singles
- (United States) Shirley Fry

Men's doubles
- (Australia) Lew Hoad / (Australia) Ken Rosewall

Women's doubles
- (United States) Louise Brough / (United States) Margaret Osborne duPont

Mixed doubles
- (United States) Margaret Osborne duPont / (Australia) Ken Rosewall
- U.S. National Championships

The 1956 U.S. National Championships (now known as the US Open) was a tennis tournament that took place on the outdoor grass courts at the West Side Tennis Club, Forest Hills in New York City, New York. The tournament ran from 31 August until 9 September. It was the 76th staging of the U.S. National Championships, and the fourth Grand Slam tennis event of the year.

== Finals ==
=== Men's singles ===
(Australia) Ken Rosewall (AUS) defeated (Australia) Lew Hoad (AUS) 4–6, 6–2, 6–3, 6–3

=== Women's singles ===
(United States) Shirley Fry (USA) defeated (United States) Althea Gibson (USA) 6–3, 6–4

=== Men's doubles ===
(Australia) Lew Hoad (AUS) / (Australia) Ken Rosewall (AUS) defeated (United States) Ham Richardson (USA) / (United States) Vic Seixas (USA) 6–2, 6–2, 3–6, 6–4

=== Women's doubles ===
(United States) Louise Brough (USA) / (United States) Margaret Osborne (USA) defeated (United States) Shirley Fry (USA) / (United States) Betty Pratt (USA) 6–3, 6–0

=== Mixed doubles ===
(United States) Margaret Osborne (USA) / (Australia) Ken Rosewall (AUS) defeated (United States) Darlene Hard (USA) / (Australia) Lew Hoad (AUS) 9–7, 6–1

Preceded by 1956 Wimbledon Championships	Grand Slams	Succeeded by 1957 Australian Championships
