= Richard Evans (journalist) =

British sports journalist, author

Richard Robert Ingham Evans (born February 10, 1939, in Paris, France) is a British sports journalist, author, and historian who is most closely associated with tennis.

As a teenager he was educated at Canford School, a boarding school in Dorset. His journalistic career in tennis began at Wimbledon in 1960. He has written 23 books, including biographies of Ilie Nastase and John McEnroe, as well as serving the Association of Tennis Professionals (ATP) in several roles; as its first press officer in 1973, as European Director from 1974 to 1977, and on its Board of Directors from 1977 to 1979. In 1986 he was the third recipient of the ATP's Ron Bookman Media Excellence Award. In 2000 he was one of the founders of the International Tennis Writers' Association (ITWA), and served as its president from 2001 to 2004.

In 2024 he was elected to the International Tennis Hall of Fame for his contributions to the game.

Prior to his induction, when asked who he viewed as the greatest ever player he unequivocally cited Roger Federer. "Federer is the best player I’ve ever seen. Aesthetically and technically, Roger is in a class of his own." Before that he cited Lew Hoad, who was Evans' immediate neighbour in Spain for several years in the '80s and '90s. He claimed "until Roger Federer came along, I thought Lew Hoad was the greatest tennis player in the world”, "the player his rivals agreed would be the one you picked to play for your life, provided he hadn’t had too many beers", and was "without question the strongest man who ever played the game".
