= 1954 U.S. National Championships – Women's singles =

Women's singles
- 1954 U.S. National Championships

Final
- Champion: (United States) Doris Hart
- Runner-up: (United States) Louise Brough
- Score: 6–8, 6–1, 8–6

Details
- Seeds: 8

Events
Singles	men	women
Doubles	men	women
- U.S. National Championships

Second-seeded Doris Hart defeated Louise Brough 6–8, 6–1, 8–6 in the final to win the women's singles tennis title at the 1954 U.S. National Championships and completed the career grand slam in singles. She also completed the first 'Boxed Set' in tennis history. Maureen Connolly was the three-time defending champion, but was unable to defend her title after a horse riding accident.

== Seeds ==
The eight seeded players are listed below. Doris Hart is the champion; others show in brackets the round in which they were eliminated.

1. (United States) Louise Brough (finalist)
2. (United States) Doris Hart (champion)
3. (United States) Beverly Baker Fleitz (quarterfinals)
4. (United States) Margaret Osborne duPont (third round)
5. (United States) Shirley Fry (semifinals)
6. (United States) Betty Pratt (quarterfinals)
7. (Mexico) Helen Perez (second round)
8. (United States) Lois Felix (quarterfinals)

== Draw ==
=== Key ===
- Q = Qualifier
- WC = Wild card
- LL = Lucky loser
- r = Retired

=== Final eight ===
Quarterfinals
1	(United States) Louise Brough	6	6
(United States) Betty Pratt	2	3
(United States) Dennis Bradshaw	3	7	2
(United States) Darlene Hard	6	5	6
2	(United States) Doris Hart	6	6
8	(United States) Lois Felix	1	1
3	(United States) Beverly Baker Fleitz
5	(United States) Shirley Fry	w/o

Semifinals
1	(United States) Louise Brough	6	6
(United States) Darlene Hard	3	3
2	(United States) Doris Hart	6	6
5	(United States) Shirley Fry	2	0

Finals
1	(United States) Louise Brough	8	1	6
2	(United States) Doris Hart	6	6	8

Preceded by 1954 Wimbledon Championships – Women's singles	Grand Slam women's singles	Succeeded by 1955 Australian Championships – Women's singles
