= 1956 U.S. National Championships – Women's singles =

Women's singles
- 1956 U.S. National Championships

Final
- Champion: (United States) Shirley Fry
- Runner-up: (United States) Althea Gibson
- Score: 6–3, 6–4

Details
- Seeds: 8

Events
| Singles | men | women | | boys | girls |
| Doubles | men | women | mixed | boys | girls |
- U.S. National Championships

First-seeded Shirley Fry defeated Althea Gibson 6–3, 6–4 in the final to win the women's singles tennis title at the 1956 U.S. National Championships.

== Seeds ==
The seeded players are listed below. Shirley Fry is the champion; others show in brackets the round in which they were eliminated.

1. (United States) Shirley Fry (champion)
2. (United States) Althea Gibson (finalist)
3. (United States) Louise Brough (quarterfinals)
4. (United States) Dorothy Knode (quarterfinals)
5. (United States) Margaret duPont (quarterfinals)
6. (United Kingdom) Shirley Bloomer (semifinals)
7. (United States) Betty Pratt (semifinals)
8. (United States) Darlene Hard (quarterfinals)

== Draw ==
=== Key ===
- Q = Qualifier
- WC = Wild card
- LL = Lucky loser
- r = Retired

=== Final eight ===
Quarterfinals
1 | (United States) Shirley Fry | 6 | 4 | 6
5 | (United States) Margaret duPont | 2 | 6 | 3
6 | (United Kingdom) Shirley Bloomer | 6 | 6
3 | (United States) Louise Brough | 3 | 3
4 | (United States) Dorothy Knode | 6 | 0 | 2
7 | (United States) Betty Pratt | 4 | 6 | 6
8 | (United States) Darlene Hard | 7 | 1
2 | (United States) Althea Gibson | 9 | 6

Semifinals
1 | (United States) Shirley Fry | 6 | 6
6 | (United Kingdom) Shirley Bloomer | 4 | 4
8 | (United States) Betty Pratt | 1 | 8
2 | (United States) Althea Gibson | 6 | 10

Finals
1 | (United States) Shirley Fry | 6 | 6
2 | (United States) Althea Gibson | 3 | 4

| Preceded by 1956 Wimbledon Championships – Women's singles | Grand Slam women's singles | Succeeded by 1957 Australian Championships – Women's singles |
