= 1957 French Championships – Men's singles =

Men's singles
- 1957 French Championships

Final
- Champion: (Sweden) Sven Davidson
- Runner-up: (United States) Herbert Flam
- Score: 6–3, 6–4, 6–4

Details
- Draw: 79
- Seeds: 16

Events
Singles	men	women
Doubles	men	women
- French Championships

Third-seeded Sven Davidson defeated Herbert Flam 6–3, 6–4, 6–4 in the final to win the men's singles tennis title at the 1957 French Championships.

== Seeds ==
The seeded players are listed below. Sven Davidson was the champion; others show the round in which they were eliminated.

1. (Australia) Lew Hoad (third round)
2. (Australia) Ashley Cooper (semifinals)
3. (Sweden) Sven Davidson (champion)
4. (Italy) Giuseppe Merlo (fourth round)
5. (Australia) Mervyn Rose (semifinals)
6. (Italy) Nicola Pietrangeli (first round)
7. (United States) Budge Patty (fourth round)
8. (United States) Herbert Flam (final)
9. (France) Pierre Darmon (second round)
10. (Australia) Neale Fraser (quarterfinals)
11. (Belgium) Jacques Brichant (quarterfinals)
12. (Egypt) Jaroslav Drobný (second round)
13. (France) Robert Haillet (quarterfinals)
14. (France) Paul Rémy (fourth round)
15. (United Kingdom) Mike Davies (third round)
16. (Chile) Luis Ayala (third round)

== Draw ==
=== Key ===
- Q = Qualifier
- WC = Wild card
- LL = Lucky loser
- r = Retired

=== Finals ===
Quarterfinals
(Belgium) Philippe Washer	7	4	3	6	4
8	(United States) Herbert Flam	5	6	6	4	6
13	(France) Robert Haillet
5	(Australia) Mervyn Rose
11	(Belgium) Jacques Brichant	2	2	6	2
3	(Sweden) Sven Davidson	6	6	4	6
10	(Australia) Neale Fraser	6	6	5	6	3
2	(Australia) Ashley Cooper	0	8	7	4	6

Semifinals
8	(United States) Herbert Flam	4	6	4	6	7
5	(Australia) Mervyn Rose	6	4	6	2	5
3	(Sweden) Sven Davidson	6	2	2	6	6
2	(Australia) Ashley Cooper	4	6	6	2	3

Final
8	(United States) Herbert Flam	3	4	4
3	(Sweden) Sven Davidson	6	6	6

=== Earlier rounds ===
==== Section 1 ====
First round

Second round
1	(Australia) Hoad	w	o
(Hungary) Katona
(Australia) Gibson	3	6	7	3	6
(Mexico) Llamas	6	3	5	6	1
15	(United Kingdom) Davies	6	6	6
(Italy) Maggi	1	2	2
(United States) Stewart	1	4	0
(Belgium) Washer	6	6	6

Third round
1	(Australia) Hoad	6	6	4	4	4
(Australia) Gibson	2	3	6	6	6
15	(United Kingdom) Davies	4	3	1
(Belgium) Washer	6	6	6

Fourth round
(Australia) Gibson	2	3	5
(Belgium) Washer	6	6	7

==== Section 2 ====
First round

Second round
8	(United States) Flam	6	3	4	6	6
(Canada) Bedard	3	6	6	1	1
(United Kingdom) Knight	4	2	3
(South Africa) Forbes	6	6	6
9	(France) Darmon	0	3	6	7	3
(Italy) Jacobini	6	6	2	5	6
(France) Pilet	4	6	7	6
(Mexico) Reyes Jr	6	4	5	0

Third round
8	(United States) Flam	6	6	6
(South Africa) Forbes	1	4	3
(Italy) Jacobini	6	6	6
(France) Pilet	3	3	4

Fourth round
8	(United States) Flam	6	6	6
(Italy) Jacobini	1	1	2

==== Section 3 ====
First round

Second round
4	(Italy) Merlo	6	6	2	6
(United States) Schwartz	4	4	6	3
(Germany) Huber	3	4	3
(South Africa) Segal	6	6	6
13	(France) Haillet	6	6	4	6
(United States) Moss	1	3	6	2
(New Zealand) Robson	5	1	2
(Denmark) Ulrich	7	6	6

Third round
4	(Italy) Merlo	8	6	6
(South Africa) Segal	6	2	3
13	(France) Haillet	6	5	6	6
(Denmark) Ulrich	3	7	3	1

Fourth round
4	(Italy) Merlo	7	6	6	6	4
13	(France) Haillet	9	8	4	1	6

==== Section 4 ====
First round
(Colombia) Álvarez	6	1	6	6
(Poland) Radzio	4	6	3	3
(India) Krishnan	6	7	6
(France) Jalabert	2	5	2
(South Africa) Koenig	6	5	7	6
(New Zealand) Parker	1	7	5	3
12	(Egypt) Drobný	9	3	6	6
(France) Perreau-Saussine	7	6	1	1
(Denmark) Nielsen	6	6	9
(United Kingdom) Barrett	3	2	7
(Australia) Howe	11	6	7
(Sweden) Schmidt	9	3	5
(United States) Shea
(Italy) Fachini

Second round
5	(Australia) Rose	6	6	6
(Colombia) Álvarez	3	0	1
(India) Krishnan	6	6	6
(South Africa) Koenig	1	1	1
12	(Egypt) Drobný	0	6	7	7	6
(Denmark) Nielsen	6	2	5	9	8
(Australia) Howe	6	6	7
(United States) Shea	2	2	5

Third round
5	(Australia) Rose	6	6	6
(India) Krishnan	4	3	4
(Denmark) Nielsen	6	8	6
(Australia) Howe	4	6	4

Fourth round
5	(Australia) Rose	7	0	6	7	6
(Denmark) Nielsen	5	6	3	9	3

==== Section 5 ====
First round
(Spain) Martínez	5	1	3
(Australia) Emerson	7	6	6
(Australia) Mark	13	6	6	8	10
(Hungary) Jancsó	15	3	8	6	8
(Italy) Bergamo	3	6	6	6
(New Zealand) Gerrard	6	4	2	3
(Germany) Scholl	5	6	3	5
11	(Belgium) Brichant	7	3	6	7
(Czechoslovakia) Merunka	2	0	2
(India) Kumar	6	6	6
(France) Pellizza	4	3	0	r
(Spain) Gimeno	6	6	1
(France) Grinda	13	0	2	6	0
(Australia) Woodcock	11	6	6	4	6
(Australia) Anderson	6	6	3	6
6	(Italy) Pietrangeli	4	2	6	4

Second round
(Australia) Emerson	3	6	6	6
(Australia) Mark	6	3	3	4
(Italy) Bergamo	2	3	4
11	(Belgium) Brichant	6	6	6
(India) Kumar	0	1	6	10
(Spain) Gimeno	6	6	4	12
(Australia) Woodcock	5	1	6	6	6
(Australia) Anderson	7	6	4	4	3

Third round
(Australia) Emerson	4	1	4
11	(Belgium) Brichant	6	6	6
(Spain) Gimeno	3	6	6	2	6
(Australia) Woodcock	6	4	4	6	8

Fourth round
11	(Belgium) Brichant	4	5	6	10	6
(Australia) Woodcock	6	7	3	8	3

==== Section 6 ====
First round

Second round
(Hungary) Ádám-Stolpa
(Chile) Hammersley
(Mexico) Palafox	2	6	1	2
14	(France) Rémy	6	4	6	6
(United Kingdom) Wilson
(Hungary) Asbóth
(Czechoslovakia) Javorský	1	7	1	2
3	(Sweden) Davidson	6	5	6	6

Third round
(Chile) Hammersley	2	4	5
14	(France) Rémy	6	6	7
(United Kingdom) Wilson	5	6	2	5
3	(Sweden) Davidson	7	4	6	7

Fourth round
14	(France) Rémy	3	4	5
3	(Sweden) Davidson	6	6	7

==== Section 7 ====
First round

Second round
(Denmark) Ulrich
(Hungary) Gulyás
(France) Abdesselam	2	1	3
10	(Australia) Fraser	6	6	6
(Australia) Candy	6	6	3	6
(France) Molinari	3	3	6	4
(France) Nys	5	0	6	1
7	(United States) Patty	7	6	1	6

Third round
(Denmark) Ulrich	5	4	0
10	(Australia) Fraser	7	6	6
(Australia) Candy	8	10	5	3	3
7	(United States) Patty	6	8	7	6	6

Fourth round
10	(Australia) Fraser	9	3	5	6	6
7	(United States) Patty	7	6	7	4	1

==== Section 8 ====
First round

Second round
(South Africa) Fancutt	6	7	4
(Mexico) Contreras	8	9	6
(Czechoslovakia) Krajcik	2	2	4
16	(Chile) Ayala	6	6	6
(Poland) Skonecki	6	5	5	8	3
(Italy) Sirola	3	7	7	6	6
(Poland) Licis	1	6	0	1
2	(Australia) Cooper	6	3	6	6

Third round
(Mexico) Contreras	6	7	3	6
16	(Chile) Ayala	3	5	6	2
(Italy) Sirola	6	4	0	6	7
2	(Australia) Cooper	4	6	6	4	9

Fourth round
(Mexico) Contreras	3	1	2
2	(Australia) Cooper	6	6	6

Preceded by 1957 Australian Championships – Men's singles	Grand Slam men's singles	Succeeded by 1957 Wimbledon Championships – Men's singles
