= 1957 Australian Championships – Men's singles =

Men's singles
- 1957 Australian Championships

Final
- Champion: (Australia) Ashley Cooper
- Runner-up: (Australia) Neale Fraser
- Score: 6–3, 9–11, 6–4, 6–2

Details
- Draw: 32
- Seeds: 8

Events
Singles	men	women
Doubles	men	women
- Australian Championships

Second-seeded Ashley Cooper defeated Neale Fraser 6–3, 9–11, 6–4, 6–2 in the final to win the men's singles tennis title at the 1957 Australian Championships.

== Seeds ==
The seeded players are listed below. Ashley Cooper is the champion; others show the round in which they were eliminated. It was a difficult championship for everyone involved, widely regarded as one of the championships in all Australian history.

1. (Australia) Lew Hoad (semifinals)
2. (Australia) Ashley Cooper (champion)
3. (Australia) Neale Fraser (finalist)
4. (Australia) Mal Anderson (semifinals)
5. (Italy) Nicola Pietrangeli (quarterfinals)
6. (United Kingdom) Mike Davies (second round)
7. (Australia) Warren Woodcock (quarterfinals)
8. (Australia) Bob Howe (second round)

== Draw ==
=== Key ===
- Q = Qualifier
- WC = Wild card
- LL = Lucky loser
- r = Retired

=== Finals ===
Quarterfinals
1	(Australia) Lew Hoad	4	3	6	6	6
(United States) Michael Green	6	6	2	3	3
3	(Australia) Neale Fraser	6	6	6
(Australia) Graham Lovett	0	1	0
5	(Italy) Nicola Pietrangeli	7	7	2
4	(Australia) Mal Anderson	9	9	6
7	(Australia) Warren Woodcock	2	6	1	4
2	(Australia) Ashley Cooper	6	3	6	6

Semifinals
1	(Australia) Lew Hoad	5	6	1	4
3	(Australia) Neale Fraser	7	3	6	6
4	(Australia) Mal Anderson	4	7	4
2	(Australia) Ashley Cooper	6	9	6

Final
3	(Australia) Neale Fraser	3	11	4	2
2	(Australia) Ashley Cooper	6	9	6	6

=== Earlier rounds ===
==== Section 1 ====
First round
1	(Australia) Hoad	7	6	6
(Australia) Hearnden	5	1	4
(Australia) Gibson	6	6	6
(Italy) Maggi	3	3	1
8	(Australia) Howe	6	6	7
(Australia) Laver	0	3	5
(United States) Green	8	6	6
(New Zealand) Gerrard	6	2	2
3	(Australia) Fraser	6	6	6
(Australia) Stewart	3	4	3
(Australia) Tobin	7	6	3	6
(Australia) Newman	5	0	6	2
6	(United Kingdom) Davies	3	6	6	6
(Australia) Pearce	6	3	2	2
(Australia) Lovett	6	2	6	7
(Australia) Shepherd	4	6	2	5

Second round
1	(Australia) Hoad	6	6	6
(Australia) Gibson	3	4	0
8	(Australia) Howe	4	2	4
(United States) Green	6	6	6
3	(Australia) Fraser	7	6	6	6
(Australia) Tobin	9	1	0	2
6	(United Kingdom) Davies	6	6	4	4
(Australia) Lovett	1	8	6	6

Quarterfinals
1	(Australia) Hoad	4	3	6	6	6
(United States) Green	6	6	2	3	3
3	(Australia) Fraser	6	6	6
(Australia) Lovett	0	1	0

Semifinals
1	(Australia) Hoad	5	6	1	4
3	(Australia) Fraser	7	3	6	6

==== Section 2 ====
First round
(Australia) Mark	4	6	6	6
(Australia) Bowman	6	4	2	3
5	(Italy) Pietrangeli	4	6	6	8
(Australia) Napier	6	3	4	6
(United States) Franks
(Australia) Gulley	w/o
4	(Australia) Anderson	6	10	6
(Australia) O'Kane	1	8	1
(United Kingdom) Knight	6	6	6
(Australia) Jacques	0	3	2
7	(Australia) Woodcock	6	7	1	6
(Australia) Yates	2	5	6	2
(Australia) Phillips-Moore	6	5	6	6
(Australia) Hallam	2	7	0	1
2	(Australia) Cooper	6	6	6
(Australia) Kendall	0	0	3

Second round
(Australia) Mark	9	6	4	1
5	(Italy) Pietrangeli	11	3	6	6
(United States) Franks	3	2	0
4	(Australia) Anderson	6	6	6
(United Kingdom) Knight	6	2	4	2
7	(Australia) Woodcock	3	6	6	6
(Australia) Phillips-Moore	3	2	8
2	(Australia) Cooper	6	6	10

Quarterfinals
5	(Italy) Pietrangeli	7	7	2
4	(Australia) Anderson	9	9	6
7	(Australia) Woodcock	2	6	1	4
2	(Australia) Cooper	6	3	6	6

Semifinals
4	(Australia) Anderson	4	7	4
2	(Australia) Cooper	6	9	6

Preceded by 1956 U.S. National Championships	Grand Slam men's singles	Succeeded by 1957 French Championships
