= 1954 U.S. National Championships (tennis) =

- Date: 28 August – 6 September
- Edition: 74th
- Category: Grand Slam (ILTF)
- Surface: Grass
- Location: Chestnut Hill, Massachusetts; Forest Hills, Queens, New York City; United States
- Venue: Longwood Cricket Club; West Side Tennis Club

Champions

Men's singles
- (United States) Vic Seixas

Women's singles
- (United States) Doris Hart

Men's doubles
- (United States) Vic Seixas / (United States) Tony Trabert

Women's doubles
- (United States) Shirley Fry / (United States) Doris Hart

Mixed doubles
- (United States) Doris Hart / (United States) Vic Seixas
- U.S. National Championships

The 1954 U.S. National Championships (now known as the US Open) was a tennis tournament that took place on the outdoor grass courts at the West Side Tennis Club, Forest Hills in New York City, New York. The tournament ran from 28 August until 6 September. It was the 74th staging of the U.S. National Championships, and the fourth Grand Slam tennis event of the year.

== Finals ==
=== Men's singles ===
(United States) Vic Seixas defeated (Australia) Rex Hartwig 3–6, 6–2, 6–4, 6–4

=== Women's singles ===
(United States) Doris Hart defeated (United States) Louise Brough 6–8, 6–1, 8–6

=== Men's doubles ===
(United States) Vic Seixas / (United States) Tony Trabert defeated (Australia) Lew Hoad / (Australia) Ken Rosewall 3–6, 6–4, 8–6, 6–3

=== Women's doubles ===
(United States) Shirley Fry / (United States) Doris Hart defeated (United States) Louise Brough / (United States) Margaret Osborne duPont 6–4, 6–4

=== Mixed doubles ===
(United States) Doris Hart / (United States) Vic Seixas defeated (United States) Margaret Osborne duPont / (Australia) Ken Rosewall 4–6, 6–1, 6–1

| Preceded by 1954 Wimbledon Championships | Grand Slams | Succeeded by 1955 Australian Championships |
