= 1957 French Championships (tennis) =

- Date: 21 May – 1 June 1957
- Edition: 56
- Category: 27th Grand Slam (ITF)
- Surface: Clay
- Location: Paris (XVI^{e}), France
- Venue: Stade Roland Garros

Champions

Men's singles
- (Sweden) Sven Davidson

Women's singles
- (United Kingdom) Shirley Bloomer

Men's doubles
- (Australia) Malcolm Anderson / (Australia) Ashley Cooper

Women's doubles
- (United Kingdom) Shirley Bloomer / (United States) Darlene Hard

Mixed doubles
- (Czechoslovakia) Věra Pužejová / (Czechoslovakia) Jirí Javorský
- French Championships

The 1957 French Championships (now known as the French Open) was a tennis tournament that took place on the outdoor clay courts at the Stade Roland-Garros in Paris, France. The tournament ran from 21 May until 1 June. It was the 61st staging of the French Championships, and the second Grand Slam tennis event of 1957. Sven Davidson and Shirley Bloomer won the singles titles.

== Finals ==
=== Men's singles ===
(Sweden) Sven Davidson defeated (United States) Herbert Flam 6–3, 6–4, 6–4

=== Women's singles ===
(United Kingdom) Shirley Bloomer defeated (United States) Dorothy Head Knode 6–1, 6–3

=== Men's doubles ===
(Australia) Malcolm Anderson / (Australia) Ashley Cooper defeated (Australia) Don Candy / (Australia) Mervyn Rose 6–3, 6–0, 6–3

=== Women's doubles ===
(United Kingdom) Shirley Bloomer / (United States) Darlene Hard defeated (Mexico) Yola Ramírez / (Mexico) Rosie Reyes 7–5, 4–6, 7–5

=== Mixed doubles ===
(Czechoslovakia) Věra Pužejová / (Czechoslovakia) Jiří Javorský defeated (West Germany) Edda Buding / (Chile) Luis Ayala 6–3, 6–4

Preceded by 1957 Australian Championships	Grand Slams	Succeeded by 1957 Wimbledon Championships
