= Fay Muller =

Australian tennis player

- Full name: Esme Fay Muller
- Country (sports): Australia
- Born: 4 November 1933 (age 92) Laidley, Australia

Singles

Grand Slam singles results
- Australian Open: QF (1955, 1956, 1958, 1960)
- French Open: 2R (1955, 1956)
- Wimbledon: 4R (1956, 1958)

Doubles

Grand Slam doubles results
- Australian Open: F (1957)
- French Open: SF (1956, 1958, 1959)
- Wimbledon: F (1956)

Grand Slam mixed doubles results
- Australian Open: W (1957)
- French Open: SF (1959)
- Wimbledon: QF (1956)

Fay Muller (born 4 November 1933) is a former international tennis player from Australia. She competed in the Australian Championships nine times, from 1952 to 1963. At the 1956 Wimbledon Championships she partnered with Daphne Seeney to reach the final of the doubles event. In 1957 she won the mixed doubles title with Malcolm Anderson at the Australian Championships and reached the women's doubles final with Mary Bevis Hawton.

Muller married twice. Her first marriage to Arden Arthur Robinson took place on 27 February 1960 in Brisbane. Her second marriage was to Robert William Colthorpe on 27 February 1971, also in Brisbane. Muller was honored by the Brisbane City Council in May 2016 by having a tennis rebound wall named after her at the site of the old Milton Tennis Courts, now known as Frew Park.

== Grand Slam tournament finals ==
=== Doubles (2 runners-up) ===
Result	Year	Championship	Surface	Partner	Opponents	Score
Loss	1956	Wimbledon	Grass	(Australia) Daphne Seeney	(United Kingdom) Angela Buxton (United States) Althea Gibson	1–6, 6–8
Loss	1957	Australian Championships	Gras	(Australia) Mary Bevis Hawton	(United States) Shirley Fry (United States) Althea Gibson	2–6, 1–6

=== Mixed doubles (1 title) ===
Result	Year	Championship	Surface	Partner	Opponents	Score
Win	1957	Australian Championships	Grass	(Australia) Malcolm Anderson	(Australia) Jill Langley (United Kingdom) Billy Knight	7–5, 3–6, 6–1
