= 1958 Wimbledon Championships – Men's doubles =

Men's doubles
- 1958 Wimbledon Championships

Final
- Champions: (Sweden) Sven Davidson (Sweden) Ulf Schmidt
- Runners-up: (Australia) Ashley Cooper (Australia) Neale Fraser
- Score: 6–4, 6–4, 8–6

Details
- Draw: 64 (5Q)
- Seeds: 4

Events
Singles	men	women		boys	girls
Doubles	men	women	mixed	boys	girls
← 1957 ·	Wimbledon Championships	· 1959 →

Gardnar Mulloy and Budge Patty were the defending champions, but lost to Ramanathan Krishnan and Naresh Kumar in the third round.

Sven Davidson and Ulf Schmidt defeated Ashley Cooper and Neale Fraser in the final, 6–4, 6–4, 8–6 to win the gentlemen's doubles tennis title at the 1958 Wimbledon Championship.

== Seeds ==
1. (Australia) Ashley Cooper / (Australia) Neale Fraser (final)
2. (United States) Gardnar Mulloy / (United States) Budge Patty (third round)
3. (United States) Barry MacKay / (Australia) Mervyn Rose (semifinals)
4. (Australia) Bob Howe / (South Africa) Abe Segal (third round)

Click on the seed number of a player to go to their draw section.

== Draw ==
Key

- Q = Qualifier
- WC = Wild card
- LL = Lucky loser
- Alt = Alternate
- ITF = ITF entry
- PR = Protected ranking
- SR = Special ranking
- SE = Special exempt
- JE = Junior exempt
- JR = Junior Accelerator Programme entrant
- CO = College Accelerator Programme entrant
- NG = Next Gen Accelerator Program entrant
- w/o = Walkover
- r = Retired
- d = Defaulted

=== Finals ===
Quarterfinals
(India) Ramanathan Krishnan (India) Naresh Kumar	4	9	4	9
(Sweden) Sven Davidson (Sweden) Ulf Schmidt	6	7	6	11
(Italy) Nicola Pietrangeli (Italy) Orlando Sirola	4	8	6	7
(Mexico) Francisco Contreras (Mexico) Mario Llamas	6	6	3	5
(Socialist Federal Republic of Yugoslavia) Ilija Panajotović (Socialist Federal Republic of Yugoslavia) Ivko Plećević	3	7	3	2
3	(United States) Barry MacKay (Australia) Mervyn Rose	6	5	6	6
(France) Pierre Darmon (France) Paul Rémy	3	5	3
1	(Australia) Ashley Cooper (Australia) Neale Fraser	6	7	6

Semifinals
(Sweden) Sven Davidson (Sweden) Ulf Schmidt	8	3	6	7
(Italy) Nicola Pietrangeli (Italy) Orlando Sirola	6	6	3	5
3	(United States) Barry MacKay (Australia) Mervyn Rose	6	6	5	5
1	(Australia) Ashley Cooper (Australia) Neale Fraser	3	8	7	7

Final
(Sweden) Sven Davidson (Sweden) Ulf Schmidt	6	6	8
1	(Australia) Ashley Cooper (Australia) Neale Fraser	4	4	6

=== Top half ===
==== Section 1 ====
First round
2	(United States) Gardnar Mulloy (United States) Budge Patty	8	9	6
(West Germany) Wilhelm Bungert (West Germany) Peter Scholl	6	7	4
(France) Jean-Noël Grinda (France) Jean-Claude Molinari	9	6	6
(France) Bernard Destremau (France) Robert Haillet	7	3	4
(India) Ramanathan Krishnan (India) Naresh Kumar	6	6	6
(Netherlands) Willem Maris (Netherlands) Hans van de Weg	1	2	3
(Socialist Federal Republic of Yugoslavia) Kamilo Keretić (Socialist Federal Republic of Yugoslavia) Sima Nikolić	2	3	3
(United States) Bob Perry (Australia) Warren Woodcock	6	6	6
(Sweden) Sven Davidson (Sweden) Ulf Schmidt	6	6	7
(Australia) Warren Jacques (Australia) Peter Newman	4	4	5
(Australia) Paul Hearnden (Australia) Graeme Stewart	6	9	2	9
(United Kingdom) Basil Hutchins (United Kingdom) Geoffrey Owen	3	7	6	7
(Spain) Jaime Bartrolí (Spain) Emilio Martínez	6	1	5	6	4
(United Kingdom) Tony Clayton (United Kingdom) Geoff Ward	2	6	7	1	6
(Uruguay) Eduardo Argon (United States) Nick Carter
(Hungary) István Gulyás (Poland) Andrzej Licis	w/o

Second round
2	(United States) G Mulloy (United States) J Patty	6	6	6
(France) J-N Grinda (France) J-C Molinari	0	3	3
(India) R Krishnan (India) N Kumar	6	6	6
(United States) R Perry (Australia) W Woodcock	2	3	2
(Sweden) S Davidson (Sweden) U Schmidt	6	6	6
(Australia) P Hearnden (Australia) G Stewart	0	3	4
(United Kingdom) A Clayton (United Kingdom) G Ward	5	4	4
(Uruguay) E Argon (United States) C Carter	7	6	6

Third round
2	(United States) G Mulloy (United States) J Patty	6	4	2	6	5
(India) R Krishnan (India) N Kumar	3	6	6	3	7
(Sweden) S Davidson (Sweden) U Schmidt	6	6	6
(Uruguay) E Argon (United States) C Carter	2	3	4

Quarterfinals
(India) R Krishnan (India) N Kumar	4	9	4	9
(Sweden) S Davidson (Sweden) U Schmidt	6	7	6	11

==== Section 2 ====
First round
4	(Australia) Bob Howe (South Africa) Abe Segal	6	6	6
(Denmark) Kurt Nielsen (Denmark) Torben Ulrich	3	4	2
(Cuba) Orlando Garrido (Venezuela) Isaías Pimentel	8	2	8	1
(Sweden) Jan-Erik Lundqvist (Denmark) Jørgen Ulrich	10	6	6	6
(Italy) Nicola Pietrangeli (Italy) Orlando Sirola	6	3	10	6
(Australia) Rod Laver (Australia) Bob Mark	2	6	8	3
(United Kingdom) Mike Davies (United Kingdom) Bobby Wilson	w/o
(United States) John Cranston (United States) Mike Green
(United Kingdom) Dennis Hughes (United Kingdom) Gerry Oakley	6	9	2
(China) Chu Chen Hua (China) Mei Fu Chi	8	11	6
(Hungary) Antal Jancsó (Hungary) István Sikorszki	6	4	6	6
(Denmark) Søren Højberg (India) Narendra Nath	3	6	3	2
(United States) Malcolm Fox (United States) Jack Frost	6	6	13
(Chile) Ernesto Aguirre (Chile) Patricio Apey	3	4	11
(Mexico) Francisco Contreras (Mexico) Mario Llamas	7	6	6	4	6
(Belgium) Jacques Brichant (Belgium) Philippe Washer	5	3	8	6	4

Second round
4	(Australia) R Howe (South Africa) A Segal	13	6	6
(Sweden) J-E Lundqvist (Denmark) J Ulrich	11	4	4
(Italy) N Pietrangeli (Italy) O Sirola	6	3	6	10
(United States) J Cranston (United States) M Green	4	6	1	8
(China) CH Chu (China) FC Mei	7	6	8
(Hungary) A Jancsó (Hungary) I Sikorszki	9	8	10
(United States) M Fox (United States) J Frost	9	3	6	8	6
(Mexico) F Contreras (Mexico) M Llamas	11	6	1	6	8

Third round
4	(Australia) R Howe (South Africa) A Segal	6	6	9	3	4
(Italy) N Pietrangeli (Italy) O Sirola	4	8	7	6	6
(Hungary) A Jancsó (Hungary) I Sikorszki	4	6	12	3	3
(Mexico) F Contreras (Mexico) M Llamas	6	3	10	6	6

Quarterfinals
(Italy) N Pietrangeli (Italy) O Sirola	4	8	6	7
(Mexico) F Contreras (Mexico) M Llamas	6	6	3	5

=== Bottom half ===
==== Section 3 ====
First round
(Australia) Mal Anderson (United Kingdom) Roger Becker	9	6	6
(United Kingdom) Reg Bennett (United Kingdom) Alan Mills	7	4	4
(Mexico) Rafael Osuna (Mexico) Antonio Palafox	6	6	6
Q	(Chile) Daniel Achondo (Chile) Patricio Rodríguez	2	4	3
(Socialist Federal Republic of Yugoslavia) Ilija Panajotović (Socialist Federal Republic of Yugoslavia) Ivko Plećević	6	6	6
(Australia) Tim Cawthorn (United Kingdom) Howard Walton	3	2	4
(Austria) Franz Hainka (Austria) Franz Saiko	6	6	6
(United Kingdom) Peter Moys (United Kingdom) John Ward	2	3	2
(Brazil) Ronnie Barnes (Brazil) Carlos Fernandes	12	6	6
(Colombia) William Álvarez (Netherlands) Pieter van Eijsden	10	4	2
Q	(United States) Tom Frieberg (United States) Dale Junta	6	6	6
(Brazil) Ivo Ribeiro (India) Arcot Udaykumar	3	2	4
(Republic of Ireland) Joe Hackett (Republic of Ireland) Peter Jackson	2	4	2
(United Kingdom) Billy Knight (United Kingdom) Tony Pickard	6	6	6
(New Zealand) Lew Gerrard (New Zealand) Peter Nicholls	6	4	0
3	(United States) Barry MacKay (Australia) Mervyn Rose	8	6	6

Second round
(Australia) M Anderson (United Kingdom) R Becker	3	6	6	6
(Mexico) R Osuna (Mexico) A Palafox	6	3	4	4
(Socialist Federal Republic of Yugoslavia) I Panajotović (Socialist Federal Republic of Yugoslavia) I Plećević	6	6	6
(Austria) F Hainka (Austria) F Saiko	4	4	2
(Brazil) R Barnes (Brazil) C Fernandes	6	7	10
Q	(United States) T Frieberg (United States) D Junta	4	5	8
(United Kingdom) W Knight (United Kingdom) A Pickard	11	4	24
3	(United States) B MacKay (Australia) M Rose	13	6	26

Third round
(Australia) M Anderson (United Kingdom) R Becker	w/o
(Socialist Federal Republic of Yugoslavia) I Panajotović (Socialist Federal Republic of Yugoslavia) I Plećević
(Brazil) R Barnes (Brazil) C Fernandes	3	5	2
3	(United States) B MacKay (Australia) M Rose	6	7	6

Quarterfinals
(Socialist Federal Republic of Yugoslavia) I Panajotović (Socialist Federal Republic of Yugoslavia) I Plećević	3	7	3	2
3	(United States) B MacKay (Australia) M Rose	6	5	6	6

==== Section 4 ====
First round
(South Africa) Bertie Gaertner (South Africa) John Hurry	6	4	12	6	6
(United Kingdom) John Barrett (United Kingdom) Geoffrey Paish	3	6	14	3	2
(France) Pierre Darmon (France) Paul Rémy	6	6	4	6
(Italy) Alberto Lazzarino (Italy) Antonio Maggi	2	3	6	4
(United States) William Quillian (United States) Gilbert Shea	2	4	5
Q	(United Kingdom) Michael Hann (United Kingdom) Ivor Warwick	6	6	7
Q	(United Kingdom) John Sharpe (United Kingdom) John Watson	3	4	5
(United Kingdom) Mike Sangster (United Kingdom) Jimmy Tattersall	6	6	7
(Switzerland) Erwin Balestra (South Africa) Brian Murphy	4	4	2
(Socialist Federal Republic of Yugoslavia) Vladimir Petrović (Poland) Władysław Skonecki	6	6	6
(France) Jean Borotra (France) Jacques Mey	5	5	6	6	5
(Cuba) Reynaldo Garrido (Belgium) Jacques Peten	7	7	1	2	7
(Spain) Alberto Arilla (Spain) Andrés Gimeno	6	2	6
(Chile) Luis Ayala (Australia) Don Candy	8	6	8
Q	(United Kingdom) Keith Collar (United Kingdom) Derek Collins	3	2	4
1	(Australia) Ashley Cooper (Australia) Neale Fraser	6	6	6

Second round
(South Africa) A Gaertner (South Africa) J Hurry	10	2	5	3
(France) P Darmon (France) P Rémy	8	6	7	6
Q	(United Kingdom) M Hann (United Kingdom) I Warwick	6	6	6
(United Kingdom) M Sangster (United Kingdom) J Tattersall	2	2	3
(Socialist Federal Republic of Yugoslavia) V Petrović (Poland) W Skonecki	w/o
(Cuba) R Garrido (Belgium) J Peten
(Chile) L Ayala (Australia) D Candy	3	1	1
1	(Australia) A Cooper (Australia) N Fraser	6	6	6

Third round
(France) P Darmon (France) P Rémy	4	6	6	6
Q	(United Kingdom) M Hann (United Kingdom) I Warwick	6	1	4	4
(Cuba) R Garrido (Belgium) J Peten	2	3	4
1	(Australia) A Cooper (Australia) N Fraser	6	6	6

Quarterfinals
(France) P Darmon (France) P Rémy	3	5	3
1	(Australia) A Cooper (Australia) N Fraser	6	7	6
