= Ivko Plećević =

Serbian tennis player (1931–2021)

- Country (sports): Yugoslavia
- Born: 1931
- Died: 2021 (aged 90)

Singles

Grand Slam singles results
- French Open: 3R (1956)
- Wimbledon: 1R (1954, 1957, 1960)

Doubles

Grand Slam doubles results
- Wimbledon: QF (1958)

Ivko Plećević (1931–2021) was a Serbian tennis player.

Plećević, who worked at the ticket office of Belgrade's Tašmajdan tennis club as a teenager, competed for the Yugoslavia Davis Cup team from 1952 to 1958. He was a men's doubles quarter-finalist at the 1958 Wimbledon Championships, partnering Davis Cup teammate Ika Panajotovic. A 10-time Yugoslav national champion, Plećević moved to West Germany in the 1960s, but spent the later years of his life back in Belgrade.

The stolen Porsche car that was the focus of the 2009 film The Belgrade Phantom was owned by Plećević.

== See also ==
- List of Yugoslavia Davis Cup team representatives
