= 1958 Wimbledon Championships – Boys' singles =

Boys' singles
- 1958 Wimbledon Championships

Final
- Champion: (United States) Butch Buchholz
- Runner-up: (India) Premjit Lall
- Score: 6–1, 6–3

Events
Singles	men	women		boys	girls
Doubles	men	women	mixed	boys	girls
← 1957 ·	Wimbledon Championships	· 1959 →

Jimmy Tattersall was the defending champion, but lost to Premjit Lall in the semifinals.

Butch Buchholz defeated Lall in the final, 6–1, 6–3 to win the boys' singles tennis title at the 1958 Wimbledon Championships.

== Draw ==
Key

- Q = Qualifier
- WC = Wild card
- LL = Lucky loser
- Alt = Alternate
- ITF = ITF entry
- PR = Protected ranking
- SR = Special ranking
- SE = Special exempt
- JE = Junior exempt
- JR = Junior Accelerator Programme entrant
- CO = College Accelerator Programme entrant
- NG = Next Gen Accelerator Program entrant
- w/o = Walkover
- r = Retired
- d = Defaulted

=== Finals ===
Semifinals
(United States) Butch Buchholz	6	8	6
(Brazil) Ronnie Barnes	8	6	3
(India) Premjit Lall	6	6
(United Kingdom) Jimmy Tattersall	2	2

Final
(United States) Butch Buchholz	6	6
(India) Premjit Lall	1	3

=== Top half ===
First round
(Brazil) Ronnie Barnes	6	6
(Pakistan) A Ahmad	0	0
(Portugal) A Abreu	6	3	6
(Monaco) C Coste	3	6	4
(France) Alain Bresson	3	6
(Soviet Union) Andrei Potanin	6	8

Second round
(United States) Butch Buchholz	6	6
(Finland) Lassie Lincoln	4	1
(Lebanon) Karim Fawaz	3	2
(Denmark) Jan Leschly	6	6
(Italy) Guiliano Fanfani	0	1
(Brazil) R Barnes	6	6
(Portugal) A Abreu	1	0
(Soviet Union) A Potanin	6	6

Quarterfinals
(United States) E Buchholz	6	6
(Denmark) J Leschly	3	1
(Brazil) R Barnes	7	14
(Soviet Union) A Potanin	5	12

Semifinals
(United States) E Buchholz	6	8	6
(Brazil) R Barnes	8	6	3

=== Bottom half ===
First round
(Spain) José Luis Arilla	6	6
(Socialist Federal Republic of Yugoslavia) Srdjan Jelić	0	0
(Sweden) Thomas Hallberg	6	6
(Switzerland) Bernard Auberson	1	1
(Norway) TE Vold	1	3
(Republic of Ireland) Michael Hickey	6	6

Second round
(Spain) JL Arilla	3	7	6
(Sweden) T Hallberg	6	5	2
(Republic of Ireland) M Hickey	0	1
(India) Premjit Lall	6	6
(Poland) Piotr Jamroz	7	6
(Netherlands) Jan Beukers	5	3
(Austria) Peter Pokorny	0	5
(United Kingdom) Jimmy Tattersall	6	7

Quarterfinals
(Spain) JL Arilla	4	5
(India) P Lall	6	7
(Poland) P Jamroz	6	2	4
(United Kingdom) J Tattersall	2	6	6

Semifinals
(India) P Lall	6	6
(United Kingdom) J Tattersall	2	2
