= 1958 Wimbledon Championships – Women's doubles =

Women's doubles
- 1958 Wimbledon Championships

Final
- Champions: (Brazil) Maria Bueno (United States) Althea Gibson
- Runners-up: (United States) Margaret duPont (United States) Margaret Varner
- Score: 6–3, 7–5

Details
- Draw: 48 (5 Q )
- Seeds: 4

Events
Singles	men	women		boys	girls
Doubles	men	women	mixed	boys	girls
← 1957 ·	Wimbledon Championships	· 1959 →

Two-time defending champion Althea Gibson and her partner Maria Bueno defeated Margaret duPont and Margaret Varner in the final, 6–3, 7–5 to win the ladies' doubles tennis title at the 1958 Wimbledon Championships.

Gibson and Darlene Hard were the reigning champions, but Hard did not compete.

== Seeds ==
1. (Brazil) Maria Bueno / (United States) Althea Gibson (champions)
2. (United Kingdom) Shirley Bloomer / (United Kingdom) Christine Truman (third round)
3. (Australia) Mary Hawton / (Australia) Thelma Long (semifinals)
4. (Mexico) Yola Ramírez / (Mexico) Rosie Reyes (semifinals)

Click on the seed number of a player to go to their draw section.

== Draw ==
=== Key ===
- Q = Qualifier
- WC = Wild card
- LL = Lucky loser
- Alt = Alternate
- SE = Special exempt
- PR = Protected ranking
- ITF = ITF entry
- JE = Junior exempt
- w/o = Walkover
- r = Retired
- d = Defaulted
- SR = Special ranking

=== Finals ===
Quarterfinals
(United States) Margaret duPont (United States) Margaret Varner	3	6	6
(West Germany) Edda Buding (West Germany) Ilse Buding	6	1	4
4	(Mexico) Yola Ramírez (Mexico) Rosie Reyes	6	6
(United Kingdom) Gill Evans (United Kingdom) Pat Hird	3	4
(United Kingdom) Anne Shilcock (United Kingdom) Pat Ward	3	6	1
3	(Australia) Mary Hawton (Australia) Thelma Long	6	4	6
(France) Susan Chatrier (United Kingdom) Angela Mortimer	0	0
1	(Brazil) Maria Bueno (United States) Althea Gibson	6	6

Semifinals
(United States) Margaret duPont (United States) Margaret Varner	6	6
4	(Mexico) Yola Ramírez (Mexico) Rosie Reyes	2	3
(Australia) Mary Hawton (Australia) Thelma Long	3	2
1	(Brazil) Maria Bueno (United States) Althea Gibson	6	6

Final
(United States) Margaret duPont (United States) Margaret Varner	3	5
1	(Brazil) Maria Bueno (United States) Althea Gibson	6	7

=== Top half ===
==== Section 1 ====
First round

Second round
2	(United Kingdom) Shirley Bloomer (United Kingdom) Christine Truman	6	6
(Switzerland) Ruth Kaufmann (Switzerland) Veronika Studer	1	0
(Spain) Mercedes Solsona (Spain) Mary Terán de Weiss	0	1
(United States) Margaret duPont (United States) Margaret Varner	6	6
Q	(United Kingdom) Bridget Chamberlain (United Kingdom) Jean Knight	0	1
(West Germany) Edda Buding (West Germany) Ilse Buding	6	6
(Australia) Lorraine Coghlan (Australia) Fay Muller	8	6
(New Zealand) Sonia Cox (New Zealand) Ruia Morrison	6	4

Third round
2	(United Kingdom) S Bloomer (United Kingdom) C Truman	2	2
(United States) M duPont (United States) M Varner	6	6
(West Germany) E Buding (West Germany) I Buding	6	3	7
(Australia) L Coghlan (Australia) F Muller	2	6	5

Quarterfinals
(United States) M duPont (United States) M Varner	3	6	6
(West Germany) E Buding (West Germany) I Buding	6	1	4

==== Section 2 ====
First round
4	(Mexico) Yola Ramírez (Mexico) Rosie Reyes	6	6
(Australia) Margaret Carter (Italy) Silvana Lazzarino	1	1
(France) Paule Courteix (France) Maud Galtier	0	6	1
(United Kingdom) Mary Chamberlain (United Kingdom) Viola White	6	4	6
Q	(United Kingdom) Carole Levy (Australia) D McCamley	5	6	6
(Austria) Elizabeth Broz (Austria) Sonja Pachta	7	2	1
(United Kingdom) MG Fry (United Kingdom) Gwen Scott	5	1
(United Kingdom) Jill Rook (United Kingdom) Caroline Yates-Bell	7	6
(United Kingdom) Gill Evans (United Kingdom) Pat Hird	7	7
(United Kingdom) Pearl Panton (United Kingdom) Vera Thomas	5	5
Q	(United Kingdom) Honor Durose (New Zealand) Pat Nettleton	6	5	4
(United Kingdom) Marian Boundy (United Kingdom) Pat Wheeler	2	7	6
(United States) Janet Hopps (United States) Sally Moore	6	3	6
(United Kingdom) Deidre Catt (United Kingdom) Jenny Trewby	1	6	2
(United Kingdom) Sheila Armstrong (United Kingdom) Ann Haydon	6	3	6
(South Africa) Bernice Carr (South Africa) Jean Forbes	4	6	2

Second round
4	(Mexico) Y Ramírez (Mexico) R Reyes	7	6	6
(United Kingdom) M Chamberlain (United Kingdom) V White	9	1	0
Q	(United Kingdom) C Levy (Australia) D McCamley	6	4	1
(United Kingdom) J Rook (United Kingdom) C Yates-Bell	3	6	6
(United Kingdom) G Evans (United Kingdom) P Hird	6	6
(United Kingdom) M Boundy (United Kingdom) P Wheeler	3	2
(United States) J Hopps (United States) S Moore	8	8
(United Kingdom) S Armstrong (United Kingdom) A Haydon	6	9^{r}

Third round
4	(Mexico) Y Ramírez (Mexico) R Reyes	6	9
(United Kingdom) J Rook (United Kingdom) C Yates-Bell	1	7
(United Kingdom) G Evans (United Kingdom) P Hird
(United States) J Hopps (United States) S Moore	w/o

Quarterfinals
4	(Mexico) Y Ramírez (Mexico) R Reyes	6	6
(United Kingdom) G Evans (United Kingdom) P Hird	3	4

=== Bottom half ===
==== Section 3 ====
First round
(United Kingdom) Gem Hoahing (Norway) Ida Wrede-Holm	2	5
(France) Marie-Odile Bouchet (France) Florence de la Courtie	6	7
(Belgium) Poucette Bernheim (United Kingdom) Jean Bostock	4	6	6
(United Kingdom) Evelyn Fulton (United Kingdom) Joyce Fulton	6	2	2
(United Kingdom) Jenny Wagstaff (United Kingdom) Bobbie Wilson	6	6
Q	(Kenya) Fran Marshall (United Kingdom) Regina Thackray	1	3
(United Kingdom) Anne Shilcock (United Kingdom) Pat Ward
(Netherlands) Fredy Marinkelle (Netherlands) Joopy Roos-Van der Wal	w/o
(Belgium) Christiane Mercelis (South Africa) Heather Segal	2	2
(South Africa) Sandra Reynolds (South Africa) Renée Schuurman	6	6
(United States) Louise Snow (West Germany) Ingeborg Vogler	4	8	7
(United Kingdom) Jennifer Chamberlain (United Kingdom) Sonia Cox	6	6	5
(United Kingdom) Rosemary Deloford (United Kingdom) Billie Woodgate	6	7
(United States) Geraldine Carter (Chile) Carmen Ibarra	4	5
(Australia) Margaret Hellyer (Hungary) Zsuzsa Körmöczy	6	1
3	(Australia) Mary Hawton (Australia) Thelma Long	8	6

Second round
(France) M-O Bouchet (France) F de la Courtie
(Belgium) P Bernheim (United Kingdom) J Bostock	w/o
(United Kingdom) J Wagstaff (United Kingdom) B Wilson	1	2
(United Kingdom) A Shilcock (United Kingdom) P Ward	6	6
(South Africa) S Reynolds (South Africa) R Schuurman	6	6
(United States) L Snow (West Germany) I Vogler	2	3
(United Kingdom) R Deloford (United Kingdom) R Woodgate	2	4
3	(Australia) M Hawton (Australia) T Long	6	6

Third round
(France) M-O Bouchet (France) F de la Courtie	4	4
(United Kingdom) A Shilcock (United Kingdom) P Ward	6	6
(South Africa) S Reynolds (South Africa) R Schuurman	5	2
3	(Australia) M Hawton (Australia) T Long	7	6

Quarterfinals
(United Kingdom) A Shilcock (United Kingdom) P Ward	3	6	1
3	(Australia) M Hawton (Australia) T Long	6	4	6

==== Section 4 ====
First round

Second round
(Spain) Pilar Barril (Spain) Alicia Guri	7	1	3
(United Kingdom) Rita Bentley (United Kingdom) Sheila Bramley	5	6	6
(United Kingdom) Barbara Knapp (United Kingdom) Jenny Young	1	3
(France) Susan Chatrier (United Kingdom) Angela Mortimer	6	6
Q	(United Kingdom) Anthea Warwick (United Kingdom) Sue Waters	4	2
(United States) Karol Fageros (United States) Dorothy Knode	6	6
(West Germany) Margot Dittmeyer (West Germany) Erika Vollmer	2	2
1	(Brazil) Maria Bueno (United States) Althea Gibson	6	6

Third round
(United Kingdom) R Bentley (United Kingdom) S Bramley	1	3
(France) S Chatrier (United Kingdom) A Mortimer	6	6
(United States) K Fageros (United States) D Knode	4	3
1	(Brazil) M Bueno (United States) A Gibson	6	6

Quarterfinals
(France) S Chatrier (United Kingdom) A Mortimer	0	0
1	(Brazil) M Bueno (United States) A Gibson	6	6
