= 1958 Wightman Cup =

International women's tennis competition

Details
- Edition: 30th

Champion
- Winning nation: Great Britain

The 1958 Wightman Cup was the 30th edition of the annual women's team tennis competition between the United States and Great Britain. It was held at the All England Lawn Tennis and Croquet Club in London in England in the United Kingdom.

Great Britain
4
All England Lawn Tennis and Croquet Club, London, England, United Kingdom
1958
Grass

United States
3

			1	2	3
1	(United Kingdom) (United States)	Shirley Bloomer; Althea Gibson	3; 6	4; 6
2	(United Kingdom) (United States)	Christine Truman; Dorothy Head Knode	6; 4	6; 4
3	(United Kingdom) (United States)	Shirley Bloomer; Dorothy Head Knode	4; 6	2; 6
4	(United Kingdom) (United States)	Christine Truman; Althea Gibson	2; 6	6; 3	6; 4
5	(United Kingdom) (United States)	Ann Haydon; Mimi Arnold	6; 3	5; 7	6; 3
6	(United Kingdom) (United States)	Shirley Bloomer / Christine Truman; Karol Fageros / Dorothy Head Knode	6; 2	6; 3
7	(United Kingdom) (United States)	Anne Shilcock / Patricia Ward; Althea Gibson / Janet Hopps	4; 6	6; 3	3; 6
