= Day of the Assassin =

- Directed by: Brian Trenchard-Smith; Carlos Vasallo
- Screenplay by: Robert Avard Miller
- Based on: Traitors in the Lake by Robin Estridge
- Produced by: Carlos Vasallo; Robin Lubin; Ika Panajotovic
- Starring: Chuck Connors; Glenn Ford; Richard Roundtree; Jorge Rivero; Susana Dosamantes; Henry Silva; Andrés García
- Cinematography: Leopoldo Villaseñor
- Edited by: Keith Stafford
- Music by: Bebu Silvetti
- Production companies: Noble Production Inc. Plata Films; Producciones Esme
- Distributed by: American National Enterprise (US); Líder Films (Spain)
- Release date: 1979
- Running time: 94 minutes
- Countries: United States; Spain; Mexico
- Language: English

Day of the Assassin (Spanish: El día de los asesinos) is a 1979 American-Spanish-Mexican action film directed by Brian Trenchard-Smith, who called it "a trainwreck of a movie."

== Premise ==
Various treasure hunters journey to Mexico to find a fortune at the bottom of the ocean.

== Cast ==
- Chuck Connors as Fleming
- Glenn Ford as Christakis
- Richard Roundtree as Fessler
- Jorge Rivero as Dante Vallone
- Susana Dosamantes as The Princess
- Henry Silva as Police Chief Jorge Gomez
- Andrés García as Jerry Beltron
- Tawny Little as TV Announcer
- Taylor Lacher as Spiros
- Juan Luis Galiardo as Vasilenko
- Robert Avard Miller as Russian Agent

== Production ==
Day of the Assassin was shot in Mexico and was an international co-production between Mexico, Spain and the United States. According to Trenchard-Smith, the original director was to be Leslie Martinson, who had just made Missile X – Geheimauftrag Neutronenbombe for producer Ika Panajotovic. However, Martinson left the project when his deposit did not arrive. Martinson and Trenchard-Smith shared the same agent; he persuaded the producers to hire Trenchard-Smith on the basis he had made "a Bruce Lee film" (in actuality a documentary about Lee produced in the wake of his death, The World of Kung Fu); the producers thought they were getting Enter the Dragon director Robert Clouse and were disappointed to discover it was Trenchard-Smith.

The female lead was meant to be Jill St. John, but she left the project when her deposit did not arrive. She was replaced by Susana Dosamantes, who was dating Carlos Vasallo, the film's Spanish producer.

Trenchard-Smith says Glenn Ford was to be paid $100,000 for two days' work and that his friend, Taylor Lacher, would be given a role. This part had been promised to the writer, Robert Avard Miller, who was subsequently given a smaller part.

Trenchard-Smith was fired during the sixth and last week of filming after refusing to shoot a sequence in which Chuck Connors' character shoots and kills several guards while committing a robbery, as he was concerned that such a scene would prevent audiences from rooting for his character. Vasallo took over for the final few days, and is credited as co-director on some prints of the film.

== Reception ==
In his review of the film "Vern" said "The story is all made up of things you’ve seen a million times before, but I like these kind of things... it’s a pretty crappy movie and didn’t really keep my interest the whole time, but there’s something about it. I like those types of competing experts movies, it’s a good slumming cast and there’s just kind of a cool vibe to it."
