= 1958 Wimbledon Championships – Mixed doubles =

Mixed doubles
- 1958 Wimbledon Championships

Final
- Champions: (Australia) Bob Howe (Australia) Lorraine Coghlan
- Runners-up: (Denmark) Kurt Nielsen (United States) Althea Gibson
- Score: 6–3, 13–11

Details
- Draw: 80 (5Q)
- Seeds: 4

Events
Singles	men	women		boys	girls
Doubles	men	women	mixed	boys	girls
← 1957 ·	Wimbledon Championships	· 1959 →

Mervyn Rose and Darlene Hard were the defending champions, but did not compete.

Bob Howe and Lorraine Coghlan defeated Kurt Nielsen and Althea Gibson in the final, 6–3, 13–11 to win the mixed doubles tennis title at the 1958 Wimbledon Championships.

== Seeds ==
1. (Australia) Neale Fraser / (United States) Margaret duPont (second round)
2. (Denmark) Kurt Nielsen / (United States) Althea Gibson (final)
3. (Chile) Luis Ayala / (Australia) Thelma Long (quarterfinals)
4. (Australia) Bob Howe / (Australia) Lorraine Coghlan (champions)

Click on the seed number of a player to go to their draw section.

== Draw ==
Key

- Q = Qualifier
- WC = Wild card
- LL = Lucky loser
- Alt = Alternate
- ITF = ITF entry
- PR = Protected ranking
- SR = Special ranking
- SE = Special exempt
- JE = Junior exempt
- JR = Junior Accelerator Programme entrant
- CO = College Accelerator Programme entrant
- NG = Next Gen Accelerator Program entrant
- w/o = Walkover
- r = Retired
- d = Defaulted

=== Finals ===
Quarterfinals
(United States) Bob Perry (United States) Margaret Varner	7	5
(Mexico) Francisco Contreras (Mexico) Rosie Reyes	9	7
4	(Australia) Bob Howe (Australia) Lorraine Coghlan	6	6
(Poland) Władysław Skonecki (United States) Karol Fageros	2	3
(United Kingdom) Billy Knight (United Kingdom) Shirley Bloomer	7	6
3	(Chile) Luis Ayala (Australia) Thelma Long	5	4
(South Africa) Bertie Gaertner (South Africa) Sandra Reynolds	2	3
2	(Denmark) Kurt Nielsen (United States) Althea Gibson	6	6

Semifinals
(Mexico) Francisco Contreras (Mexico) Rosie Reyes	4	4
4	(Australia) Bob Howe (Australia) Lorraine Coghlan	6	6
(United Kingdom) Billy Knight (United Kingdom) Shirley Bloomer	5	3
2	(Denmark) Kurt Nielsen (United States) Althea Gibson	7	6

Final
4	(Australia) Bob Howe (Australia) Lorraine Coghlan	6	13
2	(Denmark) Kurt Nielsen (United States) Althea Gibson	3	11

=== Top half ===
==== Section 1 ====
First round

Second round
1	(Australia) Neale Fraser (United States) Margaret duPont	6	3^{r}
(United States) Bob Perry (United States) Margaret Varner	2	2
(Australia) Allan Kendall (United States) Isabel Troccole	3	3
(Austria) Franz Hainka (Austria) Elizabeth Broz	6	6
(South Africa) John Hurry (South Africa) Jean Forbes	6	6
(Spain) Alberto Arilla (France) Paule Courteix	3	1
(Denmark) Søren Højberg (South Africa) Bernice Carr	11	6
(United Kingdom) John Ward (United Kingdom) Leonie Brighton	9	4

Third round
(United States) R Perry (United States) M Varner	6	12
(Austria) F Hainka (Austria) E Broz	3	10
(South Africa) J Hurry (South Africa) J Forbes
(Denmark) S Højberg (South Africa) B Carr	w/o

Fourth round
(United States) R Perry (United States) M Varner	6	4	6
(South Africa) J Hurry (South Africa) J Forbes	2	6	3

==== Section 2 ====
First round

Second round
(France) Pierre Darmon (France) Florence de la Courtie
(Netherlands) Pieter van Eijsden (Netherlands) Fredy Marinkelle	w/o
(United Kingdom) Reg Bennett (United Kingdom) Sheila Armstrong	6	7
(Chile) Andrés Hammersley (United States) Gloria Butler	2	5
(United Kingdom) Andrew Yates-Bell (United Kingdom) Caroline Yates-Bell	3	5
(Mexico) Francisco Contreras (Mexico) Rosie Reyes	6	7
(Republic of Ireland) Tommy Crooks (Republic of Ireland) June Fitzpatrick	3	6	6
(Spain) Andrés Gimeno (Spain) Mary Terán de Weiss	6	4	3

Third round
(France) P Darmon (France) F de la Courtie
(United Kingdom) R Bennett (United Kingdom) S Armstrong	w/o
(Mexico) F Contreras (Mexico) R Reyes	6	6
(Republic of Ireland) T Crooks (Republic of Ireland) J Fitzpatrick	1	2

Fourth round
(France) P Darmon (France) F de la Courtie	2	6	2
(Mexico) F Contreras (Mexico) R Reyes	6	1	6

==== Section 3 ====
First round

Second round
4	(Australia) Bob Howe (Australia) Lorraine Coghlan	4	9	6
(Poland) Andrzej Licis (Australia) Margaret Carter	6	7	1
(India) Ramanathan Krishnan (Australia) Mary Hawton	4	5
(United States) Gardnar Mulloy (Brazil) Maria Bueno	6	7
(United Kingdom) Eric Crump (United Kingdom) Mrs NR Allport	2	2
(United Kingdom) Geoffrey Paish (United Kingdom) Anne Shilcock	6	6
(France) Robert Haillet (France) Annie Haillet	3	5
(Venezuela) Isaías Pimentel (United Kingdom) Jean Bostock	6	7

Third round
4	(Australia) R Howe (Australia) L Coghlan	3	6	6
(United States) G Mulloy (Brazil) M Bueno	6	4	1
(United Kingdom) G Paish (United Kingdom) A Shilcock	6	6
(Venezuela) I Pimentel (United Kingdom) J Bostock	3	0

Fourth round
4	(Australia) R Howe (Australia) L Coghlan	6	6
(United Kingdom) G Paish (United Kingdom) A Shilcock	4	4

==== Section 4 ====
First round
(Poland) Władysław Skonecki (United States) Karol Fageros	6	6
(New Zealand) Peter Nicholls (New Zealand) Sonia Cox	3	2
(United States) Nick Carter (United States) Mimi Arnold	6	6
(United Kingdom) Tony Pickard (United Kingdom) Pat Ward	3	4
(United Kingdom) Gerry Oakley (United Kingdom) Honor Clarke	9	7	4
(Sweden) Sven Davidson (United States) Louise Snow	7	9	6
(Australia) Wayne Reid (West Germany) Ilse Buding	6	2	6
(Poland) Czesław Spychała (United Kingdom) Bea Walter	4	6	1
(France) Jean Borotra (France) Marie-Odile Bouchet	6	1	10
(United States) Chauncey Steele (United Kingdom) Pat Hird	1	6	8
Q	(Australia) Paul Hearnden (United Kingdom) Bobbie Wilson	3	5
(Australia) Warren Woodcock (United States) Dorothy Knode	6	7
(United Kingdom) Howard Walton (United Kingdom) Barbara Knapp	2	5
(Australia) Don Candy (South Africa) Heather Segal	6	7
(Hungary) István Sikorszki (West Germany) Ingeborg Vogler	2
(Chile) Patricio Rodríguez (Chile) Carmen Ibarra	0^{r}

Second round
(Poland) W Skonecki (United States) K Fageros	7	6
(United States) C Carter (United States) M Arnold	5	4
(Sweden) S Davidson (United States) L Snow	6	7
(Australia) W Reid (West Germany) I Buding	3	5
(France) J Borotra (France) M-O Bouchet	9	1	6
(Australia) Warren Woodcock (United States) Dorothy Knode	7	6	3
(Australia) D Candy (South Africa) H Segal	w/o
(Hungary) I Sikorszki (West Germany) I Vogler

Third round
(Poland) W Skonecki (United States) K Fageros	7	6
(Sweden) S Davidson (United States) L Snow	5	1
(France) J Borotra (France) M-O Bouchet	4	6	3
(Hungary) I Sikorszki (West Germany) I Vogler	6	4	6

Fourth round
(Poland) W Skonecki (United States) K Fageros	6	6
(Hungary) I Sikorszki (West Germany) I Vogler	2	4

=== Bottom half ===
==== Section 5 ====
First round
(India) Narendra Nath (Switzerland) Ruth Kaufmann	3	6	0^{r}
(India) Premjit Lall (Belgium) Christiane Mercelis	6	3	0
(Switzerland) Erwin Balestra (Switzerland) Veronika Studer	w/o
(Hungary) Antal Jancsó (South Africa) Renée Schuurman
(United Kingdom) Billy Knight (United Kingdom) Shirley Bloomer	6	6
(Australia) Barry Kearney (United Kingdom) Gem Hoahing	0	2
Q	(Australia) Graeme Stewart (United Kingdom) Honor Durose	6	7	13
(United Kingdom) John Barrett (United Kingdom) Gill Evans	8	5	11
(United Kingdom) Eric Bulmer (United Kingdom) Pat Wheeler
(Spain) Emilio Martínez (Spain) Alicia Guri	w/o
(Australia) Dennis Reilly (New Zealand) Pat Nettleton	3	4
(Egypt) Jaroslav Drobný (United Kingdom) Rita Drobný	6	6
(Cuba) Orlando Garrido (Australia) Margaret Hellyer	4	3
(United Kingdom) Geoff Ward (United Kingdom) Marian Boundy	6	6
(United Kingdom) Roger Becker (United Kingdom) Ann Haydon	6	6
(United Kingdom) Basil Hutchins (United Kingdom) Mary Chamberlain	0	2

Second round
(India) P Lall (Belgium) C Mercelis	6	5	3
(Hungary) A Jancsó (South Africa) R Schuurman	4	7	6
(United Kingdom) W Knight (United Kingdom) S Bloomer	6	6
(Australia) G Stewart (United Kingdom) H Durose	3	4
(United Kingdom) E Bulmer (United Kingdom) P Wheeler
(Egypt) J Drobný (United Kingdom) R Drobný	w/o
(United Kingdom) G Ward (United Kingdom) M Boundy	2	2
(United Kingdom) R Becker (United Kingdom) A Haydon	6	6

Third round
(Hungary) A Jancsó (South Africa) R Schuurman	2	2
(United Kingdom) W Knight (United Kingdom) S Bloomer	6	6
(United Kingdom) E Bulmer (United Kingdom) P Wheeler	7	7	2
(United Kingdom) R Becker (United Kingdom) A Haydon	9	5	6

Fourth round
(United Kingdom) W Knight (United Kingdom) S Bloomer	6	6
(United Kingdom) R Becker (United Kingdom) A Haydon	2	4

==== Section 6 ====
First round

Second round
Q	(United Kingdom) Tommy Anderson (United Kingdom) Jean Knight	6	6
Q	(United Kingdom) Ivor Warwick (United Kingdom) Anthea Warwick	1	4
(Austria) Franz Saiko (Austria) Sonja Pachta	6	3	2
(France) Paul Rémy (France) Susan Chatrier	4	6	6
(Australia) Bob Mark (Australia) Fay Muller	2	6	6
(Mexico) Antonio Palafox (Mexico) Yola Ramírez	6	2	3
(United Kingdom) Freddie Field (United Kingdom) Hazel Cheadle	3	1
3	(Chile) Luis Ayala (Australia) Thelma Long	6	6

Third round
(United Kingdom) T Anderson (United Kingdom) J Knight	2	2
(France) P Rémy (France) S Chatrier	6	6
(Australia) R Mark (Australia) F Muller	6	2	6
3	(Chile) L Ayala (Australia) T Long	4	6	8

Fourth round
(France) P Rémy (France) S Chatrier	4	2
3	(Chile) L Ayala (Australia) T Long	6	6

==== Section 7 ====
First round

Second round
(South Africa) Bertie Gaertner (South Africa) Sandra Reynolds	6	6	6
(Italy) Alberto Lazzarino (Italy) Silvana Lazzarino	8	2	3
(West Germany) Wilhelm Bungert (West Germany) Erika Vollmer	6	7
(Netherlands) Willem Maris (Netherlands) Joopy Roos-Van der Wal	3	5
(Hungary) István Gulyás (France) Maud Galtier	w/o
(New Zealand) Lew Gerrard (New Zealand) Ruia Morrison
Q	(United Kingdom) Gerald Smith (United Kingdom) Norma Kemsey-Bourne	1	2
(United States) William Quillian (United States) Janet Hopps	6	6

Third round
(South Africa) A Gaertner (South Africa) S Reynolds
(West Germany) W Bungert (West Germany) E Vollmer	w/o
(New Zealand) L Gerrard (New Zealand) R Morrison	3	10	2
(United States) W Quillian (United States) J Hopps	6	8	6

Fourth round
(South Africa) A Gaertner (South Africa) S Reynolds
(United States) W Quillian (United States) J Hopps	w/o

==== Section 8 ====
First round

Second round
(United Kingdom) Jimmy Tattersall (United Kingdom) Deidre Catt
(Spain) Jaime Bartrolí (Spain) Pilar Barril	w/o
(Brazil) Ivo Ribeiro (United Kingdom) Sheila Bramley	2	3
(Australia) Rod Laver (United Kingdom) Christine Truman	6	6
(India) Naresh Kumar (West Germany) Edda Buding	6	6
(Federation of Rhodesia and Nyasaland) Roy Stilwell (United Kingdom) Jennifer Chamberlain	4	1
(United Kingdom) Alan Mills (United Kingdom) Jill Rook	4	5
2	(Denmark) Kurt Nielsen (United States) Althea Gibson	6	7

Third round
(United Kingdom) J Tattersall (United Kingdom) D Catt	4	5
(Australia) R Laver (United Kingdom) C Truman	6	7
(India) N Kumar (West Germany) E Buding	7	4
2	(Denmark) K Nielsen (United States) A Gibson	9	6

Fourth round
(Australia) R Laver (United Kingdom) C Truman	4	3
2	(Denmark) K Nielsen (United States) A Gibson	6	6
