= 1958 Wimbledon Championships – Women's singles =

Women's singles
- 1958 Wimbledon Championships

Final
- Champion: (United States) Althea Gibson
- Runner-up: (United Kingdom) Angela Mortimer
- Score: 8–6, 6–2

Details
- Draw: 96 (10 Q )
- Seeds: 8

Events
Singles	men	women		boys	girls
Doubles	men	women	mixed	boys	girls
← 1957 ·	Wimbledon Championships	· 1959 →

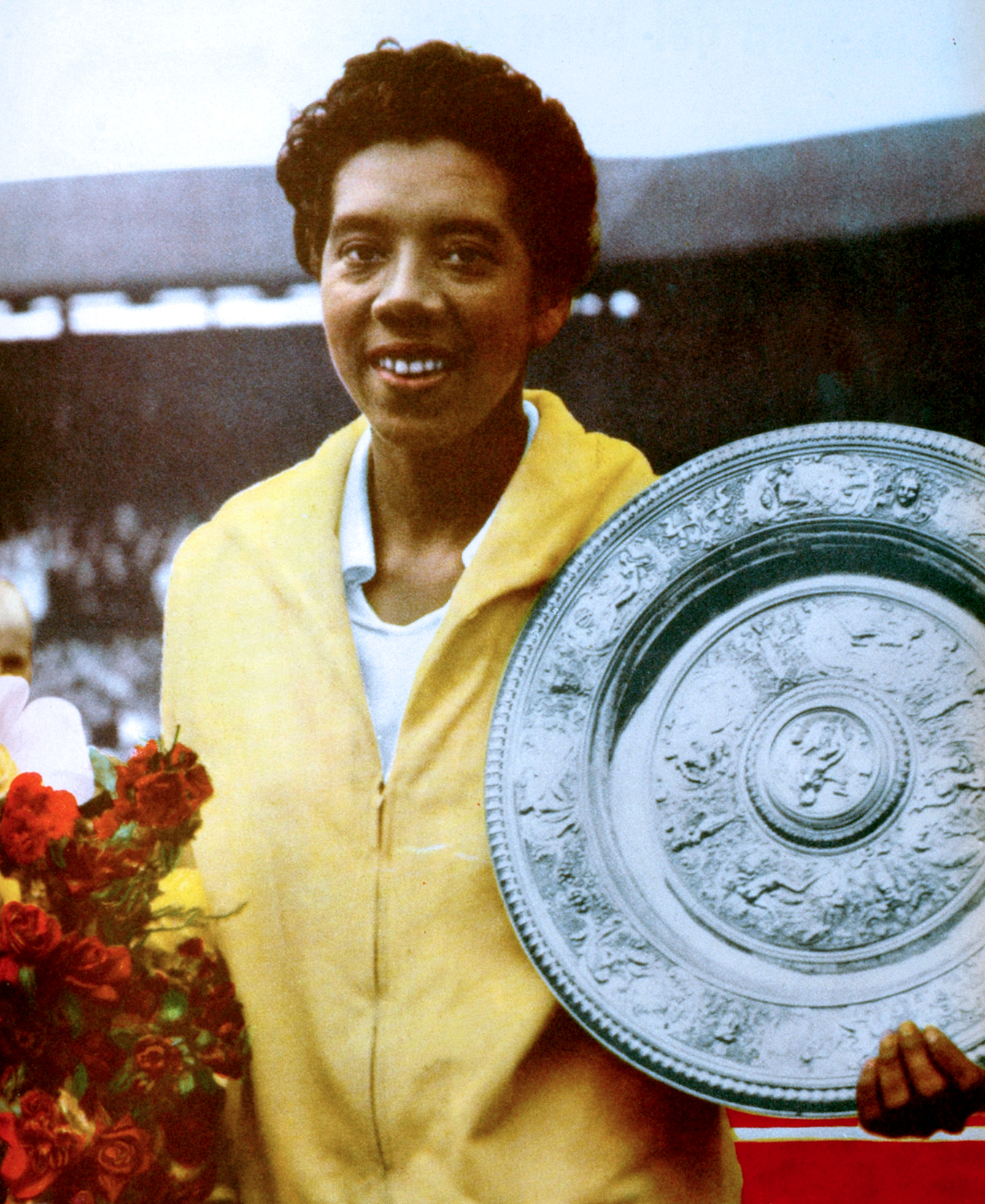
Althea Gibson, 1958 champion

Defending champion Althea Gibson defeated Angela Mortimer in the final, 8–6, 6–2 to win the ladies' singles tennis title at the 1958 Wimbledon Championships.

== Seeds ==
1. (United States) Althea Gibson (champion)
2. (United Kingdom) Christine Truman (fourth round)
3. (United States) Dorothy Knode (second round)
4. (Brazil) Maria Bueno (quarterfinals)
5. (United Kingdom) Shirley Bloomer (quarterfinals)
6. (Hungary) Zsuzsa Körmöczy (semifinals)
7. (United States) Janet Hopps (second round)
8. (United States) Karol Fageros (third round)

Click on the seed number of a player to go to their draw section.

== Draw ==
=== Key ===
- Q = Qualifier
- WC = Wild card
- LL = Lucky loser
- Alt = Alternate
- SE = Special exempt
- PR = Protected ranking
- ITF = ITF entry
- JE = Junior exempt
- w/o = Walkover
- r = Retired
- d = Defaulted
- SR = Special ranking

=== Finals ===
Quarterfinals
(United States) Mimi Arnold	1	7	6
6	(Hungary) Zsuzsa Körmöczy	6	5	8
(United Kingdom) Angela Mortimer	4	6	10
(United States) Margaret duPont	6	3	8
(United Kingdom) Ann Haydon	6	7
4	(Brazil) Maria Bueno	3	5
5	(United Kingdom) Shirley Bloomer	3	8	2
1	(United States) Althea Gibson	6	6	6

Semifinals
6	(Hungary) Zsuzsa Körmöczy	0	1
(United Kingdom) Angela Mortimer	6	6
(United Kingdom) Ann Haydon	2	0
1	(United States) Althea Gibson	6	6

Final
(United Kingdom) Angela Mortimer	6	2
1	(United States) Althea Gibson	8	6

=== Top half ===
==== Section 1 ====
First round

Second round
2	(United Kingdom) Christine Truman	6	6
(United Kingdom) Rosemary Deloford	0	1
(New Zealand) Pat Nettleton	4	6
(United Kingdom) Jill Rook	6	8
(United States) Mimi Arnold	2	6	6
(United Kingdom) Pat Wheeler	6	3	0
(West Germany) Erika Vollmer	6	6
(Switzerland) Veronika Studer	4	4

Third round
2	(United Kingdom) C Truman	6	6
(United Kingdom) J Rook	3	1
(United States) M Arnold	6	8
(West Germany) E Vollmer	2	6

Fourth round
2	(United Kingdom) C Truman	8	3
(United States) M Arnold	10	6

==== Section 2 ====
First round

Second round
6	(Hungary) Zsuzsa Körmöczy	6	6
(France) Florence de la Courtie	4	2
(Austria) Sonja Pachta	4	1
(South Africa) Heather Segal	6	6
(Argentina) Mary Terán de Weiss	6	6
(Kenya) Fran Marshall	2	4
(Australia) Mary Hawton	6	6
(Netherlands) Joopy Roos-Van der Wal	2	0

Third round
6	(Hungary) Z Körmöczy	6	6
(South Africa) H Segal	2	3
(Spain) M Terán de Weiss	4	1
(Australia) M Hawton	6	6

Fourth round
6	(Hungary) Z Körmöczy	6	6
(Australia) M Hawton	2	1

==== Section 3 ====
First round
3	(United States) Dorothy Knode	7	6
Q	(United Kingdom) Pauline Roberts	5	2
(Belgium) Christiane Mercelis	6	6
(United Kingdom) Sue Waters	2	1
Q	(United Kingdom) Anthea Warwick
(France) Susan Chatrier	w/o
(United Kingdom) Gill Worrall	6	6	1
(United Kingdom) Sonia Cox	8	2	6
(United Kingdom) Gem Hoahing	0	1
(West Germany) Edda Buding	6	6
(United Kingdom) Vera Thomas	1	9	6
(West Germany) Ingeborg Vogler	6	7	2
(Spain) Mercedes Solsona	0	2
(South Africa) Sandra Reynolds	6	6
(United Kingdom) Angela Mortimer	6	6
(Chile) Carmen Ibarra	0	2

Second round
3	(United States) D Knode	3	5
(Belgium) C Mercelis	6	7
Q	(United Kingdom) A Warwick	6	1	6
(United Kingdom) S Cox	4	6	2
(West Germany) E Buding	6	6
(United Kingdom) V Thomas	3	1
(South Africa) S Reynolds	8	2	0
(United Kingdom) A Mortimer	6	6	6

Third round
(Belgium) C Mercelis	6	6
Q	(United Kingdom) A Warwick	0	2
(West Germany) E Buding	2	4
(United Kingdom) A Mortimer	6	6

Fourth round
(Belgium) C Mercelis	3	4
(United Kingdom) A Mortimer	6	6

==== Section 4 ====
First round
7	(United States) Janet Hopps	6	6
(United Kingdom) Jean Bostock	3	3
(France) Marie-Odile Bouchet	2	2
(Australia) Norma Marsh	6	6
(Republic of Ireland) June Fitzpatrick	2	2
(United Kingdom) Joyce Fulton	6	6
(United Kingdom) Pearl Panton	3	0
(United States) Margaret duPont	6	6
Q	(United Kingdom) Caroline Leather	8	7
Q	(United Kingdom) Shirley Hannah	6	5
(United Kingdom) Rita Bentley	1	6	0
(Mexico) Rosie Reyes	6	4	6
(United States) Wilma Smith	4	5
(New Zealand) Sonia Cox	6	7
(Australia) Fay Muller	6	6
(United Kingdom) Jean Knight	0	1

Second round
7	(United States) J Hopps	5	7
(Australia) N Marsh	7	9
(United Kingdom) J Fulton	1	0
(United States) M duPont	6	6
Q	(United Kingdom) C Leather	1	8
(Mexico) R Reyes	6	10
(New Zealand) S Cox	5	3
(Australia) F Muller	7	6

Third round
(Australia) N Marsh	3	6	6
(United States) M duPont	6	3	8
(Mexico) R Reyes	3	5
(Australia) F Muller	6	7

Fourth round
(United States) M duPont	6	6
(Australia) F Muller	3	2

=== Bottom half ===
==== Section 5 ====
First round
Q	(United Kingdom) Jenny Young	1	1
(United Kingdom) Ann Haydon	6	6
(West Germany) Ilse Buding	5	4
(United States) Margaret Varner	7	6
Q	(United Kingdom) Margaret Grace	6	0	1
(Spain) Pilar Barril	3	6	6
(United Kingdom) Gill Evans	1	4
(South Africa) Jean Forbes	6	6
(United Kingdom) Pat Hird	3	2
(United Kingdom) Pat Ward	6	6
(United Kingdom) Thelma Lister	6	7	7
Q	(United Kingdom) Bobbie Wilson	4	9	5
(Belgium) Poucette Bernheim	1	2
(Italy) Silvana Lazzarino	6	6
(United States) Sally Moore	3	5
8	(United States) Karol Fageros	6	7

Second round
(United Kingdom) A Haydon	6	1	6
(United States) M Varner	3	6	2
(Spain) P Barril	1	7	3
(South Africa) J Forbes	6	5	6
(United Kingdom) P Ward	6	7
(United Kingdom) T Lister	3	5
(Italy) S Lazzarino	1	5
8	(United States) K Fageros	6	7

Third round
(United Kingdom) A Haydon	3	6	7
(South Africa) J Forbes	6	2	5
(United Kingdom) P Ward	2	6	6
8	(United States) K Fageros	6	4	4

Fourth round
(United Kingdom) A Haydon	1	6	6
(United Kingdom) P Ward	6	3	1

==== Section 6 ====
First round
(United Kingdom) Viola White	6	2	6
(Australia) Margaret Carter	3	6	4
(Australia) Thelma Long	6	5	6
(United Kingdom) Anne Shilcock	1	7	2
(New Zealand) Ruia Morrison	11	6
(United States) Louise Snow	9	3
(United States) Isabel Troccole	1	7
(United Kingdom) Sheila Armstrong	6	9
(France) Maud Galtier
(Norway) Ida Wrede-Holm	w/o
Q	(United Kingdom) Pauline Drew	3	2
(United Kingdom) Joan Curry	6	6
Q	(United Kingdom) Jane Rushton	4	6
(South Africa) Renée Schuurman	6	8
(United Kingdom) Hazel Cheadle	1	2
4	(Brazil) Maria Bueno	6	6

Second round
(United Kingdom) V White	3	2
(Australia) T Long	6	6
(New Zealand) R Morrison	2	6	6
(United Kingdom) S Armstrong	6	3	3
(France) M Galtier	4	2
(United Kingdom) J Curry	6	6
(South Africa) R Schuurman	0	2
4	(Brazil) M Bueno	6	6

Third round
(Australia) T Long	6	6
(New Zealand) R Morrison	4	3
(United Kingdom) J Curry	0	2
4	(Brazil) M Bueno	6	6

Fourth round
(Australia) T Long	2	3
4	(Brazil) M Bueno	6	6

==== Section 7 ====
First round

Second round
(Switzerland) Ruth Kaufmann	5	8	6
(United Kingdom) Deidre Catt	7	6	2
(Netherlands) Fredy Marinkelle	1	7
(South Africa) Bernice Carr	6	9
(West Germany) Margot Dittmeyer	6	8
Q	(United Kingdom) Jenny Wagstaff	4	6
(Spain) Alicia Guri	1	2
5	(United Kingdom) Shirley Bloomer	6	6

Third round
(Switzerland) R Kaufmann	4	4
(South Africa) B Carr	6	6
(West Germany) M Dittmeyer	1	2
5	(United Kingdom) S Bloomer	6	6

Fourth round
(South Africa) B Carr	3	4
5	(United Kingdom) S Bloomer	6	6

==== Section 8 ====
First round

Second round
(France) Paule Courteix	6	6	6
(Austria) Elizabeth Broz	8	3	2
(United States) Geraldine Carter	0	3
(Australia) Lorraine Coghlan	6	6
(United Kingdom) Jenny Trewby	0	2
(Mexico) Yola Ramírez	6	6
(Australia) Margaret Hellyer	0	2
1	(United States) Althea Gibson	6	6

Third round
(France) P Courteix	0	3
(Australia) L Coghlan	6	6
(Mexico) Y Ramírez	7	2
1	(United States) A Gibson	9	6

Fourth round
(Australia) L Coghlan	0	2
1	(United States) A Gibson	6	6

Preceded by 1958 French Championships – Women's singles	Grand Slam women's singles	Succeeded by 1958 U.S. National Championships – Women's singles
