= 1958 Wimbledon Championships – Girls' singles =

Girls' singles
- 1958 Wimbledon Championships

Final
- Champion: (United States) Sally Moore
- Runner-up: (Soviet Union) Anna Dmitrieva
- Score: 6–2, 6–4

Details
- Draw: 13

Events
| Singles | men | women | | boys | girls |
| Doubles | men | women | mixed | boys | girls |
- Wimbledon Championships

Sally Moore defeated Anna Dmitrieva in the final, 6–2, 6–4 to win the girls' singles tennis title at the 1958 Wimbledon Championships.

== Draw ==
Key

- Q = Qualifier
- WC = Wild card
- LL = Lucky loser
- Alt = Alternate
- ITF = ITF entry
- PR = Protected ranking
- SR = Special ranking
- SE = Special exempt
- JE = Junior exempt
- JR = Junior Accelerator Programme entrant
- CO = College Accelerator Programme entrant
- NG = Next Gen Accelerator Program entrant
- w/o = Walkover
- r = Retired
- d = Defaulted

=== Draw ===
First round
(Sweden) A Johansson | 6 | 6
(Socialist Federal Republic of Yugoslavia) M Djukić | 4 | 3
(Denmark) Pia Balling | 4 | 10 | 6
(France) Solange Galtier | 6 | 8 | 0
(Switzerland) H Reimann | 3 | 2
(Austria) Edda Herdy | 6 | 6
(Netherlands) H Ruinen | 6 | 4
(Soviet Union) Anna Dmitrieva | 8 | 6
(Republic of Ireland) Eleanor O'Neill | 6 | 1 | 6
(West Germany) Marilen Knobling | 4 | 6 | 2

Quarterfinals
(United States) Sally Moore | 6 | 6
(Sweden) A Johansson | 0 | 2
(Denmark) Pia Balling | 6 | 6
(Austria) Edda Herdy | 2 | 0
(Soviet Union) Anna Dmitrieva | 6 | 6
(Republic of Ireland) Eleanor O'Neill | 2 | 4
(Norway) Liv Christiansen | 1 | 1
(United Kingdom) Jenny Trewby | 6 | 6

Semifinals
(United States) Sally Moore | 6 | 7
(Denmark) Pia Balling | 0 | 5
(Soviet Union) Anna Dmitrieva | 4 | 8 | 6
(United Kingdom) Jenny Trewby | 6 | 6 | 2

Final
(United States) Sally Moore | 6 | 6
(Soviet Union) Anna Dmitrieva | 2 | 4
