= 1957 U.S. National Championships – Women's singles =

Women's singles
- 1957 U.S. National Championships

Final
- Champion: (United States) Althea Gibson
- Runner-up: (United States) Louise Brough
- Score: 6–3, 6–2

Details
- Seeds: 8

Events
Singles	men	women
Doubles	men	women
- U.S. National Championships

Althea Gibson defeated Louise Brough in the final, 6–3, 6–2 to win the women's singles tennis title at the 1957 U.S. National Championships. Gibson did not lose a set during the tournament.

== Seeds ==
The seeded players are listed below. Althea Gibson is the champion; others show in brackets the round in which they were eliminated.

1. (United States) Althea Gibson (champion)
2. (United States) Louise Brough (finalist)
3. (United States) Dorothy Knode (semifinals)
4. (United Kingdom) Shirley Bloomer (quarterfinals)
5. (United States) Darlene Hard (semifinals)
6. (United Kingdom) Christine Truman (third round)
7. (United Kingdom) Ann Haydon (quarterfinals)
8. (Australia) Mary Hawton (quarterfinals)

== Draw ==
=== Key ===
- Q = Qualifier
- WC = Wild card
- LL = Lucky loser
- r = Retired

=== Final eight ===
Quarterfinals
1	(United States) Althea Gibson	6	6
8	(Australia) Mary Hawton	2	2
3	(United States) Dorothy Knode	6	6
(United States) Lois Felix	2	1
2	(United States) Louise Brough	7	6
7	(United Kingdom) Ann Haydon	5	2
4	(United Kingdom) Shirley Bloomer	0	1
5	(United States) Darlene Hard	6	6

Semifinals
1	(United States) Althea Gibson	6	6
3	(United States) Dorothy Knode	2	2
2	(United States) Louise Brough	6	6
5	(United States) Darlene Hard	1	4

Finals
1	(United States) Althea Gibson	6	6
2	(United States) Louise Brough	3	2

Preceded by 1956 Wimbledon Championships – Women's singles	Grand Slam women's singles	Succeeded by 1957 Australian Championships – Women's singles
