= 1958 Wimbledon Championships – Men's singles =

Men's singles
- 1958 Wimbledon Championships

Final
- Champion: (Australia) Ashley Cooper
- Runner-up: (Australia) Neale Fraser
- Score: 3–6, 6–3, 6–4, 13–11

Details
- Draw: 128 (10Q)
- Seeds: 8

Events
Singles	men	women		boys	girls
Doubles	men	women	mixed	boys	girls
← 1957 ·	Wimbledon Championships	· 1959 →

Ashley Cooper defeated Neale Fraser in the final, 3–6, 6–3, 6–4, 13–11 to win the gentlemen's singles tennis title at the 1958 Wimbledon Championships. Cooper had to play 332 games to win the title, the most of any male champion in the history of the tournament. Lew Hoad was the defending champion, but was ineligible to compete after turning professional.

== Seeds ==
1. (Australia) Ashley Cooper (champion)
2. (Australia) Mal Anderson (quarterfinals)
3. (Australia) Mervyn Rose (semifinals)
4. (Australia) Neale Fraser (final)
5. (Chile) Luis Ayala (third round)
6. (Denmark) Kurt Nielsen (semifinals)
7. (Sweden) Sven Davidson (quarterfinals)
8. (United States) Barry MacKay (quarterfinals)

Click on the seed number of a player to go to their draw section.

== Draw ==
Key

- Q = Qualifier
- WC = Wild card
- LL = Lucky loser
- Alt = Alternate
- ITF = ITF entry
- PR = Protected ranking
- SR = Special ranking
- SE = Special exempt
- JE = Junior exempt
- JR = Junior Accelerator Programme entrant
- CO = College Accelerator Programme entrant
- NG = Next Gen Accelerator Program entrant
- w/o = Walkover
- r = Retired
- d = Defaulted

=== Finals ===
Quarterfinals
2	(Australia) Mal Anderson	2	3	3
6	(Denmark) Kurt Nielsen	6	6	6
4	(Australia) Neale Fraser	6	6	6	3	8
7	(Sweden) Sven Davidson	4	8	2	6	6
8	(United States) Barry MacKay	2	4	4
3	(Australia) Mervyn Rose	6	6	6
(United Kingdom) Bobby Wilson	4	2	6	6	5
1	(Australia) Ashley Cooper	6	6	3	4	7

Semifinals
6	(Denmark) Kurt Nielsen	4	4	19	4
4	(Australia) Neale Fraser	6	6	17	6
3	(Australia) Mervyn Rose	9	2	2	3
1	(Australia) Ashley Cooper	7	6	6	6

Final
4	(Australia) Neale Fraser	6	3	4	11
1	(Australia) Ashley Cooper	3	6	6	13

=== Top half ===
==== Section 1 ====
First round
2	(Australia) Mal Anderson	6	6	7
(India) Premjit Lall	4	4	5
(United Kingdom) Howard Walton	4	3	3
(Spain) Andrés Gimeno	6	6	6
(United Kingdom) John Barrett	6	7	6
(United Kingdom) Bob Hull	1	5	2
(Australia) Paul Hearnden	6	6	6	6
(United States) Gene Scott	8	0	2	4
(Switzerland) Erwin Balestra	0	2	2
(Australia) Rod Laver	6	6	6
(United States) Nick Carter	6	4	6	6
(United Kingdom) Reg Bennett	3	6	4	0
(Poland) Andrzej Licis	3	6	6	3	6
(United Kingdom) Jimmy Tattersall	6	2	3	6	2
(France) Robert Haillet	6	3	6	3	2
(United Arab Republic) Jaroslav Drobný	2	6	3	6	6

Second round
2	(Australia) M Anderson	6	6	6
(Spain) A Gimeno	4	4	4
(United Kingdom) J Barrett	6	6	5	6
(Australia) P Hearnden	3	1	7	3
(Australia) R Laver	4	6	12	6
(United States) C Carter	6	3	10	4
(Poland) A Licis	4	6	4
(United Arab Republic) J Drobný	6	8	6

Third round
2	(Australia) M Anderson	3	6	6	6
(United Kingdom) J Barrett	6	0	2	3
(Australia) R Laver	1	1	4
(United Arab Republic) J Drobný	6	6	6

Fourth round
2	(Australia) M Anderson	6	10	6
(United Arab Republic) J Drobný	3	8	2

==== Section 2 ====
First round
6	(Denmark) Kurt Nielsen	6	6	6
(Netherlands) Hans van de Weg	2	4	0
(United Kingdom) Geoff Ward	6	6	6
(Chile) Patricio Rodríguez	4	3	4
(United Kingdom) David Gunson	6	13	2	3
(Socialist Federal Republic of Yugoslavia) Ika Panajotovic	4	15	6	6
(India) Akhtar Ali	6	8	6
(United Kingdom) Tony Clayton	1	6	4
(Belgium) Jacques Brichant	6	7	6
(Uruguay) Eduardo Argon	2	5	3
(United Kingdom) Mike Davies	6	4	6	6
(Mexico) Antonio Palafox	2	6	2	2
(South Africa) Bertie Gaertner	2	8	6	8
(Italy) Orlando Sirola	6	10	3	10
(Sweden) Ulf Schmidt	1	6	6	6
(United States) Gilbert Shea	6	4	2	4

Second round
6	(Denmark) K Nielsen	6	6	6	8	6
(United Kingdom) G Ward	8	4	4	10	2
(Socialist Federal Republic of Yugoslavia) I Panajotovic	8	4	6	6	7
(India) A Ali	6	6	8	3	5
(Belgium) J Brichant	6	8	2	5	6
(United Kingdom) M Davies	3	6	6	7	1
(Italy) O Sirola	9	3	6	6	5
(Sweden) U Schmidt	11	6	1	2	7

Third round
6	(Denmark) K Nielsen	6	6	6
(Socialist Federal Republic of Yugoslavia) I Panajotovic	1	4	2
(Belgium) J Brichant	6	3	5	6	5
(Sweden) U Schmidt	3	6	7	4	7

Fourth round
6	(Denmark) K Nielsen	6	15	6
(Sweden) U Schmidt	4	13	4

==== Section 3 ====
First round
4	(Australia) Neale Fraser	6	6	6
(Socialist Federal Republic of Yugoslavia) Vladimir Petrović	3	1	0
(Austria) Franz Hainka	2	2	1
(China) Mei Fu Chi	6	6	6
(United Kingdom) John Ward	5	4	4
(West Germany) Peter Scholl	7	6	6
Q	(United Kingdom) Eddie Ford	6	3	4	7	5
(Italy) Antonio Maggi	1	6	6	5	7
(Australia) Don Candy	7	5	13	6	12
(United Kingdom) Billy Knight	5	7	15	3	10
(United States) Malcolm Fox	2	11	6	6
Q	(United States) Wayne Van Voorhees	6	9	0	1
(Chile) Ernesto Aguirre	1	1	4
(France) Pierre Darmon	6	6	6
(Cuba) Reynaldo Garrido	6	7	2	6
(United Kingdom) Norman Kitovitz	3	5	6	4

Second round
4	(Australia) N Fraser	6	6	6
(China) FC Mei	1	1	1
(West Germany) P Scholl	2	4	2
(Italy) A Maggi	6	6	6
(Australia) D Candy	6	10	6
(United States) M Fox	4	8	4
(France) P Darmon	3	6	6	6
(Cuba) R Garrido	6	2	1	2

Third round
4	(Australia) N Fraser	6	6	6
(Italy) A Maggi	0	4	3
(Australia) D Candy	w/o
(France) P Darmon

Fourth round
4	(Australia) N Fraser	6	6	6
(France) P Darmon	4	3	3

==== Section 4 ====
First round
7	(Sweden) Sven Davidson	6	7	6
(France) Jean-Noël Grinda	1	5	3
Q	(Federation of Rhodesia and Nyasaland) Roy Stilwell	3	0	3
(Mexico) Francisco Contreras	6	6	6
(Australia) Graeme Stewart	5	4	2
(Venezuela) Isaías Pimentel	7	6	6
(Brazil) Ivo Ribeiro	1	8	2
(India) Naresh Kumar	6	10	6
(United States) Bob Perry	6	6	3	8
(New Zealand) Lew Gerrard	4	1	6	6
(United States) Budge Patty	6	6	6
(Australia) Allan Kendall	3	3	4
(Australia) Warren Woodcock	3	6	11	6	8
(United Kingdom) Tony Pickard	6	2	13	1	6
(Denmark) Torben Ulrich	6	6	6
(Spain) Alberto Arilla	1	1	2

Second round
7	(Sweden) S Davidson	6	10	8
(Mexico) F Contreras	2	8	6
(Venezuela) I Pimentel	7	8	10	6
Q	(India) N Kumar	9	6	8	3
(United States) R Perry	4	3	6	6	4
(United States) J Patty	6	6	3	4	6
(Australia) W Woodcock	4	1	2
(Denmark) T Ulrich	6	6	6

Third round
7	(Sweden) S Davidson	6	3	6	6
(Venezuela) I Pimentel	3	6	1	4
(United States) J Patty	4	7	6	6
(Denmark) T Ulrich	6	5	1	2

Fourth round
7	(Sweden) S Davidson	6	2	4	9	6
(United States) J Patty	4	6	6	7	4

=== Bottom half ===
==== Section 5 ====
First round
(Mexico) Mario Llamas	6	7	2
(United Kingdom) Ivor Warwick	8	9	6
(United States) John Cranston	3	4	6	3
(India) Ramanathan Krishnan	6	6	1	6
(France) Jean-Claude Molinari	8	6	6
(Cuba) Orlando Garrido	6	3	2
(Australia) Peter Newman	2	2	1
(United Kingdom) Roger Becker	6	6	6
(United Kingdom) Derek Collins	1	1	2
(Australia) Bob Mark	6	6	6
(United Kingdom) Mike Sangster	4	4	6	6
Q	(United States) Greg Grant	6	6	4	8
(Hungary) István Gulyás	w/o
(United Kingdom) Eric Bulmer
(Spain) Emilio Martínez	6	2	2	1
8	(United States) Barry MacKay	4	6	6	6

Second round
(United Kingdom) I Warwick	1	12	0
(India) R Krishnan	6	14	6
(France) J-C Molinari	6	6	6
(United Kingdom) R Becker	3	3	4
(Australia) R Mark	15	0	8	6
Q	(United States) G Grant	13	6	6	2
(United Kingdom) E Bulmer	1	7	2
8	(United States) B MacKay	6	9	6

Third round
(India) R Krishnan	8	6	6
(France) J-C Molinari	6	1	0
(Australia) R Mark	6	8	4	4
8	(United States) B MacKay	4	10	6	6

Fourth round
(India) R Krishnan	3	9	2
8	(United States) B MacKay	6	11	6

==== Section 6 ====
First round
(Denmark) Søren Højberg	1	2	6	1
Q	(Australia) Barry Kearney	6	6	3	6
(United States) Mike Green	4	6	3	6	6
(Italy) Alberto Lazzarino	6	2	6	1	2
(United States) Gardnar Mulloy	6	6	4	6
(Chile) Andrés Hammersley	2	2	6	3
(South Africa) John Hurry	6	6	6
(United Kingdom) Colin Baxter	1	2	3
(United Kingdom) Gerry Oakley	6	6	4	2	6
(Brazil) Ronnie Barnes	3	3	6	6	8
Q	(United Kingdom) Oliver Prenn	6	6	9
(Republic of Ireland) Joe Hackett	4	2	7
(United States) Jack Frost	7	8	6
(Australia) Pat O'Kane	5	6	2
(Poland) Władysław Skonecki	3	4	1
3	(Australia) Mervyn Rose	6	6	6

Second round
Q	(Australia) B Kearney	5	1	4
(United States) M Green	7	6	6
(United States) G Mulloy	6	6	6
(South Africa) J Hurry	2	4	3
(Brazil) R Barnes	7	9	2	6
Q	(United Kingdom) O Prenn	5	7	6	4
(United States) J Frost	4	8	4
3	(Australia) M Rose	6	10	6

Third round
(United States) M Green	6	4	4	2
(United States) G Mulloy	3	6	6	6
(Brazil) R Barnes	3	7	4
3	(Australia) M Rose	6	9	6

Fourth round
(United States) G Mulloy	2	3	1
3	(Australia) M Rose	6	6	6

==== Section 7 ====
First round
(Netherlands) Pieter van Eijsden	5	5	2
(Australia) Wayne Reid	7	7	6
(United Kingdom) Bobby Wilson	6	6	6
(West Germany) Wilhelm Bungert	0	3	2
(New Zealand) Peter Nicholls	3	4	2
(United States) William Quillian	6	6	6
(United Kingdom) Michael Hann	6	6	5	6
Q	(United Kingdom) Bob Dabbs	3	1	7	3
(Hungary) István Sikorszki	4	6	1	4
(United Kingdom) Geoffrey Paish	6	3	6	6
(Hungary) Antal Jancsó	8	4	8
(Italy) Nicola Pietrangeli	10	6	10
Q	(United States) Butch Buchholz	6	6	6
(Brazil) Carlos Fernandes	4	4	3
(Socialist Federal Republic of Yugoslavia) Kamilo Keretić	3	1	3
5	(Chile) Luis Ayala	6	6	6

Second round
(Australia) W Reid	5	0	5
(United Kingdom) R Wilson	7	6	7
(United States) W Quillian	9	6	3	4
(United Kingdom) M Hann	11	1	6	6
(United Kingdom) G Paish	2	0	6	6	3
(Italy) N Pietrangeli	6	6	4	4	6
Q	(United States) E Buchholz	4	6	6
5	(Chile) L Ayala	6	8	8

Third round
(United Kingdom) R Wilson	8	6	6
(United Kingdom) M Hann	6	4	0
(Italy) N Pietrangeli	6	6	6
5	(Chile) L Ayala	4	4	3

Fourth round
(United Kingdom) R Wilson	11	6	6
(Italy) N Pietrangeli	9	2	2

==== Section 8 ====
First round
(France) Paul Rémy	6	3	6	2	5
(United Kingdom) Alan Mills	4	6	1	6	7
(Australia) Warren Jacques	8	6	6
(India) Narendra Nath	6	4	4
(Colombia) William Álvarez	6	10	6
(Spain) Manuel Santana	3	8	3
(Sweden) Jan-Erik Lundqvist	6	6	3	2	3
(South Africa) Abe Segal	3	3	6	6	6
(Australia) Tim Cawthorn	2	1	2
(Australia) Bob Howe	6	6	6
Q	(United Kingdom) Peter Wooller	6	1	6	5
(Denmark) Jørgen Ulrich	8	6	4	7
(Austria) Franz Saiko	6	6	6
Q	(India) Arcot Udaykumar	3	4	2
(United Kingdom) Geoffrey Owen	8	6	4	1
1	(Australia) Ashley Cooper	10	3	6	6

Second round
(United Kingdom) A Mills	10	5	9	4	1
(Australia) W Jacques	8	7	7	6	6
(Colombia) W Álvarez	4	1	2
(South Africa) A Segal	6	6	6
(Australia) R Howe	2	6	5	6
(Denmark) J Ulrich	6	4	7	8
(Austria) F Saiko	3	4	1
1	(Australia) A Cooper	6	6	6

Third round
(Australia) W Jacques	3	1	4
(South Africa) A Segal	6	6	6
(Denmark) J Ulrich	7	2	6	3
1	(Australia) A Cooper	9	6	3	6

Fourth round
(South Africa) A Segal	11	3	6	12
1	(Australia) A Cooper	13	6	3	14

Preceded by 1958 French Championships	Grand Slams; Men's Singles	Succeeded by 1958 U.S. Championships
