= Ika Panajotovic =

Ilija Panajotovic
- Country (sports): (Socialist Federal Republic of Yugoslavia) Yugoslavia
- Born: 25 April 1932 Belgrade, Kingdom of Yugoslavia
- Died: 18 July 2001 (aged 69) Los Angeles, United States

Grand Slam singles results
- French Open: 2R (1954)
- Wimbledon: 3R (1958)

Grand Slam doubles results
- Wimbledon: QF (1958)

Ilija "Ika" Panajotovic (Serbian: Илија Панајотовић, Ilija Panajotović; 25 April 1932 – 18 July 2001) was a Serbian-American film producer and tennis player.

== Tennis career ==
Panajotovic, who made the junior semi-finals at Wimbledon in 1948, won back to back Yugoslavian Junior Championship titles in 1948 and 1949.

The Serbian competed in 12 Grand Slam tournaments during his career, all in the 1950s. He appeared at Wimbledon seven times and played in the French Championships on five occasions. From 1953 to 1959, Panajotovic participated in Wimbledon every year and made the third round in the 1958 Championships. He had a five set win over Akhtar Ali in the second round, before exiting to tournament with a loss to sixth seed Kurt Nielsen. In the men's doubles he also had success, with Panajotovic and his partner Ivko Plećević reaching the quarter-finals.

Panajotovic was the Yugoslavian national champion in 1958 and 1959.

In Davis Cup tennis, Panajotovic took part in 11 ties, from 1953 to 1960. One of his three singles wins was over Denmark's Kurt Nielsen, in 1960. He also won two doubles rubbers, one partnering Ivko Plećević, against Egypt, the other with Boro Jovanović as his partner, against Denmark.

An injury, sustained in a car accident, ended his tennis career.

== Education and early work ==
In 1957, Panajotovic graduated from the University of Belgrade's Law School and has worked in Belgrade as an attorney over the next five years. During this time he also found work as a newspaper journalist. He then moved to Los Angeles and earned a BA in political science from UCLA.

== Film career ==
Panajotovic was the producer of several films, including Day of the Assassin, Hell River, and Missile X: The Neutron Bomb Incident. He also served as the Yugoslavian coordinator for the Kirk Douglas film Scalawag, which was shot in his native country.

He was a member of the Academy of Motion Pictures Arts and Sciences, Hollywood Foreign Press Association and Motion Picture Academy.

== Death ==
On 18 July 2001, Panajotovic died of a cardiac arrest, during surgery.

== Filmography ==
Year	Title	Role
1967	(Socialist Federal Republic of Yugoslavia) Bomba u 10 i 10 (Bomb at 10:10)	Producer
1968	Operation Cross Eagles	Producer
1974	(Socialist Federal Republic of Yugoslavia) Partizani (Hell River)	Producer
1978	Missile X: The Neutron Bomb Incident	Producer
1979	Day of the Assassin	Producer
1986	(Socialist Federal Republic of Yugoslavia) Dikiy veter (Wild Wind)	Producer
