= Missile X: The Neutron Bomb Incident =

Missile X - Geheimauftrag Neutronenbombe
- US poster with the alternate title The Tehran Incident
- Directed by: Leslie H. Martinson
- Written by: Cesare Canevari (screenplay); Santiago Moncada (screenplay); Ted V. Mikels (adaptation)
- Produced by: Ika Panajotovic
- Starring: Peter Graves; Curd Jürgens; Michael Dante; John Carradine
- Cinematography: Claudio Catozzo
- Edited by: Antonio Jimeno
- Music by: Alberto Baldan
- Production companies: Eichberg-Film; Cine Lu.Ce.; Mundail Film
- Distributed by: VCL Communications
- Release dates: 26 February 1979 (Berlin); 21 December 1979 (United States)
- Running time: 97 minutes
- Countries: West Germany; Italy; Spain
- Languages: English; Russian

Missile X – Geheimauftrag Neutronenbombe (English: Missile X: The Neutron Bomb Incident; also known in the United States as The Tehran Incident) is a 1979 Eurospy adventure film directed by Leslie H. Martinson, and starring Peter Graves and Curd Jürgens. An international co-production between West Germany, Italy and Spain, much of filming took place on location in and around Tehran, Iran, in 1978 before the Iranian Revolution overthrew Iran's Shah.

== Plot ==
The story concerns an experimental nuclear cruise missile that is stolen from a Soviet military site in the USSR. An international terrorist group, under the command of a European power-crazed man known only as the Baron, is responsible. The Baron plans to use the stolen Soviet missile to destroy an international peace conference on an island in the Persian Gulf within a week. When the Baron's henchmen murder the U.S. consul to Iran, Alec Franklin, a US intelligence agent, is ordered to travel to Iran to take over as consul as well as investigate the murder. Upon arrival in Tehran, Alec is followed by two of the Baron's henchmen who attempt to kill him, but Alec manages to escape.

Alec then travels from Tehran to Abadan, where he meets Konstantin, a Soviet KGB intelligence agent who is in Iran searching for leads to locate the missing cruise missile, which leads to Alec and Konstantin joining forces, along with Galina, another Soviet agent, and Leila, an undercover Iranian policewoman, to investigate the Baron and find the location where the cruise missile is being kept before it is used to start World War III.

== Cast ==
- Peter Graves as Alec Franklin
- Curd Jürgens as The Baron
- Karin Schubert as Galina Fedorovna
- Michael Dante as Konstanine Senyonov
- Carmen Cervera as Nina
- Pouri Baneai as Leila
- Robert Avard Miller as Stetson
- Michael Tietz as Tony
- Mel Novak as Mendosa
- John Carradine as Professor Nikolaeff
- Aldo Sambrell as George
- Frank Braña as Rigo

== Commentary track ==
On June 2, 2017, RiffTrax released as a VOD an edited 84-minute version of the film with a comedic commentary track by Michael J. Nelson, Kevin Murphy, and Bill Corbett.
