= Antonio Maggi =

Italian tennis player (born 1932)

- Country (sports): Italy
- Born: 10 January 1932

Grand Slam singles results
- French Open: 3R (1954, 1958)
- Wimbledon: 3R (1958)
- US Open: 1R (1963)

Antonio Maggi (born 10 January 1932) is an Italian former tennis player active in the 1950s and 1960s.

Maggi, a native of Milan, was a singles finalist at Cannes and the Riviera Championships. In 1957 he debuted for the Italy Davis Cup team in the Europe Zone quarter-finals against Poland, winning a singles rubber over Władysław Skonecki. He twice reached the singles third round of the French Championships, including in 1958 as one of four Italians to make the final 32. In 1958 he also had his best Wimbledon run, which ended in a third round loss to fourth-seed Neale Fraser.

== See also ==
- List of Italy Davis Cup team representatives
