= 1958 Wimbledon Championships =

- Date: 23 June – 5 July 1958
- Edition: 72nd
- Category: Grand Slam
- Surface: Grass
- Location: Church Road; SW19, Wimbledon, London, United Kingdom
- Venue: All England Lawn Tennis and Croquet Club
- Attendance: 271,019

Champions

Men's singles
- (Australia) Ashley Cooper

Women's singles
- (United States) Althea Gibson

Men's doubles
- (Sweden) Sven Davidson / (Sweden) Ulf Schmidt

Women's doubles
- (Brazil) Maria Bueno / (United States) Althea Gibson

Mixed doubles
- (Australia) Robert Howe / (Australia) Lorraine Coghlan

Boys' singles
- (United States) Butch Buchholz

Girls' singles
- (United States) Sally Moore
← 1957 ·	Wimbledon Championships	· 1959 →

The 1958 Wimbledon Championships took place on the outdoor grass courts at the All England Lawn Tennis and Croquet Club in Wimbledon, London, United Kingdom. The tournament was held from Monday 23 June until Saturday 5 July 1958. It was the 72nd staging of the Wimbledon Championships, and the third Grand Slam tennis event of 1958. Ashley Cooper and Althea Gibson won the singles titles.

== Champions ==
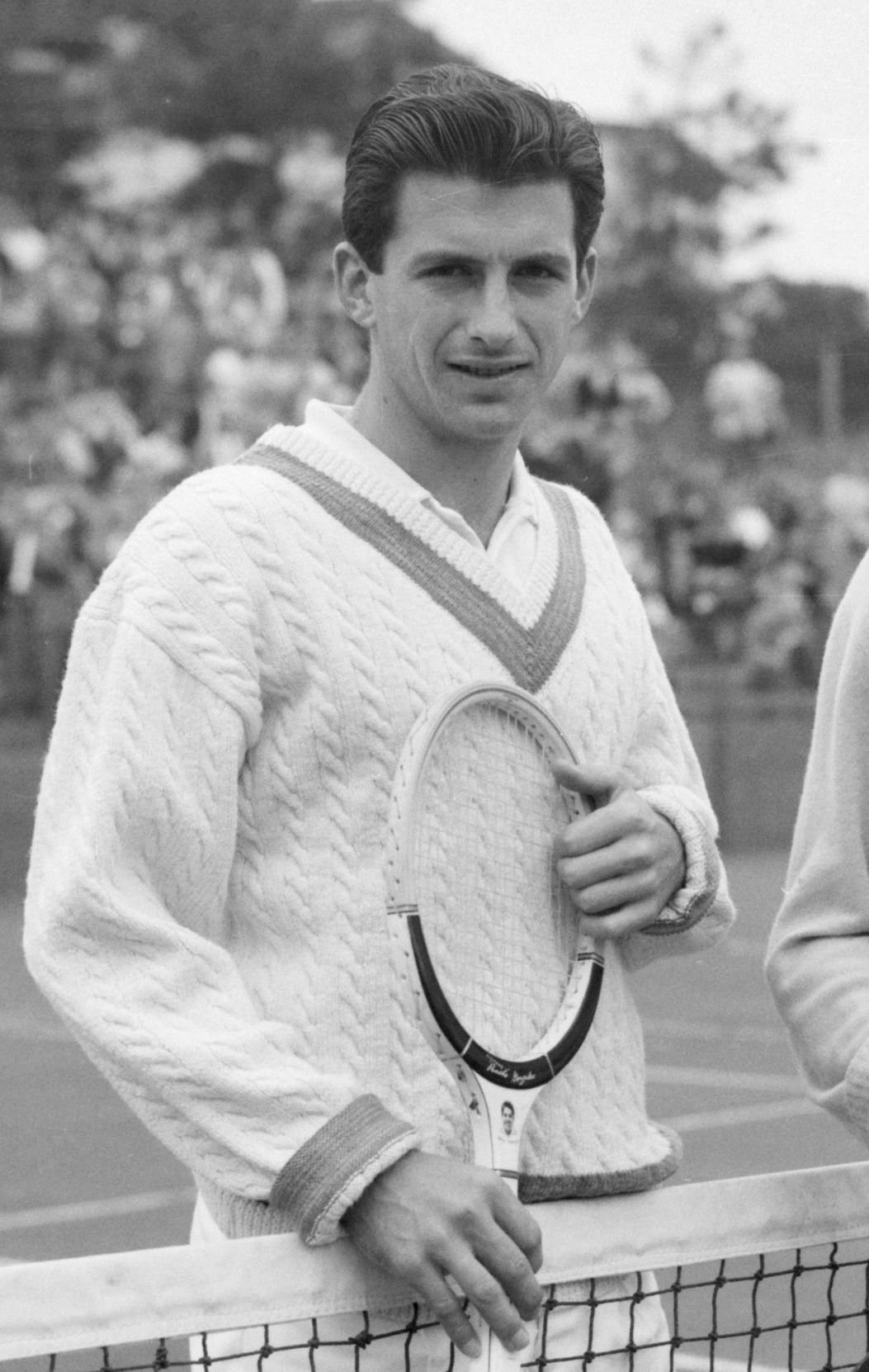
Ashley Cooper, Men's Singles Champion (1958)

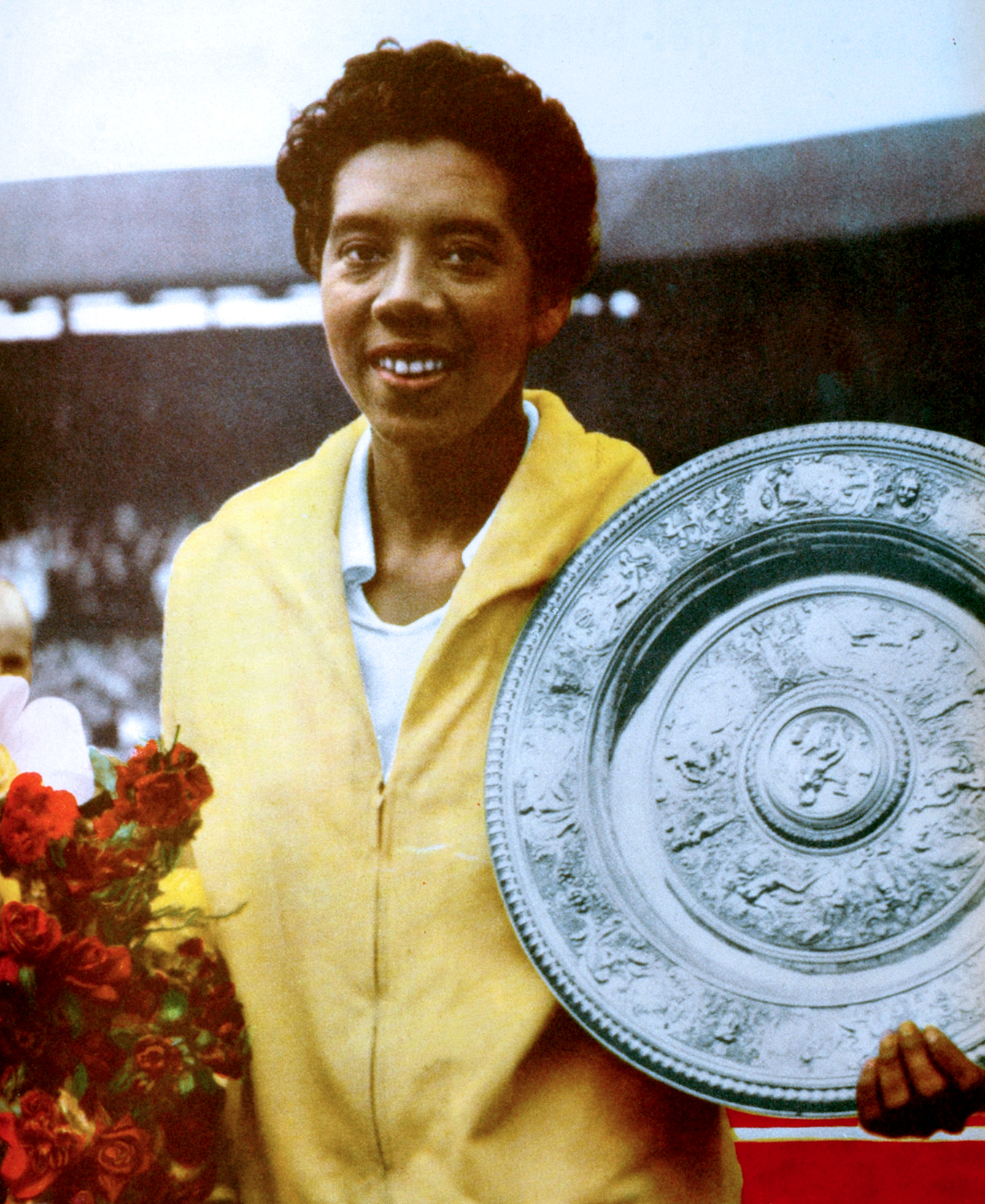
Althea Gibson, Women's Singles Champion (1958)

=== Seniors ===
==== Men's singles ====
(Australia) Ashley Cooper defeated (Australia) Neale Fraser, 3–6, 6–3, 6–4, 13–11

==== Women's singles ====
(United States) Althea Gibson defeated (United Kingdom) Angela Mortimer, 8–6, 6–2

==== Men's doubles ====
(Sweden) Sven Davidson / (Sweden) Ulf Schmidt defeated (Australia) Ashley Cooper / (Australia) Neale Fraser, 6–4, 6–4, 8–6

==== Women's doubles ====
(Brazil) Maria Bueno / (United States) Althea Gibson defeated (United States) Margaret duPont / (United States) Margaret Varner, 6–3, 7–5

==== Mixed doubles ====
(Australia) Robert Howe / (Australia) Lorraine Coghlan defeated (Denmark) Kurt Nielsen / (United States) Althea Gibson, 6–3, 13–11

=== Juniors ===
==== Boys' singles ====
(United States) Butch Buchholz defeated (India) Premjit Lall, 6–1, 6–3

==== Girls' singles ====
(United States) Sally Moore defeated (Soviet Union) Anna Dmitrieva, 6–2, 6–4

Preceded by 1958 French Championships	Grand Slams	Succeeded by 1958 U.S. National Championships
