= Jimmy Tattersall =

British tennis player (1940–1997)

- Full name: James Irvine Tattersall
- Country (sports): United Kingdom
- Born: 27 March 1940 Gloucester, England
- Died: 11 February 1997 (aged 56) Evesham, England
- Turned pro: 1955 (amateur tour)
- Retired: 1962
- Plays: Right-handed

Singles

Grand Slam singles results
- Wimbledon: 1R (1957, 1958, 1959, 1962)
- US Open: 1R (1960)

Doubles

Grand Slam doubles results
- Wimbledon: 2R (1958, 1959)

Mixed doubles

Grand Slam mixed doubles results
- Wimbledon: 3R (1958)

James Irvine Tattersall (27 March 1940 – 4 February 1997) was a British professional tennis player who became active from mid-1950s to early-1960s.

== Career ==
Tattersall defeated Ivo Ribeiro of Brazil in the boys' singles final at the Wimbledon Championships in 1957 in straight sets. He also won the boys' doubles and became the youngest British No. 1 in junior tennis. In the same year, he was a member of the Duffield Lawn Tennis Club first tennis team. During the previous year, 1956 and as a 16 year–old, Tattersall also won the boys' doubles as well as the junior mixed doubles titles at Wimbledon.

Apart from Wimbledon, Tattersall also participated at the 1960 U.S. National Championships, where he was defeated by Roy Emerson in the first round in straight sets. In 1961, he participated at the U.S. Clay Court Championships and after he defeated Andy Paton, Jr. in the first round, he was defeated by the eventual champion, Barry MacKay in the second round. Tattersall announced his retirement from tennis in 1962.

== Death ==
He died on 11 February 1997, aged 56 at his home in Evesham, Worcestershire where he lived for the latter part of his life.

== Junior Grand Slam finals ==
=== Singles: 1 ===
Result	Year	Championship	Surface	Opponent	Score
Win	1957	Wimbledon	Grass	(Brazil) Ivo Ribeiro	6–2, 6–1
