= Shirley Brasher =

English tennis player

- Full name: Shirley Juliet Bloomer
- Country (sports): Great Britain
- Born: 13 June 1934 (age 92) Grimsby, England

Singles
- Highest ranking: No. 3 (1957) ^{(Tingay)}

Grand Slam singles results
- French Open: W (1957)
- Wimbledon: QF (1956, 1958)
- US Open: SF (1956)

Grand Slam doubles results
- French Open: W (1957)
- Wimbledon: F (1955)

Grand Slam mixed doubles results
- French Open: W (1958)

Team competitions
- Wightman Cup: W (1958, 1960)

Shirley Brasher (née Bloomer; born 13 June 1934) is a former tennis player from England who won three Grand Slam titles during her career and who was the top-ranked singles player in her country in 1957.

== Early life ==
Brasher attended Cleethorpes Girls' Grammar School (became Lindsey School in 1973) in Cleethorpes.

== Career ==
Brasher (then known as Shirley Bloomer) won the singles title at the 1957 French Championships, defeating Dorothy Head Knode in the final in straight sets. She was the runner-up in singles at the 1958 French Championships, losing to Zsuzsi Körmöczy 6–4, 1–6, 6–2, having defeated Maria Bueno in the semifinals.

Bloomer teamed with Darlene Hard to win the women's doubles title at the 1957 French Championships, defeating Yola Ramírez and Rosie Reyes in the final 7–5, 4–6, 7–5. She teamed with Nicola Pietrangeli to win the mixed doubles title at the 1958 French Championships, defeating Lorraine Coghlan and Robert Howe in the final.

Bloomer partnered Patricia Ward to reach the 1955 women's doubles finals at Wimbledon, where they lost to Angela Mortimer and Anne Shilcock 7–5, 6–1, and at the French Championships, where they lost to Hard and Beverly Baker Fleitz 7–5, 6–8, 13–11. They previously had beaten Mortimer and Shilcock in the British Hard Courts final and defeated Hard and Fleitz in the Wimbledon semifinals.

She reached the final of Monte Carlo in 1956, losing to Althea Gibson and with Pat Hird beat Gibson and Louise Snow in the doubles final. Having reached the final in 1956, beating Darlene Hard and losing in three sets to Angela Mortimer, she won the British Hard Court Championships at Bournemouth in 1957, beating Pat Ward, and in 1958, beating Christine Truman and Ann Haydon. She beat Louise Brough to reach the semifinals of the U.S. Championships in 1956 and was the only player to take a set from Althea Gibson at Wimbledon in 1958, losing in three sets in the quarterfinals. According to Lance Tingay's end of year rankings, she reached no. 7 in the world in 1956, no. 3 in 1957 and no. 5 in 1958. She won the Italian Championships in 1957, beating Dorothy Knode in a three-sets final. She lost her title the next year to Maria Bueno in the semifinals after having match points.

Bloomer played on the British Wightman Cup team from 1955 through 1960, playing the no. 2 singles in 1955, the no. 3 in 1956 (beating Dorothy Knode), and the no. 1 in 1957 and 1958. The 1958 team that included Christine Truman and Brasher won the cup, which was the first time that Great Britain had won the competition since 1930. In 1960, she and Christine Truman won the final doubles match against Janet Hopps and Dorothy Knode to bring her team to another 4–3 victory over the U.S.

Bloomer played a hard baseline game, and her tennis was concerted rather than spectacular. She was a member of the Grimsby Town Tennis Club, which was located in College Street, Grimsby.

== Personal life ==
In April 1959, she married Olympic champion athlete Chris Brasher who helped pace Roger Bannister to running the first sub-four-minute mile in 1954. They had three children, including their daughter Kate who played on the women's professional tennis tour in the 1980s.

== Grand Slam finals ==
=== Singles (1 title, 1 runner-up) ===
| Result | Year | Championship | Surface | Opponent | Score |
|---|---|---|---|---|---|
| Win | 1957 | French Championships | Clay | (United States) Dorothy Head Knode | 6–1, 6–3 |
| Loss | 1958 | French Championships | Clay | (Hungary) Zsuzsi Körmöczy | 4–6, 6–1, 2–6 |

=== Doubles (1 title, 2 runner-ups) ===
| Result | Year | Championship | Surface | Partner | Opponents | Score |
|---|---|---|---|---|---|---|
| Loss | 1955 | French Championships | Clay | (United Kingdom) Pat Ward | (United States) Beverly Baker (United States) Darlene Hard | 5–7, 8–6, 11–13 |
| Loss | 1955 | Wimbledon | Grass | (United Kingdom) Pat Ward | (United Kingdom) Angela Mortimer (United Kingdom) Anne Shilcock | 5–7, 1–6 |
| Win | 1957 | French Championships | Clay | (United States) Darlene Hard | (Mexico) Yola Ramírez (Mexico) Rosie Reyes | 7–5, 4–6, 7–5 |

=== Mixed Doubles (1 title) ===
| Result | Year | Championship | Surface | Partner | Opponents | Score |
|---|---|---|---|---|---|---|
| Win | 1958 | French Championships | Clay | (Italy) Nicola Pietrangeli | (Australia) Lorraine Coghlan (Australia) Bob Howe | 8–6, 6–2 |

== Grand Slam singles tournament timeline ==
Key
| W | F | SF | QF | #R | RR | Q# | DNQ | A | NH |

(W) winner; (F) finalist; (SF) semifinalist; (QF) quarterfinalist; (#R) rounds 4, 3, 2, 1; (RR) round-robin stage; (Q#) qualification round; (DNQ) did not qualify; (A) absent; (NH) not held; (SR) strike rate (events won / competed); (W–L) win–loss record.

| Tournament | 1952 | 1953 | 1954 | 1955 | 1956 | 1957 | 1958 | 1959 | 1960 | 1961 | 1962 | 1963 | 1964 | 1965 | 1966 | 1967 | 1968 | 1969 | 1970 | 1971 | 1972 | 1973 | 1974 | Career SR |
|---|---|---|---|---|---|---|---|---|---|---|---|---|---|---|---|---|---|---|---|---|---|---|---|---|
| Australian Championships | A | A | A | A | A | A | A | A | A | A | A | A | A | A | A | A | A | A | A | A | A | A | A | 0 / 0 |
| French Championships | A | A | 3R | QF | QF | W | F | 4R | A | A | A | A | A | A | A | A | A | A | A | A | A | A | A | 1 / 6 |
| Wimbledon | 1R | 3R | A | 4R | QF | 4R | QF | 2R | 3R | 2R | A | 2R | A | A | 4R | A | 4R | 2R | 3R | 2R | 2R | 1R | 2R | 0 / 18 |
| U.S. Championships | A | A | A | 3R | SF | QF | A | 3R | A | A | A | A | A | A | A | A | A | A | A | A | A | A | A | 0 / 4 |
| SR | 0 / 1 | 0 / 1 | 0 / 1 | 0 / 3 | 0 / 3 | 1 / 3 | 0 / 2 | 0 / 3 | 0 / 1 | 0 / 1 | 0 / 0 | 0 / 1 | 0 / 0 | 0 / 0 | 0 / 1 | 0 / 0 | 0 / 1 | 0 / 1 | 0 / 1 | 0 / 1 | 0 / 1 | 0 / 1 | 0 / 1 | 1 / 28 |

== See also ==
- Performance timelines for all female tennis players since 1978 who reached at least one Grand Slam final
