= 1955 U.S. National Championships – Men's singles =

Men's singles
- 1955 U.S. National Championships

Final
- Champion: (United States) Tony Trabert
- Runner-up: (Australia) Ken Rosewall
- Score: 9–7, 6–3, 6–3

Details
- Draw: 124
- Seeds: 16

Events
Singles	men	women
Doubles	men	women
- U.S. National Championships

Tony Trabert defeated Ken Rosewall 9–7, 6–3, 6–3 in the final to win the men's singles tennis title at the 1955 U.S. National Championships.

== Seeds ==
The tournament used two lists of eight players for seeding the men's singles event; one for U.S. players and one for foreign players. Tony Trabert is the champion; others show the round in which they were eliminated.

U.S.

1. (United States) Tony Trabert (champion)
2. (United States) Vic Seixas (semifinals)
3. (United States) Ham Richardson (quarterfinals)
4. (United States) Gilbert Shea (first round)
5. (United States) Eddie Moylan (fourth round)
6. (United States) Art Larsen (fourth round)
7. (United States) Tut Bartzen (quarterfinals)
8. (United States) Herbie Flam (quarterfinals)

Foreign

1. (Australia) Ken Rosewall (finalist)
2. (Australia) Lew Hoad (semifinals)
3. (Denmark) Kurt Nielsen (third round)
4. (Australia) Rex Hartwig (fourth round)
5. (Italy) Nicola Pietrangeli (third round)
6. (Argentina) Enrique Morea (fourth round)
7. (Australia) Neale Fraser (fourth round)
8. (Japan) Kosei Kamo (second round)

== Draw ==
=== Key ===
- Q = Qualifier
- WC = Wild card
- LL = Lucky loser
- r = Retired

=== Final eight ===
Quarterfinals
4	(Australia) Lew Hoad	6	6	5	6
(United States) Sam Giammalva	3	2	7	3
15	(United States) Herbie Flam	2	3	4
1	(United States) Tony Trabert	6	6	6
2	(Australia) Ken Rosewall	6	9	2	6
5	(United States) Ham Richardson	4	7	6	3
13	(United States) Tut Bartzen	3	1	11
3	(United States) Vic Seixas	6	6	13

Semifinals
4	(Australia) Lew Hoad	4	2	1
1	(United States) Tony Trabert	6	6	6
2	(Australia) Ken Rosewall	6	6	7
3	(United States) Vic Seixas	4	4	5

Final
1	(United States) Tony Trabert	9	6	6
2	(Australia) Ken Rosewall	7	3	3

=== Earlier rounds ===
==== Section 1 ====
First round
(United States) Barker	9	6	6	1
(United States) Beale	11	2	8	6
(United States) Dodson	6	1	4	6	1
(Canada) Bédard	3	6	6	2	6
(Brazil) Moreira	w/o
(South Africa) Kupferburger
(United States) Rose	0	5	2
(Canada) Main	6	7	6
(United States) Meyer	7	3	6	2
(Canada) Barclay	9	6	4	6
(United States) Van Rensselaer	6	4	5
11	(United States) Larsen	8	6	7

Second round
4	(Australia) Hoad	6	6	6
(United States) Pharr	2	3	4
(United States) Beale	5	6	3	4
(Canada) Bédard	7	4	6	6
(South Africa) Kupferburger	6	7	6
(Canada) Main	2	5	4
(Canada) Barclay	5	2	6
11	(United States) Larsen	7	6	8

Third round
4	(Australia) Hoad	6	6	6
(Canada) Bédard	4	4	4
(South Africa) Kupferburger	3	3	6	3
11	(United States) Larsen	6	6	4	6

Fourth round
4	(Australia) Hoad	6	6	6
11	(United States) Larsen	2	4	2

==== Section 2 ====
First round
(United States) Freeman	1	0	0
16	(Japan) Kamo	6	6	6
(Canada) Fontana	4	2	4
(Australia) Anderson	6	6	6
(United States) Schaffer	2	1	2
(United States) Giammalva	6	6	6
(Italy) Merlo	1	4	1
(United Kingdom) Wilson	6	6	6
(United States) Ryland	1	3	3
(United States) Perry	6	6	6
(United States) Freedman	3	2	5
(United States) Harum	6	6	7
(United States) Bunis	2	2	4
(United States) Schwartz	6	6	6
7	(United States) Shea	4	6	6	5	2
(United States) Golden	6	3	3	7	6

Second round
16	(Japan) Kamo	6	13	6	6	6
(Australia) Anderson	8	11	4	8	8
(United States) Giammalva	6	6	6
(United Kingdom) Wilson	4	4	3
(United States) Perry	6	6	6
(United States) Harum	2	4	4
(United States) Schwartz	1	6	8	6
(United States) Golden	6	3	6	3

Third round
(Australia) Anderson	4	2	6	4
(United States) Giammalva	6	6	1	6
(United States) Perry	3	5	6
(United States) Schwartz	6	7	8

Fourth round
(United States) Giammalva	6	6	2	6
(United States) Schwartz	3	2	6	4

==== Section 3 ====
First round
(Lebanon) Hajjar	1	1	3
8	(Australia) Hartwig	6	6	6
(United States) Kerdasha	2	7	4
(United States) Stewart	6	9	6
(United States) Steele Jr.	6	1	4	6	2
(United States) Geller	0	6	6	4	6
(Chile) Garcia	6	1	1
(Italy) Gori	8	6	6
(United States) Demas	4	9	0
(United States) Brown	6	11	6
(United States) Neely	3	1	3
(United States) Mulloy	6	6	6
(Egypt) Najar	6	2	2	2
(United States) Davis	4	6	6	6
(United States) Baumgardner	0	6	6
15	(United States) Flam	6	8	8

Second round
8	(Australia) Hartwig	7	6	2	15
(United States) Stewart	5	4	6	13
(United States) Geller	7	6	6	6
(Italy) Gori	5	2	8	4
(United States) Brown	6	6	3	6
(United States) Mulloy	3	4	6	4
(United States) Davis	0	1	2
15	(United States) Flam	6	6	6

Third round
8	(Australia) Hartwig	6	6	6
(United States) Geller	2	3	3
(United States) Brown	3	6	7	9	7
15	(United States) Flam	6	3	5	11	9

Fourth round
8	(Australia) Hartwig	4	2	2
15	(United States) Flam	6	6	6

==== Section 4 ====
First round
(Australia) Radford	1	4	2
12	(Argentina) Morea	6	6	6
(United States) Brown	6	3	2	2
(United States) Andrews	2	6	6	6
(United States) Tully	4	3	1
(United States) Dorfman	6	6	6
(United States) Englander	1	2	4
(Australia) Cooper	6	6	6
(United States) Hollander	9	6	7	6	1
(United States) Ball	11	4	5	8	6
(United States) Vincent	0	0	3
(United States) Morris	6	6	6
(United States) Drobac	3	6	2
(Japan) Miyagi	6	8	6
(United Kingdom) Becker	0	4	1
1	(United States) Trabert	6	6	6

Second round
12	(Argentina) Morea	6	6	6
(United States) Andrews	4	2	3
(United States) Dorfman	2	6	3	4
(Australia) Cooper	6	3	6	6
(United States) Ball	0	0	1
(United States) Morris	6	6	6
(Japan) Miyagi	4	1	1
1	(United States) Trabert	6	6	6

Third round
12	(Argentina) Morea	1	7	13	6
(Australia) Cooper	6	5	11	3
(United States) Morris	4	4	1
1	(United States) Trabert	6	6	6

Fourth round
12	(Argentina) Morea	3	1	3
1	(United States) Trabert	6	6	6

==== Section 5 ====
First round
(United States) Dell	4	4	4
2	(Australia) Rosewall	6	6	6
(United States) Holmberg	6	8	6	6	3
(United States) Willner	4	6	8	8	6
(United States) Dalrymple	6	3	1	3
(United States) Harum	4	6	6	6
(United States) Powless	6	8	4	4
(United States) Cranis	8	6	6	6
(Chile) Garcia	6	2	3
(United States) Boys	8	6	6
(Canada) Rochon	6	5	6	6	6
(United States) Quay	1	7	3	8	8
(United States) Walraven	6	5	1	2
(United States) Longshore	4	7	6	6
(United States) Grant	1	7	1
9	(United States) Moylan	6	9	6

Second round
2	(Australia) Rosewall	7	6	6
(United States) Willner	5	3	2
(United States) Harum	6	15	6
(United States) Cranis	1	13	3
(United States) Boys	1	2	1
(United States) Quay	6	6	6
(United States) Longshore	1	1	7
9	(United States) Moylan	6	6	9

Third round
2	(Australia) Rosewall	6	8	6
(United States) Harum	2	6	3
(United States) Quay	3	6	5
9	(United States) Moylan	6	8	7

Fourth round
2	(Australia) Rosewall	6	6	6
9	(United States) Moylan	2	2	3

==== Section 6 ====
First round
(United States) Moody	4	4	3
10	(Italy) Pietrangeli	6	6	6
(United States) Stuckert	3	6	2
(United States) Green	6	8	6
(United States) Quillian	5	8	3	1
(United States) Reed	7	6	6	6
(United States) Thompson	10	6	4
(United States) Cohen	12	8	6
(United States) Cullen	4	4	7	3
(United States) Freishtat	6	6	5	6
(United States) Sobieraj	3	3	6	8
(United States) Coss	6	6	1	10
(United States) Dailey	5	5	5
(United States) Barker	7	7	7
(United States) Kauder	2	6	11	8	0
5	(United States) Richardson	6	3	9	10	6

Second round
10	(Italy) Pietrangeli	6	6	6
(United States) Green	1	4	4
(United States) Reed	6	6	6
(United States) Cohen	3	4	2
(United States) Freishtat	7	5	6	2
(United States) Coss	9	7	2	6
(United States) Barker	3	1	1
5	(United States) Richardson	6	6	6

Third round
10	(Italy) Pietrangeli	13	6	4	4	5
(United States) Reed	11	4	6	6	7
(United States) Coss	3	2	2
5	(United States) Richardson	6	6	6

Fourth round
(United States) Reed	3	4	6	4
5	(United States) Richardson	6	6	3	6

==== Section 7 ====
First round
(United States) Pierce	0	0	5
6	(Denmark) Nielsen	6	6	7
(United States) Martin	3	2	12	4
(Peru) Olmedo	6	6	10	6
(United States) Walraven	6	2	3	3
(Canada) Platt	4	6	6	6
(United States) Clothier	3	1	2
(United States) Burrows	6	6	6
(Chile) Hammersley	5	3	7	3
(Philippines) Deyro	7	6	5	6
(France) Chatrier	0	4	6	0
(United States) Gaines	6	6	4	6
(United States) Hettleman	1	6	5	4
(Brazil) Agüero	6	3	7	6
(United States) Henry	1	3	1
13	(United States) Bartzen	6	6	6

Second round
6	(Denmark) Nielsen	6	6	4	1	10
(Peru) Olmedo	1	2	6	6	8
(Canada) Platt	3	4	4
(United States) Burrows	6	6	6
(Philippines) Deyro	6	6	6
(United States) Gaines	2	4	4
(Brazil) Agüero	2	1	1
13	(United States) Bartzen	6	6	6

Third round
6	(Denmark) Nielsen	3	6	6	4	6
(United States) Burrows	6	3	2	6	8
(Philippines) Deyro	4	1	4
13	(United States) Bartzen	6	6	6

Fourth round
(United States) Burrows	0	1	2
13	(United States) Bartzen	6	6	6

==== Section 8 ====
First round
(United States) Maccracken	3	3	6	2
14	(Australia) Fraser	6	6	3	6
(United States) Wickel	6	1	7	0
(United States) Falkenburg	8	6	5	6
(Philippines) Jose	1	4	4
(United States) Raskind	6	6	6
(United States) Sorlien	4	5	7
(United States) MacKay	6	7	9
(United States) Freeman	1	2	0
(United States) Mayne	6	6	6
(France) Thieullent	0	3	1
(United States) Moss	6	6	6

Second round
14	(Australia) Fraser	6	7	6	6
(United States) Falkenburg	3	9	4	4
(United States) Raskind	1	4	8	4
(United States) MacKay	6	6	6	6
(United States) Mayne	6	6	6
(United States) Moss	4	3	2
(United Kingdom) Barrett	2	2	4
3	(United States) Seixas	6	6	6

Third round
14	(Australia) Fraser	6	6	6
(United States) MacKay	4	4	2
(United States) Mayne	2	3	3
3	(United States) Seixas	6	6	6

Fourth round
14	(Australia) Fraser	5	4	2
3	(United States) Seixas	7	6	6

Preceded by 1955 Wimbledon Championships – Men's singles	Grand Slam men's singles	Succeeded by 1956 Australian Championships – Men's singles
