= 1953 U.S. National Championships – Men's singles =

Men's singles
- 1953 U.S. National Championships

Final
- Champion: (United States) Tony Trabert
- Runner-up: (United States) Vic Seixas
- Score: 6–3, 6–2, 6–3

Events
Singles	men	women
Doubles	men	women
- U.S. National Championships

Tony Trabert defeated Vic Seixas 6–3, 6–2, 6–3 in the final to win the men's singles tennis title at the 1953 U.S. National Championships.

== Seeds ==
The tournament used two lists of eight players for seeding the men's singles event; one for U.S. players and one for foreign players. Tony Trabert is the champion; others show the round in which they were eliminated.

U.S.

1. (United States) Vic Seixas (finalist)
2. (United States) Tony Trabert (champion)
3. (United States) Gardnar Mulloy (quarterfinals)
4. (United States) Arthur Larsen (fourth round)
5. (United States) Ham Richardson (fourth round)
6. (United States) Straight Clark (third round)
7. (United States) Budge Patty (quarterfinals)
8. (United States) Tom Brown (fourth round)

Foreign

1. (Australia) Ken Rosewall (semifinals)
2. (Australia) Lew Hoad (semifinals)
3. (Australia) Mervyn Rose (fourth round)
4. (Denmark) Kurt Nielsen (quarterfinals)
5. (Australia) Rex Hartwig (second round)
6. (Argentina) Enrique Morea (second round)
7. (Sweden) Sven Davidson (quarterfinals)
8. (Australia) Ian Ayre (fourth round)

== Draw ==
=== Key ===
- Q = Qualifier
- WC = Wild card
- LL = Lucky loser
- r = Retired

=== Final eight ===
Quarterfinals
4	(Australia) Lew Hoad	6	6	11
5	(United States) Gardnar Mulloy	4	2	9
8	(Denmark) Kurt Nielsen	3	9	6	4
1	(United States) Vic Seixas	6	7	8	6
2	(Australia) Ken Rosewall	6	8	2	6	11
14	(Sweden) Sven Davidson	0	10	6	0	9
13	(United States) Budge Patty	4	4	2
3	(United States) Tony Trabert	6	6	6

Semifinals
4	(Australia) Lew Hoad	5	4	4
1	(United States) Vic Seixas	7	6	6
2	(Australia) Ken Rosewall	5	3	3
3	(United States) Tony Trabert	7	6	6

Final
1	(United States) Vic Seixas	3	2	3
3	(United States) Tony Trabert	6	6	6

=== Earlier rounds ===
==== Section 1 ====
First round
(United States) Been	7	3	10	4
(United States) Doss	9	6	8	6
(United States) Tully	4	1	1
(United States) Stewart	6	6	6
(United Kingdom) Becker	5	3	4
9	(United States) Richardson	7	6	6

Second round
4	(Australia) Hoad	6	6	9
(United States) Hagist	3	1	7
(United States) Johnson	8	9	3	4	4
(United States) Davis	6	7	6	6	6
(United States) Dorfman	11	6	6
(United States) Doss	9	3	3
(United States) Stewart	1	7	6	1
9	(United States) Richardson	6	9	3	6

Third round
4	(Australia) Hoad	6	6	6
(United States) Davis	3	2	3
(United States) Dorfman	4	1	1
9	(United States) Richardson	6	6	6

Fourth round
4	(Australia) Hoad	6	6	6
9	(United States) Richardson	3	4	4

==== Section 2 ====
First round
(Japan) Kimura	1	5	7
12	(Argentina) Morea	6	7	9
(United States) Burrows	6	4	5	0
(Denmark) Ulrich	4	6	7	6
(United States) Boys	6	4	3	10	5
(United States) Stewart	4	6	6	8	7
(Spain) Vijande	2	2	3
(United States) Dailey	6	6	6
(United States) Bentley	3	3	3
(United States) Drobac	6	6	6
(United States) Anderson	2	1	6	6	5
(United Kingdom) Barrett	6	6	3	4	7
(United States) Alleyne	2	3	1
(United States) Squires	6	6	6
(United States) Sweeney	4	5	4
5	(United States) Mulloy	6	7	6

Second round
12	(Argentina) Morea	5	2	4
(Denmark) Ulrich	7	6	6
(United States) Stewart	9	3	4
(United States) Dailey	11	6	6
(United States) Drobac	6	7	1	4
(United Kingdom) Barrett	2	9	6	6
(United States) Squires	2	3	1
5	(United States) Mulloy	6	6	6

Third round
(Denmark) Ulrich	6	6	6
(United States) Dailey	4	4	2
(United Kingdom) Barrett	4	3	1
5	(United States) Mulloy	6	6	6

Fourth round
(Denmark) Ulrich	6	3	5	2
5	(United States) Mulloy	3	6	7	6

==== Section 3 ====
First round
(United States) Ball	5	2	2
8	(Denmark) Nielsen	7	6	6
(United States) Steiner	3	4	5
(United States) Flam	6	6	7
(United States) Osburn	7	2	2	5
(United States) Paton	5	6	6	7
(United States) Stern	4	6	4	5
(Canada) Bedard	6	3	6	7
(Puerto Rico) Pasarell	3	2	2
(United States) Cranston	6	6	6
(United States) Bradford	5	5	7
(United States) Kovaleski	7	7	9
(United States) Likas	4	5	4
(United States) Perry	6	7	6
(United States) Potts	6	1	1	3
11	(United States) Clark	4	6	6	6

Second round
8	(Denmark) Nielsen	6	6	10
(United States) Flam	4	4	8
(United States) Paton	3	7	12	6	6
(Canada) Bedard	6	9	10	2	3
(United States) Cranston	4	0	3
(United States) Kovaleski	6	6	6
(United States) Perry	4	3	6	5
11	(United States) Clark	6	6	1	7

Third round
8	(Denmark) Nielsen	2	6	6	2	6
(United States) Paton	6	3	4	6	4
(United States) Kovaleski	6	9	7	7
11	(United States) Clark	3	11	5	5

Fourth round
8	(Denmark) Nielsen	6	5	4	6	6
(United States) Kovaleski	3	7	6	4	4

==== Section 4 ====
First round
(United States) Willner	9	3	4
10	(Australia) Hartwig	11	6	6
(United States) Thompson	2	1	1
(United States) Talbert	6	6	6
(Mexico) Ortega	2	6	7	4	2
(United States) Quillian	6	3	5	6	6
(United States) Raskind	4	6	3	2
(Chile) Balbiers	6	2	6	6
(United States) Kaiser	1	4	2
(United States) Golden	6	6	6
(United States) Gerhardt	2	1	0
(Canada) Willey	6	6	6
(United States) Eisenberg	3	4	4
(United States) Grigry	6	6	6
(United States) Stern	2	2	1
1	(United States) Seixas	6	6	6

Second round
10	(Australia) Hartwig	7	2	4	4
(United States) Talbert	5	6	6	6
(United States) Quillian	6	6	10	6
(Chile) Balbiers	1	2	12	3
(United States) Golden	6	6	6
(Canada) Willey	4	3	2
(United States) Grigry	2	7	1
1	(United States) Seixas	6	9	6

Third round
(United States) Talbert	6	6	6
(United States) Quillian	2	3	3
(United States) Golden	2	4	6	3
1	(United States) Seixas	6	6	3	6

Fourth round
(United States) Talbert	2	0	0
1	(United States) Seixas	6	6	6

==== Section 5 ====
First round
(United States) Bartzen	0	4	2
2	(Australia) Rosewall	6	6	6
(United States) Hawley	3	6	3
(Canada) Rochon	6	8	6
(United States) Shields	5	10	6	6	5
(United States) Sorlien	7	12	1	4	7
(United States) McDonald	4	4	1
(Mexico) Reyes	6	6	6
(United States) Maccracken	7	3	2	3
(Japan) Kamo	5	6	6	6
(United States) MacKay	2	4	3
(United States) Garrett	6	6	6
(United States) Arnold	1	2	1
(Chile) Ayala	6	6	6
(United States) Flye	4	4	4
15	(United States) Brown	6	6	6

Second round
2	(Australia) Rosewall	8	6	6
(Canada) Rochon	6	3	2
(United States) Sorlien	3	5	6	3
(Mexico) Reyes	6	7	4	6
(Japan) Kamo	2	8	6	2
(United States) Garrett	6	10	1	6
(Chile) Ayala	4	0	3
15	(United States) Brown	6	6	6

Third round
2	(Australia) Rosewall	6	4	6	6
(Mexico) Reyes	4	6	1	2
(United States) Garrett	6	3	2
15	(United States) Brown	8	6	6

Fourth round
2	(Australia) Rosewall	9	7	6
15	(United States) Brown	7	5	2

==== Section 6 ====
First round
(Canada) Macken	2	2	2
14	(Sweden) Davidson	6	6	6
(United States) Warden	0	6	3
(United States) Moss	6	8	6
(United States) Englander	4	4	3
(United States) Gaines	6	6	6
(United States) Land	2	2	1
(United States) Kauder	6	6	6
(Czechoslovakia) Hecht	4	2	8	2
(United States) Schnaars	6	6	6	6
(United States) Seymour	1	5	3
(United States) Shea	6	7	6
(Japan) Miyagi	4	8	6	4
(Australia) Wilderspin	6	10	3	6
(Mexico) Llamas	1	1	8
7	(United States) Larsen	6	6	10

Second round
14	(Sweden) Davidson	6	3	2	6	6
(United States) Moss	3	6	6	4	3
(United States) Gaines	3	4	2
(United States) Kauder	6	6	6
(United States) Schnaars	3	1	1
(United States) Shea	6	6	6
(Australia) Wilderspin	2	6	2	6
7	(United States) Larsen	6	1	6	8

Third round
14	(Sweden) Davidson	6	6	6
(United States) Kauder	1	3	3
(United States) Shea	7	9	4
7	(United States) Larsen	9	11	6

Fourth round
14	(Sweden) Davidson	1	3	6	6	6
7	(United States) Larsen	6	6	1	4	4

==== Section 7 ====
First round
(United States) Morris	10	9	3	2	2
6	(Australia) Rose	8	7	6	6	6
(Mexico) Contreras	3	6	9	6
(United States) Schwartz	6	4	11	8
(United States) Steele Jr.	6	7	3	2	4
(United States) Browne	2	5	6	6	6
(United States) Martin	5	1	5
(Canada) Main	7	6	7
(United States) Rogers	6	2	4	7
(United States) Wood	3	6	6	9
(United States) Longshore	8	5	3	5
(United States) Masterson	6	7	6	7
(United States) Schulze	2	3	4
(United States) Mayne	6	6	6
(United States) Clothier	1	2	1
13	(United States) Patty	6	6	6

Second round
6	(Australia) Rose	6	6	6
(United States) Schwartz	3	4	1
(United States) Browne	0	3	4
(Canada) Main	6	6	6
(United States) Wood	6	1	4	5
(United States) Masterson	4	6	6	7
(United States) Mayne	9	6	4	3	1
13	(United States) Patty	7	2	6	6	6

Third round
6	(Australia) Rose	6	9	6
(Canada) Main	2	7	2
(United States) Masterson	2	3	3
13	(United States) Patty	6	6	6

Fourth round
6	(Australia) Rose	9	4	2	3
13	(United States) Patty	7	6	6	6

==== Section 8 ====
First round
(United States) Vincent	3	3	4
16	(Australia) Ayre	6	6	6
(United States) Cohen	w/o
(United States) Warden
(United States) Hettleman	2	8	6	3	4
(United States) Pierce	6	6	2	6	6

Second round
16	(Australia) Ayre	6	6	6
(United States) Warden	1	0	0
(United States) Pierce	3	7	6	2
(United States) Frost	6	9	3	6
(United States) Peterson	6	6	8
(Canada) Fontana	4	3	6
(United States) Sullivan	2	2	1
3	(United States) Trabert	6	6	6

Third round
16	(Australia) Ayre	6	14	6
(United States) Frost	4	12	0
(United States) Peterson	3	2	0
3	(United States) Trabert	6	6	6

Fourth round
16	(Australia) Ayre	2	5	2
3	(United States) Trabert	6	7	6

Preceded by 1953 Wimbledon Championships – Men's singles	Grand Slam men's singles	Succeeded by 1954 Australian Championships – Men's singles
