= 1956 U.S. National Championships – Men's singles =

Men's singles
- 1956 U.S. National Championships

Final
- Champion: (Australia) Ken Rosewall
- Runner-up: (Australia) Lew Hoad
- Score: 4–6, 6–2, 6–3, 6–3

Details
- Draw: 128
- Seeds: 8

Events
| Singles | men | women | | boys | girls |
| Doubles | men | women | mixed | boys | girls |
- U.S. National Championships

Ken Rosewall defeated Lew Hoad 4–6, 6–2, 6–3, 6–3 in the final to win the men's singles tennis title at the 1956 U.S. National Championships. Hoad was attempting to complete the Grand Slam.

== Seeds ==
The seeded players are listed below. Ken Rosewall is the champion; others show the round in which they were eliminated.

1. (Australia) Lew Hoad (finalist)
2. (Australia) Ken Rosewall (champion)
3. (United States) Ham Richardson (quarterfinals)
4. (United States) Vic Seixas (semifinals)
5. (Australia) Neale Fraser (semifinals)
6. (Australia) Ashley Cooper (quarterfinals)
7. (Sweden) Ulf Schmidt (third round)
8. (United States) Dick Savitt (quarterfinals)

== Draw ==
=== Key ===
- Q = Qualifier
- WC = Wild card
- LL = Lucky loser
- r = Retired

=== Final eight ===
Quarterfinals
5 | (Australia) Neale Fraser | 3 | 6 | 6 | 6
3 | (United States) Ham Richardson | 6 | 3 | 2 | 4
(Australia) Roy Emerson | 6 | 3 | 5
1 | (Australia) Lew Hoad | 8 | 6 | 7
6 | (Australia) Ashley Cooper | 7 | 6 | 7 | 12 | 4
4 | (United States) Vic Seixas | 9 | 3 | 9 | 10 | 6
8 | (United States) Dick Savitt | 4 | 5 | 6 | 10 | 1
2 | (Australia) Ken Rosewall | 6 | 7 | 4 | 8 | 6

Semifinals
5 | (Australia) Neale Fraser | 13 | 2 | 4
1 | (Australia) Lew Hoad | 15 | 6 | 6
4 | (United States) Vic Seixas | 8 | 0 | 3
2 | (Australia) Ken Rosewall | 10 | 6 | 6

Final
1 | (Australia) Lew Hoad | 6 | 2 | 3 | 3
2 | (Australia) Ken Rosewall | 4 | 6 | 6 | 6

=== Earlier rounds ===
==== Section 1 ====
First round
(United Kingdom) Daniels | 2 | 5 | 4
(United States) Mendel | 6 | 7 | 6
(United States) Sledge | 3 | 3 | 1
(United States) Shea | 6 | 6 | 6
(United States) Morgan | 3 | 1 | 6 | 9 | 4
(United States) Meyer | 6 | 6 | 3 | 7 | 6
(Canada) Rochon | 2 | 1 | 2
(United States) Frost | 6 | 6 | 6
(Argentina) Furlong | 2 | 6 | 4
(United States) Gaines | 6 | 8 | 6
(United States) Vincent | 0 | 0 | 3
(United States) Dorfman | 6 | 6 | 6
(United States) Wood | 4 | 3 | 0
(South Africa) Kupferburger | 6 | 6 | 6
(United States) Maccracken | 2 | 4 | 2
5 | (Australia) Fraser | 6 | 6 | 6

Second round
(United States) Mendel | 2 | 3 | 1
(United States) Shea | 6 | 6 | 6
(United States) Meyer | 2 | 2 | 1
(United States) Frost | 6 | 6 | 6
(United States) Gaines | 4 | 5 | 0
(United States) Dorfman | 6 | 7 | 6
(South Africa) Kupferburger | 3 | 5 | 8 | 5
5 | (Australia) Fraser | 6 | 7 | 6 | 7

Third round
(United States) Shea | 6 | 10 | 6
(United States) Frost | 3 | 8 | 3
(United States) Dorfman | 4 | 4 | 4
5 | (Australia) Fraser | 6 | 6 | 6

Fourth round
(United States) Shea | 7 | 3 | 3 | 8
5 | (Australia) Fraser | 5 | 6 | 6 | 10

==== Section 2 ====
First round
(Australia) Anderson | 3 | 4 | 2
(United States) Green | 6 | 6 | 6
(United States) Powless | 5 | 2 | 1
(Mexico) Llamas | 7 | 6 | 6
(Italy) Gori | 6 | 1 | 0
(Peru) Olmedo | 8 | 6 | 6
(United States) Ball | 8 | 6 | 2 | 1 | 3
(United States) Quay | 6 | 3 | 6 | 6 | 6
(United States) Leslie | 1 | 2 | 1
(United States) MacKay | 6 | 6 | 6
(Chile) Garcia | 7 | 3 | 3
(United States) Quillian | 9 | 6 | 6
(Canada) Main | 0 | 3 | 1
(United Kingdom) Becker | 6 | 6 | 6
(Australia) Laver | 1 | 2 | 3
3 | (United States) Richardson | 6 | 6 | 6

Second round
(United States) Green | 6 | 6 | 6
(Mexico) Llamas | 3 | 4 | 1
(Peru) Olmedo | 8 | 6 | 6
(United States) Quay | 6 | 1 | 2
(United States) MacKay | 6 | 4 | 3 | 2
(United States) Quillian | 4 | 6 | 6 | 6
(United Kingdom) Becker | 2 | 0 | 4
3 | (United States) Richardson | 6 | 6 | 6

Third round
(United States) Green | 3 | 4 | 4
(Peru) Olmedo | 6 | 6 | 6
(United States) Quillian | 6 | 2 | 2 | 2
3 | (United States) Richardson | 4 | 6 | 6 | 6

Fourth round
(Peru) Olmedo | 5 | 2 | 0
3 | (United States) Richardson | 7 | 6 | 6

==== Section 3 ====
First round
(France) Haillet | 4 | 2 | 4
(United States) Flam | 6 | 6 | 6
(United States) Fox | 6 | 3 | 4 | 3
(Canada) Fontana | 3 | 6 | 6 | 6
(United States) Thompson | 2 | 1 | 4
(Australia) Emerson | 6 | 6 | 6
(United States) Dell | 7 | 6 | 8 | 3 | 11
(United Kingdom) Knight | 5 | 3 | 10 | 6 | 13
(United States) Farrin | 4 | 1 | 10 | 1
(United States) Perry | 6 | 6 | 8 | 6
(United States) Buchholz | 3 | 1 | 4
(South Africa) Segal | 6 | 6 | 6
(Canada) Platt | 1 | 3 | 3
(United States) Cranston | 6 | 6 | 6
(United States) Morris | 3 | 2 | 4
7 | (Sweden) Schmidt | 6 | 6 | 6

Second round
(United States) Flam | 6 | 6 | 6
(Canada) Fontana | 1 | 2 | 1
(Australia) Emerson | 3 | 6 | 6 | 8
(United Kingdom) Knight | 6 | 4 | 3 | 6
(United States) Perry | 2 | 1 | 5
(South Africa) Segal | 6 | 6 | 7
(United States) Cranston | 2 | 3 | 1
7 | (Sweden) Schmidt | 6 | 6 | 6

Third round
(United States) Flam | 1 | 1 | 6 | 5
(Australia) Emerson | 6 | 6 | 3 | 7
(South Africa) Segal | 8 | 9 | 5 | 7
7 | (Sweden) Schmidt | 6 | 7 | 7 | 5

Fourth round
(Australia) Emerson | 9 | 7 | 6 | 6
(South Africa) Segal | 11 | 5 | 2 | 1

==== Section 4 ====
First round
(United States) Cranis | 4 | 4 | 1
(United States) Clark | 6 | 6 | 6
(Canada) Harit | 0 | 1 | 1
(United States) Golden | 6 | 6 | 6
(United States) Neely | 1 | 4 | 5
(United States) Schmidt | 6 | 6 | 7
(United States) Krais | 0 | 2 | 6 | 3
(United States) Moss | 6 | 6 | 4 | 6
(United States) Crawford | 2 | 2 | 3
(United States) Mulloy | 6 | 6 | 6
(United States) Grant | 0 | 1 | 7 | 3
(United States) Moylan | 6 | 6 | 5 | 6
(Indonesia) Gan | 2 | 0 | 2
(United States) Dodson | 6 | 6 | 6
(United States) Walraven | 0 | 2 | 0
1 | (Australia) Hoad | 6 | 6 | 6

Second round
(United States) Clark | 1 | 11 | 2 | 4
(United States) Golden | 6 | 9 | 6 | 6
(United States) Schmidt | 5 | 6 | 9 | 7 | 2
(United States) Moss | 7 | 2 | 7 | 9 | 6
(United States) Mulloy | 3 | 3 | 4
(United States) Moylan | 6 | 6 | 6
(United States) Dodson | 6 | 0 | 3 | 1
1 | (Australia) Hoad | 3 | 6 | 6 | 6

Third round
(United States) Golden | 7 | 6 | 1 | 6
(United States) Moss | 5 | 3 | 6 | 2
(United States) Moylan | 9 | 3 | 4
1 | (Australia) Hoad | 11 | 6 | 6

Fourth round
(United States) Golden | 3 | 2 | 5
1 | (Australia) Hoad | 6 | 6 | 7

==== Section 5 ====
First round
(United States) Walraven | 2 | 4 | 3
(United States) Henry | 6 | 6 | 6
(United States) Holmberg | 4 | 4 | 2
(United States) Giammalva | 6 | 6 | 6
(United States) Freeman | 0 | 2 | 4
(United States) Geller | 6 | 6 | 6
(United States) Jordan | 2 | 7 | 3
(United States) Schwartz | 6 | 9 | 6
(United States) Schoonmaker | 6 | 3 | 7 | 1
(United States) Davis | 3 | 6 | 9 | 6
(United States) Noble | 6 | 8 | 0 | 3
(United States) Franks | 4 | 10 | 6 | 6
(United States) Paton | 3 | 2 | 3
(United States) Bartzen | 6 | 6 | 6
(United States) Dailey | 3 | 3 | 2
6 | (Australia) Cooper | 6 | 6 | 6

Second round
(United States) Henry | 4 | 2 | 11 | 5
(United States) Giammalva | 6 | 6 | 9 | 7
(United States) Geller | 1 | 2 | 6 | 1
(United States) Schwartz | 6 | 6 | 2 | 6
(United States) Davis | 6 | 2 | 1 | 1
(United States) Franks | 3 | 6 | 6 | 6
(United States) Bartzen | 7 | 3 | 10 | 4
6 | (Australia) Cooper | 9 | 6 | 8 | 6

Third round
(United States) Giammalva | 7 | 6 | 6
(United States) Schwartz | 5 | 1 | 4
(United States) Franks | 6 | 3 | 4 | 7 | 4
6 | (Australia) Cooper | 4 | 6 | 6 | 5 | 6

Fourth round
(United States) Giammalva | 6 | 6 | 4 | 3 | 5
6 | (Australia) Cooper | 3 | 3 | 6 | 6 | 7

==== Section 6 ====
First round
(United States) Brown | 5 | 8 | 6 | 4 | 2
(United States) Perry | 7 | 6 | 3 | 6 | 6
(United States) Eltzholtz | 2 | 7 | 2
(Denmark) Ulrich | 6 | 9 | 6
(United States) Van Rensselaer | 6 | 5 | 3 | 8
(United States) Garrido | 4 | 7 | 6 | 10
(United States) Freeman | 2 | 3 | 4
(United States) Harum | 6 | 6 | 6
(United States) Raskind | 6 | 3 | 2 | 2
(Brazil) Vieira | 3 | 6 | 6 | 6
(United States) Boys | 0 | 3 | 3
(Chile) Ayala | 6 | 6 | 6
(Ecuador) Lerque | 1 | 1 | 2
(France) Darmon | 6 | 6 | 6
(United Kingdom) Davies | 3 | 6 | 10 | 3 | 5
4 | (United States) Seixas | 6 | 3 | 8 | 6 | 7

Second round
(United States) Perry | 1 | 1 | 1
(Denmark) Ulrich | 6 | 6 | 6
(United States) Garrido | 14 | 6 | 4 | 6
(United States) Harum | 12 | 3 | 6 | 4
(Brazil) Vieira | 2 | 4 | 1
(Chile) Ayala | 6 | 6 | 6
(France) Darmon | 3 | 3 | 6 | 5
4 | (United States) Seixas | 6 | 6 | 3 | 7

Third round
(Denmark) Ulrich | 6 | 6 | 6
(United States) Garrido | 4 | 3 | 1
(Chile) Ayala | 6 | 6 | 6 | 10 | 6
4 | (United States) Seixas | 8 | 4 | 3 | 12 | 8

Fourth round
(Denmark) Ulrich | 6 | 3 | 4 | 3
4 | (United States) Seixas | 3 | 6 | 6 | 6

==== Section 7 ====
First round
(United Kingdom) Clayton | 6 | 3 | 3 | 6 | 2
(United States) Reed | 4 | 6 | 6 | 4 | 6
(Brazil) Bueno-Nete | 1 | 2 | 6
(United States) Steele Jr. | 6 | 6 | 8
(United States) Wood | 6 | 2 | 6 | 3
(United States) Barker | 8 | 6 | 0 | 6
(United States) Tully | 6 | 3 | 8 | 5
(Mexico) Contreras | 4 | 6 | 10 | 7
(United States) Ter Borg | 4 | 1 | 4
(United States) Sorlien | 6 | 6 | 6
(United States) Ogden | 1 | 2 | 6 | 2
(United States) Coss | 6 | 6 | 4 | 6
(United States) Longshore | 3 | 3 | 5
(United States) Harum | 6 | 6 | 7
(United States) Snyder | 6 | 1 | 1 | 0
8 | (United States) Savitt | 1 | 6 | 6 | 6

Second round
(United States) Reed | 6 | 6 | 6 | 6
(United States) Steele Jr. | 8 | 0 | 3 | 2
(United States) Barker | 2 | 1 | 2
(Mexico) Contreras | 6 | 6 | 6
(United States) Sorlien | 6 | 4 | 6 | 3 | 7
(United States) Coss | 2 | 6 | 4 | 6 | 9
(United States) Harum | 0 | 1 | 0
8 | (United States) Savitt | 6 | 6 | 6

Third round
(United States) Reed | 4 | 6 | 5 | 3
(Mexico) Contreras | 6 | 3 | 7 | 6
(United States) Coss | 1 | 2 | 3
8 | (United States) Savitt | 6 | 6 | 6

Fourth round
(Mexico) Contreras | 3 | 2 | 2
8 | (United States) Savitt | 6 | 6 | 6

==== Section 8 ====
First round
(United States) Andrews | 3 | 4 | 5
(United States) Mayne | 6 | 6 | 7
(United States) Freedman | 0 | 1 | 5
(Canada) Bédard | 6 | 6 | 7
(United States) Stern | 2 | 4 | 5
(United States) Stewart | 6 | 6 | 7
(United Kingdom) Owen | 4 | 5 | 4
(United States) Cullen | 6 | 7 | 6
(United States) Lesch | 2 | 2 | 1
(United States) Kuross | 6 | 6 | 6
(Australia) Mark | 6 | 2 | 1 | 5
(United States) Larsen | 3 | 6 | 6 | 7
(United States) Land | 0 | 2 | 2
(France) Rémy | 6 | 6 | 6
(United Kingdom) Robinson | 1 | 0 | 1
2 | (Australia) Rosewall | 6 | 6 | 6

Second round
(United States) Mayne | 6 | 4 | 7 | 3
(Canada) Bédard | 4 | 6 | 9 | 6
(United States) Stewart | 6 | 6 | 6
(United States) Cullen | 3 | 3 | 1
(United States) Kuross | 2 | 4 | 12
(United States) Larsen | 6 | 6 | 14
(France) Rémy | 1 | 4 | 2
2 | (Australia) Rosewall | 6 | 6 | 6

Third round
(Canada) Bédard | 11 | 2 | 4 | 4
(United States) Stewart | 9 | 6 | 6 | 6
(United States) Larsen | 3 | 2 | 2
2 | (Australia) Rosewall | 6 | 6 | 6

Fourth round
(United States) Stewart | 6 | 7 | 1 | 2
2 | (Australia) Rosewall | 2 | 9 | 6 | 6

| Preceded by 1956 Wimbledon Championships – Men's singles | Grand Slam men's singles | Succeeded by 1957 Australian Championships – Men's singles |
