= 1957 U.S. National Championships – Men's singles =

Men's singles
- 1957 U.S. National Championships

Final
- Champion: (Australia) Mal Anderson
- Runner-up: (Australia) Ashley Cooper
- Score: 10–8, 7–5, 6–4

Details
- Draw: 128
- Seeds: 8

Events
Singles	men	women
Doubles	men	women
- U.S. National Championships

Mal Anderson defeated Ashley Cooper 10–8, 7–5, 6–4 in the final to win the men's singles tennis title at the 1957 U.S. National Championships.

== Seeds ==
The seeded players are listed below. Mal Anderson is the champion; others show the round in which they were eliminated.

1. (Australia) Ashley Cooper (finalist)
2. (United States) Dick Savitt (fourth round)
3. (Sweden) Sven Davidson (semifinals)
4. (United States) Vic Seixas (quarterfinals)
5. (Australia) Neale Fraser (third round)
6. (United States) Ham Richardson (second round)
7. (United States) J.E. Patty (quarterfinals)
8. (United States) Herbie Flam (semifinals)

== Draw ==
=== Key ===
- Q = Qualifier
- WC = Wild card
- LL = Lucky loser
- r = Retired

=== Finals ===
Quarterfinals
1	(Australia) Ashley Cooper	6	6	6
7	(United States) J.E. Patty	3	3	4
4	(United States) Vic Seixas	4	6	4	6	1
8	(United States) Herbie Flam	6	3	6	4	6
(Australia) Mal Anderson	6	6	6
(Chile) Luis Ayala	1	3	1
3	(Sweden) Sven Davidson	3	6	7	6
(United States) Clifton Mayne	6	3	5	4

Semifinals
1	(Australia) Ashley Cooper	6	7	6
8	(United States) Herbie Flam	1	5	4
(Australia) Mal Anderson	5	6	4	6	6
3	(Sweden) Sven Davidson	7	2	6	3	4

Final
1	(Australia) Ashley Cooper	8	5	4
(Australia) Mal Anderson	10	7	6

=== Earlier rounds ===
==== Section 1 ====
First round
1	(Australia) Cooper	6	6	6
(United States) Brownlow	4	3	4
(United States) Dorfman	6	6	6
(United States) Lyman	1	2	1
(United States) Bartzen	6	6	6
(United States) Harris	0	0	2
(United States) Holmberg	6	6	6
(United States) Erickson	2	2	2
(United States) McKinley	7	4	6	6
(United States) Wood	5	6	4	3
(United States) Vincent	7	6	6
(United States) McClung	5	2	2
(United States) Perry	3	7	6	4	6
(United States) Cranis	6	5	3	6	1
(United States) Coss	6	6	6
(United States) Scarlett	2	2	3

Second round
1	(Australia) Cooper	6	6	6
(United States) Dorfman	1	1	3
(United States) Bartzen	7	7	3	8	3
(United States) Holmberg	9	5	6	6	6
(United States) McKinley	3	3	0
(United States) Vincent	6	6	6
(United States) Perry	4	5	6	6	4
(United States) Coss	6	7	2	4	6

Third round
1	(Australia) Cooper	12	6	7
(United States) Holmberg	10	3	5
(United States) Vincent	7	6	6
(United States) Coss	5	0	4

Fourth round
1	(Australia) Cooper	6	6	6
(United States) Vincent	3	2	2

==== Section 2 ====
First round
7	(United States) Patty	6	6	6
(United States) Schaffer	4	3	4
(United States) Moody	7	10	6
(United States) Stewart	5	8	3
(United States) Golden
(United States) Been	w/o
(United States) Nagler	6	8	3	6	7
(United States) Werksman	4	10	6	2	5
(United States) Raskind	7	6	6
(United States) Howe	5	2	2
(Canada) Fontana	6	6	6
(United States) Boys	4	2	4
(United States) Clark	6	6	6
(United States) Longshore	4	1	3
(United States) Farrin	1	6	6	6
(United States) Atkinson	6	3	2	0

Second round
7	(United States) Patty	6	6	6
(United States) Moody	4	2	3
(United States) Golden	6	6	6
(United States) Nagler	2	4	2
(United States) Raskind	1	6	5	5
(Canada) Fontana	6	4	7	7
(United States) Clark	3	4	6	2
(United States) Farrin	6	6	2	6

Third round
7	(United States) Patty	6	8	4	6	8
(United States) Golden	3	10	6	3	6
(Canada) Fontana	7	6	6
(United States) Farrin	5	4	3

Fourth round
7	(United States) Patty	6	6	9
(Canada) Fontana	4	2	7

==== Section 3 ====
First round
4	(United States) Seixas	6	6	6
(United States) Roberts	2	2	0
(United States) Reed	6	6	6
(United States) McNair	3	0	4
(Mexico) Reyes	3	6	6	6
(United States) Scott	6	2	0	3
(Brazil) Vieira	6	8	5	6
(United States) Morgan	4	6	7	2
(United States) Leslie	6	6	7
(Israel) Dubitsky	4	3	5
(Australia) Emerson	6	6	6
(Bermuda) Alger	1	2	2
(Australia) Gould
(United States) Foster	w/o
(United States) Schwartz	11	8	15	6	6
(United States) Delgado	13	6	17	0	3

Second round
4	(United States) Seixas	6	3	4	6	6
(United States) Reed	4	6	6	2	3
(Mexico) Reyes	3	6	2
(Brazil) Vieira	6	8	6
(United States) Leslie	2	3	1
(Australia) Emerson	6	6	6
(Australia) Gould	1	0	0
(United States) Schwartz	6	6	6

Third round
4	(United States) Seixas	6	6	6
(Brazil) Vieira	4	4	1
(Australia) Emerson	6	6	6
(United States) Schwartz	0	4	1

Fourth round
4	(United States) Seixas	6	6	6
(Australia) Emerson	3	2	4

==== Section 4 ====
First round
8	(United States) Flam	6	11	1	6
(Peru) Olmedo	4	9	6	0
(United States) Fox	7	6	6
(United States) Mangan	5	2	3
(United States) Green	11	6	6
(United States) Brown	9	3	3
(United States) Mulloy	6	6	6
(United States) Stern	4	1	3
(United States) Cranston	6	3	6	5	6
(United States) Ball	2	6	1	7	4
(United States) Giammalva	9	6	6
(United States) Crawford	7	1	2
(Australia) Howe	6	6	6
(United States) Shakespeare	2	2	1
(United Kingdom) Davies	10	5	6	6
(United States) Bowditch	8	7	1	2

Second round
8	(United States) Flam	6	6	6
(United States) Fox	1	3	3
(United States) Green	6	6	7
(United States) Mulloy	0	4	5
(United States) Cranston	3	4	13	7	6
(United States) Giammalva	6	6	11	5	3
(Australia) Howe	7	1	6	4	6
(United Kingdom) Davies	5	6	2	6	1

Third round
8	(United States) Flam	8	2	6	7
(United States) Green	6	6	1	5
(United States) Cranston	4	5	3
(Australia) Howe	6	7	6

Fourth round
8	(United States) Flam	6	6	6
(Australia) Howe	4	4	4

==== Section 5 ====
First round
2	(United States) Savitt	6	6	6
(United States) Maccracken	1	0	4
(South Africa) Kupferburger	6	6	6
(United States) Davis	2	1	1
(United States) Hoffman Jr	4	3	8	6	8
(United States) Cullen	6	6	6	1	6
(India) Krishnan	6	6	6
(United States) Harum	4	3	1
(United States) Van Rensselaer	8	6	8
(Chile) Rodríguez	6	2	6
(Australia) Anderson	9	6	6
(Japan) Kamo	7	3	2
(United States) Grant	6	7	6
(United States) Barker	1	5	2
(United States) Corley	8	6	6
(United States) Schoonmaker	6	2	3

Second round
2	(United States) Savitt	6	6	6
(South Africa) Kupferburger	3	3	3
(United States) Hoffman Jr	1	1	0
(India) Krishnan	6	6	6
(United States) Van Rensselaer	2	2	2
(Australia) Anderson	6	6	6
(United States) Grant	6	6	6	6
(United States) Corley	8	3	1	4

Third round
2	(United States) Savitt	6	8	7
(India) Krishnan	1	6	5
(Australia) Anderson	6	6	6
(United States) Grant	4	0	3

Fourth round
2	(United States) Savitt	4	3	1
(Australia) Anderson	6	6	6

==== Section 6 ====
First round
6	(United States) Richardson	6	6	6
(United States) Gottlieb	0	0	2
(Denmark) Nielsen	6	7	6
(United States) Henry	4	5	2
(United States) Franks	6	6	6
(United States) Nelson	4	1	3
(United States) Dailey	7	5	6	6
(United States) Tully	5	7	4	4
(United States) Buchholz	6	6	6
(United States) Tierney	3	0	1
(United States) Shea	6	6	6
(United States) Walraven	2	3	1
(United States) Potthast	6	6	4	6
(United States) Bank	4	1	6	4
(Chile) Ayala	6	6	6
(United States) Sorlien	3	2	4

Second round
6	(United States) Richardson	6	6	11	5	3
(Denmark) Nielsen	3	4	13	7	6
(United States) Franks	6	6	6
(United States) Dailey	3	4	4
(United States) Buchholz	7	4	6	3
(United States) Shea	9	6	3	6
(United States) Potthast	2	5	2
(Chile) Ayala	6	7	6

Third round
(Denmark) Nielsen	8	6	8	6
(United States) Franks	10	0	6	3
(United States) Shea	7	4	1	2
(Chile) Ayala	5	6	6	6

Fourth round
(Denmark) Nielsen	4	4	6
(Chile) Ayala	6	6	8

==== Section 7 ====
First round
3	(Sweden) Davidson	6	6	9
(United States) Masterson	1	1	7
(United States) Quillian	8	6	6
(United States) Walraven	6	1	3
(Canada) Rochon	6	9	8
(United States) Sledge	3	7	6
(United States) Dell	6	6	6
(United States) Ogden	3	4	2
(Australia) Mark	6	6	6
(United States) Freeman	1	1	2
(United States) MacKay	6	6	6
(United States) Rubell	3	1	1
(United Kingdom) Wilson	5	6	6	6
(Canada) Willey	7	2	4	2
(United States) Lesch	6	6	6
(United States) Hobbs	3	3	4

Second round
3	(Sweden) Davidson	4	7	6	11	6
(United States) Quillian	6	5	4	13	4
(Canada) Rochon	1	2	1
(United States) Dell	6	6	6
(Australia) Mark	2	5	3
(United States) MacKay	6	7	6
(United Kingdom) Wilson	6	3	6	6
(United States) Lesch	1	6	1	4

Third round
3	(Sweden) Davidson	6	6	6
(United States) Dell	4	2	2
(United States) MacKay	5	12	3	10
(United Kingdom) Wilson	7	10	6	12

Fourth round
3	(Sweden) Davidson	5	7	6	6
(United Kingdom) Wilson	7	5	3	2

==== Section 8 ====
First round
5	(Australia) Fraser	6	6	6
(United States) Estin	1	0	0
(Canada) Bedard	6	4	6	7
(United States) Andrews	3	6	2	5
(United States) Mayne	7	6	6
(United States) Mendel	5	2	0
(United States) Brechner	6	6	6
(United States) Meyer	3	2	0
(United States) Shaffer	6	6	6
(United States) Moglen	3	1	3
(United States) Noble	6	6	6
(Canada) Harit	3	4	1
(United States) Thompson	6	6	8
(United States) Freeman	1	1	6
(United States) Stewart	6	6	6
(United States) Trevenen	3	3	1

Second round
5	(Australia) Fraser	3	6	6	6
(Canada) Bedard	6	3	4	2
(United States) Mayne	6	6	6
(United States) Brechner	1	4	2
(United States) Shaffer	6	8	6	6
(United States) Noble	8	6	3	3
(United States) Thompson	7	6	6
(United States) Stewart	5	3	4

Third round
5	(Australia) Fraser	3	7	4
(United States) Mayne	6	9	6
(United States) Shaffer	5	10	4	4
(United States) Thompson	7	8	6	6

Fourth round
(United States) Mayne	7	6	6
(United States) Thompson	5	3	4

Preceded by 1957 Wimbledon Championships – Men's singles	Grand Slam men's singles	Succeeded by 1958 Australian Championships – Men's singles
