= 1955 French Championships – Men's singles =

Men's singles
- 1955 French Championships

Final
- Champion: (United States) Tony Trabert
- Runner-up: (Sweden) Sven Davidson
- Score: 2–6, 6–1, 6–4, 6–2

Details
- Draw: 116
- Seeds: 16

Events
Singles	men	women
Doubles	men	women
- French Championships

First-seeded Tony Trabert defeated Sven Davidson 2–6, 6–1, 6–4, 6–2 in the final to win the men's singles tennis title at the 1955 French Championships.

== Seeds ==
The seeded players are listed below. Tony Trabert is the champion; others show the round in which they were eliminated.

1. (United States) Tony Trabert (champion)
2. (United States) Vic Seixas (quarterfinals)
3. (United States) Budge Patty (quarterfinals)
4. (United States) Ham Richardson (semifinals)
5. (United States) Art Larsen (fourth round)
6. (Argentina) Enrique Morea (fourth round)
7. (Italy) Giuseppe Merlo (semifinals)
8. (Australia) Mervyn Rose (quarterfinals)
9. (Poland) Władysław Skonecki (fourth round)
10. (Belgium) Philippe Washer (fourth round)
11. (Sweden) Sven Davidson (final)
12. (United States) Herbert Flam (quarterfinals)
13. (France) Paul Rémy (fourth round)
14. (Belgium) Jacques Brichant (fourth round)
15. (Denmark) Kurt Nielsen (fourth round)
16. (Chile) Luis Ayala (fourth round)

== Draw ==
=== Key ===
- Q = Qualifier
- WC = Wild card
- LL = Lucky loser
- r = Retired

=== Finals ===
Quarterfinals
1	(United States) Tony Trabert	6	3	6	6
8	(Australia) Mervyn Rose	2	6	3	0
4	(United States) Ham Richardson	6	4	6	6
12	(United States) Herbert Flam	3	6	1	3
11	(Sweden) Sven Davidson	7	10	6
3	(United States) Budge Patty	5	8	0
7	(Italy) Giuseppe Merlo	12	6	6
2	(United States) Vic Seixas	10	3	3

Semifinals
1	(United States) Tony Trabert	6	2
4	(United States) Ham Richardson	1	2^{r}
11	(Sweden) Sven Davidson	6	6	6
7	(Italy) Giuseppe Merlo	3	3	2

Final
1	(United States) Tony Trabert	2	6	6	6
11	(Sweden) Sven Davidson	6	1	4	2

=== Earlier rounds ===
==== Section 1 ====
First round
(Germany) Huber	0	1	4
(France) Grinda	6	6	6
(Argentina) Russell	6	3	6	6
(France) Pellizza	4	6	2	3

Second round
1	(United States) Trabert	6	6	6
(Sweden) Stockenberg	2	1	3
(South Africa) Vermaak	12	6	6
(Denmark) Hoejberg	10	1	2
16	(Chile) Ayala	6	8	6
(United States) Brose	1	6	1
(France) Grinda	6	6	3	5	6
(Argentina) Russell	2	4	6	7	2

Third round
1	(United States) Trabert	2	6	6	6
(South Africa) Vermaak	6	4	3	4
16	(Chile) Ayala	7	6	6
(France) Grinda	5	0	0

Fourth round
1	(United States) Trabert	6	6	6
16	(Chile) Ayala	2	4	1

==== Section 2 ====
First round
8	(Australia) Rose	6	6	6
(Monaco) Borghini	4	3	4
(Canada) Fontana	6	6	7
(United States) Van Voorhees	2	4	5
(France) Lasry
(Poland) Licis
(Italy) Jacobini	0	2	6	6	6
(Belgium) Devroe	6	6	4	4	4
9	(Poland) Skonecki
(Hungary) Gulyás
(France) Haillet	6	6	6
(United States) Breese	1	2	0
(Italy) Bergamo	3	6	6	6
(France) Desq	6	2	3	4
(France) Jauffret
(United Kingdom) Wilson

Second round
8	(Australia) Rose	6	6	7
(Canada) Fontana	3	3	5
(France) Lasry	6	6	3	4
(Italy) Jacobini	3	2	6	6
9	(Poland) Skonecki	6	6	6
(France) Haillet	2	4	2
(Italy) Bergamo	1	8	5	1
(United Kingdom) Wilson	6	6	7	6

Third round
8	(Australia) Rose	6	6	2	6
(Italy) Jacobini	3	4	6	2
9	(Poland) Skonecki	6	6	6
(United Kingdom) Wilson	4	4	2

Fourth round
8	(Australia) Rose	6	7	9
9	(Poland) Skonecki	2	5	7

==== Section 3 ====
First round
4	(United States) Richardson	6	6	6
(France) Bergerat	2	3	4
(Netherlands) Van Meegeren	3	3	6
(France) Perreau-Saussine	6	6	8
(Socialist Federal Republic of Yugoslavia) Jagec
(France) De Kermadec
(France) Rinderknech	2	1	6	2
(South Africa) Forbes	6	6	3	6
13	(France) Rémy
(Switzerland) Christ
(France) Berthet	2	1	0
(Germany) Feldbausch	6	6	6
(Italy) Fachini	6	6	6
(France) Loyau	2	1	1
(France) Mey
(United States) Vincent

Second round
4	(United States) Richardson	6	6	6
(France) Perreau-Saussine	2	0	2
(France) De Kermadec	1	2	3
(South Africa) Forbes	6	6	6
13	(France) Rémy	10	6	6
(Germany) Feldbausch	8	2	3
(Italy) Fachini	6	6	6
(France) Mey	2	0	1

Third round
4	(United States) Richardson	4	2	6	9	6
(South Africa) Forbes	6	6	2	7	2
13	(France) Rémy	4	6	4	6	9
(Italy) Fachini	6	3	6	4	7

Fourth round
4	(United States) Richardson	6	8	6
13	(France) Rémy	0	6	2

==== Section 4 ====
First round
5	(United States) Larsen
(Canada) Platt
(France) Destremau	9	6	6
(Argentina) Della Paolera	7	3	4
(France) Grandet	6	0	3	7	2
(France) Abdesselam	3	6	6	5	6
(Italy) Sirola	6	6	10
(France) Weiss	4	0	8
12	(United States) Flam
(Australia) Arkinstall
(United Kingdom) Knight
(United States) Fox
(France) Favieres
(Hungary) Ádám-Stolpa
(United States) Schwartz	6	6	6
(Socialist Federal Republic of Yugoslavia) Panajotovic	2	4	0

Second round
5	(United States) Larsen	4	11	7	7
(France) Destremau	6	9	5	5
(France) Abdesselam	6	2	5	7
(Italy) Sirola	4	6	7	9
12	(United States) Flam	6	6	6
(United Kingdom) Knight	3	0	3
(France) Favieres	4	3	0
(United States) Schwartz	6	6	6

Third round
5	(United States) Larsen	2	6	6	6
(Italy) Sirola	6	1	3	4
12	(United States) Flam	6	6	6
(United States) Schwartz	4	4	2

Fourth round
5	(United States) Larsen	6	6	7
12	(United States) Flam	8	8	9

==== Section 5 ====
First round
(Hungary) Asbóth
(France) Guilbert
(France) Nys	6	6	6
(France) Gourovitch	2	3	3
(France) Laval	5	2	2^{r}
(France) Molinari	7	6	4
(United States) Fleitz	2	3	3
11	(Sweden) Davidson	6	6	6
(South Africa) Wright	1	6	6	6
(United States) Beale Jr.	6	8	3	8
(France) Thomas	0	2	4
(Australia) Worthington	6	6	6
(France) Schaff	6	6	2	5	3
(Germany) Pottinger	2	4	6	7	6
(United States) Macy	7	1	3
6	(Argentina) Morea	9	6	6

Second round
(France) Guilbert
(France) Nys
(France) Molinari	8	0	6	4
11	(Sweden) Davidson	10	6	4	6
(United States) Beale Jr.	2	2	0
(Australia) Worthington	6	6	6
(Germany) Pottinger	2	1	4
6	(Argentina) Morea	6	6	6

Third round
(France) Nys	5	1	2
11	(Sweden) Davidson	7	6	6
(Australia) Worthington	4	7	4	2
6	(Argentina) Morea	6	5	6	6

Fourth round
11	(Sweden) Davidson	6	6	6
6	(Argentina) Morea	2	3	3

==== Section 6 ====
First round
(Norway) Sturdza	3	1	6	6	3
(Socialist Federal Republic of Yugoslavia) Plećević	6	6	2	0	6
(France) Lemasson	9	5	3
(United Kingdom) Barrett	11	7	6
(Poland) Piatek
(France) Lartigue
(France) Dubuc	3	3	7
14	(Belgium) Brichant	6	6	9
(France) Hode	11	1	0^{r}
(France) Pinart	13	6	0
(United States) Manset	6	3	3	4
(France) Deniau	4	6	6	6
(Hungary) Sikorszki
(United States) Delwitt
(France) Sanglier
3	(United States) Patty

Second round
(Socialist Federal Republic of Yugoslavia) Plećević	0	3	2
(United Kingdom) Barrett	6	6	6
(France) Lartigue	0	3	2
14	(Belgium) Brichant	6	6	6
(France) Pinart	2	2	1
(France) Deniau	6	6	6
(United States) Delwitt
3	(United States) Patty

Third round
(United Kingdom) Barrett	3	6	1	2
14	(Belgium) Brichant	6	2	6	6
(France) Deniau	1	4	0
3	(United States) Patty	6	6	6

Fourth round
14	(Belgium) Brichant	3	2	6	2
3	(United States) Patty	6	6	3	6

==== Section 7 ====
First round
(South Africa) Segal	6	6	6	6
(France) Lemyze	3	8	3	3
(Italy) Maggi	6	6	6
(France) Chatrier	3	2	3
(Canada) Bedard	5	4	9
(South Africa) Seymour	7	6	11
(United States) Brent	0	1	1
10	(Belgium) Washer	6	6	6
(France) Deniau	2	6	4	4
(France) Pilet	6	3	6	6
(Germany) Biederlack	3	2	3
(Spain) Martínez	6	6	6
(United States) Stewart
(Uruguay) Motolko
(Chile) Hammersley	0	0	3
7	(Italy) Merlo	6	6	6

Second round
(South Africa) Segal	6	6	6
(Italy) Maggi	2	4	2
(South Africa) Seymour	0	4	0
10	(Belgium) Washer	6	6	6
(France) Pilet	3	1	9	6	6
(Spain) Martínez	6	6	7	4	4
(Uruguay) Motolko	2	1	1
7	(Italy) Merlo	6	6	6

Third round
(South Africa) Segal	4	2	4
10	(Belgium) Washer	6	6	6
(France) Pilet	5	4	6
7	(Italy) Merlo	7	6	8

Fourth round
10	(Belgium) Washer	2	2	1
7	(Italy) Merlo	6	6	6

==== Section 8 ====
First round
(Italy) Pietrangeli
(Socialist Federal Republic of Yugoslavia) Baco
(Venezuela) Pimentel	6	6	6
(United States) Powers	2	4	1

Second round
(Italy) Pietrangeli	7	6	7
(Venezuela) Pimentel	5	0	5
(Belgium) Mezzi	11	6	5	5	4
15	(Denmark) Nielsen	9	4	7	7	6
(United Kingdom) Becker	3	3	7	6	6
(France) Jalabert	6	6	5	4	2
(France) Malosse	2	2	0
2	(United States) Seixas	6	6	6

Third round
(Italy) Pietrangeli	6	2	9	1
15	(Denmark) Nielsen	1	6	11	6
(United Kingdom) Becker	9	4	2	3
2	(United States) Seixas	7	6	6	6

Fourth round
15	(Denmark) Nielsen	6	6	4	2	6
2	(United States) Seixas	3	3	6	6	8

Preceded by 1955 Australian Championships – Men's singles	Grand Slam men's singles	Succeeded by 1955 Wimbledon Championships – Men's singles
