= Sutton Hard Court Championships =

Defunct tennis tournament
- Event name: Rothmans Sutton Hard Court Championships
- Tour: Men's Amateur Tour (1877-1912); Women's Amateur Tour (1877-1912); ILTF Men's Amateur Tour (1913-1967); ILTF Women's Amateur Tour (1913-1967)
- Sponsor: Rothmans (1968-1977)
- Founded: 1924
- Abolished: 1989
- Location: Sutton, London, Great Britain
- Venue: Sutton Tennis & Squash Club (ST&SC)
- Surface: outdoor (clay)

The Sutton Hard Court Championships later known as the Rothmans Sutton Hard Court Championships (for sponsorship reasons) was a men's and women's clay court tennis tournament founded in 1924 and hosted by the Sutton Tennis & Squash Club (ST&SC), at Sutton, London, Great Britain that ran only until 1989.

== History ==
The Sutton Hard Courts were first was staged in 1924. In 1926 Sutton Tennis & Squash Club (ST&SC) was formally established. It continued to host the tournament that was played on 9 clay courts. It was regarded by players as a warm up event prior to French Open at Roland Garros, Paris France. From 1946 the Sutton Hard Courts were sometimes played in conjunction with the Surrey Hard Court Championships. The men's event attracted some notable players, but the women's event had the stronger fields, and attracted more leading players.

Former notable winners of the men's singles event include; Randolph Lycett, George E. Lyttleton-Rogers, Tony Mottram, Robert Bédard, Bob Howe, Byron Bertram. Other players who competed at Sutton included Guillermo Vilas losing finalist, and Mark Cox. Former winners of the women's singles title included Angela Mortimer (Wimbledon, French & Australian Grand Slam Champion ), Margaret Court, Ann Haydon-Jones, Yvonne Goolagong. Kimiko Date of Japan won the final women's event in 1989.

Sutton Tennis & Squash Club is still in operation today, in 1990 it switched to hard courts. From 2007 it hosted the Aegon British Tour Sutton Open Tennis Tournament a Lawn Tennis Association ‘Premier Status’ event. In 2015 the sponsorship arrangement with Aegon ended and the event is now called the Thomas International Open Tennis Tournament.

== Sources ==
- Atkins, Emily; Daniells, Roland (15 May 2015). "Sutton Tennis & Squash Club secures record sponsorship for 2015 Thomas International Open Tennis Tournament" (PDF). Tennis UK. Sutton Tennis & Squash Club and Thomas International.
- Current Biography Yearbook. New York, United States: H. W. Wilson Company. 1971.
- Nieuwland, Alex. "Tournament – Sutton Hard Courts". www.tennisarchives.com. Netherlands: Tennis Archives.
- Tennis Facility of The Month: - Sutton Tennis & Squash Club". tennismediagroup.com. Tennis Media Group.
