= Eastern Clay Court Championships =

Defunct tennis tournament
- Tour: USLTA
- Founded: 1927
- Abolished: 1971
- Editions: 39
- Location: Jackson Heights, Queens, N.Y. (1927-48); Travers Island (1949); Rye, N.Y, U.S. (1950–51); Hackensack, N.J. (1954-69); Port Washington, N.Y., New York City (1970-71)
- Venue: Jackson Heights Tennis Club; NY Athletic Club; Westchester Country Club; Oritani Field Club; Port Washington Park
- Surface: clay

The Eastern Clay Court Championships was a combined men's and women's international tennis tournament on clay courts founded in 1927 by the Eastern Lawn Tennis Association of the USLTA. The championships were held in various locations in the New York City area, U.S. until 1971.

== History ==
The Eastern Clay Court Championships were founded in 1927 under the aegis of the Eastern Lawn Tennis Association (the New York City regional chapter of the USLTA). That same year of 1927, the Eastern Lawn Tennis Association also inaugurated the Eastern Grass Court Championships, usually played in August. The list of champions and runners-up for the two tournaments contained many names common to both events.

The Eastern Clay Court tournaments were usually played in late June and early July, often conflicting with the Wimbledon Championships schedule for player participation and news coverage.

The early editions were played in New York City at the Jackson Heights Tennis Club, Queens N.Y..

The Eastern Clay Court Championships were later held in different locations in the New York City area including such venues as the Westchester Country Club (currently HarTru clay courts) in the early 1950s. The Westchester Country Club had also hosted the Eastern Grass Court Championships tennis tournament from 1927 until 1945.

In the 1954-1969 period the location was the Oritani Field Club in Hackensack, N.J. The Hackensack clay court traditions are currently being revived. The final venue in the early 1970s was in Port Washington, New York City.

The title was won by such champions as Herbert Bowman, Gregory Mangin, Berkeley Bell, J. Gilbert Hall, Bobby Riggs, Pancho Segura, Frank Parker (who won the title four times), Bill Talbert, Dick Savitt, Sidney Schwartz, Eddie Moylan, J. Allen Morris, Ron Holmberg, Robert Bédard, Arthur Ashe, Frank Froehling, and Antonio Palafox.

Other notable players who participated without winning the singles title but finishing as runner-up included Julius Seligson, Frank Bowden, Clifford Sutter, Sidney Wood, Don McNeill (runner-up in both 1937 and 1950), Frank Shields, Frank Kovacs, Ted Schroeder, Gene Mako, Gardnar Mulloy, Tony Vincent, and Gene Scott all of whom were strong clay court players.

Frank Parker holds the record for most titles (4). The 1969 champion, Peter Fishbach, was the son of the 1938 runner-up, Joe Fishbach.

Pauline Betz won the women's title at the Eastern Clay Court in 1941.

== Finals ==
=== Men's singles ===
Year	Location	Champions	Runners-up	Score
1927	Queens	(United States) Herbert Bowman	(United States) Julius Seligson	6–4, 5–7, 6–1, 9–7
1928	Queens	(United States) Gregory Mangin	(United States) Herbert Bowman	6–1, 6–2, 1–6, 6–3
1929	Queens	(United States) Herbert Bowman (2)	(United States) Edgar Dawson	6–1, 6–4, 6–1
1930	Queens	(United States) Herbert Bowman (3)	(United States) Frank Bowden	6–3, 6–2, 6–2
1931	Queens	(United States) Samuel Gilpin	(United States) Ralph De Mott	7–5, 6–2, 6–1
1932	Queens	(United States) Berkeley Bell	(United States) Lawrence Kurzrok	4–6, 7–5, 8–6, 6–4
1933	Queens	(United States) J. Gilbert Hall	(United States) Frank Shields	6–2, 7–5, 6–4
1934	Queens	(United States) J. Gilbert Hall (2)	(United States) Clifford Sutter	6–3, 3–6, 6–3, 6–2
1935	Queens	(United States) Berkeley Bell (2)	(United States) Leonard Hartman	8–6, 7–5, 6–2
1936	Queens	(United States) Bobby Riggs	(United States) John Richard Law	6–3, 6–0, 6–4
1937	Queens	(United States) John McDiarmid	(United States) Don McNeill	6–3, 1–6, 6–4, 0–6, 6–3
1938	Queens	(United States) Jeff Podesta	(United States) Joseph Fishbach	6–3, 6–2, 2–6, 6–1
1939	Queens	(United States) Jeff Podesta (2)	(United States) Marvin Wachman	6–4, 7–5, 6–2
1940	Queens	(United States) Frank Parker	(United States) Frank Kovacs	6–2, 7–5, 6–1
1941	Queens	(United States) Frank Parker (2)	(United States) Gene Mako	6–2, 6–2, 6–0
1942	Queens	(Ecuador) Pancho Segura	(United States) Ted Schroeder	7–5, 6–3, 4–6, 6–3
1943	Queens	Not held		
1944	Queens	Not held		
1945	Queens	(United States) Elwood Cooke	(United States) Sidney Wood	8–6, 6–4, 7–5
1946	Queens	(United States) Frank Parker (3)	(United States) Gardnar Mulloy	6–2, 7–5, 6–1
1947	Queens	(Czech Republic) Ladislav Hecht	(United States) Dick Savitt	6–4, 4–6, 6–0, 7–5
1948	Queens	(United States) Frank Parker (4)	(United States) Billy Talbert	6–3, 8–6, 6–2
1949	New Rochelle	(United States) Billy Talbert	(United States) Eddie Moylan	4–6, 11-9, 2–6, 6–1, 6–2
1950	Rye	(United States) Dick Savitt	(United States) Don McNeill	6–4, 3–6, 6–3, 6–3
1951	Rye	(United States) Sidney Schwartz	(United States) George Ball	6-4, 3-6, 6-3, 6-1
1952	Not held			
1953	Not held			
1954	Hackensack	(United States) Eddie Moylan	(United States) Jerry DeWitts	6–0, 6–2, 6–4
1955	Hackensack	(United States) Eddie Moylan (2)	(United States) Ron Holmberg	6–3, 6–2, 6–0
1956	Hackensack	(United States) Eddie Moylan (3)	(United States) Sidney Schwartz	6–0, 3–6, 6–0, 8–6
1957	Hackensack	(United States) Ron Holmberg	(United States) Tony Vincent	1–6, 8–6, 6–1, 6–3
1958	Hackensack	(United States) Gerald Moss	(United States) Sidney Schwartz	3–6, 7–5, 6–2, 6–2
1959	Hackensack	(United States) J. Allen Morris	(United States) Don Rubell	6–0, 5–7, 6–2, 6–2
1960	Hackensack	(Canada) Robert Bédard	(United States) Gene Scott	1–6, 14-12, 2–6, 6–4, 6–2
1961	Hackensack	(United States) Arthur Ashe	(United States) Bob Barker	6–3, 2–6, 6–3, 4–6, 6–4
1962	Hackensack	(United States) Sidney Schwartz (2)	(United States) Herb Fitzgibbon	6–3, 6–4, 4–6, 6–3
1963	Hackensack	(United States) Lex Wood	(United States) Dick Raskind	7–5, 6–2, 6–2
1964	Hackensack	(United States) Herb Fitzgibbon	(United States) David George Sanderlin	8–6, 6–1, 6–4
1965	Hackensack	Not held		
1966	Hackensack	(United States) Frank Froehling	(United States) Herb Fitzgibbon	3–6, 6–2, 4–6, 6–1, 6–4
1967	Hackensack	Not held		
1968	Hackensack	(United States) Ed Austin	(United States) Steve Siegel	6–4, 6–4, 6–2
1969	Hackensack	(United States) Peter Fishbach	(United States) Don Rubell	4–6, 6–0, 9–7, 2-1 ret.
1970	Port Washington	(Mexico) Antonio Palafox	(Czech Republic) Otokar Merunka	6–4, 9–7, 6–0
1971	Port Washington	(Mexico) Antonio Palafox (2)	(United States) Steve Ross	6–2, 7–5, 6–1

=== Women's singles ===
Year	Location	Champions	Runners-up	Score
1941	Queens	(United States) Pauline Betz	unknown	unknown

== See also ==
- Eastern Grass Court Championships
- Eastern Indoor Championships
