= Oscar Johnson (tennis) =

American tennis player (died 2019)

- Country (sports): United States
- Died: March 2019

Grand Slam singles results
- US Open: 2R (1953)

Oscar Johnson (died March 2019) was an American tennis player who was the first black person to win a United States Lawn Tennis Association (USLTA) tournament – the Long Beach Junior Open on July 4, 1948, age 17. He was honored by the International Tennis Hall of Fame in 1987, and inducted to the Black Tennis Hall of Fame in 2010.
