= Bob Ryland =

American tennis player and coach (1920–2020)

- Ryland at Xavier University of Louisiana
- Full name: Robert Hayes Ryland
- Country (sports): United States
- Born: June 16, 1920 Chicago, Illinois, US
- Died: August 2, 2020 (aged 100) Provincetown, Massachusetts, US
- Height: 5 ft 9 in (1.75 m)
- Plays: Right-handed; (one-handed backhand)

Grand Slam singles results
- US Open: 1R (1955)

Robert Hayes Ryland (June 16, 1920 – August 2, 2020) was an American tennis player and coach, known for having been the first African-American to play professional tennis. Ryland coached some of the world's top-ranked professionals, including Harold Solomon, Renee Blount, Leslie Allen, Arthur Ashe, Bruce Foxworth, Venus Williams, and Serena Williams. Ryland also taught and coached at clubs in Bermuda, Puerto Rico, St. Alban's Tennis Club in Washington, D.C., and the Mid-Town Tennis Club in Manhattan. Ryland was inducted into the Wayne State University Athletic Hall of Fame (1991), Black Tennis Hall of Fame (2009), and the Eastern Tennis Hall of Fame in 2002, where he also received a Lifetime Achievement Award in 2012.

== Early life ==
Ryland was born in Chicago in 1920. After his mother and twin brother died of pneumonia when he was a baby, his father Robert sent him to live with his grandmother in Mobile, Alabama where he helped his great-grandfather pick cotton. When Ryland was 10 years old, he returned to Chicago to live with his father and started playing tennis. Ryland attended Tilden Tech High School in Chicago, and while a student there won both the Illinois State and junior ATA singles titles.

== College years ==
After graduating from high school, Ryland received a scholarship to Xavier University, a Historically Black College and University (HBCU) in New Orleans where his college tennis career started. After leaving Xavier, Ryland served in the U.S. Army from 1941 to 1945 and after an honorable discharge, received another tennis scholarship to Wayne State University in Detroit, playing there for two years. While at Wayne, Ryland broke the color barrier by becoming one of the first black players to compete in the NCAA championships making it to the semifinals. Ryland was eventually inducted into the university's Hall of Fame.

In 1947 Ryland moved to California, where he played tennis with Pancho Gonzalez. Ryland also broke another barrier at the Los Angeles Tennis Club, when he played and lost to Ham Richardson in the Pacific Southwest Championships, 6–4 and 7–5. In 1954 Ryland was offered a scholarship to Tennessee A&I in Nashville. Ryland was a player and a coach at Tennessee and twice led his team to the small college national championships. Ryland left Tennessee with a Bachelor of Science degree.

== Later years ==
After leaving Tennessee, Ryland moved back east and became the physical education director of the YMCA in Montclair, New Jersey, but left there in 1957 to teach tennis in New York. In 1958, Ryland became the first African-American to play professional tennis when promoter Jack March brought him to the World Pro Championships in Cleveland. Ryland was paid $300 for his appearance.

During the early 1960s Ryland was in Washington, D.C., where he taught tennis to the Kennedys and Robert MacNamara at the St. Alban's Country Club. Ryland later moved back to New York City and started coaching at the Mid-Town Tennis Club, where he worked from 1963 to 1990. During his coaching career, Ryland taught and coached many professionals, including; Harold Solomon, Renee Blount, Leslie Allen, Arthur Ashe, Bruce Foxworth, Venus Williams and Serena Williams. In addition to coaching professionals, Ryland also taught several celebrities, including; Barbra Streisand, Bill Cosby, Tony Bennett, Mike Wallace, Eartha Kitt, Dustin Hoffman, David Dinkins and Mary McFadden.

Ryland lived with his partner, Nancy. He died of aspiration pneumonia at his stepson's home in Provincetown, Massachusetts on August 2, 2020, at the age of 100.

== Legacy ==
Ryland was the first black tennis player to compete in the NCAA National Championships, the first black player/coach to lead a college team twice to the small college national championships, the first black tennis player to play at the Los Angeles Tennis Club and the first African-American to play tennis professionally. He was inducted into the Wayne State University Athletic Hall of Fame (1991), the Black Tennis Hall of Fame (2009), and the Eastern Tennis Hall of Fame in 2002, where he also received a Lifetime Achievement Award in 2012. In 2019, Ryland was inducted into the USTA-Midwest Hall of Fame. Ryland also gave lectures at the Harlem Armory, the Arthur Ashe Youth Tennis and Education and the USTA Billie Jean King National Tennis Center.
