= George Stewart (tennis) =

Panama-born tennis player

- Country (sports): Panama; United States
- Plays: Left-handed

Singles

Grand Slam singles results
- US Open: 2R (1953, 1954, 1957)
Medal record
Central American and Caribbean Games
Silver medal – second place	1954 Mexico City	Men's doubles

George Stewart was a Panama-born tennis player.

Stewart, a black player, was dominant in the American Tennis Association (ATA) during the 1940s and 1950s, along with Althea Gibson from the women's bracket. A seven-time singles champion, he won his first ATA title in 1947. In 1952 he and Reginald Weir were the first blacks to compete at the U.S. national championships (modern day US Open).

A left-handed player, Stewart was a doubles silver medalist for Panama at the 1954 Central American and Caribbean Games in Mexico City and also represented his birth country at the Bolivarian Games.

Stewart played collegiate tennis for South Carolina State University (then known as South Carolina State Agricultural and Mechanical Institute).
