= Robert Bédard (tennis) =

Canadian tennis player (born 1931)

- Country (sports): Canada
- Born: September 13, 1931 (age 95) Saint-Hyacinthe, Quebec, Canada
- Plays: Right-handed

Singles
- Career record: 198-109
- Career titles: 30
- Highest ranking: 1 (1955 Canada)

Grand Slam singles results
- French Open: 3R (1954)
- Wimbledon: 3R (1954)
- US Open: 3R (1955, 1956, 1959, 1961)

Grand Slam doubles results
- Wimbledon: 1R (1954)

Grand Slam mixed doubles results
- Wimbledon: 1R (1957)

Team competitions
- Davis Cup: North American Zone and Interzone finals (1953, 1955, 1959)

Robert Bédard (born 13 September 1931) is a former Canadian tennis player and educator. He is the most recent Canadian winner of the men's Canadian Open Tennis Championships.

Bédard won three Canadian Open singles titles in 1955 (over Henri Rochon in the final), 1957 (over Ramanathan Krishnan in the final) and 1958 (over Whitney Reed in the final). Bédard won a record seven Quebec Open singles championships and two Ontario Open singles titles. Bédard won the ILTF Sutton Hard Courts or ILTF Surrey Hard Court Championships on clay at Sutton, England in 1957. That same season he won the North of England Hard Court Championships on clay at Southport, England. He won the USLTA Eastern Clay Court Championships in 1960. His career titles won was 30 tournaments, mostly on clay, in a very restricted playing career often confined to just the summer months.

Bédard was considered among the top ten clay court players in the world and was the top-ranked Canadian singles player in 11 consecutive years from 1955 to 1965. At the height of his career, he was unbeaten in 216 consecutive matches against Canadian players.

Bédard represented Canada in Davis Cup play for many years, reaching North America Zone and Interzone Finals in 1953, 1955, and 1959. During his career, he defeated No. 1 players from 21 different countries, including Australia and the U.S.

Bédard was a multi-sport athlete and was offered professional contracts with the New York Rangers ice hockey team and the Cleveland Indians baseball team, which he declined in favour of a career in academia. He became the principal of St. Andrew's College, an elite private preparatory collegiate, from 1981 to 1997.

== Tennis career ==
=== Summary ===
Born in Saint-Hyacinthe, Quebec, Bédard began playing tennis at the relatively late age of 15, and tennis was always his second sport to ice hockey. Bédard continued to play minor league ice hockey during the winter months and minor league baseball during the summer months.

Despite having a very limited time in tennis play, in many years playing tournaments only in the summer months, Bédard was an outstanding clay court player, with 30 tournament wins against many well-known clay specialists. During his career, Bédard defeated No. 1 players of many different countries, including Australia (Roy Emerson), the U.S. (Whitney Reed, Dick Savitt), Great Britain (Bobby Wilson, Mike Sangster), Italy (Nicola Pietrangeli, Orlando Sirola), Sweden (Sven Davidson, Ulf Schmidt), France (Paul Rémy, Pierre Darmon), Denmark (Kurt Nielsen, Torben Ulrich), Mexico (Mario Llamas, Rafael Osuna), South Africa (Gordon Forbes, Bob Mark), India (Ramanathan Krishnan). Bédard defeated players in the top ten of world rankings, including Dick Savitt, Roy Emerson, Rafael Osuna, Sven Davidson, Nicola Pietrangeli, Ramanathan Krishnan, Kurt Nielsen, Straight Clark, Mike Sangster, Eugene Scott, and Ron Holmberg.

== College tennis player ==
During the 1952–53 school year, Bédard attended UCLA on a tennis scholarship provided by his home community supporters in Sherbrooke, Quebec. This would be his only formal tennis coaching, and he was otherwise a self-taught player. During that same scholastic year, Bédard's fellow Canadian tennis player and later Davis Cup teammate Don Fontana was also in the UCLA tennis program on a tennis scholarship. Bédard and Fontana played against Bill Tilden and his student in possibly the final matches of Tilden's life, shortly before he died.

== Amateur ==
=== 1952–1953 ===
Bédard won the Montreal Cup in August 1952 beating Jack Spencer in the final. Bédard also won the Nova Scotia Championships that year.

In 1953, Bédard reached the semi-finals of the Quebec championships, losing in three straight sets to Lorne Main. Bédard was ranked Canadian No. 2 for 1953 behind Main.

=== 1954 ===
Bédard reached the final of the Hollywood Beach Invitational, losing in three straight sets to Gardnar Mulloy. He later reached the final of the 1954 Stuttgart Open, losing to Gottfried von Cramm. He was a quarterfinalist at the 1954 Italian Open, winning a five-set marathon over Sven Davidson despite losing the first two sets, and later losing to defending champion Jaroslav Drobný. At the 1954 French Open, Bédard defeated Xavier Perreau-Saussine in the second round in a long five-set match. The No. 1 seed for the tournament, Lew Hoad, defeated Bédard in the third round at Roland Garros in three close sets. A month later, Bédard won his first match at Wimbledon, a close four-set victory over Gordon Forbes, and also won his second-round match against Eduardo Argon. Fred Perry, who covered Wimbledon for BBC, stated that Bédard was the most complete athlete in the tournament and noted his competitive zeal in matches. Hoad, the Wimbledon No. 2 seed, eliminated Bédard in the third round in four sets, Bédard winning the third set from Hoad. Bédard reached the final of the Quebec Open championships, where he lost a long four-set match to Lorne Main. Bédard was ranked Canadian No. 2 for 1954 behind Main.

=== 1955 ===
In European play, Bédard won a close five-set match against Orlando Sirola in the second round of the Italian Championships. Bédard reached the semifinal at Cannes, defeating Jacques Brichant, but lost to Władysław Skonecki. He won a close match against Nicola Pietrangeli in the Queen's Club Championships but lost in the third round to Hoad. At the 1955 Wimbledon Championships, Bédard lost in the first round to Herb Flam. In August 1955, Bédard won his first Canadian Open championship at Quebec City on clay. Bédard defeated Val Harit in the quarterfinal, Don Fontana in the semifinal and Henri Rochon in the final. Rochon had eliminated Lorne Main in the other semifinal. Bédard teamed with his Davis Cup partner Fontana to win the Canadian Open doubles title. Bédard won the Nova Scotia Championships in 1955. Bédard also beat Rochon in the final of the Quebec championships in July. He reached the third round at Forest Hills in 1955 for the first of an eventual four times, but again it was Hoad that he came up against, this time Hoad winning in three straight sets. Bédard was ranked Canadian No. 1 for 1955 for the first of 11 straight times.

=== 1956 ===
In July Bédard won the Quebec Open over Fontana in the final. He also won the Ontario Championships in July beating Paul Willey in the final. As defending champion in the 1956 Canadian Open, held in Vancouver on grass, Bédard lost in the semifinals to Noel Brown, who then defeated Fontana in the final. Bédard again reached the third round at Forest Hills, this time bowing out to unseeded American Hugh Stewart in four sets. After going out early in the next two U.S. Nationals, he would once again reach the third round in 1959, when he lost to No. 6 seed Luis Ayala. He reached the same round one last time two years later, just shy of his 30th birthday. His wins in the Ontario and Quebec championships earned him the Canadian No. 1 ranking for 1956.

=== 1957 ===
Bédard and his wife took a honeymoon tour of Europe in 1957 following their wedding, which would be his finest year with four tournament wins in singles. He won two clay court tournaments in Britain in 1957.

Bédard won the ILTF Sutton Hard Courts or ILTF Surrey Hard Court Championships on clay, the two titles played in combination that season, at the Sutton Tennis and Squash Club in Sutton, Surrey, England. Bédard defeated Oliver Prenn in the semifinal and the defending champion Bob Howe in the final, both in straight sets.

Bédard also won the North of England Hard Court Championships on clay at Southport, England at the Argyle Lawn Tennis Club, defeating Alan Mills in a straight sets final. Mills would win the event in 1959.

In the Italian Tennis Championships Bédard reached the third round but was unable to play his match against Ashley Cooper and had to withdraw. In the French Championships at Roland Garros, Bédard led Flam in their second-round match by two sets to one but lost the last two sets. Flam would reach the final before losing to Davidson. In the Kent Championships at Beckenham on grass, Bédard defeated Roy Emerson but lost in the next round to Ramanathan Krishnan. At Wimbledon, Bédard and his wife entered the mixed doubles, losing in the first round. Bédard defeated Torben Ulrich in the first round at Wimbledon in singles but lost his next match to Brichant.

Bédard won the Nova Scotia Championships in men's singles in 1957 and also won the mixed doubles title with his wife. Bédard played in the O'Keefe International at the Toronto Lawn Tennis Club on red clay in Toronto. He won three rounds and defeated Kurt Nielsen and Armando Vieira, but lost the semifinal to Sven Davidson, world No. 2 and the French Open champion for that year on red clay. Davidson defeated Budge Patty in the final.

Bédard won the Canadian Open for the second time at Montreal's Monkland Tennis Club on clay, the same venue where Santana would win the Canadian Open title over Emerson ten years later. He defeated in turn Straight Clark, Armando Vieira and Ramanathan Krishnan in a superbly played four-set final. Krishnan had beaten Bédard several times earlier that year in Britain and would win the Canadian Open in 1968. Bédard had lost to Vieira in the 1957 Quebec Open championships in a long semifinal match. Bédard also won the 1957 Canadian Open doubles title partnered by his Davis Cup teammate Fontana.

=== 1958 ===
Bédard successfully defended his Canadian Open title in 1958 in Vancouver on grass, defeating American players Glenn Bassett in the quarterfinal in four sets and Whitney Reed in the final in three straight sets. Bédard had earlier in the season lost to Reed on clay in Toronto in Davis Cup play. Reed would later win two Canadian Open singles titles.

Bédard won the Adirondack Invitation tournament at Schroon Lake, New York, defeating his fellow Canadian Davis Cup teammate Lorne Main in the final. At the O'Keefe International at the Toronto Lawn Tennis Club on red clay in Toronto, Bédard defeated Ulf Schmidt and Dick Savitt, before losing to Luis Ayala in the semifinal. In August, Bédard won the Quebec Open title beating Val Harit in the final in five sets, his 100th straight victory against Canadian players.

=== 1959 ===
Bédard won the silver medal at the 1959 Pan American Games in Chicago. defeating Mexican Mario Llamas in a five-set quarterfinal, Mexican Francisco Contreras in the semi-finals but lost the final to Chilean Luis Ayala, thus capturing the silver medal.

Bédard also won the 1959 Adirondack Invitation at Schroon Lake, New York defeating American players George Ball in the semifinal and Sidney Schwartz in the final. Bédard won the Quebec Open in August, beating Cuban Reynaldo Garrido in a five-set semifinal and Eduardo Zuleta of Ecuador in the final in three straight sets.

Bédard was defending champion at the Canadian Open, but lost his quarterfinal match with Reynaldo Garrido, who then defeated Whitney Reed in the semifinal and his own brother Orlando Garrido in the final. Bédard teamed with Fontana to win the Canadian Open doubles title and also the mixed doubles title partnering Mariette Laframboise.

=== 1960 ===
In 1960, Bédard won the USLTA Eastern Clay Court Championships held that year at the Oritani Field Club in Hackensack, New Jersey in his only appearance at the historic tournament. The event moved around the New York City area and included such venues as the Westchester Country Club (currently HarTru clay courts). Bédard defeated Eugene Scott in the final in a marathon five-set match after trailing two sets to one, a "long and tough match".

Bédard defeated Mike Sangster in the third round of the Canadian Open. He lost a long five-set semifinal to the eventual tournament winner, Ladislav Legenstein. Bédard beat François Godbout in the final of the Quebec Open in July in three straight sets. Bédard "used his experience as a Davis Cup veteran to thwart any attempted rally by his opponent in the men's Singles. His fast, all-court-game stumped Godbout..." Bédard won the Oakville Invitational at Oakville, Ontario.

=== 1961 ===
Bédard reached the semifinal of the Canadian Open where he led Whitney Reed two sets to one, but lost in a marathon five sets. Reed won the final over Mike Sangster. Bédard also won the Ontario Championships in August against John Swann. Bédard won the Oakville Invitational at Oakville, Ontario.

=== 1962 ===
Bédard won the Oakville Invitational at Oakville, Ontario defeating Don Fontana in the semifinal and Paul Cranis in the final in three straight sets. He also won the Verdun Invitational at Woodland Park Tennis Club beating Val Harit in the final.

=== 1963 ===
Bédard again reached the semifinal of the Canadian Open played at Vancouver on grass, where he lost to Whitney Reed in four sets, Reed again winning the tournament.

=== 1964 ===
Bédard won the Oakville Invitational in June over George Sokol, winner of the Eastern States Clay Court and the Middle States Clay Court, in the final in three straight sets. Bédard lost in the final of the Quebec Open in August to Ronald Holmberg. "The fair-haired Texan steadily outplayed Bédard over the clay courts of the Civil Employees' Tennis Club".

=== 1965 ===
In June, Bédard beat Godbout in the final of the Oakville Invitational tournament. In August, Bédard won the Quebec Open Championships on clay at the Montreal Monklands Tennis Club in dramatic fashion, the same clay court venue where he had won the 1957 Canadian Open. Bédard defeated Billy Lenoir in the semifinal in five sets after Lenoir had a two sets to love lead over Bédard, when many in the crowd then left the stadium. Bédard stated that at that point "I realized what I was doing wrong with my serve and my forehand, and all of a sudden it came back." He then faced defending champion Holmberg, an outstanding clay player, in the final. Bédard lost the first two games of the match to Holmberg but then won the next eight games. Late in the second set, Bédard sprained his ankle and then trailed 5 to 2 in the third set. However, he rallied and won the last three games to win the set at 8 to 6, and the match in three straight sets. Bédard stated, "I don't think that [Holmberg] was prepared for the game I was ready to give him." The following day at the Quebec City International round robin, still recovering from his sprained ankle, Bédard defeated Pierre Darmon after trailing 5 to 3 in the deciding set, winning at 10 to 8, after Darmon had twice served for the match. Darmon would eventually win the tournament. Bédard won his final match of the event over Bobby Wilson. Bédard lost to Lester Sack in three straight sets at the Canadian Open and Sack would be runner-up that year to Holmberg. Bédard returned the favour by beating Sack in three straight sets at the U.S. Open in the first round. Bédard was ranked the No. 1 Canadian player for the 11th consecutive and final time in 1965.

=== 1966 ===
Bédard came from 5-3 down in the final set to beat Godbout in the final of the Dow Invitational at La bohème Tennis Club in June. The following week he successfully defended his Oakville Invitational title, defeating Val Harit, John Powless, and Godbout in the final. He lost to Mike Belkin in the final of the Quebec Open in July. "Bédard started strongly but the toil of the three-and-a-half hour final began to show in the final set when cramps completely immobilized him".

=== 1967 ===
Bédard announced his retirement in August, having played only a limited schedule in the previous few years, usually consisting of just a few Canadian events in the summer months each year.

=== 1969 ===
Bédard won the gold medal in men's singles tennis in the 1969 Canada Games in Halifax. He defeated Don McCormick, a later Canadian No. 1 ranked player, in the Gold Medal match.

== Professional ==
=== 1970 ===
In 1970, Bédard claimed he was still retired and only entered a few events because they "fell during his holidays". He won the Quebec Open Championships, which included wins over much younger players, including Jim Boyce in a four-set match. Boyce was a later Canadian National men's singles champion (closed) and Canadian No. 1, and had already won the Western Ontario Open in that same 1970 season. In the semifinal Bédard defeated Bailey Brown, winner of multiple U.S. clay titles, and in the final Australian Ken Binns, winner of multiple Australian tennis and squash titles. Bédard was awarded the first prize money for the event. This was a record seventh Quebec Open title for Bédard.

== Seniors/veterans tennis ==
Bédard has remained active playing in senior's tennis over the years, in particular doubles with his sons.

Bédard won the Canadian National outdoor singles championship in 2006 for Age 70 players, defeating Crichton Wilson in the final.

Bédard won the Sid Stevens Senior National Tennis Championships for the 80-and-over category in 2015. His former Davis Cup team-mate, Lorne Main, won the 85-and-over category.

In 2015, Bédard participated with another Pan American Games medalist in a doubles match at a museum house which contained early tennis equipment.

== Ranking ==
Bédard was considered among the top ten clay court players in the world. At the height of his career, he was unbeaten in 216 consecutive matches against Canadian players. Bédard was the top-ranked Canadian player in singles for 11 consecutive years from 1955 to 1965. During this time he lost only once to a fellow Canadian in competition, to Reider Getz of Vancouver at the Verdun invitational in July 1964. Bédard was ranked no lower than third in Canada between 1952 and 1970. He was first ranked No. 1 in Quebec in 1953.

== Davis Cup ==
Bédard was a Canadian Davis Cup member from 1953 to 1961, and again in 1967, and had a career win-loss record of 11 and 22, 8 and 15 in singles, and 3 and 7 in doubles.

Bédard lost all three of the Davis Cup rubbers he contested in 1953. Despite this Canada did go on to face the Americans in the final of the America Group, played in Canada. Bédard and his partner Henri Rochon lost the doubles match in their quarter-final tie against Mexico, played at the Mount Royal Tennis Club; fortunately, Lorne Main won both of his singles rubbers, including the Round 4 match over Mario Llamas, which gave Canada an insurmountable 3–1 lead. (It was the last time Canada beat Mexico until 2001.) In the next round, also played at Mount Royal, Canada won the first three rubbers to seal victory against Cuba. He played his first singles match, losing the Round 5 dead rubber to Orlando Garrido in four sets. The American Group final was played at the Mount Royal Tennis Club in Montreal on grass, chosen by the Canadian Davis Cup Association, even though the Canadian players (Rochon, Main, and Bédard) were all specialists on clay, and the American team won 5–0. Bédard's match was a singles dead rubber four-set loss, this time to American Tut Bartzen.

In 1954, Canada opened with a tight tie win over Chile 3–2, again in Montreal. After Main came back from 2 sets to 1 down in Round 1, Bédard got his first Cup singles win, in straight sets over Ricardo Balbiers. Main and Paul Willey next lost in straight sets to Andrés Hammersley and Chilean star Luis Ayala. Main came through to seal victory with hard fought marathon win over Hammersley in five sets. Bédard lost the fifth match dead rubber to Ayala. Canada lost to Mexico 4–1 in Mexico City.

Canada began 1955 Cup play with an expected comfortable opening win over the West Indies. Bédard defeated Trinidadian Ian McDonald in four sets in the first match and teamed with Don Fontana to win the doubles rubber in straight sets, as Canada won 5–0. Canada next faced 1954 runner-up and eventual 1955 champion Australia in the America Group final. The tie was chosen by the Canadian Davis Cup Association to be played in Montreal at the Mount Royal Tennis Club, on grass, even though both Bédard and Main were outstanding on clay. Bédard had the unenviable task of opening proceedings against World No. 2 (amateur) Ken Rosewall, and lost the match in four sets, Lorne Main lost to Hartwig. Bédard and Fontana lost the doubles rubber in four sets as well, Fontana lost a dead rubber to Hoad in singles. Bédard's won sets were the only two sets during the tie that Canada won.

In the 1956 Davis Cup, Canada again opened with a win over the West Indies, this time in Port of Spain on clay courts, the Canadians' most successful surface, and dropping only one set. This set up an encounter with the United States in Victoria, British Columbia, with the Canadian Davis Cup Association again choosing grass courts even though the Canadian players were clay court specialists. Fontana was soundly defeated by Ham Richardson to open the tie. In the second match, Bédard won the first set against Herb Flam, 6–2, before eventually losing the match. The two Canadians then came back from dropping the first set to go up two sets to one against Ron Holmberg and Barry MacKay (tennis) in the doubles, only to lose the last two sets, and with it the tie. Bédard lost a dead rubber to Richardson in straight sets and Paul Willey gave the Canadians some consolation in winning the fifth match over MacKay.

In 1957, Canada played just one Cup tie, losing 2–3 to Brazil in Montreal. Bédard played the opening match and twice came from a set down against Carlos-Alberto Fernandes only to lose the close fifth set. Fontana squared matters in winning the second match over Armando Vieira, also in five sets. In the crucial doubles rubber, Fernandes and Viera proved too good, winning in four. Fontana then went down in straight sets in the fourth match.

Canada started the 1958 campaign superbly, playing at home on clay in Toronto, sweeping aside Cuba without conceding more than 4 games in any set. At the same venue, the Toronto CS & C Club on clay, they next faced the Americans. Canada managed to win just two sets. Fontana was soundly beat by MacKay, one, two, and five. Bédard played Whitney Reed closer but also went down in straight sets. He and Fontana then lost the doubles in straight sets as well. The U.S. went on to retake the Cup in the finals from holders Australia.

The following year after an opening round bye, Canada faced Australia in Montreal in the group final. The Canadian Davis Cup Association selected a grass surface to host the tie, although Bédard was a clay specialist. The Australians fielded a team featuring three future icons: Roy Emerson, Rod Laver, and Neale Fraser. Canada won only two sets in two dead rubbers. Fontana lost the first singles match against Emerson. Next Bédard lost to Laver, receiving the only foot fault in his career while serving at 5-6 and 15–30 in the first set. (The official was a French Canadian.) Australia then won the tie by taking the doubles rubber, with Emerson and Fraser defeating Fontana and Bédard. In consolation, Bédard and François Godbout had taken the first sets off of Emerson and Laver in the last two matches.

Canada played just one tie in 1960, an opening round loss, once more to the United States by a score 0 matches to 5 score. On clay in Quebec City this time, Bédard started well, winning the first two sets against Tut Bartzen. Fontana took only 6 games off of Barry MacKay in the second match. The two Canucks made a stand in the first set of the doubles taking it to 12 games all before succumbing and losing the next two sets handily. Bédard won Canada's third set of the tie in the fourth match.

In 1961, Canada once more lost in the first round of Cup competition – they would not win a Cup tie again in fact until 1966. The tie was held at Civil Employees Tennis Club, Quebec City on clay, and Bédard was certainly not at fault for the loss to Mexico as he won the opening rubber over Mario Llamas – as well as his second singles match, a dead rubber, over Rafael Osuna in four sets. François Godbout did not fare as well, losing both of his singles matches. The two Quebeckers played a very close doubles match but came up just short in what would prove to be the decisive encounter.

After six years absent from play, Bédard returned for a 1967 tie versus Great Britain, played in Bournemouth on shale. (From 1966 through 1969 Canada competed in the Europe Group.) Young Canadian star Belkin got proceedings off well for the visitors defeating Mike Sangster in four sets. In the second match Bédard twice won a set to level before losing to Roger Taylor in the fifth 5–7. Belkin and Keith Carpenter then battled Taylor and Bobby Wilson to a 12–10 fifth set, which they lost. At one point, the Canadian doubles team had led two sets to love and 5–2 in the third, Carpenter missing a high volley. In the fifth set the Canadian team held five match points, some of them on serve. Belkin started very strongly against Taylor in the fourth match, winning the first two sets by a 6–2 score and holding four match points against Taylor. The home player however came back to win the final three sets of a close match. Bédard then lost the fifth match dead rubber to Sangster.

In March 2023, Bédard acclaimed the Canadian Davis Cup victory in 2022 as the greatest win in Canadian tennis history.

== Playing style and assessment ==
Bédard was a natural, muscular multi-sport athlete, whose excellence in baseball and ice hockey led to contract offers from professional teams, including the New York Rangers ice hockey team and the Cleveland Indians baseball team. Fred Perry stated that Bédard was the most complete athlete in the 1954 Wimbledon tournament and noted his competitive zeal in matches.

He received only one season of tennis coaching, at UCLA. His academic career left little time for tennis practice, most of which was with his wife and children at his home backyard courts. His wife and sons were excellent players.

His playing style was described by Lucien Laverdure, a racket ace also inducted into the Quebec Sports Hall of Fame in 1991, in his book "Tennis Mon Obsession", published around 1965: "[Bédard's] dominant qualities of determination, patience, strength, control, combined with an extraordinary sense of anticipation led him straight to the goal he had set for himself and far beyond".

Laverdure later remarked in a 2012 assessment, "One of Bédard's competitors, Don Fontana, stated that his physical conditioning was most remarkable: he spoke of rare speed (Bédard ran the 100 meters in 10.3 seconds!), and of superb eye-hand co-ordination, and of intense concentration. It is through perseverance and motivation that Robert Bédard will succeed in triumphing in tennis: he will never have enough time to perfect his technique and bring it up to the level of European or American players who were training at the year long. A bit like Rafael Nadal, Bédard excelled more on clay and exhausted his opponents: I am not comparing his level of play here to that of the Spaniard but rather trying to highlight his qualities as a player."

Laverdure further referenced that "Raymond Summers, a Toronto journalist wrote (1956) that it would have been better for [Bédard] to spend a few seasons working on his shots than to engage in international competitions, referring to a lack of technique to deal with this elite level. He will add that Bédard had to compensate with exhausting work combined with great determination and enormous perseverance to achieve his goals. In short, we can conclude that Robert Bédard played instinctively and that he was above all motivated by his desire to win; if he had had the chance to perfect his basic skills, he could have performed at another level and who knows, reached heights that Canadian players still dream of. It must be admitted all the same that it shows the psychological nature of [his] character in addition to illustrating what type of man he was in life, outside of sports practice."

== Tennis executive ==
Bédard served as the president of Tennis Quebec from 1967 to 1970 and the vice president of Tennis Canada from 1973 to 1977.

== Honours ==
Bédard was awarded the Queen's Jubilee Prize in 1977. He was inducted into the Canadian Tennis Hall of Fame and Quebec Sports Hall of Fame in 1991. He was inducted into Canada's Sports Hall of Fame in 1996. He was inducted into the Aurora Sports Hall of Fame in 2013 as an inaugural inductee.

The St. Andrew's College Bédard Athletic Centre is named after him.

== Commentating ==
Bédard was a tennis colour commentator for coverage of a round robin tournament held in Canada in 1967 and again in 1968, that featured four of the world's top amateur players. Coverage was broadcast on CBC Television. He was joined in the booth by play-by-play announcer Bob McDevitt.

== Outside of tennis/personal ==
An amateur tennis player in the days before Open tennis, Bédard has been a long-time educator, first as a French and geography school teacher at Bishop's College School in Sherbrooke, Quebec and as longtime headmaster (principal) for 16 years at St. Andrew's College in Aurora, Ontario where he and his wife Anne still live.

One of Bédard's near neighbours in Aurora was his former Davis Cup team-mate Lorne Main, who lived in an adjacent town about 15 minutes drive away. Also, Brendan Macken, the No. 1 Canadian ranked player of 1950 and 1952, was a neighbour in Aurora. Together, these three men were the No. 1 ranked in Canada from 1950 to 1965.

== See also ==
- List of Bishop's College School alumni
- St. Andrew's College, Aurora
