= Allen Quay =

American tennis player (1936–2016)

- Country (sports): United States
- Born: March 1, 1936 Brockport, New York
- Died: March 22, 2016 (aged 80) Fort Pierce, Florida
- Height: 6 ft 1 in (185 cm)

Grand Slam singles results
- US Open: 3R (1955)

Allen Quay (January 3, 1936 — March 22, 2016) was an American tennis player.

Quay, the 1954 Orange Bowl champion, was a U.S junior Davis Cup representative and ranked as high as fourth in the country in the junior tennis. In 1955 he reached the singles third round of the U.S. National Championships, losing to the fifth-seeded Eddie Moylan. He captained the University of Miami in varsity tennis.
