= New York State Championships =

Defunct tennis tournament
- Founded: 1891
- Abolished: 1978
- Location: Various

The New York State Championships was a men's and women's international tennis tournament founded in 1891. The championships were held in various locations in New York, United States until 1978.

== History ==
The New York State Championships were founded in 1891. The first edition was played at the Congress Springs Park, Saratoga Springs, New York, United States. The championships were held in the different locations including; Bay Ridge, Briarcliff Manor, Forest Hills, Harrison, Jackson Heights, Long Island, Mamaroneck, New Rochelle, Rye, Saratoga Springs and Utica.

Champions included Berkeley Bell, Frank Shields, Frank Parker, Don McNeill, Bill Talbert, Dick Savitt, Bill Tully, Sidney Schwartz, Tony Vincent, Allen Morris.
