= Lorne Main =

Canadian tennis player

- Country (sports): Canada
- Born: July 9, 1930
- Died: October 14, 2019 Age: 89

Singles
- Career record: 123–75
- Career titles: 12
- Highest ranking: 1 (over 70) (2000)

Grand Slam singles results
- French Open: 3R (1954)
- Wimbledon: 3R (1954)
- US Open: 3R (1954)

Lorne Main (July 9, 1930 – October 14, 2019) was a Canadian world-class amateur tennis player who competed in 11 Grand Slam tournaments in singles. Main was ranked No.1 in Canada for men's singles in 1951, 1953, and 1954. He won the singles titles of the Monte Carlo tennis championship and the Belgian Open Championships in 1954, both on red clay, and was an integral Canada Davis Cup team member during the early 1950s. Still competing competitively into his 80s, Main was highly ranked, including world No. 1, within ITF Veterans, Seniors (Masters), and Super Seniors player during the 1990s and 2000s.

== Tennis career ==
Main reached the round of 32 in singles five times in a major – at the 1951, '53, and '54 U.S. National, as well as the 1954 French Championships and Wimbledon. At Roland Garros, Main defeated his first two opponents, both Frenchmen, handily to set up a third round encounter with No. 7 seed Mervyn Rose. Rose won the first and third sets with Main drawing level twice, taking the second and fourth sets, before Rose prevailed in the fifth, 6–3. Similarly at Wimbledon, Main breezed through his first round opposition and handily won his second match before falling in five sets to his third round foe, American Gilbert Shea. At the 1954 U.S. National Championships - Men's Singles, as a result of his very solid year to that point, Main was seeded No. 18. Despite being seeded however, Main faced No. 1 seed Tony Trabert in the third round. Lorne played the World No. 1 tight in the first two sets, falling 9–11 and 6–8, before running out of steam and losing the third, 2–6.

Main was runner-up at the 1949 Canadian Open Tennis Championships, defeating the defending champion American William Tully in a close five set semifinal, but losing the final to compatriot Henri Rochon in four sets. Further singles titles that Main won include 1949 Vancouver City, 1950 British Columbia for both Lawn (an ILTF tournament) and Clay Courts, 1950 Western Canada Lawn, 1951 Quebec Indoor, 1948 and 1951 Ontario Championships, and the 1953 Quebec Open where he defeated fellow Davis Cup teammate Robert Bédard in the final.

He won four prominent clay court tournaments in 1954, which would be his finest season: the Quebec Championships (defeating Robert Bédard in a long final), the Florida West Coast at St. Petersburg (defeating Gil Shea and Tony Vincent), the Belgian Championships in Brussels (defeating strong clay court players Irvin Dorfman and Ramanathan Krishnan), and Monte Carlo over Bobby Wilson, Paul Rémy, Władysław Skonecki (the winner in 1953 and 1955) in a four set semifinal, and Tony Vincent in a four-set final. He is the only Canadian man ever to win a singles event at one of the events currently part of the ATP Masters series other than the Canadian Championships. Of his victory at the Monte Carlo, Main stated that "I missed Princess Grace by two years" but was awarded the trophy with a handshake by Prince Rainier, and spent the 20 francs prize money in the casino.

In doubles, he won, in 1954, Orlando with Shea, Jamaica with Harold Burrows, and Ireland with Shea.

=== Davis Cup ===
In the Davis Cup, Main compiled a win-lose record of 14 and 14. Canada did not progress beyond the America Zone Final stage during Main's time, losing either to the United States or Australia in that round. Main failed to defeat an American or Australian opponent in eleven rubbers.

=== Rankings ===
He was ranked No. 1 in B.C. in 1949. Main was ranked No. 1 in Canada in 1951, 1953 and 1954, in the latter two years ahead of Bédard at No. 2, and No. 2 in 1952 behind Brendan Macken. Macken was Canadian No. 1 in 1950 and 1952, while Bédard would hold the Canada No. 1 spot from 1955 to 1965.

He was ranked World No. 3 by the ITF in the over-80 category, and No. 40 in the over-75 bracket. In 2000, he was World No. 1 in the over-70 category. In October 2010, Main captured the 80 and over world singles championship, his 12th overall. He also took the doubles title, partnering longtime super seniors partner Ken Sinclair.

=== Honours ===
Main was inducted into the British Columbia Sport Hall of Fame in 1975 and the Canadian Tennis Hall of Fame in 1991.

Main was credited by tennis historian Bud Collins as the first player to use two hands on both forehand and backhand. In his senior tennis career, he switched to one hand for both forehand and backhand.

Such was Main’s on-court prowess as a senior player, he is one of only four recipients of the ITF Outstanding Achievement Award in Seniors Tennis. Indeed, he was the first, with his accomplishments honoured in 2012.

== Squash ==
Main was a keen squash player and became a four-time consecutive Canadian doubles champion in the early 1960s, partnering David Pemberton-Smith.

== Personal ==
Main was born in Vancouver, British Columbia in July 1930. He was a resident of King City, Ontario, residing not far from his former Davis Cup team-mate Bédard, but spent his winters in Florida. He attended UC Berkeley on a tennis scholarship but stayed only two semesters before dropping out.

Main married his late wife Ivy in 1951 at the age of 21. He was a recovered alcoholic, having also lost his wife to health problems attributed to her own alcoholism. He worked in newspaper and magazine advertising after leaving the amateur tour in the mid-1950s.

In 2016, Main married Adrienne Avis, an Australian tennis player he met at the World Championships in Austria in 2010.

Main died in Vancouver in October 2019 at the age of 89.
