= Don Platt =

Canadian tennis player (1930 – 2020)

- Full name: Donald Platt
- Country (sports): CAN
- Born: 5 June 1930; Toronto, Ontario, Canada
- Died: 27 May 2020 (age 89); Toronto, Ontario, Canada
- Turned pro: 1948 (Amateur Circuit)
- Retired: 1962

Singles
- Career record: 46–65
- Career titles: 1

Grand Slam singles results
- French Open: 1R (1955)
- US Open: 2R (1955)

Donald Platt (5 June 1930 – 9 April 2020) was a Canadian tennis player and later tennis writer for the Toronto Star. He was active from 1948 to 1963 and won 1 career singles title.

== Career ==
Donald Platt was born in Toronto, Ontario, Canada on 5 June 1930. In major competitions he competed at the U.S. National Championships in 1953, 1955 and 1956 and the French Championships in 1955. He won his one and only singles title in 1953 at the Toronto District Championships against Beau Summers.

In addition he was a finalist at the Leaside Invitation in 1954 against Jim Bentley, and the Toronto District Championships again in 1955. In 1960 he reached his last tournament final at the Ontario International Championships losing to Donald Fontana.

He played his last singles event in 1962 at the province of Quebec Championships. Following his retirement he was working as a tennis writer for the Toronto Star in the early 1970s.
