= John Barrett (tennis) =

Former tennis player, TV commentator and author

John Barrett MBE
- Full name: John Edward Barrett
- Country (sports): United Kingdom
- Born: 17 April 1931 (age 95) Mill Hill, London
- Height: 6 ft 1 in (1.85 m)
- Plays: Left-handed
- Int. Tennis HoF: 2014 (member page)

Singles
- Career record: 167–149 (52.8%)
- Career titles: 5

Grand Slam singles results
- Australian Open: 2R (1955)
- French Open: 3R (1955, 1961)
- Wimbledon: 3R (1953, 1954, 1955, 1958)
- US Open: 3R (1953)

Grand Slam doubles results
- Australian Open: 2R (1955)
- Wimbledon: 3R (1956)

Grand Slam mixed doubles results
- Wimbledon: QF (1960, 1961, 1966)

John Edward Barrett, MBE (born 17 April 1931) is a British retired tennis player, television commentator and author.

== Biography ==
He was born in Mill Hill, North West London, the son of Alfred Edward Barrett, a leaf tobacco merchant, and Margaret Helen Barrett (née Walker). He had one sister, Irene Margaret Leppington (1925–2009), a research chemist. His father had the rare distinction of having played both for Leicester Tigers RFC as a wing three-quarter and for Leicester Fosse FC (the former Leicester City) as a wing half.

Educated at University College School in Hampstead, Barrett was a prominent British junior tennis player and won the National Schoolboy title in 1948. He also played three years of junior country rugby for Middlesex, captaining an unbeaten team in his last year. He was twice the Royal Air Force tennis champion during his period of National Service which he completed before going to St. John's College, Cambridge (1951–1954), where he gained an honours degree in history. He represented Cambridge in three winning years against Oxford, captaining the team in his last year, and twice represented Oxford and Cambridge in the biennial match against Harvard and Yale for the Prentice Cup, winning in 1952 and losing in 1954.

He went on to compete at Wimbledon for eighteen years from 1951, reaching the third round of the singles on four occasions and the quarter-finals of the mixed doubles three times. At his peak he was ranked as his country's fifth best singles player. His five career singles tiles wins from ten finals were at the North of England Hard Court Championships at Scarborough on clay in April 1953, the same month he won the Roehampton Hardcourt tournament at Roehampton also on clay. In September 1953 he won the Welsh Covered Court Championships at Llandudno on indoor wood courts. In April 1956 he won the Hurlingham Hardcourt tournament on clay. His last title was at the Northern Championships in Manchester on grass in May 1966.

His doubles successes included the capture of the 1953 National Covered Court title with Don Black of Rhodesia and the 1956 Asian Doubles with Roger Becker. In 1956 he became a Davis Cup player and was appointed captain of the British Davis Cup team for the years 1959–1962. Three years later he established and ran the LTA Training Squad, known as "The Barrett Boys" which set new standards of fitness in British tennis between 1965 and 1968.

In 1955 he had joined the sports equipment firm Slazenger as a trainee executive and remained with the company for 39 years, rising to become the International Promotions Director for tennis and a member of the board of directors until his retirement in 1994. During his time with the company he became the tennis correspondent of the Financial Times in 1963, a post he filled as a freelance contributor until 2006. In 1986 he joined the team that compiles the daily crossword for the pink paper and still compiles a themed crossword for each year's Wimbledon.

To mark the start of open tennis in 1968 he launched the BP International Tennis Fellowship in association with the oil company. This was a junior development programme open to all young boys and girls who had won an age-group singles title at any junior tournament on the LTA's official list of events. The following year he published "The BP Yearbook of World Tennis" to record the events of that momentous first year of open competition. In 1971 the title was changed to World of Tennis and he edited and contributed to it for the next 32 years. From 1981 to 2001, when the last issue was published, this bible of the game was also the official yearbook of the International Tennis Federation (ITF).

His other writing includes Tennis and Racket Games (Macdonald 1975) and Play Tennis With Rosewall, a coaching manual produced in collaboration with the Australian champion. Barrett also co-authored From Where I Sit, the autobiography of Dan Maskell, his predecessor as Wimbledon's "voice of tennis" for BBC Television. Barrett's monument to the game "100 Wimbledons – a Celebration" was first published in 1986 and re-published in 2001 as "Wimbledon – the Official History of The Championships". A third revised and expanded edition, "Wimbledon the Official History", was published in May 2013. An updated fourth edition was published in June 2014, which included the historic events of 2013 when Andy Murray became the first British men's champion for 77 years.

Barrett's broadcasting career with BBC Television began in 1971. Barrett began commentating on Wimbledon men's singles finals for BBC Television in the late 1970s, alongside Dan Maskell and Mark Cox. Barrett's voice was famously heard on the BBC broadcast of the epic fourth set tiebreak between Björn Borg and John McEnroe in the 1980 final. Barrett continued commentating on all subsequent Wimbledon men's singles finals up to and including 1998, with Barrett becoming the main BBC tennis commentator after Maskell's retirement at the end of 1991. David Mercer took over from Barrett for the 1999 and 2000 men's singles finals, but Barrett commentated on the 2001 and 2002 finals. From 2003 onwards, Andrew Castle has commentated on Wimbledon men's singles finals. Barrett announced his retirement from the BBC commentary box at Wimbledon in 2006.

Barrett also commentated for Channel 9, Australia (1980–1986) and for Channel Seven, Australia (1987–2007) and at various times for BSB and Sky in the UK; HBO, ESPN and the USA Networks in America; the Tennis Channel in America (2003–2006); CTV in Canada and ATV and TVB in Hong Kong. In 2007 he was awarded the MBE for Services to Sports Broadcasting. For fourteen years (1997–2011) he served as President of The Dan Maskell Trust, a charitable organisation established in 1997 to help people with disabilities to play tennis.

A member of the International Lawn Tennis Club of Great Britain since 1953, he served as chairman from 1983 to 1994, as president from 2004 to 2008 and is currently a vice-president.

A member of the All England Lawn Tennis and Croquet Club since 1955 and currently a vice-president, he served for twelve years on the Club Committee and the Committee of Management of The Championships, during which time he started to compile a complete database of every result that has ever occurred at Wimbledon, in all events. This huge task took many years to complete and can now be accessed on the club's website.

In April 1967 he married the former French, Australian and Wimbledon champion Angela Mortimer. They had a son, a daughter and four grandchildren. In 2014 Barrett was inducted into the International Tennis Hall of Fame, joining his wife. The only other married couple in the Hall is Steffi Graf and Andre Agassi.

== Awards and honours ==
- 2004 Lawn Tennis Writers Association of Great Britain Annual Award
- 2006 ATP Tour Ron Bookman Media Excellence Award
- 2007 Member of the Order of the British Empire (MBE) for his services to broadcasting.
- 2010 British Sports Book Awards (Best Illustrated Book), Centre Court: The Jewel in Wimbledon's Crown (with Ian Hewitt)
- 2014 International Tennis Hall of Fame

== Selected bibliography ==
- World of Tennis (1969–2001)
- Tennis and Racket Games (1975), ISBN 978-0-356-05093-5
- Play Tennis With Rosewall (with Ken Rosewall) (1975) ISBN 978-0-87980-305-6
- 100 Wimbledon Championships: A Celebration (1986) ISBN 978-0-00-218220-1
- From Where I Sit (with Dan Maskell) (1988) ISBN 978-0-00-218293-5
- Oh! I Say (with Dan Maskell) (1989), ISBN 978-0-00-637434-3
- 100 Wimbledons – a celebration (1986), ISBN 0-00-218220-3
- Wimbledon – the Official History of the Championships (2001), ISBN 0 00 711707 8
- Wimbledon – the Official History (2013) ISBN 978-1907637-89-6
- Wimbledon – the Official History (2014) ISBN 978-1909534-23-0
