= Surrey Hard Court Championships =

Defunct tennis tournament
- Event name: Rothmans Surrey Hard Court Championships
- Tour: ILTF World Circuit (1924-1967)
- Sponsor: Rothmans (1968-1977)
- Founded: 1914
- Abolished: 1979
- Location: Guildford; Roehampton; Sutton
- Surface: outdoor (clay)

The Surrey Hard Court Championships later known as the Rothmans Surrey Hard Court Championships (for sponsorship reasons) was a men's and women's clay court tennis tournament founded in 1919 and hosted by the Roehampton Club, Roehampton, Surrey, Great Britain. It was also staged later at Sutton then finally Guildford and ran until 1979.

== History ==
The Surrey Hard Court Championships were first staged in 1914 at the Roehampton Club. It continued to host the tournament until 1939. Following World War II it was then held at the Sutton Tennis & Squash Club, Sutton until 1950.

From 1951 through until 1979 when the championships ended the event was held either at Guildford, Roehampton or Sutton. However the men's and women's events were not always held at the same location each year. Between 1970 and 1976 the event was known as the Rothmans Surrey Hard Court Championships for sponsorship reasons.

Former notable of winners of the men's singles event include; Gerald Patterson (1919), Pat Spence, (1925), Yoshiro Ota (1929), Daniel Prenn (1935), Norcross Tilney (1936), Eric Sturgess, (1948), Kurt Nielsen (1954), Bob Howe (1956, 1962), Robert Bédard (1957), Dick Crealy (1969) and Kim Warwick (1972). The women's singles seemed to attract more notable players, former winners included; Dorothy Holman (1914), Elizabeth Ryan (1919–1921), Kay Stammers (1932–1934, 1936), Christine Truman (1957), Margaret Smith Court (1970), Evonne Goolagong (1971–1972), and Dianne Fromholtz (1976).

== Sources ==
- Australian Sports Museum Collection Online. Melbourne, Victoria, Australia: Australian Sports Museum. 24 April 1950.
- Hedges, Martin (1978). The Concise Dictionary of Tennis. London: Mayflower Books Ltd. ISBN 978-0-86124-012-8.
- Mayhew, Henry; Lemon, Mark; Taylor, Tom; Brooks, Shirley; Burnand, Francis Cowley; Seaman, Owen (1971). "Punch". London: Punch Publications Limited.
- Nieuwland, Alex. "Tournament – Surrey Hard Court Championships". www.tennisarchives.com. Netherlands: Tennis Archives.
- Player Profile: Yoshiro Ota". www.itftennis.com. ITF.
- Player Profile: Norcross Tilney". ATP Tour. ATP.
- Roehampton Club, Roehampton, London. United Kingdom.
- The Washington Post. Newspaper Indexing Center, Micro Photo Division, Bell & Howell Company. 1972.
