= Paul Cranis =

American tennis player (1935–2026)

- Full name: Paul Leonard Cranis
- Country (sports): United States
- Born: April 12, 1935 New York City, U.S.
- Died: August 11, 2026 (aged 91)
- Plays: Left-handed

Singles
- Career record: 90–83
- Career titles: 7

Grand Slam singles results
- US Open: 2R (1955, 1967)

Paul Leonard Cranis (April 12, 1935 – August 11, 2026), known as Tall Paul, was an American professional tennis player.

== Biography ==
Paul Leonard Cranis was born in New York City on April 12, 1935. A left-handed player, Cranis went to high school in Brooklyn and did not start playing tennis until the late age of 17. He went to George Washington University on a basketball scholarship but left after one year.

Cranis, who served two years in the army after college, twice made the singles second round of the U.S. national championships.

In 1956, Cranis won the Brooklyn Indoor Championships, defeating George Mandel in the semifinal. Mandel had won the New York Indoor title that same season.

In 1960, Cranis won the Seventh Regiment Armory Invitational indoor in New York City, defeating Sidney Schwartz in the quarterfinal and J. Allen Morris in the final.

In 1967 he had a win over Frank Froehling at the Southampton Invitational, New York.

In 1971, Cranis won the Eastern Hardcourt Championships in Woodbury, Nassau County, New York on Long Island. defeating Don Brosseau in the final.

Cranis died on August 11, 2026, at the age of 91.
