= Jules Cohen =

Jules Cohen

Jules-Émile-David Cohen (2 November 1835 – 13 January 1901) was a French composer, pianist, organist and teacher.

== Life and works ==
Cohen was born in Marseille on 2 November 1835. He studied at the Paris Conservatoire under Antoine François Marmontel, François Benoist and Fromental Halévy from 1847 to 1854, gaining first prizes in piano, organ, harmony, counterpoint and fugue.

In 1870 Cohen was appointed professor in charge of the choral class of the Conservatoire and in 1877 he also became chorus master and vocal coach at the Paris Opéra. He was inspector of music of the chapel of the Emperor Napoleon III.

As a composer his works included:

- Maître Claude, one-act opéra-comique, with Jules-Henri Vernoy de Saint-Georges and Adolphe de Leuven (Opéra-Comique — 18 March 1861)
- José Maria, opéra-comique in 3 acts, with Henri Meilhac and Eugène Cormon (Opéra-Comique — 16 July 1866)
- Les Bleuets, opera in 4 acts, with Cormon and Henri Trianon (Lyrique — 25 October 1867)
- Déa, opéra-comique in 3 acts, with Cormon and Michel Carré (Opéra-Comique — 30 April 1871).

Cohen died in Paris on 13 January 1901, at the age of 65.

== Sources ==
- Martin, Jules (1897). Nos auteurs et compositeurs dramatiques (in French). Paris: Flammarion. OCLC 9145330.
