= Hugh Stewart (tennis) =

American tennis player (1928–2024)

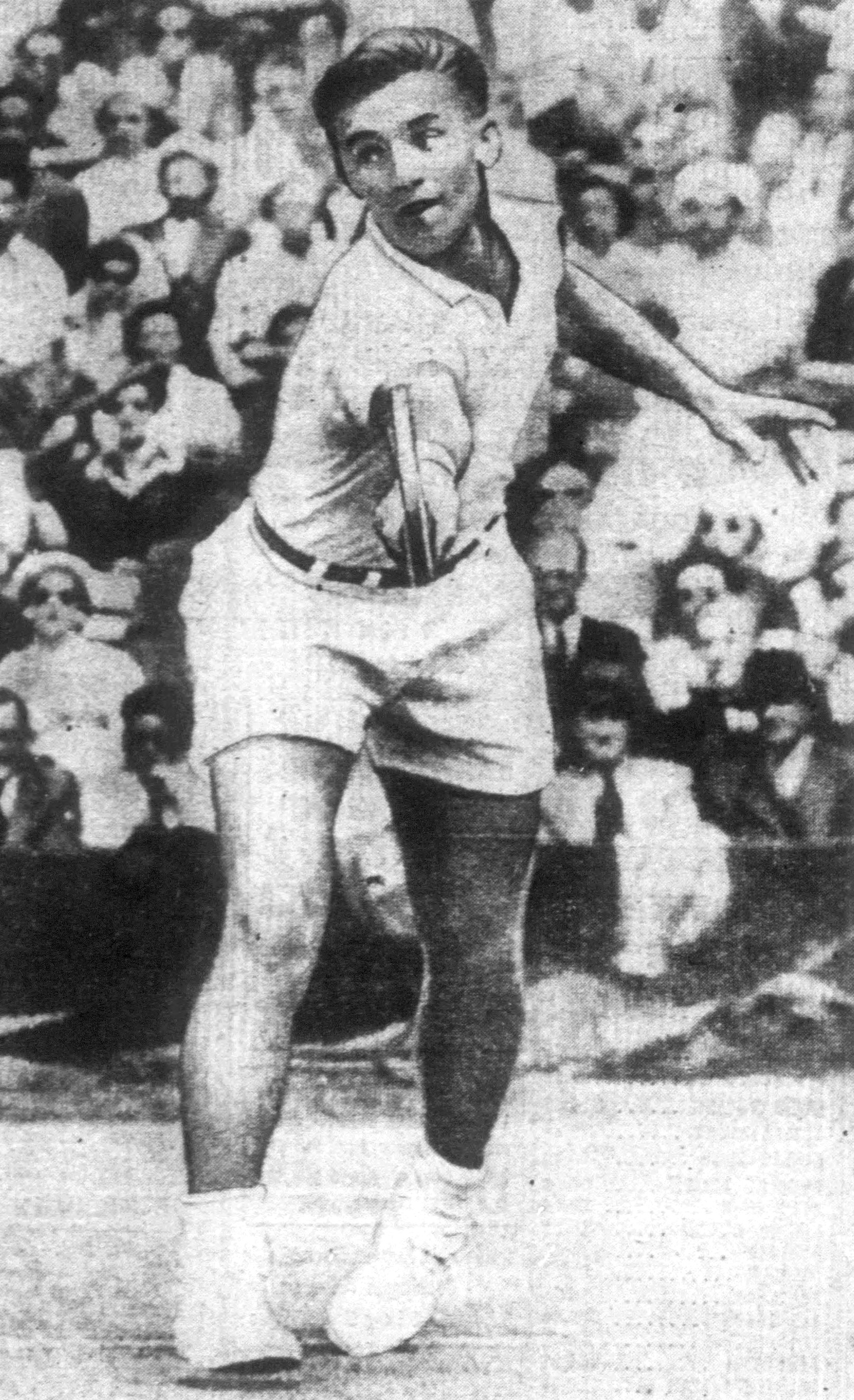
- Stewart, circa 1953
- Full name: Hugh Wright Stewart
- Country (sports): United States
- Born: May 24, 1928; Los Angeles, California, U.S.
- Died: July 19, 2024 (aged 96)
- Plays: Right-handed

Singles
- Career record: 441–234
- Career titles: 25

Grand Slam singles results
- French Open: 2R (1957)
- Wimbledon: 4R (1953)
- US Open: 4R (1956)

Doubles

Grand Slam doubles results
- Wimbledon: QF (1953, 1954)

Grand Slam mixed doubles results
- Wimbledon: QF (1955, 1956)

Hugh Stewart (May 24, 1928 – July 19, 2024) was an American tennis player.

Stewart started playing tennis aged 12 on the municipal courts in Los Angeles. As a teenager he also played basketball before deciding to focus on tennis.

He played his collegiate tennis at the University of Southern California and won the doubles title at the 1951 NCAA Tennis Championships partnering Earl Cochell and the following year won the singles title at the 1952 NCAA Tennis Championships.

At the Pacific Coast Championships in 1953 he was a doubles runner-up with Enrique Morea to Tony Trabert and Vic Seixas. In 1956 he won the title partnering Sidney Schwartz against Luis Ayala and Ulf Schmidt and three years later, in 1959, added a second doubles title, this time with Noel Brown, defeating Barry MacKay (tennis) and Bill Quillian in the final.

His best singles performance at the Wimbledon Championships was reaching the fourth round in 1953 which he lost to sixth-seeded Lew Hoad in straight sets. In doubles he made it to the quarterfinal in 1953 and 1954, on both occasions partnering Armando Vieira. At the U.S. National Championships his best singles result was reaching the fourth round in 1956 where he lost to second-seeded and eventual champion Ken Rosewall in four sets.

His level of play improved in 1954 after travelling for three months as an equipment manager with the professional group of Jack Kramer. He was a runner-up to Budge Patty at the 1954 Bavarian International Championships and won the singles event at the Northern Championships in 1955. In 1956 Stewart won the singles title at the Monte-Carlo Championships, defeating Tony Vincent in a four-sets final. Princess Grace presented the trophies at the 1956 Monte Carlo championships for the first time following her marriage to Prince Rainier. That year he also won the doubles title at the Scandinavian Indoor Championships in Stockholm together with Budge Patty.

He was a member of the United States Davis Cup team in 1952 and 1961 and won all his four matches against players from the Cuban and the Caribbean / West Indies teams respectively.

In 2011 Stewart was inducted into the Southern California Tennis Association (SCTA) Hall of Fame.

Stewart died on July 19, 2024, at the age of 96.
