= Edward Moylan =

Irish American tennis player

- Country (sports): United States
- Residence: Ithaca, New York
- Born: September 14, 1923 Trenton, New Jersey, U.S.
- Died: May 26, 2015 (aged 91) Ithaca, New York, U.S.
- Turned pro: 1939 (amateur tour)
- Retired: 1957

Singles
- Career record: 341-112
- Career titles: 40

Grand Slam singles results
- Australian Open: QF (1948)
- US Open: 4R (1946, 1947, 1951, 1954, 1955)

Doubles

Grand Slam doubles results
- Australian Open: QF (1948)

Edward Moylan (September 14, 1923 – May 26, 2015) was an Irish American tennis player in the mid-20th century. Moylan was a member of the U.S. Davis Cup Team, Davis Cup Coach and a gold medal winner at the 1955 Pan American Games with Art Larsen.

== Career ==
Moylan won the 1956 Cincinnati Open on clay, defeating Alex Olmedo in the quarterfinal, Grant Golden in the semifinal in five sets, and Bernard Bartzen, considered the finest clay court player at the time, in the final in three straight sets. He also won the Eastern Clay Court Championships three times in succession from 1954 to 1956.

Moylan's finest hour was perhaps the 1947 Spring Lake Bathing and Tennis Club singles when he brought to an end the 9-year tenure of Frankie Parker at Spring Lake. After his victory against Parker, Moylan went on to defeat Gardnar Mulloy in the final round of the tournament to win the men's singles.

After his playing career, Moylan taught tennis and was the head tennis and squash coach at Cornell University from 1962 to 1972. He died on May 26, 2015, in Ithaca, New York.
