= Clifton Mayne =

American tennis player

- Full name: Clifton Pattee Mayne
- Country (sports): United States
- Born: September 12, 1933; Alameda, California, United States
- Died: May 5, 2014 (aged 80); Walnut Creek, California, United States
- Turned pro: 1950 (amateur tour)
- Retired: 1972

Singles

Grand Slam singles results
- Wimbledon: 1R (1957, 1960)
- US Open: QF (1957)

Clifton Mayne (1933–2014) was an American tennis player. He was from California. He worked in the direct mail industry and served on the Executive board of the Direct Marketing Association. He made his debut at U.S. Championships in 1952 and lost in round three to Charles Masterson. In 1953, Mayne led two sets to love against Budge Patty in round two but lost in five sets. In 1955 he lost in round three to Vic Seixas and in 1956 lost in round two to Robert Bedard. In 1957 Mayne lost in round one on his Wimbledon debut to Seixas. At the 1957 U.S. Championships Mayne beat Neale Fraser before losing to Sven Davidson in the quarterfinals. At Wimbledon 1960 he lost in round one to Boro Jovanović.
