= Irvin Dorfman =

American tennis player

- Full name: Irvin Sherrod Dorfman
- Country (sports): United States
- Born: September 3, 1924 New York City, US
- Died: October 8, 2006 (aged 82) Raleigh, North Carolina, US

Grand Slam singles results
- French Open: QF (1950)
- Wimbledon: 3R (1950, 1952)
- US Open: 3R (1947, 1953, 1956)

Grand Slam doubles results
- Wimbledon: 2R (1950, 1952)

Grand Slam mixed doubles results
- Wimbledon: 2R (1956)

Irvin "Irv" Sherrod Dorfman (September 3, 1924 – October 8, 2006) was an outstanding amateur American tennis player in the 1940s and 1950s. He was ranked No. 15 in singles in the United States in 1947, and No. 3 in doubles in the U.S. in 1948.

== Early and personal life ==
He was born in Brooklyn, the son of Belle and Nat Dorfman, and was Jewish. During World War 2, he was in the US Navy. He was married to Eileen Merl Dorfman and Jane Randall (originally Rosenbaum), with whom he had a daughter, Andrea Dorfman. He had a younger sister, Marcia Katz. His grandparents were Jewish immigrants from Poland and Russia.

== Tennis career ==
Dorfman played his collegiate tennis at Yale University. In 1946 he won the Eastern Intercollegiate Tennis Title. He also won the 1947 Connecticut State Tournament in singles, men's doubles, and mixed doubles. He graduated from that Ivy League school in 1947.

At the Cincinnati Masters, Dorfman reached the 1948 singles final, only to fall to Herbert "Buddy" Behrens in a match that lasted 64 games: 5–7, 9–11, 6–2, 8–6, 4–6. To this day, it is the longest final in games in the history of the Cincinnati tournament, which started in 1899 and is now the oldest tournament played in its original city in the United States.

Dorfman also won the doubles title in 1948 in Cincinnati, partnering with future International Tennis Hall of Fame enshrinee Pancho Gonzalez.

Dorfman reached the quarterfinal of the 1950 French Championships in which he lost to eventual champion and compatriot Budge Patty.

He died in Raleigh, North Carolina in 2006.

== See also ==
- List of select Jewish tennis players
