= Allen Morris (tennis) =

American tennis player and coach

- Full name: J. Allen Morris Jr.
- Country (sports): United States
- Born: 9 April 1932; Atlanta, Georgia, United States
- Died: 27 February 2017 (aged 84); Greensboro, North Carolina, United States
- Turned pro: 1953 (amateur tour)
- Retired: 1971
- College: Presbyterian College

Singles
- Career record: 188-85
- Career titles: 25

Grand Slam singles results
- Wimbledon: QF (1956)
- US Open: 3R (1954, 1955)

J. Allen Morris Jr. (April 9, 1932 – February 27, 2017) was a tennis player and coach. In 1956 he was a quarterfinalist at Wimbledon where he defeated Ashley Cooper. Morris won the New York State Championships in both 1959 and 1960. He also won the Eastern Clay Court Championships in 1959.

== Tennis career ==
Morris was ranked No. 16 in the United States in 1956. That year, he was a quarterfinalist at Wimbledon where he defeated Ashley Cooper in the round of 16.

Morris won the New York State Championships in both 1959 and 1960. He also won the Eastern Clay Court Championships in 1959.

In 1964 he played an exhibition match against Arthur Ashe in Greensboro N.C. to help promote diversity & inclusion within the growing game of tennis. Morris defeated Ashe in front of a large crowd on Greensboro's Memorial Stadium Tennis Courts in two sets.

In 1977 and 1978, Morris won the U.S. Senior Clay Court Championship in the singles and doubles division and was ranked in the top ten in the world. He was also head coach of the University of North Carolina men's tennis team from 1980 to 1993. As head coach, he led his team to ACC championships in 1990 and 1992. His record as coach was 245–123.

=== U.S. Championships ===
Morris started his international tennis career at the 1953 U.S. National Championships (now US Open), where he lost in the first round to Australian Mervyn Rose in five sets. In 1954 and 1955, he reached the third round, losing to Rex Hartwig and Tony Trabert, respectively. Morris lost in the first round in 1956 to Ulf Schmidt.

=== 1956 Wimbledon ===
Morris competed in the 1956 Wimbledon tournament while still a student at Presbyterian College. In round one, Morris defeated Eric Bulmer in four sets. In round two, Morris defeated Bruce Gulley in three sets. In round three, Morris defeated F. Robin Kipping in three sets. In round four, Morris defeated Ashley Cooper in five sets. In the quarterfinal round, Morris lost to Vic Seixas in a three-set match.

=== Awards ===
Morris was inducted into the North Carolina Tennis Hall of Fame in 1976. In 2009, Morris was inducted into the Guilford County Sports Hall of Fame. He was also inducted into the North Carolina Sports Hall of Fame in 1978, the Southern Tennis Hall of Fame in 1985, the Intercollegiate Tennis Hall of Fame in 1993, the South Atlantic Conference Hall of Fame in 2002 and the South Carolina Athletic Hall of Fame in 2004.

Morris won state singles titles in multiple states and holds the record for the most state singles titles in North Carolina, having won the championships 7 times from 1958 to 1967, including 5 times in a row from 1961 to 1965.
