= Don Fontana =

Canadian tennis player

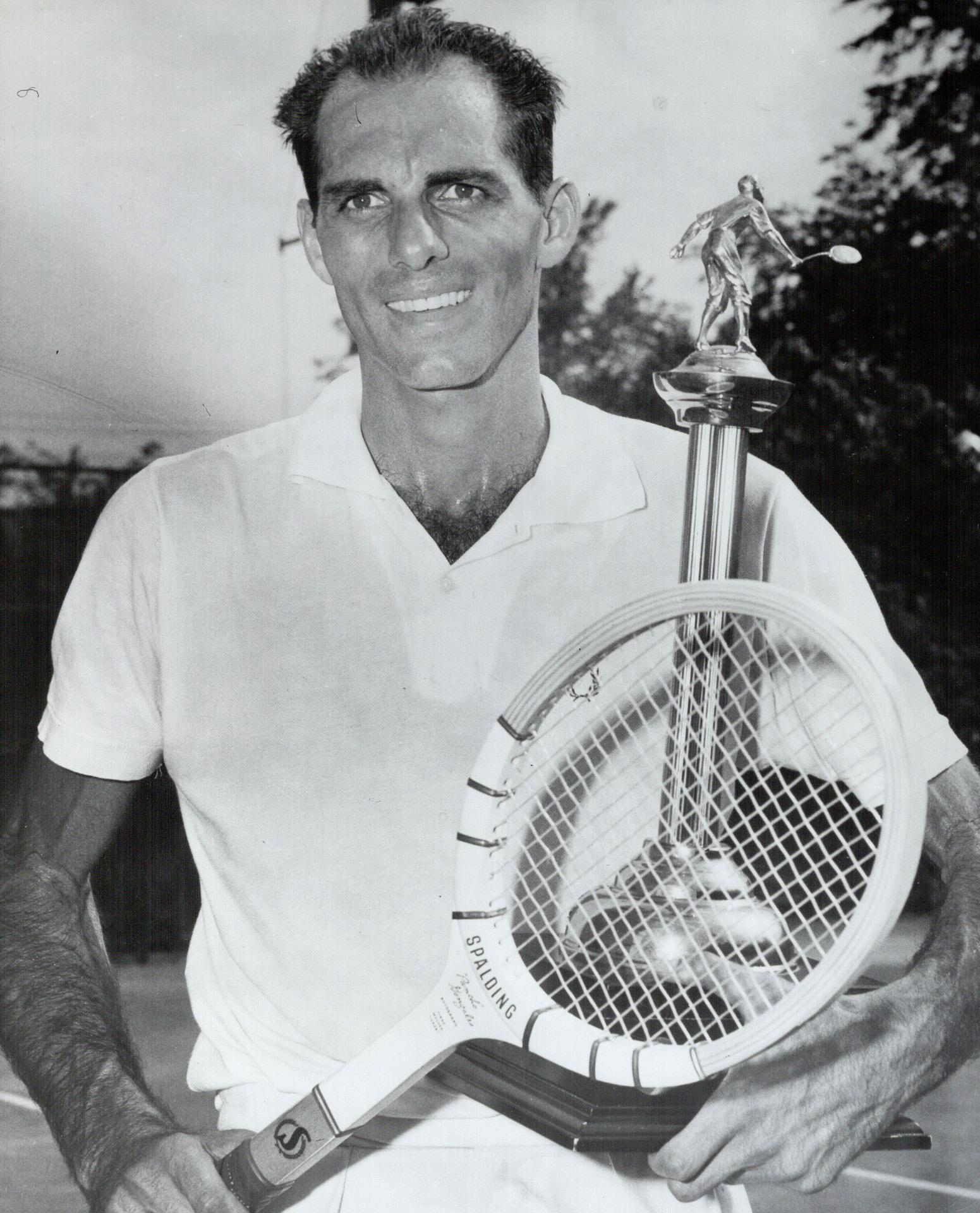
- Fontana in 1962
- Country (sports): Canada
- Born: 1 January 1931 Toronto, Ontario, Canada
- Died: 15 July 2015 (aged 84) Toronto, Ontario, Canada
- Plays: Right-handed

Singles
- Career record: 81-102
- Career titles: 6

Grand Slam singles results
- French Open: 2R (1955)
- Wimbledon: 1R (1955, 1956)
- US Open: 4R (1957)

Grand Slam doubles results
- Wimbledon: 1R (1955, 1956)

Grand Slam mixed doubles results
- Wimbledon: 2R (1956)

Donald Fontana (1 January 1931 – 17 July 2015) was a former high-ranking Canadian tennis player from the 1950s and 1960s.

Fontana was the year-ending no. 2 ranked Canadian player six times, three times in the 1950s and three more in the 1960s. He was ranked in the Canadian top-ten five more times.

Fontana was runner-up in the Canadian Open singles in 1956 in Vancouver on grass, defeating U.S. player Bob Perry in the semifinal, and losing in the men's singles final to U.S. player Noel Brown in four sets. He won the Canadian Open doubles championship three times, in 1955, 1957, and 1959 with compatriot Robert Bédard, and was a runner-up four more times.

At the 1956 Wimbledon Championships, Fontana lost in the first round to the eventual Wimbledon champion for that year, Lew Hoad. In 1957, Fontana reached the fourth round at the US Open Championships where he lost to Budge Patty.

Fontana won the Ontario Open singles tennis championship three times at the Boulevard Club on clay in Toronto. In 1957, he defeated Henri Rochon and Paul Willey in the final two rounds. He also won the Ontario Championships in 1958 and 1960 at the Boulevard Club. He was a Pan American Games competitor twice, in 1959 and 1963.

Fontana represented Canada in Davis Cup eight times from 1955 to 1963 and had a career win-lose record of 7 and 15, 4 and 8 in singles and 3 and 7 in doubles. He was Canadian Davis Cup captain five times between 1963 and 1976.

Fontana was tournament director of the Canadian Open in 1959 and from 1971 to 1978. He was also a long-time tennis TV analyst for CTV's coverage of the Canadian Open.

Fontana was inducted into the Tennis Canada Hall of Fame in 2000.

Fontana is also one of the last people to have played tennis with the legendary Bill Tilden. According to Frank Deford's authoritative biography of Tilden, ("Big Bill Tilden", at pp. 273–74) in 1953 Fontana and Bédard, while on tennis scholarships at UCLA, were invited by Tilden to play tennis with him and Tilden's protégé Art Anderson on Charlie Chaplin's tennis court in Los Angeles in a mock-Davis Cup format of the U.S. versus Canada (the Canadians won both the first two singles and the doubles for an insurmountable 3–0 lead). Tilden, age 60 then, was found dead in his apartment a few days later on the eve of his proposed departure for the U.S. Pro Championships in Cleveland, Ohio.

Fontana died in Scarborough, Ontario 17 July 2015.
