= Tony Vincent (tennis) =

American tennis player

- Country (sports): United States
- Born: September 17, 1925 The Bronx, New York, U.S.
- Died: March 10, 2023 (aged 97) Miami, Florida, U.S.

Singles
- Career record: 316–153
- Career titles: 42

Grand Slam singles results
- French Open: 3R (1954)
- Wimbledon: 3R (1954)
- US Open: 4R (1957)

Anthony DeVincenzo (September 17, 1925 – March 10, 2023), better known as Tony Vincent, was an American amateur tennis player. He won the Canadian National Championships title in 1951 on clay, and was runner-up at the Monte Carlo on red clay in 1954 and 1956. He won the New York State Championships at Bayside, Queens, New York City on clay in 1958 and again in 1965.

== Biography ==
Tony Vincent was born on September 17, 1925, in The Bronx, New York, and grew up in Elmhurst, a neighbourhood of Queens. His father Salvatore, a classical musician, played trombone for the famed Metropolitan Opera of New York.

An Air Force bombardier during the war, Vincent was most productive on tour in the 1950s.

Vincent won the Canadian National Championships title in 1951 on clay at Windsor, Ontario, defeating Canadian clay court specialist Lorne Main in the semifinal and American clay court specialist Seymour Greenberg in the final in four sets.

Vincent twice finished runner-up in Monte Carlo on red clay, including 1954 when he lost a four-set final to Lorne Main, and in 1956 when he upset Lew Hoad in the quarter-finals. Princess Grace presented the trophies at the 1956 Monte Carlo championships for the first time following her marriage to Prince Rainier.

In 1955, Vincent won the Cannes Beau Site Championships, part of the French Riviera tennis circuit, defeating Jean-Noël Grinda in the final.

Vincent reached the fourth round at the 1957 U.S. National Championships, and won the Rhode Island State Championships the same year.

In 1958 he won the New York State Championships at Bayside, Queens, New York City on clay defeating Sidney Schwartz, a two-time winner of the event, in the final. Vincent won the New York State Championships title a second time in 1965.

Vincent continued to play senior's tennis and won the 35 years and over national title on multiple occasions.

Vincent worked as a Wall Street investor. By the 1980s, he was living in retirement after 17 years of an active career in Wall Street. He died in Miami, Florida on March 10, 2023, at the age of 97.
