= Richard Sorlien =

American lawyer and tennis player (1922–2008)

- Full name: Richard C. Sorlien
- Country (sports): United States
- Born: June 23, 1922
- Died: January 7, 2008 (aged 85)

Grand Slam singles results
- US Open: 3R (1951)

Richard Sorlien (June 23, 1922 — January 7, 2008) was an American lawyer and amateur tennis player.

Sorlien, a native of Minnesota, had his early career interrupted by World War II, in which he served with the United States Air Force. He made the singles third round of the 1951 U.S. National Championships, losing to Mervyn Rose. In 1952 he played in the men's doubles and mixed doubles main draws of the Wimbledon Championships.

A Harvard University graduate, Sorlien was a lawyer by profession and practiced at a firm in the Center City neighborhood of Philadelphia. He was on the board of the International Lawn Tennis Club of the United States and has an annual open-age competition, the Sorlien Cup, named in his honor.
