= Sidney Schwartz =

American tennis player (1929–2017)

Sid Schwartz
- Full name: Sidney Schwartz
- Country (sports): United States
- Born: May 28, 1929 Brooklyn, New York, U.S.
- Died: February 19, 2017 (aged 87) Boynton Beach, Florida, U.S.
- Turned pro: 1945 (amateur)
- Retired: 1968

Singles
- Career titles: 22

Grand Slam singles results
- French Open: 3R (1955)
- Wimbledon: 3R (1957)
- US Open: QF (1950)

Grand Slam doubles results
- Wimbledon: 3R (1957)

Grand Slam mixed doubles results
- Wimbledon: QF (1957)

Sidney Schwartz (May 28, 1929 – February 19, 2017) was an American tennis player who competed in the mid-20th century. He reached the quarterfinals of the U.S. National Championships in 1950 at Forest Hills, New York, on grass, losing to Dick Savitt. Schwartz won 22 titles in his career, including two Eastern Clay Court Championships and two New York State Championships.

== Career ==
Schwartz played his first tournament at the Eastern Indoor Championships held in New York in 1945 and played at the Bassford Wood Courts. He reached the final of the US National Indoor Championships in 1948, losing to Bill Talbert.

Schwartz won two Eastern Clay Court Championships in 1951 and again in 1962 where he defeated Herb Fitzgibbon in the final in four sets.

Schwartz won the New York State Championships in 1956 and again in 1962, where he defeated Fitzgibbon in the final in three straight sets.

In 1957 he won the East of Ireland Championships in Dublin against Isaías Pimentel.

Schwartz competed in the 1961 Maccabiah Games in Israel, losing in the third round to Israeli Eleazar Davidman.

Schwartz played his final tournament at the Long Island Championships at Great Neck, New York in 1968.

== Death ==
Schwartz died in Boynton Beach, Florida on February 19, 2017, at the age of 87.
