= 1951 Wimbledon Championships – Men's doubles =

Men's doubles
- 1951 Wimbledon Championships

Final
- Champions: (Australia) Ken McGregor (Australia) Frank Sedgman
- Runners-up: (Egypt) Jaroslav Drobný (South Africa) Eric Sturgess
- Score: 3–6, 6–2, 6–3, 3–6, 6–3

Details
- Draw: 64 (5Q)
- Seeds: 4

Events
Singles	men	women		boys	girls
Doubles	men	women	mixed	boys	girls
- Wimbledon Championships

John Bromwich and Adrian Quist were the defending champions, but did not compete.

Ken McGregor and Frank Sedgman defeated Jaroslav Drobný and Eric Sturgess in the final, 3–6, 6–2, 6–3, 3–6, 6–3 to win the gentlemen's doubles tennis title at the 1951 Wimbledon Championship.

== Seeds ==
1. (Australia) Ken McGregor / (Australia) Frank Sedgman (champions)
2. (United States) Gardnar Mulloy / (United States) Dick Savitt (semifinals)
4. (United States) Herbie Flam / (United States) Art Larsen (first round)
4. (Egypt) Jaroslav Drobný / (South Africa) Eric Sturgess (final)

Click on the seed number of a player to go to their draw section.

== Draw ==
Key

- Q = Qualifier
- WC = Wild card
- LL = Lucky loser
- Alt = Alternate
- ITF = ITF entry
- PR = Protected ranking
- SR = Special ranking
- SE = Special exempt
- JE = Junior exempt
- JR = Junior Accelerator Programme entrant
- CO = College Accelerator Programme entrant
- NG = Next Gen Accelerator Program entrant
- w/o = Walkover
- r = Retired
- d = Defaulted

=== Finals ===
Quarterfinals
1	(Australia) Ken McGregor (Australia) Frank Sedgman
(Italy) Giovanni Cucelli (Italy) Marcello del Bello	w/o
(Sweden) Lennart Bergelin (Sweden) Sven Davidson	6	6	3	7	5
(United States) Budge Patty (United States) Ham Richardson	1	8	6	5	7
(West Germany) Ernst Buchholz (West Germany) Gottfried von Cramm	3	1	3
4	(Egypt) Jaroslav Drobný (South Africa) Eric Sturgess	6	6	6
(Canada) Brendan Macken (Canada) Lorne Main	2	1	4
2	(United States) Gardnar Mulloy (United States) Dick Savitt	6	6	6

Semifinals
1	(Australia) Ken McGregor (Australia) Frank Sedgman	6	6	6
(United States) Budge Patty (United States) Ham Richardson	4	2	3
4	(Egypt) Jaroslav Drobný (South Africa) Eric Sturgess	4	6	6	6
2	(United States) Gardnar Mulloy (United States) Dick Savitt	6	4	3	4

Final
1	(Australia) Ken McGregor (Australia) Frank Sedgman	3	6	6	3	6
4	(Egypt) Jaroslav Drobný (South Africa) Eric Sturgess	6	2	3	6	3

=== Top half ===
==== Section 1 ====
First round
1	(Australia) Ken McGregor (Australia) Frank Sedgman	6	6	6
(Socialist Federal Republic of Yugoslavia) Petko Milojković (Socialist Federal Republic of Yugoslavia) Vladimir Petrović	1	1	3
(Philippines) Raymundo Deyro (United States) Gene Garrett	6	6	6
(United Kingdom) Edmund David (United Kingdom) Herman David	2	0	2
(France) Bernard Destremau (Sweden) Torsten Johansson	6	6	6
Q	(United Kingdom) Tommy Anderson (United Kingdom) Arnold England	3	3	3
Q	(South Africa) Johann Kupferburger (South Africa) Owen Williams	2	7	6	9	7
(United Kingdom) Derek Bull (United Kingdom) Stan Clark	6	9	4	7	9
(Belgium) Pierre Geelhand de Merxem (Belgium) Jacques Peten	4	4	2
(United Kingdom) Tony Mottram (United Kingdom) Geoffrey Paish	6	6	6
(United Kingdom) John Barrett (United Kingdom) John Horn	2	1	4
(Italy) Giovanni Cucelli (Italy) Marcello del Bello	6	6	6
(United States) Robert Sibert (United States) Roy Wilder	2	1	3
(United States) Hal Burrows (United States) Straight Clark	6	6	6
(Poland) Czesław Spychała (Poland) Ignacy Tłoczyński	6	3	6	6
Q	(United Kingdom) Tony Dawes (United Kingdom) JS Ross	3	6	1	3

Second round
1	(Australia) K McGregor (Australia) F Sedgman	6	6	6
(Philippines) R Deyro (United States) W Garrett	4	4	3
(France) B Destremau (Sweden) T Johansson	3	6	6	9
(United Kingdom) D Bull (United Kingdom) S Clark	6	3	2	7
(United Kingdom) A Mottram (United Kingdom) G Paish	6	1	0	2
(Italy) G Cucelli (Italy) M del Bello	3	6	6	6
(United States) H Burrows (United States) S Clark	6	6	6
(Poland) C Spychała (Poland) I Tłoczyński	1	3	4

Third round
1	(Australia) K McGregor (Australia) F Sedgman	6	3	6	6
(France) B Destremau (Sweden) T Johansson	1	6	1	2
(Italy) G Cucelli (Italy) M del Bello	6	7	16
(United States) H Burrows (United States) S Clark	4	5	14

Quarterfinals
1	(Australia) K McGregor (Australia) F Sedgman
(Italy) G Cucelli (Italy) M del Bello	w/o

==== Section 2 ====
First round
3	(United States) Herbie Flam (United States) Art Larsen	6	5	3	4
(Sweden) Lennart Bergelin (Sweden) Sven Davidson	2	7	6	6
(India) Naresh Kumar (India) Narendra Nath	6	6	7
(South Africa) FJ Bartlett (South Africa) Robert Connor	4	4	5
(South Africa) Abe Segal (South Africa) Russell Seymour	4	6	7	8
(France) Jean-Claude Molinari (France) Paul Rémy	6	8	5	10
(United Kingdom) Headley Baxter (United Kingdom) Paddy Roberts	1	6	9	6
(Federation of Malaya) Ong Chew-Bee (South Africa) David Samaai	6	3	7	4
(Czechoslovakia) Vladimír Černík (Czechoslovakia) Milan Matouš	4	12	6	6
(Philippines) Felicisimo Ampon (Philippines) Cesar Carmona	6	10	3	1
Q	(France) Philippe Chatrier (France) Michel Lemasson	2	2	6	2
(Republic of Ireland) Joe Hackett (Republic of Ireland) Guy Jackson	6	6	3	6
(South Africa) Nigel Cockburn (South Africa) Sydney Levy	0	4	5
(Netherlands) Ivo Rinkel (Netherlands) Hans van Swol	6	6	7
(United States) Budge Patty (United States) Ham Richardson	2	6	6	6
(Egypt) Marcel Coen (Egypt) Adli El Shafei	6	2	3	2

Second round
(Sweden) L Bergelin (Sweden) S Davidson	6	16	6
(India) N Kumar (India) N Nath	1	14	2
(France) J-C Molinari (France) P Rémy	6	8	6
(United Kingdom) H Baxter (United Kingdom) A Roberts	1	6	2
(Czechoslovakia) V Černík (Czechoslovakia) M Matouš	2	4	6	6	6
(Republic of Ireland) J Hackett (Republic of Ireland) G Jackson	6	6	3	2	1
(Netherlands) I Rinkel (Netherlands) A van Swol	4	4	4
(United States) J Patty (United States) H Richardson	6	6	6

Third round
(Sweden) L Bergelin (Sweden) S Davidson	8	6	6
(France) J-C Molinari (France) P Rémy	6	2	4
(Czechoslovakia) V Černík (Czechoslovakia) M Matouš	6	6	7	6	4
(United States) J Patty (United States) H Richardson	8	4	9	3	6

Quarterfinals
(Sweden) L Bergelin (Sweden) S Davidson	6	6	3	7	5
(United States) J Patty (United States) H Richardson	1	8	6	5	7

=== Bottom half ===
==== Section 3 ====
First round
(Australia) Don Candy (Australia) Mervyn Rose	6	8	8
(United Kingdom) Norman Kitovitz (United Kingdom) David Mockridge	3	6	6
(Poland) Władysław Skonecki (Argentina) Heraldo Weiss	6	7	6
(United Kingdom) Peter Anderson (United Kingdom) Dick Guise	3	5	3
(Hong Kong) Ip Koon Hung (Dominion of Ceylon) Doug Scharenguivel	6	6	6
Q	(United Kingdom) CJ Grindley (United Kingdom) Neville Hooper	4	1	4
(Denmark) Kurt Nielsen (Denmark) Torben Ulrich	6	6	3	4	5
(West Germany) Ernst Buchholz (West Germany) Gottfried von Cramm	4	4	6	6	7
(South Africa) Leon Norgarb (Brazil) Armando Vieira	3	1	7
(Australia) Peter Cawthorn (Australia) Don Tregonning	6	6	9
(France) Jean Becker (Switzerland) Gaby Mercier-Odier
(Switzerland) Jost Spitzer (Egypt) Mahmoud Talaat	w/o
(Italy) Fausto Gardini (Italy) Rolando del Bello	4	4	4
(South Africa) David Lurie (United Kingdom) Gerry Oakley	6	6	6
(United States) RM Henry (Czechoslovakia) Bohuslav Hykš	2	1	1
4	(Egypt) Jaroslav Drobný (South Africa) Eric Sturgess	6	6	6

Second round
(Australia) D Candy (Australia) M Rose	6	6	6	8
(Poland) W Skonecki (Argentina) H Weiss	0	8	4	6
(Hong Kong) K-H Ip (Dominion of Ceylon) D Scharenguivel	6	1	5	4
(West Germany) E Buchholz (West Germany) G von Cramm	3	6	7	6
(Australia) P. Cawthorn (Australia) D Tregonning	6	6	6
(France) J Becker (Switzerland) G Mercier-Odier	1	0	3
(South Africa) D Lurie (United Kingdom) G Oakley	0	8	0
4	(Egypt) J Drobný (South Africa) E Sturgess	6	10	6

Third round
(Australia) D Candy (Australia) M Rose	4	6	7	3	5
(West Germany) E Buchholz (West Germany) G von Cramm	6	1	5	6	7
(Australia) P. Cawthorn (Australia) D Tregonning	1	2	6
4	(Egypt) J Drobný (South Africa) E Sturgess	6	6	8

Quarterfinals
(West Germany) E Buchholz (West Germany) G von Cramm	3	1	3
4	(Egypt) J Drobný (South Africa) E Sturgess	6	6	6

==== Section 4 ====
First round
(United Kingdom) Peter Hare (United Kingdom) Howard Walton	4	2	3
(Austria) Freddie Huber (Austria) Hans Redl	6	6	6
(India) Jimmay Mehta (Portugal) José Roquette	w/o
(Sweden) Bengt Axelsson (Sweden) Staffan Stockenberg
(United Kingdom) Leslie Cater (United Kingdom) Francis Wallis	5	2	3
(New Zealand) Dennis Coombe (United Kingdom) Claude Lister	7	6	6
(United Kingdom) Roland Carter (United Kingdom) Douglas Snart	5	4	4
(Canada) Brendan Macken (Canada) Lorne Main	7	6	6
(Socialist Federal Republic of Yugoslavia) Milan Branović (Socialist Federal Republic of Yugoslavia) Josip Palada	6	6	6
(United Kingdom) Freddie Della Porta (United Kingdom) Harley Watkins	3	4	3
(France) Jean Borotra (France) Robert Haillet	4	4	2
(Belgium) Jacques Brichant (Belgium) Philippe Washer	6	6	6
(Belgium) Ivan Devroe (Canada) Henri Rochon
(Hungary) József Asbóth (Hungary) Antal Jancsó	w/o
(United Kingdom) Bernard Neal (United Kingdom) Tony Starte	2	4	3
2	(United States) Gardnar Mulloy (United States) Dick Savitt	6	6	6

Second round
(Austria) A Huber (Austria) H Redl	6	9	6
(Sweden) B Axelsson (Sweden) S Stockenberg	4	7	4
(New Zealand) D Coombe (United Kingdom) C Lister	6	6	6	2
(Canada) B Macken (Canada) L Main	8	2	8	6
(Socialist Federal Republic of Yugoslavia) M Branović (Socialist Federal Republic of Yugoslavia) J Palada	5	2	7
(Belgium) J Brichant (Belgium) P Washer	7	6	9
(Belgium) I Devroe (Canada) H Rochon	2	5	2
2	(United States) G Mulloy (United States) R Savitt	6	7	6

Third round
(Austria) A Huber (Austria) H Redl	6	2	2	8	5
(Canada) B Macken (Canada) L Main	4	6	6	6	7
(Belgium) J Brichant (Belgium) P Washer	6	4	3	3
2	(United States) G Mulloy (United States) R Savitt	3	6	6	6

Quarterfinals
(Canada) B Macken (Canada) L Main	2	1	4
2	(United States) Gardnar Mulloy (United States) Dick Savitt	6	6	6
