= 1951 Wimbledon Championships – Mixed doubles =

Mixed doubles
- 1951 Wimbledon Championships

Final
- Champions: (Australia) Frank Sedgman (United States) Doris Hart
- Runners-up: (Australia) Mervyn Rose (Australia) Nancye Bolton
- Score: 7–5, 6–3

Details
- Draw: 80 (5Q)
- Seeds: 4

Events
Singles	men	women		boys	girls
Doubles	men	women	mixed	boys	girls
- Wimbledon Championships

Eric Sturgess and Louise Brough were the defending champions, but lost in the semifinals to Mervyn Rose and Nancye Bolton.

Frank Sedgman and Doris Hart defeated Rose and Bolton in the final, 7–5, 6–3 to win the mixed doubles tennis title at the 1951 Wimbledon Championships.

== Seeds ==
1. (South Africa) Eric Sturgess / (United States) Louise Brough (semifinals)
2. (Australia) Frank Sedgman / (United States) Doris Hart (champions)
3. (Australia) Ken McGregor / (United States) Margaret Osborne (semifinals)
4. (Sweden) Sven Davidson / (United States) Shirley Fry (quarterfinals)

Click on the seed number of a player to go to their draw section.

== Draw ==
Key

- Q = Qualifier
- WC = Wild card
- LL = Lucky loser
- Alt = Alternate
- ITF = ITF entry
- PR = Protected ranking
- SR = Special ranking
- SE = Special exempt
- JE = Junior exempt
- JR = Junior Accelerator Programme entrant
- CO = College Accelerator Programme entrant
- NG = Next Gen Accelerator Program entrant
- w/o = Walkover
- r = Retired
- d = Defaulted

=== Finals ===
Quarterfinals
1	(South Africa) Eric Sturgess (United States) Louise Brough	6	6
(Hungary) József Asbóth (Hungary) Zsuzsa Körmöczy	2	3
4	(Sweden) Sven Davidson (United States) Shirley Fry	3	7
(Australia) Mervyn Rose (Australia) Nancye Bolton	6	9
(United Kingdom) Geoffrey Paish (United Kingdom) Jean Quertier	3	7
3	(Australia) Ken McGregor (United States) Margaret duPont	6	9
(United Kingdom) Tommy Anderson (United Kingdom) Anne Layfield	0	2
2	(Australia) Frank Sedgman (United States) Doris Hart	6	6

Semifinals
1	(South Africa) Eric Sturgess (United States) Louise Brough	5	2
(Australia) Mervyn Rose (Australia) Nancye Bolton	7	6
3	(Australia) Ken McGregor (United States) Margaret duPont	2	6	3
2	(Australia) Frank Sedgman (United States) Doris Hart	6	4	6

Final
(Australia) Mervyn Rose (Australia) Nancye Bolton	5	3
2	(Australia) Frank Sedgman (United States) Doris Hart	7	6

=== Top half ===
==== Section 1 ====
First round

Second round
1	(South Africa) Eric Sturgess (United States) Louise Brough	6	6
(South Africa) Robert Connor (United Kingdom) Wendy Stork	1	1
(South Africa) David Samaai (United Kingdom) Gladys Lines	4	6	6
(South Africa) David Lurie (United Kingdom) Georgie Woodgate	6	3	2
(Philippines) Felicisimo Ampon (United States) Gloria Butler	6	3
(South Africa) Nigel Cockburn (South Africa) Beryl Bartlett	8	6
(Austria) Freddie Huber (Austria) Elizabeth Broz	7	2	6
Q	(United Kingdom) Warwick Shute (United Kingdom) Denise Collier	5	6	2

Third round
1	(South Africa) E Sturgess (United States) L Brough	6	6
(South Africa) D Samaai (United Kingdom) G Lines	2	3
(South Africa) N Cockburn (South Africa) B Bartlett	6	6
(Austria) A Huber (Austria) E Broz	2	2

Fourth round
1	(South Africa) E Sturgess (United States) L Brough	5	6	6
(South Africa) N Cockburn (South Africa) B Bartlett	7	2	2

==== Section 2 ====
First round

Second round
(Republic of Ireland) Guy Jackson (Republic of Ireland) Maeve Downey	11	1
(Hungary) József Asbóth (Hungary) Zsuzsa Körmöczy	13	6
(Australia) Peter Cawthorn (United Kingdom) Jean Trower	7	5	6
(Norway) Sverre Lie (Norway) Ruth Haukenes	5	7	1
(Canada) Brendan Macken (United States) Pat Todd	w/o
(France) Philippe Chatrier (France) Jacqueline Marcellin
Q	(United States) Jack Morison (United Kingdom) Billie Woodgate	6	0	3
(Canada) Lorne Main (United Kingdom) Barbara Knapp	4	6	6

Third round
(Hungary) J Asbóth (Hungary) Z Körmöczy	2	6	6
(Australia) P Cawthorn (United Kingdom) J Trower	6	3	4
(France) P Chatrier (France) J Marcellin	6	3	3
(Canada) L Main (United Kingdom) B Knapp	2	6	6

Fourth round
(Hungary) J Asbóth (Hungary) Z Körmöczy	6	6
(Canada) L Main (United Kingdom) B Knapp	1	3

==== Section 3 ====
First round

Second round
4	(Sweden) Sven Davidson (United States) Shirley Fry	9	6
(United States) Ham Richardson (United States) Betty Rosenquest	7	1
(Dominion of Ceylon) Doug Scharenguivel (United Kingdom) Pam Bocquet	9	6
(Belgium) Jacques Peten (Switzerland) Alice Charbonnier	7	2
(India) Naresh Kumar (United Kingdom) Peggy Dawson-Scott	3	6	6
(United Kingdom) Gerry Oakley (United Kingdom) Betty Coutts	6	4	1
(United Kingdom) Paddy Roberts (United Kingdom) Susan Partridge	6	6
(Hungary) András Kálmán (United Kingdom) Noelle Knight	3	4

Third round
4	(Sweden) S Davidson (United States) S Fry	6	6
(Dominion of Ceylon) D Scharenguivel (United Kingdom) P Bocquet	4	1
(India) N Kumar (United Kingdom) P Dawson-Scott	6	6
(United Kingdom) A Roberts (United Kingdom) S Partridge	2	3

Fourth round
4	(Sweden) S Davidson (United States) S Fry	6	6
(India) N Kumar (United Kingdom) P Dawson-Scott	4	1

==== Section 4 ====
First round
(Czechoslovakia) Milan Matouš (Czechoslovakia) Helena Matouš	6	4	8
(Italy) Giovanni Cucelli (Italy) Nicla Migliori	3	6	6
(Belgium) Jacques Brichant (Belgium) Christiane Mercelis	3	6	6
(United Kingdom) Herman David (United Kingdom) Nancy Glover	6	3	4
(Czechoslovakia) Bohuslav Hykš (United Kingdom) Alex McKelvie	1	3
(United Kingdom) Cliff Hovell (United Kingdom) Mary Halford	6	6
(United Kingdom) Tony Mottram (United Kingdom) Joy Mottram	6	6
(France) Jean Borotra (United Kingdom) Kay Tuckey	4	1
(United Kingdom) Roland Carter (United Kingdom) Effie Peters	0	2
(Australia) Mervyn Rose (Australia) Nancye Bolton	6	6
(United Kingdom) Harold Marsland (United Kingdom) Evelyn Moeller	6	6
(United Kingdom) Tadeusz Slawek (United Kingdom) Helen Proudfoot	3	4
(Sweden) Staffan Stockenberg (United Kingdom) Freda Hammersley	7	7
(New Zealand) Dennis Coombe (United Kingdom) Betty Wilford	5	5
(United Kingdom) Henry Billington (United Kingdom) Susan Billington	6	7	3
(Sweden) Torsten Johansson (Sweden) Birgit Gullbrandsson-Sandén	4	9	6

Second round
(Czechoslovakia) M Matouš (Czechoslovakia) H Matouš	6	7
(Belgium) J Brichant (Belgium) C Mercelis	2	5
(United Kingdom) C Hovell (United Kingdom) M Halford	1	2
(United Kingdom) A Mottram (United Kingdom) J Mottram	6	6
(Australia) M Rose (Australia) N Bolton	6	6
(United Kingdom) H Marsland (United Kingdom) E Moeller	0	4
(Sweden) S Stockenberg (United Kingdom) W Hammersley	3	5
(Sweden) T Johansson (Sweden) B Gullbrandsson-Sandén	6	7

Third round
(Czechoslovakia) M Matouš (Czechoslovakia) H Matouš	4	4
(United Kingdom) A Mottram (United Kingdom) J Mottram	6	6
(Australia) M Rose (Australia) N Bolton	7	11
(Sweden) T Johansson (Sweden) B Gullbrandsson-Sandén	5	9

Fourth round
(United Kingdom) A Mottram (United Kingdom) J Mottram	3	5
(Australia) M Rose (Australia) N Bolton	6	7

=== Bottom half ===
==== Section 5 ====
First round
Q	(United Kingdom) Don Paton (United Kingdom) Judy Wallace	6	8
(United Kingdom) Howard Walton (United Kingdom) Vera Thomas	1	6
(South Africa) Russell Seymour (Australia) Clare Proctor	1	3
(Australia) Don Candy (United Kingdom) Margot Gordon	6	6
(United Kingdom) Geoffrey Paish (United Kingdom) Jean Quertier	6	6
(United Kingdom) Jack Deloford (United Kingdom) Joan Curry	2	1
Q	(United Kingdom) Derrick Lester (United Kingdom) Gertrude Preston	0	3
(Switzerland) Jost Spitzer (Switzerland) Violette Rigollet	6	6
(South Africa) Norman Farquharson (South Africa) Frances Farquharson	4	5
(South Africa) Sydney Levy (Argentina) Mary Terán de Weiss	6	7
(United Kingdom) John Horn (United Kingdom) Pat Lewis	6	7
(United Kingdom) Leslie Cater (United Kingdom) Leonie Brighton	3	5
(Philippines) Cesar Carmona (United Kingdom) Gem Hoahing	6	6
Q	(United Kingdom) Darrell Shaw (United Kingdom) Pat Harrison	0	3
(Canada) Henri Rochon (United Kingdom) Elsie Phillips	2	1
(Brazil) Armando Vieira (United States) Barbara Davidson	6	6

Second round
Q	(United Kingdom) D Paton (United Kingdom) J Wallace	2	6	3
(Australia) D Candy (United Kingdom) M Gordon	6	4	6
(United Kingdom) G Paish (United Kingdom) J Quertier	6	6
(Switzerland) J Spitzer (Switzerland) V Rigollet	0	4
(South Africa) S Levy (Argentina) M Terán de Weiss	6	6	6
(United Kingdom) J Horn (United Kingdom) P Lewis	3	8	4
(Philippines) C Carmona (United Kingdom) C Hoahing	0	3
(Brazil) A Vieira (United States) B Davidson	6	6

Third round
(Australia) D Candy (United Kingdom) M Gordon	8	3
(United Kingdom) G Paish (United Kingdom) J Quertier	10	6
(South Africa) S Levy (Argentina) M Terán de Weiss	2	9
(Brazil) A Vieira (United States) B Davidson	6	11

Fourth round
(United Kingdom) G Paish (United Kingdom) J Quertier	6	6	6
(Brazil) A Vieira (United States) B Davidson	8	2	4

==== Section 6 ====
First round

Second round
(United States) Gene Garrett (United Kingdom) Joy Hibbert	6	8
(South Africa) Abe Segal (United Kingdom) Molly Blair	4	6
(United Kingdom) Murray Deloford (United States) Arvilla McGuire
(France) Paul Rémy (France) Nelly Adamson	w/o
(United Kingdom) Mike Lloyd (United Kingdom) Joey Lloyd	3	4
(Argentina) Heraldo Weiss (Netherlands) Nel Hermsen	6	6
(Poland) Czesław Spychała (United Kingdom) Bea Walter	1	7	3
3	(Australia) Ken McGregor (United States) Margaret duPont	6	5	6

Third round
(United States) W Garrett (United Kingdom) J Hibbert	8	7
(United Kingdom) M Deloford (United States) A McGuire	6	5
(Argentina) H Weiss (Netherlands) P Hermsen	0	4
3	(Australia) K McGregor (United States) M duPont	6	6

Fourth round
(United States) W Garrett (United Kingdom) J Hibbert	1	0
3	(Australia) K McGregor (United States) M duPont	6	6

==== Section 7 ====
First round

Second round
(United Kingdom) Ron Statham (United Kingdom) Helen Fletcher	6	3	6
(Australia) Don Tregonning (United Kingdom) Rosemary Bulleid	4	6	1
(Netherlands) Hans van Swol (United Kingdom) Jean Walker-Smith	6	6
(India) Jimmay Mehta (United Kingdom) Janet Morgan	3	2
(United Kingdom) Headley Baxter (United Kingdom) Pat Ward	4	1
(United Kingdom) John Barrett (United Kingdom) Margaret Emerson	6	6
(United Kingdom) Tommy Anderson (United Kingdom) Anne Layfield
(Italy) Marcello del Bello (Italy) Manuela Bologna	w/o

Third round
(United Kingdom) R Statham (United Kingdom) H Fletcher	6	1	3
(Netherlands) H van Swol (United Kingdom) J Walker-Smith	2	6	6
(United Kingdom) J Barrett (United Kingdom) M Emerson	0	6	1
(United Kingdom) T Anderson (United Kingdom) A Layfield	6	4	6

Fourth round
(Netherlands) H van Swol (United Kingdom) J Walker-Smith	w/o
(United Kingdom) T Anderson (United Kingdom) A Layfield

==== Section 8 ====
First round

Second round
(Netherlands) Ivo Rinkel (Netherlands) Mrs MA Schmier
(Philippines) Raymundo Deyro (United States) Nancy Chaffee	w/o
(South Africa) Leon Norgarb (Australia) Thelma Long	w/o
(United Kingdom) Derek Bull (United Kingdom) Patsy O'Connell
(United Kingdom) Claude Lister (United Kingdom) Thelma Lister	0	2
(India) Narendra Nath (United States) Althea Gibson	6	6
(United States) Hal Burrows (United States) Beverly Baker	1	1
2	(Australia) Frank Sedgman (United States) Doris Hart	6	6

Third round
(Netherlands) I Rinkel (Netherlands) Mrs MA Schmier	8	6
(United Kingdom) D Bull (United Kingdom) P O'Connell	6	4
(India) N Nath (United States) A Gibson	6	6
2	(Australia) F Sedgman (United States) D Hart	8	8

Fourth round
(Netherlands) I Rinkel (Netherlands) Mrs MA Schmier	0	1
2	(Australia) F Sedgman (United States) D Hart	6	6
