= 1951 French Championships – Men's singles =

Men's singles
- 1951 French Championships

Final
- Champion: (Egypt) Jaroslav Drobný
- Runner-up: (South Africa) Eric Sturgess
- Score: 6–3, 6–3, 6–3

Events
Singles	men	women		boys	girls
Doubles	men	women	mixed	boys	girls
- French Championships

Jaroslav Drobný defeated Eric Sturgess 6–3, 6–3, 6–3 in the final to win the men's singles tennis title at the 1951 French Championships.

== Seeds ==
The seeded players are listed below. Jaroslav Drobný is the champion; others show the round in which they were eliminated.

1. (Australia) Frank Sedgman (semifinals)
2. (Sweden) Sven Davidson (fourth round)
3. (Egypt) Jaroslav Drobný (champion)
4. (United States) Dick Savitt (quarterfinals)
5. (South Africa) Eric Sturgess (final)
6. (United States) Gardnar Mulloy (third round)
7. (Australia) Ken McGregor (semifinals)
8. (United States) Budge Patty (fourth round)

== Draw ==
=== Key ===
- Q = Qualifier
- WC = Wild card
- LL = Lucky loser
- r = Retired

=== Finals ===
Quarterfinals
(Australia) Frank Sedgman	6	6	6
(United States) Straight Clark	4	4	3
(Egypt) Jaroslav Drobný	1	6	6	8	6
(United States) Dick Savitt	6	8	4	6	3
(South Africa) Eric Sturgess	11	4	6	6
(Australia) Mervyn Rose	9	6	3	3
(Australia) Ken McGregor	9	9	6
(Sweden) Lennart Bergelin	7	7	1

Semifinals
(Australia) Frank Sedgman	0	3	1
(Egypt) Jaroslav Drobný	6	6	6
(South Africa) Eric Sturgess	10	7	8	5	9
(Australia) Ken McGregor	8	9	6	7	7

Final
(Egypt) Jaroslav Drobný	6	6	6
(South Africa) Eric Sturgess	3	3	3

=== Earlier rounds ===
==== Section 1 ====
First round

Second round
1	(Australia) Sedgman	6	6	6
(United States) Freedman	2	4	1
(South Africa) Davidson	6	6
(France) Boussus	3	8	rtd.
(France) Thomas	6	5	4	6	6
(United Kingdom) Horn	2	7	6	4	2
(Philippines) Ampon	6	1	6	6
(Belgium) Brichant	1	6	2	3

Third round
1	(Australia) Sedgman	6	6	6
(South Africa) Davidson	4	2	3
(France) Thomas	10	6	2	2
(Philippines) Ampon	12	3	6	6

Fourth round
1	(Australia) Sedgman	6	1	3	7	7
(Philippines) Ampon	3	6	6	5	5

==== Section 2 ====
First round
(South Africa) Samaai	6	6	6
(France) Berthet	1	3	3

Second round
2	(Sweden) Davidson	6	7	6
(Philippines) Carmona	1	5	0
(Spain) Olozaga	4	6	2	4
(France) Pellizza	6	4	6	6
(Italy) Clerici	w/	o
(United States) Clark
(Brazil) Vieira	6	6	6
(South Africa) Samaai	4	1	3

Third round
2	(Sweden) Davidson	6	6	6
(France) Pellizza	1	3	2
(United States) Clark	6	6	6
(Brazil) Vieira	3	2	1

Fourth round
2	(Sweden) Davidson	10	6	4	5	3
(United States) Clark	8	2	6	7	6

==== Section 3 ====
First round
3	(Egypt) Drobný
(France) Gentien
(France) Nys	3	6	7	4	6
(Belgium) Peten	6	2	5	6	4
(France) De Kermadec	9	6	6	6
(Myanmar) Ong	11	0	4	2
(France) Pilet	6	6	6	6
(United Kingdom) Becker	8	6	3	1
(United States) Lurie	6	6	6
(Egypt) Coen	4	1	1
(United States) Garrett	2	6	8	6
(Italy) Merlo	6	4	8	0
(Philippines) Deyro	12	8	6
(Denmark) Nielsen	10	6	4
(France) Haillet	6	6	8
(France) Le Sueur	4	3	6

Second round
3	(Egypt) Drobný	6	6	6
(France) Nys	4	0	3
(France) De Kermadec	6	6	0	9
(France) Pilet	3	1	6	7
(United States) Lurie	2	1	6'	2
(United States) Garrett	6	6	4	6
(Philippines) Deyro	6	6	6
(France) Haillet	1	2	3

Third round
(Egypt) Drobný	6	6	6
(France) De Kermadec	3	2	1
(United States) Garrett	3	0	2
(Philippines) Deyro	6	6	6

Fourth round
(Egypt) Drobný	6	6	6
(Philippines) Deyro	2	4	0

==== Section 4 ====
First round
4	(United States) Savitt	6	6	6
(United Kingdom) Walton	1	1	0
(South Africa) Levy	6	11	6
(Italy) De Bello	3	9	2
(France) Destremau
(France) Dubuc	w/	o
(Switzerland) Spitzer	6	6	7
(France) Schaff	3	1	5
(Brazil) Procopio
(Sweden) Johansson	w/	o
(Poland) Skonecki	6	3	6	6
(France) Iemetti	1	6	3	0
(South Africa) Norgarb	6	6	2	4	6
(France) Delhomme	2	3	6	6	2
(Italy) Gardini	6	6	6
(France) Bayon	0	4	1

Second round
4	(United States) Savitt	3	6	4	6	6
(South Africa) Levy	6	4	6	4	1
(France) Destremau	6	6	6
(Switzerland) Spitzer	3	2	2
(Brazil) Procopio	1	4	1
(Poland) Skonecki	6	6	6
(South Africa) Norgarb	4	1	8	4
(Italy) Gardini	6	6	6	6

Third round
4	(United States) Savitt	6	6	3	6
(France) Destremau	2	3	6	2
(Poland) Skonecki	3	6	4
(Italy) Gardini	6	8	6

Fourth round
4	(United States) Savitt	6	3	6'	8
(Italy) Gardini	4	6	1	6

==== Section 5 ====
First round
(France) Rémy
(France) Grandguillot	w/	o
(Netherlands) Van Swol	6	6	6
(France) Jamain	4	3	1
(United States) Burrows
(France) Grandet	w/	o
(Italy) Cucelli	7	6	6
(France) Laval	5	3	2
(Tunisia) Naccache	6	4	6	6
(France) Chatrier	4	6	3	3
(Switzerland) Albrecht	4	6	3	6	6
(France) Lemasson	6	1	6	3	4
(Italy) del Bello
(Poland) Oloszowski	w/	o
5	(South Africa) Sturgess	6	6	6
(Egypt) Shafei	2	1	0

Second round
(France) Rémy	6	9	6
(Netherlands) Van Swol	3	7	2
(United States) Burrows	6	6	4	2
(Italy) Cucelli	2	8	6	6
(Tunisia) Naccache	6	6	6	4	0
(Switzerland) Albrecht	1	3	8	6	6
(Italy) del Bello	3	3	1
5	(South Africa) Sturgess	6	6	6

Third round
(France) Rémy	6	4	2	7	1
(Italy) Cucelli	2	6	6	5	6
(Switzerland) Albrecht	2	1	3
5	(South Africa) Sturgess	6	6	6

Fourth round
(Italy) Cucelli	2	6	1	2
5	(South Africa) Sturgess	6	4	6	6

==== Section 6 ====
First round
(France) Bernard
(France) Rodel	w/	o
(South Africa) Cockburn	6	6	6
(New Zealand) Coombe	3	0	2
(Australia) Rose	10	6	6
(Denmark) Ulrich	8	1	1
(Italy) Bergamo	6	4	6	6
(United States) Henry	2	6	1	3
(Czechoslovakia) Matouš	6	6	6
(France) Dessair	4	2	3
(Czechoslovakia) Černík	3	6	6	7
(France) Ducos de La Haille	6	3	2	5
(Israel) Avidan-Weiss	6	6	4	7
(Czechoslovakia) Hykš	3	4	6	5
6	(United States) Mulloy	6	6	6
(Egypt) Mandelbaum	1	4	4

Second round
(France) Bernard	6	6	1	2	2
(South Africa) Cockburn	2	4	6	6	6
(Australia) Rose	6	6	6
(Italy) Bergamo	3	2	1
(Czechoslovakia) Matouš	4	3	4
(Czechoslovakia) Černík	6	6	6
(Israel) Avidan-Weiss	0	1	1
6	(United States) Mulloy	6	6	6

Third round
(South Africa) Cockburn	4	6	7	6	4
(Australia) Rose	6	4	9	2	6
(Czechoslovakia) Černík	6	8	6
6	(United States) Mulloy	3	6	3

Fourth round
(Australia) Rose	6	6	6
(Czechoslovakia) Černík	3	4	2

==== Section 7 ====
First round

Second round
(Belgium) Devroe	6	2	2
(United States) Richardson	8	6	6
(Brazil) Cardozo	2	6	2	2
(France) Molinari	6	4	6	6
(United States) Wilder	5	1	0
(United Kingdom) Roberts	7	6	6
(France) Journu	4	4	3
7	(Australia) McGregor	6	6	6

Third round
(United States) Richardson	6	6	4	6
(France) Molinari	4	4	6	3
(United Kingdom) Roberts	2	1	2
7	(Australia) McGregor	6	6	6

Fourth round
(United States) Richardson	6	4	3
7	(Australia) McGregor	8	6	6

==== Section 8 ====
First round

Second round
(France) Lemyze	2	2	4
(Sweden) Bergelin	6	6	6
(Ecuador) Lerque	1	4	5
(France) Abdesselam	6	6	6
(France) Billaudot	w/	o
(United Kingdom) Mottram
(France) Malosse	3	2	1
8	(United States) Patty	6	6	6

Third round
(Sweden) Bergelin	6	4	6	6
(France) Abdesselam	3	6	3	4
(United Kingdom) Mottram	7	4	3
8	(United States) Patty	9	6	6

Fourth round
(Sweden) Bergelin	3	6	6	3	6
8	(United States) Patty	6	4	2	6	3

Preceded by 1951 Australian Championships – Men's singles	Grand Slam men's singles	Succeeded by 1951 Wimbledon Championships – Men's singles
