= 1954 French Championships – Men's singles =

Men's singles
- 1954 French Championships

Final
- Champion: (United States) Tony Trabert
- Runner-up: (United States) Arthur Larsen
- Score: 6–4, 7–5, 6–1

Details
- Draw: 128
- Seeds: 16

Events
| Singles | men | women |
| Doubles | men | women |
| ← 1953 · | French Championships | · 1955 → |

Second-seeded Tony Trabert defeated Arthur Larsen 6–4, 7–5, 6–1 in the final to win the men's singles tennis title at the 1954 French Championships.

== Seeds ==
The seeded players are listed below. Tony Trabert is the champion; others show the round in which they were eliminated.

1. (Australia) Lew Hoad (fourth round)
2. (United States) Tony Trabert (champion)
3. (Australia) Ken Rosewall (fourth round)
4. (United States) Vic Seixas (quarterfinals)
5. (Egypt) Jaroslav Drobný (fourth round)
6. (United States) Budge Patty (semifinals)
7. (Australia) Mervyn Rose (quarterfinals)
8. (Argentina) Enrique Morea (semifinals)
9. (Belgium) Philippe Washer (fourth round)
10. (Denmark) Kurt Nielsen (second round)
11. (Belgium) Jacques Brichant (fourth round)
12. (United States) Arthur Larsen (final)
13. (Australia) Rex Hartwig (fourth round)
14. (Sweden) Sven Davidson (quarterfinals)
15. (Brazil) Bob Falkenburg (fourth round)
16. (United States) Gardnar Mulloy (quarterfinals)

== Draw ==
=== Key ===
- Q = Qualifier
- WC = Wild card
- LL = Lucky loser
- r = Retired

=== Finals ===
Quarterfinals
16 | (United States) Gardnar Mulloy | 3 | 4 | 1
8 | (Argentina) Enrique Morea | 6 | 6 | 6
4 | (United States) Vic Seixas | 4 | 6 | 6 | 1
12 | (United States) Arthur Larsen | 6 | 1 | 8 | 6
6 | (United States) Budge Patty | 6 | 6 | 6
14 | (Sweden) Sven Davidson | 4 | 0 | 4
7 | (Australia) Mervyn Rose | 5 | 6 | 4 | 2
2 | (United States) Tony Trabert | 7 | 4 | 6 | 6

Semifinals
8 | (Argentina) Enrique Morea | 4 | 3 | 4
12 | (United States) Arthur Larsen | 6 | 6 | 6
6 | (United States) Budge Patty | 1 | 5 | 4
2 | (United States) Tony Trabert | 6 | 7 | 6

Final
12 | (United States) Arthur Larsen | 4 | 5 | 1
2 | (United States) Tony Trabert | 6 | 7 | 6

=== Earlier rounds ===
==== Section 1 ====
First round
1 | (Australia) Hoad | 6 | 6 | 6
(Egypt) Zalzal | 0 | 4 | 1
(Brazil) Guimarães | 4 | 4 | 8 | 3
(United Kingdom) Knight | 6 | 6 | 6 | 6
(France) Jauffret
(Canada) Bedard
(Uruguay) Argon | 6 | 2 | 6 | 3 | 6
(France) Perreau-Saussine | 3 | 6 | 0 | 6 | 8
16 | (United States) Mulloy | 6 | 6 | 6
(Italy) Jacobini | 1 | 4 | 4
(United States) Fox | 2 | 2 | 6 | 6 | 6
(Netherlands) Van Meegeren | 6 | 6 | 1 | 2 | 4
(France) Abdesselam | 5 | 6 | 6 | 6
(Hungary) Jancsó | 7 | 2 | 1 | 3
(Switzerland) Blondel | 2 | 6 | 5 | 4
(Italy) Sirola | 6 | 2 | 7 | 6

Second round
1 | (Australia) Hoad | 6 | 6 | 6
(United Kingdom) Knight | 0 | 3 | 3
(Canada) Bedard | 3 | 10 | 3 | 6 | 6
(France) Perreau-Saussine | 6 | 8 | 6 | 4 | 4
16 | (United States) Mulloy | 6 | 6 | 6
(United States) Fox | 2 | 4 | 4
(France) Abdesselam | 6 | 6 | 6
(Italy) Sirola | 2 | 4 | 3

Third round
1 | (Australia) Hoad | 7 | 8 | 6
(Canada) Bedard | 5 | 6 | 3
16 | (United States) Mulloy | 7 | 6 | 5 | 6
(France) Abdesselam | 5 | 4 | 7 | 3

Fourth round
1 | (Australia) Hoad | 2 | 6 | 5 | 4
16 | (United States) Mulloy | 6 | 2 | 7 | 6

==== Section 2 ====
First round
8 | (Argentina) Morea
(United States) Paton
(Spain) Tintore | 3 | 1 | 2
(Chile) Hammersley | 6 | 6 | 6
(Hungary) Asbóth | 6 | 6 | 6
(Australia) Emerson | 4 | 1 | 4
(France) De Kermadec
(France) Desq
9 | (Belgium) Washer | 6 | 6 | 6
(India) Kumar | 1 | 3 | 2
(Italy) Fachini | 6 | 6 | 6
(France) Lemasson | 4 | 4 | 2
(Argentina) Soriano | 1 | 4 | 2
(United Kingdom) Burrows | 6 | 6 | 6
(France) Delhomme | 2 | 0 | 2
(Socialist Federal Republic of Yugoslavia) Petrovic | 6 | 6 | 6

Second round
8 | (Argentina) Morea | 8 | 6 | 6 | 6
(Chile) Hammersley | 10 | 4 | 2 | 3
(Hungary) Asbóth | 6 | 6 | 9
(France) De Kermadec | 4 | 1 | 7
9 | (Belgium) Washer | 6 | 6 | 6
(Italy) Fachini | 1 | 0 | 3
(United Kingdom) Burrows | 6 | 6 | 6
(Socialist Federal Republic of Yugoslavia) Petrovic | 1 | 2 | 1

Third round
8 | (Argentina) Morea | 10 | 8 | 6
(Hungary) Asbóth | 8 | 6 | 2
9 | (Belgium) Washer | 2 | 6 | 6 | 6
(United Kingdom) Burrows | 6 | 2 | 0 | 0

Fourth round
8 | (Argentina) Morea | 6 | 2 | 4 | 6 | 6
9 | (Belgium) Washer | 1 | 6 | 6 | 4 | 1

==== Section 3 ====
First round
4 | (United States) Seixas
(Italy) Clerici
(United Kingdom) Mexborough | 1 | 2 | 6
(France) Sanglier | 6 | 6 | 8
(West Germany) Buchholz | 2 | 3 | 2
(United Kingdom) Mottram | 6 | 6 | 6
(France) Laval | 5 | 2 | 9 | 5
(United States) Stern | 7 | 6 | 7 | 7
13 | (Australia) Hartwig | 6 | 6 | 7
(France) Bayon | 0 | 3 | 5
(France) Haillet | 6 | 6 | 6
(France) Weiss | 0 | 2 | 2
(Socialist Federal Republic of Yugoslavia) Pallada | 6 | 6 | 6
(Federation of Rhodesia and Nyasaland) Katz | 1 | 4 | 1
(South Vietnam) Võ Văn Bảy | 0 | 1 | 4
(Brazil) Vieira | 6 | 6 | 6

Second round
4 | (United States) Seixas | 6 | 6 | 6
(France) Sanglier | 0 | 1 | 3
(United Kingdom) Mottram | 6 | 6 | 6
(United States) Stern | 2 | 1 | 0
13 | (Australia) Hartwig | 6 | 2 | 6 | 6
(France) Haillet | 4 | 6 | 4 | 3
(Socialist Federal Republic of Yugoslavia) Pallada | 5 | 6 | 7
(Brazil) Vieira | 7 | 8 | 9

Third round
4 | (United States) Seixas | 8 | 6 | 6
(United Kingdom) Mottram | 6 | 4 | 3
13 | (Australia) Hartwig | 2 | 6 | 2 | 6 | 7
(Brazil) Vieira | 6 | 2 | 6 | 3 | 5

Fourth round
4 | (United States) Seixas | 8 | 3 | 6 | 5 | 10
13 | (Australia) Hartwig | 6 | 6 | 3 | 7 | 8

==== Section 4 ====
First round
5 | (Egypt) Drobný | 6 | 6 | 6
(France) Larcade | 1 | 3 | 1
(Brazil) Moreira | 2 | 6 | 6 | 3 | 9
(France) Grinda | 6 | 2 | 3 | 6 | 11
(Belgium) Mezzi | 6 | 6 | 7
(France) Frances | 1 | 2 | 5
(France) Dubuc | 8 | 2 | 1 | 1
(United States) Shea | 6 | 6 | 6 | 6
12 | (United States) Larsen | 6 | 6 | 6 | 6
(India) Krishnan | 1 | 4 | 8 | 3
(Germany) Hermann | 6 | 6 | 6
(France) Bouteleux | 1 | 2 | 1
(France) Ducos De La Haille | 6 | 0 | 6 | 6
(United Kingdom) Hannam | 3 | 6 | 4 | 2
(France) Lasry | 2 | 1 | 6
(Australia) Cooper | 6 | 6 | 8

Second round
5 | (Egypt) Drobný | 6 | 6 | 6
(France) Grinda | 3 | 1 | 2
(Belgium) Mezzi | 1 | 2 | 6
(United States) Shea | 6 | 6 | 8
12 | (United States) Larsen | 6 | 6 | 7
(Germany) Hermann | 1 | 2 | 5
(France) Ducos De La Haille | 6 | 3 | 6 | 6
(Australia) Cooper | 3 | 6 | 3 | 1

Third round
5 | (Egypt) Drobný | 6 | 6 | 6
(United States) Shea | 2 | 3 | 2
12 | (United States) Larsen | 6 | 6 | 6 | 6
(France) Ducos De La Haille | 4 | 8 | 2 | 4

Fourth round
5 | (Egypt) Drobný | 4 | 7 | 4 | 6 | 1
12 | (United States) Larsen | 6 | 5 | 6 | 3 | 6

==== Section 5 ====
First round
(France) Thieullent | 3 | 3 | 1
(France) Nys | 6 | 6 | 6
(Italy) Belardinelli | 2 | 6 | 1 | 2
(Australia) Fraser | 6 | 4 | 6 | 6
(Czechoslovakia) Hecht | 10 | 3 | 1
(New Zealand) Barry | 12 | 6 | 6
(France) Favieres | 6 | 3 | 3 | 3
11 | (Belgium) Brichant | 3 | 6 | 6 | 6
(New Zealand) Otway | 3 | 2 | 1
(France) Destremau | 6 | 6 | 6
(France) Schaff | 2 | 3 | 4
(Italy) Pietrangeli | 6 | 6 | 6
(France) Deniau
(Socialist Federal Republic of Yugoslavia) Panajotovic
(Ecuador) Lerque | 2 | 1 | 0
6 | (United States) Patty | 6 | 6 | 6

Second round
(France) Nys | 0 | 1 | 2
(Australia) Fraser | 6 | 6 | 6
(New Zealand) Barry | 6 | 3 | 5 | 4
11 | (Belgium) Brichant | 2 | 6 | 7 | 6
(France) Destremau | 3 | 2 | 7 | 3
(Italy) Pietrangeli | 6 | 6 | 5 | 6
(Socialist Federal Republic of Yugoslavia) Panajotovic | 2 | 1 | 1
6 | (United States) Patty | 6 | 6 | 6

Third round
(Australia) Fraser | 6 | 2 | 6 | 1 | 4
11 | (Belgium) Brichant | 3 | 6 | 2 | 6 | 6
(Italy) Pietrangeli | 6 | 2 | 6 | 1 | 3
6 | (United States) Patty | 3 | 6 | 2 | 6 | 6

Fourth round
11 | (Belgium) Brichant | 3 | 1 | 4
6 | (United States) Patty | 6 | 6 | 6

==== Section 6 ====
First round
(France) Lemyze | 6 | 6 | 0 | 4 | 3
(Australia) Howe | 2 | 1 | 6 | 6 | 6
(France) Dessair | 4 | 3 | 1
(United States) Vincent | 6 | 6 | 6
(United Kingdom) Anderson | 6 | 4 | 8 | 2 | 6
(Norway) Sturdza | 3 | 6 | 6 | 6 | 3
(Italy) Lazzarino | 4 | 1 | 0
14 | (Sweden) Davidson | 6 | 6 | 6
(France) Grandet | 6 | 6 | 6
(France) Mey | 0 | 4 | 0
(France) Chatrier | 4 | 3 | 4
(Italy) Maggi | 6 | 6 | 6
(France) Deniau
(United Kingdom) Oakley
(Socialist Federal Republic of Yugoslavia) Plećević | 2 | 2 | 2
3 | (Australia) Rosewall | 6 | 6 | 6

Second round
(Australia) Howe | 2 | 10 | 2 | 3
(United States) Vincent | 6 | 8 | 6 | 6
(United Kingdom) Anderson | 1 | 0 | 1
14 | (Sweden) Davidson | 6 | 6 | 6
(France) Grandet | 6 | 2 | 4 | 6 | 0
(Italy) Maggi | 1 | 6 | 6 | 3 | 6
(United Kingdom) Oakley | 3 | 1 | 3
3 | (Australia) Rosewall | 6 | 6 | 6

Third round
(United States) Vincent | 4 | 0 | 3
14 | (Sweden) Davidson | 6 | 6 | 6
(Italy) Maggi | 2 | 1 | 5
3 | (Australia) Rosewall | 6 | 6 | 7

Fourth round
14 | (Sweden) Davidson | 6 | 3 | 6 | 6
3 | (Australia) Rosewall | 3 | 6 | 3 | 3

==== Section 7 ====
First round
(United States) Dorfman | 6 | 6 | 7
(Italy) Scribani | 2 | 3 | 5
(France) Follveider | 2 | 4 | 6
(France) Berthet | 6 | 6 | 8
(France) Rémy | 6 | 6 | 6
(France) Lartigue | 0 | 2 | 2
(Hungary) Ádám-Stolpa | 3 | 2 | 4
10 | (Denmark) Nielsen | 6 | 6 | 6
(France) Molinari | 4 | 4 | 6 | 6 | 6
(Belgium) Devroe | 6 | 6 | 1 | 4 | 3
(France) Rinderknech | 1 | 1 | 1
(Canada) Main | 6 | 6 | 6
(France) Dubuisson
(United States) Van Voorhees
(France) Jamain | 3 | 3 | 1
7 | (Australia) Rose | 6 | 6 | 6

Second round
(United States) Dorfman | 6 | 6 | 6
(France) Berthet | 1 | 0 | 2
(France) Rémy | 8 | 6 | 6
10 | (Denmark) Nielsen | 6 | 4 | 3
(France) Molinari | 1 | 6 | 3 | 4
(Canada) Main | 6 | 4 | 6 | 6
(France) Dubuisson | 7 | 0 | 2
7 | (Australia) Rose | 9 | 6 | 6

Third round
(United States) Dorfman | 0 | 1 | 3
(France) Rémy | 6 | 6 | 6
(Canada) Main | 5 | 6 | 5 | 6 | 3
7 | (Australia) Rose | 7 | 3 | 7 | 3 | 6

Fourth round
(France) Rémy | 8 | 4 | 4 | 5
7 | (Australia) Rose | 6 | 6 | 6 | 7

==== Section 8 ====
First round
(France) Pellizza | 7 | 1 | 1 | 6
(New Zealand) Robson | 5 | 6 | 6 | 2
(United States) Robineau | 0 | 3 | 0
(Poland) Skonecki | 6 | 6 | 6
(Australia) Reid | 6 | 6 | 4 | 4 | 6
(France) Hode | 1 | 4 | 6 | 6 | 2
(United Kingdom) Becker | 4 | 6 | 3 | 1
15 | (Brazil) Falkenburg | 6 | 4 | 6 | 6
(Switzerland) Balestra | 4 | 6 | 6 | 6
(France) Jalabert | 6 | 1 | 4 | 4
(India) Nath | 0 | 4 | 3
(Australia) Arkinstall | 6 | 6 | 6
(Netherlands) Krijt | 5 | 6 | 6 | 6
(France) Guilbert | 7 | 2 | 3 | 2
(France) Malosse | 2 | 5 | 4
2 | (United States) Trabert | 6 | 7 | 6

Second round
(France) Pellizza | 3 | 4 | 4
(Poland) Skonecki | 6 | 6 | 6
(Australia) Reid | 7 | 6 | 1 | 2
15 | (Brazil) Falkenburg | 9 | 2 | 6 | 6
(Switzerland) Balestra | 3 | 4 | 1
(Australia) Arkinstall | 6 | 6 | 6
(Netherlands) Krijt | 2 | 1 | 2
2 | (United States) Trabert | 6 | 6 | 6

Third round
(Poland) Skonecki | 4 | 6 | 1 | 4
15 | (Brazil) Falkenburg | 6 | 2 | 6 | 6
(Australia) Arkinstall | 2 | 4 | 0
2 | (United States) Trabert | 6 | 6 | 6

Fourth round
15 | (Brazil) Falkenburg | 3 | 2 | 2
2 | (United States) Trabert | 6 | 6 | 6

| Preceded by 1954 Australian Championships – Men's singles | Grand Slam men's singles | Succeeded by 1954 Wimbledon Championships – Men's singles |
