= 1951 Wimbledon Championships – Men's singles =

Men's singles
- 1951 Wimbledon Championships

Final
- Champion: (United States) Dick Savitt
- Runner-up: (Australia) Ken McGregor
- Score: 6–4, 6–4, 6–4

Details
- Draw: 128 (10Q)
- Seeds: 10

Events
Singles	men	women		boys	girls
Doubles	men	women	mixed	boys	girls
- Wimbledon Championships

In the 1951 Wimbledon Championships – Gentlemen's Singles tennis competition, Dick Savitt defeated Ken McGregor in the final, 6–4, 6–4, 6–4 to win the title. He was the second ever American to win the Wimbledon and Australian tournaments in the same year. Number 4 seed Budge Patty was the defending champion, but lost in the second round to another American, the unseeded 17-year-old Ham Richardson.

This was the final Wimbledon appearance of three-time finalist Gottfried von Cramm.

== Progress of the competition ==
After defeating Patty, Richardson went out in the fourth round, losing to another unseeded player, the Brazilian Armando Vieira; this was Vieira's most successful Wimbledon, but he lost in the quarterfinals to South Africa's Eric Sturgess, a former world number one, in straight sets. McGregor reached the final by defeating Sturgess in the semifinals.

== Seeds ==
1. (Australia) Frank Sedgman (quarterfinals)
2. (Egypt) Jaroslav Drobný (third round)
3. (United States) Art Larsen (quarterfinals)
4. (United States) Budge Patty (second round)
5. (United States) Herbie Flam (semifinals)
6. (United States) Dick Savitt (champion)
7. (Australia) Ken McGregor (final)
8. (South Africa) Eric Sturgess (semifinals)
9. (United States) Gardnar Mulloy (third round)
10. (Sweden) Lennart Bergelin (quarterfinals)

Click on the seed number of a player to go to their draw section.

== Draw ==
Key

- Q = Qualifier
- WC = Wild card
- LL = Lucky loser
- Alt = Alternate
- ITF = ITF entry
- PR = Protected ranking
- SR = Special ranking
- SE = Special exempt
- JE = Junior exempt
- JR = Junior Accelerator Programme entrant
- CO = College Accelerator Programme entrant
- NG = Next Gen Accelerator Program entrant
- w/o = Walkover
- r = Retired
- d = Defaulted

=== Finals ===
Quarterfinals
1	(Australia) Frank Sedgman	6	6	3	4	5
5	(United States) Herbie Flam	2	1	6	6	7
3	(United States) Art Larsen	1	4	4
6	(United States) Dick Savitt	6	6	6
8	(South Africa) Eric Sturgess	6	6	6
(Brazil) Armando Vieira	2	0	3
7	(Australia) Ken McGregor	6	4	5	6	6
10	(Sweden) Lennart Bergelin	0	6	7	2	4

Semifinals
5	(United States) Herbie Flam	6	13	3	2
6	(United States) Dick Savitt	1	15	6	6
8	(South Africa) Eric Sturgess	4	6	3	5
7	(Australia) Ken McGregor	6	3	6	7

Final
6	(United States) Dick Savitt	6	6	6
7	(Australia) Ken McGregor	4	4	4

=== Top half ===
==== Section 1 ====
First round
1	(Australia) Frank Sedgman	6	6	6
(Philippines) Raymundo Deyro	4	3	4
Q	(Sweden) Sven Davidson	6	6	3	6
Q	(United Kingdom) Clive Bernstein	2	0	6	3
(Norway) Sverre Lie	6	3	7	6	6
(Republic of Ireland) Guy Jackson	8	6	5	3	1
(United States) Robert Sibert	0	0	2
(United States) Straight Clark	6	6	6
9	(United States) Gardnar Mulloy	13	4	6	6	6
(Belgium) Philippe Washer	15	6	3	4	1
(United Kingdom) John Horn	6	6	3	7
(Dominion of Ceylon) Doug Scharenguivel	2	1	6	5
(Argentina) Heraldo Weiss	6	2	9	6
(United Kingdom) Murray Deloford	4	6	7	2
(Italy) Fausto Gardini	4	6	6	6
(United Kingdom) Headley Baxter	6	2	1	2

Second round
1	(Australia) F Sedgman	6	7	6	7
Q	(Sweden) S Davidson	4	9	4	2
(Norway) S Lie	4	4	5
(United States) S Clark	6	6	7
9	(United States) G Mulloy	6	6	6
(United Kingdom) J Horn	4	0	4
(Argentina) H Weiss	2	6	6	4
(Italy) F Gardini	6	3	8	6

Third round
1	(Australia) F Sedgman	8	11	6
(United States) S Clark	6	9	3
9	(United States) G Mulloy	5	6	4	4
(Italy) F Gardini	7	3	6	6

Fourth round
1	(Australia) F Sedgman	6	6	6
(Italy) F Gardini	0	2	1

==== Section 2 ====
First round
5	(United States) Herbie Flam	6	6	6
(India) Naresh Kumar	1	2	2
(United Kingdom) Geoff Ward	2	3	3
(Poland) Czesław Spychała	6	6	6
(United Kingdom) Peter Hare	4	2	1
(United Kingdom) Henry Billington	6	6	6
(South Africa) Sydney Levy	6	4	6	0	4
(France) Jean-Claude Molinari	3	6	4	6	6
(Spain) Jaime Bartrolí	6	6	6	3
(France) Philippe Chatrier	8	8	4	6
(Socialist Federal Republic of Yugoslavia) Petko Milojković	2	1	6	6	3
(Austria) Freddie Huber	6	6	3	2	6
(United Kingdom) Douglas Snart	0	1	8
(Netherlands) Hans van Swol	6	6	10
(Egypt) Adli El Shafei	6	6	6
Q	(Hungary) András Kálmán	4	4	4

Second round
5	(United States) H Flam	6	6	6
(Poland) C Spychała	0	1	2
(United Kingdom) H Billington	6	6	4	8
(France) J-C Molinari	2	3	6	6
(France) P Chatrier	6	6	2	1	8
(Austria) A Huber	4	2	6	6	6
(Netherlands) A van Swol	7	6	6
(Egypt) A El Shafei	5	3	1

Third round
5	(United States) H Flam	6	6	6
(United Kingdom) H Billington	3	4	4
(France) P Chatrier	4	3	4
(Netherlands) A van Swol	6	6	6

Fourth round
5	(United States) H Flam	6	6	6
(Netherlands) A van Swol	2	2	3

==== Section 3 ====
First round
3	(United States) Art Larsen	6	6	0	6
(Australia) Mervyn Rose	1	2	6	1
(United States) Hal Burrows	3	3	2
(United Kingdom) Geoffrey Paish	6	6	6
(United States) Gene Garrett	6	6	7
(Italy) Marcello del Bello	4	0	5
Q	(United Kingdom) Bill Hough	1	0	1
(Socialist Federal Republic of Yugoslavia) Josip Palada	6	6	6
(Czechoslovakia) Milan Matouš	1	2	6	6	6
(France) Robert Haillet	6	6	2	1	0
(United Kingdom) Ron Reeve	3	9	4
(United Kingdom) Howard Walton	6	11	6
(Sweden) Torsten Johansson	6	6	6
(Switzerland) Erwin Balestra	0	0	1
(United Kingdom) Derek Bull	4	2	9	6	6
(Iran) Matthew Mohtadi	6	6	7	3	3

Second round
3	(United States) A Larsen	6	6	12
(United Kingdom) G Paish	3	1	10
(United States) W Garrett	6	6	6
(Socialist Federal Republic of Yugoslavia) J Palada	3	3	2
(Czechoslovakia) M Matouš	6	6	6
(United Kingdom) H Walton	1	3	2
(Sweden) T Johansson	6	5	6	6
(United Kingdom) D Bull	1	7	4	4

Third round
3	(United States) A Larsen	6	6	3	6
(United States) W Garrett	3	3	6	3
(Czechoslovakia) M Matouš	3	7	4
(Sweden) T Johansson	6	9	6

Fourth round
3	(United States) A Larsen	6	7	6
(Sweden) T Johansson	3	5	4

==== Section 4 ====
First round
6	(United States) Dick Savitt	6	6	6
(South Africa) Nigel Cockburn	2	2	2
(United Kingdom) Edmund David	6	6	6
(United Kingdom) Lawrence Dundas	0	4	4
(Denmark) Kurt Nielsen	6	7	6	6
(Canada) Brendan Macken	3	9	3	2
(United Kingdom) Charles Fawcus	2	6	2	3
(Belgium) Jacques Peten	6	4	6	6
(Poland) Władysław Skonecki	7	6	6
Q	(United Kingdom) Roy Mansell	5	1	1
(Poland) Ignacy Tłoczyński
(Portugal) José Roquette	w/o
(Hungary) József Asbóth	4	10	6	6
(West Germany) Ernst Buchholz	6	8	3	2
(Hong Kong) Ip Koon Hung	4	6	6	5	2
(Czechoslovakia) Vladimír Černík	6	4	4	7	6

Second round
6	(United States) R Savitt	6	6	6
(United Kingdom) E David	1	1	1
(Denmark) K Nielsen	6	6	7
(Belgium) J Peten	4	1	5
(Poland) W Skonecki	6	6	6
(Poland) I Tłoczyński	3	4	4
(Hungary) J Asbóth	6	9	1	11	6
(Czechoslovakia) V Černík	1	11	6	9	3

Third round
6	(United States) R Savitt	6	1	6	8	6
(Denmark) K Nielsen	4	6	3	10	4
(Poland) W Skonecki	5	6	8	6	2
(Hungary) J Asbóth	7	3	10	4	6

Fourth round
6	(United States) R Savitt	6	6	6
(Hungary) J Asbóth	4	2	3

=== Bottom half ===
==== Section 5 ====
First round
(Belgium) Ivan Devroe	2	3	2
(France) Bernard Destremau	6	6	6
(Philippines) Cesar Carmona	6	3	8	4	2
(Italy) Rolando del Bello	1	6	6	6	6
(United Kingdom) Darrell Shaw	3	6	6	5	6
Q	(United States) Jack Morison	6	4	2	7	1
(United Kingdom) Gerry Oakley	6	6	8
(Federation of Malaya) Ong Chew Bee	3	4	6
(Sweden) Bengt Axelsson	6	6	6
Q	(United Kingdom) Bernard Crouch	1	2	4
(Jamaica) Frank Mott-Trille	4	4	4
(South Africa) Stanley Davidson	6	6	6
(United Kingdom) Paddy Roberts	6	2	3
(Australia) Don Candy	8	6	6
(United Kingdom) Roland Carter	1	0	3
8	(South Africa) Eric Sturgess	6	6	6

Second round
(France) B Destremau	2	6	6	9
(Italy) R del Bello	6	4	2	7
(United Kingdom) D Shaw	1	4	3
(United Kingdom) G Oakley	6	6	6
(Sweden) B Axelsson	6	6	6
(South Africa) S Davidson	3	3	2
(Australia) D Candy	3	6	6	2
8	(South Africa) E Sturgess	6	4	8	6

Third round
(France) B Destremau	6	6	6
(United Kingdom) G Oakley	4	1	4
(Sweden) B Axelsson	6	0	4	2
8	(South Africa) E Sturgess	4	6	6	6

Fourth round
(France) B Destremau	2	3	2
8	(South Africa) E Sturgess	6	6	6

==== Section 6 ====
First round
(Republic of Ireland) Joe Hackett	4	4	5
(Sweden) Staffan Stockenberg	6	6	7
(Switzerland) Jost Spitzer	4	3	4
(South Africa) Abe Segal	6	6	6
(Egypt) Marcel Coen	0	1	4
(United Kingdom) Claude Lister	6	6	6
(Brazil) Armando Vieira	7	6	8
(Australia) Don Tregonning	5	4	6
(United Kingdom) Tony Clark	6	2	1	2
(United Kingdom) Tommy Anderson	4	6	6	6
(South Africa) Robert Connor	5	6	1	7	4
(Socialist Federal Republic of Yugoslavia) Vladimir Petrović	7	2	6	5	6
Q	(Netherlands) Fred Dehnert	2	3	2
(United States) Ham Richardson	6	6	6
(South Africa) David Lurie	1	1	4
4	(United States) Budge Patty	6	6	6

Second round
(Sweden) S Stockenberg	6	7	4	6
(South Africa) A Segal	1	5	6	4
(United Kingdom) C Lister	4	4	6	3
(Brazil) A Vieira	6	6	1	6
(United Kingdom) T Anderson	6	6	4	6	1
(Socialist Federal Republic of Yugoslavia) V Petrović	2	8	6	0	6
(United States) H Richardson	4	6	4	10	6
4	(United States) J Patty	6	3	6	8	4

Third round
(Sweden) S Stockenberg	6	3	6
(Brazil) A Vieira	8	6	8
(Socialist Federal Republic of Yugoslavia) V Petrović	6	0	2	5
(United States) H Richardson	2	6	6	7

Fourth round
(Brazil) A Vieira	6	1	6	6
(United States) H Richardson	3	6	3	0

==== Section 7 ====
First round
(Czechoslovakia) Bohuslav Hykš	2	0	0
(Netherlands) Ivo Rinkel	6	6	6
Q	(South Africa) Johann Kupferburger	5	3	0
(South Africa) Leon Norgarb	7	6	6
(France) Paul Rémy	6	7	6
(Socialist Federal Republic of Yugoslavia) Milan Branović	3	5	2
(Republic of Ireland) Bruce Haughton	2	6	5
(Australia) Peter Cawthorn	6	8	7
(Austria) Hans Redl	6	6	4	6
(France) Jean Becker	1	1	6	0
(South Africa) David Samaai	6	4	6	2	6
Q	(France) Michel Lemasson	4	6	3	6	4
(Canada) Lorne Main	6	6	6
(United Kingdom) John Barrett	0	2	1
(India) Narendra Nath	6	1	6	2
7	(Australia) Ken McGregor	8	6	3	6

Second round
(Netherlands) I Rinkel	4	10	4
(South Africa) L Norgarb	6	12	6
(France) P Rémy	6	6	6
(Australia) Peter Cawthorn	3	3	3
(Austria) H Redl	6	5	5	3
(South Africa) D Samaai	3	7	7	6
(Canada) L Main	3	5	5
7	(Australia) K McGregor	6	7	7

Third round
(South Africa) L Norgarb	6	4	3	6	2
(France) P Rémy	3	6	6	3	6
(South Africa) D Samaai	1	4	1
7	(Australia) K McGregor	6	6	6

Fourth round
(France) P Rémy	4	6	3	4
7	(Australia) K McGregor	6	3	6	6

==== Section 8 ====
First round
(Italy) Giovanni Cucelli	6	6	6
(United Kingdom) Norman Kitovitz	2	2	3
(New Zealand) Athol Tills	6	6	1	6
(United Kingdom) George Godsell	1	4	6	4
(Philippines) Felicisimo Ampon	6	6	6
(United Kingdom) Dick Guise	1	0	0
(United Kingdom) Tony Starte	2	1	0
10	(Sweden) Lennart Bergelin	6	6	6
(Norway) Finn Søhol	2	2	4
(United Kingdom) Tony Mottram	6	6	6
(United Kingdom) Tadeusz Slawek	0	2	0
(Canada) Henri Rochon	6	6	6
(Belgium) Jacques Brichant	5	4	3
(Denmark) Torben Ulrich	7	6	6
(West Germany) Gottfried von Cramm	7	4	4
2	(Egypt) Jaroslav Drobný	9	6	6

Second round
(Italy) G Cucelli	6	6	6
(New Zealand) A Tills	3	1	4
(Philippines) F Ampon	6	6	2	7	3
10	(Sweden) L Bergelin	2	2	6	9	6
(United Kingdom) A Mottram	6	6	7
(Canada) H Rochon	0	3	5
(Denmark) T Ulrich	9	6	3	4
2	(Egypt) J Drobný	11	1	6	6

Third round
(Italy) G Cucelli	7	2	4	3
10	(Sweden) L Bergelin	5	6	6	6
(United Kingdom) A Mottram	5	6	2	7	8
2	(Egypt) J Drobný	7	4	6	5	6

Fourth round
10	(Sweden) L Bergelin	6	6	6
(United Kingdom) A Mottram	1	0	2

Preceded by 1951 French Championships	Grand Slams; Men's Singles	Succeeded by 1951 U.S. Championships
