= Bengt Axelsson =

Swedish tennis player (born 1929)

- Country (sports): Sweden
- Born: 12 November 1929
- Turned pro: 1946 (amateur tour)
- Retired: 1965
- Plays: Right–handed

Singles
- Career record: 58–65
- Career titles: 3

Grand Slam singles results
- Wimbledon: 3R (1951)

Grand Slam doubles results
- Wimbledon: 2R (1951)

Bengt Axelsson (born 12 November 1929) was a Swedish tennis player.

== Tennis career ==
Axelsson represented Sweden in one Davis Cup tie, the 1956 Europe Zone second round tie against Norway that was played in Oslo. Axelsson and his teammates, Sven Davidson, Ulf Schmidt and Torsten Johansson won the tie 5–0, with Axelsson beating Nils-Erik Hessen in the final singles rubber.

He played at the 1951 Wimbledon Championships and reached the third round before losing to Eric Sturgess in four sets. He also partnered Staffan Stockenberg in reaching the second round in the doubles events.

Axelsson won three tournaments during 1951. At the Menton Open he was victorious against his compatriot, Bertil Blomquist in the final. He also won the amateur tournaments in Glamorgan and Harrogate, by beating the South African, Johann Kupferburger in both finals.

== See also ==
- List of Sweden Davis Cup team representatives
