= South West India Championships =

Defunct tennis tournament
- Founded: 1949; 77 years ago
- Abolished: 1970; 56 years ago
- Location: Cochin; Trivandrum
- Surface: Clay

The South West India Championships Also known as the South West India International Championships was a combined men's and women's tennis tournament, founded in 1949. The championships were played in Cochin and Trivandrum, Kerala, India. The championships ran until 1970 before they was discontinued.

== History ==
Tennis was introduced to India in the 1880s by British Army and Civilian Officers. In 1949 the South West India Championships were founded in Trivandrum, Kerala. The championships ran until 1970 before they was discontinued.

== Finals ==
=== Mens singles ===
(incomplete roll)

South West India Championships
Year	Location	Champion	Runner-up	Score
↓ ILTF World Circuit ↓
1950	Trivandrum	(Czechoslovakia) Vladimír Černík	(India) Govindji Vasant	6–3, 6–3, 6–1
1951	Trivandrum	(United States) Fred Kovaleski	(Sweden) Sven Davidson	7–9, 2–6, 7–5, 6–1, 6–1
1955	Trivandrum	(Poland) Wladyslaw Skonecki	(Australia) Jack Arkinstall	6–2, 1–6, 6–3, 9–7
1956	Trivandrum	(Poland) Wladyslaw Skonecki (2)	(Australia) Jack Arkinstall	6–2, 1–6, 6–3, 9–7
1958	Trivandrum	(United Kingdom) Billy Knight	(United Kingdom) Tony Pickard	6–2, 6–3, 6–2
1967	Cochin	(India) Ramanathan Krishnan	(Brazil) Thomaz Koch	6–4, 4–6, 7–5, 7–5
1968	Cochin	(United States) Bill Tym	(Sweden) Ulf Schmidt	2–6, 6–3, 8–6,
↓ Open era ↓
1969	Trivandrum	(United States) Bill Tym (2)	(India) Vijay Amritraj	6–3, 6–1, 3–6, 6–3
