= Don Tregonning =

Australian tennis player (1928–2022)

Donald Philip Tregonning OAM
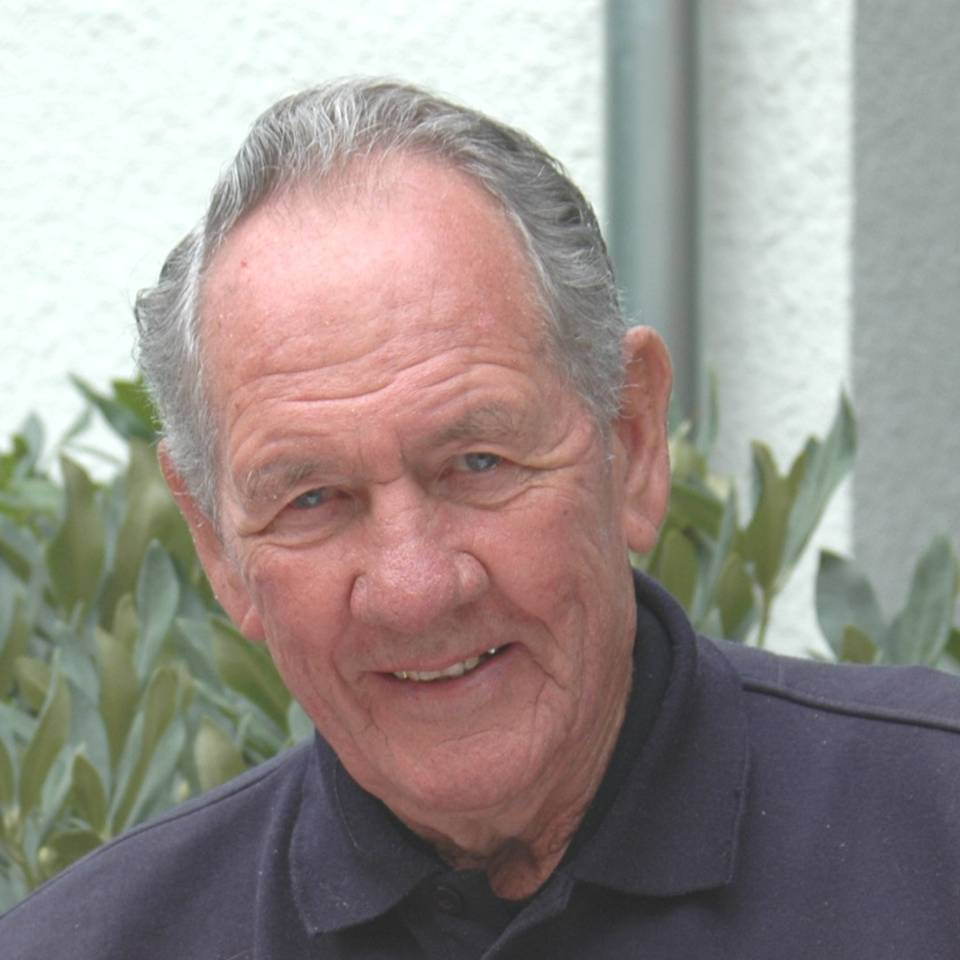
- Born: 26 November 1928; Melbourne, Victoria, Australia
- Died: 14 September 2022 (aged 93); Melbourne, Victoria, Australia
- Other name: Don
- Education: Swinburne University
- Occupations: Tennis Player, Tennis Coach
- Organization: Tennis Coaches Australia
- Spouse: Claire (Wendy) Tregonning
- Children: Carol, Philip, Christopher, Craig, John
- Honours: Medal of the Order of Australia (2019 Queen's Birthday List)
- Tennis career
- Country (sports): Australia
- Height: 6 ft 1 in (185 cm)

Other tournaments
- Wembley Pro: QF (1953)

Grand Slam doubles results
- Australian Open: QF (1949, 1953)

Grand Slam mixed doubles results
- Australian Open: SF (1953)

Signature
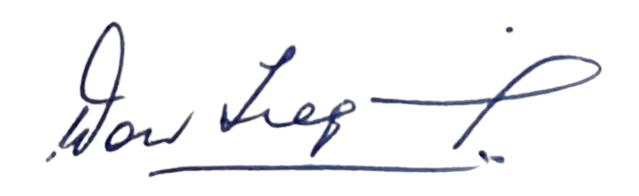

Donald Philip Tregonning OAM (26 November 1928 – 14 September 2022) was an Australian professional tennis player and coach. Tregonning, a student of Melbourne coach Mick Sweetnam, was a member of the international amateur and professional tennis communities, reaching the mixed doubles semi finals of the 1953 Australian Open, playing twice in the quarter-finals of doubles competitions at the Australian Open (1949, 1953) and reaching the quarter-finals of the Wembley Professional Championships in 1953. Tregonning played in a famous 1953 Australian Championships Round 1 match in which the umpire left the grounds to "go to (his) tea".

Tregonning is the former head-coach at Kooyong Lawn Tennis Club (then the site of the Australian Open), Danish national coach, and for 30 years he coached the Japan national team and helped them to a 3–2 upset over Australia in the "Australian Davis Cup". His clientele included Wimbledon finalist Kurt Nielsen, Wimbledon Ladies' Doubles Champion Angela Buxton, British Davis Cup player Bobby Wilson, Ashleigh Barty's coach Craig Tyzzer, Grand Slam competitor Elizabeth Peers-Little, Australian Open doubles finalist Cliff Letcher, Grand Slam competitor Greg Whitecross and "Australian Junior" finalists Bill Durham, Trevor Little, Sally Irvine.

== Personal life ==
Donald Philip Tregonning was born on 26 November 1928 in Melbourne, Victoria, Australia. In his childhood, he first played Australian Rules football and later discovered tennis as his passion. Tregonning became a member at Grace Park Tennis Club and joined the Mick Sweetnam School of Coaching. Sweetnam regarded Tregonning as more promising than his other student seven time Grand Slam champion Mervyn Rose.

Tregonning studied engineering at the Swinburne University of Technology, Melbourne.

Tregonning married fellow Australian and nursing sister Claire Wendy Heskett at the Church of Our Lady, London. They have one daughter and four sons. All sons have continued on to become ATP ranked players and professional coaches. Claire Wendy Tregonning, née Heskett, died in 2013.

In the 2019 Queen's Birthday Honours (Australia), Tregonning received the Medal of the Order of Australia (OAM).

== Playing career ==
In 1948 Tregonning played in the Australian Championships, losing to Jack Crawford in a four set Round 2 match. The same year he partnered Mervyn Rose in the Australian Championships doubles competition again reaching Round 2. In 1949 Tregonning lost a Round 2 Australian Championships match against Bill Sidwell, but partnering Rose was able to secure a spot in the quarter-finals of the doubles competition. In the 1950 Australian Championships Tregonning once again reached the second round, however, losing a first round doubles match in which he partnered Philip Brophy.

Tregonning received direct entry into the Men's Singles draw of the 1951 Wimbledon Championships but lost in the first round to Brazilian Armando Vieira. Tregonning partnered Peter Cawthorn in the Men's Doubles and reached the third round, including a first round win against Vieira and his partner Leon Norgarb. Partnering Rosemary Bulleid he reached the third round in the Mixed Doubles. Tregonning returned to Wimbledon in 1952, but was defeated in the first round of the Men's Singles by Douglas Scharenguivel. He again partnered Cawthorn in the doubles event, but they were defeated in the first round by Americans Irvin Dorfman and Grant Golden. He was, once again, more successful in the Mixed Doubles reaching the third round together with Gem Hoahing.

In 1953 Tregonning played at the Wembley Professional Championships, then the most prominent professional tennis tournament. He was able to secure a place in the quarter-finals being defeated by fellow Australian tennis legend Frank Sedgman.

Tregonning was the runner-up at the 1954 English Professional Championships and 1955 Great Britain Professional Championships.

=== Australian Championships match without an umpire ===
Tregonning played in a famous 1953 Australian Championships Rd1 match in which the umpire left the grounds to "go to (his) tea," leaving the two players – Tregonning and fellow Australian Brian Tobin – without an umpire or any ball boys. Harold Cornish, the President of the Victorian Umpires Association, took over, although by this time most of the spectators had left with only eight spectators and three representatives of the press remaining.

== Coaching career ==
In 1953 Tregonning travelled to England and partnered with Peter Cawthorn in organising and setting up a tennis school. In 1955 he was appointed Danish national coach, being tasked with preparing the Danish Davis Cup team. Among Tregonning's students was Kurt Nielsen who went on to play in the finals of 1955 Wimbledon competitions becoming the first Dane to play in a Men's singles final of a Grand Slam tournament.

Tregonning was head-professional at Fawkner Park Tennis Courts and for 20 years the head-coach at Kooyong Lawn Tennis Club, which was then the site of the Australian Open. In February 1956 he and five others founded the Professional Tennis Association of Victoria, which later changed its name to Tennis Coaches Australia Victoria, Inc. (TCAV) in 1973. On several occasions Tregonning managed Linton Cup and Wilson Cup teams, before turning to private school coaching at St. Catherine's, Methodist Ladies' College, Mount Scopus Memorial College and others.

The Australian Davis Cup team was under Tregonning's supervision in 1969. When Harry Hopman was establishing his tennis academy in 1970 and later his International Tennis Camp Tregonning travelled to the United States to assist him in doing so and coaching at the academy and camp.

During his 30 years coaching the Japan national team Tregonning coached Japanese Olympic quarter finalist Jun Kamiwazumi who would go on to play in the quarter-finals of the French Open mixed doubles competitions and Japanese player Toshiro Sakai who would go on to become a four time Asiad gold medalist and French Open doubles quarter finalist. Both players later beat the Australian Davis Cup team in the "Australian Davis Cup".

Students of Tregonning included Australian junior champion Cliff Letcher who would become a US Open doubles finalist and two time Australian Open doubles finalist and 1979 Australian Open boys' singles and doubles champion Greg Whitecross.

In the 1990s Tregonning took on coaching squads from the Philippines, Japan and China.

In 2010 Tregonning was inducted into the TCAV Hall of Fame with the status of Legend and Founding Member.

Tregonning retired to coaching from his private court at his home in Templestowe, Melbourne. He died on 14 September 2022 at Austin Hospital, Melbourne.

== Tournament results ==
=== Wembley Professional Championships ===
Singles
| Year | Round | Opponent | Score |
|---|---|---|---|
| 1953 | 1 | William John (Bill) Moss | 6-1, 2-6, 6-4 |
| | QF | Frank Arthur Sedgman | 0-6, 3-6 |

=== Grand Slams ===
==== Australian Championships ====
Singles
| Year | Round | Opponent | Score |
|---|---|---|---|
| 1948 | 1 | Thomas Pye | 8-6, 9-7, 9-7 |
| | 2 | Jack Crawford | 4-6, 3-6, 6-3, 3-6 |
| 1949 | 1 | Don Goodger | 6-3, 3-6, 0-6, 6-2, 6-3 |
| | 2 | Bill Sidwell | 2-6, 1-6, 1-6 |
| 1950 | 1 | Anthony Maggs | 6-4, 7-5, 6-1 |
| | 2 | John Mehaffey | 0-6, 4-6, 6-3, 3-6 |
| 1953 | 1 | Brian Tobin | 4-6, 7-5, 8-6, 3-6, 4-6 |
| | 2 | Ken Rosewall | 2-6, 3-6, 6-4, 3-6 |

Doubles
| Year | Partner | Round | Opponents | Score |
|---|---|---|---|---|
| 1948 | Mervyn Rose | 1 | Colin Pym, Ken Slater | 6-4, 6-4, 5-7, 2-6, 12-10 |
| | | 2 | Max Bonner, Tom Warhurst | 6-1, 2-6, 6-4, 1-6, 1-6 |
| 1949 | Mervyn Rose | 1 | | |
| | | 2 | Arthur Liddle, Gordon Schwartz | 6-4, 6-4, 8-10, 6-4 |
| | | QF | Geoffrey Brown, Bill Sidwell | 3-6, 4-6, 2-6 |
| 1950 | Philip Brophy | 1 | John Bromwich, Adrian Quist | 6-3, 6-0, 6-1 |
| 1953 | David Yates | 1 | Max Anderson, John O'Brien | 6-1, 7-5, 4-6, 10-8 |
| | | QF | Lew Hoad, Ken Rosewall | 3-6, 5-7, 7-9 |

Mixed Doubles
| Year | Partner | Round | Opponents | Score |
|---|---|---|---|---|
| 1948 | J. Williams | 1 | Sadie Newcombe, Maurice Newcombe | 2-6, 2-6 |
| 1949 | Dulcie Whittaker | 1 | Eileen Richardson, Ray Cock | 6-1. 2-6, 5-7 |
| 1950 | Esme Ashford | 1 | Margaret O'Donnell, Frank Lonergan | 6-2, 6-1 |
| | | 2 | Nancye Bolton, Colin Long | 0-6, 1-6 |
| 1953 | Pam Southcombe | 1 | Joy O'Donoghue, Tim Cawthorn | 6-1, 6-3 |
| | | QF | Joyce Diggle, John Diggle | 6-1, 6-4 |
| | | SF | Maureen Connolly, Ham Richardson | 0-6, 4-6 |

==== Wimbledon ====
Singles
| Year | Round | Opponent | Score |
|---|---|---|---|
| 1951 | 1 | Armando Vieira | 5-7, 4-6, 6-8 |
| 1952 | 1 | Doug Scharenguivel | 2-6, 3-6, 4-6 |

Doubles
| Year | Partner | Round | Opponents | Score |
|---|---|---|---|---|
| 1951 | Peter Cawthorn | 1 | Leon Norgarb, Armando Vieira | 6-3, 6-1, 9-7 |
| | | 2 | Jean Becker, G. Mercier | 6-1, 6-0, 6-3 |
| | | 3 | Jaroslav Drobny, Eric Sturgess | 1-6, 2-6, 6-8 |
| 1952 | Peter Cawthorn | 1 | Irvin Dorfman, Grant Golden | 6-4, 3-6, 1-6, 2-6 |

Mixed Doubles
| Year | Partner | Round | Opponents | Score |
|---|---|---|---|---|
| 1951 | Rosemary Bulleid | 1 | | |
| | | 2 | Ron Statham, Helen Fletcher | 6-4, 3-6, 6-1 |
| | | 3 | Hans van Swol, Jean Walker-Smith | 6-2, 1-6, 3-6 |
| 1952 | Gem Hoahing | 1 | | |
| | | 2 | Bob Lee, Norma Seacy | 6-4, 5-7, 6-2 |
| | | 3 | Ricky Morea, Thelma Long | 1-6, 2-6 |

=== Other professional tournament results (UK) ===
==== British Professional ====
Singles
| Year | Round | Opponent | Score |
|---|---|---|---|
| 1954 | 4 | Kurt Pohmann | 7-5, 2-6, 6-2, 1-6, 2-6 |
| 1955 | 2 | Peter Cawthorn | 1-6, 5-7, 5-7 |

==== English professional championships ====
Singles
| Year | Round | Opponent | Score |
|---|---|---|---|
| 1954 | QF | E.H. Fenton | 6-4, 7-5, 6-4 |
| | SF | William John (Bill) Moss | 6-2, 6-2, 3-6, 7-5 |
| | F | Arthur Gordon (Paddy) Roberts | 2-6, 6-1, 4-6, 3-6 |

==== Great Britain Professional Championships ====
Singles
| Year | Round | Opponent | Score |
|---|---|---|---|
| 1955 | SF | William John (Bill) Moss | 6-2, 7-5, 6-2 |
| | F | Arthur Gordon (Paddy) Roberts | 5-7, 3-6, 4-6 |
