= Straight Clark =

American tennis player

- Full name: Louis Straight Clark
- Country (sports): United States
- Born: February 10, 1925; Des Moines, Iowa, U.S.
- Died: February 10, 1995 (aged 70); Haverford, Pennsylvania, U.S.

Singles
- Career record: 320-105
- Career titles: 37
- Highest ranking: 4

Grand Slam singles results
- Australian Open: QF (1953)
- French Open: QF (1951)
- Wimbledon: 4R (1952)
- US Open: QF (1952)

Doubles

Grand Slam doubles results
- Australian Open: QF (1953)
- Wimbledon: 3R (1951, 1952)

Mixed doubles

Team competitions
- Davis Cup: W (1954)

Louis Straight Clark (February 10, 1925 – February 10, 1995) was an American tennis player in the mid-20th century. Clark was once ranked world No. 4 in men's singles. He was ranked the No. 5 American player by the USTA for 1953.

He was born in Des Moines, Iowa. He played college tennis at the University of Southern California.

A member of the US Davis Cup team, he was 5–0 in matches in 1953 and 1954 (and the latter year, a member of the winning team).

Clark won five tournaments in the 1951 season, including the singles title in Monte Carlo in 1951 after a five-set win in the final against compatriot Fred Kovaleski. That same year he defeated Whitney Reed to reach the final of the Pennsylvania State tennis championship, only to fall to future Hall of Famer Vic Seixas. In 1952 he won the Western India Tennis Championships in Bombay against Władysław Skonecki.

In 1954, he won the singles title at the tournament in Cincinnati Masters, defeating Sammy Giammalva, Sr., in the final in three straight sets.

He reached the final at the Newport Casino Invitational in 1954, only to lose to Ham Richardson in five sets, in a match that lasted more than four hours.

When he teamed with fellow American Hal Burrows, the pair became one of the top doubles teams of their time. They reached the finals of the U.S. Clay Court Championship, and the semifinals of the U.S. Nationals, upsetting the team of future International Hall of Famers Ken Rosewall and Lew Hoad in the quarterfinals. Clark and Burrows also reached the quarterfinals at the French National Championships, Rome and Wimbledon.
