= 1951 Wimbledon Championships – Girls' singles =

Girls' singles
- 1951 Wimbledon Championships

Final
- Champion: (United Kingdom) Lorna Cornell
- Runner-up: (Italy) Silvana Lazzarino
- Score: 6–3, 6–4

Details
- Draw: 12

Events
Singles	men	women		boys	girls
Doubles	men	women	mixed	boys	girls
← 1950 ·	Wimbledon Championships	· 1952 →

Lorna Cornell defeated Silvana Lazzarino in the final, 6–3, 6–4 to win the girls' singles tennis title at the 1951 Wimbledon Championships.

== Draw ==
=== Key ===
- Q = Qualifier
- WC = Wild card
- LL = Lucky loser
- Alt = Alternate
- SE = Special exempt
- PR = Protected ranking
- ITF = ITF entry
- JE = Junior exempt
- w/o = Walkover
- r = Retired
- d = Defaulted
- SR = Special ranking

=== Draw ===
First round
(United Kingdom) Lorna Cornell	9	4	7
(Republic of Ireland) June Fitzpatrick	7	6	5
(Belgium) C Maes	6	6
(Socialist Federal Republic of Yugoslavia) T Lourens	1	0
(West Germany) M Paas	7	9
(Sweden) M Molin	5	7
(Netherlands) T van Dalsum	6	6
(United Kingdom) N Hure	2	4

Quarterfinals
(Luxembourg) M Weber	1	1
(United Kingdom) Lorna Cornell	6	6
(Belgium) C Maes	5	7	6
(West Germany) M Paas	7	2	2
(Netherlands) T van Dalsum	4	1
(Italy) Silvana Lazzarino	6	6
(Norway) Astrid Winther	7	8
(Denmark) S Petersen	5	6

Semifinals
(United Kingdom) Lorna Cornell	6	6
(Belgium) C Maes	1	4
(Italy) Silvana Lazzarino	6	6
(Norway) Astrid Winther	2	2

Final
(United Kingdom) Lorna Cornell	6	6
(Italy) Silvana Lazzarino	3	4
