= Vladimir Petrović (tennis) =

Croatian professional tennis player (born 1929)

- Full name: Vladimir Petrović
- Country (sports): Yugoslavia
- Born: 11 May 1929; Kingdom of Serbs, Croats and Slovenes

Singles
- Career record: 188–110
- Career titles: 15

Grand Slam singles results
- French Open: 2R (1954)
- Wimbledon: 3R (1951)

Vladimir Petrović (born 11 May 1929) is a Croatian former professional tennis player who represented Yugoslavia and later emigrated to the United States.

== Biography ==
Petrović, a three-time national champion, played Davis Cup tennis for Yugoslavia. He also competed several times at both the French Championships and Wimbledon. Although he held a law degree from the University of Zagreb, he chose not to practise law as he would have been required to join the Communist Party.

His most noted performance in a Grand Slam tournament was reaching the third round of the 1951 Wimbledon Championships. He won five set matches in both of the opening two rounds, then had his run ended by American Ham Richardson.

In 1952 he made his Davis Cup debut in a tie against Finland and also featured in a tie with Great Britain, in which he had a win over Roger Becker. The following year he took part in a tie against France in his native Croatia, where he lost a marathon five setter to Robert Haillet, but was able to defeat Robert Abdesselam in the reverse singles. He finished his Davis Cup career with an 8/10 overall record from seven ties, the last in 1955, just months before he defected.

With Yugoslavia under Communist rule, Petrović made the decision to defect in 1955. His wife Georgia, a renowned table tennis player, had temporarily left the country on a student exchange program, which gave him an opportunity to seek asylum when he travelled to England for the 1955 Wimbledon Championships. He ended up in Germany, where he remained based for the next four years. In 1958 he won the Dutch Championships and made his last appearance at Wimbledon, beaten by eventual runner-up Neale Fraser.

In 1959 he moved to Los Angeles with his family. At the LA Tennis Club(LATC) he defeated many Top US and Australian tennis players in the Pacific South West(PSW) tournament in Septembers after the US Championships in New York. His son Glenn competed on the professional tennis circuit.

== See also ==
- List of Yugoslavia Davis Cup team representatives
