= 1951 Wimbledon Championships – Boys' singles =

Boys' singles
- 1951 Wimbledon Championships

Final
- Champion: (South Africa) Johann Kupferburger
- Runner-up: (Egypt) Kamel Moubarek
- Score: 8–6, 6–4

Events
Singles	men	women		boys	girls
Doubles	men	women	mixed	boys	girls
← 1950 ·	Wimbledon Championships	· 1952 →

Johann Kupferburger defeated Kamel Moubarek in the final, 8–6, 6–4 to win the boys' singles tennis title at the 1951 Wimbledon Championships.

== Draw ==
=== Key ===
- Q = Qualifier
- WC = Wild card
- LL = Lucky loser
- Alt = Alternate
- SE = Special exempt
- PR = Protected ranking
- ITF = ITF entry
- JE = Junior exempt
- w/o = Walkover
- r = Retired
- d = Defaulted
- SR = Special ranking

=== Finals ===
Semifinals
(Egypt) Kamel Moubarek	6	6
(Pakistan) Qutab-ud-din	4	3
(South Africa) Johann Kupferburger	6	6
(Denmark) Søren Højberg	4	3

Final
(Egypt) Kamel Moubarek	6	4
(South Africa) Johann Kupferburger	8	6

=== Top half ===
First round
(Belgium) Jean-Pierre Froment	6	2	8
(United Kingdom) Jonathan Prouse	4	6	6
(Pakistan) Qutab-ud-din	0	6	8
(Austria) Fritz Jonak	6	3	6

Second round
(Egypt) Kamel Moubarek	6	6
(Israel) Gabriel Dubitzky	2	1
(Netherlands) Hendrik Goris	7	6
(Socialist Federal Republic of Yugoslavia) J Ladislav	5	1
(Spain) J Castro	4	0
(West Germany) Hans-Jürgen Baums	6	6
(Belgium) Jean-Pierre Froment	6	4	1
(Pakistan) Qutab-ud-din	4	6	6

Quarterfinals
(Egypt) Kamel Moubarek	6	9
(Netherlands) Hendrik Goris	3	7
(West Germany) Hans-Jürgen Baums	2	3
(Pakistan) Qutab-ud-din	6	6

Semifinals
(Egypt) Kamel Moubarek	6	6
(Pakistan) Qutab-ud-din	4	3

=== Bottom half ===
First round
(Pakistan) Mohammed Nassim	6	4	6
(Republic of Ireland) FJ Horne	2	6	2
(South Africa) Johann Kupferburger	4	6	6
(Brazil) LC Almeida	6	0	4
(Sweden) Ulf Schmidt	6	6
(Australia) RG Reid	4	3
(Luxembourg) F Weiwertz	6	5	6
(Greece) S Bololis	3	7	2

Second round
(Pakistan) Mohammed Nassim	3	1
(South Africa) Johann Kupferburger	6	6
(Sweden) Ulf Schmidt	6	6
(Luxembourg) F Weiwertz	2	1
(Denmark) Søren Højberg	7	6
(Norway) S Kuhnle	5	2
(France) MJ Layau	6	6
(Israel) L Davidman	1	2

Quarterfinals
(South Africa) Johann Kupferburger	6	6
(Sweden) Ulf Schmidt	2	3
(Denmark) Søren Højberg	6	6
(France) MJ Layau	4	1

Semifinals
(South Africa) Johann Kupferburger	6	6
(Denmark) Søren Højberg	4	3
