= List of Serbia Davis Cup team representatives =

This is a list of tennis players who have represented the Serbia Davis Cup team in an official Davis Cup match. Also included are those who played for the Yugoslavia Davis Cup team or the Serbia and Montenegro Davis Cup team. Serbia are considered a direct successor of both those teams and share their historical records. The player's win–loss record is their combined total, so may include matches played for Serbia while they were known as their previous names. For players who have competed for other nations, only matches played under the Serbian or its previous team flags are included. Players are ordered by the team they debuted for.

== Key ==
Lists are correct as of 20 September 2026, after the tie against the Lithuania Davis Cup team.

== Serbia (2007–present) ==
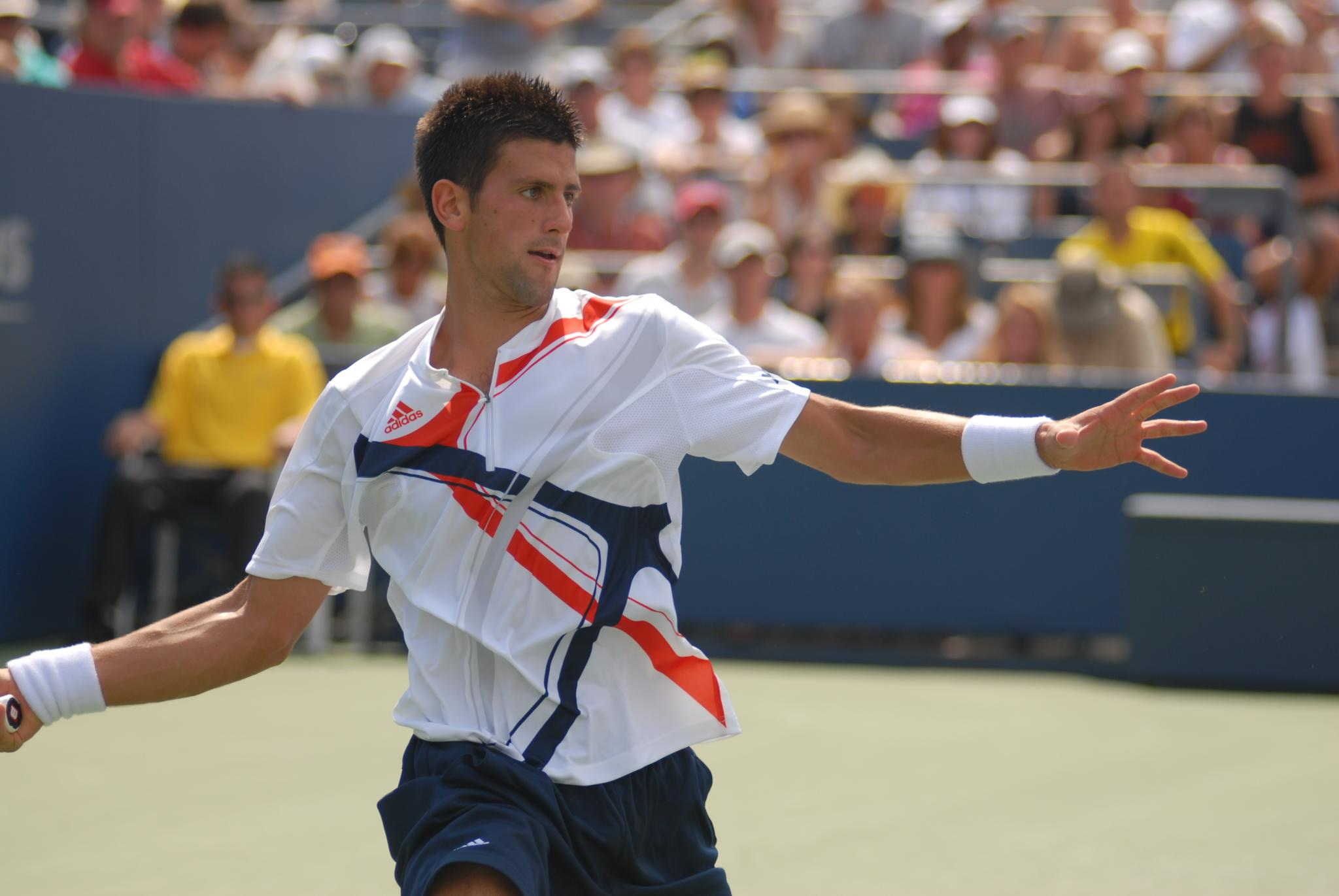
Novak Đoković

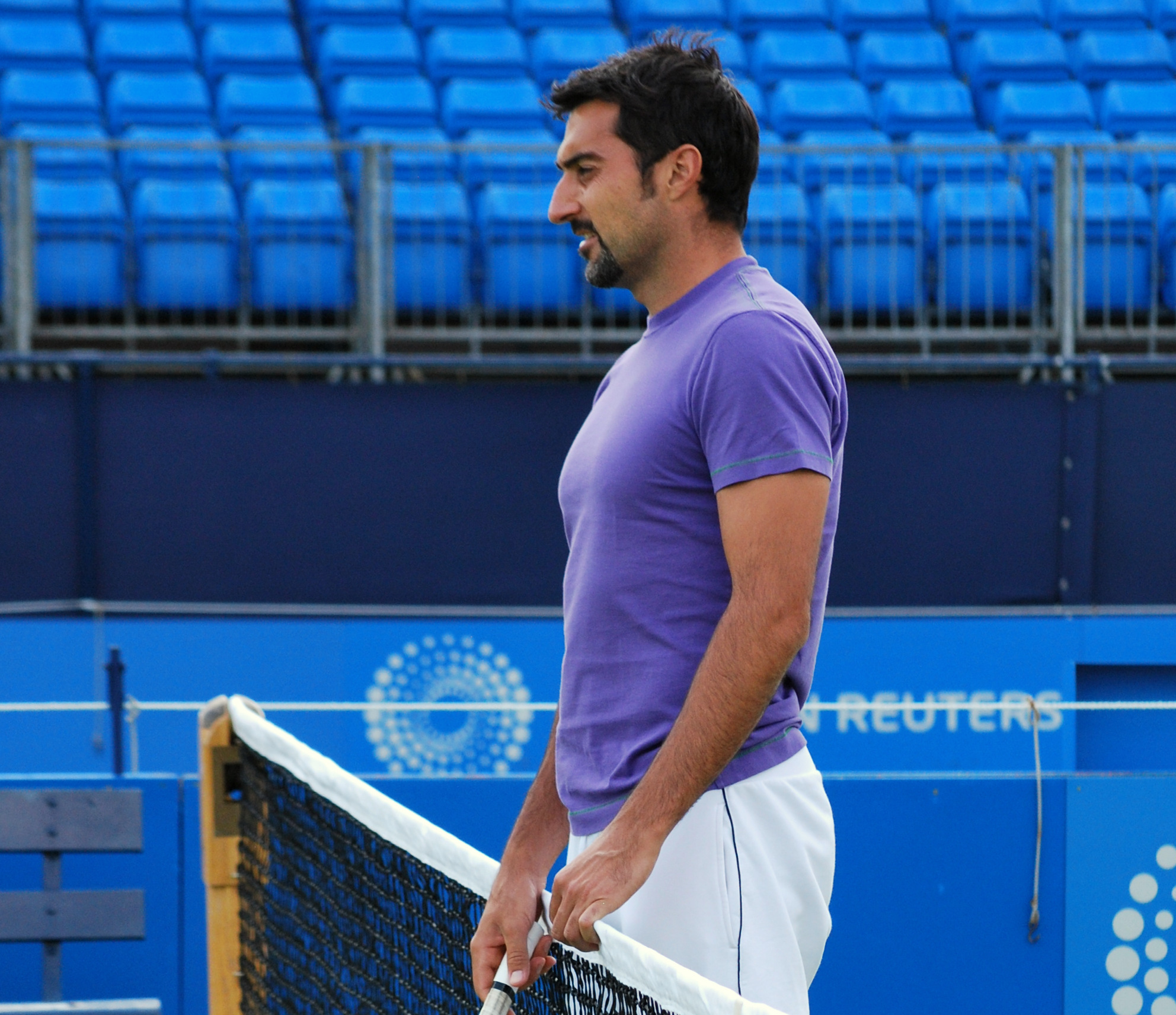
Nenad Zimonjić

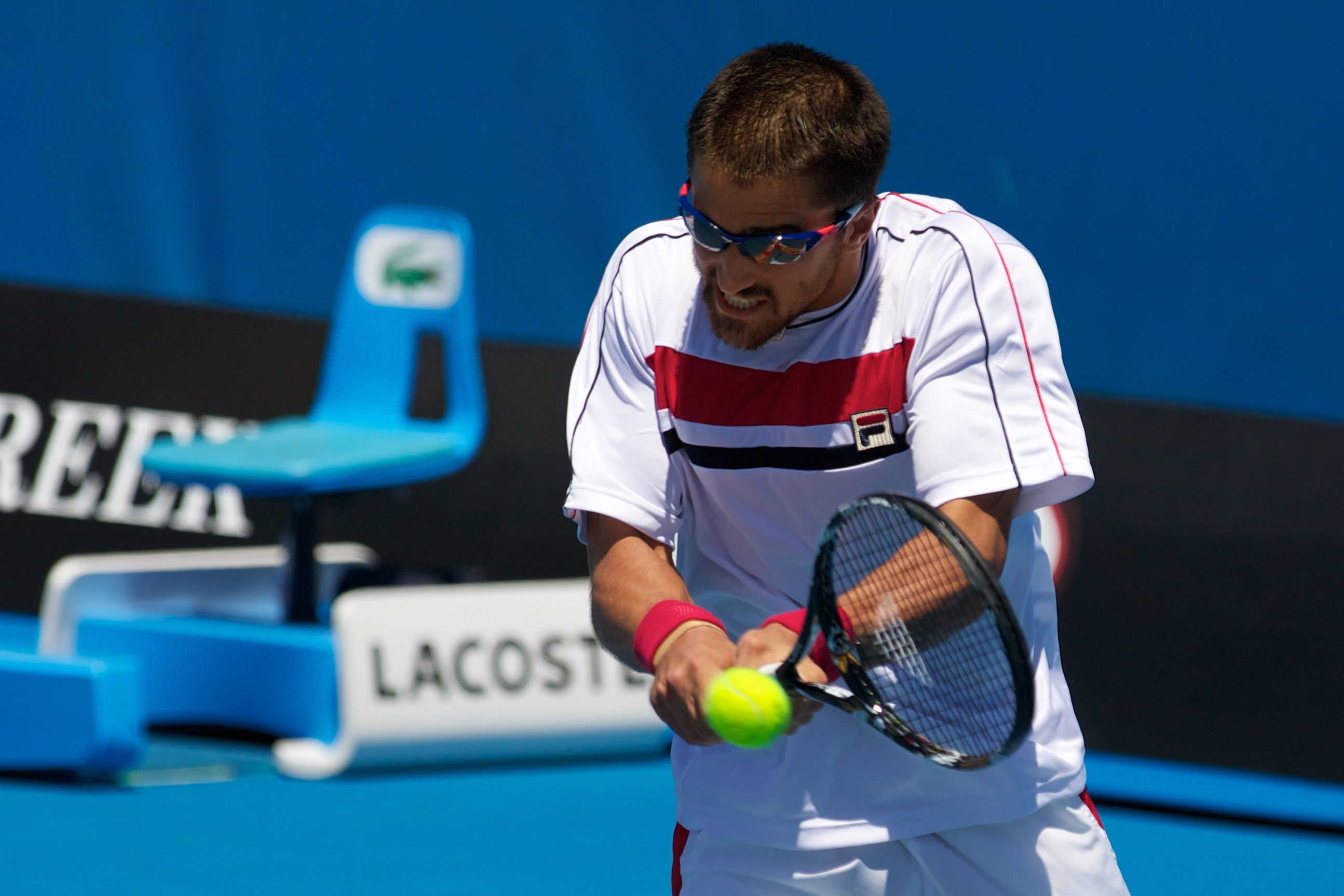
Janko Tipsarević

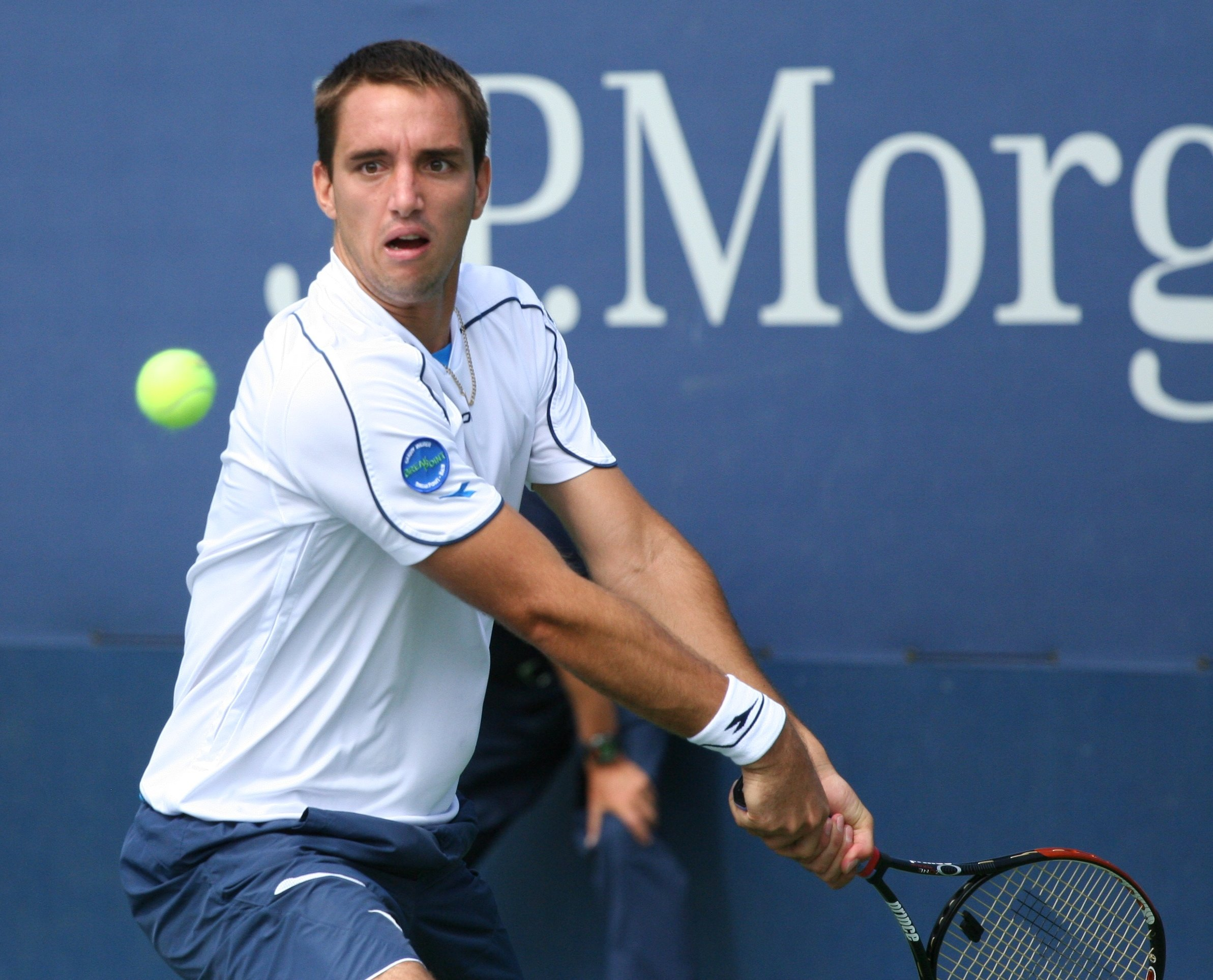
Viktor Troicki

Player	W–L (Total)	W–L (Singles)	W–L (Doubles)	Ties	Debut
Stefan Latinović	1–0	0–0	1–0	1	2026
Ognjen Milić	1–1	1–1	0–0	2	2026
Branko Đurić	0–2	0–2	0–0	2	2025
Matej Sabanov	1–1	0–0	1–1	2	2025
Ivan Sabanov	1–1	0–0	1–1	2	2025
Hamad Medjedovic	5–2	4–1	1–1	5	2023
Nikola Ćaćić	5–5	0–0	5–5	10	2021
Miomir Kecmanović	12–8	8–5	4–3	14	2021
Danilo Petrović	1–0	0–0	1–0	1	2018
Peđa Krstin	2–0	2–0	0–0	2	2018
Nikola Milojević	1–2	0–0	1–2	3	2018
Miljan Zekić	0–1	0–0	0–1	1	2018
Laslo Djere	5–5	5–5	0–0	10	2017
Filip Krajinović	11–9	8–4	3–5	16	2014
Dušan Lajović	13–14	13–13	0–1	21	2012
Viktor Troicki	24–16	17–11	7–5	24	2008

== Serbia & Montenegro (1995–2006) ==
Player	W–L (Total)	W–L (Singles)	W–L (Doubles)	Ties	Debut
Novak Djokovic	46–16	41–8	5–8	37	2004
Nikola Ćirić	1–0	0–0	1–0	1	2004
Dejan Petrović	2–1	0–0	2–1	3	2003
Boris Pašanski	6–3	6–3	0–0	6	2003
Ilija Bozoljac	7–8	3–2	4–6	13	2003
Vladimir Obradović	0–1	0–1	0–0	1	2002
Darko Mađarovski	0–1	0–0	0–1	1	2002
Janko Tipsarević	42–19	34–15	8–4	37	2000
Relja Dulić Fišer	5–1	1–1	4–0	5	2000
Nikola Gnjatović	0–3	0–2	0–1	1	1999
Vladimir Pavićević	3–2	2–2	1–0	3	1997
Dušan Vemić	20–9	11–4	9–5	18	1996
Nenad Zimonjić	43–31	13–12	30–19	55	1995
Bojan Vujić (Note: Vujić, a Bosnian Serb, played for Serbia and Montenegro (Federal Republic of Yugoslavia) from 1995 to 1997, and later for Bosnia and Herzegovina from 2004 to 2006.)	7–3	7–3	0–0	7	1995
Goran Mihajlović	1–0	1–0	0–0	1	1995

== SFR Yugoslavia (1927–1992) ==
Player	W–L (Total)	W–L (Singles)	W–L (Doubles)	Ties	Debut
Aleksandar Kitinov (Note: Kitinov represented Yugoslavia from 1991 to 1992, and later represented North Macedonia from 1992 to 2003.)	0–1	0–0	0–1	1	1992
Nebojša Djorđević	7–11	2–6	5–5	11	1992
Srđan Muškatirović	1–5	1–4	0–1	3	1991
Goran Ivanišević (Note: Ivanišević represented Yugoslavia from 1988 to 1992, and later represented Croatia from 1992 to 2004.)	15–4	8–3	7–1	8	1988
Igor Flego	0–3	0–1	0–2	2	1986
Bruno Orešar	6–8	5–8	1–0	8	1984
Goran Prpić (Note: Prpić represented Yugoslavia from 1984 to 1992, and later represented Croatia from 1992 to 1996.)	9–13	4–10	5–3	12	1983
Slobodan Živojinović	36–26	24–15	12–11	24	1981
Branko Horvat	1–2	1–2	0–0	3	1981
Zoran Petkovic	1–1	1–1	0–0	2	1980
Marko Ostoja	18–9	11–6	7–3	11	1979
Dragan Savic	3–1	2–0	1–1	2	1978
Zoltan Ilin	8–11	6–8	2–3	7	1977
Zlatko Ivančić	0–1	0–1	0–0	1	1971
Nikola Špear	8–13	5–9	3–4	7	1969
Željko Franulović	32–27	23–15	9–12	22	1967
Srdjan Jelic	2–0	2–0	0–0	2	1963
Vladimir Presecki	3–2	3–2	0–0	4	1961
Nikola Pilić	38–24	27–12	11–12	23	1961
Boro Jovanović	29–36	18–22	11–14	25	1959
Kamilo Keretic	0–3	0–3	0–0	2	1958
Aleksandar Popovic Jr.	0–1	0–0	0–1	1	1957
Sima Nikolić	0–1	0–0	0–1	1	1957
Ladislav Jagec	0–2	0–1	0–1	1	1955
Ika Panajotovic	5–15	3–12	2–3	11	1953
Ivko Plećević	3–9	2–7	1–2	6	1952
Vladimir Petrović	8–10	5–7	3–3	7	1952
Petko Milojkovic	2–1	1–0	1–1	3	1950
Milan Branović	4–4	4–4	0–0	4	1949
Stefan Laslo	1–1	1–0	0–1	2	1948
Josip Saric	0–1	0–1	0–0	1	1947
Dragutin Mitić	41–29	28–15	13–14	29	1936
Franjo Punčec	42–20	33–12	9–8	26	1933
Josip Palada	42–32	31–21	11–11	37	1933
Ivan Radović	1–1	0–0	1–1	2	1930
Franjo Kukuljević	11–21	5–9	6–12	18	1930
Krešimir Friedrich	3–3	3–2	0–1	3	1929
Franjo Šefer	5–14	3–10	2–4	7	1928
Aleksandar Popovic Sr.	0–3	0–2	0–1	1	1928
György Dungyersky	0–2	0–1	0–1	1	1927
Ivan Balas	0–2	0–1	0–1	1	1927
