= Kurt Nielsen =

Danish tennis player

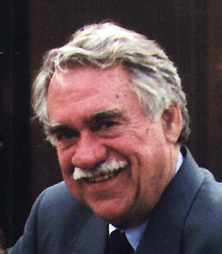
- Nielsen in 1999
- Country (sports): Denmark
- Born: 19 November 1930 Copenhagen, Denmark
- Died: 11 June 2011 (aged 80)
- Turned pro: 1960 (amateur from 1948)
- Retired: 1966
- Plays: Right-handed (one-handed backhand)
- Coach: Don Tregonning (1955)

Singles
- Career record: 205–103
- Career titles: 13
- Highest ranking: No. 7 (1953, Lance Tingay)

Grand Slam singles results
- French Open: 4R (1952, 1955, 1956, 1957, 1959)
- Wimbledon: F (1953, 1955)
- US Open: QF (1953)
- Professional majors
- Wembley Pro: 1R (1960, 1961, 1962, 1963, 1966)
- French Pro: 1R (1960, 1961, 1962, 1963, 1964, 1965)

Doubles

Grand Slam doubles results
- Wimbledon: 3R (1953, 1957)

Mixed doubles

Grand Slam mixed doubles results
- Wimbledon: F (1958)
- US Open: W (1957)

Kurt Nielsen (19 November 1930 – 11 June 2011) was a Danish tennis player. He was born in Copenhagen, and was the first Danish tennis player ever to have played in a men's singles final in a Grand Slam tournament.

Nielsen reached the singles finals of Wimbledon in 1953 (beating Ken Rosewall and Jaroslav Drobný, then losing to Vic Seixas) and 1955 (beating Rosewall, then losing to Tony Trabert). Both times he reached the final, he was unseeded. Before this, he won the boys' singles at Wimbledon in 1947 (defeating Sven Davidson). Besides his successes at Wimbledon, he won the boys' singles at the French Open and reached the quarterfinals in the U.S. Championships in 1953.

With Althea Gibson, Nielsen won the U.S. Open mixed doubles in 1957, thereby becoming the first Dane to have won a Grand Slam event. During his long career, he won around 30 international titles, played 96 Davis Cup matches for Denmark (with a 53–43 record), and holds the record of having won the most Danish national tennis championships (50). Nielsen turned professional in 1960 and played on the pro circuit.

After ending his active career, Nielsen held numerous honourable positions in leading international tennis associations as well as served as the supervisor and referee at many Grand Slam events. He was a commentator on the Danish version of the TV channel Eurosport until late 2006.

Nielsen was the grandfather of Danish tennis player Frederik Løchte Nielsen. His grandson, at the 2012 Wimbledon men's doubles event, became the second Dane to win a Grand Slam tournament.

== Grand Slam finals ==
=== Singles: (2 runner-ups) ===
Result	Year	Championship	Surface	Opponent	Score
Loss	1953	Wimbledon	Grass	(United States) Vic Seixas	7–9, 3–6, 4–6
Loss	1955	Wimbledon	Grass	(United States) Tony Trabert	3–6, 5–7, 1–6

=== Mixed doubles: (1 title, 1 runner-up) ===
Result	Year	Championship	Surface	Partner	Opponents	Score
Win	1957	US Championships	Grass	(United States) Althea Gibson	(United States) Darlene Hard (Australia) Robert Howe	6–3, 9–7
Loss	1958	Wimbledon	Grass	(United States) Althea Gibson	(Australia) Lorraine Coghlan (Australia) Robert Howe	3–6, 11–13

== Singles performance timeline ==
Key
W	F	SF	QF	#R	RR	Q#	DNQ	A	NH

(W) winner; (F) finalist; (SF) semifinalist; (QF) quarterfinalist; (#R) rounds 4, 3, 2, 1; (RR) round-robin stage; (Q#) qualification round; (DNQ) did not qualify; (A) absent; (NH) not held; (SR) strike rate (events won / competed); (W–L) win–loss record.

The following lists main draw appearances for Grand Slam and pre-Open Era Professional Major tournaments only.

Tournament	1948	1949	1950	1951	1952	1953	1954	1955	1956	1957	1958	1959	1960	1961	1962	1963	1964	1965	1966	W–L
Grand slam tournaments
Australian Championships	A	A	A	A	A	A	A	A	A	A	A	A	A	Absent; had turned pro						0–0
French Championships	3R	A	A	1R	4R^{1}	A	2R	4R^{1}	4R	4R	1R	4R	1R	Absent; had turned pro						16–10
Wimbledon Championships	2R	A	1R	3R	3R	F	4R	F	3R	3R	SF	2R	3R	Absent; had turned pro						31–12
U.S. National Championships	A	A	A	A	3R	QF	A	3R	A	4R	1R	A	A	Absent; had turned pro						11–5
Win–loss	3–2	0–0	0–1	2–2	6–3	10–2	4–2	10–3	5–2	7–3	5–3	4–2	2–2	0–0	0–0	0–0	0–0	0–0	0–0	58–27
Professional majors
U.S. Pro Tennis Championships	Absent; had not turned pro												A	A	A	A	A	A	A	0–0
French Pro Championship	Absent; had not turned pro												1R	1R	1R	1R	1R	1R	A	0–6
Wembley Championships	Absent; had not turned pro												1R	1R	1R	1R	PR	A	1R	0–5
Win–loss	0–0	0–0	0–0	0–0	0–0	0–0	0–0	0–0	0–0	0–0	0–0	0–0	0–2	0–2	0–2	0–2	0–1	0–1	0–1	0–11

Note: ^{1} First round bye
