= Goran Mihajlović =

Former professional Serbian Tennis player

- Country (sports): Yugoslavia
- Born: 6 May 1971 (age 53); Belgrade, SR Serbia, SFR Yugoslavia
- Turned pro: 1990
- Retired: 1996
- Plays: Right-handed
- Prize money: $1,217

Singles
- Highest ranking: No. 398 (21 Jun 1993)

Grand Slam singles results
- US Open: Q1 (1993)

Team competitions
- Davis Cup: 1–0

Goran Mihajlović (Serbian Cyrillic: Горан Михајловић; born 6 May 1971) is a Serbian tennis coach and former professional player.

== Career ==
Mihajlović competed professionally on the tennis tour during the 1990s, achieving a career-high singles ranking of No. 398. He primarily participated in satellite tournaments and competed in the qualifying rounds for the 1993 US Open.

In 1995, Mihajlović represented Yugoslavia in the Davis Cup, securing a singles victory against Gabriel Francini of San Marino.

Mihajlović moved to Germany in the 1990s and works there as a tennis coach.

== See also ==
- List of Yugoslavia Davis Cup team representatives
