= David Samaai =

South African tennis player (1927–2019)

- Full name: David A. Samaai
- Country (sports): South Africa
- Born: 19 December 1927; Paarl, Western Cape, South Africa
- Died: 14 June 2019 (aged 91); Cape Town, South Africa
- Plays: Right-handed

Singles

Grand Slam singles results
- French Open: 2R (1951)
- Wimbledon: 3R (1951)

Doubles

Grand Slam doubles results
- Wimbledon: 2R (1960)

Mixed doubles

Grand Slam mixed doubles results
- Wimbledon: 3R (1951)

David Samaai (19 December 1927 – 14 June 2019) was a South African tennis player.

== Early life and career ==
He was born in Paarl, Western Cape, South Africa, one of seven brothers. His father taught him tennis and the family build a tennis court in the garden as at the time non-white schools did not have tennis courts.

Under the Apartheid regime he was not allowed to enter tournaments in South Africa, like the South African Championships, but he could play tournaments abroad although he had to fund his own trips. He participated in the Wimbledon Championships in 1949, 1951, 1954 and 1960, the first non-white South African to do so. His best result in the singles event was reaching the third round in 1951 where he lost in straight sets to seventh-seeded and eventual finalist Ken McGregor. At the 1951 French Championships he lost in the second round of the singles event to Armando Vieira. He also competed in the German Championships and the Swiss International Championships.

In June 1951 he was runner-up in singles at the Surrey Championships in Surbiton, losing the final in three sets to Czesław Spychała. Later that month he won the singles title at Malvern beating Josip Palada in the final. During his career he also won singles titles at English tournaments in Hoylake, Matlock, Moseley, Shirley Park and Sutton Coldfield.

At home he won the Singles Coloured Championships of South Africa 21 times, from the age of 18 until he retired from tennis aged 38. Due to Apartheid he was never eligible to play for the South African Davis Cup team.

== Honors ==
In 1996 he received the Presidential Sports Award for his achievement in tennis. In 2018 he was inducted in the South African Sports Legends Hall of Fame. Tennis South Africa announced after his death that the winner of the Junior Grand A tournament in Cape Town will receive the David Samaai Cup in his honor.

== Personal life ==
He was married to Winifred, who died in 2016, and the couple had two children.
