= Milan Branović =

Croatian tennis player

- Country (sports): Yugoslavia
- Born: 26 September 1922
- Plays: Right-handed

Singles

Grand Slam singles results
- French Open: 3R (1952)
- Wimbledon: 1R (1949, 50, 51, 52, 59)

Milan Branović (born 26 September 1922) is a Croatian former tennis player.

Branović, originally from Čakovec, played for the Yugoslavia Davis Cup team between 1949 and 1951. In 1952 he defected to the west along with his Davis Cup teammate Dragutin Mitić, while they were competing in Italy. He took refuge in the German city of Munich. From 1956 to 1958 he was a three-time German national singles champion.

== See also ==
- List of Yugoslavia Davis Cup team representatives
