= Gene Garrett =

American tennis player

- Full name: Walter Eugene Garrett
- Country (sports): United States
- Born: July 11, 1925
- Died: October 17, 1993 (aged 68)
- Plays: Right-handed

Grand Slam singles results
- French Open: 3R (1951)
- Wimbledon: 3R (1951)
- US Open: 3R (1948, 1953)

Walter Eugene Garrett (July 11, 1925 – October 17, 1993) was an American professional tennis player.

Raised in San Diego, Garrett was a collegiate tennis player for the UCLA Bruins and in 1950 won the NCAA doubles championship partnering Herbert Flam. His collegiate tennis career also include a singles win over Vic Seixas.

Garrett, who made third round of the French Open and Wimbledon in 1951, later competed as a professional. He defeated Bobby Riggs en route to winning the Eastern Professional Championships in 1955 and the following year played a quarter-final at the U.S. Pro Tennis Championships, which he lost to Pancho Segura.

In 1956 he was appointed to coach Syracuse University.
