= Hal Burrows =

American tennis player (1924–2014)

- Full name: Harold Melville Burrows Jr
- Country (sports): United States
- Born: December 24, 1924 Washington, North Carolina
- Died: September 20, 2014 (aged 89) Richmond, Virginia

Singles
- Career record: 132-92
- Career titles: 5

Grand Slam singles results
- French Open: 3R (1951, 1954)
- Wimbledon: 3R (1954)
- US Open: 4R (1955)

Grand Slam doubles results
- French Open: QF (1951)
- Wimbledon: QF (1954)
- US Open: SF (1953)

Harold Melville Burrows Jr (December 24, 1924 — September 20, 2014) was an American tennis player.

Burrows was raised in Charlottesville, Virginia and served in Europe during the war as a radio operator with the 81st Squadron of the 436th Troop Carrier Group. After the war he captained University of Virginia in collegiate tennis and was a three-time state champion, before graduating in 1950.

Active on tour in the 1950s, Burrows won the 1952 Eastern Canadian Championships in Quebec City on clay where he defeated Canadian No. 1 Lorne Main in the final in a close four set match. He also won the 1954 Paris International Championships on clay in Paris defeating French No. 1 Paul Rémy in a close final.

His doubles partnership with Straight Clark ranked amongst the top in the world, with their best win coming in the quarter-finals of the 1953 U.S. National Championships over Lew Hoad and Ken Rosewall, who were trying to complete the calendar grand slam. In 1954 he became the first native of Virginia to play Davis Cup tennis and was part of a winning campaign. He featured in the preliminary America Zone fixtures against the Caribbean and Cuba.

Burrows served as a representative for Charlottesville on the Virginia House of Delegates from 1960 to 1962. He was a member of the Democratic Party. In 1990 he was an inductee in the Virginia Sports Hall of Fame and Museum.

== See also ==
- List of United States Davis Cup team representatives
