= Armando Vieira =

Brazilian tennis player (1923–2010)

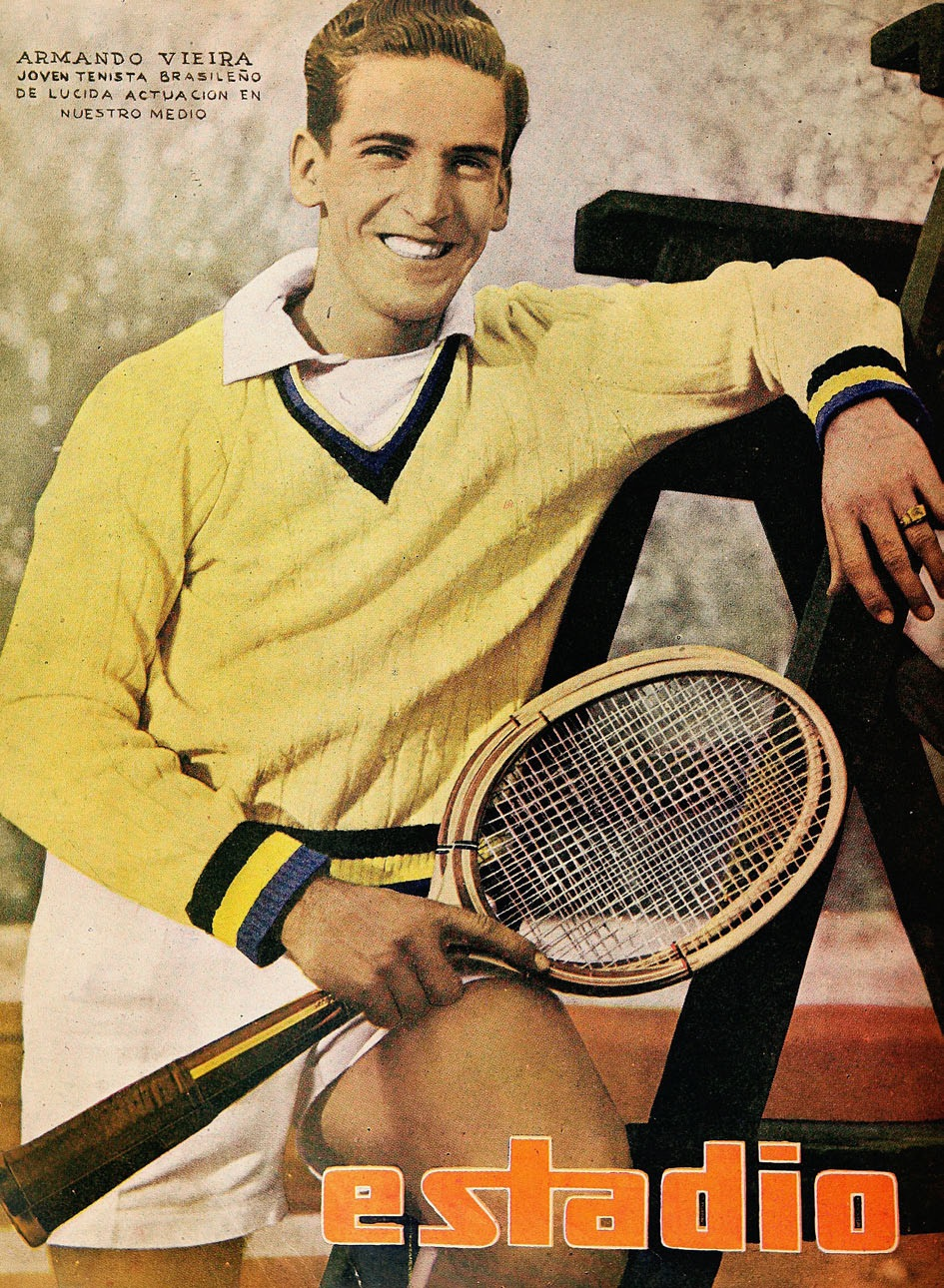
- Vieira in 1945
- Country (sports): Brazil
- Born: 11 April 1923 São Paulo, Brazil
- Died: 14 January 2010 (aged 86)

Singles

Grand Slam singles results
- French Open: 3R (1951, 1953, 1954)
- Wimbledon: QF (1951)
- US Open: 3R (1957)

Armando Vieira (11 April 1923 – 14 January 2010) was a Brazilian tennis player. His best achievement was reaching quarterfinals of the 1951 Wimbledon Championships.

In June 1951 he won the singles title at the Dutch International Championships after defeating Felicisimo Ampon in the final in three straight sets. He won the Dixie International Championships on clay in 1956. Vieira turned professional in 1958. Vieira died on 14 January 2010, at the age of 86.
