= Johann Kupferburger =

South African tennis player

- Country (sports): South Africa
- Born: 10 February 1933; Pretoria, South Africa
- Died: December 1988; Johannesburg, South Africa
- Turned pro: 1951 (amateur tour)
- Retired: 1958

Singles
- Career record: 91–61 (4–6 per ATP)
- Career titles: 3

Grand Slam singles results
- French Open: 2R (1953)
- Wimbledon: 1R (1951, 1953)
- US Open: 3R (1955)

Doubles

Grand Slam doubles results
- Wimbledon: 2R (1953)

Mixed doubles

Grand Slam mixed doubles results
- Wimbledon: 4R (1953)

Johann Friedrich Kupferburger (10 February 1933 – December 1988) was a South African tennis player who was active in the 1950s.

== Tennis career ==
Kupferburger won the 1951 Wimbledon Boys' Singles title by beating the Egyptian player, Kamel Moubarek in the final. He attended college in the United States at the University of Miami, where he was a member of the university's tennis team and he earned All-American honours in 1957.

Kupferburger also competed on the amateur circuit and won 3 titles. His first title was in August 1955 when he won the Ontario Championships, beating Gardnar Mulloy in the final. The next week he was successful again when he won the Cleveland House Invitation by defeating Gilbert Bogley in the final. His last title was almost three years later, at the 1958 Oakville Invitation, beating the Canadian Donald Fontana.

His best result at a Grand Slam events was reaching the third round at the 1955 US Open, before losing to Art Larsen. After retiring as player he worked as a tennis coach in South Africa.

== Junior Grand Slam titles ==
=== Singles: 1 ===
Result	Year	Tournament	Surface	Opponent	Score
Win	1951	Wimbledon	Grass	(Egypt) Kamel Moubarek	6–2, 6–1
