= Jean-Claude Molinari =

French tennis player

- Country (sports): France
- Born: 28 August 1931
- Died: 22 April 1999 (aged 67)

Grand Slam singles results
- French Open: 3R (1951, 1953, 1958, 1959)
- Wimbledon: QF (1959)
- US Open: 1R (1951)

Jean-Claude Molinari (28 August 1931 – 22 April 1999) was a French tennis player, originally amateur and later professional.

At Wimbledon, he reached the quarter-finals of the men's singles in 1959.

In the Davis Cup in 1954, he defeated Ramanathan Krishnan of India in the quarter-finals of the men's singles, 4–6, 4–6, 2–6. In 1957, he and Paul Rémy reached the quarter-finals of the men's doubles, where they were defeated by Mike Davies and Bobby Wilson of Great Britain, 3–6, 6–3, 6–1, 6–3. In 1958, with Pierre Darmon, he reached the semi-finals of the men's doubles, where they were again defeated by Davies and Wilson, 6–4, 3–6, 4–6, 1–6. In 1959, he and Jean-Noël Grinda won the quarter-final of the men's doubles against Gheorghe and Marian Viziru of Romania, 6–1, 6–1 6–4; in 1960, again with Grinda, he reached the semi-finals, where they were defeated by Jan-Erik Lundqvist and Ulf Schmidt of Sweden, 6–2, 4–6, 4–6, 2–6.

At the 1961 French Open, he was forced to withdraw with a torn Achilles tendon when leading Fred Stolle in the first round of the men's singles 6–4, 7–5, 5–2.
