= Leon Norgarb =

South African golfer and tennis player (1926–2022)

- Country (sports): South Africa
- Born: 9 April 1926 Pretoria, South Africa
- Died: 2022 (aged 96) Cape Town, South Africa

Singles

Grand Slam singles results
- French Open: 2R (1951, 1952)
- Wimbledon: 3R (1951)

Doubles

Grand Slam doubles results
- Wimbledon: 2R (1952)

Grand Slam mixed doubles results
- Wimbledon: 3R (1952)

Leon Norgarb (9 April 1926 – 2022) was a South African golfer and tennis player. He has the distinction of appearing in both a golf major and grand slam tennis tournament.

Born in Pretoria, Norgarb was active on the tennis tour in the 1950s and became known for his powerful serve. He competed in the main draw of both the French and Wimbledon Championships. His career included a sole Davis Cup match in 1951, when he partnered Eric Sturgess in a doubles rubber against Italy in Milan. He won the singles title at the 1951 Swiss International Championships.

Norgarb lived for a time with golfer Bobby Locke in London and on Locke's urging entered the qualifying tournament for The Open Championship, successfully making it into the main draw. He also once led the South African Open after the first day, as part of a field which included Gary Player.
