= Sven Davidson =

Swedish tennis player

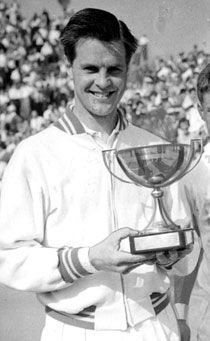
- Sven Davidson after winning the 1957 French Tennis Championships.
- Country (sports): Sweden
- Born: 13 July 1928 Borås, Sweden
- Died: 28 May 2008 (aged 79) Arcadia, California, United States
- Plays: Right-handed (one-handed backhand)
- Int. Tennis HoF: 2007 (member page)

Singles
- Career record: 542–171 (76.2%)
- Career titles: 50
- Highest ranking: No. 2 (1957)

Grand Slam singles results
- Australian Open: 3R (1955)
- French Open: W (1957)
- Wimbledon: SF (1957)
- US Open: SF (1957)

Doubles

Grand Slam doubles results
- French Open: SF (1956)
- Wimbledon: W (1958)

Grand Slam mixed doubles results
- Wimbledon: QF (1951)

Sven Viktor Davidson (13 July 1928 – 28 May 2008) was a Swedish tennis player who became the first Swede to win a Grand Slam title when he won the French Championships in 1957, beating Ashley Cooper and Herbert Flam.

== Career ==
Davidson also reached the French championships final in the two previous years. In 1955, he lost to Tony Trabert. In 1956, he lost to Lew Hoad. He also reached the Wimbledon semifinals in 1957, losing to Lew Hoad. At the 1957 U.S. Championships, Davidson lost in five sets in the semifinals to Mal Anderson. In 1958, Davidson partnered with Ulf Schmidt to win the doubles title at the Wimbledon Championships, defeating the Australian pair Ashley Cooper and Neale Fraser. He played his last Grand Slam event at Wimbledon in 1959.

Davidson reached a career-high singles ranking of World No. 2.

He played for the Swedish Davis Cup team from 1950 to 1960.

Davidson was inducted into the International Tennis Hall of Fame in 2007.

== Personal life ==
Davidson lived in Arcadia, California since the 1970s. In 1981, at age 52, he suffered a heart attack while playing a tennis match in Los Angeles. He died in Arcadia on 28 May 2008 as a result of pneumonia.

== Grand Slam finals ==
=== Singles (1 title, 2 runners-up) ===
Result	Year	Championship	Surface	Opponent	Score
Loss	1955	French Championships	Clay	(United States) Tony Trabert	6–2, 1–6, 4–6, 2–6
Loss	1956	French Championships	Clay	(Australia) Lew Hoad	4–6, 6–8, 3–6
Win	1957	French Championships	Clay	(United States) Herbie Flam	6–3, 6–4, 6–4

=== Doubles (1 title) ===
Result	Year	Championship	Surface	Partner	Opponents	Score
Win	1958	Wimbledon	Grass	(Sweden) Ulf Schmidt	(Australia) Ashley Cooper (Australia) Neale Fraser	6–4, 6–4, 8–6

== Grand Slam tournament performance timeline ==
Key
W	F	SF	QF	#R	RR	Q#	DNQ	A	NH

(W) winner; (F) finalist; (SF) semifinalist; (QF) quarterfinalist; (#R) rounds 4, 3, 2, 1; (RR) round-robin stage; (Q#) qualification round; (DNQ) did not qualify; (A) absent; (NH) not held; (SR) strike rate (events won / competed); (W–L) win–loss record.

=== Singles ===
Tournament	1949	1950	1951	1952	1953	1954	1955	1956	1957	1958	1959	SR
Australian Championships	A	A	A	A	A	A	3R	A	A	A	A	0 / 1
French Championships	1R	4R	4R	A	4R	QF	F	F	W	A	A	1 / 8
Wimbledon	A	1R	2R	A	QF	4R	QF	2R	SF	QF	3R	0 / 9
U.S. National Championships	A	2R	A	A	QF	4R	A	A	SF	A	A	0 / 4
Strike rate	0 / 1	0 / 3	0 / 2	0 / 0	0 / 3	0 / 3	0 / 3	0 / 2	1 / 3	0 / 1	0 / 1	1 / 22
