= 1951 Wimbledon Championships =

- Date: 25 June – 7 July
- Edition: 65th
- Category: Grand Slam
- Surface: Grass
- Location: Church Road; SW19, Wimbledon, London, United Kingdom
- Venue: All England Lawn Tennis and Croquet Club
- Attendance: 267,440

Champions

Men's singles
- (United States) Dick Savitt

Women's singles
- (United States) Doris Hart

Men's doubles
- (Australia) Ken McGregor / (Australia) Frank Sedgman

Women's doubles
- (United States) Shirley Fry / (United States) Doris Hart

Mixed doubles
- (Australia) Frank Sedgman / (United States) Doris Hart

Boys' singles
- (South Africa) Johann Kupferburger

Girls' singles
- (United Kingdom) Lorna Cornell
- Wimbledon Championships

The 1951 Wimbledon Championships took place on the outdoor grass courts at the All England Lawn Tennis and Croquet Club in Wimbledon, London, United Kingdom. The tournament was held from Monday 25 June until Saturday 7 July 1951. It was the 65th staging of the Wimbledon Championships, and the third Grand Slam tennis event of 1951. Dick Savitt and Doris Hart won the singles titles; Hart also won both the women's doubles and mixed doubles, completing the triple crown.

This was the final Wimbledon tournament during the reign of King George VI.

== Finals ==
=== Seniors ===
==== Men's singles ====
(United States) Dick Savitt defeated (Australia) Ken McGregor, 6–4, 6–4, 6–4

==== Women's singles ====
(United States) Doris Hart defeated (United States) Shirley Fry, 6–1, 6–0

==== Men's doubles ====
(Australia) Ken McGregor / (Australia) Frank Sedgman defeated (Egypt) Jaroslav Drobný / (South Africa) Eric Sturgess, 3–6, 6–2, 6–3, 3–6, 6–3

==== Women's doubles ====
(United States) Shirley Fry / (United States) Doris Hart defeated (United States) Louise Brough / (United States) Margaret duPont, 6–3, 13–11

==== Mixed doubles ====
(Australia) Frank Sedgman / (United States) Doris Hart defeated (Australia) Mervyn Rose / (Australia) Nancye Bolton, 7–5, 6–2

=== Juniors ===
==== Boys' singles ====
(South Africa) Johann Kupferburger defeated (Egypt) Kamel Moubarek, 8–6, 6–4

==== Girls' singles ====
(United Kingdom) Lorna Cornell defeated (Italy) Silvana Lazzarino, 6–3, 6–4

Preceded by 1951 French Championships	Grand Slams	Succeeded by 1951 U.S. National Championships
