= Władysław Skonecki =

Polish tennis player

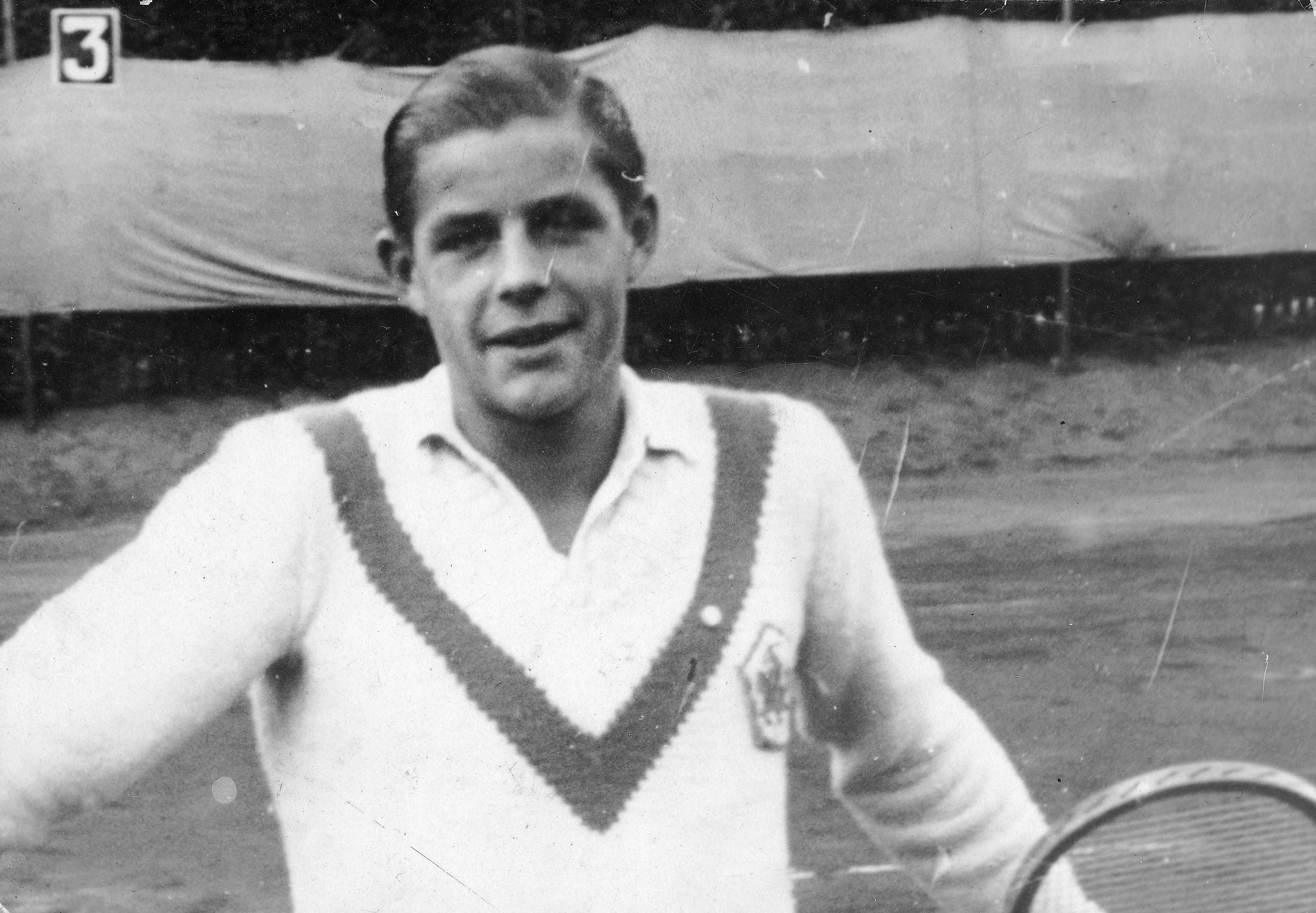
- Skonecki in 1938
- Country (sports): Poland
- Born: 13 July 1920 Tomsk, Soviet Union
- Died: 12 June 1983 (age 62) Vienna, Austria
- Turned pro: 1945 (amateur)
- Retired: 1966

Singles
- Career record: 424–186
- Career titles: 61

Grand Slam singles results
- French Open: 4R (1953, 1955)
- Wimbledon: 3R (1947, 1951)
- US Open: 3R (1962)

Mixed doubles

Team competitions

Wladyslaw Skonecki (13 July 1920 – 12 June 1983) was a Polish tennis player. He was a Polish Champion, two-time winner of Monte Carlo Championships and represented the country in Davis Cup.

== Career ==
Skonecki was born in Tomsk, in the Soviet Union on 13 July 1920. He played his first tournament in 1945 at the Polish National Championships.

His career highlights include winning of Budapest International Championships in 1949, the Bad Neuenahr International (1951), the Italian Riviera Championships at San Remo in 1953, 1954, the Ortisei Tournament 1953,

In 1955 he won 12 singles titles that season. some of which included the Austrian International Championships, the Beaulieu International Championships, the British Covered Court Championships, the Cannes Gallia Club Championship, the Monte Carlo Championships, the Riviera Championships, the South of France Championships, and the Sao Paulo International.

He also won the Central India Championships in 1955 and 1956, and the Ceylon Championships in 1955. Also in 1955 he won In 1958 he won the West Berlin Championships. He won his final tournament at the Polish Indoors in 1965. Skonecki played his final tournament at the Aix-en-Provence Golden Racket Trophy in Aix-en-Provence, France in 1967. He died in Vienna, Austria on 12 June 1983.

== See also ==
- Sport in Poland
- List of Polish tennis players
