= Paul Rémy =

French tennis player

- Full name: Paul Louis Rémy
- Country (sports): France
- Born: 17 February 1923; Sainte-Amélie, Algiers, French Algeria
- Died: 14 March 2001 (aged 78); Avignon, France

Singles
- Career record: 296-176
- Career titles: 27

Grand Slam singles results
- French Open: QF (1956)
- Wimbledon: 4R (1951)

Doubles

Grand Slam doubles results
- Wimbledon: QF (1958)

Paul Rémy (17 February 1923 – 14 March 2001) was a French No. 1 tennis player. He was active in the 1950s, playing in Wimbledon, the US Open, the French Open and the Davis Cup.

In 1951, he won the Quebec Open, defeating Canadian clay court specialists Henri Rochon, Brendan Macken and Lorne Main in long matches.

In 1956, he won the South of France Championships, defeating Torben Ulrich, Gardnar Mulloy, and Pierre Darmon in the last three rounds.

Rémy reached the quarter finals of the 1956 French Championships, beating fourth seed Art Larsen in the fourth round. He won the five set three-hour match "with a steady stream of angled placements, passing shots and expert volleys. Larsen missed many easy shots." He lost to Giuseppe Merlo in the quarter finals 10-8 in the fifth set.
