= 1956 Davis Cup Europe Zone =

International tennis competition

Details
- Duration: 27 April 1956 – 22 July 1956
- Teams: 24
- Categories: 1956 Davis Cup America Zone; 1956 Davis Cup Eastern Zone; 1956 Davis Cup Europe Zone

Champion
- Winning nation: Italy; Qualified for: 1956 Davis Cup; Inter-Zonal Finals

The Europe Zone was one of the three regional zones of the 1956 Davis Cup.

24 teams entered the Europe Zone, with the winner going on to compete in the Inter-Zonal Zone against the winners of the America Zone and Eastern Zone. Italy defeated Sweden in the final and progressed to the Inter-Zonal Zone.

== Draw ==
First round 27 April–1 May
Italy
bye
Poland	3
Austria	2
Denmark
bye
Czechoslovakia	5
Pakistan	0
France
bye
Luxembourg	2
Switzerland	3
West Germany
bye
Ireland	4
Finland	1
Turkey	0
Netherlands	5
bye
Chile
Yugoslavia	4
Egypt	1
bye
Great Britain
Monaco	2
Spain	3
bye
Belgium
Norway	4
Israel	1
bye
Sweden

Second round 10–15 May
Warsaw, Poland
Italy	5
Poland	0
Prague, Czechoslovakia (clay)
Denmark	4
Czechoslovakia	1
Lausanne, Switzerland
France	5
Switzerland	0
Dublin, Ireland
West Germany	4
Ireland	1
Scheveningen, Netherlands (clay)
Netherlands	0
Chile	5
Belgrade, Yugoslavia (clay)
Yugoslavia	0
Great Britain	5
Barcelona, Spain (clay)
Spain	1
Belgium	4
Oslo, Norway (clay)
Norway	0
Sweden	5

Quarterfinals; 31 May-4 June
Bologna, Italy (clay)
Italy	4
Denmark	1
Duisburg, West Germany (clay)
France	4
West Germany	1
Bristol, England (grass)
Chile	2
Great Britain	3
Brussels, Belgium (clay)
Belgium	1
Sweden	4

Semifinals; 15–17 July
Paris, France (clay)
Italy	3
France	2
Solna, Sweden (clay)
Great Britain	1
Sweden	4

Final; 20–22 July
Båstad, Sweden (clay)
Italy	5
Sweden	0

== First round ==
=== Poland vs. Austria ===
Poland
3
Warsaw, Poland
27–29 April 1956

Austria
2

			1	2	3	4	5
1	(Poland) (Austria)	Władysław Skonecki; Alfred Huber	6; 2	6; 3	6; 4
2	(Poland) (Austria)	Andrzej Licis; Franz Saiko	6; 2	4; 6	4; 6	4; 6
3	(Poland) (Austria)	Józef Piątek / Władysław Skonecki; Alfred Huber / Franz Saiko	3; 6	3; 6	1; 6
4	(Poland) (Austria)	Władysław Skonecki; Franz Saiko	6; 3	5; 7	6; 2	6; 3
5	(Poland) (Austria)	Andrzej Licis; Alfred Huber	2; 6	6; 0	6; 4	6; 3

=== Czechoslovakia vs. Pakistan ===
Czechoslovakia
5
Prague, Czechoslovakia
27–30 April 1956

Pakistan
0

			1	2	3	4	5
1	(Czechoslovakia) (Pakistan)	Jiří Parma; Khan-Iftikhar Ahmed	4; 6	11; 9	6; 3	2; 6	6; 4
2	(Czechoslovakia) (Pakistan)	Jiří Javorský; Khwaja Saeed Hai	6; 1	6; 2	6; 3
3	(Czechoslovakia) (Pakistan)	Jiří Javorský / Vladimír Zábrodský; Khan-Iftikhar Ahmed / Khwaja Saeed Hai	6; 3	10; 8	5; 7	6; 2
4	(Czechoslovakia) (Pakistan)	Jiří Parma; Khwaja Saeed Hai	6; 2	6; 2	8; 6
5	(Czechoslovakia) (Pakistan)	Jiří Javorský; Khan-Iftikhar Ahmed	6; 3	4; 6	6; 3	6; 2

=== Luxembourg vs. Switzerland ===
Luxembourg
2
Esch-sur-Alzette, Luxembourg
27 April–1 May 1956

Switzerland
3

			1	2	3	4	5
1	(Luxembourg) (Switzerland)	Géza Wertheim; Paul Blondel	4; 6	3; 6	4; 6
2	(Luxembourg) (Switzerland)	Gaston Wampach; Bernard du Pont	6; 4	6; 4	5; 7	1; 6	6; 0
3	(Luxembourg) (Switzerland)	Gaston Wampach / Géza Wertheim; Paul Blondel / René Buser	2; 6	1; 6	1; 6
4	(Luxembourg) (Switzerland)	Géza Wertheim; Bernard du Pont	1; 6	1; 6	1; 6
5	(Luxembourg) (Switzerland)	Gaston Wampach; Erwin Balestra	6; 4	6; 1	4; 6	6; 2

=== Ireland vs. Finland ===
Ireland
4
Dublin, Ireland
27–30 April 1956

Finland
1

			1	2	3	4	5
1	(Republic of Ireland) (Finland)	Joseph Hackett; Reino Nyyssönen	6; 3	6; 3	6; 1
2	(Republic of Ireland) (Finland)	Guy Jackson; Sakari Salo	3; 6	6; 3	6; 2	2; 6	3; 6
3	(Republic of Ireland) (Finland)	Joseph Hackett / Guy Jackson; Reino Nyyssönen / Sakari Salo	6; 3	12; 10	3; 6	6; 3
4	(Republic of Ireland) (Finland)	Guy Jackson; Reino Nyyssönen	6; 2	6; 3	6; 2
5	(Republic of Ireland) (Finland)	Joseph Hackett; Sakari Salo	6; 2	6; 3	6; 1

=== Turkey vs. Netherlands ===
Turkey
0
Ankara, Turkey
27–29 April 1956

Netherlands
5

			1	2	3	4	5
1	(Turkey) (Netherlands)	Nazmi Bari; Fred Dehnert	9; 11	6; 2	5; 7	4; 6
2	(Turkey) (Netherlands)	Şefik Fenmen; Hans van Dalsum	3; 6	2; 6	3; 6
3	(Turkey) (Netherlands)	Nazmi Bari / Şefik Fenmen; Hans van Dalsum / Fred Dehnert	5; 7	2; 6	3; 6
4	(Turkey) (Netherlands)	Şefik Fenmen; Fred Dehnert	7; 9	1; 6	6; 8
5	(Turkey) (Netherlands)	Nazmi Bari; Hans van Dalsum	6; 0	3; 6	4; 6	6; 8

=== Yugoslavia vs. Egypt ===
Yugoslavia
4
Belgrade, Yugoslavia
27–30 April 1956

Egypt
1

			1	2	3	4	5
1	(Socialist Federal Republic of Yugoslavia) (Egypt)	Ivko Plećević; Ibrahim Badreldin-Sayed	2; 6	6; 1	6; 1	2; 6	6; 3
2	(Socialist Federal Republic of Yugoslavia) (Egypt)	Josip Palada; Adel Ismail	6; 2	6; 4	6; 4
3	(Socialist Federal Republic of Yugoslavia) (Egypt)	Ilija Panajotović / Ivko Plećević; Donald Acobas / Adel Ismail	6; 2	6; 3	4; 6	6; 3
4	(Socialist Federal Republic of Yugoslavia) (Egypt)	Ilija Panajotović; Ibrahim Badreldin-Sayed	6; 2	6; 1	6; 2
5	(Socialist Federal Republic of Yugoslavia) (Egypt)	Ivko Plećević; Adel Ismail	6; 1	6; 1	4; 6	6; 8	2; 6

=== Monaco vs. Spain ===
Monaco
2
Monte Carlo Country Club, Monte Carlo, Monaco
27–30 April 1956
Clay

Spain
3

			1	2	3	4	5
1	(Monaco) (Spain)	Roland Borghini; Emilio Martínez del Rey	4; 6	5; 7	7; 5	5; 7
2	(Monaco) (Spain)	Georges Pasquier; José María Draper	3; 6	6; 4	1; 6	6; 2	6; 4
3	(Monaco) (Spain)	Roland Borghini / Georges Pasquier; Emilio Martínez del Rey / Fernando Olózaga	6; 8	3; 6	0; 6
4	(Monaco) (Spain)	Georges Pasquier; Emilio Martínez del Rey	6; 3	10; 8	0; 6	6; 1
5	(Monaco) (Spain)	Roland Borghini; José María Draper	7; 5	3; 6	5; 7	1; 6

=== Norway vs. Israel ===
Norway
4
Oslo, Norway
27 April–1 May 1956
Clay

Israel
1

			1	2	3	4	5
1	(Norway) (Israel)	Finn Søhol; Arie Avidan-Weiss	6; 1	6; 3	6; 3
2	(Norway) (Israel)	Gunnar Høst Sjøwall; Eleazar Davidman	6; 1	6; 2	6; 3
3	(Norway) (Israel)	Gunnar Høst Sjøwall / Finn Søhol; Arie Avidan-Weiss / Eleazar Davidman	4; 6	6; 2	3; 6	6; 8
4	(Norway) (Israel)	Finn Søhol; Eleazar Davidman	7; 5	6; 8	2; 6	6; 3	6; 4
5	(Norway) (Israel)	Gunnar Høst Sjøwall; Arie Avidan-Weiss	6; 2	6; 0	6; 1

== Second round ==
=== Poland vs. Italy ===
Poland
0
Warsaw, Poland
12–14 May 1956

Italy
5

			1	2	3	4	5
1	(Poland) (Italy)	Władysław Skonecki; Giuseppe Merlo	0; 6	2; 6	3; 6
2	(Poland) (Italy)	Andrzej Licis; Nicola Pietrangeli	4; 6	4; 6	5; 7
3	(Poland) (Italy)	Józef Piątek / Jan Radzio; Nicola Pietrangeli / Orlando Sirola	3; 6	2; 6	4; 6
4	(Poland) (Italy)	Andrzej Licis; Giuseppe Merlo	3; 6	3; 6	5; 7
5	(Poland) (Italy)	Władysław Skonecki; Nicola Pietrangeli	2; 6	2; 6	1; 6

=== Czechoslovakia vs. Denmark ===
Czechoslovakia
1
Prague, Czechoslovakia
11–13 May 1956
Clay

Denmark
4

			1	2	3	4	5
1	(Czechoslovakia) (Denmark)	Jiří Parma; Kurt Nielsen	6; 8	2; 6	6; 8
2	(Czechoslovakia) (Denmark)	Jiří Javorský; Torben Ulrich	4; 6	3; 6	5; 7
3	(Czechoslovakia) (Denmark)	Jiří Javorský / Vladimír Zábrodský; Kurt Nielsen / Torben Ulrich	6; 8	4; 6	7; 5	5; 7
4	(Czechoslovakia) (Denmark)	Jiří Parma; Torben Ulrich	6; 3	3; 6	6; 8	4; 6
5	(Czechoslovakia) (Denmark)	Jiří Javorský; Kurt Nielsen	7; 5	2; 6	5; 7	6; 4	7; 5

=== Switzerland vs. France ===
Switzerland
0
Lausanne, Switzerland
10–12 May 1956

France
5

			1	2	3	4	5
1	(Switzerland) (France)	Paul Blondel; Robert Haillet	2; 6	4; 6	1; 6
2	(Switzerland) (France)	Martin Froesch; Pierre Darmon	9; 11	6; 1	2; 6	8; 6	2; 6
3	(Switzerland) (France)	Paul Blondel / René Buser; Marcel Bernard / Paul Rémy	1; 6	3; 6	3; 6
4	(Switzerland) (France)	Martin Froesch; Robert Haillet	6; 8	3; 6	4; 6
5	(Switzerland) (France)	Paul Blondel; Pierre Darmon	1; 6	1; 6	2; 6

=== Ireland vs. West Germany ===
Ireland
1
Dublin, Ireland
10–12 May 1956

West Germany
4

			1	2	3	4	5
1	(Republic of Ireland) (West Germany)	Guy Jackson; Rupert Huber	6; 8	4; 6	7; 9
2	(Republic of Ireland) (West Germany)	Joseph Hackett; Franz Feldbausch	0; 6	7; 5	3; 6	6; 3	1; 6
3	(Republic of Ireland) (West Germany)	Joseph Hackett / Guy Jackson; Franz Feldbausch / Peter Scholl	6; 2	6; 4	6; 4
4	(Republic of Ireland) (West Germany)	Guy Jackson; Franz Feldbausch	0; 6	4; 6	6; 3	6; 4	1; 6
5	(Republic of Ireland) (West Germany)	Joseph Hackett; Rupert Huber	4; 6	6; 3	3; 6	4; 6

=== Netherlands vs. Chile ===
Netherlands
0
Scheveningen, Netherlands
11–13 May 1956
Clay

Chile
5

			1	2	3	4	5
1	(Netherlands) (Chile)	Hans van Dalsum; Andrés Hammersley	6; 8	4; 6	2; 6
2	(Netherlands) (Chile)	Fred Dehnert; Luis Ayala	3; 6	1; 6	0; 6
3	(Netherlands) (Chile)	Hans van Dalsum / Fred Dehnert; Luis Ayala / Andrés Hammersley	1; 6	8; 6	3; 6	2; 6
4	(Netherlands) (Chile)	Hans van Dalsum; Luis Ayala	5; 7	4; 6	4; 6
5	(Netherlands) (Chile)	Fred Dehnert; Andrés Hammersley	1; 6	2; 6	2; 6

=== Yugoslavia vs. Great Britain ===
Yugoslavia
0
Belgrade, Yugoslavia
13–15 May 1956
Clay

Great Britain
5

			1	2	3	4	5
1	(Socialist Federal Republic of Yugoslavia) (United Kingdom)	Josip Palada; Roger Becker	4; 6	0; 6	2; 6
2	(Socialist Federal Republic of Yugoslavia) (United Kingdom)	Ilija Panajotović; Billy Knight	4; 6	4; 6	2; 6
3	(Socialist Federal Republic of Yugoslavia) (United Kingdom)	Ilija Panajotović / Ivko Plećević; Mike Davies / Billy Knight	2; 6	6; 8	2; 6
4	(Socialist Federal Republic of Yugoslavia) (United Kingdom)	Ilija Panajotović; Roger Becker	1; 6	3; 6	0; 6
5	(Socialist Federal Republic of Yugoslavia) (United Kingdom)	Ivko Plećević; Mike Davies	1; 6	3; 6	1; 6

=== Spain vs. Belgium ===
Spain
1
Real Club de Tenis Barcelona, Barcelona, Spain
10–13 May 1956
Clay

Belgium
4

			1	2	3	4	5
1	(Spain) (Belgium)	Juan Manuel Couder; Jacques Brichant	3; 6	5; 7	1; 6
2	(Spain) (Belgium)	Emilio Martínez del Rey; Gino Mezzi	4; 6	2; 6	4; 6
3	(Spain) (Belgium)	Juan Manuel Couder / Fernando Olózaga; Jacques Brichant / Gino Mezzi	2; 6	1; 6	4; 6
4	(Spain) (Belgium)	Emilio Martínez del Rey; Jacques Brichant	2; 6	2; 6	6; 8
5	(Spain) (Belgium)	Juan Manuel Couder; Gino Mezzi	8; 6	2; 6	6; 3	6; 4

=== Norway vs. Sweden ===
Norway
0
Oslo Tennis Club, Oslo, Norway
11–13 May 1956
Clay

Sweden
5

			1	2	3	4	5
1	(Norway) (Sweden)	Gunnar Høst Sjøwall; Sven Davidson	7; 9	6; 4	2; 6	3; 6
2	(Norway) (Sweden)	Nils-Erik Hessen; Ulf Schmidt	1; 6	1; 6	3; 6
3	(Norway) (Sweden)	Nils-Erik Hessen / Gunnar Høst Sjøwall; Sven Davidson / Torsten Johansson	2; 6	3; 6	5; 7
4	(Norway) (Sweden)	Gunnar Høst Sjøwall; Ulf Schmidt	6; 2	3; 6	0; 6	2; 6
5	(Norway) (Sweden)	Nils-Erik Hessen; Bengt Axelsson	3; 6	3; 6	2; 6

== Quarterfinals ==
=== Italy vs. Denmark ===
Italy
4
Bologna, Italy
2-4 June 1956
Clay

Denmark
1

			1	2	3	4	5
1	(Italy) (Denmark)	Giuseppe Merlo; Kurt Nielsen	7; 9	6; 1	3; 6	4; 6
2	(Italy) (Denmark)	Nicola Pietrangeli; Torben Ulrich	4; 6	6; 2	6; 1	6; 0
3	(Italy) (Denmark)	Nicola Pietrangeli / Orlando Sirola; Kurt Nielsen / Torben Ulrich	6; 4	6; 2	3; 6	6; 3
4	(Italy) (Denmark)	Giuseppe Merlo; Torben Ulrich	6; 0	6; 4	6; 2
5	(Italy) (Denmark)	Nicola Pietrangeli; Kurt Nielsen	8; 6	6; 4	4; 6	2; 6	6; 4

=== West Germany vs. France ===
West Germany
1
Duisburg, West Germany
1-3 June 1956
Clay

France
4

			1	2	3	4	5
1	(West Germany) (France)	Peter Scholl; Robert Haillet	6; 8	1; 6	5; 7
2	(West Germany) (France)	Rupert Huber; Paul Rémy	4; 6	2; 6	6; 3	3; 6
3	(West Germany) (France)	Franz Feldbausch / Peter Scholl; Marcel Bernard / Paul Rémy	3; 6	2; 6	2; 6
4	(West Germany) (France)	Peter Scholl; Pierre Darmon	6; 2	6; 0	6; 4
5	(West Germany) (France)	Franz Feldbausch; Robert Haillet	2; 6	3; 6	2; 6

=== Great Britain vs. Chile ===
Great Britain
3
Bristol Lawn Tennis Club, Bristol, England
31 May-2 June 1956
Grass

Chile
2

			1	2	3	4	5
1	(United Kingdom) (Chile)	Roger Becker; Luis Ayala	6; 3	4; 6	3; 6	6; 3	3; 6
2	(United Kingdom) (Chile)	Billy Knight; Andrés Hammersley	6; 3	6; 3	6; 4
3	(United Kingdom) (Chile)	John Barrett / Roger Becker; Luis Ayala / Andrés Hammersley	6; 1	6; 4	9; 7
4	(United Kingdom) (Chile)	Roger Becker; Andrés Hammersley	6; 4	6; 1	6; 1
5	(United Kingdom) (Chile)	Billy Knight; Luis Ayala	6; 1	3; 6	3; 6	0; 6

=== Belgium vs. Sweden ===
Belgium
1
Royal Léopold Club, Brussels, Belgium
1-3 June 1956
Clay

Sweden
4

			1	2	3	4	5
1	(Belgium) (Sweden)	Jacques Brichant; Sven Davidson	3; 6	6; 2	9; 7	1; 6	3; 6
2	(Belgium) (Sweden)	Gino Mezzi; Torsten Johansson	6; 2	4; 6	0; 6	4; 6
3	(Belgium) (Sweden)	Jacques Brichant / Gino Mezzi; Sven Davidson / Torsten Johansson	3; 6	7; 5	4; 6	6; 2	4; 6
4	(Belgium) (Sweden)	Gino Mezzi; Sven Davidson	3; 6	1; 6	1; 6
5	(Belgium) (Sweden)	Jacques Brichant; Ulf Schmidt	6; 0	6; 2	6; 3

== Semifinals ==
=== France vs. Italy ===
France
2
Stade Roland Garros, Paris, France
15–17 July 1956
Clay

Italy
3

			1	2	3	4	5
1	(France) (Italy)	Pierre Darmon; Nicola Pietrangeli	3; 6	6; 3	6; 3	2; 6	6; 3
2	(France) (Italy)	Paul Rémy; Giuseppe Merlo	7; 5	6; 8	6; 2	6; 2
3	(France) (Italy)	Marcel Bernard / Paul Rémy; Nicola Pietrangeli / Orlando Sirola	2; 6	2; 6	6; 2	1; 6
4	(France) (Italy)	Pierre Darmon; Giuseppe Merlo	3; 6	6; 4	7; 9	4; 6
5	(France) (Italy)	Paul Rémy; Nicola Pietrangeli	3; 6	6; 8	2; 6

=== Sweden vs. Great Britain ===
Sweden
4
Solna Tennisstadion, Solna, Sweden
15–17 July 1956
Clay

Great Britain
1

			1	2	3	4	5
1	(Sweden) (United Kingdom)	Sven Davidson; Billy Knight	6; 1	6; 3	10; 8
2	(Sweden) (United Kingdom)	Ulf Schmidt; Roger Becker	3; 6	1; 6	6; 2	6; 1	6; 2
3	(Sweden) (United Kingdom)	Sven Davidson / Torsten Johansson; Roger Becker / Mike Davies	6; 3	8; 6	7; 5
4	(Sweden) (United Kingdom)	Sven Davidson; Mike Davies	4; 6	1; 6	1; 6
5	(Sweden) (United Kingdom)	Ulf Schmidt; Billy Knight	6; 0	6; 8	4; 6	6; 3	6; 4

== Final ==
=== Sweden vs. Italy ===
Sweden
0
Båstad Tennis Stadium, Båstad, Sweden
20–22 July 1956
Clay

Italy
5

			1	2	3	4	5
1	(Sweden) (Italy)	Sven Davidson; Nicola Pietrangeli	4; 6	6; 3	1; 6	4; 6
2	(Sweden) (Italy)	Ulf Schmidt; Giuseppe Merlo	7; 5	2; 6	5; 7	1; 6
3	(Sweden) (Italy)	Sven Davidson / Torsten Johansson; Nicola Pietrangeli / Orlando Sirola	4; 6	7; 5	2; 6	3; 6
4	(Sweden) (Italy)	Torsten Johansson; Orlando Sirola	4; 6	6; 1	2; 6	1; 6
5	(Sweden) (Italy)	Ulf Schmidt; Nicola Pietrangeli	5; 7	3; 6	6; 1	3; 6
