= 1955 Davis Cup Europe Zone =

International tennis competition

Details
- Duration: 29 April 1955 – 31 July 1955
- Teams: 24
- Categories: 1955 Davis Cup Europe Zone; 1955 Davis Cup America Zone; 1955 Davis Cup Eastern Zone

Champion
- Winning nation: Italy; Qualified for: 1955 Davis Cup; Inter-Zonal Finals

The Europe Zone was one of the three regional zones of the 1955 Davis Cup.

24 teams entered the Europe Zone, with the winner going on to compete in the Inter-Zonal Zone against the winners of the America Zone and Eastern Zone. Italy defeated Sweden in the final and progressed to the Inter-Zonal Zone.

== Draw ==
First Round; 29 April–8 May
Denmark
bye
Norway	1
South Africa	4
Italy
bye
West Germany	4
Ireland	1
Great Britain
bye
Austria	5
Finland	0
India
bye
Turkey	1
Egypt	4
Monaco	0
Argentina	3
bye
France
Switzerland	3
Netherlands	2
bye
Sweden
Yugoslavia	0
Chile	5
bye
Hungary
Portugal	0
Czechoslovakia	5
bye
Belgium

Second Round; 12–17 May
Copenhagen, Denmark (clay)
Denmark	3
South Africa	2
Munich, West Germany
Italy	5
West Germany	0
Vienna, Austria (clay)
Great Britain	4
Austria	1
Cairo, Egypt
India	5
Egypt	0
Paris, France (clay)
Argentina	2
France	3
Montreux, Switzerland (clay)
Switzerland	0
Sweden	5
Budapest, Hungary
Chile	3
Hungary	2
Prague, Czechoslovakia
Czechoslovakia	0
Belgium	5

Quarterfinals; 9–13 June
Copenhagen, Denmark (clay)
Denmark	0
Italy	5
Manchester, England (grass)
Great Britain	3
India	2
Saltsjöbaden, Sweden (clay)
France	2
Sweden	3
Brussels, Belgium
Chile	3
Belgium	2

Semifinals; 14–17 July
Birmingham, England (grass)
Italy	5
Great Britain	0
Båstad, Sweden (clay)
Sweden	3
Chile	2

Final; 29–31 July
Milan, Italy (clay)
Italy	4
Sweden	1

== First round ==
=== Norway vs. South Africa ===
Norway
1
Oslo, Norway
6–8 May 1955
Clay

South Africa
4

			1	2	3	4	5
1	(Norway) (South Africa)	Nils-Erik Hessen; Ian Vermaak	1; 6	1; 6	2; 6
2	(Norway) (South Africa)	Gunnar Høst Sjøwall; Russell Seymour	3; 6	3; 6	0; 6
3	(Norway) (South Africa)	Finn-Dag Jagge / Gunnar Høst Sjøwall; Abe Segal / Ian Vermaak	3; 6	4; 6	1; 6
4	(Norway) (South Africa)	Finn-Dag Jagge; Gordon Forbes	2; 6	1; 6	2; 6
5	(Norway) (South Africa)	Finn Søhol; Russell Seymour	6; 3	6; 4	2; 6	6; 4

=== West Germany vs. Ireland ===
West Germany
4
Düsseldorf, West Germany
29 April–1 May 1955

Ireland
1

			1	2	3	4	5
1	(West Germany) (Republic of Ireland)	Christoph Biederlack; Alan Haughton	6; 0	6; 0	7; 5
2	(West Germany) (Republic of Ireland)	Ernst Buchholz; Guy Jackson	7; 9	7; 5	6; 2	6; 0
3	(West Germany) (Republic of Ireland)	Ernst Buchholz / Horst Hermann; Vivian Gotto / Guy Jackson	6; 1	6; 2	6; 2
4	(West Germany) (Republic of Ireland)	Christoph Biederlack; Guy Jackson	3; 6	2; 6	2; 6
5	(West Germany) (Republic of Ireland)	Rupert Huber; Alan Haughton	6; 1	6; 2	6; 0

=== Austria vs. Finland ===
Austria
5
Vienna, Austria
29 April–1 May 1955

Finland
0

			1	2	3	4	5
1	(Austria) (Finland)	Alfred Huber; Reino Nyyssönen	8; 6	6; 0	6; 1
2	(Austria) (Finland)	Franz Saiko; Sakari Salo	6; 2	6; 2	6; 2
3	(Austria) (Finland)	Hans Redl / Franz Saiko; Lars-Henrik Krause / Sakari Salo	7; 5	6; 1	6; 0
4	(Austria) (Finland)	Franz Saiko; Reino Nyyssönen	6; 3	6; 3	6; 1
5	(Austria) (Finland)	Alfred Huber; Sakari Salo	6; 4	6; 3	7; 5

=== Turkey vs. Egypt ===
Turkey
1
Istanbul, Turkey
29 April–1 May 1955

Egypt
4

			1	2	3	4	5
1	(Turkey) (Egypt)	Behbut Cevanşir; Adel Ismail	6; 2	2; 6	5; 7	5; 7
2	(Turkey) (Egypt)	Nazmi Bari; Ibrahim Badreldin-Sayed	1; 6	6; 3	6; 4	5; 7	14; 16
3	(Turkey) (Egypt)	Engin Balas / Behbut Cevanşir; Donald Acobas / Adel Ismail	6; 1	6; 4	6; 4
4	(Turkey) (Egypt)	Nazmi Bari; Adel Ismail	4; 6	6; 4	8; 10	4; 6
5	(Turkey) (Egypt)	Engin Balas; Ibrahim Badreldin-Sayed	3; 6	0; 6	0; 6

=== Monaco vs. Argentina ===
Monaco
0
Monte Carlo, Monaco
29 April–1 May 1955

Argentina
3

			1	2	3	4	5
1	(Monaco) (Argentina)	Georges Pasquier; Alejo Russell	6; 3	3; 6	0; 6	0; 6
2	(Monaco) (Argentina)	Yvan Médecin; Enrique Morea	1; 6	1; 6	0; 6
3	(Monaco) (Argentina)	Yvan Médecin / Georges Pasquier; Enrique Morea / Alejo Russell	3; 6	1; 6	2; 6
4	(Monaco) (Argentina)	Yvan Médecin; Alejo Russell						not played
5	(Monaco) (Argentina)	Georges Pasquier; Enrique Morea						not played

=== Switzerland vs. Netherlands ===
Switzerland
3
Basel, Switzerland
29 April–1 May 1955

Netherlands
2

			1	2	3	4	5
1	(Switzerland) (Netherlands)	Martin Froesch; Hans van Dalsum	6; 0	6; 1	6; 4
2	(Switzerland) (Netherlands)	Paul Blondel; Fred Dehnert	5; 7	6; 2	4; 6	4; 6
3	(Switzerland) (Netherlands)	René Buser / Bernard du Pont; Hans van Dalsum / Fred Dehnert	3; 6	6; 0	6; 3	1; 6	2; 6
4	(Switzerland) (Netherlands)	Martin Froesch; Fred Dehnert	6; 3	6; 3	6; 0
5	(Switzerland) (Netherlands)	Paul Blondel; Hans van Swol	0; 6	6; 2	9; 7	3; 6	12; 10

=== Yugoslavia vs. Chile ===
Yugoslavia
0
Karlovac, Yugoslavia
29 April–1 May 1955

Chile
5

			1	2	3	4	5
1	(Socialist Federal Republic of Yugoslavia) (Chile)	Ilija Panajotović; Luis Ayala	3; 6	1; 6	4; 6
2	(Socialist Federal Republic of Yugoslavia) (Chile)	Vladimir Petrović; Andrés Hammersley	3; 6	6; 3	6; 4	5; 7	2; 6
3	(Socialist Federal Republic of Yugoslavia) (Chile)	Ladislav Jagec / Vladimir Petrović; Luis Ayala / Andrés Hammersley	4; 6	4; 6	4; 6
4	(Socialist Federal Republic of Yugoslavia) (Chile)	Ladislav Jagec; Andrés Hammersley	3; 6	4; 6	2; 6
5	(Socialist Federal Republic of Yugoslavia) (Chile)	Vladimir Petrović; Luis Ayala	0; 6	4; 6	3; 6

=== Portugal vs. Czechoslovakia ===
Portugal
0
Monsanto Tennis Club, Lisbon, Portugal
29 April–1 May 1955
Clay

Czechoslovakia
5

			1	2	3	4	5
1	(Portugal) (Czechoslovakia)	David Cohen; Vladimír Zábrodský	0; 6	1; 6	2; 6
2	(Portugal) (Czechoslovakia)	José da Silva; Jiří Javorský	0; 6	1; 6	3; 6
3	(Portugal) (Czechoslovakia)	António Azevedo Gomes / José da Silva; Jiří Javorský / Vladimír Zábrodský	1; 6	0; 6	0; 6
4	(Portugal) (Czechoslovakia)	José da Silva; Vladimír Zábrodský	4; 6	2; 6	0; 6
5	(Portugal) (Czechoslovakia)	David Cohen; Jiří Javorský	2; 6	0; 6	1; 6

== Second round ==
=== Denmark vs. South Africa ===
Denmark
3
Copenhagen, Denmark
13–15 May 1955
Clay

South Africa
2

			1	2	3	4	5
1	(Denmark) (South Africa)	Kurt Nielsen; Ian Vermaak	4; 6	6; 1	6; 2	1; 6	8; 6
2	(Denmark) (South Africa)	Jørgen Ulrich; Abe Segal	3; 6	6; 3	6; 2	6; 4
3	(Denmark) (South Africa)	Søren Højberg / Kurt Nielsen; Abe Segal / Ian Vermaak	11; 9	13; 15	1; 6	5; 7
4	(Denmark) (South Africa)	Jørgen Ulrich; Gordon Forbes	6; 2	1; 6	9; 11	3; 6
5	(Denmark) (South Africa)	Kurt Nielsen; Abe Segal	6; 2	6; 3	9; 7

=== West Germany vs. Italy ===
West Germany
0
Munich, West Germany
14–17 May 1955

Italy
5

			1	2	3	4	5
1	(West Germany) (Italy)	Christoph Biederlack; Fausto Gardini	2; 6	0; 6	1; 6
2	(West Germany) (Italy)	Rupert Huber; Giuseppe Merlo	2; 6	3; 6	3; 6
3	(West Germany) (Italy)	Ernst Buchholz / Horst Hermann; Nicola Pietrangeli / Orlando Sirola	1; 6	4; 6	6; 2	6; 8
4	(West Germany) (Italy)	Rupert Huber; Fausto Gardini	0; 6	3; 6	3; 6
5	(West Germany) (Italy)	Christoph Biederlack; Giuseppe Merlo	1; 6	6; 8	1; 6

=== Austria vs. Great Britain ===
Austria
1
Vienna, Austria
13–15 May 1955
Clay

Great Britain
4

			1	2	3	4	5
1	(Austria) (United Kingdom)	Alfred Huber; Roger Becker	6; 4	9; 7	0; 6	6; 4
2	(Austria) (United Kingdom)	Franz Saiko; Tony Mottram	8; 10	2; 6	4; 6
3	(Austria) (United Kingdom)	Alfred Huber / Hans Redl; Tony Mottram / Geoffrey Paish	2; 6	2; 6	4; 6
4	(Austria) (United Kingdom)	Franz Saiko; Roger Becker	2; 6	3; 6	2; 6
5	(Austria) (United Kingdom)	Alfred Huber; Tony Mottram	3; 6	7; 5	6; 2	4; 6	4; 6

=== Egypt vs. India ===
Egypt
0
Cairo, Egypt
13–15 May 1955

India
5

			1	2	3	4	5
1	(Egypt) (India)	Adel Ismail; Naresh Kumar	0; 6	3; 6	6; 4	6; 2	1; 6
2	(Egypt) (India)	Ibrahim Badreldin-Sayed; Ramanathan Krishnan	0; 6	2; 6	2; 6
3	(Egypt) (India)	Donald Acobas / Adel Ismail; Ramanathan Krishnan / Naresh Kumar	3; 6	3; 6	4; 6
4	(Egypt) (India)	Ibrahim Badreldin-Sayed; Naresh Kumar	1; 6	6; 1	4; 6	7; 5	2; 6
5	(Egypt) (India)	Adli El Shafei; Ramanathan Krishnan	1; 6	7; 9	3; 6

=== France vs. Argentina ===
France
3
Stade Roland Garros, Paris, France
13–15 May 1955
Clay

Argentina
2

			1	2	3	4	5
1	(France) (Argentina)	Paul Rémy; Alejo Russell	6; 4	6; 1	6; 4
2	(France) (Argentina)	Robert Haillet; Enrique Morea	2; 6	4; 6	6; 8
3	(France) (Argentina)	Marcel Bernard / Paul Rémy; Enrique Morea / Alejo Russell	6; 4	6; 3	6; 4
4	(France) (Argentina)	Paul Rémy; Enrique Morea	7; 9	3; 6	4; 6
5	(France) (Argentina)	Robert Haillet; Alejo Russell	6; 4	2; 6	6; 3	6; 2

=== Switzerland vs. Sweden ===
Switzerland
0
Montreux, Switzerland
13–15 May 1955
Clay

Sweden
5

			1	2	3	4	5
1	(Switzerland) (Sweden)	Martin Froesch; Sven Davidson	1; 6	5; 7	0; 6
2	(Switzerland) (Sweden)	Paul Blondel; Lennart Bergelin	2; 6	1; 6	6; 0	2; 6
3	(Switzerland) (Sweden)	Paul Blondel / René Buser; Sven Davidson / Ulf Schmidt	4; 6	2; 6	1; 6
4	(Switzerland) (Sweden)	Martin Froesch; Lennart Bergelin	6; 2	4; 6	2; 6	0; 6
5	(Switzerland) (Sweden)	Paul Blondel; Ulf Schmidt	2; 6	3; 6	4; 6

=== Hungary vs. Chile ===
Hungary
2
Budapest, Hungary
12–14 May 1955

Chile
3

			1	2	3	4	5
1	(Hungary) (Chile)	József Asbóth; Andrés Hammersley	2; 6	3; 6	6; 4	12; 10	4; 6
2	(Hungary) (Chile)	András Ádám-Stolpa; Luis Ayala	3; 6	3; 6	3; 6
3	(Hungary) (Chile)	András Ádám-Stolpa / József Asbóth; Luis Ayala / Andrés Hammersley	7; 5	7; 5	6; 4
4	(Hungary) (Chile)	József Asbóth; Luis Ayala	6; 3	3; 6	7; 5	2; 6	0; 6
5	(Hungary) (Chile)	András Ádám-Stolpa; Andrés Hammersley	3; 6	7; 5	5; 7	7; 5	6; 1

=== Czechoslovakia vs. Belgium ===
Czechoslovakia
0
Prague, Czechoslovakia
13–15 May 1955

Belgium
5

			1	2	3	4	5
1	(Czechoslovakia) (Belgium)	Jiří Javorský; Philippe Washer	0; 6	1; 6	6; 3	4; 6
2	(Czechoslovakia) (Belgium)	Vladimír Zábrodský; Jacques Brichant	6; 8	3; 6	6; 2	4; 6
3	(Czechoslovakia) (Belgium)	Jiří Javorský / Vladimír Zábrodský; Jacques Brichant / Philippe Washer	1; 6	6; 3	3; 6	7; 9
4	(Czechoslovakia) (Belgium)	Vladimír Zábrodský; Philippe Washer	2; 6	1; 6	6; 3	4; 6
5	(Czechoslovakia) (Belgium)	Jiří Javorský; Jacques Brichant	2; 6	9; 11	6; 3	8; 10

== Quarterfinals ==
=== Denmark vs. Italy ===
Denmark
0
Copenhagen, Denmark
10–12 June 1955
Clay

Italy
5

			1	2	3	4	5
1	(Denmark) (Italy)	Kurt Nielsen; Fausto Gardini	2; 6	3; 6	1; 6
2	(Denmark) (Italy)	Torben Ulrich; Giuseppe Merlo	3; 6	4; 6	6; 3	0; 6
3	(Denmark) (Italy)	Kurt Nielsen / Torben Ulrich; Nicola Pietrangeli / Orlando Sirola	14; 16	3; 6	1; 6
4	(Denmark) (Italy)	Kurt Nielsen; Giuseppe Merlo	0; 6	6; 4	2; 6	6; 4	5; 7
5	(Denmark) (Italy)	Jørgen Ulrich; Nicola Pietrangeli	4; 6	2; 6	3; 6

=== Great Britain vs. India ===
Great Britain
3
Northern Lawn Tennis Club, Manchester, England
9–13 June 1955
Grass

India
2

			1	2	3	4	5
1	(United Kingdom) (India)	Roger Becker; Naresh Kumar	6; 2	7; 9	6; 2	6; 3
2	(United Kingdom) (India)	Tony Mottram; Ramanathan Krishnan	4; 6	0; 6	2; 6
3	(United Kingdom) (India)	Tony Mottram / Geoffrey Paish; Ramanathan Krishnan / Naresh Kumar	6; 2	6; 1	3; 6	5; 7	4; 6
4	(United Kingdom) (India)	Roger Becker; Ramanathan Krishnan	13; 11	6; 3	6; 3
5	(United Kingdom) (India)	Tony Mottram; Naresh Kumar	2; 6	9; 7	4; 6	7; 5	6; 3

=== Sweden vs. France ===
Sweden
3
Saltsjöbaden, Sweden
10–12 June 1955
Clay

France
2

			1	2	3	4	5
1	(Sweden) (France)	Lennart Bergelin; Robert Haillet	3; 6	6; 2	6; 3	6; 3
2	(Sweden) (France)	Sven Davidson; Paul Rémy	3; 6	6; 3	6; 2	2; 6	1; 6
3	(Sweden) (France)	Sven Davidson / Ulf Schmidt; Marcel Bernard / Paul Rémy	4; 6	7; 5	4; 6	6; 1	2; 6
4	(Sweden) (France)	Sven Davidson; Robert Haillet	11; 9	6; 2	9; 7
5	(Sweden) (France)	Lennart Bergelin; Paul Rémy	1; 6	6; 1	6; 2	6; 2

=== Belgium vs. Chile ===
Belgium
2
Brussels, Belgium
10–12 June 1955

Chile
3

			1	2	3	4	5
1	(Belgium) (Chile)	Jacques Brichant; Andrés Hammersley	5; 7	6; 4	8; 6	8; 6
2	(Belgium) (Chile)	Philippe Washer; Luis Ayala	1; 6	6; 8	1; 6
3	(Belgium) (Chile)	Jacques Brichant / Philippe Washer; Luis Ayala / Andrés Hammersley	6; 4	0; 6	6; 4	4; 6	6; 4
4	(Belgium) (Chile)	Jacques Brichant; Luis Ayala	6; 1	1; 6	9; 7	1; 6	5; 7
5	(Belgium) (Chile)	Philippe Washer; Andrés Hammersley	2; 6	6; 4	4; 6	6; 0	4; 6

== Semifinals ==
=== Great Britain vs. Italy ===
Great Britain
0
Edgbaston Lawn Tennis Club, Birmingham, England
14–16 July 1955
Grass

Italy
5

			1	2	3	4	5
1	(United Kingdom) (Italy)	Billy Knight; Fausto Gardini	9; 7	2; 6	4; 6	1; 6
2	(United Kingdom) (Italy)	Roger Becker; Nicola Pietrangeli	3; 6	9; 7	4; 6	6; 8
3	(United Kingdom) (Italy)	Mike Davies / Bobby Wilson; Nicola Pietrangeli / Orlando Sirola	6; 4	9; 11	6; 8	3; 6
4	(United Kingdom) (Italy)	Billy Knight; Nicola Pietrangeli	6; 3	6; 4	4; 6	3; 6	4; 6
5	(United Kingdom) (Italy)	Roger Becker; Orlando Sirola	8; 10	2; 6	5; 7

=== Sweden vs. Chile ===
Sweden
3
Båstad Tennis Stadium, Båstad, Sweden
15–17 July 1955
Clay

Chile
2

			1	2	3	4	5
1	(Sweden) (Chile)	Sven Davidson; Luis Ayala	6; 1	5; 7	5; 7	3; 6
2	(Sweden) (Chile)	Lennart Bergelin; Andrés Hammersley	5; 7	7; 5	6; 2	6; 3
3	(Sweden) (Chile)	Sven Davidson / Torsten Johansson; Luis Ayala / Andrés Hammersley	6; 0	6; 1	6; 4
4	(Sweden) (Chile)	Lennart Bergelin; Luis Ayala	4; 6	6; 4	2; 6	1; 6
5	(Sweden) (Chile)	Sven Davidson; Andrés Hammersley	6; 1	6; 1	6; 3

== Final ==
=== Italy vs. Sweden ===
Italy
4
Milan, Italy
29–31 July 1955
Clay

Sweden
1

			1	2	3	4	5
1	(Italy) (Sweden)	Fausto Gardini; Sven Davidson	6; 4	0; 6	3; 6	6; 1	6; 3
2	(Italy) (Sweden)	Giuseppe Merlo; Lennart Bergelin	6; 1	6; 8	6; 8	8; 6	6; 1
3	(Italy) (Sweden)	Nicola Pietrangeli / Orlando Sirola; Sven Davidson / Torsten Johansson	6; 3	6; 4	2; 6	2; 6	6; 1
4	(Italy) (Sweden)	Orlando Sirola; Sven Davidson	2; 6	6; 8	4; 6
5	(Italy) (Sweden)	Fausto Gardini; Staffan Stockenberg	6; 4	6; 1	6; 4
