= 1959 Davis Cup Eastern Zone =

International tennis competition

The Eastern Zone was one of the three regional zones of the 1959 Davis Cup.

8 teams entered the Eastern Zone, with the winner going on to compete in the Inter-Zonal Zone against the winners of the America Zone and Europe Zone. India defeated the Philippines in the final and progressed to the Inter-Zonal Zone.

== Draw ==
Quarterfinals; 21 March–12 April
Tokyo, Japan
Ceylon	0
Japan	5
India	w/o
South Korea
Iran
Thailand	w/o
Manila, Philippines
Malaya	0
Philippines	5

Semifinals; 25 April–3 May
Tokyo, Japan
Japan	2
India	3
Bangkok, Thailand
Thailand	0
Philippines	5

Final; 1 June
Calcutta, India
India	4
Philippines	1

== Quarterfinals ==
=== Japan vs. Ceylon ===
Japan
5
Tokyo, Japan
10–12 April 1959

Ceylon
0

			1	2	3	4	5
1	(Japan) (Dominion of Ceylon)	Atsushi Miyagi; Bernard Pinto	6; 0	6; 1	6; 0
2	(Japan) (Dominion of Ceylon)	Kosei Kamo; Rupert Ferdinands	6; 2	6; 0	6; 4
3	(Japan) (Dominion of Ceylon)	Atsushi Miyagi / Yoshihisa Shibata; Rupert Ferdinands / Bernard Pinto	12; 10	6; 3	6; 2
4	(Japan) (Dominion of Ceylon)	Susumu Matsuura; Rupert Ferdinands	6; 4	7; 5	6; 0
5	(Japan) (Dominion of Ceylon)	Kosei Kamo; Bernard Pinto	6; 2	6; 1	6; 2

=== Philippines vs. Malaya ===
Philippines
5
Manila, Philippines
21–23 March 1959

Malaya
0

			1	2	3	4	5
1	(Philippines) (Federation of Malaya)	Felicisimo Ampon; Moses Tay	6; 1	6; 1	6; 1
2	(Philippines) (Federation of Malaya)	Raymundo Deyro; Chew-Bee Ong	6; 4	6; 1	6; 2
3	(Philippines) (Federation of Malaya)	Eduardo Dungo / Juan-Johnson José; Chew-Bee Ong / Moses Tay	6; 3	6; 3	6; 3
4	(Philippines) (Federation of Malaya)	Eduardo Dungo; Moses Tay	6; 2	6; 3	6; 1
5	(Philippines) (Federation of Malaya)	Juan-Johnson José; Chew-Bee Ong	6; 1	6; 2	6; 3

== Semifinals ==
=== Japan vs. India ===
Japan
2
Tokyo, Japan
1–3 May 1959

India
3

			1	2	3	4	5
1	(Japan) (India)	Susumu Matsuura; Ramanathan Krishnan	2; 6	4; 6	4; 6
2	(Japan) (India)	Kosei Kamo; Naresh Kumar	6; 3	1; 6	6; 0	8; 6
3	(Japan) (India)	Atsushi Miyagi / Yoshihisa Shibata; Ramanathan Krishnan / Naresh Kumar	3; 6	4; 6	4; 6
4	(Japan) (India)	Kosei Kamo; Ramanathan Krishnan	6; 3	2; 6	0; 6	5; 7
5	(Japan) (India)	Susumu Matsuura; Naresh Kumar	3; 6	6; 3	6; 3	4; 6	6; 3

=== Thailand vs. Philippines ===
Thailand
0
Bangkok, Thailand
25–27 April 1959

Philippines
5

			1	2	3	4	5
1	(Thailand) (Philippines)	Sutiraphan Karalak; Raymundo Deyro	1; 6	2; 6	7; 5	1; 6
2	(Thailand) (Philippines)	Suthep Bulakul; Felicisimo Ampon	0; 6	0; 6	3; 6
3	(Thailand) (Philippines)	Sutiraphan Karalak / Kravi Sudasna; Raymundo Deyro / Juan-Johnson José	4; 6	2; 6	5; 7
4	(Thailand) (Philippines)	Sutiraphan Karalak; Felicisimo Ampon	0; 6	6; 4	2; 6	1; 6
5	(Thailand) (Philippines)	Suthep Bulakul; Raymundo Deyro	0; 6	0; 6	3; 6

== Final ==
=== India vs. Philippines ===
India
4
Calcutta, India
1 June 1959

Philippines
1

			1	2	3	4	5
1	(India) (Philippines)	Naresh Kumar; Raymundo Deyro	6; 2	6; 2	6; 3
2	(India) (Philippines)	Ramanathan Krishnan; Felicisimo Ampon	6; 2	6; 2	6; 3
3	(India) (Philippines)	Ramanathan Krishnan / Naresh Kumar; Raymundo Deyro / Juan-Johnson José	6; 3	8; 6	6; 2
4	(India) (Philippines)	Ramanathan Krishnan; Juan-Johnson José	6; 1	6; 4	6; 1
5	(India) (Philippines)	Premjit Lall; Felicisimo Ampon	6; 8	1; 6	6; 4	6; 2	1; 6
