= 1956 Davis Cup Eastern Zone =

International tennis competition

The Eastern Zone was one of the three regional zones of the 1956 Davis Cup.

3 teams entered the Eastern Zone, with the winner going on to compete in the Inter-Zonal Zone against the winners of the America Zone and Europe Zone. India defeated Japan in the final and progressed to the Inter-Zonal Zone.

== Draw ==
Semifinals; 22–24 March
Japan
bye
Colombo, Ceylon (clay)
Ceylon | 0
India | 5

Final; 18–20 May
Tokyo, Japan
Japan | 2
India | 3

== Semifinals ==
=== Ceylon vs. India ===
Ceylon
0
Ceylon Lawn Tennis Association, Colombo, Ceylon
22–24 March 1956
Clay

India
5

| | | | 1 | 2 | 3 | 4 | 5 |
|---|---|---|---|---|---|---|---|
| 1 | (Dominion of Ceylon) (India) | Rupert Ferdinands; Naresh Kumar | 2; 6 | 4; 6 | 2; 6 |
| 2 | (Dominion of Ceylon) (India) | Percy Ernst; Ramanathan Krishnan | 0; 6 | 1; 6 | 2; 6 |
| 3 | (Dominion of Ceylon) (India) | Rupert Ferdinands / Bernard Pinto; Ramanathan Krishnan / Naresh Kumar | 5; 7 | 2; 6 | 2; 6 |
| 4 | (Dominion of Ceylon) (India) | Bernard Pinto; A.J. Udaykumar | 4; 6 | 9; 7 | 1; 6 | 0; 6 |
| 5 | (Dominion of Ceylon) (India) | Koo De Saram; Ramanathan Krishnan | 1; 6 | 1; 6 | 2; 6 |

== Final ==
=== Japan vs. India ===
Japan
2
Tokyo, Japan
18–20 May 1956

India
3

| | | | 1 | 2 | 3 | 4 | 5 |
|---|---|---|---|---|---|---|---|
| 1 | (Japan) (India) | Atsushi Miyagi; Ramanathan Krishnan | 3; 6 | 0; 6 | 3; 6 |
| 2 | (Japan) (India) | Kosei Kamo; Naresh Kumar | 6; 2 | 4; 6 | 2; 6 | 6; 4 | 6; 0 |
| 3 | (Japan) (India) | Kosei Kamo / Atsushi Miyagi; Ramanathan Krishnan / Naresh Kumar | 4; 6 | 3; 6 | 1; 6 |
| 4 | (Japan) (India) | Atsushi Miyagi; Naresh Kumar | 6; 4 | 6; 1 | 6; 1 |
| 5 | (Japan) (India) | Kosei Kamo; Ramanathan Krishnan | 8; 6 | 3; 6 | 4; 6 | 5; 7 |
