= 1955 Davis Cup Eastern Zone =

International tennis competition

The Eastern Zone was one of the three regional zones of the 1955 Davis Cup.

3 teams entered the Eastern Zone, with the winner going on to compete in the Inter-Zonal Zone against the winners of the America Zone and Europe Zone. Japan defeated the Philippines in the final and progressed to the Inter-Zonal Zone.

== Draw ==
Semifinals; 28–30 March
Japan
bye
Rangoon, Burma
Burma | 0
Philippines | 5

Final; 27–29 May
Tokyo, Japan
Japan | 3
Philippines | 2

== Semifinals ==
=== Burma vs. Philippines ===
Burma
0
Rangoon, Burma
28–30 March 1955

Philippines
5

| | | | 1 | 2 | 3 | 4 | 5 |
|---|---|---|---|---|---|---|---|
| 1 | (Myanmar) (Philippines) | Ko Ko; Felicisimo Ampon | 1; 6 | 1; 6 | 0; 6 |
| 2 | (Myanmar) (Philippines) | Joe Ba Maung; Raymundo Deyro | 0; 6 | 0; 6 | 2; 6 |
| 3 | (Myanmar) (Philippines) | Joe Ba Maung / Ba Thaung; Felicisimo Ampon / Raymundo Deyro | 0; 6 | 0; 6 | 0; 6 |
| 4 | (Myanmar) (Philippines) | Ba Thaung; Raymundo Deyro | 1; 6 | 2; 6 | 2; 6 |
| 5 | (Myanmar) (Philippines) | Joe Ba Maung; Juan-Johnson José | 3; 6 | 4; 6 | 2; 6 |

== Final ==
=== Japan vs. Philippines ===
Japan
3
Tokyo, Japan
27–29 May 1955

Philippines
2

| | | | 1 | 2 | 3 | 4 | 5 |
|---|---|---|---|---|---|---|---|
| 1 | (Japan) (Philippines) | Kosei Kamo; Raymundo Deyro | 6; 4 | 6; 8 | 6; 1 | 2; 6 | 7; 5 |
| 2 | (Japan) (Philippines) | Atsushi Miyagi; Felicisimo Ampon | 3; 6 | 6; 4 | 1; 6 | 6; 0 | 6; 3 |
| 3 | (Japan) (Philippines) | Kosei Kamo / Atsushi Miyagi; Felicisimo Ampon / Raymundo Deyro | 3; 6 | 3; 6 | 2; 6 |
| 4 | (Japan) (Philippines) | Kosei Kamo; Felicisimo Ampon | 1; 6 | 6; 4 | 6; 2 | 6; 0 |
| 5 | (Japan) (Philippines) | Atsushi Miyagi; Raymundo Deyro | 2; 6 | 3; 6 | 4; 6 |
