= 1955 Davis Cup America Zone =

International tennis competition

The America Zone was one of the three regional zones of the 1955 Davis Cup.

7 teams entered the America Zone, with the winner going on to compete in the Inter-Zonal Zone against the winners of the Eastern Zone and Europe Zone. Australia defeated Canada in the final and progressed to the Inter-Zonal Zone.

== Draw ==
Quarterfinals; 15–17 July
Canada
bye
Caribbean/West Indies	w/o
Pakistan
Havana, Cuba
Cuba	1
Brazil	4
Chicago, IL, United States (clay)
Mexico	0
Australia	5

Semifinals; 22–24 July
Montreal, Canada (grass)
Canada	5
Caribbean/West Indies	0
Louisville, KY, United States (grass)
Brazil	1
Australia	4

Final; 29–31 July
Montreal, Canada (grass)
Canada	0
Australia	5

== Quarterfinals ==
=== Cuba vs. Brazil ===
Cuba
1
Havana, Cuba
15–17 July 1955

Brazil
4

			1	2	3	4	5
1	(Cuba) (Brazil)	Reynaldo Garrido; Bob Falkenburg	2; 6	3; 6	1; 6
2	(Cuba) (Brazil)	Orlando Garrido; Ronald Moreira	1; 6	4; 6	7; 5	6; 8
3	(Cuba) (Brazil)	Orlando Garrido / Juan Weiss; Bob Falkenburg / Ronald Moreira	9; 7	4; 6	3; 6	1; 6
4	(Cuba) (Brazil)	Orlando Garrido; José Agüero	6; 3	5; 7	4; 6	4; 6
5	(Cuba) (Brazil)	Reynaldo Garrido; Ronald Moreira	2; 6	6; 4	6; 3	6; 2

=== Australia vs. Mexico ===
Australia
5
Saddle and Cycle Club, Chicago, IL, United States
15–17 July 1955
Clay

Mexico
0

			1	2	3	4	5
1	(Australia) (Mexico)	Ken Rosewall; Gustavo Palafox	6; 3	7; 5	6; 2
2	(Australia) (Mexico)	Rex Hartwig; Esteban Reyes Jr.	6; 0	3; 6	6; 3	6; 1
3	(Australia) (Mexico)	Rex Hartwig / Lew Hoad; Francisco Guerrero Arcocha / Gustavo Palafox	6; 1	6; 2	6; 4
4	(Australia) (Mexico)	Ken Rosewall; Esteban Reyes Jr.	6; 2	6; 4	6; 3
5	(Australia) (Mexico)	Rex Hartwig; Gustavo Palafox	6; 3	6; 3	6; 3

== Semifinals ==
=== Canada vs. Caribbean/West Indies ===
Canada
5
Mount Royal Tennis Club, Montreal, Canada
22–24 July 1955
Grass

Caribbean/West Indies
0

			1	2	3	4	5
1	(Canada) (Cricket West Indies)	Robert Bedard; Ian McDonald	6; 2	3; 6	6; 4	6; 2
2	(Canada) (Cricket West Indies)	Lorne Main; Frank Mott-Trille	12; 10	6; 3	2; 6	6; 4
3	(Canada) (Cricket West Indies)	Robert Bedard / Don Fontana; Ian McDonald / Frank Mott-Trille	6; 4	6; 2	7; 5
4	(Canada) (Cricket West Indies)	Don Fontana; Peter Philips	6; 0	6; 3	6; 3
5	(Canada) (Cricket West Indies)	Lorne Main; Ian McDonald	6; 2	4; 6	7; 5	2; 6	6; 4

=== Australia vs. Brazil ===
Australia
4
Louisville Boat Club, Louisville, KY, United States
22–24 July 1955
Grass

Brazil
1

			1	2	3	4	5
1	(Australia) (Brazil)	Ken Rosewall; José Agüero	7; 5	6; 0	4; 6	6; 3
2	(Australia) (Brazil)	Lew Hoad; Bob Falkenburg	3; 6	8; 6	7; 5	6; 1
3	(Australia) (Brazil)	Rex Hartwig / Lew Hoad; Bob Falkenburg / Ronald Moreira	6; 2	6; 4	6; 1
4	(Australia) (Brazil)	Lew Hoad; Ronald Moreira	4; 6	4; 6	4; 6
5	(Australia) (Brazil)	Ken Rosewall; Bob Falkenburg	6; 2	6; 2	6; 3

== Final ==
=== Canada vs. Australia ===
Canada
0
Mount Royal Tennis Club, Montreal, Canada
29–31 July 1955
Grass

Australia
5

			1	2	3	4	5
1	(Canada) (Australia)	Robert Bedard; Ken Rosewall	0; 6	1; 6	6; 4	2; 6
2	(Canada) (Australia)	Lorne Main; Rex Hartwig	3; 6	3; 6	3; 6
3	(Canada) (Australia)	Robert Bedard / Don Fontana; Rex Hartwig / Lew Hoad	3; 6	6; 3	3; 6	4; 6
4	(Canada) (Australia)	Don Fontana; Lew Hoad	7; 9	5; 7	1; 6
5	(Canada) (Australia)	Henri Rochon; Ken Rosewall	1; 6	2; 6	1; 6
