= 1959 Davis Cup Europe Zone =

International tennis competition

Details
- Duration: 17 April 1959 – 27 July 1959
- Teams: 27
- Categories: 1959 Davis Cup America Zone; 1959 Davis Cup Eastern Zone; 1959 Davis Cup Europe Zone

Champion
- Winning nation: Italy; Qualified for: 1959 Davis Cup; Inter-Zonal Finals

The Europe Zone was one of the three regional zones of the 1959 Davis Cup.

The seeding system for the Europe Zone was modified so that only the previous year's semifinalists were guaranteed first round byes, allowing more countries to compete. 27 teams entered the Europe Zone, with the winner going on to compete in the Inter-Zonal Zone against the winners of the America Zone and Eastern Zone.

Italy defeated Spain in the final and progressed to the Inter-Zonal Zone.

== Draw ==
First Round; 17 April–4 May
Italy
bye
Belgium	4
Netherlands	1
Lebanon	1
Colombia	4
Norway	0
South Africa	5
Egypt	2
Romania	3
Ireland	0
New Zealand	5
Yugoslavia	1
Denmark	4
bye
France
Poland
bye
West Germany	0
Brazil	4
Finland	0
Spain	5
Israel	2
Switzerland	3
Sweden	5
Hungary	0
Austria	1
Chile	3
bye
Luxembourg
bye
Great Britain

Second Round; 1–18 May
Brussels, Belgium
Italy	4
Belgium	1
Bournemouth, England (clay)
Colombia	0
South Africa	5
Bucharest, Romania (clay)
Romania	3
New Zealand	2
Copenhagen, Denmark (clay)
Denmark	0
France	5
Warsaw, Poland
Poland	2
Brazil	3
Madrid, Spain (clay)
Spain	5
Switzerland	0
Stockholm, Sweden (clay)
Sweden	2
Chile	3
Mondorf-les-Bains, Luxembourg (clay)
Luxembourg	0
Great Britain	5

Quarterfinals; 11–15 June
Florence, Italy (clay)
Italy	4
South Africa	1
Paris, France (clay)
Romania	0
France	5
Barcelona, Spain (clay)
Brazil	2
Spain	3
Eastbourne, England (grass)
Chile	2
Great Britain	3

Semifinals; 9–12 July
Sanremo, Italy (clay)
Italy	4
France	1
Barcelona, Spain (clay)
Spain	3
Great Britain	2

Final; 24–27 July
Milan, Italy (clay)
Italy	4
Spain	1

== First round ==
=== Belgium vs. Netherlands ===
Belgium
4
Brussels, Belgium
1–3 May 1959

Netherlands
1

			1	2	3	4	5
1	(Belgium) (Netherlands)	Jacques Brichant; Pieter van Eijsden	6; 1	6; 2	6; 3
2	(Belgium) (Netherlands)	Jean-Pierre Froment; Willem Maris	4; 6	4; 6	5; 7
3	(Belgium) (Netherlands)	Jacques Brichant / Philippe Washer; Willem Maris / Hans van de Weg	6; 4	6; 4	6; 0
4	(Belgium) (Netherlands)	Jean-Pierre Froment; Pieter van Eijsden	6; 3	6; 3	11; 9
5	(Belgium) (Netherlands)	Jacques Brichant; Willem Maris	6; 2	6; 0	6; 1

=== Lebanon vs. Colombia ===
Lebanon
1
Renaissance Club, Beirut, Lebanon
1–3 May 1959
Clay

Colombia
4

			1	2	3	4	5
1	(Lebanon) (Colombia)	Karim Fawaz; William Álvarez	0; 6	2; 6	3; 6
2	(Lebanon) (Colombia)	Samir El Khoury; Hernando Salas	6; 2	4; 6	6; 4	6; 2
3	(Lebanon) (Colombia)	Elie Attieh / Nadin Hajjar; William Álvarez / Hernando Salas	5; 7	3; 6	6; 4	3; 6
4	(Lebanon) (Colombia)	Karim Fawaz; Hernando Salas	6; 8	1; 6	4; 6
5	(Lebanon) (Colombia)	Samir El Khoury; William Álvarez	0; 6	7; 9	1; 6

=== Norway vs. South Africa ===
Norway
0
Oslo, Norway
1–3 May 1959
Clay

South Africa
5

			1	2	3	4	5
1	(Norway) (South Africa)	Finn-Dag Jagge; Gordon Forbes	1; 6	1; 6	0; 6
2	(Norway) (South Africa)	Gunnar Høst Sjøwall; Abe Segal	2; 6	1; 6	3; 6
3	(Norway) (South Africa)	Finn-Dag Jagge / Gunnar Høst Sjøwall; Gordon Forbes / Abe Segal	3; 6	2; 6	3; 6
4	(Norway) (South Africa)	Gunnar Høst Sjøwall; Raymond Weedon	5; 7	6; 4	1; 6	8; 6	5; 7
5	(Norway) (South Africa)	Rolf Pape; Abe Segal	4; 6	0; 6	5; 7

=== Egypt vs. Romania ===
Egypt
2
Cairo, Egypt
17–19 April 1959

Romania
3

			1	2	3	4	5
1	(Egypt) (Romania)	Kamel Moubarek; Constantin Năstase	6; 1	6; 4	2; 6	6; 2
2	(Egypt) (Romania)	Ibrahim Badreldin-Sayed; Gheorghe Viziru	1; 6	3; 6	2; 6
3	(Egypt) (Romania)	Fathi Mohammed-Ali / Nabil Hassan; Gheorghe Viziru / Marian Viziru	3; 6	4; 6	3; 6
4	(Egypt) (Romania)	Ibrahim Badreldin-Sayed; Constantin Năstase	8; 10	6; 0	3; 6	7; 5	6; 1
5	(Egypt) (Romania)	Kamel Moubarek; Gheorghe Viziru	4; 6	6; 3	6; 0	6; 8	4; 6

=== Ireland vs. New Zealand ===
Ireland
0
Dublin, Ireland
30 April–2 May 1959

New Zealand
5

			1	2	3	4	5
1	(Republic of Ireland) (New Zealand)	Peter Jackson; Lew Gerrard	1; 6	6; 8	4; 6
2	(Republic of Ireland) (New Zealand)	Joseph Hackett; Mark Otway	3; 6	3; 6	1; 6
3	(Republic of Ireland) (New Zealand)	Joseph Hackett / Guy Jackson; Lew Gerrard / Mark Otway	2; 6	6; 1	4; 6	5; 7
4	(Republic of Ireland) (New Zealand)	Peter Jackson; Mark Otway	2; 6	3; 6	2; 6
5	(Republic of Ireland) (New Zealand)	James Buckley; Brian Woolf	4; 6	3; 6	2; 6

=== Yugoslavia vs. Denmark ===
Yugoslavia
1
Zagreb, Yugoslavia
25–27 April 1959
Clay

Denmark
4

			1	2	3	4	5
1	(Socialist Federal Republic of Yugoslavia) (Denmark)	Kamilo Keretić; Kurt Nielsen	0; 6	3; 6	2; 6
2	(Socialist Federal Republic of Yugoslavia) (Denmark)	Ilija Panajotović; Torben Ulrich	2; 6	4; 6	7; 9
3	(Socialist Federal Republic of Yugoslavia) (Denmark)	Boro Jovanović / Ilija Panajotović; Kurt Nielsen / Torben Ulrich	8; 6	6; 4	4; 6	4; 6	15; 13
4	(Socialist Federal Republic of Yugoslavia) (Denmark)	Ilija Panajotović; Kurt Nielsen	4; 6	4; 6	2; 6
5	(Socialist Federal Republic of Yugoslavia) (Denmark)	Boro Jovanović; Torben Ulrich	6; 4	6; 8	3; 6	1; 6

=== West Germany vs. Brazil ===
West Germany
0
West Berlin
1–3 May 1959

Brazil
4

			1	2	3	4	5
1	(West Germany) (Brazil)	Wilhelm Bungert; Carlos Alberto Fernandes	2; 6	4; 6	4; 6
2	(West Germany) (Brazil)	Dieter Ecklebe; Ronald Barnes	8; 6	3; 6	3; 6	2; 6
3	(West Germany) (Brazil)	Wilhelm Bungert / Dieter Ecklebe; Ronald Barnes / Carlos Alberto Fernandes	6; 1	8; 10	2; 6	2; 6
4	(West Germany) (Brazil)	Dieter Ecklebe; Carlos Alberto Fernandes	1; 6	6; 8	3; 6
5	(West Germany) (Brazil)	Wilhelm Bungert; Ronald Barnes	8; 10	4; 3				not completed

=== Finland vs. Spain ===
Finland
0
Helsinki, Finland
1–3 May 1959

Spain
5

			1	2	3	4	5
1	(Finland) (Spain)	Sakari Salo; Andrés Gimeno	2; 6	1; 6	2; 6
2	(Finland) (Spain)	Reino Nyyssönen; Juan Manuel Couder	2; 6	4; 6	6; 8
3	(Finland) (Spain)	Reino Nyyssönen / Sakari Salo; Alberto Arilla / Andrés Gimeno	4; 6	3; 6	2; 6
4	(Finland) (Spain)	Reino Nyyssönen; Andrés Gimeno	4; 6	3; 6	2; 6
5	(Finland) (Spain)	Sakari Salo; Manuel Santana	3; 6	1; 6	1; 6

=== Israel vs. Switzerland ===
Israel
2
Tel Aviv, Israel
23–25 April 1959
Hard

Switzerland
3

			1	2	3	4	5
1	(Israel) (Switzerland)	Eleazar Davidman; Martin Froesch	2; 6	4; 6	7; 9
2	(Israel) (Switzerland)	Arie Avidan-Weiss; Paul Blondel	2; 6	4; 6	3; 6
3	(Israel) (Switzerland)	Arie Avidan-Weiss / Eleazar Davidman; Paul Blondel / Martin Froesch	4; 6	6; 4	6; 3	6; 1
4	(Israel) (Switzerland)	Arie Avidan-Weiss; Martin Froesch	4; 6	4; 6	2; 6
5	(Israel) (Switzerland)	Eleazar Davidman; Paul Blondel	6; 3	6; 1	6; 2

=== Sweden vs. Hungary ===
Sweden
5
Tennisstadion, Stockholm, Sweden
1–4 May 1959
Clay

Hungary
0

			1	2	3	4	5
1	(Sweden) (Hungary)	Jan-Erik Lundqvist; András Ádám-Stolpa	6; 4	6; 4	6; 3
2	(Sweden) (Hungary)	Ulf Schmidt; István Gulyás	7; 5	6; 4	6; 1
3	(Sweden) (Hungary)	Sven Davidson / Ulf Schmidt; András Ádám-Stolpa / István Gulyás	6; 4	6; 1	9; 7
4	(Sweden) (Hungary)	Jan-Erik Lundqvist; István Gulyás	6; 3	7; 5	6; 1
5	(Sweden) (Hungary)	Ulf Schmidt; András Ádám-Stolpa	2; 6	6; 3	6; 4	7; 5

=== Austria vs. Chile ===
Austria
1
Vienna, Austria
1–3 May 1959

Chile
3

			1	2	3	4	5
1	(Austria) (Chile)	Franz Saiko; Patricio Rodríguez	6; 1	6; 4	7; 5
2	(Austria) (Chile)	Franz Hainka; Luis Ayala	4; 6	4; 6	2; 6
3	(Austria) (Chile)	Peter Böck / Franz Saiko; Ernesto Aguirre / Luis Ayala	6; 8	4; 6	6; 2	0; 6
4	(Austria) (Chile)	Franz Hainka; Patricio Rodríguez	6; 1	0; 6	6; 3	4; 6	3; 6
5	(Austria) (Chile)	Franz Saiko; Luis Ayala						not played

== Second round ==
=== Belgium vs. Italy ===
Belgium
1
Brussels, Belgium
16–18 May 1959

Italy
4

			1	2	3	4	5
1	(Belgium) (Italy)	Jacques Brichant; Nicola Pietrangeli	4; 6	8; 6	6; 1	1; 6	2; 6
2	(Belgium) (Italy)	Jean-Pierre Froment; Orlando Sirola	2; 6	2; 6	3; 6
3	(Belgium) (Italy)	Jacques Brichant / Philippe Washer; Nicola Pietrangeli / Orlando Sirola	2; 6	3; 6	4; 6
4	(Belgium) (Italy)	Jean-Pierre Froment; Sergio Tacchini	3; 6	6; 0	4; 6	6; 8
5	(Belgium) (Italy)	Jacques Brichant; Orlando Sirola	5; 7	6; 3	7; 5	10; 12	7; 5

=== South Africa vs. Colombia ===
South Africa
5
West Hants Lawn Tennis Club, Bournemouth, England
14–16 May 1959
Clay

Colombia
0

			1	2	3	4	5
1	(South Africa) (Colombia)	Ian Vermaak; Hernando Salas	6; 1	6; 1	6; 2
2	(South Africa) (Colombia)	Gordon Forbes; William Álvarez	6; 4	6; 1	6; 3
3	(South Africa) (Colombia)	Gordon Forbes / Abe Segal; William Álvarez / Hernando Salas	6; 4	6; 1	6; 1
4	(South Africa) (Colombia)	Ian Vermaak; William Álvarez	6; 8	6; 2	8; 6	6; 2
5	(South Africa) (Colombia)	Raymond Weedon; Hernando Salas	6; 3	6; 3	3; 6	6; 2

=== Romania vs. New Zealand ===
Romania
3
Bucharest, Romania
15–17 May 1959
Clay

New Zealand
2

			1	2	3	4	5
1	(Romania) (New Zealand)	Gheorghe Viziru; Mark Otway	3; 6	7; 5	6; 0	6; 1
2	(Romania) (New Zealand)	Ion Țiriac; Lew Gerrard	4; 6	13; 15	6; 8
3	(Romania) (New Zealand)	Gheorghe Viziru / Marian Viziru; Lew Gerrard / Mark Otway	6; 8	3; 6	2; 6
4	(Romania) (New Zealand)	Gheorghe Viziru; Lew Gerrard	6; 0	6; 4	8; 6
5	(Romania) (New Zealand)	Ion Țiriac; Mark Otway	6; 3	2; 6	6; 4	6; 4

=== Denmark vs. France ===
Denmark
0
Copenhagen, Denmark
10–12 May 1959
Clay

France
5

			1	2	3	4	5
1	(Denmark) (France)	Kurt Nielsen; Pierre Darmon	2; 6	5; 7	4; 6
2	(Denmark) (France)	Torben Ulrich; Robert Haillet	4; 6	6; 8	6; 4	1; 5		retired
3	(Denmark) (France)	Kurt Nielsen / Torben Ulrich; Jean-Noël Grinda / Jean-Claude Molinari	7; 9	4; 6	2; 6
4	(Denmark) (France)	Kurt Nielsen; Jean-Noël Grinda	7; 9	6; 8	0; 6
5	(Denmark) (France)	Søren Højberg; Jean-Claude Molinari	4; 6	2; 6	4; 6

=== Poland vs. Brazil ===
Poland
2
Warsaw, Poland
15–17 May 1959

Brazil
3

			1	2	3	4	5
1	(Poland) (Brazil)	Władysław Skonecki; Ronald Barnes	6; 1	4; 6	5; 7	6; 1	6; 1
2	(Poland) (Brazil)	Andrzej Licis; Carlos Alberto Fernandes	5; 7	6; 4	4; 6	1; 6
3	(Poland) (Brazil)	Wiesław Gąsiorek / Józef Piątek; Ronald Barnes / Carlos Alberto Fernandes	1; 6	1; 6	6; 8
4	(Poland) (Brazil)	Władysław Skonecki; Carlos Alberto Fernandes	8; 6	6; 4	8; 10	6; 1
5	(Poland) (Brazil)	Andrzej Licis; Ronald Barnes	1; 6	1; 6	2; 6

=== Spain vs. Switzerland ===
Spain
5
Alameda Tennis Club, Madrid, Spain
8–10 May 1959
Clay

Switzerland
0

			1	2	3	4	5
1	(Spain) (Switzerland)	Juan Manuel Couder; Martin Froesch	6; 2	6; 2	6; 2
2	(Spain) (Switzerland)	Andrés Gimeno; Paul Blondel	6; 1	6; 0	6; 2
3	(Spain) (Switzerland)	José Luis Arilla / Andrés Gimeno; Paul Blondel / Martin Froesch	6; 2	6; 3	6; 0
4	(Spain) (Switzerland)	Andrés Gimeno; Ernst Schori	6; 4	6; 3	6; 1
5	(Spain) (Switzerland)	Juan Manuel Couder; Paul Blondel	6; 0	6; 2	6; 3

=== Sweden vs. Chile ===
Sweden
2
Tennisstadion, Stockholm, Sweden
15–17 May 1959
Clay

Chile
3

			1	2	3	4	5
1	(Sweden) (Chile)	Jan-Erik Lundqvist; Patricio Rodríguez	6; 2	6; 4	6; 1
2	(Sweden) (Chile)	Ulf Schmidt; Luis Ayala	4; 6	4; 6	1; 6
3	(Sweden) (Chile)	Sven Davidson / Ulf Schmidt; Ernesto Aguirre / Luis Ayala	6; 2	5; 7	3; 6	5; 7
4	(Sweden) (Chile)	Jan-Erik Lundqvist; Luis Ayala	6; 3	8; 10	1; 6	3; 6
5	(Sweden) (Chile)	Ulf Schmidt; Patricio Rodríguez	6; 1	6; 2	6; 3

=== Luxembourg vs. Great Britain ===
Luxembourg
0
Mondorf-les-Bains, Luxembourg
1–3 May 1959
Clay

Great Britain
5

			1	2	3	4	5
1	(Luxembourg) (United Kingdom)	Joseph Offenheim; Alan Mills	0; 6	0; 6	0; 6
2	(Luxembourg) (United Kingdom)	Frank Baden; Billy Knight	1; 6	2; 6	6; 2	3; 6
3	(Luxembourg) (United Kingdom)	Frank Baden / Gaston Wampach; Billy Knight / Bobby Wilson	1; 6	1; 6	2; 6
4	(Luxembourg) (United Kingdom)	Joseph Offenheim; Billy Knight	0; 6	1; 6	1; 6
5	(Luxembourg) (United Kingdom)	Frank Baden; Alan Mills	1; 6	7; 5	10; 8	2; 6	2; 6

== Quarterfinals ==
=== Italy vs. South Africa ===
Italy
4
Florence, Italy
12–14 June 1959
Clay

South Africa
1

			1	2	3	4	5
1	(Italy) (South Africa)	Orlando Sirola; Ian Vermaak	6; 4	6; 3	6; 4
2	(Italy) (South Africa)	Nicola Pietrangeli; Gordon Forbes	7; 5	6; 2	6; 4
3	(Italy) (South Africa)	Nicola Pietrangeli / Orlando Sirola; Gordon Forbes / Abe Segal	6; 4	6; 3	14; 12
4	(Italy) (South Africa)	Orlando Sirola; Abe Segal	3; 6	8; 10	6; 4	4; 6
5	(Italy) (South Africa)	Giuseppe Merlo; Ian Vermaak	6; 4	6; 2	6; 4

=== France vs. Romania ===
France
5
Stade Roland Garros, Paris, France
12–14 June 1959
Clay

Romania
0

			1	2	3	4	5
1	(France) (Romania)	Robert Haillet; Gheorghe Viziru	6; 4	6; 2	6; 0
2	(France) (Romania)	Pierre Darmon; Ion Țiriac	6; 0	6; 0	8; 6
3	(France) (Romania)	Jean-Noël Grinda / Jean-Claude Molinari; Gheorghe Viziru / Marian Viziru	6; 1	6; 1	6; 4
4	(France) (Romania)	Pierre Darmon; Gheorghe Viziru	6; 3	7; 5	6; 2
5	(France) (Romania)	Robert Haillet; Ion Țiriac	6; 3	6; 3	6; 0

=== Spain vs. Brazil ===
Spain
3
Real Club de Tenis Barcelona, Barcelona, Spain
12–15 June 1959
Clay

Brazil
2

			1	2	3	4	5
1	(Spain) (Brazil)	Manuel Santana; Carlos Alberto Fernandes	8; 10	6; 4	6; 0	5; 7	6; 3
2	(Spain) (Brazil)	Juan Manuel Couder; Ronald Barnes	6; 2	6; 2	6; 8	9; 7
3	(Spain) (Brazil)	José Luis Arilla / Andrés Gimeno; Ronald Barnes / Carlos Alberto Fernandes	3; 6	2; 6	11; 9	3; 6
4	(Spain) (Brazil)	Manuel Santana; Ronald Barnes	6; 1	6; 1	6; 4
5	(Spain) (Brazil)	Andrés Gimeno; Carlos Alberto Fernandes	1; 6	5; 7	2; 6

=== Great Britain vs. Chile ===
Great Britain
3
Devonshire Park Lawn Tennis Club, Eastbourne, England
11–13 June 1959
Grass

Chile
2

			1	2	3	4	5
1	(United Kingdom) (Chile)	Bobby Wilson; Luis Ayala	6; 1	6; 3	5; 7	6; 2
2	(United Kingdom) (Chile)	Mike Davies; Patricio Rodríguez	6; 3	6; 4	6; 2
3	(United Kingdom) (Chile)	Mike Davies / Bobby Wilson; Ernesto Aguirre / Luis Ayala	6; 8	6; 3	4; 6	12; 10	3; 6
4	(United Kingdom) (Chile)	Bobby Wilson; Patricio Rodríguez	8; 6	6; 3	6; 3
5	(United Kingdom) (Chile)	Mike Davies; Luis Ayala	7; 9	0; 6	2; 6

== Semifinals ==
=== Italy vs. France ===
Italy
4
Sanremo, Italy
10–12 July 1959
Clay

France
1

			1	2	3	4	5
1	(Italy) (France)	Nicola Pietrangeli; Robert Haillet	6; 4	6; 2	6; 1
2	(Italy) (France)	Orlando Sirola; Pierre Darmon	6; 1	6; 1	3; 6	8; 6
3	(Italy) (France)	Nicola Pietrangeli / Orlando Sirola; Pierre Darmon / Jean-Noël Grinda	6; 3	6; 2	7; 5
4	(Italy) (France)	Giuseppe Merlo; Gérard Pilet	1; 6	6; 4	3; 6	4; 6
5	(Italy) (France)	Nicola Pietrangeli; Pierre Darmon	3; 6	6; 4	9; 7	6; 1

=== Spain vs. Great Britain ===
Spain
3
Real Club de Tenis Barcelona, Barcelona, Spain
9–11 July 1959
Clay

Great Britain
2

			1	2	3	4	5
1	(Spain) (United Kingdom)	Andrés Gimeno; Mike Davies	9; 7	6; 3	2; 6	6; 2
2	(Spain) (United Kingdom)	Manuel Santana; Billy Knight	7; 9	1; 6	3; 6
3	(Spain) (United Kingdom)	Juan Manuel Couder / Andrés Gimeno; Mike Davies / Bobby Wilson	1; 6	6; 1	15; 13	4; 6	1; 6
4	(Spain) (United Kingdom)	Andrés Gimeno; Billy Knight	7; 5	3; 6	6; 3	7; 5
5	(Spain) (United Kingdom)	Manuel Santana; Mike Davies	6; 2	3; 6	4; 6	6; 0	6; 1

== Final ==
=== Italy vs. Spain ===
Italy
4
Milan Tennis Club, Milan, Italy
24–27 July 1959
Clay

Spain
1

			1	2	3	4	5
1	(Italy) (Spain)	Orlando Sirola; Juan Manuel Couder	2	8; 6	7; 6	2; 5	6; 6
2	(Italy) (Spain)	Nicola Pietrangeli; Andrés Gimeno	8; 6	6; 3	6; 3
3	(Italy) (Spain)	Nicola Pietrangeli / Orlando Sirola; Juan Manuel Couder / Andrés Gimeno	6; 4	8; 6	6; 4
4	(Italy) (Spain)	Sergio Tacchini; Andrés Gimeno	4; 6	1; 6	1; 6
5	(Italy) (Spain)	Nicola Pietrangeli; Juan Manuel Couder	6; 8	4; 6	6; 2	6; 0	6; 4
