= 1959 Davis Cup America Zone =

International tennis competition

The America Zone was one of the three regional zones of the 1959 Davis Cup.

7 teams entered the America Zone: 3 teams competed in the North & Central America Zone, while 4 teams competed in the South America Zone. The winner of each sub-zone would play against each other to determine who moved to the Inter-Zonal Zone to compete against the winners of the Eastern Zone and Europe Zone.

Australia defeated Canada in the North & Central America Zone final, and Cuba received a walkover in the South America Zone final after Argentina withdrew. In the Americas Inter-Zonal Final, Australia defeated Cuba and progressed to the Inter-Zonal Zone.

== North & Central America Zone ==
=== Draw ===
Semifinals; 18–20 July
Canada
bye
Mexico City, Mexico (clay)
Mexico | 1
Australia | 4

Final; 24–26 July
Montreal, Canada (grass)
Canada | 0
Australia | 5

=== Semifinals ===
==== Mexico vs. Australia ====
Mexico
1
Centro Deportivo Chapultepec, Mexico City, Mexico
18–20 July 1959
Clay

Australia
4

| | | | 1 | 2 | 3 | 4 | 5 |
|---|---|---|---|---|---|---|---|
| 1 | (Mexico) (Australia) | Antonio Palafox; Neale Fraser | 6; 8 | 0; 6 | 6; 2 | 6; 4 | 3; 6 |
| 2 | (Mexico) (Australia) | Mario Llamas; Rod Laver | 6; 4 | 6; 4 | 6; 3 |
| 3 | (Mexico) (Australia) | Mario Llamas / Antonio Palafox; Roy Emerson / Neale Fraser | 3; 6 | 2; 6 | 5; 7 |
| 4 | (Mexico) (Australia) | Antonio Palafox; Rod Laver | 3; 6 | 8; 6 | 6; 4 | 5; 7 | 3; 6 |
| 5 | (Mexico) (Australia) | Mario Llamas; Roy Emerson | 4; 6 | 2; 6 | 6; 4 | 6; 4 | 0; 6 |

=== Final ===
==== Canada vs. Australia ====
Canada
0
Mount Royal Tennis Club, Montreal, Canada
24–26 July 1959
Grass

Australia
5

| | | | 1 | 2 | 3 | 4 | 5 |
|---|---|---|---|---|---|---|---|
| 1 | (Canada) (Australia) | Don Fontana; Roy Emerson | 2; 6 | 2; 6 | 4; 6 |
| 2 | (Canada) (Australia) | Robert Bédard; Rod Laver | 6; 8 | 3; 6 | 4; 6 |
| 3 | (Canada) (Australia) | Robert Bédard / Don Fontana; Roy Emerson / Neale Fraser | 3; 6 | 3; 6 | 1; 6 |
| 4 | (Canada) (Australia) | Robert Bédard; Roy Emerson | 6; 4 | 4; 6 | 5; 7 | 4; 6 |
| 5 | (Canada) (Australia) | François Godbout; Rod Laver | 9; 7 | 4; 6 | 2; 6 | 1; 6 |

== South America Zone ==
=== Draw ===
Semifinals; 2–4 May
Bridgetown, Barbados
Caribbean/West Indies | 0
Cuba | 4
Argentina | w/o
Venezuela

Final
Cuba | w/o
Argentina

=== Semifinals ===
==== Caribbean/West Indies vs. Cuba ====
Caribbean/West Indies
0
Bridgetown, Barbados
2–4 May 1959
Grass

Cuba
4

| | | | 1 | 2 | 3 | 4 | 5 |
|---|---|---|---|---|---|---|---|---|
| 1 | (Cricket West Indies) (Cuba) | Ian McDonald; Reynaldo Garrido | 4; 6 | 5; 7 | 6; 3 | 3; 6 |
| 2 | (Cricket West Indies) (Cuba) | Peter Philips; Orlando Garrido | 1; 6 | 2; 6 | 7; 9 |
| 3 | (Cricket West Indies) (Cuba) | Alan Price / Peter Valdez; Orlando Garrido / Reynaldo Garrido | 2; 6 | 2; 6 | 6; 2 | 2; 6 |
| 4 | (Cricket West Indies) (Cuba) | Ian McDonald; Orlando Garrido | 6; 0 | 6; 4 | 3; 6 | 3; 6 | 2; 6 |
| 5 | (Cricket West Indies) (Cuba) | Peter Philips; Reynaldo Garrido | 6; 4 | 4; 6 | 7; 5 | 1; 3 | | not completed |

=== Final ===
==== Cuba vs. Argentina ====
Cuba defeated Argentina by walkover.

== Americas Inter-Zonal Final ==
=== Australia vs. Cuba ===
Australia
5
Mount Royal Tennis Club, Montreal, Canada
31 July–2 August 1959
Grass

Cuba
0

| | | | 1 | 2 | 3 | 4 | 5 |
|---|---|---|---|---|---|---|---|
| 1 | (Australia) (Cuba) | Roy Emerson; Reynaldo Garrido | 6; 0 | 6; 4 | 6; 4 |
| 2 | (Australia) (Cuba) | Neale Fraser; Orlando Garrido | 6; 1 | 7; 5 | 6; 3 |
| 3 | (Australia) (Cuba) | Roy Emerson / Rod Laver; Orlando Garrido / Reynaldo Garrido | 6; 4 | 6; 4 | 6; 4 |
| 4 | (Australia) (Cuba) | Bob Mark; Orlando Garrido | 6; 4 | 6; 4 | 6; 2 |
| 5 | (Australia) (Cuba) | Neale Fraser; Reynaldo Garrido | 6; 3 | 6; 2 | 6; 4 |
