= 1956 Davis Cup America Zone =

International tennis competition

The America Zone was one of the three regional zones of the 1956 Davis Cup.

5 teams entered the America Zone, with the winner going on to compete in the Inter-Zonal Zone against the winners of the Eastern Zone and Europe Zone. The United States defeated Mexico in the final and progressed to the Inter-Zonal Zone.

== Draw ==
Quarterfinals; 2–4 May
United States
bye
Port of Spain, Trinidad and Tobago (clay)
Canada	5
Caribbean/West Indies	0
bye
Mexico
bye
Brazil

Semifinals; 6–29 July
Victoria, Canada (grass)
United States	4
Canada	1
Mexico City, Mexico (clay)
Mexico	4
Brazil	1

Final; 3–5 August
Rye, NY, United States (grass)
United States	4
Mexico	1

== Quarterfinals ==
=== Caribbean/West Indies vs. Canada ===
Caribbean/West Indies
0
Port of Spain, Trinidad and Tobago
2–4 May 1956
Clay

Canada
5

			1	2	3	4	5
1	(Cricket West Indies) (Canada)	Peter Philips; Robert Bédard	1; 6	1; 6	4; 6
2	(Cricket West Indies) (Canada)	Ian McDonald; Don Fontana	5; 7	1; 6	6; 4	3; 6
3	(Cricket West Indies) (Canada)	Ralph Legall / Peter Waddell; Robert Bédard / Don Fontana	0; 6	1; 6	4; 6
4	(Cricket West Indies) (Canada)	Peter Philips; Henri Rochon	3; 6	2; 6	4; 6
5	(Cricket West Indies) (Canada)	Ian McDonald; Robert Bédard	0; 6	1; 6	0; 6

== Semifinals ==
=== Canada vs. United States ===
Canada
1
Victoria Lawn Tennis Club, Victoria, Canada
27–29 July 1956
Grass

United States
4

			1	2	3	4	5
1	(Canada) (United States)	Don Fontana; Ham Richardson	1; 6	2; 6	2; 6
2	(Canada) (United States)	Robert Bédard; Herbie Flam	6; 2	2; 6	1; 6	9; 11
3	(Canada) (United States)	Robert Bédard / Don Fontana; Ron Holmberg / Barry MacKay (tennis)	3; 6	6; 3	12; 10	4; 6	3; 6
4	(Canada) (United States)	Robert Bédard; Ham Richardson	4; 6	4; 6	11; 13
5	(Canada) (United States)	Paul Willey; Barry MacKay (tennis)	14; 16	6; 4	6; 3	8; 6

=== Mexico vs. Brazil ===
Mexico
4
Centro Deportivo Chapultepec, Mexico City, Mexico
6–8 July 1956
Clay

Brazil
1

			1	2	3	4	5
1	(Mexico) (Brazil)	Mario Llamas; José Agüero	3; 6	6; 2	6; 1	6; 1
2	(Mexico) (Brazil)	Gustavo Palafox; Armando Vieira	3; 6	1; 6	7; 5	6; 1	6; 4
3	(Mexico) (Brazil)	Mario Llamas / Gustavo Palafox; Eugenio Saller / Armando Vieira	6; 3	6; 3	9; 7
4	(Mexico) (Brazil)	Gustavo Palafox; José Agüero	6; 4	5; 7	4; 6	3; 6
5	(Mexico) (Brazil)	Antonio Palafox; Pedro Bueno Nete	6; 3	9; 7	6; 1

== Final ==
=== United States vs. Mexico ===
United States
4
Westchester Country Club, Rye, NY, United States
3–5 August 1956
Grass

Mexico
1

			1	2	3	4	5
1	(United States) (Mexico)	Vic Seixas; Mario Llamas	6; 4	6; 2	6; 4
2	(United States) (Mexico)	Ham Richardson; Francisco Contreras	6; 3	6; 4	6; 4
3	(United States) (Mexico)	Sam Giammalva / Barry MacKay (tennis); Francisco Contreras / Mario Llamas	13; 11	4; 6	6; 1	6; 8	3; 6
4	(United States) (Mexico)	Ham Richardson; Mario Llamas	6; 3	6; 3	6; 1
5	(United States) (Mexico)	Sam Giammalva; Esteban Reyes Jr.	6; 4	6; 1	6; 3
