= Hubert Eaton =

Hubert Eaton may refer to:

- Hubert L. Eaton (1881–1966), developer of Forest Lawn Memorial-Parks & Mortuaries
- Hubert A. Eaton (1916–1991), physician, civil-rights activist and tennis player
- Hubert Eaton (cricketer), Cambridge University Cricket Club player
