= William Quillian (tennis) =

American tennis player and coach

Bill Quillian
- Country (sports): United States
- Born: April 13, 1934 Seattle, Washington
- Died: July 12, 1973 (aged 39) Victoria, British Columbia, Canada
- Plays: Right-handed

Doubles

Grand Slam doubles results
- US Open: F (1955)

William Whitcomb "Bill" Quillian (April 13, 1934 – July 12, 1973) was an American tennis player and coach.

Quillian joined the University of Washington in Seattle as an undergrad in 1952. He played tennis throughout his time there, participating in the U.S. championships in 1952, 1953, 1954, 1955, 1956, 1957, and 1958. In 1958, he competed in Europe at the Wimbledon Championships and French Championships. Quillian played for the U.S. in the 1958 Davis Cup against Venezuela; at the quarterfinal of the Americas zone in Caracas in May, he won his doubles and singles match.

Quillian was a coach from 1965, until his death in 1973 at the age of 39 from leukemia. The outdoor tennis stadium at the University of Washington was renamed The Bill Quillian Stadium in his honor. He was inducted into the University of Washington Hall of Fame in 1985.

== Grand Slam finals ==
=== Doubles (1 runner-up) ===
Result	Year	Championship	Surface	Partner	Opponents	Score
Loss	1955	U.S. Championships	Grass	(United States) Gerald Moss	(Japan) Kosei Kamo (Japan) Atsushi Miyagi	3–6, 3–6, 6–3, 6–1, 4–6
