= Gerald Moss =

American tennis player

- Full name: Gerald H. Moss
- Country (sports): United States

Singles
- Career record: 158-102
- Career titles: 9

Grand Slam singles results
- Australian Open: 3R (1955)
- French Open: 2R (1957)
- US Open: 3R (1954, 1956, 1960)

Doubles

Grand Slam doubles results
- Australian Open: 1R (1954)
- Wimbledon: QF (1961)
- US Open: F (1955)

Mixed doubles

Grand Slam mixed doubles results
- Wimbledon: 3R (1956, 1962)

Gerald 'Jerry' H. Moss is a retired American tennis player.

== Career ==
Moss was the National Boys Under 18 Champion in 1951.

In 1955 Moss was runner-up at the U.S. National Championships men's doubles title at the Longwood Cricket Club in Boston with compatriot Bill Quillian after a five-set defeat to Japanese Kosei Kamo and Atsushi Miyagi. Hurricane Diane roared through New England in August 1955, flooding the tennis courts and delaying the tournament for a week. When the tournament resumed many of the leading players such as Ken Rosewall, Tony Trabert, Lew Hoad and Vic Seixas had already left which devalued the men's doubles draw.

In 1954 he reached the third round of the U.S. National Championships men's singles and was beaten by Australian legend Ken Rosewall. He equaled his best Grand Slam singles performance in 1956 and 1960.

In 1958 Moss won the Eastern Clay Court Championships defeating Sidney Schwartz in the final.

In 1992 Moss was inducted into the University of Miami Sports Hall of Fame.

== Grand Slam finals ==
=== Doubles (1 runner-up) ===
Result	Year	Championship	Surface	Partner	Opponents	Score
Loss	1955	U.S. Championships	Grass	(United States) Bill Quillian	(Japan) Kosei Kamo (Japan) Atsushi Miyagi	3–6, 3–6, 6–3, 6–1, 4–6
