= 1954 U.S. National Championships – Men's singles =

Men's singles
- 1954 U.S. National Championships

Final
- Champion: (United States) Vic Seixas
- Runner-up: (Australia) Rex Hartwig
- Score: 3–6, 6–2, 6–4, 6–4

Details
- Draw: 104
- Seeds: 20

Events
Singles	men	women
Doubles	men	women
- U.S. National Championships

Third-seeded Vic Seixas defeated Rex Hartwig 3–6, 6–2, 6–4, 6–4 in the final to win the men's singles tennis title at the 1954 U.S. National Championships.

== Seeds ==
The tournament used two lists of ten players for seeding the men's singles event; one for U.S. players and one for foreign players. Vic Seixas is the champion; others show the round in which they were eliminated.

U.S.

1. (United States) Tony Trabert (quarterfinals)
2. (United States) Vic Seixas (champion)
3. (United States) Ham Richardson (semifinals)
4. (United States) Arthur Larsen (quarterfinals)
5. (United States) Eddie Moylan (fourth round)
6. (United States) Straight Clark (third round)
7. (United States) Gardnar Mulloy (fourth round)
8. (United States) Tom Brown (quarterfinals)
9. (United States) Tut Bartzen (third round)
10. (United States) Bill Talbert (fourth round)

Foreign

1. (Australia) Lew Hoad (quarterfinals)
2. (Australia) Ken Rosewall (semifinals)
3. (Sweden) Sven Davidson (fourth round)
4. (Australia) Rex Hartwig (finalist)
5. (Sweden) Lennart Bergelin (third round)
6. (Australia) Neale Fraser (fourth round)
7. (South Africa) Owen Williams (fourth round)
8. (Japan) Kosei Kamo (third round)
9. (Canada) Lorne Main (third round)
10. (United Kingdom) Roger Becker (third round)

== Draw ==
=== Key ===
- Q = Qualifier
- WC = Wild card
- LL = Lucky loser
- r = Retired

=== Final eight ===
Quarterfinals
1	(United States) Tony Trabert	2	6	6	2
8	(Australia) Rex Hartwig	6	8	2	6
7	(United States) Arthur Larsen	7	6	6	3	4
4	(Australia) Ken Rosewall	9	4	4	6	6
3	(United States) Vic Seixas	6	6	6
15	(United States) Tom Brown	4	2	2
5	(United States) Ham Richardson	6	7	11	4	6
2	(Australia) Lew Hoad	4	5	13	6	3

Semifinals
8	(Australia) Rex Hartwig	6	6	6
4	(Australia) Ken Rosewall	4	3	4
3	(United States) Vic Seixas	6	12	8	6
5	(United States) Ham Richardson	3	14	6	2

Final
8	(Australia) Rex Hartwig	6	2	4	4
3	(United States) Vic Seixas	3	6	6	6

=== Earlier rounds ===
==== Section 1 ====
First round
(United States) Dell	6	7	2	5
(United States) Wood	3	5	6	5	r
16	(Japan) Kamo	7	7	6
(United States) Andrews	5	5	4

Second round
1	(United States) Trabert	6	6	6
(United States) Eaton	0	0	1
(United States) Kilgus	0	0	0
18	(Canada) Main	6	6	6
19	(United States) Talbert	2	6	3	6	6
(United States) Eisenberg	6	3	6	3	2
(United States) Dell	5	3	2
16	(Japan) Kamo	7	6	6

Third round
1	(United States) Trabert	11	8	6
18	(Canada) Main	9	6	2
19	(United States) Talbert	0	2	6	6	6
16	(Japan) Kamo	6	6	4	4	0

Fourth round
1	(United States) Trabert	7	6	6
19	(United States) Talbert	5	3	0

==== Section 2 ====
First round
13	(United States) Mulloy	6	6	6
(United States) Kerdasha	3	4	3
(United States) Kauder	3	6	0	8	6
(Japan) Kamo	6	3	6	6	4
(United States) Holmberg	6	6	10	3	6
(United States) Coss	2	1	12	6	2
(United States) Cranston	12	8	3	6	6
(United States) Ball	10	10	6	3	3
(United States) Hettleman	6	6	6
(United States) Hildebrand	0	2	1
(United States) Morris	11	6	3	6
(United States) De Witts	9	4	6	3
(United States) Harum	3	9	4	6	6
(United States) Barker	6	7	6	1	4
8	(Australia) Hartwig	6	6	6
(Canada) Bedard	3	0	4

Second round
13	(United States) Mulloy	6	6	6
(United States) Kauder	1	1	4
(United States) Holmberg	3	2	7
(United States) Cranston	6	6	9
(United States) Hettleman	2	3	2
(United States) Morris	6	6	6
(United States) Harum	1	1	4
8	(Australia) Hartwig	6	6	6

Third round
13	(United States) Mulloy	10	6	11
(United States) Cranston	8	3	9
(United States) Morris	1	4	2
8	(Australia) Hartwig	6	6	6

Fourth round
13	(United States) Mulloy	8	4	3	2
8	(Australia) Hartwig	6	6	6	6

==== Section 3 ====
First round
7	(United States) Larsen	6	6	7
(United States) Drobac	4	4	5
(Australia) Cooper	7	6	6
(United States) Dickson	5	0	3
(United States) Green	4	6	7	6
(United States) Schulze	6	3	5	2
(United States) Schnaars	7	7	3	6
(United States) Stern	5	5	6	4
(United States) Stewart	6	6	6
(United States) Wickel	3	4	2
(United States) Flam	6	6	6
(United States) Maccracken	3	3	2
(Chile) Balbiers	6	6	5	6
(United States) Freedman	2	3	7	4
10	(Sweden) Bergelin	6	6	6
(United States) Stern	1	0	0

Second round
7	(United States) Larsen	6	7	6
(Australia) Cooper	4	5	4
(United States) Green	6	6	4	6
(United States) Schnaars	1	2	6	1
(United States) Stewart	2	2	1
(United States) Flam	6	6	6
(Chile) Balbiers	5	4	4
10	(Sweden) Bergelin	7	6	6

Third round
7	(United States) Larsen	6	6	6
(United States) Green	2	0	0
(United States) Flam	6	6	6
10	(Sweden) Bergelin	2	3	4

Fourth round
7	(United States) Larsen	6	6	7
(United States) Flam	4	3	5

==== Section 4 ====
First round
9	(United States) Moylan	7	6	6
(United States) Thompson	5	2	4
(United States) Rogers	8	8	6
(United States) Schaffer	6	6	4
(United States) Shea	6	6	5	6
(Chile) Ayala	3	4	7	2
(United States) Franks	1	6	0	6	6
(Canada) Fontana	6	3	6	2	2
(Japan) Miyagi	6	6	6
(United States) Forbes	2	4	1
(United States) Moss	6	6	6
(Spain) Vijande	1	1	2
(United States) Henry	2	7	6	6
(United States) Harum	6	5	2	4
4	(Australia) Rosewall	6	6	6
(United States) Lee	1	1	0

Second round
9	(United States) Moylan	6	7	6
(United States) Rogers	1	5	4
(United States) Shea	6	6	6
(United States) Franks	4	0	2
(Japan) Miyagi	6	1	6	4	8
(United States) Moss	4	6	2	6	10
(United States) Henry	1	4	2
4	(Australia) Rosewall	6	6	6

Third round
9	(United States) Moylan	4	4	10	6	6
(United States) Shea	6	6	8	4	4
(United States) Moss	2	2	5
4	(Australia) Rosewall	6	6	7

Fourth round
9	(United States) Moylan	4	2	6	3
4	(Australia) Rosewall	6	6	1	6

==== Section 5 ====
First round
3	(United States) Seixas	6	6	6
(United States) Brent	1	0	1
(United States) Douglas	3	6	6	3	6
(Canada) Willey	6	2	1	6	2
(United States) Hagist	6	6	10
(United States) Davis	2	0	8
20	(United Kingdom) Becker	6	6	4	7
(United States) Dailey	2	2	6	5
17	(United States) Bartzen	6	7	6
(United States) Lesch	4	5	2
(United States) McNair	6	6	8
(United States) Krais	1	3	6
(United States) Quay	6	6	3	6	6
(United States) Gaines	8	3	6	3	2
12	(Australia) Fraser	6	7	6
(United States) MacKay	1	5	3

Second round
3	(United States) Seixas	6	6	6
(United States) Douglas	3	2	3
(United States) Hagist	1	4	4
20	(United Kingdom) Becker	6	6	6
17	(United States) Bartzen	6	6	6
(United States) McNair	0	1	1
(United States) Quay	1	3	6	3
12	(Australia) Fraser	6	6	3	6

Third round
3	(United States) Seixas	6	6	6
20	(United Kingdom) Becker	4	4	4
17	(United States) Bartzen	9	2	7	12
12	(Australia) Fraser	7	6	9	14

Fourth round
3	(United States) Seixas	4	7	7	6
12	(Australia) Fraser	6	5	5	2

==== Section 6 ====
First round
15	(United States) Brown	8	6	6
(United States) Perry	6	4	3
(United States) Kovaleski	7	6	7
(United States) Steele Jr.	5	3	5
(Australia) Emerson	6	6	6
(United States) Lurie	1	2	3
(United States) Sullivan	6	6	2	1	7
(United States) Neer	4	3	6	6	5
(United States) Sorlien	6	5	6	6
(United States) Sweeney	2	7	3	3
(United States) Quillian	7	6	7
(United States) Pagel	5	2	5
(United States) Tuero	6	6	5	7
(United States) Paton	3	3	7	5
6	(Sweden) Davidson	8	6	5	10
(United States) Rubinoff	6	2	7	8

Second round
15	(United States) Brown	4	6	8	4	6
(United States) Kovaleski	6	1	6	6	4
(Australia) Emerson	6	6	6
(United States) Sullivan	0	2	3
(United States) Sorlien	4	3	3
(United States) Quillian	6	6	6
(United States) Tuero	8	3	0	7
6	(Sweden) Davidson	6	6	6	9

Third round
15	(United States) Brown	6	6	6
(Australia) Emerson	1	2	4
(United States) Quillian	2	2	6	1
6	(Sweden) Davidson	6	6	3	6

Fourth round
15	(United States) Brown	6	2	6	8
6	(Sweden) Davidson	3	6	3	6

==== Section 7 ====
First round
5	(United States) Richardson	6	9	6
(Australia) Reid	1	7	3
(United States) Masterson	6	6	6
(United States) Steiner	2	4	3
(United States) Flye	7	3	5	8	6
(United States) Browne	5	6	7	6	4
(Canada) Rochon	3	6	6	6
(United States) Brown	6	2	2	2
(United States) Shields	9	6	6
(United States) Clothier	7	4	4
(United States) Slobin	1	6	6	6
(United States) Blatchford	6	2	4	4
(United States) Longshore	7	3	6	6
(United States) Geller	5	6	3	1
14	(South Africa) Williams	5	6	6	6
(United States) Giammalva	7	3	1	1

Second round
5	(United States) Richardson	6	6	6
(United States) Masterson	4	3	0
(United States) Flye	3	2	3
(Canada) Rochon	6	6	6
(United States) Shields	3	4	4
(United States) Slobin	6	6	6
(United States) Longshore	5	3	2
14	(South Africa) Williams	7	6	6

Third round
5	(United States) Richardson	6	6	7
(Canada) Rochon	3	3	5
(United States) Slobin	6	4	2
14	(South Africa) Williams	8	6	6

Fourth round
5	(United States) Richardson	6	6	12
14	(South Africa) Williams	1	2	10

==== Section 8 ====
First round
11	(United States) Clark	7	6	6	6
(United Kingdom) Barrett	9	2	1	4
(United States) Tully	6	6	6
(United States) Boys	3	4	1

Second round
11	(United States) Clark	6	6	6
(United States) Tully	2	4	2
(United States) Frost	6	6	6
(United States) Bunis	2	0	3
(Chile) Hammersley	2	6	6	6
(United States) Burrows	6	1	2	4
(United States) Schwartz	12	0	4	4
2	(Australia) Hoad	10	6	6	6

Third round
11	(United States) Clark	7	12	7	4	8
(United States) Frost	9	10	5	6	10
(Chile) Hammersley	0	1	6
2	(Australia) Hoad	6	6	8

Fourth round
(United States) Frost	3	0	4
2	(Australia) Hoad	6	6	6

Preceded by 1954 Wimbledon Championships – Men's singles	Grand Slam men's singles	Succeeded by 1955 Australian Championships – Men's singles
