= 1955 U.S. National Championships (tennis) =

- Date: 2–11 September
- Edition: 75th
- Category: Grand Slam (ILTF)
- Surface: Grass
- Location: Chestnut Hill, Massachusetts; Forest Hills, Queens, New York City; United States
- Venue: Longwood Cricket Club; West Side Tennis Club

Champions

Men's singles
- (United States) Tony Trabert

Women's singles
- (United States) Doris Hart

Men's doubles
- (Japan) Kosei Kamo / (Japan) Atsushi Miyagi

Women's doubles
- (United States) Louise Brough / (United States) Margaret Osborne duPont

Mixed doubles
- (United States) Doris Hart / (United States) Vic Seixas
- U.S. National Championships

The 1955 U.S. National Championships (now known as the US Open) was a tennis tournament that took place on the outdoor grass courts at the West Side Tennis Club, Forest Hills in New York City, New York. The tournament ran from 2 September until 11 September. It was the 75th staging of the U.S. National Championships, and the fourth Grand Slam tennis event of the year.

== Finals ==
=== Men's singles ===
(United States) Tony Trabert (USA) defeated (Australia) Ken Rosewall (AUS) 9–7, 6–3, 6–3

=== Women's singles ===
(United States) Doris Hart (USA) defeated (United Kingdom) Patricia Ward (GBR) 6–4, 6–2

=== Men's doubles ===
(Japan) Kosei Kamo (JPN) / (Japan) Atsushi Miyagi (JPN) defeated (United States) Gerald Moss (USA) / (United States) Bill Quillian (USA) 6–2, 6–3, 3–6, 1–6, 6–4

=== Women's doubles ===
(United States) Louise Brough (USA) / (United States) Margaret Osborne duPont (USA) defeated (United States) Shirley Fry (USA) / (United States) Doris Hart (USA) 6–3, 1–6, 6–3

=== Mixed doubles ===
(United States) Doris Hart (USA) / (United States) Vic Seixas (USA) defeated (United States) Shirley Fry (USA) / (United States) Gardnar Mulloy (USA) 7–5, 5–7, 6–2

Preceded by 1955 Wimbledon Championships	Grand Slams	Succeeded by 1956 Australian Championships
