= Hubert A. Eaton =

American physician, civil-rights activist, and tennis player

- Country (sports): United States
- Born: December 2, 1916
- Died: September 4, 1991 (aged 74)

Grand Slam singles results
- US Open: 1R (1954)

Hubert Arthur Eaton (1916–1991) was an American physician, civil rights activist, and tennis player in North Carolina.

The son of a Winston-Salem physician, Eaton attended Johnson C. Smith University on a tennis scholarship after winning the 1933 national junior championship of the American Tennis Association (ATA), the African-American counterpart to the United States Tennis Association. He would go on to win the ATA national doubles championship, and served as the coach and mentor of Althea Gibson, the first black Wimbledon champion. He also played in the 1954 U.S. Championships, losing his match to top seed Tony Trabert.

He attended the University of Michigan Medical School and then established a practice in Wilmington, North Carolina, where he was a distinguished physician and noted civil rights activist, fighting for access to recreational facilities, the desegregation of public schools, and, most notably, the fight for access to public hospital facilities for black physicians.

In 1956, Eaton was a plaintiff in a lawsuit against the James Walker Memorial Hospital, which, by policy, granted hospital privileges exclusively to white physicians. After he prevailed in court, Eaton remarked, "If you don't know what to do, go to court; that is the only way we know of in Wilmington, North Carolina." Eaton later worked to desegregate patient wards, stating that the black community "[did not] want a partially integrated hospital where everything will be integrated except patients".

In 1964, Eaton was charged with second-degree murder in the death of a patient. A trial was held, but the judge ordered a directed verdict of not guilty by reason of insufficient evidence before the jury began deliberations.
