= 1956 Davis Cup =

1956 edition of the Davis Cup

Details
- Duration: 22 March – 28 December 1956
- Edition: 45th
- Teams: 33

Champion
- Winning nation: Australia

The 1956 Davis Cup was the 45th edition of the Davis Cup, the most important tournament between national teams in men's tennis. 24 teams entered the Europe Zone, 5 teams entered the America Zone, and 3 teams entered the Eastern Zone.

The United States defeated Mexico in the America Zone final, India defeated Japan in the Eastern Zone final, and Italy defeated Sweden in the Europe Zone final. In the Inter-Zonal Zone, the United States defeated Italy in the semifinal, and then defeated India in the final. In the Challenge Round the United States were defeated by defending champions Australia. The final was played at Memorial Drive in Adelaide, Australia on 26–28 December.

== America Zone ==
=== Draw ===
Quarterfinals; 2–4 May
United States
bye
Port of Spain, Trinidad and Tobago (clay)
Canada	5
Caribbean/West Indies	0
bye
Mexico
bye
Brazil

Semifinals; 6–29 July
Victoria, Canada (grass)
United States	4
Canada	1
Mexico City, Mexico (clay)
Mexico	4
Brazil	1

Final; 3–5 August
Rye, NY, United States (grass)
United States	4
Mexico	1

=== Final ===
United States vs. Mexico

United States
4
Westchester Country Club, Rye, NY, United States
3–5 August 1956
Grass

Mexico
1

			1	2	3	4	5
1	(United States) (Mexico)	Vic Seixas; Mario Llamas	6; 4	6; 2	6; 4
2	(United States) (Mexico)	Ham Richardson; Francisco Contreras	6; 3	6; 4	6; 4
3	(United States) (Mexico)	Sam Giammalva / Barry MacKay (tennis); Francisco Contreras / Mario Llamas	13; 11	4; 6	6; 1	6; 8	3; 6
4	(United States) (Mexico)	Ham Richardson; Mario Llamas	6; 3	6; 3	6; 1
5	(United States) (Mexico)	Sam Giammalva; Esteban Reyes Jr.	6; 4	6; 1	6; 3

== Eastern Zone ==
=== Draw ===
Semifinals; 22–24 March
Japan
bye
Colombo, Ceylon (clay)
Ceylon	0
India	5

Final; 18–20 May
Tokyo, Japan
Japan	2
India	3

=== Final ===
Japan vs. India

Japan
2
Tokyo, Japan
18–20 May 1956

India
3

			1	2	3	4	5
1	(Japan) (India)	Atsushi Miyagi; Ramanathan Krishnan	3; 6	0; 6	3; 6
2	(Japan) (India)	Kosei Kamo; Naresh Kumar	6; 2	4; 6	2; 6	6; 4	6; 0
3	(Japan) (India)	Kosei Kamo / Atsushi Miyagi; Ramanathan Krishnan / Naresh Kumar	4; 6	3; 6	1; 6
4	(Japan) (India)	Atsushi Miyagi; Naresh Kumar	6; 4	6; 1	6; 1
5	(Japan) (India)	Kosei Kamo; Ramanathan Krishnan	8; 6	3; 6	4; 6	5; 7

== Europe Zone ==
=== Draw ===
First Round; 27 April–1 May
Italy
bye
Poland	3
Austria	2
Denmark
bye
Czechoslovakia	5
Pakistan	0
France
bye
Luxembourg	2
Switzerland	3
West Germany
bye
Ireland	4
Finland	1
Turkey	0
Netherlands	5
bye
Chile
Yugoslavia	4
Egypt	1
bye
Great Britain
Monaco	2
Spain	3
bye
Belgium
Norway	4
Israel	1
bye
Sweden

Second Round; 10–15 May
Warsaw, Poland
Italy	5
Poland	0
Prague, Czechoslovakia (clay)
Denmark	4
Czechoslovakia	1
Lausanne, Switzerland
France	5
Switzerland	0
Dublin, Ireland
West Germany	4
Ireland	1
Scheveningen, Netherlands (clay)
Netherlands	0
Chile	5
Belgrade, Yugoslavia (clay)
Yugoslavia	0
Great Britain	5
Barcelona, Spain (clay)
Spain	1
Belgium	4
Oslo, Norway (clay)
Norway	0
Sweden	5

Quarterfinals; 31 May-4 June
Bologna, Italy (clay)
Italy	4
Denmark	1
Duisburg, West Germany (clay)
France	4
West Germany	1
Bristol, England (grass)
Chile	2
Great Britain	3
Brussels, Belgium (clay)
Belgium	1
Sweden	4

Semifinals; 15–17 July
Paris, France (clay)
Italy	3
France	2
Solna, Sweden (clay)
Great Britain	1
Sweden	4

Final; 20–22 July
Båstad, Sweden (clay)
Italy	5
Sweden	0

=== Final ===
Sweden vs. Italy

Sweden
0
Båstad Tennis Stadium, Båstad, Sweden
20–22 July 1956
Clay

Italy
5

			1	2	3	4	5
1	(Sweden) (Italy)	Sven Davidson; Nicola Pietrangeli	4; 6	6; 3	1; 6	4; 6
2	(Sweden) (Italy)	Ulf Schmidt; Giuseppe Merlo	7; 5	2; 6	5; 7	1; 6
3	(Sweden) (Italy)	Sven Davidson / Torsten Johansson; Nicola Pietrangeli / Orlando Sirola	4; 6	7; 5	2; 6	3; 6
4	(Sweden) (Italy)	Torsten Johansson; Orlando Sirola	4; 6	6; 1	2; 6	1; 6
5	(Sweden) (Italy)	Ulf Schmidt; Nicola Pietrangeli	5; 7	3; 6	6; 1	3; 6

== Inter-Zonal Zone ==
=== Draw ===
Semifinals; 29 September–1 October
EAS	India
bye
Forest Hills, NY, United States (grass)
EUR	Italy	1
AME	United States	4

Final; 14–16 December
Perth, Australia (grass)
EAS	India	1
AME	United States	4

=== Semifinals ===
United States vs. Italy

United States
4
West Side Tennis Club, Forest Hills, NY, United States
29 September–1 October 1956
Grass

Italy
1

			1	2	3	4	5
1	(United States) (Italy)	Ham Richardson; Nicola Pietrangeli	6; 3	6; 2	6; 3
2	(United States) (Italy)	Vic Seixas; Orlando Sirola	6; 3	11; 9	6; 4
3	(United States) (Italy)	Ham Richardson / Vic Seixas; Nicola Pietrangeli / Orlando Sirola	1; 6	6; 3	6; 4	6; 2
4	(United States) (Italy)	Michael Green; Nicola Pietrangeli	6; 3	4; 6	3; 6	4; 6
5	(United States) (Italy)	Sam Giammalva; Orlando Sirola	12; 10	6; 3	6; 2

United States vs. India

United States
4
Royal King's Park, Perth, Australia
14–16 December 1956
Grass

India
1

			1	2	3	4	5
1	(United States) (India)	Herbie Flam; Ramanathan Krishnan	7; 5	4; 6	10; 8	2; 6	6; 4
2	(United States) (India)	Vic Seixas; Naresh Kumar	6; 4	6; 1	6; 2
3	(United States) (India)	Sam Giammalva / Vic Seixas; Ramanathan Krishnan / Naresh Kumar	6; 2	3; 6	6; 4	6; 4
4	(United States) (India)	Michael Green; Ramanathan Krishnan	5; 7	4; 6	4; 6
5	(United States) (India)	Sam Giammalva; Naresh Kumar	6; 3	6; 4	6; 2

== Challenge Round ==
Australia vs. United States

Australia
5
Memorial Drive, Adelaide, Australia
26–28 December 1956
Grass

United States
0

			1	2	3	4	5
1	(Australia) (United States)	Lew Hoad; Herbie Flam	6; 2	6; 3	6; 3
2	(Australia) (United States)	Ken Rosewall; Vic Seixas	6; 1	6; 4	4; 6	6; 1
3	(Australia) (United States)	Lew Hoad / Ken Rosewall; Sam Giammalva / Vic Seixas	1; 6	6; 1	7; 5	6; 4
4	(Australia) (United States)	Ken Rosewall; Sam Giammalva	4; 6	6; 1	8; 6	7; 5
5	(Australia) (United States)	Lew Hoad; Vic Seixas	6; 2	7; 5	6; 3
