= Hans van Dalsum =

Dutch tennis player (1929–2010)

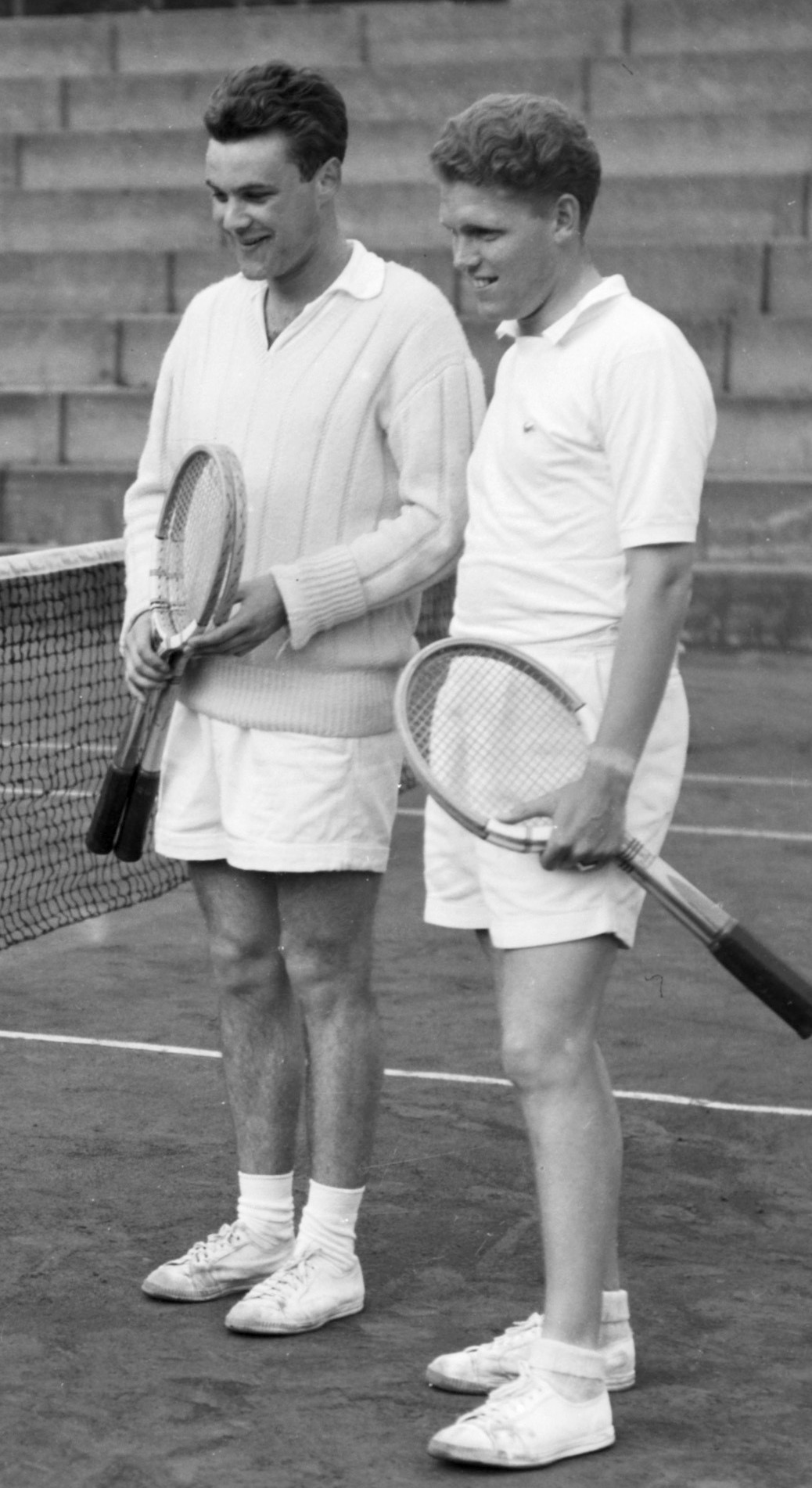
Hans van Dalsum (left) and Fred Dehnert in 1953

Johannes "Hans" van Dalsum (12 December 1929 – 15 April 2010) was a Dutch tennis player.

Van Dalsum made his debut at Wimbledon in 1953, losing in the first round to René Buser in four sets. In 1955, he defeated Khawaja Saeed in the first round in straight sets, but lost in the second round to Ian Froman in five sets, after leading 2–0 in sets. In 1956, he lost to Graham Regan in four sets, and in his last Wimbledon appearance in 1957 he lost in the first round to Tony Pickard in straight sets.

Van Dalsum was a four-time Dutch national champion in singles (1954, 1955, 1957, 1960) and five-time champion in doubles (four titles with Fred Dehnert and one with Piet van Eysden).

He played in seven ties for the Netherlands in the Davis Cup between 1955 and 1960 and compiled a record of six wins and nine losses.
