= 1955 Davis Cup =

1955 edition of the Davis Cup

Details
- Duration: 28 March – 28 August 1955
- Edition: 44th
- Teams: 34

Champion
- Winning nation: Australia

The 1955 Davis Cup was the 44th edition of the Davis Cup, the most important tournament between national teams in men's tennis. 24 teams entered the Europe Zone, 7 teams entered the America Zone, and 3 teams entered the newly reinstated Eastern Zone. Burma competed for the first time.

Australia defeated Canada in the America Zone final, Italy defeated Sweden in the Europe Zone final, and Japan defeated the Philippines in the Eastern Zone final. In the Inter-Zonal Zone, Australia defeated Japan in the semifinal, and then defeated Italy in the final. In the Challenge Round Australia defeated the defending champions the United States. The final was played at the West Side Tennis Club in Forest Hills, New York, United States on 26–28 August.

== America Zone ==
=== Draw ===
Quarterfinals; 15–17 July
Canada
bye
Caribbean/West Indies	w/o
Pakistan
Havana, Cuba
Cuba	1
Brazil	4
Chicago, IL, United States (clay)
Mexico	0
Australia	5

Semifinals; 22–24 July
Montreal, Canada (grass)
Canada	5
Caribbean/West Indies	0
Louisville, KY, United States (grass)
Brazil	1
Australia	4

Final; 29–31 July
Montreal, Canada (grass)
Canada	0
Australia	5

=== Final ===
Canada vs. Australia

Canada
0
Mount Royal Tennis Club, Montreal, Canada
29–31 July 1955
Grass

Australia
5

			1	2	3	4	5
1	(Canada) (Australia)	Robert Bedard; Ken Rosewall	0; 6	1; 6	6; 4	2; 6
2	(Canada) (Australia)	Lorne Main; Rex Hartwig	3; 6	3; 6	3; 6
3	(Canada) (Australia)	Robert Bedard / Don Fontana; Rex Hartwig / Lew Hoad	3; 6	6; 3	3; 6	4; 6
4	(Canada) (Australia)	Don Fontana; Lew Hoad	7; 9	5; 7	1; 6
5	(Canada) (Australia)	Henri Rochon; Ken Rosewall	1; 6	2; 6	1; 6

== Eastern Zone ==
=== Draw ===
Semifinals; 28–30 March
Japan
bye
Rangoon, Burma
Burma	0
Philippines	5

Final; 27–29 May
Tokyo, Japan
Japan	3
Philippines	2

=== Final ===
Japan vs. Philippines

Japan
3
Tokyo, Japan
27–29 May 1955

Philippines
2

			1	2	3	4	5
1	(Japan) (Philippines)	Kosei Kamo; Raymundo Deyro	6; 4	6; 8	6; 1	2; 6	7; 5
2	(Japan) (Philippines)	Atsushi Miyagi; Felicisimo Ampon	3; 6	6; 4	1; 6	6; 0	6; 3
3	(Japan) (Philippines)	Kosei Kamo / Atsushi Miyagi; Felicisimo Ampon / Raymundo Deyro	3; 6	3; 6	2; 6
4	(Japan) (Philippines)	Kosei Kamo; Felicisimo Ampon	1; 6	6; 4	6; 2	6; 0
5	(Japan) (Philippines)	Atsushi Miyagi; Raymundo Deyro	2; 6	3; 6	4; 6

== Europe Zone ==
=== Draw ===
First round
Norway	1
South Africa	4
West Germany	4
Ireland	1
Austria	5
Finland	0
Turkey	1
Egypt	4
Monaco	0
Argentina	3
Switzerland	3
Netherlands	2
Yugoslavia	0
Chile	5
Portugal	0
Czechoslovakia	5

Second round
Copenhagen, Denmark (clay)
Denmark	3
South Africa	2
Munich, West Germany
Italy	5
West Germany	0
Vienna, Austria (clay)
Great Britain	4
Austria	1
Cairo, Egypt
India	5
Egypt	0
Paris, France (clay)
Argentina	2
France	3
Montreux, Switzerland (clay)
Switzerland	0
Sweden	5
Budapest, Hungary
Chile	3
Hungary	2
Prague, Czechoslovakia
Czechoslovakia	0
Belgium	5

Quarterfinals
Copenhagen, Denmark (clay)
Denmark	0
Italy	5
Manchester, England (grass)
Great Britain	3
India	2
Saltsjöbaden, Sweden (clay)
France	2
Sweden	3
Brussels, Belgium
Chile	3
Belgium	2

Semifinals
Birmingham, England (grass)
Italy	5
Great Britain	0
Båstad, Sweden (clay)
Sweden	3
Chile	2

Final
Milan, Italy (clay)
Italy	4
Sweden	1

=== Final ===
Italy vs. Sweden

Italy
4
Milan, Italy
29–31 July 1955
Clay

Sweden
1

			1	2	3	4	5
1	(Italy) (Sweden)	Fausto Gardini; Sven Davidson	6; 4	0; 6	3; 6	6; 1	6; 3
2	(Italy) (Sweden)	Giuseppe Merlo; Lennart Bergelin	6; 1	6; 8	6; 8	8; 6	6; 1
3	(Italy) (Sweden)	Nicola Pietrangeli / Orlando Sirola; Sven Davidson / Torsten Johansson	6; 3	6; 4	2; 6	2; 6	6; 1
4	(Italy) (Sweden)	Orlando Sirola; Sven Davidson	2; 6	6; 8	4; 6
5	(Italy) (Sweden)	Fausto Gardini; Staffan Stockenberg	6; 4	6; 1	6; 4

== Inter-Zonal Zone ==
=== Draw ===
Semifinals; 5–7 August
EUR	Italy
bye
Glen Cove, NY, United States (grass)
EAS	Japan	0
AME	Australia	4

Final; 14–16 August
Philadelphia, PA, United States (grass)
EUR	Italy	0
AME	Australia	5

=== Semifinals ===
Australia vs. Japan

Australia
4
Glen Cove Tennis Club, Glen Cove, NY, United States
5–7 August 1955
Grass

Japan
0

			1	2	3	4	5
1	(Australia) (Japan)	Ken Rosewall; Atsushi Miyagi	6; 4	6; 4	6; 1
2	(Australia) (Japan)	Rex Hartwig; Kosei Kamo	8; 6	6; 8	6; 3	5; 7	6; 3
3	(Australia) (Japan)	Rex Hartwig / Lew Hoad; Kosei Kamo / Atsushi Miyagi	6; 3	6; 3	6; 3
4	(Australia) (Japan)	Rex Hartwig; Atsushi Miyagi	3; 6	6; 0	6; 3	9; 7
5	(Australia) (Japan)	Ken Rosewall; Kosei Kamo	3; 1					not completed

=== Final ===
Australia vs. Italy

Australia
5
Germantown Cricket Club, Philadelphia, PA, United States
14–16 August 1955
Grass

Italy
0

			1	2	3	4	5
1	(Australia) (Italy)	Lew Hoad; Fausto Gardini	6; 3	6; 2	6; 0
2	(Australia) (Italy)	Ken Rosewall; Nicola Pietrangeli	8; 6	3; 6	6; 1	6; 4
3	(Australia) (Italy)	Rex Hartwig / Lew Hoad; Nicola Pietrangeli / Orlando Sirola	7; 5	13; 11	7; 5
4	(Australia) (Italy)	Ken Rosewall; Orlando Sirola	6; 4	4; 6	6; 1	6; 4
5	(Australia) (Italy)	Lew Hoad; Nicola Pietrangeli	9; 7	6; 2	6; 3

== Challenge Round ==
United States vs. Australia

United States
0
West Side Tennis Club, Forest Hills, NY, United States
26–28 August 1955
Grass

Australia
5

			1	2	3	4	5
1	(United States) (Australia)	Vic Seixas; Ken Rosewall	3; 6	8; 10	6; 4	2; 6
2	(United States) (Australia)	Tony Trabert; Lew Hoad	6; 4	3; 6	3; 6	6; 8
3	(United States) (Australia)	Vic Seixas / Tony Trabert; Rex Hartwig / Lew Hoad	14; 12	4; 6	3; 6	6; 3	5; 7
4	(United States) (Australia)	Vic Seixas; Lew Hoad	9; 7	1; 6	4; 6	4; 6
5	(United States) (Australia)	Ham Richardson; Ken Rosewall	4; 6	6; 3	1; 6	4; 6
