= 1959 Davis Cup =

1959 edition of the Davis Cup

Details
- Duration: 21 March – 31 August 1959
- Edition: 48th
- Teams: 39

Champion
- Winning nation: Australia

The 1959 Davis Cup was the 48th edition of the Davis Cup, the most important tournament between national teams in men's tennis. 27 teams entered the Europe Zone, 8 teams entered the Eastern Zone, and 7 teams entered the America Zone. The Europe Zone was modified so that only the previous year's semifinalists were guaranteed first round byes, allowing more countries to compete. Colombia made its first appearance in the tournament.

Australia defeated Cuba in the Americas Inter-Zonal final, India defeated the Philippines in the Eastern Zone final, and Italy defeated Spain in the Europe Zone final. In the Inter-Zonal Zone, Australia defeated Italy in the semifinal, and then defeated India in the final. In the Challenge Round Australia defeated the defending champions the United States. The final was played at the West Side Tennis Club in Forest Hills, New York, United States on 28–31 August.

== America Zone ==
=== North & Central America Zone ===
Semifinals; 18–20 July
Canada
bye
Mexico City, Mexico (clay)
Mexico	1
Australia	4

Final; 24–26 July
Montreal, Canada (grass)
Canada	0
Australia	5

=== South America Zone ===
Semifinals; 2–4 May
Bridgetown, Barbados
Caribbean/West Indies	0
Cuba	4
Argentina	w/o
Venezuela

Final
Cuba	w/o
Argentina

=== Americas Inter-Zonal Final ===
Australia vs. Cuba

Australia
5
Mount Royal Tennis Club, Montreal, Canada
31 July–2 August 1959
Grass

Cuba
0

			1	2	3	4	5
1	(Australia) (Cuba)	Roy Emerson; Reynaldo Garrido	6; 0	6; 4	6; 4
2	(Australia) (Cuba)	Neale Fraser; Orlando Garrido	6; 1	7; 5	6; 3
3	(Australia) (Cuba)	Roy Emerson / Rod Laver; Orlando Garrido / Reynaldo Garrido	6; 4	6; 4	6; 4
4	(Australia) (Cuba)	Bob Mark; Orlando Garrido	6; 4	6; 4	6; 2
5	(Australia) (Cuba)	Neale Fraser; Reynaldo Garrido	6; 3	6; 2	6; 4

== Eastern Zone ==
=== Draw ===
Quarterfinals; 21 March–12 April
Tokyo, Japan
Ceylon	0
Japan	5
India	w/o
South Korea
Iran
Thailand	w/o
Manila, Philippines
Malaya	0
Philippines	5

Semifinals; 25 April–3 May
Tokyo, Japan
Japan	2
India	3
Bangkok, Thailand
Thailand	0
Philippines	5

Final; 1 June
Calcutta, India
India	4
Philippines	1

=== Final ===
India vs. Philippines

India
4
Calcutta, India
1 June 1959

Philippines
1

			1	2	3	4	5
1	(India) (Philippines)	Naresh Kumar; Raymundo Deyro	6; 2	6; 2	6; 3
2	(India) (Philippines)	Ramanathan Krishnan; Felicisimo Ampon	6; 2	6; 2	6; 3
3	(India) (Philippines)	Ramanathan Krishnan / Naresh Kumar; Raymundo Deyro / Juan-Johnson José	6; 3	8; 6	6; 2
4	(India) (Philippines)	Ramanathan Krishnan; Juan-Johnson José	6; 1	6; 4	6; 1
5	(India) (Philippines)	Premjit Lall; Felicisimo Ampon	6; 8	1; 6	6; 4	6; 2	1; 6

== Europe Zone ==
=== Draw ===
First Round; 17 April–4 May
Italy
bye
Belgium	4
Netherlands	1
Lebanon	1
Colombia	4
Norway	0
South Africa	5
Egypt	2
Romania	3
Ireland	0
New Zealand	5
Yugoslavia	1
Denmark	4
bye
France
Poland
bye
West Germany	0
Brazil	4
Finland	0
Spain	5
Israel	2
Switzerland	3
Sweden	5
Hungary	0
Austria	1
Chile	3
bye
Luxembourg
bye
Great Britain

Second Round; 1–18 May
Brussels, Belgium
Italy	4
Belgium	1
Bournemouth, England (clay)
Colombia	0
South Africa	5
Bucharest, Romania (clay)
Romania	3
New Zealand	2
Copenhagen, Denmark (clay)
Denmark	0
France	5
Warsaw, Poland
Poland	2
Brazil	3
Madrid, Spain (clay)
Spain	5
Switzerland	0
Stockholm, Sweden (clay)
Sweden	2
Chile	3
Mondorf-les-Bains, Luxembourg (clay)
Luxembourg	0
Great Britain	5

Quarterfinals; 11–15 June
Florence, Italy (clay)
Italy	4
South Africa	1
Paris, France (clay)
Romania	0
France	5
Barcelona, Spain (clay)
Brazil	2
Spain	3
Eastbourne, England (grass)
Chile	2
Great Britain	3

Semifinals; 9–12 July
Sanremo, Italy (clay)
Italy	4
France	1
Barcelona, Spain (clay)
Spain	3
Great Britain	2

Final; 24–27 July
Milan, Italy (clay)
Italy	4
Spain	1

=== Final ===
Italy vs. Spain

Italy
4
Milan Tennis Club, Milan, Italy
24–27 July 1959
Clay

Spain
1

			1	2	3	4	5
1	(Italy) (Spain)	Orlando Sirola; Juan Manuel Couder	2	8; 6	7; 6	2; 5	6; 6
2	(Italy) (Spain)	Nicola Pietrangeli; Andrés Gimeno	8; 6	6; 3	6; 3
3	(Italy) (Spain)	Nicola Pietrangeli / Orlando Sirola; Juan Manuel Couder / Andrés Gimeno	6; 4	8; 6	6; 4
4	(Italy) (Spain)	Sergio Tacchini; Andrés Gimeno	4; 6	1; 6	1; 6
5	(Italy) (Spain)	Nicola Pietrangeli; Juan Manuel Couder	6; 8	4; 6	6; 2	6; 0	6; 4

== Inter-Zonal Zone ==
=== Draw ===
Semifinals; 7–10 August
EAS	India
bye
Philadelphia, PA, United States (grass)
AME	Australia	4
EUR	Italy	1

Final; 14–16 August
Boston, MA, United States (grass)
EAS	India	1
AME	Australia	4

=== Semifinals ===
Australia vs. Italy

Australia
4
Germantown Cricket Club, Philadelphia, PA, United States
7–10 August 1959
Grass

Italy
1

			1	2	3	4	5
1	(Australia) (Italy)	Rod Laver; Nicola Pietrangeli	6; 4	2; 6	6; 3	6; 3
2	(Australia) (Italy)	Neale Fraser; Orlando Sirola	19; 17	1; 6	6; 3	6; 4
3	(Australia) (Italy)	Roy Emerson / Neale Fraser; Nicola Pietrangeli / Orlando Sirola	3; 6	11; 9	6; 3	9; 7
4	(Australia) (Italy)	Rod Laver; Orlando Sirola	4; 6	6; 4	6; 0	6; 3
5	(Australia) (Italy)	Roy Emerson; Nicola Pietrangeli	4; 6	0; 6	4; 6

=== Final ===
Australia vs. India

Australia
4
Longwood Cricket Club, Boston, MA, United States
14–16 August 1959
Grass

India
1

			1	2	3	4	5
1	(Australia) (India)	Rod Laver; Ramanathan Krishnan	1; 6	4; 6	10; 8	4; 6
2	(Australia) (India)	Neale Fraser; Premjit Lall	10; 8	6; 4	6; 1
3	(Australia) (India)	Roy Emerson / Neale Fraser; Ramanathan Krishnan / Premjit Lall	6; 3	7; 5	6; 2
4	(Australia) (India)	Neale Fraser; Ramanathan Krishnan	6; 2	6; 3	6; 4
5	(Australia) (India)	Rod Laver; Premjit Lall	6; 2	10; 8	6; 4

== Challenge Round ==
United States vs. Australia

United States
2
West Side Tennis Club, Forest Hills, NY, United States
28–31 August 1959
Grass

Australia
3

			1	2	3	4	5
1	(United States) (Australia)	Alex Olmedo; Neale Fraser	6; 8	8; 6	4; 6	6; 8
2	(United States) (Australia)	Barry MacKay; Rod Laver	7; 5	6; 4	6; 1
3	(United States) (Australia)	Butch Buchholz / Alex Olmedo; Roy Emerson / Neale Fraser	5; 7	5; 7	4; 6
4	(United States) (Australia)	Alex Olmedo; Rod Laver	9; 7	4; 6	10; 8	12; 10
5	(United States) (Australia)	Barry MacKay; Neale Fraser	6; 8	6; 3	2; 6	4; 6
