= Ibrahim Badreldin-Sayed =

Egyptian tennis player (born 1927)

Ibrahim Badr El-Din Sayed
Sport
- Country: Egypt
- Sport: Tennis

Ibrahim Badr El-Din Sayed (arإبراهيم بدر الدين السيد) (born 18 September 1927) is an Egyptian tennis player who represented Egypt in 17 matches in the Davis Cup between 1955 and 1962.
