= Fred Dehnert =

Dutch tennis player (1928–1983)

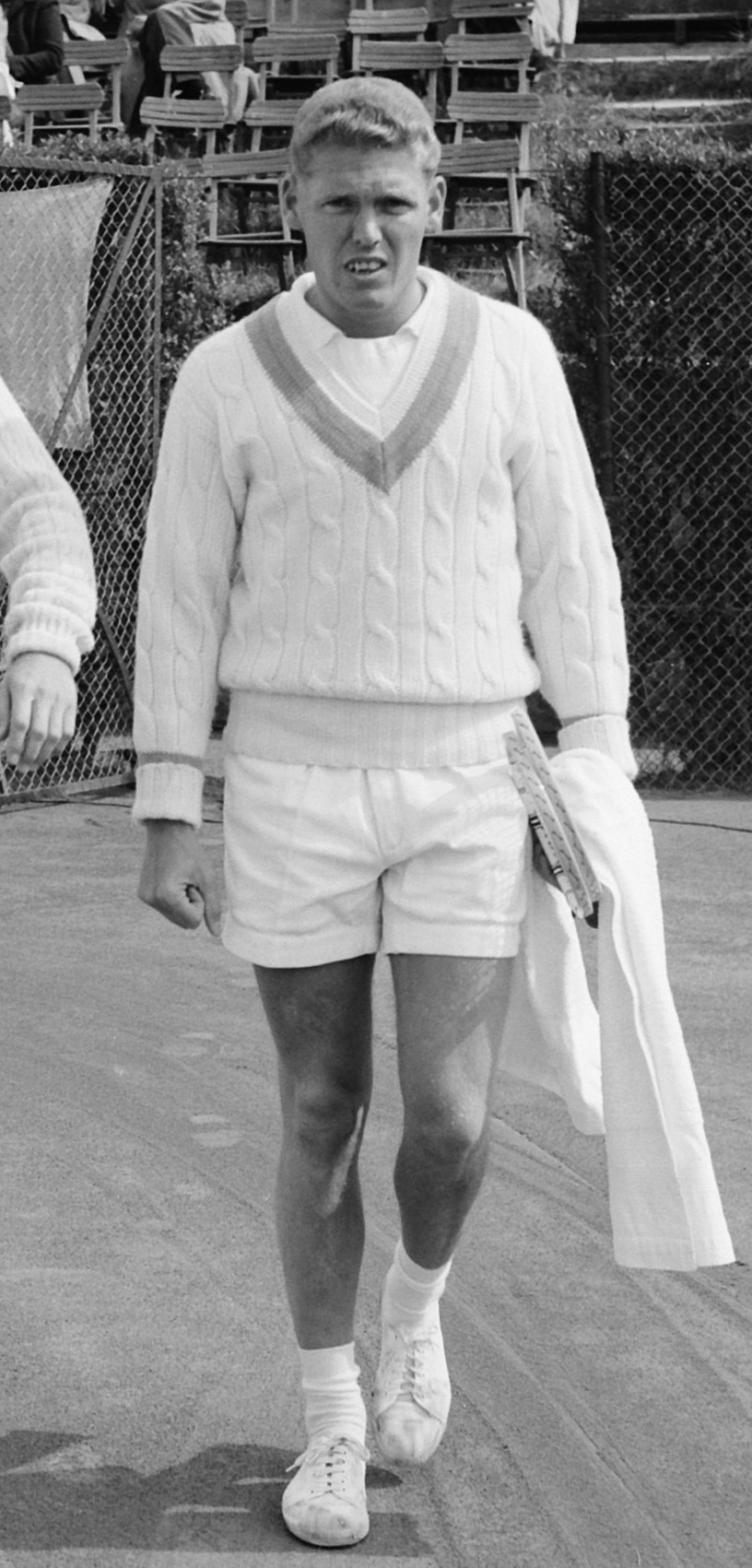
- Full name: Alfred Dehnert
- Country (sports): Netherlands
- Born: 12 May 1928 Rotterdam, Netherlands
- Died: 18 August 1983 (aged 55)

Singles

Grand Slam singles results
- Wimbledon: 2R (1953)

Alfred E. "Fred" Dehnert (12 May 1928 – 18 August 1983) was a Dutch tennis player. He competed at Wimbledon in 1951–1957, only once advancing through the singles first round.
