= Reynaldo Garrido =

Cuban tennis player (1934–2024)

- Born: 4 August 1934; Cuba
- Died: 27 March 2024 (aged 89); Miami, Florida, U.S.
- Spouse: Maria Garrido
- Children: 2
- Relatives: Orlando H. Garrido (brother)
- Tennis career
- Country (sports): Cuba

Reynaldo Garrido (4 August 1934 – 27 March 2024) was a tennis player and jai alai player from Havana, Cuba. He was the national champion tennis player in Cuba and won the Canadian Open in 1959, defeating his brother Orlando H. Garrido in the final of the tournament. After moving to the United States in 1965, he became a tennis instructor at the Palm Bay Club in Miami, and played professionally at Miami Jai-Alai.

== Early life and education ==
Born in Cuba, Garrido attended the University of Miami on a tennis scholarship from 1952 to 1955.

== Tennis career ==
Garrido was the reigning Cuban national champion in tennis from 1952 to 1959, and played for 9 years on the Cuba Davis Cup team.

His best Grand Slam performance was reaching the third round of the 1956 U.S. National Championships.

In Cuba under Fidel Castro, Garrido continued playing and teaching tennis, until finally obtaining an exit visa in 1965.

== Jai alai career ==
Garrido also played jai alai in Cuba and in Miami in the 1960s at the same time that he was the tennis professional at Miami's Jockey Club.

== Personal life and death ==
Garrido lived in Miami with his wife, Maria Garrido. They had two sons. He died in Miami on March 27, 2024, at the age of 89.
