= Kosei Kamo =

Japanese tennis player (1932–2017)

- Country (sports): Japan
- Born: May 10, 1932; Tokyo, Japan
- Died: January 6, 2017 (aged 84); Tokyo, Japan
- Plays: Right-handed

Singles

Grand Slam singles results
- Wimbledon: 3R (1957)
- US Open: 3R (1954)

Doubles

Grand Slam doubles results
- US Open: W (1955)

Kosei Kamo (加茂 公成, Kamo Kosei; May 10, 1932 – January 6, 2017) was a Japanese tennis player.

== Career ==
In 1955 he won the U.S. National Championships men's doubles title at the Longwood Cricket Club in Boston with compatriot Atsushi Miyagi after a five-set victory over Americans Gerald Moss and Bill Quillian. Hurricane Diane roared through New England in August 1955, flooding the tennis courts and delaying the tournament for a week. When the tournament resumed many of the leading players such as Ken Rosewall, Tony Trabert, Lew Hoad and Vic Seixas had already left which devalued the men's doubles draw.

In 1954 he reached the final of the Canadian National Championships but lost in straight sets to Bernard Bartzen.

Kamo won the Japanese tennis championships in 1953 and 1956.

From 1953 to 1959 he played in the Japanese Davis Cup team. He died after a heart attack on January 6, 2017.

== Grand Slam finals ==
=== Doubles (1 title) ===
| Result | Year | Championship | Surface | Partner | Opponents | Score |
|---|---|---|---|---|---|---|
| Win | 1955 | U.S. Championships | Grass | (Japan) Atsushi Miyagi | (United States) Gerald Moss (United States) Bill Quillian | 6–3, 6–3, 3–6, 1–6, 6–4 |
