= Atsushi Miyagi =

Japanese tennis player (1931–2021)

- Country (sports): Japan
- Born: 19 October 1931; Tokyo, Japan
- Died: 24 February 2021 (aged 89)
- Plays: Right-handed

Singles

Grand Slam singles results
- US Open: 2R (1954, 1955)

Doubles

Grand Slam doubles results
- US Open: W (1955)

Atsushi Miyagi (宮城淳, Miyagi Atsushi; 19 October 1931 – 24 February 2021) was a Japanese tennis player.

== Career ==
In 1955 Miyagi won the U.S. National Championships men's doubles title at the Longwood Cricket Club in Boston with compatriot Kosei Kamo after a five-set victory over Americans Gerald Moss and Bill Quillian. Hurricane Diane roared through New England in August 1955, flooding the tennis courts and delaying the tournament for a week. When the tournament resumed many of the leading players such as Ken Rosewall, Tony Trabert, Lew Hoad, and Vic Seixas had already left which reduced the quality of the competitors remaining in the men's doubles draw.

Miyagi won the Japanese tennis championships in 1954, 1955, 1957, and 1960.

Between 1952 and 1963 he played 16 times for the Japanese Davis Cup team.

At the 1962 Asian Games in Jakarta, Indonesia he won a gold medal in the men's doubles competition with Michio Fujii and a silver medal in the men's singles competition.

== Grand Slam finals ==
=== Doubles (1 title) ===
Result	Year	Championship	Surface	Partner	Opponents	Score
Win	1955	U.S. Championships	Grass	(Japan) Kosei Kamo	(United States) Gerald Moss (United States) Bill Quillian	6–3, 6–3, 3–6, 1–6, 6–4
