= 1956 in tennis =

This page covers all the important events in the sport of tennis in 1956. It provides the results of notable tournaments throughout the year on both the men's and women's ILTF tennis circuits.

== Australian Open ==
Category	Champion(s)	Finalist(s)	Score
Men's singles	(Australia) Lew Hoad	(Australia) Ken Rosewall	6–4, 3–6, 6–4, 7–5
Women's singles	(Australia) Mary Carter	(Australia) Thelma Coyne Long	3–6, 6–2, 9–7
Men's doubles	(Australia) Lew Hoad (Australia) Ken Rosewall	(Australia) Don Candy (Australia) Mervyn Rose	10–8, 13–11, 6–4
Women's doubles	(Australia) Mary Bevis Hawton (Australia) Thelma Coyne Long	(Australia) Mary Carter (Australia) Beryl Penrose	6–2, 5–7, 9–7
Mixed doubles	(Australia) Beryl Penrose (Australia) Neale Fraser	(Australia) Mary Bevis Hawton (Australia) Roy Emerson	6–2, 6–4

== French Open ==
Category	Champion(s)	Finalist(s)	Score
Men's singles	(Australia) Lew Hoad	(Sweden) Sven Davidson	6–4, 8–6, 6–3
Women's singles	(United States) Althea Gibson	(United Kingdom) Angela Mortimer	6–0, 12–10
Men's doubles	(Australia) Don Candy (United States) Robert Perry	(Australia) Ashley Cooper (Australia) Lew Hoad	7–5, 6–3, 6–3
Women's doubles	(United Kingdom) Angela Buxton (United States) Althea Gibson	(United States) Darlene Hard (United States) Dorothy Head Knode	6–8, 8–6, 6–1
Mixed doubles	(Australia) Thelma Coyne Long (Chile) Luis Ayala	(United States) Darlene Hard (Australia) Bob Howe	4–6, 6–4, 6–1

== Wimbledon ==
Category	Champion(s)	Finalist(s)	Score
Men's singles	(Australia) Lew Hoad	(Australia) Ken Rosewall	6–2, 4–6, 7–5, 6–4
Women's singles	(United States) Shirley Fry	(United Kingdom) Angela Buxton	6–3, 6–1
Men's doubles	(Australia) Lew Hoad (Australia) Ken Rosewall	(Italy) Nicola Pietrangeli (Italy) Orlando Sirola	7–5, 6–2, 6–1
Women's doubles	(United Kingdom) Angela Buxton (United States) Althea Gibson	(Australia) Fay Muller (Australia) Daphne Seeney	6–1, 8–6
Mixed doubles	(United States) Vic Seixas (United States) Shirley Fry	(United States) Gardnar Mulloy (United States) Althea Gibson	2–6, 6–2, 7–5

== US Open ==
Category	Champion(s)	Finalist(s)	Score
Men's singles	(Australia) Ken Rosewall	(Australia) Lew Hoad	4–6, 6–2, 6–3, 6–3
Women's singles	(United States) Shirley Fry	(United States) Althea Gibson	6–3, 6–4
Men's doubles	(Australia) Lew Hoad (Australia) Ken Rosewall	(United States) Ham Richardson (United States) Vic Seixas	6–2, 6–2, 3–6, 6–4
Women's doubles	(United States) Louise Brough (United States) Margaret Osborne	(United States) Shirley Fry (United States) Betty Pratt	6–3, 6–0
Mixed doubles	(United States) Margaret Osborne (Australia) Ken Rosewall	(United States) Darlene Hard (Australia) Lew Hoad	9–7, 6–1
