= 1958 in tennis =

This page covers all the important events in the sport of tennis in 1958. It provides the results of notable tournaments throughout the year on both the men's and women's ILTF tennis circuits.

== Australian Open ==
Category	Champion(s)	Finalist(s)	Score
Men's singles	(Australia) Ashley Cooper	(Australia) Malcolm Anderson	7–5, 6–3, 6–4
Women's singles	(United Kingdom) Angela Mortimer	(Australia) Lorraine Coghlan	6–3, 6–4
Men's doubles	(Australia) Ashley Cooper (Australia) Neale Fraser	(Australia) Roy Emerson (Australia) Robert Mark	7–5, 6–8, 3–6, 6–3, 7–5
Women's doubles	(Australia) Mary Bevis Hawton (Australia) Thelma Coyne Long	(Australia) Lorraine Coghlan (United Kingdom) Angela Mortimer	7–5, 6–8, 6–2
Mixed doubles	(Australia) Mary Bevis Hawton (Australia) Bob Howe	(United Kingdom) Angela Mortimer (Australia) Peter Newman	9–11, 6–1, 6–2

== French Open ==
Category	Champion(s)	Finalist(s)	Score
Men's singles	(Australia) Mervyn Rose	(Chile) Luis Ayala	6–3, 6–4, 6–4
Women's singles	(Hungary) Zsuzsa Körmöczy	(United Kingdom) Shirley Bloomer	6–4, 1–6, 6–2
Men's doubles	(Australia) Ashley Cooper (Australia) Neale Fraser	(Australia) Bob Howe (South Africa) Abe Segal	3–6, 8–6, 6–3, 7–5
Women's doubles	(Mexico) Rosie Reyes (Mexico) Yola Ramírez	(Australia) Mary Bevis Hawton (Australia) Thelma Coyne Long	6–4, 7–5
Mixed doubles	(United Kingdom) Shirley Bloomer (Italy) Nicola Pietrangeli	(Australia) Lorraine Coghlan (Australia) Bob Howe	8–6, 6–2

== Wimbledon ==
Category	Champion(s)	Finalist(s)	Score
Men's singles	(Australia) Ashley Cooper	(Australia) Neale Fraser	3–6, 6–3, 6–4, 13–11
Women's singles	(United States) Althea Gibson	(United Kingdom) Angela Mortimer	8–6, 6–2
Men's doubles	(Sweden) Sven Davidson (Sweden) Ulf Schmidt	(Australia) Ashley Cooper (Australia) Neale Fraser	6–4, 6–4, 8–6
Women's doubles	(Brazil) Maria Bueno (United States) Althea Gibson	(United States) Margaret duPont (United States) Margaret Varner	6–3, 7–5
Mixed doubles	(Australia) Robert Howe (Australia) Lorraine Coghlan	(Denmark) Kurt Nielsen (United States) Althea Gibson	6–3, 13–11

== US Open ==
Category	Champion(s)	Finalist(s)	Score
Men's singles	(Australia) Ashley Cooper	(Australia) Malcolm Anderson	6–2, 3–6, 4–6, 10–8, 8–6
Women's singles	(United States) Althea Gibson	(United States) Darlene Hard	3–6, 6–1, 6–2
Men's doubles	(United States) Alex Olmedo (United States) Ham Richardson	(United States) Sam Giammalva (United States) Barry MacKay (tennis)	3–6, 6–3, 6–4, 6–4
Women's doubles	(United States) Jeanne Arth (United States) Darlene Hard	(United States) Althea Gibson (Brazil) Maria Bueno	2–6, 6–3, 6–4
Mixed doubles	(United States) Margaret Osborne (Australia) Neale Fraser	(Brazil) Maria Bueno (United States) Alex Olmedo	6–4, 3–6, 9–7
