= 1957 Davis Cup Europe Zone =

International tennis competition

Details
- Duration: 19 April 1957 – 5 August 1957
- Teams: 24
- Categories: 1957 Davis Cup America Zone; 1957 Davis Cup Eastern Zone; 1957 Davis Cup Europe Zone

Champion
- Winning nation: Belgium; Qualified for: 1957 Davis Cup; Inter-Zonal Finals

The Europe Zone was one of the three regional zones of the 1957 Davis Cup.

24 teams entered the Europe Zone, with the winner going on to compete in the Inter-Zonal Zone against the winners of the America Zone and Eastern Zone. Belgium defeated Italy in the final and progressed to the Inter-Zonal Zone.

== Draw ==
First Round; 19–29 April
Sweden
bye
Romania	0
Austria	5
Denmark
bye
Spain	0
South Africa	5
Chile
bye
Luxembourg	0
Poland	5
Italy
bye
Netherlands	4
Norway	1
Hungary	w/o
Ireland
bye
Belgium
Yugoslavia	0
Mexico	5
bye
West Germany
Lebanon	0
New Zealand	5
bye
Great Britain
Switzerland	1
Czechoslovakia	4
bye
France

Second Round; 10–20 May
Vienna, Austria (clay)
Sweden	4
Austria	1
Copenhagen, Denmark (clay)
Denmark	4
South Africa	1
Warsaw, Poland
Chile	2
Poland	3
Scheveningen, Netherlands (clay)
Italy	5
Netherlands	0
Brussels, Belgium
Hungary	1
Belgium	4
Cologne, West Germany
Mexico	3
West Germany	1
Eastbourne, England (grass)
New Zealand	0
Great Britain	5
Lyon, France (clay)
Czechoslovakia	0
France	4

Quarterfinals; 7–10 June
Stockholm, Sweden (clay)
Sweden	4
Denmark	1
Palermo, Italy (clay)
Poland	1
Italy	4
Brussels, Belgium (clay)
Belgium	3
Mexico	2
Paris, France (clay)
Great Britain	3
France	2

Semifinals; 19–22 July
Milan, Italy (clay)
Sweden	1
Italy	3
Brussels, Belgium (clay)
Belgium	3
Great Britain	2

Final; 2–5 August
Brussels, Belgium
Italy	2
Belgium	3

== First round ==
=== Romania vs. Austria ===
Romania
0
Bucharest, Romania
27–29 April 1957
Clay

Austria
5

			1	2	3	4	5
1	(Romania) (Austria)	Cornel Zacopceanu; Franz Saiko	1; 6	3; 6	1; 6
2	(Romania) (Austria)	Gheorghe Viziru; Alfred Huber	1; 6	3; 6	6; 4	4; 6
3	(Romania) (Austria)	Gheorghe Viziru / Marian Viziru; Alfred Huber / Franz Saiko	1; 6	4; 6	10; 12
4	(Romania) (Austria)	Gheorghe Viziru; Franz Saiko	7; 5	6; 2	6; 8	2; 6	3; 6
5	(Romania) (Austria)	Cornel Zacopceanu; Alfred Huber	3; 6	2; 6	4; 6

=== Spain vs. South Africa ===
Spain
0
Real Club de Tenis Barcelona, Barcelona, Spain
26–28 April 1957
Clay

South Africa
5

			1	2	3	4	5
1	(Spain) (South Africa)	Juan Manuel Couder; Gordon Forbes	5; 7	6; 4	5; 7	6; 4	3; 6
2	(Spain) (South Africa)	Emilio Martínez del Rey; Trevor Fancutt	3; 6	6; 3	2; 6	9; 11
3	(Spain) (South Africa)	Juan Manuel Couder / Fernando Olózaga; Gordon Forbes / Abe Segal	4; 6	6; 4	3; 6	6; 1	3; 6
4	(Spain) (South Africa)	Emilio Martínez del Rey; Abe Segal	2; 6	12; 10	6; 0	4; 6	3; 6
5	(Spain) (South Africa)	Juan Manuel Couder; Trevor Fancutt	5; 7	4; 6	6; 1	6; 2	2; 6

=== Luxembourg vs. Poland ===
Luxembourg
0
Mondorf-les-Bains, Luxembourg
27–29 April 1957

Poland
5

			1	2	3	4	5
1	(Luxembourg) (Poland)	Louis Wagner; Władysław Skonecki	2; 6	1; 6	1; 6
2	(Luxembourg) (Poland)	Géza Wertheim; Andrzej Licis	0; 6	0; 6	0; 6
3	(Luxembourg) (Poland)	Gaston Wampach / Géza Wertheim; Józef Piątek / Władysław Skonecki	2; 6	4; 6	4; 6
4	(Luxembourg) (Poland)	Louis Wagner; Andrzej Licis	6; 3	1; 6	1; 6	6; 8
5	(Luxembourg) (Poland)	Géza Wertheim; Władysław Skonecki	0; 6	4; 6	3; 6

=== Netherlands vs. Norway ===
Netherlands
4
Scheveningen, Netherlands
26–28 April 1957
Clay

Norway
1

			1	2	3	4	5
1	(Netherlands) (Norway)	Hans van Dalsum; Gunnar Høst Sjøwall	6; 2	4; 6	6; 2	4; 6	6; 3
2	(Netherlands) (Norway)	Fred Dehnert; Finn Søhol	1; 6	6; 2	3; 6	7; 5	6; 1
3	(Netherlands) (Norway)	Hans van Dalsum / Fred Dehnert; Finn-Dag Jagge / Gunnar Høst Sjøwall	10; 8	6; 2	7; 5
4	(Netherlands) (Norway)	Hendrik Goris; Finn Søhol	3; 6	4; 6	4; 6
5	(Netherlands) (Norway)	Fred Dehnert; Finn-Dag Jagge	6; 3	6; 2	6; 0

=== Yugoslavia vs. Mexico ===
Yugoslavia
0
Belgrade, Yugoslavia
26–28 April 1957

Mexico
5

			1	2	3	4	5
1	(Socialist Federal Republic of Yugoslavia) (Mexico)	Ilija Panajotović; Mario Llamas	2; 6	4; 6	4; 6
2	(Socialist Federal Republic of Yugoslavia) (Mexico)	Ivko Plećević; Francisco Contreras	5; 7	2; 6	2; 6
3	(Socialist Federal Republic of Yugoslavia) (Mexico)	Sima Nikolić / Aleksandar Popović; Francisco Contreras / Mario Llamas	0; 6	3; 6	3; 6
4	(Socialist Federal Republic of Yugoslavia) (Mexico)	Ivko Plećević; Mario Llamas	3; 6	4; 6	3; 6
5	(Socialist Federal Republic of Yugoslavia) (Mexico)	Ilija Panajotović; Antonio Palafox	1; 6	4; 6	5; 7

=== Lebanon vs. New Zealand ===
Lebanon
0
Alumni Club, Beirut, Lebanon
19–21 April 1957
Clay

New Zealand
5

			1	2	3	4	5
1	(Lebanon) (New Zealand)	Nadin Hajjar; Jeff Robson	0; 6	0; 6	1; 6
2	(Lebanon) (New Zealand)	Samir El Khoury; Corbett Parker	6; 4	10; 12	1; 6	2; 6
3	(Lebanon) (New Zealand)	Elie Attieh / Samir El Khoury; Corbett Parker / Jeff Robson	6; 4	9; 11	3; 6	3; 6
4	(Lebanon) (New Zealand)	Samir El Khoury; Jeff Robson	3; 6	2; 6	2; 6
5	(Lebanon) (New Zealand)	Roy Karaoglan; Lew Gerrard	1; 6	0; 6	2; 6

=== Switzerland vs. Czechoslovakia ===
Switzerland
1
Lugano, Switzerland
26–28 April 1957

Czechoslovakia
4

			1	2	3	4	5
1	(Switzerland) (Czechoslovakia)	Paul Blondel; Jiří Javorský	0; 6	4; 6	4; 6
2	(Switzerland) (Czechoslovakia)	Martin Froesch; Jiří Parma	6; 2	6; 4	6; 8	4; 6	6; 1
3	(Switzerland) (Czechoslovakia)	Paul Blondel / René Buser; Jiří Javorský / Ján Krajčík	4; 6	2; 6	3; 6
4	(Switzerland) (Czechoslovakia)	Martin Froesch; Jiří Javorský	1; 6	4; 6	1; 6
5	(Switzerland) (Czechoslovakia)	Paul Blondel; Jiří Parma	2; 6	6; 4	0; 6	4; 6

== Second round ==
=== Austria vs. Sweden ===
Austria
1
Vienna, Austria
10–12 May 1957
Clay

Sweden
4

			1	2	3	4	5
1	(Austria) (Sweden)	Alfred Huber; Sven Davidson	2; 6	0; 6	2; 6
2	(Austria) (Sweden)	Franz Saiko; Ulf Schmidt	6; 3	6; 3	2; 6	1; 6	2; 6
3	(Austria) (Sweden)	Alfred Huber / Franz Saiko; Sven Davidson / Ulf Schmidt	3; 6	2; 6	6; 3	3; 6
4	(Austria) (Sweden)	Alfred Huber; Ulf Schmidt	5; 7	4; 6	6; 2	6; 2	6; 2
5	(Austria) (Sweden)	Franz Hainka; Jan-Erik Lundqvist	2; 6	4; 6	7; 9

=== Denmark vs. South Africa ===
Denmark
4
Copenhagen, Denmark
17–19 May 1957
Clay

South Africa
1

			1	2	3	4	5
1	(Denmark) (South Africa)	Kurt Nielsen; Trevor Fancutt	2; 6	6; 8	6; 4	7; 5	6; 4
2	(Denmark) (South Africa)	Torben Ulrich; Gordon Forbes	3; 6	6; 3	6; 4	6; 2
3	(Denmark) (South Africa)	Kurt Nielsen / Torben Ulrich; Gordon Forbes / Abe Segal	11; 9	1; 6	6; 3	6; 8	1; 6
4	(Denmark) (South Africa)	Kurt Nielsen; Gordon Forbes	6; 4	6; 2	1; 6	6; 4
5	(Denmark) (South Africa)	Torben Ulrich; Trevor Fancutt	2; 6	5; 7	6; 4	6; 3	6; 3

=== Poland vs. Chile ===
Poland
3
Warsaw, Poland
17–19 May 1957

Chile
2

			1	2	3	4	5
1	(Poland) (Chile)	Władysław Skonecki; Luis Ayala	3; 6	9; 7	6; 4	8; 6
2	(Poland) (Chile)	Andrzej Licis; Andrés Hammersley	4; 6	6; 3	6; 2	6; 4
3	(Poland) (Chile)	Józef Piątek / Jan Radzio; Luis Ayala / Andrés Hammersley	2; 6	4; 6	3; 6
4	(Poland) (Chile)	Andrzej Licis; Luis Ayala	2; 6	2; 6	0; 6
5	(Poland) (Chile)	Władysław Skonecki; Andrés Hammersley	3; 6	7; 5	6; 1	6; 3

=== Netherlands vs. Italy ===
Netherlands
0
Scheveningen, Netherlands
18–20 May 1957
Clay

Italy
5

			1	2	3	4	5
1	(Netherlands) (Italy)	Fred Dehnert; Giuseppe Merlo	2; 6	1; 6	1; 6
2	(Netherlands) (Italy)	Hans van Dalsum; Nicola Pietrangeli	1; 6	1; 6	1; 6
3	(Netherlands) (Italy)	Hans van Dalsum / Fred Dehnert; Nicola Pietrangeli / Orlando Sirola	8; 6	2; 6	8; 10	3; 6
4	(Netherlands) (Italy)	Hans van Dalsum; Giuseppe Merlo	8; 6	2; 6	8; 10	3; 6
5	(Netherlands) (Italy)	Fred Dehnert; Orlando Sirola	4; 6	4; 6	7; 9

=== Belgium vs. Hungary ===
Belgium
4
Brussels, Belgium
17–19 May 1957

Hungary
1

			1	2	3	4	5
1	(Belgium) (Hungary)	Philippe Washer; József Asbóth	8; 6	6; 1	6; 4
2	(Belgium) (Hungary)	Jacques Brichant; András Ádám-Stolpa	6; 3	6; 2	6; 2
3	(Belgium) (Hungary)	Jacques Brichant / Gino Mezzi; András Ádám-Stolpa / József Asbóth	6; 0	6; 3	4; 6	4; 6	3; 6
4	(Belgium) (Hungary)	Philippe Washer; András Ádám-Stolpa	6; 1	4; 6	7; 5	2; 6	6; 2
5	(Belgium) (Hungary)	Jacques Brichant; József Asbóth	4; 6	6; 2	6; 1	6; 2

=== West Germany vs. Mexico ===
West Germany
1
Cologne, West Germany
17–19 May 1957

Mexico
3

			1	2	3	4	5
1	(West Germany) (Mexico)	Peter Scholl; Francisco Contreras	4; 6	1; 6	2; 6
2	(West Germany) (Mexico)	Rupert Huber; Mario Llamas	3; 6	5; 7	6; 4	4; 6
3	(West Germany) (Mexico)	Ernst Buchholz / Horst Hermann; Francisco Contreras / Mario Llamas	6; 8	3; 6	6; 4	4; 6
4	(West Germany) (Mexico)	Rupert Huber; Antonio Palafox	6; 2	10; 8	6; 1
5	(West Germany) (Mexico)	Peter Scholl; Esteban Reyes Jr.	6; 1	6; 0	4; 6	6; 8		not completed

=== Great Britain vs. New Zealand ===
Great Britain
5
Devonshire Park Lawn Tennis Club, Eastbourne, England
16–18 May 1957
Grass

New Zealand
0

			1	2	3	4	5
1	(United Kingdom) (New Zealand)	Bobby Wilson; Lew Gerrard	6; 2	11; 9	6; 2
2	(United Kingdom) (New Zealand)	Mike Davies; Jeff Robson	6; 8	6; 3	6; 2	6; 4
3	(United Kingdom) (New Zealand)	Mike Davies / Bobby Wilson; Lew Gerrard / Jeff Robson	6; 3	9; 7	6; 2
4	(United Kingdom) (New Zealand)	Bobby Wilson; Jeff Robson	4; 6	8; 6	6; 1	6; 2
5	(United Kingdom) (New Zealand)	Mike Davies; Corbett Parker	6; 1	6; 2	6; 4

=== France vs. Czechoslovakia ===
France
4
Stade Henri Cochet, Lyon, France
17–19 May 1957
Clay

Czechoslovakia
0

			1	2	3	4	5
1	(France) (Czechoslovakia)	Robert Haillet; Jiří Javorský	6; 8	7; 5	8; 6	6; 4
2	(France) (Czechoslovakia)	Pierre Darmon; Ján Krajčík	6; 0	6; 1	6; 2
3	(France) (Czechoslovakia)	Jean-Claude Molinari / Paul Rémy; Jiří Javorský / Ján Krajčík	9; 7	6; 3	6; 3
4	(France) (Czechoslovakia)	Robert Haillet; Ján Krajčík	6; 4	6; 2	6; 3
5	(France) (Czechoslovakia)	Pierre Darmon; Jiří Javorský	7; 9	1; 2				not completed

== Quarterfinals ==
=== Sweden vs. Denmark ===
Sweden
4
Johanneshovs Isstadion, Stockholm, Sweden
8–10 June 1957
Clay

Denmark
1

			1	2	3	4	5
1	(Sweden) (Denmark)	Sven Davidson; Torben Ulrich	6; 2	6; 2	6; 2
2	(Sweden) (Denmark)	Ulf Schmidt; Kurt Nielsen	4; 6	8; 6	1; 6	8; 6	9; 7
3	(Sweden) (Denmark)	Sven Davidson / Ulf Schmidt; Kurt Nielsen / Torben Ulrich	6; 4	6; 3	6; 4
4	(Sweden) (Denmark)	Sven Davidson; Kurt Nielsen	6; 3	4; 6	6; 4	3; 6	0; 6
5	(Sweden) (Denmark)	Jan-Erik Lundqvist; Torben Ulrich	7; 5	6; 1	4; 6	6; 4

=== Italy vs. Poland ===
Italy
4
Palermo, Italy
7–9 June 1957
Clay

Poland
1

			1	2	3	4	5
1	(Italy) (Poland)	Giuseppe Merlo; Andrzej Licis	6; 1	6; 4	6; 0
2	(Italy) (Poland)	Nicola Pietrangeli; Władysław Skonecki	7; 5	4; 6	7; 5	6; 1
3	(Italy) (Poland)	Nicola Pietrangeli / Orlando Sirola; Józef Piątek / Władysław Skonecki	6; 2	9; 7	6; 2
4	(Italy) (Poland)	Antonio Maggi; Władysław Skonecki	6; 4	6; 0	6; 4
5	(Italy) (Poland)	Orlando Sirola; Andrzej Licis	4; 6	7; 9	0; 6

=== Belgium vs. Mexico ===
Belgium
3
Royal Léopold Club, Brussels, Belgium
8–10 June 1957
Clay

Mexico
2

			1	2	3	4	5
1	(Belgium) (Mexico)	Philippe Washer; Francisco Contreras	7; 5	3; 6	6; 4	4; 6	3; 6
2	(Belgium) (Mexico)	Jacques Brichant; Mario Llamas	1; 6	6; 4	4; 6	6; 4	6; 1
3	(Belgium) (Mexico)	Jacques Brichant / Philippe Washer; Francisco Contreras / Mario Llamas	4; 6	4; 6	1; 6
4	(Belgium) (Mexico)	Jacques Brichant; Francisco Contreras	8; 6	6; 1	6; 3
5	(Belgium) (Mexico)	Philippe Washer; Mario Llamas	6; 4	6; 1	6; 3

=== France vs. Great Britain ===
France
2
Stade Roland Garros, Paris, France
8–10 June 1957
Clay

Great Britain
3

			1	2	3	4	5
1	(France) (United Kingdom)	Pierre Darmon; Mike Davies	7; 9	2; 6	7; 5	4; 6
2	(France) (United Kingdom)	Robert Haillet; Bobby Wilson	4; 6	3; 6	2; 6
3	(France) (United Kingdom)	Jean-Claude Molinari / Paul Rémy; Mike Davies / Bobby Wilson	3; 6	6; 3	6; 1	6; 3
4	(France) (United Kingdom)	Pierre Darmon; Bobby Wilson	1; 6	6; 4	6; 1	3; 6	7; 5
5	(France) (United Kingdom)	Robert Haillet; Mike Davies	8; 6	7; 5	4; 6	1; 6	4; 6

== Semifinals ==
=== Italy vs. Sweden ===
Italy
3
Milan Tennis Club, Milan, Italy
19–21 July 1957
Clay

Sweden
1

			1	2	3	4	5
1	(Italy) (Sweden)	Giuseppe Merlo; Ulf Schmidt	6; 0	6; 0	6; 3
2	(Italy) (Sweden)	Nicola Pietrangeli; Sven Davidson	6; 4	0; 6	1; 6	1; 6
3	(Italy) (Sweden)	Nicola Pietrangeli / Orlando Sirola; Sven Davidson / Ulf Schmidt	6; 4	6; 4	6; 4
4	(Italy) (Sweden)	Nicola Pietrangeli; Ulf Schmidt	7; 9	8; 6	6; 2	6; 2
5	(Italy) (Sweden)	Giuseppe Merlo; Sven Davidson						not played

=== Belgium vs. Great Britain ===
Belgium
3
Brussels, Belgium
20–22 July 1957
Clay

Great Britain
2

			1	2	3	4	5
1	(Belgium) (United Kingdom)	Philippe Washer; Mike Davies	7; 5	3; 6	6; 8	4; 6
2	(Belgium) (United Kingdom)	Jacques Brichant; Bobby Wilson	6; 0	7; 5	6; 4
3	(Belgium) (United Kingdom)	Jacques Brichant / Philippe Washer; Mike Davies / Bobby Wilson	3; 6	4; 6	6; 3	3; 6
4	(Belgium) (United Kingdom)	Philippe Washer; Bobby Wilson	3; 6	6; 4	6; 4	6; 0
5	(Belgium) (United Kingdom)	Jacques Brichant; Mike Davies	1; 6	4; 6	6; 3	6; 4	6; 2

== Final ==
=== Belgium vs. Italy ===
Belgium
3
Brussels, Belgium
2–5 August 1957

Italy
2

			1	2	3	4	5
1	(Belgium) (Italy)	Jacques Brichant; Nicola Pietrangeli	4; 6	4; 6	3; 6
2	(Belgium) (Italy)	Philippe Washer; Giuseppe Merlo	6; 2	8; 6	6; 2
3	(Belgium) (Italy)	Jacques Brichant / Philippe Washer; Nicola Pietrangeli / Orlando Sirola	3; 6	2; 6	5; 7
4	(Belgium) (Italy)	Jacques Brichant; Giuseppe Merlo	6; 8	7; 5	6; 8	7; 5	6; 1
5	(Belgium) (Italy)	Philippe Washer; Nicola Pietrangeli	6; 4	3; 6	6; 8	7; 5	6; 2
