= 1956 French Championships – Men's singles =

Men's singles
- 1956 French Championships

Final
- Champion: (Australia) Lew Hoad
- Runner-up: (Sweden) Sven Davidson
- Score: 6–4, 8–6, 6–3

Details
- Draw: 114
- Seeds: 16

Events
Singles	men	women
Doubles	men	women
- French Championships

First-seeded Lew Hoad defeated Sven Davidson 6–4, 8–6, 6–3 in the final to win the men's singles tennis title at the 1956 French Championships.

== Seeds ==
The seeded players are listed below. Lew Hoad is the champion; others show the round in which they were eliminated.

1. (Australia) Lew Hoad (champion)
2. (United States) Budge Patty (fourth round)
3. (Sweden) Sven Davidson (finalist)
4. (United States) Art Larsen (fourth round)
5. (Italy) Giuseppe Merlo (semifinals)
6. (Egypt) Jaroslav Drobný (fourth round)
7. (Australia) Ashley Cooper (semifinals)
8. (United States) Tut Bartzen (first round)
9. (Chile) Luis Ayala (fourth round)
10. (Denmark) Kurt Nielsen (fourth round)
11. (United States) Herbert Flam (quarterfinals)
12. (United States) Bob Perry (fourth round)
13. (France) Paul Rémy (quarterfinals)
14. (Australia) Don Candy (fourth round)
15. (Belgium) Jacques Brichant (quarterfinals)
16. (United Kingdom) Roger Becker (fourth round)

== Draw ==
=== Key ===
- Q = Qualifier
- WC = Wild card
- LL = Lucky loser
- r = Retired

=== Finals ===
Quarterfinals
15	(Belgium) Jacques Brichant	4	6	6	3
7	(Australia) Ashley Cooper	6	8	2	6
3	(Sweden) Sven Davidson	6	6	7
11	(United States) Herbert Flam	2	4	5
5	(Italy) Giuseppe Merlo	4	6	2	6	10
13	(France) Paul Rémy	6	2	6	4	8
(Italy) Nicola Pietrangeli	1	3	0
1	(Australia) Lew Hoad	6	6	6

Semifinals
7	(Australia) Ashley Cooper	2	7	7	3
3	(Sweden) Sven Davidson	6	9	5	6
5	(Italy) Giuseppe Merlo	4	5	4
1	(Australia) Lew Hoad	6	7	6

Final
3	(Sweden) Sven Davidson	4	6	3
1	(Australia) Lew Hoad	6	8	6

=== Earlier rounds ===
==== Section 1 ====
First round
(Dominican Republic) Morales	2	0	0
(Spain) Olozaga	6	6	6

Second round
(Spain) Olozaga	6	4	3	4
(Socialist Federal Republic of Yugoslavia) Plećević	3	6	6	6
(France) Follveider	2	1	1
15	(Belgium) Brichant	6	6	6
(Czechoslovakia) Javorský	6	6	6
(Tunisia) Belkhodja	2	2	2
(Germany) Huber
2	(United States) Patty

Third round
(Socialist Federal Republic of Yugoslavia) Plećević	2	0	4
15	(Belgium) Brichant	6	6	6
(Czechoslovakia) Javorský	3	2	3
2	(United States) Patty	6	6	6

Fourth round
15	(Belgium) Brichant	3	4	7	7	6
2	(United States) Patty	6	6	5	5	2

==== Section 2 ====
First round
(Hungary) Asbóth	6	6	6
(Italy) Fachini	4	3	1
(France) Weiss	7	1	6	4	2
(Lebanon) Hajjar	5	6	2	6	6
(France) Molinari	8	6	6
(Sweden) Johansson	6	4	2
(Australia) Laver	1	2	4
10	(Denmark) Nielsen	6	6	6
(United States) Macy	1	8	2
(Chile) Hammersley	6	10	6
(United Kingdom) Davies
(Cuba) Garrido
(Lebanon) El Khoury	8	2	4	4
(France) Desq	6	6	6	6
(United States) Van Voorhees	2	4	1
7	(Australia) Cooper	6	6	6

Second round
(Hungary) Asbóth	6	6	6
(Lebanon) Hajjar	1	1	0
(France) Molinari	5	4	5
10	(Denmark) Nielsen	7	6	7
(Chile) Hammersley	6	9	2	0	0
(United Kingdom) Davies	3	7	6	6	6
(France) Desq	5	7	2
7	(Australia) Cooper	7	9	6

Third round
(Hungary) Asbóth	7	1	4	6	4
10	(Denmark) Nielsen	5	6	6	0	6
(United Kingdom) Davies	2	4	1
7	(Australia) Cooper	6	6	6

Fourth round
10	(Denmark) Nielsen	3	3	4
7	(Australia) Cooper	6	6	6

==== Section 3 ====
First round
(France) Lartigue	1	2	1
(Germany) Feldbausch	6	6	6
(France) Lasry	6	6	6
(United States) Smith	2	1	0
(France) De Kermadec	5	6	6	2	6
(France) Mey	7	3	4	6	2
(France) Favieres	4	6	4	2
14	(Australia) Candy	6	3	6	6
(France) Laval	2	0	4
(France) Nys	6	6	6
(France) Darmon	6	6	6
(Colombia) Rueda	1	1	1
(Mexico) Reyes Jr	7	2	9	2
(Italy) Sirola	9	6	7	6
(United States) Powers	0	0	0
3	(Sweden) Davidson	6	6	6

Second round
(Germany) Feldbausch	3	6	6	1	6
(France) Lasry	6	3	0	6	2
(France) De Kermadec	4	0	2
14	(Australia) Candy	6	6	6
(France) Nys	6	2	2	6
(France) Darmon	4	6	6	8
(Italy) Sirola	3	4	5
3	(Sweden) Davidson	6	6	7

Third round
(Germany) Feldbausch	2	0	3
14	(Australia) Candy	6	6	6
(France) Darmon	8	5	2	6
3	(Sweden) Davidson	6	7	6	8

Fourth round
14	(Australia) Candy	3	7	6	4
3	(Sweden) Davidson	6	5	8	6

==== Section 4 ====
First round
(Spain) Gimeno	2	2	6	2
(South Africa) Fancutt	6	6	3	6
(Canada) Willey
(France) Pellizza
(Monaco) Pasquier	0	3	1
(United States) Vincent	6	6	6
(Socialist Federal Republic of Yugoslavia) Keretic	3	4	4
11	(United States) Flam	6	6	6
(Australia) O'Brien	4	1	10	1
(United Kingdom) Wilson	6	6	8	6
(Venezuela) Pimentel	7	6	2	0	6
(France) Jalabert	5	4	6	6	8
(Australia) Mark	6	6	13
(France) Rinderknech	2	3	11
(Australia) Howe	2	3	2
6	(Egypt) Drobný	6	6	6

Second round
(South Africa) Fancutt	13	4	6	6
(France) Pellizza	11	6	1	2
(United States) Vincent	2	2	1
11	(United States) Flam	6	6	6
(United Kingdom) Wilson	6	6	6	6
(France) Jalabert	2	2	3	1
(Australia) Mark	0	2	1
6	(Egypt) Drobný	6	6	6

Third round
(South Africa) Fancutt	2	1	0
11	(United States) Flam	6	6	6
(United Kingdom) Wilson	0	6	6
6	(Egypt) Drobný	6	8	8

Fourth round
11	(United States) Flam	7	6	8
6	(Egypt) Drobný	5	3	6

==== Section 5 ====
First round
5	(Italy) Merlo
(Switzerland) Sturdza
(United States) Dorfman	7	6	6	7
(France) De La Prade	9	4	1	5
(France) Haillet
(France) Pinart
(Pakistan) Ahmad	2	0	2
(South Africa) Vermaak	6	6	6
12	(United States) Perry	6	6	6
(France) Bergerat	2	0	1
(Uruguay) Argon	6	4	4	6	6
(France) Lesage	3	6	6	3	2
(United States) Brinkman	5	6	6	6	6
(France) Chatrier	7	8	4	1	1
(Belgium) Mezzi	6	6	6
(Socialist Federal Republic of Yugoslavia) Panajotovic	2	3	4

Second round
5	(Italy) Merlo	6	6	6
(United States) Dorfman	0	3	2
(France) Haillet	8	5	6	7
(South Africa) Vermaak	6	7	4	5
12	(United States) Perry	6	6	8
(Uruguay) Argon	3	4	6
(United States) Brinkman	0	2	6
(Belgium) Mezzi	6	6	8

Third round
5	(Italy) Merlo	6	6	6
(France) Haillet	4	2	4
12	(United States) Perry	3	6	6	6
(Belgium) Mezzi	6	1	1	2

Fourth round
5	(Italy) Merlo	6	6	6
12	(United States) Perry	2	3	3

==== Section 6 ====
First round
4	(United States) Larsen	6	10	6
(France) Dubuc	1	8	2
(Ecuador) Lerque	4	6	3	6	3
(Southern Rhodesia) Black	6	3	6	4	6
(France) Schaff	2	4	2
(Pakistan) Saeed Hai	6	6	6
(France) Deniau	6	6	6
(Australia) Hawton	3	3	2
13	(France) Rémy	7	6	6
(United Kingdom) Knight	5	0	3
(Italy) Bergamo	1	2	0
(United States) Fox	6	6	6
(United Kingdom) Barclay
(Monaco) Borghini
(France) Malosse	4	3	4
(Hungary) Ádám-Stolpa	6	6	6

Second round
4	(United States) Larsen	6	6	7
(Southern Rhodesia) Black	4	3	5
(Pakistan) Saeed Hai	6	2	4	6	1
(France) Deniau	4	6	6	2	6
13	(France) Rémy	6	6	5	6
(United States) Fox	2	1	7	1
(Monaco) Borghini	2	2	2
(Hungary) Ádám-Stolpa	6	6	6

Third round
4	(United States) Larsen	6	6	6
(France) Deniau	0	2	2
13	(France) Rémy	6	6	6
(Hungary) Ádám-Stolpa	4	1	2

Fourth round
4	(United States) Larsen	7	3	6	5	3
13	(France) Rémy	5	6	1	7	6

==== Section 7 ====
First round
8	(United States) Bartzen
(Germany) Scholl
(France) Lemasson	4	4	0
(South Africa) Forbes	6	6	6
(Italy) Pietrangeli	6	6	6
(Belgium) Devroe	1	1	2
(France) Deniau	1	3	6	6	6
(France) Becker	6	6	4	4	4
9	(Chile) Ayala	8	6	6
(France) Perreau-Saussine	6	3	0
(Socialist Federal Republic of Yugoslavia) Popovic
(United States) Slobin
(Sweden) Schmidt	6	6	6
(Spain) Martínez	2	1	2
(France) Grandet	6	6	6
(United States) Stern	2	3	1

Second round
(Germany) Scholl	2	3	6	6	3
(South Africa) Forbes	6	6	3	4	6
(Italy) Pietrangeli	6	6	6
(France) Deniau	2	0	1
9	(Chile) Ayala	6	6	6
(Socialist Federal Republic of Yugoslavia) Popovic	1	0	2
(Sweden) Schmidt	6	6	6
(France) Grandet	3	2	4

Third round
(South Africa) Forbes	6	9	3
(Italy) Pietrangeli	8	11	6
9	(Chile) Ayala	6	6	6
(Sweden) Schmidt	4	4	3

Fourth round
(Italy) Pietrangeli	6	6	0	5	6
9	(Chile) Ayala	4	1	6	7	4

==== Section 8 ====
First round
(France) Lemyze	4	7	6	6
(Egypt) Najar	6	5	2	2

Second round
1	(Australia) Hoad	6	6	7
(Hungary) Gulyás	4	2	5
(France) Abdesselam	6	6	6
(France) Chabance	1	1	2
16	(United Kingdom) Becker	9	6	6
(Denmark) Ulrich	7	1	1
(France) Bernard	10	7	6
(France) Lemyze	8	5	4

Third round
1	(Australia) Hoad	1	7	6	4	6
(France) Abdesselam	6	5	0	6	0
16	(United Kingdom) Becker	8	6	6
(France) Bernard	6	1	2

Fourth round
1	(Australia) Hoad	6	7	6	6
16	(United Kingdom) Becker	8	5	1	3

Preceded by 1956 Australian Championships – Men's singles	Grand Slam men's singles	Succeeded by 1956 Wimbledon Championships – Men's singles
