= 1957 Davis Cup America Zone =

International tennis competition

The America Zone was one of the three regional zones of the 1957 Davis Cup.

7 teams entered the America Zone, with the winner going on to compete in the Inter-Zonal Zone against the winners of the Eastern Zone and Europe Zone. The United States defeated Brazil in the final and progressed to the Inter-Zonal Zone.

== Draw ==
Quarterfinals; 27–29 April; 17–19 May; 19–21 July
Israel
bye
Montreal, Canada (grass)
Canada	2
Brazil	3
Caracas, Venezuela
Venezuela	3
Cuba	2
Port of Spain, Trinidad and Tobago (clay)
Caribbean/West Indies	0
United States	5

Semifinals; 24–26 May; 27–29 July
Montreal, Canada (grass)
Israel	0
Brazil	5
Caracas, Venezuela
Venezuela	1
United States	4

Final; 2–4 August
Boston, MA, United States (grass)
Brazil	0
United States	5

== Quarterfinals ==
=== Canada vs. Brazil ===
Canada
2
Mount Royal Tennis Club, Montreal, Canada
19–21 July 1957
Grass

Brazil
3

			1	2	3	4	5
1	(Canada) (Brazil)	Robert Bédard; Carlos Alberto Fernandes	7; 9	8; 6	3; 6	6; 3	5; 7
2	(Canada) (Brazil)	Don Fontana; Armando Vieira	4; 6	6; 2	6; 3	3; 6	6; 3
3	(Canada) (Brazil)	Don Fontana / Paul Willey; Carlos Alberto Fernandes / Armando Vieira	6; 8	2; 6	9; 7	4; 6
4	(Canada) (Brazil)	Don Fontana; Carlos Alberto Fernandes	2; 6	3; 6	8; 10
5	(Canada) (Brazil)	Paul Willey; José Agüero	6; 3	6; 3	4; 6	6; 3

=== Venezuela vs. Cuba ===
Venezuela
3
Caracas, Venezuela
27–29 April 1957

Cuba
2

			1	2	3	4	5
1	(Venezuela) (Cuba)	Ricardo López; Reynaldo Garrido	5; 7	6; 8	4; 6
2	(Venezuela) (Cuba)	Isaías Pimentel; Orlando Garrido	4; 6	6; 2	6; 4	6; 1
3	(Venezuela) (Cuba)	Ricardo López / Isaías Pimentel; Reynaldo Garrido / Raul Karman	7; 5	9; 7	6; 2
4	(Venezuela) (Cuba)	Isaías Pimentel; Reynaldo Garrido	6; 0	6; 3	6; 2
5	(Venezuela) (Cuba)	Wolfgang Ploch; Orlando Garrido	2; 6	2; 6	3; 6

=== Caribbean/West Indies vs. United States ===
Caribbean/West Indies
0
Tranquility Square Lawn Tennis Club, Port of Spain, Trinidad and Tobago
17–19 May 1957
Clay

United States
5

			1	2	3	4	5
1	(Cricket West Indies) (United States)	Peter Philips; Vic Seixas	0; 6	2; 6	0; 6
2	(Cricket West Indies) (United States)	Ian McDonald; Tut Bartzen	1; 6	0; 6	1; 6
3	(Cricket West Indies) (United States)	Ian McDonald / Peter Philips; Grant Golden / Vic Seixas	4; 6	0; 6	0; 6
4	(Cricket West Indies) (United States)	Ian McDonald; Grant Golden	6; 8	4; 6	6; 4	2; 6
5	(Cricket West Indies) (United States)	Peter Valdez; Tut Bartzen	1; 6	1; 6	1; 6

== Semifinals ==
=== Brazil vs. Israel ===
Brazil
5
Montreal, Canada
27–29 July 1957
Grass

Israel
0

			1	2	3	4	5
1	(Brazil) (Israel)	Armando Vieira; Arie Avidan-Weiss	6; 1	6; 3	12; 10
2	(Brazil) (Israel)	Carlos Alberto Fernandes; Eleazar Davidman	6; 4	6; 4	6; 2
3	(Brazil) (Israel)	Carlos Alberto Fernandes / Armando Vieira; Arie Avidan-Weiss / Eleazar Davidman	1; 6	4; 6	6; 4	6; 2	23; 21
4	(Brazil) (Israel)	Armando Vieira; Eleazar Davidman	4; 6	6; 4	6; 3	6; 2
5	(Brazil) (Israel)	Carlos Alberto Fernandes; Arie Avidan-Weiss	7; 5	6; 3	9; 7

=== Venezuela vs. United States ===
Venezuela
1
Altamira Tennis Club, Caracas, Venezuela
24–26 May 1957

United States
4

			1	2	3	4	5
1	(Venezuela) (United States)	Isaías Pimentel; Grant Golden	6; 8	6; 4	6; 3	6; 3
2	(Venezuela) (United States)	Ricardo López; Vic Seixas	1; 6	0; 6	4; 6
3	(Venezuela) (United States)	Ricardo López / Isaías Pimentel; Tut Bartzen / Vic Seixas	4; 6	3; 6	3; 6
4	(Venezuela) (United States)	Isaías Pimentel; Vic Seixas	4; 6	4; 6	2; 6
5	(Venezuela) (United States)	Ricardo López; Tut Bartzen	3; 6	3; 6	2; 6

== Final ==
=== United States vs. Brazil ===
United States
5
Longwood Cricket Club, Boston, MA, United States
2–4 August 1957
Grass

Brazil
0

			1	2	3	4	5
1	(United States) (Brazil)	Sam Giammalva; Armando Vieira	4; 6	7; 5	6; 4	4; 6	6; 4
2	(United States) (Brazil)	Vic Seixas; Carlos Alberto Fernandes	6; 3	6; 3	6; 2
3	(United States) (Brazil)	Barry MacKay (tennis) / Vic Seixas; Carlos Alberto Fernandes / Armando Vieira	7; 5	9; 7	11; 13	7; 5
4	(United States) (Brazil)	Michael Green; José Agüero	8; 6	5; 7	6; 3	4; 6	6; 3
5	(United States) (Brazil)	Barry MacKay (tennis); Carlos Alberto Fernandes	7; 5	6; 3	6; 0
