= 1955 French Championships – Women's doubles =

Women's doubles
- 1955 French Championships

Final
- Champion: (United States) Beverly Fleitz (United States) Darlene Hard
- Runner-up: (United Kingdom) Shirley Bloomer (United Kingdom) Pat Ward
- Score: 7–5, 6–8, 13–11

Details
- Draw: 27

Events
Singles	men	women		boys	girls
Doubles	men	women	mixed	boys	girls
← 1954 ·	French Championships	· 1956 →

The Women's Doubles tournament at the 1955 French Championships was held from 24 May to 5 June 1955 on the outdoor clay courts at the Stade Roland Garros in Paris, France. The American team of Beverly Fleitz and Darlene Hard won the title, defeating the British pair of Shirley Bloomer and Pat Ward in the final in three sets.

== Draw ==
=== Finals ===
Semifinals
(United Kingdom) Shirley Bloomer (United Kingdom) Pat Ward	6	4	7
(Australia) Mary Carter (Australia) Beryl Penrose	2	6	5
(United Kingdom) Angela Buxton (United Kingdom) Angela Mortimer	6	6	4
(United States) Beverly Fleitz (United States) Darlene Hard	8	3	6

Final
(United Kingdom) Shirley Bloomer (United Kingdom) Pat Ward	5	8	11
(United States) Beverly Fleitz (United States) Darlene Hard	7	6	13

=== Top half ===
First round
(West Germany) Ingeborg Vogler (West Germany) Erika Vollmer	6	6
(France) F. de la Courtie (France) Annie Soisbault	2	4
(Bermuda) Heather Brewer (United Kingdom) Jennifer Middleton	2	2
(France) B de Chambure (France) Colette Monnot	6	6
(Australia) Mary Carter (Australia) Beryl Penrose	6	6
(United States) Constance Clifton (United States) Francesca Leland	0	0
(Italy) Lea Pericoli (Italy) Chiara Ramorino	3	6	6
(United States) Gloria Butler (West Germany) Totta Zehden	6	2	4
(France) Josette Billaz (France) Susan Chatrier	6	6
(Belgium) Anne-Marie Crowet (Belgium) Monique Pouchain	2	2
(France) Myrtil Brunnarius (France) Jacqueline Patorni	7	3
(Switzerland) Ruth Kaufmann (Netherlands) Fenny ten Bosch	9	6

Second round
(United Kingdom) Shirley Bloomer (United Kingdom) Pat Ward	6	6
(France) Josette Amouretti (France) Michelle Bourbonnais	1	4
(West Germany) Ingeborg Vogler (West Germany) Erika Vollmer	6	6
(France) B de Chambure (France) Colette Monnot	2	2
(Australia) Mary Carter (Australia) Beryl Penrose	6	6
(Italy) Lea Pericoli (Italy) Chiara Ramorino	1	1
(France) Josette Billaz (France) Susan Chatrier	6	6
(Switzerland) Ruth Kaufmann (Netherlands) Fenny ten Bosch	4	3

Quarterfinals
(United Kingdom) Shirley Bloomer (United Kingdom) Pat Ward	6	8
(West Germany) Ingeborg Vogler (West Germany) Erika Vollmer	3	6
(Australia) Mary Carter (Australia) Beryl Penrose	6	6
(France) Josette Billaz (France) Susan Chatrier	3	2

Semifinals
(United Kingdom) Shirley Bloomer (United Kingdom) Pat Ward	6	4	7
(Australia) Mary Carter (Australia) Beryl Penrose	2	6	5

=== Bottom half ===
First round
(France) Ginette Bucaille (Belgium) Christiane Mercelis	w	/	o
(Brazil) B. Core (Belgium) Francine Isaac
(France) Suzanne Pannetier (France) Angèle Salvet
(United Kingdom) Angela Buxton (United Kingdom) Angela Mortimer	w	/	o
(France) Françoise Lemal (France) Suzanne Schmitt	2	4
(Australia) Fay Muller (Australia) Jenny Staley	6	6
(United States) Carmen Lampe (France) Claude Michelberger	2	2
(South Africa) Dora Kilian (South Africa) Hazel Redick-Smith	6	6
(Spain) Maria-Josefa de Riba (Spain) T. Villarnau	1	2
(France) Maud Galtier (France) Anne-Marie Seghers	6	6

Second round
(France) Ginette Bucaille (Belgium) Christiane Mercelis	2	5
(United Kingdom) Angela Buxton (United Kingdom) Angela Mortimer	6	7
(Australia) Fay Muller (Australia) Jenny Staley	1	3
(South Africa) Dora Kilian (South Africa) Hazel Redick-Smith	6	6
(France) Maud Galtier (France) Anne-Marie Seghers	6	1	3
(Australia) Nell Hopman (United States) Dorothy Knode	1	6	6
(France) Imbert (France) Jeantet	2	3
(United States) Beverly Fleitz (United States) Darlene Hard	6	6

Quarterfinals
(United Kingdom) Angela Buxton (United Kingdom) Angela Mortimer	6	7	6
(South Africa) Dora Kilian (South Africa) Hazel Redick-Smith	4	9	3
(Australia) Nell Hopman (United States) Dorothy Knode	0	5
(United States) Beverly Fleitz (United States) Darlene Hard	6	7

Semifinals
(United Kingdom) Angela Buxton (United Kingdom) Angela Mortimer	6	6	4
(United States) Beverly Fleitz (United States) Darlene Hard	8	3	6
