= 1956 French Championships (tennis) =

- Date: 15–26 May 1956
- Edition: 55
- Category: 26th Grand Slam (ITF)
- Surface: Clay
- Location: Paris (XVI^{e}), France
- Venue: Stade Roland Garros

Champions

Men's singles
- (Australia) Lew Hoad

Women's singles
- (United States) Althea Gibson

Men's doubles
- (Australia) Don Candy / (United States) Robert Perry

Women's doubles
- (United Kingdom) Angela Buxton / (United States) Althea Gibson

Mixed doubles
- (Australia) Thelma Coyne Long / (Chile) Luis Ayala
- French Championships

The 1956 French Championships (now known as the French Open) was a tennis tournament that took place on the outdoor clay courts at the Stade Roland-Garros in Paris, France. The tournament ran from 15 May until 26 May. It was the 60th staging of the French Championships, and the second Grand Slam tennis event of 1956. Lew Hoad and Althea Gibson won the singles titles.

== Finals ==
=== Men's singles ===
(Australia) Lew Hoad defeated (Sweden) Sven Davidson 6–4, 8–6, 6–3

=== Women's singles ===
(United States) Althea Gibson defeated (United Kingdom) Angela Mortimer 6–0, 12–10

=== Men's doubles ===
(Australia) Don Candy / (United States) Robert Perry defeated (Australia) Ashley Cooper / (Australia) Lew Hoad 7–5, 6–3, 6–3

=== Women's doubles ===
(United Kingdom) Angela Buxton / (United States) Althea Gibson defeated (United States) Darlene Hard / (United States) Dorothy Head Knode 6–8, 8–6, 6–1

=== Mixed doubles ===
(Australia) Thelma Coyne Long / (Chile) Luis Ayala defeated (United States) Darlene Hard / (Australia) Bob Howe 4–6, 6–4, 6–1

Preceded by 1956 Australian Championships	Grand Slams	Succeeded by 1956 Wimbledon Championships
