= 1958 Australian Championships =

- Date: 17-27 January 1958
- Edition: 46th
- Category: Grand Slam (ITF)
- Surface: Grass
- Location: Sydney, Australia
- Venue: White City Tennis Club

Champions

Men's singles
- (Australia) Ashley Cooper

Women's singles
- (United Kingdom) Angela Mortimer

Men's doubles
- (Australia) Ashley Cooper / (Australia) Neale Fraser

Women's doubles
- (Australia) Mary Bevis Hawton / (Australia) Thelma Coyne Long

Mixed doubles
- (Australia) Mary Bevis Hawton / (Australia) Bob Howe
- Australian Championships

The 1958 Australian Championships was a tennis tournament that took place on outdoor Grass courts at the White City Tennis Club, Sydney, Australia from 17 January to 27 January. It was the 46th edition of the Australian Championships (now known as the Australian Open), the 13th held in Sydney, and the first Grand Slam tournament of the year. The singles titles were taken by Ashley Cooper and Angela Mortimer.

== Champions ==
=== Men's singles ===
(Australia) Ashley Cooper defeated (Australia) Malcolm Anderson 7–5, 6–3, 6–4

=== Women's singles ===
(United Kingdom) Angela Mortimer defeated (Australia) Lorraine Coghlan 6–3, 6–4

=== Men's doubles ===
(Australia) Ashley Cooper / (Australia) Neale Fraser defeated (Australia) Roy Emerson / (Australia) Robert Mark 7–5, 6–8, 3–6, 6–3, 7–5

=== Women's doubles ===
(Australia) Mary Bevis Hawton / (Australia) Thelma Coyne Long defeated (Australia) Lorraine Coghlan / (United Kingdom) Angela Mortimer 7–5, 6–8, 6–2

=== Mixed doubles ===
(Australia) Mary Bevis Hawton / (Australia) Bob Howe defeated (United Kingdom) Angela Mortimer / (Australia) Peter Newman 9–11, 6–1, 6–2

Preceded by 1957 U.S. National Championships	Grand Slams	Succeeded by 1958 French Championships
