= 1957 U.S. National Championships (tennis) =

- Date: 30 August – 8 September
- Edition: 77th
- Category: Grand Slam (ILTF)
- Surface: Grass
- Location: Chestnut Hill, Massachusetts; Forest Hills, Queens, New York City; United States
- Venue: Longwood Cricket Club; West Side Tennis Club

Champions

Men's singles
- (Australia) Malcolm Anderson

Women's singles
- (United States) Althea Gibson

Men's doubles
- (Australia) Ashley Cooper / (Australia) Neale Fraser

Women's doubles
- (United States) Louise Brough / (United States) Margaret Osborne

Mixed doubles
- (United States) Althea Gibson / (Denmark) Kurt Nielsen
- U.S. National Championships

The 1957 U.S. National Championships (now known as the US Open) was a tennis tournament that took place on the outdoor grass courts at the West Side Tennis Club, Forest Hills in New York City, New York. The tournament ran from 30 August until 8 September. It was the 77th staging of the U.S. National Championships, and the fourth Grand Slam tennis event of the year.

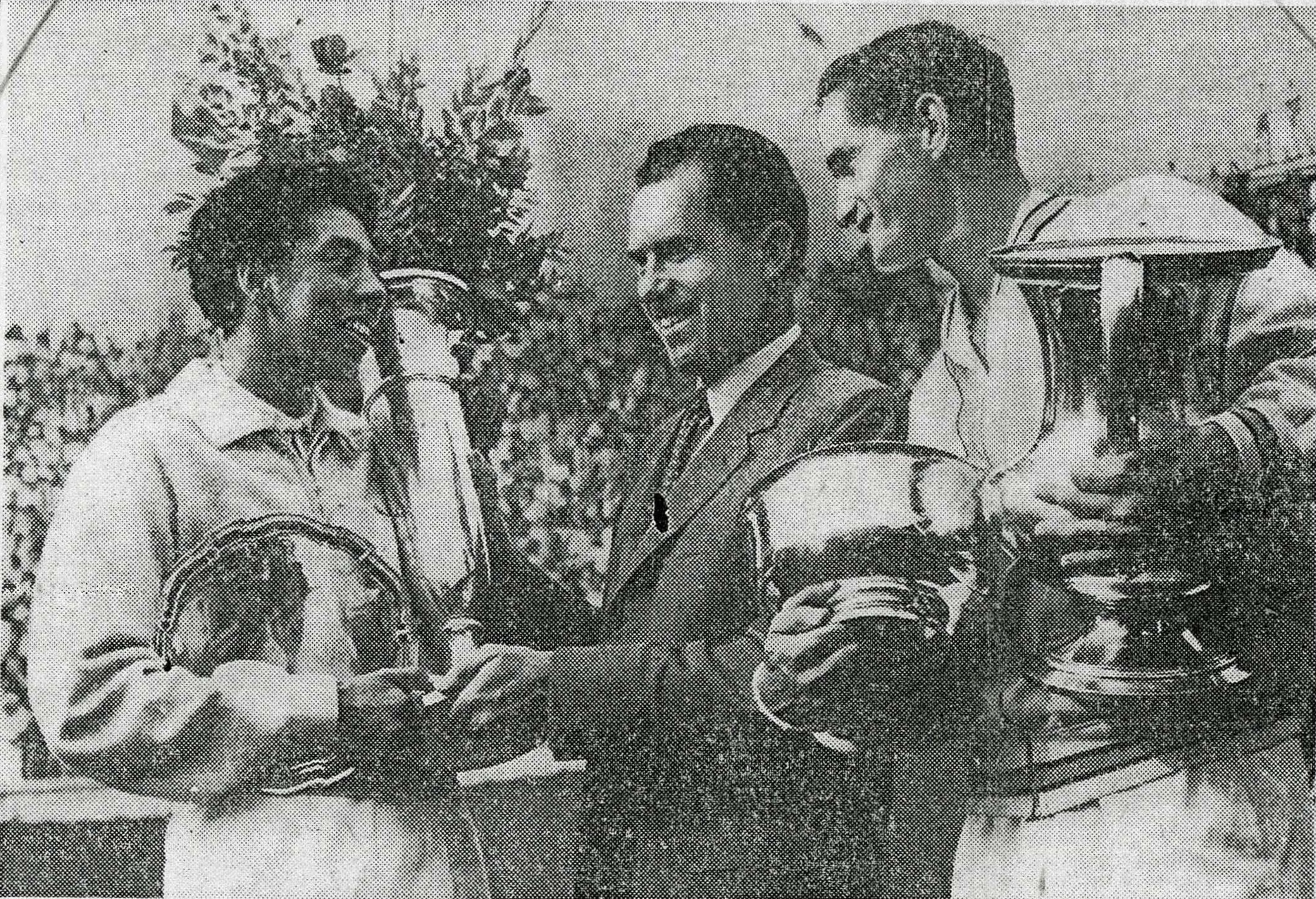
Champions Althea Gibson and Malcolm Anderson holding their trophies alongside with then vice president of the United States Richard Nixon

== Finals ==
=== Men's singles ===
(Australia) Malcolm Anderson (AUS) defeated (Australia) Ashley Cooper (AUS) 10–8, 7–5, 6–4

=== Women's singles ===
(United States) Althea Gibson (USA) defeated (United States) Louise Brough (USA) 6–3, 6–2

=== Men's doubles ===
(Australia) Ashley Cooper (AUS) / (Australia) Neale Fraser (AUS) defeated (United States) Gardnar Mulloy (USA) / (United States) Budge Patty (USA) 4–6, 6–3, 9–7, 6–3

=== Women's doubles ===
(United States) Louise Brough (USA) / (United States) Margaret Osborne duPont (USA) defeated (United States) Althea Gibson (USA) / (United States) Darlene Hard (USA) 6–2, 7–5

=== Mixed doubles ===
(United States) Althea Gibson (USA) / (Denmark) Kurt Nielsen (DEN) defeated (United States) Darlene Hard (USA) / (Australia) Bob Howe (AUS) 6–3, 9–7

Preceded by 1957 Wimbledon Championships	Grand Slams	Succeeded by 1958 Australian Championships
