= 1957 Davis Cup Eastern Zone =

International tennis competition

The Eastern Zone was one of the three regional zones of the 1957 Davis Cup.

5 teams entered the Eastern Zone, with the winner going on to compete in the Inter-Zonal Zone against the winners of the America Zone and Europe Zone. The Philippines defeated Japan in the final and progressed to the Inter-Zonal Zone.

== Draw ==
Quarterfinals; 1–3 March
Madras, India
India	5
Malaya	0
Philippines
bye
bye
Ceylon
bye
Japan

Semifinals; 26–28 April
Manila, Philippines
India	2
Philippines	3
Tokyo, Japan
Ceylon	0
Japan	5

Final; 17–19 May
Manila, Philippines
Philippines	3
Japan	2

== Quarterfinals ==
=== India vs. Malaya ===
India
5
Madras, India
1–3 March 1957

Malaya
0

			1	2	3	4	5
1	(India) (Federation of Malaya)	Naresh Kumar; Moses Tay	6; 4	7; 5	7; 5
2	(India) (Federation of Malaya)	Ramanathan Krishnan; Chew-Bee Ong	6; 2	6; 4	6; 1
3	(India) (Federation of Malaya)	Ramanathan Krishnan / Naresh Kumar; Kit-Soon Khong / Chew-Bee Ong	6; 4	6; 3	6; 1
4	(India) (Federation of Malaya)	A.J. Udaykumar; Moses Tay	6; 2	6; 2	6; 4
5	(India) (Federation of Malaya)	Naresh Kumar; Chew-Bee Ong	6; 1	7; 5	6; 2

== Semifinals ==
=== Philippines vs. India ===
Philippines
3
Manila, Philippines
26–28 April 1957

India
2

			1	2	3	4	5
1	(Philippines) (India)	Raymundo Deyro; Ramanathan Krishnan	4; 6	6; 2	2; 6	6; 4	6; 3
2	(Philippines) (India)	Felicisimo Ampon; Naresh Kumar	6; 2	6; 1	6; 4
3	(Philippines) (India)	Felicisimo Ampon / Raymundo Deyro; Ramanathan Krishnan / Naresh Kumar	7; 5	1; 6	2; 6	4; 6
4	(Philippines) (India)	Raymundo Deyro; Naresh Kumar	6; 3	6; 2	2; 6	6; 4
5	(Philippines) (India)	Juan-Johnson José; Ramanathan Krishnan	2; 6	4; 6	2; 6

=== Japan vs. Ceylon ===
Japan
5
Tokyo, Japan
26–28 April 1957

Ceylon
0

			1	2	3	4	5
1	(Japan) (Dominion of Ceylon)	Kosei Kamo; Rupert Ferdinands	6; 2	6; 3	6; 2
2	(Japan) (Dominion of Ceylon)	Atsushi Miyagi; Bernard Pinto	6; 1	6; 0	6; 2
3	(Japan) (Dominion of Ceylon)	Kosei Kamo / Atsushi Miyagi; Rupert Ferdinands / Bernard Pinto	6; 0	6; 2	7; 5
4	(Japan) (Dominion of Ceylon)	Tunetake Okadome; Rupert Ferdinands	6; 3	5; 7	4; 6	6; 3	6; 3
5	(Japan) (Dominion of Ceylon)	Kosei Kamo; Bernard Pinto	6; 4	6; 1	6; 2

== Final ==
=== Philippines vs. Japan ===
Philippines
3
Manila, Philippines
17–19 May 1957

Japan
2

			1	2	3	4	5
1	(Philippines) (Japan)	Felicisimo Ampon; Atsushi Miyagi	3; 6	6; 4	6; 1	6; 4
2	(Philippines) (Japan)	Raymundo Deyro; Kosei Kamo	6; 2	4; 6	6; 1	2; 6	6; 3
3	(Philippines) (Japan)	Felicisimo Ampon / Raymundo Deyro; Kosei Kamo / Atsushi Miyagi	4; 6	6; 4	5; 7	2; 6
4	(Philippines) (Japan)	Felicisimo Ampon; Kosei Kamo	6; 1	4; 6	5; 7	6; 3	6; 1
5	(Philippines) (Japan)	Eduardo Dungo; Atsushi Miyagi	6; 4	1; 6	1; 6	4; 6
