= Graham Lovett (tennis) =

Australian tennis player and administrator

- Full name: Graham Gordon Lovett, AM
- Country (sports): Australia
- Born: May 1936; New South Wales, Australia
- Died: 2 September 1999 (aged 63); New South Wales, Australia
- Turned pro: 1954 (amateur tour)
- Retired: 1960

Singles

Grand Slam singles results
- Australian Open: QF (1957)

Doubles

Grand Slam doubles results
- Australian Open: QF (1956, 1957, 1958)

Mixed doubles

Grand Slam mixed doubles results
- Australian Open: SF (1958)

Graham Lovett (May 1936 – 2 September 1999) was an Australian tennis player and later one of the top sports administrators in Australia. In his 20s he was State manager of Dunlop sporting goods and later became managing director of Dunlop Slazenger. Lovett set up the Australian Indoors tennis tournament, which ran from 1973 to 1994 (he was also on the ATP board). In 1982 Lovett founded Sport Australia. He was involved in many different sports such as rugby league, swimming, cricket, basketball, triathlon and squash. He was involved in Sydney's successful Olympic bid for the 2000 Olympics, though died of cancer a few months before the Olympics were held. Outside of sports, Lovett was chairman of the Sydney Eye Hospital Foundation. He first entered the Australian tennis championships in 1956 and lost in round one to Don Candy. At the 1957 championships, Lovett beat Mike Davies before being beaten easily by Neale Fraser in the quarter-finals. In 1958 he lost in round two to Bob Howe.
