= 1956 French Championships – Women's doubles =

Women's doubles
- 1956 French Championships

Final
- Champion: (United Kingdom) Angela Buxton (United States) Althea Gibson
- Runner-up: (United States) Darlene Hard (United States) Dorothy Head Knode
- Score: 6–8, 8–6, 6–1

Details
- Draw: 27

Events
Singles	men	women
Doubles	men	women
← 1955 ·	French Championships	· 1957 →

The 1956 French Championships Women's doubles was one of the competitions of the 1956 French Championships, a tennis tournament held at the Stade Roland-Garros in Paris, France from 15 May until 26 May 1956. The matches were played in a best-of-three sets format. Angela Buxton and Althea Gibson defeated Darlene Hard and Dorothy Head Knode 6–8, 8–6, 6–1 in the final to win the title.

== Draw ==
=== Finals ===
Quarterfinals
(United Kingdom) Shirley Bloomer (United Kingdom) Angela Mortimer	4	6	2
(Australia) Jenny Hoad (Australia) Fay Muller	6	3	6
(United States) Darlene Hard (United States) Dorothy Head Knode	6	6
(France) Maud Galtier (France) Anne-Marie Seghers	4	0
(France) Ginette Bucaille (France) Suzanne Le Besnerais	4	5
(United Kingdom) Angela Buxton (United States) Althea Gibson	6	7
(France) Josette Amouretti (Czechoslovakia) Věra Puzejova	6	6
(France) Andrée Varin (France) Michelle Bourbonnais	3	1

Semifinals
(Australia) Jenny Hoad (Australia) Fay Muller	3	3
(United States) Darlene Hard (United States) Dorothy Head Knode	6	6
(United Kingdom) Angela Buxton (United States) Althea Gibson	7	3	6
(France) Josette Amouretti (Czechoslovakia) Věra Puzejova	5	6	2

Final
(United States) Darlene Hard (United States) Dorothy Head Knode	8	6	1
(United Kingdom) Angela Buxton (United States) Althea Gibson	5	8	6
