= Fenny ten Bosch =

Dutch tennis player

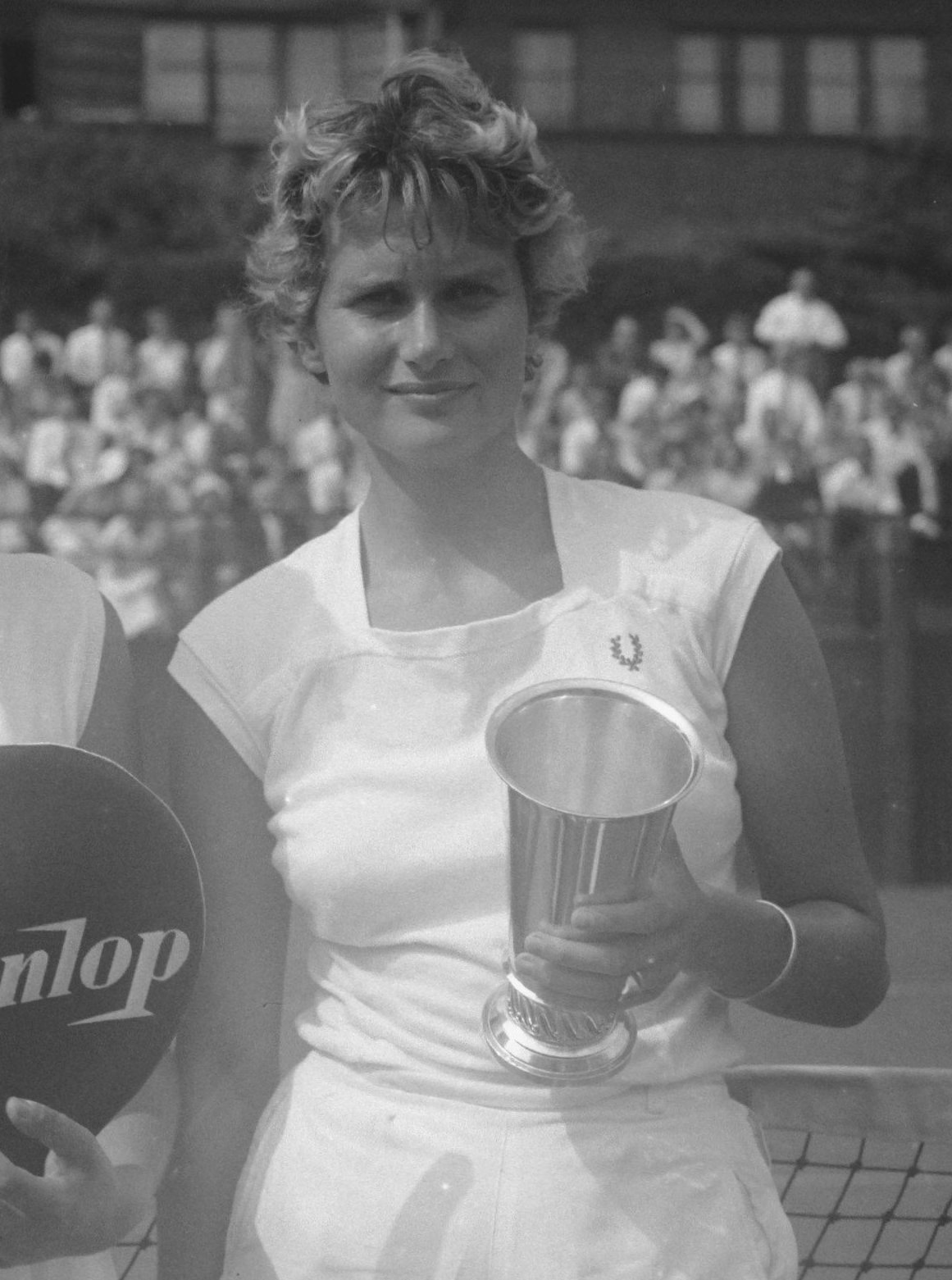
- Ten Bosch in 1958
- Country (sports): Netherlands
- Born: 1935; The Hague, Netherlands
- Died: 16 January 1959; The Hague, Netherlands

Singles

Grand Slam singles results
- French Open: 3R (1955)
- Wimbledon: 3R (1955)

Doubles

Grand Slam doubles results
- French Open: 2R (1953, 1955)
- Wimbledon: 1R (1953, 1954, 1955)

Grand Slam mixed doubles results
- Wimbledon: 2R (1953, 1954)

Fenny Jeanny Ida ten Bosch (1935 – 16 January 1959) was a Dutch tennis player who was active in the 1950s.

She started playing tennis when she was eight years old on the tennis court her father had build in their garden. Ten Bosch became the Wimbledon Girls singles champion in 1952 after defeating Rita Davar from India in the final in three sets. Between 1952 and 1955 she competed in the French and Wimbledon championships. Her best singles result came in 1955 when she reached the third round at both the French Championships and Wimbledon.

In 1953 she won the Dutch national titles in singles, doubles and mixed doubles. The previous year, 1952, she had won the national doubles title with Nel Hermsen and they would repeat that feat in 1955. Ten Bosch won her sixth national title in 1958, defeating Trix Sauter in the singles final.

After marrying Jan de Soet, who later became president of the KLM Royal Dutch Airlines, on 3 March 1956 in Voorburg, she played under the name Fenny de Soet-Ten Bosch. The couple had one son, born in 1956. She died suddenly on 16 January 1959 during the pregnancy of her second child.
