= 1956 French Championships – Men's doubles =

Men's doubles
- 1956 French Championships

Final
- Champion: (Australia) Don Candy (United States) Bob Perry
- Runner-up: (Australia) Ashley Cooper (Australia) Lew Hoad
- Score: 7–5, 6–3, 6–3

Details
- Draw: 32

Events
| Singles | men | women |
| Doubles | men | women |
- French Championships

The 1956 French Championships men's doubles was one of the competitions of the 1956 French Championships, a tennis tournament held at the Stade Roland-Garros in Paris, France from 15 May until 26 May 1956. The draw consisted of 32 teams and matches were played in a best-of-five sets format. Don Candy and Bob Perry defeated Ashley Cooper and Lew Hoad 7–5, 6–3, 6–3 in the final to win the title. The winning teams received 25,000 French franc per player with the runner-up players earning 12,000 Fr and the four losing semifinalists receiving 6,000 Fr each.

== Draw ==
=== Finals ===
Quarterfinals
(Italy) Nicola Pietrangeli (Italy) Orlando Sirola | 3 | 7 | 4 | 4
(Australia) Don Candy (United States) Bob Perry | 6 | 5 | 6 | 6
(Mexico) Luis Ayala (Sweden) Sven Davidson | 4 | 6 | 6 | 6
(South Africa) Gordon Forbes (South Africa) Ian Vermaak | 6 | 4 | 4 | 4
(Spain) Andrés Gimeno (Spain) Fernando Olazaga | 5 | 2 | 5
(Egypt) Jaroslav Drobný (South Africa) Trevor Fancutt | 7 | 6 | 7
(Belgium) Jacques Brichant (Belgium) Gino Mezzi | 1 | 1 | 3
(Australia) Ashley Cooper (Australia) Lew Hoad | 6 | 6 | 6

Semifinals
(Australia) Don Candy (United States) Bob Perry | 6 | 3 | 11 | 9
(Mexico) Luis Ayala (Sweden) Sven Davidson | 3 | 6 | 9 | 7
(Egypt) Jaroslav Drobný (South Africa) Trevor Fancutt | 4 | 2 | 8
(Australia) Ashley Cooper (Australia) Lew Hoad | 6 | 6 | 10

Final
(Australia) Don Candy (United States) Bob Perry | 7 | 6 | 6
(Australia) Ashley Cooper (Australia) Lew Hoad | 5 | 3 | 3
