= Michael Green (tennis) =

American tennis player (born 1937)

Mike Green
- Full name: Michael E. Green
- Country (sports): United States
- Born: February 20, 1937 (age 88); Miami, Florida, US
- Died: 2016; Ohio

Singles

Grand Slam singles results
- Australian Open: QF (1957, 1958)
- Wimbledon: 4R (1957)
- US Open: 4R (1958)

Doubles

Grand Slam doubles results
- Australian Open: SF (1958)
- Wimbledon: QF (1957)

Mixed doubles

Grand Slam mixed doubles results
- Australian Open: 2R (1958)

Team competitions
- Davis Cup: F (1956^{Ch}, 1957^{Ch})

Michael E. Green (born 20 February 1937 in Miami, Florida) is a former amateur tennis player from the United States who competed in the 1950s and 1960s. He played on the 1956 NCAA Championship Team at UCLA and was the No. 2 player behind Mike Franks for three years.. He reached the quarterfinals of the Australian Championships in 1957 and 1958. Green played Davis Cup in 1956 and 1957, both years the team reached the Challenge Round before losing to Australia. Mike died in Ohio in 2016.

In 1959 he was a runner-up to Alex Olmedo in the singles event at the Eastern Grass Court Championships.
