= 1958 Australian Championships – Men's singles =

Men's singles
- 1958 Australian Championships

Final
- Champion: (Australia) Ashley Cooper
- Runner-up: (Australia) Mal Anderson
- Score: 7–5, 6–3, 6–4

Details
- Draw: 32
- Seeds: 12

Events
Singles	men	women
Doubles	men	women
- Australian Championships

Third-seeded Ashley Cooper defeated Mal Anderson 7–5, 6–3, 6–4 in the final to win the men's singles tennis title at the 1958 Australian Championships.

== Seeds ==
The seeded players are listed below. Ashley Cooper is the champion; others show the round in which they were eliminated.

1. (Australia) Mal Anderson (finalist)
2. (United States) Barry MacKay (tennis) (second round)
3. (Australia) Ashley Cooper (champion)
4. (United States) Ron Holmberg (first round)
5. (Australia) Neale Fraser (semifinals)
6. (United States) Michael Green (quarterfinals)
7. (Australia) Mervyn Rose (semifinals)
8. (South Africa) Trevor Fancutt (quarterfinals)
9. (Australia) Roy Emerson (quarterfinals)
10. (Australia) Bob Howe (quarterfinals)
11. (Australia) Rod Laver (second round)
12. (Australia) Bob Mark (second round)

== Draw ==
=== Key ===
- Q = Qualifier
- WC = Wild card
- LL = Lucky loser
- r = Retired

=== Finals ===
Quarterfinals
1	(Australia) Mal Anderson	6	6	5	12
8	(South Africa) Trevor Fancutt	3	4	7	10
7	(Australia) Mervyn Rose	3	4	6	8	6
10	(Australia) Bob Howe	6	6	1	6	0
3	(Australia) Ashley Cooper	6	6	4	5	6
6	(United States) Michael Green	1	2	6	7	2
5	(Australia) Neale Fraser	4	6	6	6
9	(Australia) Roy Emerson	6	1	4	3

Semifinals
1	(Australia) Mal Anderson	6	5	6	19
7	(Australia) Mervyn Rose	2	7	4	17
3	(Australia) Ashley Cooper	6	3	10	6
5	(Australia) Neale Fraser	3	6	8	3

Final
1	(Australia) Mal Anderson	5	3	4
3	(Australia) Ashley Cooper	7	6	6

=== Earlier rounds ===
==== Section 1 ====
First round
1	(Australia) Anderson	6	6	6
(Australia) Hewitt	3	2	0
(Australia) Phillips-Moore	6	6	6
(Australia) Jacques	2	4	2
12	(Australia) Mark	6	6	6
(Australia) O'Kane	1	2	2
8	(South Africa) Fancutt	7	6	8	6
(Australia) Newman	5	8	6	4
7	(Australia) Rose	6	3	7	6
(Australia) May	4	6	5	4
(Australia) Woodcock	6	5	11	6	6
(Australia) Fraser	8	7	9	2	3
10	(Australia) Howe	6	6	6
(Australia) Gorman	4	4	4
(Australia) Lovett
4	(United States) Holmberg	w/o

Second round
1	(Australia) Anderson	6	6	6
(Australia) Phillips-Moore	3	3	2
12	(Australia) Mark	3	6	6	10	8
8	(South Africa) Fancutt	6	3	4	12	10
7	(Australia) Rose	6	6	7
(Australia) Woodcock	4	3	5
10	(Australia) Howe	6	6	6
(Australia) Lovett	4	3	2

Quarterfinals
1	(Australia) Anderson	6	6	5	12
8	(South Africa) Fancutt	3	4	7	10
7	(Australia) Rose	3	4	6	8	6
10	(Australia) Howe	6	6	1	6	0

Semifinals
1	(Australia) Anderson	6	5	6	19
7	(Australia) Rose	2	7	4	17

==== Section 2 ====
First round
3	(Australia) Cooper	6	6	6
(Australia) Clements	1	2	1
(Australia) Pearce	6	4	4	6	6
(Australia) Candy	4	6	6	1	2
11	(Australia) Laver	6	3	6	6
(Australia) Stolle	4	6	3	3
6	(United States) Green	6	7	6
(Australia) Reid	3	5	4
5	(Australia) Fraser	6	6	6
(Australia) Fletcher	0	1	1
(Australia) Mulligan	6	8	6
(Australia) Edwards	3	6	3
9	(Australia) Emerson	6	6	6
(Australia) Gibson	3	1	2
2	(United States) MacKay	6	6	6
(Australia) Reid	2	2	2

Second round
3	(Australia) Cooper	6	6	6
(Australia) Pearce	3	3	0
11	(Australia) Laver	6	3	4	4
6	(United States) Green	4	6	6	6
5	(Australia) Fraser	9	9	6
(Australia) Mulligan	7	7	2
9	(Australia) Emerson	6	4	9	9
2	(United States) MacKay	4	6	7	7

Quarterfinals
3	(Australia) Cooper	6	6	4	5	6
6	(United States) Green	1	2	6	7	2
5	(Australia) Fraser	4	6	6	6
9	(Australia) Emerson	6	1	4	3

Semifinals
3	(Australia) Cooper	6	3	10	6
5	(Australia) Fraser	3	6	8	3

Preceded by 1957 U.S. National Championships	Grand Slam men's singles	Succeeded by 1958 French Championships
