= 1958 French Championships (tennis) =

- Date: 20–31 May 1958
- Edition: 57
- Category: 28th Grand Slam (ITF)
- Surface: Clay
- Location: Paris (XVI^{e}), France
- Venue: Stade Roland Garros

Champions

Men's singles
- (Australia) Mervyn Rose

Women's singles
- (Hungary) Zsuzsa Körmöczy

Men's doubles
- (Australia) Ashley Cooper / (Australia) Neale Fraser

Women's doubles
- (Mexico) Rosie Reyes / (Mexico) Yola Ramírez

Mixed doubles
- (United Kingdom) Shirley Bloomer / (Italy) Nicola Pietrangeli
← 1957 ·	French Championships	· 1959 →

The 1958 French Championships (now known as the French Open) was a tennis tournament that took place on the outdoor clay courts at the Stade Roland-Garros in Paris, France. The tournament ran from 20 May until 31 May. It was the 62nd staging of the French Championships, and the second Grand Slam tennis event of 1958. Mervyn Rose and Zsuzsi Körmöczy won the singles titles.

== Finals ==
=== Men's singles ===
(Australia) Mervyn Rose defeated (Chile) Luis Ayala 6–3, 6–4, 6–4

=== Women's singles ===
(Hungary) Zsuzsa Körmöczy (HUN) defeated (United Kingdom) Shirley Bloomer (GBR) 6–4, 1–6, 6–2

=== Men's doubles ===
(Australia) Ashley Cooper / (Australia) Neale Fraser defeated (Australia) Bob Howe / (South Africa) Abe Segal 3–6, 8–6, 6–3, 7–5

=== Women's doubles ===
(Mexico) Rosie Reyes / (Mexico) Yola Ramírez defeated (Australia) Mary Bevis Hawton / (Australia) Thelma Coyne Long 6–4, 7–5

=== Mixed doubles ===
(United Kingdom) Shirley Bloomer / (Italy) Nicola Pietrangeli defeated (Australia) Lorraine Coghlan / (Australia) Bob Howe 8–6, 6–2

Preceded by 1958 Australian Championships	Grand Slams	Succeeded by 1958 Wimbledon Championships
