= 1955 French Championships (tennis) =

- Date: 24 May – 4 June 1955
- Edition: 54
- Category: 25th Grand Slam (ITF)
- Surface: Clay
- Location: Paris (XVI^{e}), France
- Venue: Stade Roland Garros

Champions

Men's singles
- (United States) Tony Trabert

Women's singles
- (United Kingdom) Angela Mortimer

Men's doubles
- (United States) Vic Seixas / (United States) Tony Trabert

Women's doubles
- (United States) Beverly Baker Fleitz / (United States) Darlene Hard

Mixed doubles
- (United States) Darlene Hard / (South Africa) Gordon Forbes
- French Championships

The 1955 French Championships (now known as the French Open) was a tennis tournament that took place on the outdoor clay courts at the Stade Roland-Garros in Paris, France. The tournament ran from 24 May until 4 June. It was the 59th staging of the French Championships, and the second Grand Slam tennis event of 1955. Tony Trabert and Angela Mortimer won the singles titles.

== Finals ==
=== Men's singles ===
(United States) Tony Trabert defeated (Sweden) Sven Davidson 2–6, 6–1, 6–4, 6–2

=== Women's singles ===
(United Kingdom) Angela Mortimer defeated (United States) Dorothy Knode 2–6, 7–5, 10–8

=== Men's doubles ===
(United States) Vic Seixas / (United States) Tony Trabert defeated (Italy) Nicola Pietrangeli / (Italy) Orlando Sirola 6–1, 4–6, 6–2, 6–4

=== Women's doubles ===
(United States) Beverly Baker Fleitz / (United States) Darlene Hard defeated (United Kingdom) Shirley Bloomer / (United Kingdom) Patricia Ward 7–5, 6–8, 13–11

=== Mixed doubles ===
(United States) Darlene Hard / (South Africa) Gordon Forbes defeated (Australia) Jenny Staley / (Chile) Luis Ayala 5–7, 6–1, 6–2

Preceded by 1955 Australian Championships	Grand Slams	Succeeded by 1955 Wimbledon Championships
