= 1958 Australian Championships – Women's singles =

Women's singles
- 1958 Australian Championships

Final
- Champion: (United Kingdom) Angela Mortimer
- Runner-up: (Australia) Lorraine Coghlan
- Score: 6–3, 6–4

Details
- Draw: 32
- Seeds: 8

Events
Singles	men	women
Doubles	men	women
- Australian Championships

First-seeded Angela Mortimer defeated Lorraine Coghlan 6–3, 6–4 in the final to win the women's singles tennis title at the 1958 Australian Championships.

== Seeds ==
The seeded players are listed below. Angela Mortimer is the champion; others show the round in which they were eliminated.

1. (United Kingdom) Angela Mortimer (champion)
2. (Australia) Lorraine Coghlan (finalist)
3. (Australia) Mary Carter (semifinals)
4. (Australia) Mary Hawton (quarterfinals)
5. (Australia) Daphne Fancutt (first round)
6. (Australia) Maureen McCalman (second round)
7. (Australia) Thelma Long (second round)
8. (Australia) Fay Muller (quarterfinals)

== Draw ==
=== Key ===
- Q = Qualifier
- WC = Wild card
- LL = Lucky loser
- r = Retired

=== Finals ===
Quarterfinals
1	(United Kingdom) Angela Mortimer	6	6
8	(Australia) Fay Muller	1	2
4	(Australia) Mary Hawton	5	8	4
(Australia) Betty Holstein	7	6	6
(Australia) Beth Jones	6	1
3	(Australia) Mary Carter	8	6
(Australia) Margot Rayson	3	1
2	(Australia) Lorraine Coghlan	6	6

Semifinals
1	(United Kingdom) Angela Mortimer	6	6
(Australia) Betty Holstein	2	1
3	(Australia) Mary Carter	1	1
2	(Australia) Lorraine Coghlan	6	6

Finals
1	(United Kingdom) Angela Mortimer	6	6
2	(Australia) Lorraine Coghlan	3	4

=== Earlier rounds ===
==== Section 1 ====
First round
1	(United Kingdom) Mortimer	6	6
(Australia) McCamley	2	0
(Australia) Hellyer	4	6	9
(Australia) Hopman	6	2	7
8	(Australia) Muller	6	6
(Australia) Turner	3	3
(Australia) Hattersley	4	6	6
(Australia) Tegart	6	1	3
4	(Australia) Hawton	7	6
(Australia) Lehane	5	2
(Australia) Fenton	4	6	6
(Australia) Court	6	4	4
(Australia) Gibson
5	(Australia) Fancutt	w/o
(Australia) Holstein	6	6
(Australia) Langley	3	2

Second round
1	(United Kingdom) Mortimer	6	6
(Australia) Hellyer	1	1
8	(Australia) Muller	8	6
(Australia) Hattersley	6	1
4	(Australia) Hawton	6	6
(Australia) Fenton	0	2
(Australia) Gibson	3	0
(Australia) Holstein	6	6

Quarterfinals
1	(United Kingdom) Mortimer	6	6
8	(Australia) Muller	1	2
4	(Australia) Hawton	5	8	4
(Australia) Holstein	7	6	6

Semifinals
1	(United Kingdom) Mortimer	6	6
(Australia) Holstein	2	1

==== Section 2 ====
First round
(Australia) Jones	9	6
(Australia) Thiele	7	0
7	(Australia) Long	6	6
(Australia) Leonard	2	3
(Australia) Bowden	6	6
(Australia) Roberts	4	2
3	(Australia) Carter	10	6
(Australia) Duldig	8	2
(Australia) Rayson	3	6	6
(Australia) Parmenter	6	1	2
6	(Australia) McCalman	6	6
(Australia) Ferguson	2	2
(Australia) Marsh	6	6
(Australia) Wells	3	2
2	(Australia) Coghlan	6	6
(Australia) Shearer	3	3

Second round
(Australia) Jones
7	(Australia) Long	w/o
(Australia) Bowden	8	2
3	(Australia) Carter	10	6
(Australia) Rayson	6	6
6	(Australia) McCalman	4	4
(Australia) Marsh	2	5
2	(Australia) Coghlan	6	7

Quarterfinals
(Australia) Jones	6	1
3	(Australia) Carter	8	6
(Australia) Rayson	3	1
2	(Australia) Coghlan	6	6

Semifinals
3	(Australia) Carter	1	1
2	(Australia) Coghlan	6	6

Preceded by 1957 U.S. National Championships – Women's singles	Grand Slam women's singles	Succeeded by 1958 French Championships – Women's singles
