= Andrzej Licis =

Polish tennis player (1932–2019)

- Country (sports): Poland
- Born: 10 September 1932; Olkusz, Poland
- Died: 17 April 2019 (aged 86); Évian-les-Bains, France

Singles

Grand Slam singles results
- French Open: 2R (1957, 1960, 1961, 1964)
- Wimbledon: 2R (1958)
- US Open: 2R (1962)

Andrzej Licis (10 September 1932 – 17 April 2019) was a Polish international tennis player. He competed in the Davis Cup a number of times, from 1956 to 1960.
