= Maria Chiara Ramorino =

Italian orienteer and tennis player

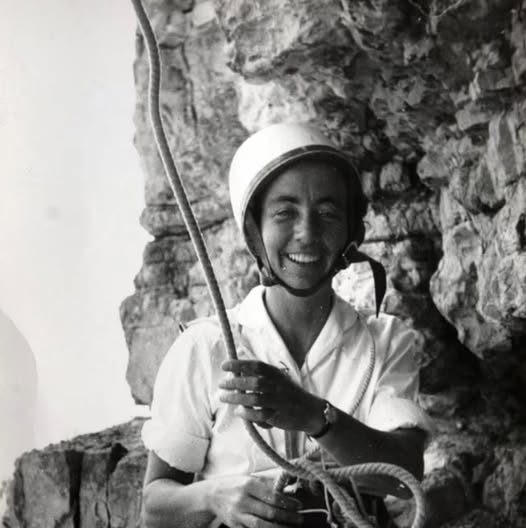
- Country (sports): Italy
- Residence: Rome, Italy
- Born: 13 April 1931 (age 95) Marche, Italy
Medal record
Event	1st	2nd	3rd
Summer Universiade	2	0	0

Maria Chiara Ramorino (born 13 April 1931) is an Italian orienteer and a former tennis player.

== Biography ==
She won two medals at the Summer Universiade. After her tennis career she became a proponent of the sport of Orienteering, and in 2008 wrote also a book of this theme. She was also a scientist, among the researchers who participated to the first Italian missions to Antarctica in the early 1990s, and manager of the Italian team that compiled and promulgated the SCAR Composite Gazetteer of Antarctica, 1998–2006. The Ramorino Glacier in Antarctica was named after her in 2006 by US-ACAN.

== Achievements ==
Year	Competition	Venue	Event	Medal	Notes
1959	Summer Universiade	Italy Turin	Mixed doubles	1st	
1959	Summer Universiade	Italy Turin	Women double	1st	

Year	Competition	Venue	Event	Medal	Notes
2011	World Orienteering Master Championship	Hungary Pécs	Sprint W80	2nd	

Year	Competition	Venue	Event	Medal	Notes
2011	Campionati Italiani	Italy Italia	Middle W65	3rd	
2011	Campionati Italiani	Italy Italia	Sprint W65	2nd	

Year	Competition	Venue	Event	Medal	Notes
2009	Campionati Italiani	Italy Italia	Long W65	3rd	

Year	Competition	Venue	Event	Medal	Notes
2008	Campionati Italiani	Italy Italia	Long W65	3rd	

Year	Competition	Venue	Event	Medal	Notes
2004	Campionati Italiani	Italy Italia	Middle W60	3rd	

Year	Competition	Venue	Event	Medal	Notes
2002	Campionati Italiani	Italy Italia	Lunga Distanza W60	3rd	
2002	Campionati Italiani	Italy Italia	Distanza Classica W60	2nd	

Year	Competition	Venue	Event	Medal	Notes
2000	Campionati Italiani	Italy Italia	Corta Distanza W60	2nd	
2000	Campionati Italiani	Italy Italia	Lunga Distanza W60	3rd	
