= 1957 Davis Cup =

1957 edition of the Davis Cup

Details
- Duration: 1 March – 28 December 1957
- Edition: 46th
- Teams: 36

Champion
- Winning nation: Australia

The 1957 Davis Cup was the 46th edition of the Davis Cup, the most important tournament between national teams in men's tennis. 24 teams entered the Europe Zone, 7 teams entered the America Zone, and 5 teams entered the Eastern Zone. Malaya, Lebanon and Venezuela made their first appearances in the competition.

The United States defeated Brazil in the America Zone final, the Philippines defeated Japan in the Eastern Zone final, and Belgium defeated Italy in the Europe Zone final. In the Inter-Zonal Zone, the United States defeated the Philippines in the semifinal and then defeated Belgium in the final. In the Challenge Round the United States were defeated by defending champions Australia. The final was played at the Kooyong Stadium in Melbourne, Australia on 26–28 December.

== America Zone ==
=== Draw ===
Quarterfinals; 27–29 April; 17–19 May; 19–21 July
Israel
bye
Montreal, Canada (grass)
Canada	2
Brazil	3
Caracas, Venezuela
Venezuela	3
Cuba	2
Port of Spain, Trinidad and Tobago (clay)
Caribbean/West Indies	0
United States	5

Semifinals; 24–26 May; 27–29 July
Montreal, Canada (grass)
Israel	0
Brazil	5
Caracas, Venezuela
Venezuela	1
United States	4

Final; 2–4 August
Boston, MA, United States (grass)
Brazil	0
United States	5

=== Final ===
United States vs. Brazil

United States
5
Longwood Cricket Club, Boston, MA, United States
2–4 August 1957
Grass

Brazil
0

			1	2	3	4	5
1	(United States) (Brazil)	Sam Giammalva; Armando Vieira	4; 6	7; 5	6; 4	4; 6	6; 4
2	(United States) (Brazil)	Vic Seixas; Carlos Alberto Fernandes	6; 3	6; 3	6; 2
3	(United States) (Brazil)	Barry MacKay / Vic Seixas; Carlos Alberto Fernandes / Armando Vieira	7; 5	9; 7	11; 13	7; 5
4	(United States) (Brazil)	Michael Green; José Agüero	8; 6	5; 7	6; 3	4; 6	6; 3
5	(United States) (Brazil)	Barry MacKay; Carlos Alberto Fernandes	7; 5	6; 3	6; 0

== Eastern Zone ==
=== Draw ===
Quarterfinals; 1–3 March
Madras, India
India	5
Malaya	0
Philippines
bye
bye
Ceylon
bye
Japan

Semifinals; 26–28 April
Manila, Philippines
India	2
Philippines	3
Tokyo, Japan
Ceylon	0
Japan	5

Final; 17–19 May
Manila, Philippines
Philippines	3
Japan	2

=== Final ===
Philippines vs. Japan

Philippines
3
Manila, Philippines
17–19 May 1957

Japan
2

			1	2	3	4	5
1	(Philippines) (Japan)	Felicisimo Ampon; Atsushi Miyagi	3; 6	6; 4	6; 1	6; 4
2	(Philippines) (Japan)	Raymundo Deyro; Kosei Kamo	6; 2	4; 6	6; 1	2; 6	6; 3
3	(Philippines) (Japan)	Felicisimo Ampon / Raymundo Deyro; Kosei Kamo / Atsushi Miyagi	4; 6	6; 4	5; 7	2; 6
4	(Philippines) (Japan)	Felicisimo Ampon; Kosei Kamo	6; 1	4; 6	5; 7	6; 3	6; 1
5	(Philippines) (Japan)	Eduardo Dungo; Atsushi Miyagi	6; 4	1; 6	1; 6	4; 6

== Europe Zone ==
=== Draw ===
First Round; 19–29 April
Sweden
bye
Romania	0
Austria	5
Denmark
bye
Spain	0
South Africa	5
Chile
bye
Luxembourg	0
Poland	5
Italy
bye
Netherlands	4
Norway	1
Hungary	w/o
Ireland
bye
Belgium
Yugoslavia	0
Mexico	5
bye
West Germany
Lebanon	0
New Zealand	5
bye
Great Britain
Switzerland	1
Czechoslovakia	4
bye
France

Second Round; 10–20 May
Vienna, Austria (clay)
Sweden	4
Austria	1
Copenhagen, Denmark (clay)
Denmark	4
South Africa	1
Warsaw, Poland
Chile	2
Poland	3
Scheveningen, Netherlands (clay)
Italy	5
Netherlands	0
Brussels, Belgium
Hungary	1
Belgium	4
Cologne, West Germany
Mexico	3
West Germany	1
Eastbourne, England (grass)
New Zealand	0
Great Britain	5
Lyon, France (clay)
Czechoslovakia	0
France	4

Quarterfinals; 7–10 June
Stockholm, Sweden (clay)
Sweden	4
Denmark	1
Palermo, Italy (clay)
Poland	1
Italy	4
Brussels, Belgium (clay)
Belgium	3
Mexico	2
Paris, France (clay)
Great Britain	3
France	2

Semifinals; 19–22 July
Milan, Italy (clay)
Sweden	1
Italy	3
Brussels, Belgium (clay)
Belgium	3
Great Britain	2

Final; 2–5 August
Brussels, Belgium
Italy	2
Belgium	3

=== Final ===
Belgium vs. Italy

Belgium
3
Brussels, Belgium
2–5 August 1957

Italy
2

			1	2	3	4	5
1	(Belgium) (Italy)	Jacques Brichant; Nicola Pietrangeli	4; 6	4; 6	3; 6
2	(Belgium) (Italy)	Philippe Washer; Giuseppe Merlo	6; 2	8; 6	6; 2
3	(Belgium) (Italy)	Jacques Brichant / Philippe Washer; Nicola Pietrangeli / Orlando Sirola	3; 6	2; 6	5; 7
4	(Belgium) (Italy)	Jacques Brichant; Giuseppe Merlo	6; 8	7; 5	6; 8	7; 5	6; 1
5	(Belgium) (Italy)	Philippe Washer; Nicola Pietrangeli	6; 4	3; 6	6; 8	7; 5	6; 2

== Inter-Zonal Zone ==
=== Draw ===
Semifinals; 5–7 December
EUR	Belgium
bye
Adelaide, Australia (grass)
EAS	Philippines	0
AME	United States	5

Final; 12–14 December
Brisbane, Australia (grass)
EUR	Belgium	2
AME	United States	3

=== Semifinals ===
United States vs. Philippines

United States
5
Memorial Drive Park, Adelaide, Australia
5–7 December 1957
Grass

Philippines
0

			1	2	3	4	5
1	(United States) (Philippines)	Vic Seixas; Felicisimo Ampon	6; 1	6; 1	6; 2
2	(United States) (Philippines)	Herbie Flam; Raymundo Deyro	6; 3	6; 2	6; 2
3	(United States) (Philippines)	Gardnar Mulloy / Vic Seixas; Felicisimo Ampon / Raymundo Deyro	6; 1	6; 3	6; 2
4	(United States) (Philippines)	Herbie Flam; Felicisimo Ampon	6; 3	6; 2	6; 4
5	(United States) (Philippines)	Vic Seixas; Raymundo Deyro	6; 2	6; 4	6; 3

=== Final ===
United States vs. Belgium

United States
3
Milton Courts, Brisbane, Australia
12–14 December 1957
Grass

Belgium
2

			1	2	3	4	5
1	(United States) (Belgium)	Herbie Flam; Jacques Brichant	6; 3	4; 6	1; 6	6; 3	6; 3
2	(United States) (Belgium)	Vic Seixas; Philippe Washer	6; 0	6; 3	6; 4
3	(United States) (Belgium)	Gardnar Mulloy / Vic Seixas; Jacques Brichant / Philippe Washer	5; 7	3; 6	6; 4	3; 6
4	(United States) (Belgium)	Herbie Flam; Philippe Washer	2; 6	3; 6	6; 0	3; 6
5	(United States) (Belgium)	Vic Seixas; Jacques Brichant	10; 8	6; 0	6; 1

== Challenge Round ==
Australia vs. United States

Australia
3
Kooyong Stadium, Melbourne, Australia
26–28 December 1957
Grass

United States
2

			1	2	3	4	5
1	(Australia) (United States)	Mal Anderson; Barry MacKay	6; 3	7; 5	3; 6	7; 9	6; 3
2	(Australia) (United States)	Ashley Cooper; Vic Seixas	3; 6	7; 5	6; 1	1; 6	6; 3
3	(Australia) (United States)	Mal Anderson / Mervyn Rose; Barry MacKay / Vic Seixas	6; 4	6; 4	8; 6
4	(Australia) (United States)	Mal Anderson; Vic Seixas	3; 6	6; 4	3; 6	6; 0	11; 13
5	(Australia) (United States)	Ashley Cooper; Barry MacKay	4; 6	6; 1	6; 4	4; 6	3; 6
