= Bob Perry (tennis) =

American tennis player

- Full name: Robert M. Perry
- Country (sports): United States
- Born: March 17, 1933 Los Angeles, California, United States
- Died: October 23, 2023 (aged 90)
- Height: 6 ft 2 in (1.88 m)

Singles
- Career record: 173-120
- Career titles: 8
- Highest ranking: No.18 (1956)

Grand Slam singles results
- Australian Open: 2R (1954)
- French Open: 4R (1956)
- Wimbledon: 4R (1955)
- US Open: 3R (1952, 1955)

Grand Slam doubles results
- Australian Open: QF (1954)
- French Open: W (1956)
- Wimbledon: QF (1955, 1956)

Grand Slam mixed doubles results
- Wimbledon: QF (1958)

Robert 'Bob' Perry (March 17, 1933 – October 23, 2023) was an American male tennis player who was active in the 1950s and 1960s.

== Tennis career ==
Perry started playing tennis in 1944 at age eleven. He won the National 15 and under singles and doubles titles.

Perry won the Germantown Cricket Club Invitation in 1954 at Philadelphia, U.S. defeating Barry MacKay and in the final Herb Flam.

He won the inaugural singles title at the ITF Auckland Championships in 1956, defeating Allan Burns in the final.

Perry reached the final of the 1956 Lebanon International Championships where he lost to Lew Hoad.

Perry won the 1956 Düsseldorf International Championships in July defeating Don Candy in a five set final.

Later in 1956, Perry won the Washington State Championships defeating Noel Brown in the final in a long five-set match.

In 1956 Perry won the doubles title at the French Championships partnering Don Candy. They defeated Ashley Cooper and Lew Hoad in straight sets.

Perry was ranked U.S. No. 6 for 1956 by the USTA, his finest year with three tournament victories in singles.

He won the Blankenberghe, Belgium, tournament in 1958 defeating Jacques Brichant in a close semifinal and Antal Jancsó in the final.

In 1972, after his active playing career had ended, Perry became a tennis coach at the La Jolla Tennis Club where he remained until 1999.

== Grand Slam finals ==
=== Doubles: (1 title) ===
Result	Year	Championship	Surface	Partner	Opponents	Score
Win	1956	French Championships	Clay	(Australia) Don Candy	(Australia) Ashley Cooper (Australia) Lew Hoad	7–5, 6–3, 6–3
