= Mal Anderson =

Australian tennis player (1935–2026)

Mal Anderson MBE
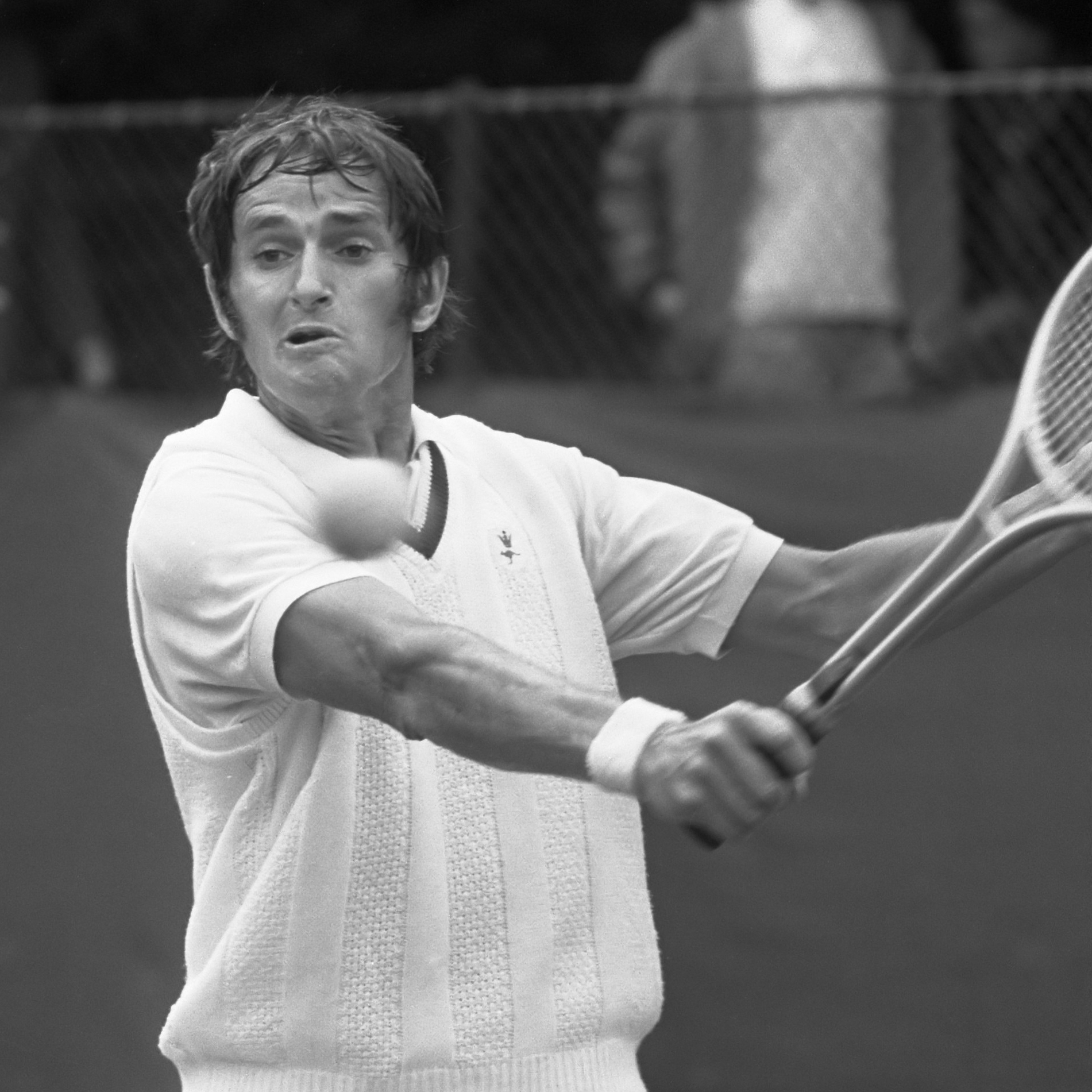
- Anderson in 1972
- Country (sports): Australia
- Born: 3 March 1935 Theodore, Queensland, Australia
- Died: 8 May 2026 (aged 91) Australia
- Turned pro: 1958 (amateur from 1952)
- Retired: 1977
- Plays: Right-handed (one-handed backhand)
- Int. Tennis HoF: 2000 (member page)

Singles
- Career record: 646–446 (59.1%)
- Career titles: 17
- Highest ranking: No. 2 (1957, Adrian Quist)

Grand Slam singles results
- Australian Open: F (1958, 1972)
- French Open: 2R (1957)
- Wimbledon: QF (1956, 1958)
- US Open: W (1957)

Other tournaments
- Professional majors
- US Pro: QF (1959, 1965, 1966)
- Wembley Pro: W (1959)
- French Pro: SF (1962, 1965)
- Other pro events
- TOC: SF (1959^{AUS})

Doubles
- Career record: 53–28
- Career titles: 4

Malcolm James Anderson (3 March 1935 – 8 May 2026) was an Australian tennis player who was active from the mid-1950s to the early 1970s. He won the singles title at the 1957 U.S. National Championships and achieved his highest amateur ranking of world No. 2 in 1957. He became a professional after the 1958 season and won the Wembley World Professional Tennis Championships in the 1959 season. In the Open Era, he was singles runner-up at the 1972 Australian Open.

== Background ==
A right-hander, Anderson started playing tennis when he was eight and became serious about the sport at 16. He was the brother-in-law of fellow Australian tennis star Roy Emerson.

Anderson died on 11 May 2026, at the age of 91.

== Playing career ==
=== Amateur ===
Anderson's two best seasons were 1957 and 1958 when, as an amateur, he twice achieved a ranking of world No. 2.

In 1957, Anderson won the US Championships as an unseeded player. Earlier that year, he had reached the semifinals of the Australian Championships and won the French Championship doubles, partnering with Ashley Cooper, the man he went on to defeat in the final of the 1957 US Championships.

In 1958, Anderson was a finalist at both the Australian Championships and US Championships, losing both times to Cooper.

=== Professional ===
Anderson turned professional in late 1958. He finished fourth in the four-man 1959 World Championship tour behind Pancho Gonzales, Lewis Hoad, and Cooper, although he won five matches against Hoad. In the 1959 Ampol world series of tournaments, Anderson finished tied for sixth place with Segura. At the Forest Hills Tournament of Champions, part of the Ampol series, Anderson lost a close quarterfinal to Hoad. Later in the Ampol series, Anderson won the Wembley Championships, defeating defending champion Frank Sedgman in the quarterfinal, and with close five-set victories over Ken Rosewall in the semifinal and Pancho Segura in the final. Anderson saved match point against Segura before winning. Following the win, Anderson stated that he would retire from pro tennis as soon as he had saved enough money to buy a farm in Australia. At the Sydney White City Tournament of Champions in December, also part of the Ampol series, Anderson reached the semifinal where he lost to Hoad.

He announced his retirement from the pro tour following the 1963 Wembley tournament, citing eyesight problems.

Anderson appeared in another major final in 1972, when at age 36, he was a finalist at the Australian Open, defeating John Newcombe in a long five set quarterfinal, and Metreveli in the semifinal, before losing the final to Ken Rosewall. In that same season, he won the Hong Kong Hardcourt title defeating Geoff Masters in the semifinal and Pancho Gonzales in the final. In 1973, he captured the Australian Open doubles title alongside with John Newcombe. Anderson's last important tournament win was the 1973 New South Wales Championships at Sydney White City (billed as Sydney International), where he defeated in succession Hans Plotz, Phil Dent in five long sets, Colin Dibley in five sets, Newcombe in a close four set semifinal, and Rosewall in the final in three close sets.

He played on four Australian Davis Cup teams, in 1957, 1958, 1972 and 1973, the team winning twice (1957 and 1973).

== Grand Slam finals ==
=== Singles: 4 (1 title, 3 runner-ups) ===
| Result | Year | Championship | Surface | Opponent | Score |
|---|---|---|---|---|---|
| Win | 1957 | U.S. Championships | Grass | (Australia) Ashley Cooper | 10–8, 7–5, 6–4 |
| Loss | 1958 | Australian Championships | Grass | (Australia) Ashley Cooper | 5–7, 3–6, 4–6 |
| Loss | 1958 | U.S. Championships | Grass | (Australia) Ashley Cooper | 2–6, 6–3, 6–4, 8–10, 6–8 |
| Loss | 1972 | Australian Open | Grass | (Australia) Ken Rosewall | 6–7^{(2–7)}, 3–6, 5–7 |

=== Doubles: 3 (2 titles, 1 runner-up) ===
| Result | Year | Championship | Surface | Partner | Opponents | Score |
|---|---|---|---|---|---|---|
| Loss | 1957 | Australian Championships | Grass | (Australia) Ashley Cooper | (Australia) Lew Hoad (Australia) Neale Fraser | 3–6, 6–8, 4–6 |
| Win | 1957 | French Championships | Clay | (Australia) Ashley Cooper | (Australia) Don Candy (Australia) Mervyn Rose | 6–3, 6–0, 6–3 |
| Win | 1973 | Australian Open | Grass | (Australia) John Newcombe | (Australia) John Alexander (Australia) Phil Dent | 6–3, 6–4, 7–6 |

=== Mixed doubles: 1 (1 title) ===
| Result | Year | Championship | Surface | Partner | Opponents | Score |
|---|---|---|---|---|---|---|
| Win | 1957 | Australian Championships | Grass | (Australia) Fay Muller | (Australia) Jill Langley (United Kingdom) Billy Knight | 7–5, 3–6, 6–1 |

=== Pro Slam finals: 1 (1 title) ===
| Result | Year | Championship | Surface | Opponent | Score |
|---|---|---|---|---|---|
| Win | 1959 | Wembley Pro | Indoor | (Ecuador) Pancho Segura | 4–6, 6–4, 3–6, 6–3, 8–6 |

== Singles performance timeline ==
Key
| W | F | SF | QF | #R | RR | Q# | DNQ | A | NH |

(W) winner; (F) finalist; (SF) semifinalist; (QF) quarterfinalist; (#R) rounds 4, 3, 2, 1; (RR) round-robin stage; (Q#) qualification round; (DNQ) did not qualify; (A) absent; (NH) not held; (SR) strike rate (events won / competed); (W–L) win–loss record.

| | 1954 | | 1955 | 1956 | 1957 | 1958 | 1959 | 1960 | 1961 | 1962 | 1963 | 1964 | 1965 | 1966 | 1967 | 1968 | 1969 | 1970 | 1971 | 1972 | 1973 | 1974 | 1975 | 1976 | 1977 | | SR | W–L | Win % |
|---|---|---|---|---|---|---|---|---|---|---|---|---|---|---|---|---|---|---|---|---|---|---|---|---|---|---|---|---|---|
| Grand Slam tournaments | | | | | | | | | | | | | | | | | | | | | | | | | | | 1 / 25 | 51–23 | 68.9 |
| Australian Open | 1R | | 3R | QF | SF | F | A | A | A | 1R | A | A | A | A | A | A | 3R | 1R | 2R | F | 2R | A | A | 3R | A | 1R | 0 / 13 | 19–12 | 61.3 |
| French Open | A | | A | A | 2R | A | A | A | A | A | A | A | A | A | A | A | A | A | A | A | A | A | A | A | A | | 0 / 1 | 1–1 | 50.0 |
| Wimbledon | A | | 1R | QF | 4R | QF | A | A | A | A | A | A | A | A | A | A | 3R | A | A | A | A | A | A | A | A | | 0 / 5 | 13–5 | 72.2 |
| US Open | A | | 3R | 1R | W | F | A | A | A | A | A | A | A | A | A | 3R | A | A | A | 2R | A | A | A | A | A | | 1 / 6 | 18–5 | 78.3 |
| Pro Slam tournaments | | | | | | | | | | | | | | | | | | | | | | | | | | | 1 / 17 | 14–17 | 45.2 |
| U.S. Pro | A | A | A | A | A | A | QF | A | A | A | A | A | QF | QF | 1R | | | | | | | | | | | | 0 / 3 | 2–4 | 33.3 |
| French Pro | NH | | NH | A | NH | A | QF | QF | 1R | SF | QF | A | SF | QF | A | | | | | | | | | | | | 0 / 7 | 7–7 | 50.0 |
| Wembley Pro | NH | | NH | A | A | A | W | 1R | 1R | 1R | QF | A | QF | QF | A | | | | | | | | | | | | 1 / 7 | 5–6 | 45.5 |
| Win–loss | 0–1 | | 3–3 | 6–3 | 14–3 | 14–3 | 5–2 | 1–2 | 0–2 | 2–3 | 1–2 | 0–0 | 3–3 | 2–3 | 0–1 | 1–1 | 4–2 | 0–0 | 1–1 | 6–2 | 0–1 | 0–0 | 0–0 | 2–1 | 0–1 | | 2 / 42 | 65–40 | 61.9 |

Note: The Australian Open was held twice in 1977, in January and December.

== Honours ==
In the 1972 Birthday Honours, Anderson was appointed a Member of the Order of the British Empire (MBE) "for his contribution to lawn tennis".

Anderson was inducted into the International Tennis Hall of Fame in 2000. On 23 August 2000, he was awarded the Australian Sports Medal for his achievements in tennis.

In 2001, Anderson was inducted into the Australian Tennis Hall of Fame. In 2009 he was inducted into the Queensland Sport Hall of Fame. On 6 January 2016, he was named an Icon of Queensland Tennis, and inducted into the Brisbane Tennis Trail, in December 2017, at Tennis Avenue Park, Ashgrove, by the placement of a bench in Tennis Avenue Park in his honour.

Anderson donated the champion cup he won as the 1957 men's singles champion at the US Open to the tennis club where he commenced his career, the Theodore Tennis Club, as part of the town's centenary celebrations in 2022.
