= Luis Ayala (tennis) =

Chilean tennis player (1932–2024)

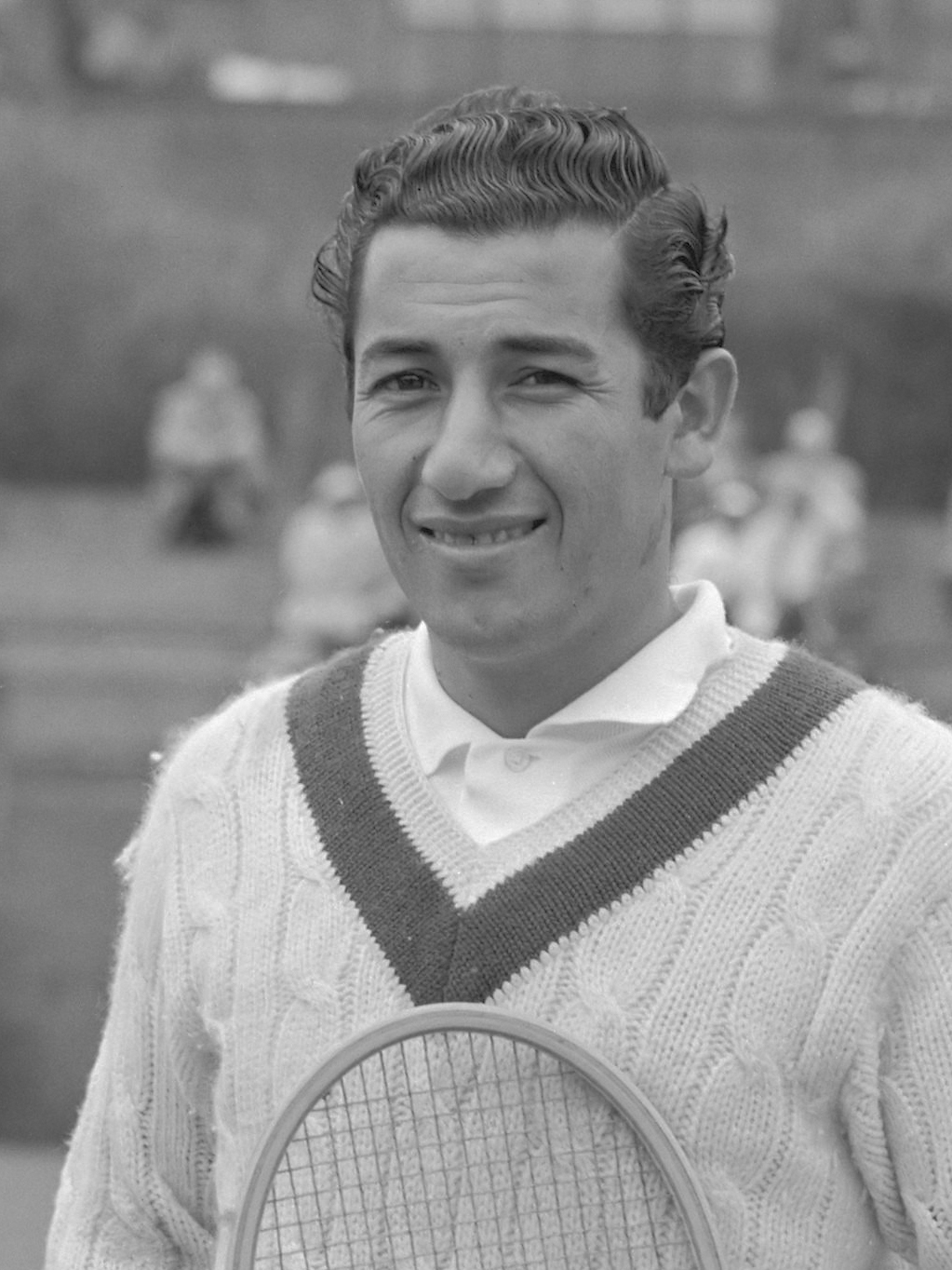
- Ayala in 1956
- Full name: Luis Alberto Ayala
- Country (sports): Chile
- Residence: United States
- Born: 18 September 1932 Santiago, Chile
- Died: 4 September 2024 (aged 91)
- Height: 1.70 m (5 ft 7 in)
- Turned pro: 1961 (amateur from 1950)
- Retired: 1970
- Plays: Right-handed (one-handed backhand)

Singles
- Career record: 626–353 (63.9%)
- Career titles: 43
- Highest ranking: No. 5 (1958, Lance Tingay)

Grand Slam singles results
- French Open: F (1958, 1960)
- Wimbledon: QF (1959, 1960, 1961)
- US Open: QF (1957, 1959)

Other tournaments
- Professional majors
- US Pro: QF (1965, 1966, 1967)
- Wembley Pro: 1R (1961, 1962, 1963, 1964, 1965)
- French Pro: QF (1961, 1965)

Grand Slam doubles results
- French Open: SF (1956)
- Wimbledon: QF (1956, 1959, 1961)
- US Open: 2R (1968, 1969, 1970)

Grand Slam mixed doubles results
- French Open: W (1956)
- Wimbledon: SF (1957)

Luis Alberto Ayala Salinas (18 September 1932 – 4 September 2024) was a Chilean tennis player who competed during the 1950s and 1960s.

== Amateur career ==
Ayala was a two-time singles runner-up at the French Championships. In 1958, as the fifth seed, he reached the final after defeating the top-seeded and world No. 1 player, Ashley Cooper, in the semifinals. However, he was defeated in straight sets by Mervyn Rose in the final. In 1960, Ayala again reached the final, losing in five sets to Nicola Pietrangeli. He won the mixed doubles title at the 1956 French Championships with Thelma Coyne Long.

Ayala secured the gold medal in singles at the 1959 Pan American Games in Chicago, defeating Canadian player Robert Bédard in the final.

He claimed the prestigious singles title at the Italian Open in 1959, overcoming Nicola Pietrangeli in the semifinals and Neale Fraser in the final, both in four sets. The following year, he reached the final again but was defeated in five sets by Barry MacKay.

Ayala won the 1960 Argentina International Tennis Championships in Buenos Aires, defeating Ron Holmberg in the semifinals and Manuel Santana in the final. This was his third Argentina title, having previously won in 1955 (defeating Art Larsen) and 1957 (defeating Enrique Morea).

In 1960, Ayala also won the Madrid Championships, defeating Andrés Gimeno in the final. In 1961, he won the Hanover Championships, overcoming Ramanathan Krishnan in the final.

== Professional career ==
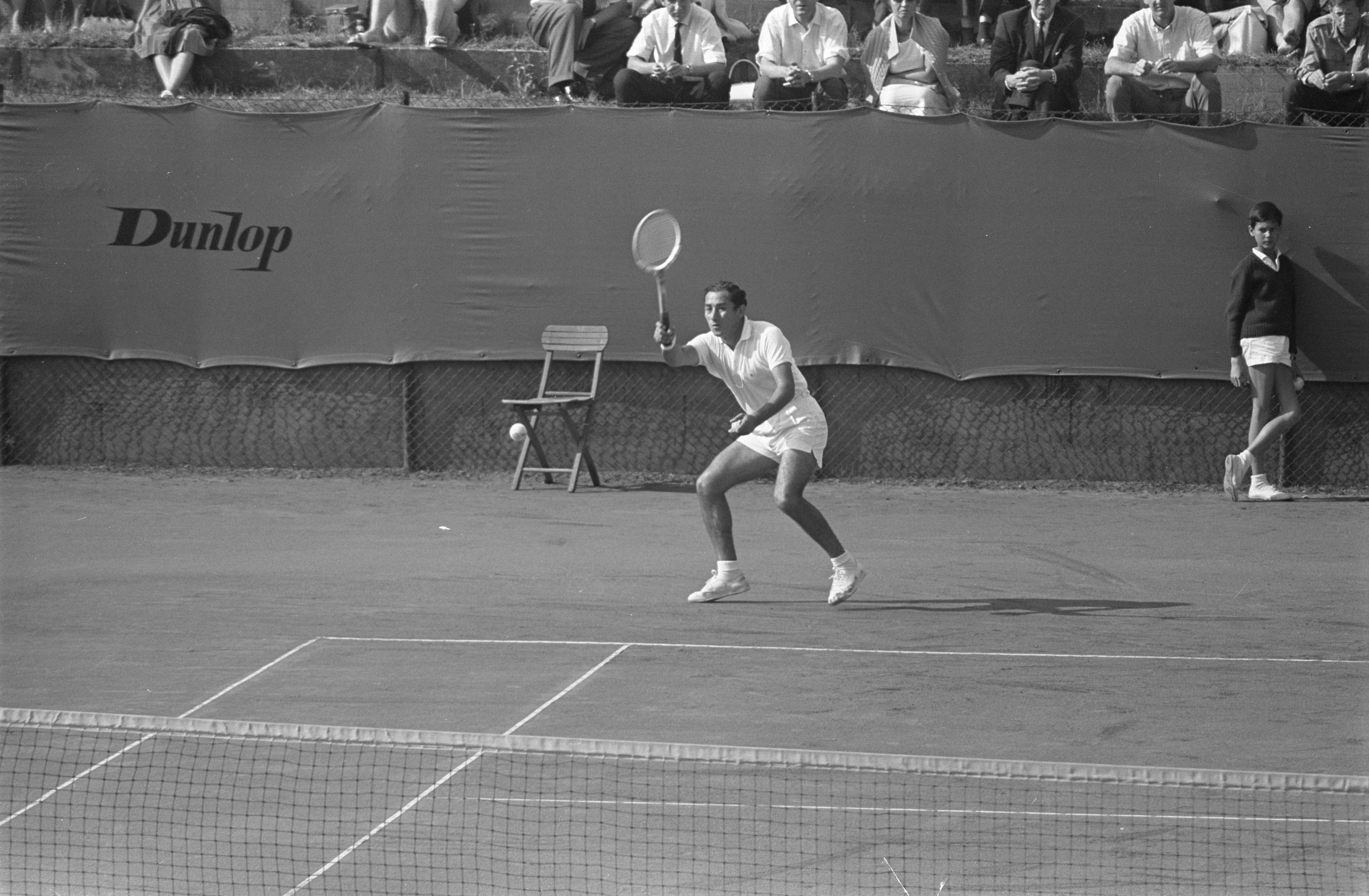
Luis Ayala in 1964.

In 1961, Ayala turned professional and joined Jack Kramer's tour.

In 1964, he won the La Baule Professional Championships on clay, defeating Rod Laver in the semifinals and Lew Hoad in the final.

After retiring from professional play, Ayala became a tennis professional at the River Oaks Country Club in Houston, Texas. He later served as the director of tennis at the Forest Club in Houston.

=== Davis Cup ===
Ayala represented Chile in the Davis Cup from 1952 to 1960, participating in 18 ties and compiling a record of 37 wins and 14 losses. His most notable performance came in 1955 when Chile reached the semifinals of the Europe Zone, where they were defeated by Sweden despite Ayala winning both of his singles matches against Lennart Bergelin and Sven Davidson.

== Death ==
Ayala died on 4 September 2024, at the age of 91.

== Ranking ==
Ayala was consistently ranked among the world's top ten tennis players by both Ned Potter and Lance Tingay between 1956 and 1961. Tingay of The Daily Telegraph ranked him as world No. 5 in 1958, and he was ranked No. 6 in 1959, No. 7 in 1960, and No. 7 again in 1961.

== Grand Slam finals ==
=== Singles (2 runners-up) ===
Result	Year	Championship	Surface	Opponents	Score
Loss	1958	French Championships	Clay	(Australia) Mervyn Rose	3–6, 4–6, 4–6
Loss	1960	French Championships	Clay	(Italy) Nicola Pietrangeli	6–3, 3–6, 4–6, 6–4, 3–6

=== Mixed doubles: (1 title, 1 runner-up) ===
Result	Year	Championship	Surface	Partner	Opponents	Score
Loss	1955	French Championships	Clay	(Australia) Jenny Staley Hoad	(United States) Darlene Hard (South Africa) Gordon Forbes	7–5, 1–6, 2–6
Win	1956	French Championships	Clay	(Australia) Thelma Coyne Long	(United States) Doris Hart (Australia) Bob Howe	4–6, 6–4, 6–1
