= Angela Mortimer =

British tennis player (1932–2025)

Angela Mortimer MBE
- Full name: Florence Angela Margaret Mortimer Barrett
- Country (sports): (United Kingdom) Great Britain
- Born: 21 April 1932 Plymouth, Devon, England
- Died: 25 August 2025 (aged 93) London, England
- Int. Tennis HoF: 1993 (member page)

Singles
- Career record: 603-90 (87%)
- Career titles: 108
- Highest ranking: No. 1 (1961, Lance Tingay)

Grand Slam singles results
- Australian Open: W (1958)
- French Open: W (1955)
- Wimbledon: W (1961)
- US Open: SF (1961)

Doubles

Grand Slam doubles results
- Australian Open: F (1958)
- Wimbledon: W (1955)

Grand Slam mixed doubles results
- Australian Open: F (1958)

Team competitions
- Wightman Cup: W (1960)

Florence Angela Margaret Mortimer-Barrett (née Mortimer; 21 April 1932 – 25 August 2025) was a British world No. 1 tennis player. Mortimer won three major singles titles: the 1955 French Championships, the 1958 Australian Championships and 1961 Wimbledon Championships, the last won when she was partially deaf.

Mortimer also partnered with Anne Shilcock to win the women's doubles title at Wimbledon in 1955. She and Lorraine Coghlan also reached the women's doubles final at the 1958 Australian Championships. Mortimer and Peter Newman reached the mixed doubles final at the 1958 Australian Championships, her only mixed doubles final at a major.

Mortimer was married to the retired player and broadcaster John Barrett. She died in 2025.

== Biography ==
Angela Mortimer was born on 21 April 1932 in Plymouth, England.

Mortimer reached the quarterfinals of the US National Championships, then lost to second seed Doris Hart. At Wimbledon in 1953, seeded no. 5, she reached the quarterfinals, losing to Dorothy Knode. She also reached the quarterfinals in 1954, 1956 (losing to countrywoman Pat Ward Hales), 1959 (when she was seeded no. 2 but lost to Sandra Reynolds), and 1960 (losing to champion Maria Bueno). At Wimbledon in 1958, unseeded, she beat former champion Margaret Osborne duPont in the quarterfinals, then French champion Zsuzsa Körmöczy in the semifinals, and lost the final against the defending champion Althea Gibson in straight sets. In 1961, she won the title, defeating top-seeded Sandra Reynolds in the semifinals and then Christine Truman in the final in three sets, making her the first British winner of the women's title since Dorothy Round in 1937. Not fully fit in 1962, she lost to eventual finalist Vera Suková in the fourth round.

In 1955, she was the first British woman since 1937 to win a major tournament when she defeated Dorothy Knode in the final of the French Championships. During the long final set, she has said that she was given new heart when she heard her opponent asking for a brandy on court. Defending her title the following year, she reached the final, losing to Althea Gibson in two sets. During 1956 she contracted amoebic dysentery in Egypt and did not return to full form until 1958.

She won the Australian title in 1958 while still recuperating, defeating Lorraine Coghlan in the final. Her best result in the U.S. Championships was in 1961 when she reached the semifinals, losing to Ann Haydon. She made her farewell in the Torquay Open Lawn Tennis Tournament of 1962, beating Ann Haydon-Jones in the final.

Her game was played mainly from the baseline, as described in her tennis autobiography My Waiting Game. She always played in shorts, and refused designer Teddy Tinling's offer to design dresses for her. He responded by designing shorts, and later she joined his staff.

According to Lance Tingay, Mortimer was ranked in the world top 10 from 1953 through 1956 and from 1958 through 1962, reaching a career high of world No. 1 in 1961.

Addressing how her deafness affected her play, as the ability to hear the ball coming off the racket strings is an aid to most, she told the International Tennis Hall of Fame website "It helped me concentrate, shutting out distractions."

Mortimer was appointed Member of the Order of the British Empire (MBE) for services to Lawn Tennis in the 1967 New Year Honours. She was inducted into the International Tennis Hall of Fame in 1993, joined by her husband John Barrett in 2014. The only other married couple in the Hall is Steffi Graf and Andre Agassi. In 2004 Mortimer was one of five British Wimbledon women's singles champions honoured by a bust unveiled outside Centre Court. The busts were sculpted in bronze by Ian Rank-Broadley.

On 27 July 2014, she received the Freedom of the Borough of Merton.

== Death ==
Mortimer died from cancer in London on 25 August 2025, at the age of 93. She and John had two children, Michael and Sarah Jane.

== Grand Slam finals ==
=== Singles: 5 (3 titles, 2 runners-up) ===
Result	Year	Championship	Surface	Opponent	Score
Win	1955	French Championships	Clay	(United States) Dorothy Head Knode	2–6, 7–5, 10–8
Loss	1956	French Championships	Clay	(United States) Althea Gibson	0–6, 10–12
Win	1958	Australian Championships	Grass	(Australia) Lorraine Coghlan	6–3, 6–4
Loss	1958	Wimbledon	Grass	(United States) Althea Gibson	6–8, 2–6
Win	1961	Wimbledon	Grass	(United Kingdom) Christine Truman	4–6, 6–4, 7–5

=== Doubles: 2 (1 title, 1 runner-up) ===
Result	Year	Championship	Surface	Partner	Opponents	Score
Win	1955	Wimbledon	Grass	(United Kingdom) Anne Shilcock	(United Kingdom) Shirley Bloomer (United Kingdom) Patricia Ward Hales	7–5, 6–1
Loss	1958	Australian Championships	Grass	(Australia) Lorraine Coghlan	(Australia) Mary Bevis Hawton (Australia) Thelma Coyne Long	5–7, 8–6, 2–6

=== Mixed Doubles: 1 (1 runner-up) ===
Result	Year	Championship	Surface	Partner	Opponents	Score
Loss	1958	Australian Championships	Grass	(Australia) Peter Newman	(Australia) Mary Bevis Hawton (Australia) Bob Howe	11–9, 1–6, 2–6

== Grand Slam singles tournament timeline ==
Key
W	F	SF	QF	#R	RR	Q#	DNQ	A	NH

(W) winner; (F) finalist; (SF) semifinalist; (QF) quarterfinalist; (#R) rounds 4, 3, 2, 1; (RR) round-robin stage; (Q#) qualification round; (DNQ) did not qualify; (A) absent; (NH) not held; (SR) strike rate (events won / competed); (W–L) win–loss record.

Tournament	1951	1952	1953	1954	1955	1956	1957	1958	1959	1960	1961	1962	Career SR
Australia	A	A	A	A	A	A	A	W	A	A	A	A	1 / 1
France	A	A	3R	A	W	F	A	A	A	A	A	A	1 / 3
Wimbledon	2R	3R	QF	QF	2R	QF	3R	F	QF	QF	W	4R	1 / 12
United States	A	QF	3R	A	1R	A	A	A	1R	A	SF	A	0 / 5
SR	0 / 1	0 / 2	0 / 3	0 / 1	1 / 3	0 / 2	0 / 1	1 / 2	0 / 2	0 / 1	1 / 2	0 / 1	3 / 21

== See also ==
- Performance timelines for all female tennis players since 1978 who reached at least one Grand Slam final
