= Robert Howe (tennis) =

Australian tennis player

Bob Howe
- Full name: Robert Neville Howe
- Country (sports): Australia
- Born: 3 August 1925 Sydney, NSW, Australia
- Died: 30 November 2004 (aged 79) Santa Ana, California, US
- Height: 1.77 m (5 ft 10 in)
- Turned pro: 1968 (amateur from 1949)
- Retired: 1971
- Plays: Right-handed (two-handed backhand)

Singles
- Career record: 500-369
- Career titles: 29

Grand Slam singles results
- Australian Open: QF (1958, 1963)
- French Open: 3R (1957)
- Wimbledon: 4R (1956, 1962, 1965)
- US Open: 4R (1957)

Doubles
- Career record: 208–94
- Career titles: 18
- Highest ranking: No. 12 (30 August 1977)

Grand Slam doubles results
- Australian Open: F (1959)
- French Open: F (1958, 1961)
- Wimbledon: SF (1956, 1957)

Grand Slam mixed doubles results
- Australian Open: W (1958)
- French Open: W (1960, 1962)
- Wimbledon: W (1958)

Robert (Bob) Howe (3 August 1925 – 30 November 2004) was an Australian tennis player. Although he won 29 singles titles, his main successes were achieved in the doubles competition. He won four mixed doubles Grand Slam titles, including the Wimbledon mixed doubles championship in 1958.

== Career ==
In singles play, Howe won the 1954 London Hard Court Championships on clay at The Hurlingham Club defeating Gordon Forbes in the final.

He won the ILTF Surrey Hard Court Championships on clay in 1956 and 1962.

In 1963 he won the Nottingham Open on grass defeating Pierre Barthès in the semifinal and Tony Pickard in the final.

== Grand Slam finals ==
=== Doubles (3 runner-ups) ===
Result	Year	Championship	Surface	Partner	Opponents	Score
Loss	1958	French Championships	Clay	(South Africa) Abe Segal	(Australia) Ashley Cooper (Australia) Neale Fraser	6–3, 6–8, 3–6, 5–7
Loss	1959	Australian Championships	Grass	(Australia) Don Candy	(Australia) Rod Laver (Australia) Bob Mark	7–9, 4–6, 2–6
Loss	1961	French Championships	Clay	(Australia) Bob Mark	(Australia) Roy Emerson (Australia) Rod Laver	6–3, 1–6, 1–6, 4–6

=== Mixed doubles (4 titles, 4 runner-ups) ===
Result	Year	Championship	Surface	Partner	Opponents	Score
Loss	1956	French Championships	Clay	(United States) Darlene Hard	(Australia) Thelma Coyne Long (Chile) Luis Ayala	6–4, 4–6, 1–6
Win	1958	Australian Championships	Grass	(Australia) Mary Bevis Hawton	(United Kingdom) Angela Mortimer (United Kingdom) Peter Newman	9–11, 6–1, 6–2
Loss	1958	French Championships	Clay	(Australia) Lorraine Coghlan	(United Kingdom) Shirley Bloomer (Italy) Nicola Pietrangeli	6–8, 2–6
Win	1958	Wimbledon	Grass	(Australia) Lorraine Coghlan	(United States) Althea Gibson (Denmark) Kurt Nielsen	6–3, 13–11
Win	1960	French Championships	Clay	(Brazil) Maria Bueno	(United Kingdom) Ann Haydon-Jones (Australia) Roy Emerson	1–6, 6–1, 6–2
Lost	1960	Wimbledon	Grass	(Brazil) Maria Bueno	(United States) Darlene Hard (Australia) Rod Laver	11–13, 6–3, 6–8
Loss	1961	Wimbledon	Grass	(West Germany) Edda Buding	(Australia) Fred Stolle (Australia) Lesley Turner	9–11, 2–6
Win	1962	French Championships	Clay	(South Africa) Renée Schuurman	(Australia) Lesley Turner (Australia) Fred Stolle	3–6, 6–4, 6–4
