= Rafael Nadal =

Spanish tennis player (born 1986)

The Most Excellent Rafael Nadal
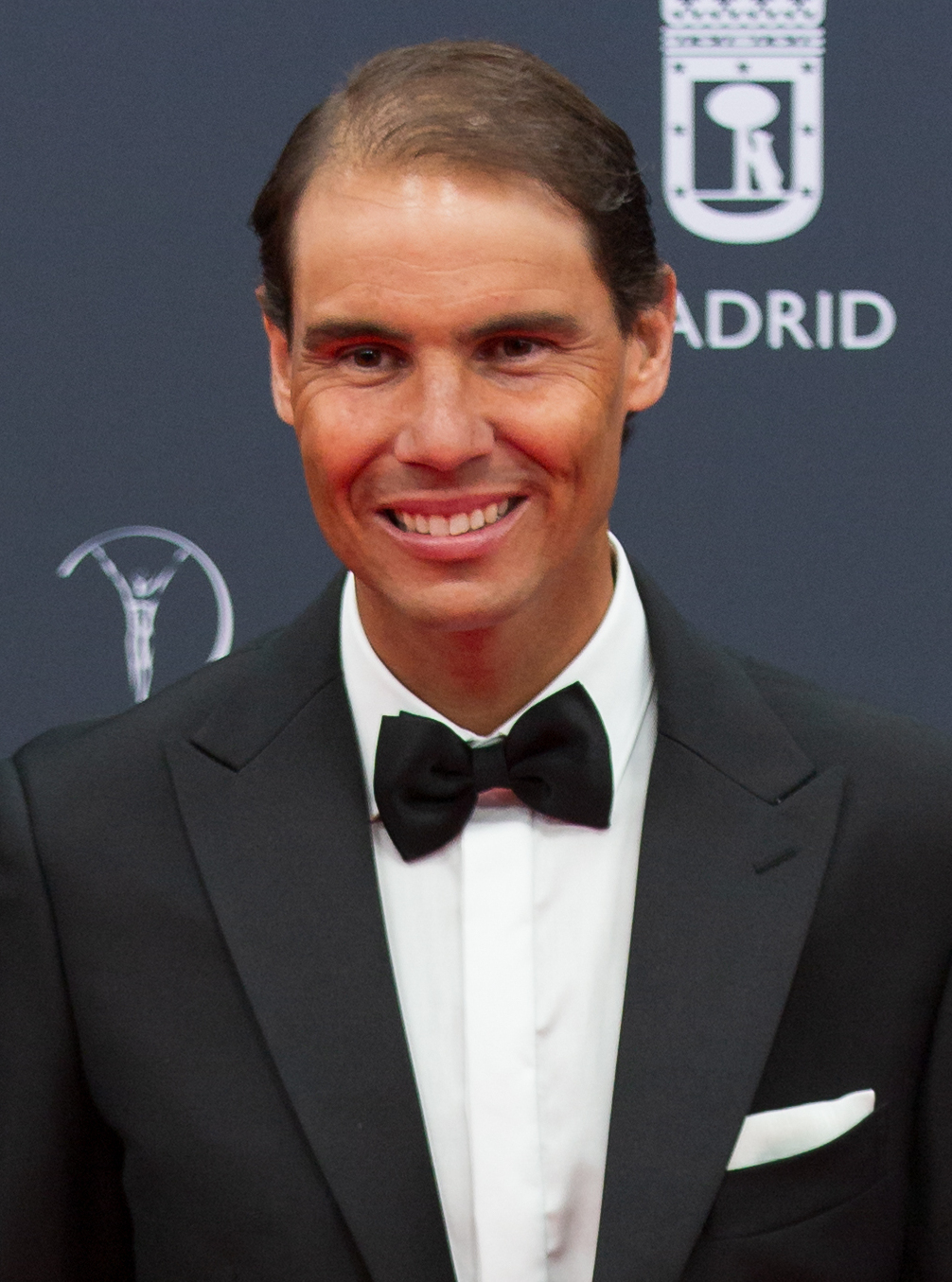
- Nadal in 2024
- Full name: Rafael Nadal Parera
- Country (sports): Spain
- Residence: Porto Cristo, Mallorca, Spain
- Born: 3 June 1986 (age 40) Manacor, Mallorca, Spain
- Height: 1.85 m (6 ft 1 in)
- Turned pro: 2001
- Retired: 19 November 2024
- Plays: Left-handed (two-handed backhand)
- Prize money: US$134,946,100: 2nd all-time in earnings
- Official website: rafaelnadal.com

Singles
- Career record: 1080–228 (82.6%)
- Career titles: 92 (5th in the Open Era)
- Highest ranking: No. 1 (18 August 2008)

Grand Slam singles results
- Australian Open: W (2009, 2022)
- French Open: W (2005, 2006, 2007, 2008, 2010, 2011, 2012, 2013, 2014, 2017, 2018, 2019, 2020, 2022)
- Wimbledon: W (2008, 2010)
- US Open: W (2010, 2013, 2017, 2019)

Other tournaments
- Tour Finals: F (2010, 2013)
- Olympic Games: W (2008)

Doubles
- Career record: 142–77 (64.8%)
- Career titles: 11
- Highest ranking: No. 26 (8 August 2005)

Grand Slam doubles results
- Australian Open: 3R (2004, 2005)
- Wimbledon: 2R (2005)
- US Open: SF (2004)

Other doubles tournaments
- Olympic Games: W (2016)

Team competitions
- Davis Cup: W (2004, 2008, 2009, 2011, 2019)

Medal record
Representing Spain
Olympic Games
| Gold medal – first place | 2008 Beijing | Singles |
| Gold medal – first place | 2016 Rio de Janeiro | Doubles |

Excmo. Sr. D. Rafael "Rafa" Nadal Parera, (Note: Catalan: [rəf(ə)ˈɛl nəˈðal pəˈɾeɾə]; Spanish: [rafaˈel naˈðal paˈɾeɾa]) 1st Marquess of Llevant de Mallorca (born 3 June 1986) is a Spanish former professional tennis player. He was ranked as the world No. 1 in men's singles by the Association of Tennis Professionals (ATP) for 209 weeks, and finished as the year-end No. 1 five times. Nadal won 92 ATP Tour–level singles titles, with 22 major titles—including a record 14 French Open titles—as well as 36 Masters titles and two Olympic gold medals. Nadal is one of three men to complete the career Golden Slam in singles. (Note: The others are Andre Agassi and Novak Djokovic.) His 81 consecutive wins on clay constitute the longest single-surface win streak in the Open Era.

For nearly two decades, Nadal was a leading figure in men's tennis, alongside Roger Federer and Novak Djokovic, collectively known as the Big Three, and including Andy Murray, the Big Four, creating what has been called a Golden Era of men's tennis. Early in his career, Nadal became one of the most successful teenagers in ATP Tour history, reaching No. 2 in the world and winning 16 titles before turning 20, including his first major title at the 2005 French Open. Nadal became the world No. 1 for the first time in 2008 after defeating Federer in a historic Wimbledon final, his first major championship off clay, which he followed with an Olympic singles gold at the 2008 Beijing Olympics. By defeating Djokovic in the 2010 US Open final, Nadal became the then–youngest man in the Open Era to complete a career Grand Slam at age 24, and the first man to win majors on three different surfaces in the same year.

Nadal won major singles titles in ten consecutive years from 2005 to 2014, and again in a four-year span from 2017 to 2020. He also won 11 doubles titles during his career, including an Olympic gold medal at the 2016 Rio Olympics. At the 2022 Australian Open, Nadal surpassed his joint record with Djokovic and Federer for the most major men's singles titles, and became one of four men in history to complete the double career Grand Slam in singles. Nadal retired from the sport after playing for Spain in the 2024 Davis Cup Finals.

As a left-handed player, one of Nadal's main strengths was his forehand, delivered with heavy topspin. He frequently ranked among the tour leaders in return games, return points, and break points won. His game was especially well-suited for clay courts, on which came 63 of his 92 singles titles. Nadal won the Stefan Edberg Sportsmanship Award five times and was the Laureus World Sportsman of the Year in 2011 and 2021. He was named one of Time's 100 most influential people in the world twice in 2009 and 2022, and was created Marquess of Llevant de Mallorca in 2025 by King Felipe VI of Spain. Representing Spain, Nadal won two Olympic gold medals, and led the nation to five Davis Cup titles. Nadal has also opened a tennis academy in his hometown of Manacor, Mallorca, and is an active philanthropist.

== Early life ==
Rafael Nadal Parera was born on 3 June 1986 in Manacor on the island of Mallorca, Spain, to Ana María Parera Femenías and Sebastián Nadal Homar. His father is a businessman who owns an insurance company, a glass and window company, and a restaurant. His mother owned a perfume shop but gave it up to raise Nadal and his younger sister, María Isabel. One of his uncles, Miguel Ángel Nadal, is a retired professional footballer who played for RCD Mallorca, FC Barcelona, and the Spanish national team. As a child, he idolized Ronaldo, and was given access through his uncle to the Barcelona team dressing room to have a photo taken with the Brazilian. Another uncle, tennis coach Toni Nadal, introduced him to tennis when he was three years old.

Nadal started to play tennis at the Manacor Tennis Club, where Toni worked as a coach, hitting his first few shots with his uncle. At this stage Nadal's passion was football, which he often played on the streets of Manacor with his friends. He began to play tennis more regularly when he was five. Toni quickly realized that his young nephew had both the passion and talent to be a serious player. Nadal often played tennis in a group, but Toni singled him out during sessions, shouting at him instead of the other kids, and making him pick up the balls and sweep the courts. In his 2011 autobiography, he admitted fearing Toni and dreading solo practice sessions with him. Nadal admitted he sometimes returned home from tennis lessons crying.

At age 8, Nadal won an under-12 regional tennis championship while also being a promising football player. This victory inspired Toni to train Nadal more intensively. After studying Nadal's two-handed forehand, Toni encouraged him to play left-handed for a natural advantage on the tennis court. The transition was purportedly difficult for Nadal, but he was coached through the change by his uncle, who instructed him to try it for 20 minutes per day before gradually increasing that time until he was fully adjusted.

== Career ==
=== 1997–2000: Juniors ===
Nadal won the Spanish junior championships in 1997 and 1998, beating Ricardo Villacorta and Marcel Granollers respectively. In 1998 Nadal reached the final of the U14 Spanish championship at the age of 12, a feat that remains unmatched, losing to Juan Sanchez de Luna in straight sets. In late 1998, Nadal won the season-ending U12 Junior Masters at Stuttgart, beating future world No. 5 Kevin Anderson in the final.

In February 1998, Nadal competed outside Spain for the first time and won the Open Super 12, an unofficial world championship for U12 players in Auray. He beat 1997 winner Jamie Murray in the final. At the time, Nadal was torn between football and tennis, partly because his uncle Miguel Ángel was preparing to compete in the 1998 FIFA World Cup with Spain. Nadal said winning the Auray tournament helped him make the decision to "opt for tennis and try an international career". In 1998, when Nadal was runner-up in the U14 event Spanish championship, he was still playing football. Nadal's father insisted he choose between football and tennis to so his schoolwork wouldn't suffer, leading Nadal to quit football.

In 1999, the 12-year-old Nadal was playing in the U14 circuit of the ETA Junior Tour (now the Tennis Europe Junior Tour), winning the Tim Essonne, and finishing the year at No. 69. In 2000, Nadal dominated the U14 circuit, winning Les Petits As in Tarbes, beating Julien Gely in the final, and the European Junior Masters in Prato. On the day he turned 14, Nadal won the Sport Goofy Trophy in Getxo, beating Granollers in the final. In July, Nadal won the U14 Spanish championships, beating his friend and training partner Tomeu Salvá in the final, despite breaking a finger on his left hand during the first round. As a member of the Spanish national team, Nadal won the 2000 ITF World Junior Championship for players under 14, winning his matches in both singles and doubles (paired with Marcel Granollers) in a 3–0 win over Russia. Nadal ended 2000 at No. 5 of the ETA rankings for U14s.

His junior results secured Nadal a tennis scholarship in Barcelona, and the Spanish tennis federation requested that Nadal move to Barcelona to continue his tennis training. His family turned down this request, partly because they feared his education would suffer, but also because Toni said, "I don't want to believe that you have to go to America or other places to be a good athlete. You can do it from your home." Nadal already was by then practicing three times a week at Palma with former World No. 1 Carlos Moyá, who later became Nadal's mentor and confidant, and whom Nadal beat in 2000, at the time still a Top-10 player, in an exhibition match. The decision to stay home meant less financial support from the federation; instead, Nadal's father covered the costs.

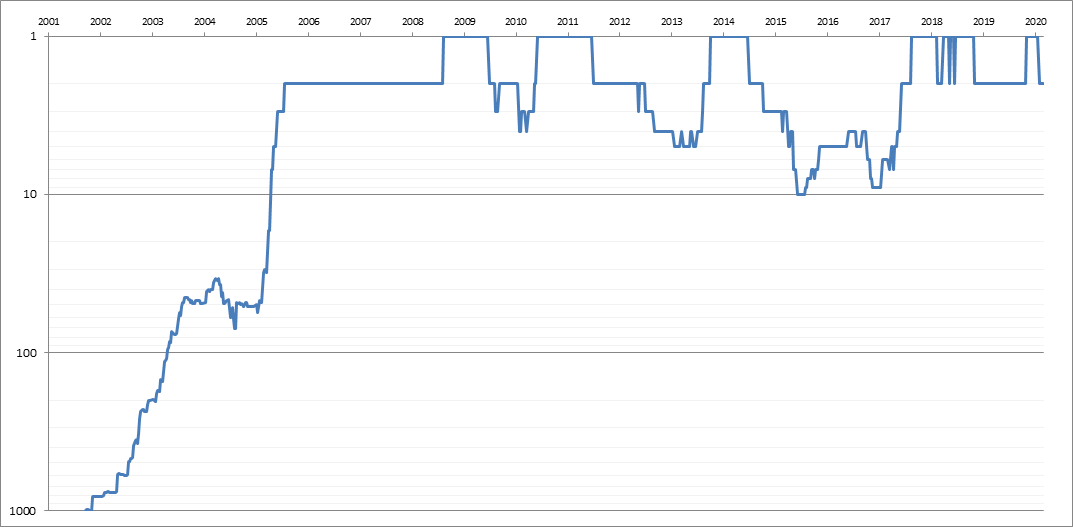
Rafael Nadal singles-ranking history chart through January 2020

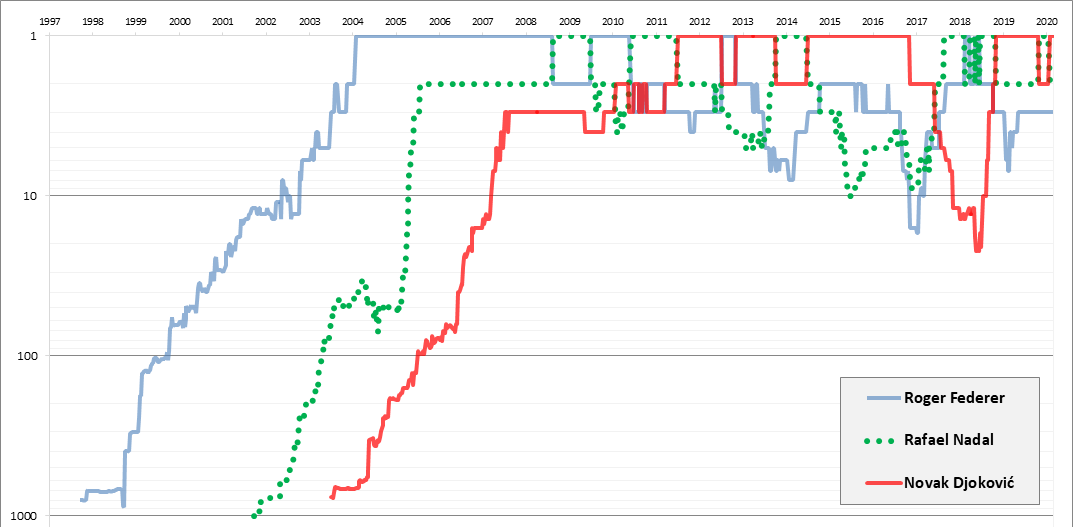
Singles ranking composite history chart through January 2020 (Roger Federer, Rafael Nadal, Novak Djokovic)

=== 2001–2002: Pro debut ===
Nadal turned professional at the beginning of 2001, at the age of 14. He reached the semi-finals of the junior singles event at Wimbledon and helped Spain defeat the US in the final of the Junior Davis Cup.

In early 2001, aged 14, Nadal began playing the qualifying draws of professional tournaments. In May 2001, he defeated former Grand Slam tournament champion Pat Cash in a clay-court exhibition match. Nadal made his pro debut in the main draw at the Futures in Madrid on 11 September 2001, wasting 13 match points against Guillermo Platel-Varas in the opening round. He received a wild card into the main draw of the Challenger in Seville, his first Challenger tournament, and beat world No. 751 Israel Matos Gil 6–4 6–4 to claim his first pro win and earn the first five ATP points of his career to become world No. 1002. At age 15, Nadal ended 2001 as the world No. 811.

In 2002, Nadal, then ranked No. 762, received a wild card to the ATP 250 event on his home island of Mallorca, where on 29 April, Nadal won his first ATP match by defeating No. 81 Ramón Delgado, and became the ninth player in the Open Era to do so before the age of 16. He did not compete for two months as he studied for school exams and missed the junior French Open in June. At junior Wimbledon, he reached the semi-finals before losing to Lamine Ouahab. Nadal then won six of the nine Futures events he entered from July until December, including 5 on clay and 1 on hard courts. Nadal finished 2002 with a Futures record of 40–9 in singles and 10–9 in doubles. In October, Nadal defeated No. 76 Albert Montañés in the quarterfinals of a Challenger at Barcelona, before losing to Albert Portas in the semi-finals. Nadal ended 2002 as the world No. 199.

=== 2003: First ATP title, ascend to the top 50 ===
Nadal continued his ascent in early 2003, reaching the finals of Challengers at Hamburg, Cherbourg and Cagliari, and winning at Barletta. He scored a total of 19 Challenger wins in the first three months of the season to find himself inside the Top 150. He then qualified for his second career ATP event, the Monte Carlo Masters, where in the second round he beat the 2002 French Open champion Albert Costa, then ranked No. 7 (his first top 10 career win) and he entered the world's top 100. Nadal reached his fifth Challenger final of the year in Aix-en-Provence, which he lost to Mariano Puerta. In May, 16-year-old Nadal entered his second Masters event at Hamburg, where he upset No. 4 Carlos Moyá before losing to future French Open Champion Gaston Gaudio in round three. Nadal postponed his French Open debut after injuring his elbow in a fall while training. He then qualified directly to Wimbledon, having never contested in a major qualifying event before. In his major main draw debut in Wimbledon, Nadal defeated Mario Ančić, and reached the third round to become the youngest man to do so since Boris Becker in 1984.

At Umag, Nadal lost to Moyá in the semi-finals. This was Nadal's only loss at a clay-court semi-final for the next 12 years, as he then began a streak of 52 consecutive wins in semi-final matches on clay that ended at the 2015 Rio Open. Nadal won his first ATP title (doubles or singles) at Umag, partnering Álex López Morón to beat Todd Perry and Thomas Shimada in the final. Nadal won his second Challenger title of the year in August at Segovia, thus entering the top 50 and winning the ATP Newcomer of the Year Award.

At the US Open, Nadal lost in round two to Younes El Aynaoui. In September, Nadal entered the final Challenger event of his career, on hard courts in Saint-Jean-de-Luz, retiring with an injury against Richard Gasquet, who never defeated Nadal again. Nadal finished the year ranked as the world No. 49.

=== 2004: Davis Cup title ===
Nadal won Chennai Open doubles, with Tommy Robredo defeating Jonathan Erlich and Andy Ram in the final; Nadal's second doubles title and first on hard courts. In singles, Nadal had his 5th consecutive loss after a first round exit to Thierry Ascione; this remains the worst losing streak of his career. At Auckland he reached the first ATP final of his career, which he lost to Dominik Hrbatý. Nadal reached the third round of the Australian Open, where he lost in straight sets to former world No. 1 Lleyton Hewitt. Ranked No. 34, Nadal faced No. 1 Roger Federer for the first time in the third round of the Miami Open, winning in straight sets before losing to Fernando González in the fourth round.

At Estoril, Nadal suffered a stress fracture in his left ankle during his round of 16 victory over Richard Gasquet, causing him to miss 3 months of play, the French Open, and Wimbledon. He won his first ATP singles title at the Prokom Open by defeating No. 105 José Acasuso in the final, but won hardly any other match on the tour. At the US Open, Nadal lost to defending champion Andy Roddick in the second round. In the doubles he and Robredo upset the No. 4 seeds in the third round and reached the semi-finals; Nadal's best performance in a grand slam doubles event.

In the 2004 Davis Cup final, 18-year-old Nadal beat world No. 2 Andy Roddick on clay in Spain to help his nation clinch the title over the United States. In doing so at 18 years and six months of age, he became the youngest player to register a singles victory in a Davis Cup final for a winning nation. Nadal finished the year ranked No. 51, mainly because he missed most of the clay court season.

=== 2005: French Open champion ===
2005 started with a doubles title alongside Albert Costa at the Qatar Open, defeating Andrei Pavel and Mikhail Youzhny in the final. At the 2005 Australian Open, Nadal lost in the fourth round to eventual runner-up Lleyton Hewitt. Two months later, he reached the final of the 2005 Miami Masters, but was defeated by No. 1 Roger Federer.

He dominated the spring clay-court season. He won 24 consecutive singles matches, breaking Andre Agassi's Open Era record of consecutive match wins for a male teenager. Nadal won the Torneo Conde de Godó in Barcelona defeating the former world No. 1 Juan Carlos Ferrero in the final; which meant he was ranked in the top 10 for the first time in his career. He then beat 2004 French Open runner-up Guillermo Coria in the finals of the 2005 Monte Carlo Masters and the 2005 Italian Open. These victories raised his ranking to world No. 5 and made him one of the favorites at his career-first French Open. On his 19th birthday, Nadal defeated Federer in the French Open semi-finals, being one of only four players to defeat him that year. Then he defeated Mariano Puerta in the final, becoming the second man to win the French Open on his first attempt. He also became the first male teenager to win a major singles title since Pete Sampras won the 1990 US Open at age 19. His ranking rose to No. 3.

Three days later, Nadal's 24-match winning streak was snapped in the first round on grass at Halle, Germany, where he lost to No. 147 Alexander Waske. He then lost in the second round of 2005 Wimbledon to No. 69 Gilles Müller. Following his Wimbledon loss, Nadal won 16 consecutive matches and three consecutive tournaments, the Swedish Open, Stuttgart Open, and the Canada Masters, defeating Agassi in the final of the latter to win the first hardcourt title of his career and to bring his ranking to No. 2 on 25 July 2005, where he remained for the next three years behind Roger Federer. His winning streak ended in the first round of the Cincinnati Open at the hands of Tomáš Berdych. Nadal was seeded second at the 2005 US Open, but was upset in the third round by No. 49 James Blake.

In September, he defeated Coria in the final of the China Open in Beijing and won both of his Davis Cup matches against Italy. In October, he won his fourth Masters title of the year, against Ivan Ljubičić at the 2005 Madrid Masters, his biggest indoor title to this day. A foot injury prevented him from competing in the year-ending Tennis Masters Cup.

Nadal (with 11 titles) broke Mats Wilander's previous teenage season record of nine in 1983. Nadal was awarded ATP Most Improved Player of the Year award.

=== 2006: Back-to-back French Open titles ===
Nadal missed the Australian Open because of a foot injury. In February, he lost in the semi-finals of Marseille. Two weeks later, he handed Roger Federer his first loss of the year in the final of the Dubai Open, ending Federer's 56-match hard court winning streak. Nadal was then upset in the semi-finals of Indian Wells by James Blake, and in the second round of Miami by Carlos Moyá.

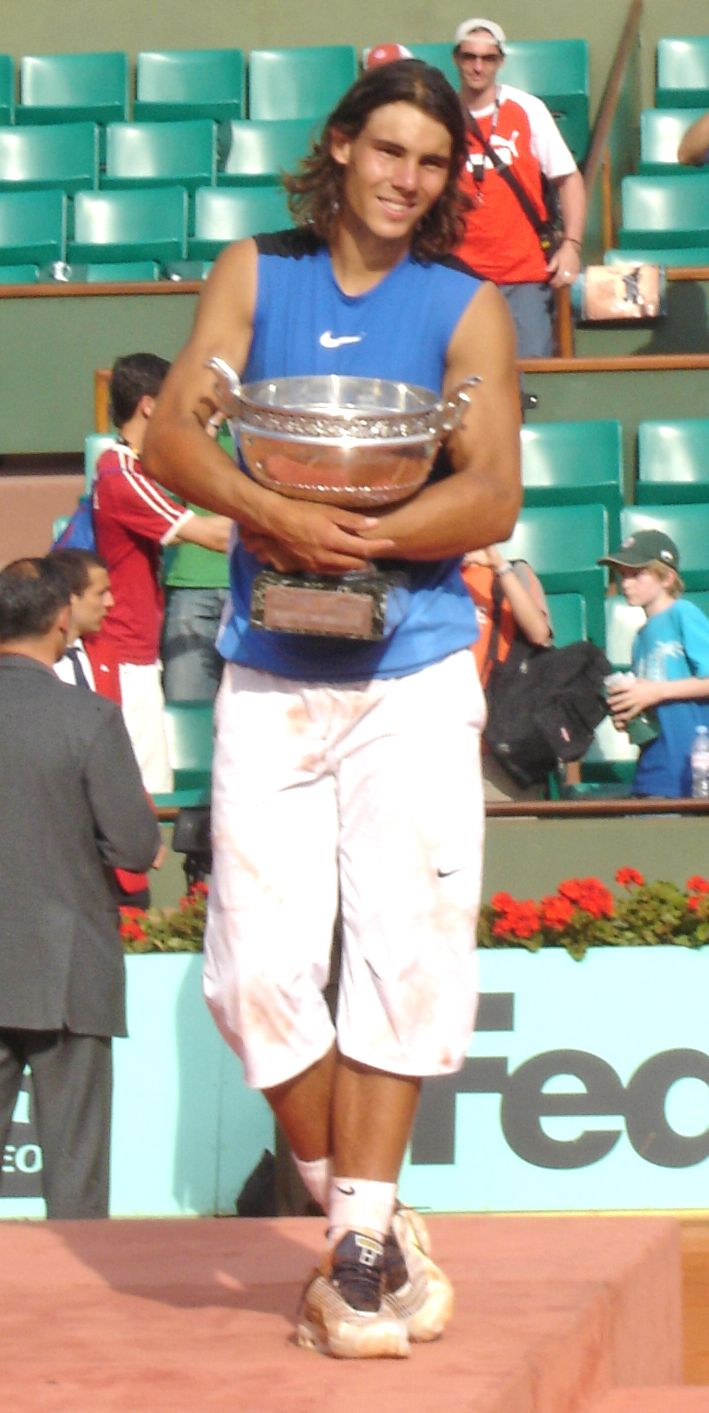
Nadal with the Coupe des Mousquetaires after winning the French Open in 2006.

Nadal beat Federer in the final of the Monte Carlo Masters and Tommy Robredo in the Barcelona final. He won the Italian Open beating Federer in a fifth-set tiebreak in the final, after saving two match points, and equaled Björn Borg's tally of 16 ATP titles won as a teenager. At five hours and five minutes, this was the longest match Federer and Nadal ever contested and it is considered to be where their rivalry began in earnest. The New York Times compared it to the Muhammad Ali–Joe Frazier rivalry in boxing. Nadal then broke Argentinian Guillermo Vilas's 29-year male record of 53 consecutive clay-court match victories by beating Robin Söderling in the first round of the French Open. Nadal beat Novak Djokovic in the quarterfinals, the first-ever meeting of their historic rivalry. He won the final over Federer to become the first player to beat Federer in a major final.

At Wimbledon, Nadal beat No. 20 Andre Agassi in Agassi's last ever match at Wimbledon. Nadal won his next three matches to reach his first Wimbledon final (the first Spanish man since Manuel Santana in 1966 to reach the Wimbledon final). Federer won the final and his fourth consecutive Wimbledon title.

Nadal was upset in the third round of the Rogers Cup in Toronto and in the quarterfinals of Cincinnati by Juan Carlos Ferrero. At the US Open he lost in the quarterfinals to No. 54 Mikhail Youzhny.

Nadal played only three tournaments for the remainder of the year. Joachim Johansson, ranked No. 690, upset Nadal in the second round of the Stockholm Open and he lost to Tomáš Berdych in the quarterfinals of the Madrid Masters. During the round-robin stage of the year-ending Tennis Masters Cup, Nadal lost to James Blake but defeated Nikolay Davydenko and Robredo. Nadal qualified for the semi-finals, where he lost to Federer. This was Nadal's third loss in nine career matches with Federer.

=== 2007: French Open Three-peat ===
At the Australian Open, Nadal lost in the quarterfinals to eventual runner-up Fernando González. After another quarterfinal loss at Dubai, he won Indian Wells after beating Novak Djokovic in the final, before losing to Djokovic in the quarterfinals of Miami.

He won the titles at the Monte Carlo, Barcelona and Rome, before losing to Roger Federer in the final of Hamburg. Going into the Hamburg Masters final, Nadal had a perfect 16–0 record in clay court finals. This defeat ended his 81-match winning streak on clay, which is the male Open Era record for consecutive wins on a single surface. He bounced back quickly in the French Open, not dropping a set en route to the final where he faced Federer once again, this time winning in four sets to join Björn Borg as the only men to win three French Open titles in a row. Between Barcelona and Rome, Nadal beat Federer in the "Battle of Surfaces" exhibition match in Mallorca, with the court being half grass and half clay.

Nadal was upset in the quarterfinals at Queen's. Nadal then won consecutive five-set matches during the third and fourth rounds of Wimbledon before being beaten by Federer in a five-set final. This was Federer's first five-set match at Wimbledon since 2001. In July, Nadal beat Stan Wawrinka in the final of the clay-court Stuttgart Open. Nadal was a semi-finalist in Montreal before losing his first match at the Cincinnati Open. At 2007 US Open, he was defeated in the fourth round by David Ferrer, and spent the tournament dealing with a knee injury.

At Madrid and Paris, David Nalbandian beat Nadal in straight sets in the quarterfinals and final. Nadal won two of his three-round robin matches to advance to the semi-finals of the Tennis Masters Cup in Shanghai, where Federer defeated him in straight sets.

=== 2008: Channel Slam, Olympic singles gold, world No. 1 ===
Nadal reached the semi-finals of the Australian Open for the first time, losing in straight sets to Jo-Wilfried Tsonga. He lost to Nikolay Davydenko in the Miami final.

At Monte Carlo, Nadal beat Federer in the final for the third year in a row to become the first player to win four consecutive titles there since Anthony Wilding in 1914. He also won the doubles event with Tommy Robredo, becoming the first player since Jim Courier in 1991 to win the singles and doubles titles at a Masters Series event. Nadal won his fourth consecutive title at Barcelona. Nadal won his first Masters Hamburg title, defeating Federer, to become the third player to have won all three clay-court Masters Series titles, in Rome, Monte Carlo and Hamburg. He then won the French Open, becoming the fifth man in the Open Era to win a Grand Slam singles title without losing a set. He beat Federer in the final for the third straight year, losing only four games, and gave Federer his first bagel since 1999. This was Nadal's fourth consecutive French title, tying Borg's all-time record. Nadal became the fourth male player during Open Era to win the same Grand Slam singles tournament for four consecutive years.

Nadal faced Federer in the final of Wimbledon for the third consecutive year, in the most anticipated match of their rivalry. Nadal entered the final on a 23-match winning streak, including his first career grass-court title at Queen's. Unlike their previous two Wimbledon finals, Federer was not the prohibitive favorite, and many analysts picked Nadal to win. At 4 hours and 48 minutes, they played the longest final (in terms of time on court, surpassed in 2019) in Wimbledon history, and because of rain delays, Nadal won the fifth set 9–7 in near-darkness. The match was widely lauded as the greatest Wimbledon final ever, with many tennis critics calling it the greatest match in tennis history.

By winning Wimbledon, Nadal became the third man in the Open Era to win both the French Open and Wimbledon in the same year, as well as the second Spaniard to win Wimbledon. He also ended Federer's streak of five consecutive Wimbledon titles and 65 straight wins on grass courts.

Nadal extended his winning streak to a career-best 32 matches by winning his second Canada Masters title in Toronto, and reaching the semi-finals at Cincinnati, where he lost to Djokovic. At the Beijing Olympics, he beat Fernando González in the final to win gold. With the win, Nadal clinched the world No. 1 ranking on 18 August, ending Federer's record four-and-a-half-year reign.

At the US Open, Nadal was the top seed for the first time at a major. He lost in the semi-finals to Andy Murray. Nadal helped Spain defeat the United States in the Davis Cup semi-finals. At the Madrid Masters, Nadal lost in the semi-finals to Gilles Simon. He ended the year-end No. 1, making him the first Spaniard to finish the year No. 1 in the Open Era. At the Paris Masters, Nadal withdrew from his quarterfinal because of a knee injury and ended his season.

=== 2009: Australian Open and Davis Cup titles ===
At the Qatar Open, Nadal lost in the quarterfinals to Gaël Monfils. He won the doubles with Marc López. At the Australian Open, Nadal beat Fernando Verdasco in the semis in the fifth-longest match in Australian Open history (5 hours 14 minutes). Nadal beat Federer in a five-set final (their first meeting in a hard-court major) to win his first hard-court major singles title, and was the first Spaniard to win the Australian Open.

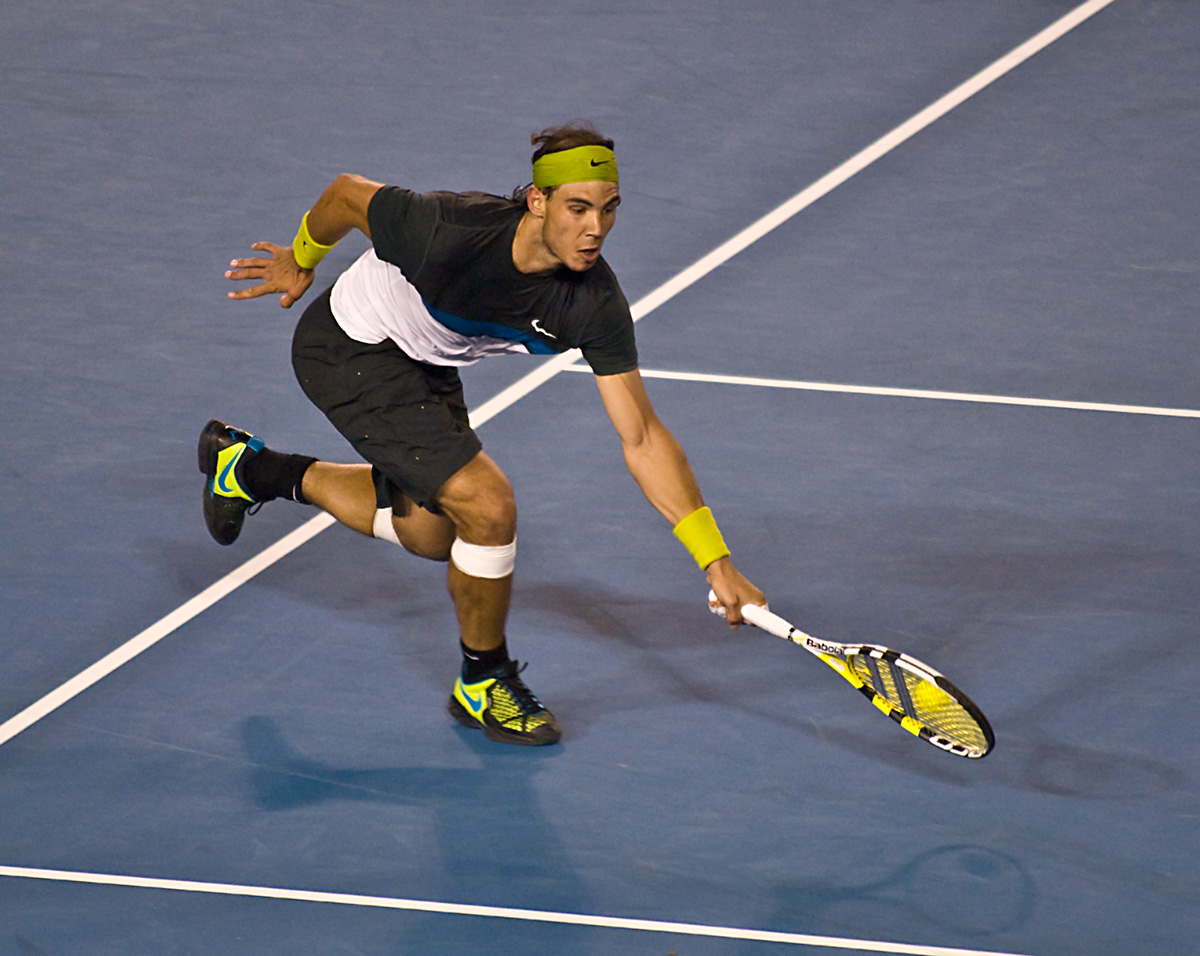
Nadal at the 2009 Australian Open

At Rotterdam, Nadal sustained a knee injury during the final, which he lost to Andy Murray. In March, Nadal beat Janko Tipsarević and Novak Djokovic to help Spain beat Serbia in Davis Cup round one. At Indian Wells, Nadal won his 13th Masters tournament, beating Andy Murray.

At Monte Carlo, Nadal beat Djokovic in the final to win a record fifth consecutive singles title. He won Barcelona and Italian Open, defeating Ferrer and Djokovic respectively. In the semi-finals of the Madrid Open, Nadal saved three match points to defeat Djokovic in a deciding set tiebreaker to take his career record over Djokovic to 14–4. At 4 hours 3 minutes, it was then the longest three-set singles match on the ATP Tour, and voted the best match ever at the Madrid Open in 2022. Exhausted, Nadal lost the final to Federer. This was Nadal's first defeat on clay in 33 matches and his first loss to Federer since the semis of the 2007 Tennis Masters Cup. This was the second time that Federer beat Nadal in this tournament’s final, the previous one was as called the 2007 Hamburg Masters. These would be Nadal’s only 2 losses in his first 33 clay court finals. It would also be the last time Federer would beat Nadal clay, losing the other 14 times.

By beating Marcos Daniel in the first round of the French Open, Nadal broke Björn Borg's 28-year male record of 28 consecutive victories at the French Open, and then broke Chris Evert's record of 29 by beating Teymuraz Gabashvili in round two. This run came to an end on 31 May, when Nadal was upset by eventual runner-up, Robin Söderling in the 4th round. This was Nadal's first loss at the French Open. Former champion Mats Wilander stated after the match that "Everybody's in a state of shock, I would think. At some point, Nadal was going to lose. But nobody expected it to happen today, and maybe not this year." Nadal withdrew from Queen's and Wimbledon due to suffering from tendinitis in both knees. Nadal dropped back to No. 2 behind Federer on 6 July.

At the Montreal, Nadal lost in the quarterfinals to del Potro, meaning he dropped outside the top two for the first time since 2005. He lost in the semi-finals of Cincinnati to Djokovic in straight sets. At the US Open Nadal lost in the semi-finals to eventual champion del Potro. At the ATP Finals, Nadal lost all three matches to Robin Söderling, Nikolay Davydenko, and Djokovic without winning a set. In December, Nadal beat Tomáš Berdych in the Davis Cup final. Spain secured its fourth Davis Cup victory. Nadal finished the year as No. 2.

=== 2010: Majors on all three surfaces, Career Golden Slam, year-end No. 1 ===
In his first ATP tournament of the year, Nadal reached the final of the Qatar Open, losing to Nikolay Davydenko. At the Australian Open, Nadal reached the quarterfinals, where he retired in the third set against Andy Murray.

Nadal reached the semi-finals of the Indian Wells Open and Miami Masters, losing to the eventual champions. Nadal won Monte Carlo. It was his first title in 11 months, having lost only 14 games en route to become the first player in the Open Era to win the same tournament for six straight years. At Italian Open, he defeated David Ferrer in the final for his fifth title. At Madrid, Nadal beat Federer to become the first man to complete a clean sweep of the three clay-court Masters 1000 titles and it was his 18th Masters title, breaking Andre Agassi's record. He moved back to No. 2 in the rankings.

At the French Open, Nadal beat Söderling in the final to win his fifth French Open. This marked the second time Nadal won the title without dropping a set. Nadal regained the No. 1 ranking from Federer.

At Queen's, his 24-match winning streak was snapped by Feliciano López in the quarterfinals. At Wimbledon, Nadal needed five sets to defeat Philipp Petzschner in the third round, receiving a $2,000 fine for coaching during the match. He beat Tomáš Berdych in the final to win his second Wimbledon title and eighth major title.

In Canada, Nadal lost in the semi-finals to Murray. He played doubles with Djokovic in a one-time partnership, losing in the first round. At Cincinnati, he lost in the quarterfinals to Marcos Baghdatis. At the US Open, Nadal reached his first final without dropping a set and then beat Novak Djokovic to complete his first Career Grand Slam while becoming the second male after Andre Agassi to complete a Career Golden Slam. He became the first man to win majors on clay, grass, and hard courts in the same year, and the first to win the French Open, Wimbledon, and the US Open in the same year since Rod Laver in 1969. Nadal's victory clinched him the year-end No. 1 ranking.

In Bangkok he was upset by Guillermo García-López in the semi-finals despite creating 26 break points. Nadal won the Japan Open after beating Gaël Monfils in the final for his seventh title of the season. At Shanghai, he lost to Jürgen Melzer in the third round. Nadal won the Stefan Edberg Sportsmanship Award. At the ATP Finals in London, Nadal won all his round-robin matches for the first time in his career. He lost to Federer in the final.

Nadal called 2010 his best year. Djokovic said that Nadal had "the capabilities already to become the best player ever", and that "he has the game now for each surface, and he has won each major. He has proven to the world that he is the best in this moment".

=== 2011: Sixth French Open title, Davis Cup champion ===
At Mubadala World Tennis Championship exhibition event in Abu Dhabi, Nafal beat Roger Federer in the final. At the Qatar Open, Nadal lost in straight sets to Nikolay Davydenko in the semi-finals but went on to win the doubles title alongside Marc López. At the Australian Open, Nadal suffered a hamstring injury against David Ferrer early in his quarterfinal match and lost in straight sets, thus ending his attempt to win four major tournaments in a row.

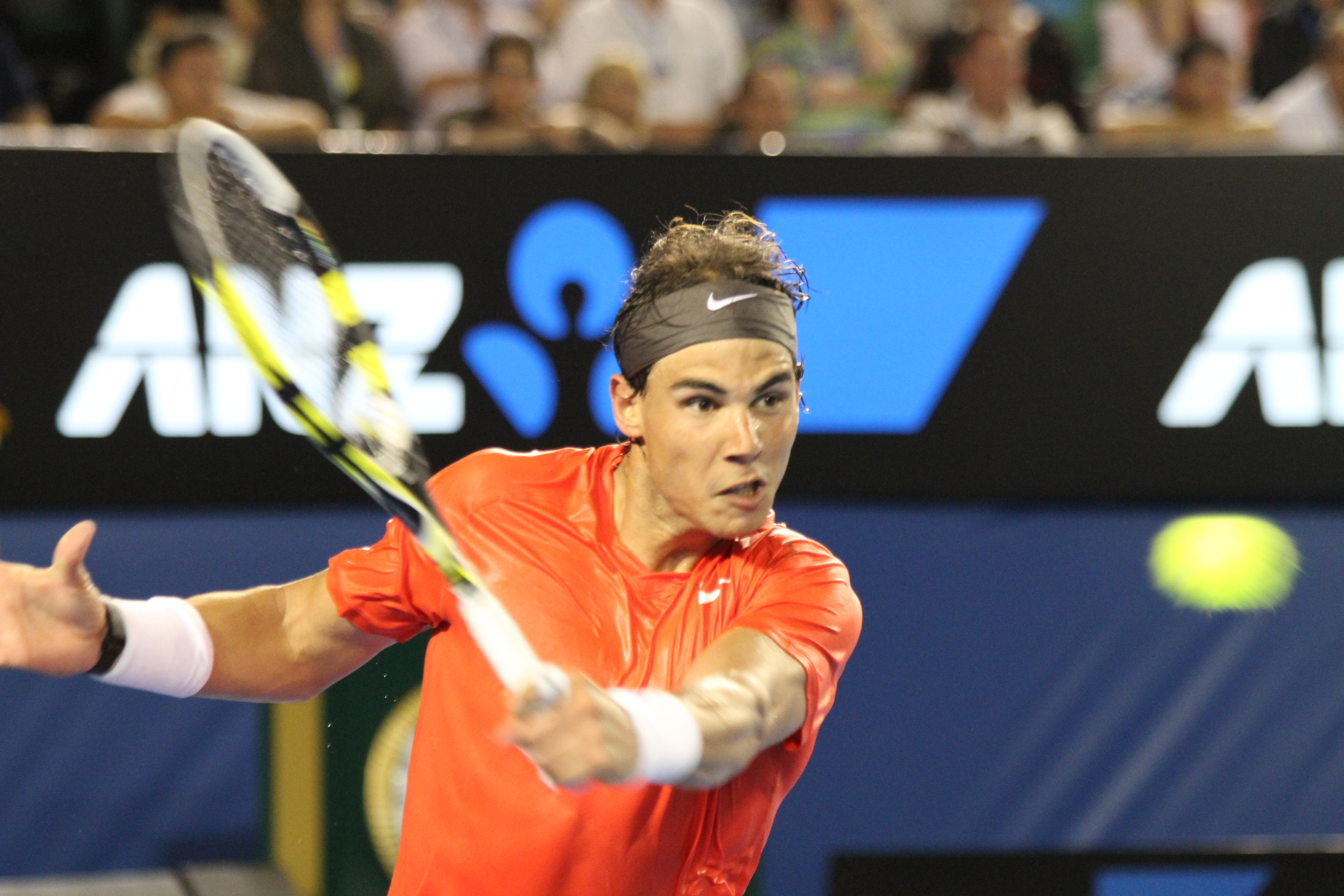
Nadal at the 2011 Australian Open.

In March, Nadal helped Spain defeat Belgium in a 2011 Davis Cup World Group first-round tie in the Spiroudome in Charleroi, Belgium. He beat Ruben Bemelmans and Olivier Rochus. Nadal reached the finals at Indian Wells and Miami, losing to Novak Djokovic in three sets.

Nadal won Monte Carlo with the loss of one set. In the final he beat Ferrer. Nadal won his sixth Barcelona crown, again defeating Ferrer in straight sets. This was the 31st clay court title of his career, thus breaking a tie that he jointly held with Björn Borg and Manuel Orantes for the third most clay titles in the Open Era. He then lost to Novak Djokovic in the finals of the Italian Open and Madrid Open, which ended his 37-match winning streak on clay. However, Nadal retained his No. 1 ranking during the clay-court season and won his sixth French Open title by defeating Roger Federer.

At Wimbledon, Nadal faced Novak Djokovic in the final. Djokovic's victory in the semi-finals meant that he was going to replace Nadal as the world No. 1 at the end of the tournament, regardless of the result at the final, which Nadal lost in four sets. This was Nadal's first defeat at Wimbledon since the 2007 final and ended his 20-match winning streak there. After resting for a month from a foot injury sustained during Wimbledon, he entered the Canadian Open and lost a deciding set tiebreaker to No. 41 Ivan Dodig in the quarterfinals. At Cincinnati, he defeated Fernando Verdasco in a third round clash that lasted three hours and 38 minutes with three tiebreaks. This was the fifth time that Nadal played in a three tiebreak match, winning all five. In the quarterfinals, Nadal was hampered by burns to his right hand after an accident at a Japanese restaurant and lost to Mardy Fish in straight sets.

After defeating David Nalbandian in the third round of the US Open, Nadal collapsed in his post-match press conference due to severe cramps. Nadal then played Djokovic in their second successive major final, losing the match in four sets. Nadal reached the final of the Japan Open, where he was defeated by Andy Murray. At Shanghai, he was upset in the third round by No. 23 ranked Florian Mayer. At the ATP Finals, Nadal was defeated by Roger Federer and Jo-Wilfried Tsonga in the round-robin stage, and was eliminated from the tournament. In the Davis Cup final in December, he helped Spain win the title with victories over Juan Mónaco and Juan Martín del Potro.

=== 2012: Seventh French Open title ===
At Qatar Open, Nadal lost to Gaël Monfils in the semi-finals. At the Australian Open, Nadal won his semi-final match against Roger Federer to set up a third successive major final against Novak Djokovic, which he lost in a five-set epic that lasted 5 hours and 53 minutes, the longest Grand Slam final match (by duration) in history. It is considered to be one of the greatest tennis matches of all time. It was the longest match of both Nadal and Djokovic's careers, and was the only time that Nadal lost a major final after winning the first set. Nadal called it "one of the toughest moments in my career".

Nadal then reached the semi-finals of both the Indian Wells, where he was beaten by Federer, and Miami, where he withdrew because of knee problems. At Monte Carlo, Nadal did not lose a set en route to the title to become the first man in the Open Era to win the same tournament eight consecutive times. In the final, he defeated No. 1 Novak Djokovic to end a streak of seven straight final losses to him. This was the most lopsided of all their matches, as Nadal only lost four games. Nadal then beat David Ferrer in a three-set final to clinch his seventh title in eight years at Barcelona. At Madrid, Nadal lost to Fernando Verdasco, whom he held a 13–0 record against. He criticized the new blue clay and threatened to skip future events if the surface wasn't changed back to red clay, a sentiment echoed by several players, including Novak Djokovic. He beat Djokovic in a tight straight-set final at the Italian Open.

At the French Open, Nadal won his semi-final match against Ferrer to set up another final against Novak Djokovic. This marked only the second time in tennis history (after Serena and Venus Williams between the 2002 French Open and the 2003 Australian Open), two players played four consecutive major singles finals against each other. After rain delays pushed the conclusion of the final into a second day, Nadal emerged victorious in four sets. Nadal became the most successful male player at the French Open (overtaking Borg) with seven titles. Nadal lost a total of only three sets in the 2012 clay court season.

As a warm-up ahead of Wimbledon, Nadal played in Halle, losing to Philipp Kohlschreiber in the quarterfinals. At Wimbledon, Nadal was upset in the second round by Lukáš Rosol in five sets. This was the first time since the 2005 Wimbledon championships that Nadal failed to pass the second round of a Grand Slam.

Nadal then ended his season early due to tendinitis in his knee.

=== 2013: Two majors, five Masters, return to No. 1 ===
Nadal withdrew from Australian Open with a stomach virus and dropped out of the ATP Top 4 for the first time since 2005. He returned at the VTR Open in Chile, where he was upset by Argentine No. 73 Horacio Zeballos in the final. At the Brasil Open, Nadal beat David Nalbandian in the final. In the Mexican Open, Nadal defeated David Ferrer, losing just two games.

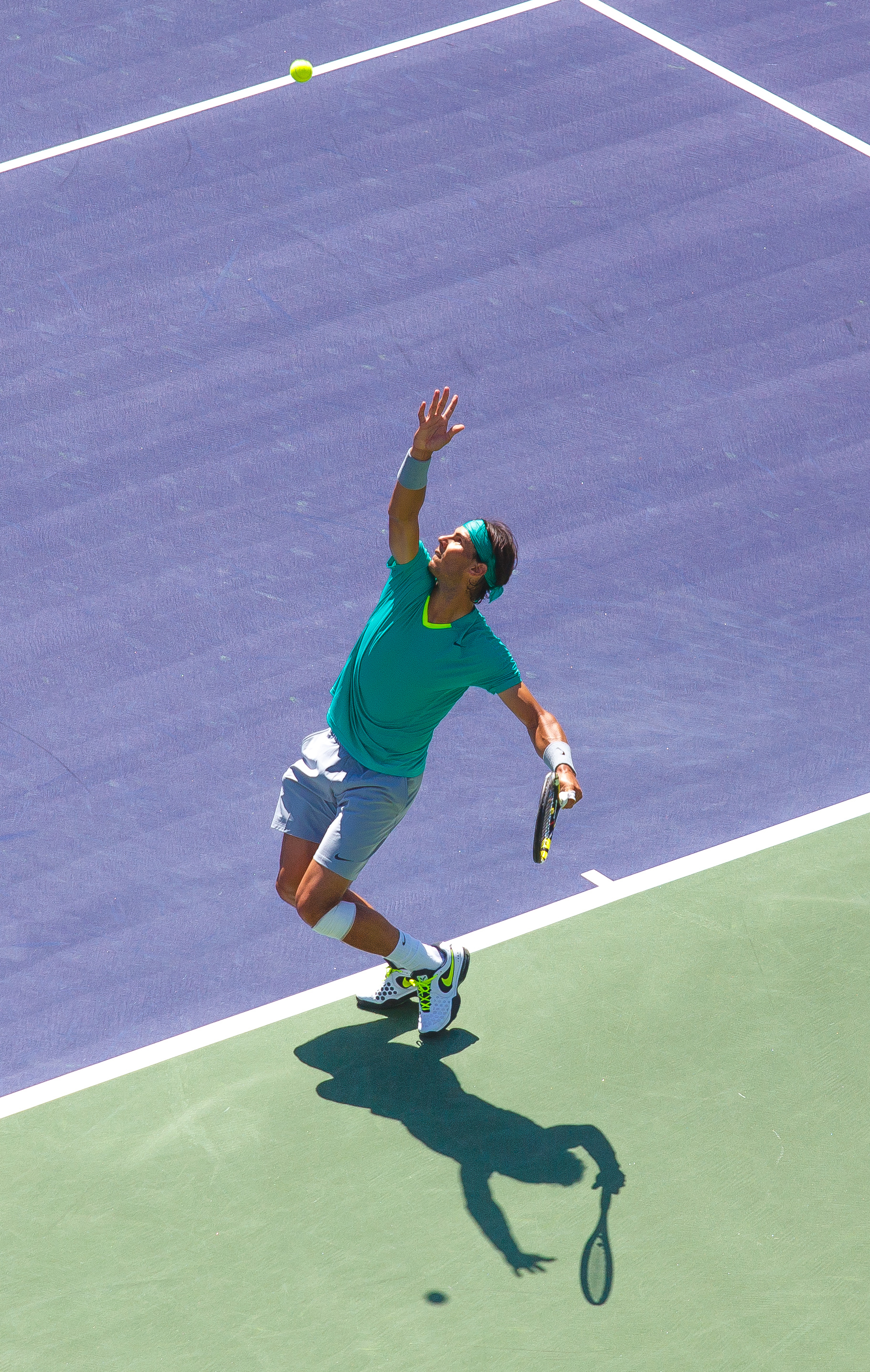
Nadal serving at the Indian Wells Open in 2013.

At Indian Wells, he lost only one set en route to the title, defeating Roger Federer, Tomáš Berdych and Juan Martín del Potro in the final. Nadal was beaten by Djokovic in straight sets in Monte Carlo to end his eight-year reign at the tournament. He then won his eighth title at Barcelona. Nadal went on to win Madrid. This was the 40th clay court title of his career, equal second with Thomas Muster. Nadal then overtook him when he beat Federer for his 7th title at the Italian Open. These victories raised his ranking to No. 4.

Nadal won the French Open beating David Ferrer in the final, breaking the record for the most match wins in the tournament with his 59th victory. Nadal became the first man to win any major eight times. His semi-final against Djokovic has been called one of the greatest clay court matches ever, with Nadal rallying from a break down in the fifth set to win after 4 hours and 37 minutes. This was only the second time Nadal had been pushed to five sets at the French Open (the first was against John Isner in 2011). This victory meant that since returning from injury, Nadal had reached eight consecutive finals, won 7 titles, and compiled a 43–2 record in 2013. However, Nadal then lost his first-round match at Wimbledon to Steve Darcis, his first loss in the first round of a major. At the time, he was the lowest-ranked player ever to beat Nadal in a Grand Slam.

In August, Nadal won the Canadian Open. He won his 26th Masters title in Cincinnati beating John Isner in the final. He won his 4th hard court title of the year, defeating Djokovic in the US Open final to achieve the Summer Slam and clinch the US Open Series. This granted him $3.6 million in prize money, the most money earned by a man at a single tournament.

Nadal helped Spain secure a Davis Cup World Group place for 2014, beating Sergiy Stakhovsky and winning a doubles with Marc Lopez. In October, he reached the final of the China Open and regained the No. 1 ranking. In the final, he was beaten by Djokovic. He lost in the Shanghai semis to Del Potro. In November, at the ATP Finals in London, he secured the year-end No. 1. He beat Federer in the semis before losing in straight sets to Djokovic in the final.

=== 2014: Ninth French Open title and sustained injuries ===
At the Qatar Open, Nadal won the title beating Gaël Monfils in the final. At the Australian Open, he defeated Roger Federer to reach his third Australian Open final. In the final, he faced Stanislas Wawrinka, against whom he entered the match with a 12–0 record. However, Nadal suffered a back injury during the warm-up, which progressively worsened as the match wore on. Nadal lost the first two sets, and although he won the third set, he lost the match in four sets. At the inaugural Rio Open he beat Alexandr Dolgopolov in the final. However, at the Indian Wells Open, Dolgopolov would avenge his loss, defeating Nadal in three sets in the third round. He reached the final of the Miami Masters, losing to Novak Djokovic in straight sets.

Nadal began his clay court season with a quarterfinal loss to David Ferrer at Monte Carlo. He was stunned by Nicolas Almagro in the quarterfinals of the Barcelona Open. Nadal then won his 27th masters title at Madrid after Kei Nishikori retired in the third set of the final. Nadal defeated Novak Djokovic in the Men's Singles French Open final to win his 9th French Open title and a 5th straight win. Nadal equaled Pete Sampras' total of 14 Grand Slam wins. Nadal then lost in the second round of Halle to Dustin Brown.

At the Wimbledon Championships he was upset by Australian teenager Nick Kyrgios in four sets in the fourth round. Nadal withdrew from the American swing owing to a wrist injury. He made his return at the 2014 China Open but was defeated in the quarterfinals by Martin Klizan in three sets. At Shanghai, he was suffering from appendicitis and lost his first match to Feliciano Lopez in straight sets. He was upset by Borna Ćorić at the quarterfinals of the 2014 Swiss Indoors. He skipped the rest of the season to undergo surgery for his appendix.

=== 2015: Continued struggles ===
At Qatar Open, Nadal lost in three set to Michael Berrer in round one. He won the doubles title with Juan Mónaco. At the Australian Open, Nadal lost in straight sets to Tomáš Berdych in the quarterfinal, ending a 17-match winning streak against the seventh-seeded Czech.

In February, Nadal lost in the semi-finals to Fabio Fognini at the Rio Open, before winning his 46th career clay-court title against Juan Mónaco at the Argentina Open. At Indian Wells and Miami he suffered early defeats to Milos Raonic and Fernando Verdasco, in the quarterfinals and third round respectively. At Monte Carlo he lost to Novak Djokovic in straight sets in the semi finals, at Barcelona he lost to Fognini in the quarterfinals and at Madrid he lost the final to Andy Murray in straight sets, resulting in his dropping out of the top five for the first time since 2005. He lost in the quarterfinals of Rome to Stan Wawrinka in straight sets.

Nadal lost to Djokovic in the quarterfinals of the French Open, ending his winning streak of 39 consecutive victories in Paris since his 2009 defeat by Robin Söderling. Nadal went on to win the 2015 Mercedes Cup against Serbian Viktor Troicki, his first grass court title since he won at Wimbledon in 2010. He lost in the first round of the Aegon Championships to Alexandr Dolgopolov in three sets. He lost in the second round of Wimbledon to Dustin Brown.

In the third round of the 2015 US Open, Nadal again lost to Fognini, despite an early two set lead. This loss ended Nadal's record 10 consecutive years of winning at least one Grand Slam title per year.

=== 2016: Olympic doubles gold ===
Nadal lost to Djokovic in straight sets in the final in Doha. This was their 47th match, after which Djokovic led their head-to-head with 24 matches won. At the Australian Open, Nadal lost in five sets to Fernando Verdasco in round one (his first opening round exit at the Australian Open).

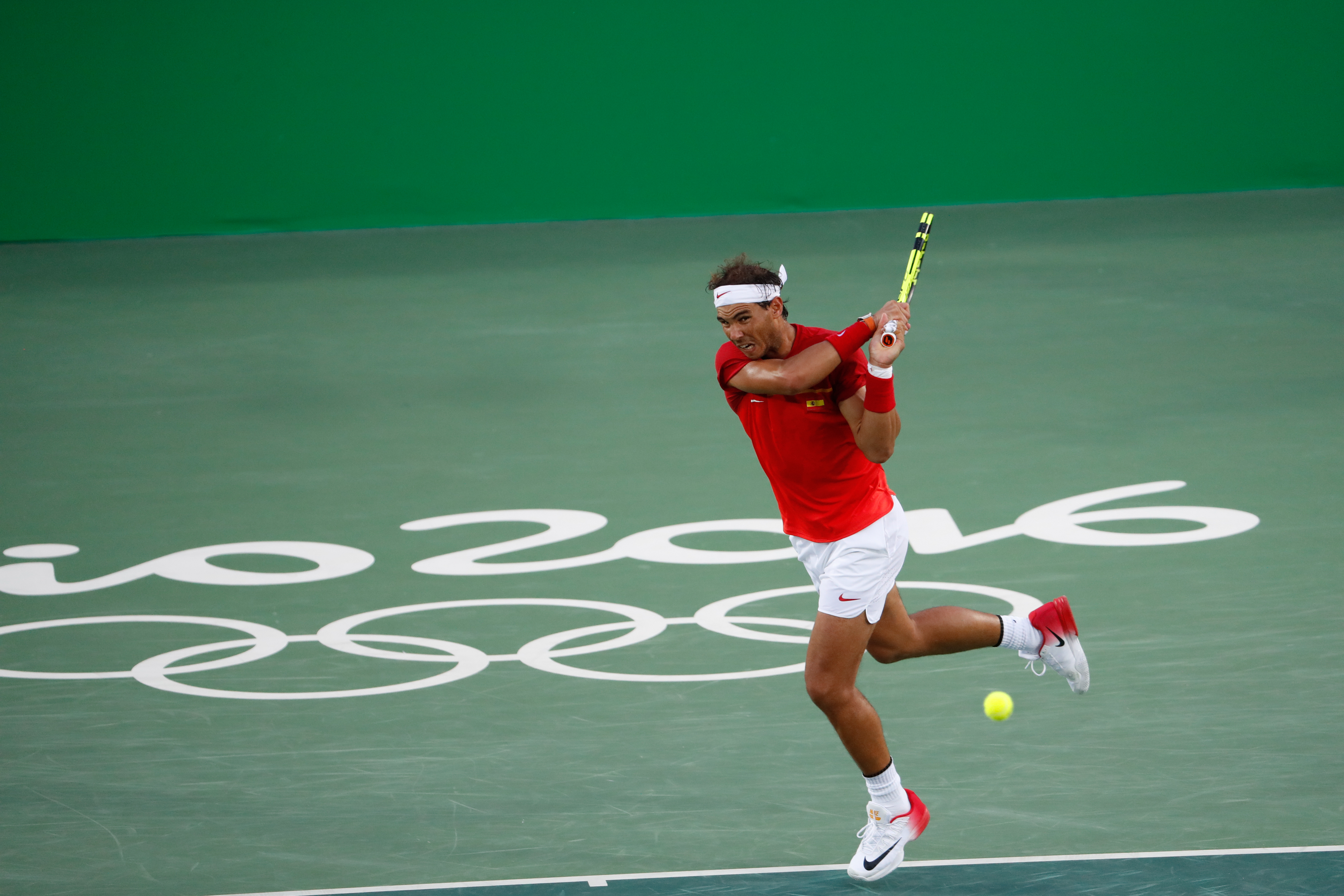
Nadal at the 2016 Rio Olympics.

In April he won his 28th Masters title in Monte Carlo. He won his 17th ATP 500 in Barcelona, winning the trophy for the ninth time in his career. At Madrid, he lost to Murray in the semi-final. At Italian Open he lost in the quarterfinals to Djokovic in straight sets.

At the French Open, he became the eighth male player in tennis history to record 200 Grand Slam match wins when he won his second round match. Following the victory, Nadal had to withdraw from competition owing to a left wrist injury initially suffered during the Madrid Open, handing Marcel Granollers a walkover into the fourth round. The same wrist injury forced him to withdraw from the 2016 Wimbledon Championships. At the Rio 2016 Olympics, Nadal achieved 800 career wins with his quarterfinal victory over the Brazilian Thomaz Bellucci. Partnering Marc López, he won the gold medal in men's doubles event for Spain by defeating Romania's Florin Mergea and Horia Tecau in the final. This made Nadal the second man in the Open Era to have won gold medals in both singles and doubles. Nadal lost the bronze medal match in men's singles to Kei Nishikori.

At the US Open Nadal advanced to the fourth round but was defeated by 24th seed Lucas Pouille in 5 sets. The defeat meant that 2016 was the first year since 2004 in which Nadal had failed to reach a Grand Slam quarter-final. After losing in the second round of the Shanghai Masters, he ended his 2016 season.

=== 2017: La Décima, third US Open title, year-end No. 1 ===
At the Brisbane International Nadal lost to Milos Raonic in the quarterfinals. Nadal began the Australian Open with straight-set wins over Florian Mayer and Marcos Baghdatis, before wins over Alexander Zverev and Gaël Monfils, to reach his first Grand Slam quarterfinal since the 2015 French Open. Nadal beat Raonic and Grigor Dimitrov, to set up a final against Federer, his first Grand Slam final since he won the 2014 French Open. Nadal lost to Federer in five sets; the first time that Nadal had lost to Federer in a Grand Slam since the 2007 Wimbledon Championships.

At Acapulco lost to Sam Querrey in the final. Nadal lost to Federer in the fourth round at Indian Wells and the Miami final. Nadal then won his 29th Masters title in Monte Carlo; his tenth title, the most wins by any player at a single tournament in the Open Era. Nadal won Barcelona without dropping a set (his 10th title). At Madrid, he beat Dominic Thiem to tie Djokovic's all-time Masters record of 30 titles.

Nadal beat Stan Wawrinka to win a record tenth French Open title. Nadal won every set, dropping only 35 games in seven matches, which is the second-fewest by any male player en route to a major title in the Open Era. The title "La Décima" ("the tenth" in Spanish) was used to proclaim Nadal's achievement in becoming the first player to win 10 titles at a single major in the Open Era. Nadal climbed to second on the all-time major singles titles list, with 15, placing him one ahead of Pete Sampras.

Nadal lost in the round of 16 at Wimbledon, 13–15 in the fifth set, to Gilles Müller. In August he retook the ATP No. 1 ranking from Andy Murray. Nadal earned his third US Open title against Kevin Anderson. This was the first time he had captured two Grand Slams in a year since 2013. Nadal extended his streak by winning the China Open, beating Nick Kyrgios. On 11 September 2017, Nadal and Garbiñe Muguruza made Spain the first country since the US 14 years earlier to simultaneously top the ATP and the WTA rankings.

After defeating Hyeon Chung in the second round of the Paris Masters Nadal secured the year-end No. 1, for the fourth time in his career. This tied him Djokovic, Ivan Lendl and John McEnroe, behind Pete Sampras (6), and Federer and Jimmy Connors (5). He became the first player aged over 30 to finish as year-end No. 1 and the first to finish in the top spot four years since he last achieved the feat.

=== 2018: 11th French Open and Monte Carlo titles ===
At the Australian Open, Nadal retired in the fifth set of his quarterfinal against Marin Čilić due to a hip injury.

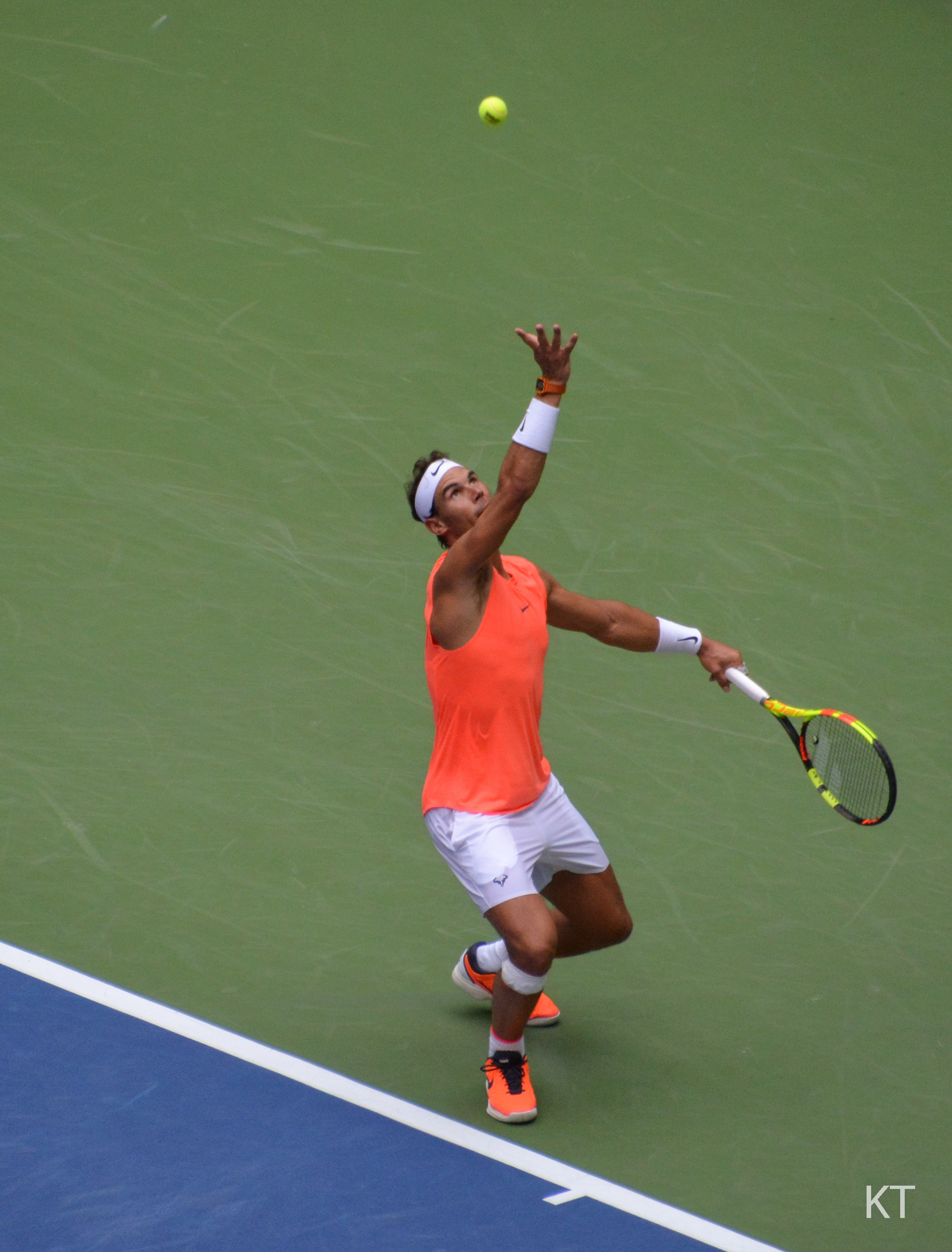
Nadal serving at the 2018 US Open.

On 16 February, Nadal dropped to the No. 2 ranking after 26 weeks at the top when Roger Federer overtook him. Nadal was then sidelined with an injury. He regained the No. 1 ranking on 2 April due to Federer's second-round Miami loss. After recovering from injury, Nadal helped secure the Spain Davis Cup team a victory over Germany in the quarterfinal. He beat Philipp Kohlschreiber and Alexander Zverev.

Nadal won his 11th Monte Carlo title without losing a set (beating Kei Nishikori in the final, a then-record-breaking 31st Masters title). He won his 11th title in Barcelona, beating Stefanos Tsitsipas in straight sets, becoming the first player in the Open Era to win 400 matches on clay and hard. It was his 20th ATP 500 series title (tied at the top with Federer).

At Madrid, he beat Diego Schwartzman in straight sets, to extend his record to 50 consecutive sets won on clay and broke John McEnroe's record of 49 straight sets won on a single surface. Nadal lost in straight sets to Dominic Thiem in the quarters, ending his 21-match and record 50-set winning streaks on clay. Federer overtook him as world No. 1.

At Rome, Nadal won his 8th title beating Alexander Zverev in three sets, ending Zverev's 13-match winning streak dating to the 2018 BMW Open, to reach fourth place (overtaking McEnroe) on the men's singles titles in the Open Era leaderboard with 78. It was Nadal's record 32nd Masters title and he also regained the No. 1 spot from Federer.

At the French Open, Nadal won his 17th Grand Slam title. This tied Margaret Court's record for singles titles at a Grand Slam event (Court won 11 Australian Opens). Nadal dropped only one set at the event, beating Dominic Thiem in the final in three sets. Nadal became the fourth man in the Open Era to win three or more major titles after turning 30.

At Wimbledon, Nadal beat Juan Martín del Potro in five sets in the quarters. In the semi-finals he faced rival Novak Djokovic. The match lasted 5 hours 15 minutes, spread over two days, the second-longest Wimbledon semi-final ever. Djokovic won in the fifth set 10–8. It was Nadal's first loss in the semis of a major since US Open 2009 and his first Wimbledon semi final since 2011, ensuring Nadal retained his No. 1 ranking. It is considered one of the greatest matches in Wimbledon history and of all time.

He won the Rogers Cup, a record-extending 33rd Masters title and his first Masters title on hard court since 2013. At US Open he first beat David Ferrer in Ferrer's last Grand Slam match, who retired due to injury. In his semi-final against Juan Martin del Potro, Nadal retired after losing the second set 6–2 due to knee pain. He withdrew from the Paris Masters due to an abdominal injury. As a result, Novak Djokovic replaced him as world No. 1.

=== 2019: Two majors, Davis Cup champion, year-end No. 1 ===
At Australian Open, Nadal progressed to his fifth Australian Open final without losing a set, then won only eight games against Novak Djokovic, which was Nadal's first straight-sets defeat in a major final. After losing in the second round of the Mexico Open to Nick Kyrgios, he was sidelined with a right hip injury.

At Monte Carlo, he lost in the semi-finals to Fabio Fognini in straight sets. At Barcelona, he lost to Dominic Thiem in straight sets in the semis. At Madrid, he lost to Stefanos Tsitsipas in three sets in the semi-finals. He won his first tournament of the year in Rome, with a three-set win over Djokovic in the final.

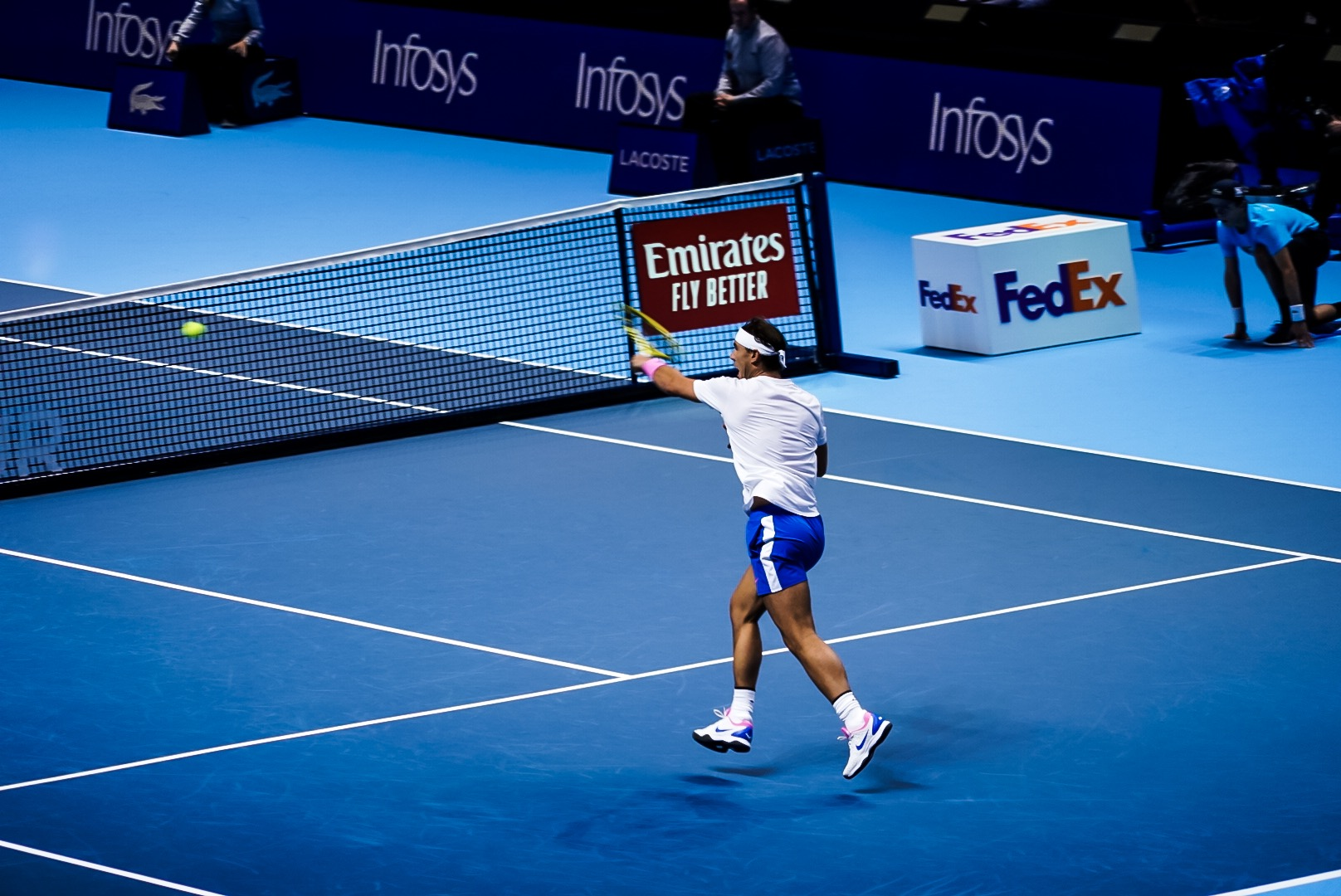
Nadal at the 2019 ATP Finals in London.

At the French Open, Nadal beat Kei Nishikori and Roger Federer (their first meeting at the tournament since 2011) en route to the final, dropping only one set en route. Nadal won in four sets against Thiem to claim his record-extending twelfth French Open title. He broke Margaret Court's all-time record of singles titles won at the same major.

At Wimbledon he reached the semi-finals, where he faced Federer for the first time at Wimbledon since the 2008 final and lost in four sets. At the Rogers Cup, by defeating Fabio Fognini in the quarterfinals, he surpassed Roger Federer's record of 378 victories at Masters tournaments. In the final, Nadal lost three games to Daniil Medvedev. This victory marked the first time he defended a title on a surface other than clay. At the US Open, Nadal lost one set (against Marin Čilić) en route to the final, where he beat Medvedev in five sets to win his fourth US Open title and 19th major title overall, and completed his second-best Grand Slam year. At the Paris Masters, Nadal reached the semi-finals, but withdrew due to an abdominal injury.

At the ATP Finals, Nadal beat Tsitsipas and Medvedev in the round-robin stage, but failed to progress to the semi-finals. Nadal secured the year-end No. 1 ranking when Djokovic was also eliminated in the round-robin stage. This was Nadal's fifth time as the year-end No. 1 player, drawing level with Jimmy Connors, Federer and Djokovic behind Pete Sampras (six). He became (at the time) the oldest person to finish as the year-end No. 1 player, and created a record eleven-year gap between his first and last year-end No. 1 seasons (2008 and 2019, respectively).

At the 2019 Davis Cup Finals, Nadal helped Spain win its sixth Davis Cup title, beating Canada. Nadal extended his winning streak in Davis Cup singles matches to 29 (29–1 record overall), without dropping a set or having his serve broken; he also won the tournament's Most Valuable Player award.

=== 2020: 13th French Open title ===
At the inaugural ATP Cup Nadal helped Spain reach the final where they lost to Serbia, with Nadal losing to Djokovic in straight sets. At the Australian Open Nadal won his first three matches in straight sets against Hugo Dellien, Federico Delbonis and Pablo Carreño Busta. In the fourth round, he defeated Nick Kyrgios in four sets and lost in the quarterfinals to eventual runner-up Dominic Thiem in four sets. Nadal won his third Mexican Open title, defeating Taylor Fritz in straights sets in the final.

Nadal won his 13th French Open, beating Novak Djokovic in straight sets in the final, only losing seven games. In doing so, he won his 20th Grand Slam title, equalling Roger Federer's men's singles record. It also marked his 100th win at the tournament, losing only twice in 16 years, and was the 4th time that he won a Grand Slam without losing a set, doing it also at the French Open in 2008, 2010 and 2017.

At the Paris Masters, Nadal defeated Feliciano López in the second round to get his 1,000 victory on the ATP Tour, becoming the fourth man in the Open Era to achieve that milestone. He lost in the semi-finals to Alexander Zverev in straight sets.

On 9 November 2020, Nadal reached his 790th back to back week as one of the ten highest placed players on the ATP rankings and surpassed the record held by Jimmy Connors.

At the ATP Finals, Nadal defeated Rublev and defending champion Tsitsipas progressing to the semi-finals and securing ending the year as No. 2. Nadal lost his semi-final to eventual champion Daniil Medvedev in three sets. This was the seventh time that Nadal had finished Year-end No. 2 and now led the "Big Three" with 12 Top 2 finishes.

=== 2021: 10th Italian Open title and injury-shortened season ===
At the Australian Open, Nadal lost in the quarterfinals to world No. 5 Stefanos Tsitsipas, despite being two sets to love up. Nadal next played at Monte Carlo and reached the quarterfinals, where he lost to Andrey Rublev in three sets. On 25 April, Nadal won a record-extending twelfth Barcelona Open trophy with a three-set victory over Stefanos Tsitsipas in the final, saving a championship point in the third set. At 3 hours and 38 minutes, this was the longest best-of-three-set ATP Tour final since ATP began publishing statistics in 1991. In May he reached the quarterfinals at the Madrid Open. He won a record-extending tenth Italian Open title, saving two match points against Denis Shapovalov before beating Novak Djokovic in the final.

At the French Open, he beat Jannik Sinner and Diego Schwartzman before losing in the semis to eventual champion Djokovic in four sets, in only his third-ever loss at the French Open and his first loss in the semi-finals. After several weeks out with a left foot injury that had flared up at the French Open, Nadal returned to action at the 2021 Citi Open. He beat Jack Sock in a tight three-set match before being upset by 50th ranked Lloyd Harris in the 3rd round. On 20 August 2021, Nadal announced that would be ending his 2021 season due to the left foot issue that had been troubling him for most of the year. His ranking fell to No.6 due to his injury.

=== 2022: 21st and 22nd majors, double Career Grand Slam ===
In January, Nadal won Melbourne Summer Set 1, beating Maxime Cressy in the final. He won his second Australian Open title, 21st major title and 90th ATP title beating Daniil Medvedev in a five-set final, coming back from two sets down. With the win, Nadal surpassed a tie with Novak Djokovic and Roger Federer for the most men's singles major titles of all time and became the second man in the Open Era, after Djokovic, to complete the double Career Grand Slam.

At the Mexican Open, Nadal won the title without dropping a set, including a win over new world No. 1 Medvedev. He extended his winning streak to 15 matches, his best ever start to a season. At Indian Wells he beat Nick Kyrgios and Carlos Alcaraz to reach his fourth final of the year and extend his winning streak to 20 matches. Nadal had a rib injury and lost to Taylor Fritz in straight sets in the final.

Nadal returned at the Madrid Open, where he beat Miomir Kecmanović and David Goffin and lost to Carlos Alcaraz. At Rome, he beat John Isner in straight sets, but lost to Denis Shapovalov in three sets.

At the French Open, Nadal recorded his 106th win defeating Jordan Thompson in the first round, becoming the player with most wins at a single major. He beat Corentin Moutet in round two (his 300th win in majors). He beat Felix Auger Aliassime in the fourth round (his third five setter ever at the French Open). Nadal met Djokovic for the 59th time in the quarterfinals and won in four sets to advance to his 15th French Open semi-final. He faced Alexander Zverev and after more than three hours with two sets played, Zverev retired due to an ankle injury. In the final, he defeated Casper Ruud in three sets to win his 14th French Open title and 22nd major title overall and reached world No. 4. He became the then-oldest French Open champion ever, and the third man to earn four Top-10 wins en route to a major title since the ATP rankings started in 1973, after Mats Wilander (1982 French Open) and Federer (2017 Australian Open).

After treating his foot injury, Nadal returned to Wimbledon for the first time in three years. He beat Taylor Fritz in the quarterfinal, but aggravated an abdominal injury, and had to withdraw from the tournament.

Nadal lost in round one at Cincinnati to eventual champion Borna Ćorić. Nadal returned to the US Open for the first time since 2019. He lost in round four to Frances Tiafoe, his only loss at a major in 2022, and his earliest major defeat since the 2017 Wimbledon Championships.

At the Laver Cup, Nadal competed for Team Europe alongside Roger Federer, Novak Djokovic, and Andy Murray. He played doubles with rival Federer (Roger's final professional match), losing to Jack Sock and Frances Tiafoe. At the ATP Finals, Nadal won his last match of the year against Casper Ruud after losing his first two matches. Nadal finished the year ranked No. 2, becoming the oldest year-end top-2 player in the history of the ATP rankings.

=== 2023: Injury struggles and exit from top 10 after 18 consecutive years ===
Nadal was the defending champion at the 2023 Australian Open, but lost in straight sets to Mackenzie McDonald in the second round. During the match, Nadal was severely hampered by a hip injury. Nadal withdrew from Indian Wells and Miami to recover from his Australian Open injury and didn't play on tour again in 2023. As a result, he exited the Top 10 for the first time since 25 April 2005 on 20 March 2023, ending the longest Top-10 streak in ATP rankings history.

=== 2024: Return to the tour and retirement ===
Nadal began his season at the 2024 Brisbane International, defeating Dominic Thiem and Jason Kubler before losing to Jordan Thompson. During the match, he sustained a muscle injury that forced him to miss the Australian Open.

Following a second-round loss to Alex de Minaur at the Barcelona Open, Nadal reached the fourth round at the Madrid Open, defeating de Minaur en route. He lost in round two at the Italian Open. In May, Nadal lost in the first round of the French Open to world No. 4 and eventual runner-up Alexander Zverev. This brought his final Roland-Garros record to 112–4.

At the Swedish Open in July, he reached his last career ATP Tour final with wins over Leo Borg, Cameron Norrie, Mariano Navone in a marathon match lasting four hours, and Duje Ajduković. He lost to Nuno Borges in straight sets.

Nadal then competed in the Summer Olympics, where he served as a torch bearer during the opening ceremony. In singles, he lost in the second round to eventual champion Novak Djokovic in their record 60th professional meeting. In the doubles with Alcaraz, he reached the quarterfinals.

On 10 October 2024, Nadal stated his intention to retire from the sport after playing for Spain in the Davis Cup Finals in Málaga, Spain, in November. Later that month he participated in the 6 Kings Slam exhibition tournament, losing his matches against Alcaraz and Djokovic.

At the Davis Cup Finals in Málaga, Botic van de Zandschulp beat Nadal as Spain lost to the Netherlands in the quarterfinals. After the conclusion of the tie, Nadal gave a speech and a video montage was played of career highlights and personal messages, including from Federer, Djokovic, Serena Williams, Andy Murray, footballer Andrés Iniesta and golfer Sergio García.

== Rivalries ==
"It's true that with Novak I played more matches than with Roger, but I started it with him (Federer). Someone I have admired, whom I have rivaled and also with whom I have shared many beautiful things on and off the court. A part of my life left with him."

— Nadal, on his rivalry with Roger Federer following his retirement in November 2022.

=== Nadal vs. Federer ===
Roger Federer and Nadal played each other from 2004 to 2019, and their rivalry was a significant part of both men's careers. They held the top two rankings on the ATP Tour from July 2005 to 14 August 2009, and again from 11 September 2017 to 15 October 2018. They are the only pair of men to be consistently ranked in the Top 2 for four years continuously (from July 2005 to August 2009). Nadal ascended to No. 2 in July 2005 and held this spot for a record 160 consecutive weeks before surpassing Federer in August 2008. Nadal and Federer are also the only pair of men to have ever finished six consecutive calendar years at the top 2 positions (from 2005 to 2010).

Nadal and Federer faced each other 40 times, with Nadal leading 24–16 overall and 10–4 in Grand Slam matches. Nadal had a winning record on clay (14–2) and outdoor hard courts (8–6), while Federer led on indoor hard courts (5–1) and grass (3–1).

24 of their matches were in tournament finals, including a joint-record nine major finals (tied with Djokovic–Nadal). From 2006 to 2008, they played in every French Open and Wimbledon final, and also met in the title matches of the 2009 Australian Open, the 2011 French Open and the 2017 Australian Open. Nadal won six of the nine, losing the first two Wimbledon finals and 2017 in Australia. Four of these matches were five-set matches (2007 and 2008 Wimbledon, 2009 and 2017 Australian Open), and the 2008 Wimbledon final has been lauded as the greatest match ever. Nadal was the only player to defeat Federer in the final of a major on all three surfaces (grass, hard court, and clay).

=== Nadal vs. Djokovic ===
Novak Djokovic and Nadal met 60 times, more than any other pair in the Open Era. Nadal led 11–7 at Grand Slam events but trailed 29–31 overall. They played a record 18 Grand Slam matches and a joint-record nine Grand Slam tournament finals (tied with Nadal–Federer). Nadal led on clay (20–9), while Djokovic led on hard courts (20–7), and they were tied 2–2 on grass. In 2009, this rivalry was listed as the third greatest of the previous 10 years by ATPworldtour.com. Djokovic was one of only two players to win at least ten match wins against Nadal alongside Federer. They also played in a record 14 ATP Masters finals.

In their first Grand Slam final at the 2010 US Open, Nadal beat Djokovic in four sets, achieving the career Grand Slam. In 2011–12, they contested four consecutive major finals, with Djokovic winning the first three at Wimbledon, the US Open, and the Australian Open, the last being the longest Grand Slam final in history at 5 hours and 53 minutes. It remains the longest match of both Nadal and Djokovic's careers, and the only time Nadal lost a major final after winning the first set. In 2013, Djokovic defeated Nadal in straight sets in the final at Monte Carlo, ending Nadal's record eight consecutive titles there, but Nadal earned revenge in the French Open semifinals in an epic five-setter. Later that year, Nadal defeated Djokovic in the US Open final to complete the Summer Slam.

Many of their matches are considered among the greatest in tennis history by analysts, such as 2009 Madrid Masters semifinal, 2011 Miami Masters final, the 2012 Australian Open final, the 2013 French Open semifinal, 2018 Wimbledon semifinal, and the 2021 French Open semifinal.

== Legacy ==
Nadal is, without a doubt, the best athlete in the history of Spain. Spain has to pay him a tribute for many, many years. Nadal is the king of Roland Garros and of world tennis. He has achieved a record that is very difficult to beat.

— Felipe VI, on Nadal's legacy after he won his 22nd Grand Slam at the French Open in 2022.

Nadal won the second-most major men's singles titles (22) in tennis history and the second-most "Big" titles (59) since 1990. He appeared in the Top 10 of the ATP rankings consecutively from April 2005 to March 2023 – a record 912 weeks. He stands alone in the Open Era as the player with the most clay court titles (63), consisting of an all-time record 14 French Open titles, 12 Barcelona Open titles, 11 Monte-Carlo Masters titles, and 10 Italian Open titles. His 14 French Open titles are a record at any single tournament, and he holds Open Era records for the longest single-surface win streak in matches (81 on clay) and in sets (50 on clay). Nadal holds the men's all-time records for the most majors won without losing a set (4), the most match wins at a single major (112 at the French Open), and the highest match-winning percentage at clay court majors (96.6%), among many others. Nadal's dominance on clay is reflected by his honorific title as the "King of Clay", (Note: See:) and he is widely regarded as the greatest clay-court player in history. (Note: See:) Nadal is considered by many to be the greatest player in tennis history. (Note: See:)

Nadal is one of three men, along with Agassi and Djokovic, to win the Olympic gold as well as the four majors in singles in his career, a feat known as a Career Golden Slam. He is the only man to complete the Career Grand Slam and win Olympic gold in singles and doubles. (Note: Laurence Doherty, Charles Winslow, Vincent Richards, and Nicolás Massú are the only other male players in history who have won an Olympic gold medal in both singles and doubles in their careers, however, they never completed the Career Grand Slam.) He is one of four men to complete the double Career Grand Slam in singles.

Nadal was the Laureus World Sportsman of the Year in 2011 and 2021, and was 2010 BBC Overseas Sports Personality of the Year. He is an honorary recipient of the Grand Cross of Royal Order of Sports Merit, Grand Cross of Order of the Second of May, the Grand Cross of Naval Merit, the Princess of Asturias Award, and the Medal of the City of Paris. He was ranked as one of the world's highest-paid athletes by Forbes magazine in 2014 and named among the 100 most influential people in the world by Time magazine in 2022.

In 2019, former world No. 1 and 1995 French Open champion Thomas Muster stated: "Rafael Nadal is the best clay-court player ever". Former world No. 1 Carlos Moyá stated in 2010 that Nadal was "one of the greatest ever. But he is on his way to become, who knows, maybe the greatest". Former world No. 1 Juan Carlos Ferrero: "Rafa is the king of knowing how to adapt to any situation in the match". Former world No. 1 and rival Djokovic: "Our encounters have made me the player I am today". Former world No. 1 and rival Roger Federer: "I have always had the utmost respect for my friend Rafa as a person and as a champion. I believe we have pushed each other to become better players".

Nadal played an instrumental role in the sport's revival, ushering in a Golden Age of tennis, which saw increased interest and higher revenues. His rivalries with Djokovic and Federer are considered to be among the greatest rivalries in sports history.

== Player profile ==
=== Playing style ===
Nadal generally played an aggressive, behind-the-baseline game based on heavy topspin groundstrokes, consistency and shrewd court coverage; an aggressive counterpuncher.

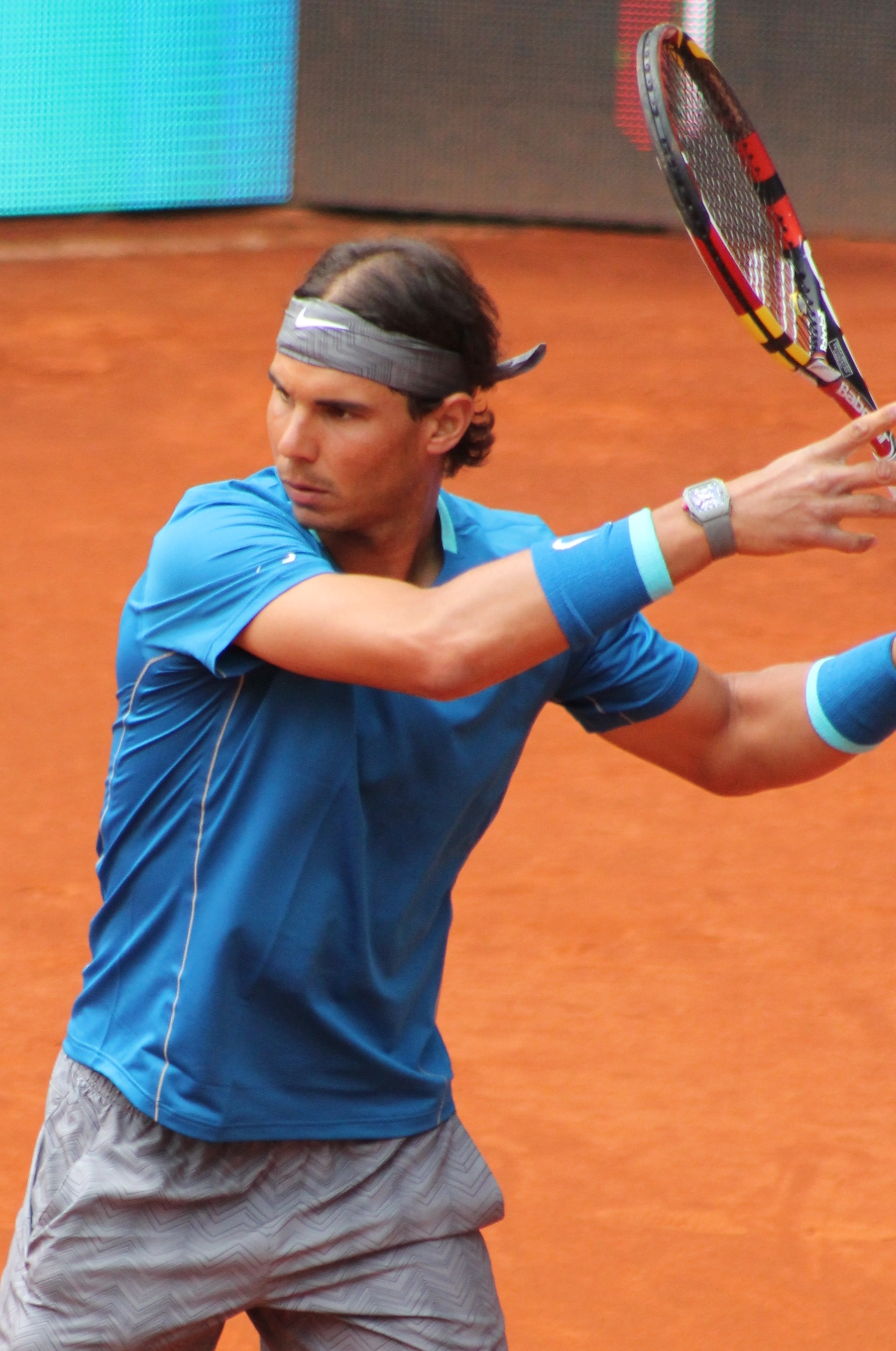
Nadal hitting a forehand

Known for his athleticism and speed around the court in his 20s, Nadal has been called "the best defender in tennis" who hit well on the run, constructing winning plays from seemingly defensive positions. He also played very fine dropshots, which worked well because his heavy topspin often forced opponents to the back of the court.

Nadal employed a semi-western grip forehand, often with a "lasso-whip" follow-through, where his left arm hit through the ball and finished above his left shoulder. Nadal's forehand allowed him to hit shots with heavy topspin – more so than his contemporaries.

San Francisco tennis researcher John Yandell used a high-speed video camera and special software to count the average number of revolutions of a tennis ball hit full force by Nadal. Yandell concluded:

The first guys we did were Sampras and Agassi. They were hitting forehands that in general were spinning about 1,800 to 1,900 revolutions per minute. Federer is hitting with an amazing amount of spin, too, right? 2,700 revolutions per minute. Well, we measured one forehand Nadal hit at 4,900. His average was 3,200.

While Nadal's shots tended to land short of the baseline, the characteristically high bounces his forehands achieved tended to mitigate the advantage an opponent would normally gain from capitalizing on a short ball. Although his forehand was based on heavy topspin, he hit the ball deep and flat with a more orthodox follow through for clean winners, but instead of being admired for his finesse and angles, it was the brutality of his groundstrokes that caught the public eye.

Nadal's serve was considered a weak point in his game, although his high number of first-serve points won and break points saved allowed him to consistently compete for and win major titles on faster surfaces. Before the 2010 US Open, he altered his service motion. He arrived in the trophy pose earlier, pulled the racket lower during the trophy pose and modified his service grip to a more continental one, He increased his average speed by around 10 mph during the 2010 US Open, maxing out at 135 mph (217 km/h), allowing him to win more free points on his serve. After the 2010 US Open, Nadal's serve speed dropped to previous levels and was again cited as in need of improvement. From 2019 onwards, several analysts praised Nadal's improvement on the serve, noting the speed of his serve had increased.

Nadal, a clay court maestro, was also successful on hard courts. However, Nadal himself admitted that playing a lot on them is tiring and takes a physical toll on ATP Tour players, so he repeatedly requested for a reevaluated tour schedule featuring fewer hard court tournaments and increasing the weeks of rest.

Early in his career some questioned his longevity in the sport, citing his build and playing style as conducive to injury. After winning the 2010 US Open, former world No. 1 Pete Sampras stated: "The only question with Rafa is physically how much his body can handle the pounding with how hard he works for every point. You just watch him play, the kid is relentless". This "longevity" narrative was proven inaccurate, and pundits later admired his resilience to come back from devastating injuries and his ability to play with physical pain.

=== Attitude and demeanor ===
Freezing cold water. I do this before every match. It's the point before the point of no return. Under the cold shower I enter a new space in which I feel my power and resilience grow. I'm a different man when I emerge. I'm activated. I'm in "the flow"... Nothing else exists but the battle ahead.

— Nadal, on his pre-match rituals.

Despite his success, his uncle Toni ensured that Nadal remained as normal, modest, and down to earth as possible and believed these qualities had a tremendous impact on his results and motivation. He rarely if ever touted his achievements, refused to put down his rivals, and lingered after matches and practices to sign autographs. For instance, in 2007, Nadal would often interrupt his training sessions on the public courts of Manacor, just to hit a few balls with fans and foreign tourists that had asked him to, even though they were not very good, and even against his uncle Toni's wishes.

Nadal was also noted for his visceral delight in competing, whether he won or lost. He also had a rare philosophical approach to tennis and life that one sportswriter described as a "model of humility, empathy, and perspective".

In an interview for the Netflix documentary Rafa, Nadal revealed that he sought psychiatric support and received medication during his below expectation year of 2015. He reported that this schedule helped him improve from his psychological issues during the season.

Nadal was known for his on-court rituals including specific bodily movements and the positioning of items courtside. At changeovers, he always waited until his opponent crossed the net, refused to step on the lines, and lined up his drinks bottles in precise positions near his chair, labels always facing out, before stepping back into action. His water-bottle routine was so well known that when they fell over during a match at the 2015 Australian Open, a ball boy dashed over to return the bottles to their upright position, with the labels facing the court as Nadal had intended. Nadal explained that such rituals were meant to work as a psychological mechanism to help him stay calm in stressful situations.

There was a pattern to the way he approached a serve. He usually took three balls, examined them, discarded one, shook the strands of hair that were not corralled by his headband out of his eyes, and then served. Nadal's extensive time taken between points received criticism from other players including Roger Federer and Denis Shapovalov, with the latter wanting Nadal to be given a code violation for pushing the 25-second serve clock to the limit, stating that he was being given preferential treatment because of his status in the game.

=== Coaching and personal team ===
Nadal's first and most important coach was his paternal uncle Toni Nadal, who coached him from 1990 to 2017 (aged 4 to 31). Though strong physically as a player, Toni Nadal struggled to be aggressive with his forehand and possessed no big shots. Along with working on the mental and physical sides, he ensured that his nephew developed a good technical, all-round aggressive game, became competent at the net, and developed his forehand into a weapon.

Aged 12, Nadal began attending the Balearic Islands training centre 50 kilometers away from Manacor in Palma. He and his uncle trained there three times a week, so that Nadal could train with the best boys in the Balearic Islands. There, he was trained along with his uncle Toni, by Toni Colom, who travelled with Nadal at mainly Futures events for the next four years, between 1999 and 2003. Colom explained that he "was traveling to those tournaments because I had a bigger availability of traveling [than Toni] and not because I was more experienced". After 2005, Nadal left the structure of the Balearic School and created his own team.

Nadal worked with the same team from 2006 to 2017, which consisted of members from his family and professional staff, whom Nadal also considered his family. Besides Toni, the first members of his team were Joan Forcades, Nadal's instructor since childhood, and doctor Ángel Ruiz Cotorro. Cotorro, who also worked with Juan Martín del Potro and Arantxa Sánchez Vicario, helped him play after facing injuries and his suggestions were pivotal to his game. Nadal said of his doctor that: "I trust Dr. Cotorro with my life". Forcades was the lead fitness expert for Nadal and developed his training program.

Toni has described his coaching style as 'hard', saying that he occasionally put too much pressure on Nadal, but that he did so because he wanted him to succeed. Together, they won 16 major titles between 2005 and 2017, making them the second most successful tennis coach-player partnership only behind Marián Vajda and Novak Djokovic.

Carlos Costa was Nadal's agent from 2005. In 2006, Costa and Nadal's father convinced Benito Pérez Barbadillo, who had been working as the press officer of the ATP since the late 1990s, to open his own company (B1PR) to work with them as Nadal's communications director (PR manager). Nadal then hired physiotherapist Rafael Maymó, who designed his physical preparation with Forcades and who was one of Nadal's closest friends, thus also acting as a psychologist.

After signing his new coach Carlos Moyá in December 2016, Nadal's game style acquired a more offensive approach. Under Moyá's direction, Nadal improved his serve, and incorporated serve-and-volley as a surprise tactic in some of his matches. Moyá, who has known Nadal since he was 12, was more a friend than a coach, and when he realized that Nadal was going through a bad time, he left his duty as a coach and acted like a friend with whom Nadal could speak to.

Francisco Roig, who was hired by Nadal in 2005, acted as the alternate coach.

=== Equipment and apparel ===
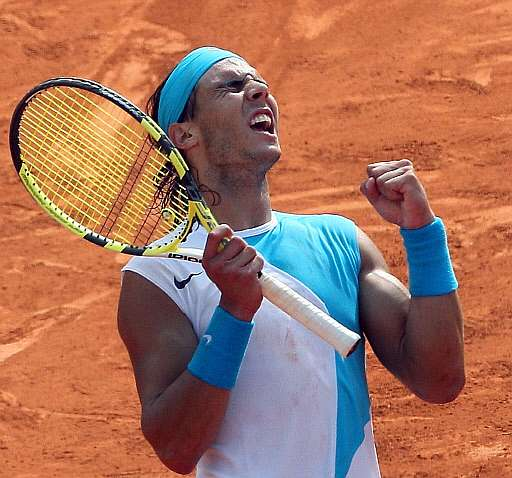
Nadal wearing his signature Nike sleeveless shirt at the French Open in 2007, while holding his Babolat racquet

Nike served as Nadal's clothing and shoe sponsor. Nadal's signature on-court attire entailed a variety of sleeveless shirts paired with 3/4 length capri pants. For the 2009 season, Nadal adopted more-traditional on-court apparel. Nike encouraged Nadal to update his look in order to reflect his new status as the sport's top player at that time. In 2009, Nadal played matches in a polo shirt specifically designed for him by Nike, paired with shorts cut above the knee. Nadal wore Nike's Air CourtBallistec 2.3 tennis shoes, with various customizations throughout the season, including his nickname "Rafa" on the right shoe and a stylized bull logo on the left.

Nadal used an AeroPro Drive racquet with a 4 1/4-inch L2 grip. As of the 2010 season, Nadal's racquets were painted to resemble the Babolat AeroPro Drive with Cortex GT racquet in order to market a current model that Babolat sold. Nadal used no replacement grip, and instead wrapped two overgrips around the handle. He used Duralast 15L strings until the 2010 season, when he switched to Babolat's new, black-colored, RPM Blast string. Nadal's rackets were always strung at 55 lb (25 kg), regardless of which surface or conditions he played on.

== Off the court ==
=== In popular culture ===
Nadal's autobiography, Rafa, written with John Carlin, was published in 2011.

In February 2010, Rafael Nadal was featured in the music video for Shakira's "Gypsy". In 2016, Nadal was one of many celebrities appearing in the music video for RedOne's "Don't You Need Somebody".

In 2018, Nadal was featured in a new ad for the 2018 tennis game Mario Tennis Aces.

Nadal appeared in the 2024 documentary Federer: Twelve Final Days about Roger Federer's final tournament before his retirement, the 2022 Laver Cup.

=== Tributes and honors ===
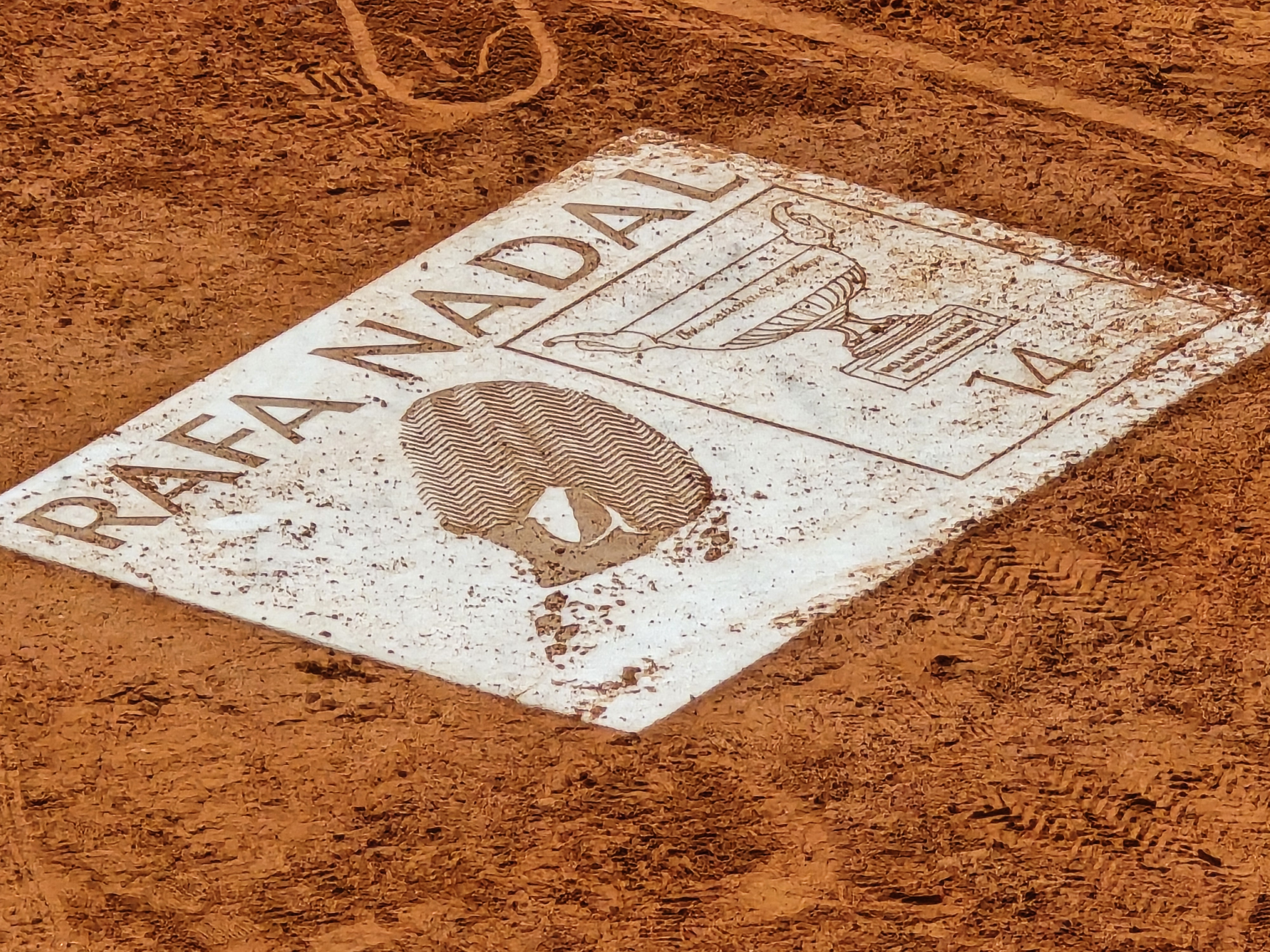
Commemorative plaque to Rafael Nadal unveiled at the Court Philippe Chatrier during a tribute at the 2025 French Open

In April 2017, the centre court of the Barcelona Open was named Pista Rafa Nadal. In 2021, prior to the tournament, the French Open paid tribute to Nadal by installing a statue at Stade Roland Garros, created by Spanish sculptor Jordi Díez Fernández. 128036 Rafaelnadal is an asteroid discovered in 2003 and named after Nadal.

At both the London and Rio Olympic Games, Nadal was chosen as Spain's flag bearer. Although he had to forfeit the role in 2012 due to injury, he carried the flag during the opening ceremony of the 2016 Games.

In 2025, on the first day of the 2025 French Open, a new plaque commemorating Rafael Nadal's 14 Roland Garros trophies was unveiled on the Court Philippe Chatrier stadium's soil. The ceremony occurred in the presence of Rafael Nadal, Roger Federer, Novak Djokovic, and Andy Murray, who came to pay tribute to Nadal's career.

The following month, Nadal was created Marquess of Llevant de Mallorca by King Felipe VI, becoming a member of Spanish nobility. As a marquess, he is entitled to the style of "The Most Illustrious", however, as a knight grand cross of some orders such as the Royal Order of Sports Merit and the Grand Cross of Naval Merit, he receives the higher treatment of "The Most Excellent".

=== Philanthropy ===
In November 2007, Nadal launched the nonprofit Fundación Rafa Nadal. The foundation was created to help disadvantaged children and teenagers, offering them opportunities through sports. His wife María Perelló is the director of the foundation.

In response to the 2010 Haiti earthquake, Nadal played in a special charity event alongside fellow top tennis players during the 2010 Australian Open called Hit for Haiti, with proceeds going to Haiti earthquake victims. He participated in a follow-up charity exhibition during the 2010 Indian Wells Open. In late 2010, Nadal played his rival Roger Federer in the Match for Africa exhibitions for the Roger Federer Foundation and the Rafa Nadal Foundation. The first match took place in Zürich on 21 December, and was won by Federer, while the following match was played in Madrid, and was won by Nadal.

During the Majorca flood in October 2018, Nadal, who was recovering from injury at home in Majorca, opened his tennis academy centre to the victims. One day after the flood he worked personally with some friends to help the victims, being photographed cleaning up once the flood waters had receded. Later, Nadal donated €1 million for rebuilding Sant Llorenç des Cardassar, the most affected town. Nadal also organized other charitable activities to help repair the damage of the disaster, such as the Olazábal & Nadal charity golf tournament.

To combat the ill-effects of the COVID-19 pandemic, Nadal joined with Pau Gasol and the Red Cross in June to help raise 11 million euros. In 2020, the Fundación Rafa Nadal pledged to support the Food Bank of Mallorca, announcing that it would aim to collect 3,000 kg of food to support 25,000 individuals in Mallorca.

On 6 April 2023, the Fundación Rafa Nadal announced that they would partner with UNESCO through its Fit for Life project, a sport-based flagship program designed to tackle physical inactivity, such as accelerating the recovery from COVID-19, mental health issues, and inequality. In 2024, The Rafa Nadal Foundation received the Laureus Sport for Good Award at the Laureus World Sports Awards 2024.

Nadal supports or has supported other charities, such as City Harvest, Elton John AIDS Foundation, Laureus Sport for Good Foundation and Small Steps Project. Nadal was awarded the Arthur Ashe Humanitarian of the Year award for 2011.

=== Sponsorships and endorsements ===
Nadal was sponsored by Kia Motors since 2006. He appeared in advertising campaigns for Kia as a global ambassador for the company.

He became the face of Lanvin's L'Homme Sport cologne in April 2009. Nadal was the international ambassador for Quely, a biscuit company from his native Mallorca. In 2010, luxury watchmaker Richard Mille announced that he had developed an ultra-light wristwatch in collaboration with Nadal.

Nadal was the face of Emporio Armani Underwear and Armani Jeans for the spring/summer 2011 collection. This was the first time that the label had chosen a tennis player for the job.

In June 2012, Nadal joined the group of sports endorsers of the PokerStars online poker cardroom. Nadal won a charity poker tournament against retired Brazilian football player Ronaldo in 2014.

In August 2023, Nadal signed up as the brand ambassador for the Indian IT major Infosys.

=== Rafa Nadal Sports Centre ===
Nadal owns and trained at the Rafa Nadal Sports Centre (40,000 m^{2}, 430,000 sq ft) in his hometown of Manacor, Mallorca. The centre houses the Rafa Nadal Academy, where the American International School of Mallorca is located. The academy is used by both young Spanish tennis players as well as players from other countries. For instance, in 2017, the Australian tennis federation agreed to partner with Nadal's Academy to allow their players use it as their European training base. Nadal's coach and uncle Toni Nadal is the head of the academy, his agent Carlos Costa is the head of business development, and fellow Majorcan Carlos Moyá is involved as a technical director.

In 2021, a four-episode series about the Rafa Nadal Academy was aired on Amazon Prime and Movistar and was broadcast in 244 countries. Nadal also owns and operates three other similar facilities: the Rafa Nadal Academy Kuwait, the Rafa Nadal Tennis Centre Mexico and the Rafa Nadal Tennis Centre Greece. The Mexico and Greece Centres opened in 2019 and the Kuwait Academy opened in 2020.

As of 2024, Nadal will promote tennis in Saudi Arabia and open a Rafa Nadal Academy there.

=== Involvement in football and other sports ===
Nadal is an avid football fan and his favorite clubs are RCD Mallorca and Real Madrid CF, stating "when my uncle (Miguel Ángel) was playing for Barcelona, we wanted Barcelona to win. Before that, my whole family was for Real Madrid. After my uncle left the Barcelona team, then we're all for the Real Madrid again. I have got nothing against Barcelona, but I prefer Real Madrid to win". He is a fervent supporter of the Spanish national team, and he was one of six people not affiliated with the team or the national federation allowed to enter the team's locker room following Spain's victory in the 2010 FIFA World Cup Final. Nadal has made several honorary kick-offs for various teams.

In December 2007, in the "Friends of Iker v Friends of Rafa" charity sports event, the two teams contested a tennis match and a football match. In December 2008, Nadal and Casillas staged a similar event, this time including an indoor football match, a tennis match, and a go-kart race.

In July 2010, it was reported that he had become a shareholder of RCD Mallorca (owning 10%). He was offered the role of vice president, which he rejected. His uncle Miguel Ángel Nadal became assistant coach. Shortly after acquiring his interest in Mallorca, Nadal called out UEFA for apparent hypocrisy in ejecting the club from the 2010–11 UEFA Europa League for excessive debts.

Nadal enjoys playing golf and poker. In October 2020, Nadal competed in the professional-level Balearic Golf Championship, obtaining a World Amateur Golf Ranking in the process.

In November 2026, Real Madrid CF had announced that they had agreed to appoint Nadal as one of its newest members of its board of directors, being successfully elected to the Board of Directors on 21 November 2026.

== Personal life ==
I love fishing for three reasons: the calm and tranquillity, the beauty of the sea – and, of course, the satisfaction of catching your dinner. I can forget about everything. No one can call me, because I keep my mobile switched off, so I can relax and not think about tennis.

— Nadal, on his love for fishing in his leisure time to the Daily Mail in 2007.

=== Family and beliefs ===
In June 2009, reports emerged that Nadal's parents, Ana María and Sebastián, had separated, following weeks of speculation about his recent struggles on the court. Nadal later stated "My parents' divorce made an important change in my life. It affected me. After that, I couldn't play Wimbledon, it was tough."

Nadal met his future wife, María Francisca (Mery) Perelló Pascual through his younger sister, María Isabel. They began dating in 2005, when he was 19 and she was 17, and only formalized their relationship publicly in 2007, with their engagement reported in January 2019. In October 2019, the couple was married at the La Fortaleza castle in Port de Pollença, Majorca. On 8 October 2022, they had their first child, a son. On 7 August 2025, the couple welcomed their second son.

Mery Perelló was a sports marketer in London, but as she saw Nadal's career getting bigger, she decided to help his off-court business. She now serves as the director of Fundación Rafa Nadal.

Nadal was raised a Catholic, but now identifies as an agnostic atheist.

Nadal's native languages are Spanish and Balearic Catalan; he speaks conversational English.

=== Residences ===
When Nadal was aged 10 to 21, the extended Nadal family shared a five-storey, family-owned apartment building in Manacor. In 2012, Nadal purchased a house in Porto Cristo for about 4 million euros, located near his family home. Around the time he won the 2012 French Open, Nadal acquired a vacation home, a two-storey villa in Playa Nueva Romana, in the Dominican Republic, for about 2 million euros.

=== Other endeavors ===
As a young boy, he would run home from school to watch his favorite Japanese anime, Dragon Ball, and CNN dubbed him "the Dragon Ball of tennis" for his unorthodox style.

Off the court, his sister described him as "a bit of a scaredy cat". Since childhood, he has had a fear of the dark, preferring to sleep with a light or television on. Nadal is afraid of deep water, dogs, and thunderstorms, and is nervous about riding a bicycle.

Despite playing tennis left-handed, Nadal is right-handed in other activities.

=== Health ===
Throughout his career, Nadal had chronic knee injuries, sidelining him from multiple tournaments. In late 2012, Nadal received over six months of physical therapy, along with platelet-rich plasma (PRP) therapy, a non-surgical treatment that had been previously disallowed by the World Anti-Doping Agency.

Nadal has a rare chronic disorder of his left ankle, Mueller-Weiss syndrome, diagnosed age 19. He received anesthetic injections en route to winning the 2022 French Open.

== Career statistics ==
=== Grand Slam tournament performance timeline ===
Key
| W | F | SF | QF | #R | RR | Q# | DNQ | A | NH |

(W) winner; (F) finalist; (SF) semifinalist; (QF) quarterfinalist; (#R) rounds 4, 3, 2, 1; (RR) round-robin stage; (Q#) qualification round; (DNQ) did not qualify; (A) absent; (NH) not held; (SR) strike rate (events won / competed); (W–L) win–loss record.
To avoid confusion and double counting, these charts are updated at the conclusion of a tournament or when the player's participation has ended.

| Tournament | 2003 | 2004 | 2005 | 2006 | 2007 | 2008 | 2009 | 2010 | 2011 | 2012 | 2013 | 2014 | 2015 | 2016 | 2017 | 2018 | 2019 | 2020 | 2021 | 2022 | 2023 | 2024 | SR | W–L | Win % |
|---|---|---|---|---|---|---|---|---|---|---|---|---|---|---|---|---|---|---|---|---|---|---|---|---|---|
| Australian Open | A | 3R | 4R | A | QF | SF | W | QF | QF | F | A | F | QF | 1R | F | QF | F | QF | QF | W | 2R | A | 2 / 18 | 77–16 | 83% |
| French Open | A | A | W | W | W | W | 4R | W | W | W | W | W | QF | 3R (Note: Nadal withdrew before the third round of the 2016 French Open due to a wrist injury and before the semi-finals of 2022 Wimbledon due to an abdominal tear, which do not officially count as losses.) | W | W | W | W | SF | W | A | 1R | 14 / 19 | 112–4 | 97% |
| Wimbledon | 3R | A | 2R | F | F | W | A | W | F | 2R | 1R | 4R | 2R | A | 4R | SF | SF | NH | A | SF | A | A | 2 / 15 | 58–12 | 83% |
| US Open | 2R | 2R | 3R | QF | 4R | SF | SF | W | F | A | W | A | 3R | 4R | W | SF | W | A | A | 4R | A | A | 4 / 16 | 67–12 | 85% |
| Win–loss | 3–2 | 3–2 | 13–3 | 17–2 | 20–3 | 24–2 | 15–2 | 25–1 | 23–3 | 14–2 | 14–1 | 16–2 | 11–4 | 5–2 | 23–2 | 21–3 | 24–2 | 11–1 | 9–2 | 22–1 | 1–1 | 0–1 | 22 / 68 | 314–44 | 88% |

Nadal's 22 Grand Slam singles titles place him second in the men's all-time rankings, behind Djokovic's 24 titles. His 30 Grand Slam singles finals place him 3rd in the men's all-time rankings, behind Djokovic's 38 and Federer's 31 finals, respectively. He has won 14 French Open titles, an all-time record at any tournament. He was also the youngest player in the Open Era to win all four majors (24 years old) until his compatriot Carlos Alcaraz completed the feat at 22 years old in 2026. In doing so, Alcaraz also broke Nadal's record for the number of majors competed in before achieving the Career Grand Slam; Nadal took 20 campaigns, while Alcaraz took 12.

=== Grand Slam tournament finals: 30 (22 titles, 8 runner-ups) ===
| Result | Year | Tournament | Surface | Opponent | Score |
|---|---|---|---|---|---|
| Win | 2005 | French Open | Clay | (Argentina) Mariano Puerta | 6–7^{(6–8)}, 6–3, 6–1, 7–5 |
| Win | 2006 | French Open (2) | Clay | (Switzerland) Roger Federer | 1–6, 6–1, 6–4, 7–6^{(7–4)} |
| Loss | 2006 | Wimbledon | Grass | (Switzerland) Roger Federer | 0–6, 6–7^{(5–7)}, 7–6^{(7–2)}, 3–6 |
| Win | 2007 | French Open (3) | Clay | (Switzerland) Roger Federer (2) | 6–3, 4–6, 6–3, 6–4 |
| Loss | 2007 | Wimbledon | Grass | (Switzerland) Roger Federer | 6–7^{(7–9)}, 6–4, 6–7^{(3–7)}, 6–2, 2–6 |
| Win | 2008 | French Open (4) | Clay | (Switzerland) Roger Federer (3) | 6–1, 6–3, 6–0 |
| Win | 2008 | Wimbledon | Grass | (Switzerland) Roger Federer (4) | 6–4, 6–4, 6–7^{(5–7)}, 6–7^{(8–10)}, 9–7 |
| Win | 2009 | Australian Open | Hard | (Switzerland) Roger Federer (5) | 7–5, 3–6, 7–6^{(7–3)}, 3–6, 6–2 |
| Win | 2010 | French Open (5) | Clay | (Sweden) Robin Söderling | 6–4, 6–2, 6–4 |
| Win | 2010 | Wimbledon (2) | Grass | (Czech Republic) Tomáš Berdych | 6–3, 7–5, 6–4 |
| Win | 2010 | US Open | Hard | (Serbia) Novak Djokovic | 6–4, 5–7, 6–4, 6–2 |
| Win | 2011 | French Open (6) | Clay | (Switzerland) Roger Federer (6) | 7–5, 7–6^{(7–3)}, 5–7, 6–1 |
| Loss | 2011 | Wimbledon | Grass | (Serbia) Novak Djokovic | 4–6, 1–6, 6–1, 3–6 |
| Loss | 2011 | US Open | Hard | (Serbia) Novak Djokovic | 2–6, 4–6, 7–6^{(7–3)}, 1–6 |
| Loss | 2012 | Australian Open | Hard | (Serbia) Novak Djokovic | 7–5, 4–6, 2–6, 7–6^{(7–5)}, 5–7 |
| Win | 2012 | French Open (7) | Clay | (Serbia) Novak Djokovic | 6–4, 6–3, 2–6, 7–5 |
| Win | 2013 | French Open (8) | Clay | (Spain) David Ferrer | 6–3, 6–2, 6–3 |
| Win | 2013 | US Open (2) | Hard | (Serbia) Novak Djokovic | 6–2, 3–6, 6–4, 6–1 |
| Loss | 2014 | Australian Open | Hard | (Switzerland) Stan Wawrinka | 3–6, 2–6, 6–3, 3–6 |
| Win | 2014 | French Open (9) | Clay | (Serbia) Novak Djokovic | 3–6, 7–5, 6–2, 6–4 |
| Loss | 2017 | Australian Open | Hard | (Switzerland) Roger Federer | 4–6, 6–3, 1–6, 6–3, 3–6 |
| Win | 2017 | French Open (10) | Clay | (Switzerland) Stan Wawrinka | 6–2, 6–3, 6–1 |
| Win | 2017 | US Open (3) | Hard | (South Africa) Kevin Anderson | 6–3, 6–3, 6–4 |
| Win | 2018 | French Open (11) | Clay | (Austria) Dominic Thiem | 6–4, 6–3, 6–2 |
| Loss | 2019 | Australian Open | Hard | (Serbia) Novak Djokovic | 3–6, 2–6, 3–6 |
| Win | 2019 | French Open (12) | Clay | (Austria) Dominic Thiem | 6–3, 5–7, 6–1, 6–1 |
| Win | 2019 | US Open (4) | Hard | (Russia) Daniil Medvedev | 7–5, 6–3, 5–7, 4–6, 6–4 |
| Win | 2020 | French Open (13) | Clay | (Serbia) Novak Djokovic | 6–0, 6–2, 7–5 |
| Win | 2022 | Australian Open (2) | Hard | (Russia) Daniil Medvedev | 2–6, 6–7^{(5–7)}, 6–4, 6–4, 7–5 |
| Win | 2022 | French Open (14) | Clay | (Norway) Casper Ruud | 6–3, 6–3, 6–0 |

=== Year–end championship performance timeline ===
| Tournament | 2001 | 2002 | 2003 | 2004 | 2005 | 2006 | 2007 | 2008 | 2009 | 2010 | 2011 | 2012 | 2013 | 2014 | 2015 | 2016 | 2017 | 2018 | 2019 | 2020 | 2021 | 2022 | 2023 | 2024 | SR | W–L | Win % |
|---|---|---|---|---|---|---|---|---|---|---|---|---|---|---|---|---|---|---|---|---|---|---|---|---|---|---|---|
| ATP Finals | Did not qualify | | | | A | SF | SF | A | RR | F | RR | A | F | A | SF | A | RR | A | RR | SF | DNQ | RR | Did not qualify | | 0 / 11 | 21–18 | 54% |

=== Year-end championship finals: 2 (2 runner-ups) ===
| Result | Year | Tournament | Surface | Opponent | Score |
|---|---|---|---|---|---|
| Loss | 2010 | ATP Finals | Hard (i) | (Switzerland) Roger Federer | 3–6, 6–3, 1–6 |
| Loss | 2013 | ATP Finals | Hard (i) | (Serbia) Novak Djokovic | 3–6, 4–6 |

=== Olympic gold medal matches: 2 (2 gold medals) ===
==== Singles: 1 (1 gold medal) ====
| Result | Year | Tournament | Surface | Opponent | Score |
|---|---|---|---|---|---|
| Win | 2008 | Beijing Olympics | Hard | (Chile) Fernando González | 6–3, 7–6^{(7–2)}, 6–3 |

==== Doubles: 1 (1 gold medal) ====
| Result | Year | Tournament | Surface | Partner | Opponents | Score |
|---|---|---|---|---|---|---|
| Win | 2016 | Rio Olympics | Hard | (Spain) Marc López | (Romania) Florin Mergea (Romania) Horia Tecău | 6–2, 3–6, 6–4 |

== Records ==
=== All-time tournament records ===
| Tournament | Since | Record accomplished | Players matched |
|---|---|---|---|
| **Grand Slam** **tournaments** | 1988 | Career Golden Slam; Winning all 4 majors and the Olympic gold medal in singles | Andre Agassi; Novak Djokovic |
| **Grand Slam** **tournaments** | 1988 | Career Golden Slam + Olympic gold medal in doubles | **Stands alone** |
| **Grand Slam** **tournaments** | 1978 | Surface Slam; Winning majors on 3 different surfaces in a calendar year (2010) | Novak Djokovic |
| **Grand Slam** **tournaments** | 1877 | 14 singles titles at one major – French Open | **Stands alone** |
| **Grand Slam** **tournaments** | 1877 | 14 finals contested at one major – French Open | **Stands alone** |
| **Grand Slam** **tournaments** | 1877 | 112 match wins at one major – French Open | **Stands alone** |
| **Grand Slam** **tournaments** | 1925 | 112 match wins at clay court majors | **Stands alone** |
| **Grand Slam** **tournaments** | 1925 | 96.6% match-winning percentage at clay court majors | **Stands alone** |
| **Grand Slam** **tournaments** | 1925 | 4 French–US title doubles (2010, 2013, 2017, 2019) | **Stands alone** |
| **Grand Slam** **tournaments** | 1877 | 15 years winning 1+ title (2005–2014, 2017–2020, 2022) | **Stands alone** |
| **Grand Slam** **tournaments** | 1877 | 10 consecutive years winning 1+ title (2005–2014) | **Stands alone** |
| **Grand Slam** **tournaments** | 1877 | 10 title defences (2006–08, 2011–14, 2018–2020) | Roger Federer |
| **Grand Slam** **tournaments** | 1877 | 10 title defences at one major – French Open | **Stands alone** |
| **Grand Slam** **tournaments** | 1877 | 4 titles without losing a set | **Stands alone** |
| **Grand Slam** **tournaments** | 1877 | 4 titles without losing a set at one major – French Open | **Stands alone** |
| **Grand Slam** **tournaments** | 1877 | 3+ titles in 3 separate decades (2000s – 6, 2010s – 13, 2020s – 3) | **Stands alone** |
| **Grand Slam** **tournaments** | 1877 | 2+ titles in 3 separate decades | **Stands alone** |
| **Grand Slam** **tournaments** | 1877 | Won the same major twice in 3 separate decades – French Open | **Stands alone** |
| **Grand Slam** **tournaments** | 1877 | Longest Grand Slam final by duration (5 hours 53 minutes) | Novak Djokovic |
| **French Open** | 1891 | 14 men's singles titles | **Stands alone** |
| **French Open** | 1891 | 14 finals overall (2005–08, 2010–14, 2017–19, 2020, 2022) | **Stands alone** |
| **French Open** | 1891 | 5 consecutive titles (2010–14) | **Stands alone** |
| **French Open** | 1891 | 10 title defences (2006–08, 2011–14, 2018–2020) | **Stands alone** |
| **French Open** | 1891 | 4 titles without dropping a set (2008, 2010, 2017, 2020) | **Stands alone** |
| **French Open** | 1891 | 112 match wins | **Stands alone** |
| **French Open** | 1891 | 39 match win streak (2010–15) | **Stands alone** |
| **French Open** | 1891 | 96.6% match-winning percentage | **Stands alone** |
| **French Open** | 1891 | 2+ titles in 3 separate decades (2000s – 4, 2010s – 8, 2020s – 2) | **Stands alone** |
| **French Open** | 1891 | 1+ title in 3 separate decades | **Stands alone** |
| **Australian Open** | 1905 | Longest final by duration (5 hours 53 minutes) | Novak Djokovic |
| **All Tournaments / ATP Tour** | 2009 | Clay Slam; Winning Monte Carlo, Madrid, Rome, and French Open in a calendar year (2010) | **Stands alone** |
| **All Tournaments / ATP Tour** | 1899 | Summer Slam (Note: Also referred to as the "North American Hardcourt Slam".); Winning Canada, Cincinnati, and US Open in a calendar year (2013) | Patrick Rafter; Andy Roddick |
| **All Tournaments / ATP Tour** | 1973 | 23 match wins against world No. 1 players | **Stands alone** |
| **All Tournaments / ATP Tour** | 1973 | No.1 in 3 different decades (2000s, 2010s and 2020s) | **Stands alone** |
| **All Tournaments / ATP Tour** | 1973 | 912 consecutive weeks in the Top 10 | **Stands alone** |
| **All Tournaments / ATP Tour** | 1973 | 18 consecutive years in the Top 10 | **Stands alone** |
| **ATP Finals** | 1970 | 16 consecutive years qualifying for the ATP Finals (2005–2020) | **Stands alone** |
| **ATP Masters 1000** | 1990 | 11 titles won at a single tournament – Monte Carlo | **Stands alone** |
| **ATP Masters 1000** | 1990 | 12 finals contested at a single tournament – Monte Carlo and Rome | Novak Djokovic |
| **ATP Masters 1000** | 1990 | 8 consecutive titles won at a single tournament – Monte Carlo (2005–2012) | **Stands alone** |
| **ATP Masters 1000** | 1990 | 26 clay court titles overall | **Stands alone** |
| **ATP Masters 1000** | 1990 | 9 title defences at a single tournament – Monte Carlo | **Stands alone** |
| **ATP Masters 1000** | 1990 | 10+ titles at two tournaments – Monte Carlo and Rome | **Stands alone** |
| **ATP Masters 1000** | 1990 | 7 years winning 3+ titles (2005–2018) | **Stands alone** |
| **ATP Masters 1000** | 1990 | 15 years winning 1+ title (2005–2021) | **Stands alone** |
| **ATP Masters 1000** | 1990 | 10 consecutive years winning 1+ title (2005–2014) | **Stands alone** |
| **ATP Masters 1000** | 1990 | 73 match wins at a single tournament – Monte Carlo | **Stands alone** |
| **ATP Masters 1000** | 1990 | 46 consecutive match wins at a single tournament – Monte Carlo (2005–2013) | **Stands alone** |
| **ATP Masters 1000** | 1990 | 79 matches played at a single tournament – Monte Carlo | Roger Federer |
| **ATP Masters 1000** | 1990 | 20+ finals reached on two different surfaces (hard – 20, clay – 33) | **Stands alone** |
| **ATP Masters 1000** | 1990 | 99 quarterfinals | **Stands alone** |
| **ATP Masters 1000** | 1990 | 21 consecutive quarterfinals (2008–2010) | **Stands alone** |
| **ATP Masters 1000** | 1990 | 82.00% match-winning percentage | **Stands alone** |
| **ATP 500 Series** | 1990 | 12 titles won at a single tournament – Barcelona | **Stands alone** |
| **ATP 500 Series** | 1990 | 15 titles won without losing a set | **Stands alone** |
| **ATP 500 Series** | 1990 | 14 consecutive years winning 1+ title (2005–2018) | **Stands alone** |
| **ATP 500 Series** | 1990 | 66 match wins at a single tournament – Barcelona | **Stands alone** |
| **ATP 500 Series** | 1990 | 41 consecutive match wins at a single tournament – Barcelona | **Stands alone** |
| **ATP 500 Series** | 1990 | 70 matches played at a single tournament – Barcelona | **Stands alone** |
| **Monte Carlo Masters** | 1897 | 11 men's singles titles | **Stands alone** |
| **Monte Carlo Masters** | 1897 | 12 finals overall (2005–2013, 2016–18) | **Stands alone** |
| **Monte Carlo Masters** | 1897 | 8 consecutive titles (2005–2012) | **Stands alone** |
| **Monte Carlo Masters** | 1897 | 9 consecutive finals (2005–2013) | **Stands alone** |
| **Monte Carlo Masters** | 1897 | 5 titles without dropping a set (2007–08, 2010, 2012, 2018) | **Stands alone** |
| **Monte Carlo Masters** | 1897 | 73 matches wins (2005–2021) | **Stands alone** |
| **Monte Carlo Masters** | 1897 | 46 match win streak (2005–2013) | **Stands alone** |
| **Monte Carlo Masters** | 1897 | 79 matches played (2005–2021) | **Stands alone** |
| **Monte Carlo Masters** | 1897 | 17 editions played (2003–2021) | Fabrice Santoro |
| **Barcelona Open** | 1953 | 12 men's singles titles | **Stands alone** |
| **Barcelona Open** | 1953 | 12 finals overall (2005–09, 2011–13, 2016–18, 2021) | **Stands alone** |
| **Barcelona Open** | 1953 | 5 consecutive titles (2005–09) | **Stands alone** |
| **Barcelona Open** | 1953 | 9 titles without dropping a set (2005, 2007, 2009, 2011–13, 2016–18) | **Stands alone** |
| **Barcelona Open** | 1953 | 3 three-peats (2005–09, 2011–13, 2016–18) | **Stands alone** |
| **Italian Open** | 1930 | 10 men's singles titles | **Stands alone** |
| **Italian Open** | 1930 | 12 finals overall (2005–07, 2009–2014, 2018–19, 2021) | Novak Djokovic |
| **Italian Open** | 1930 | 3 consecutive titles (2005–07) | **Stands alone** |
| **Italian Open** | 1930 | 6 consecutive finals (2009–2014) | **Stands alone** |
| **Italian Open** | 1930 | 69 match wins (2005–2022) | **Stands alone** |
| **Italian Open** | 1930 | 17 consecutive match wins (2005–07) | **Stands alone** |
| **Madrid Open** | 2002 | 5 men's singles titles | **Stands alone** |
| **Madrid Open** | 2002 | 8 finals overall (2005, 2009–2011, 2013–15, 2017) | **Stands alone** |
| **Madrid Open** | 2002 | 2 consecutive titles (2013–14) | **Stands alone** |
| **Madrid Open** | 2002 | 3 consecutive finals (2009–2011 & 2013–15) | **Stands alone** |
| **Mexican Open** | 1993 | 4 men's singles titles | David Ferrer; Thomas Muster |
| **Mexican Open** | 1993 | 5 finals overall (2005, 2013, 2017, 2020, 2022) | David Ferrer |
| **Mexican Open** | 1993 | 4 titles without dropping a set (2005, 2013, 2020, 2022) | **Stands alone** |

=== Open Era records ===
- These records were attained in the Open Era of tennis.
- Records in **bold** indicate peer-less achievements.
- Records in italics are currently active streaks.
- ^ Denotes consecutive streak.

| Time span | Selected Grand Slam tournament records | Players matched | Ref. |
|---|---|---|---|
| 2005 French Open – 2010 US Open | Career Golden Slam | Andre Agassi; Novak Djokovic | |
| 2005 French Open – 2010 US Open | Youngest to achieve a Career Golden Slam (24) | **Stands alone** | |
| 2010 French Open – 2010 US Open | Surface Slam | Novak Djokovic | |
| 2010 French Open – 2010 US Open | Simultaneous holder of majors on clay, grass, and hard courts | Novak Djokovic | |
| 2008 French Open – 2008 Wimbledon, 2010 French Open – 2010 Wimbledon | Channel Slam; Winning French Open and Wimbledon consecutively in a calendar year | Rod Laver; Björn Borg; Roger Federer; Novak Djokovic; Carlos Alcaraz | |
| 2008 French Open – 2008 Summer Olympics | Simultaneous holder of Olympic gold medal in singles and majors on clay and grass courts | **Stands alone** | |
| 2010 French Open — 2018 French Open | 16 semifinals won spanning non-consecutive tournaments | **Stands alone** | |
| 2007 French Open – 2020 French Open | 8 major finals reached without losing a set (Note: The finals Nadal reached without losing a set were the 2007, 2008, 2010, 2012, 2017, and 2020 French Opens, the 2010 US Open, and the 2019 Australian Open.) | **Stands alone** | |
| 2011 Wimbledon – 2012 Australian Open | 3 consecutive runners-up finishes at majors | **Stands alone** | |
| 2005 French Open – 2022 French Open | Longest span between titles (16 years 11 months 30 days) | **Stands alone** | |
| 2005 French Open – 2022 French Open | Longest span between finals contested (16 years 11 months 30 days) | **Stands alone** | |

| Time span | Grand Slam tournaments | Records at each Grand Slam tournament | Players matched | Ref. |
|---|---|---|---|---|
| 2009–2022 | Australian Open | Longest gap between titles (13 years) | **Stands alone** | |
| 2022 | Australian Open | Won final from two sets down | Jannik Sinner | |
| 2012 | Australian Open | Longest final by duration (5 hours 53 minutes) | Novak Djokovic | |
| 2005–2022 | French Open | 14 titles overall | **Stands alone** | |
| 2005–2022 | French Open | 14 finals overall | **Stands alone** | |
| 2010–2014 | French Open | 5 consecutive titles | **Stands alone** | |
| 2010–2014 | French Open | 5 consecutive finals | **Stands alone** | |
| 2006–08, 2011–14, 2018–2020 | French Open | 10 title defences | **Stands alone** | |
| 2005–2022 | French Open | 15 semifinals overall | **Stands alone** | |
| 2017–2022 | French Open | 6 consecutive semifinals | Novak Djokovic | |
| 2005–2024 | French Open | 112 match wins overall | **Stands alone** | |
| 2005–2024 | French Open | 96.6% (112–4) match winning percentage | **Stands alone** | |
| 2010–2015 | French Open | 39 consecutive match wins | **Stands alone** | |
| 2008, 2010, 2017, 2020 | French Open | 4 titles won without losing a set | **Stands alone** | |
| 2005–2022 | French Open | 2+ titles in three separate decades | **Stands alone** | |
| 2005–2022 | French Open | 1+ title in three separate decades | **Stands alone** | |
| 2005 | French Open | Won title on the first attempt | Mats Wilander | |

| Time span | Other records | Players matched | Ref. |
|---|---|---|---|
| 2002–2024 | 84.4% (985–183) outdoor match winning percentage | **Stands alone** | |
| 2002–2024 | 985 outdoor match wins | **Stands alone** | |
| 2002–2024 | 90.5% (484–51) clay court match winning percentage | **Stands alone** | |
| 2005–2007 | 81 consecutive match wins on a single surface (clay) | **Stands alone** | |
| 2004–2014 | 52 consecutive semifinal wins on a single surface (clay) | **Stands alone** | |
| 2017–2018 | 50 consecutive sets won on a single surface (clay) | **Stands alone** | |
| 2005–2013 | 46 consecutive match wins at a single tournament (Monte Carlo) | **Stands alone** | |
| 2008 | 32 consecutive match wins across 3 different surfaces | **Stands alone** | |
| 2004–2022 | 90 outdoor titles | **Stands alone** | |
| 2005–2022 | 58 outdoor Big Titles | Novak Djokovic | |
| 2005–2021 | 35 outdoor Masters titles | **Stands alone** | |
| 2004–2022 | 63 clay-court titles | **Stands alone** | |
| 2005–2022 | 40 clay-court Big Titles | **Stands alone** | |
| 2004–2022 | 30 titles won without losing a set | **Stands alone** | |
| 2004–2022 | 30 outdoor titles won without losing a set | **Stands alone** | |
| 2004–2020 | 26 clay-court titles won without losing a set | **Stands alone** | |
| 2004–2022 | 19 consecutive seasons winning 1+ title | **Stands alone** | |
| 2005–2022 | 18 consecutive seasons winning 2+ titles | Novak Djokovic | |
| 2005–2022 | 11+ titles at a single tournament (French Open, Barcelona, Monte Carlo) | **Stands alone** | |
| 2005–2012 | 8 consecutive titles at a single tournament (Monte Carlo) | **Stands alone** | |
| 2004–2006 | 16 titles won as a teenager | Björn Borg | |
| 2004–2022 | 23 match wins against world No. 1 players (Note: The world No. 1 players who Nadal defeated were Roger Federer (13 times) and Novak Djokovic (10 times).) | **Stands alone** | |
| 2008–2020 | Ranked world No. 1 in three different decades | **Stands alone** | |
| 2005–2023 | Most consecutive weeks in the Top 10 (912) | **Stands alone** | |
| 2005–2022 | Most year-end Top 2 finishes (13) | **Stands alone** | |
| 2005–2022 | Most year-end Top 10 finishes (18) | Roger Federer; Novak Djokovic | |
| 2005–2022 | Most consecutive years in the Top 10 (18) | **Stands alone** | |

== Professional awards ==
- ITF World Champion (5): 2008, 2010, 2017, 2019, 2022
- ATP Player of the Year (5): 2008, 2010, 2013, 2017, 2019
- Laureus World Sports Award for Breakthrough of the Year: 2006
- Laureus World Sports Award for Sportsman of the Year (2): 2011, 2021
- Laureus World Sports Award for Comeback of the Year: 2014
- BBC Sports Personality World Sport Star of the Year: 2010
- Davis Cup Most Valuable Player: 2019
- ATP Newcomer of the Year: 2003
- ATP Most Improved Player of the Year: 2005
- Stefan Edberg Sportsmanship Award (5): 2010, 2018, 2019, 2020, 2021
- ATP Arthur Ashe Humanitarian of the Year: 2011
- ATP Comeback Player of the Year: 2013
- ATP Fan's Favourite Award: 2022

== See also ==
- List of career achievements by Rafael Nadal
- Forbes list of the world's top-10 highest-paid athletes
- All-time tennis records – Men's singles (since 1877)
- Open Era tennis records – Men's singles (since 1968)
- List of Grand Slam–related tennis records (since 1877)
- List of Grand Slam men's singles champions (since 1877)
- List of Olympic medalists in tennis (since 1896)
- List of ATP Tour top-level tournament singles champions (since 1990)
- Tennis Masters Series singles records and statistics (since 1990)
- ATP Tour records (since 1990)
- List of ATP number 1 ranked singles tennis players (since 1973)
- World number 1 ranked male tennis players (all-time)
- 2016 Summer Olympics national flag bearers
- Tennis in Spain

== Explanatory notes ==
Sporting positions
| Preceded by Roger Federer; Roger Federer; Novak Djokovic; Andy Murray; Roger Federer; Roger Federer; Roger Federer; Novak Djokovic | World No. 1 August 18, 2008 – July 5, 2009; June 7, 2010 – July 3, 2011; October 7, 2013 – July 6, 2014; August 21, 2017 – February 18, 2018; April 2, 2018 – May 13, 2018; May 21, 2018 – June 17, 2018; June 25, 2018 – November 4, 2018; November 6, 2019 – February 3, 2020 | Succeeded by Roger Federer; Novak Djokovic; Novak Djokovic; Roger Federer; Roger Federer; Roger Federer; Novak Djokovic; Novak Djokovic |
| Preceded by Roger Federer; Novak Djokovic | US Open Series Champion; 2008; 2013 | Succeeded by Sam Querrey; Milos Raonic |
Awards
| Preceded by Paul-Henri Mathieu | ATP Newcomer of the Year; 2003 | Succeeded by Florian Mayer |
| Preceded by Joachim Johansson | ATP Most Improved Player of the Year; 2005 | Succeeded by Novak Djokovic |
| Preceded by Fernando Alonso; Rafael Trujillo; Saúl Craviotto | Spanish Sportsman of the Year; 2006; 2008; 2017 | Succeeded by Rafael Trujillo; Xavi; Regino Hernández & Alejandro Valverde |
| Preceded by Roger Federer; Roger Federer; Novak Djokovic; Andy Murray; Novak Djokovic | ATP Player of the Year; 2008; 2010; 2013; 2017; 2019 | Succeeded by Roger Federer; Novak Djokovic; Novak Djokovic; Novak Djokovic; Incumbent |
| Preceded by Roger Federer; Roger Federer; Andy Murray; Novak Djokovic; Novak Djokovic | ITF World Champion; 2008; 2010; 2017; 2019; 2022 | Succeeded by Roger Federer; Novak Djokovic; Novak Djokovic — Incumbent |
| Preceded by Michael Schumacher | Princess of Asturias Award for Sports; 2008 | Succeeded by Yelena Isinbayeva |
| Preceded by Roger Federer; Roger Federer | ATP Stefan Edberg Sportsmanship Award; 2010; 2018 – 2021 | Succeeded by Roger Federer; Casper Ruud |
| Preceded by Usain Bolt | BBC Sports Personality World Sport Star of the Year; 2010 | Succeeded by Novak Djokovic |
| Preceded by Usain Bolt; Usain Bolt; Usain Bolt; Marcel Hirscher | L'Équipe Champion of Champions; 2010; 2013; 2017 (with Roger Federer); 2019 | Succeeded by Lionel Messi; Renaud Lavillenie; Marcel Hirscher; Lewis Hamilton |
| Preceded by Roger Federer; Roger Federer | European Sportsperson of the Year; 2008; 2010 | Succeeded by Roger Federer; Novak Djokovic |
| Preceded by Juan Carlos I | Marca Legend Award; 2008 | Succeeded by Raúl |
| Preceded by Usain Bolt; Lewis Hamilton & Lionel Messi | Laureus World Sportsman of the Year; 2011; 2021 | Succeeded by Novak Djokovic; Max Verstappen |
| Preceded by Roger Federer; Novak Djokovic; Novak Djokovic | Best Male Tennis Player ESPY Award; 2011; 2014; 2022 | Succeeded by Novak Djokovic; Novak Djokovic; Incumbent |
| Preceded by Rohan Bopanna & Aisam-ul-Haq Qureshi | Arthur Ashe Humanitarian of the Year; 2011 | Succeeded by Novak Djokovic |
| Preceded by Tommy Haas | ATP Comeback Player of the Year; 2013 | Succeeded by David Goffin |
| Preceded by Félix Sánchez | Laureus World Comeback of the Year; 2014 | Succeeded by Schalk Burger |
| Preceded by Liu Xiang | Laureus World Breakthrough of the Year; 2006 | Succeeded by Amélie Mauresmo |
Olympic Games
| Preceded by Pau Gasol | Flagbearer for Spain; Rio de Janeiro 2016 | Succeeded by Mireia Belmonte & Saúl Craviotto |
