= 2006 Seniors Torneo Godó =

- 2006 Torneo Godó

Final
- Champion: (Spain) Sergi Bruguera
- Runner-up: (Spain) Carlos Costa
- Score: 6–1, 6–4

Events
Singles	Doubles
← 2005 ·	Barcelona Open	· 2007 →

The 2006 Seniors Torneo Godó was the first edition of the Seniors Torneo Godó and it took place from April 20–23, 2006.

Tie breaks were used for the first two sets of each match, which was the best of three sets. If the score was tied at one set all, a "champions tie break" (the first player to win at least 10 points or by a margin of two points) would be used.

Sergi Bruguera won the inaugural edition by defeating Carlos Costa 6–1, 6–4 in the final.

== Draw ==
The list of players was confirmed in March 2006. Marcelo Ríos, winner of the first two tournaments at Doha and Hong Kong, was initially considered but later discarded.

- (Spain) Sergi Bruguera
- (Spain) Carlos Costa
- (Ecuador) Andrés Gómez
- (Argentina) Martín Jaite
- (Netherlands) Richard Krajicek
- (United States) John McEnroe
- (Spain) Javier Sánchez
- (Sweden) Mats Wilander

=== Group stage ===
==== Red group ====
	(Spain) Costa	(Argentina) Jaite	(United States) McEnroe	(Sweden) Wilander	RR W–L	Set W–L	Game W–L	Standings
(Spain) Carlos Costa		6–3, 7–6^{(7–3)}	7–6^{(12–10)}, 1–6, [10–7]	7–5, 6–2	3–0	6–1 (85.7%)	35–28 (55.5%)	1st place, gold medalist(s)
(Argentina) Martín Jaite	3–6, 6–7^{(3–7)}		2–6, 1–6	4–6, 3–6	0–3	0–6 (0.0%)	19–37 (33.9%)	4
(United States) John McEnroe	6–7^{(10–12)}, 6–1, [7–10]	6–2, 6–1		6–0, 6–1	2–1	5–2 (71.4%)	36–13 (73.5%)	2nd place, silver medalist(s)
(Sweden) Mats Wilander	5–7, 2–6	6–4, 6–3	0–6, 1–6		1–2	2–4 (33.3%)	20–32 (38.5%)	3

==== Blue group ====
	(Spain) Bruguera	(Ecuador) Gómez	(Netherlands) Krajicek	(Spain) Sánchez	RR W–L	Set W–L	Game W–L	Standings
(Spain) Sergi Bruguera		6–1, 7–6^{(8–6)}	6–3, 7–5	6–1, 6–4	3–0	6–0 (100%)	38–20 (65.5%)	1st place, gold medalist(s)
(Ecuador) Andrés Gómez	1–6, 6–7^{(6–8)}		2–6, 2–6	4–6, 6–4, [10–8]	1–2	2–5 (28.6%)	22–35 (38.6%)	3
(Netherlands) Richard Krajicek	3–6, 5–7	6–2, 6–2		6–1, 4–6, [10–3]	2–1	4–3 (57.1%)	31–24 (56.4%)	2nd place, silver medalist(s)
(Spain) Javier Sánchez	1–6, 4–6	6–4, 4–6, [8–10]	1–6, 6–4, [3–10]		0–3	2–6 (25.0%)	22–34 (39.3%)	4

=== Final four ===
==== Third-place playoff ====
Third-place playoff
(Netherlands) Richard Krajicek	6^{3}	6	[10]
(United States) John McEnroe	7^{7}	4	[7]

==== Final ====
Final
(Spain) Sergi Bruguera	6	6
(Spain) Carlos Costa	1	4
