= 2005 Torneo Godó – Doubles =

Tennis competition

Doubles
- 2005 Torneo Godó

Final
- Champions: (India) Leander Paes; (Serbia and Montenegro) Nenad Zimonjić
- Runners-up: (Spain) Feliciano López; (Spain) Rafael Nadal
- Score: 6–3, 6–3

Events
Singles	Doubles
← 2004 ·	Torneo Godó	· 2006 →

Mark Knowles and Daniel Nestor were the defending champions, but did not participate this year.

Leander Paes and Nenad Zimonjić won in the final 6–3, 6–3, against Feliciano López and Rafael Nadal.

== Seeds ==
All seeds receive a bye into the second round.

1. (Australia) Wayne Arthurs / (Australia) Paul Hanley (quarterfinals)
2. (India) Leander Paes / (Serbia and Montenegro) Nenad Zimonjić (champions)
3. (Argentina) Gastón Etlis / (Argentina) Martín Rodríguez (quarterfinals)
4. (Sweden) Simon Aspelin / (Australia) Todd Perry (semifinals)
5. (Czech Republic) Cyril Suk / (Czech Republic) Pavel Vízner (semifinals)
6. (Czech Republic) František Čermák / (Czech Republic) Leoš Friedl (quarterfinals)
7. (Czech Republic) Martin Damm / (Czech Republic) Radek Štěpánek (quarterfinals, withdrew)
8. (Israel) Jonathan Erlich / (Israel) Andy Ram (second round)

== Draw ==
=== Key ===
- Q = Qualifier
- WC = Wild card
- LL = Lucky loser
- Alt = Alternate
- ITF = ITF entry
- PR = Protected ranking
- SR = Special ranking
- SE = Special exempt
- JE = Junior exempt
- JR = Junior Accelerator Programme entrant
- CO = College Accelerator Programme entrant
- NG = Next Gen Accelerator Program entrant
- w/o = Walkover
- r = Retired
- d = Defaulted

=== Finals ===
Semifinals

Final

- (Spain) Feliciano López
- (Spain) Rafael Nadal
5
6
6

5
- (Czech Republic) Cyril Suk
- (Czech Republic) Pavel Vízner
7
2
4

- (Spain) Feliciano López
- (Spain) Rafael Nadal
3
3

2
- (India) Leander Paes
- (Serbia) Nenad Zimonjić
6
6

4
- (Sweden) Simon Aspelin
- (Australia) Todd Perry
3
4

2
- (India) Leander Paes
- (Serbia) Nenad Zimonjić
6
6

=== Top half ===
First round

Second round

Quarterfinals

Semifinals

1
- (Australia) W Arthurs
- (Australia) P Hanley
6
6

- (Czech Republic) D Škoch
- (United States) J Thomas
6
5
3

- (Slovakia) D Hrbatý
- (Czech Republic) J Levinský
1
4

- (Slovakia) D Hrbatý
- (Czech Republic) J Levinský
3
7
6

1
- (Australia) W Arthurs
- (Australia) P Hanley
4
4

- (Spain) F López
- (Spain) R Nadal
4
6
7

- (Spain) F López
- (Spain) R Nadal
6
6

- (Switzerland) Y Allegro
- (Germany) M Kohlmann
6
3
5

- (Spain) F López
- (Spain) R Nadal
6^{4}
7^{7}
6

8
- (Israel) J Erlich
- (Israel) A Ram
7^{7}
6^{5}
2

- (Spain) F López
- (Spain) R Nadal
5
6
6

5
- (Czech Republic) C Suk
- (Czech Republic) P Vízner
7
2
4

3
- (Argentina) G Etlis
- (Argentina) M Rodríguez
6
7^{7}

- (Morocco) Y El Aynaoui
- (Thailand) P Srichaphan
3
6^{0}

- (Germany) A Waske
- (Netherlands) R Wassen
3
6^{3}

- (Germany) A Waske
- (Netherlands) R Wassen
6
7^{7}

3
- (Argentina) G Etlis
- (Argentina) M Rodríguez
6
2
6^{6}

WC
- (Spain) N Almagro
- (Spain) F Verdasco
6
2
3

5
- (Czech Republic) C Suk
- (Czech Republic) P Vízner
3
6
7^{8}

WC
- (Spain) A Montañés
- (Spain) D Pérez
4
6
6

WC
- (Spain) A Montañés
- (Spain) D Pérez
4
2

5
- (Czech Republic) C Suk
- (Czech Republic) P Vízner
6
6

=== Bottom half ===
First round

Second round

Quarterfinals

Semifinals

7
- (Czech Republic) M Damm
- (Czech Republic) R Štěpánek
6
6

- (Argentina) L Arnold
- (Argentina) M Hood
6
6

- (Argentina) L Arnold
- (Argentina) M Hood
4
2

- (Russia) I Andreev
- (Russia) N Davydenko
3
2

7
- (Czech Republic) M Damm
- (Czech Republic) R Štěpánek

- (Czech Republic) P Pála
- (United States) J Palmer
4
6
7^{7}

4
- (Sweden) S Aspelin
- (Australia) T Perry
w/o

- (Argentina) G Cañas
- (Argentina) JI Chela
6
4
6^{5}

- (Czech Republic) P Pála
- (United States) J Palmer
2
6^{3}

4
- (Sweden) S Aspelin
- (Australia) T Perry
6
7^{7}

4
- (Sweden) S Aspelin
- (Australia) T Perry
3
4

2
- (India) L Paes
- (Serbia) N Zimonjić
6
6

6
- (Czech Republic) F Čermák
- (Czech Republic) L Friedl
6
3
7

- (Argentina) J Acasuso
- (Argentina) S Prieto
6
4
7^{7}

- (Argentina) J Acasuso
- (Argentina) S Prieto
0
6
5

- (Germany) K Braasch
- (Poland) M Matkowski
3
6
6^{2}

6
- (Czech Republic) F Čermák
- (Czech Republic) L Friedl
3
6
4

- (Argentina) A Calleri
- (Sweden) T Johansson
5
6
6

2
- (India) L Paes
- (Serbia) N Zimonjić
6
4
6

- (Belgium) X Malisse
- (Italy) P Starace
7
1
3

- (Argentina) A Calleri
- (Sweden) T Johansson

2
- (India) L Paes
- (Serbia) N Zimonjić
w/o
