= 2025 Barcelona Open Banc Sabadell =

- Date: 14–20 April
- Edition: 72nd
- Category: ATP Tour 500
- Draw: 32S / 16D
- Prize money: €2,889,200
- Surface: Clay
- Location: Barcelona, Spain
- Venue: Real Club de Tenis Barcelona

Champions

Singles
- (Denmark) Holger Rune

Doubles
- (Netherlands) Sander Arends / (United Kingdom) Luke Johnson
- Barcelona Open

The 2025 Barcelona Open Banc Sabadell (also known as the Trofeu Compte de Godó) was a men's tennis tournament played on outdoor clay courts at the Real Club de Tenis Barcelona in Barcelona, Spain, from 14 to 20 April 2025. It was the 72nd edition of the event and part of the ATP Tour 500 series of the 2025 ATP Tour. The singles main draw was reduced in size from 48 to 32 players this year.

== Champions ==
=== Singles ===
- (Denmark) Holger Rune def. (Spain) Carlos Alcaraz, 7–6^{(8–6)}, 6–2

=== Doubles ===
- (Netherlands) Sander Arends / (United Kingdom) Luke Johnson def. (United Kingdom) Joe Salisbury / (United Kingdom) Neal Skupski, 6–3, 6–7^{(1–7)}, [10–6]

== Singles main-draw entrants ==
=== Seeds ===
Country	Player	Rank^{1}	Seed
ESP	Carlos Alcaraz	3	1
NOR	Casper Ruud	7	2
GRE	Stefanos Tsitsipas	8	3
	Andrey Rublev	9	4
AUS	Alex de Minaur	10	5
DEN	Holger Rune	12	6
FRA	Arthur Fils	15	7
~~ITA~~	~~Lorenzo Musetti~~	~~16~~	~~8~~
USA	Frances Tiafoe	17	9

- ^{1} Rankings as of 7 April 2025.

=== Other entrants ===
The following players received wildcards into the main draw:

- (Spain) Pablo Carreño Busta
- (Spain) Albert Ramos Viñolas
- (Switzerland) Stan Wawrinka

The following player received entry using a protected ranking:

- (United States) Reilly Opelka

The following players received entry from the qualifying draw:

- (Netherlands) Jesper de Jong
- (Serbia) Laslo Djere
- (Colombia) Daniel Elahi Galán
- (Serbia) Hamad Medjedovic
- (United Kingdom) Cameron Norrie
- (United States) Ethan Quinn

The following players received entry as lucky losers:

- (Bosnia and Herzegovina) Damir Džumhur
- (United Kingdom) Jacob Fearnley
- (France) Arthur Rinderknech

=== Withdrawals ===
- (Czech Republic) Tomáš Macháč → replaced by (Bosnia and Herzegovina) Damir Džumhur
- (Italy) Lorenzo Musetti → replaced by (France) Arthur Rinderknech
- (Italy) Lorenzo Sonego → replaced by (Argentina) Tomás Martín Etcheverry
- (Australia) Jordan Thompson → replaced by (United Kingdom) Jacob Fearnley

== Doubles main-draw entrants ==
=== Seeds ===
Country	Player	Country	Player	Rank^{1}	Seed
~~FIN~~	~~Harri Heliövaara~~	~~GBR~~	~~Henry Patten~~	~~7~~	~~1~~
CRO	Nikola Mektić	NZL	Michael Venus	27	2
GBR	Julian Cash	GBR	Lloyd Glasspool	31	3
ARG	Máximo González	ARG	Andrés Molteni	37	4
USA	Sebastian Korda	AUS	Jordan Thompson	51	5

- Rankings are as of 7 April 2025.

=== Other entrants ===
The following pairs received wildcards into the doubles main draw:

- ~~(Spain) Roberto Carballés Baena / (Italy) Fabio Fognini~~
- (Spain) Pedro Martínez / (Spain) Jaume Munar

The following pair received entry as alternates:

- (Romania) Alexandru Jecan / (Austria) David Pichler
- (Czech Republic) Petr Nouza / (Czech Republic) Patrik Rikl

The following pair received entry from the qualifying draw:

- (Spain) Íñigo Cervantes / (Spain) Oriol Roca Batalla

=== Withdrawals ===
- (El Salvador) Marcelo Arévalo / (Croatia) Mate Pavić → replaced by (Argentina) Sebastián Báez / (Mexico) Santiago González
- (Italy) Simone Bolelli / (Italy) Andrea Vavassori → replaced by (Netherlands) Sander Arends / (United Kingdom) Luke Johnson
- (Spain) Roberto Carballés Baena / (Italy) Fabio Fognini → replaced by (Romania) Alexandru Jecan / (Austria) David Pichler
- (Finland) Harri Heliövaara / (United Kingdom) Henry Patten → replaced by (Czech Republic) Petr Nouza / (Czech Republic) Patrik Rikl
- (Monaco) Hugo Nys / (France) Édouard Roger-Vasselin → replaced by (Monaco) Hugo Nys / (Australia) John Peers
