= 1953 Torneo Godó =

- Date: 3–7 June
- Edition: 1st
- Surface: Clay / outdoor
- Location: Barcelona, Spain
- Venue: Real Club de Tenis Barcelona

Champions

Singles
- (United States) Vic Seixas

Doubles
- (United States) Vic Seixas / (Argentina) Enrique Morea
Torneo Godó	· 1954 →

The 1953 Torneo Godó was the inaugural edition of the Torneo Godó tennis event and it took place at the Real Club de Tenis Barcelona in Barcelona, Spain from 3 June until 7 June 1953. Vic Seixas won the singles title.

== Seeds ==
1. (United States) Vic Seixas (champion)
2. (Sweden) Lennart Bergelin (semifinalist)
3. (Argentina) Enrique Morea (runner-up)
4. (Spain) Emilio Martínez (second round)
5. (Switzerland) René Buser (semifinalist)
6. (Argentina) Eduardo Soriano (quarterfinalist)
7. (Spain) Luis Barril (quarterfinalist)
8. (Spain) José María Draper (quarterfinalist)

== Draw ==
=== Finals ===
Quarterfinals
2	(Sweden) Lennart Bergelin	2	3	1
3	(Argentina) Enrique Morea	6	6	6
5	(Switzerland) René Buser	1	3	4
1	(United States) Vic Seixas	6	6	6

Semifinals
3	(Argentina) Enrique Morea	3	4	20
1	(United States) Vic Seixas	6	6	22

=== Earlier rounds ===
==== Top half ====
Second round
1	(Sweden) Bergelin
bye
bye
(Spain) Klamburg
7	(Spain) Barril
bye
(Spain) Durall	3	0
(Spain) Lerín	6	6

Quarterfinals
2	(Sweden) Bergelin	6	6
(Spain) Klamburg	0	1
7	(Spain) Barril	w/o
(Spain) Lerín

Semifinals
2	(Sweden) Bergelin	6	6
7	(Spain) Barril	2	2
Semifinals
2	(Argentina) Morea	6	6	1
3	(Argentina) Soriano	0	3

==== Bottom half ====
Second round
(Spain) Aguiló	2	3
(Spain) Margets	6	6
(Spain) Marqués	6	2	2
5	(Switzerland) Buser	2	6	6
(Spain) Dot	1	7	6
(Spain) Carbó	6	5	4
(Spain) Pradell	3	0
4	(Spain) Martínez	6	6

Quarterfinals
(Spain) Margets	2	2
5	(Switzerland) Buser	6	6
(Spain) Dot	6	6
4	(Spain) Martínez	1	4

Semifinals
5	(Switzerland) Buser	6	6
(Spain) Dot	3	1
Semifinals
5	(Spain) Draper	1	3	4
1	(United States) Seixas	6	6
