= 1959 Torneo Godó =

- Date: 1–7 June
- Edition: 7th
- Surface: Clay / outdoor
- Location: Barcelona, Spain
- Venue: Real Club de Tenis Barcelona

Champions

Singles
- (Australia) Neale Fraser

Doubles
- (Australia) Roy Emerson / (Australia) Neale Fraser
← 1958 ·	Torneo Godó	· 1960 →

The 1959 Torneo Godó was the seventh edition of the Torneo Godó annual tennis tournament played on clay courts in Barcelona, Spain and it took place from 1–7 June 1959. Neale Fraser won the singles title.

== Seeds ==
1. (Australia) Neale Fraser (champion)
2. (Chile) Luis Ayala (semifinals)
3. (Australia) Roy Emerson (finalist)
4. (Australia) Ken Fletcher (second round)
5. (Spain) Manuel Santana (semifinals)
6. (South Africa) Ian Vermaak (quarterfinals)
7. (Australia) Rod Laver (quarterfinals)
8. (South Africa) Abe Segal (quarterfinals)

== Champions ==
=== Men's singles ===
(Australia) Neale Fraser defeated (Australia) Roy Emerson 6–2, 6–4, 3–6, 6–3

=== Men's doubles ===
(Australia) Roy Emerson / (Australia) Neale Fraser defeated (Chile) Luis Ayala / (Australia) Rod Laver 6–2, 4–6, 6–3, 13–11

== Draw ==
=== Finals ===
Semifinals
2	(Chile) Luis Ayala	7	2	2	3
3	(Australia) Roy Emerson	5	6	6	6
5	(Spain) Manuel Santana	6	4	12	1
1	(Australia) Neale Fraser	8	6	10	6

Final
3	(Australia) Roy Emerson	2	4	6	3
1	(Australia) Neale Fraser	6	6	3	6
