= 1957 Torneo Godó =

- Date: 3–19 May
- Edition: 5th
- Surface: Clay / outdoor
- Location: Barcelona, Spain
- Venue: Real Club de Tenis Barcelona

Champions

Singles
- (United States) Herbert Flam
← 1956 ·	Torneo Godó	· 1958 →

The 1957 Torneo Godó was the fifth edition of the Torneo Godó annual tennis tournament played on clay courts in Barcelona, Spain and it took place from May 3–19, 1957.

== Seeds ==
1. (United States) Herbert Flam (champion)
2. (Australia) Mervyn Rose (finalist)
3. (Sweden) Sven Davidson (second round)
4. (Australia) Bob Howe (semifinalist)
5. (Spain) Andrés Gimeno (quarterfinalist)
6. (United States) Gil Shea (third round)
7. (United States) Sidney Schwartz (quarterfinalist)
8. (Australia) Warren Woodcock (third round)

== Draw ==
=== Finals ===
Semifinals
2	(Australia) Mervyn Rose	7	5	10	6
(Australia) Neil Gibson	5	7	8	0
4	(Australia) Bob Howe	5	7	1	8
1	(United States) Herbert Flam	7	5	6	10

Final
2	(Australia) Mervyn Rose	4	6	3	4
1	(United States) Herbert Flam	6	4	6	6
