= 2025 Barcelona Open Banc Sabadell – Doubles =

Doubles
- 2025 Barcelona Open Banc Sabadell

Final
- Champions: (Netherlands) Sander Arends (United Kingdom) Luke Johnson
- Runners-up: (United Kingdom) Joe Salisbury (United Kingdom) Neal Skupski
- Score: 6–3, 6–7^{(1–7)}, [10–6]

Events
Singles	Doubles
← 2024 ·	Barcelona Open Banc Sabadell	· 2026 →

Sander Arends and Luke Johnson defeated Joe Salisbury and Neal Skupski in the final, 6–3, 6–7^{(1–7)}, [10–6] to win the doubles title at the 2025 Barcelona Open. It was the first ATP 500 title for both players, as well as the fourth ATP Tour title for Arends and third for Johnson.

Máximo González and Andrés Molteni were the two-time defending champions, but lost in the first round to Arends and Johnson.

== Seeds ==
1. (Finland) Harri Heliövaara / (United Kingdom) Henry Patten (withdrew)
2. (Croatia) Nikola Mektić / (New Zealand) Michael Venus (quarterfinals)
3. (United Kingdom) Julian Cash / (United Kingdom) Lloyd Glasspool (first round)
4. (Argentina) Máximo González / (Argentina) Andrés Molteni (first round)
5. (United States) Sebastian Korda / (Australia) Jordan Thompson (first round, retired)

== Draw ==
=== Key ===
- Q = Qualifier
- WC = Wild card
- LL = Lucky loser
- Alt = Alternate
- SE = Special exempt
- PR = Protected ranking
- ITF = ITF entry
- JE = Junior exempt
- w/o = Walkover
- r = Retired
- d = Defaulted
- SR = Special ranking

=== Draw ===
First round
5	(United States) S Korda (Australia) J Thompson	6	5^{r}
Q	(Spain) Í Cervantes (Spain) O Roca Batalla	3	3
Alt	(Czech Republic) P Nouza (Czech Republic) P Rikl	6	5	[3]
WC	(Spain) P Martínez (Spain) J Munar	1	7	[10]
4	(Argentina) M González (Argentina) A Molteni	3	3
(Netherlands) S Arends (United Kingdom) L Johnson	6	6
(Uruguay) A Behar (Belgium) J Vliegen	6	6
(Argentina) S Báez (Mexico) S González	3	2
(France) G Mpetshi Perricard (France) A Olivetti	6^{4}	2
(Austria) A Erler (Germany) C Frantzen	7^{7}	6
(Monaco) H Nys (Australia) J Peers	7	6
3	(United Kingdom) J Cash (United Kingdom) L Glasspool	5	4
(Italy) M Arnaldi (Argentina) TM Etcheverry	4	7^{10}	[5]
(United Kingdom) J Salisbury (United Kingdom) N Skupski	6	6^{8}	[10]
Alt	(Romania) A Jecan (Austria) D Pichler	6	4	[7]
2	(Croatia) N Mektić (New Zealand) M Venus	3	6	[10]

Quarterfinals
Q	(Spain) Í Cervantes (Spain) O Roca Batalla	6^{4}	3
WC	(Spain) P Martínez (Spain) J Munar	7^{7}	6
(Netherlands) S Arends (United Kingdom) L Johnson	6	6
(Uruguay) A Behar (Belgium) J Vliegen	4	2
(Austria) A Erler (Germany) C Frantzen	6	6
(Monaco) H Nys (Australia) J Peers	3	4
(United Kingdom) J Salisbury (United Kingdom) N Skupski	6	6
2	(Croatia) N Mektić (New Zealand) M Venus	3	4

Semifinals
WC	(Spain) P Martínez (Spain) J Munar	3	1
(Netherlands) S Arends (United Kingdom) L Johnson	6	6
(Austria) A Erler (Germany) C Frantzen	7	2	[4]
(United Kingdom) J Salisbury (United Kingdom) N Skupski	5	6	[10]

Final
(Netherlands) S Arends (United Kingdom) L Johnson	6	6^{1}	[10]
(United Kingdom) J Salisbury (United Kingdom) N Skupski	3	7^{7}	[6]

== Qualifying ==
=== Seeds ===
1. (Czech Republic) Petr Nouza / (Czech Republic) Patrik Rikl (moved to main draw)
2. (United States) Robert Cash / (United States) JJ Tracy (withdrew)

=== Qualifiers ===
1. (Spain) Íñigo Cervantes / (Spain) Oriol Roca Batalla

=== Qualifying draw ===
Qualifying competition
WC	(Spain) Íñigo Cervantes (Spain) Oriol Roca Batalla	w/o
2/Alt	(United States) Robert Cash (United States) JJ Tracy
