= 1958 Torneo Godó =

- Date: 12–18 May
- Edition: 6th
- Surface: Clay / outdoor
- Location: Barcelona, Spain
- Venue: Real Club de Tenis Barcelona

Champions

Singles
- (Sweden) Sven Davidson
← 1957 ·	Torneo Godó	· 1959 →

The 1958 Torneo Godó was the sixth edition of the Torneo Godó annual tennis tournament played on clay courts in Barcelona, Spain and it took place from May 12–18, 1958.

== Seeds ==
1. (Sweden) Sven Davidson (champion)
2. (Australia) Mervyn Rose (finalist)
3. (United Arab Republic) Jaroslav Drobný (quarterfinalist)
4. (United States) Budge Patty (semifinalist)
5. (United States) Bob Perry (third round)
6. (Spain) Andrés Gimeno (semifinalist)
7. (Sweden) Ulf Schmidt (third round)
8. (Australia) Warren Woodcock (quarterfinalist)

== Draw ==
=== Finals ===
Semifinals
2	(Australia) Mervyn Rose	6	1	1	6	6
6	(Spain) Andrés Gimeno	2	6	6	4	3
4	(United States) Budge Patty	6	6	6	4	3
1	(Sweden) Sven Davidson	8	4	4	6	6

Final
2	(Australia) Mervyn Rose	6	2	5	1
1	(Sweden) Sven Davidson	4	6	7	6
