= 1955 Torneo Godó =

- Date: 10-15 May
- Edition: 3rd
- Surface: Clay / outdoor
- Location: Barcelona, Spain
- Venue: Real Club de Tenis Barcelona

Champions

Singles
- (United States) Art Larsen
← 1954 ·	Torneo Godó	· 1956 →

The 1955 Torneo Godó was the third edition of the Torneo Godó annual tennis tournament played on clay courts in Barcelona, Spain and it took place from May 10–15, 1955.

== Seeds ==
1. (United States) Budge Patty (runner-up)
2. (United States) Art Larsen (champion)
3. (Australia) Mervyn Rose (semifinalist)
4. (United States) Herbert Flam (quarterfinalist)
5. (Poland) Władysław Skonecki (third round)
6. (Canada) Robert Bedard (quarterfinalist)
7. (Sweden) Staffan Stockenberg (quarterfinalist)
8. (Australia) George Worthington (quarterfinalist)

== Draw ==
=== Finals ===
Semifinals
2	(United States) Art Larsen	3	6	12	2	8
3	(Australia) Mervyn Rose	6	4	10	6	6
(South Africa) Trevor Fancutt	4	4	5
1	(United States) Budge Patty	6	6	7

Final
2	(United States) Art Larsen	7	3	7	2	6
1	(United States) Budge Patty	5	6	5	6	4

=== Earlier rounds ===
==== First round ====
Only three first round matches were played, the rest of the players received a bye into the second round.

Those three-round matches were the following matches:

- (Spain) Draper def. (Spain) Carbó 6/2, 6/1.
- (France) Walter def. (Spain) Catá 6/3, 5/7, 6/1.
- (Spain) Bartrolí def. (Spain) Alaponst 6/3, 6/2.

==== Top half ====
Second round
2	(United States) Larsen	7	6
(Spain) Guix	5	3
(Spain) Couder	6	6
(Spain) Garriga-Nogués	2	0
7	(Sweden) Stockenberg	6	6
(Spain) Tintoré	2	4
(South Africa) Williams	6	6
(Spain) Gimeno	3	4
3	(Australia) Rose	6	6
(Spain) Casado	0	1
(Canada) Fontana	6	6
(Spain) Castellá	1	0
6	(Canada) Bedard	6	6
(Spain) Bruix	1	0
(Spain) Draper	2	9	6
(France) Walter	6	7	1

Third round
2	(United States) Larsen	6	6
(Spain) Couder	1	2
7	(Sweden) Stockenberg	6	6
(South Africa) Williams	3	1
3	(Australia) Rose	6	6
(Canada) Fontana	0	2
6	(Canada) Bedard	6	9
(Spain) Draper	4	7

Quarterfinals
2	(United States) Larsen	6	6
7	(Sweden) Stockenberg	4	4
3	(Australia) Rose	6	6
6	(Canada) Bedard	4	3

Semifinals
2	(United States) Larsen	3	6	12	2	8
3	(Australia) Rose	6	4	10	6	6

==== Bottom half ====
Second round
(Spain) Bartrolí
(South Africa) Fancutt	w/o
(Spain) Lerín	1	2
5	(Poland) Skonecki	6	6
(Spain) Ferrer	6	6
(Spain) Manset	4	2
(Spain) Moure	6	2
4	(United States) Flam	8	6
(France) Bergerat	5	5
(Spain) Martínez	7	7
(Chile) Tort	0	0
8	(Australia) Worthington	6	6
(Spain) Ragaña	9	1	5
(Spain) Barril	7	6	7
(Spain) Sanz	3	1
1	(United States) Patty	6	6

Third round
(South Africa) Fancutt	6	6
5	(Poland) Skonecki	4	3
(Spain) Ferrer	2	6
4	(United States) Flam	6	8
(Spain) Martínez	4	4
8	(Australia) Worthington	6	6
(Spain) Barril	0	5
1	(United States) Patty	6	7

Quarterfinals
(South Africa) Fancutt	2	6	6
4	(United States) Flam	6	4	4
8	(Australia) Worthington	2	4
1	(United States) Patty	6	6

Semifinals
(South Africa) Fancutt	4	4	5
1	(United States) Patty	6	6	7
