= 1954 Torneo Godó =

- Date: 11-16 May
- Edition: 2nd
- Surface: Clay / outdoor
- Location: Barcelona, Spain
- Venue: Real Club de Tenis Barcelona

Champions

Singles
- (United States) Tony Trabert
← 1953 ·	Torneo Godó	· 1955 →

The 1954 Torneo Godó was the second edition of the Torneo Godó annual tennis tournament played on clay courts in Barcelona, Spain. It took place from 11 May until 16 May 1954.

== Seeds ==
1. (United States) Tony Trabert (champion)
2. (United States) Vic Seixas (runner-up)
3. (Sweden) Torsten Johansson (quarterfinalist)
4. (United States) Irvin Dorfman (quarterfinalist)
5. (United States) Gilbert Shea (semifinalist)
6. (Australia) Jack Arkinstall (semifinalist)
7. (United States) Malcolm Fox (quarterfinalist)
8. (South Africa) Owen Williams (quarterfinalist)

== Draw ==
=== Final Four ===
Quarterfinals
2	(United States) Vic Seixas	6	6	6
6	(Australia) Jack Arkinstall	2	3	1
5	(United States) Gilbert Shea	0	3	2
1	(United States) Tony Trabert	6	6	6

Semifinals
2	(United States) Vic Seixas	0	1	3
1	(United States) Tony Trabert	6	6	6

=== Earlier rounds ===
==== Top half ====
First round
2	(United States) Seixas	6	6
(Spain) Basas	1	1
(Spain) Regaña	6	6
(Spain) C. de Setmenat	2	0
7	(United States) Fox	6	6
(Spain) Ayxelá	4	2
(Spain) Casas	6	6
(Spain) Casado	1	1
3	(Sweden) Johansson	6	6
(Spain) Castellá	4	4
(Spain) Gimeno	1	1
(South Africa) Segal	6	6
6	(Australia) Arkinstall	6	6
(Spain) Tintoré	1	0
(Spain) Fleischner	3	4
(Australia) Maggs	6	6

Second round
2	(United States) Seixas	6	6
(Spain) Regaña	3	0
7	(United States) Fox	6	7
(Spain) Casas	4	5
3	(Sweden) Johansson	6	6
(South Africa) Segal	4	4
6	(Australia) Arkinstall	6	6
(Australia) Maggs	1	2

Quarterfinals
2	(United States) Seixas	6	6
7	(United States) Fox	3	3
3	(Sweden) Johansson	7	2
6	(United States) Arkinstall	9	6

Semifinals
2	(United States) Seixas	6	6	6
6	(Australia) Arkinstall	2	3	1

==== Bottom half ====
First round
(Spain) Marqués	9	2	3
(Spain) Vilatobá	7	6	6
(Spain) Vendrell	1	2
5	(United States) Shea	6	6
(Spain) Soler Bardem	6	7
(Spain) Omedes	3	5
(Spain) Margets	0	0
4	(United States) Dorfman	6	6
(Spain) Guix	3	3
(Spain) Garriga-Nogués	6	6
(Spain) Arilla	2	1
8	(South Africa) Williams	6	6
(Spain) Alaponst	6	8
(Spain) Moure	8	10
(Spain) S. de Setmenat	1	1
1	(United States) Trabert	6	6

Second round
(Spain) Vilatobá	3	1
5	(United States) Shea	6	6
(Spain) Soler Bardem	0	2
4	(United States) Dorfman	6	6
(Spain) Garriga-Nogués	0	2
8	(South Africa) Williams	6	6
(Spain) Moure	0	2
1	(United States) Trabert	6	6

Quarterfinals
5	(United States) Shea	7	6
(United States) Dorfman	5	0
8	(South Africa) Williams	3	2
1	(United States) Trabert	6	6

Semifinals
5	(United States) Shea	0	3	2
1	(United States) Trabert	6	6	6
