= 1956 Torneo Godó =

- Date: 28 May–3 June
- Edition: 4th
- Surface: Clay / outdoor
- Location: Barcelona, Spain
- Venue: Real Club de Tenis Barcelona

Champions

Singles
- (United States) Herbert Flam
← 1955 ·	Torneo Godó	· 1957 →

The 1956 Torneo Godó was the fourth edition of the Torneo Godó annual tennis tournament played on outdoor clay courts in Barcelona, Spain and it took place from 28 May to 3 June 1956. Third-seeded Herbert Flam won the singles title.

== Seeds ==
1. (Australia) Lew Hoad (quarterfinalist)
2. (United States) Art Larsen (semifinalist)
3. (United States) Herbert Flam (champion)
4. (Australia) Don Candy (quarterfinalist)
5. (United States) Bob Perry (semifinalist)
6. (Australia) Ashley Cooper (quarterfinalist)
7. (South Africa) Abe Segal (quarterfinalist)
8. (South Africa) Trevor Fancutt (second round)

== Draw ==
=== Finals ===
Semifinals
2	(United States) Art Larsen	4	0	2
6	(United States) Herbert Flam	6	6	6
5	(United States) Bob Perry	6	5	3	7	4
(Australia) Bob Howe	1	7	6	5	6

Final
3	(United States) Herbert Flam	6	6	6
(Australia) Bob Howe	2	3	0

=== Earlier rounds ===
==== Top half ====
Second round
2	(United States) Larsen	6	10
(Spain) Martínez	4	8
(Spain) Arilla	w/o
(Cuba) Garrido
7	(South Africa) Segal	6	6
(Spain) Catá	2	0
(Spain) Santana
(United States) Dorfman	w/o

Quarterfinals
2	(United States) Larsen	6	9
(Spain) Arilla	2	7
7	(South Africa) Segal	6	6
(United States) Dorfman	2	0

Semifinals
2	(United States) Larsen	6	6
7	(South Africa) Segal	3	3
Semifinals
2	(United States) Flam	6	2
3	(Australia) Cooper	4	r

==== Bottom half ====
Second round
(Spain) Castellá	2	6	6
(Spain) Klamburg	6	2	1
(France) Sanglier	0	1
5	(United States) Perry	6	6
(Venezuela) Pimentel	w/o
(United States) Vincent
(Spain) Regaña	2	2
4	(Australia) Candy	6	6

Quarterfinals
(Spain) Castellá	1	1
5	(United States) Perry	6	6
(Venezuela) Pimentel	4	2
4	(United States) Candy	6	6

Semifinals
5	(United States) Perry	6	6
4	(Australia) Candy	3	2
Semifinals
5	(Australia) Howe	7	7	3	7	4
(Australia) Hoad	9	5	9	5	6
