= 2013 Barcelona Open Banco Sabadell – Singles =

Singles
- 2013 Barcelona Open Banco Sabadell

Final
- Champion: (Spain) Rafael Nadal
- Runner-up: (Spain) Nicolás Almagro
- Score: 6–4, 6–3

Details
- Draw: 48 (6 Q / 4 WC )
- Seeds: 16

Events
Singles	Doubles
← 2012 ·	Barcelona Open	· 2014 →

Two-time defending champion Rafael Nadal defeated Nicolás Almagro in the final, 6–4, 6–3 to win the singles tennis title at the 2013 Barcelona Open. It was his record-extending eighth Barcelona Open title.

== Seeds ==
All seeds receive a bye into the second round.

1. (Spain) David Ferrer (second round)
2. (Spain) Rafael Nadal (champion)
3. (Czech Republic) Tomáš Berdych (third round)
4. (Spain) Nicolás Almagro (final)
5. (Canada) Milos Raonic (semifinals)
6. (Japan) Kei Nishikori (third round)
7. (Argentina) Juan Mónaco (quarterfinals)
8. (Germany) Philipp Kohlschreiber (semifinals)
9. (Poland) Jerzy Janowicz (second round)
10. (France) Jérémy Chardy (third round)
11. (Slovakia) Martin Kližan (third round)
12. (Spain) Fernando Verdasco (second round)
13. (France) Benoît Paire (third round)
14. (Bulgaria) Grigor Dimitrov (second round)
15. (Spain) Marcel Granollers (third round)
16. (Brazil) Thomaz Bellucci (quarterfinals, withdrew because of an abdominal strain)

== Draw ==
=== Key ===
- Q = Qualifier
- WC = Wild card
- LL = Lucky loser
- Alt = Alternate
- SE = Special exempt
- PR = Protected ranking
- ITF = ITF entry
- JE = Junior exempt
- w/o = Walkover
- r = Retired
- d = Defaulted
- SR = Special ranking

=== Finals ===
Quarterfinals
16	(Brazil) Thomaz Bellucci
8	(Germany) Philipp Kohlschreiber	w/o
4	(Spain) Nicolás Almagro	6	7
7	(Argentina) Juan Mónaco	3	5
5	(Canada) Milos Raonic	6^{5}	6	7^{7}
(Spain) Tommy Robredo	7^{7}	3	6^{2}
(Spain) Albert Ramos	3	0
2	(Spain) Rafael Nadal	6	6

Semifinals
8	(Germany) Philipp Kohlschreiber	2	1
4	(Spain) Nicolás Almagro	6	6
5	(Canada) Milos Raonic	4	0
2	(Spain) Rafael Nadal	6	6

Final
4	(Spain) Nicolás Almagro	4	3
2	(Spain) Rafael Nadal	6	6

=== Top half ===
==== Section 1 ====
First round
Q	(Russia) D Tursunov	6	6
(Uzbekistan) D Istomin	3	4
(Netherlands) R Haase	1	6	6^{5}
WC	(Spain) P Carreño Busta	6	2	7^{7}
(Lithuania) R Berankis	4	3
WC	(Spain) A Montañés	6	6
(Netherlands) I Sijsling	1	3
(Russia) A Kuznetsov	6	6

Second round
1	(Spain) D Ferrer	5	6	1
Q	(Russia) D Tursunov	7	3	6
WC	(Spain) P Carreño Busta	7^{7}	3	5
16	(Brazil) T Bellucci	6^{5}	6	7
11	(Slovakia) M Kližan	6	6
WC	(Spain) A Montañés	3	4
(Russia) A Kuznetsov	3	7^{7}	6^{2}
8	(Germany) P Kohlschreiber	6	6^{5}	7^{7}

Third round
Q	(Russia) D Tursunov	6	1	3
16	(Brazil) T Bellucci	4	6	6
11	(Slovakia) M Kližan	6	6^{2}	6^{5}
8	(Germany) P Kohlschreiber	1	7^{7}	7^{7}

Quarterfinals
16	(Brazil) T Bellucci
8	(Germany) P Kohlschreiber	w/o

==== Section 2 ====
First round
(Slovenia) A Bedene	7^{8}	3	2
(Croatia) I Dodig	6^{6}	6	6
(Colombia) A Falla	3	0
(Slovenia) B Kavčič	6	6
(Italy) P Lorenzi	6	6
(France) G Rufin	4	2
(Australia) B Tomic	6	4	6
Q	(France) K de Schepper	4	6	2

Second round
4	(Spain) N Almagro	6	7
(Croatia) I Dodig	1	5
(Slovenia) B Kavčič	3	1
15	(Spain) M Granollers	6	6
10	(France) J Chardy	6	6
(Italy) P Lorenzi	2	4
(Australia) B Tomic	0	2
7	(Argentina) J Mónaco	6	6

Third round
4	(Spain) N Almagro	6	6
15	(Spain) M Granollers	3	4
10	(France) J Chardy	0	6^{11}
7	(Argentina) J Mónaco	6	7^{13}

Quarterfinals
4	(Spain) N Almagro	6	7
7	(Argentina) J Mónaco	3	5

=== Bottom half ===
==== Section 3 ====
First round
(France) É Roger-Vasselin	6	6^{1}	6
Q	(Czech Republic) J Hájek	2	7^{7}	2
(Czech Republic) R Štěpánek	6^{4}	2
Q	(Latvia) E Gulbis	7^{7}	6
(Spain) T Robredo	2	6	6
Q	(Spain) M López	6	2	2
(Russia) N Davydenko	6	6
WC	(Spain) R Carballés Baena	1	4

Second round
5	(Canada) M Raonic	6	6
(France) É Roger-Vasselin	4	2
Q	(Latvia) E Gulbis	6	6
12	(Spain) F Verdasco	3	4
14	(Bulgaria) G Dimitrov	5	1
(Spain) T Robredo	7	6
(Russia) N Davydenko	6	5	4
3	(Czech Republic) T Berdych	3	7	6

Third round
5	(Canada) M Raonic	6	7^{8}
Q	(Latvia) E Gulbis	2	6^{6}
(Spain) T Robredo	3	7^{7}	6
3	(Czech Republic) T Berdych	6	6^{5}	3

Quarterfinals
5	(Canada) M Raonic	6^{5}	6	7^{7}
(Spain) T Robredo	7^{7}	3	6^{2}

==== Section 4 ====
First round
Q	(Spain) G Olaso	6	1	6
WC	(Spain) G Granollers	4	6	4
(Spain) A Ramos	6	7^{7}
LL	(Germany) J-L Struff	4	6^{2}
(Spain) P Andújar	6^{6}	7^{7}	6
(Slovenia) G Žemlja	7^{8}	6^{3}	2
(Argentina) C Berlocq	7	6
(Spain) D Gimeno Traver	5	4

Second round
6	(Japan) K Nishikori	6	6
Q	(Spain) G Olaso	1	3
(Spain) A Ramos	4	6	6
9	(Poland) J Janowicz	6	2	3
13	(France) B Paire	6	5	6
(Spain) P Andújar	4	7	3
(Argentina) C Berlocq	4	2
2	(Spain) R Nadal	6	6

Third round
6	(Japan) K Nishikori	4	6^{4}
(Spain) A Ramos	6	7^{7}
13	(France) B Paire	6^{2}	2
2	(Spain) R Nadal	7^{7}	6

Quarterfinals
(Spain) A Ramos	3	0
2	(Spain) R Nadal	6	6

== Qualifying ==
=== Seeds ===
1. (Latvia) Ernests Gulbis (qualified)
2. (Russia) Dmitry Tursunov (qualified)
3. (Czech Republic) Jan Hájek (qualified)
4. (France) Kenny de Schepper (qualified)
5. (Austria) Andreas Haider-Maurer (first round)
6. (Germany) Jan-Lennard Struff (qualifying competition, lucky loser)
7. (Kazakhstan) Mikhail Kukushkin (qualifying competition)
8. (France) Josselin Ouanna (first round)
9. (France) Stéphane Robert (qualifying competition)
10. (Spain) Arnau Brugués Davi (first round)
11. (Turkey) Marsel İlhan (qualifying competition)
12. (Australia) Matthew Barton (first round)

=== Qualifiers ===
1. (Latvia) Ernests Gulbis
2. (Russia) Dmitry Tursunov
3. (Czech Republic) Jan Hájek
4. (France) Kenny de Schepper
5. (Spain) Marc López
6. (Spain) Guillermo Olaso

=== Lucky losers ===
1. (Germany) Jan-Lennard Struff

=== Draw ===
==== First qualifier ====
First round
1	(Latvia) Ernests Gulbis	6	6
WC	(Spain) Pol Toledo Bagué	2	1
(Netherlands) Matwé Middelkoop	6	6
12	(Australia) Matthew Barton	4	2

Qualifying competition
1	(Latvia) Ernests Gulbis	6	6
(Netherlands) Matwé Middelkoop	4	1

==== Second qualifier ====
First round
2	(Russia) Dmitry Tursunov	6	6
(Canada) Steven Diez	1	4
(Spain) Javier Martí	7	6
10	(Spain) Arnau Brugués Davi	5	0

Qualifying competition
2	(Russia) Dmitry Tursunov	6	4	7
(Spain) Javier Martí	3	6	5

==== Third qualifier ====
First round
3	(Czech Republic) Jan Hájek	6	7
WC	(Spain) Pere Riba	4	5
WC	(Spain) Oriol Roca Batalla	1	6	1
7	(Kazakhstan) Mikhail Kukushkin	6	4	6

Qualifying competition
3	(Czech Republic) Jan Hájek	6	6^{4}	6
7	(Kazakhstan) Mikhail Kukushkin	3	7^{7}	2

==== Fourth qualifier ====
First round
4	(France) Kenny de Schepper	6	6
(Spain) Sergio Gutiérrez Ferrol	3	2
(Spain) Juan Lizariturry	1	6^{2}
11	(Turkey) Marsel İlhan	6	7^{7}

Qualifying competition
4	(France) Kenny de Schepper	7^{7}	6
11	(Turkey) Marsel İlhan	6^{3}	1

==== Fifth qualifier ====
First round
5	(Austria) Andreas Haider-Maurer	2	6^{2}
WC	(Spain) Marc López	6	7^{7}
(Italy) Simone Vagnozzi	4	6	1
9	(France) Stéphane Robert	6	1	6

Qualifying competition
WC	(Spain) Marc López	6	6
9	(France) Stéphane Robert	1	0

==== Sixth qualifier ====
First round
6	(Germany) Jan-Lennard Struff	4	6	6
(France) Fabrice Martin	6	4	1
(Spain) Guillermo Olaso	7^{9}	6
8	(France) Josselin Ouanna	6^{7}	4

Qualifying competition
6	(Germany) Jan-Lennard Struff	3	6	4
(Spain) Guillermo Olaso	6	2	6
