= 2012 Barcelona Open Banco Sabadell – Singles =

Singles
- 2012 Barcelona Open Banco Sabadell

Final
- Champion: (Spain) Rafael Nadal
- Runner-up: (Spain) David Ferrer
- Score: 7–6^{(7–1)}, 7–5

Details
- Draw: 56 (7 Q / 4 WC )
- Seeds: 18

Events
Singles	Doubles
← 2011 ·	Barcelona Open	· 2013 →

Defending champion Rafael Nadal defeated David Ferrer in the final, 7–6^{(7–1)}, 7–5. It was his record-extending seventh title at the Barcelona Open, and the victory came after the longest set won by Nadal in his career (93 minutes to win the first set).

== Seeds ==
Top 9 seeds received a bye into the second round.

1. (Spain) Rafael Nadal (champion)
2. (United Kingdom) Andy Murray (quarterfinals)
3. (Spain) David Ferrer (final)
4. (Czech Republic) Tomáš Berdych (withdrew because of a right shoulder injury)
5. (Serbia) Janko Tipsarević (quarterfinals)
6. (Spain) Nicolás Almagro (third round)
7. (Spain) Feliciano López (quarterfinals)
8. (Japan) Kei Nishikori (quarterfinals, retired because of an abdominal strain)
9. (Spain) Fernando Verdasco (semifinals)
10. (Czech Republic) Radek Štěpánek (withdrew because of a stomach virus)
11. (Canada) Milos Raonic (semifinals)
12. (Spain) Marcel Granollers (first round)
13. (South Africa) Kevin Anderson (third round)
14. (Argentina) Juan Ignacio Chela (withdrew because of an Achilles tendon injury)
15. (Australia) Bernard Tomic (second round)
16. (Spain) Pablo Andújar (second round)
17. (Spain) Albert Ramos (third round)
18. (Uzbekistan) Denis Istomin (first round)

== Draw ==
=== Key ===
- Q = Qualifier
- WC = Wild card
- LL = Lucky loser
- Alt = Alternate
- SE = Special exempt
- PR = Protected ranking
- ITF = ITF entry
- JE = Junior exempt
- w/o = Walkover
- r = Retired
- d = Defaulted
- SR = Special ranking

=== Finals ===
Quarterfinals
1	(Spain) Rafael Nadal	6	6
5	(Serbia) Janko Tipsarević	2	2
9	(Spain) Fernando Verdasco	4
8	(Japan) Kei Nishikori	2^{r}
7	(Spain) Feliciano López	7^{7}	6^{7}	3
3	(Spain) David Ferrer	6^{4}	7^{9}	6
11	(Canada) Milos Raonic	6	7^{7}
2	(United Kingdom) Andy Murray	4	6^{3}

Semifinals
1	(Spain) Rafael Nadal	6	6
9	(Spain) Fernando Verdasco	0	4
3	(Spain) David Ferrer	7^{7}	7^{7}
11	(Canada) Milos Raonic	6^{2}	6^{5}

Final
1	(Spain) Rafael Nadal	7^{7}	7
3	(Spain) David Ferrer	6^{1}	5

=== Top half ===
==== Section 1 ====
First round
(Spain) G García López	6	6
(Belgium) O Rochus	3	3
LL	(Spain) A Brugués Davi	4	6^{3}
Q	(Colombia) R Farah	6	7^{7}
Q	(Belgium) D Goffin	6^{2}	4
16	(Spain) P Andújar	7^{7}	6
12	(Spain) M Granollers	2	2
(Portugal) F Gil	6	6
Q	(Portugal) J Sousa	7^{7}	6
(Russia) I Kunitsyn	6^{5}	3
(Romania) V Hănescu	6	7^{7}
(Portugal) R Machado	3	6^{5}

Second round
1	(Spain) R Nadal	6	6
(Spain) G García López	1	2
Q	(Colombia) R Farah	7^{10}	4	7
16	(Spain) P Andújar	6^{8}	6	5
(Portugal) F Gil	4	6	6
Q	(Portugal) J Sousa	6	4	3
(Romania) V Hănescu	5	4
5	(Serbia) J Tipsarević	7	6

Third round
1	(Spain) R Nadal	6	6
Q	(Colombia) R Farah	2	3
(Portugal) F Gil	2	2
5	(Serbia) J Tipsarević	6	6

Quarterfinals
1	(Spain) R Nadal	6	6
5	(Serbia) J Tipsarević	2	2

==== Section 2 ====
First round
Q	(Kazakhstan) A Golubev	6	6^{2}	6^{5}
(Belgium) S Darcis	4	7^{7}	7^{7}
Q	(Slovenia) A Bedene	3	5
Q	(Argentina) F Delbonis	6	7
(Tunisia) M Jaziri	2	3
13	(South Africa) K Anderson	6	6
17	(Spain) A Ramos	4
(Germany) A Beck	1^{r}
(France) B Paire	6	7
(Czech Republic) L Rosol	3	5
(Spain) D Gimeno Traver	2	3
(Kazakhstan) M Kukushkin	6	6

Second round
9	(Spain) F Verdasco	6	6
(Belgium) S Darcis	3	1
Q	(Argentina) F Delbonis	6^{5}	6^{5}
13	(South Africa) K Anderson	7^{7}	7^{7}
17	(Spain) A Ramos	6	7
(France) B Paire	3	5
(Kazakhstan) M Kukushkin	3	6	0
8	(Japan) K Nishikori	6	4	6

Third round
9	(Spain) F Verdasco	6	6
13	(South Africa) K Anderson	4	4
17	(Spain) A Ramos	6^{2}	3
8	(Japan) K Nishikori	7^{7}	6

Quarterfinals
9	(Spain) F Verdasco	4
8	(Japan) K Nishikori	2^{r}

=== Bottom half ===
==== Section 3 ====
First round
(Italy) P Lorenzi	0	3
(Italy) F Cipolla	6	6
(Finland) J Nieminen	6	6
WC	(Spain) J Martí	4	1
WC	(Spain) R Ramírez Hidalgo	6	4	0
LL	(Argentina) E Schwank	2	6	6
15	(Australia) B Tomic	6	6
(Latvia) E Gulbis	3	4
(Spain) A Montañés	7	6
WC	(Spain) G Granollers	5	2
WC	(Serbia) F Krajinović	6	6
WC	(Spain) I Cervantes Huegun	2	4

Second round
7	(Spain) F López	6	6
(Italy) F Cipolla	4	3
(Finland) J Nieminen	6	6^{4}	6
LL	(Argentina) E Schwank	3	7^{7}	4
15	(Australia) B Tomic	0	7	5
(Spain) A Montañés	6	5	7
WC	(Serbia) F Krajinović	0	3
3	(Spain) D Ferrer	6	6

Third round
7	(Spain) F López	6	6
(Finland) J Nieminen	3	1
(Spain) A Montañés	0	2
3	(Spain) D Ferrer	6	6

Quarterfinals
7	(Spain) F López	7^{7}	6^{7}	3
3	(Spain) D Ferrer	6^{4}	7^{9}	6

==== Section 4 ====
First round
LL	(France) S Robert	2	3
(France) É Roger-Vasselin	6	6
(Russia) I Andreev	6	6
(Argentina) D Junqueira	2	3
(Colombia) A Falla	4	6^{3}
11	(Canada) M Raonic	6	7^{7}
18	(Uzbekistan) D Istomin	6^{3}	4
(Colombia) S Giraldo	7^{7}	6
Q	(Ukraine) S Bubka	1	2^{r}
(Netherlands) R Haase	6	3
LL	(Russia) E Donskoy	2	3
(Ukraine) S Stakhovsky	6	6

Second round
6	(Spain) N Almagro	7	7^{7}
(France) É Roger-Vasselin	5	6^{3}
(Russia) I Andreev	4	1
11	(Canada) M Raonic	6	6
(Colombia) S Giraldo	6	6
(Netherlands) R Haase	4	3
(Ukraine) S Stakhovsky	3	2
2	(United Kingdom) A Murray	6	6

Third round
6	(Spain) N Almagro	3	3
11	(Canada) M Raonic	6	6
(Colombia) S Giraldo	1	2
2	(United Kingdom) A Murray	6	6

Quarterfinals
11	(Canada) M Raonic	6	7^{7}
2	(United Kingdom) A Murray	4	6^{3}

== Qualifying ==
=== Seeds ===
1. (Belgium) David Goffin (qualified)
2. (France) Stéphane Robert (qualifying competition, lucky loser)
3. (Spain) Daniel Muñoz de la Nava (first round)
4. (Russia) Evgeny Donskoy (qualifying competition, lucky loser)
5. (Argentina) Federico Delbonis (qualified)
6. (Portugal) João Sousa (qualified)
7. (Kazakhstan) Andrey Golubev (qualified)
8. (Slovenia) Aljaž Bedene (qualified)
9. (Ukraine) Sergei Bubka (qualified)
10. (Italy) Simone Vagnozzi (first round)
11. (Spain) Arnau Brugués Davi (qualifying competition, lucky loser)
12. (Czech Republic) Jan Mertl (first round)
13. (Argentina) Eduardo Schwank (qualifying competition, lucky loser)
14. (Germany) Peter Torebko (first round)

=== Qualifiers ===
1. (Belgium) David Goffin
2. (Colombia) Robert Farah
3. (Ukraine) Sergei Bubka
4. (Slovenia) Aljaž Bedene
5. (Argentina) Federico Delbonis
6. (Portugal) João Sousa
7. (Kazakhstan) Andrey Golubev

=== Lucky losers ===
1. (France) Stéphane Robert
2. (Russia) Evgeny Donskoy
3. (Spain) Arnau Brugués Davi
4. (Argentina) Eduardo Schwank

=== Draw ===
==== First qualifier ====
First round
1	(Belgium) David Goffin	4	6	6
(Spain) Guillermo Olaso	6	4	2
WC	(Spain) Oriol Roca Batalla	3	2
11	(Spain) Arnau Brugués Davi	6	6

Qualifying competition
1	(Belgium) David Goffin	6^{5}	6	6
11	(Spain) Arnau Brugués Davi	7^{7}	4	0

==== Second qualifier ====
First round
2	(France) Stéphane Robert	6	6
(Slovakia) Pavol Červenák	2	4
(Colombia) Robert Farah	7	6
14	(Germany) Peter Torebko	5	2

Qualifying competition
2	(France) Stéphane Robert	6^{3}	3
(Colombia) Robert Farah	7^{7}	6

==== Third qualifier ====
First round
3	(Spain) Daniel Muñoz de la Nava	6	6^{6}	6^{1}
(Poland) Jerzy Janowicz	3	7^{8}	7^{7}
WC	(Spain) Óscar Sabate-Bretos	3	4
9	(Ukraine) Sergei Bubka	6	6

Qualifying competition
(Poland) Jerzy Janowicz	6	3	4
9	(Ukraine) Sergei Bubka	2	6	6

==== Fourth qualifier ====
First round
4	(Russia) Evgeny Donskoy	7	6
(Spain) Iván Navarro	5	4
WC	(Spain) Jordi Samper-Montaña	4	1
8	(Slovenia) Aljaž Bedene	6	6

Qualifying competition
4	(Russia) Evgeny Donskoy	5	6^{3}
8	(Slovenia) Aljaž Bedene	7	7^{7}

==== Fifth qualifier ====
First round
5	(Argentina) Federico Delbonis	6	6
(France) Nicolas Devilder	2	2
WC	(Spain) Roberto Carballés Baena	6	5	0
13	(Argentina) Eduardo Schwank	4	7	6

Qualifying competition
5	(Argentina) Federico Delbonis	7	6
13	(Argentina) Eduardo Schwank	5	3

==== Sixth qualifier ====
First round
6	(Portugal) João Sousa	6	6
Alt	(Canada) Steven Diez	4	0
(Kazakhstan) Evgeny Korolev	6	6^{5}	7^{7}
10	(Italy) Simone Vagnozzi	3	7^{7}	6^{5}

Qualifying competition
6	(Portugal) João Sousa	6	5	6
(Kazakhstan) Evgeny Korolev	3	7	4

==== Seventh qualifier ====
First round
7	(Kazakhstan) Andrey Golubev	6	6
(Colombia) Juan Sebastián Cabal	3	3
(Spain) Adrián Menéndez	7	6
12	(Czech Republic) Jan Mertl	5	4

Qualifying competition
7	(Kazakhstan) Andrey Golubev	6	6
(Spain) Adrián Menéndez	3	1
