= 2010 Seniors Torneo Godó =

- 2010 Barcelona Open Banco Sabadell

Final
- Champion: (Croatia) Goran Ivanišević
- Runner-up: (Sweden) Thomas Enqvist
- Score: 6–4, 6–4

Details
- Draw: 6

Events
Singles	Doubles
- Barcelona Open

The 2010 Seniors Torneo Godó was the fifth edition of the Seniors Torneo Godó and it took place from April 16–18, 2010.

Tie-breaks were used for the first two sets of each match, which was the best of three sets. If the score was tied at one set all, a "champions tie break" (the first player to win at least 10 points or by a margin of two points) would be used.

Félix Mantilla was the defending champion, but did not compete this year.

Goran Ivanišević won the title by defeating Thomas Enqvist 6–4, 6–4 in the final. Joan Balcells took the third place.

== Draw ==
For a player to be eligible for play on this tour, he must be in the year of his 35th birthday or have been retired from the ATP World Tour for two years or more. Each player must have been either a world No. 1, a Grand Slam finalist, or a singles player in a winning Davis Cup team. Each event can also invite two players of its choice to take wild cards.

The main draw was announced on 24 March. The order of play was revealed in early April.

Player	Age*	Ranking	Grand Slams	Davis Cup	Entry criteria
(Spain) Joan Balcells	34 years, 300 days (retired in 2004)	No. 57 (May 2001)	Second round (RG '00, RG '01)	Champion (2000)	Eligible
(Spain) Sergi Bruguera	39 years, 90 days	No. 3 (August 1994)	Champion (RG '93, RG '94)	Quarterfinals (1994)	Eligible
(Sweden) Thomas Enqvist	36 years, 34 days	No. 4 (November 1999)	Runner-up (1999 Australian Open)	Runner-up (1996)	Eligible
(South Africa) Wayne Ferreira	38 years, 213 days	No. 6 (May 1995)	Semifinals (AO '92, AO '03)	Quarterfinals (1995, 1996, 1997)	Wild card
(Croatia) Goran Ivanišević	38 years, 215 days	No. 2 (July 1994)	Champion (2001 Wimbledon)	Semifinals (1989)	Eligible
(Sweden) Mikael Pernfors	46 years, 274 days	No. 10 (September 1986)	Runner-up (1986 French Open)	Runner-up (1986)	Eligible

* - at start of tournament.

=== Group stage ===
==== Group A ====
	(Spain) Balcells	(Spain) Bruguera	(Croatia) Ivanišević	RR W–L	Set W–L	Game W–L	Standings
(Spain) Joan Balcells		6–2, 6–4	Not played	1–0	2–0 (100%)	12–6 (66.6%)	2nd place, silver medalist(s)
(Spain) Sergi Bruguera	2–6, 4–6		7–6^{(7–3)}, 3–6, [8–10]	0–2	1–4 (20.0%)	16–25 (39.0%)	3
(Croatia) Goran Ivanišević	Not played	6–7^{(3–7)}, 6–3, [10–8]		1–0	2–1 (66.6%)	13–10 (56.5%)	1st place, gold medalist(s)

==== Group B ====
		(Sweden) Enqvist	(South Africa) Ferreira	(Sweden) Pernfors	RR W–L	Set W–L	Game W–L	Standings
	(Sweden) Thomas Enqvist		4–6, 6–4, [11–9]	Not played	1–0	2–1 (66.6%)	11–10 (52.4%)	1st place, gold medalist(s)
WC	(South Africa) Wayne Ferreira	6–4, 4–6, [9–11]		6–3, 6–3	1–1	3–2 (60.0%)	22–17 (56.4%)	2nd place, silver medalist(s)
	(Sweden) Mikael Pernfors	Not played	3–6, 3–6		0–1	0–2 (0.0%)	6–12 (33.3%)	3

=== Final four ===
==== Third-place playoff ====
Third-place playoff
(Spain) Joan Balcells	6	6
(South Africa) Wayne Ferreira (WC)	0	3

==== Final ====
Final
(Croatia) Goran Ivanišević	6	6
(Sweden) Thomas Enqvist	4	4
