= 2026 Barcelona Open Banc Sabadell – Doubles =

Doubles
- 2026 Barcelona Open Banc Sabadell

Final
- Champions: (United Kingdom) Julian Cash (United Kingdom) Lloyd Glasspool
- Runners-up: (France) Pierre-Hugues Herbert (Italy) Andrea Vavassori
- Score: 6–3, 6–4

Details
- Draw: 16
- Seeds: 4

Events
Singles	Doubles
- Barcelona Open Banc Sabadell

Julian Cash and Lloyd Glasspool defeated Pierre-Hugues Herbert and Andrea Vavassori in the final, 6–3, 6–4 to win the doubles tennis title at the 2026 Barcelona Open.

Sander Arends and Luke Johnson were the reigning champions, but they chose to compete with different partners in Munich instead.

Despite not playing this week, Horacio Zeballos regained the ATP No. 1 doubles ranking after Neal Skupski and Marcel Granollers both lost in the first round.

== Seeds ==
1. (United Kingdom) Julian Cash / (United Kingdom) Lloyd Glasspool (champions)
2. (Finland) Harri Heliövaara / (United Kingdom) Henry Patten (first round)
3. (United States) Christian Harrison / (United Kingdom) Neal Skupski (first round)
4. (El Salvador) Marcelo Arévalo / (Croatia) Mate Pavić (first round)

== Draw ==
Key

- Q = Qualifier
- WC = Wild card
- LL = Lucky loser
- Alt = Alternate
- ITF = ITF entry
- PR = Protected ranking
- SR = Special ranking
- SE = Special exempt
- JE = Junior exempt
- JR = Junior Accelerator Programme entrant
- CO = College Accelerator Programme entrant
- NG = Next Gen Accelerator Program entrant
- w/o = Walkover
- r = Retired
- d = Defaulted

=== Draw ===
First round
1	(United Kingdom) J Cash (United Kingdom) L Glasspool	7	6
(Germany) C Frantzen (Netherlands) R Haase	5	4
(Monaco) H Nys (France) É Roger-Vasselin	4	6	[10]
(Portugal) F Cabral (United Kingdom) J Salisbury	6	4	[5]
3	(United States) C Harrison (United Kingdom) N Skupski	6^{4}	6	[4]
Q	(Czech Republic) A Pavlásek (Czech Republic) P Rikl	7^{7}	3	[10]
(Argentina) M González (Argentina) A Molteni	6	7^{7}
WC	(Spain) M Granollers (Spain) P Martínez	2	6^{3}
WC	(Spain) D Rincón (Spain) O Roca Batalla	7^{7}	7^{7}
(United States) A Krajicek (Croatia) N Mektić	6^{5}	6^{2}
(France) P-H Herbert (Italy) A Vavassori	6	6
4	(El Salvador) M Arévalo (Croatia) M Pavić	4	2
(Argentina) G Andreozzi (France) M Guinard	6	6^{5}	[10]
(United States) R Cash (United States) JJ Tracy	4	7^{7}	[4]
LL	(Monaco) R Arneodo (Australia) M Polmans	6^{5}	6	[10]
2	(Finland) H Heliövaara (United Kingdom) H Patten	7^{7}	4	[5]

Quarterfinals
1	(United Kingdom) J Cash (United Kingdom) L Glasspool	7^{8}	1	[14]
(Monaco) H Nys (France) É Roger-Vasselin	6^{6}	6	[12]
Q	(Czech Republic) A Pavlásek (Czech Republic) P Rikl	5	6	[10]
(Argentina) M González (Argentina) A Molteni	7	3	[7]
WC	(Spain) D Rincón (Spain) O Roca Batalla	2	4
(France) P-H Herbert (Italy) A Vavassori	6	6
(Argentina) G Andreozzi (France) M Guinard	3	2
LL	(Monaco) R Arneodo (Australia) M Polmans	6	6

Semifinals
1	(United Kingdom) J Cash (United Kingdom) L Glasspool	6	6^{5}	[12]
Q	(Czech Republic) A Pavlásek (Czech Republic) P Rikl	3	7^{7}	[10]
(France) P-H Herbert (Italy) A Vavassori	6	6
LL	(Monaco) R Arneodo (Australia) M Polmans	4	4

Final
1	(United Kingdom) J Cash (United Kingdom) L Glasspool	6	6
(France) P-H Herbert (Italy) A Vavassori	3	4

== Qualifying ==
=== Seeds ===
1. (Monaco) Romain Arneodo / (Australia) Marc Polmans (qualifying competition, lucky losers)
2. (Czech Republic) Adam Pavlásek / (Czech Republic) Patrik Rikl (qualified)

=== Qualifiers ===
1. (Czech Republic) Adam Pavlásek / (Czech Republic) Patrik Rikl

=== Lucky losers ===
1. (Monaco) Romain Arneodo / (Australia) Marc Polmans

=== Qualifying draw ===
First round
1	(Monaco) Romain Arneodo (Australia) Marc Polmans	7^{7}	6
WC	(Spain) Àlex Martí Pujolràs (Spain) Iñaki Montes de la Torre	6^{4}	1
(Brazil) Fernando Romboli (Australia) John-Patrick Smith	4	3
2	(Czech Republic) Adam Pavlásek (Czech Republic) Patrik Rikl	6	6

Qualifying competition
1	(Monaco) Romain Arneodo (Australia) Marc Polmans	5	6^{3}
2	(Czech Republic) Adam Pavlásek (Czech Republic) Patrik Rikl	7	7^{7}
