= 2026 Barcelona Open Banc Sabadell =

- Date: 13–19 April
- Edition: 73rd
- Category: ATP Tour 500
- Draw: 32S / 16D
- Surface: Clay
- Location: Barcelona, Spain
- Venue: Real Club de Tenis Barcelona

Champions

Singles
- (France) Arthur Fils

Doubles
- (United Kingdom) Julian Cash / (United Kingdom) Lloyd Glasspool
- Barcelona Open

The 2026 Barcelona Open Banc Sabadell (also known as the Trofeu Compte de Godó) was a men's tennis tournament played on outdoor clay courts at the Real Club de Tenis Barcelona in Barcelona, Spain, from 13 to 19 April 2026. It was the 73rd edition of the event and part of the ATP Tour 500 series of the 2026 ATP Tour.

== Champions ==
=== Singles ===
- (France) Arthur Fils def. Andrey Rublev, 6–2, 7–6^{(7–2)}

=== Doubles ===
- (United Kingdom) Julian Cash / (United Kingdom) Lloyd Glasspool def. (France) Pierre-Hugues Herbert / (Italy) Andrea Vavassori, 6–3, 6–4

== Singles main-draw entrants ==
=== Seeds ===
Country	Player	Rank^{1}	Seed
ESP	Carlos Alcaraz	2	1
ITA	Lorenzo Musetti	5	2
AUS	Alex de Minaur	6	3
	Karen Khachanov	14	4
	Andrey Rublev	15	5
~~MON~~	~~Valentin Vacherot~~	~~23~~	~~6~~
GBR	Cameron Norrie	24	7
GBR	Jack Draper	25	8
FRA	Arthur Fils	28	9

- ^{1} Rankings as of 6 April 2026.

=== Other entrants ===
The following players received wildcards into the main draw:

- (Spain) Rafael Jódar
- (Spain) Martín Landaluce
- (Switzerland) Stan Wawrinka

The following players received entry from the qualifying draw:

- (Argentina) Juan Manuel Cerúndolo
- (Serbia) Hamad Medjedovic
- (Austria) Sebastian Ofner
- (United States) Ethan Quinn
- (Finland) Otto Virtanen
- (Spain) Pedro Martínez

The following player received entry as a lucky loser:

- (Argentina) Marco Trungelliti

=== Withdrawals ===
- (Canada) Félix Auger-Aliassime → replaced by (Argentina) Camilo Ugo Carabelli
- (Spain) Alejandro Davidovich Fokina → replaced by (Argentina) Sebastián Báez
- (France) Ugo Humbert → replaced by (Argentina) Mariano Navone
- (Norway) Casper Ruud → replaced by (United States) Reilly Opelka
- (United States) Learner Tien → replaced by (France) Térence Atmane
- (Monaco) Valentin Vacherot → replaced by (Argentina) Marco Trungelliti

== Doubles main-draw entrants ==
=== Seeds ===
Country	Player	Country	Player	Rank^{1}	Seed
GBR	Julian Cash	GBR	Lloyd Glasspool	9	1
FIN	Harri Heliövaara	GBR	Henry Patten	12	2
USA	Christian Harrison	GBR	Neal Skupski	12	3
ESA	Marcelo Arévalo	CRO	Mate Pavić	18	4

- Rankings are as of 6 April 2026.

=== Other entrants ===
The following pairs received wildcards into the doubles main draw:

- (Spain) Marcel Granollers / (Spain) Pedro Martínez
- (Spain) Daniel Rincón / (Spain) Oriol Roca Batalla

The following pair received entry from the qualifying draw:

- (Czech Republic) Adam Pavlásek / (Czech Republic) Patrik Rikl

The following pair received entry as lucky losers:

- (Monaco) Romain Arneodo / (Australia) Marc Polmans

=== Withdrawals ===
- (Argentina) Tomás Martín Etcheverry / (France) Corentin Moutet → replaced by (Monaco) Romain Arneodo / (Australia) Marc Polmans
