= 2026 Barcelona Open Banc Sabadell – Singles =

Singles
- 2026 Barcelona Open Banc Sabadell

Final
- Champion: (France) Arthur Fils
- Runner-up: Andrey Rublev
- Score: 6–2, 7–6^{(7–2)}

Details
- Draw: 32 (6 Q / 3 WC)
- Seeds: 8

Events
Singles	Doubles
- Barcelona Open

Arthur Fils defeated Andrey Rublev in the final, 6–2, 7–6^{(7–2)} to win the singles tennis title at the 2026 Barcelona Open. He saved two match points (in the first round against Térence Atmane) en route to his fourth career ATP Tour title, and his first since an eight-month absence from the sport due to a back injury.

Holger Rune was the reigning champion, but did not participate as he was recovering from an Achilles injury.

Despite not playing this week, Jannik Sinner retained the No. 1 singles ranking after Carlos Alcaraz withdrew from his second round match due to a wrist injury.

== Seeds ==
1. (Spain) Carlos Alcaraz (second round, withdrew)
2. (Italy) Lorenzo Musetti (quarterfinals)
3. (Australia) Alex de Minaur (second round)
4. Karen Khachanov (first round)
5. Andrey Rublev (final)
6. (Monaco) Valentin Vacherot (withdrew)
7. (United Kingdom) Cameron Norrie (quarterfinals)
8. (United Kingdom) Jack Draper (first round, retired)
9. (France) Arthur Fils (champion)

== Draw ==
Key

- Q = Qualifier
- WC = Wild card
- LL = Lucky loser
- Alt = Alternate
- ITF = ITF entry
- PR = Protected ranking
- SR = Special ranking
- SE = Special exempt
- JE = Junior exempt
- JR = Junior Accelerator Programme entrant
- CO = College Accelerator Programme entrant
- NG = Next Gen Accelerator Program entrant
- w/o = Walkover
- r = Retired
- d = Defaulted

=== Finals ===
Semifinals
5	Andrey Rublev	3	6	6
Q	(Serbia) Hamad Medjedovic	6	2	2
WC	(Spain) Rafael Jódar	6	3	2
9	(France) Arthur Fils	3	6	6

Final
5	Andrey Rublev	2	6^{2}
9	(France) Arthur Fils	6	7^{7}

=== Top half ===
First round
1	(Spain) C Alcaraz	6	6
Q	(Finland) O Virtanen	4	2
(Czech Republic) T Macháč	2	6	6
(Argentina) S Báez	6	4	1
Q	(Spain) P Martínez	2	6	4
(Italy) L Sonego	6	2	6
(Argentina) M Navone	4	5
5	A Rublev	6	7
3	(Australia) A de Minaur	7^{9}	6
Q	(Austria) S Ofner	6^{7}	4
LL	(Argentina) M Trungelliti	5	4
Q	(Serbia) H Medjedovic	7	6
(Portugal) N Borges	6	6
(France) A Mannarino	3	4
(Argentina) TM Etcheverry	3	6	4
8	(United Kingdom) J Draper	6	3	1^{r}

Second round
1	(Spain) C Alcaraz
(Czech Republic) T Macháč	w/o
(Italy) L Sonego	2	3
5	A Rublev	6	6
3	(Australia) A de Minaur	3	4
Q	(Serbia) H Medjedovic	6	6
(Portugal) N Borges	6	7^{7}
(Argentina) TM Etcheverry	3	6^{4}

Quarterfinals
(Czech Republic) T Macháč	4	3
5	A Rublev	6	6
Q	(Serbia) H Medjedovic	7^{8}	6
(Portugal) N Borges	6^{6}	2

Semifinals
5	A Rublev	3	6	6
Q	(Serbia) H Medjedovic	6	2	2

=== Bottom half ===
First round
7	(United Kingdom) C Norrie	6	6^{5}	6
WC	(Switzerland) S Wawrinka	4	7^{7}	4
(United States) R Opelka	5	6^{7}
Q	(United States) E Quinn	7	7^{9}
(Spain) J Munar	1	2
WC	(Spain) R Jódar	6	6
(Argentina) C Ugo Carabelli	6	6
4	K Khachanov	3	4
9	(France) A Fils	4	6	7^{9}
(France) T Atmane	6	4	6^{7}
(United States) B Nakashima	6	7
Q	(Argentina) JM Cerúndolo	3	5
(Peru) I Buse	4	4
(France) C Moutet	6	6
WC	(Spain) M Landaluce	5	2
2	(Italy) L Musetti	7	6

Second round
7	(United Kingdom) C Norrie	6	4	6
Q	(United States) E Quinn	3	6	4
WC	(Spain) R Jódar	6	6
(Argentina) C Ugo Carabelli	3	3
9	(France) A Fils	6	6
(United States) B Nakashima	2	3
(France) C Moutet	3	4
2	(Italy) L Musetti	6	6

Quarterfinals
7	(United Kingdom) C Norrie	3	2
WC	(Spain) R Jódar	6	6
9	(France) A Fils	6	6
2	(Italy) L Musetti	3	4

Semifinals
WC	(Spain) R Jódar	6	3	2
9	(France) A Fils	3	6	6

== Qualifying ==
=== Seeds ===
1. (United States) Ethan Quinn (qualified)
2. (Argentina) Juan Manuel Cerúndolo (qualified)
3. (Argentina) Marco Trungelliti (qualifying competition, lucky loser)
4. (Austria) Sebastian Ofner (qualified)
5. (Serbia) Hamad Medjedovic (qualified)
6. (Australia) Aleksandar Vukic (first round)
7. (France) Alexandre Müller (qualifying competition)
8. (France) Quentin Halys (qualifying competition)
9. (Spain) Pablo Carreño Busta (first round, retired)
10. (United States) Patrick Kypson (qualifying competition)
11. (Spain) Daniel Mérida (qualifying competition)
12. (France) Benjamin Bonzi (first round)

=== Qualifiers ===
1. (United States) Ethan Quinn
2. (Argentina) Juan Manuel Cerúndolo
3. (Spain) Pedro Martínez
4. (Austria) Sebastian Ofner
5. (Serbia) Hamad Medjedovic
6. (Finland) Otto Virtanen

=== Lucky loser ===
1. (Argentina) Marco Trungelliti

=== Qualifying draw ===
==== First qualifier ====
First round
1	(United States) Ethan Quinn	2	7^{11}	6
(Georgia (country)) Nikoloz Basilashvili	6	6^{9}	4
(Italy) Francesco Maestrelli	5	4
11/WC	(Spain) Daniel Mérida	7	6

Qualifying competition
1	(United States) Ethan Quinn	6	6
11/WC	(Spain) Daniel Mérida	3	1

==== Second qualifier ====
First round
2	(Argentina) Juan Manuel Cerúndolo	6	7
(Italy) Giulio Zeppieri	1	5
(Netherlands) Jesper de Jong	6	6
12	(France) Benjamin Bonzi	4	1

Qualifying competition
2	(Argentina) Juan Manuel Cerúndolo	6	6
(Netherlands) Jesper de Jong	4	4

==== Third qualifier ====
First round
3	(Argentina) Marco Trungelliti	6	4	6
WC	(Norway) Nicolai Budkov Kjær	4	6	4
(Spain) Pedro Martínez	6	4
9	(Spain) Pablo Carreño Busta	3	3^{r}

Qualifying competition
3	(Argentina) Marco Trungelliti	7	6^{5}	1
(Spain) Pedro Martínez	5	7^{7}	6

==== Fourth qualifier ====
First round
4	(Austria) Sebastian Ofner	6	6
WC	(Spain) Alejo Sánchez Quílez	4	4
Alt	(France) Arthur Géa	1	4
10	(United States) Patrick Kypson	6	6

Qualifying competition
4	(Austria) Sebastian Ofner	6	6
10	(United States) Patrick Kypson	4	4

==== Fifth qualifier ====
First round
5	(Serbia) Hamad Medjedovic	7^{15}	6
(Lithuania) Vilius Gaubas	6^{13}	4
(Italy) Matteo Arnaldi	1	7^{7}	6^{2}
8	(France) Quentin Halys	6	6^{1}	7^{7}

Qualifying competition
5	(Serbia) Hamad Medjedovic	6	3	7^{8}
8	(France) Quentin Halys	2	6	6^{6}

==== Sixth qualifier ====
First round
6	(Australia) Aleksandar Vukic	3	7^{9}	4
(Finland) Otto Virtanen	6	6^{7}	6
WC	(Spain) Max Alcalá Gurri	2	2
7	(France) Alexandre Müller	6	6

Qualifying competition
(Finland) Otto Virtanen	6	6
7	(France) Alexandre Müller	4	4
