= 2005 Torneo Godó =

- Date: 18–24 April
- Edition: 53rd
- Category: International Series Gold
- Draw: 56S / 28D
- Prize money: $900,000
- Surface: Clay / outdoor
- Location: Barcelona, Catalonia, Spain
- Venue: Real Club de Tenis Barcelona

Champions

Singles
- (Spain) Rafael Nadal

Doubles
- (India) Leander Paes / (Serbia and Montenegro) Nenad Zimonjić
← 2004 ·	Torneo Godó	· 2006 →

The 2005 Torneo Godó was a men's professional tennis tournament that was part of the International Series Gold of the 2005 ATP Tour. It was the 53rd edition of the Torneo Godó tennis tournament and it took place from 18 April until 24 April 2005 at the Real Club de Tenis Barcelona in Barcelona, Catalonia, Spain. Eighth-seeded Rafael Nadal won the singles title.

== Finals ==
=== Singles ===
(Spain) Rafael Nadal defeated (Spain) Juan Carlos Ferrero, 6–1, 7–6, 6–3

- It was Nadal's 4th singles title of the year and the 5th of his career.

=== Doubles ===
(India) Leander Paes / (Serbia and Montenegro) Nenad Zimonjić defeated (Spain) Feliciano López / (Spain) Rafael Nadal, 6–3, 6–3
