= 2025 Barcelona Open Banc Sabadell – Singles =

Singles
- 2025 Barcelona Open Banc Sabadell

Final
- Champion: (Denmark) Holger Rune
- Runner-up: (Spain) Carlos Alcaraz
- Score: 7–6^{(8–6)}, 6–2

Details
- Draw: 32 (6 Q / 3 WC)
- Seeds: 8

Events
Singles	Doubles
- Barcelona Open

Holger Rune defeated Carlos Alcaraz in the final, 7–6^{(8–6)}, 6–2 to win the singles tennis title at the 2025 Barcelona Open. It was his fifth career ATP Tour title, and his first since the 2023 BMW Open.

Casper Ruud was the defending champion, but lost in the quarterfinals to Rune.

== Seeds ==
1. (Spain) Carlos Alcaraz (final)
2. (Norway) Casper Ruud (quarterfinals)
3. (Greece) Stefanos Tsitsipas (quarterfinals, retired)
4. Andrey Rublev (second round)
5. (Australia) Alex de Minaur (quarterfinals)
6. (Denmark) Holger Rune (champion)
7. (France) Arthur Fils (semifinals)
8. (Italy) Lorenzo Musetti (withdrew)
9. (United States) Frances Tiafoe (first round)

== Draw ==
Key

- Q = Qualifier
- WC = Wild card
- LL = Lucky loser
- Alt = Alternate
- ITF = ITF entry
- PR = Protected ranking
- SR = Special ranking
- SE = Special exempt
- JE = Junior exempt
- JR = Junior Accelerator Programme entrant
- CO = College Accelerator Programme entrant
- NG = Next Gen Accelerator Program entrant
- w/o = Walkover
- r = Retired
- d = Defaulted

=== Finals ===
Semifinals
1	(Spain) Carlos Alcaraz	6	6
7	(France) Arthur Fils	2	4
Karen Khachanov	3	2
6	(Denmark) Holger Rune	6	6

Final
1	(Spain) Carlos Alcaraz	6^{6}	2
6	(Denmark) Holger Rune	7^{8}	6

=== Top half ===
First round
1	(Spain) C Alcaraz	6	7^{8}
Q	(United States) E Quinn	2	6^{6}
Q	(Serbia) L Djere	6^{2}	6	6
LL	(France) A Rinderknech	7^{7}	1	2
(Spain) R Carballés Baena	1	5
LL	(United Kingdom) J Fearnley	6	7
(Argentina) TM Etcheverry	4	4
5	(Australia) A de Minaur	6	6
3	(Greece) S Tsitsipas	6	6
PR	(United States) R Opelka	2	2
(Italy) M Arnaldi	6	3	2
(United States) S Korda	3	6	6
(Spain) P Martínez	7	5	6
(United States) B Nakashima	5	7	4
WC	(Spain) P Carreño Busta	6^{6}	3
7	(France) A Fils	7^{8}	6

Second round
1	(Spain) C Alcaraz	6	6
Q	(Serbia) L Djere	2	4
LL	(United Kingdom) J Fearnley	1	2
5	(Australia) A de Minaur	6	6
3	(Greece) S Tsitsipas	7^{7}	6
(United States) S Korda	6^{4}	4
(Spain) P Martínez	3	2
7	(France) A Fils	6	6

Quarterfinals
1	(Spain) C Alcaraz	7	6
5	(Australia) A de Minaur	5	3
3	(Greece) S Tsitsipas	0^{r}
7	(France) A Fils	2

Semifinals
1	(Spain) C Alcaraz	6	6
7	(France) A Fils	2	4

=== Bottom half ===
First round
9	(United States) F Tiafoe	6	5	1
(Spain) J Munar	2	7	6
K Khachanov	6^{3}	6	6
Q	(United Kingdom) C Norrie	7^{7}	4	3
WC	(Switzerland) S Wawrinka	1	4
(Spain) A Davidovich Fokina	6	6
Q	(Netherlands) J de Jong	1	3
4	A Rublev	6	6
6	(Denmark) H Rune	7	6
WC	(Spain) A Ramos Viñolas	5	4
(Argentina) S Báez	6	7
LL	(Bosnia and Herzegovina) D Džumhur	1	5
Q	(Serbia) H Medjedovic	7	7^{8}
(France) G Mpetshi Perricard	5	6^{6}
Q	(Colombia) DE Galán	4	3
2	(Norway) C Ruud	6	6

Second round
(Spain) J Munar	5	4
K Khachanov	7	6
(Spain) A Davidovich Fokina	7	6
4	A Rublev	5	4
6	(Denmark) H Rune	4	6	6
(Argentina) S Báez	6	1	2
Q	(Serbia) H Medjedovic	5	5
2	(Norway) C Ruud	7	7

Quarterfinals
K Khachanov	6	7
(Spain) A Davidovich Fokina	4	5
6	(Denmark) H Rune	6	6
2	(Norway) C Ruud	4	2

Semifinals
K Khachanov	3	2
6	(Denmark) H Rune	6	6

== Qualifying ==
=== Seeds ===
1. (France) Benjamin Bonzi (first round)
2. (Argentina) Camilo Ugo Carabelli (withdrew)
3. (Bosnia and Herzegovina) Damir Džumhur (qualifying competition, lucky loser)
4. (Italy) Mattia Bellucci (first round)
5. (Argentina) Mariano Navone (entered main draw in Munich)
6. (Serbia) Hamad Medjedovic (qualified)
7. (United Kingdom) Jacob Fearnley (qualifying competition, lucky loser)
8. (France) Arthur Rinderknech (qualifying competition, lucky loser)
9. (France) Corentin Moutet (first round)
10. (Serbia) Laslo Djere (qualified)
11. (Canada) Gabriel Diallo (qualifying competition)
12. (France) Hugo Gaston (first round)

=== Qualifiers ===
1. (Serbia) Laslo Djere
2. (Colombia) Daniel Elahi Galán
3. (United Kingdom) Cameron Norrie
4. (United States) Ethan Quinn
5. (Netherlands) Jesper de Jong
6. (Serbia) Hamad Medjedovic

=== Lucky losers ===
1. (Bosnia and Herzegovina) Damir Džumhur
2. (France) Arthur Rinderknech
3. (United Kingdom) Jacob Fearnley

=== Qualifying draw ===
==== First qualifier ====
First round
1	(France) Benjamin Bonzi	2	4
WC	(Spain) Daniel Rincón	6	6
(Argentina) Federico Coria	5	0^{r}
10	(Serbia) Laslo Djere	7	0

Qualifying competition
WC	(Spain) Daniel Rincón	3	5
10	(Serbia) Laslo Djere	6	7

==== Second qualifier ====
First round
Alt	(Georgia (country)) Nikoloz Basilashvili	3	3
(Colombia) Daniel Elahi Galán	6	6
WC	(Sweden) Leo Borg	5	6^{1}
7	(United Kingdom) Jacob Fearnley	7	7^{7}

Qualifying competition
(Colombia) Daniel Elahi Galán	7	6
7	(United Kingdom) Jacob Fearnley	5	4

==== Third qualifier ====
First round
3	(Bosnia and Herzegovina) Damir Džumhur	7^{7}	6
WC	(Spain) Max Alcalá Gurri	6^{4}	0
(United Kingdom) Cameron Norrie	6	6
12	(France) Hugo Gaston	2	3

Qualifying competition
3	(Bosnia and Herzegovina) Damir Džumhur	6^{5}	6^{6}
(United Kingdom) Cameron Norrie	7^{7}	7^{8}

==== Fourth qualifier ====
First round
4	(Italy) Mattia Bellucci	2	4
(Croatia) Borna Ćorić	6	6
Alt	(United States) Ethan Quinn	2	6	7
9	(France) Corentin Moutet	6	3	5

Qualifying competition
(Croatia) Borna Ćorić	6	4	3
Alt	(United States) Ethan Quinn	2	6	6

==== Fifth qualifier ====
First round
Alt	(South Africa) Lloyd Harris	3	6^{0}
(Netherlands) Jesper de Jong	6	7^{7}
(Slovakia) Jozef Kovalík	6^{2}	6	3
8	(France) Arthur Rinderknech	7^{7}	2	6

Qualifying competition
(Netherlands) Jesper de Jong	6	7
8	(France) Arthur Rinderknech	3	5

==== Sixth qualifier ====
First round
6	(Serbia) Hamad Medjedovic	7^{7}	4	6
(Bolivia) Hugo Dellien	6^{1}	6	3
WC	(Spain) Martín Landaluce	2	4
11	(Canada) Gabriel Diallo	6	6

Qualifying competition
6	(Serbia) Hamad Medjedovic	6	6
11	(Canada) Gabriel Diallo	4	4
