= 2006 Torneo Godó – Singles =

Singles
- 2006 Torneo Godó

Final
- Champion: (Spain) Rafael Nadal
- Runner-up: (Spain) Tommy Robredo
- Score: 6–4, 6–4, 6–0

Details
- Draw: 56 (5WC/7Q)
- Seeds: 16

Events
Singles	Doubles
← 2005 ·	Barcelona Open	· 2007 →

Defending champion Rafael Nadal defeated Tommy Robredo in the final, 6–4, 6–4, 6–0 to win the singles title at the 2006 Barcelona Open. With the win, Nadal achieved 47 consecutive matches won on clay, surpassing the previous record made by Björn Borg.

== Seeds ==
1. (Spain) Rafael Nadal (champion)
2. (Russia) Nikolay Davydenko (first round)
3. (Argentina) Guillermo Coria (third round)
4. (Czech Republic) Radek Štěpánek (quarterfinals)
5. (Spain) David Ferrer (third round)
6. (Spain) Tommy Robredo (final)
7. (Finland) Jarkko Nieminen (quarterfinals)
8. (Slovakia) Dominik Hrbatý (first round)
9. (Czech Republic) Tomáš Berdych (second round)
10. (Spain) Juan Carlos Ferrero (quarterfinals)
11. (Russia) Igor Andreev (first round)
12. (Spain) Fernando Verdasco (third round)
13. (France) Gaël Monfils (second round)
14. (Russia) Dmitry Tursunov (first round)
15. (Spain) Carlos Moyà (first round)
16. (Thailand) Paradorn Srichaphan (first round)

== Draw ==
=== Key ===
- WC - Wildcard
- Q - Qualifier
- LL - Lucky loser

=== Finals ===
Quarterfinals
1	(Spain) Rafael Nadal	4	6	6
7	(Finland) Jarkko Nieminen	6	4	3
(Spain) Nicolás Almagro	6	6
10	(Spain) Juan Carlos Ferrero	3	3
6	(Spain) Tommy Robredo	6	6
4	(Czech Republic) Radek Štěpánek	3	2
(Switzerland) Stanislas Wawrinka	4	6	6
(Croatia) Ivo Karlović	6	3	4

Semifinals
1	(Spain) Rafael Nadal	7^{7}	6
(Spain) Nicolás Almagro	6^{2}	3
6	(Spain) Tommy Robredo	6	6
(Switzerland) Stanislas Wawrinka	4	4

Finals
1	(Spain) Rafael Nadal	6	6	6
6	(Spain) Tommy Robredo	4	4	0

=== Top half ===
==== Section 1 ====
First round
(Spain) López	4	6	6
(Slovakia) Klec	6	4	4
Q	(Spain) Gimeno-Traver	6	3	6
(Serbia and Montenegro) Djokovic	4	6	3
Q	(Spain) Navarro	6	6
16	(Thailand) Srichaphan	3	4
9	(Czech Republic) Berdych	4	7	7
(Spain) Montañés	6	5	5
(Spain) Portas	6	6
(Spain) Hernández	2	4
(Germany) Kohlschreiber	7^{7}	7^{7}
(Netherlands) Sluiter	6^{5}	6^{2}

Second round
1	(Spain) Nadal	6	6
(Spain) López	4	2
Q	(Spain) Gimeno-Traver	6^{5}	5
Q	(Spain) Navarro	7^{7}	7
9	(Czech Republic) Berdych	6^{6}	3
(Spain) Portas	7^{8}	6
(Germany) Kohlschreiber	1	2
7	(Finland) Nieminen	6	6

Third round
1	(Spain) Nadal	6	6
Q	(Spain) Navarro	4	2
(Spain) Portas	3	2
7	(Finland) Nieminen	6	6

Quarterfinals
1	(Spain) Nadal	4	6	6
7	(Finland) Nieminen	6	4	3

==== Section 2 ====
First round
(Czech Republic) Zíb	7^{7}	6^{3}	2
WC	(Spain) Blanco	6^{3}	7^{7}	6
(Romania) Pavel	4	2
(Spain) Almagro	6	6
Q	(Italy) Galvani	2	5
13	(France) Monfils	6	7
10	(Spain) Ferrero	6	6
(Belgium) Vliegen	1	2
(Spain) Martín	6	6
WC	(Spain) Salvà	4	2
(United States) Spadea	6^{7}	6	1
WC	(Spain) Costa	7^{9}	4	6

Second round
3	(Argentina) Coria	6^{4}	6	6
WC	(Spain) Blanco	7^{7}	0	2
(Spain) Almagro	6	6
13	(France) Monfils	2	4
10	(Spain) Ferrero	6	7^{7}
(Spain) Martín	4	6^{1}
WC	(Spain) Costa	6	7
8	(Slovakia) Hrbatý	3	5

Third round
3	(Argentina) Coria	2	0
(Spain) Almagro	6	6
10	(Spain) Ferrrero	6	5	7
WC	(Spain) Costa	1	7	5

Quarterfinals
(Spain) Almagro	6	6
10	(Spain) Ferrero	3	3

=== Bottom half ===
==== Section 3 ====
First round
(Italy) Starace	6	6
(Czech Republic) Dlouhý	4	2
(Argentina) Calleri	6	6
(United States) Gimelstob	2	1
(Czech Republic) Vik	3	4
12	(Spain) Verdasco	6	6
14	(Russia) Tursunov	6	0	3
WC	(Spain) Cuadrado	4	6	6
(France) Mathieu	7^{7}	6
(Costa Rica) Marín	6^{3}	2
(Italy) Volandri	6	6
Q	(Italy) Stoppini	3	1

Second round
6	(Spain) Robredo	6	6
(Italy) Starace	4	0
(Argentina) Calleri	5	4
12	(Spain) Verdasco	7	6
WC	(Spain) Cuadrado	6^{4}	4
(France) Mathieu	7^{7}	6
(Italy) Volandri	6	6^{0}	4
4	(Czech Republic) Štěpánek	3	7^{7}	6

Third round
6	(Spain) Robredo	6	2	6
12	(Spain) Verdasco	3	6	2
(France) Mathieu	6	3	2
4	(Czech Republic) Štěpánek	1	6	6

Quarterfinals
6	(Spain) Robredo	6	6
4	(Czech Republic) Štěpánek	3	2

==== Section 4 ====
First round
WC	(Spain) Granollers-Pujol	6	4	2
(United Kingdom) Murray	4	6	6
(Switzerland) Wawrinka	6	6^{3}	6
(Ecuador) Lapentti	2	7^{7}	3
(Russia) Gabashvili	4	7^{8}	7^{7}
11	(Russia) Andreev	6	6^{6}	6^{4}
15	(Spain) Moyà	5	4
Q	(Russia) Korolev	7	6
Q	(Spain) Calatrava	6^{4}	4
(Spain) Vicente	7^{7}	6
(Croatia) Karlović	6	6
(Belarus) Mirnyi	3	4

Second round
5	(Spain) Ferrer	4	7^{7}	6
(United Kingdom) Murray	6	6^{4}	1
(Switzerland) Wawrinka	6	6^{4}	6
(Russia) Gabashvili	4	7^{7}	4
Q	(Russia) Korolev	6	6	1
(Italy) Vicente	3	0
(Croatia) Karlović	6^{7}	7	6
2	(Russia) Davydenko	7^{9}	5	4

Third round
5	(Spain) Ferrer	6	1	1
(Switzerland) Wawrinka	2	6	6
Q	(Russia) Korolev	7^{7}	6^{4}	6^{5}
(Croatia) Karlović	6^{4}	7^{7}	7^{7}

Quarterfinals
(Switzerland) Wawrinka	4	6	6
(Croatia) Karlović	6	3	4

== Qualifying ==
=== Qualifying draw ===
1. (Spain) Iván Navarro Pastor (qualified)
2. (Russia) Evgeny Korolev (qualified)
3. (Spain) Álex Calatrava (qualified)
4. (Italy) Stefano Galvani (qualified)
5. (Spain) Daniel Gimeno Traver (qualified)
6. (Spain) Santiago Ventura (first round)
7. (Greece) Konstantinos Economidis (qualifying competition)
8. (Switzerland) Michael Lammer (first round)
9. (Slovakia) Ivo Klec (qualified)
10. (Italy) Andrea Stoppini (qualified)
11. (Spain) Marc López (first round)
12. (Italy) Simone Vagnozzi (qualifying competition)
13. (Spain) Héctor Ruiz-Cadenas (qualifying competition)
14. (Russia) Yuri Schukin (first round)

=== Qualifiers ===
1. (Spain) Iván Navarro Pastor
2. (Russia) Evgeny Korolev
3. (Spain) Álex Calatrava
4. (Italy) Stefano Galvani
5. (Spain) Daniel Gimeno Traver
6. (Slovakia) Ivo Klec
7. (Italy) Andrea Stoppini

=== Qualifying draw ===
==== First qualifier ====
First round
1	(Spain) Iván Navarro Pastor	4	6	6
WC	(Spain) Albert Ramos Viñolas	6	4	0
(Argentina) Nicolás Todero	5	1
13	(Spain) Héctor Ruiz-Cadenas	7	6

Qualifying competition
1	(Spain) Iván Navarro Pastor	7	6
13	(Spain) Héctor Ruiz-Cadenas	5	3

==== Second qualifier ====
First round
2	(Russia) Evgeny Korolev	6	6
WC	(Spain) Ignacio Coll Riudavets	3	3
(Spain) David Marrero	7^{7}	6
14	(Russia) Yuri Schukin	6^{3}	3

Qualifying competition
2	(Russia) Evgeny Korolev	4	6	6
(Spain) David Marrero	6	4	2

==== Third qualifier ====
First round
3	(Spain) Álex Calatrava	3	6	6
(China) Yu Xinyuan	6	0	3
(United Kingdom) James Auckland	4	4
12	(Italy) Simone Vagnozzi	6	6

Qualifying competition
3	(Spain) Álex Calatrava	6	6
12	(Italy) Simone Vagnozzi	2	1

==== Fourth qualifier ====
First round
4	(Italy) Stefano Galvani	4	6	6
(Italy) Marco Pedrini	6	3	3
Alt	(Spain) Didac Pérez	6	3	6
8	(Switzerland) Michael Lammer	4	6	2

Qualifying competition
4	(Italy) Stefano Galvani	6	6
Alt	(Spain) Didac Pérez	2	2

==== Fifth qualifier ====
First round
5	(Spain) Daniel Gimeno Traver	7	4	6
(Spain) Javier Genaro Martínez	5	6	1
(Spain) José Antonio Sánchez de Luna	7^{7}	7^{14}
11	(Spain) Marc López	6^{5}	6^{12}

Qualifying competition
5	(Spain) Daniel Gimeno Traver	6	6
(Spain) José Antonio Sánchez de Luna	2	2

==== Sixth qualifier ====
First round
6	(Spain) Santiago Ventura	6	3	1
(Australia) Rameez Junaid	4	6	6
WC	(Bulgaria) Georgi Rumenov Payakov	5	0
9	(Slovakia) Ivo Klec	7	6

Qualifying competition
(Australia) Rameez Junaid	6^{3}	1
9	(Slovakia) Ivo Klec	7^{7}	6

==== Seventh qualifier ====
First round
7	(Greece) Konstantinos Economidis	6	6
(Spain) Carles Poch Gradin	4	2
WC	(Spain) Borja Martínez	4	1
10	(Italy) Andrea Stoppini	6	6

Qualifying competition
7	(Greece) Konstantinos Economidis	3	3
10	(Italy) Andrea Stoppini	6	6
