= 2006 Torneo Godó =

- Date: 24–30 April
- Edition: 54th
- Category: International Series Gold
- Draw: 56S / 28D
- Prize money: $900,000
- Surface: Clay / Outdoor
- Location: Barcelona, Catalonia, Spain
- Venue: Real Club de Tenis Barcelona

Champions

Singles
- (Spain) Rafael Nadal

Doubles
- (The Bahamas) Mark Knowles / (Canada) Daniel Nestor
← 2005 ·	Barcelona Open	· 2007 →

The 2006 Torneo Godó was a men's professional tennis tournament that was part of the International Series Gold of the 2006 ATP Tour. It was the 54th edition of the Torneo Godó and it took place from 24 April until 30 April 2006 in Barcelona, Catalonia, Spain. First-seeded Rafael Nadal won the singles title.

The event also featured a seniors' tournament that was part of the ATP Champions Tour, which was held from 20 to 23 April. Sergi Bruguera won the title.

== Finals ==
=== Singles ===
(Spain) Rafael Nadal defeated (Spain) Tommy Robredo, 6–4, 6–4, 6–0

=== Doubles ===
(The Bahamas) Mark Knowles / (Canada) Daniel Nestor defeated (Poland) Mariusz Fyrstenberg / (Poland) Marcin Matkowski, 6–2, 6–7^{(4–7)}, [10–5]

=== Seniors ===
(Spain) Sergi Bruguera defeated (Spain) Carlos Costa, 6–1, 6–4
