= 2005 Torneo Godó – Singles =

Singles
- 2005 Torneo Godó

Final
- Champion: (Spain) Rafael Nadal
- Runner-up: (Spain) Juan Carlos Ferrero
- Score: 6–1, 7–6^{(7–4)}, 6–3

Events
Singles	Doubles
- Torneo Godó

Rafael Nadal defeated Juan Carlos Ferrero in the final, 6–1, 7–6^{(7–4)}, 6–3 to win the singles tennis title at the 2005 Barcelona Open. With the win, Nadal entered the top 10 in singles of the ATP rankings for the first time, debuting at No. 7.

Tommy Robredo was the defending champion, but lost to Alberto Martín in the second round.

This tournament marked the first ATP Tour-level appearance of future world No. 1, two-time Olympic gold medalist, and three-time major champion Andy Murray. He lost to Jan Hernych in the first round.

== Seeds ==
1. (Russia) Marat Safin (second round)
2. (Argentina) Gastón Gaudio (quarterfinals)
3. (Spain) Carlos Moyà (third round)
4. (Argentina) Guillermo Coria (third round)
5. (Argentina) Guillermo Cañas (third round)
6. (Spain) Tommy Robredo (first round)
7. (Russia) Nikolay Davydenko (semifinals)
8. (Spain) Rafael Nadal (champion)
9. (Sweden) Thomas Johansson (third round)
10. (Slovakia) Dominik Hrbatý (third round)
11. (Czech Republic) Radek Štěpánek (semifinals)
12. (Spain) Feliciano López (second round)
13. (Spain) David Ferrer (third round)
14. (Argentina) Juan Ignacio Chela (second round)
15. (Thailand) Paradorn Srichaphan (second round)
16. (Russia) Igor Andreev (first round)

== Draw ==
=== Key ===
- WC - Wildcard
- Q - Qualifier
- LL - Lucky loser

=== Finals ===
Quarterfinals
Q	(Switzerland) Stanislas Wawrinka	6	3	2
11	(Czech Republic) Radek Štěpánek	3	6	6
(Argentina) Agustín Calleri	2	0^{r}
8	(Spain) Rafael Nadal	6	3
7	(Russia) Nikolay Davydenko	6	6
(Belarus) Max Mirnyi	4	4
(Spain) Juan Carlos Ferrero	6	4	6
2	(Argentina) Gastón Gaudio	4	6	3

Semifinals
11	(Czech Republic) Radek Štěpánek	5	2
8	(Spain) Rafael Nadal	7	6
7	(Russia) Nikolay Davydenko	6^{1}	1
(Spain) Juan Carlos Ferrero	7^{7}	6

Finals
8	(Spain) Rafael Nadal	6	7^{7}	6
(Spain) Juan Carlos Ferrero	1	6^{4}	3

=== Earlier rounds ===
==== Section 1 ====
First round
(Argentina) Acasuso	7	6
WC	(Spain) Vicente	5	4
Q	(Switzerland) Wawrinka	6	6
(Spain) García López	3	1
(Denmark) Carlsen	2	1
15	(Thailand) Srichaphan	6	6
11	(Czech Republic) Štěpánek	4	6	7
(Georgia (country)) Labadze	6	2	5
WC	(Spain) Blanco	3	3
(Spain) Ventura	6	6
(Australia) Arthurs	6	6
Q	(Spain) Ramírez Hidalgo	4	3

Second round
1	(Russia) Safin	4	4
(Argentina) Acasuso	6	6
Q	(Switzerland) Wawrinka	1	6	7^{7}
15	(Thailand) Srichaphan	6	3	6^{3}
11	(Czech Republic) Štěpánek	6	6
(Spain) Ventura	3	2
(Australia) Arthurs	5	6^{3}
7	(Argentina) Cañas	7	7^{7}

Third round
(Argentina) Acasuso	3	4
Q	(Switzerland) Wawrinka	6	6
11	(Czech Republic) Štěpánek	6^{6}	7^{7}	7^{7}
5	(Argentina) Cañas	7^{8}	6^{2}	6^{5}

Quarterfinals
Q	(Switzerland) Wawrinka	6	3	2
11	(Czech Republic) Štěpánek	3	6	6

==== Section 2 ====
First round
(France) Saulnier	3	3
(Netherlands) Wessels	6	6
(Argentina) Calleri	7^{7}	7^{7}
Q	(France) Monfils	6^{2}	6^{2}
Q	(Spain) Portas	4	6^{2}
14	(Argentina) Chela	6	7^{7}
10	(Slovakia) Hrbatý	6	6
(France) Haehnel	1	1
(Italy) Starace	6	6
Q	(Russia) Gabashvili	1	1
WC	(Spain) M. López	4	6^{2}
(Luxembourg) Müller	6	7^{7}

Second round
4	(Argentina) Coria	6	6^{4}	6
(Netherlands) Wessels	2	7^{7}	4
(Argentina) Calleri	6	6^{9}	7^{7}
14	(Argentina) Chela	3	7^{11}	6^{1}
10	(Slovakia) Hrbatý	6	6
(Italy) Starace	3	2
(Luxembourg) Müller	0	2
8	(Spain) Nadal	6	6

Third round
4	(Argentina) Coria	4	7^{7}	6^{2}
(Argentina) Calleri	6	6^{5}	7^{7}
10	(Slovakia) Hrbatý	1	2
8	(Spain) Nadal	6	6

Quarterfinals
(Argentina) Calleri	2	0^{r}
8	(Spain) Nadal	6	3

==== Section 3 ====
First round
Q	(Spain) Fogués	7^{12}	1	6
(Belgium) Rochus	6^{10}	6	3
(Belgium) Malisse	6	6
(Germany) Kohlschreiber	1	2
(Austria) Koubek	2	1
9	(Sweden) Johansson	6	6
16	(Russia) Andreev	3	6	3
(Argentina) Mónaco	6	2	6
(Belarus) Mirnyi	7^{7}	3	7^{7}
(Spain) Costa	6^{4}	6	6^{2}
(South Korea) Lee	4	6^{4}
Q	(Finland) Nieminen	6	7^{7}

Second round
7	(Russia) Davydenko	6	6
Q	(Spain) Fogués	3	2
(Belgium) Malisse	5	5
9	(Sweden) Johansson	7	7
(Argentina) Mónaco	6^{3}	2
(Belarus) Mirnyi	7^{7}	6
Q	(Finland) Nieminen	5	7	2
3	(Spain) Moyà	7	5	6

Third round
7	(Russia) Davydenko	6	6^{3}	7^{7}
9	(Sweden) Johansson	3	7^{7}	6^{2}
(Belarus) Mirnyi	6	6
3	(Spain) Moyà	4	4

Quarterfinals
7	(Russia) Davydenko	6	6
(Belarus) Mirnyi	4	4

==== Section 4 ====
First round
(Morocco) El Aynaoui	4	3
(Spain) Martín	6	6
(Spain) Montañés	3	6	5
(Spain) Ferrero	6	3	7
(Spain) Almagro	4	2
12	(Spain) F. López	6	6
13	(Spain) Ferrer	6	6
(Spain) Verdasco	3	4
WC	(United Kingdom) Murray	6	4	4
(Czech Republic) Hernych	3	6	6
(Spain) Mantilla	6	6
(France) Llodra	2	1

Second round
6	(Spain) Robredo	1	4
(Spain) Martín	6	6
(Spain) Ferrero	6	6
12	(Spain) F. López	4	4
13	(Spain) Ferrer	6	6
(Czech Republic) Hernych	2	3
(Spain) Mantilla	4	2
2	(Argentina) Gaudio	6	6

Third round
(Spain) Martín	1	2
(Spain) Ferrero	6	6
13	(Spain) Ferrer	3	4
2	(Argentina) Gaudio	6	6

Quarterfinals
(Spain) Ferrero	6	4	6
2	(Argentina) Gaudio	4	6	3

Qualifying Draw
