= 2006 Torneo Godó – Doubles =

Doubles
- 2006 Torneo Godó

Final
- Champions: (The Bahamas) Mark Knowles; (Canada) Daniel Nestor
- Runners-up: (Poland) Mariusz Fyrstenberg; (Poland) Marcin Matkowski
- Score: 6–2, 6–7^{(4–7)}, [10–5]

Events
Singles	Doubles
- Torneo Godó

Leander Paes and Nenad Zimonjić were the defending champions, but they did not participate together this year. Paes partnered Martin Damm, losing in the second round. Zimonjić partnered Max Mirnyi, losing in the second round.

Mark Knowles and Daniel Nestor won in the final 6–2, 6–7^{(4–7)}, [10–5], against Mariusz Fyrstenberg and Marcin Matkowski.

== Seeds ==
All seeds receive a bye into the second round.

1. (The Bahamas) Mark Knowles / (Canada) Daniel Nestor (champions)
2. (Australia) Paul Hanley / (Zimbabwe) Kevin Ullyett (quarterfinals)
3. (Belarus) Max Mirnyi / (Serbia and Montenegro) Nenad Zimonjić (second round)
4. (Czech Republic) Martin Damm / (India) Leander Paes (second round)
5. (Israel) Jonathan Erlich / (Israel) Andy Ram (second round)
6. (Sweden) Simon Aspelin / (Australia) Todd Perry (quarterfinals)
7. (India) Mahesh Bhupathi / (Czech Republic) Leoš Friedl (semifinals)
8. (Poland) Mariusz Fyrstenberg / (Poland) Marcin Matkowski (final)

== Draw ==
Key

- Q = Qualifier
- WC = Wild card
- LL = Lucky loser
- Alt = Alternate
- ITF = ITF entry
- PR = Protected ranking
- SR = Special ranking
- SE = Special exempt
- JE = Junior exempt
- JR = Junior Accelerator Programme entrant
- CO = College Accelerator Programme entrant
- NG = Next Gen Accelerator Program entrant
- w/o = Walkover
- r = Retired
- d = Defaulted

=== Finals ===
Semifinals

Final

1
- (The Bahamas) Mark Knowles
- (Canada) Daniel Nestor
6
1
[10]

- (Czech Republic) Lukáš Dlouhý
- (Czech Republic) Pavel Vízner
1
6
[6]

1
- (The Bahamas) Mark Knowles
- (Canada) Daniel Nestor
6
6^{4}
[10]

8
- (Poland) Mariusz Fyrstenberg
- (Poland) Marcin Matkowski
2
7^{7}
[5]

8
- (Poland) Mariusz Fyrstenberg
- (Poland) Marcin Matkowski
6
3
[10]

7
- (India) Mahesh Bhupathi
- (Czech Republic) Leoš Friedl
1
6
[7]

=== Top half ===
First round

Second round

Quarterfinals

Semifinals

1
- (The Bahamas) M Knowles
- (Canada) D Nestor
6
6

WC
- (Spain) N Almagro
- (Costa Rica) J A Marín
6
6

WC
- (Spain) N Almagro
- (Costa Rica) JA Marín
4
2

- (United States) T Parrott
- (Netherlands) R Wassen
3
3

1
- (The Bahamas) M Knowles
- (Canada) D Nestor
6
6

- (Spain) A Martín
- (Spain) T Robredo
7
6^{6}
[10]

6
- (Sweden) S Aspelin
- (Australia) T Perry
3
4

- (Czech Republic) C Suk
- (Czech Republic) R Vik
5
7^{8}
[2]

- (Spain) A Martín
- (Spain) T Robredo

6
- (Sweden) S Aspelin
- (Australia) T Perry
w/o

1
- (The Bahamas) M Knowles
- (Canada) D Nestor
6
1
[10]

- (Czech Republic) L Dlouhý
- (Czech Republic) P Vízner
1
6
[6]

3
- (Belarus) M Mirnyi
- (Serbia) N Zimonjić
3
6^{5}

- (South Africa) C Haggard
- (Croatia) I Karlović
6^{4}
7
[6]

- (Czech Republic) L Dlouhý
- (Czech Republic) P Vízner
6
7^{7}

- (Czech Republic) L Dlouhý
- (Czech Republic) P Vízner
7^{7}
5
[10]

- (Czech Republic) L Dlouhý
- (Czech Republic) P Vízner
7^{7}
6

- (Slovakia) M Mertiňák
- (Czech Republic) P Pála
7^{7}
6

- (Slovakia) M Mertiňák
- (Czech Republic) P Pála
6^{4}
1

- (Sweden) R Lindstedt
- (Finland) J Nieminen
6^{4}
4

- (Slovakia) M Mertiňák
- (Czech Republic) P Pála
7^{7}
6

5
- (Israel) J Erlich
- (Israel) A Ram
6^{4}
3

=== Bottom half ===
First round

Second round

Quarterfinals

Semifinals

8
- (Poland) M Fyrstenberg
- (Poland) M Matkowski
6
6

- (United States) J Gimelstob
- (United Kingdom) A Murray
6
4
[6]

- (France) P-H Mathieu
- (France) G Monfils
4
3

- (France) P-H Mathieu
- (France) G Monfils
4
6
[10]

8
- (Poland) M Fyrstenberg
- (Poland) M Matkowski
7^{7}
7

- (South Africa) J Coetzee
- (United States) J Thomas
6
5
[7]

WC
- (Spain) M López
- (Spain) F Vicente
6^{5}
5

WC
- (Spain) M López
- (Spain) F Vicente
2
7
[10]

WC
- (Spain) M López
- (Spain) F Vicente
6
7^{9}

4
- (Czech Republic) M Damm
- (India) L Paes
4
6^{7}

8
- (Poland) M Fyrstenberg
- (Poland) M Matkowski
6
3
[10]

7
- (India) M Bhupathi
- (Czech Republic) L Friedl
1
6
[7]

7
- (India) M Bhupathi
- (Czech Republic) L Friedl
6^{5}
6
[10]

- (Romania) A Pavel
- (Thailand) P Srichaphan
5
1

Alt
- (Serbia and Montenegro) N Djokovic
- (Russia) D Tursunov
7^{7}
3
[5]

Alt
- (Serbia and Montenegro) N Djokovic
- (Russia) D Tursunov
7
6

7
- (India) M Bhupathi
- (Czech Republic) L Friedl
7^{7}
6

- (Argentina) L Arnold
- (Argentina) G Coria
3
6
[3]

2
- (Australia) P Hanley
- (Zimbabwe) K Ullyett
6^{4}
3

- (Slovakia) D Hrbatý
- (Czech Republic) J Levinský
6
3
[10]

- (Slovakia) D Hrbatý
- (Czech Republic) J Levinský
1
1

2
- (Australia) P Hanley
- (Zimbabwe) K Ullyett
6
6
