= Barcelona Open (tennis) =

Coordinates: 41.393°N 2.118°E

Barcelona Open Banc Sabadell

ATP Tour
- Founded: 1953; 73 years ago
- Editions: 73 (2026)
- Location: Barcelona; Spain
- Venue: Real Club de Tenis Barcelona
- Category: ATP Tour 500 / ATP Championship Series (since 1990); Grand Prix Tour (1972–1989)
- Surface: Clay (outdoor)
- Draw: 32S / 24Q / 16D (from 2025); 48S / 24Q / 16D (2013-2024); 56S / 28Q / 24D (until 2012)
- Prize money: €2,950,310 (2026)
- Website: barcelonaopenbancsabadell.com

Current champions (2026)
- Singles: (France) Arthur Fils
- Doubles: (United Kingdom) Julian Cash (United Kingdom) Lloyd Glasspool

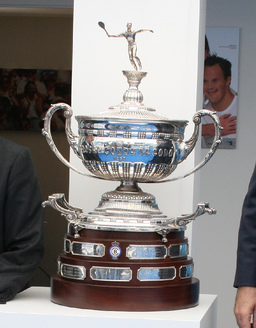
Trophy of the 2008 edition

The Barcelona Open is an annual professional ATP 500 men's tennis tournament on the ATP Tour that was founded in 1953. It is held at the Real Club de Tenis Barcelona in Barcelona, Spain, and played on outdoor clay courts. Since 2008 Banc Sabadell has been the title sponsor and the event has since been named Barcelona Open Banc Sabadell.

== History ==
The Barcelona Open was founded in 1953 as a combined men's and women's tournament until 1980. The tournament was created at the initiative of Carlos Godó Valls, 2nd Count of Godó, after the tennis club moved to its new location in Pedralbes, a neighborhood in Les Corts district of Barcelona, and is also known by its sponsored name the Barcelona Open Banco Sabadell - Trofeo Conde de Godó (English: Count of Godó Trophy). Vic Seixas won the first singles title as well as the doubles title, partnering Enrique Morea. It was an event of the Grand Prix tennis circuit from 1970 until 1989, except in 1971 when it was part of the World Championship Tennis (WCT) circuit, but also open to non-WCT players.

It is Spain's second most prestigious tournament on the ATP Tour after the Madrid Open and the event generally takes place in the last week of April, when temperatures in Barcelona average a daily high of 19 °C (66 °F).

Native Spaniard Rafael Nadal has won the singles title a record twelve times (2005, 2006, 2007, 2008, 2009, 2011, 2012, 2013, 2016, 2017, 2018, and 2021), and in 2017 the center court of the Real Club de Tenis Barcelona was renamed Pista Rafa Nadal (Rafa Nadal Arena).

== Past finals ==
=== Singles ===
Year	Champion	Runner-up	Score
1953	(United States) Vic Seixas	(Argentina) Enrique Morea	6–3, 6–4, 22–20
1954	(United States) Tony Trabert	(United States) Vic Seixas	6–0, 6–1, 6–3
1955	(United States) Art Larsen	(United States) Budge Patty	7–5, 3–6, 7–5, 2–6, 6–4
1956	(United States) Herbert Flam	(Australia) Bob Howe	6–2, 6–3, 6–0
1957	(United States) Herbert Flam (2)	(Australia) Mervyn Rose	6–4, 4–6, 6–3, 6–4
1958	(Sweden) Sven Davidson	(Australia) Mervyn Rose	4–6, 6–2, 7–5, 6–1
1959	(Australia) Neale Fraser	(Australia) Roy Emerson	6–2, 6–4, 3–6, 6–2
1960	(Spain) Andrés Gimeno	(Italy) Giuseppe Merlo	6–1, 6–2, 6–1
1961	(Australia) Roy Emerson	(Spain) Manuel Santana	6–4, 6–4, 6–1
1962	(Spain) Manuel Santana	(India) Ramanathan Krishnan	3–6, 6–3, 6–4, 8–6
1963	(Australia) Roy Emerson (2)	(Spain) Juan Manuel Couder	0–6, 6–4, 6–3, 4–6, 6–3
1964	(Australia) Roy Emerson (3)	(Spain) Manuel Santana	2–6, 7–5, 6–3, 6–3
1965	(Spain) Juan Gisbert	(Australia) Martin Mulligan	6–4, 4–6, 6–1, 2–6, 6–2
1966	(Brazil) Thomaz Koch	(Socialist Federal Republic of Yugoslavia) Nikola Pilić	6–3, 6–2, 3–6, 7–5
1967	(Australia) Martin Mulligan	(Mexico) Rafael Osuna	5–7, 7–5, 6–4, 6–3
1968	(Australia) Martin Mulligan (2)	(West Germany) Ingo Buding	6–0, 6–1, 6–0
↓ Open Era ↓
1969	(Spain) Manuel Orantes	(Spain) Manuel Santana	6–4, 7–5, 6–4
1970	(Spain) Manuel Santana (2)	(Australia) Rod Laver	6–4, 6–3, 6–4
1971	(Spain) Manuel Orantes (2)	(United States) Bob Lutz	6–4, 6–3, 6–4
↓ Grand Prix circuit ↓
1972	(Czechoslovakia) Jan Kodeš	(Spain) Manuel Orantes	6–3, 6–2, 6–3
1973	(Romania) Ilie Năstase	(Spain) Manuel Orantes	2–6, 6–1, 8–6, 6–4
1974	(Romania) Ilie Năstase (2)	(Spain) Manuel Orantes	8–6, 9–7, 6–3
1975	(Sweden) Björn Borg	(Italy) Adriano Panatta	1–6, 7–6^{(7–5)}, 6–3, 6–2
1976	(Spain) Manuel Orantes (3)	(United States) Eddie Dibbs	6–1, 2–6, 2–6, 7–5, 6–4
1977	(Sweden) Björn Borg (2)	(Spain) Manuel Orantes	6–2, 7–5, 6–2
1978	(Hungary) Balázs Taróczy	(Romania) Ilie Năstase	1–6, 7–5, 4–6, 6–3, 6–4
1979	(Chile) Hans Gildemeister	(United States) Eddie Dibbs	6–4, 6–3, 6–1
1980	(Czechoslovakia) Ivan Lendl	(Argentina) Guillermo Vilas	6–4, 5–7, 6–4, 4–6, 6–1
1981	(Czechoslovakia) Ivan Lendl (2)	(Argentina) Guillermo Vilas	6–0, 6–3, 6–0
1982	(Sweden) Mats Wilander	(Argentina) Guillermo Vilas	6–3, 6–4, 6–3
1983	(Sweden) Mats Wilander (2)	(Argentina) Guillermo Vilas	6–0, 6–3, 6–1
1984	(Sweden) Mats Wilander (3)	(Sweden) Joakim Nyström	7–6^{(7–5)}, 6–4, 0–6, 6–2
1985	(France) Thierry Tulasne	(Sweden) Mats Wilander	0–6, 6–2, 3–6, 6–4, 6–0
1986	(Sweden) Kent Carlsson	(West Germany) Andreas Maurer	6–2, 6–2, 6–0
1987	(Argentina) Martín Jaite	(Sweden) Mats Wilander	7–6^{(7–5)}, 6–4, 4–6, 0–6, 6–4
1988	(Sweden) Kent Carlsson (2)	(Austria) Thomas Muster	6–3, 6–3, 3–6, 6–1
1989	(Ecuador) Andrés Gómez	(Austria) Horst Skoff	6–4, 6–4, 6–2
↓ ATP Tour 500 (Note: Known as Championship Series from 1990 till 1999 and International Series Gold from 2000 till 2008.) ↓
1990	(Ecuador) Andrés Gómez (2)	(Argentina) Guillermo Pérez Roldán	6–0, 7–6^{(7–3)}, 3–6, 0–6, 6–2
1991	(Spain) Emilio Sánchez	(Spain) Sergi Bruguera	6–4, 7–6^{(9–7)}, 6–2
1992	(Spain) Carlos Costa	(Sweden) Magnus Gustafsson	6–4, 7–6^{(7–3)}, 6–4
1993	(Ukraine) Andrei Medvedev	(Spain) Sergi Bruguera	6–7^{(7–9)}, 6–3, 7–5, 6–4
1994	(Netherlands) Richard Krajicek	(Spain) Carlos Costa	6–4, 7–6^{(8–6)}, 6–2
1995	(Austria) Thomas Muster	(Sweden) Magnus Larsson	6–2, 6–1, 6–4
1996	(Austria) Thomas Muster (2)	(Chile) Marcelo Ríos	6–3, 4–6, 6–4, 6–1
1997	(Spain) Albert Costa	(Spain) Albert Portas	7–5, 6–4, 6–4
1998	(United States) Todd Martin	(Spain) Alberto Berasategui	6–2, 1–6, 6–3, 6–2
1999	(Spain) Félix Mantilla	(Morocco) Karim Alami	7–6^{(7–2)}, 6–3, 6–3
2000	(Russia) Marat Safin	(Spain) Juan Carlos Ferrero	6–3, 6–3, 6–4
2001	(Spain) Juan Carlos Ferrero	(Spain) Carlos Moyà	4–6, 7–5, 6–3, 3–6, 7–5
2002	(Argentina) Gastón Gaudio	(Spain) Albert Costa	6–4, 6–0, 6–2
2003	(Spain) Carlos Moyà	(Russia) Marat Safin	5–7, 6–2, 6–2, 3–0, ret.
2004	(Spain) Tommy Robredo	(Argentina) Gastón Gaudio	6–3, 4–6, 6–2, 3–6, 6–3
2005	(Spain) Rafael Nadal	(Spain) Juan Carlos Ferrero	6–1, 7–6^{(7–4)}, 6–3
2006	(Spain) Rafael Nadal (2)	(Spain) Tommy Robredo	6–4, 6–4, 6–0
2007	(Spain) Rafael Nadal (3)	(Argentina) Guillermo Cañas	6–3, 6–4
2008	(Spain) Rafael Nadal (4)	(Spain) David Ferrer	6–1, 4–6, 6–1
2009	(Spain) Rafael Nadal (5)	(Spain) David Ferrer	6–2, 7–5
2010	(Spain) Fernando Verdasco	(Sweden) Robin Söderling	6–3, 4–6, 6–3
2011	(Spain) Rafael Nadal (6)	(Spain) David Ferrer	6–2, 6–4
2012	(Spain) Rafael Nadal (7)	(Spain) David Ferrer	7–6^{(7–1)}, 7–5
2013	(Spain) Rafael Nadal (8)	(Spain) Nicolás Almagro	6–4, 6–3
2014	(Japan) Kei Nishikori	(Colombia) Santiago Giraldo	6–2, 6–2
2015	(Japan) Kei Nishikori (2)	(Spain) Pablo Andújar	6–4, 6–4
2016	(Spain) Rafael Nadal (9)	(Japan) Kei Nishikori	6–4, 7–5
2017	(Spain) Rafael Nadal (10)	(Austria) Dominic Thiem	6–4, 6–1
2018	(Spain) Rafael Nadal (11)	(Greece) Stefanos Tsitsipas	6–2, 6–1
2019	(Austria) Dominic Thiem	(Russia) Daniil Medvedev	6–4, 6–0
2020	Not held due to the COVID-19 pandemic		
2021	(Spain) Rafael Nadal (12)	(Greece) Stefanos Tsitsipas	6–4, 6–7^{(6–8)}, 7–5
2022	(Spain) Carlos Alcaraz	(Spain) Pablo Carreño Busta	6–3, 6–2
2023	(Spain) Carlos Alcaraz (2)	(Greece) Stefanos Tsitsipas	6–3, 6–4
2024	(Norway) Casper Ruud	(Greece) Stefanos Tsitsipas	7–5, 6–3
2025	(Denmark) Holger Rune	(Spain) Carlos Alcaraz	7–6^{(8–6)}, 6–2
2026	(France) Arthur Fils	Andrey Rublev	6–2, 7–6^{(7–2)}

=== Doubles ===
Year	Champions	Runners-up	Score
1953	(Argentina) Enrique Morea (United States) Vic Seixas	(Spain) Jaime Bartrolí (Sweden) Lennart Bergelin	6–3, 3–6, 6–3, 6–1
1954	(United States) Vic Seixas (2) (United States) Tony Trabert	(Australia) Jack Arkinstall (United States) Malcolm Fox	6–3, 6–4, 6–2
1955	(Australia) Mervyn Rose (Australia) George Worthington	(United States) Art Larsen (United States) Budge Patty	6–2, 2–6, 6–2, 6–1
1956	(Australia) Don Candy (Australia) Lew Hoad	(Australia) Bob Howe (United States) Art Larsen	6–1, 6–1, 6–2
1957	(Australia) Bob Howe (Australia) Mervyn Rose (2)	(United States) Herbert Flam (United States) Sidney Schwartz	6–3, 6–3, 5–7, 6–1
1958	(United Kingdom) Jaroslav Drobný (United States) Budge Patty	(Australia) Mervyn Rose (Australia) Warren Woodcock	7–5, 6–3, 6–2
1959	(Australia) Roy Emerson (Australia) Neale Fraser	(Chile) Luis Ayala (Australia) Rod Laver	6–2, 4–6, 6–4, 13–11
1960	(Australia) Roy Emerson (2) (Australia) Neale Fraser (2)	(Spain) José Luis Arilla (Spain) Andrés Gimeno	6–4, 6–0, 6–4
1961	(Australia) Bob Hewitt (Australia) Fred Stolle	(Australia) Bob Mark (Spain) Manuel Santana	2–6, 6–3, 6–4, 6–4
1962	(Australia) Roy Emerson (3) (Australia) Neale Fraser (3)	(Australia) Bob Hewitt (Australia) Fred Stolle	8–6, 8–6, 6–4
1963	(Australia) Roy Emerson (4) (Spain) Manuel Santana	(Spain) José Luis Arilla (Argentina) Eduardo Soriano	5–7, 6–2, 3–6, 7–5, 6–3
1964	(Australia) Roy Emerson (5) (Australia) Ken Fletcher	(Brazil) José Mandarino (Argentina) Eduardo Soriano	6–3, 8–6, 1–6, 5–7, 6–3
1965	(Australia) Roy Emerson (6) (India) Ramanathan Krishnan	(Spain) José Luis Arilla (Spain) Manuel Santana	6–2, 6–1, 6–1
1966	(Australia) Roy Emerson (7) (Australia) Fred Stolle (2)	(Brazil) Thomaz Koch (Brazil) José Mandarino	9–7, 6–4
1967	(Brazil) Thomaz Koch (Brazil) José Mandarino	(India) Ramanathan Krishnan (Mexico) Rafael Osuna	6–2, 6–4, 8–6
1968	(Brazil) Carlos Fernandes (Chile) Patricio Rodríguez	(Brazil) Thomaz Koch (Brazil) José Mandarino	6–2, 3–6, 6–3, 6–1, 6–4
↓ Open Era ↓
1969	(Spain) Manuel Orantes (Chile) Patricio Rodríguez	(Australia) Terry Addison (Australia) Ray Keldie	8–10, 6–3, 6–1, 5–7, 6–2
1970	(Australia) Lew Hoad (2) (Spain) Manuel Santana (2)	(Spain) Andrés Gimeno (Australia) Rod Laver	6–4, 9–7, 7–5
1971	(Socialist Federal Republic of Yugoslavia) Željko Franulović (Spain) Juan Gisbert	(South Africa) Cliff Drysdale (Spain) Andrés Gimeno	7–6, 6–2, 7–6
↓ Grand Prix circuit ↓
1972	(Spain) Juan Gisbert (2) (Spain) Manuel Orantes (2)	(South Africa) Frew McMillan (Romania) Ilie Năstase	6–3, 3–6, 6–4
1973	(Romania) Ilie Năstase (Netherlands) Tom Okker	(Spain) Antonio Muñoz (Spain) Manuel Orantes	4–6, 6–3, 6–2
1974	(Spain) Juan Gisbert (3) (Romania) Ilie Năstase (2)	(Spain) Manuel Orantes (Argentina) Guillermo Vilas	3–6, 6–0, 6–2
1975	(Sweden) Björn Borg (Argentina) Guillermo Vilas	(Poland) Wojciech Fibak (West Germany) Karl Meiler	3–6, 6–4, 6–3
1976	(United States) Brian Gottfried (Mexico) Raúl Ramírez	(South Africa) Bob Hewitt (South Africa) Frew McMillan	7–6, 6–4
1977	(Poland) Wojciech Fibak (Czechoslovakia) Jan Kodeš	(South Africa) Bob Hewitt (South Africa) Frew McMillan	6–0, 6–4
1978	(Socialist Federal Republic of Yugoslavia) Željko Franulović (Chile) Hans Gildemeister	(France) Jean-Louis Haillet (France) Gilles Moretton	6–1, 6–4
1979	(Italy) Paolo Bertolucci (Italy) Adriano Panatta	(Brazil) Carlos Kirmayr (Brazil) Cássio Motta	6–4, 6–3
1980	(United States) Steve Denton (Czechoslovakia) Ivan Lendl	(Czechoslovakia) Pavel Složil (Hungary) Balázs Taróczy	6–2, 6–7, 6–3
1981	(Sweden) Anders Järryd (Sweden) Hans Simonsson	(Ecuador) Andrés Gómez (Chile) Hans Gildemeister	6–1, 6–4
1982	(Sweden) Anders Järryd (2) (Sweden) Hans Simonsson (2)	(Brazil) Carlos Kirmayr (Brazil) Cássio Motta	6–3, 6–2
1983	(Sweden) Anders Järryd (3) (Sweden) Hans Simonsson (3)	(United States) Jim Gurfein (United States) Erick Iskersky	7–5, 6–3
1984	(Czechoslovakia) Pavel Složil (Czechoslovakia) Tomáš Šmíd	(Argentina) Martín Jaite (Paraguay) Víctor Pecci	6–2, 6–0
1985	(Spain) Sergio Casal (Spain) Emilio Sánchez	(Sweden) Jan Gunnarsson (Denmark) Michael Mortensen	6–3, 6–3
1986	(Sweden) Jan Gunnarsson (Sweden) Joakim Nyström	(Peru) Carlos di Laura (Italy) Claudio Panatta	6–3, 6–4
1987	(Czechoslovakia) Miloslav Mečíř (Czechoslovakia) Tomáš Šmíd (2)	(Argentina) Javier Frana (Argentina) Christian Miniussi	6–1, 6–2
1988	(Spain) Sergio Casal (2) (Spain) Emilio Sánchez (2)	(Switzerland) Claudio Mezzadri (Uruguay) Diego Pérez	6–4, 6–3
1989	(Argentina) Gustavo Luza (Argentina) Christian Miniussi	(Spain) Sergio Casal (Czechoslovakia) Tomáš Šmíd	6–3, 6–3
↓ ATP Tour 500 ↓
1990	(Ecuador) Andrés Gómez (Spain) Javier Sánchez	(Spain) Sergio Casal (Spain) Emilio Sánchez	7–6^{(7–1)}, 7–5
1991	(Argentina) Horacio de la Peña (Italy) Diego Nargiso	(Germany) Boris Becker (Germany) Eric Jelen	3–6, 7–6^{(7–2)}, 6–4
1992	(Ecuador) Andrés Gómez (2) (Spain) Javier Sánchez (2)	(United States) Ivan Lendl (Czechoslovakia) Karel Nováček	6–4, 6–4
1993	(United States) Shelby Cannon (United States) Scott Melville	(Spain) Sergio Casal (Spain) Emilio Sánchez	7–6^{(7–4)}, 6–1
1994	(Russia) Yevgeny Kafelnikov (Czech Republic) David Rikl	(United States) Jim Courier (Spain) Javier Sánchez	5–7, 6–1, 6–4
1995	(United States) Trevor Kronemann (United States) David Macpherson	(Italy) Andrea Gaudenzi (Croatia) Goran Ivanišević	6–2, 6–4
1996	(Argentina) Luis Lobo (Spain) Javier Sánchez (3)	(United Kingdom) Neil Broad (South Africa) Piet Norval	6–1, 6–3
1997	(Spain) Alberto Berasategui (Spain) Jordi Burillo	(Argentina) Pablo Albano (Spain) Àlex Corretja	6–3, 7–5
1998	(Netherlands) Jacco Eltingh (Netherlands) Paul Haarhuis	(South Africa) Ellis Ferreira (United States) Rick Leach	7–5, 6–0
1999	(Netherlands) Paul Haarhuis (2) (Russia) Yevgeny Kafelnikov (2)	(Italy) Massimo Bertolini (Italy) Cristian Brandi	7–5, 6–3
2000	(Sweden) Nicklas Kulti (Sweden) Mikael Tillström	(Netherlands) Paul Haarhuis (Australia) Sandon Stolle	6–2, 6–7^{(2–7)}, 7–6^{(7–5)}
2001	(United States) Donald Johnson (United States) Jared Palmer	(Spain) Tommy Robredo (Spain) Fernando Vicente	7–6^{(7–2)}, 6–4
2002	(Australia) Michael Hill (Czech Republic) Daniel Vacek	(Argentina) Lucas Arnold Ker (Argentina) Gastón Etlis	6–4, 6–4
2003	(United States) Bob Bryan (United States) Mike Bryan	(South Africa) Chris Haggard (South Africa) Robbie Koenig	6–4, 6–3
2004	(The Bahamas) Mark Knowles (Canada) Daniel Nestor	(Argentina) Mariano Hood (Argentina) Sebastián Prieto	4–6, 6–3, 6–4
2005	(India) Leander Paes (Serbia and Montenegro) Nenad Zimonjić	(Spain) Feliciano López (Spain) Rafael Nadal	6–3, 6–3
2006	(The Bahamas) Mark Knowles (2) (Canada) Daniel Nestor (2)	(Poland) Mariusz Fyrstenberg (Poland) Marcin Matkowski	6–2, 6–7^{(4–7)}, [10–5]
2007	(Romania) Andrei Pavel (West Germany) Alexander Waske	(Spain) Rafael Nadal (Spain) Tomeu Salvà	6–3, 7–6^{(7–1)}
2008	(United States) Bob Bryan (2) (United States) Mike Bryan (2)	(Poland) Mariusz Fyrstenberg (Poland) Marcin Matkowski	6–3, 6–2
2009	(Canada) Daniel Nestor (3) (Serbia) Nenad Zimonjić (2)	(India) Mahesh Bhupathi (The Bahamas) Mark Knowles	6–3, 7–6^{(11–9)}
2010	(Canada) Daniel Nestor (4) (Serbia) Nenad Zimonjić (3)	(Australia) Lleyton Hewitt (The Bahamas) Mark Knowles	4–6, 6–3, [10–6]
2011	(Mexico) Santiago González (United States) Scott Lipsky	(United States) Bob Bryan (United States) Mike Bryan	5–7, 6–2, [12–10]
2012	(Poland) Mariusz Fyrstenberg (Poland) Marcin Matkowski	(Spain) Marcel Granollers (Spain) Marc López	2–6, 7–6^{(9–7)}, [10–8]
2013	(Austria) Alexander Peya (Brazil) Bruno Soares	(Sweden) Robert Lindstedt (Canada) Daniel Nestor	5–7, 7–6^{(9–7)}, [10–4]
2014	(Netherlands) Jesse Huta Galung (France) Stéphane Robert	(Canada) Daniel Nestor (Serbia) Nenad Zimonjić	6–3, 6–3
2015	(Croatia) Marin Draganja (Finland) Henri Kontinen	(United Kingdom) Jamie Murray (Australia) John Peers	6–3, 6–7^{(6–8)}, [11–9]
2016	(United States) Bob Bryan (3) (United States) Mike Bryan (3)	(Uruguay) Pablo Cuevas (Spain) Marcel Granollers	7–5, 7–5
2017	(Romania) Florin Mergea (Pakistan) Aisam-ul-Haq Qureshi	(Germany) Philipp Petzschner (Austria) Alexander Peya	6–4, 6–3
2018	(Spain) Feliciano López (Spain) Marc López	(Pakistan) Aisam-ul-Haq Qureshi (Netherlands) Jean-Julien Rojer	7–6^{(7–5)}, 6–4
2019	(Colombia) Juan Sebastián Cabal (Colombia) Robert Farah	(United Kingdom) Jamie Murray (Brazil) Bruno Soares	6–4, 7–6^{(7–4)}
2020	Not held due to the COVID-19 pandemic		
2021	(Colombia) Juan Sebastián Cabal (2) (Colombia) Robert Farah (2)	(Germany) Kevin Krawietz (Romania) Horia Tecău	6–4, 6–2
2022	(Germany) Kevin Krawietz (Germany) Andreas Mies	(Netherlands) Wesley Koolhof (United Kingdom) Neal Skupski	6–7^{(3–7)}, 7–6^{(7–5)}, [10–6]
2023	(Argentina) Máximo González (Argentina) Andrés Molteni	(Netherlands) Wesley Koolhof (United Kingdom) Neal Skupski	6–3, 6–7^{(8–10)}, [10–4]
2024	(Argentina) Máximo González (2) (Argentina) Andrés Molteni (2)	(Poland) Jan Zieliński (Monaco) Hugo Nys	4–6, 6–4, [11–9]
2025	(Netherlands) Sander Arends (United Kingdom) Luke Johnson	(United Kingdom) Joe Salisbury (United Kingdom) Neal Skupski	6–3, 6–7^{(1–7)}, [10–6]
2026	(United Kingdom) Julian Cash (United Kingdom) Lloyd Glasspool	(France) Pierre-Hugues Herbert (Italy) Andrea Vavassori	6–3, 6–3

=== Seniors ===
Year	Champion	Runner-up	Third place	Fourth place
2006	(Spain) Sergi Bruguera; 6–1, 6–4	(Spain) Carlos Costa	(Netherlands) Richard Krajicek; 6–7^{(6–8)}, 6–4, [10–7]	(United States) John McEnroe
2007	(Spain) Sergi Bruguera; 4–6, 6–1, [10–2]	(Spain) Jordi Arrese	(France) Cédric Pioline; 6–2, 7–5	(United States) John McEnroe
2008	(Chile) Marcelo Ríos; 6–3, 6–3	(Germany) Michael Stich	(France) Cédric Pioline; 7–6^{(7–5)}, 3–1, ret.	(Spain) Albert Costa
2009	(Spain) Félix Mantilla; 6–4, 6–1	(Spain) Albert Costa	(Sweden) Magnus Gustafsson; 6–7^{(3–7)}, 6–2, [11–9]	(Sweden) Anders Järryd
2010	(Croatia) Goran Ivanišević; 6–4, 6–4	(Sweden) Thomas Enqvist	(Spain) Joan Balcells; 6–0, 6–3	(South Africa) Wayne Ferreira

== Prize money ==
The total prize money for the 2026 Barcelona Open Master 500 was €2,950,310. The package is divided as follows:

Event	W	F	SF	QF	Round of 16	Round of 32
Singles	€546,400	€291,450	€151,150	€78,950	€41,590	€22,770
Doubles	€191,260	€102,000	€51,600	€25,840	€13,380	—N/a

== Records and Statistics ==
=== Singles ===
Record Accomplished	No.	Player	Years
Titles won	12	Rafael Nadal	2005–09, 2011–13; 2016–18, 2021
Finals made	12	Rafael Nadal	2005–09, 2011–13; 2016–18, 2021
Matches played	72	Rafael Nadal	2005–21
Matches won	67	Rafael Nadal	2005–21
Match Win %	93.06%	Rafael Nadal	2005–21
Most editions played	22	Feliciano López	1998, 2001–12; 2014–19, 2021–23
Most finals made w/o winning a title	4	Guillermo Vilas	1980–83
Most finals made w/o winning a title	4	David Ferrer	2008-09, 2011-12
Most finals made w/o winning a title	4	Stefanos Tsitsipas	2018, 2021; 2023-24

=== Doubles ===
- Most doubles titles (player): (Australia) Roy Emerson: 7 (1959, 1960 and 1962 w/Fraser; 1963 w/Santana; 1964 w/Fletcher; 1965 w/Krishnan; and 1966 w/Stolle)
- Most doubles titles (teams): (Australia) Roy Emerson / Neale Fraser: 3 (1959, 1960 and 1962), (Sweden) Anders Järryd / Hans Simonsson: 3 (1981–1983), (United States) Bob Bryan / Mike Bryan: 3 (2003, 2008 and 2016)

=== Singles & doubles ===
Singles & doubles titles same year

- (Australia) Roy Emerson: 1963–64
- (Spain) Manuel Orantes: 1969–70
- (Romania) Ilie Năstase: 1973–74
- (United States) Vic Seixas: 1953
- (United States) Tony Trabert: 1954
- (Australia) Neale Fraser: 1959
- (Sweden) Björn Borg: 1975
- (Czechoslovakia) Ivan Lendl: 1980
- (Ecuador) Andrés Gómez: 1990

== Event names ==
=== Official (English) ===
- Count of Godó Trophy (1953-1967)
- Count of Godó Trophy & Spanish International Championships (1968-2007)
- Barcelona Open (2008-current)

=== Official (Spanish) ===
- Trofeo Conde de Godó (1953-1967)
- Trofeo Conde de Godó & Campeonatos Internacionales de España (1968-2007)

=== Sponsored ===
- Open Marlborough (1978-1984)
- No sponsor (1985-1986)
- Trofeo Winston Super Series (1987-1990)
- Trofeo Winston (1991-1992)
- Renault Open (1993-1995)
- Open Seat Godó (1996-2007)
- Open Sabadell Atlántico Barcelona (2008)
- Open Banco Sabadell (2009)
- Barcelona Open Banc Sabadell (2010-current)

== See also ==
- List of tennis tournaments
