= Real Club de Tenis Barcelona =

Tennis club in Barcelona, Spain

Real Club de Tenis Barcelona 1899
- Reial Club de Tennis Barcelona 1899
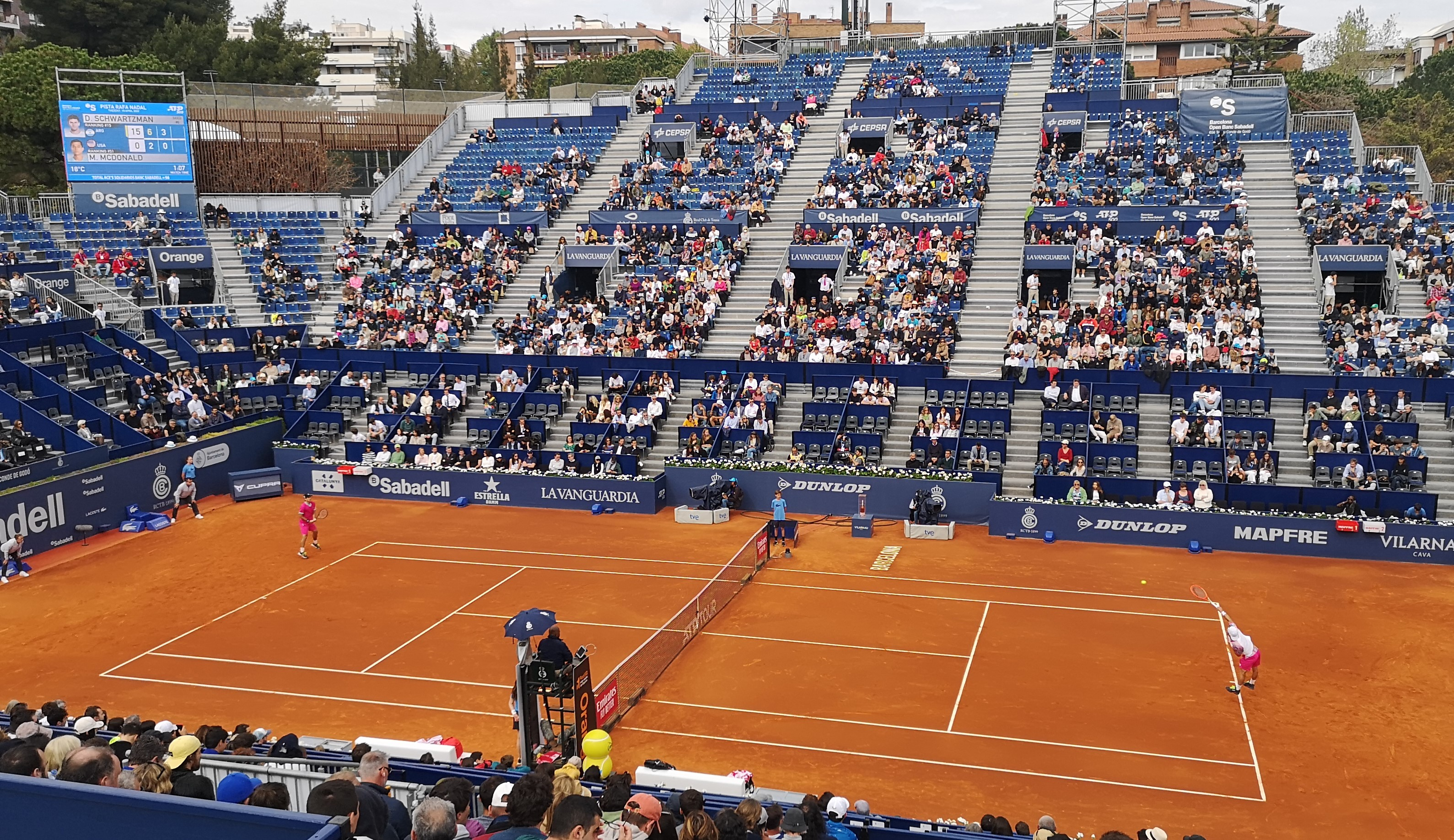
- Formation: 13 April 1899; 127 years ago
- Purpose: Sport
- Location: Barcelona, Spain
- Coordinates: 41.3928°N 2.1176°E
- Website: rctb1899.es

The Real Club de Tenis Barcelona 1899 (Catalan: Reial Club de Tennis Barcelona 1899) is a tennis club and training center in Barcelona, Catalonia, Spain. It is considered one of the most prestigious tennis clubs in the country.

The facility houses 18 clay courts, including a stadium court with a capacity of 8,400 and a show court for 2,000 spectators.

== History ==
The club was founded on 13 April 1899. Since moving to its current location in the northwest of the city in 1953, the club has hosted the Barcelona Open. Over the years, the club has hosted many Davis Cup ties of the Spanish team, including the Inter-Zonal final in 1965.

In 2017, the club's centre court was named after Rafael Nadal.

== Notable players ==
- José Luis Arilla
- Paula Badosa
- Marina Bassols Ribera
- Roberto Bautista Agut
- Aliona Bolsova
- Alberto Berasategui
- Albert Costa
- Fabio Fognini
- Gerard Granollers
- Marcel Granollers
- Karen Khachanov
- Feliciano López
- Conchita Martínez
- Rafael Nadal
- Albert Ramos Viñolas
- Tommy Robredo
- Andrey Rublev
- Arantxa Sánchez Vicario
- Emilio Sánchez
- Javier Sánchez
