= 2010 Mutua Madrileña Madrid Open – Men's doubles =

Men's doubles
- 2010 Mutua Madrileña Madrid Open

Final
- Champion: (United States) Bob Bryan (United States) Mike Bryan
- Runner-up: (Canada) Daniel Nestor (Serbia) Nenad Zimonjić
- Score: 6–3, 6–4

Events
| Singles | men | women |
| Doubles | men | women |
| ← 2009 · | Mutua Madrileña Madrid Open | · 2011 → |

Daniel Nestor and Nenad Zimonjić were the defending champions, but they lost in the final against Bob and Mike Bryan 3–6, 4–6.

== Seeds ==
All seeds receive a bye into the second round.

1. (Canada) Daniel Nestor / (Serbia) Nenad Zimonjić (final)
2. (United States) Bob Bryan / (United States) Mike Bryan (champions)
3. (Czech Republic) Lukáš Dlouhý / (India) Leander Paes (semifinals)
4. (South Africa) Wesley Moodie / (Belgium) Dick Norman (second round)
5. (Sweden) Simon Aspelin / (Australia) Paul Hanley (second round)
6. (Poland) Łukasz Kubot / (Austria) Oliver Marach (quarterfinals)
7. (Czech Republic) František Čermák / (Slovakia) Michal Mertiňák (second round)
8. (Poland) Mariusz Fyrstenberg / (Poland) Marcin Matkowski (quarterfinals)

== Draw ==
=== Key ===
- Q = Qualifier
- WC = Wild card
- LL = Lucky loser
- Alt = Alternate
- SE = Special exempt
- PR = Protected ranking
- ITF = ITF entry
- JE = Junior exempt
- w/o = Walkover
- r = Retired
- d = Defaulted
- SR = Special ranking

=== Finals ===
Semifinals

Final

1
- (Canada) Daniel Nestor
- (Serbia) Nenad Zimonjić
6
6

3
- (Czech Republic) Lukáš Dlouhý
- (India) Leander Paes
3
4

1
- (Canada) Daniel Nestor
- (Serbia) Nenad Zimonjić
3
4

2
- (United States) Bob Bryan
- (United States) Mike Bryan
6
6

- (Spain) Marcel Granollers
- (Serbia) Viktor Troicki
0
6
[2]

2
- (United States) Bob Bryan
- (United States) Mike Bryan
6
4
[10]

=== Top half ===
First round

Second round

Quarterfinals

Semifinals

1
- (Canada) D Nestor
- (Serbia) N Zimonjić
6
6

WC
- (Spain) Ó Hernández
- (Spain) D Marrero
6^{2}
4

- (Sweden) R Lindstedt
- (Romania) H Tecău
4
3

- (Sweden) R Lindstedt
- (Romania) H Tecău
7
6

1
- (Canada) D Nestor
- (Serbia) N Zimonjić
6
6

- (Brazil) T Bellucci
- (Brazil) B Soares
6
5
[8]

6
(Poland) Ł Kubot
(Austria) O Marach
3
4

- (United States) J Isner
- (United States) S Querrey
2
7
[10]

- (United States) J Isner
- (United States) S Querrey
0
6
[4]

6
(Poland) Ł Kubot
(Austria) O Marach
6
3
[10]

1
- (Canada) D Nestor
- (Serbia) N Zimonjić
6
6

3
- (Czech Republic) L Dlouhý
- (India) L Paes
3
4

3
- (Czech Republic) L Dlouhý
- (India) L Paes
6
6

- (Sweden) J Brunström
- (Netherlands Antilles) J-J Rojer
2
5

ALT
- (Argentina) JI Chela
- (Argentina) E Schwank
4
2

ALT
- (Argentina) JI Chela
- (Argentina) E Schwank
6
7

3
- (Czech Republic) L Dlouhý
- (India) L Paes
2
7
[10]

- (France) J Chardy
- (France) G Monfils
4
2

- (Spain) N Almagro
- (Spain) M López
6
5
[3]

- (Spain) N Almagro
- (Spain) M López
6
6

- (Spain) N Almagro
- (Spain) M López
7
3
[12]

7
- (Czech Republic) F Čermák
- (Slovakia) M Mertiňák
5
6
[10]

=== Bottom half ===
First round

Second round

Quarterfinals

Semifinals

5
- (Sweden) S Aspelin
- (Australia) P Hanley
6^{4}
7
[6]

ALT
- (Croatia) I Karlović
- (Serbia) D Vemić
4
4

- (Austria) J Knowle
- (Israel) A Ram
7
6^{5}
[10]

- (Austria) J Knowle
- (Israel) A Ram
6
6

- (Austria) J Knowle
- (Israel) A Ram
7
5
[8]

- (Austria) J Melzer
- (United States) A Roddick
2
6
[10]

- (Spain) M Granollers
- (Serbia) V Troicki
5
7
[10]

- (Spain) M Granollers
- (Serbia) V Troicki
6
3
[12]

- (Spain) M Granollers
- (Serbia) V Troicki
6
6^{4}
[14]

4
- (South Africa) W Moodie
- (Belgium) D Norman
3
7
[12]

- (Spain) M Granollers
- (Serbia) V Troicki
0
6
[2]

2
- (United States) B Bryan
- (United States) M Bryan
6
4
[10]

8
- (Poland) M Fyrstenberg
- (Poland) M Matkowski
5
6
[10]

WC
- (Spain) D Gimeno Traver
- (Spain) I Navarro
3
1

- (United States) M Fish
- (The Bahamas) M Knowles
7
4
[8]

- (United States) M Fish
- (The Bahamas) M Knowles
6
6

8
- (Poland) M Fyrstenberg
- (Poland) M Matkowski
3
4

- (Spain) F López
- (Spain) F Verdasco

2
(United States) B Bryan
(United States) M Bryan
6
6

ALT
- (Germany) B Becker
- (Switzerland) M Chiudinelli
w/o

ALT
- (Germany) B Becker
- (Switzerland) M Chiudinelli
1
6^{4}

2
- (United States) B Bryan
- (United States) M Bryan
6
7
