= 2004 Mutua Madrileña Masters Madrid – Doubles =

Doubles
- 2004 Mutua Madrileña Masters Madrid

Final
- Champions: (The Bahamas) Mark Knowles (Canada) Daniel Nestor
- Runners-up: (United States) Bob Bryan (United States) Mike Bryan
- Score: 6–3, 6–4

Events
Singles	Doubles
- Mutua Madrileña Masters Madrid

Mahesh Bhupathi and Max Mirnyi were the defending champions, but lost in semifinals to Mark Knowles and Daniel Nestor.

Mark Knowles and Daniel Nestor won the title, defeating Bob and Mike Bryan 6–3, 6–4 in the final. It was the 35th doubles title for Knowles and the 37th doubles title for Nestor, in their respective careers. It was also the 5th and final title of the year for the pair.

== Seeds ==
1. (The Bahamas) Mark Knowles / (Canada) Daniel Nestor (champions)
2. (United States) Bob Bryan / (United States) Mike Bryan (final)
3. (India) Mahesh Bhupathi / (Belarus) Max Mirnyi (semifinal)
4. (Zimbabwe) ~~Wayne Black~~ / (Zimbabwe) ~~Kevin Ullyett~~ (withdrew)

== Draw ==
Key

- Q = Qualifier
- WC = Wild card
- LL = Lucky loser
- Alt = Alternate
- ITF = ITF entry
- PR = Protected ranking
- SR = Special ranking
- SE = Special exempt
- JE = Junior exempt
- JR = Junior Accelerator Programme entrant
- CO = College Accelerator Programme entrant
- NG = Next Gen Accelerator Program entrant
- w/o = Walkover
- r = Retired
- d = Defaulted

=== Draw ===
First round
1	(The Bahamas) M Knowles (Canada) D Nestor	6^{4}	6	6
(Austria) J Knowle (Serbia and Montenegro) N Zimonjić	7^{7}	2	2
(Chile) F González (Chile) N Massú	5	0^{r}
(Argentina) G Etlis (Argentina) M Rodríguez	7	0
3	(India) M Bhupathi (Belarus) M Mirnyi	6	7^{7}
(India) L Paes (Czech Republic) D Rikl	4	6^{4}
(Slovakia) D Hrbatý (Germany) R Schüttler	6	4
WC	(Spain) R Nadal (Spain) T Robredo	4	1^{r}
(Australia) W Arthurs (Australia) P Hanley	6	6
(Argentina) G Cañas (Germany) T Haas	3	3
(United States) J Palmer (Czech Republic) P Vízner	6^{3}	4
Alt	(Czech Republic) M Damm (Czech Republic) C Suk	7^{7}	6
(Sweden) J Björkman (Israel) J Erlich	6^{6}	6^{2}
(Argentina) JI Chela (Romania) A Pavel	7^{8}	7^{7}
WC	(Israel) A Ram (Russia) M Safin	2	4
2	(United States) B Bryan (United States) M Bryan	6	6

Quarterfinals
1	(The Bahamas) M Knowles (Canada) D Nestor	6	3	6
(Argentina) G Etlis (Argentina) M Rodríguez	3	6	3
3	(India) M Bhupathi (Belarus) M Mirnyi	6	6
(Slovakia) D Hrbatý (Germany) R Schüttler	4	2
(Australia) W Arthurs (Australia) P Hanley	6^{7}	7^{7}	2
Alt	(Czech Republic) M Damm (Czech Republic) C Suk	7^{9}	6^{4}	6
(Argentina) JI Chela (Romania) A Pavel	4	4
2	(United States) B Bryan (United States) M Bryan	6	6

Semifinals
1	(The Bahamas) M Knowles (Canada) D Nestor	6	7^{7}
3	(India) M Bhupathi (Belarus) M Mirnyi	4	6^{3}
Alt	(Czech Republic) M Damm (Czech Republic) C Suk	6^{5}	5
2	(United States) B Bryan (United States) M Bryan	7^{7}	7

Final
1	(The Bahamas) M Knowles (Canada) D Nestor	6	6
2	(United States) B Bryan (United States) M Bryan	3	4
