= 2009 Mutua Madrileña Madrid Open – Men's doubles =

Men's doubles
- 2009 Mutua Madrileña Madrid Open

Final
- Champions: (Canada) Daniel Nestor (Serbia) Nenad Zimonjić
- Runners-up: (Sweden) Simon Aspelin (South Africa) Wesley Moodie
- Score: 6–4, 6–4

Events
Singles	men	women
Doubles	men	women
← 2008 ·	Mutua Madrileña Madrid Open	· 2010 →

Mariusz Fyrstenberg and Marcin Matkowski were the defending champions, but lost in the second round to Juan Martín del Potro and Mardy Fish.

== Seeds ==
All seeds receive a bye into the second round.

1. (United States) Bob Bryan / (United States) Mike Bryan (second round)
2. (Canada) Daniel Nestor / (Serbia) Nenad Zimonjić (champions)
3. (Czech Republic) Lukáš Dlouhý / (India) Leander Paes (withdrew due to a sickness for Dlouhy)
4. (India) Mahesh Bhupathi / (The Bahamas) Mark Knowles (second round)
5. (Brazil) Bruno Soares / (Zimbabwe) Kevin Ullyett (semifinals)
6. (Poland) Mariusz Fyrstenberg / (Poland) Marcin Matkowski (second round)
7. (Belarus) Max Mirnyi / (Israel) Andy Ram (second round)
8. (Brazil) Marcelo Melo / (Brazil) André Sá (second round)

== Draw ==
=== Key ===
- Q = Qualifier
- WC = Wild card
- LL = Lucky loser
- Alt = Alternate
- SE = Special exempt
- PR = Protected ranking
- ITF = ITF entry
- JE = Junior exempt
- w/o = Walkover
- r = Retired
- d = Defaulted
- SR = Special ranking

=== Finals ===
Semifinals
(Sweden) Simon Aspelin (South Africa) Wesley Moodie	3	7	[10]
5	(Brazil) Bruno Soares (Zimbabwe) Kevin Ullyett	6	6^{3}	[6]
(Argentina) Juan Martín del Potro (United States) Mardy Fish	4	3
2	(Canada) Daniel Nestor (Serbia) Nenad Zimonjić	6	6

Final
(Sweden) Simon Aspelin (South Africa) Wesley Moodie	4	4
2	(Canada) Daniel Nestor (Serbia) Nenad Zimonjić	6	6

=== Top half ===
First round
ALT	(Argentina) M González (Argentina) J Mónaco	4	5
(Sweden) S Aspelin (South Africa) W Moodie	6	7
(Serbia) N Djokovic (Serbia) D Vemić	7	6
(South Africa) J Coetzee (Australia) J Kerr	6^{4}	3
(Czech Republic) F Čermák (Slovakia) M Mertiňák	6	7
(Austria) J Knowle (Austria) J Melzer	2	5
(Australia) A Fisher (United States) T Parrott	4	6	[14]
(Italy) S Bolelli (Italy) A Seppi	6	3	[12]

Second round
1	(United States) B Bryan (United States) M Bryan	7	1	[9]
(Sweden) S Aspelin (South Africa) W Moodie	6^{4}	6	[11]
(Serbia) N Djokovic (Serbia) D Vemić	6	7
8	(Brazil) M Melo (Brazil) A Sá	2	6^{9}
ALT	(Spain) Ó Hernández (Spain) A Montañés	3	2
(Czech Republic) F Čermák (Slovakia) M Mertiňák	6	6
(Australia) A Fisher (United States) T Parrott	5	6	[10]
5	(Brazil) B Soares (Zimbabwe) K Ullyett	7	4	[12]

Quarterfinals
(Sweden) S Aspelin (South Africa) W Moodie	4	6	[11]
(Serbia) N Djokovic (Serbia) D Vemić	6	3	[9]
(Czech Republic) F Čermák (Slovakia) M Mertiňák	5	2
5	(Brazil) B Soares (Zimbabwe) K Ullyett	7	6

Semifinals
(Sweden) S Aspelin (South Africa) W Moodie	3	7	[10]
5	(Brazil) B Soares (Zimbabwe) K Ullyett	6	6^{3}	[6]

=== Bottom half ===
First round
(Spain) N Almagro (Spain) D Ferrer	2	3
(Argentina) JM del Potro (United States) M Fish	6	6
WC	(Spain) P Andújar (Spain) G García López	6	5	[7]
(Australia) S Huss (United Kingdom) R Hutchins	4	7	[10]
(Spain) M Granollers (Spain) T Robredo	7	6
(Spain) F López (Spain) F Verdasco	6^{3}	1
WC	(Spain) M López (Spain) R Ramírez Hidalgo	7	1	[11]
(Germany) C Kas (Netherlands) R Wassen	6^{4}	6	[9]

Second round
6	(Poland) M Fyrstenberg (Poland) M Matkowski	3	4
(Argentina) JM del Potro (United States) M Fish	6	6
(Australia) S Huss (United Kingdom) R Hutchins	6	7
4	(India) M Bhupathi (The Bahamas) M Knowles	4	5
7	(Belarus) M Mirnyi (Israel) A Ram	7	2	[12]
(Spain) M Granollers (Spain) T Robredo	5	6	[14]
WC	(Spain) M López (Spain) R Ramírez Hidalgo	3	7	[6]
2	(Canada) D Nestor (Serbia) N Zimonjić	6	6^{7}	[10]

Quarterfinals
(Argentina) JM del Potro (United States) M Fish	6^{9}	6	[10]
(Australia) S Huss (United Kingdom) R Hutchins	7	2	[4]
(Spain) M Granollers (Spain) T Robredo	6	3	[8]
2	(Canada) D Nestor (Serbia) N Zimonjić	4	6	[10]

Semifinals
(Argentina) JM del Potro (United States) M Fish	4	3
2	(Canada) D Nestor (Serbia) N Zimonjić	6	6
