= 1995 Thriftway ATP Championships =

- Date: August 7–14
- Edition: 94th
- Category: Championship Series, Single Week
- Draw: 56S / 28D
- Prize money: $1,795,000
- Surface: Hard / outdoor
- Location: Mason, Ohio, U.S.
- Venue: Lindner Family Tennis Center

Champions

Singles
- (United States) Andre Agassi

Doubles
- (Australia) Todd Woodbridge / (Australia) Mark Woodforde
- Cincinnati Masters

The 1995 Cincinnati Open, known by the corporate title of the Thriftway ATP Championships was a men's tennis tournament played on outdoor hard courts that was part of the Championship Series of the 1995 ATP Tour. It took place in Mason, Ohio, United States, from August 7 through August 14, 1995. First-seeded Andre Agassi won the singles title.

== Finals ==
=== Singles ===
(United States) Andre Agassi defeated (United States) Michael Chang 7–5, 6–2

- It was Andre Agassi's 6th title of the year and his 30th overall. It was his 3rd Masters title of the year and his 7th overall.

=== Doubles ===
(Australia) Todd Woodbridge / (Australia) Mark Woodforde defeated (The Bahamas) Mark Knowles / (Canada) Daniel Nestor 6–2, 3–0 ret.
