= Daniel Nestor =

Canadian tennis player (born 1972)

Daniel Nestor CM
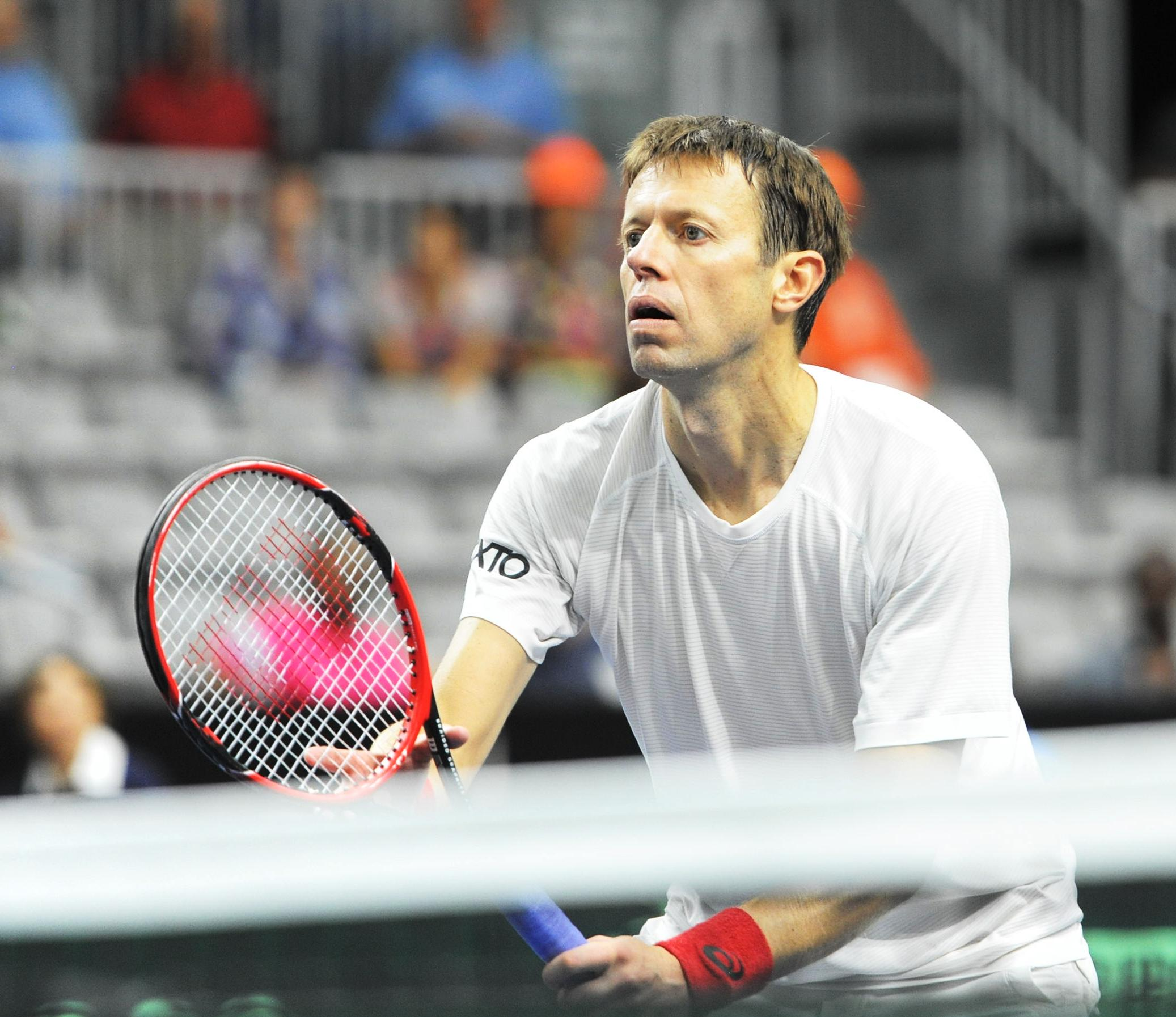
- Nestor at the Canada vs. The Netherlands Davis Cup (Sep 2018)
- Native name: Данијел Несторовић; Danijel Nestorović
- Country (sports): Canada
- Residence: Toronto, Ontario, Canada
- Born: September 4, 1972 (age 53) Belgrade, SR Serbia, SFR Yugoslavia
- Height: 1.91 m (6 ft 3 in)
- Turned pro: 1991
- Retired: 2018
- Plays: Left-handed (two-handed backhand)
- Prize money: US$12,835,671

Singles
- Career record: 85–118
- Career titles: 0
- Highest ranking: No. 58 (August 23, 1999)

Grand Slam singles results
- Australian Open: 3R (1998, 1999, 2001)
- French Open: 1R (1997, 1998, 1999)
- Wimbledon: 4R (1999)
- US Open: 2R (1995, 2000)

Other tournaments
- Olympic Games: 3R (2000)

Doubles
- Career record: 1062–488
- Career titles: 91 (3rd in the Open Era)
- Highest ranking: No. 1 (August 19, 2002)

Grand Slam doubles results
- Australian Open: W (2002)
- French Open: W (2007, 2010, 2011, 2012)
- Wimbledon: W (2008, 2009)
- US Open: W (2004)

Other doubles tournaments
- Tour Finals: W (2007, 2008, 2010, 2011)
- Olympic Games: W (2000)

Mixed doubles
- Career titles: 4

Grand Slam mixed doubles results
- Australian Open: W (2007, 2011, 2014)
- French Open: F (2006, 2013)
- Wimbledon: W (2013)
- US Open: F (2003)

Team competitions
- Davis Cup: SF (2013)
Medal record
Representing Canada
Men's tennis
Olympic Games
| Gold medal – first place | 2000 Sydney | Doubles |

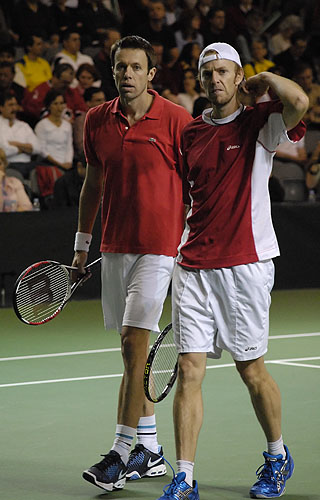
Nestor next to countryman Fred Niemeyer (right), his Davis Cup and Olympics partner from 2002 through 2009.

Daniel Mark Nestor CM (/ˈnɛstər/ NES-tər; Serbian: Данијел Нестор, romanized: Danijel Nestor; born Danijel Nestorović, September 4, 1972) is a Canadian former professional tennis player. He was ranked as the world No. 1 in men's doubles by the Association of Tennis Professionals (ATP) for 108 weeks (fifth-most of all time). Nestor won 95 ATP Tour-level doubles titles, including twelve majors (eight in men's doubles and four in mixed doubles), an Olympic gold medal at the 2000 Sydney Olympics, and four Tour Finals. Nestor was the first man to complete the Big Titles sweep in doubles (winning every major and Masters event, the Tour Finals, and an Olympic gold medal over the course of a career), an achievement only matched by the Bryan brothers. He was part of the ATP Doubles Team of the Year in 2002 and 2004 (with Mark Knowles), and 2008 (with Nenad Zimonjić).

Nestor is widely considered one of the foremost doubles players in history, due to his longevity and continued success at the top of the game. As of March 2018, he is 10th for the most ATP Tour titles in Open Era history, and has the third-highest tally for doubles titles. In January 2016, Nestor became the first doubles player in ATP history to win 1000 matches. He was continuously ranked in the top 100 in doubles from April 1994 to April 2018, a total of 1134 consecutive weeks. Nestor retired at the end of the 2018 season, ending a 27-year career.

== Tennis career ==
Nestor won his first doubles title in Bogotá, Colombia with Mark Knowles in 1994. They defeated French Open champions Luke and Murphy Jensen in the final.

He was a member of the Canadian Davis Cup team from 1992 to 2018. He first came to prominence in the public eye that year by defeating then world number one Stefan Edberg in a hard-fought singles match in Vancouver. He was part of the squad who made history for Canada in 2013 as they were the first Canadian team in the Open Era to reach the World Group semifinals.

At the 2000 Summer Olympics in Sydney, Australia, Nestor and partner Sébastien Lareau won a gold medal, the first medal in tennis for Canada. The duo won four more titles together during their career, which was highlighted by an ATP Masters 1000 win in Canada. After the Olympics, Nestor won one title with Kevin Ullyett in November 2000 and two with Sandon Stolle in 2001.

On July 5, 2006, he participated in the second-longest match in Wimbledon history, lasting 6 hours and 9 minutes.

Nestor won three Grand Slam doubles titles together with longtime partner Mark Knowles of the Bahamas. The tandem won the 2002 Australian Open, the 2004 US Open and the 2007 French Open. He and Knowles also reached the final of the 1995 Australian Open, the 1998 French Open and US Open, the 2002 French Open and Wimbledon and the 2003 Australian Open.

In mixed doubles, he reached his first final at the 2003 US Open with Lina Krasnoroutskaya. He made it to the 2006 Australian Open and 2006 French Open finals, as well as winning the mixed doubles event at the 2007 Australian Open with partner Elena Likhovtseva.

2007 was a year of change for Nestor. He and long-time doubles partner Knowles announced that they were parting ways after the 2007 US Open (the two won 40 titles together, including 3 Grand Slams, 1 ATP year-end finals, and 15 ATP Masters 1000 titles), as Nestor began a new partnership with Nenad Zimonjić. Nestor and Zimonjić had actually won an ATP World Tour 250 Series event together back in 2001. They won the first title of their official partnership at the 2007 St. Petersburg Open, then advanced to the 2007 Paris Masters final as the second seeds, where they lost to No. 1 doubles team Bob and Mike Bryan. Nestor and Knowles partnered once more at the 2007 Tennis Masters Cup after having qualified for the year-end event as the top seed. Their finals win over Simon Aspelin and Julian Knowle earned them their first Tennis Masters Cup title at the year-end doubles tournament, and was a fitting end for one of the most successful doubles teams to ever play the game.

Nestor had chosen to partner with Zimonjić because he felt as though the game had transformed into a more powerful and physical version of doubles. The New York Times reported that "on the tour, it's known that they (Nestor and Zimonjić) joined up, after years in the top 5 with other partners, specifically to usurp the Bryans." In 2008 (their first full season), Nestor and Zimonjić won the first major title of their partnership at the Hamburg Masters. They reached the final of the French Open a week later. Nestor and Zimonjić then captured the 2008 Wimbledon title, winning over Jonas Björkman and Kevin Ullyett. This was Nestor's first Wimbledon title, and in doing so, he completed a Career Grand/Golden Slam. The pair also captured the 2008 Tennis Masters Cup that year.

In 2009, the pair won Wimbledon again and eight additional titles, five of which were Masters 1000 events – personal bests for both in terms of numbers of Masters 1000 and overall titles won in a single year. In 2010, Nestor and Zimonjić won the French Open and were runners-up at the Australian Open. In October 2010, the duo announced that they would split up at the end of the 2010 season. However, they too, finished their partnership on a high note by winning the ATP World Tour Finals in London. Between 2008 and 2010, the duo won 21 ATP titles and reached 9 more finals. The pair won 27 titles together, which includes 3 Grand Slams, 2 ATP year-end finals, and 10 ATP Masters 1000 titles.

Nestor paired up with Max Mirnyi from 2011 to 2012. In his first tournament with Max Mirnyi in Brisbane, he won his 783rd career doubles match, overtaking Todd Woodbridge for the all-time match wins record. Nestor and Mirnyi won the 2011 French Open and the 2011 ATP World Tour Finals in London. In the final of the ATP World Tour Finals, he played his 1,148th match, an all-time record. Nestor won one more Grand Slam title with Mirnyi when they captured their second straight French Open in 2012. Nestor won a total of eight titles during his partnership with Mirnyi, which includes the 2 Grand Slams, 1 ATP year-end finals, and 1 ATP Masters 1000 title in Shanghai. Nestor won his second mixed doubles title at the 2011 Australian Open with Katarina Srebotnik.

Starting in January 2013, Nestor decided to partner with Mahesh Bhupathi. He however changed to play with Robert Lindstedt later during that year. In July, he won the 2013 Wimbledon mixed doubles title with Kristina Mladenovic and they also reached the 2013 French Open mixed doubles finals together. Nestor won his 81st doubles title, the Winston-Salem Open, in August with new partner Leander Paes. He also became the first player in ATP history to score 900 career doubles wins. With only one doubles title in 2013, it was the first year since 1999 in which Nestor failed to win four or more men's doubles titles, and the first year since 1995 in which Nestor failed to win two or more men's doubles titles. During the difficult year, he dropped out of the top 5 ATP rankings in June for the first time in 6 years, and ended the year 25th overall, his lowest doubles ranking since June 2000.

At the first tournament of his season, the 2014 Brisbane International, Nestor partnered with Mariusz Fyrstenberg and won his 82nd doubles title. Frysenberg was the 8th partner of Nestor's career with which he won a doubles title. However, at the end of 2013, he had decided to team with former partner Nenad Zimonjić for the 2014 season, and the next week at the 2014 Apia International Sydney, Zimonjić helped Nestor capture his second doubles title in as many weeks. Nestor captured his third Australian Open mixed doubles title, his second Grand Slam title with Mladenovic. He won his third doubles title of the season and 84th of his career at the 2014 Mutua Madrid Open, surpassing Todd Woodbridge for 3rd overall in ATP history. His first ATP Masters 1000 title since Shanghai in 2011 also brought his ATP ranking up to 7th overall, pushing him back in the top 10 for the first time in nearly a year. The next week, Nestor and Zimonjić won their second consecutive Masters 1000 title at the 2014 Internazionali BNL d'Italia, making 2014 the first year since 2009 that Nestor won multiple Masters 1000 titles. Despite a disappointing finish at the US Open, Nestor rose to number 3 overall and he and Zimonjic clinched a spot in the ATP Tour finals following the tournament.

In January 2015 at the Apia International Sydney, Nestor won his 86th doubles title, putting him in sole position of 11th overall for ATP titles in the Open era. This was Nestor's first title with new partner Rohan Bopanna, his 9th different partner. The same month, Nestor reached the mixed doubles final with Kristina Mladenovic at the Australian Open. He won his second doubles title of the season at the Dubai Tennis Championships in February. In August at the Cincinnati Masters, Nestor won his third title of the season and his first with new partner Édouard Roger-Vasselin.

In January 2016, Nestor and Radek Štěpánek became the oldest team to reach a Grand Slam men's doubles final at the Australian Open, losing in three sets to Jamie Murray and Bruno Soares. In June at the Aegon Open Nottingham, Nestor won his first title of the season with his 11th different partner Dominic Inglot, making it 23 consecutive years with at least one men's doubles title. He won his second doubles title in July at the Citi Open with Roger-Vasselin. While partnering again with Roger-Vasselin at the European Open in October, Nestor won his third title of the season and 91st overall.

On June 20, 2018, Nestor announced that he would retire in September 2018 after 28 career years. At the age of 46, he played his last professional match on September 15 at the Davis Cup World Group play-offs home tie against the Netherlands in Toronto partnering Vasek Pospisil, losing 6–4, 3–6, 4–6, 4–6 to Matwé Middelkoop and Jean-Julien Rojer.

== Personal life ==
Born Danijel Nestorović, his Serbian parents moved to Canada short of his fourth birthday in 1976 and settled in Toronto, where he attended Elkhorn Public School and then Earl Haig Secondary School for a special sports program, known as APGA (Academic Program for Gifted Athletes).

In July 2005, Nestor married Natasha Gavrilovic, his girlfriend of two years. They welcomed their first daughter, Tiana Alexis, on December 15, 2008, only two weeks after his doubles partner Zimonjić and his wife had twins. Their second daughter, Bianca Willow, was born on March 2, 2013. The couple now resides in the Bahamas with their two children.

Nestor was appointed a Member of the Order of Canada (CM) in November 2010. On June 28, 2011, it was announced that Nestor would receive a star on Canada's Walk of Fame and was inducted on October 1 at Elgin Theatre in Toronto. He was awarded an honorary doctorate by York University in August 2012. Nestor was awarded the Order of Sport and inducted into Canada's Sports Hall of Fame in 2024.

== Grand Slam finals ==
=== Doubles: 17 (8 titles, 9 runners-up) ===
| Result | Year | Championship | Surface | Partner | Opponents | Score |
|---|---|---|---|---|---|---|
| Loss | 1995 | Australian Open | Hard | (The Bahamas) Mark Knowles | (United States) Jared Palmer (United States) Richey Reneberg | 3–6, 6–3, 3–6, 2–6 |
| Loss | 1998 | French Open | Clay | (The Bahamas) Mark Knowles | (Netherlands) Jacco Eltingh (Netherlands) Paul Haarhuis | 3–6, 6–3, 3–6 |
| Loss | 1998 | US Open | Hard | (The Bahamas) Mark Knowles | (Australia) Sandon Stolle (Czech Republic) Cyril Suk | 6–4, 6–7, 2–6 |
| Win | 2002 | Australian Open (1) | Hard | (The Bahamas) Mark Knowles | (France) Michaël Llodra (France) Fabrice Santoro | 7–6^{(7–4)}, 6–3 |
| Loss | 2002 | French Open | Clay | (The Bahamas) Mark Knowles | (Netherlands) Paul Haarhuis (Russia) Yevgeny Kafelnikov | 5–7, 4–6 |
| Loss | 2002 | Wimbledon | Grass | (The Bahamas) Mark Knowles | (Sweden) Jonas Björkman (Australia) Todd Woodbridge | 1–6, 2–6, 7–6^{(8–6)}, 5–7 |
| Loss | 2003 | Australian Open | Hard | (The Bahamas) Mark Knowles | (France) Michaël Llodra (France) Fabrice Santoro | 4–6, 6–3, 3–6 |
| Win | 2004 | US Open (1) | Hard | (The Bahamas) Mark Knowles | (India) Leander Paes (Czech Republic) David Rikl | 6–3, 6–3 |
| Win | 2007 | French Open (1) | Clay | (The Bahamas) Mark Knowles | (Czech Republic) Lukáš Dlouhý (Czech Republic) Pavel Vízner | 2–6, 6–3, 6–2 |
| Loss | 2008 | French Open | Clay | (Serbia) Nenad Zimonjić | (Uruguay) Pablo Cuevas (Peru) Luis Horna | 2–6, 3–6 |
| Win | 2008 | Wimbledon (1) | Grass | (Serbia) Nenad Zimonjić | (Sweden) Jonas Björkman (Zimbabwe) Kevin Ullyett | 7–6^{(14–12)}, 6–7^{(3–7)}, 6–3, 6–3 |
| Win | 2009 | Wimbledon (2) | Grass | (Serbia) Nenad Zimonjić | (United States) Bob Bryan (United States) Mike Bryan | 7–6^{(9–7)}, 6–7^{(3–7)}, 7–6^{(7–3)}, 6–3 |
| Loss | 2010 | Australian Open | Hard | (Serbia) Nenad Zimonjić | (United States) Bob Bryan (United States) Mike Bryan | 3–6, 7–6^{(7–5)}, 3–6 |
| Win | 2010 | French Open (2) | Clay | (Serbia) Nenad Zimonjić | (Czech Republic) Lukáš Dlouhý (India) Leander Paes | 7–5, 6–2 |
| Win | 2011 | French Open (3) | Clay | (Belarus) Max Mirnyi | (Colombia) Juan Sebastián Cabal (Argentina) Eduardo Schwank | 7–6^{(7–3)}, 3–6, 6–4 |
| Win | 2012 | French Open (4) | Clay | (Belarus) Max Mirnyi | (United States) Bob Bryan (United States) Mike Bryan | 6–4, 6–4 |
| Loss | 2016 | Australian Open | Hard | (Czech Republic) Radek Štěpánek | (United Kingdom) Jamie Murray (Brazil) Bruno Soares | 6–2, 4–6, 5–7 |

=== Mixed doubles: 9 (4 titles, 5 runners-up) ===
| Result | Year | Championship | Surface | Partner | Opponents | Score |
|---|---|---|---|---|---|---|
| Loss | 2003 | US Open | Hard | (Russia) Lina Krasnoroutskaya | (Slovenia) Katarina Srebotnik (United States) Bob Bryan | 7–5, 5–7, [5–10] |
| Loss | 2006 | Australian Open | Hard | (Russia) Elena Likhovtseva | (Switzerland) Martina Hingis (India) Mahesh Bhupathi | 3–6, 3–6 |
| Loss | 2006 | French Open | Clay | (Russia) Elena Likhovtseva | (Slovenia) Katarina Srebotnik (Serbia and Montenegro) Nenad Zimonjić | 3–6, 4–6 |
| Win | 2007 | Australian Open (1) | Hard | (Russia) Elena Likhovtseva | (Belarus) Victoria Azarenka (Belarus) Max Mirnyi | 6–4, 6–4 |
| Win | 2011 | Australian Open (2) | Hard | (Slovenia) Katarina Srebotnik | (Chinese Taipei) Yung-Jan Chan (Australia) Paul Hanley | 6–3, 3–6, [10–7] |
| Loss | 2013 | French Open | Clay | (France) Kristina Mladenovic | (Czech Republic) Lucie Hradecká (Czech Republic) František Čermák | 6–1, 4–6, [6–10] |
| Win | 2013 | Wimbledon (1) | Grass | (France) Kristina Mladenovic | (United States) Lisa Raymond (Brazil) Bruno Soares | 5–7, 6–2, 8–6 |
| Win | 2014 | Australian Open (3) | Hard | (France) Kristina Mladenovic | (India) Sania Mirza (Romania) Horia Tecău | 6–3, 6–2 |
| Loss | 2015 | Australian Open | Hard | (France) Kristina Mladenovic | (Switzerland) Martina Hingis (India) Leander Paes | 4–6, 3–6 |

== Other significant finals ==
=== Year–End Championship finals ===
==== Doubles: 6 (4 titles, 2 runners-up) ====
| Result | Year | Championship | Surface | Partner | Opponents | Score |
|---|---|---|---|---|---|---|
| Loss | 1998 | Hartford | Carpet (i) | (The Bahamas) Mark Knowles | (Netherlands) Jacco Eltingh (Netherlands) Paul Haarhuis | 4–6, 2–6, 5–7 |
| Loss | 2006 | Shanghai | Hard (i) | (The Bahamas) Mark Knowles | (Sweden) Jonas Björkman (Belarus) Max Mirnyi | 2–6, 4–6 |
| Win | 2007 | Shanghai (1) | Hard (i) | (The Bahamas) Mark Knowles | (Sweden) Simon Aspelin (Austria) Julian Knowle | 6–2, 6–3 |
| Win | 2008 | Shanghai (2) | Hard (i) | (Serbia) Nenad Zimonjić | (United States) Bob Bryan (United States) Mike Bryan | 7–6^{(7–3)}, 6–2 |
| Win | 2010 | London (3) | Hard (i) | (Serbia) Nenad Zimonjić | (India) Mahesh Bhupathi (Belarus) Max Mirnyi | 7–6^{(8–6)}, 6–4 |
| Win | 2011 | London (4) | Hard (i) | (Belarus) Max Mirnyi | (Poland) Mariusz Fyrstenberg (Poland) Marcin Matkowski | 7–5, 6–3 |

=== Masters 1000 finals ===
==== Doubles: 47 (28 titles, 19 runners-up) ====
| Result | Year | Tournament | Surface | Partner | Opponents | Score |
|---|---|---|---|---|---|---|
| Loss | 1995 | Cincinnati | Hard | (The Bahamas) Mark Knowles | (Australia) Todd Woodbridge (Australia) Mark Woodforde | 2–6, 0–3 ret. |
| Loss | 1996 | Toronto | Hard | (The Bahamas) Mark Knowles | (United States) Patrick Galbraith (Netherlands) Paul Haarhuis | 6–7, 3–6 |
| Win | 1996 | Hamburg (1) | Clay | (The Bahamas) Mark Knowles | (France) Guy Forget (Switzerland) Jakob Hlasek | 6–2, 6–4 |
| Win | 1996 | Cincinnati (1) | Hard | (The Bahamas) Mark Knowles | (Australia) Sandon Stolle (Czech Republic) Cyril Suk | 6–2, 7–5 |
| Win | 1997 | Indian Wells (1) | Hard | (The Bahamas) Mark Knowles | (Australia) Mark Philippoussis (Australia) Patrick Rafter | 7–5, 6–4 |
| Loss | 1997 | Miami | Hard | (The Bahamas) Mark Knowles | (Australia) Todd Woodbridge (Australia) Mark Woodforde | 4–6, 6–3, 3–6 |
| Win | 1997 | Rome (1) | Clay | (The Bahamas) Mark Knowles | (Zimbabwe) Byron Black (United States) Alex O'Brien | 6–3, 4–6, 7–5 |
| Win | 1998 | Cincinnati (2) | Hard | (The Bahamas) Mark Knowles | (France) Olivier Delaître (France) Fabrice Santoro | 6–1, 2–1 ret. |
| Win | 2000 | Toronto (1) | Hard | (Canada) Sébastien Lareau | (Australia) Joshua Eagle (Australia) Andrew Florent | 6–3, 7–6^{(7–3)} |
| Loss | 2000 | Paris | Carpet (i) | (Netherlands) Paul Haarhuis | (Sweden) Nicklas Kulti (Belarus) Max Mirnyi | 4–6, 5–7 |
| Loss | 2001 | Rome | Clay | (Australia) Sandon Stolle | (South Africa) Wayne Ferreira (Russia) Yevgeny Kafelnikov | 4–6, 6–7^{(6–8)} |
| Loss | 2001 | Hamburg | Clay | (Australia) Sandon Stolle | (Sweden) Jonas Björkman (Australia) Todd Woodbridge | 6–7^{(2–7)}, 6–3, 3–6 |
| Win | 2002 | Indian Wells (2) | Hard | (The Bahamas) Mark Knowles | (Switzerland) Roger Federer (Belarus) Max Mirnyi | 6–4, 6–4 |
| Win | 2002 | Miami (1) | Hard | (The Bahamas) Mark Knowles | (United States) Donald Johnson (United States) Jared Palmer | 4–6, 7–6^{(8–6)}, 6–2 |
| Win | 2002 | Madrid (1) | Hard (i) | (The Bahamas) Mark Knowles | (India) Mahesh Bhupathi (Belarus) Max Mirnyi | 6–4, 6–3 |
| Loss | 2002 | Toronto | Hard | (The Bahamas) Mark Knowles | (United States) Bob Bryan (United States) Mike Bryan | 6–4, 6–7^{(1–7)}, 3–6 |
| Win | 2003 | Hamburg (2) | Clay | (The Bahamas) Mark Knowles | (India) Mahesh Bhupathi (Belarus) Max Mirnyi | 6–4, 7–6^{(12–10)} |
| Win | 2004 | Cincinnati (3) | Hard | (The Bahamas) Mark Knowles | (Sweden) Jonas Björkman (Australia) Todd Woodbridge | 7–6^{(7–5)}, 6–3 |
| Win | 2004 | Madrid (2) | Hard (i) | (The Bahamas) Mark Knowles | (United States) Bob Bryan (United States) Mike Bryan | 6–3, 6–4 |
| Win | 2005 | Indian Wells (3) | Hard | (The Bahamas) Mark Knowles | (Australia) Wayne Arthurs (Australia) Paul Hanley | 7–6^{(8–6)}, 7–6^{(7–2)} |
| Win | 2005 | Madrid (3) | Hard (i) | (The Bahamas) Mark Knowles | (India) Leander Paes (Serbia and Montenegro) Nenad Zimonjić | 3–6, 6–3, 6–2 |
| Loss | 2005 | Paris | Carpet (i) | (The Bahamas) Mark Knowles | (United States) Bob Bryan (United States) Mike Bryan | 4–6, 7–6^{(7–3)}, 4–6 |
| Win | 2006 | Indian Wells (4) | Hard | (The Bahamas) Mark Knowles | (United States) Bob Bryan (United States) Mike Bryan | 6–4, 6–4 |
| Win | 2006 | Rome (2) | Clay | (The Bahamas) Mark Knowles | (Israel) Jonathan Erlich (Israel) Andy Ram | 4–6, 6–4, [10–6] |
| Loss | 2006 | Madrid | Hard (i) | (The Bahamas) Mark Knowles | (United States) Bob Bryan (United States) Mike Bryan | 5–7, 4–6 |
| Loss | 2006 | Hamburg | Clay | (The Bahamas) Mark Knowles | (Australia) Paul Hanley (Zimbabwe) Kevin Ullyett | 6–4, 6–7^{(5–7)}, [4–10] |
| Loss | 2007 | Paris | Hard (i) | (Serbia) Nenad Zimonjić | (United States) Bob Bryan (United States) Mike Bryan | 3–6, 6–7^{(4–7)} |
| Loss | 2008 | Indian Wells | Hard | (Serbia) Nenad Zimonjić | (Israel) Jonathan Erlich (Israel) Andy Ram | 4–6, 4–6 |
| Loss | 2008 | Rome | Clay | (Serbia) Nenad Zimonjić | (United States) Bob Bryan (United States) Mike Bryan | 6–3, 4–6, [8–10] |
| Win | 2008 | Hamburg (3) | Clay | (Serbia) Nenad Zimonjić | (United States) Bob Bryan (United States) Mike Bryan | 6–4, 5–7, [10–8] |
| Win | 2008 | Toronto (2) | Hard | (Serbia) Nenad Zimonjić | (United States) Bob Bryan (United States) Mike Bryan | 6–2, 4–6, [10–6] |
| Win | 2009 | Monte-Carlo (1) | Clay | (Serbia) Nenad Zimonjić | (United States) Bob Bryan (United States) Mike Bryan | 6–4, 6–1 |
| Win | 2009 | Rome (3) | Clay | (Serbia) Nenad Zimonjić | (United States) Bob Bryan (United States) Mike Bryan | 7–6^{(7–5)}, 6–3 |
| Win | 2009 | Madrid (4) | Clay | (Serbia) Nenad Zimonjić | (Sweden) Simon Aspelin (South Africa) Wesley Moodie | 6–4, 6–4 |
| Win | 2009 | Cincinnati (4) | Hard | (Serbia) Nenad Zimonjić | (United States) Bob Bryan (United States) Mike Bryan | 3–6, 7–6^{(7–2)}, [15–13] |
| Win | 2009 | Paris (1) | Hard (i) | (Serbia) Nenad Zimonjić | (Spain) Marcel Granollers (Spain) Tommy Robredo | 6–3, 6–4 |
| Loss | 2010 | Indian Wells | Hard | (Serbia) Nenad Zimonjić | (Spain) Marc López (Spain) Rafael Nadal | 6–7^{(8–10)}, 3–6 |
| Win | 2010 | Monte-Carlo (2) | Clay | (Serbia) Nenad Zimonjić | (India) Mahesh Bhupathi (Belarus) Max Mirnyi | 6–3, 2–0 ret. |
| Loss | 2010 | Madrid | Clay | (Serbia) Nenad Zimonjić | (United States) Bob Bryan (United States) Mike Bryan | 3–6, 4–6 |
| Loss | 2011 | Miami | Hard | (Belarus) Max Mirnyi | (India) Mahesh Bhupathi (India) Leander Paes | 7–6^{(7–5)}, 2–6, [5–10] |
| Win | 2011 | Shanghai (1) | Hard | (Belarus) Max Mirnyi | (France) Michaël Llodra (Serbia) Nenad Zimonjić | 3–6, 6–1, [12–10] |
| Loss | 2012 | Miami | Hard | (Belarus) Max Mirnyi | (India) Leander Paes (Czech Republic) Radek Štěpánek | 6–3, 1–6, [8–10] |
| Loss | 2012 | Monte-Carlo | Clay | (Belarus) Max Mirnyi | (United States) Bob Bryan (United States) Mike Bryan | 2–6, 3–6 |
| Win | 2014 | Madrid (5) | Clay | (Serbia) Nenad Zimonjić | (United States) Bob Bryan (United States) Mike Bryan | 6–4, 6–2 |
| Win | 2014 | Rome (4) | Clay | (Serbia) Nenad Zimonjić | (Netherlands) Robin Haase (Spain) Feliciano López | 6–4, 7–6^{(7–2)} |
| Loss | 2015 | Montreal | Hard | (France) Édouard Roger-Vasselin | (United States) Bob Bryan (United States) Mike Bryan | 6–7^{(5–7)}, 6–3, [6–10] |
| Win | 2015 | Cincinnati (5) | Hard | (France) Édouard Roger-Vasselin | (Poland) Marcin Matkowski (Serbia) Nenad Zimonjić | 6–2, 6–2 |

=== Olympic medal matches ===
==== Doubles: 2 (1 gold medal) ====
| Result | Year | Tournament | Surface | Partner | Opponents | Score |
|---|---|---|---|---|---|---|
| Gold | 2000 | Sydney Olympics | Hard | (Canada) Sébastien Lareau | (Australia) Todd Woodbridge (Australia) Mark Woodforde | 5–7, 6–3, 6–4, 7–6^{(7–2)} |
| 4th Place | 2016 | Rio de Janeiro Olympics | Hard | (Canada) Vasek Pospisil | (United States) Steve Johnson (United States) Jack Sock | 2–6, 4–6 |

== ATP career finals ==
=== Doubles: 151 (91 titles, 60 runners-up) ===
| Legend Grand Slam tournaments (8–9) Olympic Games (1–0) ATP World Tour Finals (4–2) ATP World Tour Masters 1000 (28–19) ATP World Tour 500 Series (20–11) ATP World Tour 250 Series (30–19) | Finals by surface Hard (56–38) Clay (23–13) Grass (8–4) Carpet (4–5) | Finals by setting Outdoor (67–43) Indoor (24–17) |

| Result | W–L | Date | Tournament | Tier | Surface | Partner | Opponents | Score |
|---|---|---|---|---|---|---|---|---|
| Win | 1–0 | Sep 1994 | Bancolombia Open, Colombia (1) | 250 Series | Clay | (The Bahamas) Mark Knowles | (United States) Luke Jensen (United States) Murphy Jensen | 6–4, 7–6^{(7–5)} |
| Loss | 1–1 | Jan 1995 | Australian Open, Australia | Grand Slam | Hard | (The Bahamas) Mark Knowles | (United States) Jared Palmer (United States) Richey Reneberg | 3–6, 6–3, 3–6, 2–6 |
| Loss | 1–2 | Aug 1995 | Cincinnati Masters, United States | Masters 1000 | Hard | (The Bahamas) Mark Knowles | (Australia) Todd Woodbridge (Australia) Mark Woodforde | 2–6, 0–3 ret. |
| Win | 2–2 | Aug 1995 | Indianapolis Tennis Championships, United States (1) | 500 Series | Hard | (The Bahamas) Mark Knowles | (United States) Scott Davis (United States) Todd Martin | 6–3, 7–5 |
| Win | 3–2 | Jan 1996 | Qatar Open, Qatar (1) | 250 Series | Hard | (The Bahamas) Mark Knowles | (Netherlands) Jacco Eltingh (Netherlands) Paul Haarhuis | 7–6^{(7–3)}, 6–3 |
| Win | 4–2 | Feb 1996 | U.S. National Indoor Tennis Championships, United States (1) | 500 Series | Hard (i) | (The Bahamas) Mark Knowles | (Australia) Todd Woodbridge (Australia) Mark Woodforde | 6–4, 7–5 |
| Win | 5–2 | May 1996 | Hamburg Masters, Germany (1) | Masters 1000 | Clay | (The Bahamas) Mark Knowles | (France) Guy Forget (Switzerland) Jakob Hlasek | 6–2, 6–4 |
| Loss | 5–3 | Jun 1996 | Rosmalen Grass Court Championships, Netherlands | 250 Series | Grass | (Sweden) Anders Järryd | (Australia) Paul Kilderry (Czech Republic) Pavel Vízner | 5–7, 3–6 |
| Win | 6–3 | Aug 1996 | Cincinnati Masters, United States (1) | Masters 1000 | Hard | (The Bahamas) Mark Knowles | (Australia) Sandon Stolle (Czech Republic) Cyril Suk | 6–2, 7–5 |
| Loss | 6–4 | Aug 1996 | Canadian Open, Canada | Masters 1000 | Hard | (The Bahamas) Mark Knowles | (United States) Patrick Galbraith (Netherlands) Paul Haarhuis | 6–7, 3–6 |
| Loss | 6–5 | Feb 1997 | Pacific Coast Championships, United States | 250 Series | Hard (i) | (The Bahamas) Mark Knowles | (United States) Brian MacPhie (South Africa) Gary Muller | 6–4, 6–7, 5–7 |
| Win | 7–5 | Mar 1997 | Indian Wells Masters, United States (1) | Masters 1000 | Hard | (The Bahamas) Mark Knowles | (Australia) Mark Philippoussis (Australia) Patrick Rafter | 7–5, 6–4 |
| Loss | 7–6 | Mar 1997 | Miami Open, United States | Masters 1000 | Hard | (The Bahamas) Mark Knowles | (Australia) Todd Woodbridge (Australia) Mark Woodforde | 4–6, 6–3, 3–6 |
| Win | 8–6 | May 1997 | Italian Open, Italy (1) | Masters 1000 | Clay | (The Bahamas) Mark Knowles | (Zimbabwe) Byron Black (United States) Alex O'Brien | 6–3, 4–6, 7–5 |
| Loss | 8–7 | Jan 1998 | Sydney International, Australia | 250 Series | Hard | (Netherlands) Jacco Eltingh | (Australia) Todd Woodbridge (Australia) Mark Woodforde | 3–6, 5–7 |
| Win | 9–7 | Apr 1998 | Japan Open, Japan (1) | 500 Series | Hard | (Canada) Sébastien Lareau | (France) Olivier Delaître (Italy) Stefano Pescosolido | 6–4, 3–6, 6–4 |
| Loss | 9–8 | May 1998 | French Open, France | Grand Slam | Clay | (The Bahamas) Mark Knowles | (Netherlands) Jacco Eltingh (Netherlands) Paul Haarhuis | 3–6, 6–3, 3–6 |
| Loss | 9–9 | Jun 1998 | Nottingham Open, United Kingdom | 250 Series | Grass | (Canada) Sébastien Lareau | (United States) Justin Gimelstob (South Africa) Byron Talbot | 5–7, 7–6, 4–6 |
| Win | 10–9 | Aug 1998 | Cincinnati Masters, United States (2) | Masters 1000 | Hard | (The Bahamas) Mark Knowles | (France) Olivier Delaître (France) Fabrice Santoro | 6–1, 2–1 ret. |
| Loss | 10–10 | Aug 1998 | Indianapolis Tennis Championships, United States | 500 Series | Hard | (The Bahamas) Mark Knowles | (Czech Republic) Jiří Novák (Czech Republic) David Rikl | 2–6, 6–7 |
| Loss | 10–11 | Aug 1998 | US Open, United States | Grand Slam | Hard | (The Bahamas) Mark Knowles | (Australia) Sandon Stolle (Czech Republic) Cyril Suk | 6–4, 6–7, 2–6 |
| Loss | 10–12 | Nov 1998 | ATP Finals, United States | Tour Finals | Carpet (i) | (The Bahamas) Mark Knowles | (Netherlands) Jacco Eltingh (Netherlands) Paul Haarhuis | 4–6, 2–6, 5–7 |
| Win | 11–12 | Jan 1999 | Sydney International, Australia (1) | 250 Series | Hard | (Canada) Sébastien Lareau | (United States) Patrick Galbraith (Netherlands) Paul Haarhuis | 6–3, 6–4 |
| Win | 12–12 | Oct 1999 | Kingfisher Airlines Tennis Open, China (1) | 250 Series | Hard | (Canada) Sébastien Lareau | (Australia) Todd Woodbridge (Australia) Mark Woodforde | 7–5, 6–3 |
| Win | 13–12 | Aug 2000 | Canadian Open, Canada (1) | Masters 1000 | Hard | (Canada) Sébastien Lareau | (Australia) Joshua Eagle (Australia) Andrew Florent | 6–3, 7–6^{(7–3)} |
| Win | 14–12 | Oct 2000 | Olympics, Australia (1) | Olympics | Hard | (Canada) Sébastien Lareau | (Australia) Todd Woodbridge (Australia) Mark Woodforde | 5–7, 6–3, 6–4, 7–6^{(7–2)} |
| Win | 15–12 | Nov 2000 | St. Petersburg Open, Russia (1) | 250 Series | Hard (i) | (Zimbabwe) Kevin Ullyett | (Japan) Thomas Shimada (South Africa) Myles Wakefield | 7–6^{(7–5)}, 7–5 |
| Loss | 15–13 | Nov 2000 | Paris Masters, France | Masters 1000 | Carpet (i) | (Netherlands) Paul Haarhuis | (Sweden) Nicklas Kulti (Belarus) Max Mirnyi | 4–6, 5–7 |
| Win | 16–13 | Nov 2000 | Stockholm Open, Sweden (1) | 250 Series | Hard (i) | (The Bahamas) Mark Knowles | (Czech Republic) Petr Pála (Czech Republic) Pavel Vízner | 6–3, 6–2 |
| Win | 17–13 | Jan 2001 | Qatar Open, Qatar (2) | 250 Series | Hard | (The Bahamas) Mark Knowles | (Spain) Juan Balcells (Russia) Andrei Olhovskiy | 6–3, 6–1 |
| Win | 18–13 | Jan 2001 | Sydney International, Australia (2) | 250 Series | Hard | (Australia) Sandon Stolle | (Sweden) Jonas Björkman (Australia) Todd Woodbridge | 2–6, 7–6^{(7–4)}, 7–6^{(7–5)} |
| Loss | 18–14 | Mar 2001 | Dubai Tennis Championships, United Arab Emirates | 500 Series | Hard | (Federal Republic of Yugoslavia) Nenad Zimonjić | (Australia) Joshua Eagle (Australia) Sandon Stolle | 4–6, 4–6 |
| Loss | 18–15 | May 2001 | Italian Open, Italy | Masters 1000 | Clay | (Australia) Sandon Stolle | (South Africa) Wayne Ferreira (Russia) Yevgeny Kafelnikov | 4–6, 6–7^{(6–8)} |
| Loss | 18–16 | May 2001 | Hamburg Masters, Germany | Masters 1000 | Clay | (Australia) Sandon Stolle | (Sweden) Jonas Björkman (Australia) Todd Woodbridge | 6–7^{(2–7)}, 6–3, 3–6 |
| Win | 19–16 | Jun 2001 | Halle Open, Germany (1) | 250 Series | Grass | (Australia) Sandon Stolle | (Belarus) Max Mirnyi (Australia) Patrick Rafter | 6–4, 6–7^{(5–7)}, 6–1 |
| Win | 20–16 | Oct 2001 | Open Sud de France, France (1) | 250 Series | Carpet (i) | (Federal Republic of Yugoslavia) Nenad Zimonjić | (France) Arnaud Clément (France) Sébastien Grosjean | 6–1, 6–2 |
| Win | 21–16 | Jan 2002 | Australian Open, Australia (1) | Grand Slam | Hard | (The Bahamas) Mark Knowles | (France) Michaël Llodra (France) Fabrice Santoro | 7–6^{(7–4)}, 6–3 |
| Loss | 21–17 | Feb 2002 | Rotterdam Open, Netherlands | 500 Series | Hard (i) | (The Bahamas) Mark Knowles | (Switzerland) Roger Federer (Belarus) Max Mirnyi | 6–4, 3–6, [4–10] |
| Win | 22–17 | Mar 2002 | Dubai Tennis Championships, United Arab Emirates (1) | 500 Series | Hard | (The Bahamas) Mark Knowles | (Australia) Joshua Eagle (Australia) Sandon Stolle | 3–6, 6–3, [13–11] |
| Loss | 22–18 | Mar 2002 | Tennis Channel Open, United States | 250 Series | Hard | (The Bahamas) Mark Knowles | (United States) Bob Bryan (United States) Mike Bryan | 5–7, 6–7^{(6–8)} |
| Win | 23–18 | Mar 2002 | Indian Wells Masters, United States (2) | Masters 1000 | Hard | (The Bahamas) Mark Knowles | (Switzerland) Roger Federer (Belarus) Max Mirnyi | 6–4, 6–4 |
| Win | 24–18 | Apr 2002 | Miami Open, United States (1) | Masters 1000 | Hard | (The Bahamas) Mark Knowles | (United States) Donald Johnson (United States) Jared Palmer | 4–6, 7–6^{(8–6)}, 6–2 |
| Loss | 24–19 | May 2002 | French Open, France | Grand Slam | Clay | (The Bahamas) Mark Knowles | (Netherlands) Paul Haarhuis (Russia) Yevgeny Kafelnikov | 5–7, 4–6 |
| Loss | 24–20 | Jun 2002 | Wimbledon, United Kingdom | Grand Slam | Grass | (The Bahamas) Mark Knowles | (Sweden) Jonas Björkman (Australia) Todd Woodbridge | 1–6, 2–6, 7–6^{(8–6)}, 5–7 |
| Loss | 24–21 | Jul 2002 | Canadian Open, Canada | Masters 1000 | Hard | (The Bahamas) Mark Knowles | (United States) Bob Bryan (United States) Mike Bryan | 6–4, 6–7^{(1–7)}, 3–6 |
| Win | 25–21 | Aug 2002 | Indianapolis Tennis Championships, United States (2) | 500 Series | Hard | (The Bahamas) Mark Knowles | (India) Mahesh Bhupathi (Belarus) Max Mirnyi | 4–6, 7–6^{(7–3)}, 6–4 |
| Loss | 25–22 | Oct 2002 | Open Sud de France, France | 250 Series | Carpet (i) | (The Bahamas) Mark Knowles | (Zimbabwe) Wayne Black (Zimbabwe) Kevin Ullyett | 4–6, 6–3, 6–7^{(3–7)} |
| Win | 26–22 | Oct 2002 | Madrid Open, Spain (1) | Masters 1000 | Hard (i) | (The Bahamas) Mark Knowles | (India) Mahesh Bhupathi (Belarus) Max Mirnyi | 6–4, 6–3 |
| Loss | 26–23 | Oct 2002 | Swiss Indoors, Switzerland | 250 Series | Carpet (i) | (The Bahamas) Mark Knowles | (United States) Bob Bryan (United States) Mike Bryan | 6–7^{(1–7)}, 5–7 |
| Loss | 26–24 | Jan 2003 | Qatar Open, Qatar | 250 Series | Hard | (The Bahamas) Mark Knowles | (Czech Republic) Martin Damm (Czech Republic) Cyril Suk | 4–6, 6–7^{(8–10)} |
| Loss | 26–25 | Jan 2003 | Australian Open, Australia | Grand Slam | Hard | (The Bahamas) Mark Knowles | (France) Michaël Llodra (France) Fabrice Santoro | 4–6, 6–3, 3–6 |
| Win | 27–25 | Feb 2003 | U.S. National Indoor Tennis Championships, United States (2) | 500 Series | Hard (i) | (The Bahamas) Mark Knowles | (United States) Bob Bryan (United States) Mike Bryan | 6–2, 7–6^{(7–3)} |
| Win | 28–25 | Mar 2003 | Mexican Open, Mexico (1) | 500 Series | Clay | (The Bahamas) Mark Knowles | (Spain) David Ferrer (Spain) Fernando Vicente | 6–3, 6–3 |
| Win | 29–25 | Apr 2003 | U.S. Men's Clay Court Championships, United States (1) | 250 Series | Clay | (The Bahamas) Mark Knowles | (United States) Jan-Michael Gambill (United States) Graydon Oliver | 6–4, 6–3 |
| Win | 30–25 | May 2003 | Hamburg Masters, Germany (2) | Masters 1000 | Clay | (The Bahamas) Mark Knowles | (India) Mahesh Bhupathi (Belarus) Max Mirnyi | 6–4, 7–6^{(12–10)} |
| Win | 31–25 | Jun 2003 | Queen's Club Championships, United Kingdom (1) | 250 Series | Grass | (The Bahamas) Mark Knowles | (India) Mahesh Bhupathi (Belarus) Max Mirnyi | 6–3, 6–4 |
| Win | 32–25 | Oct 2003 | Swiss Indoors, Switzerland (1) | 250 Series | Carpet (i) | (The Bahamas) Mark Knowles | (Argentina) Lucas Arnold Ker (Argentina) Mariano Hood | 6–4, 6–2 |
| Win | 33–25 | Mar 2004 | Open 13, France (1) | 250 Series | Hard (i) | (The Bahamas) Mark Knowles | (Czech Republic) Martin Damm (Czech Republic) Cyril Suk | 7–5, 6–3 |
| Win | 34–25 | May 2004 | Barcelona Open, Spain (1) | 500 Series | Clay | (The Bahamas) Mark Knowles | (Argentina) Mariano Hood (Argentina) Sebastián Prieto | 6–3, 6–2 |
| Loss | 34–26 | Jun 2004 | Queen's Club Championships, United Kingdom | 250 Series | Grass | (The Bahamas) Mark Knowles | (United States) Bob Bryan (United States) Mike Bryan | 4–6, 4–6 |
| Win | 35–26 | Aug 2004 | Cincinnati Masters, United States (3) | Masters 1000 | Hard | (The Bahamas) Mark Knowles | (Sweden) Jonas Björkman (Australia) Todd Woodbridge | 7–6^{(7–5)}, 6–3 |
| Win | 36–26 | Sep 2004 | US Open, United States (1) | Grand Slam | Hard | (The Bahamas) Mark Knowles | (India) Leander Paes (Czech Republic) David Rikl | 6–3, 6–3 |
| Win | 37–26 | Oct 2004 | Madrid Open, Spain (2) | Masters 1000 | Hard (i) | (The Bahamas) Mark Knowles | (United States) Bob Bryan (United States) Mike Bryan | 6–3, 6–4 |
| Loss | 37–27 | Feb 2005 | Open 13, France | 250 Series | Hard (i) | (The Bahamas) Mark Knowles | (Czech Republic) Martin Damm (Czech Republic) Radek Štěpánek | 6–7^{(4–7)}, 6–7^{(5–7)} |
| Win | 38–27 | Mar 2005 | Indian Wells Masters, United States (3) | Masters 1000 | Hard | (The Bahamas) Mark Knowles | (Australia) Wayne Arthurs (Australia) Paul Hanley | 7–6^{(8–6)}, 7–6^{(7–2)} |
| Win | 39–27 | Apr 2005 | U.S. Men's Clay Court Championships, United States (2) | 250 Series | Clay | (The Bahamas) Mark Knowles | (Argentina) Martín García (Peru) Luis Horna | 6–3, 6–4 |
| Win | 40–27 | Oct 2005 | Vienna Open, Austria (1) | 500 Series | Hard (i) | (The Bahamas) Mark Knowles | (Israel) Jonathan Erlich (Israel) Andy Ram | 5–3, 5–4^{(7–2)} |
| Win | 41–27 | Oct 2005 | Madrid Open, Spain (3) | Masters 1000 | Hard (i) | (The Bahamas) Mark Knowles | (India) Leander Paes (Serbia and Montenegro) Nenad Zimonjić | 3–6, 6–3, 6–2 |
| Loss | 41–28 | Oct 2005 | Paris Masters, France | Masters 1000 | Carpet (i) | (The Bahamas) Mark Knowles | (United States) Bob Bryan (United States) Mike Bryan | 4–6, 7–6^{(7–3)}, 4–6 |
| Win | 42–28 | Feb 2006 | Delray Beach Open, United States (1) | 250 Series | Hard | (The Bahamas) Mark Knowles | (South Africa) Chris Haggard (South Africa) Wesley Moodie | 6–2, 6–3 |
| Loss | 42–29 | Feb 2006 | Open 13, France | 250 Series | Hard (i) | (The Bahamas) Mark Knowles | (Czech Republic) Martin Damm (Czech Republic) Radek Štěpánek | 2–6, 7–6^{(7–4)}, [3–10] |
| Loss | 42–30 | Mar 2006 | Dubai Tennis Championships, United Arab Emirates | 500 Series | Hard | (The Bahamas) Mark Knowles | (Australia) Paul Hanley (Zimbabwe) Kevin Ullyett | 6–1, 2–6, [1–10] |
| Win | 43–30 | Mar 2006 | Indian Wells Masters, United States (4) | Masters 1000 | Hard | (The Bahamas) Mark Knowles | (United States) Bob Bryan (United States) Mike Bryan | 6–4, 6–4 |
| Win | 44–30 | May 2006 | Barcelona Open, Spain (2) | 500 Series | Clay | (The Bahamas) Mark Knowles | (Poland) Mariusz Fyrstenberg (Poland) Marcin Matkowski | 6–7^{(5–7)}, 6–3, [10–5] |
| Win | 45–30 | May 2006 | Italian Open, Italy (2) | Masters 1000 | Clay | (The Bahamas) Mark Knowles | (Israel) Jonathan Erlich (Israel) Andy Ram | 4–6, 6–4, [10–6] |
| Loss | 45–31 | May 2006 | Hamburg Masters, Germany | Masters 1000 | Clay | (The Bahamas) Mark Knowles | (Australia) Paul Hanley (Zimbabwe) Kevin Ullyett | 6–4, 6–7^{(5–7)}, [4–10] |
| Loss | 45–32 | Oct 2006 | Madrid Open, Spain | Masters 1000 | Hard (i) | (The Bahamas) Mark Knowles | (United States) Bob Bryan (United States) Bob Bryan | 5–7, 4–6 |
| Win | 46–32 | Oct 2006 | Swiss Indoors, Switzerland (2) | 250 Series | Carpet (i) | (The Bahamas) Mark Knowles | (Poland) Mariusz Fyrstenberg (Poland) Marcin Matkowski | 4–6, 6–4, [10–8] |
| Loss | 46–33 | Nov 2006 | ATP Finals, China | Tour Finals | Hard | (The Bahamas) Mark Knowles | (Sweden) Jonas Björkman (Belarus) Max Mirnyi | 2–6, 4–6 |
| Loss | 46–34 | Jan 2007 | Sydney International, Australia | 250 Series | Hard | (The Bahamas) Mark Knowles | (Australia) Paul Hanley (Zimbabwe) Kevin Ullyett | 4–6, 7–6^{(7–3)}, [6–10] |
| Loss | 46–35 | Feb 2007 | Open 13, France | 250 Series | Hard (i) | (The Bahamas) Mark Knowles | (France) Arnaud Clément (France) Michaël Llodra | 5–7, 6–4, [8–10] |
| Loss | 46–36 | Apr 2007 | U.S. Men's Clay Court Championships, United States | 250 Series | Clay | (The Bahamas) Mark Knowles | (United States) Bob Bryan (United States) Mike Bryan | 6–7^{(3–7)}, 4–6 |
| Win | 47–36 | Jun 2007 | French Open, France (1) | Grand Slam | Clay | (The Bahamas) Mark Knowles | (Czech Republic) Lukáš Dlouhý (Czech Republic) Pavel Vízner | 2–6, 6–3, 6–4 |
| Win | 48–36 | Jun 2007 | Queen's Club Championships, United Kingdom (2) | 250 Series | Grass | (The Bahamas) Mark Knowles | (United States) Bob Bryan (United States) Mike Bryan | 7–6^{(7–4)}, 7–5 |
| Win | 49–36 | Oct 2007 | St. Petersburg Open, Russia (2) | 250 Series | Carpet (i) | (Serbia) Nenad Zimonjić | (Austria) Jürgen Melzer (Australia) Todd Perry | 6–1, 7–6^{(7–3)} |
| Loss | 49–37 | Nov 2007 | Paris Masters, France | Masters 1000 | Hard (i) | (Serbia) Nenad Zimonjić | (United States) Bob Bryan (United States) Bob Bryan | 3–6, 6–7^{(4–7)} |
| Win | 50–37 | Nov 2007 | ATP Finals, China (1) | Tour Finals | Hard | (The Bahamas) Mark Knowles | (Sweden) Simon Aspelin (Austria) Julian Knowle | 6–2, 6–3 |
| Loss | 50–38 | Mar 2008 | Indian Wells Masters, United States | Masters 1000 | Hard | (Serbia) Nenad Zimonjić | (Israel) Jonathan Erlich (Israel) Andy Ram | 4–6, 4–6 |
| Loss | 50–39 | May 2008 | Italian Open, Italy | Masters 1000 | Clay | (Serbia) Nenad Zimonjić | (United States) Bob Bryan (United States) Mike Bryan | 6–3, 4–6, [8–10] |
| Win | 51–39 | May 2008 | Hamburg Masters, Germany (3) | Masters 1000 | Clay | (Serbia) Nenad Zimonjić | (United States) Bob Bryan (United States) Mike Bryan | 6–4, 5–7, [10–8] |
| Loss | 51–40 | May 2008 | French Open, France | Grand Slam | Clay | (Serbia) Nenad Zimonjić | (Uruguay) Pablo Cuevas (Peru) Luis Horna | 2–6, 3–6 |
| Win | 52–40 | Jun 2008 | Queen's Club Championships, United Kingdom (3) | 250 Series | Grass | (Serbia) Nenad Zimonjić | (Brazil) Marcelo Melo (Brazil) André Sá | 6–4, 7–6^{(7–3)} |
| Win | 53–40 | Jul 2008 | Wimbledon, United Kingdom (1) | Grand Slam | Grass | (Serbia) Nenad Zimonjić | (Sweden) Jonas Björkman (Zimbabwe) Kevin Ullyett | 7–6^{(14–12)}, 6–7^{(3–7)}, 6–3, 6–3 |
| Win | 54–40 | Jul 2008 | Canadian Open, Canada (2) | Masters 1000 | Hard | (Serbia) Nenad Zimonjić | (United States) Bob Bryan (United States) Mike Bryan | 6–2, 4–6, [10–6] |
| Win | 55–40 | Nov 2008 | ATP Finals, China (2) | Tour Finals | Hard | (Serbia) Nenad Zimonjić | (United States) Bob Bryan (United States) Mike Bryan | 7–6^{(7–3)}, 6–2 |
| Loss | 55–41 | Jan 2009 | Qatar Open, Qatar | 250 Series | Hard | (Serbia) Nenad Zimonjić | (Spain) Marc López (Spain) Rafael Nadal | 6–4, 4–6, [8–10] |
| Loss | 55–42 | Jan 2009 | Sydney International, Australia | 250 Series | Hard | (Serbia) Nenad Zimonjić | (United States) Bob Bryan (United States) Mike Bryan | 1–6, 6–7^{(3–7)} |
| Win | 56–42 | Feb 2009 | Rotterdam Open, Netherlands (1) | 500 Series | Hard (i) | (Serbia) Nenad Zimonjić | (Czech Republic) Lukáš Dlouhý (India) Leander Paes | 6–2, 7–5 |
| Win | 57–42 | Apr 2009 | Monte-Carlo Masters, Monaco (1) | Masters 1000 | Clay | (Serbia) Nenad Zimonjić | (United States) Bob Bryan (United States) Mike Bryan | 6–4, 6–1 |
| Win | 58–42 | Apr 2009 | Barcelona Open, Spain (3) | 500 Series | Clay | (Serbia) Nenad Zimonjić | (India) Mahesh Bhupathi (The Bahamas) Mark Knowles | 6–3, 7–6^{(11–9)} |
| Win | 59–42 | May 2009 | Italian Open, Italy (3) | Masters 1000 | Clay | (Serbia) Nenad Zimonjić | (United States) Bob Bryan (United States) Mike Bryan | 7–6^{(7–5)}, 6–3 |
| Win | 60–42 | May 2009 | Madrid Open, Spain (4) | Masters 1000 | Clay | (Serbia) Nenad Zimonjić | (Sweden) Simon Aspelin (South Africa) Wesley Moodie | 6–4, 6–4 |
| Win | 61–42 | Jul 2009 | Wimbledon, United Kingdom (2) | Grand Slam | Grass | (Serbia) Nenad Zimonjić | (United States) Bob Bryan (United States) Mike Bryan | 7–6^{(9–7)}, 6–7^{(3–7)}, 7–6^{(7–3)}, 6–3 |
| Win | 62–42 | Aug 2009 | Cincinnati Masters, United States (4) | Masters 1000 | Hard | (Serbia) Nenad Zimonjić | (United States) Bob Bryan (United States) Mike Bryan | 3–6, 7–6^{(7–2)}, [15–13] |
| Win | 63–42 | Nov 2009 | Swiss Indoors, Switzerland (3) | 500 Series | Hard (i) | (Serbia) Nenad Zimonjić | (United States) Bob Bryan (United States) Mike Bryan | 6–2, 6–3 |
| Win | 64–42 | Nov 2009 | Paris Masters, France (1) | Masters 1000 | Hard (i) | (Serbia) Nenad Zimonjić | (Spain) Marcel Granollers (Spain) Tommy Robredo | 6–3, 6–4 |
| Win | 65–42 | Jan 2010 | Sydney International, Australia (3) | 250 Series | Hard | (Serbia) Nenad Zimonjić | (United Kingdom) Ross Hutchins (Australia) Jordan Kerr | 6–3, 7–6^{(7–5)} |
| Loss | 65–43 | Jan 2010 | Australian Open, Australia | Grand Slam | Hard | (Serbia) Nenad Zimonjić | (United States) Bob Bryan (United States) Mike Bryan | 3–6, 7–6^{(7–5)}, 3–6 |
| Win | 66–43 | Feb 2010 | Rotterdam Open, Netherlands (2) | 500 Series | Hard (i) | (Serbia) Nenad Zimonjić | (Sweden) Simon Aspelin (Australia) Paul Hanley | 4–6, 6–4, [7–10] |
| Loss | 66–44 | Mar 2010 | Indian Wells Masters, United States | Masters 1000 | Hard | (Serbia) Nenad Zimonjić | (Spain) Marc López (Spain) Rafael Nadal | 6–7^{(8–10)}, 3–6 |
| Win | 67–44 | Apr 2010 | Monte-Carlo Masters, Monaco (2) | Masters 1000 | Clay | (Serbia) Nenad Zimonjić | (India) Mahesh Bhupathi (Belarus) Max Mirnyi | 6–3, 2–0 ret. |
| Win | 68–44 | Apr 2010 | Barcelona Open, Spain (4) | 500 Series | Clay | (Serbia) Nenad Zimonjić | (Australia) Lleyton Hewitt (The Bahamas) Mark Knowles | 4–6, 6–3, [10–6] |
| Loss | 68–45 | May 2010 | Madrid Open, Spain | Masters 1000 | Clay | (Serbia) Nenad Zimonjić | (United States) Bob Bryan (United States) Mike Bryan | 3–6, 4–6 |
| Win | 69–45 | Jun 2010 | French Open, France (2) | Grand Slam | Clay | (Serbia) Nenad Zimonjić | (Czech Republic) Lukáš Dlouhý (India) Leander Paes | 7–5, 6–2 |
| Win | 70–45 | Oct 2010 | Vienna Open, Austria (2) | 250 Series | Hard (i) | (Serbia) Nenad Zimonjić | (Poland) Mariusz Fyrstenberg (Poland) Marcin Matkowski | 7–5, 3–6, [10–5] |
| Loss | 70–46 | Nov 2010 | Swiss Indoors, Switzerland | 500 Series | Hard (i) | (Serbia) Nenad Zimonjić | (United States) Bob Bryan (United States) Mike Bryan | 3–6, 6–3, [3–10] |
| Win | 71–46 | Nov 2010 | ATP Finals, United Kingdom (3) | Tour Finals | Hard (i) | (Serbia) Nenad Zimonjić | (India) Mahesh Bhupathi (Belarus) Max Mirnyi | 7–6^{(8–6)}, 6–4 |
| Win | 72–46 | Feb 2011 | U.S. National Indoor Tennis Championships, United States (3) | 500 Series | Hard (i) | (Belarus) Max Mirnyi | (United States) Eric Butorac (Curaçao) Jean-Julien Rojer | 6–2, 6–7^{(6–8)}, [10–3] |
| Loss | 72–47 | Mar 2011 | Miami Open, United States | Masters 1000 | Hard | (Belarus) Max Mirnyi | (India) Mahesh Bhupathi (India) Leander Paes | 7–6^{(7–5)}, 2–6, [5–10] |
| Win | 73–47 | Jun 2011 | French Open, France (3) | Grand Slam | Clay | (Belarus) Max Mirnyi | (Colombia) Juan Sebastián Cabal (Argentina) Eduardo Schwank | 7–6^{(7–3)}, 3–6, 6–4 |
| Win | 74–47 | Oct 2011 | Shanghai Masters, China (1) | Masters 1000 | Hard | (Belarus) Max Mirnyi | (France) Michaël Llodra (Serbia) Nenad Zimonjić | 3–6, 6–1, [12–10] |
| Loss | 74–48 | Oct 2011 | Vienna Open, Austria | 250 Series | Hard (i) | (Belarus) Max Mirnyi | (United States) Bob Bryan (United States) Mike Bryan | 6–7^{(10–12)}, 3–6 |
| Loss | 74–49 | Nov 2011 | Swiss Indoors, Switzerland | 500 Series | Hard (i) | (Belarus) Max Mirnyi | (France) Michaël Llodra (Serbia) Nenad Zimonjić | 4–6, 5–7 |
| Win | 75–49 | Nov 2011 | ATP Finals, United Kingdom (4) | Tour Finals | Hard (i) | (Belarus) Max Mirnyi | (Poland) Mariusz Fyrstenberg (Poland) Marcin Matkowski | 7–5, 6–3 |
| Win | 76–49 | Jan 2012 | Brisbane International, Australia (1) | 250 Series | Hard | (Belarus) Max Mirnyi | (Austria) Jürgen Melzer (Germany) Philipp Petzschner | 6–1, 6–2 |
| Win | 77–49 | Feb 2012 | U.S. National Indoor Tennis Championships, United States (4) | 500 Series | Hard (i) | (Belarus) Max Mirnyi | (Croatia) Ivan Dodig (Brazil) Marcelo Melo | 4–6, 7–5, [10–7] |
| Loss | 77–50 | Mar 2012 | Miami Open, United States | Masters 1000 | Hard | (Belarus) Max Mirnyi | (India) Leander Paes (Czech Republic) Radek Štěpánek | 6–3, 1–6, [8–10] |
| Loss | 77–51 | Apr 2012 | Monte-Carlo Masters, Monaco | Masters 1000 | Clay | (Belarus) Max Mirnyi | (United States) Bob Bryan (United States) Mike Bryan | 2–6, 3–6 |
| Win | 78–51 | Jun 2012 | French Open, France (4) | Grand Slam | Clay | (Belarus) Max Mirnyi | (United States) Bob Bryan (United States) Mike Bryan | 6–4, 6–4 |
| Win | 79–51 | Jun 2012 | Queen's Club Championships, United Kingdom (4) | 250 Series | Grass | (Belarus) Max Mirnyi | (United States) Bob Bryan (United States) Mike Bryan | 6–3, 6–4 |
| Win | 80–51 | Oct 2012 | Swiss Indoors, Switzerland (4) | 500 Series | Hard (i) | (Serbia) Nenad Zimonjić | (Philippines) Treat Conrad Huey (United Kingdom) Dominic Inglot | 7–5, 6–7^{(4–7)}, [10–5] |
| Loss | 80–52 | Apr 2013 | Barcelona Open, Spain | 500 Series | Clay | (Sweden) Robert Lindstedt | (Austria) Alexander Peya (Brazil) Bruno Soares | 7–5, 6–7^{(7–9)}, [4–10] |
| Win | 81–52 | Aug 2013 | Winston-Salem Open, United States (1) | 250 Series | Hard | (India) Leander Paes | (Philippines) Treat Conrad Huey (United Kingdom) Dominic Inglot | 7–6^{(12–10)}, 7–5 |
| Loss | 81–53 | Oct 2013 | Vienna Open, Austria | 250 Series | Hard (i) | (Austria) Julian Knowle | (Romania) Florin Mergea (Czech Republic) Lukáš Rosol | 5–7, 4–6 |
| Win | 82–53 | Jan 2014 | Brisbane International, Australia (2) | 250 Series | Hard | (Poland) Mariusz Fyrstenberg | (Colombia) Juan Sebastián Cabal (Colombia) Robert Farah | 6–7^{(4–7)}, 6–4, [10–7] |
| Win | 83–53 | Jan 2014 | Sydney International, Australia (4) | 250 Series | Hard | (Serbia) Nenad Zimonjić | (India) Rohan Bopanna (Pakistan) Aisam-ul-Haq Qureshi | 7–6^{(7–3)}, 7–6^{(7–3)} |
| Loss | 83–54 | Mar 2014 | Dubai Tennis Championships, United Arab Emirates | 500 Series | Hard | (Serbia) Nenad Zimonjić | (India) Rohan Bopanna (Pakistan) Aisam-ul-Haq Qureshi | 4–6, 3–6 |
| Loss | 83–55 | Apr 2014 | Barcelona Open, Spain | 500 Series | Clay | (Serbia) Nenad Zimonjić | (Netherlands) Jesse Huta Galung (France) Stéphane Robert | 3–6, 3–6 |
| Win | 84–55 | May 2014 | Madrid Open, Spain (5) | Masters 1000 | Clay | (Serbia) Nenad Zimonjić | (United States) Bob Bryan (United States) Mike Bryan | 6–4, 6–2 |
| Win | 85–55 | May 2014 | Italian Open, Italy (4) | Masters 1000 | Clay | (Serbia) Nenad Zimonjić | (Netherlands) Robin Haase (Spain) Feliciano López | 6–4, 7–6^{(7–2)} |
| Win | 86–55 | Jan 2015 | Sydney International, Australia (5) | 250 Series | Hard | (India) Rohan Bopanna | (Netherlands) Jean-Julien Rojer (Romania) Horia Tecău | 6–4, 7–6^{(7–5)} |
| Win | 87–55 | Feb 2015 | Dubai Tennis Championships, United Arab Emirates (2) | 500 Series | Hard | (India) Rohan Bopanna | (Pakistan) Aisam-ul-Haq Qureshi (Serbia) Nenad Zimonjić | 6–4, 6–1 |
| Loss | 87–56 | Aug 2015 | Canadian Open, Canada | Masters 1000 | Hard | (France) Édouard Roger-Vasselin | (United States) Bob Bryan (United States) Mike Bryan | 6–7^{(5–7)}, 6–3, [6–10] |
| Win | 88–56 | Aug 2015 | Cincinnati Masters, United States (5) | Masters 1000 | Hard | (France) Édouard Roger-Vasselin | (Poland) Marcin Matkowski (Serbia) Nenad Zimonjić | 6–2, 6–2 |
| Loss | 88–57 | Oct 2015 | China Open, China | 500 Series | Hard | (France) Édouard Roger-Vasselin | (Canada) Vasek Pospisil (United States) Jack Sock | 6–3, 3–6, [6–10] |
| Loss | 88–58 | Jan 2016 | Australian Open, Australia | Grand Slam | Hard | (Czech Republic) Radek Štěpánek | (United Kingdom) Jamie Murray (Brazil) Bruno Soares | 6–2, 4–6, 5–7 |
| Win | 89–58 | Jun 2016 | Nottingham Open, United Kingdom (1) | 250 Series | Grass | (United Kingdom) Dominic Inglot | (Croatia) Ivan Dodig (Brazil) Marcelo Melo | 7–5, 7–6^{(7–4)} |
| Loss | 89–59 | Jul 2016 | German Open Tennis Championships, Germany | 500 Series | Clay | (Pakistan) Aisam-ul-Haq Qureshi | (Finland) Henri Kontinen (Australia) John Peers | 5–7, 3–6 |
| Win | 90–59 | Jul 2016 | Washington Open, United States (1) | 500 Series | Hard | (France) Édouard Roger-Vasselin | (Poland) Łukasz Kubot (Austria) Alexander Peya | 7–6^{(7–3)}, 7–6^{(7–4)} |
| Win | 91–59 | Oct 2016 | European Open, Belgium (1) | 250 Series | Hard (i) | (France) Édouard Roger-Vasselin | (France) Pierre-Hugues Herbert (France) Nicolas Mahut | 6−4, 6−4 |
| Loss | 91–60 | Feb 2017 | Open Sud de France, France | 250 Series | Hard (i) | (France) Fabrice Martin | (Germany) Alexander Zverev (Germany) Mischa Zverev | 4–6, 7–6^{(7–3)}, [7–10] |

== Performance timelines ==
Key
| W | F | SF | QF | #R | RR | Q# | P# | DNQ | A | Z# | PO | G | S | B | NMS | NTI | P | NH |

(W) winner; (F) finalist; (SF) semifinalist; (QF) quarterfinalist; (#R) rounds 4, 3, 2, 1; (RR) round-robin stage; (Q#) qualification round; (P#) preliminary round; (DNQ) did not qualify; (A) absent; (Z#) Davis/Fed Cup Zonal Group (with number indication) or (PO) play-off; (G) gold, (S) silver or (B) bronze Olympic/Paralympic medal; (NMS) not a Masters tournament; (NTI) not a Tier I tournament; (P) postponed; (NH) not held; (SR) strike rate (events won / competed); (W–L) win–loss record.

=== Singles ===
| Tournament | 1992 | 1993 | 1994 | 1995 | 1996 | 1997 | 1998 | 1999 | 2000 | 2001 | SR | W–L | Win % |
|---|---|---|---|---|---|---|---|---|---|---|---|---|---|
Grand Slam tournaments
| Australian Open | 1R | A | Q2 | 2R | 1R | 1R | 3R | 3R | A | 3R | 0 / 7 | 7–7 | 50% |
| French Open | A | A | A | A | Q3 | 1R | 1R | 1R | Q1 | A | 0 / 3 | 0–3 | 0% |
| Wimbledon | Q1 | Q2 | Q1 | 2R | 1R | 1R | 1R | 4R | 2R | 2R | 0 / 7 | 6–7 | 46% |
| US Open | Q3 | 1R | Q1 | 2R | A | 1R | 1R | 1R | 2R | A | 0 / 6 | 2–6 | 25% |
| Win–loss | 0–1 | 0–1 | 0–0 | 3–3 | 0–2 | 0–4 | 2–4 | 5–4 | 2–2 | 3–2 | 0 / 23 | 15–23 | 39% |

=== Doubles ===
| Tournament | 1989 | 1990 | 1991 | 1992 | 1993 | 1994 | 1995 | 1996 | 1997 | 1998 | 1999 | 2000 | 2001 | 2002 | 2003 | 2004 | 2005 | 2006 | 2007 | 2008 | 2009 | 2010 | 2011 | 2012 | 2013 | 2014 | 2015 | 2016 | 2017 | 2018 | SR | W–L | Win % |
|---|---|---|---|---|---|---|---|---|---|---|---|---|---|---|---|---|---|---|---|---|---|---|---|---|---|---|---|---|---|---|---|---|---|
Grand Slam tournaments
| Australian Open | A | A | A | A | A | QF | F | QF | QF | 1R | 2R | A | QF | W | F | QF | 1R | 1R | SF | QF | 2R | F | SF | SF | 3R | SF | 2R | F | 2R | 1R | 1 / 24 | 66–23 | 74% |
| French Open | A | A | A | A | A | A | A | 2R | 2R | F | 2R | QF | 3R | F | 3R | QF | SF | 2R | W | F | SF | W | W | W | 2R | QF | 3R | 3R | 1R | 1R | 4 / 23 | 69–18 | 79% |
| Wimbledon | A | A | A | Q3 | Q2 | 1R | SF | 3R | 3R | 3R | SF | QF | 2R | F | QF | SF | A | SF | QF | W | W | 2R | 2R | 2R | QF | QF | 3R | 2R | 2R | 1R | 2 / 24 | 61–22 | 73% |
| US Open | A | A | A | A | A | 2R | QF | 1R | 3R | F | 1R | QF | 3R | QF | SF | W | 1R | 3R | QF | 3R | QF | 3R | 2R | 1R | 3R | 3R | 3R | 1R | 1R | 1R | 1 / 25 | 47–24 | 66% |
| Win–loss | 0–0 | 0–0 | 0–0 | 0–0 | 0–0 | 4–3 | 12–3 | 6–4 | 7–4 | 12–4 | 5–3 | 9–3 | 8–4 | 19–3 | 14–4 | 16–3 | 4–3 | 7–4 | 16–3 | 16–3 | 14–3 | 14–3 | 12–3 | 11–3 | 8–4 | 12–4 | 7–4 | 8–4 | 2–4 | 0–4 | 8 / 96 | 243–87 | 74% |
Year-end championships
| ATP Finals | did not qualify | | | | | | RR | RR | RR | F | did not qualify | | | NH | SF | SF | RR | F | W | W | RR | W | W | RR | DNQ | RR | did not qualify | | | | 4 / 15 | 34–23 | 60% |
National representation
| Summer Olympics | not held | | | A | not held | | | 2R | not held | | | G | not held | | | 2R | not held | | | 1R | not held | | | 2R | not held | | | 4th | not held | | 1 / 6 | 11–6 | 65% |
| Davis Cup | A | A | A | 1R | AZ1 | AZ2 | AZ2 | AZ1 | PO | AZ1 | AZ1 | AZ1 | A | PO | PO | 1R | PO | AZ1 | AZ1 | AZ1 | AZ1 | AZ1 | PO | 1R | SF | 1R | QF | A | 1R | 1R | 0 / 8 | 33–13 | 72% |
| Win–loss | 0–0 | 0–0 | 0–0 | 0–0 | 0–1 | 1–1 | 3–0 | 1–1 | 1–0 | 2–0 | 2–0 | 6–0 | 0–0 | 2–1 | 2–0 | 3–1 | 2–0 | 2–0 | 2–0 | 1–2 | 2–0 | 2–0 | 2–0 | 1–3 | 2–1 | 0–2 | 1–1 | 3–2 | 1–1 | 0–2 | 1 / 14 | 44–19 | 70% |
ATP World Tour Masters 1000
| Indian Wells Masters | A | A | A | A | A | Q2 | 2R | 1R | W | 2R | 2R | A | 1R | W | QF | SF | W | W | 1R | F | 1R | F | 1R | SF | 1R | 2R | 2R | 2R | 1R | 1R | 4 / 23 | 39–19 | 67% |
| Miami Open | A | A | A | A | A | 1R | QF | SF | F | SF | 2R | A | 2R | W | QF | SF | SF | 1R | QF | 1R | 1R | 2R | F | F | 2R | QF | 1R | 1R | SF | 1R | 1 / 24 | 41–23 | 64% |
| Monte-Carlo Masters | A | A | A | A | A | A | A | A | A | A | A | A | A | QF | 2R | SF | QF | 2R | 2R | 2R | W | W | QF | F | QF | SF | 2R | 2R | 1R | A | 2 / 16 | 21–14 | 60% |
| Madrid Open (Note: 1995–2001 Stuttgart Masters, 2002–2008 Madrid Masters (both on hard court).) | not held | | | | | | 1R | 1R | QF | 1R | A | 2R | QF | W | QF | W | W | F | 2R | QF | W | F | QF | SF | QF | W | 2R | 1R | 2R | 1R | 5 / 23 | 34–18 | 65% |
| Italian Open | A | A | A | A | A | A | 1R | 1R | W | A | QF | 1R | F | QF | QF | QF | QF | W | SF | F | W | 2R | 2R | QF | QF | W | 2R | 1R | 1R | A | 4 / 22 | 36–18 | 67% |
| Canadian Open | 1R | 1R | 1R | 1R | QF | SF | 2R | F | 1R | QF | 2R | W | 1R | F | 2R | SF | QF | SF | QF | W | SF | QF | SF | QF | SF | SF | F | SF | 1R | 1R | 2 / 30 | 45–28 | 62% |
| Cincinnati Masters | A | A | A | A | A | A | F | W | QF | W | SF | SF | 1R | QF | SF | W | SF | QF | QF | SF | W | 2R | 2R | 2R | 2R | QF | W | SF | 1R | 1R | 5 / 24 | 44–19 | 70% |
| Shanghai Masters | not held | | | | | | | | | | | | | | | | | | | | 2R | QF | W | QF | 2R | 2R | SF | 2R | A | A | 1 / 8 | 8–7 | 53% |
| Paris Masters | A | A | A | A | A | A | QF | QF | QF | SF | SF | F | SF | QF | SF | QF | F | QF | F | 2R | W | QF | SF | QF | 2R | QF | 2R | SF | A | A | 1 / 22 | 36–21 | 63% |
| German Open | A | A | A | A | A | A | 1R | W | 1R | A | QF | 2R | F | QF | W | QF | QF | F | 2R | W | not Masters 1000 | | | | | | | | | | 3 / 13 | 25–10 | 71% |
| Win–loss | 0–1 | 0–1 | 0–1 | 0–1 | 2–1 | 3–2 | 9–8 | 15–6 | 17–6 | 13–5 | 8–7 | 12–5 | 11–8 | 26–6 | 13–8 | 21–7 | 21–7 | 19–7 | 9–9 | 18–7 | 21–4 | 14–8 | 14–8 | 16–9 | 6–9 | 17–7 | 13–8 | 8–9 | 3–7 | 0–5 | 28 / 205 | 329–177 | 65% |
Career statistics
| | 1989 | 1990 | 1991 | 1992 | 1993 | 1994 | 1995 | 1996 | 1997 | 1998 | 1999 | 2000 | 2001 | 2002 | 2003 | 2004 | 2005 | 2006 | 2007 | 2008 | 2009 | 2010 | 2011 | 2012 | 2013 | 2014 | 2015 | 2016 | 2017 | 2018 | SR | W–L | Win % |
| Tournaments | 1 | 1 | 1 | 2 | 3 | 12 | 17 | 18 | 20 | 18 | 20 | 15 | 19 | 21 | 23 | 26 | 20 | 24 | 24 | 25 | 25 | 25 | 23 | 23 | 25 | 25 | 26 | 27 | 29 | 19 | 557 | | |
| Titles | 0 | 0 | 0 | 0 | 0 | 1 | 1 | 4 | 2 | 2 | 2 | 4 | 4 | 6 | 6 | 5 | 4 | 5 | 4 | 5 | 9 | 7 | 4 | 5 | 1 | 4 | 3 | 3 | 0 | 0 | 91 | | |
| Finals | 0 | 0 | 0 | 0 | 0 | 1 | 3 | 6 | 4 | 8 | 2 | 5 | 7 | 13 | 8 | 6 | 6 | 10 | 8 | 8 | 11 | 11 | 7 | 7 | 3 | 6 | 5 | 5 | 1 | 0 | 151 | | |
| Hardcourt win–loss | 0–1 | 0–1 | 0–1 | 0–2 | 7–3 | 10–8 | 26–9 | 23–8 | 20–9 | 30–10 | 21–11 | 29–5 | 19–9 | 43–7 | 30–12 | 38–12 | 29–13 | 28–14 | 30–15 | 26–16 | 31–13 | 37–15 | 35–13 | 27–15 | 22–16 | 26–18 | 33–14 | 24–16 | 14–18 | 3–13 | 56 / 361 | 661–317 | 68% |
| Clay win–loss | 0–0 | 0–0 | 0–0 | 0–0 | 0–1 | 4–1 | 1–2 | 5–2 | 6–2 | 6–1 | 5–2 | 4–3 | 10–3 | 11–5 | 15–3 | 15–5 | 12–4 | 13–4 | 13–5 | 12–5 | 21–2 | 18–2 | 11–4 | 14–4 | 8–6 | 16–3 | 3–7 | 7–6 | 5–8 | 3–5 | 23 / 113 | 238–95 | 71% |
| Grass win–loss | 0–0 | 0–0 | 0–0 | 0–0 | 0–0 | 1–3 | 4–2 | 5–2 | 3–3 | 5–3 | 5–2 | 6–2 | 5–1 | 7–2 | 7–1 | 8–3 | 0–0 | 6–2 | 7–1 | 10–0 | 6–1 | 3–2 | 3–2 | 6–2 | 3–3 | 6–3 | 5–3 | 5–3 | 2–4 | 0–3 | 8 / 61 | 118–53 | 69% |
| Carpet win–loss | 0–0 | 0–0 | 0–0 | 0–0 | 0–0 | 0–0 | 4–5 | 1–2 | 3–4 | 4–3 | 0–1 | 2–1 | 6–2 | 6–2 | 6–1 | 2–1 | 2–1 | 3–0 | 5–0 | 1–0 | discontinued | | | | | | | | | | 4 / 22 | 45–23 | 66% |
| Overall win–loss | 0–1 | 0–1 | 0–1 | 0–2 | 7–4 | 15–12 | 35–18 | 34–14 | 32–18 | 45–17 | 31–16 | 41–11 | 40–15 | 67–16 | 58–17 | 63–21 | 43–18 | 50–20 | 55–21 | 49–21 | 58–16 | 58–19 | 49–19 | 47–21 | 33–25 | 48–24 | 41–24 | 36–25 | 21–30 | 6–21 | 91 / 557 | 1062–488 | 69% |
| Win % | 0% | 0% | 0% | 0% | 64% | 56% | 66% | 71% | 64% | 73% | 66% | 79% | 73% | 81% | 77% | 75% | 70% | 71% | 72% | 70% | 78% | 75% | 72% | 69% | 57% | 67% | 63% | 59% | 41% | 22% | 69% | | |
| Year-end ranking | 739 | 510 | 389 | 285 | 117 | 75 | 10 | 11 | 18 | 7 | 27 | 13 | 10 | 2 | 7 | 1 | 8 | 5 | 3 | 2 | 3 | 3 | 3 | 5 | 25 | 4 | 18 | 15 | 56 | 204 | | | |

=== Mixed doubles ===
| Tournament | 1996 | 1997 | 1998 | 1999 | 2000 | 2001 | 2002 | 2003 | 2004 | 2005 | 2006 | 2007 | 2008 | 2009 | 2010 | 2011 | 2012 | 2013 | 2014 | 2015 | 2016 | 2017 | 2018 | SR | W–L | Win % |
|---|---|---|---|---|---|---|---|---|---|---|---|---|---|---|---|---|---|---|---|---|---|---|---|---|---|---|
Grand Slam tournaments
| Australian Open | 2R | 1R | A | A | A | A | A | 2R | 1R | QF | F | W | 1R | QF | 2R | W | A | A | W | F | A | A | A | 3 / 13 | 29–9 | 76% |
| French Open | A | A | A | A | A | A | A | 1R | 2R | 2R | F | 1R | 1R | 2R | 1R | 1R | 1R | F | QF | 2R | A | 1R | A | 0 / 14 | 14–14 | 50% |
| Wimbledon | A | A | 3R | A | A | A | A | 2R | 3R | A | QF | SF | QF | 3R | 3R | SF | QF | W | SF | QF | 2R | 3R | A | 1 / 15 | 29–14 | 67% |
| US Open | A | QF | 1R | A | A | A | A | F | SF | 2R | 1R | 1R | 1R | 2R | SF | 2R | 1R | SF | 1R | A | A | A | A | 0 / 14 | 18–14 | 56% |
| Win–loss | 1–1 | 2–2 | 2–2 | 0–0 | 0–0 | 0–0 | 0–0 | 6–4 | 5–4 | 4–3 | 10–4 | 8–3 | 2–4 | 5–4 | 5–3 | 8–3 | 2–3 | 12–2 | 10–3 | 7–3 | 0–1 | 1–2 | 0–0 | 4 / 56 | 90–51 | 64% |

== Partnerships ==
=== Partners in men's doubles ===
| No. | Partner | Years |
|---|---|---|
| 1. | (Canada) Robert Janecek | 1989, 1990 |
| 2. | (Canada) Chris Pridham | 1989, 1991, 1992 |
| 3. | (Canada) Greg Rusedski | 1991, 1994 |
| 4. | **(Canada) Sébastien Lareau** | 1991–1994, 1998–2000 |
| 5. | (Germany) Christian Saceanu | 1992 |
| 6. | (Canada) Glenn Michibata | 1992 |
| 7. | (Australia) Peter Tramacchi | 1992 |
| 8. | (Canada) Martin Laurendeau | 1992, 1993 |
| 9. | (Kenya) Paul Wekesa | 1992 |
| 10. | (Italy) Andrea Gaudenzi | 1992 |
| 11. | (United Kingdom) Neil Broad | 1993 |
| 12. | (Australia) Michael Tebbutt | 1994 |
| 13. | (United States) Doug Flach | 1994 |
| 14. | (Canada) Albert Chang | 1994 |
| 15. | (Venezuela) Maurice Ruah | 1994 |
| 16. | **(India) Leander Paes** | 1994, 2013, 2015 |
| 17. | (United States) Mike Bauer | 1994 |
| 18. | (United States) Alex O'Brien | 1994 |
| 19. | (United States) John Sullivan | 1994 |
| 20. | (South Africa) Grant Stafford | 1994 |
| 21. | **(The Bahamas) Mark Knowles** | 1994–2007 |
| 22. | (United States) Kenny Thorne | 1994 |
| 23. | (Canada) Grant Connell | 1995–1997 |
| 24. | (Sweden) Anders Järryd | 1996 |
| 25. | (United States) Brian MacPhie | 1997 |
| 26. | (United States) Justin Gimelstob | 1997 |
| 27. | (Czech Republic) Cyril Suk | 1997 |
| 28. | (Netherlands) Jacco Eltingh | 1998 |
| 29. | (Netherlands) Paul Haarhuis | 1999, 2000 |
| 30. | (Canada) Jocelyn Robichaud | 1999 |
| 31. | **(Belarus) Max Mirnyi** | 2000, 2011, 2012, 2017 |
| 32. | **(Zimbabwe) Kevin Ullyett** | 2000 |
| 33. | **(Australia) Sandon Stolle** | 2001 |
| 34. | **(Federal Republic of Yugoslavia) / (Serbia) Nenad Zimonjić** | 2001, 2007–2010, 2012, 2014 |
| 35. | (Canada) Frédéric Niemeyer | 2002–2005, 2007–2009 |
| 36. | (Canada) Simon Larose | 2002, 2003 |
| 37. | (Zimbabwe) Wayne Black | 2005 |
| 38. | (Canada) Frank Dancevic | 2006, 2010, 2014 |
| 39. | (Australia) Paul Hanley | 2008 |
| 40. | (Canada) Milos Raonic | 2010, 2012, 2017 |
| 41. | (Canada) Vasek Pospisil | 2011–2018 |
| 42. | (India) Mahesh Bhupathi | 2013 |
| 43. | (Poland) Łukasz Kubot | 2013, 2015 |
| 44. | (Sweden) Robert Lindstedt | 2013, 2018 |
| 45. | (Austria) Julian Knowle | 2013, 2015 |
| 46. | **(Poland) Mariusz Fyrstenberg** | 2014 |
| 47. | (Canada) Adil Shamasdin | 2014, 2015 |
| 48. | **(India) Rohan Bopanna** | 2014–2016 |
| 49. | (Austria) Alexander Peya | 2015 |
| 50. | (United Kingdom) Andy Murray | 2015 |
| 51. | **(France) Édouard Roger-Vasselin** | 2015–2017 |
| 52. | (Czech Republic) Radek Štěpánek | 2016 |
| 53. | (Brazil) Marcelo Melo | 2016 |
| 54. | (United Kingdom) Jamie Murray | 2016 |
| 55. | (Pakistan) Aisam-ul-Haq Qureshi | 2016, 2017 |
| 56. | **(United Kingdom) Dominic Inglot** | 2016, 2017 |
| 57. | (France) Fabrice Martin | 2017 |
| 58. | (United States) Brian Baker | 2017 |
| 59. | (Poland) Marcin Matkowski | 2017 |
| 60. | (United States) Steve Johnson | 2017, 2018 |
| 61. | (United States) John Isner | 2017 |
| 62. | (Austria) Philipp Oswald | 2018 |
| 63. | (United States) Donald Young | 2018 |
| 64. | (Israel) Jonathan Erlich | 2018 |
| 65. | (United Kingdom) Neal Skupski | 2018 |
| 66. | (Romania) Florin Mergea | 2018 |
| 67. | (Uzbekistan) Denis Istomin | 2018 |
| 68. | (Brazil) Marcelo Demoliner | 2018 |
| 69. | (Croatia) Ivo Karlović | 2018 |
| 70. | (United States) James Cerretani | 2018 |
| 71. | (France) Jérémy Chardy | 2018 |
| 72. | (Germany) Philipp Kohlschreiber | 2018 |
| 73. | (Canada) Denis Shapovalov | 2018 |
| 74. | (Austria) Jürgen Melzer | 2018 |
| 75. | (United States) Mackenzie McDonald | 2018 |
| 76. | (United States) Bradley Klahn | 2018 |

=== Partners in mixed doubles ===
| No. | Partner | Years |
|---|---|---|
| 1. | (Canada) Rene Simpson | 1996, 1997 |
| 2. | (France) Nathalie Tauziat | 1997, 1998 |
| 3. | (Ukraine) Elena Tatarkova | 1998 |
| 4. | (Netherlands) Kristie Boogert | 2003 |
| 5. | (Chinese Taipei) Janet Lee | 2003 |
| 6. | (Canada) Sonya Jeyaseelan | 2003 |
| 7. | (Russia) Lina Krasnoroutskaya | 2003, 2004 |
| 8. | (Spain) Arantxa Sánchez Vicario | 2004 |
| 9. | (Australia) Rennae Stubbs | 2004, 2005 |
| 10. | **(Russia) Elena Likhovtseva** | 2005–2008 |
| 11. | (China) Zheng Jie | 2008 |
| 12. | (Chinese Taipei) Chuang Chia-jung | 2008, 2016 |
| 13. | (Canada) Aleksandra Wozniak | 2009 |
| 14. | (Russia) Elena Vesnina | 2009 |
| 15. | (India) Sania Mirza | 2009 |
| 16. | (Slovakia) Daniela Hantuchová | 2010 |
| 17. | (Switzerland) Patty Schnyder | 2010 |
| 18. | (United States) Bethanie Mattek-Sands | 2010 |
| 19. | **(Slovenia) Katarina Srebotnik** | 2011 |
| 20. | (United States) Vania King | 2011 |
| 21. | (Chinese Taipei) Chan Yung-jan | 2011 |
| 22. | (Russia) Nadia Petrova | 2012 |
| 23. | (Germany) Julia Görges | 2012 |
| 24. | **(France) Kristina Mladenovic** | 2013–2015 |
| 25. | (Russia) Alla Kudryavtseva | 2017 |
| 26. | (Slovenia) Andreja Klepač | 2017 |

*Won titles with partners in bold

== Awards ==
- 1997 – Tennis Canada male player of the year
- 2000 – Tennis Canada male player of the year
- 2001 – Tennis Canada male player of the year
- 2002 – ATP Doubles Team of the Year
- 2002 – ITF Doubles World Champion
- 2003 – Tennis Canada male player of the year
- 2004 – ATP Doubles Team of the Year
- 2004 – Tennis Canada male player of the year
- 2005 – Tennis Canada male player of the year
- 2007 – Tennis Canada male player of the year
- 2008 – ATP Doubles Team of the Year
- 2008 – ITF Doubles World Champion
- 2008 – Tennis Canada male player of the year
- 2009 – Tennis Canada male player of the year
- 2010 – Tennis Canada male player of the year
- 2012 – Davis Cup Commitment Award

== Wins over top-10 players ==
| No. | Opponent | Rank | Event | Surface | Round | Score | DN Rank |
|---|---|---|---|---|---|---|---|
1992
| 1. | (Sweden) Stefan Edberg | 1 | Davis Cup, Vancouver, Canada | Carpet (i) | 1R | 4–6, 6–3, 1–6, 6–3, 6–4 | 238 |
1996
| 2. | (United States) Andre Agassi | 6 | Indianapolis, United States | Hard | 2R | 1–6, 3–2 def. | 140 |
| 3. | (Austria) Thomas Muster | 2 | Toronto, Canada | Hard | 2R | 6–3, 7–5 | 123 |
1997
| 4. | (Sweden) Thomas Enqvist | 7 | Miami, United States | Hard | 2R | 7–6^{(11–9)}, 6–3 | 115 |

== See also ==
- List of Canadian sports personalities

Awards
| Preceded by (Sweden) Jonas Björkman and (Australia) Todd Woodbridge (United States) Bob and Mike Bryan | ITF Doubles World Champion; 2002 (with (The Bahamas) Mark Knowles); 2008 (with (Serbia) Nenad Zimonjić) | Succeeded by (United States) Bob and Mike Bryan (United States) Bob and Mike Bryan |
| Preceded by (Sweden) Jonas Björkman and (Australia) Todd Woodbridge (United States) Bob and Mike Bryan (United States) Bob and Mike Bryan | ATP Doubles Team of the Year; 2002 (with (The Bahamas) Mark Knowles); 2004 (with (The Bahamas) Mark Knowles); 2008 (with (Serbia) Nenad Zimonjić) | Succeeded by (United States) Bob and Mike Bryan (United States) Bob and Mike Bryan (United States) Bob and Mike Bryan |
