= 1995 Thriftway ATP Championships – Singles =

Singles
- 1995 Thriftway ATP Championships

Final
- Champion: (United States) Andre Agassi
- Runner-up: (United States) Michael Chang
- Score: 7–5, 6–2

Details
- Draw: 56
- Seeds: 16

Events
Singles	Doubles
← 1994 ·	Thriftway ATP Championships	· 1996 →

Andre Agassi defeated the two-time defending champion Michael Chang in the final, 7–5, 6–2 to win the singles tennis title at the 1995 Cincinnati Masters.

== Seeds ==
1. (United States) Andre Agassi (champion)
2. (United States) Pete Sampras (quarterfinals)
3. (Germany) Boris Becker (second round)
4. (United States) Michael Chang (final)
5. (Russia) Yevgeny Kafelnikov (second round)
6. (Croatia) Goran Ivanišević (quarterfinals)
7. (South Africa) Wayne Ferreira (third round)
8. (Germany) Michael Stich (semifinals)
9. (Spain) Sergi Bruguera (second round)
10. (Netherlands) Richard Krajicek (first round)
11. (United States) Jim Courier (quarterfinals)
12. (Sweden) Stefan Edberg (first round)
13. (Sweden) Thomas Enqvist (semifinals)
14. (Ukraine) Andriy Medvedev (second round)
15. (United States) Todd Martin (third round)
16. (Spain) Alberto Berasategui (third round)

== Draw ==
=== Key ===
- Q = Qualifier
- WC = Wild card
- LL = Lucky loser
- Alt = Alternate
- SE = Special exempt
- PR = Protected ranking
- ITF = ITF entry
- JE = Junior exempt
- w/o = Walkover
- r = Retired
- d = Defaulted
- SR = Special ranking

=== Finals ===
Semifinals
1	(United States) Andre Agassi	6	6
13	(Sweden) Thomas Enqvist	4	2
4	(United States) Michael Chang	4	6	7^{7}
8	(Germany) Michael Stich	6	2	6^{5}

Final
1	(United States) Andre Agassi	7	6
4	(United States) Michael Chang	5	2

=== Top half ===
==== Section 1 ====
First round
(Czech Republic) D Vacek	6^{4}	6	6
Q	(France) J Golmard	7^{7}	4	4
(Czech Republic) M Damm	6	5	4
(Sweden) J Björkman	2	7	6
(France) G Forget	5	6	4
16	(Spain) A Berasategui	7	4	6
9	(Spain) S Bruguera	7^{8}	4	6
(Zimbabwe) B Black	6^{6}	6	2
(Italy) R Furlan	6	7^{7}
WC	(Sweden) M Wilander	4	6^{4}
(Germany) M-K Goellner	6^{5}	3
(France) O Delaître	7^{7}	6

Second round
1	(United States) A Agassi	7^{7}	6
(Czech Republic) D Vacek	6^{5}	1
(Sweden) J Björkman	0	6	5
16	(Spain) A Berasategui	6	1	7
9	(Spain) S Bruguera	2	4
(Italy) R Furlan	6	6
(France) O Delaître	3	2
7	(South Africa) W Ferreira	6	6

Third round
1	(United States) A Agassi	6	0	6
16	(Spain) A Berasategui	0	6	2
(Italy) R Furlan	7^{7}	4	7^{7}
7	(South Africa) W Ferreira	6^{2}	6	6^{5}

Quarterfinals
1	(United States) A Agassi	6	6
(Italy) R Furlan	3	4

==== Section 2 ====
First round
Q	(Denmark) K Carlsen	3	6^{3}
(Netherlands) J Siemerink	6	7^{7}
(United States) D Wheaton	6	7^{7}
(Spain) Á Corretja	1	6^{4}
(Sweden) A Järryd	1	1
13	(Sweden) T Enqvist	6	6
12	(Sweden) S Edberg	3	1
Q	(Australia) S Stolle	6	6
(Chile) M Ríos	3	3
(New Zealand) B Steven	6	6
(France) A Boetsch	2	3
(United States) R Reneberg	6	6

Second round
3	(Germany) B Becker	5	6^{7}
(Netherlands) J Siemerink	7	7^{9}
(United States) D Wheaton	2	6^{4}
13	(Sweden) T Enqvist	6	7^{7}
Q	(Australia) S Stolle	6^{5}	2
(New Zealand) B Steven	7^{7}	6
(United States) R Reneberg	5	4
6	(Croatia) G Ivanišević	7	6

Third round
(Netherlands) J Siemerink	2	3
13	(Sweden) T Enqvist	6	6
(New Zealand) B Steven	4	4
6	(Croatia) G Ivanišević	6	6

Quarterfinals
13	(Sweden) T Enqvist	4	6	6
6	(Croatia) G Ivanišević	6	0	3

=== Bottom half ===
==== Section 3 ====
First round
(United States) J Stark	5	1
(Germany) B Karbacher	7	6
(France) C Pioline	2	6	4
(United States) V Spadea	6	3	6
(United States) J Palmer	3	2
11	(United States) J Courier	6	6
14	(Ukraine) A Medvedev	6	6
Q	(United States) T Ho	1	2
(Russia) A Chesnokov	3	6^{5}
(Australia) P Rafter	6	7^{7}
Q	(France) L Roux	2	2
Q	(United States) A O'Brien	6	6

Second round
5	(Russia) Y Kafelnikov	4	5
(Germany) B Karbacher	6	7
(United States) V Spadea	5	6^{7}
11	(United States) J Courier	7	7^{9}
14	(Ukraine) A Medvedev	6	1	6^{5}
(Australia) P Rafter	4	6	7^{7}
Q	(United States) A O'Brien	6	4	1
4	(United States) M Chang	4	6	6

Third round
(Germany) B Karbacher	5	2
11	(United States) J Courier	7	6
(Australia) P Rafter	5	1
4	(United States) M Chang	7	6

Quarterfinals
11	(United States) J Courier	6	6^{6}	5
4	(United States) M Chang	3	7^{8}	7

==== Section 4 ====
First round
(United States) M Washington	6^{8}	4
(Australia) T Woodbridge	7^{10}	6
(United States) P McEnroe	6	6
Q	(United States) J Grabb	2	3
(United Kingdom) G Rusedski	7^{7}	6
10	(Netherlands) R Krajicek	6^{4}	3
15	(United States) T Martin	6	6
(Peru) J Yzaga	3	4
(Australia) M Woodforde	7^{7}	6
(Australia) J Stoltenberg	6^{5}	3
(United States) A Krickstein	2	1
(Czech Republic) P Korda	6	6

Second round
8	(Germany) M Stich	2	7	6
(Australia) T Woodbridge	6	5	3
(United States) P McEnroe	6	3	7^{8}
(United Kingdom) G Rusedski	3	6	6^{6}
15	(United States) T Martin	6	6
(Australia) M Woodforde	3	0
(Czech Republic) P Korda	3	6^{3}
2	(United States) P Sampras	6	7^{7}

Third round
8	(Germany) M Stich	7^{7}	6
(United States) P McEnroe	6^{5}	3
15	(United States) T Martin	7^{7}	4	6^{4}
2	(United States) P Sampras	6^{2}	6	7^{7}

Quarterfinals
8	(Germany) M Stich	6^{5}	7^{7}	6
2	(United States) P Sampras	7^{7}	6^{3}	1
