= 1995 Thriftway ATP Championships – Doubles =

Doubles
- 1995 Thriftway ATP Championships

Final
- Champions: (Australia) Todd Woodbridge (Australia) Mark Woodforde
- Runners-up: (The Bahamas) Mark Knowles (Canada) Daniel Nestor
- Score: 6–2, 3–0, retired

Events
Singles	Doubles
← 1994 ·	Cincinnati Masters	· 1996 →

Alex O'Brien and Sandon Stolle were the defending champions, but lost in second round to Mark Knowles and Daniel Nestor.

Todd Woodbridge and Mark Woodforde won the title. They were leading 6–2, 3–0 to Mark Knowles and Daniel Nestor until the latter were forced to retire.

== Seeds ==
The first four seeds received a bye into the second round.

1. (Australia) Todd Woodbridge / (Australia) Mark Woodforde (champions)
2. (Canada) Grant Connell / (United States) Patrick Galbraith (quarterfinals)
3. (Russia) Yevgeny Kafelnikov / (Russia) Andrei Olhovskiy (second round)
4. (Zimbabwe) Byron Black / (United States) Jonathan Stark (semifinals)
5. (United States) Jared Palmer / (United States) Richey Reneberg (quarterfinals)
6. (United States) Jim Grabb / (United States) Patrick McEnroe (first round)
7. (The Bahamas) Mark Knowles / (Canada) Daniel Nestor (final, retired)
8. (United States) Tommy Ho / (New Zealand) Brett Steven (second round)

== Draw ==
=== Key ===
- Q = Qualifier
- WC = Wild card
- LL = Lucky loser
- Alt = Alternate
- SE = Special exempt
- PR = Protected ranking
- ITF = ITF entry
- JE = Junior exempt
- w/o = Walkover
- r = Retired
- d = Defaulted
- SR = Special ranking

=== Finals ===
Semifinals
1	(Australia) Todd Woodbridge (Australia) Mark Woodforde	7	6
WC	(Australia) Mark Philippoussis (Australia) Patrick Rafter	6	3
4	(Zimbabwe) Byron Black (United States) Jonathan Stark	2	6	6
7	(The Bahamas) Mark Knowles (Canada) Daniel Nestor	6	4	7

Final
1	(Australia) Todd Woodbridge (Australia) Mark Woodforde	6	3
7	(The Bahamas) Mark Knowles (Canada) Daniel Nestor	2	0^{r}

=== Top half ===
First round
(Sweden) J Björkman (United States) T Martin	6	6
WC	(United States) S Davis (Croatia) G Ivanišević	3	4
WC	(South Africa) W Ferreira (Germany) M Stich	4	7	6
(United States) R Leach (United States) S Melville	6	6	4
(South Africa) D Adams (Czech Republic) M Damm	4	7	2
8	(United States) T Ho (New Zealand) B Steven	6	5	6
(Czech Republic) P Korda (Czech Republic) C Suk	6	2	6
WC	(Australia) M Philippoussis (Australia) P Rafter	2	6	7
(United States) T Kronemann (Australia) D Macpherson	6	6	5
(United Kingdom) N Broad (South Africa) P Norval	7	3	7
(South Africa) E Ferreira (Netherlands) J Siemerink	6	6
6	(United States) J Grabb (United States) P McEnroe	1	4

Second round
1	(Australia) T Woodbridge (Australia) M Woodforde	6	6	6
(Sweden) J Björkman (United States) T Martin	4	7	3
WC	(South Africa) W Ferreira (Germany) M Stich	6	6	6
8	(United States) T Ho (New Zealand) B Steven	7	4	1
3	(Russia) Y Kafelnikov (Russia) A Olhovskiy	0	4
WC	(Australia) M Philippoussis (Australia) P Rafter	6	6
(United Kingdom) N Broad (South Africa) P Norval	4	6	3
(South Africa) E Ferreira (Netherlands) J Siemerink	6	4	6

Quarterfinals
1	(Australia) T Woodbridge (Australia) M Woodforde	7	4	6
WC	(South Africa) W Ferreira (Germany) M Stich	6	6	3
WC	(Australia) M Philippoussis (Australia) P Rafter	6	6	7
(South Africa) E Ferreira (Netherlands) J Siemerink	4	7	5

Semifinals
1	(Australia) T Woodbridge (Australia) M Woodforde	7	6
WC	(Australia) M Philippoussis (Australia) P Rafter	6	3

=== Bottom half ===
First round
5	(United States) J Palmer (United States) R Reneberg	6	6
(France) G Forget (Germany) MK Goellner	3	3
LL	(United States) M Keil (Sweden) P Nyborg	4	6	6
Q	(France) A Boetsch (United States) V Spadea	6	3	4
(United States) L Jensen (United States) M Jensen	4	6
Q	(Zimbabwe) W Black (Canada) S Lareau	6	7
7	(The Bahamas) M Knowles (Canada) D Nestor	7	6	6
(Australia) J Fitzgerald (Sweden) A Järryd	6	7	3
(United States) A O'Brien (Australia) S Stolle	3
(Germany) B Becker (Czech Republic) D Vacek	4	r
(South Africa) L Bale (South Africa) JL de Jager	6	4	6
(France) O Delaître (United States) D Wheaton	4	6	4

Second round
5	(United States) J Palmer (United States) R Reneberg	7	6
LL	(United States) M Keil (Sweden) P Nyborg	5	3
Q	(Zimbabwe) W Black (Canada) S Lareau	6	4
4	(Zimbabwe) B Black (United States) J Stark	7	6
7	(The Bahamas) M Knowles (Canada) D Nestor	6	3	6
(United States) A O'Brien (Australia) S Stolle	2	6	3
(South Africa) L Bale (South Africa) JL de Jager	2	4
2	(Canada) G Connell (United States) P Galbraith	6	6

Quarterfinals
5	(United States) J Palmer (United States) R Reneberg	4	4
4	(Zimbabwe) B Black (United States) J Stark	6	6
7	(The Bahamas) M Knowles (Canada) D Nestor	7	2	6
2	(Canada) G Connell (United States) P Galbraith	5	6	4

Semifinals
4	(Zimbabwe) B Black (United States) J Stark	2	6	6
7	(The Bahamas) M Knowles (Canada) D Nestor	6	4	7
