= 2008 Tennis Masters Cup – Doubles =

Doubles
- 2008 Tennis Masters Cup

Final
- Champions: (Canada) Daniel Nestor (Serbia) Nenad Zimonjić
- Runners-up: (United States) Bob Bryan (United States) Mike Bryan
- Score: 7–6^{(7–3)}, 6–2

Events
Singles	Doubles
← 2007 ·	Tennis Masters Cup	· 2009 →

Defending champion Daniel Nestor and his partner Nenad Zimonjić defeated Bob and Mike Bryan in the final, 7–6^{(7–3)}, 6–2 to win the doubles tennis title at the 2008 Tennis Masters Cup.

Mark Knowles and Nestor were the reigning champions, but did not compete together. Knowles partnered Mahesh Bhupathi, but they were eliminated in the round-robin stage.

== Seeds ==
1. (United States) Bob Bryan / (United States) Mike Bryan (final)
2. (Canada) Daniel Nestor / (Serbia) Nenad Zimonjić (champions)
3. (India) Mahesh Bhupathi / (The Bahamas) Mark Knowles (round robin)
4. (Sweden) Jonas Björkman / (Zimbabwe) Kevin Ullyett (round robin)
5. (South Africa) Jeff Coetzee / (South Africa) Wesley Moodie (round robin)
6. (Czech Republic) Lukáš Dlouhý / (India) Leander Paes (round robin)
7. (Poland) Mariusz Fyrstenberg / (Poland) Marcin Matkowski (semifinals)
8. (Uruguay) Pablo Cuevas / (Peru) Luis Horna (semifinals)

== Draw ==
=== Key ===
- Q = Qualifier
- WC = Wild card
- LL = Lucky loser
- Alt = Alternate
- SE = Special exempt
- PR = Protected ranking
- ITF = ITF entry
- JE = Junior exempt
- w/o = Walkover
- r = Retired
- d = Defaulted
- SR = Special ranking

=== Finals ===
Semifinals
1	(United States) Bob Bryan (United States) Mike Bryan	6	6
7	(Poland) Mariusz Fyrstenberg (Poland) Marcin Matkowski	4	4
2	(Canada) Daniel Nestor (Serbia) Nenad Zimonjić	6	6
8	(Uruguay) Pablo Cuevas (Peru) Luis Horna	1	3

Final
1	(United States) Bob Bryan (United States) Mike Bryan	6^{3}	2
2	(Canada) Daniel Nestor (Serbia) Nenad Zimonjić	7^{7}	6

=== Red group ===
		(United States) Bryan (United States) Bryan	(India) Bhupathi (The Bahamas) Knowles	(South Africa) Coetzee (South Africa) Moodie	(Uruguay) Cuevas (Peru) Horna	RR; W–L	Set; W–L	Game; W–L	Standings
1	(United States) Bob Bryan (United States) Mike Bryan		7–5, 3–6, [10–4]	2–6, 6–2, [10–12]	6–1, 7–6^{(7–4)}	2–1	5–3	32–27	1
3	(India) Mahesh Bhupathi (The Bahamas) Mark Knowles	5–7, 6–3, [4–10]		6–2, 6–3	7–6^{(7–3)}, 6–7^{(4–7)}, [5–10]	1–2	4–4	36–30	3
5	(South Africa) Jeff Coetzee (South Africa) Wesley Moodie	6–2, 2–6, [12–10]	2–6, 3–6		2–6, 7–6^{(7–2)}, [9–11]	1–2	3–5	23–33	4
8	(Uruguay) Pablo Cuevas (Peru) Luis Horna	1–6, 6–7^{(4–7)}	6–7^{(3–7)}, 7–6^{(7–4)}, [10–5]	6–2, 6–7^{(2–7)}, [11–9]		2–1	4–4	34–35	2

Standings are determined by: 1. number of wins; 2. number of matches; 3. in two-players-ties, head-to-head records; 4. in three-players-ties, percentage of sets won, or of games won; 5. steering-committee decision.

=== Gold group ===
		(Canada) Nestor (Serbia) Zimonjić	(Sweden) Björkman (Zimbabwe) Ullyett	(Czech Republic) Dlouhý (India) Paes	(Poland) Fyrstenberg (Poland) Matkowski	RR; W–L	Set; W–L	Game; W–L	Standings
2	(Canada) Daniel Nestor (Serbia) Nenad Zimonjić		6–1, 6–4	6–1, 6–4	7–6^{(7–4)}, 5–7, [10–4]	3–0	6–1	37–23	1
4	(Sweden) Jonas Björkman (Zimbabwe) Kevin Ullyett	1–6, 4–6		6–3, 7–5	2–6, 6–1, [6–10]	1–2	3–4	26–28	3
6	(Czech Republic) Lukáš Dlouhý (India) Leander Paes	1–6, 4–6	3–6, 5–7		6–7^{(2–7)}, 3–6	0–3	0–6	22–38	4
7	(Poland) Mariusz Fyrstenberg (Poland) Marcin Matkowski	6–7^{(4–7)}, 7–5, [4–10]	6–2, 1–6, [10–6]	7–6^{(7–2)}, 6–3		2–1	5–3	34–30	2

Standings are determined by: 1. number of wins; 2. number of matches; 3. in two-players-ties, head-to-head records; 4. in three-players-ties, percentage of sets won, or of games won; 5. steering-committee decision.
