= 2007 Tennis Masters Cup – Doubles =

Doubles
- 2007 Tennis Masters Cup

Final
- Champions: (The Bahamas) Mark Knowles (Canada) Daniel Nestor
- Runners-up: (Sweden) Simon Aspelin (Austria) Julian Knowle
- Score: 6–2, 6–3

Details
- Draw: 8

Events
Singles	Doubles
← 2006 ·	Tennis Masters Cup	· 2008 →

Mark Knowles and Daniel Nestor defeated Simon Aspelin and Julian Knowle in the final, 6–2, 6–3 to win the doubles tennis title at the 2007 Tennis Masters Cup.

Jonas Björkman and Max Mirnyi were the defending champions, but were eliminated in the round-robin stage.

Though the Bob and Mike Bryan qualified as the top team, they withdrew before the event due to an elbow injury to Mike.

== Seeds ==
1. (The Bahamas) Mark Knowles / (Canada) Daniel Nestor (champions)
2. (Australia) Paul Hanley / (Zimbabwe) Kevin Ullyett (semifinals)
3. (Sweden) Simon Aspelin / (Austria) Julian Knowle (final)
4. (Czech Republic) Martin Damm / (India) Leander Paes (semifinals)
5. (Czech Republic) Lukáš Dlouhý / (Czech Republic) Pavel Vízner (round robin)
6. (Sweden) Jonas Björkman / (Belarus) Max Mirnyi (round robin)
7. (France) Arnaud Clément / (France) Michaël Llodra (round robin)
8. (Israel) Jonathan Erlich / (Israel) Andy Ram (round robin)

== Draw ==
=== Key ===
- Q = Qualifier
- WC = Wild card
- LL = Lucky loser
- Alt = Alternate
- SE = Special exempt
- PR = Protected ranking
- ITF = ITF entry
- JE = Junior exempt
- w/o = Walkover
- r = Retired
- d = Defaulted
- SR = Special ranking

=== Finals ===
Semifinals
3	(Sweden) Simon Aspelin (Austria) Julian Knowle	6	6
4	(Czech Republic) Martin Damm (India) Leander Paes	4	4
2	(Australia) Paul Hanley (Zimbabwe) Kevin Ullyett	3	7^{10}	[5]
1	(The Bahamas) Mark Knowles (Canada) Daniel Nestor	6	6^{8}	[10]

Final
3	(Sweden) Simon Aspelin (Austria) Julian Knowle	2	3
1	(The Bahamas) Mark Knowles (Canada) Daniel Nestor	6	6

=== Red group ===
		(The Bahamas) Knowles (Canada) Nestor	(Sweden) Aspelin (Austria) Knowle	(Czech Republic) Dlouhý (Czech Republic) Vízner	(France) Clément (France) Llodra	RR; W–L	Set; W–L	Game; W–L	Standings
1	(The Bahamas) Mark Knowles (Canada) Daniel Nestor		6–3, 7–5	3–6, 6–4, [9–11]	2–6, 7–5, [10–5]	2–1	5–3	32–30	2
3	(Sweden) Simon Aspelin (Austria) Julian Knowle	3–6, 5–7		7–6^{(7–1)}, 6–2	7–6^{(7–3)}, 7–6^{(7–5)}	2–1	4–2	35–33	1
5	(Czech Republic) Lukáš Dlouhý (Czech Republic) Pavel Vízner	6–3, 4–6, [11–9]	6–7^{(1–7)}, 2–6		3–6, 6–3, [10–5]	2–1	4–4	29–31	3
7	(France) Arnaud Clément (France) Michaël Llodra	6–2, 5–7, [5–10]	6–7^{(3–7)}, 6–7^{(5–7)}	6–3, 3–6, [5–10]		0–3	2–6	32–34	4

Standings are determined by: 1. number of wins; 2. number of matches; 3. in two-players-ties, head-to-head records; 4. in three-players-ties, percentage of sets won, or of games won; 5. steering-committee decision.

=== Gold group ===
		(Australia) Hanley (Zimbabwe) Ullyett	(Czech Republic) Damm (India) Paes	(Sweden) Björkman (Belarus) Mirnyi	(Israel) Erlich (Israel) Ram	RR; W–L	Set; W–L	Game; W–L	Standings
2	(Australia) Paul Hanley (Zimbabwe) Kevin Ullyett		6–3, 6–4	7–6^{(7–3)}, 6–4	6–7^{(1–7)}, 6–3, [12–14]	2–1	5–2	37–28	1
4	(Czech Republic) Martin Damm (India) Leander Paes	3–6, 4–6		6–4, 6–1	6–4, 7–5	2–1	4–2	32–26	2
6	(Sweden) Jonas Björkman (Belarus) Max Mirnyi	6–7^{(3–7)}, 4–6	4–6, 1–6		6–4, 3–6, [10–7]	1–2	2–5	25–35	3
8	(Israel) Jonathan Erlich (Israel) Andy Ram	7–6^{(7–1)}, 3–6, [14–12]	4–6, 5–7	4–6, 6–3, [7–10]		1–2	3–5	30–35	4

Standings are determined by: 1. number of wins; 2. number of matches; 3. in two-players-ties, head-to-head records; 4. in three-players-ties, percentage of sets won, or of games won; 5. steering-committee decision.
