= Nenad Zimonjić career statistics =

Career finals
| Discipline | Type | Won | Lost | Total | WR |
Doubles
| Doubles | Grand Slam | 3 | 4 | 7 | 0.43 |
| Doubles | ATP Finals | 2 | 1 | 3 | 0.67 |
| Doubles | ATP 1000 | 15 | 13 | 28 | 0.54 |
| Doubles | ATP 500 | 17 | 8 | 25 | 0.68 |
| Doubles | ATP 250 | 17 | 11 | 28 | 0.61 |
| Doubles | Olympics | – | – | – | – |
| Doubles | Total | 54 | 37 | 91 | 0.59 |
Mixed doubles
| Mixed doubles | Grand Slam | 5 | 5 | 10 | 0.50 |
| Mixed doubles | Olympics | – | – | – | – |
| Mixed doubles | Total | 5 | 5 | 10 | 0.50 |
| Mixed doubles | Total | 59 | 42 | 101 | 0.58 |

This is a list of the career statistics of Serbian former professional tennis player Nenad Zimonjić. All statistics are sourced from the ATP World Tour and International Tennis Federation websites.

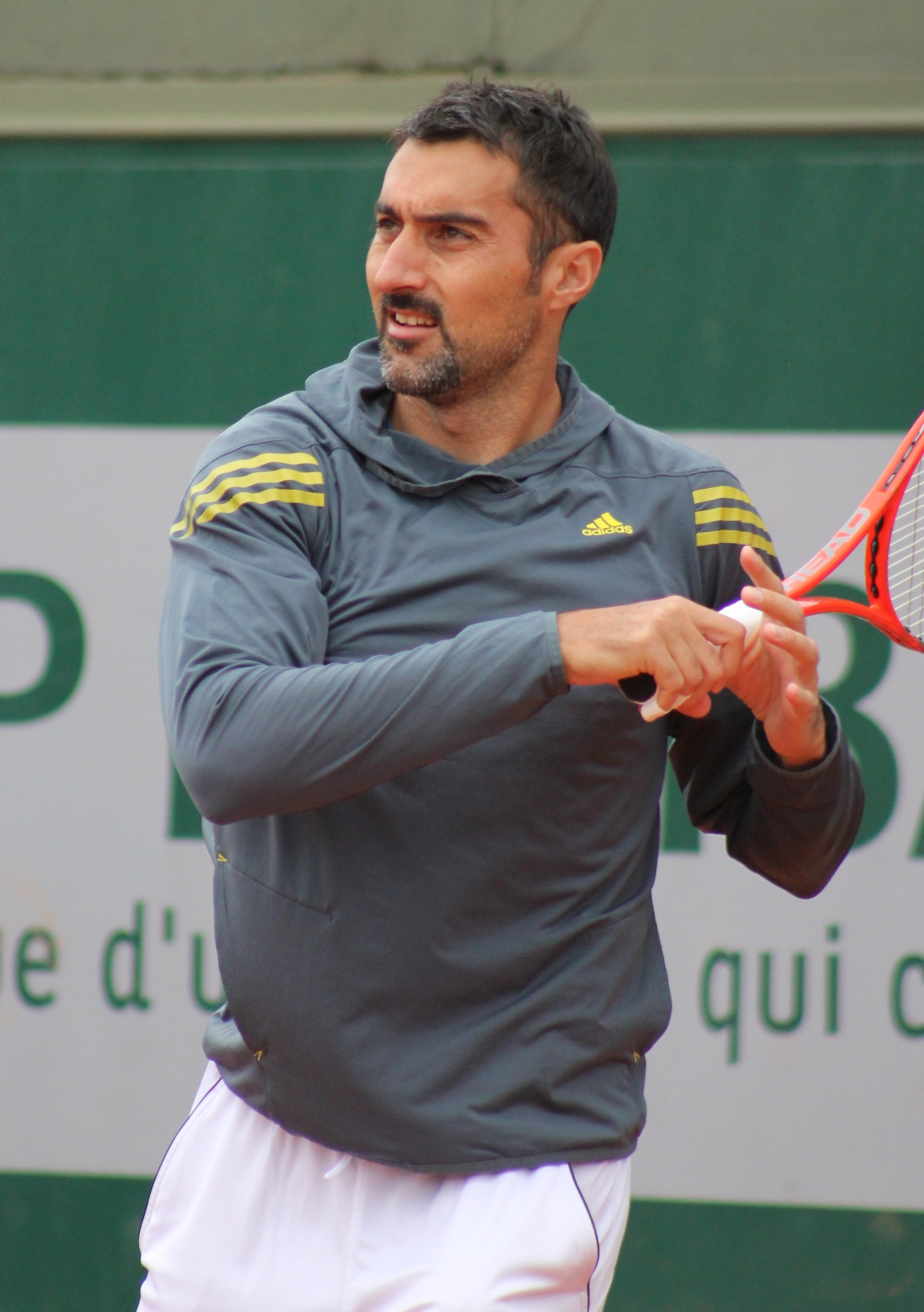
Nenad Zimonjić

== Performance timelines ==
Key
| W | F | SF | QF | #R | RR | Q# | P# | DNQ | A | Z# | PO | G | S | B | NMS | NTI | P | NH |

(W) winner; (F) finalist; (SF) semifinalist; (QF) quarterfinalist; (#R) rounds 4, 3, 2, 1; (RR) round-robin stage; (Q#) qualification round; (P#) preliminary round; (DNQ) did not qualify; (A) absent; (Z#) Davis/Fed Cup Zonal Group (with number indication) or (PO) play-off; (G) gold, (S) silver or (B) bronze Olympic/Paralympic medal; (NMS) not a Masters tournament; (NTI) not a Tier I tournament; (P) postponed; (NH) not held; (SR) strike rate (events won / competed); (W–L) win–loss record.
To avoid confusion and double counting, these charts are updated at the conclusion of a tournament or when the player's participation has ended.

=== Singles ===
| Tournament | 1999 | 2000 | 2001 | 2002 | 2003 | 2004 | 2005 | 2006 | 2007 | 2008 | 2009 | 2010 | 2011 | 2012 | 2013 | 2014 | 2015 | 2016 | 2017 | 2018 | 2019 | 2020 | 2021 | 2022 | SR | W–L | Win % |
|---|---|---|---|---|---|---|---|---|---|---|---|---|---|---|---|---|---|---|---|---|---|---|---|---|---|---|---|
Grand Slam tournaments
| Australian Open | Q1 | Q2 | 1R | Q2 | Q1 | Absent | | | | | | | | | | | | | | | | | | | 0 / 1 | 0–1 | 0% |
| French Open | Absent | | Q1 | Absent | | | | | | | | | | | | | | | | | | | | | 0 / 0 | 0–0 | - |
| Wimbledon | 3R | Q1 | Q2 | Q1 | Absent | | Q1 | Q1 | Q1 | Absent | | | | | | | | | | | | | | | 0 / 1 | 2–1 | 67% |
| US Open | Q1 | A | Q2 | Q2 | Absent | | | | | | | | | | | | | | | | | | | | 0 / 0 | 0–0 | - |
| Win–loss | 2–1 | 0–0 | 0–1 | 0–0 | 0–0 | 0–0 | 0–0 | 0–0 | 0–0 | 0–0 | 0–0 | 0–0 | 0–0 | 0–0 | 0–0 | 0–0 | 0–0 | 0–0 | 0–0 | 0–0 | 0–0 | 0–0 | 0–0 | 0–0 | 0 / 2 | 2–2 | 50% |

=== Doubles ===
| | FR Yugoslavia | | | | | | | | | (Serbia and Montenegro) FRY | | | Serbia | | | | | | | | | | | | | | | | | | |
| Tournament | 1995 | 1996 | 1997 | 1998 | 1999 | 2000 | 2001 | 2002 | 2003 | 2004 | 2005 | 2006 | 2007 | 2008 | 2009 | 2010 | 2011 | 2012 | 2013 | 2014 | 2015 | 2016 | 2017 | 2018 | 2019 | 2020 | 2021 | 2022 | SR | W–L | Win% |
Grand Slam tournaments
| Australian Open | A | A | A | A | 1R | 1R | SF | 2R | 1R | 2R | 3R | 1R | QF | QF | 2R | F | QF | 3R | 2R | SF | 3R | A | 2R | 1R | A | A | A | A | 0 / 19 | 35–19 | 65% |
| French Open | A | A | A | A | A | 1R | 1R | A | 2R | 2R | QF | 1R | SF | F | SF | W | SF | QF | 2R | QF | QF | 3R | SF | A | A | A | A | A | 1 / 17 | 44–16 | 73% |
| Wimbledon | A | A | A | A | 1R | 1R | 3R | 3R | 3R | F | QF | F | SF | W | W | 2R | SF | 1R | QF | QF | QF | 3R | A | A | A | NH | A | A | 2 / 18 | 51–16 | 76% |
| US Open | A | A | Q2 | A | 3R | 3R | 3R | 3R | 1R | 2R | 1R | QF | 2R | 3R | QF | 3R | 3R | 1R | 2R | 3R | QF | 1R | A | A | A | A | A | A | 0 / 18 | 28–18 | 61% |
| Win–loss | 0–0 | 0–0 | 0–0 | 0–0 | 2–3 | 2–4 | 8–4 | 5–3 | 3–4 | 8–4 | 8–4 | 10–4 | 12–4 | 16–3 | 14–3 | 14–3 | 13–4 | 5–4 | 6–4 | 12–4 | 11–4 | 4–3 | 5–2 | 0–1 | 0–0 | 0–0 | 0–0 | 0–0 | 3 / 72 | 158–69 | 70% |
Year-end championship
| ATP Finals | Did not qualify | | | | | | | | | | F | RR | DNQ | W | RR | W | RR | DNQ | | RR | RR | Did not qualify | | | | | | | 2 / 8 | 16–14 | 53% |
National representation
| Olympics^{1} | NH | A | Not Held | | | 1R | Not Held | | | A | Not Held | | | 1R | Not Held | | | QF | Not Held | | | 2R | Not Held | | | | A | NH | 0 / 4 | 3–4 | 43% |
| Davis Cup | Z3 | Z2 | Z2 | Z2 | A | Z3 | Z2 | Z2 | Z2 | Z1 | Z1 | PO | PO | 1R | 1R | W | SF | QF | F | 1R | QF | QF | SF | A | A | NH | A | A | 1 / 10 | 30–19 | 61% |
| Win–loss | 5–0 | 2–0 | 1–1 | 1–0 | 0–0 | 0–1 | 0–1 | 1–0 | 2–1 | 2–0 | 1–1 | 1–1 | 2–0 | 2–1 | 2–0 | 1–3 | 2–1 | 2–3 | 2–2 | 0–2 | 1–1 | 1–3 | 2–1 | 0–0 | 0–0 | 0–0 | 0–0 | 0–0 | 1 / 14 | 33–23 | 59% |
ATP World Tour Masters 1000
| Indian Wells | A | A | A | A | A | A | 2R | A | 2R | 2R | QF | QF | A | F | 1R | F | 1R | 1R | 1R | 2R | SF | SF | QF | A | A | NH | A | A | 0 / 15 | 22–15 | 59% |
| Miami | A | A | A | A | 1R | 1R | QF | A | 1R | 2R | 1R | 2R | SF | 1R | 1R | 2R | QF | QF | QF | QF | 1R | 1R | 1R | 1R | A | NH | A | A | 0 / 19 | 16–19 | 46% |
| Monte Carlo | A | A | A | A | A | 1R | 1R | 2R | A | W | W | F | 2R | 2R | W | W | 2R | SF | W | SF | SF | 2R | 1R | A | A | NH | A | A | 5 / 17 | 31–12 | 72% |
| Madrid | Not Held | | | | | | | 1R | A | 1R | F | QF | 2R | QF | W | F | F | 2R | 1R | W | F | QF | 1R | A | A | NH | A | A | 2 / 15 | 23–13 | 64% |
| Rome | A | A | A | A | A | A | 1R | A | A | 2R | QF | QF | W | F | W | 2R | QF | QF | 2R | W | 2R | 2R | A | A | A | A | A | A | 3 / 14 | 20–11 | 65% |
| Canada | A | A | A | A | A | A | A | 1R | 1R | 2R | 2R | QF | 2R | W | SF | QF | W | QF | 1R | SF | QF | 1R | A | A | | NH | A | A | 2 / 15 | 18–13 | 58% |
| Cincinnati | A | A | A | A | A | A | A | 1R | 1R | 1R | QF | QF | QF | SF | W | 2R | F | 1R | 2R | QF | F | 2R | A | A | A | A | A | A | 1 / 15 | 18–13 | 60% |
| Shanghai | Not Held | | | | | | | | | | | | | | 2R | QF | F | 2R | 2R | 2R | QF | QF | 2R | A | A | Not Held | | | 0 / 9 | 9–9 | 50% |
| Paris | A | A | A | A | Q1 | QF | SF | 1R | A | 1R | 1R | F | F | 2R | W | QF | QF | 2R | 2R | 2R | 2R | 1R | 1R | A | A | A | A | A | 1 / 17 | 19–16 | 54% |
| Hamburg | A | A | A | A | A | A | 2R | A | A | 2R | SF | SF | 2R | W | Not Masters Series | | | | | | | | | | | | | | 1 / 6 | 10–5 | 67% |
| Stuttgart | A | A | A | A | A | SF | QF | Discontinued | | | | | | | | | | | | | | | | | | | | | 0 / 2 | 4–2 | 67% |
| Win–loss | 0–0 | 0–0 | 0–0 | 0–0 | 0–1 | 5–4 | 7–7 | 1–5 | 1–4 | 10–8 | 12–8 | 15–9 | 13–7 | 18–7 | 21–4 | 14–8 | 17–8 | 8–9 | 9–8 | 17–7 | 13–9 | 7–8 | 2–6 | 0–1 | 0–0 | 0–0 | 0–0 | 0–0 | 15 / 144 | 190–128 | 60% |
Career statistics
| | 1995 | 1996 | 1997 | 1998 | 1999 | 2000 | 2001 | 2002 | 2003 | 2004 | 2005 | 2006 | 2007 | 2008 | 2009 | 2010 | 2011 | 2012 | 2013 | 2014 | 2015 | 2016 | 2017 | 2018 | 2019 | 2020 | 2021 | 2022 | Career | | |
| Tournaments | 0 | 0 | 0 | 2 | 14 | 23 | 20 | 17 | 23 | 26 | 22 | 22 | 22 | 23 | 25 | 25 | 23 | 24 | 23 | 23 | 25 | 24 | 28 | 9 | 9 | 1 | 1 | 0 | 454 | | |
| Titles | 0 | 0 | 0 | 0 | 1 | 2 | 1 | 1 | 2 | 1 | 2 | 3 | 5 | 5 | 9 | 7 | 4 | 3 | 3 | 4 | 0 | 0 | 1 | 0 | 0 | 0 | 0 | 0 | 54 | | |
| Finals | 0 | 0 | 0 | 0 | 2 | 3 | 3 | 1 | 4 | 3 | 5 | 6 | 7 | 8 | 11 | 11 | 8 | 4 | 4 | 6 | 4 | 0 | 1 | 0 | 0 | 0 | 0 | 0 | 91 | | |
| Overall W–L | 0–0 | 2–0 | 1–1 | 1–2 | 14–12 | 32–21 | 33–20 | 20–15 | 31–21 | 32–24 | 33–22 | 43–21 | 49–18 | 49–18 | 61–17 | 59–23 | 50–22 | 38–26 | 31–22 | 48–22 | 41–28 | 15–25 | 25–27 | 1–9 | 0–9 | 0–1 | 0–1 | 0–0 | 710–427 | | |
| Year-end rank | 361 | 248 | 195 | 125 | 86 | 29 | 21 | 51 | 32 | 18 | 11 | 11 | 5 | 1 | 3 | 3 | 6 | 20 | 14 | 3 | 15 | 61 | 35 | 461 | 405 | 460 | 1241 | – | 62.45% | | |

^{1} 2020 Summer Olympics is postponed to 2021 due to COVID-19 pandemic.

=== Mixed doubles ===
| Tournament | 1999 | 2000 | 2001 | 2002 | 2003 | 2004 | 2005 | 2006 | 2007 | 2008 | 2009 | 2010 | 2011 | 2012 | 2013 | 2014 | 2015 | 2016 | 2017 | 2018 | 2019 | 2020 | 2021 | 2022 | SR |
|---|---|---|---|---|---|---|---|---|---|---|---|---|---|---|---|---|---|---|---|---|---|---|---|---|---|
Grand Slam tournaments
| Australian Open | A | A | QF | A | A | W | 2R | 1R | 2R | W | 1R | 1R | SF | A | 2R | 1R | 1R | A | A | A | A | A | A | A | 2 / 12 |
| French Open | A | A | 1R | A | A | SF | 2R | W | F | F | 1R | W | F | 2R | QF | F | 1R | 2R | A | A | A | NH | A | A | 2 / 14 |
| Wimbledon | 2R | 1R | A | 1R | QF | A | 3R | QF | 1R | 2R | 2R | 3R | 3R | SF | SF | W | 3R | 3R | 1R | A | A | NH | A | A | 1 / 17 |
| US Open | A | A | 1R | A | 1R | QF | F | 2R | 1R | QF | QF | 2R | 1R | 1R | 2R | 1R | 2R | SF | 2R | A | A | NH | A | A | 0 / 16 |
| SR | 0 / 1 | 0 / 1 | 0 / 3 | 0 / 1 | 0 / 2 | 1 / 3 | 0 / 4 | 1 / 4 | 0 / 4 | 1 / 4 | 0 / 4 | 1 / 4 | 0 / 4 | 0 / 3 | 0 / 4 | 1 / 4 | 0 / 4 | 0 / 3 | 0 / 2 | 0 / 0 | 0 / 0 | 0 / 0 | 0 / 0 | 0 / 0 | 5 / 59 |

== Grand Slam tournaments ==
=== Men's doubles: 7 (3 titles, 4 runner-ups) ===
| Outcome | Year | Tournament | Surface | Partner | Opponents | Score |
|---|---|---|---|---|---|---|
| Runner-up | 2004 | Wimbledon | Grass | (Austria) Julian Knowle | (Sweden) Jonas Björkman (Australia) Todd Woodbridge | 1–6, 4–6, 6–4, 4–6 |
| Runner-up | 2006 | Wimbledon | Grass | (France) Fabrice Santoro | (United States) Bob Bryan (United States) Mike Bryan | 3–6, 6–4, 4–6, 2–6 |
| Runner-up | 2008 | French Open | Clay | (Canada) Daniel Nestor | (Uruguay) Pablo Cuevas (Peru) Luis Horna | 2–6, 3–6 |
| Winner | 2008 | Wimbledon | Grass | (Canada) Daniel Nestor | (Sweden) Jonas Björkman (Zimbabwe) Kevin Ullyett | 7–6^{(14–12)}, 6–7^{(6–8)}, 6–3, 6–3 |
| Winner | 2009 | Wimbledon (2) | Grass | (Canada) Daniel Nestor | (United States) Bob Bryan (United States) Mike Bryan | 7–6^{(9–7)}, 6–7^{(3–7)}, 7–6^{(7–3)}, 6–3 |
| Runner-up | 2010 | Australian Open | Hard | (Canada) Daniel Nestor | (United States) Bob Bryan (United States) Mike Bryan | 3–6, 7–6^{(7–5)}, 3–6 |
| Winner | 2010 | French Open | Clay | (Canada) Daniel Nestor | (Czech Republic) Lukáš Dlouhý (India) Leander Paes | 7–5, 6–2 |

=== Mixed doubles: 10 (5 titles, 5 runner-ups) ===
| Outcome | Year | Tournament | Surface | Partner | Opponents | Score |
|---|---|---|---|---|---|---|
| Winner | 2004 | Australian Open | Hard | (Russia) Elena Bovina | (United States) Martina Navratilova (India) Leander Paes | 6–1, 7–6^{(7–3)} |
| Runner-up | 2005 | US Open | Hard | (Slovenia) Katarina Srebotnik | (Slovakia) Daniela Hantuchová (India) Mahesh Bhupathi | 4–6, 2–6 |
| Winner | 2006 | French Open | Clay | (Slovenia) Katarina Srebotnik | (Russia) Elena Likhovtseva (Canada) Daniel Nestor | 6–3, 6–4 |
| Runner-up | 2007 | French Open | Clay | (Slovenia) Katarina Srebotnik | (France) Nathalie Dechy (Israel) Andy Ram | 5–7, 3–6 |
| Winner | 2008 | Australian Open (2) | Hard | (China) Sun Tiantian | (India) Sania Mirza (India) Mahesh Bhupathi | 7–6^{(7–4)}, 6–4 |
| Runner-up | 2008 | French Open | Clay | (Slovenia) Katarina Srebotnik | (Belarus) Victoria Azarenka (United States) Bob Bryan | 2–6, 6–7^{(4–7)} |
| Winner | 2010 | French Open (2) | Clay | (Slovenia) Katarina Srebotnik | (Kazakhstan) Yaroslava Shvedova (Austria) Julian Knowle | 4–6, 7–6^{(7–5)}, [11–9] |
| Runner-up | 2011 | French Open | Clay | (Slovenia) Katarina Srebotnik | (Australia) Casey Dellacqua (United States) Scott Lipsky | 6–7^{(6–8)}, 6–4, [7–10] |
| Runner-up | 2014 | French Open | Clay | (Germany) Julia Görges | (Germany) Anna-Lena Grönefeld (Netherlands) Jean-Julien Rojer | 6–4, 2–6, [7–10] |
| Winner | 2014 | Wimbledon | Grass | (Australia) Samantha Stosur | (Chinese Taipei) Chan Hao-ching (Belarus) Max Mirnyi | 6–4, 6–2 |

== Year–end championships ==
=== Doubles: 3 (2 titles, 1 runner-up) ===
| Outcome | Year | Championship | Surface | Partner | Opponent | Score |
|---|---|---|---|---|---|---|
| Runner-up | 2005 | Shanghai | Hard (i) | (India) Leander Paes | (France) Michaël Llodra (France) Fabrice Santoro | 7–6^{(8–6)}, 3–6, 6–7^{(4–7)} |
| Winner | 2008 | Shanghai | Hard (i) | (Canada) Daniel Nestor | (United States) Bob Bryan (United States) Mike Bryan | 7–6^{(7–3)}, 6–2 |
| Winner | 2010 | London | Hard (i) | (Canada) Daniel Nestor | (India) Mahesh Bhupathi (Belarus) Max Mirnyi | 7–6^{(8–6)}, 6–4 |

== ATP Tour finals ==
=== Doubles: 91 (54 titles, 37 runner-ups) ===
| Legend Grand Slam tournaments (3–4) Tennis Masters Cup / ATP World Tour Finals (2–1) ATP Masters Series / ATP World Tour Masters 1000 (15–13) ATP International Series Gold / ATP World Tour 500 Series (17–8) ATP International Series / ATP World Tour 250 Series (17–11) | Titles by surface Hard (31–19) Clay (16–12) Grass (4–4) Carpet (3–2) | Titles by setting Outdoor (34–28) Indoor (20–9) |

| Result | W–L | Date | Tournament | Tier | Surface | Partner | Opponents | Score |
|---|---|---|---|---|---|---|---|---|
| Loss | 0–1 | Feb 1999 | Pacific Coast Championships, US | World Series | Hard (i) | (North Macedonia) Aleksandar Kitinov | (Australia) Todd Woodbridge (Australia) Mark Woodforde | 5–7, 7–6^{(7–3)}, 4–6 |
| Win | 1–1 | May 1999 | Delray Beach Open, US | World Series | Clay | (Belarus) Max Mirnyi | (United States) Doug Flach (United States) Brian MacPhie | 7–6^{(7–3)}, 3–6, 6–3 |
| Win | 2–1 | Mar 2000 | Delray Beach Open, US (2) | International | Hard | (United States) Brian MacPhie | (Australia) Joshua Eagle (Australia) Andrew Florent | 7–5, 6–4 |
| Loss | 2–2 | May 2000 | Bavarian Championships, Germany | International | Clay | (Belarus) Max Mirnyi | (South Africa) David Adams (South Africa) John-Laffnie de Jager | 4–6, 4–6 |
| Win | 3–2 | Oct 2000 | Vienna Open, Austria | Intl. Gold | Hard (i) | (Russia) Yevgeny Kafelnikov | (Czech Republic) Jiří Novák (Czech Republic) David Rikl | 6–4, 6–4 |
| Loss | 3–3 | Mar 2001 | Dubai Tennis Championships, UAE | Intl. Gold | Hard | (Canada) Daniel Nestor | (Australia) Joshua Eagle (Australia) Sandon Stolle | 4–6, 4–6 |
| Loss | 3–4 | Apr 2001 | Estoril Open, Portugal | International | Clay | (United States) Donald Johnson | (Czech Republic) Radek Štěpánek (Czech Republic) Michal Tabara | 4–6, 1–6 |
| Win | 4–4 | Oct 2001 | Grand Prix de Tennis de Lyon, France | International | Carpet (i) | (Canada) Daniel Nestor | (France) Arnaud Clément (France) Sébastien Grosjean | 6–1, 6–2 |
| Win | 5–4 | Feb 2002 | U.S. National Indoor Tennis Championships, US | Intl. Gold | Hard (i) | (United States) Brian MacPhie | (United States) Bob Bryan (United States) Mike Bryan | 6–3, 3–6, [10–4] |
| Win | 6–4 | Mar 2003 | Delray Beach Open, US (3) | International | Hard | (India) Leander Paes | (Netherlands) Raemon Sluiter (Netherlands) Martin Verkerk | 7–5, 3–6, 7–5 |
| Loss | 6–5 | May 2003 | Valencia Open, Spain | International | Clay | (United States) Brian MacPhie | (Argentina) Lucas Arnold Ker (Argentina) Mariano Hood | 1–6, 7–6^{(9–7)}, 4–6 |
| Loss | 6–6 | May 2003 | St. Pölten Grand Prix, Austria | International | Clay | (Armenia) Sargis Sargsian | (Sweden) Simon Aspelin (Italy) Massimo Bertolini | 4–6, 7–6^{(10–8)}, 3–6 |
| Win | 7–6 | Oct 2003 | St. Petersburg Open, Russia | International | Hard (i) | (Austria) Julian Knowle | (Germany) Michael Kohlmann (Germany) Rainer Schüttler | 7–6^{(7–1)}, 6–3 |
| Win | 8–6 | Apr 2004 | Monte-Carlo Masters, Monaco | Masters | Clay | (United Kingdom) Tim Henman | (Argentina) Gastón Etlis (Argentina) Martín Rodríguez | 7–5, 6–2 |
| Loss | 8–7 | May 2004 | Bavarian Championships, Germany | International | Clay | (Austria) Julian Knowle | (United States) James Blake (The Bahamas) Mark Merklein | 2–6, 4–6 |
| Loss | 8–8 | Jul 2004 | Wimbledon, London, UK | Grand Slam | Grass | (Austria) Julian Knowle | (Sweden) Jonas Björkman (Australia) Todd Woodbridge | 1–6, 4–6, 6–4, 4–6 |
| Win | 9–8 | Apr 2005 | Monte-Carlo Masters, Monaco (2) | Masters | Clay | (India) Leander Paes | (United States) Bob Bryan (United States) Mike Bryan | Walkover |
| Win | 10–8 | Apr 2005 | Barcelona Open, Spain | Intl. Gold | Clay | (India) Leander Paes | (Spain) Feliciano López (Spain) Rafael Nadal | 6–3, 6–3 |
| Loss | 10–9 | Oct 2005 | Stockholm Open, Sweden | International | Hard (i) | (India) Leander Paes | (Australia) Wayne Arthurs (Australia) Paul Hanley | 3–6, 3–6 |
| Loss | 10–10 | Oct 2005 | Madrid Open, Spain | Masters | Hard (i) | (India) Leander Paes | (The Bahamas) Mark Knowles (Canada) Daniel Nestor | 6–3, 3–6, 2–6 |
| Loss | 10–11 | Nov 2005 | Tennis Masters Cup, Shanghai, China | Masters Cup | Carpet (i) | (India) Leander Paes | (France) Michaël Llodra (France) Fabrice Santoro | 7–6^{(8–6)}, 3–6, 6–7^{(4–7)} |
| Win | 11–11 | Jan 2006 | Sydney International, Australia | International | Hard | (France) Fabrice Santoro | (Czech Republic) František Čermák (Czech Republic) Leoš Friedl | 6–1, 6–4 |
| Loss | 11–12 | Apr 2006 | Monte-Carlo Masters, Monaco | Masters | Clay | (France) Fabrice Santoro | (Sweden) Jonas Björkman (Belarus) Max Mirnyi | 2–6, 6–7^{(2–7)} |
| Win | 12–12 | Jun 2006 | Halle Open, Germany | International | Grass | (France) Fabrice Santoro | (Germany) Michael Kohlmann (Germany) Rainer Schüttler | 6–0, 6–4 |
| Loss | 12–13 | Jul 2006 | Wimbledon, London, UK | Grand Slam | Grass | (France) Fabrice Santoro | (United States) Bob Bryan (United States) Mike Bryan | 3–6, 6–4, 4–6, 2–6 |
| Win | 13–13 | Oct 2006 | Kremlin Cup, Russia | International | Carpet (i) | (France) Fabrice Santoro | (Czech Republic) František Čermák (Czech Republic) Jaroslav Levinský | 6–1, 7–5 |
| Loss | 13–14 | Nov 2006 | Paris Masters, France | Masters | Carpet (i) | (France) Fabrice Santoro | (France) Arnaud Clément (France) Michaël Llodra | 6–7^{(4–7)}, 2–6 |
| Win | 14–14 | Jan 2007 | Qatar Open, Qatar | International | Hard | (Russia) Mikhail Youzhny | (Czech Republic) Martin Damm (India) Leander Paes | 6–1, 7–6^{(7–3)} |
| Win | 15–14 | Mar 2007 | Dubai Tennis Championships, UAE | Intl. Gold | Hard | (France) Fabrice Santoro | (India) Mahesh Bhupathi (Czech Republic) Radek Štěpánek | 7–5, 6–7^{(3–7)}, [10–7] |
| Win | 16–14 | May 2007 | Italian Open, Italy | Masters | Clay | (France) Fabrice Santoro | (United States) Bob Bryan (United States) Mike Bryan | 6–4, 6–7^{(4–7)}, [10–7] |
| Loss | 16–15 | Jun 2007 | Halle Open, Germany | International | Grass | (France) Fabrice Santoro | (Sweden) Simon Aspelin (Austria) Julian Knowle | 4–6, 6–7^{(5–7)} |
| Win | 17–15 | Aug 2007 | Connecticut Open, US | International | Hard | (India) Mahesh Bhupathi | (Poland) Mariusz Fyrstenberg (Poland) Marcin Matkowski | 6–3, 6–3 |
| Win | 18–15 | Oct 2007 | St. Petersburg Open, Russia (2) | International | Carpet (i) | (Canada) Daniel Nestor | (Austria) Jürgen Melzer (Australia) Todd Perry | 6–1, 7–6^{(7–3)} |
| Loss | 18–16 | Nov 2007 | Paris Masters, France | Masters | Hard (i) | (Canada) Daniel Nestor | (United States) Bob Bryan (United States) Mike Bryan | 3–6, 6–7^{(4–7)} |
| Loss | 18–17 | Mar 2008 | Indian Wells Masters, US | Masters | Hard | (Canada) Daniel Nestor | (Israel) Jonathan Erlich (Israel) Andy Ram | 4–6, 4–6 |
| Loss | 18–18 | May 2008 | Italian Open, Italy | Masters | Clay | (Canada) Daniel Nestor | (United States) Bob Bryan (United States) Mike Bryan | 6–3, 4–6, [8–10] |
| Win | 19–18 | May 2008 | Masters Series Hamburg, Germany | Masters | Clay | (Canada) Daniel Nestor | (United States) Bob Bryan (United States) Mike Bryan | 6–4, 5–7, [10–8] |
| Loss | 19–19 | Jun 2008 | French Open, Paris, France | Grand Slam | Clay | (Canada) Daniel Nestor | (Uruguay) Pablo Cuevas (Peru) Luis Horna | 2–6, 3–6 |
| Win | 20–19 | Jun 2008 | Queen's Club Championships, UK | International | Grass | (Canada) Daniel Nestor | (Brazil) Marcelo Melo (Brazil) André Sá | 6–4, 7–6^{(7–3)} |
| Win | 21–19 | Jul 2008 | Wimbledon, London, UK | Grand Slam | Grass | (Canada) Daniel Nestor | (Sweden) Jonas Björkman (Zimbabwe) Kevin Ullyett | 7–6^{(14–12)}, 6–7^{(3–7)}, 6–3, 6–3 |
| Win | 22–19 | Jul 2008 | Canadian Open, Canada | Masters | Hard | (Canada) Daniel Nestor | (United States) Bob Bryan (United States) Mike Bryan | 6–2, 4–6, [10–6] |
| Win | 23–19 | Nov 2008 | Tennis Masters Cup, Shanghai, China | Masters Cup | Hard (i) | (Canada) Daniel Nestor | (United States) Bob Bryan (United States) Mike Bryan | 7–6^{(7–3)}, 6–2 |
| Loss | 23–20 | Jan 2009 | Qatar Open, Qatar | 250 Series | Hard | (Canada) Daniel Nestor | (Spain) Marc López (Spain) Rafael Nadal | 6–4, 4–6, [8–10] |
| Loss | 23–21 | Jan 2009 | Sydney International, Australia | 250 Series | Hard | (Canada) Daniel Nestor | (United States) Bob Bryan (United States) Mike Bryan | 1–6, 6–7^{(3–7)} |
| Win | 24–21 | Feb 2009 | Rotterdam Open, Netherlands | 500 Series | Hard (i) | (Canada) Daniel Nestor | (Czech Republic) Lukáš Dlouhý (India) Leander Paes | 6–2, 7–5 |
| Win | 25–21 | Apr 2009 | Monte-Carlo Masters, Monaco (3) | Masters 1000 | Clay | (Canada) Daniel Nestor | (United States) Bob Bryan (United States) Mike Bryan | 6–4, 6–1 |
| Win | 26–21 | Apr 2009 | Barcelona Open, Spain (2) | 500 Series | Clay | (Canada) Daniel Nestor | (India) Mahesh Bhupathi (The Bahamas) Mark Knowles | 6–3, 7–6^{(11–9)} |
| Win | 27–21 | May 2009 | Italian Open, Italy (2) | Masters 1000 | Clay | (Canada) Daniel Nestor | (United States) Bob Bryan (United States) Mike Bryan | 7–6^{(7–5)}, 6–3 |
| Win | 28–21 | May 2009 | Madrid Open, Spain | Masters 1000 | Clay | (Canada) Daniel Nestor | (Sweden) Simon Aspelin (South Africa) Wesley Moodie | 6–4, 6–4 |
| Win | 29–21 | Jul 2009 | Wimbledon, London, UK (2) | Grand Slam | Grass | (Canada) Daniel Nestor | (United States) Bob Bryan (United States) Mike Bryan | 7–6^{(9–7)}, 6–7^{(3–7)}, 7–6^{(7–3)}, 6–3 |
| Win | 30–21 | Aug 2009 | Cincinnati Masters, US | Masters 1000 | Hard | (Canada) Daniel Nestor | (United States) Bob Bryan (United States) Mike Bryan | 3–6, 7–6^{(7–2)}, [15–13] |
| Win | 31–21 | Nov 2009 | Swiss Indoors, Switzerland | 500 Series | Hard (i) | (Canada) Daniel Nestor | (United States) Bob Bryan (United States) Mike Bryan | 6–2, 6–3 |
| Win | 32–21 | Nov 2009 | Paris Masters, France | Masters 1000 | Hard (i) | (Canada) Daniel Nestor | (Spain) Marcel Granollers (Spain) Tommy Robredo | 6–3, 6–4 |
| Win | 33–21 | Jan 2010 | Sydney International, Australia (2) | 250 Series | Hard | (Canada) Daniel Nestor | (United Kingdom) Ross Hutchins (Australia) Jordan Kerr | 6–3, 7–6^{(7–5)} |
| Loss | 33–22 | Jan 2010 | Australian Open, Melbourne, Australia | Grand Slam | Hard | (Canada) Daniel Nestor | (United States) Bob Bryan (United States) Mike Bryan | 3–6, 7–6^{(7–5)}, 3–6 |
| Win | 34–22 | Feb 2010 | Rotterdam Open, Netherlands (2) | 500 Series | Hard (i) | (Canada) Daniel Nestor | (Sweden) Simon Aspelin (Australia) Paul Hanley | 6–4, 4–6, [10–7] |
| Loss | 34–23 | Mar 2010 | Indian Wells Masters, US | Masters 1000 | Hard | (Canada) Daniel Nestor | (Spain) Marc López (Spain) Rafael Nadal | 6–7^{(8–10)}, 3–6 |
| Win | 35–23 | Apr 2010 | Monte-Carlo Masters, Monaco (4) | Masters 1000 | Clay | (Canada) Daniel Nestor | (India) Mahesh Bhupathi (Belarus) Max Mirnyi | 6–3, 2–0 ret. |
| Win | 36–23 | Apr 2010 | Barcelona Open, Spain (3) | 500 Series | Clay | (Canada) Daniel Nestor | (Australia) Lleyton Hewitt (The Bahamas) Mark Knowles | 4–6, 6–3, [10-6] |
| Loss | 36–24 | May 2010 | Madrid Open, Spain | Masters 1000 | Clay | (Canada) Daniel Nestor | (United States) Bob Bryan (United States) Mike Bryan | 3–6, 4–6 |
| Win | 37–24 | Jun 2010 | French Open, Paris, France | Grand Slam | Clay | (Canada) Daniel Nestor | (Czech Republic) Lukáš Dlouhý (India) Leander Paes | 7–5, 6–2 |
| Win | 38–24 | Oct 2010 | Vienna Open, Austria (2) | 250 Series | Hard (i) | (Canada) Daniel Nestor | (Poland) Mariusz Fyrstenberg (Poland) Marcin Matkowski | 7–5, 3–6, [10–5] |
| Loss | 38–25 | Nov 2010 | Swiss Indoors, Switzerland | 500 Series | Hard (i) | (Canada) Daniel Nestor | (United States) Bob Bryan (United States) Mike Bryan | 3–6, 6–3, [3–10] |
| Win | 39–25 | Nov 2010 | ATP World Tour Finals, London, UK | Tour Finals | Hard (i) | (Canada) Daniel Nestor | (India) Mahesh Bhupathi (Belarus) Max Mirnyi | 7–6^{(8–6)}, 6–4 |
| Loss | 39–26 | Feb 2011 | Rotterdam Open, Netherlands | 500 Series | Hard (i) | (France) Michaël Llodra | (Austria) Jürgen Melzer (Germany) Philipp Petzschner | 4–6, 6–3, [5–10] |
| Loss | 39–27 | May 2011 | Madrid Open, Spain | Masters 1000 | Clay | (France) Michaël Llodra | (United States) Bob Bryan (United States) Mike Bryan | 3–6, 3–6 |
| Win | 40–27 | Aug 2011 | Washington Open, US | 500 Series | Hard | (France) Michaël Llodra | (Sweden) Robert Lindstedt (Romania) Horia Tecău | 6–7^{(3–7)}, 7–6^{(8–6)}, [10–7] |
| Win | 41–27 | Aug 2011 | Canadian Open, Canada (2) | Masters 1000 | Hard | (France) Michaël Llodra | (United States) Bob Bryan (United States) Mike Bryan | 6–4, 6–7^{(5–7)}, [10–5] |
| Loss | 41–28 | Aug 2011 | Cincinnati Masters, US | Masters 1000 | Hard | (France) Michaël Llodra | (India) Mahesh Bhupathi (India) Leander Paes | 6–7^{(4–7)}, 6–7^{(2–7)} |
| Win | 42–28 | Oct 2011 | China Open, China | 500 Series | Hard | (France) Michaël Llodra | (Sweden) Robert Lindstedt (Romania) Horia Tecău | 7–6^{(7–2)}, 7–6^{(7–4)} |
| Loss | 42–29 | Oct 2011 | Shanghai Masters, China | Masters 1000 | Hard | (France) Michaël Llodra | (Belarus) Max Mirnyi (Canada) Daniel Nestor | 6–3, 1–6, [10–12] |
| Win | 43–29 | Nov 2011 | Swiss Indoors, Switzerland (2) | 500 Series | Hard (i) | (France) Michaël Llodra | (Belarus) Max Mirnyi (Canada) Daniel Nestor | 6–4, 7–5 |
| Win | 44–29 | Feb 2012 | Rotterdam Open, Netherlands (3) | 500 Series | Hard (i) | (France) Michaël Llodra | (Sweden) Robert Lindstedt (Romania) Horia Tecău | 4–6, 7–5, [16–14] |
| Win | 45–29 | Sep 2012 | St. Petersburg Open, Russia (3) | 250 Series | Hard (i) | (United States) Rajeev Ram | (Slovakia) Lukáš Lacko (Slovakia) Igor Zelenay | 6–2, 4–6, [10–6] |
| Loss | 45–30 | Oct 2012 | Stockholm Open, Sweden | 250 Series | Hard (i) | (Sweden) Robert Lindstedt | (Brazil) Marcelo Melo (Brazil) Bruno Soares | 7–6^{(7–4)}, 5–7, [6–10] |
| Win | 46–30 | Oct 2012 | Swiss Indoors, Switzerland (3) | 500 Series | Hard (i) | (Canada) Daniel Nestor | (Philippines) Treat Huey (United Kingdom) Dominic Inglot | 7–5, 6–7^{(4–7)}, [10–5] |
| Win | 47–30 | Feb 2013 | Rotterdam Open, Netherlands (4) | 500 Series | Hard (i) | (Sweden) Robert Lindstedt | (Netherlands) Thiemo de Bakker (Netherlands) Jesse Huta Galung | 5–7, 6–3, [10–8] |
| Loss | 47–31 | Mar 2013 | Dubai Tennis Championships, UAE | 500 Series | Hard | (Sweden) Robert Lindstedt | (India) Mahesh Bhupathi (France) Michaël Llodra | 6–7^{(6–8)}, 6–7^{(6–8)} |
| Win | 48–31 | Apr 2013 | Monte-Carlo Masters, Monaco (5) | Masters 1000 | Clay | (France) Julien Benneteau | (United States) Bob Bryan (United States) Mike Bryan | 4–6, 7–6^{(7–4)}, [14–12] |
| Win | 49–31 | Aug 2013 | Washington Open, US (2) | 500 Series | Hard | (France) Julien Benneteau | (United States) Mardy Fish (Czech Republic) Radek Štěpánek | 7–6^{(7–5)}, 7–5 |
| Win | 50–31 | Jan 2014 | Sydney International, Australia (3) | 250 Series | Hard | (Canada) Daniel Nestor | (India) Rohan Bopanna (Pakistan) Aisam-ul-Haq Qureshi | 7–6^{(7–3)}, 7–6^{(7–3)} |
| Loss | 50–32 | Mar 2014 | Dubai Tennis Championships, UAE | 500 Series | Hard | (Canada) Daniel Nestor | (India) Rohan Bopanna (Pakistan) Aisam-ul-Haq Qureshi | 4–6, 3–6 |
| Loss | 50–33 | Apr 2014 | Barcelona Open, Spain | 500 Series | Clay | (Canada) Daniel Nestor | (Netherlands) Jesse Huta Galung (France) Stéphane Robert | 3–6, 3–6 |
| Win | 51–33 | May 2014 | Madrid Open, Spain (2) | Masters 1000 | Clay | (Canada) Daniel Nestor | (United States) Bob Bryan (United States) Mike Bryan | 6–4, 6–2 |
| Win | 52–33 | May 2014 | Italian Open, Italy (3) | Masters 1000 | Clay | (Canada) Daniel Nestor | (Netherlands) Robin Haase (Spain) Feliciano López | 6–4, 7–6^{(7–2)} |
| Win | 53–33 | Oct 2014 | Swiss Indoors, Switzerland (4) | 500 Series | Hard (i) | (Canada) Vasek Pospisil | (Croatia) Marin Draganja (Finland) Henri Kontinen | 7–6^{(15–13)}, 1–6, [10–5] |
| Loss | 53–34 | Feb 2015 | Dubai Tennis Championships, UAE | 500 Series | Hard | (Pakistan) Aisam-ul-Haq Qureshi | (India) Rohan Bopanna (Canada) Daniel Nestor | 4–6, 1–6 |
| Loss | 53–35 | May 2015 | Madrid Open, Spain | Masters 1000 | Clay | (Poland) Marcin Matkowski | (India) Rohan Bopanna (Romania) Florin Mergea | 2–6, 7–6^{(7–5)}, [9–11] |
| Loss | 53–36 | Jun 2015 | Queen's Club Championships, UK | 500 Series | Grass | (Poland) Marcin Matkowski | (France) Pierre-Hugues Herbert (France) Nicolas Mahut | 2–6, 2–6 |
| Loss | 53–37 | Aug 2015 | Cincinnati Masters, US | Masters 1000 | Hard | (Poland) Marcin Matkowski | (Canada) Daniel Nestor (France) Édouard Roger-Vasselin | 2–6, 2–6 |
| Win | 54–37 | Feb 2017 | Sofia Open, Bulgaria | 250 Series | Hard (i) | (Serbia) Viktor Troicki | (Russia) Mikhail Elgin (Russia) Andrey Kuznetsov | 6–4, 6–4 |

== Partner performance in ATP Tour finals ==
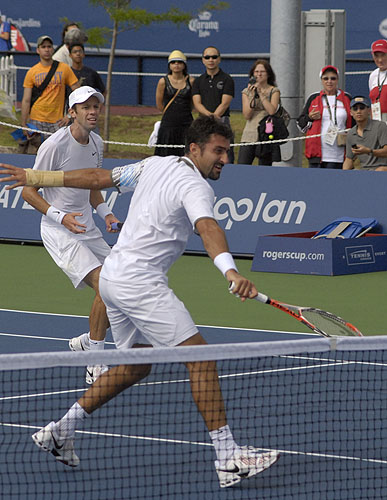
Nestor (left) and Zimonjić (right) at the 2008 Rogers Cup, a tournament they went on to win

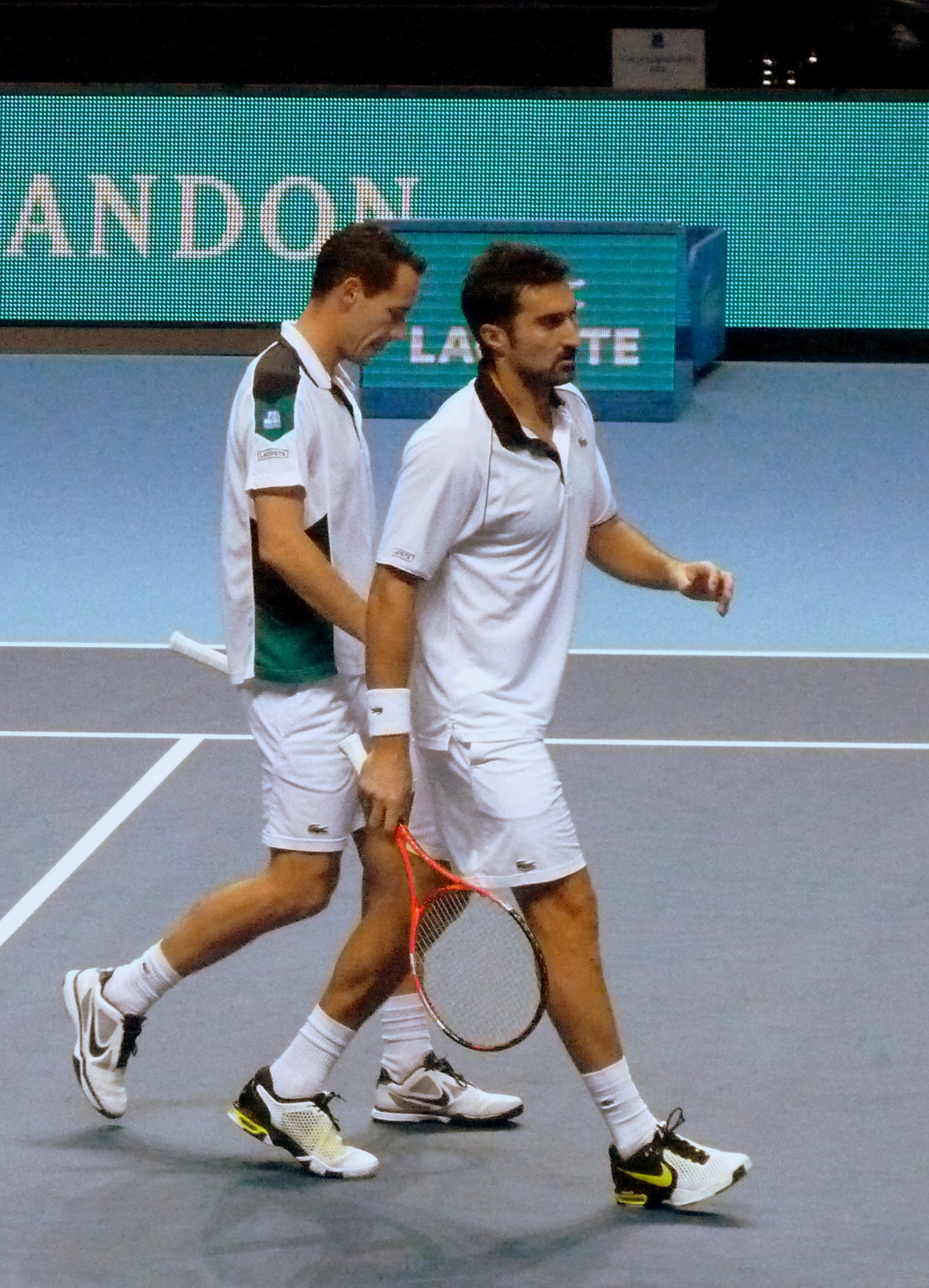
Llodra (left) and Zimonjić (right) during the 2011 ATP World Tour Finals

| Partner | Finals | W–L | Win % |
|---|---|---|---|
| (Canada) **Daniel Nestor** | 40 | 27–13 | 68% |
| (France) **Fabrice Santoro** | 9 | 5–4 | 56% |
| (France) Michaël Llodra | 9 | 5–4 | 56% |
| (India) Leander Paes | 6 | 3–3 | 50% |
| (United States) Brian MacPhie | 3 | 2–1 | 67% |
| (Austria) **Julian Knowle** | 3 | 1–2 | 33% |
| (Sweden) Robert Lindstedt | 3 | 1–2 | 33% |
| (Poland) Marcin Matkowski | 3 | 0–3 | 0% |
| (France) Julien Benneteau | 2 | 2–0 | 100% |
| (Belarus) Max Mirnyi | 2 | 1–1 | 50% |
| (Russia) Yevgeny Kafelnikov | 1 | 1–0 | 100% |
| (United Kingdom) Tim Henman | 1 | 1–0 | 100% |
| (Russia) Mikhail Youzhny | 1 | 1–0 | 100% |
| (India) Mahesh Bhupathi | 1 | 1–0 | 100% |
| (United States) Rajeev Ram | 1 | 1–0 | 100% |
| (Canada) Vasek Pospisil | 1 | 1–0 | 100% |
| (Serbia) Viktor Troicki | 1 | 1–0 | 100% |
| (North Macedonia) Aleksandar Kitinov | 1 | 0–1 | 0% |
| (United States) Donald Johnson | 1 | 0–1 | 0% |
| (Armenia) Sargis Sargsian | 1 | 0–1 | 0% |
| (Pakistan) Aisam-ul-Haq Qureshi | 1 | 0–1 | 0% |

- **Bold** = Partner with whom Zimonjić reached at least one Grand Slam final.

=== ATP Tour finals record by partner's country ===
| Country | Finals | W–L | Win % | Partners |
|---|---|---|---|---|
| Canada | 41 | 28–13 | 68% | Nestor (40), Pospisil (1) |
| France | 20 | 12–8 | 60% | Santoro (9), Llodra (9), Benneteau (2) |
| India | 7 | 4–3 | 57% | Paes (6), Bhupathi (1) |
| United States | 5 | 3–2 | 60% | MacPhie (3), Ram (1), Johnson (1) |
| Austria | 3 | 1–2 | 33% | Knowle (3) |
| Sweden | 3 | 1–2 | 33% | Lindstedt (3) |
| Poland | 3 | 0–3 | 0% | Matkowski (3) |
| Russia | 2 | 2–0 | 100% | Kafelnikov (1), Youzhny (1) |
| Belarus | 2 | 1–1 | 50% | Mirnyi (2) |
| United Kingdom | 1 | 1–0 | 100% | Henman (1) |
| Serbia | 1 | 1–0 | 100% | Troicki (1) |
| Armenia | 1 | 0–1 | 0% | Sargsian (1) |
| North Macedonia | 1 | 0–1 | 0% | Kitinov (1) |
| Pakistan | 1 | 0–1 | 0% | Qureshi (1) |

== ATP Challenger and ITF Futures finals ==
=== Singles: 5 (4 titles, 1 runner-up) ===
| Legend Challengers (4–1) Futures (0–0) | Titles by surface Hard (2–0) Clay (1–0) Carpet (1–1) | Titles by setting Outdoor (2–0) Indoor (2–1) |

| Result | W–L | Date | Tournament | Tier | Surface | Opponent | Score |
|---|---|---|---|---|---|---|---|
| Win | 1–0 | May 1998 | Kyiv, Ukraine | Challenger | Clay | (Slovakia) Ján Krošlák | 6–3, 6–3 |
| Win | 2–0 | Aug 2000 | Belo Horizonte, Brazil | Challenger | Hard | (France) Jean-François Bachelot | 6–3, 6–7^{(6–8)}, 7–5 |
| Win | 3–0 | Feb 2001 | Andrézieux, France | Challenger | Hard (i) | (Czech Republic) Jan Hernych | 7–6^{(7–5)}, 6–2 |
| Loss | 3–1 | Feb 2002 | Belgrade, FR Yugoslavia | Challenger | Carpet (i) | (Croatia) Mario Ančić | 2–6, 3–6 |
| Win | 4–1 | Feb 2004 | Belgrade, Serbia and Montenegro | Challenger | Carpet (i) | (Switzerland) Marco Chiudinelli | 2–6, 7–6^{(7–2)}, 6–4 |

=== Doubles: 7 (6 titles, 1 runner-up) ===
| Legend Challengers (6–1) Futures (0–0) | Titles by surface Hard (0–0) Clay (5–1) Carpet (1–0) | Titles by setting Outdoor (5–1) Indoor (1–0) |

| Result | W–L | Date | Tournament | Tier | Surface | Partner | Opponents | Score |
|---|---|---|---|---|---|---|---|---|
| Loss | 0–1 | Sep 1996 | Budva, FR Yugoslavia | Challenger | Clay | (Socialist Federal Republic of Yugoslavia) Dušan Vemić | (Socialist Federal Republic of Yugoslavia) Nebojša Đorđević (North Macedonia) Aleksandar Kitinov | 3–6, 2–6 |
| Win | 1–1 | Apr 1998 | Prague, Czech Republic | Challenger | Clay | (Spain) Joan Balcells | (Czech Republic) Jiří Novák (Czech Republic) Radek Štěpánek | 7–6, 7–6 |
| Win | 2–1 | Jun 1998 | Weiden, Germany | Challenger | Clay | (Portugal) Nuno Marques | (Sweden) Simon Aspelin (United States) Chris Tontz | 6–4, 3–6, 6–3 |
| Win | 3–1 | Aug 1998 | Sopot, Poland | Challenger | Clay | (New Zealand) James Greenhalgh | (Belarus) Alexander Shvec (Bulgaria) Milen Velev | 6–1, 6–3 |
| Win | 4–1 | Aug 1998 | Warsaw, Poland | Challenger | Clay | (New Zealand) James Greenhalgh | (Lebanon) Ali Hamadeh (Sweden) Johan Landsberg | Walkover |
| Win | 5–1 | Sep 1998 | Belgrade, FR Yugoslavia | Challenger | Clay | (Netherlands) Raemon Sluiter | (Lebanon) Ali Hamadeh (Sweden) Johan Landsberg | 6–4, 6–4 |
| Win | 6–1 | Feb 2003 | Belgrade, Serbia and Montenegro | Challenger | Carpet (i) | (Serbia and Montenegro) Ilija Bozoljac | (Serbia and Montenegro) Darko Mađarovski (Serbia and Montenegro) Janko Tipsarević | 6–1, 6–4 |

== National representation ==
=== Team competitions finals: 5 (4 titles, 1 runner-up) ===
| Legend Davis Cup (1–1) World Team Cup (2–0) ATP Cup (1–0) | Titles by surface Hard (2–1) Clay (2–0) | Titles by setting Outdoor (3–0) Indoor (1–1) |

| Result | W–L | Date | Team competition | Surface | Partners | Opponents | Score |
|---|---|---|---|---|---|---|---|
| Win | 1–0 | May 2009 | World Team Cup, Düsseldorf, Germany | Clay | (Serbia) Janko Tipsarević (Serbia) Viktor Troicki | (Germany) Rainer Schüttler (Germany) Philipp Kohlschreiber (Germany) Nicolas Kiefer (Germany) Mischa Zverev | 2–1 |
| Win | 2–0 | Dec 2010 | Davis Cup, Belgrade, Serbia | Hard (i) | (Serbia) Novak Djokovic (Serbia) Janko Tipsarević (Serbia) Viktor Troicki | (France) Gaël Monfils (France) Michaël Llodra (France) Arnaud Clément (France) Gilles Simon | 3–2 |
| Win | 3–0 | May 2012 | World Team Cup, Düsseldorf, Germany | Clay | (Serbia) Janko Tipsarević (Serbia) Viktor Troicki (Serbia) Miki Janković | (Czech Republic) Tomáš Berdych (Czech Republic) Radek Štěpánek (Czech Republic) František Čermák | 3–0 |
| Loss | 3–1 | Nov 2013 | Davis Cup, Belgrade, Serbia | Hard (i) | (Serbia) Novak Djokovic (Serbia) Dušan Lajović (Serbia) Ilija Bozoljac | (Czech Republic) Tomáš Berdych (Czech Republic) Radek Štěpánek (Czech Republic) Lukáš Rosol (Czech Republic) Jan Hájek | 2–3 |
| Win | 4–1 | Jan 2020 | ATP Cup, Sydney, Australia | Hard | (Serbia) Novak Djokovic (Serbia) Dušan Lajović (Serbia) Viktor Troicki (Serbia) Nikola Ćaćić (Serbia) Nikola Milojević | (Spain) Rafael Nadal (Spain) Roberto Bautista Agut (Spain) Pablo Carreño Busta (Spain) Albert Ramos Viñolas (Spain) Feliciano López | 2–1 (Note: Nenad Zimonjić served as the non-playing captain for Team Serbia.) |

== Top 10 singles wins ==
- He has a 1–4 (20%) record against players who were, at the time the match was played, ranked in the top 10.

| # | Player | Rank | Event | Surface | Rd | Score | NZ Rank |
|---|---|---|---|---|---|---|---|
2004
| 1. | (United States) Andre Agassi | 6 | St. Pölten, Austria | Clay | 1R | 6–2, 7–6^{(8–6)} | 339 |

== See also ==
- Serbia Davis Cup team
- List of male doubles tennis players
- List of ATP number 1 ranked doubles tennis players
- List of Grand Slam men's doubles champions
- List of Grand Slam mixed doubles champions
- ATP Tour records
- Sport in Serbia
