= 2011 Barcelona Open Banco Sabadell – Singles qualifying =

This article displays the qualifying draw of the 2011 Barcelona Open Banco Sabadell.

== Players ==
=== Seeds ===
1. (Finland) Jarkko Nieminen (qualified)
2. (Argentina) Máximo González (first round)
3. (Portugal) Rui Machado (qualifying competition) (lucky loser)
4. (Germany) Mischa Zverev (qualifying competition) (lucky loser)
5. (Czech Republic) Jan Hájek (qualifying competition)
6. (Turkey) Marsel İlhan (qualifying competition)
7. (Ukraine) Illya Marchenko (first round)
8. (Italy) Simone Bolelli (qualifying competition)
9. (Netherlands) Jesse Huta Galung (first round)
10. (France) Benoît Paire (qualified)
11. (Kazakhstan) Yuri Schukin (first round)
12. (Czech Republic) Lukáš Rosol (first round)
13. (Germany) Simon Greul (qualified)
14. (Poland) Łukasz Kubot (first round)

=== Qualifiers ===
1. (Finland) Jarkko Nieminen
2. (Italy) Flavio Cipolla
3. (France) Édouard Roger-Vasselin
4. (France) Vincent Millot
5. (Germany) Simon Greul
6. (France) Benoît Paire
7. (Italy) Simone Vagnozzi

=== Lucky losers ===
1. (Portugal) Rui Machado
2. (Germany) Mischa Zverev

== Qualifying draw ==
=== First qualifier ===
First round
1	(Finland) Jarkko Nieminen	6	6
WC	(Spain) Juan Lizariturry	0	1
WC	(Spain) Marc López	6	6^{1}	6
12	(Czech Republic) Lukáš Rosol	4	7	3

Qualifying competition
1	(Finland) Jarkko Nieminen	1	6	7
WC	(Spain) Marc López	6	4	6^{5}

=== Second qualifier ===
First round
2	(Argentina) Máximo González	4	4
(Italy) Flavio Cipolla	6	6
(Spain) Iván Navarro	1	3
8	(Italy) Simone Bolelli	6	6

Qualifying competition
(Italy) Flavio Cipolla	0	6	6
8	(Italy) Simone Bolelli	6	3	2

=== Third qualifier ===
First round
3	(Portugal) Rui Machado	6	6
(Argentina) Federico del Bonis	3	4
(France) Édouard Roger-Vasselin	6	7
11	(Kazakhstan) Yuri Schukin	4	5

Qualifying competition
3	(Portugal) Rui Machado	1	4
(France) Édouard Roger-Vasselin	6	6

=== Fourth qualifier ===
First round
4	(Germany) Mischa Zverev	6	6
WC	(Spain) Iñigo Cervantes-Huegun	2	2
(France) Vincent Millot	5	6	6
14	(Poland) Łukasz Kubot	7	2	2

Qualifying competition
4	(Germany) Mischa Zverev	6	5	2
(France) Vincent Millot	2	7	6

=== Fifth qualifier ===
First round
5	(Czech Republic) Jan Hájek	7	7
(Croatia) Franko Škugor	6^{5}	5
(Germany) Dominik Meffert	6	6^{4}	3
13	(Germany) Simon Greul	0	7	6

Qualifying competition
5	(Czech Republic) Jan Hájek	6	4	1
13	(Germany) Simon Greul	2	6	6

=== Sixth qualifier ===
First round
6	(Turkey) Marsel İlhan	6	6
WC	(Spain) Ignacio Coll-Riudavets	2	2
(Republic of Ireland) Conor Niland	6	0	3
10	(France) Benoît Paire	4	6	6

Qualifying competition
6	(Turkey) Marsel İlhan	6	5	6^{5}
10	(France) Benoît Paire	4	7	7

=== Seventh qualifier ===
First round
7	(Ukraine) Illya Marchenko	5	2
(Italy) Simone Vagnozzi	7	6
(Russia) Evgeny Donskoy	6^{2}	7	6
9	(Netherlands) Jesse Huta Galung	7	5	1

Qualifying competition
(Italy) Simone Vagnozzi	7	6
(Russia) Evgeny Donskoy	5	3
