= 2009 Barcelona Open Banco Sabadell – Singles =

Singles
- 2009 Barcelona Open Banco Sabadell

Final
- Champion: (Spain) Rafael Nadal
- Runner-up: (Spain) David Ferrer
- Score: 6–2, 7–5

Details
- Draw: 56 (5WC/7Q)
- Seeds: 16

Events
Singles	Doubles
← 2008 ·	Barcelona Open	· 2010 →

Four-time defending champion Rafael Nadal successfully defended his title, defeating David Ferrer in a rematch of the previous year's final, 6–2, 7–5, to win the singles title at the 2009 Barcelona Open. It was his record-extending fifth title at the Barcelona Open.

== Seeds ==
The top eight seeds receive a bye into the second round.

1. (Spain) Rafael Nadal (champion)
2. (Spain) Fernando Verdasco (quarterfinals)
3. (Russia) Nikolay Davydenko (semifinals)
4. (Spain) David Ferrer (final)
5. (Chile) Fernando González (semifinals)
6. (Spain) Tommy Robredo (quarterfinals)
7. (Argentina) David Nalbandian (quarterfinals, withdrew due to hip injury)
8. (Switzerland) Stanislas Wawrinka (third round)
9. (Czech Republic) Radek Štěpánek (quarterfinals)
10. (Spain) Nicolás Almagro (third round)
11. (Russia) Marat Safin (first round)
12. (Russia) Igor Andreev (third round)
13. (France) Richard Gasquet (second round)
14. (Sweden) Robin Söderling (second round)
15. (Czech Republic) Tomáš Berdych (third round)
16. (Spain) Feliciano López (third round)

== Draw ==
=== Key ===
- Q = Qualifier
- WC = Wild card
- LL = Lucky loser
- Alt = Alternate
- SE = Special exempt
- PR = Protected ranking
- ITF = ITF entry
- JE = Junior exempt
- w/o = Walkover
- r = Retired
- d = Defaulted
- SR = Special ranking

=== Finals ===
Quarterfinals
1	(Spain) Rafael Nadal	w/o
7	(Argentina) David Nalbandian
3	(Russia) Nikolay Davydenko	6^{4}	6	6
9	(Czech Republic) Radek Štěpánek	7	2	2
6	(Spain) Tommy Robredo	3	4
4	(Spain) David Ferrer	6	6
5/WC	(Chile) Fernando González	6	4	6
2	(Spain) Fernando Verdasco	3	6	4

Semifinals
1	(Spain) Rafael Nadal	6	6
3	(Russia) Nikolay Davydenko	3	2
4	(Spain) David Ferrer	2	6	7
5/WC	(Chile) Fernando González	6	2	6^{5}

Final
1	(Spain) Rafael Nadal	6	7
4	(Spain) David Ferrer	2	5

=== Top half ===
==== Section 1 ====
First round
Q	(Portugal) F Gil	6	6
(Chinese Taipei) Y-h Lu	2	1
(Belgium) C Rochus	6	6
(France) N Devilder	4	4
(Czech Republic) J Hernych	6	3	2
13	(France) R Gasquet	4	6	6
10	(Spain) N Almagro	3	7	2
(Romania) V Hănescu	6	6^{7}	2^{r}
(Argentina) JI Chela	6	3	6
(Brazil) T Bellucci	2	6	4
WC	(Spain) JC Ferrero	5	6^{3}
(Russia) I Kunitsyn	7	7

Second round
1	(Spain) R Nadal	6	6
Q	(Portugal) F Gil	2	2
(Belgium) C Rochus	6	6^{2}	6
13	(France) R Gasquet	1	7	3
10	(Spain) N Almagro	3	7	6
(Argentina) JI Chela	6	6^{4}	3
(Russia) I Kunitsyn	5	4
7	(Argentina) D Nalbandian	7	6

Third round
1	(Spain) R Nadal	6	6
(Belgium) C Rochus	2	0
10	(Spain) N Almagro	3	4
7	(Argentina) D Nalbandian	6	6

Quarterfinals
1	(Spain) R Nadal	w/o
7	(Argentina) D Nalbandian

==== Section 2 ====
First round
(Argentina) G Cañas	6^{0}	3
(France) A Clément	7	6
(Spain) M Granollers	6^{3}	3
Q	(Spain) S Ventura	7	6
(Finland) J Nieminen	2	1
16	(Spain) F López	6	6
9	(Czech Republic) R Štěpánek	6	2	6
(Spain) G García López	4	6	4
(Spain) A Montañés	4	6^{1}
(Serbia) J Tipsarević	6	7
(Russia) M Youzhny	6^{5}	7	6
(Serbia) V Troicki	7	6^{6}	3

Second round
3	(Russia) N Davydenko	7	6
(France) A Clément	6^{2}	2
Q	(Spain) S Ventura	6	4	3
16	(Spain) F López	2	6	6
9	(Czech Republic) R Štěpánek	7	6
(Serbia) J Tipsarević	6^{2}	0
(Russia) M Youzhny	5	1
8	(Switzerland) S Wawrinka	7	6

Third round
3	(Russia) N Davydenko	7	3	6
16	(Spain) F López	6^{8}	6	4
9	(Czech Republic) R Štěpánek	6	1	7
8	(Switzerland) S Wawrinka	4	6	5

Quarterfinals
3	(Russia) N Davydenko	6^{4}	6	6
9	(Czech Republic) R Štěpánek	7	2	2

=== Bottom half ===
==== Section 3 ====
First round
(Argentina) D Junqueira	4	6	4
WC	(Argentina) G Gaudio	6	3	6
(France) M Gicquel	3	4
WC	(Spain) A Martín	6	6
(Italy) A Seppi	3	6	5
12	(Russia) I Andreev	6	3	7
14	(Sweden) R Söderling	6	6
(Russia) T Gabashvili	1	4
(Latvia) E Gulbis	6	3	3
(Italy) P Starace	4	6	6
Q	(Spain) P Riba	2	6^{5}
Q	(Kazakhstan) M Kukushkin	6	7

Second round
6	(Spain) T Robredo	7	6
WC	(Argentina) G Gaudio	6^{6}	1
WC	(Spain) A Martín	2	2
12	(Russia) I Andreev	6	6
14	(Sweden) R Söderling	6^{5}	6	2
(Italy) P Starace	7	2	6
Q	(Kazakhstan) M Kukushkin	3	6	1
4	(Spain) D Ferrer	6	3	6

Third round
6	(Spain) T Robredo	4	6	6
12	(Russia) I Andreev	6	2	3
(Italy) P Starace	6	5	2
4	(Spain) D Ferrer	4	7	6

Quarterfinals
6	(Spain) T Robredo	3	4
4	(Spain) D Ferrer	6	6

==== Section 4 ====
First round
(Israel) D Sela	4	5
(Argentina) J Acasuso	6	7
Q	(Italy) F Fognini	1	3
Q	(Spain) D Gimeno Traver	6	6
(Argentina) J Mónaco	6	6
11/WC	(Russia) M Safin	4	1
15	(Czech Republic) T Berdych	5
(Argentina) M Vassallo Argüello	2	r
(Spain) Ó Hernández	6	6
(Argentina) E Schwank	2	4
Q	(Ecuador) N Lapentti	6	2	6
(France) P-H Mathieu	4	6	2

Second round
5/WC	(Chile) F González	6	6
(Argentina) J Acasuso	4	4
Q	(Spain) D Gimeno Traver	5	4
(Argentina) J Mónaco	7	6
15	(Czech Republic) T Berdych	6	4	6
(Spain) Ó Hernández	2	6	3
Q	(Ecuador) N Lapentti	5	3
2	(Spain) F Verdasco	7	6

Third round
5/WC	(Chile) F González	7	6
(Argentina) J Mónaco	6^{6}	3
15	(Czech Republic) T Berdych	5	7	4
2	(Spain) F Verdasco	7	5	6

Quarterfinals
5/WC	(Chile) F González	6	4	6
2	(Spain) F Verdasco	3	6	4

== Qualifying ==
=== Seeds ===
1. (Portugal) Fred Gil (qualified)
2. (Germany) Mischa Zverev (qualifying competition)
3. (Spain) Daniel Gimeno Traver (qualified)
4. (Chile) Nicolás Massú (first round)
5. (Chile) Paul Capdeville (first round)
6. (Spain) Pablo Andújar (qualifying competition)
7. (Belgium) Kristof Vliegen (qualifying competition)
8. (Spain) Iván Navarro (first round)
9. (Ecuador) Nicolás Lapentti (qualified)
10. (Kazakhstan) Andrey Golubev (first round)
11. (Italy) Fabio Fognini (qualified)
12. (Spain) Rubén Ramírez Hidalgo (first round)
13. (Italy) Flavio Cipolla (qualifying competition)
14. (Spain) Santiago Ventura Bertomeu (qualified)

=== Qualifiers ===
1. (Portugal) Fred Gil
2. (Spain) Santiago Ventura Bertomeu
3. (Spain) Daniel Gimeno Traver
4. (Spain) Pere Riba
5. (Ecuador) Nicolás Lapentti
6. (Kazakhstan) Mikhail Kukushkin
7. (Italy) Fabio Fognini

=== Draw ===
==== First qualifier ====
First round
1	(Portugal) Fred Gil	6	6
(Andorra) Laurent Recouderc	1	1
(Spain) Daniel Muñoz de la Nava	4	6	6
12	(Spain) Rubén Ramírez Hidalgo	6	3	0

Qualifying competition
1	(Portugal) Fred Gil	6	2	6
(Spain) Daniel Muñoz de la Nava	3	6	1

==== Second qualifier ====
First round
2	(Germany) Mischa Zverev	6	3	6
(Poland) Łukasz Kubot	4	6	1
(Spain) Miguel Ángel López Jaén	4	2
14	(Spain) Santiago Ventura Bertomeu	6	6

Qualifying competition
2	(Germany) Mischa Zverev	4	7^{7}	3
14	(Spain) Santiago Ventura Bertomeu	6	6^{3}	6

==== Third qualifier ====
First round
3	(Spain) Daniel Gimeno Traver	3	7^{7}	6
(Switzerland) Stéphane Bohli	6	6^{4}	2
WC	(Spain) Albert Ramos Viñolas	6	6
8	(Spain) Iván Navarro	3	4

Qualifying competition
3	(Spain) Daniel Gimeno Traver	3	7^{7}	7
WC	(Spain) Albert Ramos Viñolas	6	6^{3}	5

==== Fourth qualifier ====
First round
4	(Chile) Nicolás Massú	4	4
(Spain) Pere Riba	6	6
(France) Josselin Ouanna	1	4
13	(Italy) Flavio Cipolla	6	6

Qualifying competition
(Spain) Pere Riba	6	7^{7}
13	(Italy) Flavio Cipolla	2	6^{5}

==== Fifth qualifier ====
First round
5	(Chile) Paul Capdeville	1	2
WC	(Spain) Marc López	6	6
(Uruguay) Pablo Cuevas	6	3	0
9	(Ecuador) Nicolás Lapentti	2	6	6

Qualifying competition
WC	(Spain) Marc López	7	2	1
9	(Ecuador) Nicolás Lapentti	5	6	6

==== Sixth qualifier ====
First round
6	(Spain) Pablo Andújar	6	6
WC	(Spain) David Marrero	3	2
(Kazakhstan) Mikhail Kukushkin	7^{7}	6
10	(Kazakhstan) Andrey Golubev	6^{5}	4

Qualifying competition
6	(Spain) Pablo Andújar	4	6	2
(Kazakhstan) Mikhail Kukushkin	6	4	6

==== Seventh qualifier ====
First round
7	(Belgium) Kristof Vliegen	1	6	6
WC	(Spain) Guillermo Alcaide	6	3	3
(Morocco) Lamine Ouahab	6	2	6^{8}
11	(Italy) Fabio Fognini	1	6	7^{10}

Qualifying competition
7	(Belgium) Kristof Vliegen	6	3	4
11	(Italy) Fabio Fognini	2	6	6
