= 2009 Barcelona Open Banco Sabadell =

- Date: 20–26 April
- Edition: 57th
- Category: ATP World Tour 500
- Draw: 56S / 24D
- Prize money: $2,347,058
- Surface: Clay / outdoor
- Location: Barcelona, Spain
- Venue: Real Club de Tenis Barcelona

Champions

Singles
- (Spain) Rafael Nadal

Doubles
- (Canada) Daniel Nestor / (Serbia) Nenad Zimonjić
← 2008 ·	Barcelona Open	· 2010 →

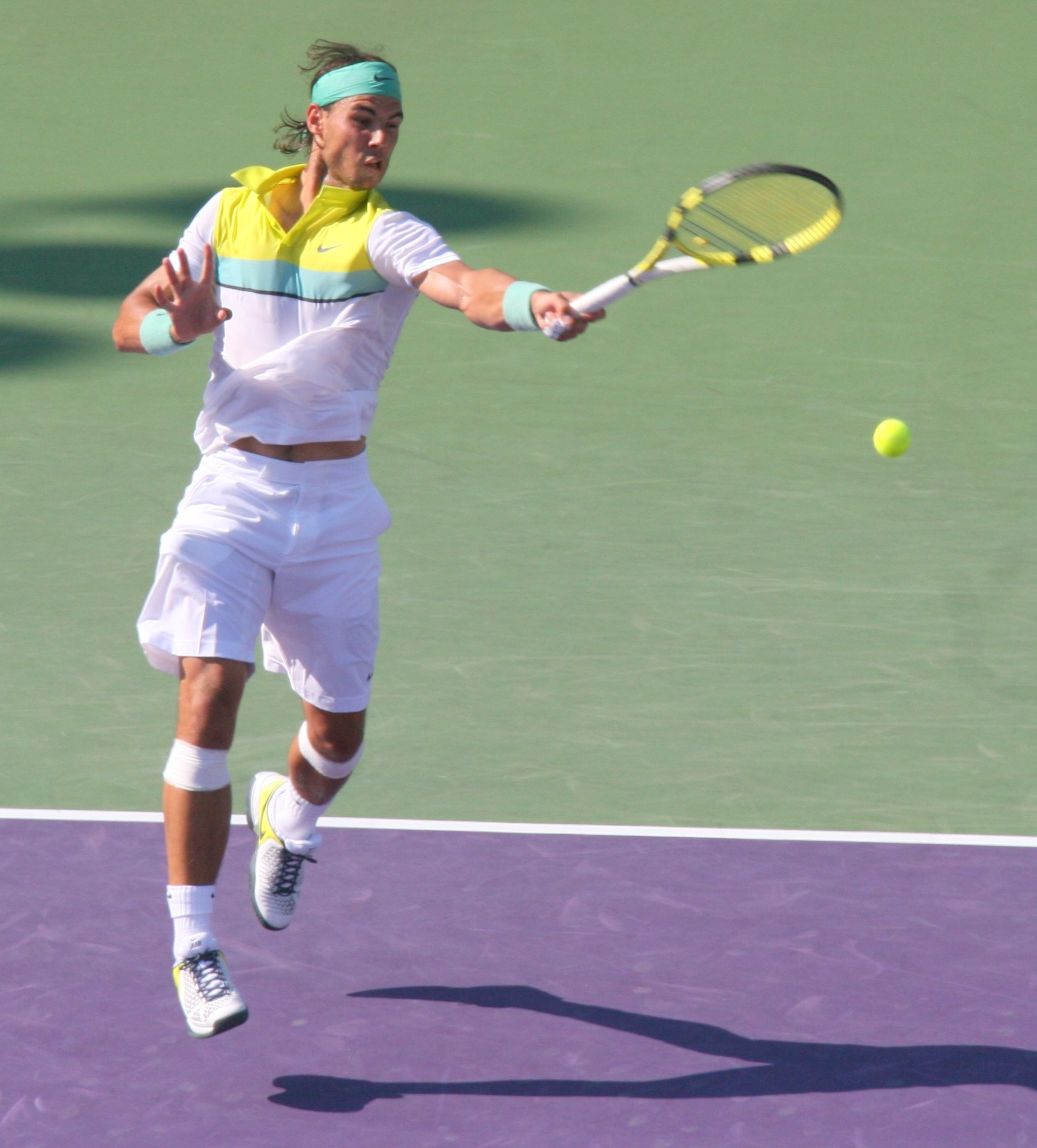
World No. 1, singles defending champion Rafael Nadal

The 2009 Barcelona Open Banco Sabadell, also known as the Trofeo Torneo de Godó, was a men's tennis tournament played on outdoor clay courts. It was the 57th edition of the event known that year as the Barcelona Open Banco Sabadell, and was part of the ATP World Tour 500 series of the 2009 ATP World Tour. It took place at the Real Club de Tenis Barcelona in Barcelona, Spain, from 20 April through 26 April 2009.

The event also featured a seniors' tournament that was part of the ATP Champions Tour, which was held from 15 to 19 April. Félix Mantilla won the title.

== Finals ==
=== Singles ===
(Spain) Rafael Nadal defeated (Spain) David Ferrer 6–2, 7–5

- It was Nadal's 4th singles title of the year, and his 35th singles title overall. It was his 5th consecutive win at the event.

=== Doubles ===
(Canada) Daniel Nestor / (Serbia) Nenad Zimonjić defeated (India) Mahesh Bhupathi / (The Bahamas) Mark Knowles 6–3, 7–6^{(11–9)}

=== Seniors ===
(Spain) Félix Mantilla defeated (Spain) Albert Costa 6–4, 6–1

== Entrants ==
=== Seeds ===
Athlete	Nationality	Ranking*	Seeding
Rafael Nadal	Spain	1	1
Fernando Verdasco	Spain	7	2
Nikolay Davydenko	Russia	8	3
David Ferrer	Spain	13	4
Fernando González	Chile	14	5
Tommy Robredo	Spain	16	6
David Nalbandian	Argentina	15	7
Stanislas Wawrinka	Switzerland	12	8
Radek Štěpánek	Czech Republic	19	9
Nicolás Almagro	Spain	22	10
Marat Safin	Russia	20	11
Igor Andreev	Russia	26	12
Richard Gasquet	France	21	13
Robin Söderling	Sweden	24	14
Tomáš Berdych	Czech Republic	28	15
Feliciano López	Spain	33	16

- Rankings as of April 20, 2009.

=== Other entrants ===
The following players received wildcards into the main draw:

- (Spain) Juan Carlos Ferrero
- (Argentina) Gastón Gaudio
- (Spain) Alberto Martín
- (Chile) Fernando González
- (Russia) Marat Safin

The following players received entry from the qualifying draw:

- (Portugal) Frederico Gil
- (Spain) Santiago Ventura
- (Spain) Daniel Gimeno-Traver
- (Spain) Pere Riba
- (Ecuador) Nicolás Lapentti
- (Kazakhstan) Mikhail Kukushkin
- (Italy) Fabio Fognini
