= 2011 Barcelona Open Banco Sabadell – Doubles =

Doubles
- 2011 Barcelona Open Banco Sabadell

Final
- Champions: (Mexico) Santiago González (United States) Scott Lipsky
- Runners-up: (United States) Bob Bryan (United States) Mike Bryan
- Score: 5–7, 6–2, [12–10]

Events
Singles	Doubles
← 2010 ·	Barcelona Open Banco Sabadell	· 2012 →

Daniel Nestor and Nenad Zimonjić were the defending champions, but decided not to participate together.
Zimonjić partnered up with Jürgen Melzer, while Nestor played alongside Max Mirnyi. These pairs were both eliminated by eventual champions Santiago González and Scott Lipsky, who won in the final against Bob Bryan and Mike Bryan 5–7, 6–2, [12–10].

== Seeds ==
All seeds received a bye into the second round.

1. (United States) Bob Bryan / (United States) Mike Bryan (final)
2. (Belarus) Max Mirnyi / (Canada) Daniel Nestor (semifinals)
3. (Austria) Jürgen Melzer / (Serbia) Nenad Zimonjić (second round)
4. (Poland) Łukasz Kubot / (Austria) Oliver Marach (semifinals)
5. (Poland) Mariusz Fyrstenberg / (Poland) Marcin Matkowski (second round)
6. (India) Rohan Bopanna / (Pakistan) Aisam-ul-Haq Qureshi (second round)
7. (Sweden) Robert Lindstedt / (Romania) Horia Tecău (quarterfinals)
8. (The Bahamas) Mark Knowles / (Slovakia) Michal Mertiňák (quarterfinals)

== Draw ==
=== Key ===
- Q = Qualifier
- WC = Wild card
- LL = Lucky loser
- Alt = Alternate
- SE = Special exempt
- PR = Protected ranking
- ITF = ITF entry
- JE = Junior exempt
- w/o = Walkover
- r = Retired
- d = Defaulted
- SR = Special ranking

=== Finals ===
Semifinals
1	(United States) Bob Bryan (United States) Mike Bryan	6	6
4	(Poland) Łukasz Kubot (Austria) Oliver Marach	3	4
(Mexico) Santiago González (United States) Scott Lipsky	7^{7}	6
2	(Belarus) Max Mirnyi (Canada) Daniel Nestor	6^{4}	4

Final
1	(United States) Bob Bryan (United States) Mike Bryan	7	2	[10]
(Mexico) Santiago González (United States) Scott Lipsky	5	6	[12]

=== Top half ===
First round
(Czech Republic) F Čermák (Israel) A Ram	1	6	[10]
(Kazakhstan) A Golubev (Uzbekistan) D Istomin	6	4	[6]
(Spain) M Granollers (Spain) F López	6^{6}	4
(United States) E Butorac (Curaçao) J-J Rojer	7^{8}	6
(Ukraine) A Dolgopolov (Belgium) X Malisse	6	6
(Spain) N Almagro (Canada) M Raonic	2	4
(Spain) G García López (Spain) A Montañés	1	6	[2]
WC	(Spain) P Andújar (Spain) D Gimeno Traver	6	1	[10]

Second round
1	(United States) B Bryan (United States) M Bryan	6	6^{4}	[10]
(Czech Republic) F Čermák (Israel) A Ram	2	7^{7}	[5]
(United States) E Butorac (Curaçao) J-J Rojer	4	4
8	(The Bahamas) M Knowles (Slovakia) M Mertiňák	6	6
4	(Poland) Ł Kubot (Austria) O Marach	6	6
(Ukraine) A Dolgopolov (Belgium) X Malisse	3	4
WC	(Spain) P Andújar (Spain) D Gimeno Traver	6	7^{7}
6	(India) R Boppanna (Pakistan) A-u-H Qureshi	2	6^{3}

Quarterfinals
1	(United States) B Bryan (United States) M Bryan	6	3	[10]
8	(The Bahamas) M Knowles (Slovakia) M Mertiňák	4	6	[8]
4	(Poland) Ł Kubot (Austria) O Marach	2	6	[10]
WC	(Spain) P Andújar (Spain) D Gimeno Traver	6	3	[3]

Semifinals
1	(United States) B Bryan (United States) M Bryan	6	6
4	(Poland) Ł Kubot (Austria) O Marach	3	4

=== Bottom half ===
First round
(Italy) D Bracciali (Spain) D Marrero	6^{4}	5
(South Africa) K Anderson (Sweden) S Aspelin	7^{7}	7
(Mexico) S González (United States) S Lipsky	6^{0}	6	[10]
WC	(Spain) P Carreño Busta (Spain) A Ramos	7^{7}	2	[8]
(Brazil) M Melo (Brazil) B Soares	2	4
(Spain) M López (Argentina) J Mónaco	6	6
(Brazil) T Bellucci (Croatia) I Dodig	4	2
(Uruguay) P Cuevas (Czech Republic) L Dlouhý	6	6

Second round
5	(Poland) M Fyrstenberg (Poland) M Matkowski	5	5
(South Africa) K Anderson (Sweden) S Aspelin	7	7
(Mexico) S González (United States) S Lipsky	6	6
3	(Austria) J Melzer (Serbia) N Zimonjić	3	2
7	(Sweden) R Lindstedt (Romania) H Tecău	6	6
(Spain) M López (Argentina) J Mónaco	0	2
(Uruguay) P Cuevas (Czech Republic) L Dlouhý	2	6	[12]
2	(Belarus) M Mirnyi (Canada) D Nestor	6	4	[14]

Quarterfinals
(South Africa) K Anderson (Sweden) S Aspelin	6^{5}	4
(Mexico) S González (United States) S Lipsky	7^{7}	6
7	(Sweden) R Lindstedt (Romania) H Tecău	3	4
2	(Belarus) M Mirnyi (Canada) D Nestor	6	6

Semifinals
(Mexico) S González (United States) S Lipsky	7^{7}	6
2	(Belarus) M Mirnyi (Canada) D Nestor	6^{4}	4
