= 2010 Barcelona Open Banco Sabadell =

- Date: 19–25 April
- Edition: 58th
- Category: ATP World Tour 500
- Draw: 56S / 24D
- Prize money: €1,550,000
- Surface: Clay / outdoor
- Location: Barcelona, Catalonia, Spain
- Venue: Real Club de Tenis Barcelona

Champions

Singles
- (Spain) Fernando Verdasco

Doubles
- (Canada) Daniel Nestor / (Serbia) Nenad Zimonjić
← 2009 ·	Barcelona Open	· 2011 →

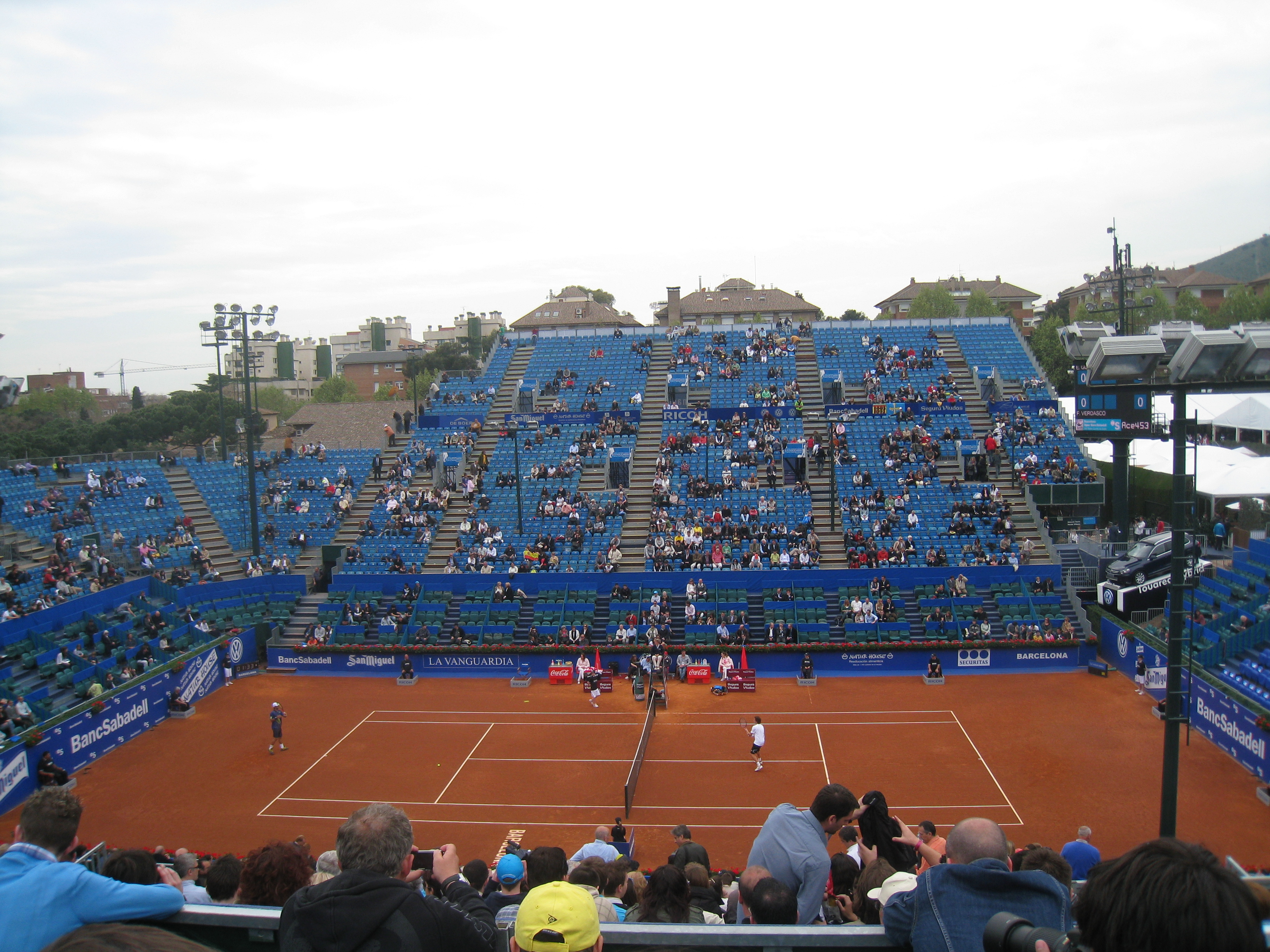
Central court, 2010 Barcelona Open Banco Sabadell

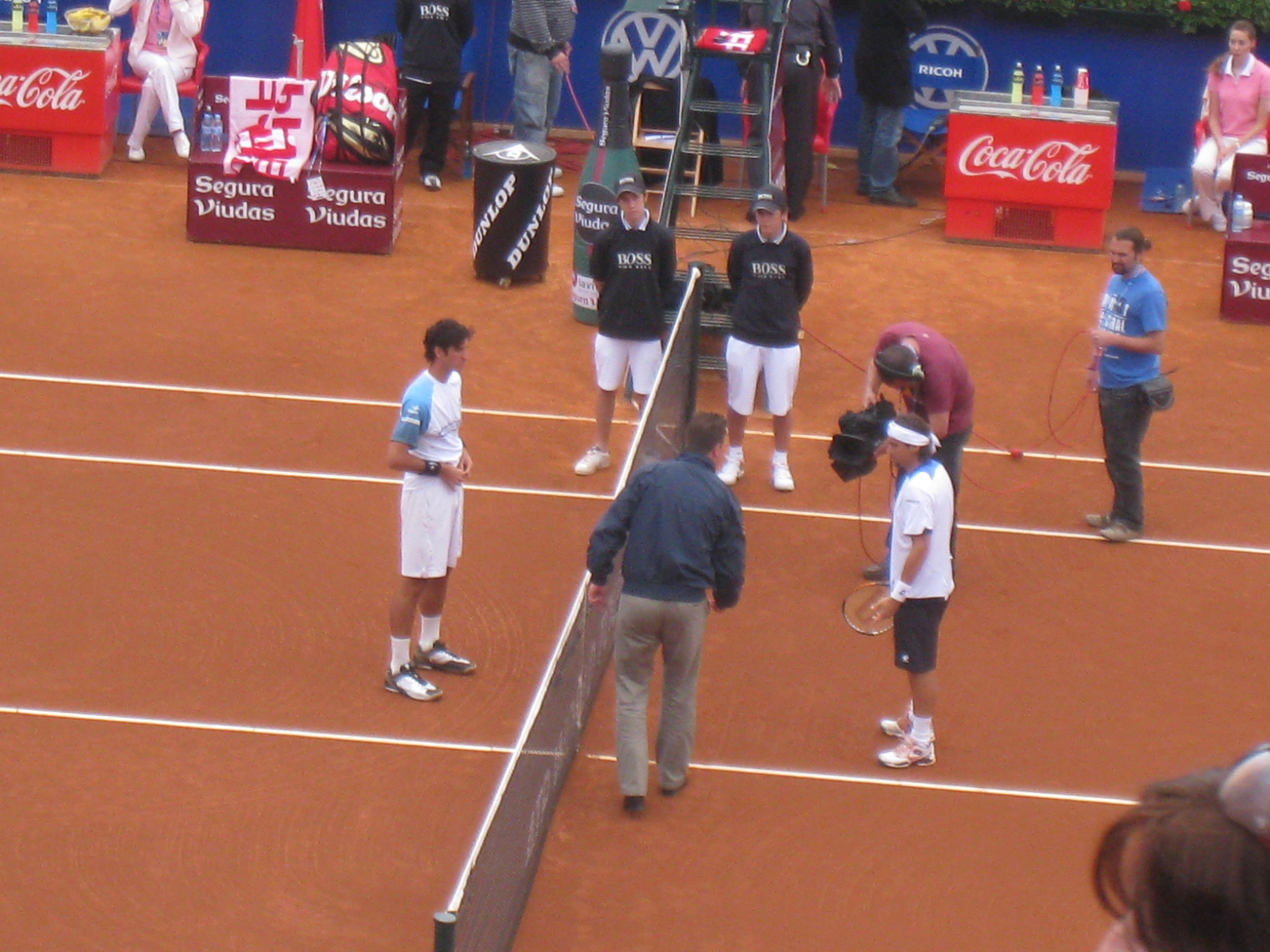
Thomaz Bellucci and David Ferrer, 2010 Barcelona Open Banco Sabadell

The 2010 Barcelona Open Banco Sabadell (also known as the Torneo Godó) was a tennis tournament played on outdoor clay courts. It was the 58th edition of the event known this year as the Barcelona Open Banco Sabadell, and was part of the ATP World Tour 500 series of the 2010 ATP World Tour. It took place at the Real Club de Tenis Barcelona in Barcelona, Catalonia, Spain, from April 19 through April 25, 2010.

Defending champion Rafael Nadal withdrew from the tournament this year citing fatigue.

The event also featured a seniors' tournament that was part of the ATP Champions Tour, which was held from April 16 to 18. Goran Ivanišević won the title.

== Finals ==
=== Singles ===
(Spain) Fernando Verdasco defeated (Sweden) Robin Söderling, 6–3, 4–6, 6–3

- It was Verdasco's 2nd title of the year and 5th of his career. It was the 8th straight year a Spaniard had won the title.

=== Doubles ===
(Canada) Daniel Nestor / (Serbia) Nenad Zimonjić defeated (Australia) Lleyton Hewitt / (The Bahamas) Mark Knowles, 4–6, 6–3, [10–6]

=== Seniors ===
(Croatia) Goran Ivanišević defeated (Sweden) Thomas Enqvist, 6–4, 6–4

== Entrants ==
=== Seeds ===
Athlete	Nationality	Ranking*	Seeding
~~Rafael Nadal~~	~~Spain~~	~~3~~	~~1~~
Robin Söderling	Sweden	8	2
Jo-Wilfried Tsonga	France	10	3
Fernando González	Chile	11	4
Fernando Verdasco	Spain	12	5
~~Tomáš Berdych~~	~~Czech Republic~~	~~15~~	~~6~~
Juan Carlos Ferrero	Spain	16	7
David Ferrer	Spain	17	8
Tommy Robredo	Spain	23	9
Juan Mónaco	Argentina	24	10
Jürgen Melzer	Austria	27	11
Lleyton Hewitt	Australia	30	12
Thomaz Bellucci	Brazil	31	13
Albert Montañés	Spain	32	14
Nicolás Almagro	Spain	34	15
Feliciano López	Spain	35	16

- Rankings as of April 12, 2010.

=== Other entrants ===
The following players received wildcards into the main draw:

- (Spain) Marcel Granollers
- (Serbia) Filip Krajinović
- (Spain) Alberto Martín
- (Argentina) David Nalbandian
- (Spain) Fernando Verdasco

The following players received entry from the qualifying draw:

- (Italy) Simone Bolelli
- (Uruguay) Pablo Cuevas
- (Spain) Daniel Gimeno-Traver
- (Turkey) Marsel İlhan
- (Spain) Albert Ramos-Viñolas
- (Spain) Pere Riba
- (Belgium) Christophe Rochus

The following players received the lucky loser spot:

- (Russia) Teymuraz Gabashvili
- (Ecuador) Nicolás Lapentti
- (Spain) Iván Navarro

=== Notable withdrawals ===
The following players withdrew from the tournament for various reasons:

- (Spain) Rafael Nadal (fatigue)
- (Russia) Nikolay Davydenko (wrist injury)
- (Germany) Philipp Kohlschreiber (abductor)
- (Argentina) Juan Martín del Potro (wrist injury)
- (Czech Republic) Radek Štěpánek
- (France) Gilles Simon (right knee)
- (Czech Republic) Tomáš Berdych (left ankle)
- (Argentina) David Nalbandian (right leg)
