= 2011 Barcelona Open Banco Sabadell – Singles =

Singles
- 2011 Barcelona Open Banco Sabadell

Final
- Champion: (Spain) Rafael Nadal
- Runner-up: (Spain) David Ferrer
- Score: 6–2, 6–4

Details
- Draw: 56 (7 Q / 5 WC )
- Seeds: 16

Events
Singles	Doubles
← 2010 ·	Barcelona Open	· 2012 →

Rafael Nadal defeated David Ferrer in the final, 6–2, 6–4, to win his record-extending sixth title at the Barcelona Open.

Fernando Verdasco was the defending champion but chose not to compete this year.

== Seeds ==
The top eight seeds received a bye into the second round.

1. (Spain) Rafael Nadal (champion)
2. (United Kingdom) Andy Murray (withdrew due to an elbow injury)
3. (Sweden) Robin Söderling (second round)
4. (Spain) David Ferrer (final)
5. (Czech Republic) Tomáš Berdych (withdrew due to gastroenteritis)
6. (Austria) Jürgen Melzer (quarterfinals)
7. (France) Gaël Monfils (quarterfinals)
8. (Spain) Nicolás Almagro (semifinals)
9. (France) Richard Gasquet (third round)
10. (Ukraine) Alexandr Dolgopolov (first round)
11. (Spain) Albert Montañés (third round)
12. (Spain) Guillermo García López (second round)
13. (Brazil) Thomaz Bellucci (first round)
14. (South Africa) Kevin Anderson (second round)
15. (Canada) Milos Raonic (third round)
16. (Argentina) Juan Mónaco (second round)

== Draw ==
=== Key ===
- Q = Qualifier
- WC = Wild card
- LL = Lucky loser
- Alt = Alternate
- SE = Special exempt
- PR = Protected ranking
- ITF = ITF entry
- JE = Junior exempt
- w/o = Walkover
- r = Retired
- d = Defaulted
- SR = Special ranking

=== Finals ===
Quarterfinals
1	(Spain) Rafael Nadal	6	6
7	(France) Gaël Monfils	2	2
(Croatia) Ivan Dodig	6	2	6
(Spain) Feliciano López	4	6	4
6	(Austria) Jürgen Melzer	3	3
4	(Spain) David Ferrer	6	6
8	(Spain) Nicolás Almagro	6	6
(Spain) Juan Carlos Ferrero	3	3

Semifinals
1	(Spain) Rafael Nadal	6	6
(Croatia) Ivan Dodig	3	2
4	(Spain) David Ferrer	6	6
8	(Spain) Nicolás Almagro	3	4

Final
1	(Spain) Rafael Nadal	6	6
4	(Spain) David Ferrer	2	4

=== Top half ===
==== Section 1 ====
First round
(Spain) D Gimeno Traver	4	6	2
(Italy) P Starace	6	1	0^{r}
(Spain) R Ramírez Hidalgo	6	6^{5}	5
WC	(Spain) A Ramos	4	7^{7}	7
(Colombia) S Giraldo	7	6
13	(Brazil) T Bellucci	5	3
9	(France) R Gasquet	2	7^{7}	6
(Argentina) JI Chela	6	6^{2}	4
(Germany) T Kamke	2	3
(Slovenia) B Kavčič	6	6
Q	(Italy) F Cipolla	4	3
(Netherlands) R Haase	6	6

Second round
1	(Spain) R Nadal	6	6
(Spain) D Gimeno Traver	1	1
WC	(Spain) A Ramos	3	6	3
(Colombia) S Giraldo	6	4	6
9	(France) R Gasquet	6	4	6
(Slovenia) B Kavčič	3	6	2
(Netherlands) R Haase	6	6^{3}	2
7	(France) G Monfils	3	7^{7}	6

Third round
1	(Spain) R Nadal	6	6
(Colombia) S Giraldo	3	1
9	(France) R Gasquet	4	6^{7}
7	(France) G Monfils	6	7^{9}

Quarterfinals
1	(Spain) R Nadal	6	6
7	(France) G Monfils	2	2

==== Section 2 ====
First round
Q	(France) V Millot	2	3
(Croatia) I Dodig	6	6
(United States) R Kendrick	4	4
Q	(Germany) S Greul	6	6
(Czech Republic) R Štěpánek	4	2
15	(Canada) M Raonic	6	6
12	(Spain) G García López	7^{8}	6
(Uzbekistan) D Istomin	6^{6}	3
(Spain) F López	6	6^{7}	6
(Kazakhstan) M Kukushkin	2	7^{9}	4
(Japan) K Nishikori	6
(Spain) P Riba	2	r

Second round
3	(Sweden) R Söderling	2	4
(Croatia) I Dodig	6	6
Q	(Germany) S Greul	3	6	6^{5}
15	(Canada) M Raonic	6	4	7^{7}
12	(Spain) G García López	7^{7}	3	4
(Spain) F López	6^{2}	6	6
(Japan) K Nishikori	6	6
LL	(Portugal) R Machado	1	4

Third round
(Croatia) I Dodig	7^{7}	4	6
15	(Canada) M Raonic	6^{0}	6	3
(Spain) F López	6	7^{7}
(Japan) K Nishikori	4	6^{5}

Quarterfinals
(Croatia) I Dodig	6	2	6
(Spain) F López	4	6	4

=== Bottom half ===
==== Section 3 ====
First round
(Spain) M Granollers	7	6^{5}	6
(Germany) D Brands	5	7^{7}	1
Q	(France) B Paire	6^{7}	6	6
WC	(Spain) P Carreño Busta	7^{9}	3	2
(Russia) T Gabashvili	2	2
11	(Spain) A Montañés	6	6
14	(South Africa) K Anderson	7	3	6
(Uruguay) P Cuevas	5	6	4
(Kazakhstan) A Golubev	3	2
(Romania) V Hănescu	6	6
Q	(Finland) J Nieminen	4	6	2
(Argentina) C Berlocq	6	4	6

Second round
6	(Austria) J Melzer	6	6
(Spain) M Granollers	1	3
Q	(France) B Paire	7^{7}	1	4
11	(Spain) A Montañés	6^{3}	6	6
14	(South Africa) K Anderson	4	4
(Romania) V Hănescu	6	6
(Argentina) C Berlocq	2	2
4	(Spain) D Ferrer	6	6

Third round
6	(Austria) J Melzer	6^{2}	6	6
11	(Spain) A Montañés	7^{7}	3	2
(Romania) V Hănescu	3	2
4	(Spain) D Ferrer	6	6

Quarterfinals
6	(Austria) J Melzer	3	3
4	(Spain) D Ferrer	6	6

==== Section 4 ====
First round
WC	(Spain) G Granollers-Pujol	0	1
(Spain) P Andújar	6	6
WC	(Russia) A Kuznetsov	2	4
Q	(France) É Roger-Vasselin	6	6
(Russia) N Davydenko	6	7^{8}
10	(Ukraine) A Dolgopolov	4	6^{6}
16/WC	(Argentina) J Mónaco	6	6
(Bulgaria) G Dimitrov	4	1
(Italy) F Fognini	6	2	r
Q	(Italy) S Vagnozzi	2	4
(Belgium) X Malisse	4	2
(Spain) JC Ferrero	6	6

Second round
8	(Spain) N Almagro	7	7^{7}
(Spain) P Andújar	5	6^{1}
Q	(France) É Roger-Vasselin	2	6^{11}
(Russia) N Davydenko	6	7^{13}
16/WC	(Argentina) J Mónaco	3	2
Q	(Italy) S Vagnozzi	6	6
(Spain) JC Ferrero	6	7
LL	(Germany) M Zverev	4	5

Third round
8	(Spain) N Almagro	7^{7}	6
(Russia) N Davydenko	6^{2}	3
Q	(Italy) S Vagnozzi	6^{3}	6	4
(Spain) JC Ferrero	7^{7}	4	6

Quarterfinals
8	(Spain) N Almagro	6	6
(Spain) JC Ferrero	3	3
