= 2010 Barcelona Open Banco Sabadell – Singles =

Singles
- 2010 Barcelona Open Banco Sabadell

Final
- Champion: (Spain) Fernando Verdasco
- Runner-up: (Sweden) Robin Söderling
- Score: 6–3, 4–6, 6–3

Details
- Draw: 56 (4WC/7Q/4LL)
- Seeds: 16

Events
Singles	Doubles
← 2009 ·	Barcelona Open	· 2011 →

Fernando Verdasco defeated Robin Söderling in the final, 6–3, 4–6, 6–3, to win the singles tennis title at the 2010 Barcelona Open. It was his first Barcelona Open title.

Rafael Nadal was the five-time reigning champion, but withdrew before the tournament due to fatigue.

== Seeds ==
The top eight seeds receive a bye into the second round.

1. (Spain) ~~Rafael Nadal~~ (withdrew due to fatigue)
2. (Sweden) Robin Söderling (final)
3. (France) Jo-Wilfried Tsonga (quarterfinals)
4. (Chile) Fernando González (second round)
5. (Spain) Fernando Verdasco (champion)
6. (Czech Republic) ~~Tomáš Berdych~~ (withdrew due to left ankle injury)
7. (Spain) Juan Carlos Ferrero (third round)
8. (Spain) David Ferrer (semifinals)
9. (Spain) Tommy Robredo (first round, retired due to back injury)
10. (Argentina) Juan Mónaco (first round)
11. (Austria) Jürgen Melzer (third round)
12. (Australia) Lleyton Hewitt (second round)
13. (Brazil) Thomaz Bellucci (quarterfinals)
14. (Spain) Albert Montañés (first round)
15. (Spain) Nicolás Almagro (third round)
16. (Spain) Feliciano López (third round)

== Draw ==
=== Key ===
- Q = Qualifier
- WC = Wild card
- LL = Lucky loser
- Alt = Alternate
- SE = Special exempt
- PR = Protected ranking
- ITF = ITF entry
- JE = Junior exempt
- w/o = Walkover
- r = Retired
- d = Defaulted
- SR = Special ranking

=== Finals ===
Quarterfinals
13	(Brazil) Thomaz Bellucci	4	0
8	(Spain) David Ferrer	6	6
(Latvia) Ernests Gulbis	2	6^{4}
5/WC	(Spain) Fernando Verdasco	6	7
(Netherlands) Thiemo de Bakker	6	3	6
3	(France) Jo-Wilfried Tsonga	4	6	3
(Argentina) Eduardo Schwank	2	3
2	(Sweden) Robin Söderling	6	6

Semifinals
8	(Spain) David Ferrer	7	5	1
5/WC	(Spain) Fernando Verdasco	6^{3}	7	6
(Netherlands) Thiemo de Bakker	1	4
2	(Sweden) Robin Söderling	6	6

Final
5/WC	(Spain) Fernando Verdasco	6	4	6
2	(Sweden) Robin Söderling	3	6	3

=== Top half ===
==== Section 1 ====
First round
(Spain) G García López	5	6	6
Q	(Belgium) C Rochus	7	1	3
(Romania) V Hănescu	6	6
(Germany) A Beck	1	2
(Finland) J Nieminen	4	4
13	(Brazil) T Bellucci	6	6
9	(Spain) T Robredo	7	4	1^{r}
Q	(Italy) S Bolelli	6^{7}	6	3
WC	(Spain) A Martín	7	6
LL	(Kazakhstan) M Kukushkin	5	4
(Poland) Ł Kubot	4	3
WC	(Spain) M Granollers	6	6

Second round
LL	(Russia) T Gabashvili	6	6^{5}	4
(Spain) G García López	1	7	6
(Romania) V Hănescu	2	6	5
13	(Brazil) T Bellucci	6	1	7
Q	(Italy) S Bolelli	7	7
WC	(Spain) A Martín	6^{2}	6^{1}
WC	(Spain) M Granollers	5	4
8	(Spain) D Ferrer	7	6

Third round
(Spain) G García López	4	4
13	(Brazil) T Bellucci	6	6
Q	(Italy) S Bolelli	0	0	r
8	(Spain) D Ferrer	6	3

Quarterfinals
13	(Brazil) T Bellucci	4	0
8	(Spain) D Ferrer	6	6

==== Section 2 ====
First round
(United States) M Russell	4	3
Q	(Spain) A Ramos Viñolas	6	6
(Australia) P Luczak	6^{4}	3
(Latvia) E Gulbis	7	6
(France) J Chardy	6	7
14	(Spain) A Montañés	3	6^{1}
11	(Austria) J Melzer	6	6
LL	(Ecuador) N Lapentti	3	3
(Ukraine) I Marchenko	7	2	4
(Spain) Ó Hernández	6^{2}	6	6
(France) R Gasquet	7	6
(Russia) I Andreev	6^{5}	4

Second round
4	(Chile) F González	4	7	3
Q	(Spain) A Ramos Viñolas	6	6^{8}	6
(Latvia) E Gulbis	6	6
(France) J Chardy	3	2
11	(Austria) J Melzer	6^{4}	7	7
(Spain) Ó Hernández	7	5	5
(France) R Gasquet	5	3
5/WC	(Spain) F Verdasco	7	6

Third round
Q	(Spain) A Ramos Viñolas	1	3
(Latvia) E Gulbis	6	6
11	(Austria) J Melzer	6	6^{1}	3
5/WC	(Spain) F Verdasco	3	7	6

Quarterfinals
(Latvia) E Gulbis	2	6^{4}
5/WC	(Spain) F Verdasco	6	7

=== Bottom half ===
==== Section 3 ====
First round
(Ukraine) S Stakhovsky	4	6	6
(Germany) M Zverev	6	4	2
(Netherlands) T de Bakker	6	6
(Colombia) A Falla	1	0
Q	(Spain) D Gimeno Traver	6	3	6
10	(Argentina) J Mónaco	2	6	2
15	(Spain) N Almagro	6	6
(Spain) S Ventura	1	2
Q	(Spain) P Riba	4	4
(Germany) S Greul	6	6
(Czech Republic) J Hájek	6	6
(Italy) P Starace	1	4

Second round
7	(Spain) JC Ferrero	6	4
(Ukraine) S Stakhovsky	3	2	r
(Netherlands) T de Bakker	7	6
Q	(Spain) D Gimeno Traver	6^{5}	3
15	(Spain) N Almagro	6	6
(Germany) S Greul	1	3
(Czech Republic) J Hájek	3	2
3	(France) J-W Tsonga	6	6

Third round
7	(Spain) JC Ferrero	6^{2}	6	6^{4}
(Netherlands) T de Bakker	7	3	7
15	(Spain) N Almagro	7	1	4
3	(France) J-W Tsonga	5	6	6

Quarterfinals
(Netherlands) T de Bakker	6	3	6
3	(France) J-W Tsonga	4	6	3

==== Section 4 ====
First round
(Argentina) H Zeballos	6^{2}	2
Q	(Uruguay) P Cuevas	7	6
(Argentina) E Schwank	6	6
(Italy) F Fognini	1	4
Q	(Turkey) M İlhan	4	6	2
12	(Australia) L Hewitt	6	4	6
16	(Spain) F López	6	3
(Ukraine) O Dolgopolov Jr.	3	0	r
(France) S Robert	6^{5}	6	1
(Uzbekistan) D Istomin	7	1	6
WC	(Serbia) F Krajinović	1	4
(Argentina) JI Chela	6	6

Second round
LL	(Spain) I Navarro	6	6
Q	(Uruguay) P Cuevas	2	4
(Argentina) E Schwank	7	6
12	(Australia) L Hewitt	6^{3}	4
16	(Spain) F López	7	7
(Uzbekistan) D Istomin	6^{7}	5
(Argentina) JI Chela	5	5
2	(Sweden) R Söderling	7	7

Third round
LL	(Spain) I Navarro	3	6^{7}
(Argentina) E Schwank	6	7
16	(Spain) F López	3	2
2	(Sweden) R Söderling	6	6

Quarterfinals
(Argentina) E Schwank	2	3
2	(Sweden) R Söderling	6	6

== Qualifying ==
=== Seeds ===
1. (Uruguay) Pablo Cuevas (qualified)
2. (Spain) Pere Riba (qualified)
3. (Ecuador) Nicolás Lapentti (qualifying competition, lucky loser)
4. (Spain) Daniel Gimeno Traver (qualified)
5. (Spain) Iván Navarro (qualifying competition, lucky loser)
6. (Italy) Simone Bolelli (qualified)
7. (Turkey) Marsel İlhan (qualified)
8. (Russia) Teymuraz Gabashvili (qualifying competition, lucky loser)
9. (Kazakhstan) Mikhail Kukushkin (qualifying competition, lucky loser)
10. (Belgium) Christophe Rochus (qualified)
11. (France) ~~Josselin Ouanna~~ (withdrew, due to travelling)
12. (France) ~~Édouard Roger-Vasselin~~ (withdrew, due to travelling)
13. (Spain) Pablo Andújar (first round)
14. (Spain) Albert Ramos Viñolas (qualified)

=== Qualifiers ===
1. (Uruguay) Pablo Cuevas
2. (Spain) Pere Riba
3. (Spain) Albert Ramos Viñolas
4. (Spain) Daniel Gimeno Traver
5. (Belgium) Christophe Rochus
6. (Italy) Simone Bolelli
7. (Turkey) Marsel İlhan

=== Lucky loser ===
1. (Ecuador) Nicolás Lapentti
2. (Spain) Iván Navarro
3. (Russia) Teymuraz Gabashvili
4. (Kazakhstan) Mikhail Kukushkin

=== Draw ===
==== First qualifier ====
First round
1	(Uruguay) Pablo Cuevas	6	6
WC	(Spain) Pablo Carreño Busta	3	1
(Spain) Íñigo Cervantes	6	6
Alt	(Sweden) Christian Lindell	4	4

Qualifying competition
1	(Uruguay) Pablo Cuevas	7^{7}	6
(Spain) Íñigo Cervantes	6^{5}	3

==== Second qualifier ====
First round
2	(Spain) Pere Riba	6	6
(Tunisia) Malek Jaziri	2	1
(Spain) Adrián Menéndez Maceiras	3	4
8	(Russia) Teymuraz Gabashvili	6	6

Qualifying competition
2	(Spain) Pere Riba	6	2	6
8	(Russia) Teymuraz Gabashvili	1	6	3

==== Third qualifier ====
First round
3	(Ecuador) Nicolás Lapentti	7^{7}	6
(Spain) Roberto Bautista Agut	6^{4}	4
Alt	(Czech Republic) Jan Mertl	5	2
14	(Spain) Albert Ramos Viñolas	7	6

Qualifying competition
3	(Ecuador) Nicolás Lapentti	6^{4}	7^{7}	4
14	(Spain) Albert Ramos Viñolas	7^{7}	6^{3}	6

==== Fourth qualifier ====
First round
4	(Spain) Daniel Gimeno Traver	6	6
WC	(Spain) Ignacio Coll Riudavets	3	0
(Spain) David Marrero	6	6
Alt	(Czech Republic) Lukáš Dlouhý	1	2

Qualifying competition
4	(Spain) Daniel Gimeno Traver	6	6
(Spain) David Marrero	4	1

==== Fifth qualifier ====
First round
5	(Spain) Iván Navarro	3	6	6
(Italy) Flavio Cipolla	6	3	2
WC	(Spain) Gerard Granollers	4	1
10	(Belgium) Christophe Rochus	6	6

Qualifying competition
5	(Spain) Iván Navarro	2	0
10	(Belgium) Christophe Rochus	6	6

==== Sixth qualifier ====
First round
6	(Italy) Simone Bolelli	4	7^{7}	6
(Chile) Jorge Aguilar	6	6^{5}	4
(Spain) Pedro Clar-Rossello	2	2
9	(Kazakhstan) Mikhail Kukushkin	6	6

Qualifying competition
6	(Italy) Simone Bolelli	6	3	7
9	(Kazakhstan) Mikhail Kukushkin	3	6	5

==== Seventh qualifier ====
First round
7	(Turkey) Marsel İlhan	6	6
WC	(Spain) Fernando Vicente	3	2
(Serbia) Boris Pašanski	6	7^{7}
13	(Spain) Pablo Andújar	4	6^{4}

Qualifying competition
7	(Turkey) Marsel İlhan	7^{7}	2	6
(Serbia) Boris Pašanski	6^{4}	6	4
