= 2009 Barcelona Open Banco Sabadell – Doubles =

Doubles
- 2009 Barcelona Open Banco Sabadell

Final
- Champions: (Canada) Daniel Nestor (Serbia) Nenad Zimonjić
- Runners-up: (India) Mahesh Bhupathi (The Bahamas) Mark Knowles
- Score: 6–3, 7–6^{(11–9)}

Details
- Draw: 24 (2WC)
- Seeds: 8

Events
Singles	Doubles
← 2008 ·	Barcelona Open	· 2010 →

Bob Bryan and Mike Bryan were the defending champions, but lost in the semifinals to Mahesh Bhupathi and Mark Knowles.

Daniel Nestor and Nenad Zimonjić won in the final 6–3, 7–6^{(11–9)}, against Mahesh Bhupathi and Mark Knowles.

== Seeds ==
All seeds receive a bye into the second round.

1. (United States) Bob Bryan / (United States) Mike Bryan (semifinals)
2. (Canada) Daniel Nestor / (Serbia) Nenad Zimonjić (champions)
3. (Czech Republic) Lukáš Dlouhý / (India) Leander Paes (second round)
4. (India) Mahesh Bhupathi / (The Bahamas) Mark Knowles (final)
5. (Brazil) Bruno Soares / (Zimbabwe) Kevin Ullyett (quarterfinals)
6. (Poland) Mariusz Fyrstenberg / (Poland) Marcin Matkowski (second round)
7. (South Africa) Jeff Coetzee / (Australia) Jordan Kerr (second round)
8. (Brazil) Marcelo Melo / (Brazil) André Sá (second round)

== Draw ==
=== Key ===
- Q = Qualifier
- WC = Wild card
- LL = Lucky loser
- Alt = Alternate
- SE = Special exempt
- PR = Protected ranking
- ITF = ITF entry
- JE = Junior exempt
- w/o = Walkover
- r = Retired
- d = Defaulted
- SR = Special ranking

=== Finals ===
Semifinals
1	(United States) Bob Bryan (United States) Mike Bryan	2	7	[7]
4	(India) Mahesh Bhupathi (The Bahamas) Mark Knowles	6	6^{5}	[10]
(Sweden) Simon Aspelin (South Africa) Wesley Moodie	6^{1}	6^{8}
2	(Canada) Daniel Nestor (Serbia) Nenad Zimonjić	7	7

Final
4	(India) Mahesh Bhupathi (The Bahamas) Mark Knowles	3	6^{9}
2	(Canada) Daniel Nestor (Serbia) Nenad Zimonjić	6	7

=== Top half ===
First round
(United States) T Parrott (Slovakia) F Polášek	6^{4}	6	[10]
(Czech Republic) F Čermák (Slovakia) M Mertiňák	7	2	[7]
(Spain) M Granollers (Spain) T Robredo	3	6	[8]
(Poland) L Kubot (Austria) O Marach	6	3	[10]
(Spain) F López (Spain) F Verdasco	7	2	[7]
(Sweden) R Lindstedt (Sweden) R Söderling	6^{4}	6	[10]
(Spain) N Almagro (Spain) A Montañés	3	3
(Argentina) L Arnold Ker (Chile) F González	6	6

Second round
1	(United States) B Bryan (United States) M Bryan	6	6
(United States) T Parrott (Slovakia) F Polášek	3	4
(Poland) L Kubot (Austria) O Marach	7	6
8	(Brazil) M Melo (Brazil) A Sá	5	4
4	(India) M Bhupathi (The Bahamas) M Knowles	4	6	[10]
(Sweden) R Lindstedt (Sweden) R Söderling	6	1	[8]
(Argentina) L Arnold Ker (Chile) F González	6	6
6	(Poland) M Fyrstenberg (Poland) M Matkowski	2	3

Quarterfinals
1	(United States) B Bryan (United States) M Bryan	6	6
(Poland) L Kubot (Austria) O Marach	1	2
4	(India) M Bhupathi (The Bahamas) M Knowles	7	6
(Argentina) L Arnold Ker (Chile) F González	5	2

Semifinals
1	(United States) B Bryan (United States) M Bryan	2	7	[7]
4	(India) M Bhupathi (The Bahamas) M Knowles	6	6^{5}	[10]

=== Bottom half ===
First round
(Russia) M Safin (Serbia) D Vemić	3	6	[6]
(Czech Republic) R Štěpánek (Serbia) V Troicki	6	3	[10]
(Sweden) S Aspelin (South Africa) W Moodie	7	2	[12]
WC	(Spain) M López (Spain) F Vicente	6^{0}	6	[10]
(Australia) S Huss (United Kingdom) R Hutchins	6	5	[8]
WC	(Spain) G Alcaide (Spain) A Martín	3	7	[10]
(Austria) J Knowle (Austria) J Melzer	3	6	[10]
(Russia) N Davydenko (Russia) I Kunitsyn	6	4	[6]

Second round
7	(South Africa) J Coetzee (Australia) J Kerr	4	1
(Czech Republic) R Štěpánek (Serbia) V Troicki	6	6
(Sweden) S Aspelin (South Africa) W Moodie	7	7
3	(Czech Republic) L Dlouhý (India) L Paes	6^{5}	6^{3}
5	(Brazil) B Soares (Zimbabwe) K Ullyett	6	6
WC	(Spain) G Alcaide (Spain) A Martín	3	2
(Austria) J Knowle (Austria) J Melzer	6^{3}	1
2	(Canada) D Nestor (Serbia) N Zimonjić	7	6

Quarterfinals
(Czech Republic) R Štěpánek (Serbia) V Troicki	4	3
(Sweden) S Aspelin (South Africa) W Moodie	6	6
5	(Brazil) B Soares (Zimbabwe) K Ullyett	6	3	[7]
2	(Canada) D Nestor (Serbia) N Zimonjić	1	6	[10]

Semifinals
(Sweden) S Aspelin (South Africa) W Moodie	6^{1}	6^{8}
2	(Canada) D Nestor (Serbia) N Zimonjić	7	7
