= 2010 Barcelona Open Banco Sabadell – Doubles =

Doubles
- 2010 Barcelona Open Banco Sabadell

Final
- Champions: (Canada) Daniel Nestor (Serbia) Nenad Zimonjić
- Runners-up: (Australia) Lleyton Hewitt (The Bahamas) Mark Knowles
- Score: 4–6, 6–3, [10–6]

Details
- Draw: 24 (2WC/2Alt)
- Seeds: 8

Events
Singles	Doubles
← 2009 ·	Barcelona Open	· 2011 →

Daniel Nestor and Nenad Zimonjić defend their 2009 title. They defeated Lleyton Hewitt and Mark Knowles in the final 4–6, 6–3, [10–6].

== Seeds ==
All seeds receive a bye into the second round.

1. (Canada) Daniel Nestor / (Serbia) Nenad Zimonjić (champions)
2. (United States) Bob Bryan / (United States) Mike Bryan (quarterfinals)
3. (Czech Republic) Lukáš Dlouhý / (India) Leander Paes (second round)
4. (South Africa) Wesley Moodie / (Belgium) Dick Norman (second round)
5. (India) ~~Mahesh Bhupathi~~ / (Belarus) ~~Max Mirnyi~~ (withdrew, Bhupathi left leg injury)
6. (Poland) Łukasz Kubot / (Austria) Oliver Marach (second round)
7. (Czech Republic) František Čermák / (Slovakia) Michal Mertiňák (second round)
8. (Poland) Mariusz Fyrstenberg / (Poland) Marcin Matkowski (semifinals)

== Draw ==
=== Key ===
- Q = Qualifier
- WC = Wild card
- LL = Lucky loser
- Alt = Alternate
- SE = Special exempt
- PR = Protected ranking
- ITF = ITF entry
- JE = Junior exempt
- w/o = Walkover
- r = Retired
- d = Defaulted
- SR = Special ranking

=== Finals ===
Semifinals
1	(Canada) Daniel Nestor (Serbia) Nenad Zimonjić	6	3	[10]
(Austria) Julian Knowle (Israel) Andy Ram	4	6	[7]
(Australia) Lleyton Hewitt (The Bahamas) Mark Knowles	6	3	[10]
8	(Poland) Mariusz Fyrstenberg (Poland) Marcin Matkowski	2	6	[7]

Final
1	(Canada) Daniel Nestor (Serbia) Nenad Zimonjić	4	6	[10]
(Australia) Lleyton Hewitt (The Bahamas) Mark Knowles	6	3	[6]

=== Top half ===
First round
(Australia) J Kerr (Sweden) R Lindstedt	7	6
(Russia) I Andreev (France) J Chardy	6^{4}	1
(United States) E Butorac (Germany) M Kohlmann	3	2
(Spain) N Almagro (Spain) M López	6	6
(Austria) J Knowle (Israel) A Ram	6	7
(Uruguay) P Cuevas (Chile) F González	4	5
(Germany) C Kas (Austria) J Melzer	6	6
WC	(Spain) G Granollers-Pujol (Spain) A Ramos-Viñolas	3	0

Second round
1	(Canada) D Nestor (Serbia) N Zimonjić	7	7
(Australia) J Kerr (Sweden) R Lindstedt	5	6^{1}
(Spain) N Almagro (Spain) M López	6	4	[11]
7	(Czech Republic) F Čermák (Slovakia) M Mertiňák	1	6	[9]
3	(Czech Republic) L Dlouhý (India) L Paes	2	0
(Austria) J Knowle (Israel) A Ram	6	6
(Germany) C Kas (Austria) J Melzer	6	6
Alt	(Argentina) JI Chela (Argentina) E Schwank	3	4

Quarterfinals
1	(Canada) D Nestor (Serbia) N Zimonjić	6^{0}	6	[10]
(Spain) N Almagro (Spain) M López	7	2	[4]
(Austria) J Knowle (Israel) A Ram	7	7
(Germany) C Kas (Austria) J Melzer	6^{4}	5

Semifinals
1	(Canada) D Nestor (Serbia) N Zimonjić	6	3	[10]
(Austria) J Knowle (Israel) A Ram	4	6	[7]

=== Bottom half ===
First round
(Australia) L Hewitt (The Bahamas) M Knowles	6	6
(Brazil) M Melo (Brazil) B Soares	4	1
(Spain) G García-López (Spain) A Montañés	7	6
(Sweden) J Brunström (Netherlands Antilles) J-J Rojer	6^{7}	3
Alt	(Germany) S Greul (Australia) P Luczak	4	2
(Brazil) T Bellucci (Argentina) H Zeballos	6	6
WC	(Spain) A Martín (Spain) F Vicente	6	2	[8]
(Slovakia) F Polášek (Pakistan) A-u-H Qureshi	4	6	[10]

Second round
6	(Poland) Ł Kubot (Austria) O Marach	4	6^{0}
(Australia) L Hewitt (The Bahamas) M Knowles	6	7
(Spain) G García-López (Spain) A Montañés	7	6
4	(South Africa) W Moodie (Belgium) D Norman	6^{2}	3
8	(Poland) M Fyrstenberg (Poland) M Matkowski	6	7
(Brazil) T Bellucci (Argentina) H Zeballos	3	6^{3}
(Slovakia) F Polášek (Pakistan) A-u-H Qureshi	4	4
2	(United States) B Bryan (United States) M Bryan	6	6

Quarterfinals
(Australia) L Hewitt (The Bahamas) M Knowles	7	6
(Spain) G García-López (Spain) A Montañés	6^{3}	3
8	(Poland) M Fyrstenberg (Poland) M Matkowski	6	6
2	(United States) B Bryan (United States) M Bryan	4	4

Semifinals
(Australia) L Hewitt (The Bahamas) M Knowles	6	3	[10]
8	(Poland) M Fyrstenberg (Poland) M Matkowski	2	6	[7]
