= 2011 Barcelona Open Banco Sabadell =

- Date: April 16 – April 24
- Edition: 59th
- Category: ATP World Tour 500
- Surface: Clay / Outdoor
- Location: Barcelona, Spain
- Venue: Real Club de Tenis Barcelona

Champions

Singles
- (Spain) Rafael Nadal

Doubles
- (Mexico) Santiago González / (United States) Scott Lipsky
← 2010 ·	Barcelona Open Banco Sabadell	· 2012 →

The 2011 Barcelona Open Banco Sabadell (also known as the Torneo Godó) was a tennis tournament played on outdoor clay courts. It was the 59th edition of the event known this year as the Barcelona Open Banco Sabadell, and was part of the ATP World Tour 500 series of the 2011 ATP World Tour. It took place at the Real Club de Tenis Barcelona in Barcelona, Spain, from April 16 through April 24, 2011. The defending champion was Fernando Verdasco, but was absent from the tournament in 2011.

== Points and prize money ==
=== Points ===
Stage	Men's singles	Men's doubles
Champion	500	
Runner up	300	
Semifinals	180	
Quarterfinals	90	
Round of 16	45	
Round of 32	20	0
Round of 64	0	–
Qualifier	10	–
Qualifying final round	4	–

=== Prize money ===
The Barcelona Open Banc Sabadell has slightly raised the prize money for this year's edition, which turns it into one of the highest paid tennis tournaments in its category. The singles winner will go home with €290,000 (€4,000 more than last year).

Stage	Men's singles (€)	Men's doubles (per team) (€)
Champion	290,000	90,750
Runner up	145,750	45,700
Semifinals	73,850	23,160
Quarterfinals	37,450	11,750
Round of 16	19,230	6,020
Round of 32	10,110	3,170
Round of 64	6,075	-
Qualifying final round	610	-
Qualifying first round	300	-

== Entrants ==
=== Seeds ===
Country	Player	Rank^{1}	Seed
ESP	Rafael Nadal	1	1
GBR	~~Andy Murray~~	~~4~~	~~2~~
SWE	Robin Söderling	5	3
ESP	David Ferrer	6	4
CZE	~~Tomáš Berdych~~	~~7~~	~~5~~
AUT	Jürgen Melzer	9	6
FRA	Gaël Monfils	10	7
ESP	Nicolás Almagro	12	8
FRA	Richard Gasquet	18	9
UKR	Alexandr Dolgopolov	21	10
ESP	Albert Montañés	23	11
ESP	Guillermo García López	27	12
BRA	Thomaz Bellucci	31	13
RSA	Kevin Anderson	33	14
CAN	Milos Raonic	34	15
ARG	Juan Mónaco	36	16

- Rankings as of April 11, 2011.

=== Other entrants ===
The following players received wildcards into the main draw:

- (Argentina) Juan Mónaco
- (Spain) Albert Ramos
- (Spain) Gerard Granollers
- (Spain) Pablo Carreño Busta
- (Russia) Andrey Kuznetsov

The following players received entry from the qualifying draw:

- (Italy) Flavio Cipolla
- (Germany) Simon Greul
- (France) Vincent Millot
- (Finland) Jarkko Nieminen
- (France) Benoît Paire
- (France) Édouard Roger-Vasselin
- (Italy) Simone Vagnozzi

The following players received entry from a Lucky loser spot:

- (Portugal) Rui Machado
- (Germany) Mischa Zverev

=== Notable withdrawals ===
- (Spain) Tommy Robredo (hamstring injury)
- (Czech Republic) Tomáš Berdych (gastroenteritis)
- (United Kingdom) Andy Murray (elbow injury)

== Champions ==
=== Singles ===
(Spain) Rafael Nadal def. (Spain) David Ferrer, 6–2, 6–4

- It was Nadal's 2nd title of the year and 45th of his career. It was his 6th title at Barcelona, also winning from 2005 to 2009.

=== Doubles ===
(Mexico) Santiago González / (United States) Scott Lipsky def. (United States) Bob Bryan / (United States) Mike Bryan, 5–7, 6–2, [12–10]
