= 1950 Wimbledon Championships – Mixed doubles =

Mixed doubles
- 1950 Wimbledon Championships

Final
- Champions: (South Africa) Eric Sturgess (United States) Louise Brough
- Runners-up: (Australia) Geoff Brown (United States) Pat Todd
- Score: 11–9, 1–6, 6–4

Details
- Draw: 80 (5Q)
- Seeds: 4

Events
Singles	men	women		boys	girls
Doubles	men	women	mixed	boys	girls
- Wimbledon Championships

Eric Sturgess and Sheila Summers were the defending champions but Summers did not compete. Sturgess partnered with Louise Brough and they defeated Geoff Brown and Pat Todd in the final, 11–9, 1–6, 6–4 to win the mixed doubles tennis title at the 1950 Wimbledon Championships.

== Seeds ==
1. (South Africa) Eric Sturgess / (United States) Louise Brough (champions)
2. (United States) Bill Talbert / (United States) Margaret duPont (fourth round)
3. (Australia) Frank Sedgman / (United States) Doris Hart (semifinals)
4. (Australia) Geoff Brown / (United States) Pat Todd (final)

Click on the seed number of a player to go to their draw section.

== Draw ==
Key

- Q = Qualifier
- WC = Wild card
- LL = Lucky loser
- Alt = Alternate
- ITF = ITF entry
- PR = Protected ranking
- SR = Special ranking
- SE = Special exempt
- JE = Junior exempt
- JR = Junior Accelerator Programme entrant
- CO = College Accelerator Programme entrant
- NG = Next Gen Accelerator Program entrant
- w/o = Walkover
- r = Retired
- d = Defaulted

=== Finals ===
Quarterfinals
(Australia) Adrian Quist (United States) Gussie Moran	6	1
(Australia) George Worthington (Australia) Thelma Long	8	6
4	(Australia) Geoff Brown (United States) Pat Todd	6	6
(Australia) John Bromwich (United Kingdom) Betty Harrison	3	4
(United Kingdom) Geoffrey Paish (United Kingdom) Jean Quertier	4	1
3	(Australia) Frank Sedgman (United States) Doris Hart	6	6
(Argentina) Enrique Morea (United States) Barbara Scofield	3	11
1	(South Africa) Eric Sturgess (United States) Louise Brough	6	13

Semifinals
(Australia) George Worthington (Australia) Thelma Long	7	4
4	(Australia) Geoff Brown (United States) Pat Todd	9	6
3	(Australia) Frank Sedgman (United States) Doris Hart	2	7
1	(South Africa) Eric Sturgess (United States) Louise Brough	6	9

Final
4	(Australia) Geoff Brown (United States) Pat Todd	9	6	4
1	(South Africa) Eric Sturgess (United States) Louise Brough	11	1	6

=== Top half ===
==== Section 1 ====
First round

Second round
2	(United States) Bill Talbert (United States) Margaret duPont	6	4	6
(Australia) Mervyn Rose (United Kingdom) Kay Tuckey	4	6	3
(United Kingdom) Henry Billington (United Kingdom) Susan Billington	6	6
(United Kingdom) Howard Walton (United Kingdom) Joy Hibbert	4	0
(Socialist Federal Republic of Yugoslavia) Dragutin Mitić (United Kingdom) Pat Ward	6	3	6
(Philippines) Felicisimo Ampon (United Kingdom) Freda Hammersley	0	6	3
(France) Jean Borotra (France) Colette Boegner	4	5
(Australia) Adrian Quist (United States) Gussie Moran	6	7

Third round
2	(United States) W Talbert (United States) M duPont	6	6
(United Kingdom) H Billington (United Kingdom) S Billington	3	2
(Socialist Federal Republic of Yugoslavia) D Mitić (United Kingdom) P Ward	3	5
(Australia) A Quist (United States) G Moran	6	7

Fourth round
2	(United States) W Talbert (United States) M duPont	3	2
(Australia) A Quist (United States) G Moran	6	6

==== Section 2 ====
First round

Second round
(United Kingdom) Jack Deloford (United Kingdom) Joan Curry	3	6	3
(Australia) Harry Hopman (United Kingdom) Peggy Dawson-Scott	6	4	6
(India) Dilip Bose (United Kingdom) Myra Brain	0	1
(Australia) George Worthington (Australia) Thelma Long	6	6
(United Kingdom) Tony Mottram (United Kingdom) Joy Mottram	6	6
(Republic of Ireland) Cyril Kemp (Republic of Ireland) Betty Lombard	2	4
(United Kingdom) GI Bayley (United Kingdom) Betty Coutts	6	5	1
(Egypt) Marcel Coen (United Kingdom) Alex McKelvie	2	7	6

Third round
(Australia) H Hopman (United Kingdom) P Dawson-Scott	3	8
(Australia) G Worthington (Australia) T Long	6	10
(United Kingdom) A Mottram (United Kingdom) J Mottram	6	6
(Egypt) M Coen (United Kingdom) A McKelvie	3	4

Fourth round
(Australia) G Worthington (Australia) T Long	6	3	6
(United Kingdom) A Mottram (United Kingdom) J Mottram	3	6	2

==== Section 3 ====
First round

Second round
4	(Australia) Geoff Brown (United States) Pat Todd	6	6
(Iran) Matthew Mohtadi (Israel) Gertrude Kornfeld	0	2
Q	(United Kingdom) Leslie Cater (United Kingdom) Leonie Brighton	6	1	6
(Sweden) Torsten Johansson (Sweden) Birgit Gullbrandsson-Sandén	3	6	3
(Belgium) Philippe Washer (Argentina) Mary Terán de Weiss	6	3	5
(Australia) Bill Sidwell (United States) Helen Rihbany	3	6	7
(Republic of Ireland) George McVeagh (United Kingdom) Gay Chandler	8	0
(France) Philippe Chatrier (France) Gilberte Jamain	10	6

Third round
4	(Australia) G Brown (United States) P Todd	6	6
Q	(United Kingdom) L Cater (United Kingdom) L Brighton	4	4
(Australia) W Sidwell (United States) H Rihbany	6	6
(France) P Chatrier (France) G Jamain	3	1

Fourth round
4	(Australia) G Brown (United States) P Todd	6	6
(Australia) W Sidwell (United States) H Rihbany	4	0

==== Section 4 ====
First round
(India) Naresh Kumar (United Kingdom) Margaret Knott	6	5	3
(India) Narendra Nath (United Kingdom) Elsie Phillips	4	7	6
Q	(United Kingdom) Ron Statham (United Kingdom) Helen Fletcher	3	1
(Australia) John Bromwich (United Kingdom) Betty Harrison	6	6
(Poland) Czesław Spychała (United Kingdom) Bea Walter	3	6	9
(Czechoslovakia) Milan Matouš (Czechoslovakia) Helena Matouš	6	4	11
(United Kingdom) Herman David (United Kingdom) Nancy Glover	1	3
(Belgium) Jacques Brichant (United States) Gloria Butler	6	6
(France) Jacques Sanglier (France) Maud Galtier	9	9
Q	(United Kingdom) Tommy Anderson (United Kingdom) Susan Partridge	7	7
(Netherlands) Hubert Wilton (Netherlands) Mrs MA Schmier	6	4	6
Q	(United Kingdom) Mike Lloyd (United Kingdom) Joey David	1	6	2
(Italy) Rolando del Bello (Belgium) Francine Isaac	2	6	7
(United Kingdom) Cliff Hovell (United Kingdom) Georgie Woodgate	6	2	5
(Norway) Johan Haanes (South Africa) Doreen Wedderburn	4	3
(Italy) Giulio Caccia (Italy) Annelise Bossi	6	6

Second round
(India) N Nath (United Kingdom) E Phillips	2	1
(Australia) J Bromwich (United Kingdom) E Harrison	6	6
(Czechoslovakia) M Matouš (Czechoslovakia) H Matouš	7	6	6
(Belgium) J Brichant (United States) G Butler	9	2	4
(France) J Sanglier (France) M Galtier	1	1
(Netherlands) H Wilton (Netherlands) Mrs MA Schmier	6	6
(Italy) R del Bello (Belgium) F Isaac	3	5
(Italy) G Caccia (Italy) A Bossi	6	7

Third round
(Australia) J Bromwich (United Kingdom) E Harrison	6	6
(Czechoslovakia) M Matouš (Czechoslovakia) H Matouš	2	1
(Netherlands) H Wilton (Netherlands) Mrs MA Schmier	6	6
(Italy) G Caccia (Italy) A Bossi	3	4

Fourth round
(Australia) J Bromwich (United Kingdom) E Harrison	6	6
(Netherlands) H Wilton (Netherlands) Mrs MA Schmier	2	2

=== Bottom half ===
==== Section 5 ====
First round
(United States) Budge Patty (United States) Nancy Chaffee	6	6
(Egypt) Mahmoud Talaat (United Kingdom) Edith Middleton	1	4
(United Kingdom) Headley Baxter (United Kingdom) Vera Thomas	7	4
(United Kingdom) Don Butler (United Kingdom) Jean Walker-Smith	9	6
(France) Alain Lemyze (France) Myrtil Dubois	3	6	3
(United Kingdom) John Horn (United Kingdom) Billie Woodgate	6	2	6
(Netherlands) Hans van Swol (United States) Nancy Morrison	4	8
(Netherlands) John Linck (Netherlands) Nel Hermsen	6	10
(United Kingdom) Derek Bull (United Kingdom) Effie Peters	8	3	3
(Republic of Ireland) Matthew Murphy (Republic of Ireland) Mary Fitzgibbon	6	6	6
(France) Jean Ducos de la Haille (France) Anne-Marie Seghers	3	6	3
(Australia) Peter Molloy (United States) Marta Barnett	6	3	6
(Netherlands) Ivo Rinkel (United Kingdom) Mary Halford	6	6
(Belgium) Pierre Geelhand de Merxem (United Kingdom) Betty Martin-Davies	3	2
(United Kingdom) Geoffrey Paish (United Kingdom) Jean Quertier	6	6
(Norway) Nils-Erik Hessen (Belgium) Marcelle van Leer	1	1

Second round
(United States) J Patty (United States) N Chaffee	6	6
(United Kingdom) D Butler (United Kingdom) J Walker-Smith	1	3
(United Kingdom) J Horn (United Kingdom) R Woodgate	4	3
(Netherlands) J Linck (Netherlands) P Hermsen	6	6
(Republic of Ireland) M Murphy (Republic of Ireland) M Fitzgibbon	3	2
(Australia) P Molloy (United States) M Barnett	6	6
(Netherlands) I Rinkel (United Kingdom) M Halford	4	3
(United Kingdom) G Paish (United Kingdom) J Quertier	6	6

Third round
(United States) J Patty (United States) N Chaffee	6	6
(Netherlands) J Linck (Netherlands) P Hermsen	1	3
(Australia) P Molloy (United States) M Barnett	1	2
(United Kingdom) G Paish (United Kingdom) J Quertier	6	6

Fourth round
(United States) J Patty (United States) N Chaffee	w/o
(United Kingdom) G Paish (United Kingdom) J Quertier

==== Section 6 ====
First round

Second round
(Argentina) Heraldo Weiss (United States) Dorothy Head	6	6
(Republic of Ireland) Raymond Egan (Republic of Ireland) Maeve Brennan	0	1
(South Africa) Brian Rooke (United Kingdom) Enid Andrews	6	4	2
(United Kingdom) Gerry Oakley (United Kingdom) Barbara Knapp	3	6	6
Q	(United Kingdom) Dick Guise (United Kingdom) Pam Bocquet	6	2
(New Zealand) Dennis Coombe (United Kingdom) Betty Wilford	8	6
(France) Christian Grandet (France) Andrée Varin	2	1
3	(Australia) Frank Sedgman (United States) Doris Hart	6	6

Third round
(Argentina) H Weiss (United States) D Head	6	6
(United Kingdom) G Oakley (United Kingdom) B Knapp	3	2
(New Zealand) D Coombe (United Kingdom) E Wilford	6	5
3	(Australia) F Sedgman (United States) D Hart	8	7

Fourth round
(Argentina) H Weiss (United States) D Head	1	3
3	(Australia) F Sedgman (United States) D Hart	6	6

==== Section 7 ====
First round

Second round
(Philippines) Cesar Carmona (United Kingdom) Gem Hoahing	3	7	6
(United Kingdom) Claude Lister (United Kingdom) Thelma Lister	6	5	1
(France) Guy Delhomme (France) Ginette Bucaille	1	4
(Australia) Ken McGregor (United States) Shirley Fry	6	6
(Argentina) Enrique Morea (United States) Barbara Scofield	6	6
(India) Subba Sawhney (United States) Rita Anderson	2	2
(United States) Vic Seixas (United States) Betty Rosenquest	6	6
(Switzerland) Paul Blondel (Switzerland) Violette Rigollet	1	2

Third round
(Philippines) C Carmona (United Kingdom) C Hoahing	2	0
(Australia) K McGregor (United States) S Fry	6	6
(Argentina) E Morea (United States) B Scofield	7	6
(United States) V Seixas (United States) E Rosenquest	5	3

Fourth round
(Australia) K McGregor (United States) S Fry	12	3	2
(Argentina) E Morea (United States) B Scofield	10	6	6

==== Section 8 ====
First round

Second round
(India) Sumant Misra (India) Hyacinth Cargin	4	6	6
(United Kingdom) Eric Filby (United Kingdom) Pat Cowney	6	4	2
(Italy) Vanni Canepele (Italy) Lucia Manfredi	1	6	6
(Austria) Freddie Huber (Austria) Etta Neumann	6	4	3
(Sweden) Sven Davidson (Sweden) Mary Lagerborg	6	4	12
(United Kingdom) Eddie Ford (United Kingdom) Patsy Rodgers	3	6	10
(South Africa) David Lurie (South Africa) Solveig Glietenberg	4	1
1	(South Africa) Eric Sturgess (United States) Louise Brough	6	6

Third round
(India) S Misra (India) H Cargin	6	6
(Italy) G Canepele (Italy) L Manfredi	3	4
(Sweden) S Davidson (Sweden) M Lagerborg	0	1
1	(South Africa) E Sturgess (United States) L Brough	6	6

Fourth round
(India) S Misra (India) H Cargin	4	1
1	(South Africa) E Sturgess (United States) L Brough	6	6
