= 1950 Wimbledon Championships – Men's doubles =

Men's doubles
- 1950 Wimbledon Championships

Final
- Champions: (Australia) John Bromwich (Australia) Adrian Quist
- Runners-up: (Australia) Geoff Brown (Australia) Bill Sidwell
- Score: 7–5, 3–6, 6–3, 3–6, 6–2

Details
- Draw: 64 (5Q)
- Seeds: 4

Events
Singles	men	women		boys	girls
Doubles	men	women	mixed	boys	girls
- Wimbledon Championships

Pancho Gonzales and Frank Parker were the defending champions, but were ineligible to compete after turning professional.

John Bromwich and Adrian Quist defeated Geoff Brown and Bill Sidwell in the final, 7–5, 3–6, 6–3, 3–6, 6–2 to win the gentlemen's doubles tennis title at the 1950 Wimbledon Championship.

== Seeds ==
1. (United States) Gardnar Mulloy / (United States) Bill Talbert (third round)
2. (Australia) John Bromwich / (Australia) Adrian Quist (champions)
3. (Egypt) Jaroslav Drobný / (South Africa) Eric Sturgess (semifinals)
4. (Australia) Geoff Brown / (Australia) Bill Sidwell (final)

Click on the seed number of a player to go to their draw section.

== Draw ==
Key

- Q = Qualifier
- WC = Wild card
- LL = Lucky loser
- Alt = Alternate
- ITF = ITF entry
- PR = Protected ranking
- SR = Special ranking
- SE = Special exempt
- JE = Junior exempt
- JR = Junior Accelerator Programme entrant
- CO = College Accelerator Programme entrant
- NG = Next Gen Accelerator Program entrant
- w/o = Walkover
- r = Retired
- d = Defaulted

=== Finals ===
Quarterfinals
2	(Australia) John Bromwich (Australia) Adrian Quist	6	6	6
(Australia) Mervyn Rose (Australia) George Worthington	4	2	4
3	(Egypt) Jaroslav Drobný (South Africa) Eric Sturgess	6	6	6
(Belgium) Jacques Brichant (Belgium) Philippe Washer	2	2	4
(Czechoslovakia) Vladimír Černík (Czechoslovakia) Milan Matouš	5	2	1
4	(Australia) Geoff Brown (Australia) Bill Sidwell	7	6	6
(United States) Budge Patty (United States) Tony Trabert	6	31	7	6
(Australia) Ken McGregor (Australia) Frank Sedgman	4	29	9	2

Semifinals
2	(Australia) John Bromwich (Australia) Adrian Quist	6	3	6	6
3	(Egypt) Jaroslav Drobný (South Africa) Eric Sturgess	4	6	3	4
4	(Australia) Geoff Brown (Australia) Bill Sidwell	6	6	6
(United States) Budge Patty (United States) Tony Trabert	4	4	3

Final
2	(Australia) John Bromwich (Australia) Adrian Quist	7	3	6	3	6
4	(Australia) Geoff Brown (Australia) Bill Sidwell	5	6	4	6	2

=== Top half ===
==== Section 1 ====
First round
2	(Australia) John Bromwich (Australia) Adrian Quist	6	6	6
Q	(Dominion of Ceylon) Doug Scharenguivel (United Kingdom) Tony Starte	0	0	2
Q	(United Kingdom) Ralph Nichols (United Kingdom) Bert Whitney	4	3	6	3
(United Kingdom) Peter Anderson (United Kingdom) Dick Guise	6	6	3	6
(Republic of Ireland) Cyril Kemp (Republic of Ireland) George McVeagh	2	3	3
(Sweden) Torsten Johansson (Argentina) Enrique Morea	6	6	6
(Netherlands) Ivo Rinkel (Netherlands) Hans van Swol	6	6	6
(Poland) Czesław Spychała (Poland) Ignacy Tłoczyński	0	2	2
(United States) Fred Kovaleski (United States) Vic Seixas	3	4	6
(Australia) Mervyn Rose (Australia) George Worthington	6	6	8
(United Kingdom) Derek Bull (United Kingdom) Stan Clark	1	8	5	2
(United Kingdom) Gerry Oakley (India) Subba Sawhney	6	6	7	6
(France) Jean Borotra (France) Bernard Destremau
(India) Dilip Bose (India) Sumant Misra	w/o
(United Kingdom) Freddie Della Porta (United Kingdom) Harley Watkins	1	7	6	5	3
(Austria) Freddie Huber (Austria) Hans Redl	6	5	4	7	6

Second round
2	(Australia) J Bromwich (Australia) A Quist	6	6	6
(United Kingdom) P Anderson (United Kingdom) R Guise	3	4	1
(Sweden) T Johansson (Argentina) E Morea	11	4	6	6
(Netherlands) I Rinkel (Netherlands) A van Swol	9	6	4	4
(Australia) M Rose (Australia) G Worthington	6	6	6
(United Kingdom) G Oakley (India) S Sawhney	2	2	4
(France) J Borotra (France) B Destremau	6	3	9	6
(Austria) A Huber (Austria) H Redl	3	6	7	4

Third round
2	(Australia) J Bromwich (Australia) A Quist	6	6	6
(Sweden) T Johansson (Argentina) E Morea	2	2	2
(Australia) M Rose (Australia) G Worthington	6	6	7
(France) J Borotra (France) B Destremau	3	2	5

Quarterfinals
2	(Australia) J Bromwich (Australia) A Quist	6	6	6
(Australia) M Rose (Australia) G Worthington	4	2	4

==== Section 2 ====
First round
3	(Egypt) Jaroslav Drobný (South Africa) Eric Sturgess	6	6	6
(United Kingdom) Roland Carter (United Kingdom) Eric Filby	0	2	2
(Netherlands) John Linck (Australia) Peter Molloy	6	6	9	9
(Egypt) Marcel Coen (France) Christian Grandet	2	3	11	7
Q	(United Kingdom) Tony Dawes (United Kingdom) Noel Rowland	3	3	2
(France) Philippe Chatrier (France) Jean-Claude Molinari	6	6	6
(Norway) Johan Haanes (Norway) Nils-Erik Hessen	3	6	6	6
(United Kingdom) Derrick Lester (United Kingdom) Bobby Thorn	6	2	0	4
(Belgium) Jacques Brichant (Belgium) Philippe Washer	6	7	4	6
(United Kingdom) Henry Billington (United Kingdom) Don Butler	4	5	6	4
(Socialist Federal Republic of Yugoslavia) Dragutin Mitić (Socialist Federal Republic of Yugoslavia) Josip Palada	4	3	6
(Italy) Giulio Caccia (Italy) Rolando del Bello	6	6	8
(New Zealand) Dennis Coombe (United Kingdom) Claude Lister	6	6	3	6
(France) Alain Lemyze (France) Francis Nys	2	1	6	4
(Philippines) Raymundo Deyro (Australia) Jack Harper	6	6	6
(United Kingdom) Headley Baxter (United Kingdom) Eddie Ford	3	4	2

Second round
3	(Egypt) J Drobný (South Africa) E Sturgess	6	6	6
(Netherlands) J Linck (Australia) P Molloy	0	2	3
(France) P Chatrier (France) J-C Molinari	7	7	2	6
(Norway) J Haanes (Norway) N-E Hessen	5	9	6	8
(Belgium) J Brichant (Belgium) P Washer	10	7	4	6	6
(Italy) G Caccia (Italy) R del Bello	8	9	6	1	4
(New Zealand) D Coombe (United Kingdom) C Lister	2	3	4
(Philippines) R Deyro (Australia) J Harper	6	6	6

Third round
3	(Egypt) J Drobný (South Africa) E Sturgess	6	6	6
(Norway) J Haanes (Norway) N-E Hessen	1	3	3
(Belgium) J Brichant (Belgium) P Washer	6	6	6
(Philippines) R Deyro (Australia) J Harper	3	4	4

Quarterfinals
3	(Egypt) J Drobný (South Africa) E Sturgess	6	6	6
(Belgium) J Brichant (Belgium) P Washer	2	2	4

=== Bottom half ===
==== Section 3 ====
First round
(United Kingdom) GI Bayley (United Kingdom) Guy Cooper	0	3	7	3
(Republic of Ireland) Matthew Murphy (Argentina) Heraldo Weiss	6	6	5	6
(Czechoslovakia) Vladimír Černík (Czechoslovakia) Milan Matouš
(United States) Gene Garrett (Australia) Harry Hopman	w/o
(United Kingdom) Cliff Hovell (United Kingdom) Jimmy Jones	6	8	6	10	6
Q	(United Kingdom) Laurie Proctor (United Kingdom) John White	2	10	3	12	3
(United Kingdom) Bobby Meredith (United Kingdom) Douglas Snart	9	6	3	8	2
(South Africa) David Lurie (South Africa) Brian Rooke	11	1	6	6	6
(United Kingdom) Tony Mottram (United Kingdom) Geoffrey Paish	6	6	6
(Republic of Ireland) Raymond Egan (Republic of Ireland) Joe Hackett	1	1	1
(Socialist Federal Republic of Yugoslavia) Milan Branović (Socialist Federal Republic of Yugoslavia) Petko Milojković	w/o
(Sweden) Lennart Bergelin (Sweden) Sven Davidson
(Belgium) Pierre Geelhand de Merxem (Belgium) Jacques Peten	1	1	4
(India) Naresh Kumar (India) Narendra Nath	6	6	6
(Egypt) Adli El Shafei (Egypt) Mahmoud Talaat	0	0	1
4	(Australia) Geoff Brown (Australia) Bill Sidwell	6	6	6

Second round
(Republic of Ireland) M Murphy (Argentina) H Weiss	6	6	3	6	7
(Czechoslovakia) V Černík (Czechoslovakia) M Matouš	8	4	6	1	9
(United Kingdom) C Hovell (United Kingdom) C Jones	6	6	10	6
(South Africa) D Lurie (South Africa) B Rooke	3	4	12	4
(United Kingdom) A Mottram (United Kingdom) G Paish	9	3	4
(Sweden) L Bergelin (Sweden) S Davidson	11	6	6
(India) N Kumar (India) N Nath	5	3	2
4	(Australia) G Brown (Australia) W Sidwell	7	6	6

Third round
(Czechoslovakia) V Černík (Czechoslovakia) M Matouš	6	2	6	6
(United Kingdom) C Hovell (United Kingdom) C Jones	1	6	4	4
(Sweden) L Bergelin (Sweden) S Davidson	6	3	6	11
4	(Australia) G Brown (Australia) W Sidwell	4	6	8	13

Quarterfinals
(Czechoslovakia) V Černík (Czechoslovakia) M Matouš	5	2	1
4	(Australia) G Brown (Australia) W Sidwell	7	6	6

==== Section 4 ====
First round
(United Kingdom) John Barrett (United Kingdom) John Horn	4	4	6
(United States) Budge Patty (United States) Tony Trabert	6	6	8
(Denmark) Kurt Nielsen (Denmark) Torben Ulrich	4	2	6	7
(United Kingdom) Leslie Cater (United Kingdom) Francis Wallis	6	6	3	9
(Netherlands) Hubert Wilton (Netherlands) Boebi van Meegeren	7	3	5	6
(France) Jean Ducos de la Haille (France) Robert Haillet	5	6	7	8
Q	(United Kingdom) John Fulton (United Kingdom) John Rutherglen	4	2	3
(United Kingdom) Peter Hare (United Kingdom) Howard Walton	6	6	6
(United Kingdom) George Godsell (United Kingdom) Ted Tinling	2	1	2
(Philippines) Felicisimo Ampon (Philippines) Cesar Carmona	6	6	6
(Australia) Ken McGregor (Australia) Frank Sedgman	7	6	9
(United Kingdom) Edmund David (United Kingdom) Herman David	5	0	7
(Italy) Vanni Canepele (Italy) Giuliano Scribani	0	6	7	0
(United States) Irvin Dorfman (United States) Art Larsen	6	4	9	6
(France) Guy Delhomme (France) Jacques Sanglier	1	1	0
1	(United States) Gardnar Mulloy (United States) Bill Talbert	6	6	6

Second round
(United States) J Patty (United States) A Trabert	6	6	6
(United Kingdom) L Cater (United Kingdom) F Wallis	3	4	4
(France) J Ducos de la Haille (France) R Haillet	6	4	2	1
(United Kingdom) P Hare (United Kingdom) H Walton	4	6	6	6
(Philippines) F Ampon (Philippines) C Carmona	2	6	4
(Australia) K McGregor (Australia) F Sedgman	6	8	6
(United States) I Dorfman (United States) A Larsen	4	6	3	4
1	(United States) G Mulloy (United States) W Talbert	6	3	6	6

Third round
(United States) J Patty (United States) A Trabert	6	6	6
(United Kingdom) P Hare (United Kingdom) H Walton	4	2	2
(Australia) K McGregor (Australia) F Sedgman	8	8	8	10
1	(United States) G Mulloy (United States) W Talbert	6	6	10	8

Quarterfinals
(United States) J Patty (United States) A Trabert	6	31	7	6
(Australia) K McGregor (Australia) F Sedgman	4	29	9	2
