= 1950 Wimbledon Championships – Men's singles =

Men's singles
- 1950 Wimbledon Championships

Final
- Champion: (United States) Budge Patty
- Runner-up: (Australia) Frank Sedgman
- Score: 6–1, 8–10, 6–2, 6–3

Details
- Draw: 128 (10 Q )
- Seeds: 16

Events
Singles	men	women		boys	girls
Doubles	men	women	mixed	boys	girls
← 1949 ·	Wimbledon Championships	· 1951 →

Budge Patty defeated Frank Sedgman in the final, 6–1, 8–10, 6–2, 6–3 to win the gentlemen's singles tennis title at the 1950 Wimbledon Championships. Ted Schroeder was the defending champion, but decided not to play.

== Seeds ==
1. (Australia) Frank Sedgman (final)
2. (United States) Bill Talbert (quarterfinals)
3. (Egypt) Jaroslav Drobný (semifinals)
4. (South Africa) Eric Sturgess (quarterfinals)
5. (United States) Budge Patty (champion)
6. (United States) Gardnar Mulloy (quarterfinals)
7. (United States) Art Larsen (quarterfinals)
8. (Australia) John Bromwich (fourth round)
9. (Australia) Geoff Brown (fourth round)
10. (Australia) Ken McGregor (fourth round)
11. (Australia) Bill Sidwell (fourth round)
12. (United States) Vic Seixas (semifinals)
13. (United States) Fred Kovaleski (fourth round)
14. (United States) Irvin Dorfman (third round)
15. (India) Dilip Bose (second round)
16. (Italy) Giovanni Cucelli (withdrew)

Click on the seed number of a player to go to their draw section.

Giovanni Cucelli withdrew due to injury. He was replaced in the draw by qualifier Athol Tills.

== Draw ==
=== Key ===
- Q = Qualifier
- WC = Wild card
- LL = Lucky loser
- Alt = Alternate
- ITF = ITF entry
- PR = Protected ranking
- SR = Special ranking
- SE = Special exempt
- JE = Junior exempt
- JR = Junior Accelerator Programme entrant
- CO = College Accelerator Programme entrant
- NG = Next Gen Accelerator Program entrant
- w/o = Walkover
- r = Retired
- d = Defaulted

=== Finals ===
Quarterfinals
1	(Australia) Frank Sedgman	8	5	7	6	7
7	(United States) Art Larsen	10	7	5	3	5
3	(Egypt) Jaroslav Drobný	6	6	6
6	(United States) Gardnar Mulloy	3	4	4
12	(United States) Vic Seixas	9	6	3	6	7
4	(South Africa) Eric Sturgess	7	8	6	2	5
5	(United States) Budge Patty	3	6	6	6
2	(United States) Bill Talbert	6	4	2	3

Semifinals
1	(Australia) Frank Sedgman	3	3	6	7	6
3	(Egypt) Jaroslav Drobný	6	6	3	5	2
12	(United States) Vic Seixas	3	7	2	5
5	(United States) Budge Patty	6	5	6	7

Final
1	(Australia) Frank Sedgman	1	10	2	3
5	(United States) Budge Patty	6	8	6	6

=== Top half ===
==== Section 1 ====
First round
1	(Australia) Frank Sedgman	6	7	6
(United Kingdom) Howard Walton	4	5	4
Q	(France) Robert Haillet	4	6	4	6	6
(United Kingdom) Dick Guise	6	2	6	1	3
(Spain) Fernando Olozaga	2	0	1
(Italy) Giulio Caccia	6	6	6
(Belgium) Philippe Washer
(Australia) Jack Harper	w/o
13	(United States) Fred Kovaleski	6	7	9	6
(United Kingdom) Ron Reeve	2	5	11	2
(United Kingdom) Headley Baxter	6	7	6
(Belgium) Jacques Delire	3	5	0
(France) Jacques Sanglier	4	1	0
(India) Narendra Nath	6	6	6
Q	(Hungary) András Kálmán	3	1	2
(France) Guy Delhomme	6	6	6

Second round
1	(Australia) F Sedgman	6	8	6
Q	(France) R Haillet	4	6	2
(Italy) G Caccia	6	3	4
(Belgium) P Washer	8	6	6
13	(United States) F Kovaleski	3	6	6	6
(United Kingdom) H Baxter	6	2	2	4
(India) N Nath	6	6	6
(France) G Delhomme	1	2	3

Third round
1	(Australia) F Sedgman	6	6	6
(Belgium) P Washer	3	2	3
13	(United States) F Kovaleski	6	8	6
(India) N Nath	4	6	3

Fourth round
1	(Australia) F Sedgman	6	6	6
13	(United States) F Kovaleski	3	3	4

==== Section 2 ====
First round
7	(United States) Art Larsen	8	7	6
(Czechoslovakia) Vladimír Černík	6	5	2
(Sweden) Lennart Bergelin	6	6	6
(Republic of Ireland) Cyril Kemp	2	3	4
Q	(United Kingdom) Reg Kaley	2	6	4	6	5
(Australia) Peter Molloy	6	4	6	4	7
Q	(New Zealand) William Smith	4	6	6	6
(Egypt) Eddie Mandelbaum	6	1	4	2
Q	(New Zealand) Athol Tills	7	3	3	7	2
(Philippines) Cesar Carmona	5	6	6	5	6
(United Kingdom) Eddie Ford	6	4	7	3	4
(Netherlands) Boebi van Meegeren	2	6	5	6	6
(United Kingdom) Jimmy Jones	6	6	0
(France) Jean-Claude Molinari	8	8	6
(United Kingdom) Cliff Hovell	7	6	8
(Socialist Federal Republic of Yugoslavia) Petko Milojković	5	3	6

Second round
7	(United States) A Larsen	6	5	7	7
(Sweden) L Bergelin	3	7	5	5
(Australia) P Molloy	8	6	2	6
Q	(New Zealand) W Smith	6	0	6	3
(Philippines) C Carmona	6	7	3	6
(Netherlands) R van Meegeren	4	5	6	1
(France) J-C Molinari	6	7	6
(United Kingdom) C Hovell	3	5	4

Third round
7	(United States) A Larsen	6	6	7
(Australia) P Molloy	2	3	5
(Philippines) C Carmona	5	6	2	2
(France) J-C Molinari	7	1	6	6

Fourth round
7	(United States) A Larsen	6	6	6
(France) J-C Molinari	1	3	1

==== Section 3 ====
First round
3	(Egypt) Jaroslav Drobný	6	6	6
(France) Christian Grandet	4	3	1
(United Kingdom) Lawrence Dundas	4	5	2
(United Kingdom) Don Butler	6	7	6
(Netherlands) Ivo Rinkel	1	1	0
(Philippines) Felicisimo Ampon	6	6	6
(Denmark) Torben Ulrich	6	6	7
Q	(United Kingdom) John Rutherglen	4	4	5
10	(Australia) Ken McGregor	6	6	7
(United Kingdom) Douglas Snart	0	3	5
(United Kingdom) Eric Filby	5	2	3
(United Kingdom) Tony Starte	7	6	6
(Norway) Jan Staubo	6	4	9	5	2
(Austria) Freddie Huber	2	6	7	7	6
(Poland) Ignacy Tłoczyński	6	6	6
(Belgium) Pierre Geelhand de Merxem	4	4	1

Second round
3	(Egypt) J Drobný	6	6	6
(United Kingdom) D Butler	4	2	4
(Philippines) F Ampon	6	6	6	6
(Denmark) T Ulrich	8	3	0	4
10	(Australia) K McGregor	6	6	6
(United Kingdom) A Starte	1	3	3
(Austria) A Huber	6	7	8
(Poland) I Tłoczyński	3	5	6

Third round
3	(Egypt) J Drobný	6	6	6
(Philippines) F Ampon	3	4	2
10	(Australia) K McGregor	6	6	6
(Austria) A Huber	1	2	3

Fourth round
3	(Egypt) J Drobný	6	6	7
10	(Australia) K McGregor	3	2	5

==== Section 4 ====
First round
6	(United States) Gardnar Mulloy	3	6	6	6
(Socialist Federal Republic of Yugoslavia) Josip Palada	6	1	1	1
(United Kingdom) George Godsell	2	6	3	2
(India) Naresh Kumar	6	3	6	6
(Republic of Ireland) Joe Hackett	6	2	3	0
(United Kingdom) Geoffrey Paish	2	6	6	6
(France) Bernard Destremau	6	6	6
(Poland) Czesław Spychała	2	2	4
11	(Australia) Bill Sidwell	6	6	6
(United Kingdom) Claude Lister	2	1	3
(South Africa) David Lurie	4	6	2	1
(Italy) Rolando del Bello	6	4	6	6
(Australia) Mervyn Rose	6	6	6
(Czechoslovakia) Milan Matouš	3	4	4
(Argentina) Heraldo Weiss	6	6	6	6
(Hong Kong) Ip Koon Hung	8	3	3	4

Second round
6	(United States) G Mulloy	6	6	12
(India) N Kumar	2	4	10
(United Kingdom) G Paish	4	1	4
(France) B Destremau	6	6	6
11	(Australia) W Sidwell	6	6	6
(Italy) R del Bello	4	1	2
(Australia) M Rose	6	6	7
(Argentina) H Weiss	4	4	5

Third round
6	(United States) G Mulloy	6	6	6
(France) B Destremau	3	2	3
11	(Australia) W Sidwell	9	6	4	7
(Australia) M Rose	7	4	6	5

Fourth round
6	(United States) G Mulloy	6	6	7
11	(Australia) W Sidwell	4	3	5

=== Bottom half ===
==== Section 5 ====
First round
(United Kingdom) David Mockridge	4	1	3
(Netherlands) John Linck	6	6	6
(Egypt) Andre Najar	7	6	2	1	6
(France) Benny Berthet	5	3	6	6	1
(Socialist Federal Republic of Yugoslavia) Milan Branović	6	4	1	1
(Belgium) Jacques Brichant	0	6	6	6
(Sweden) Sven Davidson	4	6	1	3
12	(United States) Vic Seixas	6	3	6	6
(United Kingdom) Bobby Meredith	3	2	1
(India) Sumant Misra	6	6	6
(Denmark) Kurt Nielsen	6	3	3
(Australia) Harry Hopman	8	6	6
(United Kingdom) Peter Hare	6	6	6
(United Kingdom) Leslie Cater	3	3	1
(Republic of Ireland) Matthew Murphy	0	2	2
8	(Australia) John Bromwich	6	6	6

Second round
(Netherlands) J Linck	6	6	6
(Egypt) A Najar	4	3	4
(Belgium) J Brichant	4	3	3
12	(United States) V Seixas	6	6	6
(India) S Misra	6	3	1	6	6
(Australia) H Hopman	1	6	6	4	8
(United Kingdom) P Hare	2	0	0
8	(Australia) J Bromwich	6	6	6

Third round
(Netherlands) J Linck	1	4	3
12	(United States) V Seixas	6	6	6
(Australia) H Hopman	0	1	3
8	(Australia) J Bromwich	6	6	6

Fourth round
12	(United States) V Seixas	6	7	4	6
8	(Australia) J Bromwich	1	5	6	3

==== Section 6 ====
First round
(United Kingdom) Tony Mottram	6	6	6
LL	(United Kingdom) Geoff Ward	0	0	1
(South Africa) Brian Rooke	4	4	2
(United States) Tony Trabert	6	6	6
(Norway) Johan Haanes	6	6	6
(United Kingdom) Roland Carter	3	3	1
(Egypt) Adli El Shafei	1	2	3
9	(Australia) Geoff Brown	6	6	6
Q	(United Kingdom) Bernard Crouch	3	2	6
(United Kingdom) Henry Billington	6	6	8
Q	(United Kingdom) Charles Fawcus	3	6	8	1	3
(Netherlands) Hubert Wilton	6	2	6	6	6
(France) Philippe Chatrier	6	2	2	6	4
(United Kingdom) Paddy Roberts	3	6	6	3	6
(United Kingdom) John Horn	0	2	0
4	(South Africa) Eric Sturgess	6	6	6

Second round
(United Kingdom) A Mottram	6	6	6
(United States) A Trabert	1	4	1
(Norway) J Haanes	8	2	3
9	(Australia) G Brown	10	6	6
(United Kingdom) H Billington	6	7	11
(Netherlands) H Wilton	1	5	9
(United Kingdom) A Roberts	5	4	1
4	(South Africa) E Sturgess	7	6	6

Third round
(United Kingdom) A Mottram	6	2	7	4	3
9	(Australia) G Brown	1	6	5	6	6
(United Kingdom) H Billington	1	3	2
4	(South Africa) E Sturgess	6	6	6

Fourth round
9	(Australia) G Brown	2	6	3	4
4	(South Africa) E Sturgess	6	3	6	6

==== Section 7 ====
First round
(Austria) Hans Redl	6	3	4	1
(Norway) Nils-Erik Hessen	3	6	6	6
Q	(Norway) Sverre Lie	6	4	6	6	7
(United Kingdom) Edmund David	8	6	3	1	5
(Netherlands) Hans van Swol	6	9	5	2	6
(Italy) Vanni Canepele	2	7	7	6	4
(Jamaica) Frank Mott-Trille	3	9	1
15	(India) Dilip Bose	6	11	6
(United Kingdom) Henry Weatherall	4	4	2
(United Kingdom) Derek Bull	6	6	6
(France) Jean Ducos de la Haille	12	6	6	6
LL	(United Kingdom) Guy Pettigrew	14	3	3	2
(United Kingdom) Francis Wallis	6	4	4	3
(India) Subba Sawhney	2	6	6	6
(Philippines) Raymundo Deyro	6	1	2	7
5	(United States) Budge Patty	3	6	6	9

Second round
(Norway) N-E Hessen	6	6	4	4
Q	(Norway) S Lie	3	8	6	6
(Netherlands) A van Swol	4	5
15	(India) D Bose	6	4^{r}
(United Kingdom) D Bull	6	6	6	6
(France) J Ducos de la Haille	3	1	8	4
(India) S Sawhney	2	0	4
5	(United States) J Patty	6	6	6

Third round
Q	(Norway) S Lie	1	2	4
(Netherlands) A van Swol	6	6	6
(United Kingdom) D Bull	3	3	5
5	(United States) J Patty	6	6	7

Fourth round
(Netherlands) A van Swol	6	4	6
5	(United States) J Patty	8	6	8

==== Section 8 ====
First round
(Australia) Adrian Quist	6	6	6
(Socialist Federal Republic of Yugoslavia) Dragutin Mitić	0	2	3
(Switzerland) Jean-Pierre Blondel	7	6	5	3
Q	(Dominion of Ceylon) Doug Scharenguivel	5	8	7	6
(Argentina) Enrique Morea	6	6	6
LL	(Romania) Alexandru Hamburger	1	3	3
(Spain) Jaime Bartrolí	0	3	2
14	(United States) Irvin Dorfman	6	6	6
(Belgium) Jacques Peten	3	0	4
(Sweden) Torsten Johansson	6	6	6
(Australia) George Worthington	7	6	6
(United Kingdom) Gerry Oakley	5	2	2
(Egypt) Marcel Coen	3	6	6	4	6
(Iran) Matthew Mohtadi	6	3	1	6	2
(United Kingdom) Norman Kitovitz	2	2	4
2	(United States) Bill Talbert	6	6	6

Second round
(Australia) A Quist	6	6	7
Q	(Dominion of Ceylon) D Scharenguivel	3	4	5
(Argentina) E Morea	4	2	4
14	(United States) I Dorfman	6	6	6
(Sweden) T Johansson	7	2	6	2	8
(Australia) G Worthington	5	6	4	6	6
(Egypt) M Coen	1	3	0
2	(United States) W Talbert	6	6	6

Third round
(Australia) A Quist	6	6	6
14	(United States) I Dorfman	4	2	2
(Sweden) T Johansson	1	6	2	2
2	(United States) W Talbert	6	3	6	6

Fourth round
(Australia) A Quist	3	3	2
2	(United States) W Talbert	6	6	6

Preceded by 1950 French Championships	Grand Slams; Men's Singles	Succeeded by 1950 U.S. Championships
