= 1946 Wimbledon Championships – Men's doubles =

Men's doubles
- 1946 Wimbledon Championships

Final
- Champions: (United States) Tom Brown (United States) Jack Kramer
- Runners-up: (Australia) Geoff Brown (Australia) Dinny Pails
- Score: 6–4, 6–4, 6–2

Details
- Draw: 64
- Seeds: 4

Events
Singles	men	women		boys	girls
Doubles	men	women	mixed	boys	girls
- Wimbledon Championships

Elwood Cooke and Bobby Riggs were the defending champions, but were ineligible to compete after turning professional.

Tom Brown and Jack Kramer defeated Geoff Brown and Dinny Pails in the final, 6–4, 6–4, 6–2 to win the gentlemen's doubles tennis title at the 1946 Wimbledon Championship.

== Seeds ==
1. (Australia) Geoff Brown / (Australia) Dinny Pails (final)
2. (United States) Tom Brown / (United States) Jack Kramer (champions)
3. (Socialist Federal Republic of Yugoslavia) Dragutin Mitić / (Socialist Federal Republic of Yugoslavia) Josip Palada (semifinals)
4. (France) Bernard Destremau / (France) Yvon Petra (third round)

Click on the seed number of a player to go to their draw section.

== Draw ==
Key

- Q = Qualifier
- WC = Wild card
- LL = Lucky loser
- Alt = Alternate
- ITF = ITF entry
- PR = Protected ranking
- SR = Special ranking
- SE = Special exempt
- JE = Junior exempt
- JR = Junior Accelerator Programme entrant
- CO = College Accelerator Programme entrant
- NG = Next Gen Accelerator Program entrant
- w/o = Walkover
- r = Retired
- d = Defaulted

=== Finals ===
Quarterfinals
1	(Australia) Geoff Brown (Australia) Dinny Pails	6	8	6
(France) Henri Bolelli (France) Pierre Pellizza	4	6	3
3	(Socialist Federal Republic of Yugoslavia) Dragutin Mitić (Socialist Federal Republic of Yugoslavia) Josip Palada	6	6	6
(United Kingdom) Cecil Betts (United Kingdom) Cliff Hovell	3	3	2
(United States) Budge Patty (Ecuador) Pancho Segura	6	6	5	8
(Netherlands) Ivo Rinkel (Netherlands) Hans van Swol	2	4	7	6
(Sweden) Lennart Bergelin (Sweden) Torsten Johansson	1	6	4	0
2	(United States) Tom Brown (United States) Jack Kramer	6	3	6	6

Semifinals
1	(Australia) Geoff Brown (Australia) Dinny Pails	6	6	6
3	(Socialist Federal Republic of Yugoslavia) Dragutin Mitić (Socialist Federal Republic of Yugoslavia) Josip Palada	2	4	3
(United States) Budge Patty (Ecuador) Pancho Segura	3	3	3
2	(United States) Tom Brown (United States) Jack Kramer	6	6	6

Final
1	(Australia) Geoff Brown (Australia) Dinny Pails	4	4	2
2	(United States) Tom Brown (United States) Jack Kramer	6	6	6

=== Top half ===
==== Section 1 ====
First round
1	(Australia) Geoff Brown (Australia) Dinny Pails	6	6	6
(United States) Frank Beeman (United States) Stanley Drobac	2	4	1
(New Zealand) Buster Andrews (New Zealand) Dennis Coombe	8	6	6	7	6
(United Kingdom) Claude Lister (United Kingdom) WM Martin	10	4	2	9	3
(United Kingdom) Freddie Della Porta (United Kingdom) Leslie Walter	4	8	4
(United States) Frank Mehner (United States) JE Slater	6	10	6
(Poland) Czesław Spychała (Poland) Ignacy Tłoczyński	8	6	6
(United Kingdom) Edward Hansom (United Kingdom) Harold Marsland	6	2	3
(Peru) Enrique Buse (United Kingdom) Maurice Lucking	4	7	4
(Belgium) Léopold de Borman (Belgium) Jack Van den Eynde	6	9	6
(United Kingdom) Henry Billington (United Kingdom) John Olliff	6	6	6
(United Kingdom) Eric Filby (United Kingdom) Donald MacPhail	4	2	2
(France) Henri Bolelli (France) Pierre Pellizza	6	6	6
(Republic of Ireland) Raymond Egan; FW Peard	2	1	3
(United Kingdom) Derek Hardwick (United Kingdom) Peter Hare	14	3	2	2
(United Kingdom) Ted Avory (United Kingdom) Eric Peters	12	6	6	6

Second round
1	(Australia) G Brown (Australia) D Pails	6	6	6
(New Zealand) E Andrews (New Zealand) D Coombe	1	1	1
(United States) F Mehner (United States) JE Slater	4	2	2
(Poland) C Spychała (Poland) I Tłoczyński	6	6	6
(Belgium) L de Borman (Belgium) J Van den Eynde	3	7	4	6	8
(United Kingdom) H Billington (United Kingdom) J Olliff	6	5	6	4	6
(France) H Bolelli (France) P Pellizza	6	6	6
(United Kingdom) E Avory (United Kingdom) E Peters	1	1	2

Third round
1	(Australia) G Brown (Australia) D Pails	6	6	6
(Poland) C Spychała (Poland) I Tłoczyński	2	3	4
(Belgium) L de Borman (Belgium) J Van den Eynde	2	3	2
(France) H Bolelli (France) P Pellizza	6	6	6

Quarterfinals
1	(Australia) G Brown (Australia) D Pails	6	8	6
(France) H Bolelli (France) P Pellizza	4	6	3

The nationality of FW Peard is unknown.

==== Section 2 ====
First round
3	(Socialist Federal Republic of Yugoslavia) Dragutin Mitić (Socialist Federal Republic of Yugoslavia) Josip Palada	6	6	8
(United Kingdom) Brian Burnett (United Kingdom) Peter Young	2	2	6
(United Kingdom) Roland Carter (United Kingdom) Charles Kingsley	6	6	6
(United States) Bill Robertson (United States) John Wilkinson	4	2	3
(France) Paul Féret (France) Jean Lesueur	6	5	6	3
(Czechoslovakia) Josef Caska (Czechoslovakia) Jaroslav Drobný	3	7	8	6
(Chile) Andrés Hammersley (Argentina) Enrique Morea	w/o
(Australia) Alan Coldham (United Kingdom) Henry Weatherall
(United Kingdom) Cecil Betts (United Kingdom) Cliff Hovell	6	6	8	1	6
(Norway) Johan Haanes (Czechoslovakia) Ferdinand Vrba	8	4	6	6	3
(United Kingdom) CF Duncan (Poland) Maksymiljan Stolarow	w/o
(Denmark) Jaanik Ipsen (Denmark) Helge Johansen
(United Kingdom) JK Hamilton (United Kingdom) Derrick Leyland	6	6	6
(Monaco) Vladimir Landau (Monaco) Gaston Médécin	2	0	1
(Switzerland) Hans Pfaff (Switzerland) Jost Spitzer	7	5	6	6
(United Kingdom) Bernard Neal (United Kingdom) Bobby Thorn	5	7	2	2

Second round
3	(Socialist Federal Republic of Yugoslavia) D Mitić (Socialist Federal Republic of Yugoslavia) J Palada	6	6	6
(United Kingdom) R Carter (United Kingdom) C Kingsley	1	3	1
(Czechoslovakia) J Caska (Czechoslovakia) J Drobný	6	6	9
(Australia) A Coldham (United Kingdom) H Weatherall	1	2	7
(United Kingdom) C Betts (United Kingdom) C Hovell	6	6	6
(Denmark) J Ipsen (Denmark) H Johansen	2	3	4
(United Kingdom) JK Hamilton (United Kingdom) D Leyland
(Switzerland) H Pfaff (Switzerland) J Spitzer	w/o

Third round
3	(Socialist Federal Republic of Yugoslavia) D Mitić (Socialist Federal Republic of Yugoslavia) J Palada	2	9	7	3	6
(Czechoslovakia) J Caska (Czechoslovakia) J Drobný	6	7	5	6	4
(United Kingdom) C Betts (United Kingdom) C Hovell	6	6	6
(United Kingdom) JK Hamilton (United Kingdom) D Leyland	2	2	3

Quarterfinals
3	(Socialist Federal Republic of Yugoslavia) D Mitić (Socialist Federal Republic of Yugoslavia) J Palada	6	6	6
(United Kingdom) C Betts (United Kingdom) C Hovell	3	3	2

=== Bottom half ===
==== Section 3 ====
First round
(United States) Budge Patty (Ecuador) Pancho Segura	7	6	8
(United Kingdom) Herman David (Poland) Ernest Wittmann	5	1	6
(United Kingdom) Bill Manby (United Kingdom) Gwyn Tuckett
(Netherlands) Hendrik Timmer (Netherlands) Hubert Wilton	w/o
(United Kingdom) Derrick Barton (United Kingdom) Geoffrey Paish	6	6	6
(Republic of Ireland) Cyril Kemp (Republic of Ireland) George McVeagh	0	3	2
(France) Jacques Sanglier (France) Jacques Thomas	6	6	6
(United Kingdom) Tommy Anderson (Australia) DA Clayton	3	3	1
(Netherlands) Ivo Rinkel (Netherlands) Hans van Swol	9	6	6
(Switzerland) René Buser (Switzerland) Hans Huonder	7	3	4
(France) Georges Gremillet (France) Henri Pellizza	6	6	6
(United Kingdom) Guy Cooper (United Kingdom) Bob Tinkler	4	3	3
(France) Robert Abdesselam (France) Roger Dubuc	11	1	7	6
(Australia) Jack Harper (United Kingdom) Jack Warboys	9	6	5	3
(United Kingdom) Jimmy Hunt (United Kingdom) Colin Ritchie	1	2	4
4	(France) Bernard Destremau (France) Yvon Petra	6	6	6

Second round
(United States) J Patty (Ecuador) P Segura	6	6	6
(United Kingdom) N Manby (United Kingdom) G Tuckett	2	0	3
(United Kingdom) D Barton (United Kingdom) G Paish	6	6	6
(France) J Sanglier (France) J Thomas	4	4	4
(Netherlands) I Rinkel (Netherlands) A van Swol	6	5	6	6
(France) G Gremillet (France) H Pellizza	1	7	3	2
(France) R Abdesselam (France) R Dubuc	3	2	4
4	(France) B Destremau (France) Y Petra	6	6	6

Third round
(United States) J Patty (Ecuador) P Segura	6	5	5	8	6
(United Kingdom) D Barton (United Kingdom) G Paish	2	7	7	6	1
(Netherlands) I Rinkel (Netherlands) A van Swol	6	6	8	6
4	(France) B Destremau (France) Y Petra	2	8	6	4

Quarterfinals
(United States) J Patty (Ecuador) P Segura	6	6	5	8
(Netherlands) I Rinkel (Netherlands) A van Swol	2	4	7	6

==== Section 4 ====
First round
(United Kingdom) Murray Deloford (United Kingdom) Jimmy Jones	3	6	2	1
(Belgium) Pierre Geelhand de Merxem (Belgium) Philippe Washer	6	2	6	6
(Sweden) Lennart Bergelin (Sweden) Torsten Johansson	6	6	6
(Egypt) Adli El Shafei (Egypt) Mahmoud Talaat	4	2	3
(Republic of China (1912–1949)) Choy Wai-Chuen (Republic of China (1912–1949)) Kho Sin-Kie	6	4	4	3
(United Kingdom) Don Butler (United Kingdom) Frank Wilde	0	6	6	6
(India) Leonard Brooke Edwards (Australia) Joseph Clynton-Reed	4	6	2	0
(United Kingdom) Leslie Cater (United Kingdom) Francis Wallis	6	4	6	6
(United Kingdom) Tony Mottram (United Kingdom) Bobby Nicoll	6	3	6	6
(United Kingdom) Tony Clark (United Kingdom) Tim Lewis	1	6	3	2
(United Kingdom) Harry Marriner; C Webb	2	6	1	2
(United Kingdom) Gordon Fitt (United Kingdom) Reg Smith	6	4	6	6
(United Kingdom) John Comery (Republic of Ireland) Dick Sandys	2	1	4
(Czechoslovakia) Josef Šíba (Czechoslovakia) Vojtěch Vodička	6	6	6
(Australia) Bob Baker (United Kingdom) Tim Miles	0	1	2
2	(United States) Tom Brown (United States) Jack Kramer	6	6	6

Second round
(Belgium) P Geelhand de Merxem (Belgium) P Washer	3	7	4
(Sweden) L Bergelin (Sweden) T Johansson	6	9	6
(United Kingdom) D Butler (United Kingdom) F Wilde	6	6	6
(United Kingdom) L Cater (United Kingdom) F Wallis	3	1	2
(United Kingdom) A Mottram (United Kingdom) R Nicoll	6	6	6
(United Kingdom) G Fitt (United Kingdom) R Smith	2	0	1
(Czechoslovakia) J Šíba (Czechoslovakia) V Vodička	2	1	2
2	(United States) T Brown (United States) J Kramer	6	6	6

Third round
(Sweden) L Bergelin (Sweden) T Johansson	8	6	3	4	6
(United Kingdom) D Butler (United Kingdom) F Wilde	6	4	6	6	2
(United Kingdom) A Mottram (United Kingdom) R Nicoll	1	4	4
2	(United States) T Brown (United States) J Kramer	6	6	6

Quarterfinals
(Sweden) L Bergelin (Sweden) T Johansson	1	6	4	0
2	(United States) T Brown (United States) J Kramer	6	3	6	6

The nationality of C Webb is unknown.
