= 1951 Davis Cup Europe Zone =

International tennis competition

Details
- Duration: 3 May 1951 – 29 July 1951
- Teams: 21
- Categories: 1951 Davis Cup Europe Zone; 1951 Davis Cup America Zone

Champion
- Winning nation: Sweden; Qualified for: 1951 Davis Cup; Inter-Zonal Final

The Europe Zone was one of the two regional zones of the 1951 Davis Cup.

21 teams entered the Europe Zone, with the winner going on to compete in the Inter-Zonal Final against the winner of the America Zone. A seeding system was introduced for the first time, where the previous year's quarterfinalists were guaranteed a bye in the first round.

Sweden defeated West Germany in the final, and went on to face the United States in the Inter-Zonal Final.

== Draw ==
First Round; 3–11 May
Sweden
bye
Austria
bye
France
bye
Great Britain
bye
Philippines
bye
Finland	1
Brazil	4
Ireland
bye
Netherlands	4
Monaco	1
Norway	2
Egypt	3
bye
Belgium
Yugoslavia	2
West Germany	3
bye
Denmark
Switzerland	5
Luxembourg	0
bye
Poland
bye
South Africa
bye
Italy

Second Round; 11–22 May
Vienna, Austria (clay)
Sweden	5
Austria	0
Wimbledon, England (grass)
France	2
Great Britain	3
Paris, France (clay)
Philippines	4
Brazil	1
Scheveningen, Netherlands (clay)
Ireland	2
Netherlands	3
Brussels, Belgium
Egypt	1
Belgium	4
West Berlin (clay)
West Germany	4
Denmark	1
Zürich, Switzerland
Switzerland	1
Poland	4
Milan, Italy (clay)
South Africa	2
Italy	3

Quarterfinals; 14–19 June
Scarborough, England (grass)
Sweden	5
Great Britain	0
Noordwijk, Netherlands (clay)
Philippines	4
Netherlands	1
Cologne, West Germany
Belgium	2
West Germany	3
Milan, Italy (clay)
Poland	0
Italy	5

Semifinals; 13–19 July
Båstad, Sweden (clay)
Sweden	5
Philippines	0
Munich, West Germany
West Germany	3
Italy	2

Final; 27–29 July
Båstad, Sweden (clay)
Sweden	5
West Germany	0

== First round ==
=== Finland vs. Brazil ===
Finland
1
Helsinki, Finland
4–6 May 1951

Brazil
4

			1	2	3	4	5
1	(Finland) (Brazil)	Pentti Forsman; Alcides Procópio	4; 6	4; 6	6; 4	6; 2	1; 6
2	(Finland) (Brazil)	Sakari Salo; Armando Vieira	1; 6	1; 6	4; 6
3	(Finland) (Brazil)	Pentti Forsman / Sakari Salo; Alcides Procópio / Armando Vieira	4; 6	4; 6	1; 6
4	(Finland) (Brazil)	Sakari Salo; Roberto Cardozo	6; 3	6; 4	6; 4
5	(Finland) (Brazil)	Pentti Forsman; Armando Vieira	6; 2	4; 6	5; 7	6; 0	2; 6

=== Netherlands vs. Monaco ===
Netherlands
4
Scheveningen, Netherlands
3–5 May 1951
Clay

Monaco
1

			1	2	3	4	5
1	(Netherlands) (Monaco)	John Linck; Georges Pasquier	3; 6	6; 2	6; 4	9; 7
2	(Netherlands) (Monaco)	Hans van Swol; Aleco Noghès	2; 6	6; 4	6; 2	6; 0
3	(Netherlands) (Monaco)	Ivo Rinkel / Hans van Swol; Aleco Noghès / Georges Pasquier	6; 1	6; 2	6; 2
4	(Netherlands) (Monaco)	Hans van Swol; Georges Pasquier	6; 1	6; 1	6; 2
5	(Netherlands) (Monaco)	John Linck; Aleco Noghès	6; 3	8; 10	6; 3	5; 7	2; 6

=== Norway vs. Egypt ===
Norway
2
Oslo, Norway
9–11 May 1951
Clay

Egypt
3

			1	2	3	4	5
1	(Norway) (Egypt)	Johan Haanes; Marcel Coen	6; 2	6; 2	6; 3
2	(Norway) (Egypt)	Jan Staubo; Adli El Shafei	8; 6	3; 6	5; 7	2; 6
3	(Norway) (Egypt)	Johan Haanes / Sverre Lie; Marcel Coen / Adli El Shafei	9; 11	4; 6	3; 6
4	(Norway) (Egypt)	Johan Haanes; Adli El Shafei	1; 6	4; 6	3; 6
5	(Norway) (Egypt)	Jan Staubo; Marcel Coen	4; 6	6; 3	6; 3	6; 3

=== Yugoslavia vs. West Germany ===
Yugoslavia
2
Zagreb, Yugoslavia
4–7 May 1951

West Germany
3

			1	2	3	4	5
1	(Socialist Federal Republic of Yugoslavia) (West Germany)	Milan Branović; Ernst Buchholz	4; 6	5; 7	6; 2	6; 2	6; 4
2	(Socialist Federal Republic of Yugoslavia) (West Germany)	Dragutin Mitić; Gottfried von Cramm	0; 6	2; 6	6; 8
3	(Socialist Federal Republic of Yugoslavia) (West Germany)	Dragutin Mitić / Josip Palada; Gottfried von Cramm / Rolf Göpfert	2; 6	9; 7	4; 6	4; 6
4	(Socialist Federal Republic of Yugoslavia) (West Germany)	Dragutin Mitić; Ernst Buchholz	6; 3	12; 10	6; 4
5	(Socialist Federal Republic of Yugoslavia) (West Germany)	Milan Branović; Gottfried von Cramm	1; 6	7; 5	7; 9	4; 6

=== Switzerland vs. Luxembourg ===
Switzerland
5
Lausanne, Switzerland
3–6 May 1951

Luxembourg
0

			1	2	3	4	5
1	(Switzerland) (Luxembourg)	Max Albrecht; Gaston Wampach	6; 3	6; 8	6; 1	6; 0
2	(Switzerland) (Luxembourg)	Jost Spitzer; Géza Wertheim	6; 0	6; 4	6; 2
3	(Switzerland) (Luxembourg)	Paul Blondel / René Buser; Gaston Wampach / Géza Wertheim	3; 6	7; 9	6; 3	6; 2	6; 2
4	(Switzerland) (Luxembourg)	Max Albrecht; Géza Wertheim	6; 1	6; 2	6; 1
5	(Switzerland) (Luxembourg)	Jost Spitzer; Gaston Wampach	6; 1	12; 10	6; 2

== Second round ==
=== Austria vs. Sweden ===
Austria
0
Vienna, Austria
19–21 May 1951
Clay

Sweden
5

			1	2	3	4	5
1	(Austria) (Sweden)	Gustav Specht; Sven Davidson	1; 6	6; 8	0; 6
2	(Austria) (Sweden)	Hans Redl; Lennart Bergelin	9; 7	2; 6	1; 6	1; 6
3	(Austria) (Sweden)	Alfred Huber / Hans Redl; Lennart Bergelin / Sven Davidson	3; 6	5; 7	2; 6
4	(Austria) (Sweden)	Hans Redl; Sven Davidson	4; 6	6; 1	4; 6	1; 6
5	(Austria) (Sweden)	Gustav Specht; Torsten Johansson	1; 6	5; 7	7; 5	4; 6

=== Great Britain vs. France ===
Great Britain
3
No. 1 Court, All England Club, Wimbledon, England
19–22 May 1951
Grass

France
2

			1	2	3	4	5
1	(United Kingdom) (France)	Geoffrey Paish; Paul Rémy	3; 6	2; 6	3; 6
2	(United Kingdom) (France)	Tony Mottram; Bernard Destremau	6; 3	1; 6	6; 8	6; 2	6; 3
3	(United Kingdom) (France)	Tony Mottram / Geoffrey Paish; Robert Abdesselam / Paul Rémy	7; 5	6; 3	6; 8	6; 4
4	(United Kingdom) (France)	Tony Mottram; Paul Rémy	6; 2	6; 4	6; 4
5	(United Kingdom) (France)	Arthur G. Roberts; Bernard Destremau	5; 7	2; 6	8; 6	6; 3	3; 6

=== Philippines vs. Brazil ===
Philippines
4
Paris, France
11–13 May 1951
Clay

Brazil
1

			1	2	3	4	5
1	(Philippines) (Brazil)	Raymundo Deyro; Armando Vieira	3; 6	2; 6	7; 9
2	(Philippines) (Brazil)	Felicisimo Ampon; Alcides Procópio	6; 1	6; 0	6; 1
3	(Philippines) (Brazil)	Felicisimo Ampon / César Carmona; Alcides Procópio / Armando Vieira	3; 6	6; 2	6; 1	7; 5
4	(Philippines) (Brazil)	Felicisimo Ampon; Armando Vieira	8; 6	3; 6	6; 0	6; 0
5	(Philippines) (Brazil)	Raymundo Deyro; Roberto Cardozo	6; 3	7; 5	6; 3

=== Netherlands vs. Ireland ===
Netherlands
3
Scheveningen, Netherlands
11–13 May 1951
Clay

Ireland
2

			1	2	3	4	5
1	(Netherlands) (Republic of Ireland)	Ludwig Krijt; Joseph Hackett	6; 3	4; 6	6; 4	6; 2
2	(Netherlands) (Republic of Ireland)	Hans van Swol; Guy Jackson	7; 5	6; 4	4; 6	3; 6	4; 6
3	(Netherlands) (Republic of Ireland)	Ivo Rinkel / Hans van Swol; Joseph Hackett / Cyril Kemp	6; 3	6; 1	6; 2
4	(Netherlands) (Republic of Ireland)	Hans van Swol; Joseph Hackett	6; 2	6; 4	6; 1
5	(Netherlands) (Republic of Ireland)	Ludwig Krijt; Guy Jackson	2; 6	3; 6	9; 7	5; 7

=== Belgium vs. Egypt ===
Belgium
4
Brussels, Belgium
19–21 May 1951

Egypt
1

			1	2	3	4	5
1	(Belgium) (Egypt)	Jacques Brichant; Marcel Coen	6; 1	6; 1	6; 0
2	(Belgium) (Egypt)	Philippe Washer; Adli El Shafei	4; 6	6; 2	7; 5	6; 4
3	(Belgium) (Egypt)	Jacques Brichant / Philippe Washer; Marcel Coen / Adli El Shafei	6; 2	7; 5	2; 6	6; 2
4	(Belgium) (Egypt)	Jacques Peten; Marcel Coen	4; 6	6; 1	5; 7	4; 6
5	(Belgium) (Egypt)	Jacques Brichant; Adli El Shafei	6; 3	6; 1	6; 4

=== West Germany vs. Denmark ===
West Germany
4
West Berlin
18–20 May 1951
Clay

Denmark
1

			1	2	3	4	5
1	(West Germany) (Denmark)	Gottfried von Cramm; Kurt Nielsen	6; 2	6; 4	6; 0
2	(West Germany) (Denmark)	Ernst Buchholz; Torben Ulrich	6; 2	3; 6	4; 6	4; 6
3	(West Germany) (Denmark)	Gottfried von Cramm / Rolf Göpfert; Kurt Nielsen / Torben Ulrich	6; 4	6; 4	6; 2
4	(West Germany) (Denmark)	Ernst Buchholz; Kurt Nielsen	2; 6	3; 6	6; 3	6; 3	6; 4
5	(West Germany) (Denmark)	Gottfried von Cramm; Torben Ulrich	6; 4	6; 2	6; 4

=== Switzerland vs. Poland ===
Switzerland
1
Zürich, Switzerland
18–20 May 1951

Poland
4

			1	2	3	4	5
1	(Switzerland) (Poland)	Max Albrecht; Józef Piątek	7; 5	6; 4	5; 7	0; 6	1; 6
2	(Switzerland) (Poland)	Jost Spitzer; Władysław Skonecki	6; 4	2; 6	2; 6	5; 7
3	(Switzerland) (Poland)	René Buser / Jost Spitzer; Józef Piątek / Władysław Skonecki	3; 6	7; 5	6; 1	3; 6	6; 4
4	(Switzerland) (Poland)	Jost Spitzer; Józef Piątek	6; 8	4; 6	4; 6
5	(Switzerland) (Poland)	Max Albrecht; Władysław Skonecki	6; 3	6; 1	5; 7	3; 6	3; 6

=== Italy vs. South Africa ===
Italy
3
Milan, Italy
18–21 May 1951
Clay

South Africa
2

			1	2	3	4	5
1	(Italy) (South Africa)	Giovanni Cucelli; Sydney Levy	9; 11	6; 0	6; 4	7; 5
2	(Italy) (South Africa)	Rolando del Bello; Eric Sturgess	3; 6	1; 6	5; 7
3	(Italy) (South Africa)	Marcello del Bello / Giovanni Cucelli; Leon Norgarb / Eric Sturgess	13; 11	6; 4	6; 4
4	(Italy) (South Africa)	Rolando del Bello; Sydney Levy	6; 4	6; 3	6; 2
5	(Italy) (South Africa)	Giovanni Cucelli; Eric Sturgess	3; 6	2; 6	6; 4	7; 9

== Quarterfinals ==
=== Great Britain vs. Sweden ===
Great Britain
0
Yorkshire Lawn Tennis Club, Scarborough, England
14–16 June 1951
Grass

Sweden
5

			1	2	3	4	5
1	(United Kingdom) (Sweden)	Geoffrey Paish; Lennart Bergelin	7; 9	1; 6	3; 6
2	(United Kingdom) (Sweden)	Tony Mottram; Sven Davidson	6; 4	5; 7	2; 6	6; 8
3	(United Kingdom) (Sweden)	Tony Mottram / Geoffrey Paish; Lennart Bergelin / Sven Davidson	6; 2	3; 6	7; 9	8; 10
4	(United Kingdom) (Sweden)	Tony Mottram; Lennart Bergelin	6; 3	7; 5	3; 6	4; 6	2; 6
5	(United Kingdom) (Sweden)	Geoffrey Paish; Sven Davidson	6; 2	5; 7	1; 6	4; 6

=== Netherlands vs. Philippines ===
Netherlands
1
Noordwijk, Netherlands
15–17 June 1951
Clay

Philippines
4

			1	2	3	4	5
1	(Netherlands) (Philippines)	Ludwig Krijt; Raymundo Deyro	4; 6	0; 6	1; 6
2	(Netherlands) (Philippines)	John Linck; Felicisimo Ampon	1; 6	3; 6	7; 5	1; 6
3	(Netherlands) (Philippines)	Ivo Rinkel / Hans van Swol; Felicisimo Ampon / César Carmona	5; 7	6; 3	7; 5	6; 4
4	(Netherlands) (Philippines)	John Linck; Raymundo Deyro	1; 6	4; 6	6; 4	2; 6
5	(Netherlands) (Philippines)	Ludwig Krijt; César Carmona	3; 6	3; 6	1; 6

=== West Germany vs. Belgium ===
West Germany
3
Cologne, West Germany
15–17 June 1951

Belgium
2

			1	2	3	4	5
1	(West Germany) (Belgium)	Gottfried von Cramm; Philippe Washer	5; 7	6; 3	6; 4	6; 4
2	(West Germany) (Belgium)	Ernst Buchholz; Jacques Brichant	1; 6	3; 6	2; 6
3	(West Germany) (Belgium)	Gottfried von Cramm / Rolf Göpfert; Jacques Brichant / Philippe Washer	8; 6	3; 6	6; 2	6; 3
4	(West Germany) (Belgium)	Gottfried von Cramm; Jacques Brichant	6; 0	6; 2	3; 6	6; 3
5	(West Germany) (Belgium)	Ernst Buchholz; Philippe Washer	6; 3	3; 6	6; 8	3; 6

=== Italy vs. Poland ===
Italy
5
Milan, Italy
17–19 June 1951
Clay

Poland
0

			1	2	3	4	5
1	(Italy) (Poland)	Giovanni Cucelli; Józef Piątek	8; 6	6; 0	6; 2
2	(Italy) (Poland)	Rolando del Bello; Jan Radzio	7; 9	6; 3	7; 5	6; 1
3	(Italy) (Poland)	Marcello del Bello / Giovanni Cucelli; Jan Chytrowski / Józef Piątek	6; 2	6; 3	6; 2
4	(Italy) (Poland)	Rolando del Bello; Józef Piątek	6; 4	6; 0	1; 6	6; 2
5	(Italy) (Poland)	Giuseppe Merlo; Jan Radzio	6; 1	6; 1	6; 2

== Semifinals ==
=== Sweden vs. Philippines ===
Sweden
5
Båstad Tennis Stadium, Båstad, Sweden
17–19 July 1951
Clay

Philippines
0

			1	2	3	4	5
1	(Sweden) (Philippines)	Lennart Bergelin; Raymundo Deyro	6; 1	6; 3	6; 2
2	(Sweden) (Philippines)	Sven Davidson; Felicisimo Ampon	6; 1	6; 4	4; 6	0; 6	6; 3
3	(Sweden) (Philippines)	Lennart Bergelin / Sven Davidson; Felicisimo Ampon / César Carmona	6; 3	8; 6	6; 4
4	(Sweden) (Philippines)	Lennart Bergelin; Felicisimo Ampon	6; 3	6; 1	0; 6	1; 6	6; 2
5	(Sweden) (Philippines)	Sven Davidson; Raymundo Deyro	6; 4	4; 6	3; 6	8; 6	7; 5

=== West Germany vs. Italy ===
West Germany
3
Munich, West Germany
13–17 July 1951

Italy
2

			1	2	3	4	5
1	(West Germany) (Italy)	Ernst Buchholz; Rolando del Bello	2; 6	6; 1	8; 6	1; 6	4; 6
2	(West Germany) (Italy)	Gottfried von Cramm; Giovanni Cucelli	6; 2	4; 6	8; 6	7; 5
3	(West Germany) (Italy)	Gottfried von Cramm / Rolf Göpfert; Marcello del Bello / Giovanni Cucelli	6; 4	6; 2	4; 6	9; 7
4	(West Germany) (Italy)	Ernst Buchholz; Giovanni Cucelli	2; 6	3; 6	4; 6
5	(West Germany) (Italy)	Gottfried von Cramm; Rolando del Bello	7; 5	6; 4	4; 6	6; 4

== Final ==
=== Sweden vs. West Germany ===
Sweden
5
Båstad Tennis Stadium, Båstad, Sweden
27–29 July 1951
Clay

West Germany
0

			1	2	3	4	5
1	(Sweden) (West Germany)	Lennart Bergelin; Gottfried von Cramm	6; 4	6; 1	6; 4
2	(Sweden) (West Germany)	Sven Davidson; Ernst Buchholz	6; 2	6; 1	6; 4
3	(Sweden) (West Germany)	Lennart Bergelin / Sven Davidson; Gottfried von Cramm / Rolf Göpfert	9; 7	9; 7	8; 10	6; 2
4	(Sweden) (West Germany)	Lennart Bergelin; Ernst Buchholz	6; 1	5; 7	6; 4	6; 3
5	(Sweden) (West Germany)	Sven Davidson; Helmut Gulcz	6; 0	6; 2	6; 1
