= 1946 Wimbledon Championships – Men's singles =

Men's singles
- 1946 Wimbledon Championships

Final
- Champion: (France) Yvon Petra
- Runner-up: (Australia) Geoff Brown
- Score: 6–2, 6–4, 7–9, 5–7, 6–4

Details
- Draw: 128
- Seeds: 8

Events
Singles	men	women		boys	girls
Doubles	men	women	mixed	boys	girls
- Wimbledon Championships

Yvon Petra defeated Geoff Brown in the final, 6–2, 6–4, 7–9, 5–7, 6–4 to win the gentlemen's singles tennis title at the 1946 Wimbledon Championships. Bobby Riggs was the reigning champion, but was ineligible to compete after turning professional.

== Seeds ==
1. (Australia) Dinny Pails (quarterfinals)
2. (United States) Jack Kramer (fourth round)
3. (Australia) Geoff Brown (final)
4. (Ecuador) Pancho Segura (third round)
5. (France) Yvon Petra (champion)
6. (Socialist Federal Republic of Yugoslavia) Dragutin Mitić (fourth round)
7. (Socialist Federal Republic of Yugoslavia) Franjo Punčec (quarterfinals)
8. (Sweden) Lennart Bergelin (quarterfinals)

Click on the seed number of a player to go to their draw section.

== Draw ==
Key

- Q = Qualifier
- WC = Wild card
- LL = Lucky loser
- Alt = Alternate
- ITF = ITF entry
- PR = Protected ranking
- SR = Special ranking
- SE = Special exempt
- JE = Junior exempt
- JR = Junior Accelerator Programme entrant
- CO = College Accelerator Programme entrant
- NG = Next Gen Accelerator Program entrant
- w/o = Walkover
- r = Retired
- d = Defaulted

=== Finals ===
Quarterfinals
1	(Australia) Dinny Pails	5	5	8	4
5	(France) Yvon Petra	7	7	6	6
(United States) Tom Brown	6	8	6
7	(Socialist Federal Republic of Yugoslavia) Franjo Punčec	2	6	4
8	(Sweden) Lennart Bergelin	11	9	4
3	(Australia) Geoff Brown	13	11	6
(France) Pierre Pellizza	4	4	4
(Czechoslovakia) Jaroslav Drobný	6	6	6

Semifinals
5	(France) Yvon Petra	4	4	6	7	8
(United States) Tom Brown	6	6	3	5	6
3	(Australia) Geoff Brown	6	7	6
(Czechoslovakia) Jaroslav Drobný	4	5	2

Final
5	(France) Yvon Petra	6	6	7	5	6
3	(Australia) Geoff Brown	2	4	9	7	4

=== Top half ===
==== Section 1 ====
First round
1	(Australia) Dinny Pails	6	6	6
(Chile) Andrés Hammersley	2	2	0
(Netherlands) Hubert Wilton	6	6	7
(United Kingdom) Henry Billington	4	4	5
(United Kingdom) Don Butler	6	6	6
(British Ceylon) Doug Scharenguivel	2	1	2
(United States) Frank Mehner	6	6	7
(United Kingdom) Roland Morton	3	1	5
(United Kingdom) Jack Moore	6	6	6
(United Kingdom) Tommy Anderson	2	4	3
(Belgium) Pierre Geelhand de Merxem	6	6	6
(New Zealand) Buster Andrews	4	3	4
(France) Henri Bolelli	6	6	6
(Norway) Finn Rune Karlsen	3	3	1
(United States) Budge Patty	4	6	6	6
(France) Jacques Thomas	6	3	2	2

Second round
1	(Australia) D Pails	6	6	6
(Netherlands) H Wilton	0	4	1
(United Kingdom) D Butler	6	4	6	4	6
(United States) F Mehner	4	6	4	6	4
(United Kingdom) J Moore	1	2	6
(Belgium) P Geelhand de Merxem	6	6	8
(France) H Bolelli	3	6	7
(United States) J Patty	6	8	9

Third round
1	(Australia) D Pails	6	6	6
(United Kingdom) D Butler	1	4	2
(Belgium) P Geelhand de Merxem	8	1	3	4
(United States) J Patty	6	6	6	6

Fourth round
1	(Australia) D Pails	6	6	7
(United States) J Patty	2	1	5

==== Section 2 ====
First round
5	(France) Yvon Petra	6	8	7
(Czechoslovakia) Vojtěch Vodička	2	6	5
(Socialist Federal Republic of Yugoslavia) Josip Palada	6	6	6
(Republic of Ireland) Raymond Egan	0	3	4
(Egypt) Adli El Shafei	3	5	6	6	6
(United Kingdom) George Godsell	6	7	3	4	3
(Australia) Bob Baker	6	9	6	5	6
(Australia) Joseph Clynton-Reed	8	7	2	7	4
(Sweden) Torsten Johansson
(Republic of China (1912–1949)) Ken Lo	w/o
(United Kingdom) Peter Hare	1	6	8	2
(United Kingdom) Gordon Fitt	6	3	10	6
(Switzerland) René Buser	6	6	3	4	6
(United Kingdom) Bobby Meredith	3	4	6	6	2
(France) Georges Gremillet	7	2	7	6
(United Kingdom) Geoffrey Paish	5	6	5	0

Second round
5	(France) Y Petra	9	6	6
(Socialist Federal Republic of Yugoslavia) J Palada	7	4	0
(Egypt) A El Shafei	6	6	6
(Australia) R Baker	3	2	2
(Sweden) T Johansson	6	6	3	6
(United Kingdom) G Fitt	3	4	6	3
(Switzerland) R Buser	6	6	6
(France) G Gremillet	3	3	4

Third round
5	(France) Y Petra	6	6	6
(Egypt) A El Shafei	2	2	2
(Sweden) T Johansson	6	8	8	5	4
(Switzerland) R Buser	3	6	10	7	6

Fourth round
5	(France) Y Petra	6	4	6	6
(Switzerland) R Buser	4	6	0	1

==== Section 3 ====
First round
4	(Ecuador) Pancho Segura	6	6	6
(United Kingdom) Tony Clark	1	1	1
(United Kingdom) John Comery	1	7	6	6	7
(United States) Sanford Webster	6	9	3	1	5
(United States) Tom Brown	6	10	6
(United Kingdom) Murray Deloford	4	8	2
(United Kingdom) Roland Carter	6	6	11
(United Kingdom) Claude Lister	4	4	9
(Czechoslovakia) Josef Šíba	2	4	6	6	6
(Switzerland) Hans Huonder	6	6	1	4	3
(United Kingdom) Tony Mottram	6	6	6
(Socialist Federal Republic of Yugoslavia) Stefán László	2	1	1
(Belgium) Jack Van den Eynde	6	6	4	4	6
(France) Robert Abdesselam	4	1	6	6	1
(United Kingdom) Frank Wilde	3	6	0	6	6
(United Kingdom) Dennis Slack	6	2	6	3	3

Second round
4	(Ecuador) F Segura	6	6	6
(United Kingdom) J Comery	1	1	1
(United States) T Brown	6	6	6
(United Kingdom) R Carter	1	4	1
(Czechoslovakia) J Šíba	6	1	8	4
(United Kingdom) A Mottram	3	6	10	6
(Belgium) J Van den Eynde	6	7	7	6
(United Kingdom) F Wilde	2	5	9	3

Third round
4	(Ecuador) F Segura	6	3	3	3
(United States) T Brown	4	6	6	6
(United Kingdom) A Mottram	6	6	6
(Belgium) J Van den Eynde	3	1	2

Fourth round
(United States) T Brown	6	6	6
(United Kingdom) A Mottram	1	1	3

==== Section 4 ====
First round
7	(Socialist Federal Republic of Yugoslavia) Franjo Punčec	6	6	6
(United Kingdom) Gwyn Tuckett	2	2	3
(Denmark) Jaanik Ipsen	7	6	6
(Republic of Ireland) George McVeagh	5	4	3
(Peru) Enrique Buse	2	7	6	4	6
(United Kingdom) Francis Wallis	6	5	4	6	2
(Czechoslovakia) Ferdinand Vrba	6	2	6	6
(United Kingdom) Guy Cooper	3	6	0	3
(Republic of China (1912–1949)) Kho Sin-Kie	6	6	6
(France) Paul Féret	4	1	4
(Australia) Alan Coldham	6	6	6
(United Kingdom) Derek Bocquet	1	1	2
(Australia) Jack Harper	6	6	6
(Belgium) Léopold de Borman	2	2	2
(Netherlands) Hans van Swol	6	6	6
(United Kingdom) Bob Tinkler	1	3	4

Second round
7	(Socialist Federal Republic of Yugoslavia) F Punčec	6	6	6
(Denmark) J Ipsen	1	3	0
(Peru) E Buse	6	3	4	3
(Czechoslovakia) F Vrba	4	6	6	6
(Republic of China (1912–1949)) S-K Kho	6	4	6	7
(Australia) A Coldham	1	6	4	5
(Australia) J Harper	6	6	4	6	0
(Netherlands) A van Swol	4	8	6	4	6

Third round
7	(Socialist Federal Republic of Yugoslavia) F Punčec	6	6	5	6
(Czechoslovakia) F Vrba	3	0	7	3
(Republic of China (1912–1949)) S-K Kho	6	4	2	5
(Netherlands) A van Swol	1	6	6	7

Fourth round
7	(Socialist Federal Republic of Yugoslavia) F Punčec	6	6	6
(Netherlands) A van Swol	1	2	2

=== Bottom half ===
==== Section 5 ====
First round
(United Kingdom) Derrick Leyland	6	6	6
(United States) JE Slater	3	4	3
(France) Jacques Sanglier	6	6	6
(Norway) Johan Haanes	2	4	4
(United States) Bill Robertson	6	5	6	6
(Netherlands) Boebi van Meegeren	4	7	2	2
(Republic of Ireland) Cyril Kemp	6	6	0	11	6
(Republic of China (1912–1949)) Choy Wai-Chuen	4	4	6	13	2
(United Kingdom) Derrick Barton	6	6	6
(France) Christian Grandet	2	4	3
(United Kingdom) Arnold England	6	6	7
(United Kingdom) John Drinkall	4	1	5
(United Kingdom) Maurice Lucking	6	6	3	6	8
(New Zealand) Dennis Coombe	8	4	6	2	6
(Belgium) Philippe Washer	4	6	1	6	5
8	(Sweden) Lennart Bergelin	6	3	6	2	7

Second round
(United Kingdom) D Leyland	1	1	10
(France) J Sanglier	6	6	12
(United States) W Robertson	4	8	6	4	6
(Republic of Ireland) C Kemp	6	6	4	6	0
(United Kingdom) D Barton	6	8	6
(United Kingdom) A England	3	6	2
(United Kingdom) M Lucking	0	0	0
8	(Sweden) L Bergelin	6	6	6

Third round
(France) J Sanglier	7	6	4	1	7
(United States) W Robertson	5	2	6	6	5
(United Kingdom) D Barton	8	3	4
8	(Sweden) L Bergelin	10	6	6

Fourth round
(France) J Sanglier	2	4	1
8	(Sweden) L Bergelin	6	6	6

==== Section 6 ====
First round
(France) Bernard Destremau	7	8	4	6
(Czechoslovakia) Josef Caska	5	6	6	0
(United Kingdom) Jack Darkins	4	6	6	7
(Egypt) Mahmoud Talaat	6	3	2	5
(Argentina) Enrique Morea	6	6	8
(United Kingdom) Harold Marsland	3	3	6
(Switzerland) Jost Spitzer	6	6	6
(United Kingdom) Bobby Nicoll	2	1	3
(United States) Stanley Drobac	5	2	7	6	7
(United Kingdom) Fergus Davidson	7	6	5	4	5
(Poland) Ernest Wittmann	6	6	6
(United States) Frank Beeman	1	2	2
(United Kingdom) Harry Marriner	4	6	6	6
(Australia) DA Clayton	6	0	2	0
(United Kingdom) Brian Burnett	0	3	0
3	(Australia) Geoff Brown	6	6	6

Second round
(France) B Destremau	6	6	6
(United Kingdom) J Darkins	1	0	3
(Argentina) E Morea	6	6	6
(Switzerland) J Spitzer	2	1	2
(United States) S Drobac	2	1	3
(Poland) E Wittmann	6	6	6
(United Kingdom) H Marriner	0	0	1
3	(Australia) G Brown	6	6	6

Third round
(France) B Destremau	6	0	2	8
(Argentina) E Morea	2	6	6	10
(Poland) E Wittmann	0	0	2
3	(Australia) G Brown	6	6	6

Fourth round
(Argentina) E Morea	2	1	3
3	(Australia) G Brown	6	6	6

==== Section 7 ====
First round
(United Kingdom) Herman David	8	9	6
(United Kingdom) Derek Hardwick	6	7	2
(Netherlands) Ivo Rinkel	7	6	6
(United Kingdom) Tim Lewis	5	4	4
(France) Pierre Pellizza	6	6	6
(United Kingdom) Reg Smith	2	1	0
(Australia) Harry Hopman	6	6	6
(Egypt) Andre Najar	4	0	2
(France) Roger Dubuc
(Poland) Maksymiljan Stolarow	w/o
(United Kingdom) Cecil Betts	6	6	6
(New Zealand) John Cope	3	1	2
(United Kingdom) Donald MacPhail	6	6	6
(France) Henri Pellizza	2	3	2
(United States) John Wilkinson	1	2	0
6	(Socialist Federal Republic of Yugoslavia) Dragutin Mitić	6	6	6

Second round
(United Kingdom) H David	4	11	3	6	3
(Netherlands) I Rinkel	6	9	6	4	6
(France) P Pellizza	4	4	6	6	6
(Australia) H Hopman	6	6	3	4	1
(France) R Dubuc	6	7	6
(United Kingdom) C Betts	2	5	0
(United Kingdom) D MacPhail	6	3	0	2
6	(Socialist Federal Republic of Yugoslavia) D Mitić	2	6	6	6

Third round
(Netherlands) I Rinkel	2	2	2
(France) P Pellizza	6	6	6
(France) R Dubuc	2	4	3
6	(Socialist Federal Republic of Yugoslavia) D Mitić	6	6	6

Fourth round
(France) P Pellizza	7	3	7	6	6
6	(Socialist Federal Republic of Yugoslavia) D Mitić	9	6	5	4	2

==== Section 8 ====
First round
(Poland) Czesław Spychała	6	6	9
(United Kingdom) Jimmy Jones	1	4	7
(Czechoslovakia) Jaroslav Drobný	6	6	6
(United Kingdom) Eric Filby	4	2	3
(United Kingdom) Headley Baxter	6	6	6
(Monaco) Gaston Médécin	1	0	3
(Belgium) Jacques Peten	6	8	7
(Switzerland) Hans Pfaff	3	6	5
(Poland) Ignacy Tłoczyński	6	4	6	6
(France) Jean Lesueur	2	6	3	4
(United Kingdom) Cliff Hovell	6	6	6
(United Kingdom) Howard Walton	3	4	4
(United Kingdom) Ted Avory	6	6	6
(Denmark) Helge Johansen	3	2	1
(Republic of Ireland) Dick Sandys	0	2	0
2	(United States) Jack Kramer	6	6	6

Second round
(Poland) C Spychała	4	4	2
(Czechoslovakia) J Drobný	6	6	6
(United Kingdom) H Baxter	5	6	2
(Belgium) J Peten	7	8	6
(Poland) I Tłoczyński	6	6	6
(United Kingdom) C Hovell	3	2	1
(United Kingdom) E Avory	1	1	0
2	(United States) J Kramer	6	6	6

Third round
(Czechoslovakia) J Drobný	6	6	6
(Belgium) J Peten	2	2	3
(Poland) I Tłoczyński	1	0	0
2	(United States) J Kramer	6	6	6

Fourth round
(Czechoslovakia) J Drobný	2	17	6	3	6
2	(United States) J Kramer	6	15	3	6	3

Preceded by 1946 Australian Championships	Grand Slams; Men's Singles	Succeeded by 1946 French Championships
