= 1950 French Championships – Men's singles =

Men's singles
- 1950 French Championships

Final
- Champion: (United States) Budge Patty
- Runner-up: (Egypt) Jaroslav Drobný
- Score: 6–1, 6–2, 3–6, 5–7, 7–5

Details
- Seeds: 8

Events
Singles	men	women
Doubles	men	women
← 1949 ·	French Championships	· 1951 →

Budge Patty defeated Jaroslav Drobný 6–1, 6–2, 3–6, 5–7, 7–5 in the final to win the men's singles tennis title at the 1950 French Championships.

== Seeds ==
The seeded players are listed below. Budge Patty is the champion; others show the round in which they were eliminated.

1. (Egypt) Jaroslav Drobný (finalist)
2. (Australia) Frank Sedgman (fourth round)
3. (United States) William Talbert (semifinals)
4. (South Africa) Eric Sturgess (semifinals)
5. (United States) Arthur D. Larsen (quarterfinals)
6. (Australia) John Bromwich (quarterfinals)
7. (United States) Budge Patty (champion)
8. (United States) Vic Seixas (quarterfinals)

== Draw ==
=== Key ===
- Q = Qualifier
- WC = Wild card
- LL = Lucky loser
- r = Retired

=== Finals ===
Quarterfinals
1	(Egypt) Jaroslav Drobný	7	17	5	6
8	(United States) Vic Seixas	5	15	7	4
4	(South Africa) Eric Sturgess	4	6	6	6
5	(United States) Art Larsen	6	3	2	4
6	(Australia) John Bromwich	2	2	3
3	(United States) William Talbert	6	6	6
7	(United States) Budge Patty	0	6	3	6	11
(United States) Irvin Dorfman	6	1	6	1	9

Semifinals
1	(Egypt) Jaroslav Drobný	6	7	3	12
4	(South Africa) Eric Sturgess	4	5	6	10
3	(United States) William Talbert	6	4	6	4	11
7	(United States) Budge Patty	2	6	4	6	13

Final
1	(Egypt) Jaroslav Drobný	1	2	6	7	5
7	(United States) Budge Patty	6	6	3	5	7

=== Earlier rounds ===
==== Section 1 ====
First round

Second round
1	(Egypt) Drobný	6	6	6
(France) Dessair	3	2	0
(France) Favieres	5	6	7	4	6
(United Kingdom) Paish	7	0	5	6	1
(Italy) Zampori	2	5	0
(Sweden) Bergelin	6	7	6
(Belgium) Geelhand De Merxem	2	3	2	r
(United States) Trabert	6	6	3

Third round
1	(Egypt) Drobný	6	6	6
(France) Favieres	1	1	1
(Sweden) Bergelin	7	1	5	4
(United States) Trabert	5	6	7	6

Fourth round
1	(Egypt) Drobný	6	6	9
(United States) Trabert	3	3	7

==== Section 2 ====
First round
8	(United States) Seixas	6	6	6
(Egypt) Coen	2	2	4
(Israel) Avidan-Weiss	0	2	6	3
(France) Dubuc	6	6	4	6
(France) Ducos De La Haille
(Switzerland) Blondel
(Australia) Hopman	1	6	6	6
(France) Colin	6	1	1	3
(Socialist Federal Republic of Yugoslavia) Bojovic
(Australia) McGregor
(Spain) Bartroli
(Monaco) Noghès
(Socialist Federal Republic of Yugoslavia) Branović	5	6	8	4	6
(Republic of Ireland) Murphy	7	3	6	6	0
(Italy) Del Bello	2	9	6	6
(Spain) Olozaga	6	7	2	2

Second round
8	(United States) Seixas	6	6	6
(France) Dubuc	2	3	2
(France) Ducos De La Haille	6	5	4	4
(Australia) Hopman	3	7	6	6
(Australia) McGregor	6	6	4	6
(Monaco) Noghès	3	3	6	2
(Socialist Federal Republic of Yugoslavia) Branović	7	6	6	5	4
(Italy) Del Bello	5	3	8	7	6

Third round
8	(United States) Seixas	6	6	6
(Australia) Hopman	3	1	1
(Australia) McGregor	6	6	6
(Italy) Del Bello	1	1	3

Fourth round
8	(United States) Seixas	6	6	12	6
(Australia) McGregor	4	8	10	3

==== Section 3 ====
First round
4	(South Africa) Sturgess	6	6	6
(Portugal) Roquette	1	2	0
(France) Iemetti	6	6	6
(United States) Bender	0	2	2
(United Kingdom) Mexborough	0	4	0
(Monaco) Pasquier	6	6	6
(France) Bolelli
(India) Bose
(Italy) Della Vida	5	1	2
(Australia) Rose	7	6	6
(Belgium) Peten	6	4	7	6
(France) Dubuisson	3	6	5	3
(Italy) Caccia	6	6	6
(France) Hode	1	4	4
(United States) Kovaleski
(Switzerland) Grange

Second round
4	(South Africa) Sturgess	6	6	6
(France) Iemetti	4	1	0
(Monaco) Pasquier	0	3	3
(France) Bolelli	6	6	6
(Australia) Rose	6	6	6
(Belgium) Peten	4	1	1
(Italy) Caccia	7	3	4
(United States) Kovaleski	9	6	6

Third round
4	(South Africa) Sturgess	6	6	6
(France) Bolelli	0	1	0
(Australia) Rose	4	8	4	2
(United States) Kovaleski	6	6	6	6

Fourth round
4	(South Africa) Sturgess	6	4	6	6
(United States) Kovaleski	1	6	4	3

==== Section 4 ====
First round
5	(United States) Larsen	6	6	6
(Republic of Ireland) Hackett	2	3	4
(Egypt) Zalzal	2	3	4
(Philippines) Carmona	6	6	6
(France) Chevallier	3	6	6	3	2
(France) Schaff	6	4	4	6	6
(France) Bayon	6	1	0	4
(Argentina) Morea	1	6	6	6
(France) Jamain	6	2	3	6	6
(Netherlands) Van Meegeren	3	6	6	1	2
(France) Destremau
(France) Rodel	w/o
(Philippines) Deyro	6	6	6
(France) Malosse	1	1	1
(Egypt) Najar	2	3	1
(Australia) Quist	6	6	6

Second round
5	(United States) Larsen	6	6	6
(Philippines) Carmona	4	4	3
(France) Schaff
(Argentina) Morea
(France) Jamain	6	5	6	r
(France) Destremau	8	7	3
(Philippines) Deyro	5	3	3
(Australia) Quist	7	6	6

Third round
5	(United States) Larsen	6	7	6
(France) Schaff	3	5	3
(France) Destremau	6	11	6	6
(Australia) Quist	7	9	4	4

Fourth round
5	(United States) Larsen	6	3	7	6
(France) Destremau	3	6	5	4

==== Section 5 ====
First round
(India) Misra
(France) Journu
(France) Abdesselam	6	6	6
(France) Doublet	0	1	4
(France) Bardey	1	4	1
(Czechoslovakia) Matouš	6	6	6
(Sweden) Davidson
(India) Kumar
(France) Becker	2	6	4	2
(France) Haillet	6	3	6	6
(France) Nys	0	0	2
(Italy) Del Bello	6	6	6
(Egypt) El Shafei	7	6	6
(Israel) Buntman	5	4	3
(France) Weiss	1	0	1
6	(Australia) Bromwich	6	6	6

Second round
(France) Journu	5	7	0	2
(France) Abdesselam	7	5	6	6
(Czechoslovakia) Matouš	3	4	2
(Sweden) Davidson	6	6	6
(France) Haillet	4	2	5
(Italy) Del Bello	6	6	7
(Egypt) El Shafei	3	2	1
6	(Australia) Bromwich	6	6	6

Third round
(France) Abdesselam	13	3	3	4
(Sweden) Davidson	11	6	6	6
(Italy) Del Bello	3	3	3
6	(Australia) Bromwich	6	6	6

Fourth round
(Sweden) Davidson	3	2	1
6	(Australia) Bromwich	6	6	6

==== Section 6 ====
First round
(France) Molinari	2	3	0
(Australia) Worthington	6	6	6
(France) Lemyze	5	5	1
(France) De Kermadec	7	7	6
(France) Sanglier	1	3	2
(Philippines) Ampon	6	6	6
(United Kingdom) Horn	6	6	6
(France) Lemasson	3	4	2
(Czechoslovakia) Hyks	6	6	6
(France) Grandguillot	1	1	3
(France) Pellizza	6	7	6
(France) Chatrier	0	5	1
(India) Nath	2	6	1	3
(Socialist Federal Republic of Yugoslavia) Pallada	6	3	6	6
(France) Gentien	1	1	2
3	(United States) Talbert	6	6	6

Second round
(Australia) Worthington	7	4	6	7
(France) De Kermadec	5	6	2	5
(Philippines) Ampon	6	6	6
(United Kingdom) Horn	1	2	1
(Czechoslovakia) Hyks	4	6	2
(France) Pellizza	6	8	6
(Socialist Federal Republic of Yugoslavia) Pallada	1	4	6	0
3	(United States) Talbert	6	6	1	6

Third round
(Australia) Worthington	3	3	2
(Philippines) Ampon	6	6	6
(France) Pellizza	1	5	1
3	(United States) Talbert	6	7	6

Fourth round
(Philippines) Ampon	6	5	1	3
3	(United States) Talbert	3	7	6	6

==== Section 7 ====
First round
(France) Boussus	4	2	7	5
(United Kingdom) Walton	6	6	5	7
(France) Thomas
(France) Billaudot	w/o
(Italy) Cucelli	6	6	6
(France) Laval	1	1	2
(New Zealand) Coombe	6	6	1	6
(France) Gajan	4	2	6	2
(Socialist Federal Republic of Yugoslavia) Mitić	6	6	6
(France) du Lac de Fugères	0	1	1
(United States) Henry	1	3	4
(France) Berthet	6	6	6
(Monaco) Landau
(Spain) Carles
(United Kingdom) Barrett	2	0	1
7	(United States) Patty	6	6	6

Second round
(United Kingdom) Walton	6	0	4
(France) Thomas	8	6	6
(Italy) Cucelli	2	6	6	6
(New Zealand) Coombe	6	2	1	3
(Socialist Federal Republic of Yugoslavia) Mitić	6	6	6
(France) Berthet	3	2	2
(Monaco) Landau	5	5	1
7	(United States) Patty	7	7	6

Third round
(France) Thomas	3	6	8	2
(Italy) Cucelli	6	1	10	6
(Socialist Federal Republic of Yugoslavia) Mitić	9	4	2
7	(United States) Patty	11	6	6

Fourth round
(Italy) Cucelli	1	4	3
7	(United States) Patty	6	6	6

==== Section 8 ====
First round
(Belgium) Washer
(France) Brisson

Second round
(Belgium) Washer	6	3	9	4	3
(United States) Dorfman	2	6	7	6	6
(France) Delhomme	6	6	8	3	6
(France) Rémy	2	2	10	6	1
(Czechoslovakia) Černík	4	3	1
(United Kingdom) Mottram	6	6	6
(France) Chabance	2	2	3
2	(Australia) Sedgman	6	6	6

Third round
(United States) Dorfman	6	6	6
(France) Delhomme	1	1	3
(United Kingdom) Mottram	4	4	6	4
2	(Australia) Sedgman	6	6	1	6

Fourth round
(United States) Dorfman	2	6	3	6	7
2	(Australia) Sedgman	6	1	6	4	5

Preceded by 1950 Australian Championships – Men's singles	Grand Slam men's singles	Succeeded by 1950 Wimbledon Championships – Men's singles
