= Darkins =

Darkins is a surname. Notable people with the surname include:

- Chris Darkins (born 1974), American football player
- Jack Darkins, British tennis player

== See also ==
- David (name), where this surname originated
