= 1950 Wimbledon Championships – Boys' singles =

Boys' singles
- 1950 Wimbledon Championships

Final
- Champion: (United Kingdom) John Horn
- Runner-up: (Egypt) Kamel Moubarek
- Score: 6–0, 6–2

Events
Singles	men	women		boys	girls
Doubles	men	women	mixed	boys	girls
- Wimbledon Championships

John Horn defeated Kamel Moubarek in the final, 6–0, 6–2 to win the boys' singles tennis title at the 1950 Wimbledon Championships.

== Draw ==
Key

- Q = Qualifier
- WC = Wild card
- LL = Lucky loser
- Alt = Alternate
- ITF = ITF entry
- PR = Protected ranking
- SR = Special ranking
- SE = Special exempt
- JE = Junior exempt
- JR = Junior Accelerator Programme entrant
- CO = College Accelerator Programme entrant
- NG = Next Gen Accelerator Program entrant
- w/o = Walkover
- r = Retired
- d = Defaulted

=== Finals ===
Semifinals
(Egypt) Kamel Moubarek	6	5	6
(South Africa) Neville Katzen	4	7	3
(Socialist Federal Republic of Yugoslavia) Sima Nikolić	1	3
(United Kingdom) John Horn	6	6

Final
(Egypt) Kamel Moubarek	0	2
(United Kingdom) John Horn	6	6

=== Top half ===
First round
(France) Gérard Pilet	6	6	1
(Sweden) Percy Rosberg	8	1	6

Second round
(Socialist Federal Republic of Yugoslavia) Ilija Panajotović	6	8
(Austria) K Diglas	2	6
(Egypt) Kamel Moubarek	6	6
(Norway) Pål Kraby	4	3
(South Africa) Neville Katzen	4	6	7
(Belgium) Gino Mezzi	6	3	5
(Netherlands) Hendrik Goris	2	3
(Sweden) P Rosberg	6	6

Quarterfinals
(Socialist Federal Republic of Yugoslavia) I Panajotović	3	6	3
(Egypt) K Moubarek	6	3	6
(South Africa) N Katzen	6	6
(Sweden) P Rosberg	3	3

Semifinals
(Egypt) K Moubarek	6	5	6
(South Africa) N Katzen	4	7	3

=== Bottom half ===
First round
(Switzerland) Martin Froesch	6	6
(Brazil) A Haegler	3	4

Second round
(Switzerland) M Froesch	5	5
(Socialist Federal Republic of Yugoslavia) Sima Nikolić	7	7
(Denmark) H Bache	6	2
(Egypt) Ismail Adel	8	6
(Austria) Adolf Illenberger	1	3
(United Kingdom) John Horn	6	6
(Republic of Ireland) Gerry Fitzpatrick	6	6
(Pakistan) Rafiq Ahmad	3	2

Quarterfinals
(Socialist Federal Republic of Yugoslavia) S Nikolić	7	2	7
(Egypt) I Adel	5	6	5
(United Kingdom) J Horn	6	6
(Republic of Ireland) G Fitzpatrick	2	2

Semifinals
(Socialist Federal Republic of Yugoslavia) S Nikolić	1	3
(United Kingdom) J Horn	6	6
