= Argentine International Grass Court Championships =

Campeonato Argentino Internacional de Césped

Defunct tennis tournament
- Tour: ILTF World Circuit
- Founded: 1893; 132 years ago
- Abolished: 1978; 47 years ago
- Location: Buenos Aires, Argentina
- Venue: Hurlingham Club Argentina
- Surface: Grass / outdoor

The Argentine International Grass Court Championships was a combined open international grass court tennis tournament founded in 1925. It was first played at the Hurlingham Club Argentina, Buenos Aires, Argentina. It ran annually till 1957 then was discontinued. The first men's singles champion was Carlos Morea, and the final men's singles champion was Enrique Morea.
