= Ursula Fleming =

English psychotherapist and author

Ursula Fleming TOSD
- Born: Liverpool, England
- Died: London, England
- Education: Crichton Royal hospital, Dumfries
- Occupation: Psychotherapist
- Spouse: Jack Darkins
- Children: John, Suella, Adam and Rory
- Website: The Eckhart Society

Ursula Fleming (1930 in Liverpool – 1992 in London) was an English psychotherapist, Lay Dominican and author; she was considered an expert in her field of work.

Fleming was educated at Crichton Royal Hospital in Dumfries in south west Scotland. She began developing pain control techniques, as she wanted to be a concert pianist and wanted to control her nerves. Her attempts to find a cure for her unsteady hands led her to find a technique, which she used to treat thousands of patients, and led to her follow a career in alternative medicine. Her technique, known as the Fleming Method, relies on relaxed concentration to overcome pain. Ursula dreamed of opening a training center where she could pass on her knowledge to others but was unable to fulfill her goal due to dying of leukemia. She was married to English tennis player Jack Darkins.

In 1987, Ursula Fleming was one of the co-founders of The Eckhart Society, a group that aims to promote the views of medieval theologian Meister Eckhart. The society website states:

The impact of Ursula's work has been enormous. There is now a veritable industry of publications about Eckhart, both books and articles in scholarly journals. Eckhart is becoming ever more widely known. Dag Hammarskjöld, the former Secretary General of the United Nations always had Eckhart's works by his bedside. The Meister Eckhart Gesellschaft was established in Germany in 2004. Each year there are many doctoral theses published on Eckhart in different languages, and the constant demand for back issues of The Eckhart Review are proof if more were needed of Ursula's success in helping to rehabilitate the Meister. Ursula's book Grasping the Nettle (1990) has been translated into Russian and is now being translated into Czech.

Fleming wrote five books and featured in another, the most notable were two on pain control called Grasping the nettle: A positive approach to pain and Fleming Method of Relaxation for Concentration, Stress Management and Pain Control. They are designed to help health care professionals teach pain control techniques to patients.
