= 1950 Wimbledon Championships – Girls' singles =

Girls' singles
- 1950 Wimbledon Championships

Final
- Champion: (United Kingdom) Lorna Cornell
- Runner-up: (Norway) Astrid Winther
- Score: 6–2, 6–4

Details
- Draw: 10

Events
Singles	men	women		boys	girls
Doubles	men	women	mixed	boys	girls
← 1949 ·	Wimbledon Championships	· 1951 →

Lorna Cornell defeated Astrid Winther in the final, 6–2, 6–4 to win the girls' singles tennis title at the 1950 Wimbledon Championships.

== Draw ==
=== Key ===
- Q = Qualifier
- WC = Wild card
- LL = Lucky loser
- Alt = Alternate
- SE = Special exempt
- PR = Protected ranking
- ITF = ITF entry
- JE = Junior exempt
- w/o = Walkover
- r = Retired
- d = Defaulted
- SR = Special ranking

=== Draw ===
First round
(Norway) Astrid Winther	6	6
(Switzerland) V Gafner	3	1
(France) Annie Passet	6	6
(Denmark) A Gammeltoft	2	4

Quarterfinals
(Sweden) M Molin	4	1
(Belgium) C de Jonghe	6	6
(Netherlands) J Mullemeister	11	7	2
(Norway) Astrid Winther	13	5	6
(France) Annie Passet	6	6	5
(United Kingdom) Lorna Cornell	8	0	7
(Republic of Ireland) Heather Cole	6	6
(Finland) M Mattsson	0	1

Semifinals
(Belgium) C de Jonghe	1	4
(Norway) Astrid Winther	6	6
(United Kingdom) Lorna Cornell	7	4	6
(Republic of Ireland) Heather Cole	5	6	2

Final
(Norway) Astrid Winther	2	4
(United Kingdom) Lorna Cornell	6	6
