= Jack Darkins =

British tennis player

Jack Darkins was a British tennis player, who played in the 1946 Wimbledon Championships in singles.

Darkins defeated Egypt's Mahmoud Talaat in the first round at the 1946 Wimbledon championship, but was eliminated in the second round by Bernard Destremau.

Darkins was married to Ursula Fleming, an acclaimed British psychotherapist.

== See also ==
- 1946 Wimbledon Championships – Men's singles
