= Milan Matouš =

Czech-Italian ice hockey player

- Country (sports): Czechoslovakia; Italy
- Born: 4 March 1923
- Died: February 2003 (aged 79)

Singles

Grand Slam singles results
- French Open: 2R (1949, 1950, 1951)
- Wimbledon: 3R (1951)

Doubles

Grand Slam doubles results
- Wimbledon: QF (1950)

Milan Matouš (4 March 1923 – February 2003) was a Czech-Italian ice hockey and tennis player.

Matouš, born in Prague, played for I. ČLTK Praha in the Czechoslovak First Ice Hockey League during the 1940s and represented the Czechoslovakia national ice hockey team.

In 1948 he defected with his future wife, tennis player Helena Štraubeová.

Settling in Italy, Matouš played ice hockey for HC Milan, while also competing on the tennis tour. He won the 1949 Portuguese International Championships and was a doubles quarter-finalist at the 1950 Wimbledon Championships. His ice hockey career also included a season in Switzerland with HC Ambrì-Piotta and international appearances for Italy.
