= Sverre Lie (tennis) =

Norwegian tennis player

- Country (sports): Norway
- Born: 14 February 1926
- Died: 7 September 1983 (aged 57)

Singles

Grand Slam singles results
- Wimbledon: 3R (1950)
- US Open: 2R (1948)

Sverre Lie (14 February 1926 – 7 September 1983) was a Norwegian tennis player.
