= Geoff Brown (tennis) =

Australian tennis player (1924–2001)

- Full name: Geoffrey Edmund Brown
- Country (sports): Australia
- Born: 4 April 1924; Murrurundi, New South Wales, Australia
- Died: 20 June 2001 (aged 77); Euroa, Victoria, Australia
- Turned pro: 1945 (amateur tour)
- Retired: 1958
- Plays: Ambidextrous

Singles
- Highest ranking: No. 10 (1946, Pierre Gillou)

Grand Slam singles results
- Australian Open: SF (1946, 1948, 1949)
- Wimbledon: F (1946)
- US Open: 4R (1947)

Doubles

Grand Slam doubles results
- Australian Open: F (1949)
- Wimbledon: F (1946, 1950)

Grand Slam mixed doubles results
- Wimbledon: F (1946, 1950)

Geoffrey Edmund Brown (4 April 1924 – 20 June 2001) was an Australian tennis player.

Brown was born in Murrurundi, New South Wales, Australia. He attended Parramatta Marist High School from 1938 to 1939 before joining the R.A.A.F as a gunner. He was demobilised at the end of the war and returned to playing tennis.

Brown was runner-up in the 1946 Wimbledon Championships singles final, losing in five sets to Yvon Petra, and doubles final playing with Dinny Pails. He also reached the doubles finals at the 1949 Australian Championships and 1950 Wimbledon Championships, in both he was partnered by compatriot Bill Sidwell and in both finals they lost to John Bromwich and Adrian Quist. He reached the quarterfinal at the 1949 Wimbledon Championships by defeating US champion Pancho Gonzales in the fourth round.

With his countryman Dinny Pails he won the doubles title at the Irish Tennis Championships in July 1946. He won the singles title at the Kent Lawn Tennis Championships in 1948 and 1950. In April 1949 he reached the final of the South African Championships in Johannesburg but lost in four sets to Eric Sturgess. In April 1950 Brown won the Surrey Tennis Tournament against Paddy Robert in the final. In May he played in the British Hard Court Championships in Bournemouth and reached the final in which he lost to Jaroslav Drobný. In June he defeated Sumant Misra in the singles final of the Northern Lawn Tennis Championships. Due to an illness and operation Brown did not play tennis for more than a year and returned in October 1951. In October 1952 he won the Sydney Metropolitan Grasscourt Championships, defeating Lew Hoad in the final in three sets.

In 1947 and 1948 Brown played for the Australian Davis Cup team and compiled a record of three wins and one loss.

Brown was married firstly to Veronica Lineham. Their first child, Virginia Ann Brown, was born in 1951. He went on to have three more children; Vonnie, Geoffrey Vincent, and Danielle. Brown later remarried. He died in Euroa, Victoria on 20 June 2001, at the age of 77.

== Grand Slam finals ==
=== Singles (1 runner-up) ===
Result	Year	Championship	Surface	Opponent	Score
Loss	1946	Wimbledon Championships	Grass	(France) Yvon Petra	2–6, 4–6, 9–7, 7–5, 4–6

=== Doubles (3 runners-up) ===
Result	Year	Championship	Surface	Partner	Opponents	Score
Loss	1946	Wimbledon	Grass	(Australia) Dinny Pails	(United States) Tom Brown (United States) Jack Kramer	4–6, 4–6, 2–6
Loss	1949	Australian Championships	Grass	(Australia) Bill Sidwell	(Australia) John Bromwich (Australia) Adrian Quist	6–1, 5–7, 2–6, 3–6
Loss	1950	Wimbledon	Grass	(Australia) Bill Sidwell	(Australia) John Bromwich (Australia) Adrian Quist	5–7, 6–3, 3–6, 6–3, 2–6

=== Mixed doubles (2 runners-up) ===
Result	Year	Championship	Surface	Partner	Opponents	Score
Loss	1946	Wimbledon	Grass	(United States) Dorothy Cheney	(United States) Louise Brough (United States) Tom Brown	4–6, 4–6
Loss	1950	Wimbledon	Grass	(United States) Patricia Canning Todd	(United States) Louise Brough (South Africa) Eric Sturgess	9–11, 6–1, 4–6
