= Cesar Carmona =

Filipino tennis player

- Country (sports): Philippines
- Plays: Right-handed

Singles

Grand Slam singles results
- French Open: 2R (1950, 1951)
- Wimbledon: 3R (1950)
- US Open: 2R (1946)

Cesar Carmona was a Filipino tennis player.

Carmona played for the Philippines Davis Cup team between 1946 and 1951, mostly as the doubles partner of Felicisimo Ampon. The team made the semi-finals of the 1951 Davis Cup Europe Zone.

While on a tour of the United States in 1946 he secured a major upset win over reigning collegiate champion Bob Falkenburg at the Western Hardcourt tournament, dropping just four games in the process.

Carmona made the singles third round of the 1950 Wimbledon Championships.
