= John Linck =

Dutch tennis player

Johan Pieter August "John" Linck (29 September 1925, in Surakarta – 16 December 2000, in Bangkok) was a Dutch tennis player. He reached the third round of section 4 in the 1950 Wimbledon Championships, where he lost to the American tennis player Vic Seixas. Linck was also selected for the Davis Cup team of Netherlands with Hans van Swol, Rob van Meegeren, and Ivo Rinkel.
