= 1950 Wimbledon Championships =

- Date: 26 June – 8 July
- Edition: 64th
- Category: Grand Slam
- Surface: Grass
- Location: Church Road; SW19, Wimbledon, London, United Kingdom
- Venue: All England Lawn Tennis and Croquet Club

Champions

Men's singles
- (United States) Budge Patty

Women's singles
- (United States) Louise Brough

Men's doubles
- (Australia) John Bromwich / (Australia) Adrian Quist

Women's doubles
- (United States) Louise Brough / (United States) Margaret duPont

Mixed doubles
- (South Africa) Eric Sturgess / (United States) Louise Brough

Boys' singles
- (United Kingdom) John Horn

Girls' singles
- (United Kingdom) Lorna Cornell
| ← 1949 · | Wimbledon Championships | · 1951 → |

The 1950 Wimbledon Championships took place on the outdoor grass courts at the All England Lawn Tennis and Croquet Club in Wimbledon, London, United Kingdom. The tournament was held from Monday 26 June until Saturday 8 July. It was the 64th staging of the Wimbledon Championships, and the third Grand Slam tennis event of 1950.

For the first time since the 1927 introduction of seedings 16 players were seeded in the men's singles event instead of eight. Budge Patty and Louise Brough won the singles titles.

== Finales ==
=== Seniors ===
==== Men's singles ====
(United States) Budge Patty defeated (Australia) Frank Sedgman, 6–1, 8–10, 6–2, 6–3

==== Women's singles ====
(United States) Louise Brough defeated (United States) Margaret duPont, 6–1, 3–6, 6–1

==== Men's doubles ====
(Australia) John Bromwich / (Australia) Adrian Quist defeated (Australia) Geoff Brown / (Australia) Bill Sidwell, 7–5, 3–6, 6–3, 3–6, 6–2

==== Women's doubles ====
(United States) Louise Brough / (United States) Margaret duPont defeated (United States) Shirley Fry / (United States) Doris Hart, 6–4, 5–7, 6–1

==== Mixed doubles ====
(South Africa) Eric Sturgess / (United States) Louise Brough defeated (Australia) Geoff Brown / (United States) Pat Todd, 11–9, 1–6, 6–4

=== Juniors ===
==== Boys' singles ====
(United Kingdom) John Horn defeated (Egypt) Kamel Moubarek, 6–0, 6–2

==== Girls' singles ====
(United Kingdom) Lorna Cornell defeated (Norway) Astrid Winther, 6–2, 6–4

| Preceded by 1950 French Championships | Grand Slams | Succeeded by 1950 U.S. National Championships |
