= Narendra Nath (tennis) =

Indian tennis player

- Country (sports): India
- Born: 5 May 1922
- Died: 25 August 1999 (aged 77)
- Plays: Right-handed

Singles

Grand Slam singles results
- French Open: 2R (1948)
- Wimbledon: 3R (1948, 1950)

Doubles

Grand Slam doubles results
- Wimbledon: QF (1953)

Narendra Nath (5 May 1922 — 25 August 1999) was an Indian tennis player.

Nath, an All-India hard court champion from Lahore, competed on tour in the 1940s and 1950s.

In 1950 he won the Surrey Championships, beating reigning champion Czesław Spychała in the final.

Nath made the singles third round at Wimbledon twice and was a men's doubles quarter-finalist with countryman Naresh Kumar in 1953. He was subsequently picked to partner Naresh Kumar in doubles for the 1954 Davis Cup.

== See also ==
- List of India Davis Cup team representatives
