= Hubert Wilton =

Dutch tennis player

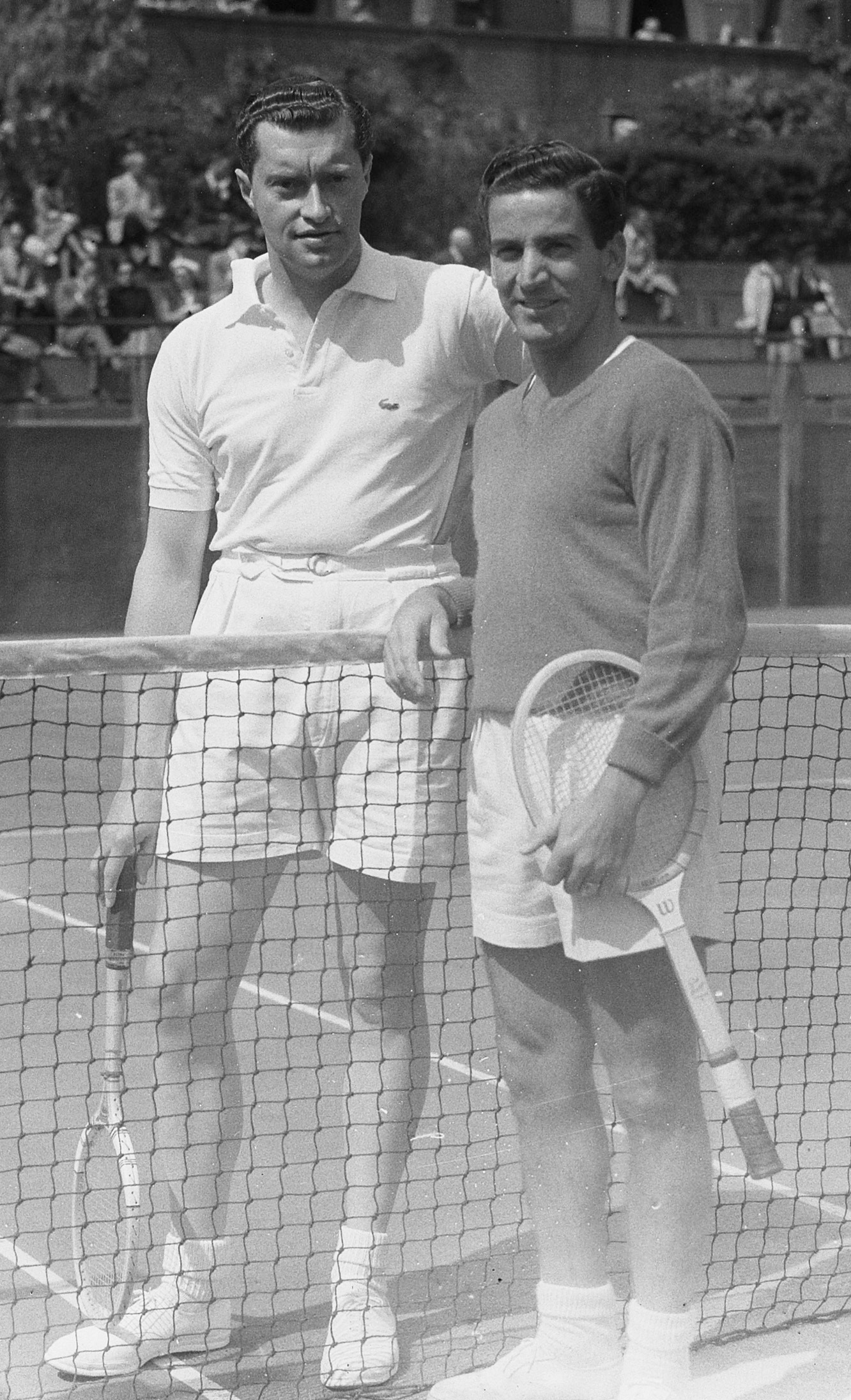
Hubert Wilton and Armando Vieira

Hubertus "Huib" Wilton (12 March 1921 in Rotterdam – 29 October 1959) was a Dutch tennis player. He was on the 1953 Netherlands Davis Cup team which also included among others Hans van Swol (his partner in the men's doubles), Boebi van Meegeren and Ivo Rinkel. In 1950 Wilton reached the second round at Wimbledon, losing to Henry Billington of Great Britain 6–1, 7–5, 11–9.

Wilton came from a wealthy family. His grandfather, Bartel Wilton (1828–1898), had founded a shipyard, which after a merger with the Fijenoord shipyard became Wilton-Fijenoord. After his tennis career he became the owner of a chain of movie theaters ("City-concern") which his father, Bartel Winton (1863–1938), had founded. In 1959 he financed the movie Moutarde van Sonansee by his friend Toon Hermans. Soon after the premiere of this movie, he died in a car accident on the freeway between The Hague and Amsterdam.
