= Czesław Spychała =

Polish tennis player

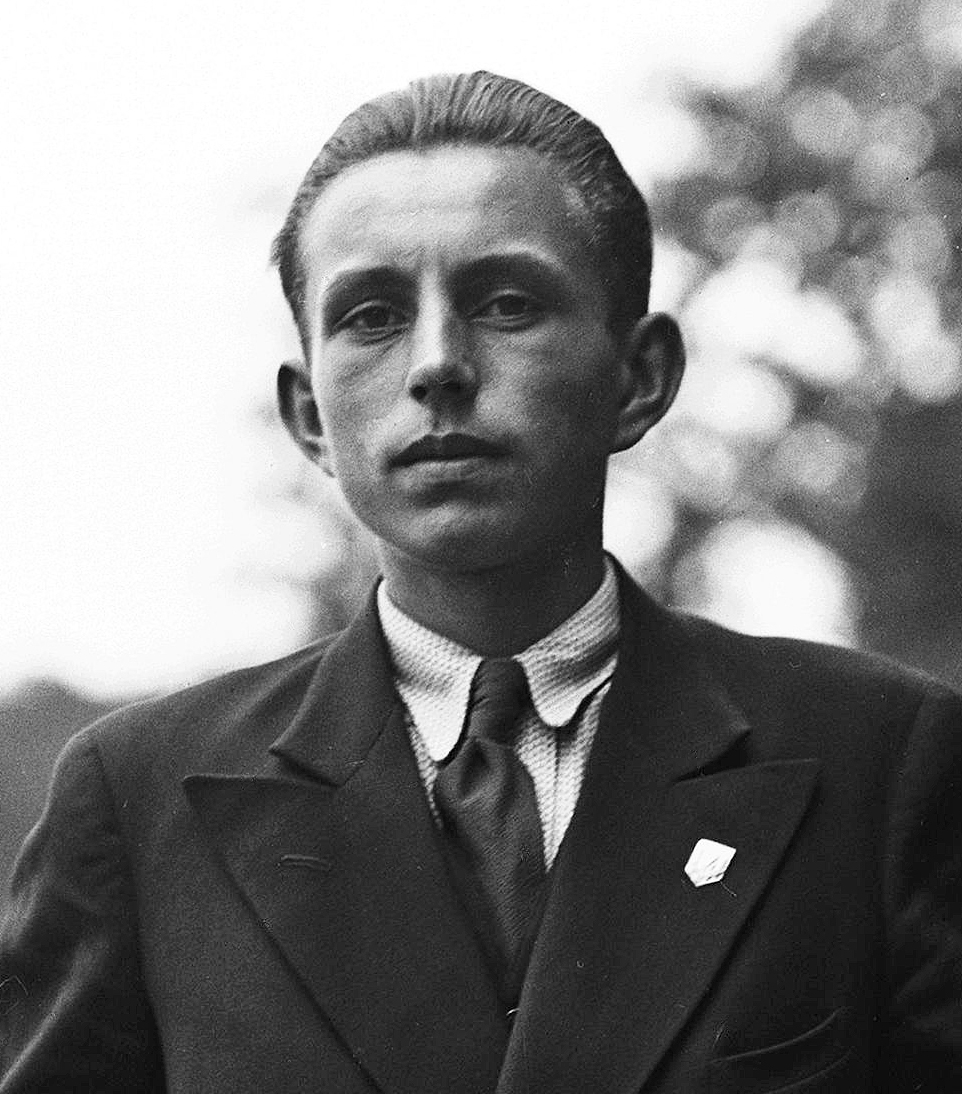
- Country (sports): Poland
- Born: 1 January 1917 Poznań, German Empire
- Died: 25 December 1994 (aged 77)
- Plays: Right-handed

Grand Slam singles results
- French Open: 3R (1938)
- Wimbledon: 2R (1946, 1947, 1951, 1952, 1954)

Grand Slam doubles results
- Wimbledon: 3R (1946)

Grand Slam mixed doubles results
- Wimbledon: 3R (1957)

Czesław Spychała (Polish pronunciation: [ˈt͡ʂɛswaf spɨˈxawa]; 1 January 1917 – 25 December 1994) was a Polish tennis player active in the decade before and after World War II.

== Biography ==
Spychała was born in Posen, German Empire (modern Poznań, Poland).

He represented Poland in the Davis Cup on a single occasion. In 1938 Poland played against Italy in the second round of the European zone. He played the doubles match with his teammate Ignacy Tłoczyński against Ferruccio Quintavalle and Valentino Taroni and lost in five sets. Italy won the tie, played on clay courts in Milan, by 3–2. Spychała was scheduled to play the doubles match against The Netherlands in the first round of the 1939 Davis Cup competition but was replaced by Tłoczyński when he did not how up on time.

His first participation in a Grand Slam event was the 1938 French Championships. He made it to the third round of the singles event in which he was defeated in straight sets by Robert Abdesselam. That year he was ranked No.3 in Poland.

In 1939 at the start of World War II Spychała was taken prisoner by the Soviet Army after they invaded Poland but escaped captivity and went underground. He took the identity of "Marian Tworowski" and as a member of the "Ruczaj" battalion of the Polish resistance was involved in raids on the German forces. In 1944 during the Warsaw Uprising he was shot through the hand and retaken prisoner which he remained until the end of the war.

In 1946 he was the runner-up at the All England Plate, a tennis competition held at the Wimbledon Championships which consisted of players who were defeated in the first or second rounds of the singles competition. He lost the final in straight sets to Robert Abdesselam. Until 1954 he played a further eight times in the singles event at Wimbledon but did not make it past the second round. He reached the third round in both the doubles (1946) and mixed doubles events (1957).

Spychała won the Welsh Championships singles title in July 1946 as well as the doubles title with compatriot Ignacy Tłoczyński. The same year he also won singles titles at tournaments in Bognor and the Middlesex Championships at Chiswick. In April 1947 he won the singles title at the Tally-Ho! Hard Courts tournament on clay in Birmingham and in July successfully defended his Welsh singles and doubles title. In August 1948 he won the singles titles at Cranleigh Open at Merton Park, West Surrey and New Malden and in September he defeated Tłoczyński in the final of the South of England Championships in Eastbourne and together they won the doubles title. The titles at the Cranleigh and New Malden tournaments were successfully defended the following year.

In 1949 he won the singles event at the Surrey Grass Court Championships in Surbiton, defeating Geoffrey Paish in the final. The following year, 1950, he lost this title to Narendra Nath but in 1951 regained it after a win in the final against David Samaai. In 1950 Spychała and Tłoczyński were to play the doubles final of the Midland Counties Championships in Birmingham against Jaroslav Drobný and Bill Sidwell but rain prevented play and the prize was shared with their opponents.

Spychała was decorated by the Polish government in exile with the Gold Cross of Merit in 1966. In 1971 he received the Lawn Tennis Writers award for his services to the game.

He was married to Gladys Pilkington.
