= Enrique Morea =

Argentine tennis player

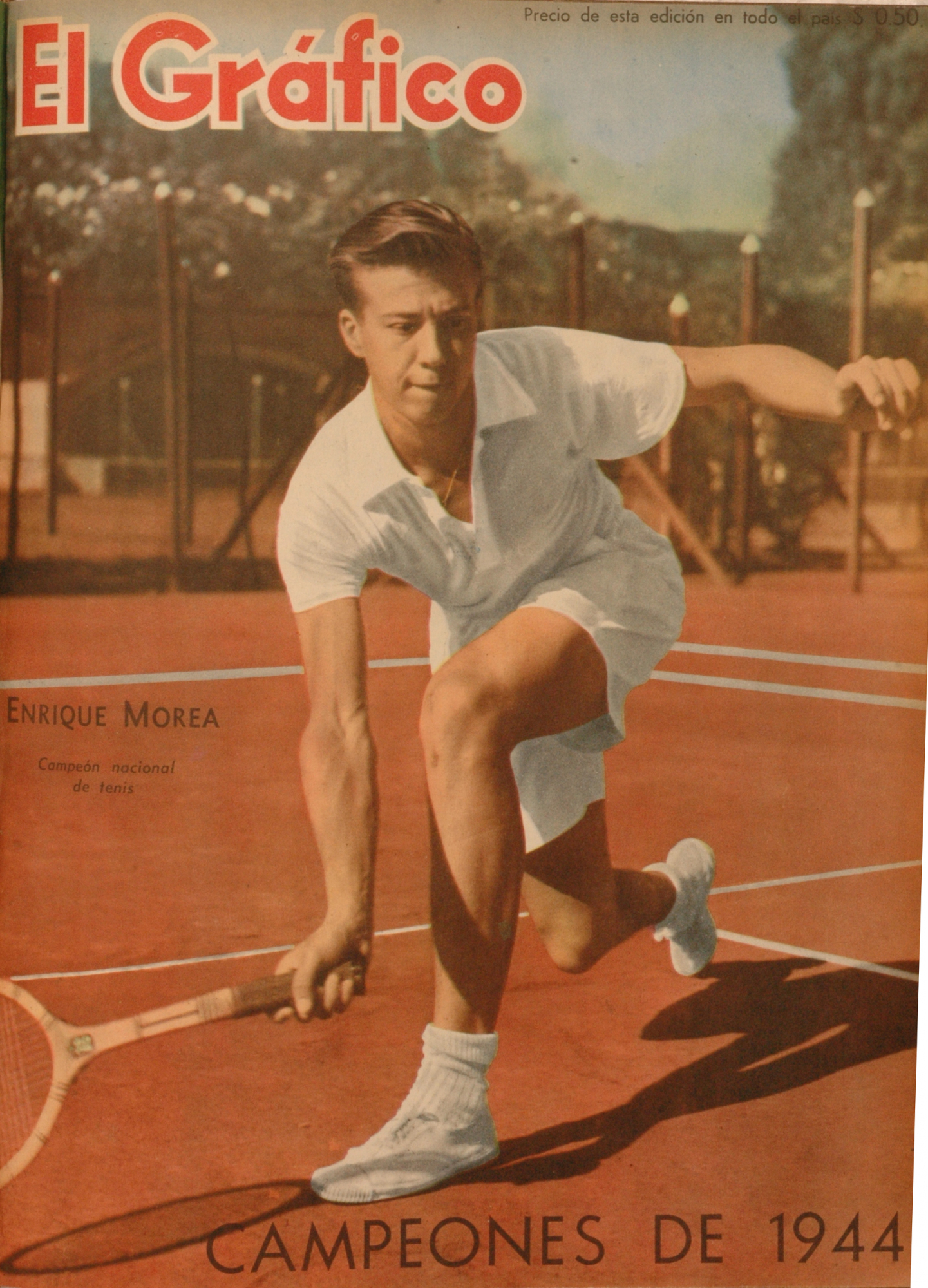
- Full name: Enrique Jorge Morea
- Country (sports): Argentina
- Born: 11 April 1924 Buenos Aires, Argentina
- Died: 15 March 2017 (aged 92)
- Turned pro: 1944 (amateur tour)
- Retired: 1968
- Plays: Right-handed

Singles
- Career record: 285–122 (70%)
- Career titles: 22
- Highest ranking: No. 10 (1953, Lance Tingay)

Grand Slam singles results
- French Open: SF (1953, 1954)
- Wimbledon: 4R (1946, 1947)
- US Open: 4R (1955)

Doubles

Grand Slam doubles results
- French Open: F (1946)

Grand Slam mixed doubles results
- French Open: W (1950)
- Wimbledon: F (1952, 1953, 1955)
Medal record
Pan American Games
Gold medal – first place	1951 Buenos Aires	Men's Singles
Gold medal – first place	1951 Buenos Aires	Men's Doubles
Silver medal – second place	1951 Buenos Aires	Mixed Doubles
Silver medal – second place	1955 Mexico City	Men's Singles
Silver medal – second place	1955 Mexico City	Mixed Doubles

Enrique Morea

President of the Asociación Argentina de Tenis
- Incumbent
- Assumed office 1996
- Preceded by: Carlos Bello

Enrique Jorge Morea (11 April 1924 – 15 March 2017) was an Argentine tennis player.

Morea reached the singles semifinals of the French Championships in 1953, beating Mervyn Rose and Gardnar Mulloy and then losing to Ken Rosewall. At the French in 1954, he beat Jozsef Asboth and Mulloy, then lost to Art Larsen in the semifinals.

Morea won the mixed-doubles title of the 1950 French Championships. He also won two gold medals at the inaugural men's tennis competition at the 1951 Pan American Games. Lance Tingay of The Daily Telegraph ranked Morea as world No. 10 in 1953 and 1954. As of 2014, Morea was the honorary president of the Asociación Argentina de Tenis (AAT). He also won the singles title at the Argentine International Grass Court Championships played at the Hurlingham Club Argentina three times in 1952, 1953 and 1957.

== Grand Slam finals ==
=== Mixed doubles: 4 (1 title, 3 runners-up) ===
Result	Year	Championship	Surface	Partner	Opponents	Score
Win	1950	French Championships	Clay	(United States) Barbara Scofield	(United States) Patricia Canning Todd (United States) Bill Talbert	w/o
Loss	1952	Wimbledon	Grass	(Australia) Thelma Coyne Long	(United States) Doris Hart (Australia) Frank Sedgman	6–4, 6–3, 6–4
Loss	1953	Wimbledon	Grass	(United States) Shirley Fry	(United States) Doris Hart (United States) Vic Seixas	7–9, 5–7
Loss	1955	Wimbledon	Grass	(United States) Louise Brough	(United States) Doris Hart (United States) Vic Seixas	8–6, 2–6, 6–3
