= Torsten Johansson (tennis) =

Swedish tennis player (1920–2004)

- Country (sports): Sweden
- Born: 11 April 1920 Karlsborg, Sweden
- Died: 14 May 2004 (aged 84) Malmö, Sweden
- Turned pro: 1946 (amateur tour)
- Plays: Right-handed

Singles
- Career record: 57–28

Grand Slam singles results
- French Open: 4R (1949)
- Wimbledon: 4R (1947, 1951, 1953)
- US Open: 4R (1947, 1950)

Doubles
- Career record: 18–8

Grand Slam doubles results
- Wimbledon: QF (1946)

Grand Slam mixed doubles results
- Wimbledon: QF (1949)

Torsten Johansson (11 April 1920 – 14 May 2004) was a Swedish tennis player who was active during the 1940s, 50s and 60s.

== Tennis career ==
Johansson set a record by shutting out two opponents at the 1947 Wimbledon, when he beat Brian Royds and Pierre Geeland De Merxem, 6–0, 6–0, 6–0 in the first and second rounds respectively.

Johansson played for the Royal Tennis Club of Stockholm in the early 1940s and won more than 100 national titles for the club, a record that still stands. Johansson also won 32 Swedish National titles, being 7 titles in singles (4 indoor and 3 outdoor), 10 in doubles (3 indoor and 7 outdoor) as well as 15 mixed doubles titles (5 indoor and 10 outdoor).

During the period 1946 to 1960 he played 72 Davis Cup matches for Sweden of which 51 were victorious. His last match was the 1960 Europe Zone semifinal victory against France. He and Lennart Bergelin, coach of Björn Borg, turned Sweden into a tennis power after World War II.

Johansson won 14 international tournaments in his career, including the Swedish Open in 1947, the Copenhagen Indoor International in 1949 and 1950, the Dusseldorf International (beating Jaroslav Drobny in the semifinals) and the German International Covered Court Championship 1956. In 1956, he was also a finalist to Ian Vermaak at the South African Championships.

After retiring, Johansson became a world-wide distributor of Tretorn Shoes from Sweden and established an outlet in the United States with Bancroft Sporting Goods. He was a World Class Player in Senior Tournaments until his death in 2004. In 2005, he was posthumously inducted into the Swedish Tennis Hall of Fame.

== See also ==
- List of Sweden Davis Cup team representatives
