= Jacques Sanglier =

- Full name: Jacques Andre Emile Sanglier
- Country (sports): France
- Born: 22 February 1919; Bois-Colombes, Seine
- Died: 3 March 2014 (aged 95); Neuilly-sur-Seine, Hauts-de-Seine

Singles

Grand Slam singles results
- French Open: 3R (1936, 1946, 1948)
- Wimbledon: 4R (1946)

Jacques Andre Emile Sanglier (22 February 1919 – 3 March 2014) was a French politician and tennis player.

A native of Paris, Sanglier was active on the tennis tour from the 1930s to 1950s. He made the singles fourth round at the 1946 Wimbledon Championships, before being beaten by Lennart Bergelin.

Sanglier was a member of Gaullist political parties and was first elected deputy in 1959.

He represented Paris's 22nd constituency in the National Assembly from 1962–1967 and from 1969–1973.

He replaced Pierre-Christian Taittinger as a Senator of Paris in 1976 and served the final two years of his term.
