= Rolando Del Bello =

Italian tennis player (1925–2002)

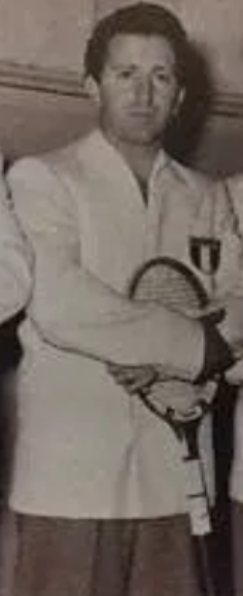
- Country (sports): Italy
- Born: 26 October 1925; Rome, Italy
- Died: 1 January 2002 (aged 76); Nerviano, Italy
- Plays: Right-handed

Singles

Grand Slam singles results
- French Open: 4R (1952)
- Wimbledon: 4R (1949)

Rolando Del Bello (26 October 1925 — 1 January 2002) was an Italian tennis player.

Born in Rome, Del Bello and his elder brother Marcello were trained by their father Oberdan, who ran a tennis club in the city. His career was hampered by a childhood injury he received when a construction wagon ran over and severed his right ankle. This permanently affected his gait and movement.

Del Bello became Italian junior champion in 1942 and after the war steadily improved his national rankings before earning a Davis Cup call up in 1950, the year he defeated his brother in the national championship final.

A Davis Cup player from 1950 to 1953, Del Bello registered 14 singles wins and in 1952 featured in the Inter-Zonal final against the U.S. in Sydney, where he was beaten in four sets by Ham Richardson as the Americans swept the tie.

== See also ==
- List of Italy Davis Cup team representatives
