= Ivo Rinkel =

Dutch tennis and field hockey player

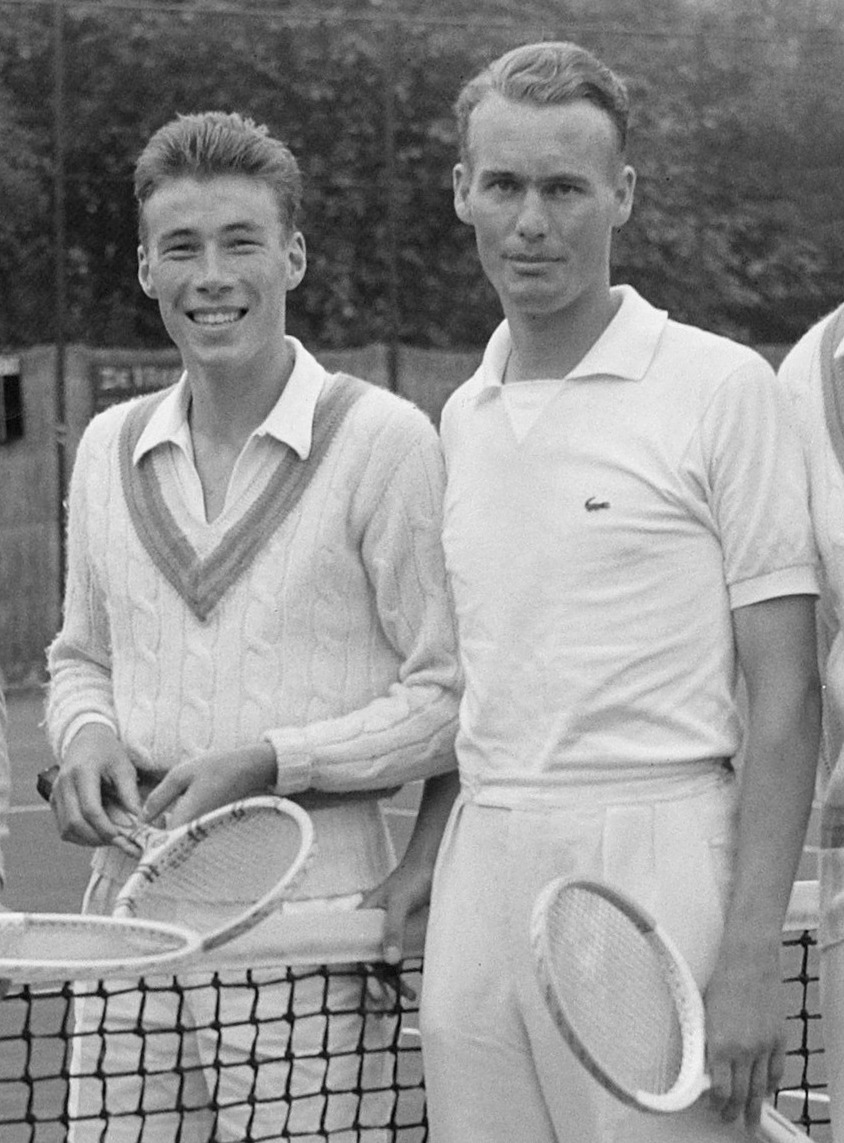
- Jacques Brichant and Ivo Rinkel in 1950
- Full name: Ivo Ferdinand Rinkel
- Country (sports): Netherlands
- Born: 27 October 1920; Semarang, Batavia
- Died: 16 March 2000 (aged 79); Baarn, Netherlands
- Plays: Left-handed

Singles

Grand Slam singles results
- Wimbledon: 3R (1946)

Doubles

Grand Slam doubles results
- Wimbledon: QF (1948)

Grand Slam mixed doubles results
- Wimbledon: 4R (1946, 1951)

Ivo Ferdinand Rinkel (27 October 1920 – 16 March 2000) was a Dutch tennis and field hockey player who was active in the 1940s and 1950s.

== Career ==
Ivo Rinkel won the 1945 Dutch Championship Singles title. Partnered with Huib Wilton and Hans van Swol, he won six national doubles titles from 1945 to 1950, as well as mixed doubles titles in 1946 and 1950. Rinkel participated in six Wimbledon Championships from 1946 to 1952. With Van Swol, he reached the quarterfinals of the men's doubles competition in 1948. His best result in the singles competition came in 1946 when he reached the third round in which he lost to Frenchman Pierre Pellizza.

In 1947, he won the triple crown at the British Covered Court Championships at the Queen's Club in London. In the singles final, he defeated Ernest Wittman in three sets. With R.E. Carter, he won the men's doubles title, defeating H. Billington and Ignacy Tłoczyński in the final. In the mixed doubles, he partnered with Mrs. P.J. Halford and in the final they proved too strong for John Olliff and Peggy Dawson-Scott. From 1946 to 1952, he played in 10 ties for the Dutch Davis Cup team, comprising a record of seven wins and five losses.

Rinkel played field hockey for the Gooische Hockey Club. In 1950–1951, he was a member of the Dutch National Hockey Team. After his sports career, Rinkel became captain of the Netherlands Davis Cup team.

== Personal life ==
He married British tennis player Jean Quertier on 28 February 1952 in Roehampton, and the couple had two daughters.
