= Geoffrey Paish =

British tennis player

- Country (sports): United Kingdom
- Born: 2 January 1922 Croydon, London
- Died: 3 February 2008 (aged 86)
- Turned pro: 1968 (amateur from 1946)
- Retired: 1976
- Plays: Right-handed (one-handed backhand)

Singles
- Career record: 17

Geoffrey Lane Paish MBE (2 January 1922 – 3 February 2008) was a noted tennis player and administrator. Paish was born in Croydon, Surrey and educated at Mid-Whitgift School (now Trinity School) in Croydon.

== Career ==
After World War II Paish worked at the Inland Revenue playing tennis only part-time. However he did manage to become a regular member of the GB Davis Cup team for which he played in 23 singles and 17 doubles matches. Between 1951 and 1955 Paish won five consecutive singles titles at the South of England Championships tournament in Eastbourne. After Paish's playing days were over he rose to become one of the most influential administrators in post-World War II GB tennis.
