= Hans van Swol =

Dutch tennis player

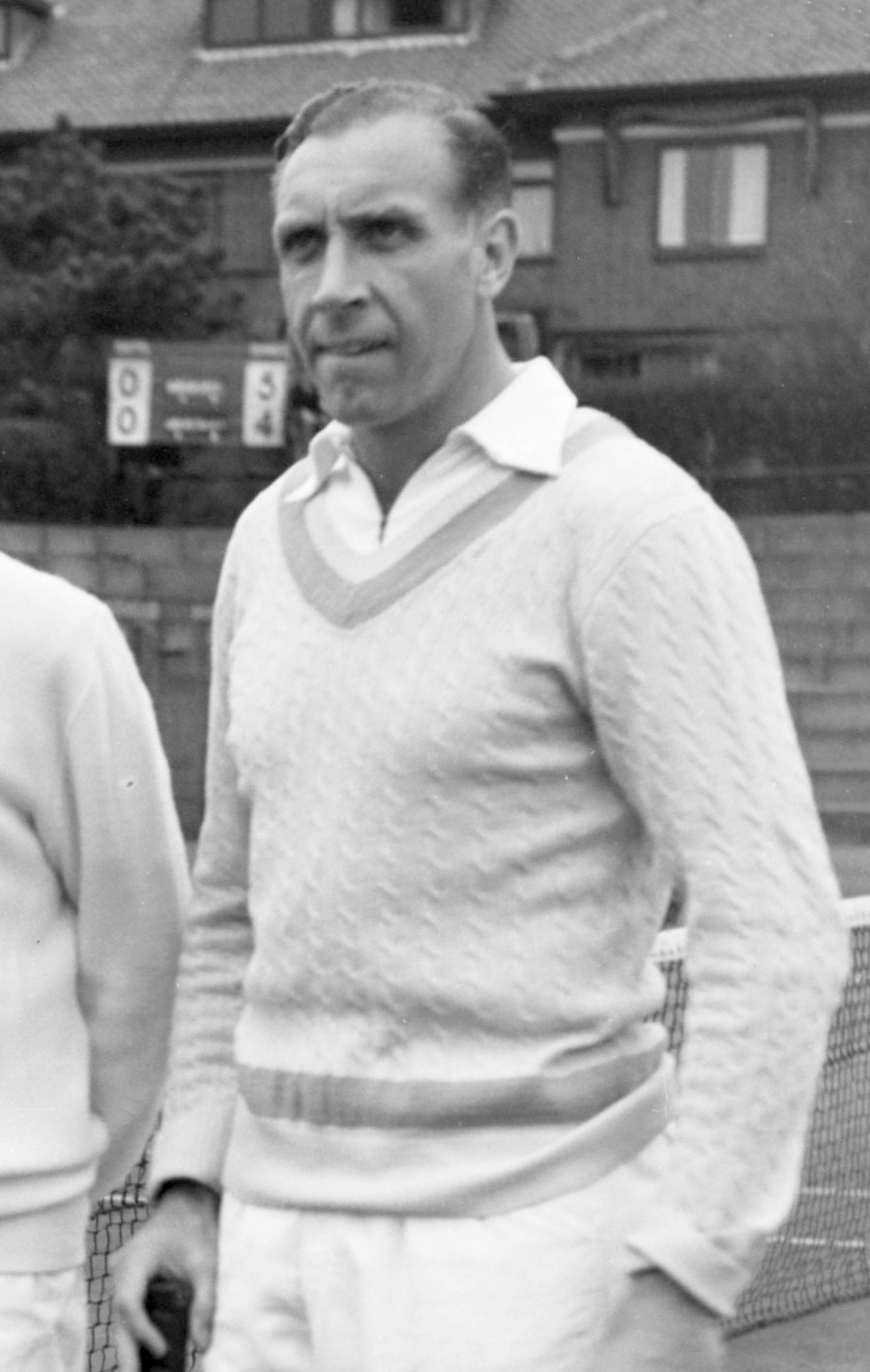
- Hans van Swol in 1953
- Full name: Albertus Christiaan van Swol
- Country (sports): Netherlands
- Born: 22 August 1914 Amsterdam, Netherlands
- Died: 10 May 2010 (aged 95) Amsterdam, Netherlands
- Plays: Right-handed

Singles

Grand Slam singles results
- French Open: 3R (1937)
- Wimbledon: 4R (1946, 1948–1951)

Doubles

Grand Slam doubles results
- Wimbledon: QF (1938, 1939, 1946)

Albertus Christiaan "Hans" van Swol (Dutch pronunciation: [ˈɦɑns fɑn ˈsʋɔl]; 22 August 1914 – 20 May 2010) was a Dutch tennis player. He was five-fold Dutch singles champion (1938, 1940, 1941, 1948 and 1949). He reached the fourth round at Wimbledon on five occasions (1946, 1948–1951) but never made it to the quarter finals stage. He reached the third round of the French Championships at Roland-Garros in 1937.

In June 1946 he won the singles title at the Surrey Grass Court Championships in Surbiton, defeating D.W. Butler in the final in three sets.

Van Swol played in 16 ties for the Dutch Davis Cup team between 1937 and 1955 and compiled a record of 18 wins and 21 losses. Best result during that period was reaching the quarterfinal of the European zone in 1948 and 1951.

The Royal Dutch Lawn Tennis Association (KNLTB) awards the 'A.C. Van Swol Beker' (A.C. Van Swol Cup) on a yearly basis to the most successful Dutch tennis talent who has not yet reached the age of 17. In 2003 he personally awarded the cup to Michaëlla Krajicek.

From 1954 until her death in 1999, he was married to soprano Gré Brouwenstijn, a famous Dutch opera singer whose stage career spanned from the early 1940s to the mid-1970s.
