= 1952 French Championships – Men's singles =

Men's singles
- 1952 French Championships

Final
- Champion: (Egypt) Jaroslav Drobný
- Runner-up: (Australia) Frank Sedgman
- Score: 6–2, 6–0, 3–6, 6–4

Details
- Draw: 114
- Seeds: 16

Events
Singles	men	women		boys	girls
Doubles	men	women	mixed	boys	girls
- French Championships

First-seeded Jaroslav Drobný defeated Frank Sedgman 6–2, 6–0, 3–6, 6–4 in the final to win the men's singles tennis title at the 1952 French Championships.

This was the final major appearance of two-time former French Open champion Gottfried von Cramm.

== Seeds ==
The seeded players are listed below. Jaroslav Drobný is the champion; others show the round in which they were eliminated.

1. (Egypt) Jaroslav Drobný (champion)
2. (Australia) Frank Sedgman (final)
3. (United States) Dick Savitt (quarterfinals)
4. (Australia) Ken McGregor (semifinals)
5. (United States) Tony Trabert (fourth round)
6. (South Africa) Eric Sturgess (semifinals)
7. (United States) Budge Patty (quarterfinals)
8. (United States) Gardnar Mulloy (quarterfinals)
9. (Australia) Mervyn Rose (fourth round)
10. (Italy) Rolando Del Bello (fourth round)
11. (United States) Ham Richardson (fourth round)
12. (Philippines) Felicisimo Ampon (quarterfinals)
13. (Italy) Giovanni Cucelli (fourth round)
14. (United States) Irvin Dorfman (fourth round)
15. (Argentina) Enrique Morea (second round)
16. (United States) Grant Golden (second round)

== Draw ==
=== Key ===
- Q = Qualifier
- WC = Wild card
- LL = Lucky loser
- r = Retired

=== Finals ===
Quarterfinals
1	(Egypt) Jaroslav Drobný	6	6	6
8	(United States) Gardnar Mulloy	1	2	2
4	(Australia) Ken McGregor	6	6	6
12	(Philippines) Felicisimo Ampon	1	1	2
6	(South Africa) Eric Sturgess	6	6	4	8	6
3	(United States) Dick Savitt	2	8	6	6	3
7	(United States) Budge Patty	4	2	2
2	(Australia) Frank Sedgman	6	6	6

Semifinals
1	(Egypt) Jaroslav Drobný	6	6	4	6
4	(Australia) Ken McGregor	3	0	6	3
6	(South Africa) Eric Sturgess	5	2	6
2	(Australia) Frank Sedgman	7	6	8

Final
1	(Egypt) Jaroslav Drobný	6	6	3	6
2	(Australia) Frank Sedgman	2	0	6	4

=== Earlier rounds ===
==== Section 1 ====
First round
(Brazil) Saller	1	4	1
(Australia) Rosewall	6	6	6

Second round
1	(Egypt) Drobný
(Italy) Scribani
(France) Delhomme	6	6	6
(United States) Wilder	2	4	2
16	(United States) Golden	4	6	6	2	3
(United Kingdom) Mottram	6	4	3	6	6
(Italy) Gardini	6	6	2	2	6
(Australia) Rosewall	2	4	6	6	2

Third round
1	(Egypt) Drobný	6	6	6
(France) Delhomme	0	1	0
(United Kingdom) Mottram	4	4	2
(Italy) Gardini	6	6	6

Fourth round
1	(Egypt) Drobný	6	6	6
(Italy) Gardini	3	2	1

==== Section 2 ====
First round
8	(United States) Mulloy	6	6	6
(France) Grandet	4	0	1
(Italy) Del Bello	6	6	9
(Switzerland) Buser	3	2	7
(Belgium) Mezzi
(France) Jauffret	w/o
(France) Abdesselam	6	6	6
(France) Lemasson	3	3	3
(Sweden) Blomquist	0	11	4
(South Africa) Norgarb	6	13	6
(France) Iemetti	3	3	3
(Argentina) Russell	6	6	6
(France) Berthet	6	3	1
9	(Australia) Rose	8	6	6
(France) Ducos De La Haille
(Egypt) Ismail

Second round
8	(United States) Mulloy	6	7	6
(Italy) Del Bello	3	5	4
(Belgium) Mezzi	4	3	4
(France) Abdesselam	6	6	6
(South Africa) Norgarb	2	3	3
(Argentina) Russell	6	6	6
9	(Australia) Rose	6	6	6
(Egypt) Ismail	2	3	3

Third round
8	(United States) Mulloy	6	8	7
(France) Abdesselam	4	6	5
(Argentina) Russell	0	2	4
9	(Australia) Rose	6	6	6

Fourth round
8	(United States) Mulloy	6	6	8	6
9	(Australia) Rose	3	1	6	4

==== Section 3 ====
First round
4	(Australia) McGregor	6	6	6
(France) Laval	2	2	2
(Spain) Olozaga	6	4	2	4
(France) Nys	4	6	6	6
(Socialist Federal Republic of Yugoslavia) Branović	6	6	6
(Brazil) Vieira	2	3	3
(Germany) Buchholz	6	3	9	5
(France) De Kermadec	8	6	7	7
(United States) Clark	7	6	7
(France) Weiss	5	3	5
(France) Molinari	6	6	6
(Switzerland) Blondel	3	1	3
(Chile) Balbiers	6	6	6
(United Kingdom) Anderson	2	1	3
(France) Chatrier	0	2	2
13	(Italy) Cucelli	6	6	6

Second round
4	(Australia) McGregor	6	6	6
(France) Nys	3	0	4
(Socialist Federal Republic of Yugoslavia) Branović	6	1	6	6
(France) De Kermadec	0	6	2	1
(United States) Clark	6	6	6
(France) Molinari	0	4	4
(Chile) Balbiers	6	2	3	2
13	(Italy) Cucelli	4	6	6	6

Third round
4	(Australia) McGregor	7	7	6
(Socialist Federal Republic of Yugoslavia) Branović	5	5	4
(United States) Clark	6	2	5	4
13	(Italy) Cucelli	0	6	7	6

Fourth round
4	(Australia) McGregor	4	6	6	6
13	(Italy) Cucelli	6	1	2	3

==== Section 4 ====
First round
5	(United States) Trabert	6	6	6
(France) Becker	2	2	2
(France) Malosse
(Socialist Federal Republic of Yugoslavia) Pallada
(Germany) Göpfert	10	2	4	0
(South Africa) Williams	8	6	6	6
(Switzerland) Spitzer	6	7	6
(Argentina) Soriano	2	5	2
(Sweden) Fornstedt	6	6	6
(France) Pinart	0	2	3
(France) Destremau	6	6	6
(Uruguay) Argon	3	4	3
(France) Jalabert	2	3	2
12	(Philippines) Ampon	6	6	6
(Poland) Skonecki	6	6	6
(Netherlands) Van Meegeren	4	1	3

Second round
5	(United States) Trabert	6	6	6
(France) Malosse	1	1	1
(South Africa) Williams	6	4	6	6
(Switzerland) Spitzer	4	6	2	3
(Sweden) Fornstedt	5	3	4
(France) Destremau	7	6	6
12	(Philippines) Ampon	6	6	5	1	6
(Poland) Skonecki	4	1	7	6	1

Third round
5	(United States) Trabert	6	6	7
(South Africa) Williams	4	1	5
(France) Destremau	7	3	9	3	5
12	(Philippines) Ampon	5	6	7	6	7

Fourth round
5	(United States) Trabert	5	1	1
12	(Philippines) Ampon	7	6	6

==== Section 5 ====
First round
(Egypt) El Shafei
(France) Pellizza
11	(United States) Richardson	6	4	6	6
(France) Favieres	0	6	1	3
(France) Larcade	1	2	6	3
(France) Haillet	6	6	0	6
(France) Sanglier	1	1	1
(South Africa) Capell	6	6	6
(Italy) Bergamo
(Belgium) Froment
(Colombia) Rodriguez	0	0	0
(France) Rémy	6	6	6
(Socialist Federal Republic of Yugoslavia) Milojkovic
(Australia) Hoad	w	o
(France) Freling	1	3	0
6	(South Africa) Sturgess	6	6	6

Second round
(France) Pellizza	4	1	3
11	(United States) Richardson	6	6	6
(France) Haillet	6	10	6
(South Africa) Capell	3	8	1
(Belgium) Froment	1	2	1
(France) Rémy	6	6	6
(Australia) Hoad	7	6	4
6	(South Africa) Sturgess	9	8	6

Third round
11	(United States) Richardson	6	6	1	6
(France) Haillet	4	3	6	1
(France) Rémy	4	9	6	9
6	(South Africa) Sturgess	6	11	4	11

Fourth round
11	(United States) Richardson	5	5	1
6	(South Africa) Sturgess	7	7	6

==== Section 6 ====
First round
14	(United States) Dorfman	6	6	7
(Brazil) Agüero	2	1	5
(Denmark) Ulrich	5	2	3
(Belgium) Washer	7	6	6
(United Kingdom) Becker	3	2	10	6
(Chile) Ayala	6	6	8	8
(Australia) Candy	6	6	6
(India) Nath	2	1	2
(Socialist Federal Republic of Yugoslavia) Mitić	6	6	6
(United Kingdom) Oakley	4	2	4
(Argentina) Weiss
(Italy) Merlo
(Southern Rhodesia) Katz	1	3	6	5
(France) Schaff	6	6	3	7
(France) Dessair	0	1	6	2
3	(United States) Savitt	6	6	4	6

Second round
14	(United States) Dorfman	6	6	8
(Belgium) Washer	3	2	6
(Chile) Ayala	4	6	6	6
(Australia) Candy	6	3	2	2
(Socialist Federal Republic of Yugoslavia) Mitić	3	3	6	6
(Italy) Merlo	6	6	0	8
(France) Schaff	0	0	2
3	(United States) Savitt	6	6	6

Third round
14	(United States) Dorfman	6	6	6
(Chile) Ayala	4	1	1
(Italy) Merlo	4	3	7
3	(United States) Savitt	6	6	9

Fourth round
14	(United States) Dorfman	7	7	1	2
3	(United States) Savitt	9	5	6	6

==== Section 7 ====
First round
(France) Bernard	6	3	6	6
(France) Lesage	2	6	1	4
(Chile) San Hueza	2	7	5	5
10	(Italy) Del Bello	6	5	7	7
(United States) Cohen	1	2	4
(France) Jamain	6	6	6
(Germany) von Cramm
(Spain) Martínez
(Belgium) Peten
(Socialist Federal Republic of Yugoslavia) Petrovic
(France) Pilet
(Australia) Hopman
(Egypt) Sursock	0	0	0
(France) Lemyze	6	6	6
(Egypt) Zalzal	3	3	0
7	(United States) Patty	6	6	6

Second round
(France) Bernard	1	3	1
10	(Italy) Del Bello	6	6	6
(France) Jamain
(Spain) Martínez
(Belgium) Peten	6	6	6
(France) Pilet	0	0	3
(France) Lemyze	6	3	4
7	(United States) Patty	8	6	6

Third round
10	(Italy) Del Bello	6	6	6
(France) Jamain	3	2	4
(Belgium) Peten	2	6	2	6	3
7	(United States) Patty	6	2	6	2	6

Fourth round
10	(Italy) Del Bello	6	1	2	5
7	(United States) Patty	3	6	6	7

==== Section 8 ====
First round
(Hungary) Huszár	2	0	6	7
(France) Thomas	6	6	3	9

Second round
(France) Thomas	3	4	2
(Denmark) Nielsen	6	6	6
(South Africa) Cockburn	3	6	6	6
15	(Argentina) Morea	6	3	4	3
(France) Dubuc	6	6	6
(Egypt) Coen	3	3	0
(United States) Garrett	0	3	2
2	(Australia) Sedgman	6	6	6

Third round
(Denmark) Nielsen	0	6	6	3	6
(South Africa) Cockburn	6	3	3	6	4
(France) Dubuc	1	3	1
2	(Australia) Sedgman	6	6	6

Fourth round
(Denmark) Nielsen	1	6	4
2	(Australia) Sedgman	6	8	6

Preceded by 1952 Australian Championships – Men's singles	Grand Slam men's singles	Succeeded by 1952 Wimbledon Championships – Men's singles
