= 1952 Wimbledon Championships – Men's singles =

Men's singles
- 1952 Wimbledon Championships

Final
- Champion: (Australia) Frank Sedgman
- Runner-up: (Egypt) Jaroslav Drobný
- Score: 4–6, 6–2, 6–3, 6–2

Details
- Draw: 128 (10Q)
- Seeds: 12

Events
Singles	men	women		boys	girls
Doubles	men	women	mixed	boys	girls
- Wimbledon Championships

In the 1952 Wimbledon Championships – Gentlemen's Singles tennis competition, number one seed Frank Sedgman defeated number two seed Jaroslav Drobný in the final, 4–6, 6–2, 6–3, 6–2 to win the title. Dick Savitt was the defending champion, but lost in the quarterfinals to Mervyn Rose.

== Progress of the tournament ==
Drobný was representing Egypt, having defected from Czechoslovakia in 1949 and been offered Egyptian citizenship in 1950. It was his second Wimbledon men's singles final, and he defeated the number 5 and 6 seeds (Australia's Ken McGregor and the US's Herbie Flam) to get there. Another Australian, number 8 seed Mervyn Rose, having defeated Savitt, was beaten by the eventual champion, Sedgman, in the semifinals.

== Seeds ==
1. (Australia) Frank Sedgman (champion)
2. (Egypt) Jaroslav Drobný (final)
3. (United States) Vic Seixas (quarterfinals)
4. (United States) Dick Savitt (quarterfinals)
5. (Australia) Ken McGregor (quarterfinals)
6. (United States) Herbie Flam (semifinals)
7. (South Africa) Eric Sturgess (quarterfinals)
8. (Australia) Mervyn Rose (semifinals)
9. (United States) Art Larsen (first round)
10. (United States) Gardnar Mulloy (fourth round)
11. (United States) Ham Richardson (first round)
12. (United States) Budge Patty (fourth round)

Click on the seed number of a player to go to their draw section.

== Draw ==
Key

- Q = Qualifier
- WC = Wild card
- LL = Lucky loser
- Alt = Alternate
- ITF = ITF entry
- PR = Protected ranking
- SR = Special ranking
- SE = Special exempt
- JE = Junior exempt
- JR = Junior Accelerator Programme entrant
- CO = College Accelerator Programme entrant
- NG = Next Gen Accelerator Program entrant
- w/o = Walkover
- r = Retired
- d = Defaulted

=== Finals ===
Quarterfinals
1	(Australia) Frank Sedgman	7	6	6
7	(South Africa) Eric Sturgess	5	1	0
4	(United States) Dick Savitt	4	6	4	6	2
8	(Australia) Mervyn Rose	6	3	6	4	6
6	(United States) Herbie Flam	6	3	6	7
3	(United States) Vic Seixas	4	6	3	5
5	(Australia) Ken McGregor	0	6	6	5	5
2	(Egypt) Jaroslav Drobný	6	3	2	7	7

Semifinals
1	(Australia) Frank Sedgman	6	6	7
8	(Australia) Mervyn Rose	4	4	5
6	(United States) Herbie Flam	2	4	6	10	4
2	(Egypt) Jaroslav Drobný	6	6	0	8	6

Final
1	(Australia) Frank Sedgman	4	6	6	6
2	(Egypt) Jaroslav Drobný	6	2	3	2

=== Top half ===
==== Section 1 ====
First round
1	(Australia) Frank Sedgman	6	6	6
(Spain) Jaime Bartrolí	1	0	2
(Argentina) Heraldo Weiss	w/o
Q	(Southern Rhodesia) Basil Katz
(Belgium) Philippe Washer	6	6	6
(Hong Kong) Ip Koon Hung	1	4	4
(United States) Alastair Martin	w/o
(United Kingdom) Henry Billington
11	(United States) Ham Richardson	6	7	2	3	0
(Philippines) Felicisimo Ampon	1	5	6	6	6
(Australia) Don Candy	6	6	6
Q	(United Kingdom) Bob Lee	1	1	0
(Chile) Ricardo Balbiers	6	6	6
(Finland) Sakari Salo	4	1	4
(Socialist Federal Republic of Yugoslavia) Milan Branović	3	4	3
(United Kingdom) Claude Lister	6	6	6

Second round
1	(Australia) F Sedgman	6	6	6
Q	(Southern Rhodesia) B Katz	1	1	2
(Belgium) P Washer	6	6	6
(United Kingdom) H Billington	2	4	2
(Philippines) F Ampon	4	6	5	5
(Australia) D Candy	6	4	7	7
(Chile) R Balbiers	8	6	6
(United Kingdom) C Lister	6	1	2

Third round
1	(Australia) F Sedgman	6	4	6	6
(Belgium) P Washer	3	6	3	3
(Australia) D Candy	6	6	6
(Chile) R Balbiers	0	1	4

Fourth round
1	(Australia) F Sedgman	6	6	6
(Australia) D Candy	2	1	0

==== Section 2 ====
First round
7	(South Africa) Eric Sturgess	8	6	6
(Austria) Hans Redl	6	2	2
(Socialist Federal Republic of Yugoslavia) Vladimir Petrović	1	4	6	6	1
Q	(Kenya) Rusty Mayers	6	6	3	1	6
(United Kingdom) Malcolm Gracie	1	3	1
(Italy) Giovanni Cucelli	6	6	6
(United Kingdom) Tony Mottram	6	6	6
(United Kingdom) Headley Baxter	2	4	1
9	(United States) Art Larsen	8	6	4	2
(Sweden) Torsten Johansson	10	2	6	6
(Republic of Ireland) Joe Hackett	6	3	3	4
(Australia) Phil Brophy	4	6	6	6
(Netherlands) Fred Dehnert	6	3	3	4
(United Kingdom) Howard Walton	4	6	6	6
(Brazil) Pedro Guimarães	2	1	0
(United States) Grant Golden	6	6	6

Second round
7	(South Africa) E Sturgess	6	6	6
Q	(Kenya) R Mayers	1	0	1
(Italy) G Cucelli	2	4	7
(United Kingdom) A Mottram	6	6	9
(Sweden) T Johansson	6	6	6
(Australia) P Brophy	4	0	3
(United Kingdom) H Walton	5	1	0
(United States) G Golden	7	6	6

Third round
7	(South Africa) E Sturgess	6	6	6
(United Kingdom) A Mottram	4	3	4
(Sweden) T Johansson	3	6	1	6	1
(United States) G Golden	6	4	6	4	6

Fourth round
7	(South Africa) E Sturgess	4	6	6	7	6
(United States) G Golden	6	3	1	9	4

==== Section 3 ====
First round
4	(United States) Dick Savitt	6	6	6
(India) Naresh Kumar	1	2	0
(Southern Rhodesia) Cecil Irvine	3	9	3	2
(United Kingdom) Gerry Oakley	6	7	6	6
(Chile) Luis Ayala	8	7	6	6
(Czechoslovakia) Milan Matouš	6	9	2	0
(United States) Harry Likas	6	0	6	6
(Australia) Peter Cawthorn	2	6	0	2
(United Kingdom) Don Butler	1	3	3
(Belgium) Jacques Brichant	6	6	6
(Poland) Ignacy Tłoczyński	4	4	6	6	6
(France) Philippe Chatrier	6	6	2	0	4
(South Africa) Derek Capell	6	6	4	6
Q	(United States) John Ager	0	0	6	1
(Iran) Matthew Mohtadi	4	3	7	2
(South Africa) Bryan Woodroffe	6	6	5	6

Second round
4	(United States) R Savitt	6	6	8
(United Kingdom) G Oakley	1	4	6
(Chile) L Ayala	4	5	4
(United States) H Likas	6	7	6
(Belgium) J Brichant	6	6	3	7
(Poland) I Tłoczyński	3	3	6	5
(South Africa) D Capell	6	6	2	3	6
(South Africa) B Woodroffe	3	2	6	6	2

Third round
4	(United States) R Savitt	6	6	3	6
(United States) H Likas	1	3	6	3
(Belgium) J Brichant	6	3	6	6	6
(South Africa) D Capell	3	6	8	2	4

Fourth round
4	(United States) R Savitt	6	6	6
(Belgium) J Brichant	3	3	3

==== Section 4 ====
First round
8	(Australia) Mervyn Rose	7	7	8
(Australia) Ian Ayre	5	5	6
Q	(United States) Pablo Eisenberg	2	6	6	3	4
(West Germany) Horst Hermann	6	3	4	6	6
(Denmark) Kurt Nielsen	6	6	6
(France) Bernard Destremau	0	1	4
(Socialist Federal Republic of Yugoslavia) Josip Palada	6	6	6
Q	(United Kingdom) Martin Hime	4	2	4
(United Kingdom) Clive Bernstein	6	3	6	6
(Switzerland) Erwin Balestra	1	6	1	3
(Italy) Fausto Gardini	7	7	6
(Brazil) Eugenio Saller	5	5	3
(Netherlands) Ivo Rinkel	6	6	6
(Austria) Gustav Specht	2	1	4
(United States) Straight Clark	6	6	7
(Socialist Federal Republic of Yugoslavia) Dragutin Mitić	1	2	5

Second round
8	(Australia) M Rose	6	6	7	6
(West Germany) H Hermann	8	1	5	0
(Denmark) K Nielsen	6	6	6
(Socialist Federal Republic of Yugoslavia) J Palada	3	4	4
(United Kingdom) C Bernstein	3	3	0
(Italy) F Gardini	6	6	6
(Netherlands) I Rinkel	1	0	1
(United States) S Clark	6	6	6

Third round
8	(Australia) M Rose	8	6	6
(Denmark) K Nielsen	6	4	3
(Italy) F Gardini	1	1	2
(United States) S Clark	6	6	6

Fourth round
8	(Australia) M Rose	6	6	6
(United States) S Clark	2	2	4

=== Bottom half ===
==== Section 5 ====
First round
(Italy) Marcello del Bello	6	4	6	6
(Egypt) Ismail Adel	3	6	1	0
(Argentina) Salvador Soriano	6	3	3	3
(Sweden) Staffan Stockenberg	4	6	6	6
(United Kingdom) John Barrett	2	2	0
(Australia) Ken Rosewall	6	6	6
(Poland) Władysław Skonecki	1	3	6
10	(United States) Gardnar Mulloy	6	6	8
(Republic of Ireland) Cyril Kemp	1	0	2
(United States) Gene Garrett	6	6	6
(Brazil) José Agüero	0	2	3
(Denmark) Torben Ulrich	6	6	6
(United Kingdom) Derek Bull	3	2	1
(United Kingdom) Geoffrey Paish	6	6	6
(South Africa) Owen Williams	3	6	4
6	(United States) Herbie Flam	6	8	6

Second round
(Italy) M del Bello	5	4	6
(Sweden) S Stockenberg	7	6	8
(Australia) K Rosewall	7	3	6
10	(United States) G Mulloy	9	6	8
(United States) W Garrett	4	3	0
(Denmark) T Ulrich	6	6	6
(United Kingdom) G Paish	2	6	5
6	(United States) H Flam	6	8	7

Third round
(Sweden) S Stockenberg	5	6	6	2	2^{r}
10	(United States) G Mulloy	7	4	3	6	4
(Denmark) T Ulrich	5	2	6
6	(United States) H Flam	7	6	8

Fourth round
10	(United States) G Mulloy	4	5	1
6	(United States) H Flam	6	7	6

==== Section 6 ====
First round
(Belgium) Jacques Peten	5	6	5	1
(South Africa) Trevor Fancutt	7	2	7	6
(Socialist Federal Republic of Yugoslavia) Petko Milojković	0	2	4
(United Kingdom) John Horn	6	6	6
(South Africa) Leon Norgarb	6	3	8	6
(Chile) Carlos Sanhueza	2	6	6	3
(New Zealand) Athol Tills	1	2	1
12	(United States) Budge Patty	6	6	6
Q	(Hong Kong) Edwin Tsai	6	4	8	6	1
(France) Robert Haillet	2	6	10	4	6
(Argentina) Alejo Russell	6	6	6
Q	(United States) Steve Potts	1	2	0
(United Kingdom) Douglas Snart	2	6	4	1
(West Germany) Ernst Buchholz	6	3	6	6
(India) Narendra Nath	5	2	2
3	(United States) Vic Seixas	7	6	6

Second round
(South Africa) T Fancutt	4	3	9	3
(United Kingdom) J Horn	6	6	7	6
(South Africa) L Norgarb	4	3	4
12	(United States) J Patty	6	6	6
(France) R Haillet	7	4	4	6	3
(Argentina) A Russell	5	6	6	3	6
(West Germany) E Buchholz	2	1	4
3	(United States) V Seixas	6	6	6

Third round
(United Kingdom) J Horn	1	1	1
12	(United States) J Patty	6	6	6
(Argentina) A Russell	3	2	4
3	(United States) V Seixas	6	6	6

Fourth round
12	(United States) J Patty	5	6	3	5
3	(United States) V Seixas	7	4	6	7

==== Section 7 ====
First round
(United Kingdom) Peter Hare	2	1	3
(France) Jean-Claude Molinari	6	6	6
(Brazil) Armando Vieira	6	6	6
(Sweden) Nils Rohlsson	3	4	4
(Australia) Don Tregonning	2	3	4
(Dominion of Ceylon) Doug Scharenguivel	6	6	6
(United States) Irvin Dorfman	6	6	6
(United Kingdom) Stan Clark	2	4	4
(United Kingdom) Edmund David	6	7	8	6
(United Kingdom) Darrell Shaw	0	5	10	2
(United Kingdom) Roger Becker	1	1	2
(South Africa) Nigel Cockburn	6	6	6
(United Kingdom) George Godsell	2	4	4
(Argentina) Enrique Morea	6	6	6
(United Kingdom) Tony Starte	0	2	2
5	(Australia) Ken McGregor	6	6	6

Second round
(France) J-C Molinari	4	4	3
(Brazil) A Vieira	6	6	6
(Dominion of Ceylon) D Scharenguivel	1	1	6
(United States) I Dorfman	6	6	8
(United Kingdom) E David	2	3	3
(South Africa) N Cockburn	6	6	6
(Argentina) E Morea	5	4	4
5	(Australia) K McGregor	7	6	6

Third round
(Brazil) A Vieira	11	6	7
(United States) I Dorfman	9	1	5
(South Africa) N Cockburn	0	6	4	3
5	(Australia) K McGregor	6	4	6	6

Fourth round
(Brazil) A Vieira	7	3	1	3
5	(Australia) K McGregor	5	6	6	6

==== Section 8 ====
First round
(Republic of Ireland) Guy Jackson	5	7	7	6
(Switzerland) Jost Spitzer	7	5	5	2
(Austria) Freddie Huber	6	6	1	6
(Chile) Marcelo Taverne	2	4	6	4
(Italy) Rolando del Bello	6	6	6
(United Kingdom) Tommy Anderson	3	4	0
(Italy) Giuseppe Merlo	6	5	6	2	2
(Australia) Lew Hoad	4	7	2	6	6
(Australia) Harry Hopman	1	5	3
(Netherlands) Hans van Swol	6	7	6
(Poland) Czesław Spychała	6	3	6	6
Q	(United Kingdom) Eric Bulmer	3	6	1	3
(United Kingdom) Bobby Wilson	6	6	7
(Belgium) Jean Moreau	2	4	5
Q	(United Kingdom) Billy Knight	0	1	3
2	(Egypt) Jaroslav Drobný	6	6	6

Second round
(Republic of Ireland) G Jackson	6	3	1	8
(Austria) A Huber	4	6	6	10
(Italy) R del Bello	3	6	4
(Australia) L Hoad	6	8	6
(Netherlands) A van Swol	10	6	6	6
(Poland) C Spychała	12	0	2	2
(United Kingdom) R Wilson	0	1	3
2	(Egypt) J Drobný	6	6	6

Third round
(Austria) A Huber	6	2	3	1
(Australia) L Hoad	4	6	6	6
(Netherlands) A van Swol	0	1	4
2	(Egypt) J Drobný	6	6	6

Fourth round
(Australia) L Hoad	3	6	6	3
2	(Egypt) J Drobný	6	3	8	6

Preceded by 1952 French Championships	Grand Slams; Men's Singles	Succeeded by 1952 U.S. Championships
