= 1948 French Championships – Men's singles =

Men's singles
- 1948 French Championships

Final
- Champion: (United States) Frank Parker
- Runner-up: (Czechoslovakia) Jaroslav Drobný
- Score: 8–6, 7–5, 6–4

Details
- Seeds: 16

Events
Singles	men	women
Doubles	men	women
← 1947 ·	French Championships	· 1949 →

Frank Parker defeated Jaroslav Drobný 6–4, 7–5, 5–7, 8–6 in the final to win the men's singles tennis title at the 1948 French Championships.

== Seeds ==
The seeded players are listed below. Frank Parker is the champion; others show the round in which they were eliminated.

1. (United States) Frank Parker (champion)
2. (Hungary) József Asbóth (second round)
3. (Australia) John Bromwich (first round)
4. (South Africa) Eric Sturgess (semifinals)
5. (France) Marcel Bernard (quarterfinals)
6. (Czechoslovakia) Jaroslav Drobný (finalist)
7. (United States) Budge Patty (semifinals)
8. (Italy) Giovanni Cucelli (quarterfinals)
9. (Australia) Frank Sedgman (fourth round)
10. (Socialist Federal Republic of Yugoslavia) Dragutin Mitić (fourth round)
11. (United Kingdom) Tony Mottram (fourth round)
12. (Socialist Federal Republic of Yugoslavia) Josip Pallada (fourth round)
13. (Belgium) Philippe Washer (fourth round)
14. (Sweden) Lennart Bergelin (quarterfinals)
15. (Italy) Marcello Del Bello (quarterfinals)
16. (Poland) Władysław Skonecki (second round)

== Draw ==
=== Key ===
- Q = Qualifier
- WC = Wild card
- LL = Lucky loser
- r = Retired

=== Finals ===
Quarterfinals
1	(United States) Frank Parker	6	6	6
8	(Italy) Giovanni Cucelli	1	2	1
4	(South Africa) Eric Sturgess	6	6	9
5	(France) Marcel Bernard	3	2	7
6	(Czechoslovakia) Jaroslav Drobný	6	6	6
14	(Sweden) Lennart Bergelin	2	1	4
7	(United States) Budge Patty	6	6	8
15	(Italy) Marcello Del Bello	1	3	6

Semifinals
1	(United States) Frank Parker	6	6	6
4	(South Africa) Eric Sturgess	2	2	1
6	(Czechoslovakia) Jaroslav Drobný	2	6	4	6	6
7	(United States) Budge Patty	6	3	6	4	3

Final
1	(United States) Frank Parker	6	7	5	8
6	(Czechoslovakia) Jaroslav Drobný	4	5	7	6

=== Earlier rounds ===
==== Section 1 ====
First round

Second round
1	(United States) Parker	6	6	6
(United Kingdom) Hare	1	1	1
(Hungary) Katona	3	3	6	3
(France) Destremau	6	6	4	6
16	(Poland) Skonecki
(Socialist Federal Republic of Yugoslavia) Kukuljević
(France) Iemetti	5	2	3
(Czechoslovakia) Vrba	7	6	6

Third round
1	(United States) Parker	8	4	7	13
(France) Destremau	6	6	5	11
(Socialist Federal Republic of Yugoslavia) Kukuljević	4	6	3	6	3
(Czechoslovakia) Vrba	6	1	6	3	6

Fourth round
1	(United States) Parker	6	7	6
(Czechoslovakia) Vrba	1	5	1

==== Section 2 ====
First round

Second round
8	(Italy) Cucelli	6	6	6
(United States) Young	3	3	2
(France) Billaudot	1	1	6
(India) Bose	6	6	8
(France) Weiss	1	4	3
9	(Australia) Sedgman	6	6	6
(France) Boussus	8	2	7	7
(Spain) Szawoszt	10	6	5	9

Third round
8	(Italy) Cucelli	6	6	6
(India) Bose	2	3	1
9	(Australia) Sedgman	6	6	6
(Spain) Szawoszt	4	3	1

Fourth round
8	(Italy) Cucelli	8	6	6
9	(Australia) Sedgman	6	4	3

==== Section 3 ====
First round
4	(South Africa) Sturgess	6	6	6
(France) Grandet	1	4	2
(India) Nath	2	6	1	6	6
(France) Pellizza	6	3	6	1	0
(Argentina) Morea	6	6	10	5
(France) Berthet	0	8	12	7
(France) De Kermadec	3	2	8	6	4
(France) Rémy	6	6	6	4	6
(Italy) Belardinelli
(Switzerland) Blondel
13	(Belgium) Washer	6
(Hungary) Ádám-Stolpa	0	r
(Egypt) Coen	0	7	6	6
(France) Chevallier	6	5	2	4
(Australia) Hopman	6	8	6
(Monaco) Medecin	3	6	2

Second round
4	(South Africa) Sturgess	6	6	6
(India) Nath	4	3	1
(France) Berthet	6	8	3	0
(France) Rémy	3	10	6	6
(Switzerland) Blondel	3	3	2
13	(Belgium) Washer	6	6	6
(Egypt) Coen	0	7	6	3	6
(Australia) Hopman	6	5	1	6	4

Third round
4	(South Africa) Sturgess	6	6	6
(France) Rémy	4	4	2
13	(Belgium) Washer	6	6	3	6
(Egypt) Coen	8	1	6	2

Fourth round
4	(South Africa) Sturgess	6	6	6
13	(Belgium) Washer	4	4	3

==== Section 4 ====
First round
5	(France) Bernard	6	6	6
(France) Mottez	4	3	4
(France) Boulle	3	3	3
(France) Dubuc	6	6	6
(France) Zhendre	6	6	6
(France) Schaff	4	3	3
(United States) Robertson	6	3	4	3
(Netherlands) Van Meegeren	4	6	6	6
(France) Becker	2	4	4
(India) Sawhney	6	6	6
(France) Hugron	1	2	1
(Egypt) El Shafei	6	6	6
(France) Brugnon
12	(Socialist Federal Republic of Yugoslavia) Pallada
(Denmark) Ulrich	6	5	6	6
(Hungary) Pető	1	7	4	1

Second round
5	(France) Bernard	2	6	6	6
(France) Dubuc	6	4	3	4
(France) Zhendre	6	6	7	0
(Netherlands) Van Meegeren	8	4	9	6
(India) Sawhney	2	1	1
(Egypt) El Shafei	6	6	6
12	(Socialist Federal Republic of Yugoslavia) Pallada	6	6	6
(Denmark) Ulrich	4	1	3

Third round
5	(France) Bernard	6	6	4	6
(Netherlands) Van Meegeren	3	4	6	0
(Egypt) El Shafei	1	4	3
12	(Socialist Federal Republic of Yugoslavia) Pallada	6	6	6

Fourth round
5	(France) Bernard	4	6	2	7	6
12	(Socialist Federal Republic of Yugoslavia) Pallada	6	4	6	5	1

==== Section 5 ====
First round
(France) Chatrier	4	6	2	6	3
(Denmark) Nielsen	6	2	6	3	6
(France) Malosse
(France) Gentien
(Netherlands) Kryt
(Brazil) Fernandez
11	(United Kingdom) Mottram	6	4	6	6
(Hungary) Fehér	2	6	1	4
(France) Dessair	3	6	2	3
(France) Abdesselam	6	3	6	6
(France) Jaquemet
(France) Jamain
(France) Journu	6	6	4	6
(France) Colin	0	4	6	1
(France) Lips	1	1	1
6	(Czechoslovakia) Drobný	6	6	6

Second round
(Denmark) Nielsen	6	7	4	6
(France) Malosse	0	5	6	4
(Netherlands) Kryt	7	3	3	2
11	(United Kingdom) Mottram	5	6	6	6
(France) Abdesselam	6	6	6
(France) Jamain	2	3	2
(France) Journu	2	3	0
6	(Czechoslovakia) Drobný	6	6	6

Third round
(Denmark) Nielsen	6	7	3	4	0
11	(United Kingdom) Mottram	4	5	6	6	6
(France) Abdesselam	1	1	6
6	(Czechoslovakia) Drobný	6	6	8

Fourth round
11	(United Kingdom) Mottram	3	4	0
6	(Czechoslovakia) Drobný	6	6	6

==== Section 6 ====
First round
(France) Ducos De La Haille	3	3	10	6	6
(Belgium) Peten	6	6	8	4	3
14	(Sweden) Bergelin	6	6	6
(France) Laval	2	1	1
(France) Sanglier	6	6	3	6
(United States) Donnell	4	3	6	4
(Spain) Bartroli
(France) Favières
(Egypt) Najar	6	5	1	7	5
(France) Freling	0	7	6	5	7
(France) Gajan	3	2	1
(Italy) Sada	6	6	6
(Argentina) Weiss
(Monaco) Landau
(Switzerland) Buchi
3	(Australia) Bromwich

Second round
(France) Ducos De La Haille	1	3	0
14	(Sweden) Bergelin	6	6	6
(France) Sanglier	6	6	7
(Spain) Bartroli	1	4	5
(France) Freling	0	0	1
(Italy) Sada	6	6	6
(Argentina) Weiss	6	6	6
(Switzerland) Buchi	1	4	4

Third round
14	(Sweden) Bergelin	6	6	6
(France) Sanglier	0	1	4
(Italy) Sada	4	1	6
(Argentina) Weiss	6	6	8

Fourth round
14	(Sweden) Bergelin	6	6	6
(Argentina) Weiss	2	4	1

==== Section 7 ====
First round

Second round
10	(Socialist Federal Republic of Yugoslavia) Mitić	6	6	6
(United Kingdom) Baxter	2	2	2
(India) Misra	1	4	5
(Monaco) Noghès	6	6	7
(France) Thomas	6	6	6
(France) Feret	4	3	2
(Netherlands) Borren	1	2	4
7	(United States) Patty	6	6	6

Third round
10	(Socialist Federal Republic of Yugoslavia) Mitić	7	6	6
(Monaco) Noghès	5	1	2
(France) Thomas	6	0	6	3
7	(United States) Patty	2	6	8	6

Fourth round
10	(Socialist Federal Republic of Yugoslavia) Mitić	0	0	4
7	(United States) Patty	6	6	6

==== Section 8 ====
First round

Second round
(France) Delhomme	1	1	4
15	(Italy) Del Bello	6	6	6
(Belgium) Geelhand De Merxem
(France) Grandguillot
(Argentina) Russell	6	6	1	3	3
(Czechoslovakia) Vodička	0	0	6	6	6
(Spain) Olozaga
2	(Hungary) Asbóth

Third round
15	(Italy) Del Bello	6	4	3	6	6
(Belgium) Geelhand De Merxem	4	6	6	4	3
(Czechoslovakia) Vodička	6	8	7
(Spain) Olozaga	4	6	5

Fourth round
15	(Italy) Del Bello	7	9	1
(Czechoslovakia) Vodička	5	7	0	r

Preceded by 1948 Australian Championships – Men's singles	Grand Slam men's singles	Succeeded by 1948 Wimbledon Championships – Men's singles
