= 1949 French Championships – Men's singles =

Men's singles
- 1949 French Championships

Final
- Champion: (United States) Frank Parker
- Runner-up: (United States) Budge Patty
- Score: 6–3, 1–6, 6–1, 6–4

Details
- Seeds: 16

Events
Singles	men	women
Doubles	men	women
← 1948 ·	French Championships	· 1950 →

Frank Parker defeated Budge Patty 6–3, 1–6, 6–1, 6–4 in the final to win the men's singles tennis title at the 1949 French Championships.

== Seeds ==
The seeded players are listed below. Frank Parker is the champion; others show the round in which they were eliminated.

1. (United States) Frank Parker (champion)
2. (United States) Richard Gonzales (semifinals)
3. (Italy) Giovanni Cucelli (quarterfinals)
4. (South Africa) Eric Sturgess (semifinals)
5. (Sweden) Lennart Bergelin (fourth round)
6. (United States) Budge Patty (finalist)
7. (France) Marcel Bernard (quarterfinals)
8. (Socialist Federal Republic of Yugoslavia) Dragutin Mitić (quarterfinals)
9. (France) Paul Rémy (fourth round)
10. (Socialist Federal Republic of Yugoslavia) Josip Pallada (fourth round)
11. (Philippines) Felicisimo Ampon (fourth round)
12. (France) Robert Abdesselam (quarterfinals)
13. (France) Jacques Thomas (fourth round)
14. (Socialist Federal Republic of Yugoslavia) Franjo Punčec (fourth round)
15. (Sweden) Torsten Johansson (fourth round)
16. (Chile) Ricardo Balbiers (fourth round)

== Draw ==
=== Key ===
- Q = Qualifier
- WC = Wild card
- LL = Lucky loser
- r = Retired

=== Finals ===
Quarterfinals
1	(United States) Frank Parker	6	6	6
8	(Socialist Federal Republic of Yugoslavia) Dragutin Mitić	0	2	4
4	(South Africa) Eric Sturgess	6	6	6
12	(France) Robert Abdesselam	1	4	2
6	(United States) Budge Patty	7	10	6	8
3	(Italy) Giovanni Cucelli	5	12	3	6
7	(France) Marcel Bernard	1	5	7	1
2	(United States) Pancho Gonzales	6	7	5	6

Semifinals
1	(United States) Frank Parker	6	6	6
4	(South Africa) Eric Sturgess	2	1	4
6	(United States) Budge Patty	6	6	3	6
2	(United States) Pancho Gonzales	4	3	6	3

Final
1	(United States) Frank Parker	6	1	6	6
6	(United States) Budge Patty	3	6	1	4

=== Earlier rounds ===
==== Section 1 ====
First round

Second round
1	(United States) Parker	6	6	6
(France) Grandguillot	3	1	2
(France) Berthet
(Egypt) Nimr
(Israel) Gornitzky	0	5	4
16	(Chile) Balbiers	6	7	6
(Socialist Federal Republic of Yugoslavia) Branović	6	2	7	r
(Italy) Pautassi	3	6	7

Third round
1	(United States) Parker	6	6	6
(France) Berthet	3	3	1
16	(Chile) Balbiers	6	6	6
(Italy) Pautassi	1	2	2

Fourth round
1	(United States) Parker	7	6	6
16	(Chile) Balbiers	5	2	2

==== Section 2 ====
First round

Second round
8	(Socialist Federal Republic of Yugoslavia) Mitić	6	9	6
(France) Colin	1	7	2
(South Africa) Cockburn	6	4	8	6	6
(Belgium) Washer	0	6	10	3	8
(France) Feret	4	4	2
9	(France) Rémy	6	6	6
(Chile) Taverne
(Egypt) Talaat

Third round
8	(Socialist Federal Republic of Yugoslavia) Mitić	6	6	8
(Belgium) Washer	2	2	6
9	(France) Rémy	2	6	5	6	6
(Chile) Taverne	6	1	7	4	3

Fourth round
8	(Socialist Federal Republic of Yugoslavia) Mitić	6	10	6
9	(France) Rémy	2	8	4

==== Section 3 ====
First round
(United Kingdom) Oakley	6	6	6
(Israel) Buntman	1	0	4
(France) Malosse
(Spain) Casale
(France) Pellizza	4	6	2	4
13	(France) Thomas	6	8	6	6
(France) Billaudot	2	6	2	1
(Socialist Federal Republic of Yugoslavia) Milojkovic	6	2	6	6
(France) Roger	6	6	6
(Israel) Finkelkraut	3	1	2

Second round
4	(South Africa) Sturgess	6	6	6
(France) Boussus	0	2	0
(Italy) Gardini	6	6	4	6
(United Kingdom) Oakley	2	3	6	1
(France) Malosse	8	7	6	3	0
13	(France) Thomas	6	5	8	6	6
(Socialist Federal Republic of Yugoslavia) Milojkovic	3	3	5
(France) Roger	6	6	7

Third round
4	(South Africa) Sturgess	6	6	7
(Italy) Gardini	1	1	5
13	(France) Thomas	5	6	4	6	6
(France) Roger	7	4	6	4	4

Fourth round
4	(South Africa) Sturgess	6	6	6
13	(France) Thomas	3	4	0

==== Section 4 ====
First round
5	(Sweden) Bergelin
(France) Rodel
(Monaco) Medecin	8	4	0
(France) Letang	10	6	6
(Belgium) Devroe	6	0	3	4
(Denmark) Bjerre	4	6	6	6
(Spain) Ferrer
(France) Jalabert
(France) Journu	6	6	5	6
(France) Iemetti	1	3	7	3
(South Vietnam) Gioi	1	2	2
12	(France) Abdesselam	6	6	6
(France) Dubuisson
(France) Becker
(France) Doublet	6	6	11
(Israel) Apel	1	2	9

Second round
5	(Sweden) Bergelin	6	6	6
(France) Letang	2	4	1
(Denmark) Bjerre	3	1	2
(France) Jalabert	6	6	6
(France) Journu	1	5	2
12	(France) Abdesselam	6	7	6
(France) Becker	6	5	6	6	6
(France) Doublet	3	7	8	3	2

Third round
5	(Sweden) Bergelin	6	6	6
(France) Jalabert	4	1	1
12	(France) Abdesselam	6	6	6
(France) Becker	1	4	4

Fourth round
5	(Sweden) Bergelin	4	0	3
12	(France) Abdesselam	6	6	6

==== Section 5 ====
First round
(South Africa) Fannin	6	6	6
(Switzerland) Dupont	2	2	2
(United Kingdom) Roberts	5	4	9
(France) Chatrier	7	6	11
(United States) Lord	4	6	6	5	3
(Israel) Avidan-Weiss	6	4	3	7	6
(Czechoslovakia) Hyks	5	4	1
11	(Philippines) Ampon	7	6	6
(Netherlands) Van Meegeren	6	8	4	6	7
(Sweden) Davidson	3	10	6	1	5
(France) Nys
(France) Schaff
(France) Sanglier
(Spain) Garriga Nogues
(France) Gajan	0	3	3
6	(United States) Patty	6	6	6

Second round
(South Africa) Fannin	13	6	3	1	3
(France) Chatrier	11	1	6	6	6
(Israel) Avidan-Weiss	1	4	2
11	(Philippines) Ampon	6	6	6
(Netherlands) Van Meegeren	6	7	10
(France) Schaff	4	5	8
(France) Sanglier	2	1	6
6	(United States) Patty	6	6	8

Third round
(France) Chatrier	4	4	1
11	(Philippines) Ampon	6	6	6
(Netherlands) Van Meegeren	6	4	4
6	(United States) Patty	8	6	6

Fourth round
11	(Philippines) Ampon	5	3	4
6	(United States) Patty	7	6	6

==== Section 6 ====
First round
(Egypt) Zalzal	5	2	1
(France) Jamain	7	6	6
(France) Grandet	6	6	4	6
(Spain) Olozaga	4	3	6	2
(Switzerland) Grange	2	3	3
14	(Socialist Federal Republic of Yugoslavia) Punčec	6	6	6
(Netherlands) Borren	1	6	3	2
(France) Favieres	6	4	6	6
(France) Laval	6	8	6
(France) Lemyze	2	6	3
(France) Delhomme	4	6	6	6
(France) Lesueur	6	0	1	4

Second round
(France) Jamain	4	6	3	6	4
(France) Grandet	6	4	6	3	6
14	(Socialist Federal Republic of Yugoslavia) Punčec	6	7	0	2	6
(France) Favieres	2	5	6	6	4
(France) Laval	2	2	1
(France) Delhomme	6	6	6
(Egypt) Coen	5	0	2
3	(Italy) Cucelli	7	6	6

Third round
(France) Grandet	4	5	2
14	(Socialist Federal Republic of Yugoslavia) Punčec	6	7	6
(France) Delhomme	6	2	3	2
3	(Italy) Cucelli	1	6	6	6

Fourth round
14	(Socialist Federal Republic of Yugoslavia) Punčec	6	3	2	5
3	(Italy) Cucelli	4	6	6	7

==== Section 7 ====
First round

Second round
(Egypt) El Shafei	2	1	r
10	(Socialist Federal Republic of Yugoslavia) Pallada	6	6
(Italy) Del Bello	6	6	6
(France) Lucot	4	4	3
(Belgium) Geelhand De Merxem	3	2	5
(South Africa) Levy	6	6	7
(France) Weiss	3	7	2	0
7	(France) Bernard	6	5	6	6

Third round
10	(Socialist Federal Republic of Yugoslavia) Pallada	7	6	6
(Italy) Del Bello	5	3	3
(South Africa) Levy	6	5	3	3
7	(France) Bernard	3	7	6	6

Fourth round
10	(Socialist Federal Republic of Yugoslavia) Pallada	0	7	6	6	0
7	(France) Bernard	6	9	2	4	6

==== Section 8 ====
First round

Second round
15	(Sweden) Johansson	6	6	6
(France) Chevallier	2	3	0
(Belgium) Peten	7	6	6
(France) De Kermadec	5	1	1
(France) Dubuc	6	2	6	6
(Czechoslovakia) Matouš	2	6	4	2
(France) Gentien	2	3	3
2	(United States) Gonzales	6	6	6

Third round
15	(Sweden) Johansson	6	6	6
(Belgium) Peten	4	3	4
(France) Dubuc	6	2	7
2	(United States) Gonzales	8	6	9

Fourth round
15	(Sweden) Johansson	13	4	6	4
2	(United States) Gonzales	15	6	4	6

Preceded by 1949 Australian Championships – Men's singles	Grand Slam men's singles	Succeeded by 1949 Wimbledon Championships – Men's singles
