= 1949 Wimbledon Championships – Men's singles =

Men's singles
- 1949 Wimbledon Championships

Final
- Champion: (United States) Ted Schroeder
- Runner-up: (Czechoslovakia) Jaroslav Drobný
- Score: 3–6, 6–0, 6–3, 4–6, 6–4

Details
- Draw: 128 (10Q)
- Seeds: 8

Events
Singles	men	women		boys	girls
Doubles	men	women	mixed	boys	girls
- Wimbledon Championships

Ted Schroeder defeated Jaroslav Drobný in the final, 3–6, 6–0, 6–3, 4–6, 6–4 to win the gentlemen's singles tennis title at the 1949 Wimbledon Championships. Bob Falkenburg was the defending champion, but lost in the quarterfinals to John Bromwich.

== Seeds ==
1. (United States) Ted Schroeder (champion)
2. (United States) Pancho Gonzales (fourth round)
3. (United States) Frank Parker (quarterfinals)
4. (Brazil) Bob Falkenburg (quarterfinals)
5. (Australia) John Bromwich (semifinals)
6. (Czechoslovakia) Jaroslav Drobný (final)
7. (South Africa) Eric Sturgess (semifinals)
8. (Australia) Frank Sedgman (quarterfinals)

Click on the seed number of a player to go to their draw section.

== Draw ==
Key

- Q = Qualifier
- WC = Wild card
- LL = Lucky loser
- Alt = Alternate
- ITF = ITF entry
- PR = Protected ranking
- SR = Special ranking
- SE = Special exempt
- JE = Junior exempt
- JR = Junior Accelerator Programme entrant
- CO = College Accelerator Programme entrant
- NG = Next Gen Accelerator Program entrant
- w/o = Walkover
- r = Retired
- d = Defaulted

=== Finals ===
Quarterfinals
(Australia) Geoff Brown	6	5	6	2	4
6	(Czechoslovakia) Jaroslav Drobný	2	7	1	6	6
4	(Brazil) Bob Falkenburg	6	11	0	0	4
5	(Australia) John Bromwich	3	9	6	6	6
7	(South Africa) Eric Sturgess	3	6	3	6	6
3	(United States) Frank Parker	6	4	6	1	3
8	(Australia) Frank Sedgman	6	8	3	2	7
1	(United States) Ted Schroeder	3	6	6	6	9

Semifinals
6	(Czechoslovakia) Jaroslav Drobný	6	6	6
5	(Australia) John Bromwich	1	3	2
7	(South Africa) Eric Sturgess	6	5	7	1	2
1	(United States) Ted Schroeder	3	7	5	6	6

Final
6	(Czechoslovakia) Jaroslav Drobný	6	0	3	6	4
1	(United States) Ted Schroeder	3	6	6	4	6

=== Top half ===
==== Section 1 ====
First round
2	(United States) Pancho Gonzales	6	6	6
(Belgium) Jacques Brichant	3	2	3
(United Kingdom) Tim Lewis	6	3	6	2	5
(France) Christian Grandet	2	6	1	6	7
(United Kingdom) Henry Billington	4	6	6	3	4
(United Kingdom) Norman Kitovitz	6	3	1	6	6
(Norway) Nils-Erik Hessen	4	6	3	4
(Egypt) Marcel Coen	6	0	6	6
Q	(United Kingdom) Francis Wallis	0	3	1
(Australia) Geoff Brown	6	6	6
(Netherlands) FJ Beernink	0	7	4	7	6
(United Kingdom) Arnold England	6	5	6	5	0
(Egypt) Eddie Mandelbaum	1	3	5
(Republic of Ireland) Guy Jackson	6	6	7
(United Kingdom) Roy Mansell	0	2	2
(Philippines) Felicisimo Ampon	6	6	6

Second round
2	(United States) R Gonzales	6	6	6
(France) C Grandet	4	3	4
(United Kingdom) N Kitovitz	1	3	6	6
(Egypt) M Coen	6	6	4	8
(Australia) G Brown	6	6	6
(Netherlands) FJ Beernink	0	2	1
(Republic of Ireland) G Jackson	2	5	1
(Philippines) F Ampon	6	7	6

Third round
2	(United States) R Gonzales	6	6	6
(Egypt) M Coen	1	2	4
(Australia) G Brown	6	6	7
(Philippines) F Ampon	4	2	5

Fourth round
2	(United States) R Gonzales	6	3	2	1
(Australia) G Brown	2	6	6	6

==== Section 2 ====
First round
6	(Czechoslovakia) Jaroslav Drobný	6	6	6
(United Kingdom) Leslie Cater	0	2	2
(Romania) Alexandru Hamburger	6	1	2
(France) Jacques Thomas	8	6	6
(United States) Budge Patty	6	6	6
(United Kingdom) Mirek Kizlink	1	4	3
(United Kingdom) Lawrence Dundas	2	6	6	7
(United Kingdom) Brian Royds	6	4	1	5
(Italy) Marcello del Bello
(Poland) Władysław Skonecki	w/o
(France) Jean Ducos de la Haille	3	1	7	4
(Hungary) András Ádám-Stolpa	6	6	5	6
(Spain) Jaime Bartrolí
(Socialist Federal Republic of Yugoslavia) Petko Milojković	w/o
(South Africa) Nigel Cockburn	6	6	6
LL	(New Zealand) Alan Hunter	1	2	0

Second round
6	(Czechoslovakia) J Drobný	9	6	6
(France) J Thomas	7	2	1
(United States) J Patty	7	6	6
(United Kingdom) L Dundas	5	2	1
(Italy) M del Bello	6	2	6	3	6
(Hungary) A Ádám-Stolpa	4	6	2	6	1
(Spain) J Bartrolí	1	3	2
(South Africa) N Cockburn	6	6	6

Third round
6	(Czechoslovakia) J Drobný	6	6	7	6	6
(United States) J Patty	4	8	9	0	2
(Italy) M del Bello	0	2	3
(South Africa) N Cockburn	6	6	6

Fourth round
6	(Czechoslovakia) J Drobný	6	6	6
(South Africa) N Cockburn	2	3	2

==== Section 3 ====
First round
4	(Brazil) Bob Falkenburg	6	2	8	6
(Socialist Federal Republic of Yugoslavia) Dragutin Mitić	2	6	6	4
(United Kingdom) George Godsell	4	6	9	2	2^{r}
(United Kingdom) Edmund David	6	3	7	6	3
Q	(United Kingdom) Eddie Ford	6	4	2	3
(Czechoslovakia) Milan Matouš	3	6	6	6
(Denmark) Bent Koželuh	2	1	3
(Hungary) József Asbóth	6	6	6
(United Kingdom) Howard Walton	6	5	1	3
(Netherlands) Hans van Swol	4	7	6	6
(Switzerland) Hans Huonder	3	3	6	2
(France) Robert Abdesselam	6	6	3	6
(Austria) Hans Redl	4	3	7	4
(Chile) Ricardo Balbiers	6	6	5	6
(Belgium) Pierre Geelhand de Merxem	6	2	9	7	4
(Norway) Thorgny Haanes	1	6	11	5	6

Second round
4	(Brazil) R Falkenburg	6	6	6
(United Kingdom) E David	3	1	2
(Czechoslovakia) M Matouš	5	1	1
(Hungary) J Asbóth	7	6	6
(Netherlands) A van Swol	3	1	6	7	13
(France) R Abdesselam	6	6	2	5	11
(Chile) R Balbiers	6	6	3	6
(Norway) T Haanes	4	0	6	1

Third round
4	(Brazil) R Falkenburg	6	7	2	0	6
(Hungary) J Asbóth	4	5	6	6	4
(Netherlands) A van Swol	6	1	7	6
(Chile) R Balbiers	3	6	5	4

Fourth round
4	(Brazil) R Falkenburg	7	6	6
(Netherlands) A van Swol	5	0	4

==== Section 4 ====
First round
5	(Australia) John Bromwich	6	6	6
(Republic of Ireland) Jim McArdle	1	1	0
(Czechoslovakia) Jan Krajčík	2	4	6	6	6
(France) Robert Colin	6	6	4	4	3
(United Kingdom) Headley Baxter	8	6	6
Q	(Iran) Matthew Mohtadi	6	3	4
(United States) Earl Cochell	7	5	4	7
(South Africa) Eustace Fannin	5	7	6	9
(United Kingdom) Gerry Oakley	4	9	4
(India) Naresh Kumar	6	11	6
(Egypt) Adli El Shafei	6	6	5	6
(United Kingdom) Derek Bull	4	4	7	4
(Hungary) Dezső Vad	6	6	0	8
(Switzerland) Max Ellmer	2	2	6	6
(Finland) Sakari Salo	3	4	6	1
(Italy) Rolando del Bello	6	6	4	6

Second round
5	(Australia) J Bromwich	6	6	6
(Czechoslovakia) J Krajčík	1	1	1
(United Kingdom) H Baxter	3	4	2
(South Africa) E Fannin	6	6	6
(India) N Kumar	6	1	6	7	6
(Egypt) A El Shafei	3	6	4	9	1
(Hungary) D Vad	0	1	6	4
(Italy) R del Bello	6	6	3	6

Third round
5	(Australia) J Bromwich	6	6	6
(South Africa) E Fannin	1	4	1
(India) N Kumar	4	4	0
(Italy) R del Bello	6	6	6

Fourth round
5	(Australia) J Bromwich	6	6	6
(Italy) R del Bello	1	1	0

=== Bottom half ===
==== Section 5 ====
First round
(Belgium) Jacques Peten	6	6	6
Q	(Hungary) András Kálmán	4	3	1
(United Kingdom) Murray Deloford	15	0	2	6	4
(United Kingdom) Paddy Roberts	13	6	6	4	6
(Italy) Giovanni Cucelli	6	6	6
(Austria) Freddie Huber	3	1	4
(Chile) Marcelo Taverne	1	1	1
(United Kingdom) Tony Mottram	6	6	6
(Socialist Federal Republic of Yugoslavia) Josip Palada	4	10	1	6	6
(United Kingdom) Douglas Snart	6	8	6	0	3
Q	(United States) Jack Morison	6	6	6
(Canada) Colin Maas	2	3	3
(Sweden) Torsten Johansson	4	6	6	6
(Norway) Jan Staubo	6	3	4	1
(Poland) Czesław Spychała	0	2	3
7	(South Africa) Eric Sturgess	6	6	6

Second round
(Belgium) J Peten	6	7	6
(United Kingdom) A Roberts	4	5	4
(Italy) G Cucelli	5	11	8	6
(United Kingdom) A Mottram	7	9	6	2
(Socialist Federal Republic of Yugoslavia) J Palada	6	6	6
Q	(United States) J Morison	4	4	1
(Sweden) T Johansson	6	4	2	6
7	(South Africa) E Sturgess	4	6	6	8

Third round
(Belgium) J Peten	3	0	3
(Italy) G Cucelli	6	6	6
(Socialist Federal Republic of Yugoslavia) J Palada	2	2	4
7	(South Africa) E Sturgess	6	6	6

Fourth round
(Italy) G Cucelli	2	4	1
7	(South Africa) E Sturgess	6	6	6

==== Section 6 ====
First round
(Netherlands) Boebi van Meegeren	0	1	6
(Australia) George Worthington	6	6	8
(France) Bernard Destremau	6	6	3	4	6
(Denmark) Erik Bjerre	2	3	6	6	3
(United Kingdom) Peter Hare	2	6	6	4	0
(Finland) Pentti Forsman	6	4	4	6	6
Q	(South Africa) David Samaai	1	4	3
(Australia) Jack Harper	6	6	6
(India) Subba Sawhney	6	6	6
Q	(South Africa) DV Connor	4	2	3
(Republic of Ireland) Raymond Egan	3	4	6	3
(United States) Phil Hanna	6	6	3	6
(Egypt) Stephen Nimr	1	1	1
(Australia) Bill Sidwell	6	6	6
(Argentina) Heraldo Weiss	0	1	2
3	(United States) Frank Parker	6	6	6

Second round
(Australia) G Worthington	6	6	6
(France) B Destremau	2	0	3
(Finland) P Forsman	6	3	2
(Australia) J Harper	8	6	6
(India) S Sawhney	2	9	2	2
(United States) P Hanna	6	7	6	6
(Australia) W Sidwell	6	4	3	4
3	(United States) F Parker	4	6	6	6

Third round
(Australia) G Worthington	6	5	2	6	6
(Australia) J Harper	2	7	6	0	2
(United States) P Hanna	2	0	4
3	(United States) F Parker	6	6	6

Fourth round
(Australia) G Worthington	2	3	1
3	(United States) F Parker	6	6	6

==== Section 7 ====
First round
(Republic of Ireland) Cyril Kemp	6	6	6
(United Kingdom) Bobby Meredith	2	0	2
(Belgium) Philippe Washer	6	6	6
(New Zealand) Dennis Coombe	3	1	0
Q	(Republic of Ireland) William Manahan	1	1	1
(United Kingdom) Henry Weatherall	6	6	6
(United Kingdom) Claude Lister	6	6	6
(India) Janmeja Charanjiva	4	4	1
(United Kingdom) Don Butler	6	6	7
(Socialist Federal Republic of Yugoslavia) Milan Branović	3	3	5
(Italy) Vanni Canepele	6	6	6
(United Kingdom) Ron Reeve	2	2	2
(Republic of China (1912–1949)) Choy Wai-Chuen	4	2	0
(Socialist Federal Republic of Yugoslavia) Franjo Punčec	6	6	6
Q	(United Kingdom) GB Leyton	1	3	2
8	(Australia) Frank Sedgman	6	6	6

Second round
(Republic of Ireland) C Kemp	2	4	3
(Belgium) P Washer	6	6	6
(United Kingdom) H Weatherall	2	6	4
(United Kingdom) C Lister	6	8	6
(United Kingdom) D Butler	4	4	5
(Italy) G Canepele	6	6	7
(Socialist Federal Republic of Yugoslavia) F Punčec	4	2	0
8	(Australia) F Sedgman	6	6	6

Third round
(Belgium) P Washer	6	6	6
(United Kingdom) C Lister	1	1	2
(Italy) G Canepele	2	2	4
8	(Australia) F Sedgman	6	6	6

Fourth round
(Belgium) P Washer	4	4	5
8	(Australia) F Sedgman	6	6	7

==== Section 8 ====
First round
(United Kingdom) Tony Starte	4	7	0
(United States) Bill Robertson	6	9	6
(Czechoslovakia) Vladimír Černík	8	6	3	1	6
(United Kingdom) Geoffrey Paish	6	2	6	6	2
(France) Paul Rémy	6	6	6
(United Kingdom) Cliff Hovell	1	3	0
(South Africa) Sydney Levy	6	6	6
(Iran) Esmail Sohikish	0	2	0
(United Kingdom) Bill Moss	3	1	1
(United Kingdom) Roland Carter	6	6	6
(Switzerland) René Buser	6	6	6
(Republic of Ireland) Vivian Gotto	2	2	1
Q	(United States) Jim Frolik	2	3	1
(Hungary) Kálmán Fehér	6	6	6
(United States) Gardnar Mulloy	6	11	1	0	5
1	(United States) Ted Schroeder	3	9	6	6	7

Second round
(United States) W Robertson	2	1	3
(Czechoslovakia) V Černík	6	6	6
(France) P Rémy	3	6	6	1	0
(South Africa) S Levy	6	3	4	6	6
(United Kingdom) R Carter	7	1	1	2
(Switzerland) R Buser	5	6	6	6
(Hungary) K Fehér	0	1	4
1	(United States) F Schroeder	6	6	6

Third round
(Czechoslovakia) V Černík	6	3	6	8
(South Africa) S Levy	2	6	4	6
(Switzerland) R Buser	2	3	5
1	(United States) F Schroeder	6	6	7

Fourth round
(Czechoslovakia) V Černík	3	6	6
1	(United States) F Schroeder	6	8	8

Preceded by 1949 French Championships	Grand Slams; Men's Singles	Succeeded by 1949 U.S. Championships
