= Syd Levy =

South African tennis player (1922–2015)

- Full name: Sydney Levy
- Country (sports): South Africa
- Born: 17 October 1922 South Africa
- Died: 22 November 2015 (aged 93) Mount Vernon, New York, U.S.
- College: University of the Witwatersrand

Singles

Grand Slam singles results
- French Open: R2 (1949, 1951)
- Wimbledon: R3 (1949)
- US Open: R2 (1951)

Doubles

Grand Slam doubles results
- Wimbledon: R1 (1949)

Team competitions
- Davis Cup: 1949, 1951
Medal record
Maccabiah Games
Silver medal – second place	1953 Israel	Men's Singles

Sydney Levy (17 October 1922 – 22 November 2015) was a South African tennis player. He competed at Wimbledon, the French Championships, the U.S. Open, and Davis Cup, and won a silver medal at the Maccabiah Games in Israel.

== Biography ==
Levy attended the University of the Witwatersrand in South Africa, and won the university singles title in tennis in 1942.

Levy competed in singles at the 1949 French Championships in Paris. In Round 1 Levy defeated Belgian Pierre Geelhand de Merxem in straight sets, and in Round 2 he lost to Marcel Bernard of France in four sets.

Levy competed in Men Singles Tennis at the 1949 Wimbledon Championships in England. In Round 1 he defeated Esmail Sohikish of Iran, in Round 2 he defeated Paul Rémy of France in five sets, and in Round 3 he was beaten by Vladimír Černík of Czechoslovakia. He also played in Gentlemen's Doubles in the competition, with Nigel Cockburn of South Africa, losing in Round 1 to American Budge Patty and South African Eric Sturgess.

Levy competed at the 1951 U.S. Open in New York City. In Round 1 Levy defeated American Frank Shields in straight sets, and in Round 2 he lost to American Straight Clark in straight sets. He also competed in men's singles in the 1951 Wimbledon Championships, where he was defeated by Jean Claude Molinari of France in five sets.

Levy competed as well in men's singles in the 1951 French Championships. There, in Round 1 he defeated Marcello Del Bello of Italy in straight sets, and in Round 2 he was defeated by Dick Savitt of the United States in five sets.

At both the 1949 Welsh Championships and the 1949 Bristol Open, Levy lost in the finals to Felicisimo Ampon of the Philippines. At both the 1951 and 1952 South African Open, he lost in the finals to Eric Sturgess of South Africa.

Levy played Davis Cup for South Africa in 1951 against the Netherlands and Italy.

Levy was Jewish, and competing at the 1953 Maccabiah Games in Israel, he won a silver medal, losing in the finals to American Grant Golden.

Levy died in Mount Vernon, New York on 22 November 2015, at the age of 93.

== See also ==
- List of South Africa Davis Cup team representatives
