= Esmail Sohikish =

Iranian tennis player

- Country (sports): Iran

Grand Slam singles results
- Wimbledon: 1R (1949)

Esmail Sohikish is a former tennis player from Iran.

== Career ==
Sohikish competed at the 1949 Wimbledon Championships at the Men's Singles where he lost to Syd Levy at the first round.
