= John Horn (tennis) =

British tennis player (1931–2001)

- Country (sports): United Kingdom
- Born: 6 November 1931 Plaistow, London, England
- Died: 26 August 2001 (aged 69) Ireland
- Turned pro: 1951 (amateur tour)
- Retired: 1958

Singles
- Career record: 55–42 (6–7 per ATP)
- Career titles: 24

Grand Slam singles results
- French Open: 2R (1951)
- Wimbledon: 3R (1952)
- US Open: 1R (1950)

Grand Slam doubles results
- Wimbledon: 2R (1952)

Grand Slam mixed doubles results
- Wimbledon: 3R (1952, 1953)

John Alfred Thomas Horn (6 November 1931 – 26 August 2001) was a British tennis player, and he won the Wimbledon Boys' singles Championship in 1950.

== Tennis career ==
Horn reached the Wimbledon Boys' Singles final for two years running. In the 1949 final, he lost to Staffan Stockenberg; and in 1950, he beat the Egyptian player, Kamel Moubarek in the final.

Horn competed on the amateur circuit during the 1950s and won 23 titles. His first title was as an eighteen-year-old, at the Derbyshire championships in Buxton, when he beat George Godsell in the final. His last amateur title was in 1956 at the North of England Hardcourts, beating Michael Hann in the final. Horn turned professional in the late 1950s and in 1967 he won the British Pro Championships held at Eastbourne with a victory over Charles Applewhaite.

Horn's best result at a Grand Slam events was reaching the third round at the 1952 Wimbledon Championships, before losing to Budge Patty. After retiring as a player, Horn worked as a tennis coach in Ireland, spending many years coaching at Rathdown School.

== Junior Grand Slam finals ==
=== Singles: 2 (1 win – 1 loss) ===
Result	Year	Championship	Surface	Opponent	Score
Loss	1949	Wimbledon	Grass	(Sweden) Staffan Stockenberg	2–6, 1–6
Win	1950	Wimbledon	Grass	(Egypt) Kamel Moubarek	6–0, 6–2
