= Ricardo Balbiers =

Chilean tennis player

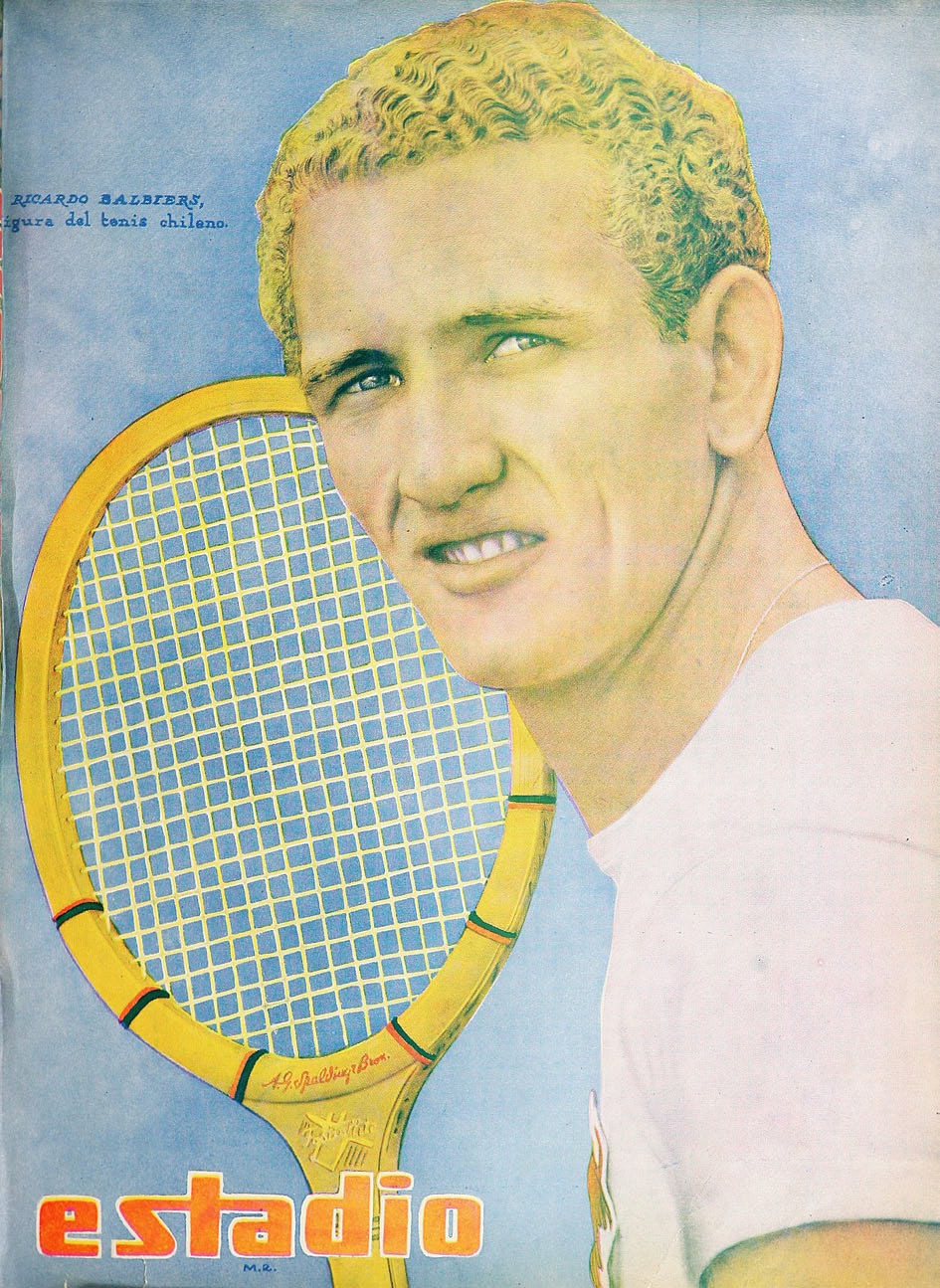
- Country (sports): Chile
- Height: 6 ft 3 in (191 cm)

Singles
- Career record: 104–75
- Career titles: 8

Grand Slam singles results
- French Open: 4R (1949)
- Wimbledon: 3R (1949, 1952)
- US Open: 3R (1947)

Ricardo Balbiers is a former tennis player active in the 1940s and 1950s.

Balbiers played soccer in his youth and didn't pick up tennis until the age of 13, when his sister needed someone to compete against. In 1947 he came to the United States as the reigning Chilean national champion and joined the collegiate team at Rollins College. He was runner-up to Herbert Flam for the 1950 NCAA singles title.

On tour, Balbiers twice reached the singles third round of the Wimbledon Championships. He was seeded 16th for the 1949 French Championships and made it through to the round of 16, losing to the champion that year Frank Parker.

Balbiers won the 1950 Florida State Championships on clay, defeating Tony Vincent in the final in three straight sets.

Balbiers played Davis Cup for Chile in 1949, 1952 and 1954, winning seven singles and two doubles rubbers.

Two daughters, Alina and Jeannine, both played professional tennis. Elder daughter Alina competed for Mexico in the Federation Cup and married tennis player Luis Baraldi. Jeannine is better known for her collegiate career with Arizona State and married Paul Sullivan, who was also a tennis player.

== See also ==
- List of Chile Davis Cup team representatives
