= Marcello del Bello =

Italian tennis player (1921–1988)

Marcello Del Bello
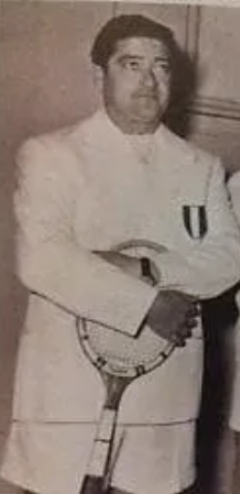
- Full name: Marcello Del Bello
- Country (sports): Italy
- Born: 25 January 1921 Rome, Italy
- Died: 12 March 1988 (aged 67) Pioltello, Italy
- Turned pro: 1955 (amateur tour from 1938)
- Retired: 1962

Grand Slam singles results
- French Open: QF (1948)
- Wimbledon: 3R (1949)
- US Open: 2R (1949)

Other tournaments
- Professional majors
- French Pro: Last 16 (1956)

Grand Slam doubles results
- Wimbledon: QF (1948, 1949, 1951, 1952)

Marcello del Bello (25 January 1921 – 12 March 1988) was an Italian tennis player. He played Davis Cup and often played doubles with Giovanni Cucelli. Del Bello and his younger brother Rolando were introduced to the game at a young age, as their father worked at a tennis club. Both became tour players. Marcello made his Grand Slam debut at Wimbledon in 1947, losing in round one to Enrique Morea. At Roland Garros (held after Wimbledon for the last time), Del Bello lost in round three to Philippe Washer. At Roland Garros in 1948, Del Bello reached the quarter finals, where he lost to Budge Patty. At Wimbledon he lost to Frank Sedgman in round two. At Wimbledon 1949, Del Bello lost in round three to Nigel Cockburn. At the U.S. Championships, he lost in the second round to James Brink. At Roland Garros in 1950, Del Bello lost in round three to Ken McGregor.

By 1951 Del Bello's career was beginning to decline and he lost in round one of the French to South African Syd Levy in straight sets, and Wimbledon. The following year he lost in round two at the French and Wimbledon. At Roland Garros in 1953, Del Bello lost in round one to Ian Ayre. In 1955, Del Bello turned professional.
