= Pablo Eisenberg =

American scholar and reformer (1932–2022)

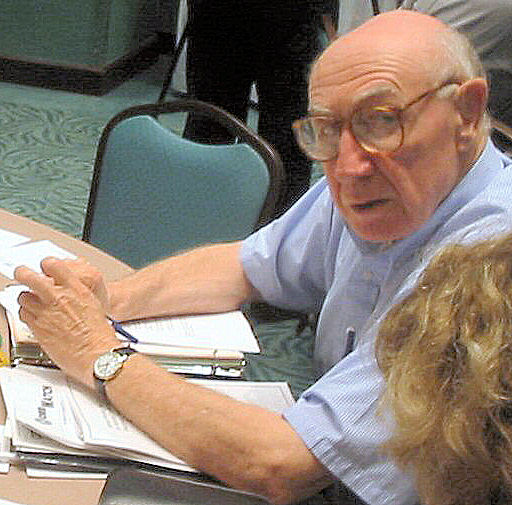
- Born: July 1, 1932; Paris, France
- Died: October 18, 2022 (aged 90); Rockville, Maryland, U.S.
- Education: Princeton University (BA); Merton College, Oxford (B.Litt)

Pablo Samuel Eisenberg (July 1, 1932 – October 18, 2022) was an American scholar, social justice advocate, and tennis player. He played in Wimbledon five times, making the quarterfinals once, and won a gold medal at the 1953 Maccabiah Games in Israel. He was a Senior Fellow at Georgetown University's Public Policy Institute. Prior to his role at Georgetown, he served for 23 years as executive director of the Center for Community Change, a progressive community organizing group.

== Early life ==
Eisenberg was born in Paris, France, on July 1, 1932, to a Jewish family. He came to the United States in 1939, when he was seven years old, and grew up in New Jersey. He was the godson of cellist Pablo Casals.

Eisenberg lived in Millburn, New Jersey, and attended Millburn High School, where he played tennis and basketball. He was later inducted into the Millburn High School Athletic Hall of Fame in 2016.

Eisenberg was a graduate of Princeton University and Merton College, Oxford, where he earned a BA and a B.Litt, respectively. He received a German Marshall Fund fellowship in 1989 to study the nonprofit sectors in Great Britain, the Netherlands, and France. He was a nationally ranked tennis player and was captain of both the Princeton and Oxford tennis teams.

== Career ==
After serving two years in the U.S. Army, Eisenberg spent three years in Africa as a foreign service officer with the U.S. Information Agency. He then served as program director of Operation Crossroads Africa for two years, before going to work as director of Pennsylvania Operations for the Office of Economic Opportunity (OEO) in Washington, D.C. He subsequently became deputy director of the Research and Demonstration division at the Office of Economic Opportunity. After leaving OEO, he served as deputy director for field operations at the National Urban Coalition. After almost five years with the Coalition, he worked as a freelance consultant for a variety of nonprofit organizations and foundations.

Eisenberg was a visiting professor at both the University of Notre Dame and New Orleans University. He was also a senior fellow at Georgetown University's Public Policy Institute. Prior to his role at Georgetown, Eisenberg served for 23 years as executive director of the Center for Community Change, a progressive community organizing group.

Eisenberg published articles and chapters of books and was a regular columnist for The Chronicle of Philanthropy. His book, Challenges for Nonprofits and Philanthropy: The Courage to Change, was published by the New England Press and Tufts University in December 2004. In 2003 he wrote, with Christine Ahn and Channapha Khamsvongsa, the report, Foundation Trustee Fees: Use and Abuse (Washington, D.C.: Georgetown Public Policy Institute, Center for Public and Nonprofit Leadership, September 2003).

Eisenberg was a founder of the National Committee for Responsive Philanthropy and was president of Friends of VISTA. He served on the boards of Youth Today, Eureka Communities, the Milton Eisenhower Foundation, ICChange and the University College of Citizenship and Public Service at Tufts University, and New Faculty Majority Foundation, and was a trustee of Citizen Funds.

Eisenberg was the recipient of the 1989 award for Outstanding Achievement in Public Service from the Alliance for Justice; the Weston Howland Jr. Award for Distinguished National Leadership from Tufts University; a Lifetime Achievement Award in 1997 by the National Society of Fundraising Executives; and the 1998 John Gardner Leadership Award sponsored by Independent Sector. In June 2004, he received an honorary Doctor of Laws degree from Princeton University.

== Tennis career ==
In 1954, Eisenberg was ranked ninth in the United States in doubles. He played in Wimbledon five times, making the quarterfinals in doubles alongside John "Buddy" Ager in 1955. He played in the US Championships six times.

During the 1953 Maccabiah Games, Eisenberg played men's doubles with Grant Golden, winning the gold medal, and men's singles where he was defeated in five sets in the semi-finals by South African Davis Cup player Syd Levy.

== Personal life ==
Eisenberg was married to Helen Cierniak for 62 years until her death in 2022. Together, they had one daughter.

Eisenberg died at a nursing home in Rockville, Maryland, on October 18, 2022, at age 90.
