= José Agüero (Brazilian tennis player) =

Brazilian tennis player (born 1933)

- Country (sports): Brazil
- Born: 27 February 1933

Grand Slam singles results
- French Open: 1R (1952)
- Wimbledon: 1R (1952)
- US Open: 2R (1955)

José Agüero (born 27 February 1933), also known as Pepe Agüero, is a Brazilian former tennis player.

A native of Rio de Janeiro, Agüero is the son of a Chilean tennis instructor and was originally a swimmer, before switching to tennis as a teenager. His game was built on stamina and he was a good retriever of the ball.

Agüero played collegiate tennis for Tulane University and won the 1955 NCAA singles championship, defeating Bill Quillian in the final. He won four Southeastern Conference singles titles in singles and a further four in doubles.

From 1955 to 1957 he played for the Brazil Davis Cup team.

== See also ==
- List of Brazil Davis Cup team representatives
