= 1949 Wimbledon Championships – Girls' singles =

Girls' singles
- 1949 Wimbledon Championships

Final
- Champion: (Belgium) Christiane Mercelis
- Runner-up: (United Kingdom) Susan Partridge
- Score: 6–4, 6–2

Details
- Draw: 7

Events
| Singles | men | women | | boys | girls |
| Doubles | men | women | mixed | boys | girls |
- Wimbledon Championships

Christiane Mercelis defeated Susan Partridge in the final, 6–4, 6–2 to win the girls' singles tennis title at the 1949 Wimbledon Championships.

== Draw ==
Key

- Q = Qualifier
- WC = Wild card
- LL = Lucky loser
- Alt = Alternate
- ITF = ITF entry
- PR = Protected ranking
- SR = Special ranking
- SE = Special exempt
- JE = Junior exempt
- JR = Junior Accelerator Programme entrant
- CO = College Accelerator Programme entrant
- NG = Next Gen Accelerator Program entrant
- w/o = Walkover
- r = Retired
- d = Defaulted

=== Draw ===
Quarterfinals
(Greece) M Akrivou | 4 | 4
(United Kingdom) Susan Partridge | 6 | 6
(Republic of Ireland) Heather Cole | 2 | 6 | 6
(Netherlands) A Schraagen | 6 | 4 | 0
(Belgium) Christiane Mercelis | 6 | 6
(Denmark) L Lutichau | 1 | 2

Semifinals
(United Kingdom) Susan Partridge | 6 | 6
(Republic of Ireland) Heather Cole | 3 | 3
(Belgium) Christiane Mercelis | 6 | 6
(Sweden) AM Garell | 2 | 2

Final
(United Kingdom) Susan Partridge | 4 | 2
(Belgium) Christiane Mercelis | 6 | 6
