= 1949 Wimbledon Championships – Boys' singles =

Boys' singles
- 1949 Wimbledon Championships

Final
- Champion: (Sweden) Staffan Stockenberg
- Runner-up: (United Kingdom) John Horn
- Score: 6–2, 6–1

Events
Singles	men	women		boys	girls
Doubles	men	women	mixed	boys	girls
← 1948 ·	Wimbledon Championships	· 1950 →

Staffan Stockenberg defeated John Horn in the final, 6–2, 6–1 to win the boys' singles tennis title at the 1949 Wimbledon Championships.

== Draw ==
=== Key ===
- Q = Qualifier
- WC = Wild card
- LL = Lucky loser
- Alt = Alternate
- SE = Special exempt
- PR = Protected ranking
- ITF = ITF entry
- JE = Junior exempt
- w/o = Walkover
- r = Retired
- d = Defaulted
- SR = Special ranking

=== Finals ===
Semifinals
(France) Robert Haillet	3	5
(United Kingdom) John Horn	6	7
(Republic of Ireland) Gerry Fitzpatrick	3	4
(Sweden) Staffan Stockenberg	6	6

Final
(United Kingdom) John Horn	2	1
(Sweden) Staffan Stockenberg	6	6

=== Top half ===
First round
(Norway) Finn Søhol
(Socialist Federal Republic of Yugoslavia) Ilija Panajotović

Second round
(Austria) K Diglas	4	1
(India) IDN Taylor	6	6
(Hungary) Antal Jancsó	2	2
(France) Robert Haillet	6	6
(Netherlands) Hendrik Goris	2	0
(United Kingdom) John Horn	6	6
(Denmark) J Larsen	1	6	1
(Norway) F Søhol	6	4	6

Quarterfinals
(India) IDN Taylor	2	0
(France) R Haillet	6	6
(United Kingdom) John Horn	8	7	6
(Norway) F Søhol	10	5	2

Semifinals
(France) R Haillet	3	5
(United Kingdom) John Horn	6	7

=== Bottom half ===
First round
(Poland) Jan Radzio	6	3	3
(Republic of Ireland) Gerry Fitzpatrick	2	6	6

Second round
(Republic of Ireland) G Fitzpatrick	6	4	6
(Belgium) André Jamar	2	6	1
(Austria) Fritz Jonak	4	6	6
(Socialist Federal Republic of Yugoslavia) Sima Nikolić	6	2	1
(Poland) R Kudlinski	0	0
(Sweden) Staffan Stockenberg	6	6
(France) Alain Lemyze	6	6
(Hungary) L Vadinsky	1	0

Quarterfinals
(Republic of Ireland) G Fitzpatrick	7	6
(Austria) F Jonak	6	2
(Sweden) S Stockenberg	12	6
(France) A Lemyze	10	4

Semifinals
(Republic of Ireland) G Fitzpatrick	3	4
(Sweden) S Stockenberg	6	6
