= Anita Kanter =

American tennis player

- Born: 1933 (age 91–92); Santa Monica, California
- College: University of California-Los Angeles

Anita Kanter
Medal record

Representing United States

Maccabiah Games

Women's tennis
Silver medal – second place	1953 Israel	Women's Singles
Gold medal – first place	1953 Israel	Mixed Doubles
Gold medal – first place	1953 Israel	Women's Doubles

Anita Kanter (born 1933) is a former amateur tennis player from the U.S. who played in the 1950s. In singles, Kanter was ranked # 6 in the United States (and # 10 in the world by World Tennis magazine) in 1952, and # 9 in the US in 1953.

== Early life ==
Kanter was born in Santa Monica, California, and is Jewish. She attended Santa Monica High School.

== Tennis career ==
Kanter won the 1949 US Girls National Hard Court Singles Championship. She won the US girls tennis championship in 1951 as an 18-year-old sophomore at the University of California-Los Angeles, as well as the 1951 National Hard Court Doubles and Mixed Doubles championships.

In 1952, she won the U.S. Women's Clay Court Championships, and was the runner-up at the Foothills Cup. That year at the Cincinnati Masters, she won both the singles and doubles titles.

In 1953 she won the US National hard court tennis championship, successfully defended her doubles title, and reached the singles final. She was seeded no. 1 in singles and doubles in both appearances in Cincinnati. In doubles in those two years, she paired with Joan Merciadis in 1952 and with Thelma Long of Australia in 1953.

=== Maccabiah Games ===
Kanter, who is Jewish, competed in Israel in the 1953 Maccabiah Games—the "Jewish Olympics". At the Games, Kanter, ranked #9 in the US at the time, lost the women's singles title to Angela Buxton and ended up with the silver medal, but won two gold medals, one as she won the mixed doubles title with Grant Golden and one as she won the women's double title with Toby Greenberg - beating Angela Buxton and Carol Levy of Britain in the final.

== Hall of Fame ==
In 2014, she was inducted into the Southern California Jewish Sports Hall of Fame.

== See also ==
- List of select Jewish tennis players
