= 1953 Maccabiah Games =

International Jewish multi-sport event

4th Maccabiah
- Host city: Tel Aviv, Israel
- Nations: 23
- Debuting countries: Brazil; Chile; Rhodesia
- Athletes: 890
- Events: 18 branches of sports
- Opening: September 20, 1953
- Closing: September 29, 1953
- Opened by: Israeli President Itzhak Ben-Zvi
- Main venue: Ramat Gan Stadium

Eight hundred ninety athletes representing 23 countries competed in the 1953 4th Maccabiah Games, held September 20 to 29, in 18 branches of sports.

Israeli President Itzhak Ben-Zvi opened the Games at Ramat Gan Stadium in Tel Aviv District, in front of a crowd of 50,000. American Olympic wrestling champion Henry Wittenburg carried the US flag for Team USA. At the closing ceremony Prime Minister David Ben Gurion addressed the collected athletes, saying: "Come back to us for the next Maccabiah, and bring along representatives of Romania, Hungary, and Russia," as a crowd of 50,000 cheered.

== History ==
The Maccabiah Games were first held in 1932.

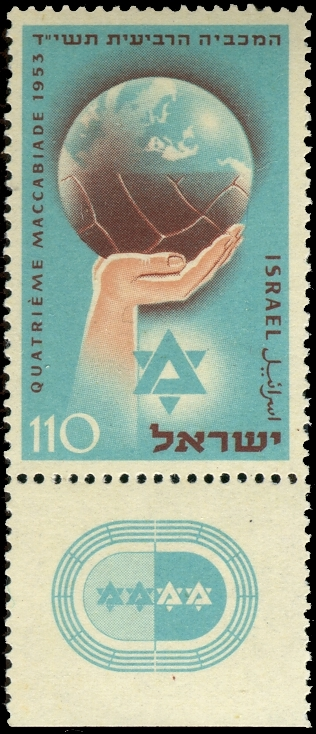
Israeli postal stamp

== Notable medalists ==
Ben Helfgott, a concentration camp survivor and later an Olympian, won the weightlifting gold medal in the lightweight class for Great Britain for the second Games in a row.

In gymnastics, Olympian Abie Grossfeld of the United States won six gold medals.

In tennis, U.S. champion Anita Kanter won gold medals for the U.S. in women's doubles with partner Toby Greenberg of the US, and mixed doubles with Grant Golden, and the silver medal in women's singles. Toby Greenberg also won the silver medal in mixed doubles with partner Pablo Eisenberg. Angela Buxton of Great Britain, who three years later was to win the doubles title at Wimbledon, won the gold medal in women's singles, defeating Kanter in the final. On the men's side, Grant Golden, who was ranked # 2 in the US that year, captured three gold medals in the men's singles (over South African Davis Cup player Syd Levy), the men's doubles with partner Pablo Eisenberg, and the mixed doubles with Kanter. Eleazar Davidman competed in men's singles in tennis for Israel.

In boxing, Abraham Rosenberg, a concentration camp survivor, won the heavyweight division gold medal. Rozenberg fighting for France lived to that time in Germany, but Germany didn't have a team in that Maccabiah, so Rozenberg fought for France. American Olympic champion Henry Wittenberg won a gold medal in wrestling. Olympian León Genuth of Argentina won the middleweight wrestling championship for the second Games in a row. Fred Oberlander of Canada, former world champion and Olympian, won the Greco-Roman wrestling heavyweight gold medal.

In fencing, 3-time Pan American Games gold medalist Allan Kwartler of the US won a gold medal in foil. British Olympian and world champion Allan Jay won three gold medals, in foil and epee (in the epee final, he defeated America's Ralph Goldstein). Ralph Cooperman was a medalist for Great Britain in fencing. Canadian David Silverstone won a bronze medal in epee.

Harry Kane of Britain, a future Olympian, won the 400 meter with a games record time of 50.5. World record holder Henry Laskau of the United States won a gold medal in race walking. American Olympic discus thrower Vic Frank competed. American Olympian and world record holder in the hammer throw Marty Engel won a gold medal in the hammer throw and a bronze medal in the shot put. Israeli Olympian Arieh Batun-Kleinstub (Naveh) won the gold medal in the high jump.

The US basketball team won a gold medal, with future NBA player Boris Nachamkin and Ed Weiner playing, and coached by Tubby Raskin of Brooklyn College. Israel won the silver medal, with Olympian Abraham Shneior playing on the team.

In swimming, future Olympian Shoshana Ribner of Israel won the gold medal in the 400 m crawl, defeating Olympian Zsuzsa Nádor of Great Britain. American Bernie Kahn won a gold medal in the 100 m backstroke. Israeli Olympian Yoav Raanan won a gold medal in high diving, as two-time Olympian Peter J. Elliott of Great Britain won the bronze medal.

It was decided to change the duration after this Maccabiah to once every four years, to gain Olympic recognition.

== Participating communities ==
First-time entries included Brazil, Chile, and Zimbabwe (Rhodesia). The number in parentheses indicates the number of participants that community contributed, with 23 countries fielding delegations.

- Argentina
- Austria
- Australia
- Belgium
- Brazil
- Canada (20)
- Chile
- Denmark
- Finland
- France
- West Germany
- India
- Ireland
- Israel (279)
- Italy
- Mexico
- Netherlands
- Rhodesia
- South Africa
- Switzerland
- Turkey
- United Kingdom
- United States (120)
