= Giovanni Cucelli =

Italian tennis player

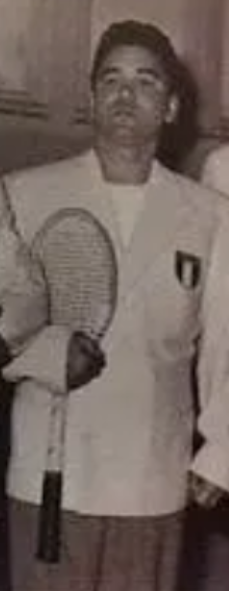
- Full name: Giovanni "Gianni" Cucelli
- Country (sports): Italy
- Born: 13 November 1916 Fiume, Austria-Hungary
- Died: 29 April 1977 (aged 60) Milan, Italy
- Turned pro: 1955 (amateur tour from 1939)
- Retired: 1958

Singles

Grand Slam singles results
- French Open: QF (1947, 1948, 1949)
- Wimbledon: 4R (1949)
- US Open: 2R (1949)
- Professional majors
- French Pro: QF (1956)

Doubles

Grand Slam doubles results
- Wimbledon: QF (1948)

Giovanni Cucelli (born as Giovanni Kucel) (13 November 1916 – 29 April 1977) was an Italian tennis player.

Cucelli played Davis Cup for Italy and formed a great doubles partnership with Marcello Del Bello. Because of World War 2, Cucelli was 30 by the time he made his Grand Slam debut at Wimbledon in 1947, where he lost in the third round to Jack Kramer. At Roland Garros (held just after Wimbledon) Cucelli beat veteran Jack Crawford and Robert Abdesselam before losing to defending champion Marcel Bernard in five sets in the quarter-finals. At Roland Garros in 1948, Cucelli beat a young Frank Sedgman before losing to Frank Parker in the quarter finals. At Wimbledon Cucelli beat Jaroslav Drobny before losing to Tony Mottram in round three. At Roland Garros in 1949, Cucelli reached his third consecutive quarter-final, where he lost to Budge Patty. At Wimbledon he beat Mottram before losing to Eric Sturgess in the last 16. At 1949 U.S. Championships, Cucelli lost in the second round to Sam Match. Cucelli lost in the last 16 of Roland Garros in 1950 to Patty. After early exits at the French and Wimbledon in 1951, Cucelli reached the last 16 at Roland Garros in 1952, where he lost to Ken McGregor. He lost early at Wimbledon to Mottram. Cucelli lost his first match at Roland Garros in 1953 to Rex Hartwig. In 1955 Cucelli turned professional. Cucelli won a lot of tournaments during his career: Italian Riviera championships and Alassio in 1939, Napoli and Barcelona Christmas tournament in 1941, St. Moritz, French-Switzerland championships and Milan international in 1946, Swiss championships, Villars, Montana-Vermala, Viareggio and Rapallo in 1947, Milan international, Napoli, Rapallo, Montecatini and Barcelona Christmas tournament in 1948, San Remo in 1949, Lugano, Istanbul, Venice and Lugano Lido tournament in 1950, San Pellegrino and Viareggio in 1951 and Cava De Tirreni in 1952. He was runner-up at Monte Carlo in 1948 to Jozsef Asboth and 1949 to Parker and runner-up at Rome in 1951 (where he beat Patty before losing to Drobny).
