= Grant Golden (tennis) =

American tennis player

- Full name: Grant Golden
- Country (sports): United States
- Born: August 21, 1929 Chicago, Illinois
- Died: December 15, 2018 (aged 89) Glenview, Illinois
- Height: 5 ft 9 in (1.75 m)
- Plays: Right-handed

Singles
- Career record: 209-103
- Career titles: 17

Grand Slam singles results
- French Open: 2R (1952)
- Wimbledon: 4R (1952)
- US Open: 4R (1956, 1958)

Doubles

Grand Slam doubles results
- Wimbledon: 2R (1952, 1953)

Mixed doubles

Grand Slam mixed doubles results
- Wimbledon: 2R (1952)

Team competitions
- Davis Cup: F (1957^{Ch})

Grant Golden
Medal record

Representing United States

Maccabiah Games

Men's tennis
Gold medal – first place	1953 Israel	Men's Singles
Gold medal – first place	1953 Israel	Men's Doubles
Gold medal – first place	1953 Israel	Mixed Doubles

Grant Golden (August 21, 1929 – December 15, 2018 in Chicago, Illinois) was an American amateur tennis player in the 1940s and 1950s. Golden was ranked in the U.S. top 10 in singles in 1953, 1956, and 1957, and was ranked # 2 in the U.S. in doubles in 1953.

== Early and personal life ==
Golden, the son of Sophie and Abe Golden, was Jewish. His wife was Karyl (nee Gesmer) Golden.

He was awarded the Commendation Ribbon with Metal Pendant for Meritorious Service, Far East Command, U.S. Army.

== Tennis career ==
Golden played collegiate tennis from 1948 to 1951 at Northwestern University, where he was Big Ten Conference singles and doubles champion in 1950, and named an All American. He earned his doubles title with Bill Landin. He won the Illinois State Championships singles title 13 times, and the Western Indoor Singles Championship 10 consecutive times.

Golden won the United States National Indoor Doubles championship in 1957 and 1958, and the United States National Clay Court Doubles championship in 1952, 1953, and 1959.

At the Tri-State Championships, Golden won three consecutive doubles titles: in 1956 (with Bernard Bartzen), in 1957 (with Bill Quillian), and in 1958 (with Bartzen). He also reached the doubles final in 1951 (with Hugh Stewart) and in 1959 (with Whitney Reed).

In singles in Cincinnati, he was a finalist in 1957 (losing to Bartzen); a semifinalist in 1951 (losing to Tony Trabert), 1952, and 1956; and a quarterfinalist in 1949. He also reached the round of 16 in 1950 (losing 8–10 in the final set to Ham Richardson), and in 1958.

== Davis Cup ==
Golden was 2–1 in Davis Cup play in 1957.

== Maccabiah Games ==
Golden, who was Jewish, competed in the 1953 Maccabiah Games in Israel, winning gold medals in men's singles (over South African Davis Cup player Syd Levy), men's doubles with partner Pablo Eisenberg, and mixed doubles with partner Anita Kanter.

== Halls of Fame ==
Golden was inducted into the Northwestern University Athletic Hall of Fame in 1998.

Grant was also inducted into the USTA Midwest Section Hall of Fame.

He was inducted in 2014 into the Chicago Tennis Hall of Fame.

== See also ==
- List of select Jewish tennis players
