= Staffan Stockenberg =

Swedish tennis player (1931–2019)

- Country (sports): Sweden
- Born: 14 September 1931; Sundbyberg, Sweden
- Died: 20 May 2019 (aged 87)
- Turned pro: 1948 (amateur tour)
- Retired: 1962
- Plays: Right-handed

Singles
- Career record: 72–98 (42%)
- Career titles: 2

Grand Slam singles results
- French Open: 3R (1953)
- Wimbledon: 3R (1951, 1952, 1953, 1954, 1955, 1956)

Doubles

Grand Slam doubles results
- Wimbledon: QF (1953)

Mixed doubles

Grand Slam mixed doubles results
- Wimbledon: 2R (1951, 1954, 1960)

Staffan Oscar Stockenberg (14 September 1931 – 20 May 2019) was a Swedish tennis player.

== Tennis career ==
As a junior, Stockenberg achieved significant successes and won two consecutive junior singles titles at the Wimbledon Championships, in 1948 and 1949. He also won the Swedish Junior Championship title five times from 1945 to 1949.

Stockenberg's first tournament victory was at the North of England Hardcourts event in Scarborough when he beat the Polish player Czeslaw Spychala 6–4, 6–4 in the final.

Stockenberg represented Sweden on two occasions in the Davis Cup. In 1953, he together with Lennart Bergelin and Sven Davidson met Italy in the European quarterfinal tie and in 1955, Torsten Johansson joined the Swedish team for European final in Milan, once again against Italy. Stockenberg played one match in each of these ties and lost both, in 1953 against Giuseppe Merlo and in 1955 against Fausto Gardini.

== Junior Grand Slam titles ==
=== Singles: 2 (2 titles) ===
| Result | Year | Championship | Surface | Opponent | Score |
|---|---|---|---|---|---|
| Win | 1948 | Wimbledon | Grass | (Hungary) Dezső Vad | 6–0, 6–8, 5–7, 6–4, 6–2 |
| Win | 1949 | Wimbledon | Grass | (United Kingdom) John Horn | 6–2, 6–1 |

== See also ==
- List of Sweden Davis Cup team representatives
