= Jacques Thomas =

French tennis player (1922–1987)

- Full name: Jacques Lucien Félix Thomas
- Country (sports): France
- Born: 13 April 1922
- Died: 27 October 1987 (aged 65)
- Plays: Left-handed

Singles

Grand Slam singles results
- French Open: 4R (1949)
- Wimbledon: 2R (1949)

Jacques Lucien Félix Thomas (13 April 1922 — 27 October 1987) was a French tennis player.

A left-handed player, Thomas was associated with the Tennis Club de Paris. His best performance at Roland Garros was a fourth round appearance in the 1949 French Championships, where he had been seeded 13th. He played Davis Cup for France in 1949 and 1950. In 1952 he made the doubles final in Monte Carlo.

== See also ==
- List of France Davis Cup team representatives
