= 1949 Wimbledon Championships =

- Date: 20 June – 2 July
- Edition: 63rd
- Category: Grand Slam
- Surface: Grass
- Location: Church Road; SW19, Wimbledon, London, United Kingdom
- Venue: All England Lawn Tennis and Croquet Club
- Attendance: 253,410

Champions

Men's singles
- (United States) Ted Schroeder

Women's singles
- (United States) Louise Brough

Men's doubles
- (United States) Pancho Gonzales / (United States) Frank Parker

Women's doubles
- (United States) Louise Brough / (United States) Margaret duPont

Mixed doubles
- (South Africa) Eric Sturgess / (South Africa) Sheila Summers

Boys' singles
- (Sweden) Staffan Stockenberg

Girls' singles
- (Belgium) Christiane Mercelis
- Wimbledon Championships

The 1949 Wimbledon Championships took place on the outdoor grass courts at the All England Lawn Tennis and Croquet Club in Wimbledon, London, United Kingdom. The tournament was held from Monday 20 June until Saturday 2 July. It was the 63rd staging of the Wimbledon Championships, and the third Grand Slam of Year. Ted Schroeder and Louise Brough won the singles titles.

A record 25,000 spectators attended the opening day of the championships. Centre Court was fully restored and renovated for the championships in 1949, having suffered bomb damage during The Blitz in the Second World War. Women officiated as lines judges on Centre Court for the first time in 1949. The Men's Singles champion received the winners' trophy on Centre Court for the first time.

== Finals ==
=== Seniors ===
==== Men's singles ====
(United States) Ted Schroeder defeated (Czechoslovakia) Jaroslav Drobný, 3–6, 6–0, 6–3, 4–6, 6–4

==== Women's singles ====
(United States) Louise Brough defeated (United States) Margaret duPont, 10–8, 1–6, 10–8

==== Men's doubles ====
(United States) Pancho Gonzales / (United States) Frank Parker defeated (United States) Gardnar Mulloy / (United States) Ted Schroeder, 6–4, 6–4, 6–2

==== Women's doubles ====
(United States) Louise Brough / (United States) Margaret duPont defeated (United States) Gussie Moran / (United States) Pat Todd, 8–6, 7–5

==== Mixed doubles ====
(South Africa) Eric Sturgess / (South Africa) Sheila Summers defeated (Australia) John Bromwich / (United States) Louise Brough, 9–7, 9–11, 7–5

=== Juniors ===
==== Boys' singles ====
(Sweden) Staffan Stockenberg defeated (United Kingdom) John Horn, 6–2, 6–1

==== Girls' singles ====
(Belgium) Christiane Mercelis defeated (United Kingdom) Susan Partridge, 6–4, 6–2

Preceded by 1949 French Championships	Grand Slams	Succeeded by 1949 U.S. National Championships
