= Eugenio Saller =

Brazilian tennis player

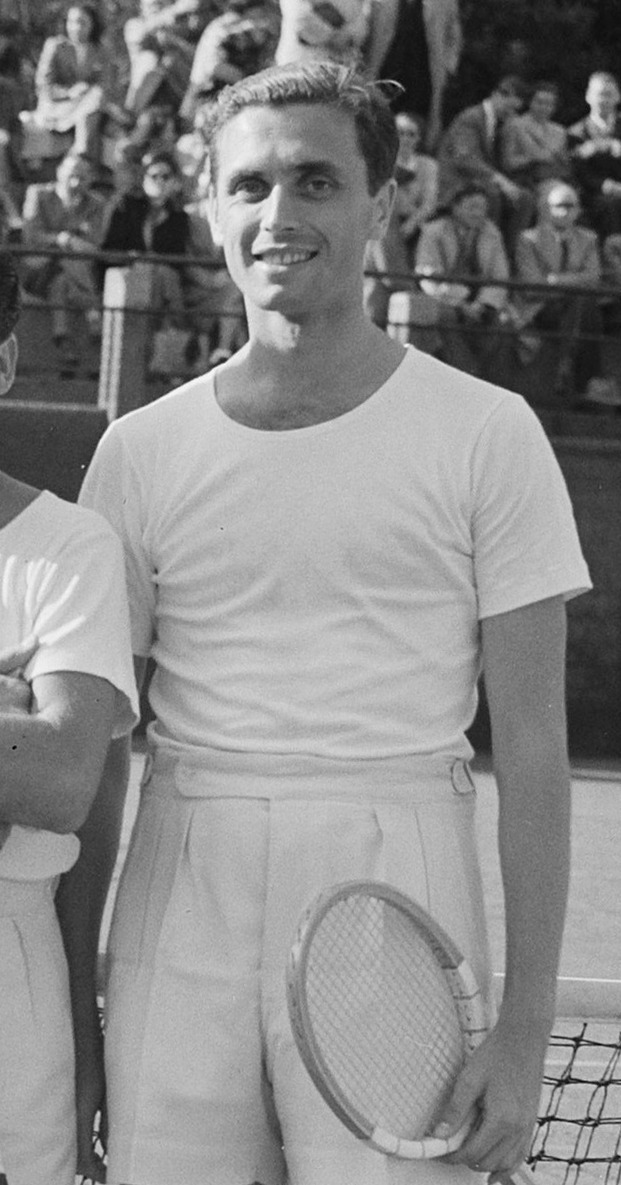
- Eugenio Saller in 1952
- Country (sports): Brazil
- Born: 5 June 1928
- Died: April 2017

Singles
- Career titles: 0 WTA, 0 ITF

Grand Slam singles results
- Wimbledon: 1R (1952)

Doubles
- Career titles: 0 WTA, 0 ITF

Eugenio Saller (5 June 1928 – April 2017) was a Brazilian tennis player. He competed at Wimbledon and French Open in 1952, and later was the president of the Brazilian Tennis Federation, as well as representative in the International Tennis Federation (ITF). Born in Zlin, Czech Republic, Saller graduated from the University of Texas with a scholarship. Following his tennis career, Eugenio became a reference in the Brazilian coffee industry as CEO of Melitta Brazil. During his tenure, Melitta became one of the main sponsors backing brazilian tennis players and tournaments in the Latin American region.
