= 1949 French Championships (tennis) =

- Date: 18–29 May 1949
- Edition: 48
- Category: 19th Grand Slam (ITF)
- Surface: Clay
- Location: Paris (XVI^{e}), France
- Venue: Stade Roland Garros

Champions

Men's singles
- (United States) Frank Parker

Women's singles
- (United States) Margaret Osborne duPont

Men's doubles
- (United States) Pancho Gonzales / (United States) Frank Parker

Women's doubles
- (United States) Margaret Du Pont / (United States) Louise Brough

Mixed doubles
- (South Africa) Sheila Piercey Summers / (South Africa) Eric Sturgess
← 1948 ·	French Championships	· 1950 →

The 1949 French Championships (now known as the French Open) was a tennis tournament that took place on the outdoor clay courts at the Stade Roland-Garros in Paris, France. The tournament ran from 18 May until 29 May. It was the 53rd staging of the French Championships, and the second Grand Slam tennis event of 1949. Frank Parker and Margaret Osborne duPont won the singles titles.

== Finals ==
=== Men's singles ===
(United States) Frank Parker defeated (United States) Budge Patty 6–3, 1–6, 6–1, 6–4

=== Women's singles ===
(United States) Margaret Osborne duPont defeated (France) Nelly Adamson 7–5, 6–2

=== Men's doubles ===
(United States) Pancho Gonzales / (United States) Frank Parker defeated (South Africa) Eustace Fannin / (South Africa) Eric Sturgess 6–3, 8–6, 5–7, 6–3

=== Women's doubles ===
(United States) Margaret Osborne duPont / (United States) Louise Brough defeated (United Kingdom) Joy Gannon / (United Kingdom) Betty Hilton 7–5, 6–1

=== Mixed doubles ===
(South Africa) Sheila Piercey Summers / (South Africa) Eric Sturgess defeated (United Kingdom) Jean Quertier / (United Kingdom) Gerry Oakley 6–1, 6–1

Preceded by 1949 Australian Championships	Grand Slams	Succeeded by 1949 Wimbledon Championships
