= Robert Abdesselam =

French tennis player (1920–2006)

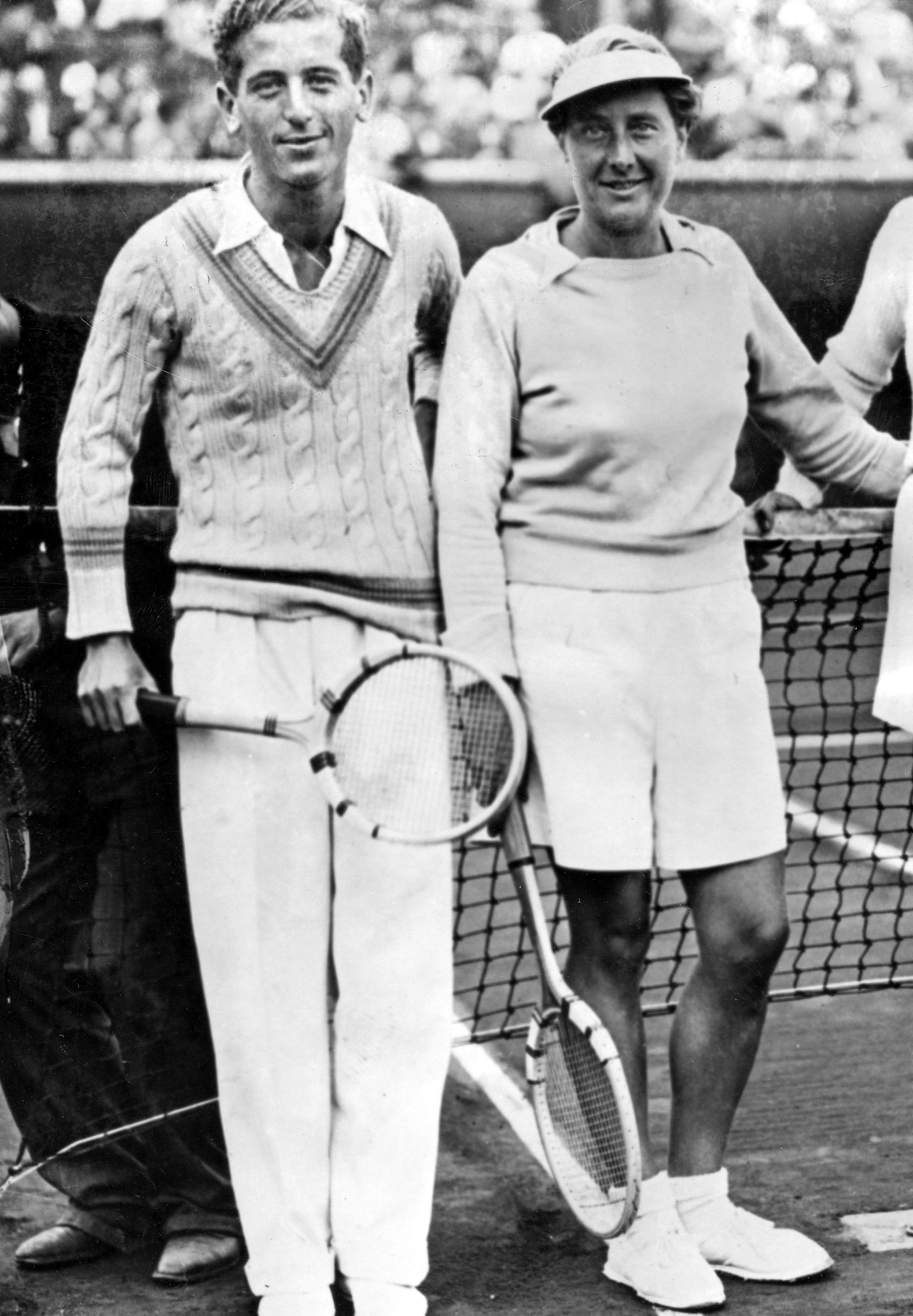
- Robert and Alice Weiwers, 1941.
- Country (sports): France
- Born: 27 January 1920 El Biar, French Algeria
- Died: 26 July 2006 (aged 86) Paris, France
- Height: 1.70 m (5 ft 7 in)
- Plays: Right-handed

Singles
- Career record: 241-165 (59.4%)
- Career titles: 19

Grand Slam singles results
- French Open: QF (1949)
- Wimbledon: 4R (1947)
- US Open: 3R (1949)

Doubles

Grand Slam doubles results
- Wimbledon: 3R (1949)

Mixed doubles

Grand Slam mixed doubles results
- Wimbledon: 4R (1946)

Robert Abdesselam (27 January 1920 – 26 July 2006) was a noted French international tennis player. He competed in the Davis Cup a number of times, from 1947 to 1953.

== Biography ==
Robert Abdesselam was born in El Biar on 27 January 1920, son of Kabyle Muslim Mehana Abdesselam, attorney at the Paris Court of Appeal, and a Catholic mother, Marguerite Tedeschi, after a famous painter of the Parisian bourgeoisie. He grew up in El Biar and discovered tennis which would become his passion. He attended secondary school at Algiers and at Lycée Janson de Sailly in Paris. Abdesselam followed courses at Sciences Po and obtained a law degree at the Law Faculty of Paris. He continued along with tennis and became one of the best French players. He was junior champion of France twice in 1937 and 1938, then world champion University in 1939. During the Second World War, when he reached his best, he joined Algiers in 1942 after the Allied landings in North Africa. He participated as a liaison officer in the Italian campaign in the French Expeditionary Corps under the command of Marshal Alphonse Juin. He was recommended several times and obtained the Cross of War 1939–1945 and the U.S. Bronze Star Medal.

When the war ended, his international career as a tennis player resumed. For a number of years he was the second-best French player and was selected fourteen times in Davis Cup from 1947 to 1953 and compiled a record of 11 match wins and 10 losses. He reached the fourth round of the French Championships in 1938 and 1947 and the quarterfinals in 1949. In 1946 he won the All England Plate, a competition for players who were defeated in the first or second rounds of the Wimbledon singles competition. In 1947 he reached the fourth round of the singles event at Wimbledon. Abdesselam won the singles title at the 1948 International Championships of Egypt in Alexandria after defeating Philippe Washer in the final.

From 1946 to 1963 Abdesselam was also counsel to the Court of Appeals of Algiers.

In 1956, he decided to end his sporting career and devote himself to politics. He was elected MNA in Algiers in 1958 for the Unité de la République. Abdesselam argued for the maintenance of French Algeria, which cuts of Gaullism, and integration, which cuts the Organisation armée secrète (OAS). Considered by Algerian independence fighters as a traitor, he was riddled with bullets in Paris by an activist of the Front de Libération Nationale (FLN) on 4 May 1960. On 8 November 1961, Robert Abdesselam was one of 80 parliamentarians who voted for the "amendment Salan." He was an opponent of the Évian Accords and in March 1962 called them "inhumane, disgraceful and unworthy of our country." The same year he was called as a witness at the trial of Edmond Jouhaud and Raoul Salan.

After the independence of Algeria in 1962, Abdesselam abandoned politics to devote himself to his profession of international lawyer. He took part in the development of the Lacoste company abroad. From 1968 to 1974, he was vice-president of the French Tennis Federation and, from 1975 to 1976, the International Tennis Federation. He was also Chairman of the Racing Club de France from 1959 to 1992 and president of the International Lawn Tennis Club from 1993 to 2004. In 1998, he testified at the trial of Maurice Papon who he had met in Morocco in 1948 during a tournament. He died in Paris on 26 July 2006 and his funeral was held in the chapel of the Military Academy. In his biography of Robert Abdesselam, Michel Dreyfus describes his life as "more exciting than a novel".

== Distinctions ==
- Commander of the Legion of Honor
- War Cross 1939–1945 (3 citations)
- Bronze Star Medal, the fourth highest award for bravery American, heroism and merit
- Foundation Robert Abdesselam

In memory of Abdesselam, the Fondation Robert Abdesselam was created under the aegis of the Fondation de France, 22 January 2007. In particular, it aims to help former tennis champions in their retraining project and award prize "Robert Abdesselam" rewarding research on the defense of trademark law and international organizations in favor of maintaining peace.
