= Benny Berthet =

French tennis player and coach

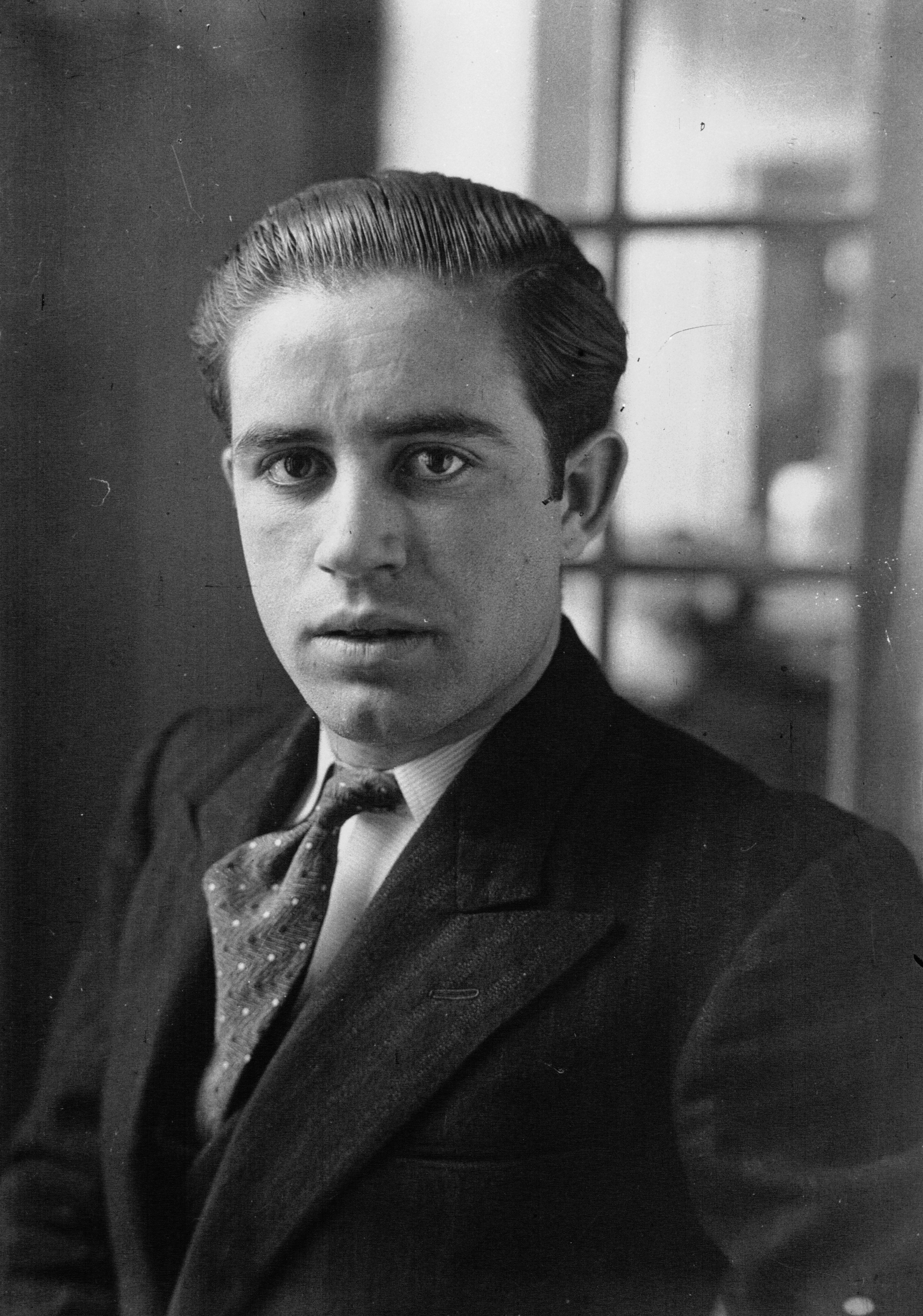
- Full name: Benjamin Berthet
- Country (sports): France
- Born: 18 September 1910; New York, United States
- Died: 20 January 1981 (aged 70); Paris, France
- Plays: Right-handed

Singles

Grand Slam singles results
- French Open: QF (1931)
- Wimbledon: 1R (1931, 1950)

Benjamin Berthet (18 September 1910 – 20 January 1981) was a French tennis player and coach.

Berthet was born to Polish-Jewish emigrants in New York and moved to France as a nine-year old.

In 1931 he made the singles quarter-finals of the French Championships, losing to the top seed Jean Borotra.

Berthet's title wins included the Polish International Championships.

A jeweller by profession, Berthet fought with the French Army in World War II and became a prisoner of war in 1941. During his captivity at Oflag IV-D he and other prisoners build tennis courts to play on.

Berthet continued to compete after the war until his appointment as non playing captain of the France Davis Cup team in 1954. He held this role for a then record 11-years, before being replaced by Gérard Pilet after the 1955 campaign.
