= Gerry Oakley =

British tennis player

- Full name: Gerald Oakley
- Country (sports): Great Britain
- Born: 25 July 1933 (age 91); Purley, Surrey, England
- Height: 6 ft 3 in (191 cm)
- Plays: Right-handed

Singles

Grand Slam singles results
- French Open: 2R (1949, 1954)
- Wimbledon: 3R (1951, 1957, 1959)
- US Open: 3R (1952)

Doubles

Grand Slam doubles results
- Wimbledon: 3R (1963)

Grand Slam mixed doubles results
- French Open: F (1949)
- Wimbledon: QF (1952)

Gerald Oakley (born 25 July 1933) is a British former tennis player.

Born in Purley, Surrey, Oakley was a tall bespectacled player, active on tour from the 1940s to 1960s.

Oakley, a mixed doubles finalist at the 1949 French Championships, represented the Great Britain Davis Cup team in 1953 and 1953. He won both of his singles rubbers, including a five-set match against Wimbledon champion Bob Falkenburg of Brazil.

== Grand Slam finals ==
=== Mixed doubles (1 runner-up) ===
Result	Year	Championship	Surface	Partner	Opponents	Score
Loss	1949	French Championships	Clay	(United Kingdom) Jean Quertier	(South Africa) Sheila Piercey Summers (South Africa) Eric Sturgess	1–6, 1–6

== See also ==
- List of Great Britain Davis Cup team representatives
