= Philippe Chatrier =

French tennis player

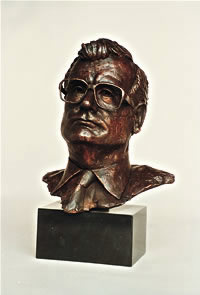
- Philippe Chatrier bust by Laurence Broderick
- Country (sports): France
- Born: 2 February 1928 Créteil, France
- Died: 23 June 2000 (aged 72) Dinard, France
- Turned pro: 1947 (amateur tour)
- Retired: 1960
- Int. Tennis HoF: 1992 (member page)

Singles
- Career record: 6–17

Grand Slam singles results
- French Open: 3R (1949)
- Wimbledon: 3R (1951)
- US Open: 1R (1955)

Doubles
- Career record: 0–0

Grand Slam doubles results
- Wimbledon: 2R (1950, 1953)

Grand Slam mixed doubles results
- Wimbledon: 4R (1960)

Coaching career (1969)
- France Davis Cup team

Philippe Chatrier (French pronunciation: [filip ʃatʁije]; 2 February 1928 – 23 June 2000) was a French tennis player. After his playing career ended, he became a journalist, and was then involved in sports administration. He was president of the French Tennis Federation for 20 years, from 1973 to 1993, and president of the International Tennis Federation for 14 years, from 1977 to 1991.

== Life and career ==
Chatrier was born in Créteil in France. He was the French junior tennis champion in 1945. After retiring, he became a journalist. He founded the magazine Tennis de France in 1953, and also sports and news editor for the Paris daily newspaper Paris-Presse.

Chatrier married tennis player Susan Partridge in 1953. They later divorced. Chatrier later married a second time to French golfer Claudine Cros.

Chatrier took part in the merger of professional and amateur tennis organisations in 1968. He was a vice president of the French Tennis Federation (Fédération française de tennis) from 1968 to 1973, and was captain of French Davis Cup team in 1969. He became president of the French Tennis Federation in 1973, then president of International Tennis Federation in 1977. Under his direction, tennis was reintroduced to the Olympic program in 1981 as a demonstration sport at the 1984 Summer Olympic Games in Los Angeles, and then a full Olympic sport beginning in the 1988 Summer Olympic Games in Seoul. He became a member of the International Olympic Committee in 1988.

Chatrier retired as president from the International Tennis Federation in 1991. He became a member of the International Tennis Hall of Fame in 1992. He retired as president of the French Tennis Federation in 1993.

Chatrier died in Dinard on 23 June 2000. The main tennis court at the Stade de Roland Garros, the home of the French Open in Paris, was renamed the Court Philippe Chatrier in his honour in 2001. He had two sons from his first marriage. The elder, Jean-Philippe Chatrier, was an actor.

== See also ==
- Philippe Chatrier Award
