= Gil de Kermadec =

French tennis player

- Country (sports): France
- Born: 1922
- Died: 27 May 2011 (aged 89)

Singles
- Career titles: 3 (ILTF)

Grand Slam singles results
- French Open: 3R (1951)
- Wimbledon: 1R (1953, 1955)

Gil Marc de Kermadec (1922 – 27 May 2011) was a French tennis player.

Active on tour in the 1948 to 1965, de Kermadec was the son of painter Eugène de Kermadec. He made the singles third round of the 1951 French Championships and featured in multiple editions of the Wimbledon Championships. He won the Brumana International in 1952 against Nazmi Bari.

In the early 1960s he was appointed National Technical Director for the French Tennis Federation.

Footage that he captured on the courts of Roland Garros for a series of instructional videos later featured in the 2018 documentary John McEnroe: In the Realm of Perfection.
