= Nigel Cockburn =

South African tennis player (died 1957)

- Full name: Nigel M. Cockburn
- Country (sports): South Africa
- Died: 8 March 1957 (aged 34)

Singles

Grand Slam singles results
- French Open: 3R (1951, 1952)
- Wimbledon: 4R (1949)

Nigel M. Cockburn was a South African tennis player of Scottish descent.

A native of Natal, Cockburn was active on tour in the 1940s and 1950s. While touring the British Isles in 1949 he made the fourth round at Wimbledon and won both the Irish Championships and Scottish Championships. He had further success in England in 1951 when he claimed the All England Plate. In 1952 he beat 15th-seed Enrique Morea at the French Championships, before losing his third round match in five sets to Kurt Nielsen.

Cockburn died of an undisclosed illness in 1957 at the age of 34.
