= Philippe Washer =

Belgian tennis player (1924–2015)

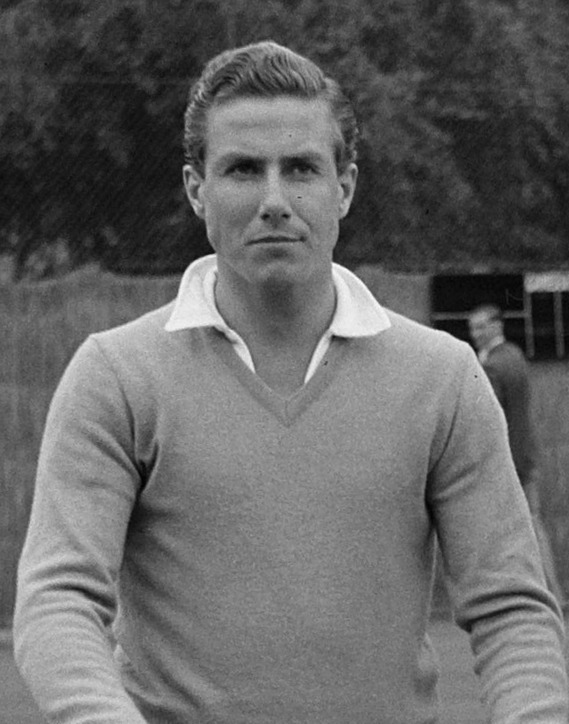
- Washer in 1950
- Country (sports): Belgium
- Born: 6 August 1924 Brussels, Belgium
- Died: 27 November 2015 (aged 91) Knokke, West Flanders, Belgium
- Turned pro: 1940 (amateur tour)
- Retired: 1961

Singles
- Career record: 324-178
- Career titles: 16
- Highest ranking: 8 (1957)

Grand Slam singles results
- French Open: QF (1957)
- Wimbledon: 4R (1948, 1949, 1954)
- US Open: 4R (1952)

Doubles

Grand Slam doubles results
- Wimbledon: SF (1953)

Grand Slam mixed doubles results
- French Open: SF (1954)
- Wimbledon: 4R (1947, 1948, 1952)

Philippe Washer (French pronunciation: [filip waʃe]; 6 August 1924 – 27 November 2015) was a Belgian tennis player. He competed in the Davis Cup a number of times, from 1946 to 1961. He was ranked world No. 8 in 1957.

== Early life and family ==
Philippe Washer was born on 6 August 1924 in Brussels. He was the son of Jean Washer, another Belgian tennis player and textile industry mogul. His mother, Simone van der Straeten, was the granddaughter of Ernest Solvay, founder of Solvay International Chemical Group. Philippe had three brothers: Paul Washer, president of the Chemical Industry Federation of Belgium and director of the Solvay company; Jacques Washer, antiquarian who died in the Swissair Flight 316 crash; and Edouard. They were also the cousins of famous sportscar racer Olivier Gendebien. Philippe started playing tennis at the age of six. He was coached by his father. He won his first tournament on 9 May 1940 in La Rasante just one day before the Battle of Belgium during which he volunteered to join the Belgian Army. In 1942, he won the French junior championships.

== Tennis career ==
Washer won the Belgian National Championships nine times between 1945–1954, the only exception being 1950 when he was forced to retire from the competition due to illness. In 1952, he reached the semifinal of the Royal Belgian Tennis Federation Fiftieth Anniversary tournament.

In 1953, Washer won the Coupe Albert Canet, defeating Władysław Skonecki in the close four set final.

In 1957, he reached the Inter-Zonal Zone Finals of the Davis Cup with the Belgium Davis Cup team. The same year, he won the Lebanon international tennis championships by defeating Roger Becker, Ham Richardson, and Warren Woodcock.

In 1967, he came back from retirement to win the Belgian National Covered Courts Championship doubles, partnering with Jacky Brichant. Also after retirement, he won the Wimbledon Veterans' Doubles with Jaroslav Drobný four times from 1968 to 1971.

== Golf career ==
Washer did not play in the 1960 Davis Cup match against Great Britain as he was competing in the Belgium Open golf championship. Later in 1960 he played for the Rest of Europe against the British Isles in the St Andrews Trophy and for Belgium in the 1960 Eisenhower Trophy. He represented Belgium again in the 1964 Eisenhower Trophy.

== Personal life ==
Washer retired from tennis in 1961 and moved to Switzerland. In 1955, he lent his own Ferrari 250 Europa GT Pinin Farina Coupe car to Olivier Gendebien who drove it in the Liège–Rome–Liège rally and finished third. After retiring, he served as the president of the Royal Léopold Club from 1983 to 1994, which his family saved from bankruptcy in 1948. He remained its major shareholder afterwards. Washer died on 27 November 2015 at the age of 91.

== Works cited ==
- Tasso, Miguel (2002). "Philippe Washer préfère les filles" [Philippe Washer prefers girls]. La Libre Belgique (in French). Brussels, Belgium.
- MIG. T. (2007). "Philippe Washer:"Je regarde toujours devant moi"" [Philippe Washer: "I always look forward"]. La Dernière Heure (in French). Brussels, Belgium: Groupe IPM. ISSN 1780-0412.
- "obituaries – Jaroslav Drobny". The Daily Telegraph. London, United Kingdom. 2001. ISSN 0307-1235.
- Meuwissen, Eric (1992). "Waterloo: Washer lotit" [Waterloo: Washer subdivides]. Le Soir (in French). Brussels, Belgium. ISSN 1186-4583.
- Chauvin, Xavier (February 2010). "Dossier: Ferrari Belrinetta" (PDF). Rétroviseur (in French) (253). Fontainebleau, France: Éditions LVA: 54. ISSN 0992-5007. Archived from the original on 4 March 2016.
- "History" (in French). Brussels, Belgium: Royal Léopold Club. Archived from the original on 27 April 2014.
- Nohad Victor Schoucair. "1957 / April 7". Lebanon: Lebanon International Tenis. Archived from the original on 15 July 2013.
- Leonardi, Paolo (1997). "Le tennis etait presque aussi populaire que le football" [Tennis was almost as popular as football]. Le Soir (in French). Brussels, Belgium. ISSN 1186-4583.
- 1964 World Amateur Golf Team Championships Record Book (PDF) (in French). 1964. p. 12.
