= Budge Patty =

American tennis player (1924–2021)

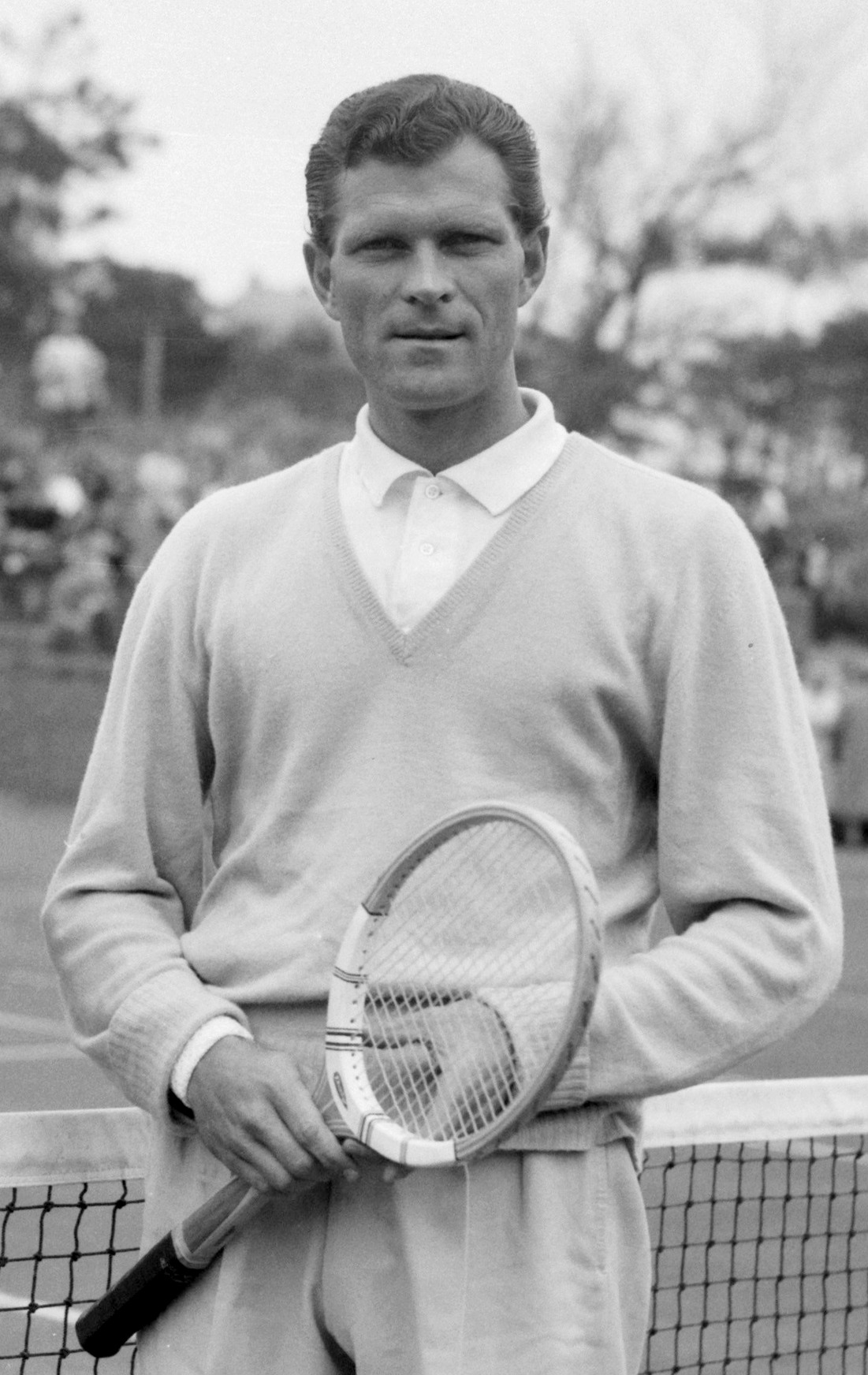
- Patty in 1958
- Full name: Edward John Patty
- Country (sports): United States
- Born: February 11, 1924 Fort Smith, Arkansas, U.S.
- Died: October 4, 2021 (aged 97) Lausanne, Switzerland
- Turned pro: 1940 (amateur tour)
- Retired: 1960
- Plays: Right-handed (1-handed backhand)
- Int. Tennis HoF: 1977 (member page)

Singles
- Career record: 777–182 (81.02%)
- Career titles: 73
- Highest ranking: No. 1 (1950, John Olliff)

Grand Slam singles results
- French Open: W (1950)
- Wimbledon: W (1950)
- US Open: QF (1951, 1953, 1957)

Grand Slam doubles results
- Wimbledon: W (1957)
- US Open: F (1957)

Grand Slam mixed doubles results
- French Open: W (1946)
- Wimbledon: SF (1946)

Edward John Patty (February 11, 1924 – October 4, 2021), better known as Budge Patty, was an American world no. 1 tennis player whose career spanned a period of 15 years after World War II. He won two Grand Slam singles titles in 1950. He was the second American male player to win the Channel Slam (winning the French Open and Wimbledon in the same year) and one of only four as of 2024 (the others were Don Budge, Tony Trabert and Andre Agassi).

== Early life ==
Edward John Patty was born in Fort Smith, Arkansas, on February 11, 1924. His grandmother was born in France, while one of his grandfathers was Austrian. His family relocated to Los Angeles during his childhood, and he attended Los Angeles High School. He was nicknamed "Budge" by his brother, who perceived Patty to be lethargic, resulting in a "failure to budge".

Patty started playing tennis as a child, and practised with Pauline Betz every Saturday morning when he was a junior player. After winning the Los Angeles novice championships when he was 13, she encouraged him to take lessons with Bill Weissbuch at the Beverly Hills Tennis Club. There, Patty was discovered by Barbara Stanwyck and Robert Taylor, who provided him with financial support to travel to national junior championships. He triumphed at the under-15 national championships in 1939, before winning both the singles and doubles titles at the under-18 tournament two years later. He then defended his singles title in 1942. Patty intended to study at the University of Southern California, but was drafted into the US Army several days after registering. He was eventually discharged in January 1946.

== Career ==
After his return from military service, Patty partnered with Betz to win the mixed doubles title at the 1946 French Championships. Three years later, he reached the final of the singles event, where he lost to fellow American Frank Parker. He then won his first major singles title at the 1950 French Championships, where he won three consecutive matches in five sets, including the final against Jaroslav Drobný. Several weeks later, he won the 1950 Wimbledon Championships in a four-set victory over Frank Sedgman. Patty became the second American man – after Don Budge in 1938 – to win the Channel Slam. Since then, only Tony Trabert in 1955 has achieved the feat among male players from the US. Patty was also the fourth consecutive male player from Southern California to win Wimbledon (after Jack Kramer, Bob Falkenburg, and Ted Schroeder). At the end of the year, Patty was ranked amateur world no. 1 in 1950 by John Olliff of The Daily Telegraph.

At the 1953 Wimbledon Championships, Patty faced Drobný again in the third round. Patty lost the five-set match that lasted four hours and twenty minutes, despite having six match points on Drobny’s serve. It was the longest continuous tennis match at the time. He later recounted to The Telegraph in 2000 how he "could hardly see a thing" towards the end of that match, adding: "I was so tired I barely knew where I was". Patty partnered with Gardnar Mulloy in 1957 to win the Wimbledon men's doubles title, upsetting top seeds Lew Hoad and Neale Fraser in the final. Patty (aged 33) and Mulloy (aged 43) were the oldest team to win Wimbledon after World War I. The duo also reached the final of the 1957 U.S. National Championships two months later, but lost in four sets to Fraser and Ashley Cooper.

The final tournament of Patty's career was the 1960 Wimbledon Championships, where he lost to Italy's Nicola Pietrangeli in the first round. Patty stayed amateur throughout his career and won over 70 singles titles. These included the German International Championship in 1953 and 1954, as well as the Italian Championship in 1954. He finished seven years ranked within the Top 10 between 1947 and 1957. He was subsequently inducted in the International Tennis Hall of Fame in 1977.

== Grand Slam finals ==
=== Singles (2 titles, 1 runner-up) ===
Result	Year	Championship	Surface	Opponent	Score
Loss	1949	French Championships	Clay	(United States) Frank Parker	3–6, 6–1, 1–6, 4–6
Win	1950	French Championships	Clay	(Egypt) Jaroslav Drobný	6–1, 6–2, 2–6, 5–7, 7–5
Win	1950	Wimbledon	Grass	(Australia) Frank Sedgman	6–1, 8–10, 6–2, 6–3

=== Doubles (1 title, 1 runner-up) ===
Result	Year	Championship	Surface	Partner	Opponents	Score
Win	1957	Wimbledon	Grass	(United States) Gardnar Mulloy	(Australia) Neale Fraser (Australia) Lew Hoad	8–10, 6–4, 6–4, 6–4
Loss	1957	U.S. Championships	Grass	(United States) Gardnar Mulloy	(Australia) Ashley Cooper (Australia) Neale Fraser	6–4, 3–6, 7–9, 3–6

=== Mixed Doubles (1 title) ===
Result	Year	Championship	Surface	Partner	Opponents	Score
Win	1946	French Championships	Clay	(United States) Pauline Betz	(United States) Dorothy Bundy (United States) Tom Brown	7–5, 9–7

== Performance timeline ==
Key
W	F	SF	QF	#R	RR	Q#	DNQ	A	NH

(W) winner; (F) finalist; (SF) semifinalist; (QF) quarterfinalist; (#R) rounds 4, 3, 2, 1; (RR) round-robin stage; (Q#) qualification round; (DNQ) did not qualify; (A) absent; (NH) not held; (SR) strike rate (events won / competed); (W–L) win–loss record.

Tournament	1941	1942–1945	1946	1947	1948	1949	1950	1951	1952	1953	1954	1955	1956	1957	1958	1959	1960
Grand Slam tournaments
Australian	A	A	A	A	A	A	A	A	A	A	A	A	A	A	A	A	A
French	A	A	QF	4R	SF	F	W	4R	QF	4R	SF	QF	4R	4R	4R	3R	2R
Wimbledon	A	A	4R	SF	QF	3R	W	2R	4R	3R	SF	SF	2R	4R	4R	1R	1R
U.S.	2R	A	4R	A	3R	A	1R	QF	A	QF	A	A	A	QF	1R	A	A

== Personal life ==
Patty moved to Paris after World War II and became fluent in French. During the late 1950s, he was employed by a travel agency there when he was not playing competitive tennis. He also featured in bit parts of films and worked in real estate. He ultimately resided in Europe for over seven decades. Patty married Maria Marcina Sfezzo in Lausanne in 1961. They remained married until his death. Together, they had two children: Christine and Elaine.

Patty died on October 4, 2021, at a hospital in Lausanne, Switzerland. He was 97 years old.

== Publications ==
- Patty, Edward John (1951). Tennis My Way by Budge Patty. New York: Hutchinson's Library of Sports and Pastimes. LCCN 51008955.
