= Eric Sturgess =

South African tennis player (1920–2004)

- Full name: Eric William Sturgess
- Country (sports): South Africa
- Born: 10 May 1920 Johannesburg, South Africa
- Died: 14 January 2004 (aged 83) Sunninghill, South Africa
- Plays: Right-handed (one-handed backhand)

Singles
- Career record: 292–55 (84.15%)
- Highest ranking: No. 6 (1948, John Olliff)

Grand Slam singles results
- Australian Open: SF (1950)
- French Open: F (1947, 1951)
- Wimbledon: SF (1951)
- US Open: F (1948)

Doubles
- Career record: 0–1

Grand Slam doubles results
- Australian Open: F (1950)
- French Open: W (1947)
- Wimbledon: F (1951, 1952)

Grand Slam mixed doubles results
- Australian Open: F (1950)
- French Open: W (1947, 1949)
- Wimbledon: W (1949, 1950)
- US Open: W (1949)

Eric William Sturgess (10 May 1920 – 14 January 2004) was a South African male tennis player and winner of six Grand Slam doubles titles. He also reached the singles final of a Grand Slam tournament three times but never won. Sturgess was ranked World No. 6 by John Olliff of The Daily Telegraph in both 1948 and 1949.

== Biography ==
Eric Sturgess was born in Johannesburg, where he attended Parktown Boys' High School. Sturgess joined the South African Air Force on the outbreak of World War II and became an instructor with No 4 Spitfire Squadron, SAAF. In October 1944 he was shot down by anti-aircraft fire, captured on landing and sent to the air force officers' prison camp, Stalag Luft III, in eastern Germany. In January 1945 he was transported to Stalag IIIA at Luckenwalde which was liberated two months later by the advancing Russian forces.

He reached the singles final of the 1947 and 1951 French Championships but lost to Hungarian József Asbóth (6–8, 5–7, 4–6) and Jaroslav Drobný (6–3, 6–3, 6–3) respectively. In 1947 he won the doubles competition with countryman Eustace Fannin. In 1948 he reached the singles final at the U.S. National Championships but lost to American Pancho Gonzales.

In 1947 and 1948 he won the British Hard Court Championships played in Bournemouth. He won the first three Swedish Open tournaments (1948, 1949, 1950), played in Båstad. Sturgess won a record 11 singles titles at the South African Championships between 1939 and 1957.

At both the 1951 and 1952 South African Open, he won in the finals playing Syd Levy of South Africa.

By the end of his career Sturgess had reached 15 Grand Slam finals (three in singles, six in doubles and six in mixed doubles). He won four titles (the 1947 French Championships doubles title, the 1949 French Championships mixed doubles title and the 1949 and 1950 Wimbledon mixed doubles title).

He represented South Africa in the Davis Cup competition in six ties, compiling a 13–5 record in singles and doubles.

== Grand Slam finals ==
=== Singles (3 runner-ups) ===
Result	Year	Championship	Surface	Opponent	Score
Loss	1947	French Championships	Clay	(Hungary) József Asbóth	6–8, 5–7, 4–6
Loss	1948	U.S. National Championships	Grass	(United States) Pancho Gonzales	2–6, 3–6, 12–14
Loss	1951	French Championships	Clay	(Egypt) Jaroslav Drobný	3–6, 3–6, 3–6

=== Doubles (1 title, 5 runner-ups) ===
Result	Year	Championship	Surface	Partner	Opponents	Score
Win	1947	French Championships	Clay	(South Africa) Eustace Fannin	(United States) Tom Brown (Australia) Bill Sidwell	6–4, 4–6, 6–4, 6–3
Loss	1949	French Championships	Clay	(South Africa) Eustace Fannin	(United States) Pancho Gonzales (United States) Frank Parker	3–6, 6–8, 7–5, 3–6
Loss	1950	Australian Championships	Grass	(Egypt) Jaroslav Drobný	(Australia) John Bromwich (Australia) Adrian Quist	3–6, 7–5, 6–4, 3–6, 6–8
Loss	1950	French Championships	Clay	(Egypt) Jaroslav Drobný	(United States) Bill Talbert (United States) Tony Trabert	2–6, 6–1, 8–10, 2–6
Loss	1951	Wimbledon	Grass	(Egypt) Jaroslav Drobný	(Australia) Ken McGregor (Australia) Frank Sedgman	6–3, 2–6, 3–6, 6–3, 3–6
Loss	1952	Wimbledon	Grass	(United States) Vic Seixas	(Australia) Ken McGregor (Australia) Frank Sedgman	3–6, 5–7, 4–6

=== Mixed doubles (5 titles, 2 runner-ups) ===
Result	Year	Championship	Surface	Partner	Opponents	Score
Win	1947	French Championships	Clay	(South Africa) Sheila Piercey Summers	(Poland) Jadwiga Jędrzejowska (Romania) Cristea Caralulis	6–0, 6–0
Win	1949	French Championships	Clay	(South Africa) Sheila Piercey Summers	(United Kingdom) Jean Quertier (United Kingdom) Gerry Oakley	6–1, 6–1
Win	1949	Wimbledon	Grass	(South Africa) Sheila Piercey Summers	(United States) Louise Brough (Australia) John Bromwich	9–7, 9–11, 7–5
Win	1949	U.S. National Championships	Grass	(United States) Louise Brough	(United States) Margaret Osborne duPont (United States) Bill Talbert	4–6, 6–3, 7–5
Loss	1950	Australian Championships	Grass	(Australia) Joyce Fitch	(United States) Doris Hart (Australia) Frank Sedgman	6–8, 4–6
Win	1950	Wimbledon	Grass	(United States) Louise Brough	(United States) Pat Canning Todd (Australia) Geoff Brown	11–9, 1–6, 6–4
Loss	1952	French Championships	Clay	(United States) Shirley Fry	(United States) Doris Hart (Australia) Frank Sedgman	8–6, 3–6, 3–6
