= 1948 Wimbledon Championships – Men's doubles =

Men's doubles
- 1948 Wimbledon Championships

Final
- Champions: (Australia) John Bromwich (Australia) Frank Sedgman
- Runners-up: (United States) Tom Brown (United States) Gardnar Mulloy
- Score: 5–7, 7–5, 7–5, 9–7

Details
- Draw: 64 (5Q)
- Seeds: 4

Events
Singles	men	women		boys	girls
Doubles	men	women	mixed	boys	girls
- Wimbledon Championships

Bob Falkenburg and Jack Kramer were the defending champions, but Kramer was ineligible to compete after turning professional at the end of the 1947 season. Falkenburg partnered with Frank Parker, but lost to John Bromwich and Frank Sedgman in the semifinals.

Bromwich and Sedgman defeated Tom Brown and Gardnar Mulloy in the final, 5–7, 7–5, 7–5, 9–7 to win the gentlemen's doubles tennis title at the 1948 Wimbledon Championship.

== Seeds ==
1. (Brazil) Bob Falkenburg / (United States) Frank Parker (semifinals)
2. (United States) Tom Brown / (United States) Gardnar Mulloy (final)
3. (Australia) John Bromwich / (Australia) Frank Sedgman (champions)
4. (United Kingdom) Tony Mottram / (South Africa) Eric Sturgess (quarterfinals)

Click on the seed number of a player to go to their draw section.

== Draw ==
Key

- Q = Qualifier
- WC = Wild card
- LL = Lucky loser
- Alt = Alternate
- ITF = ITF entry
- PR = Protected ranking
- SR = Special ranking
- SE = Special exempt
- JE = Junior exempt
- JR = Junior Accelerator Programme entrant
- CO = College Accelerator Programme entrant
- NG = Next Gen Accelerator Program entrant
- w/o = Walkover
- r = Retired
- d = Defaulted

=== Finals ===
Quarterfinals
2	(United States) Tom Brown (United States) Gardnar Mulloy	9	4	3	9	6
(Argentina) Enrique Morea (Argentina) Alejo Russell	7	6	6	7	2
4	(United Kingdom) Tony Mottram (South Africa) Eric Sturgess	3	4	4
(Sweden) Lennart Bergelin (Australia) Jack Harper	6	6	6
(Italy) Giovanni Cucelli (Italy) Marcello del Bello	3	1	5
3	(Australia) John Bromwich (Australia) Frank Sedgman	6	6	7
(Socialist Federal Republic of Yugoslavia) Franjo Kukuljević (Czechoslovakia) Vojtěch Vodička	1	2	6	0
1	(Brazil) Bob Falkenburg (United States) Frank Parker	6	6	3	6

Semifinals
2	(United States) Tom Brown (United States) Gardnar Mulloy	1	6	4	6	8
(Sweden) Lennart Bergelin (Australia) Jack Harper	6	3	6	4	6
3	(Australia) John Bromwich (Australia) Frank Sedgman	6	6	4	6	6
1	(Brazil) Bob Falkenburg (United States) Frank Parker	2	8	6	4	1

Final
2	(United States) Tom Brown (United States) Gardnar Mulloy	7	5	5	7
3	(Australia) John Bromwich (Australia) Frank Sedgman	5	7	7	9

=== Top half ===
==== Section 1 ====
First round
2	(United States) Tom Brown (United States) Gardnar Mulloy	9	6	6
(Socialist Federal Republic of Yugoslavia) Dragutin Mitić (Socialist Federal Republic of Yugoslavia) Josip Palada	7	3	4
(India) Sumant Misra (India) Subba Sawhney	6	8	6
(Italy) Renato Bossi (Italy) Ferruccio Quintavalle	1	6	4
(United Kingdom) Henry Billington (United Kingdom) Don Butler	6	6	6
(Pakistan) Mahmoud Alam (Pakistan) Ahmed-Hasan Khokhar	3	4	4
(United Kingdom) Guy Cooper (United Kingdom) Henry Weatherall	6	4	5
(United Kingdom) Brian Finnigan (United States) John Wilkinson	8	6	7
(France) Jean Ducos de la Haille (Italy) Carlo Sada	7	4	5
(Argentina) Enrique Morea (Argentina) Alejo Russell	9	6	7
(United Kingdom) Norman Kitovitz (United Kingdom) David Mockridge	1	6	4
(Hungary) Zoltán Katona (Argentina) Heraldo Weiss	6	8	6
(Egypt) Eddie Mandelbaum (Egypt) Henri Zalzal	8	4	3
(United States) Budge Patty (Belgium) Philippe Washer	10	6	6
(United Kingdom) Bobby Meredith (United Kingdom) Douglas Snart	6	6	6
(Denmark) Kurt Nielsen (Denmark) Torben Ulrich	2	2	3

Second round
2	(United States) T Brown (United States) G Mulloy	6	5	4	7	6
(India) S Misra (India) S Sawhney	1	7	6	5	3
(United Kingdom) H Billington (United Kingdom) D Butler	7	6	6
(United Kingdom) B Finnigan (United States) J Wilkinson	5	4	1
(Argentina) E Morea (Argentina) A Russell	6	6	6
(Hungary) Z Katona (Argentina) H Weiss	3	2	4
(United States) J Patty (Belgium) P Washer	6	6	6
(United Kingdom) G Meredith (United Kingdom) D Snart	2	4	1

Third round
2	(United States) T Brown (United States) G Mulloy	6	6	6
(United Kingdom) H Billington (United Kingdom) D Butler	3	3	4
(Argentina) E Morea (Argentina) A Russell	6	6	13
(United States) J Patty (Belgium) P Washer	2	4	11

Quarterfinals
2	(United States) T Brown (United States) G Mulloy	9	4	3	9	6
(Argentina) E Morea (Argentina) A Russell	7	6	6	7	2

==== Section 2 ====
First round
4	(United Kingdom) Tony Mottram (South Africa) Eric Sturgess	6	6	6
(Sweden) Borje Fornstedt (Norway) Johan Haanes	2	3	4
(United Kingdom) Geoff Emmett (United Kingdom) Ralph Nichols	4	4	10
(United Kingdom) Lindsay Hare (United Kingdom) Peter Hare	6	6	12
(United Kingdom) Ted Frith (United Kingdom) Paddy Roberts	2	5	6	1
(United Kingdom) Roy Mansell (United Kingdom) Gwyn Tuckett	6	7	4	6
(United Kingdom) John Griffith (United Kingdom) Jack Moore	6	3	1	4
(Egypt) Marcel Coen (Netherlands) Boebi van Meegeren	3	6	6	6
Q	(Australia) Joseph Clynton-Reed (United Kingdom) Malcolm Maclagan	0	0	2
Q	(United Kingdom) Tommy Anderson (United Kingdom) DC Argyle	6	6	6
(New Zealand) Dennis Coombe (United Kingdom) Charles Kingsley	4	3	6
(Republic of Ireland) Guy Jackson (Republic of Ireland) Matthew Murphy	6	6	8
(Sweden) Lennart Bergelin (Australia) Jack Harper	6	6	6
(Belgium) Pierre Geelhand de Merxem (Belgium) Jack Van den Eynde	4	1	4
(United Kingdom) Colin Ritchie (United Kingdom) Dickie Ritchie	2	3	6	1
(France) Christian Grandet (France) Paul Rémy	6	6	1	6

Second round
4	(United Kingdom) A Mottram (South Africa) E Sturgess	6	4	7	6
(United Kingdom) L Hare (United Kingdom) P Hare	4	6	5	2
(United Kingdom) R Mansell (United Kingdom) G Tuckett	7	4	3	4
(Egypt) M Coen (Netherlands) R van Meegeren	5	6	6	6
Q	(United Kingdom) T Anderson (United Kingdom) DC Argyle	6	4	0	5
(Republic of Ireland) G Jackson (Republic of Ireland) M Murphy	4	6	6	6
(Sweden) L Bergelin (Australia) J Harper	8	6	6
(France) C Grandet (France) P Rémy	6	1	4

Third round
4	(United Kingdom) A Mottram (South Africa) E Sturgess	6	6	6
(Egypt) M Coen (Netherlands) R van Meegeren	4	3	3
(Republic of Ireland) G Jackson (Republic of Ireland) M Murphy	6	3	4	4
(Sweden) L Bergelin (Australia) J Harper	3	6	6	6

Quarterfinals
4	(United Kingdom) A Mottram (South Africa) E Sturgess	3	4	4
(Sweden) L Bergelin (Australia) J Harper	6	6	6

=== Bottom half ===
==== Section 3 ====
First round
(Australia) Alan Coldham (Poland) Ernest Wittmann	3	3	4
(Italy) Giovanni Cucelli (Italy) Marcello del Bello	6	6	6
(France) Robert Abdesselam (France) Bernard Destremau	6	2	5	6	5
(Spain) Jaime Bartrolí (Spain) Mario Szavoszt	3	6	7	4	7
(India) Dilip Bose (India) Narendra Nath	9	3	3
(Philippines) Felicisimo Ampon (Philippines) Raymundo Deyro	11	6	6
(United Kingdom) Headley Baxter (United Kingdom) Roland Carter	6	4	3	6	9
Q	(United Kingdom) Leslie Cater (United Kingdom) Francis Wallis	3	6	6	2	7
(United Kingdom) Cyril Betts (United Kingdom) Bobby Nicoll	1	2	2
(Czechoslovakia) Vladimír Černík (Czechoslovakia) Jaroslav Drobný	6	6	6
(Switzerland) Jean-Pierre Blondel (Switzerland) Edgar Büchi	4	1	6	4
(United Kingdom) GI Bayley (United Kingdom) Claude Lister	6	6	3	6
(United Kingdom) Derek Bull (United Kingdom) Cliff Hovell	4	6	1
(United Kingdom) Gerry Oakley (Australia) John Spence	6	8	6
(Netherlands) Ivo Rinkel (Netherlands) Hans van Swol	4	1	2
3	(Australia) John Bromwich (Australia) Frank Sedgman	6	6	6

Second round
(Italy) G Cucelli (Italy) M del Bello	6	3	6	6
(Spain) J Bartrolí (Spain) M Szavoszt	3	6	1	4
(Philippines) F Ampon (Philippines) R Deyro	7	7	6
(United Kingdom) H Baxter (United Kingdom) R Carter	5	5	0
(Czechoslovakia) V Černík (Czechoslovakia) J Drobný	6	6	6
(United Kingdom) GI Bayley (United Kingdom) C Lister	3	4	2
(United Kingdom) G Oakley (Australia) J Spence	2	1	2
3	(Australia) J Bromwich (Australia) F Sedgman	6	6	6

Third round
(Italy) G Cucelli (Italy) M del Bello	6	1	6	6
(Philippines) F Ampon (Philippines) R Deyro	4	6	4	3
(Czechoslovakia) V Černík (Czechoslovakia) J Drobný	2	6	2	1
3	(Australia) J Bromwich (Australia) F Sedgman	6	4	6	6

Quarterfinals
(Italy) G Cucelli (Italy) M del Bello	3	1	5
3	(Australia) J Bromwich (Australia) F Sedgman	6	6	7

==== Section 4 ====
First round
(France) Jean Borotra (France) Jacques Brugnon	6	5	7	6
(Poland) Czesław Spychała (Poland) Ignacy Tłoczyński	4	7	5	3
Q	(United Kingdom) Laurie Proctor (United Kingdom) John White	7	4	6	6	6
(Austria) G Jaceniak (Austria) Hans Redl	9	6	1	2	4
(United States) Charles Jones (Belgium) JM Stas	w/o
(Socialist Federal Republic of Yugoslavia) Franjo Kukuljević (Czechoslovakia) Vojtěch Vodička
(Belgium) Jacques Brichant (Belgium) Jacques Peten	6	8	7	3	6
(United Kingdom) Edmund David (United Kingdom) Herman David	2	6	9	6	0
(Republic of Ireland) Cyril Kemp (Republic of Ireland) George McVeagh	8	6	6
(United Kingdom) Stan Clark (United Kingdom) Bunny Whiteman	6	3	1
(United Kingdom) George Godsell (United Kingdom) Ted Tinling	1	4	4
(United Kingdom) Dennis Slack (United Kingdom) Howard Walton	6	6	6
(Hungary) József Asbóth (Hungary) Béla Pető	2	7	9	0
(Australia) Harry Hopman (United Kingdom) Geoffrey Paish	6	9	7	6
(South Africa) Billy Muller (South Africa) Walter Musgrove	1	3	0
1	(Brazil) Bob Falkenburg (United States) Frank Parker	6	6	6

Second round
(France) J Borotra (France) J Brugnon	6	6	7
Q	(United Kingdom) L Proctor (United Kingdom) J White	2	2	5
(Socialist Federal Republic of Yugoslavia) F Kukuljević (Czechoslovakia) V Vodička	6	6	5	6
(Belgium) J Brichant (Belgium) J Peten	3	3	7	2
(Republic of Ireland) C Kemp (Republic of Ireland) G McVeagh	0	7	6	3
(United Kingdom) D Slack (United Kingdom) H Walton	6	9	3	6
(Australia) H Hopman (United Kingdom) G Paish	3	1	7
1	(Brazil) R Falkenburg (United States) F Parker	6	6	9

Third round
(France) J Borotra (France) J Brugnon	6	3	6	3	6
(Socialist Federal Republic of Yugoslavia) F Kukuljević (Czechoslovakia) V Vodička	2	6	4	6	8
(United Kingdom) D Slack (United Kingdom) H Walton	4	3	5
1	(Brazil) R Falkenburg (United States) F Parker	6	6	7

Quarterfinals
(Socialist Federal Republic of Yugoslavia) F Kukuljević (Czechoslovakia) V Vodička	1	2	6	0
1	(Brazil) R Falkenburg (United States) F Parker	6	6	3	6
