= 1948 Davis Cup Europe Zone =

International tennis competition

Details
- Duration: 22 April 1948 – 29 July 1948
- Teams: 25
- Categories: 1948 Davis Cup Europe Zone; 1948 Davis Cup America Zone

Champion
- Winning nation: Czechoslovakia; Qualified for: 1948 Davis Cup; Inter-Zonal Final

The Europe Zone was one of the two regional zones of the 1948 Davis Cup.

25 teams entered the Europe Zone, with the winner going on to compete in the Inter-Zonal Final against the winner of the America Zone. Czechoslovakia defeated Sweden in the final, and went on to face Australia in the Inter-Zonal Final.

== Draw ==
First Round; 22 April–5 May
Netherlands
bye
Portugal
bye
Norway
bye
Great Britain	3
India	2
Hungary	5
Austria	0
Romania	2
France	3
Spain	0
Sweden	4
Switzerland	3
Pakistan	2
Ireland	5
Luxembourg	0
Denmark	3
Egypt	2
Turkey	0
Yugoslavia	5
Italy	w/o
Poland
bye
Czechoslovakia
bye
Brazil
bye
Belgium
bye
Argentina

Second Round; 6–18 May
Scheveningen, Netherlands (clay)
Netherlands	5
Portugal	0
Oslo, Norway (clay)
Norway	1
Great Britain	4
Paris, France (clay)
Hungary	4
France	1
Stockholm, Sweden (clay)
Sweden	5
Switzerland	0
Dublin, Ireland (grass)
Ireland	2
Denmark	3
Zagreb, Yugoslavia
Yugoslavia	2
Italy	3
Prague, Czechoslovakia
Czechoslovakia	4
Brazil	1
Brussels, Belgium
Belgium	3
Argentina	2

Quarterfinals; 10–14 June
Birmingham, England (grass)
Netherlands	1
Great Britain	4
Budapest, Hungary (clay)
Hungary	2
Sweden	3
Turin, Italy (clay)
Denmark	0
Italy	5
Prague, Czechoslovakia
Czechoslovakia	3
Belgium	2

Semifinals; 9–11 July
Stockholm, Sweden (clay)
Great Britain	1
Sweden	4
Milan, Italy (clay)
Italy	2
Czechoslovakia	3

Final; 27–29 July
Prague, Czechoslovakia (clay)
Sweden	1
Czechoslovakia	4

== First round ==
=== Great Britain vs. India ===
Great Britain
3
Royal Hall Grounds, Harrogate, England
22–24 April 1948
Clay

India
2

			1	2	3	4	5
1	(United Kingdom) (India)	Howard Walton; Dilip Bose	3; 6	3; 6	2; 6
2	(United Kingdom) (India)	Tony Mottram; Sumant Misra	6; 0	6; 3	7; 9	7; 5
3	(United Kingdom) (India)	Tony Mottram / Geoffrey Paish; Sumant Misra / Subba Sawhney	6; 3	7; 5	6; 2
4	(United Kingdom) (India)	Tony Mottram; Dilip Bose	6; 3	6; 4	6; 4
5	(United Kingdom) (India)	Howard Walton; Sumant Misra	6; 2	6; 8	7; 9	2; 6

=== Hungary vs. Austria ===
Hungary
5
Budapest, Hungary
29 April–1 May 1948

Austria
0

			1	2	3	4	5
1	(Hungary) (Austria)	András Ádám-Stolpa; Hans Redl	6; 3	4; 6	6; 4	4; 6	6; 3
2	(Hungary) (Austria)	József Asbóth; Gustav Specht	6; 2	6; 2	6; 0
3	(Hungary) (Austria)	József Asbóth / Kálmán Fehér; Hans Redl / Gustav Specht	6; 2	6; 3	8; 6
4	(Hungary) (Austria)	József Asbóth; Hans Redl	6; 4	6; 2	6; 2
5	(Hungary) (Austria)	András Ádám-Stolpa; Gustav Specht	4; 6	6; 0	6; 1	4; 6	6; 3

=== Romania vs. France ===
Romania
2
Bucharest, Romania
1–3 May 1948
Clay

France
3

			1	2	3	4	5
1	(Romania) (France)	Gheorghe Viziru; Bernard Destremau	6; 3	6; 2	7; 5
2	(Romania) (France)	Cristea Caralulis; Marcel Bernard	3; 6	6; 4	6; 3	6; 2
3	(Romania) (France)	Cristea Caralulis / Gheorghe Viziru; Marcel Bernard / Henri Bolelli	3; 6	6; 8	6; 8
4	(Romania) (France)	Cristea Caralulis; Bernard Destremau	2; 6	4; 6	5; 7
5	(Romania) (France)	Gheorghe Viziru; Marcel Bernard	2; 6	1; 6	4; 6

=== Spain vs. Sweden ===
Spain
0
Real Club de Tenis Barcelona, Barcelona, Spain
1–3 May 1948
Clay

Sweden
4

			1	2	3	4	5
1	(Spain) (Sweden)	Pedro Castella; Torsten Johansson	3; 6	2; 6	1; 6
2	(Spain) (Sweden)	Mario Szavoszt; Lennart Bergelin	4; 6	2; 6	6; 4	3; 6
3	(Spain) (Sweden)	Jaime Bartroli / Mario Szavoszt; Lennart Bergelin / Torsten Johansson	5; 7	4; 6	4; 6
4	(Spain) (Sweden)	Mario Szavoszt; Torsten Johansson	3; 6	9; 11	3; 6
5	(Spain) (Sweden)	Pedro Castella; Lennart Bergelin						not played

=== Switzerland vs. Pakistan ===
Switzerland
3
Montreux, Switzerland
30 April–2 May 1948

Pakistan
2

			1	2	3	4	5
1	(Switzerland) (Pakistan)	Max Albrecht; Mahmoud Alam	6; 1	6; 1	6; 2
2	(Switzerland) (Pakistan)	Hans Huonder; Khan-Iftikhar Ahmed	2; 6	4; 6	3; 6
3	(Switzerland) (Pakistan)	Max Albrecht / Hans Huonder; Khan-Iftikhar Ahmed / Mahmoud Alam	7; 5	6; 4	6; 4
4	(Switzerland) (Pakistan)	Hans Huonder; Mahmoud Alam	6; 1	6; 1	6; 2
5	(Switzerland) (Pakistan)	Max Albrecht; Khan-Iftikhar Ahmed	1; 6	5; 7	6; 1	6; 4	4; 6

=== Ireland vs. Luxembourg ===
Ireland
5
Fitzwilliam Lawn Tennis Club, Dublin, Ireland
1–3 May 1948
Grass

Luxembourg
0

			1	2	3	4	5
1	(Republic of Ireland) (Luxembourg)	Cyril Kemp; Gaston Wampach	7; 5	6; 3	6; 8	6; 4
2	(Republic of Ireland) (Luxembourg)	Guy Jackson; Géza Wertheim	7; 5	6; 1	6; 1
3	(Republic of Ireland) (Luxembourg)	Cyril Kemp / George McVeagh; Gaston Wampach / Géza Wertheim	10; 8	6; 4	6; 3
4	(Republic of Ireland) (Luxembourg)	Guy Jackson; Gaston Wampach	5; 7	6; 4	6; 2	6; 0
5	(Republic of Ireland) (Luxembourg)	Cyril Kemp; Géza Wertheim	6; 0	6; 2	6; 4

=== Denmark vs. Egypt ===
Denmark
3
Copenhagen, Denmark
3–5 May 1948
Clay

Egypt
2

			1	2	3	4	5
1	(Denmark) (Egypt)	Torben Ulrich; Adli El Shafei	6; 1	7; 5	5; 7	5; 7	8; 6
2	(Denmark) (Egypt)	Kurt Nielsen; Andre Najar	3; 6	6; 2	6; 2	6; 3
3	(Denmark) (Egypt)	Kurt Nielsen / Torben Ulrich; Marcel Coen / Adli El Shafei	5; 7	8; 6	8; 6	4; 6	3; 6
4	(Denmark) (Egypt)	Kurt Nielsen; Adli El Shafei	6; 3	6; 1	8; 6
5	(Denmark) (Egypt)	Torben Ulrich; Marcel Coen	6; 2	1; 6	10; 8	10; 12	0; 6

=== Turkey vs. Yugoslavia ===
Turkey
0
Istanbul, Turkey
30 April–2 May 1948

Yugoslavia
5

			1	2	3	4	5
1	(Turkey) (Socialist Federal Republic of Yugoslavia)	Suzan Gürel; Dragutin Mitić	1; 6	1; 6	0; 6
2	(Turkey) (Socialist Federal Republic of Yugoslavia)	Fehmi Kızıl; Josip Palada	1; 6	6; 1	6; 8	3; 6
3	(Turkey) (Socialist Federal Republic of Yugoslavia)	Fehmi Kızıl / Cihat Özgenel; Dragutin Mitić / Josip Palada	2; 6	3; 6	3; 6
4	(Turkey) (Socialist Federal Republic of Yugoslavia)	Suzan Gürel; Josip Palada	4; 6	2; 6
5	(Turkey) (Socialist Federal Republic of Yugoslavia)	Beliğ Beler; Stefan Laslo	2; 6	4; 6

== Second round ==
=== Netherlands vs. Portugal ===
Netherlands
5
Scheveningen, Netherlands
6–8 May 1948
Clay

Portugal
0

			1	2	3	4	5
1	(Netherlands) (Portugal)	Hans van Swol; José Roquette	6; 0	6; 3	6; 2
2	(Netherlands) (Portugal)	Boebi van Meegeren; Eduardo Ricciardi	6; 2	6; 1	6; 1
3	(Netherlands) (Portugal)	Ivo Rinkel / Hans van Swol; Eduardo Ricciardi / José da Silva	6; 1	6; 0	6; 3
4	(Netherlands) (Portugal)	Hans van Swol; Eduardo Ricciardi	6; 4	6; 2	6; 4
5	(Netherlands) (Portugal)	Boebi van Meegeren; José Roquette	6; 1	6; 1	6; 3

=== Norway vs. Great Britain ===
Norway
1
Oslo, Norway
11–13 May 1948
Clay

Great Britain
4

			1	2	3	4	5
1	(Norway) (United Kingdom)	Johan Haanes; Geoffrey Paish	6; 2	4; 6	6; 3	6; 2
2	(Norway) (United Kingdom)	Jan Staubo; Tony Mottram	2; 6	1; 6	1; 6
3	(Norway) (United Kingdom)	Johan Haanes / Jan Staubo; Henry Billington / Tony Mottram	1; 6	5; 7	3; 6
4	(Norway) (United Kingdom)	Jan Staubo; Geoffrey Paish	6; 4	4; 6	1; 6	2; 6
5	(Norway) (United Kingdom)	Johan Haanes; Tony Mottram	1; 6	0; 6	7; 5	1; 6

=== France vs. Hungary ===
France
1
Stade Roland Garros, Paris, France
15–17 May 1948
Clay

Hungary
4

			1	2	3	4	5
1	(France) (Hungary)	Marcel Bernard; József Asbóth	6; 1	6; 4	4; 6	6; 2
2	(France) (Hungary)	Robert Abdesselam; András Ádám-Stolpa	6; 2	4; 6	3; 6	6; 8
3	(France) (Hungary)	Marcel Bernard / Bernard Destremau; András Ádám-Stolpa / József Asbóth	3; 6	3; 6	8; 6	6; 2	2; 6
4	(France) (Hungary)	Robert Abdesselam; József Asbóth	5; 7	1; 6	2; 6
5	(France) (Hungary)	Marcel Bernard; András Ádám-Stolpa	6; 1	6; 3	0; 6	3; 6	4; 6

=== Sweden vs. Switzerland ===
Sweden
5
Tennisstadion, Stockholm, Sweden
15–17 May 1948
Clay

Switzerland
0

			1	2	3	4	5
1	(Sweden) (Switzerland)	Lennart Bergelin; Max Albrecht	7; 5	6; 3	6; 3
2	(Sweden) (Switzerland)	Torsten Johansson; Hans Huonder	6; 2	6; 4	6; 3
3	(Sweden) (Switzerland)	Lennart Bergelin / Torsten Johansson; Max Albrecht / Hans Huonder	6; 1	6; 1	6; 3
4	(Sweden) (Switzerland)	Torsten Johansson; Max Albrecht	11; 9	0; 6	6; 2	6; 4
5	(Sweden) (Switzerland)	Lennart Bergelin; Hans Huonder	6; 2	6; 4	6; 1

=== Ireland vs. Denmark ===
Ireland
2
Fitzwilliam Lawn Tennis Club, Dublin, Ireland
15–18 May 1948
Grass

Denmark
3

			1	2	3	4	5
1	(Republic of Ireland) (Denmark)	Cyril Kemp; Torben Ulrich	6; 8	3; 6	4; 6
2	(Republic of Ireland) (Denmark)	Guy Jackson; Kurt Nielsen	4; 6	6; 2	4; 6	7; 5	4; 6
3	(Republic of Ireland) (Denmark)	Guy Jackson / Cyril Kemp; Kurt Nielsen / Torben Ulrich	6; 0	6; 3	6; 8	3; 6	6; 2
4	(Republic of Ireland) (Denmark)	Cyril Kemp; Kurt Nielsen	4; 6	6; 8	3; 6
5	(Republic of Ireland) (Denmark)	Guy Jackson; Torben Ulrich	6; 4	6; 8	2; 6	6; 2	6; 3

=== Yugoslavia vs. Italy ===
Yugoslavia
2
Zagreb, Yugoslavia
14–16 May 1948

Italy
3

			1	2	3	4	5
1	(Socialist Federal Republic of Yugoslavia) (Italy)	Dragutin Mitić; Giovanni Cucelli	5; 7	8; 6	6; 1	6; 2
2	(Socialist Federal Republic of Yugoslavia) (Italy)	Josip Palada; Marcello del Bello	2; 6	3; 6	8; 6	7; 9
3	(Socialist Federal Republic of Yugoslavia) (Italy)	Dragutin Mitić / Josip Palada; Marcello del Bello / Giovanni Cucelli	0; 6	3; 6	6; 1	5; 7
4	(Socialist Federal Republic of Yugoslavia) (Italy)	Dragutin Mitić; Marcello del Bello	5; 7	4; 6	6; 8
5	(Socialist Federal Republic of Yugoslavia) (Italy)	Josip Palada; Giovanni Cucelli	5; 7	6; 4	6; 1	6; 4

=== Czechoslovakia vs. Brazil ===
Czechoslovakia
4
Prague, Czechoslovakia
14–16 May 1948

Brazil
1

			1	2	3	4	5
1	(Czechoslovakia) (Brazil)	Jaroslav Drobný; Ernesto Petersen	6; 2	6; 2	6; 2
2	(Czechoslovakia) (Brazil)	Ferdinand Vrba; Manoel Fernandes	2; 6	4; 6	3; 6
3	(Czechoslovakia) (Brazil)	Jaroslav Drobný / Vladimír Zábrodský; Manoel Fernandes / Ernesto Petersen	6; 3	6; 4	6; 0
4	(Czechoslovakia) (Brazil)	Ferdinand Vrba; Ernesto Petersen	7; 9	6; 3	6; 4	6; 3
5	(Czechoslovakia) (Brazil)	Jaroslav Drobný; Manoel Fernandes	6; 0	4; 1				retired

=== Belgium vs. Argentina ===
Belgium
3
Brussels, Belgium
15–17 May 1948

Argentina
2

			1	2	3	4	5
1	(Belgium) (Argentina)	Jacques Peten; Heraldo Weiss	6; 1	1; 6	6; 2	6; 3
2	(Belgium) (Argentina)	Philippe Washer; Enrique Morea	6; 1	7; 5	6; 2
3	(Belgium) (Argentina)	Jacques Peten / Philippe Washer; Enrique Morea / Alejo Russell	10; 8	3; 6	2; 6	6; 8
4	(Belgium) (Argentina)	Jacques Peten; Enrique Morea	6; 1	6; 3	6; 8	4; 6	8; 10
5	(Belgium) (Argentina)	Philippe Washer; Heraldo Weiss	8; 6	4; 6	6; 4	6; 4

== Quarterfinals ==
=== Great Britain vs. Netherlands ===
Great Britain
4
Edgbaston Lawn Tennis Club, Birmingham, England
10–12 June 1948
Grass

Netherlands
1

			1	2	3	4	5
1	(United Kingdom) (Netherlands)	Tony Mottram; Hans van Swol	6; 3	6; 4	9; 11	6; 3
2	(United Kingdom) (Netherlands)	Geoffrey Paish; Boebi van Meegeren	6; 3	6; 2	3; 6	7; 9	6; 1
3	(United Kingdom) (Netherlands)	Tony Mottram / Geoffrey Paish; Ivo Rinkel / Hans van Swol	3; 6	7; 5	2; 6	6; 1	4; 6
4	(United Kingdom) (Netherlands)	Geoffrey Paish; Hans van Swol	6; 1	2; 6	7; 5	1; 6	6; 4
5	(United Kingdom) (Netherlands)	Tony Mottram; Boebi van Meegeren	6; 3	6; 4	6; 3

=== Hungary vs. Sweden ===
Hungary
2
Budapest, Hungary
11–14 June 1948
Clay

Sweden
3

			1	2	3	4	5
1	(Hungary) (Sweden)	András Ádám-Stolpa; Lennart Bergelin	7; 5	4; 6	2; 6	1; 6
2	(Hungary) (Sweden)	József Asbóth; Torsten Johansson	3; 6	9; 7	6; 4	6; 0
3	(Hungary) (Sweden)	András Ádám-Stolpa / József Asbóth; Lennart Bergelin / Torsten Johansson	7; 5	3; 6	5; 7	5; 7
4	(Hungary) (Sweden)	András Ádám-Stolpa; Torsten Johansson	5; 7	1; 6	4; 6
5	(Hungary) (Sweden)	József Asbóth; Lennart Bergelin	6; 4	6; 3	6; 4

=== Italy vs. Denmark ===
Italy
5
Turin, Italy
11–13 June 1948
Clay

Denmark
0

			1	2	3	4	5
1	(Italy) (Denmark)	Giovanni Cucelli; Kurt Nielsen	6; 4	4; 6	6; 1	6; 1
2	(Italy) (Denmark)	Marcello del Bello; Torben Ulrich	6; 3	6; 3	6; 3
3	(Italy) (Denmark)	Marcello del Bello / Giovanni Cucelli; Kurt Nielsen / Torben Ulrich	6; 2	6; 3	8; 6
4	(Italy) (Denmark)	Giovanni Cucelli; Torben Ulrich	6; 3	6; 3	6; 1
5	(Italy) (Denmark)	Marcello del Bello; Kurt Nielsen	6; 2	7; 5	6; 3

=== Czechoslovakia vs. Belgium ===
Czechoslovakia
3
Prague, Czechoslovakia
11–13 June 1948

Belgium
2

			1	2	3	4	5
1	(Czechoslovakia) (Belgium)	Jaroslav Drobný; Jacques Peten	6; 4	6; 3	6; 1
2	(Czechoslovakia) (Belgium)	Vladimír Černík; Philippe Washer	4; 6	6; 2	4; 6	3; 6
3	(Czechoslovakia) (Belgium)	Vladimír Černík / Jaroslav Drobný; Pierre Geelhand de Merxem / Philippe Washer	7; 5	4; 6	6; 1	6; 3
4	(Czechoslovakia) (Belgium)	Vladimír Černík; Jacques Peten	4; 6	6; 2	1; 6	4; 6
5	(Czechoslovakia) (Belgium)	Jaroslav Drobný; Philippe Washer	6; 2	6; 4	6; 2

== Semifinals ==
=== Sweden vs. Great Britain ===
Sweden
4
Tennisstadion, Stockholm, Sweden
9–11 July 1948
Clay

Great Britain
1

			1	2	3	4	5
1	(Sweden) (United Kingdom)	Lennart Bergelin; Tony Mottram	6; 3	6; 2	6; 3
2	(Sweden) (United Kingdom)	Torsten Johansson; Geoffrey Paish	6; 2	2; 6	8; 6	6; 1
3	(Sweden) (United Kingdom)	Lennart Bergelin / Torsten Johansson; Tony Mottram / Geoffrey Paish	2; 6	7; 5	6; 4	6; 3
4	(Sweden) (United Kingdom)	Torsten Johansson; Tony Mottram	3; 6	6; 2	2; 6	2; 6
5	(Sweden) (United Kingdom)	Lennart Bergelin; Geoffrey Paish	4; 6	6; 4	6; 1	6; 2

=== Italy vs. Czechoslovakia ===
Italy
2
Milan, Italy
9–11 July 1948
Clay

Czechoslovakia
3

			1	2	3	4	5
1	(Italy) (Czechoslovakia)	Giovanni Cucelli; Jaroslav Drobný	3; 6	6; 3	2; 6	3; 6
2	(Italy) (Czechoslovakia)	Marcello del Bello; Vladimír Černík	2; 6	4; 6	9; 7	3; 6
3	(Italy) (Czechoslovakia)	Marcello del Bello / Giovanni Cucelli; Vladimír Černík / Jaroslav Drobný	6; 1	8; 6	6; 2
4	(Italy) (Czechoslovakia)	Marcello del Bello; Jaroslav Drobný	9; 11	3; 6	2; 6
5	(Italy) (Czechoslovakia)	Giovanni Cucelli; Vladimír Černík	6; 2	2; 6	6; 3	6; 3

== Final ==
=== Czechoslovakia vs. Sweden ===
Czechoslovakia
4
Prague, Czechoslovakia
27–29 July 1948
Clay

Sweden
1

			1	2	3	4	5
1	(Czechoslovakia) (Sweden)	Vladimír Černík; Torsten Johansson	6; 4	4; 6	6; 3	6; 3
2	(Czechoslovakia) (Sweden)	Jaroslav Drobný; Lennart Bergelin	6; 0	6; 3	7; 5
3	(Czechoslovakia) (Sweden)	Vladimír Černík / Jaroslav Drobný; Lennart Bergelin / Torsten Johansson	6; 2	6; 1	6; 2
4	(Czechoslovakia) (Sweden)	Vladimír Zábrodský; Torsten Johansson	3; 6	6; 3	2; 6	3; 6
5	(Czechoslovakia) (Sweden)	Ferdinand Vrba; Börje Fornstedt	6; 3	6; 1	6; 3
