= 1948 Wimbledon Championships – Mixed doubles =

Mixed doubles
- 1948 Wimbledon Championships

Final
- Champions: (Australia) John Bromwich (United States) Louise Brough
- Runners-up: (Australia) Frank Sedgman (United States) Doris Hart
- Score: 6–2, 3–6, 6–3

Details
- Draw: 80 (5Q)
- Seeds: 4

Events
Singles	men	women		boys	girls
Doubles	men	women	mixed	boys	girls
- Wimbledon Championships

John Bromwich and Louise Brough successfully defended their title, defeating Frank Sedgman and Doris Hart in the final, 6–2, 3–6, 6–3 to win the mixed doubles tennis title at the 1948 Wimbledon Championships.

== Seeds ==
1. (Australia) John Bromwich / (United States) Louise Brough (champions)
2. (United States) Tom Brown / (United States) Margaret Osborne (semifinals)
3. (Czechoslovakia) Jaroslav Drobný / (United States) Pat Todd (semifinals)
4. (Australia) Frank Sedgman / (United States) Doris Hart (final)

Click on the seed number of a player to go to their draw section.

== Draw ==
Key

- Q = Qualifier
- WC = Wild card
- LL = Lucky loser
- Alt = Alternate
- ITF = ITF entry
- PR = Protected ranking
- SR = Special ranking
- SE = Special exempt
- JE = Junior exempt
- JR = Junior Accelerator Programme entrant
- CO = College Accelerator Programme entrant
- NG = Next Gen Accelerator Program entrant
- w/o = Walkover
- r = Retired
- d = Defaulted

=== Finals ===
Quarterfinals
2	(United States) Tom Brown (United States) Margaret duPont	4	6	6
(United Kingdom) Tony Mottram (United Kingdom) Jean Bostock	6	4	3
4	(Australia) Frank Sedgman (United States) Doris Hart	3	7	6
(Sweden) Lennart Bergelin (France) Nelly Landry	6	5	3
(United Kingdom) Don Butler (United Kingdom) Kay Menzies	2	3
3	(Czechoslovakia) Jaroslav Drobný (United States) Pat Todd	6	6
(United States) John Wilkinson (United States) Mary Prentiss	3	1
1	(Australia) John Bromwich (United States) Louise Brough	6	6

Semifinals
2	(United States) Tom Brown (United States) Margaret duPont	4	6	3
4	(Australia) Frank Sedgman (United States) Doris Hart	6	3	6
3	(Czechoslovakia) Jaroslav Drobný (United States) Pat Todd	7	1	6
1	(Australia) John Bromwich (United States) Louise Brough	5	6	8

Final
4	(Australia) Frank Sedgman (United States) Doris Hart	2	6	3
1	(Australia) John Bromwich (United States) Louise Brough	6	3	6

=== Top half ===
==== Section 1 ====
First round

Second round
2	(United States) Tom Brown (United States) Margaret duPont	6	6
(United Kingdom) David Mockridge (United Kingdom) Kay Tuckey	0	1
(Republic of Ireland) Guy Jackson (Republic of Ireland) Mary Fitzgibbon	6	6
(United Kingdom) Derek Bull (United Kingdom) Betty Wilford	4	3
(Hungary) József Asbóth (Hungary) Zsuzsa Körmöczy	6	6
(Italy) Ferruccio Quintavalle (Italy) Annelise Bossi	2	3
(Argentina) Heraldo Weiss (United States) Helen Rihbany	7	6
(South Africa) Walter Musgrove (United States) Mary Belin	5	2

Third round
2	(United States) T Brown (United States) M duPont	6	6
(Republic of Ireland) G Jackson (Republic of Ireland) M Fitzgibbon	4	4
(Hungary) J Asbóth (Hungary) Z Körmöczy	w/o
(Argentina) H Weiss (United States) H Rihbany

Fourth round
2	(United States) T Brown (United States) M duPont	6	6
(Argentina) H Weiss (United States) H Rihbany	2	3

==== Section 2 ====
First round

Second round
(South Africa) Eric Sturgess (South Africa) Sheila Summers	6	6
(France) Paul Rémy (France) Ginette Jucker	4	2
(United Kingdom) Geoffrey Paish (United Kingdom) Joy Gannon	6	6
(United Kingdom) Howard Walton (United Kingdom) Wendy Stork	2	4
(Switzerland) Edgar Büchi (Czechoslovakia) Edith Sutz	9	6
Q	(United Kingdom) Freddie Della Porta (United Kingdom) Peggy Knight	7	4
(United Kingdom) Tony Mottram (United Kingdom) Jean Bostock	6	6
(Denmark) Kurt Nielsen (Denmark) Lisa Andersen	1	3

Third round
(South Africa) E Sturgess (South Africa) S Summers	6	6
(United Kingdom) G Paish (United Kingdom) J Gannon	0	3
(Switzerland) E Büchi (Czechoslovakia) E Sutz	1	4
(United Kingdom) A Mottram (United Kingdom) J Bostock	6	6

Fourth round
(South Africa) E Sturgess (South Africa) S Summers	2	6	5
(United Kingdom) A Mottram (United Kingdom) J Bostock	6	1	7

==== Section 3 ====
First round

Second round
4	(Australia) Frank Sedgman (United States) Doris Hart	6	6
(Austria) Hans Redl (Austria) Hilde Doleschell	3	2
(Italy) Marcello del Bello (United Kingdom) Effie Peters	w/o
(Netherlands) Ivo Rinkel (United Kingdom) Jean Quertier
(United Kingdom) Roland Morton (United Kingdom) Patsy O'Connel	3	3
(Republic of Ireland) George McVeagh (United Kingdom) Gay Chandler	6	6
Q	(United Kingdom) Ted Urlwin-Smith (United Kingdom) Peggy Urlwin-Smith	2	3
(United Kingdom) Peter Hare (United Kingdom) Audrey Osborne	6	6

Third round
4	(Australia) F Sedgman (United States) D Hart	6	6
(Netherlands) I Rinkel (United Kingdom) J Quertier	2	0
(Republic of Ireland) George McVeagh (United Kingdom) G Chandler	3	7	6
(United Kingdom) P Hare (United Kingdom) A Osborne	6	5	2

Fourth round
4	(Australia) F Sedgman (United States) D Hart	6	6
(Republic of Ireland) George McVeagh (United Kingdom) G Chandler	2	3

==== Section 4 ====
First round
(Socialist Federal Republic of Yugoslavia) Franjo Kukuljević (United States) Gloria Butler	3	6	1
(United Kingdom) Cliff Hovell (United Kingdom) Mary Halford	6	3	6
(United Kingdom) Headley Baxter (United Kingdom) Vera Thomas	6	2	5
(Czechoslovakia) Vladimír Černík (Czechoslovakia) Olga Mišková	4	6	7
(Argentina) Enrique Morea (Argentina) Mary Terán de Weiss	0	3
(Australia) Jack Harper (United Kingdom) Billie Yorke	6	6
(Republic of Ireland) Matthew Murphy (Republic of Ireland) Roguie Bain	6	7	3
(Australia) John Spence (United Kingdom) Billie Woodgate	4	9	6
(Sweden) Lennart Bergelin (France) Nelly Landry	7	6
(India) Subba Sawhney (United Kingdom) Gem Hoahing	5	2
(United Kingdom) Ralph Nichols (United Kingdom) Betty Passingham	6	6
(France) Christian Grandet (Netherlands) Madzy Couquerque	2	2
(United Kingdom) Jimmy Jones (United Kingdom) Ermyntrude Harvey	3	4
(United Kingdom) Gerry Oakley (United Kingdom) Patsy Rodgers	6	6
(France) Robert Abdesselam (Luxembourg) Alice Weiwers	6	6
(Norway) Johan Haanes (Norway) Laila Schou Nilsen	4	3

Second round
(United Kingdom) C Hovell (United Kingdom) M Halford	2	6
(Czechoslovakia) V Černík (Czechoslovakia) O Mišková	6	8
(Australia) J Harper (United Kingdom) A Yorke	w/o
(Australia) J Spence (United Kingdom) R Woodgate
(Sweden) L Bergelin (France) N Landry	2	6	6
(United Kingdom) R Nichols (United Kingdom) E Passingham	6	2	3
(United Kingdom) G Oakley (United Kingdom) P Rodgers	6	6
(France) R Abdesselam (Luxembourg) A Weiwers	3	4

Third round
(Czechoslovakia) V Černík (Czechoslovakia) O Mišková	7	6
(Australia) J Spence (United Kingdom) R Woodgate	5	3
(Sweden) L Bergelin (France) N Landry	1	6	6
(United Kingdom) G Oakley (United Kingdom) P Rodgers	6	1	3

Fourth round
(Czechoslovakia) V Černík (Czechoslovakia) O Mišková	3	6	5
(Sweden) L Bergelin (France) N Landry	6	3	7

=== Bottom half ===
==== Section 5 ====
First round
(Republic of Ireland) RJ McCabe (Republic of Ireland) Maeve Brennan	3	3
(Netherlands) Boebi van Meegeren (Netherlands) Tineke Lubbers-Fischer	6	6
(Romania) Alexandru Hamburger (United Kingdom) Georgie Woodgate	6	2	2
(India) Dilip Bose (United Kingdom) Jean Walker-Smith	4	6	6
(United Kingdom) John Fulton (United Kingdom) Lesley Fulton	3	4
(Poland) Czesław Spychała (United Kingdom) Bea Carris	6	6
(United Kingdom) Don Butler (United Kingdom) Kay Menzies	3	8	6
(Hungary) Zoltán Katona (Hungary) Márta Peterdy	6	6	4
(Egypt) Marcel Coen (Belgium) Miriamme de Borman	4	7	9
(Netherlands) Hans van Swol (South Africa) Dorothy Muller	6	5	7
(United Kingdom) Paddy Roberts (United Kingdom) Joan Curry	10	6
(United States) Bill Robertson (United States) Rita Anderson	8	3
(United Kingdom) Roland Carter (United States) Margaret Cary	w/o
(United Kingdom) Guy Cooper (United Kingdom) Valerie Cooper
(Poland) Ernest Wittmann (United Kingdom) Edith Middleton	3	3
(United Kingdom) Claude Lister (United Kingdom) Thelma Lister	6	6

Second round
(Netherlands) R van Meegeren (Netherlands) T Lubbers-Fischer	2	3
(India) D Bose (United Kingdom) J Walker-Smith	6	6
(Poland) C Spychała (United Kingdom) B Carris	3	10	4
(United Kingdom) D Butler (United Kingdom) K Menzies	6	8	6
(Egypt) M Coen (Belgium) M de Borman	5	3
(United Kingdom) A Roberts (United Kingdom) J Curry	7	6
(United Kingdom) G Cooper (United Kingdom) V Cooper	5	6	6
(United Kingdom) C Lister (United Kingdom) T Lister	7	4	3

Third round
(India) D Bose (United Kingdom) J Walker-Smith	2	1
(United Kingdom) D Butler (United Kingdom) K Menzies	6	6
(United Kingdom) A Roberts (United Kingdom) J Curry	6	8
(United Kingdom) G Cooper (United Kingdom) V Cooper	2	6

Fourth round
(United Kingdom) D Butler (United Kingdom) K Menzies	8	6
(United Kingdom) A Roberts (United Kingdom) J Curry	6	2

==== Section 6 ====
First round

Second round
Q	(United Kingdom) Bobby Thorn (United Kingdom) Viola White	1	3
(United Kingdom) Bobby Meredith (United Kingdom) Elsa Haylock	6	6
(Belgium) Jack Van den Eynde (Belgium) Josane de Meulemeester	3	6	8
(Sweden) Borje Fornstedt (Netherlands) Nel Hermsen	6	3	6
(United Kingdom) Dennis Slack (United Kingdom) Peggy Dawson-Scott	5	2
(France) Jean Borotra (France) Colette Boegner	7	6
(United Kingdom) Henry Billington (United Kingdom) Susan Billington	0	7	2
3	(Czechoslovakia) Jaroslav Drobný (United States) Pat Todd	6	5	6

Third round
(United Kingdom) G Meredith (United Kingdom) E Haylock	4	3
(Belgium) J Van den Eynde (Belgium) J de Meulemeester	6	6
(France) J Borotra (France) C Boegner	0	3
3	(Czechoslovakia) J Drobný (United States) P Todd	6	6

Fourth round
(Belgium) J Van den Eynde (Belgium) J de Meulemeester	w/o
3	(Czechoslovakia) J Drobný (United States) P Todd

==== Section 7 ====
First round

Second round
(United Kingdom) Colin Ritchie (United Kingdom) Barbara Knapp	1	3
(Belgium) Philippe Washer (United States) Shirley Fry	6	6
(Argentina) Alejo Russell (United Kingdom) Betty Hilton	5	6	3
(Republic of Ireland) Cyril Kemp (Republic of Ireland) Betty Lombard	7	2	6
(United Kingdom) Norman Kitovitz (Kenya) Sheila Dowdeswell	2	4
(United States) John Wilkinson (United States) Mary Prentiss	6	6
(France) Jacques Brugnon (Netherlands) Truid Blaisse-Terwindt	6	6
(United Kingdom) Herman David (United Kingdom) Nancy Glover	3	4

Third round
(Belgium) P Washer (United States) S Fry	6	6
(Republic of Ireland) C Kemp (Republic of Ireland) E Lombard	2	3
(United States) J Wilkinson (United States) M Prentiss	6	6
(France) J Brugnon (Netherlands) G Blaisse-Terwindt	1	1

Fourth round
(Belgium) P Washer (United States) S Fry	w/o
(United States) J Wilkinson (United States) M Prentiss

==== Section 8 ====
First round

Second round
(United Kingdom) Tim Lewis (United Kingdom) Pam Bocquet	6	6
(United Kingdom) Norman Blair (United Kingdom) Molly Blair	2	1
(United States) William Young (United States) Argyll Rice	6	6
(United Kingdom) GI Bayley (United Kingdom) Edna Pool	2	4
(New Zealand) Dennis Coombe (United Kingdom) Natalie Zinovieff	4	2
(Australia) Harry Hopman (United States) Barbara Scofield	6	6
(Egypt) Eddie Mandelbaum (Lebanon) Vera Mattar	2	1
1	(Australia) John Bromwich (United States) Louise Brough	6	6

Third round
(United Kingdom) N Lewis (United Kingdom) P Bocquet	6	6
(United States) W Young (United States) A Rice	1	4
(Australia) H Hopman (United States) B Scofield	3	3
1	(Australia) J Bromwich (United States) L Brough	6	6

Fourth round
(United Kingdom) N Lewis (United Kingdom) P Bocquet	1	3
1	(Australia) J Bromwich (United States) L Brough	6	6
