= 1948 Wimbledon Championships – Men's singles =

Men's singles
- 1948 Wimbledon Championships

Final
- Champion: (United States) Bob Falkenburg
- Runner-up: (Australia) John Bromwich
- Score: 7–5, 0–6, 6–2, 3–6, 7–5

Details
- Draw: 128 (10Q)
- Seeds: 8

Events
Singles	men	women		boys	girls
Doubles	men	women	mixed	boys	girls
- Wimbledon Championships

Bob Falkenburg defeated John Bromwich in the final 7–5, 0–6, 6–2, 3–6, 7–5 to win the gentlemen's singles tennis title at the 1948 Wimbledon Championships. He saved three championship points en route to the title, in the final set.

Jack Kramer was the reigning champion, but was ineligible to compete after turning professional at the end of the 1947 season.

== Seeds ==
1. (United States) Frank Parker (fourth round)
2. (Australia) John Bromwich (final)
3. (United States) Gardnar Mulloy (semifinals)
4. (United States) Tom Brown (quarterfinals)
5. (Czechoslovakia) Jaroslav Drobný (second round)
6. (United States) Budge Patty (quarterfinals)
7. (United States) Bob Falkenburg (champion)
8. (South Africa) Eric Sturgess (fourth round)

Click on the seed number of a player to go to their draw section.

== Draw ==
Key

- Q = Qualifier
- WC = Wild card
- LL = Lucky loser
- Alt = Alternate
- ITF = ITF entry
- PR = Protected ranking
- SR = Special ranking
- SE = Special exempt
- JE = Junior exempt
- JR = Junior Accelerator Programme entrant
- CO = College Accelerator Programme entrant
- NG = Next Gen Accelerator Program entrant
- w/o = Walkover
- r = Retired
- d = Defaulted

=== Finals ===
Quarterfinals
2	(Australia) John Bromwich	6	7	6
6	(United States) Budge Patty	4	5	1
4	(United States) Tom Brown	6	3	6	1	1
(Hungary) József Asbóth	4	6	4	6	6
(United Kingdom) Tony Mottram	2	6	5	1
3	(United States) Gardnar Mulloy	6	1	7	6
7	(United States) Bob Falkenburg	6	6	3	6
(Sweden) Lennart Bergelin	4	2	6	4

Semifinals
2	(Australia) John Bromwich	6	14	6
(Hungary) József Asbóth	3	12	2
3	(United States) Gardnar Mulloy	4	4	6
7	(United States) Bob Falkenburg	6	6	8

Final
2	(Australia) John Bromwich	5	6	2	6	5
7	(United States) Bob Falkenburg	7	0	6	3	7

=== Top half ===
==== Section 1 ====
First round
2	(Australia) John Bromwich	6	6	8
(Belgium) Jack Van den Eynde	2	4	6
(Hungary) Zoltán Katona	6	6	2	2	2
(Republic of Ireland) Guy Jackson	4	4	6	6	6
(United Kingdom) Douglas Snart	3	6	6	6
Q	(United Kingdom) Clive Bernstein	6	1	1	3
(Italy) Ferruccio Quintavalle	2	1	2
(Czechoslovakia) Vladimír Černík	6	6	6
(Netherlands) Hans van Swol	9	6	3	2	6
(Poland) Czesław Spychała	7	3	6	6	2
(Spain) Jaime Bartrolí	1	0	1
(Philippines) Felicisimo Ampon	6	6	6
(United Kingdom) Francis Wallis	6	2	3
(United Kingdom) Roland Carter	8	6	6
(India) Narendra Nath	6	6	6
(Egypt) Andre Najar	4	2	1

Second round
2	(Australia) J Bromwich	6	6	6
(Republic of Ireland) G Jackson	0	0	2
(United Kingdom) D Snart	5	4	2
(Czechoslovakia) V Černík	7	6	6
(Netherlands) A van Swol	8	6	7
(Philippines) F Ampon	6	2	5
(United Kingdom) R Carter	1	1	1
(India) N Nath	6	6	6

Third round
2	(Australia) J Bromwich	6	6	6
(Czechoslovakia) V Černík	4	1	2
(Netherlands) A van Swol	8	1	6	6
(India) N Nath	6	6	3	1

Fourth round
2	(Australia) J Bromwich	6	6	6
(Netherlands) A van Swol	4	3	4

==== Section 2 ====
First round
6	(United States) Budge Patty	6	6	7
(Denmark) Torben Ulrich	4	4	5
(United States) Ellsworth Donnell	6	6	0	3
(France) Robert Abdesselam	4	8	6	6
LL	(United Kingdom) Tim Miles	5	2	3
(Italy) Carlo Sada	7	6	6
(United States) Bill Robertson	6	3	2
(Socialist Federal Republic of Yugoslavia) Franjo Punčec	8	6	6
(United Kingdom) Headley Baxter	6	6	4	6
(Switzerland) Edgar Büchi	4	0	6	2
(United Kingdom) Bill Moss	7	1	2
(United Kingdom) Jimmy Jones	9	6	6
(France) Jean Ducos de la Haille	6	5	6	0	4
(United Kingdom) Bobby Meredith	1	7	3	6	6
Q	(United States) Jack Morison	9	2	1	1
Q	(United States) Charles Jones	7	6	6	6

Second round
6	(United States) J Patty	6	6	6
(France) R Abdesselam	1	1	1
(Italy) C Sada	6	2	3	2
(Socialist Federal Republic of Yugoslavia) F Punčec	2	6	6	6
(United Kingdom) H Baxter	6	2	4	3
(United Kingdom) J Jones	3	6	6	6
(United Kingdom) G Meredith	7	6	6
(United States) C Jones	5	3	1

Third round
6	(United States) J Patty	6	0
(Socialist Federal Republic of Yugoslavia) F Punčec	3	0^{r}
(United Kingdom) J Jones	6	3	6	5	5
(United Kingdom) G Meredith	4	6	3	7	7

Fourth round
6	(United States) J Patty	6	6	8
(United Kingdom) G Meredith	3	3	6

==== Section 3 ====
First round
4	(United States) Tom Brown	5	6	4	6	9
(United Kingdom) Don Butler	7	1	6	2	7
(United Kingdom) Howard Walton	6	7	6
(Republic of Ireland) Joe MacHale	4	5	1
(Italy) Renato Bossi	6	2	6
(Sweden) Borje Fornstedt	8	6	8
(United Kingdom) Paddy Roberts	11	7	4	6	8
(Australia) John Spence	9	5	6	8	6
(United Kingdom) Claude Lister	0	1	4
(India) Dilip Bose	6	6	6
(Australia) Harry Hopman	6	5	6	6
(United States) William Young	4	7	4	3
(United Kingdom) Arnold England	0	1	1
(United Kingdom) Henry Billington	6	6	6
(United Kingdom) Roy Mansell	4	7	4	3
(United Kingdom) Jack Moore	6	5	6	6

Second round
4	(United States) T Brown	6	6	7
(United Kingdom) H Walton	2	2	5
(Sweden) B Fornstedt	6	6	6
(United Kingdom) A Roberts	2	4	2
(India) D Bose	6	0	3	8	8
(Australia) H Hopman	4	6	6	6	6
(United Kingdom) H Billington	7	6	2	6
(United Kingdom) J Moore	5	1	6	3

Third round
4	(United States) T Brown	6	3	6	6
(Sweden) B Fornstedt	4	6	3	2
(India) D Bose	6	6	6
(United Kingdom) H Billington	3	3	1

Fourth round
4	(United States) T Brown	4	8	6	6
(India) D Bose	6	6	4	4

==== Section 4 ====
First round
8	(South Africa) Eric Sturgess	6	6	6
(Netherlands) Boebi van Meegeren	2	0	3
(Belgium) Jacques Peten	6	6	8
(India) Khusru Madan	3	4	6
(Egypt) Eddie Mandelbaum	3	1	3
(Argentina) Enrique Morea	6	6	6
(Poland) Ernest Wittmann	4	6	4	3
(France) Christian Grandet	6	1	6	6
(United Kingdom) John Comery	3	0	2
(Hungary) József Asbóth	6	6	6
(Norway) Johan Haanes	6	6	6
(United Kingdom) Tim Lewis	4	1	2
Q	(United Kingdom) Tony Starte	4	3	1
(United Kingdom) Edmund David	6	6	6
(Socialist Federal Republic of Yugoslavia) Josip Palada	6	6	6
(Dominion of Ceylon) Doug Scharenguivel	3	2	4

Second round
8	(South Africa) E Sturgess	6	7	6
(Belgium) J Peten	4	5	2
(Argentina) E Morea	6	5	6	6
(France) C Grandet	2	7	4	3
(Hungary) J Asbóth	7	6	6
(Norway) J Haanes	5	4	1
(United Kingdom) E David	4	0	2
(Socialist Federal Republic of Yugoslavia) J Palada	6	6	6

Third round
8	(South Africa) E Sturgess	7	6	5	6
(Argentina) E Morea	5	4	7	2
(Hungary) J Asbóth	6	6	6
(Socialist Federal Republic of Yugoslavia) J Palada	3	4	4

Fourth round
8	(South Africa) E Sturgess	6	7	5	6	1
(Hungary) J Asbóth	2	9	7	2	6

=== Bottom half ===
==== Section 5 ====
First round
Q	(Kenya) Rusty Mayers	6	6	8
(Republic of Ireland) Matthew Murphy	4	1	6
(United Kingdom) Guy Cooper	4	3	1
(United Kingdom) Derek Bull	6	6	6
(United Kingdom) Ron Reeve	6	6	6
(Hungary) Géza Erős	4	4	3
(Pakistan) Ahmed-Hasan Khokhar	0	0	2
(Belgium) Philippe Washer	6	6	6
(United Kingdom) Tony Mottram	6	6	6
(United Kingdom) Norman Kitovitz	1	4	2
(Denmark) Kurt Nielsen	2	6	6	6
(Socialist Federal Republic of Yugoslavia) Franjo Kukuljević	6	3	3	2
(Italy) Giovanni Cucelli	6	6	6
(Republic of Ireland) RJ McCabe	2	4	1
(Republic of China (1912–1949)) Choy Wai-Chuen	1	3	3
5	(Czechoslovakia) Jaroslav Drobný	6	6	6

Second round
Q	(Kenya) R Mayers	6	5	2	7	6
(United Kingdom) D Bull	4	7	6	5	4
(United Kingdom) R Reeve	1	1	1
(Belgium) P Washer	6	6	6
(United Kingdom) A Mottram	6	6	6
(Denmark) K Nielsen	2	4	1
(Italy) G Cucelli	6	16	1	2	6
5	(Czechoslovakia) J Drobný	4	14	6	6	3

Third round
Q	(Kenya) R Mayers	4	2	4
(Belgium) P Washer	6	6	6
(United Kingdom) A Mottram	6	6	10	9	6
(Italy) G Cucelli	8	3	12	7	2

Fourth round
(Belgium) P Washer	8	1	5
(United Kingdom) A Mottram	10	6	7

==== Section 6 ====
First round
(Netherlands) Ivo Rinkel	6	7	6
(United Kingdom) Dick Guise	0	5	2
Q	(United Kingdom) Laurie Proctor	1	4	2
(Belgium) Jacques Delire	6	6	6
(United Kingdom) David Mockridge	1	2	4
(United Kingdom) Leslie Cater	6	6	6
(France) Bernard Destremau	2	6	3	7	0
(Australia) Jack Harper	6	0	6	5	6
(United Kingdom) Gordon Fitt	6	5	6	6
(South Africa) Billy Muller	1	7	1	2
(Spain) Mario Szavoszt	1	4	6	3
(India) Sumant Misra	6	6	3	6
Q	(United Kingdom) Charles Dobbs	4	4	6	6
(Austria) Hans Redl	6	6	3	8
(Argentina) Alejo Russell	2	4	3
3	(United States) Gardnar Mulloy	6	6	6

Second round
(Netherlands) I Rinkel	7	6	3	5	6
(Belgium) J Delire	5	1	6	7	8
(United Kingdom) L Cater	2	2	1
(Australia) J Harper	6	6	6
(United Kingdom) G Fitt	2	1	4
(India) S Misra	6	6	6
(Austria) H Redl	1	4	4
3	(United States) G Mulloy	6	6	6

Third round
(Belgium) J Delire	2	3	3
(Australia) J Harper	6	6	6
(India) S Misra	6	4	1	6	4
3	(United States) G Mulloy	2	6	6	3	6

Fourth round
(Australia) J Harper	5	0	4
3	(United States) G Mulloy	7	6	6

==== Section 7 ====
First round
(Philippines) Raymundo Deyro	6	6	6
(United Kingdom) Dennis Slack	3	2	3
(United Kingdom) Gwyn Tuckett	4	9	3	2
Q	(United Kingdom) Lawrence Dundas	6	7	6	6
(India) Subba Sawhney	2	5	4
(Australia) Frank Sedgman	6	7	6
(Italy) Marcello del Bello	6	7	2	6
(France) Paul Rémy	2	5	6	4
(Poland) Ignacy Tłoczyński	3	5	6
(Socialist Federal Republic of Yugoslavia) Dragutin Mitić	6	7	8
(Czechoslovakia) Vojtěch Vodička	2	6	1	5
(United Kingdom) Geoffrey Paish	6	0	6	7
(United Kingdom) George Godsell	5	8	6	0
(Romania) Alexandru Hamburger	7	10	1	6
(Belgium) Jacques Brichant	1	2	3
7	(United States) Bob Falkenburg	6	6	6

Second round
(Philippines) R Deyro	6	6	6
Q	(United Kingdom) L Dundas	0	3	3
(Australia) F Sedgman	6	6	6	5	7
(Italy) M del Bello	3	2	8	7	5
(Socialist Federal Republic of Yugoslavia) D Mitić	8	6	6	6
(United Kingdom) G Paish	6	8	2	1
(Romania) A Hamburger	2	2	3
7	(United States) R Falkenburg	6	6	6

Third round
(Philippines) R Deyro	6	6	3	1
(Australia) F Sedgman	0	8	6	6
(Socialist Federal Republic of Yugoslavia) D Mitić	7	3	6	3	4
7	(United States) R Falkenburg	5	6	4	6	6

Fourth round
(Australia) F Sedgman	1	2	4
7	(United States) R Falkenburg	6	6	6

==== Section 8 ====
First round
(Switzerland) Jean-Pierre Blondel	1	3	1
(Egypt) Marcel Coen	6	6	6
(Pakistan) Mahmoud Alam	6	5	6	6
(Hungary) Béla Pető	3	7	4	3
(Sweden) Lennart Bergelin	6	6	8
(United Kingdom) Cliff Hovell	3	2	6
Q	(United Kingdom) Michael Clarke	3	4	3
(Argentina) Heraldo Weiss	6	6	6
(Australia) Alan Coldham	4	6	7	6	7
(United Kingdom) Gerry Oakley	6	2	9	4	5
(United Kingdom) Peter Hare	2	0	4
(Republic of Ireland) Cyril Kemp	6	6	6
Q	(United Kingdom) Charles Fawcus	2	1	9	4
(Norway) Finn Rune Karlsen	6	6	7	6
(New Zealand) Dennis Coombe	2	0	2
1	(United States) Frank Parker	6	6	6

Second round
(Egypt) M Coen	9	6	5	6
(Pakistan) M Alam	7	4	7	3
(Sweden) L Bergelin	4	6	6	7
(Argentina) H Weiss	6	1	1	5
(Australia) A Coldham	2	2	5
(Republic of Ireland) C Kemp	6	6	7
(Norway) FR Karlsen	0	0	2
1	(United States) F Parker	6	6	6

Third round
(Egypt) M Coen	1	1	5
(Sweden) L Bergelin	6	6	7
(Republic of Ireland) C Kemp	0	1	0
1	(United States) F Parker	6	6	6

Fourth round
(Sweden) L Bergelin	5	7	9	0	10
1	(United States) F Parker	7	5	7	6	8

Preceded by 1948 French Championships	Grand Slams; Men's Singles	Succeeded by 1948 U.S. Championships
