= Cyril Kemp =

Cyril Kemp may refer to:

- Cyril Kemp (footballer) (1904–1964), Australian rules footballer
- Cyril Kemp (tennis) (1915–2010), Irish racket sportsperson
