= Vojtěch Vodička =

Czech tennis player (1908–1967)

- Country (sports): Czechoslovakia
- Born: 13 January 1908; Holešov, Moravia, Austria-Hungary
- Died: 1967; West Germany

Singles

Grand Slam singles results
- French Open: 4R (1948)
- Wimbledon: 1R (1946, 1948)

Doubles

Grand Slam doubles results
- Wimbledon: QF (1948)

Vojtěch Vodička (13 January 1908 — 1967) was a Czech tennis player.

== Biography ==
A native of Holešov, Vodička began competing on tour in the 1930s. He played a Davis Cup tie for Czechoslovakia against Yugoslavia in Prague in 1946, as the teammate of Jaroslav Drobný. In 1948, aged 40, he made the singles fourth round of the French Championships. Along the way he had a win over Alejo Russell, after coming back from dropping the first two sets 0–6. He was a men's doubles quarter-finalist at the 1948 Wimbledon Championships.

Vodička left Czechoslovakia after the 1948 communist takeover.

His nephew Leo Marian Vodička is a noted operatic tenor.

== See also ==
- List of Czech Republic Davis Cup team representatives#Czechoslovakia players
