= Glamorgan County Championships =

Defunct tennis tournament
- Tour: ILTF World Circuit
- Founded: 1912
- Abolished: 1970
- Location: Cardiff; Dinas Powis. Wales
- Surface: Grass / outdoor

The Glamorgan County Championships or Glamorgan Championships was a combined WLTA/ILTF affiliated grass court tennis tournament founded in 1912. Also known as the Glamorganshire Championships. It was first played at the Dinas Powis LTC, in Dinas Powis, Glamorgan, Wales. It was then played in Cardiff towards the end of its run, until 1970 when it was discontinued.

== Finals ==
=== Men's singles ===
(incomplete roll included).

Year	Winners	Runners-up	Score
1920	(United Kingdom) Amphlett Davis	(United Kingdom) Harold Owen	6–1, 6–4
1939	(Argentina) Alejo Russell	(United Kingdom) Gordon Tuckett	6–4, 5-7, 7–5
1946	(United Kingdom) Gordon Tuckett	(United Kingdom) Paddy Roberts	11–9, 6–3, 6–0
1947	(United Kingdom) Bobby Meredith	(United Kingdom) Gordon Tuckett	7–9, 6–1, 6–4
1949	(Romania) Alexander Hamburger	(United Kingdom) Michael Brown	5-7, 6–1, 6–2, 6–1
1950	(United Kingdom) George Godsell	(United Kingdom) Wilfred Row	6–8, 6–3, 6–1, 6–2
1951	(Sweden) Bengt Axelsson	(South Africa) Johann Kupferburger	6–2, 2–6, 6–4
1952	(Australia) Philip Brophy	(United Kingdom) Colin Hannam	1–6, 6–3, 6–4
1953	(United Kingdom) John Horn	(Dominion of Ceylon) Rupert Ferdinands	6–2, 6–0
1956	(South Africa) Wayne Mayers	(Australia) Louis Surville	6–3, 6–4
1957	(South Africa) Derek Lawer	(South Africa) Wayne Van Voorhees	6–2, 6–4, 6–2
1960	(New Zealand) Richard Hawkes	(United Kingdom) Malcolm Gracie	6–1, 4–6, 6–0
1964	(Netherlands) Tom Okker	(United Kingdom) Gerald Battrick	6–3, 6–4
1966	(Australia) Ken Fletcher	(South Africa) Abe Segal	3–6, 6–3, 6–1
1967	(Canada) Keith Carpenter	(Japan) Keishiro Yanagi	6–3, 4–6, 6–3
1968	(Canada) Keith Carpenter	(United States) Tom Edlefsen	7–5, 6–3
↓ Open Era ↓
1969	(United Kingdom) Simon Partridge	(South Africa) Roger MacFarlane	6–2, 6–4
1970	(Australia) Bob Rheinberger	(Australia) Bill Joiner	0–6, 6–2, 6–1
