= Heraldo Weiss =

Argentine tennis player

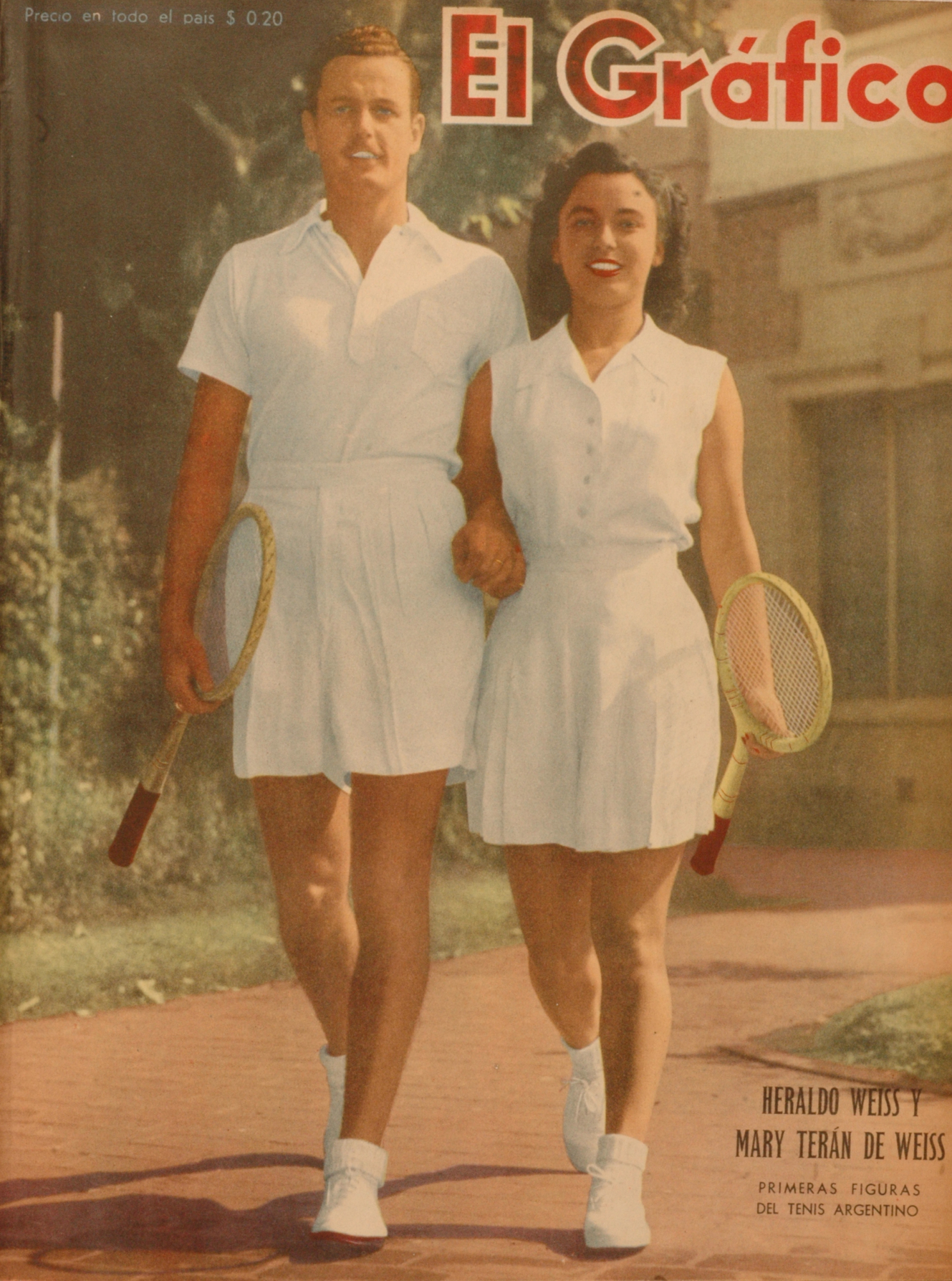
- Heraldo Weiss and his wife Mary Terán de Weiss in 1945
- Country (sports): Argentina
- Born: 31 August 1917; Lomas de Zamora, Buenos Aires, Argentina
- Died: 30 August 1952 (aged 34); Buenos Aires, Argentina
- Turned pro: 1939
- Retired: 1951

Singles

Grand Slam singles results
- French Open: 4R (1948)
- Wimbledon: 2R (1948, 1950, 1951)
- US Open: 1R (1945)

Doubles

Grand Slam doubles results
- Wimbledon: 2R (1948, 1950, 1951)

Grand Slam mixed doubles results
- Wimbledon: 4R (1948, 1949, 1950)

Heraldo Weiss (31 August 1917 – 30 August 1952) was an Argentine tennis player.

== Biography ==
Weiss was born in Lomas de Zamora, Buenos Aires, Argentina on 31 August 1917. He won a silver medal at the Pan American Games. He was one of Argentina's best tennis players between the 1940s and 1950s. He reached the eighth finals (fourth round) in the men's single tournament of Roland Garros in 1948. He also distinguished himself in several international competitions, notably in the United Kingdom and in Germany as in Baden-Baden in 1950, where he dominated Gottfried von Cramm and faced Jaroslav Drobný (a finalist in Roland-Garros three months earlier) in the final.

Weiss reached the fourth round in Wimbledon mixed tournament three times: in 1948, 1949, and 1950 (in 1949 with his wife). He was captain of the Argentina Davis Cup team. He played two Davis Cup matches with the Argentine Team against Belgium in Brussels in 1948.

He was the husband of tennis champion Mary Terán de Weiss. Weiss died in 1952, he had fallen ill after returning from a tennis tour in Europe a fortnight before.

== Career finals ==
=== Singles ===
Result	Date	Tournament	Surface	Opponent	Score
Win	1942	Argentina Grass Championships	Grass	(Argentina) Alejo Russell	3–6, 6–4, 6–1, 6–4
Win	1944	Argentino Lawn Tennis Club	Clay	(Argentina) Alejo Russell	6–4, 6–0
Win	1944	Mar del Plata, Argentina	Clay	(Argentina) Alejo Russell	4–6, 6–2, 6–2, 2–6, 6–4
Win	1945	River Plate Championships	Clay	(Argentina) Enrique Morea	6–2, 6–1, 6–3
Win	1948	Turkish International Championships	Clay	(Austria) Hans Redl	1–6, 1–6, 6–4, 6–0, 6-4
Win	1949	South of England Championships	Grass	(United Kingdom) Donald Butler	6–3, 6–2
Win	1949	Scottish Hard Court Championships	Clay	(Poland) Ted Slawek	6–2, 6–0
Win	1950	Ulster Championships	Grass	(Czechoslovakia) Milan Matouš	6–4, 6–1
Win	1950	Düsseldorf International	Clay	(India) Dilip Bose	3–6, 8–6, 6–4, 6–3
Win	1950	Dortmund International	Clay	(Australia) Jack Harper	5–7, 2–6, 6–1, 6–2, 6–3
Win	1950	East of Ireland Championships	Grass	(Republic of Ireland) Matt Murphy	8–6, 6–1
Loss	1950	Baden Baden International	Clay	(Egypt) Jaroslav Drobný	6–1, 6–1
