= List of Czech Republic Davis Cup team representatives =

This is a list of tennis players who have represented the Czech Republic Davis Cup team in an official Davis Cup match. The team is considered a direct successor of the Czechoslovak side, which competed from 1921 to 1992, therefore share their historical record. They started playing as the Czech Republic in 1993.

== Czech Republic players ==
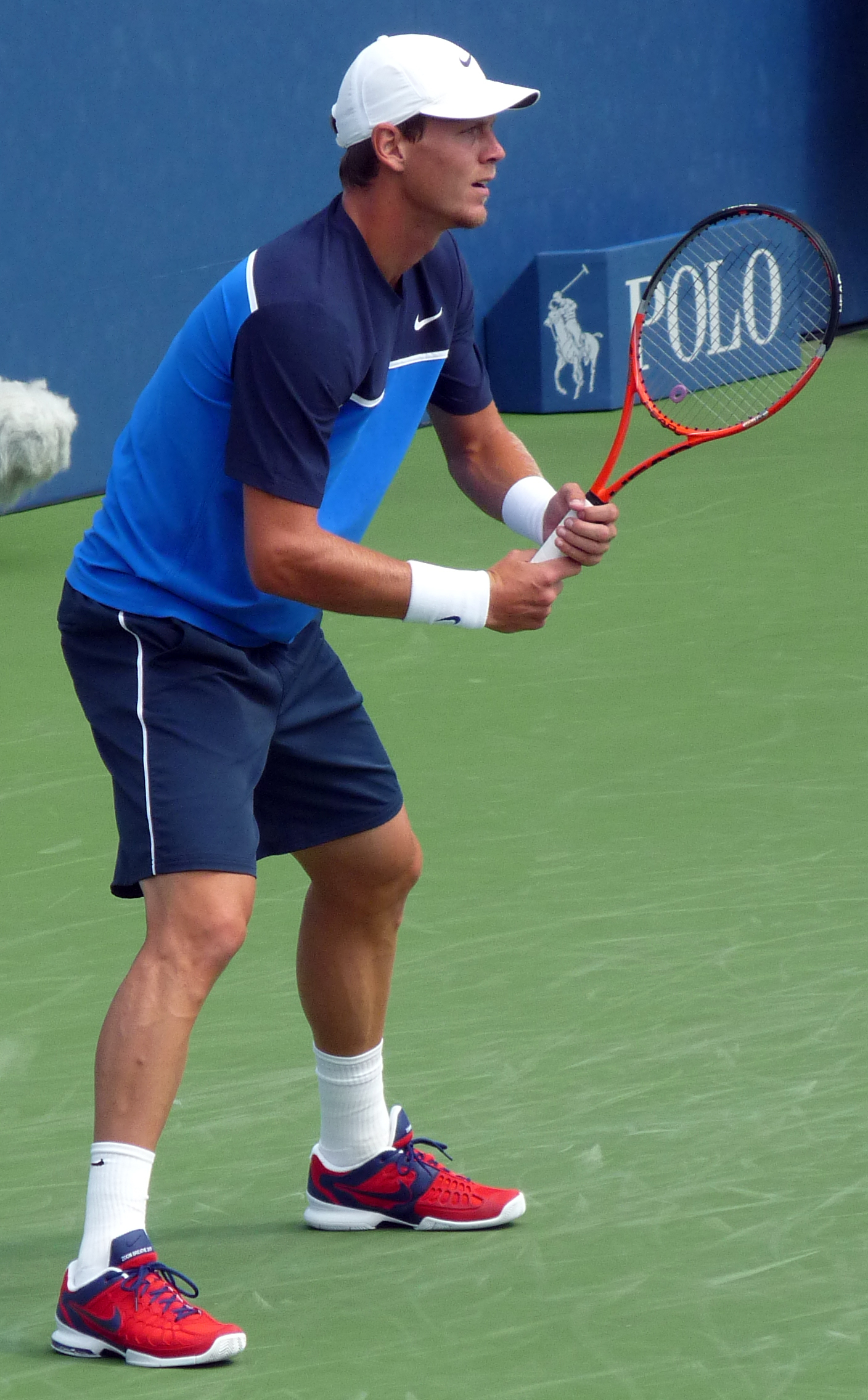
Tomáš Berdych

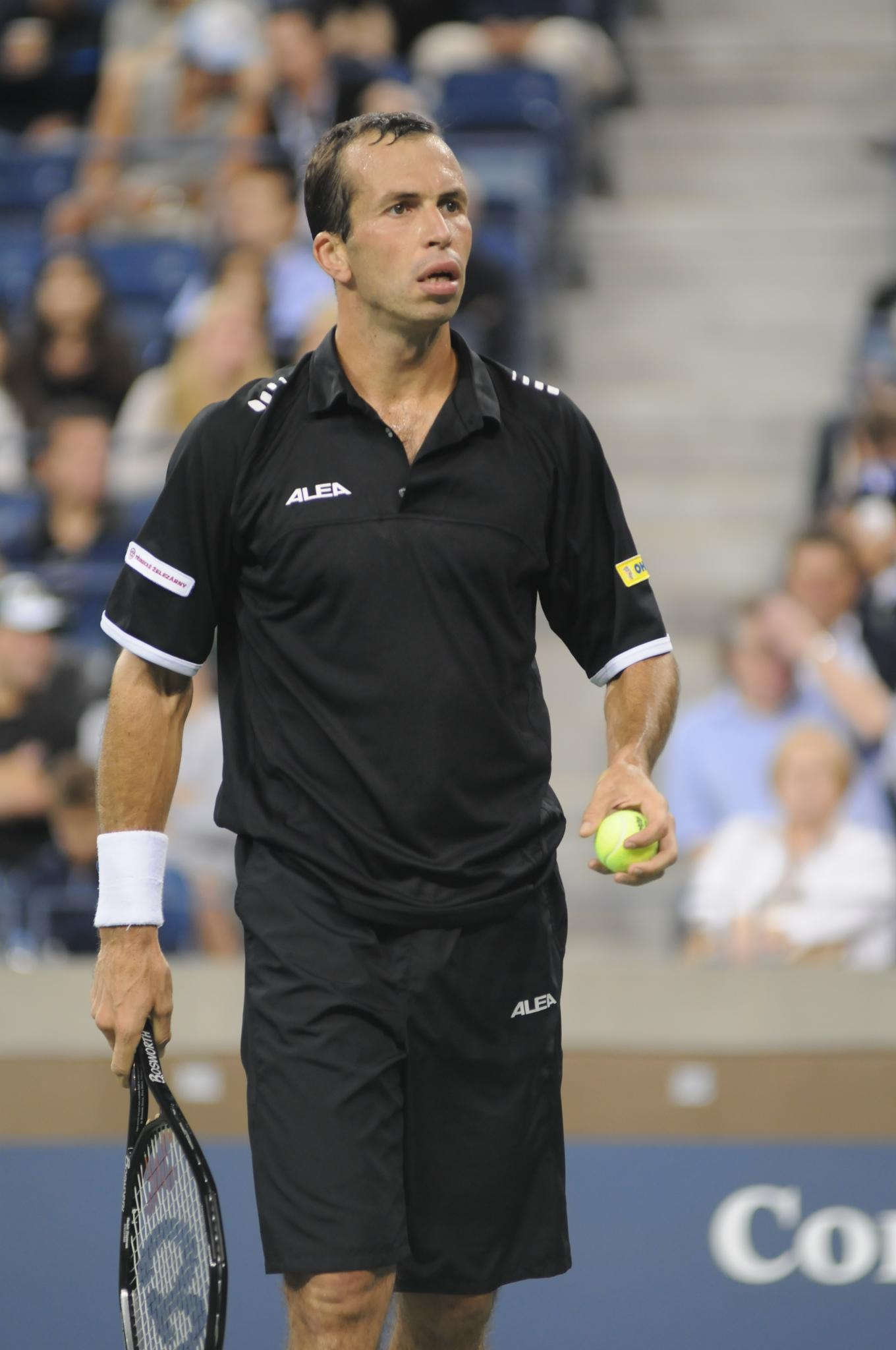
Radek Štěpánek

Player	W-L (Total)	W-L (Singles)	W-L (Doubles)	Ties	Debut
Tomáš Berdych	30–12	17–11	13–1	20	2003
František Čermák	0–2	0–1	0–1	2	2005
Martin Damm	2–8	1–3	1–5	7	1993
Lukáš Dlouhý	6–6	3–5	3–1	9	2006
Slava Doseděl	3–8	3–8	0–0	6	1994
Leoš Friedl	0–1	0–0	0–1	1	2005
Jan Hájek	4–4	3–4	1–0	6	2009
Jan Hernych	0–4	0–3	0–1	3	2005
Petr Korda	16–7 (Note: If games played for Czechoslovakia are included his tally is 29–13)	18–9	11–4	18	1988
Petr Kralert	1–0	1–0	0–0	1	1999
Ivo Minář	2–2	2–2	0–0	3	2007
Karel Nováček	3–3 (Note: If games played for Czechoslovakia are included his tally is 9–11)	9–11	0–0	11	1987
Jiří Novák	27–7	17–5	10–2	17	1996
David Rikl	8–5	1–2	7–3	10	1997
Lukáš Rosol	2–0	2–0	0–0	2	2011
Radek Štěpánek	22–10	11–8	11–2	14	2003
Cyril Suk	4–4 (Note: If games played for Czechoslovakia are included his tally is 6–4)	0–0	6–4	10	1992
Michal Tabara	1–1	1–1	0–0	2	2001
Bohdan Ulihrach	11–7	11–7	0–0	10	1995
Daniel Vacek	8–7	5–5	3–2	7	1995
Jan Vacek	0–1	0–1	0–0	1	2002
Pavel Vízner	0–3	0–1	0–2	3	2007
Tomáš Zíb	2–4	2–3	0–1	3	2005

== Czechoslovakia players ==
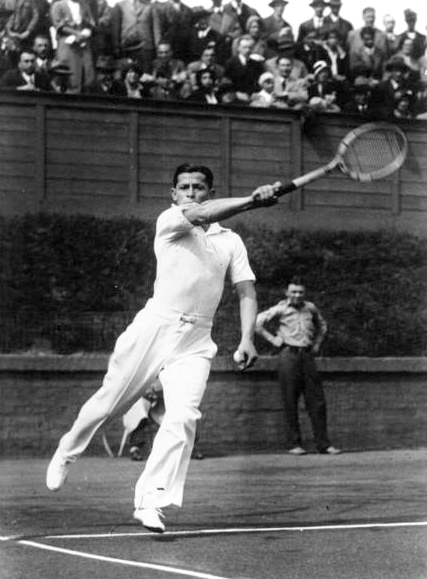
Ladislav Hecht

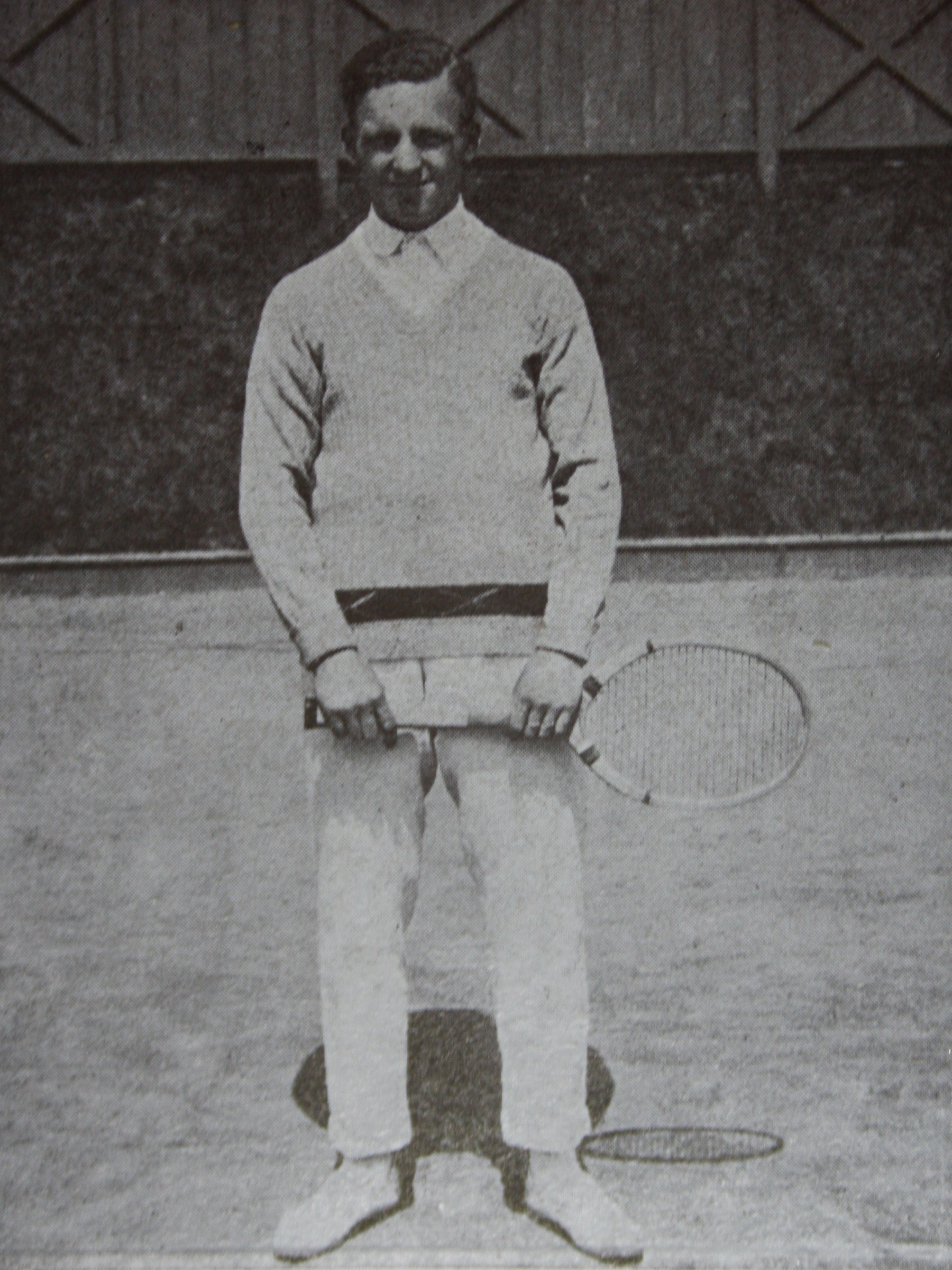
Jan Koželuh

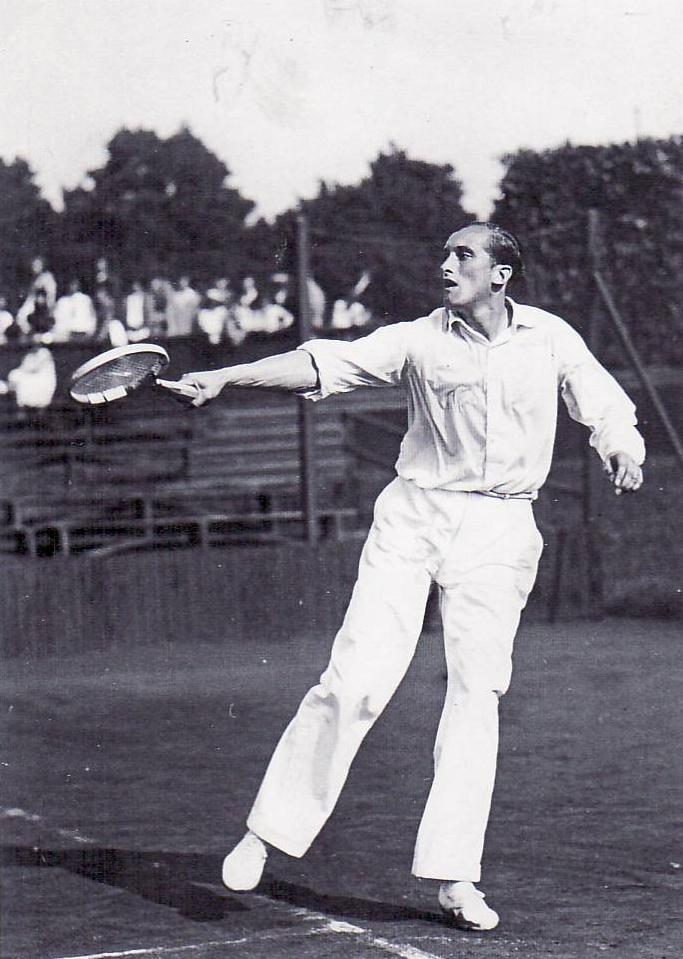
Roderich Menzel

Player	W-L (Total)	W-L (Singles)	W-L (Doubles)	Ties	Debut
Pavel Benda	2–2	2–2	0–0	2	1958
Stanislav Birner	0–1	0–1	0–0	1	1980
Josef Caska	7–4	5–3	2–1	7	1935
František Cejnar	3–1	2–1	1–0	3	1937
Vladimír Černík	21–15	10–13	11–2	13	1947
Jaroslav Drobný	37–6	24–4	13–2	15	1946
Ernst Gottlieb	0–1	0–1	0–0	1	1927
Jiří Granát	1–0	0–0	1–0	1	1977
Ladislav Hecht	18–19	14–15	4–4	18	1931
Milan Holeček	8–15	4–12	4–3	9	1964
Jiří Hřebec	18–16	17–12	1–4	17	1972
Jiří Javorský	33–22	20–15	13–7	20	1955
Jaroslav Just	0–1	0–0	0–1	1	1921
Jan Kodeš	60–34	39–19	21–15	39	1966
Petr Korda	13–6	7–4	6–2	9	1988
Pavel Korda	5–5	5–4	0–1	5	1960
Štěpán Koudelka	1–4	0–3	1–1	3	1963
Jan Koželuh	29–17	17–10	12–7	20	1924
Ján Krajčík	1–3	0–2	1–1	2	1957
Jan Kukal	13–11	5–4	8–7	16	1968
Ivan Lendl	22–15	18–11	4–4	17	1978
Pavel Macenauer	9–11	4–10	5–1	11	1924
Ferenc Maršálek	11–3	1–0	10–3	13	1931
Miloslav Mečíř	23–9	18–8	5–1	13	1983
Roderich Menzel	53–22	40–12	13–10	30	1928
Jaroslav Navrátil	1–0	1–0	0–0	1	1983
Milan Nečas	2–0	0–0	2–0	2	1958
Karel Nováček	6–8	6–8	0–0	8	1987
František Pála	15–10	14–9	1–1	15	1966
Jiří Parma	3–4	3–3	0–1	4	1956
Libor Pimek	3–3	2–2	1–1	4	1983
Karel Ardelt	0–5	0–4	0–1	2	1921
Friedrich Rohrer	7–11	6–8	1–3	9	1922
Josef Síba	5–3	5–3	0–0	5	1933
Pavel Složil	11–4	4–2	7–2	11	1978
Tomáš Šmíd	42–25	22–15	20–10	31	1977
František Sojka	1–0	1–0	0–0	1	1927
Milan Šrejber	12–7	9–5	3–2	10	1986
Petr Štrobl	5–4	2–3	3–1	4	1962
Cyril Suk	2–0	0–0	2–0	2	1992
Vojtěch Vodička	0–2	0–2	0–0	1	1946
Ferdinand Vrba	3–1	3–1	0–0	3	1947
Vladimír Zábrodský	5–5	2–3	3–2	6	1948
Vladimír Zedník	4–6	2–2	2–4	8	1969
Ladislav Žemla	13–10	6–5	7–5	12	1921
