= Borje Fornstedt =

Swedish tennis player

Börje Fornstedt
- Country (sports): Sweden
- Born: 4 February 1926; Edsbyn, Sweden
- Died: 22 September 2015 (aged 89)
- Turned pro: 1948(amateur tour)
- Retired: 1955

Singles

Grand Slam singles results
- French Open: 2R (1952)
- Wimbledon: 3R (1948)

Doubles

Grand Slam doubles results
- Wimbledon: 1R (1948)

Mixed doubles

Grand Slam mixed doubles results
- Wimbledon: 2R (1948)

Emil Börje Fornstedt (4 February 1926 – 22 September 2015) was a Swedish tennis player.

== Tennis career ==
In 1948 Fornstedt won the Scandinavian singles championships held in Copenhagen beating Kurt Nielsen, 1–6, 7–5, 6–1, 6–2 in the final and he also won the doubles, with Sven Davidson. During July 1948 he represented Sweden in the Davis Cup Europe Zone final against Czechoslovakia.

In September 1949 he won the Aachen Invitational Tournament in Germany, beating Ernst Buchholz in the final and in October 1949 he won the first Israeli International Championships, with a victory over Yehuda Finkelkraut in the final. Fornstedt participated in two Grand Slam events, the 1948 Wimbledon Championships and the 1952 French Open.

He together with Sven Davidson, among others, were also the founders of the Stockholm Open, that was founded in 1969.

== See also ==
- List of Sweden Davis Cup team representatives
