= Bobby Meredith =

British tennis player

- Full name: George Robert Broughton Meredith
- Country (sports): United Kingdom
- Born: 15 July 1909; Hugglescote, Leicestershire
- Died: 23 August 1994 (aged 85); Leicester, Leicestershire

Singles
- Career titles: 4

Grand Slam singles results
- Wimbledon: 4R (1948)

Doubles

Grand Slam doubles results
- Wimbledon: 3R (1947)

Grand Slam mixed doubles results
- Wimbledon: 3R (1933, 1934, 1936, 1937, 1948)

George Robert Broughton Meredith (15 July 1909 — 23 August 1994) was a British tennis player.

== Career ==
Born in the Leicestershire village of Hugglescote, Meredith was the son of a local doctor.

Meredith played cricket for the Dover College first eleven but couldn't pursue the sport further due to the hours he had to work in his part time retail job. Introduced to tennis by his elder sister, he became the Leicestershire junior champion as a 15-year old and was 16 when first picked for the county side, for which he later captained.

Meredith won his first open title in 1933 at the Tally Ho! Tournament in Birmingham, by beating Davis Cup player Keats Lester in the final. He also made his Wimbledon singles main draw debut that year and was beaten in the first round by the tournament's top seed Ellsworth Vines.

In 1946 he won the Nottinghamshire Championships defeating Peter Hare in the final. In 1947 he won the Northamptonshire Championships at Wellingborough against Jeffrey Michelmore. His fourth and final singles title came at the Glamorganshire Championships at Dinas Powys where he beat Gordon Gwyn Lennox Tuckett in the final.

An England representative player, Meredith had his best Wimbledon performance at the 1948 Wimbledon Championships, where he won through to the fourth round, before losing to Budge Patty.

Meredith stepped down as Managing Director of Leicester sporting goods store Sports Ltd on Belvoir Street in 1980 after working there for many years. He had three daughters with wife Margaret.
