= 1948 Wimbledon Championships – Girls' singles =

Girls' singles
- 1948 Wimbledon Championships

Final
- Champion: (Czechoslovakia) Olga Mišková
- Runner-up: (Switzerland) Violette Rigollet
- Score: 6–4, 6–2

Events
Singles	men	women		boys	girls
Doubles	men	women	mixed	boys	girls
← 1947 ·	Wimbledon Championships	· 1949 →

Olga Mišková defeated Violette Rigollet in the final, 6–4, 6–2 to win the girls' singles tennis title at the 1948 Wimbledon Championships.

== Draw ==
=== Key ===
- Q = Qualifier
- WC = Wild card
- LL = Lucky loser
- Alt = Alternate
- SE = Special exempt
- PR = Protected ranking
- ITF = ITF entry
- JE = Junior exempt
- w/o = Walkover
- r = Retired
- d = Defaulted
- SR = Special ranking

=== Final ===
Final
(Czechoslovakia) Olga Mišková	6	6
(Switzerland) Violette Rigollet	4	2

=== Group A ===
	(Czechoslovakia) O Mišková	(Greece) M Akrivou	(Canada) P Lowe	(Denmark) M Jerndoff	(United Kingdom) N Seacy	(Monaco) PE Sethimo	RR; W–L	Set; W–L	Game; W–L	Standings
(Czechoslovakia) Olga Mišková		8–1	7–2	5–4	5–4	9–0	5–0	5–0	34–11	1
(Greece) M Akrivou	1–8		4–5	4–5	1–8	6–3	1–4	1–4	16–29	5
(Canada) P Lowe	2–7	5–4		6–3	2–7	8–1	3–2	3–2	23–22	3
(Denmark) M Jerndoff	4–5	5–4	3–6		3–6	5–4	2–3	2–3	20–25	4
(United Kingdom) Norma Seacy	4–5	8–1	7–2	6–3		9–0	4–1	4–1	34–11	2
(Monaco) PE Sethimo	0–9	3–6	1–8	4–5	0–9		0–5	0–5	8–37	6

=== Group B ===
	(Switzerland) V Rigollet	(Netherlands) I Lim	(Belgium) D Holter Sorensen	(Sweden) B Wallen	(Republic of Ireland) H Cole	(Belgium) J Chantraine	RR; W–L	Set; W–L	Game; W–L	Standings
(Switzerland) Violette Rigollet		7–2	8–1	7–2	7–2	8–1	5–0	5–0	37–8	1
(Netherlands) I Lim	2–7		5–4	1–8	2–7	5–4	2–3	2–3	15–30	4
(Belgium) D Holter Sorensen	1–8	4–5		2–7	1–8	6–3	1–4	1–4	14–31	5
(Sweden) B Wallen	2–7	8–1	7–2		4–5	5–4	3–2	3–2	26–19	3
(Republic of Ireland) Heather Cole	2–7	7–2	8–1	5–4		7–2	4–1	4–1	29–16	2
(Belgium) J Chantraine	1–8	4–5	3–6	4–5	2–7		0–5	0–5	14–31	6
