= Ahmed-Hasan Khokhar =

Pakistani tennis player

- Country (sports): Pakistan
- Born: British India

Singles
- Career titles: 0

Grand Slam singles results
- Australian Open: -
- French Open: -
- Wimbledon: 1R (1948)
- US Open: -

Doubles
- Career titles: 0
- Last updated on: January 7, 2007.

Ahmed-Hasan Khokhar (born in British India) is a former tennis player from Pakistan.

== Wimbledon ==
He is the first Pakistani (alongside Mahmoud Alam) to play at Wimbledon. He took part in the 1948 Wimbledon Championship during the pre-open era.

Scores

- 1st round: lost to Philippe Washer of Belgium, 0–6, 0–6, 2–6.
