= 1948 Davis Cup =

1948 edition of the Davis Cup

Details
- Duration: 22 April – 6 September 1948
- Edition: 37th
- Teams: 29

Champion
- Winning nation: United States

The 1948 Davis Cup was the 37th edition of the most important tournament between national teams in men's tennis. 25 teams entered the Europe Zone, and four teams entered the America Zone. Pakistan and Turkey made their first appearances in the competition.

Australia defeated Mexico in the America Zone final, and Czechoslovakia defeated Sweden in the Europe Zone final. Australia defeated Czechoslovakia in the Inter-Zonal play-off, but fell to defending champions the United States in the Challenge Round. The championship was played at the West Side Tennis Club in Forest Hills, New York, United States on 4–6 September.

== America Zone ==
=== Draw ===
Semifinals; 8–25 July
Havana, Cuba
Australia	5
Cuba	0
Montreal, Canada (grass)
Canada	1
Mexico	4

Final; 6–8 August
Mexico City, Mexico (clay)
Australia	4
Mexico	1

=== Final ===
Mexico vs. Australia

Mexico
1
Centro Deportivo Chapultepec, Mexico City, Mexico
6–8 August 1948
Clay

Australia
4

			1	2	3	4	5
1	(Mexico) (Australia)	Armando Vega; Bill Sidwell	6; 2	6; 8	6; 3	4; 6	5; 7
2	(Mexico) (Australia)	Gustavo Palafox; Adrian Quist	4; 6	1; 6	4; 6
3	(Mexico) (Australia)	Gustavo Palafox / Armando Vega; Geoff Brown / Colin Long	0; 6	2; 6	2; 6
4	(Mexico) (Australia)	Armando Vega; Adrian Quist	9; 7	6; 4	6; 2
5	(Mexico) (Australia)	Francisco Guerrero Arcocha; Bill Sidwell	1; 6	4; 6	2; 6

== Europe Zone ==
=== Draw ===
First Round; 22 April–5 May
Netherlands
bye
Portugal
bye
Norway
bye
Great Britain	3
India	2
Hungary	5
Austria	0
Romania	2
France	3
Spain	0
Sweden	4
Switzerland	3
Pakistan	2
Ireland	5
Luxembourg	0
Denmark	3
Egypt	2
Turkey	0
Yugoslavia	5
Italy	w/o
Poland
bye
Czechoslovakia
bye
Brazil
bye
Belgium
bye
Argentina

Second Round; 6–18 May
Scheveningen, Netherlands (clay)
Netherlands	5
Portugal	0
Oslo, Norway (clay)
Norway	1
Great Britain	4
Paris, France (clay)
Hungary	4
France	1
Stockholm, Sweden (clay)
Sweden	5
Switzerland	0
Dublin, Ireland (grass)
Ireland	2
Denmark	3
Zagreb, Yugoslavia
Yugoslavia	2
Italy	3
Prague, Czechoslovakia
Czechoslovakia	4
Brazil	1
Brussels, Belgium
Belgium	3
Argentina	2

Quarterfinals; 10–14 June
Birmingham, England (grass)
Netherlands	1
Great Britain	4
Budapest, Hungary (clay)
Hungary	2
Sweden	3
Turin, Italy (clay)
Denmark	0
Italy	5
Prague, Czechoslovakia
Czechoslovakia	3
Belgium	2

Semifinals; 9–11 July
Stockholm, Sweden (clay)
Great Britain	1
Sweden	4
Milan, Italy (clay)
Italy	2
Czechoslovakia	3

Final; 27–29 July
Prague, Czechoslovakia (clay)
Sweden	1
Czechoslovakia	4

=== Final ===
Czechoslovakia vs. Sweden

Czechoslovakia
4
Prague, Czechoslovakia
27–29 July 1948
Clay

Sweden
1

			1	2	3	4	5
1	(Czechoslovakia) (Sweden)	Vladimír Černík; Torsten Johansson	6; 4	4; 6	6; 3	6; 3
2	(Czechoslovakia) (Sweden)	Jaroslav Drobný; Lennart Bergelin	6; 0	6; 3	7; 5
3	(Czechoslovakia) (Sweden)	Vladimír Černík / Jaroslav Drobný; Lennart Bergelin / Torsten Johansson	6; 2	6; 1	6; 2
4	(Czechoslovakia) (Sweden)	Vladimír Zábrodský; Torsten Johansson	3; 6	6; 3	2; 6	3; 6
5	(Czechoslovakia) (Sweden)	Ferdinand Vrba; Börje Fornstedt	6; 3	6; 1	6; 3

== Inter-Zonal Final ==
Australia vs. Czechoslovakia

Australia
3
Longwood Cricket Club, Boston, MA, United States
19–22 August 1948
Grass

Czechoslovakia
2

			1	2	3	4	5
1	(Australia) (Czechoslovakia)	Adrian Quist; Vladimír Černík	6; 2	13; 11	6; 0
2	(Australia) (Czechoslovakia)	Bill Sidwell; Jaroslav Drobný	6; 3	6; 2	9; 11	14; 12
3	(Australia) (Czechoslovakia)	Geoff Brown / Colin Long; Vladimír Černík / Jaroslav Drobný	8; 10	6; 4	3; 6	4; 6
4	(Australia) (Czechoslovakia)	Adrian Quist; Jaroslav Drobný	8; 6	6; 3	16; 18	3; 6	5; 7
5	(Australia) (Czechoslovakia)	Bill Sidwell; Vladimír Černík	7; 5	6; 4	6; 2

== Challenge Round ==
United States vs. Australia

United States
5
West Side Tennis Club, Forest Hills, NY, United States
4–6 September 1948
Grass

Australia
0

			1	2	3	4	5
1	(United States) (Australia)	Frank Parker; Bill Sidwell	6; 4	6; 4	6; 4
2	(United States) (Australia)	Ted Schroeder; Adrian Quist	6; 3	4; 6	6; 0	6; 0
3	(United States) (Australia)	Gardnar Mulloy / Bill Talbert; Colin Long / Bill Sidwell	8; 6	9; 7	2; 6	7; 5
4	(United States) (Australia)	Ted Schroeder; Bill Sidwell	6; 2	6; 1	6; 1
5	(United States) (Australia)	Frank Parker; Adrian Quist	6; 2	6; 2	6; 3
