= 1948 Wimbledon Championships – Boys' singles =

Boys' singles
- 1948 Wimbledon Championships

Final
- Champion: (Sweden) Staffan Stockenberg
- Runner-up: (Hungary) Dezső Vad
- Score: 6–0, 6–8, 5–7, 6–4, 6–2

Events
Singles	men	women		boys	girls
Doubles	men	women	mixed	boys	girls
← 1947 ·	Wimbledon Championships	· 1949 →

Staffan Stockenberg defeated Dezső Vad in the final, 6–0, 6–8, 5–7, 6–4, 6–2 to win the boys' singles tennis title at the 1948 Wimbledon Championships.

== Draw ==
=== Key ===
- Q = Qualifier
- WC = Wild card
- LL = Lucky loser
- Alt = Alternate
- SE = Special exempt
- PR = Protected ranking
- ITF = ITF entry
- JE = Junior exempt
- w/o = Walkover
- r = Retired
- d = Defaulted
- SR = Special ranking

=== Final ===
Final
(Hungary) Dezső Vad	0	8	7	4	2
(Sweden) Staffan Stockenberg	6	6	5	6	6

=== Group A ===
	(Hungary) Vad	(France) Molinari	(Czechoslovakia) Genza	(Denmark) Larson	(Belgium) Berksmans	(Finland) Krause	RR; W–L	Set; W–L	Game; W–L	Standings
(Hungary) Dezső Vad		4–5	8–1	6–3	6–3	7–2	4–1	4–1	31–14	1
(France) Jean-Claude Molinari	5–4		3–6	5–4	8–1	8–1	4–1	4–1	29–16	2
(Czechoslovakia) Genza	1–8	6–3		3–6	7–2	5–4	3–2	3–2	22–23	4
(Denmark) J Larson	3–6	4–5	6–3		6–3	7–2	3–2	3–2	26–19	3
(Belgium) L Berksmans	3–6	1–8	2–7	3–6		6–3	1–4	1–4	15–30	5
(Finland) Lars-Henrik Krause	2–7	1–8	4–5	2–7	3–6		0–5	0–5	12–33	6

=== Group B ===
	(Sweden) Stockenberg	(Republic of Ireland) Fitzpatrick	(France) Dubuisson	(Netherlands) Flier	(Norway) Pape	(Switzerland) Müller	RR; W–L	Set; W–L	Game; W–L	Standings
(Sweden) Staffan Stockenberg		4–5	6–3	7–2	6–3	5–4	4–1	4–1	28–17	1
(Republic of Ireland) Gerry Fitzpatrick	5–4		4–5	3–6	6–3	0–9	2–3	2–3	18–27	4
(France) Roland Dubuisson	3–6	5–4		7–2	5–4	4–5	3–2	3–2	24–21	3
(Netherlands) P Flier	2–7	6–3	2–7		1–8	2–7	1–4	1–4	13–32	6
(Norway) Rolf Pape	3–6	3–6	4–5	8–1		3–6	1–4	1–4	21–24	5
(Switzerland) MW Müller	4–5	9–0	5–4	7–2	6–3		4–1	4–1	31–14	2
