= Lyme Regis Open =

Defunct tennis tournament
- Tour: ILTF Circuit
- Founded: 1886; 140 years ago
- Abolished: 1950; 76 years ago
- Location: Lyme Regis, Dorset, England
- Venue: Lyme Regis TA Grounds

The Lyme Regis Open was men's and women's grass court tennis tournament founded in 1886 as the Lyme Regis Tennis Tournament. The tournament was organised by the Lyme Regis Tennis Association and was staged annually until 1939 when it was discontinued due to World War II. The tournament was revived in 1947 and continued till 1950 when it was abolished.

== History ==
In August 1886 the Lyme Regis Tennis Tournament was established at Lyme Regis, Dorset, England. The event was organised by the Lyme Regis Tennis Association. After 1910 the tournament was staged on marked out courts at the Ferndown Recreation Ground (later renamed to the King George V Playing Fields). It continued to be held until 1939, the then Mayor of Lyme Regis William Emmett, presented trophies to all the event winners of the last event. It was then discontinued because of the Second World War. The tournament was revived for brief period after the war until 1950 when it was abolished. Four permanent tennis courts were eventually built King George V Playing Fields between 1958 and 1961, and expanded to six by 1993. Today the Uplyme and Lyme Regis Tennis Club is located at the King George V fields. Previous winners of the men's singles included Tim Lewis.

== See also ==
- Charmouth Open (tennis tournament at Charmouth close to Lyme Regis)
- Lyme Regis
