= Jack Moore (sportsman) =

English footballer, referee and tennis player

Personal information
- Full name: John Ambrose Moore
- Date of birth: 6 July 1911
- Place of birth: Stone, Staffordshire, England
- Position: Goalkeeper

Youth career
- Old Alleyneans
- Stone St. Michael's

Senior career*
Years	Team	Apps	(Gls)
- Stafford Rangers
1939–1940	Port Vale	0	(0)
- Michelin
- * Club domestic league appearances and goals

John Ambrose Moore (born 6 July 1911) was an English amateur footballer, referee and tennis player.

== Football career ==
Moore played for Old Alleyneans, Stone St. Michael's and Stafford Rangers before joining Port Vale in February 1939. His only appearance was a 7–0 defeat at Manchester City on 18 May 1940 in a war league match. He departed at the end of the 1939–40 season as the club went into abeyance due to World War II. He later moved on to Michelin and also worked as a referee.

== Tennis career ==
Moore was an accomplished tennis player and played at Wimbledon on seven occasions as an amateur (as almost all top players were at the time) between 1938 and 1950. Even the Australian champion, Rod Laver, showed Moore a cheque for £125, which he received after he'd won the men's singles for the third time. With the prize money was a warning note saying it could not be spent on food or clothes, as this might jeopardise his amateur status.

Moore's big moment came in 1948 when he reached the second round of the singles and met Tim Henman's grandfather, Henry Billington, a Davis Cup international. He was beaten but took Billington to four sets. The next day, the Daily Mirror praised the performance of "the boy from up country", though it didn't please Moore himself. The tennis club at hometown Stone boasted an impressive list of Wimbledon performers, and "up country", he felt, was a slur on the club and the whole town.

Moore later took up a coaching job in Nottingham and played tennis nearly all his life, well into his 80s.
