= Tim Lewis (tennis) =

British tennis player (1925–2017)

- Full name: Norman Rollinson Lewis
- Country (sports): Great Britain
- Born: 1925 Lymington, Hampshire
- Died: 26 February 2017 (aged 91) Newport Pagnell, Buckinghamshire

Grand Slam singles results
- Wimbledon: 2R (1953)
- US Open: 1R (1949)

Grand Slam doubles results
- Wimbledon: 2R (1954)

Grand Slam mixed doubles results
- Wimbledon: 4R (1948)

Norman Rollinson "Tim" Lewis (1925 – 26 February 2017) was a British tennis player.

== Biography ==
Born and raised in Hampshire, Lewis was one of seven siblings and had an early introduction to the sport by playing on the tennis court at their family home. He was a pupil at Homefield School in Dorset and studied medicine at St Catharine's College, Cambridge, as well as Westminster Hospital. A Cambridge blue for tennis, he also played with the RAF during his war service. He was a medical officer stationed at RAF Halton.

Lewis was active on tour post war he won the Lyme Regis Open in 1947. He made regular Wimbledon appearances, which included making the mixed doubles fourth round in 1948. He earned a Davis Cup call up in 1949 and played a reverse singles rubber in Great Britain 5–0 sweep over Portugal in Lisbon. Later in 1949 he travelled to the United States and played in the U.S. National Championships, losing his first round match in five sets to Frank Shields.

During the 1950s he moved with wife Lorna to Leatherhead, Surrey and began working as a general practitioner.

== See also ==
- List of Great Britain Davis Cup team representatives
