= Cyril Kemp (footballer) =

Australian rules footballer, born 1904

Personal information
- Full name: Cyril Kemp
- Born: 14 August 1904
- Died: 14 June 1964 (aged 59)
- Original team: Clifton Hill
- Height: 168 cm (5 ft 6 in)
- Weight: 67 kg (148 lb)

Playing career^{1}
Years	Club	Games (Goals)
1926–28	Fitzroy	26 (1)
1929–31	North Melbourne	30 (5)
Total		56 (6)
- ^{1} Playing statistics correct to the end of 1931.

Cyril Kemp (14 August 1904 – 14 June 1964) was a former Australian rules footballer who played with Fitzroy and North Melbourne in the Victorian Football League (VFL).
