= Howard Walton =

British tennis player (1916–1989)

- Full name: Howard Francis Walton
- Country (sports): United Kingdom
- Born: 23 July 1916 Birmingham, England
- Died: 14 December 1989 (aged 73)
- Plays: Right-handed

Grand Slam singles results
- French Open: 2R (1950)
- Wimbledon: 2R (1947, 1948, 1951, 1952)

Howard Francis Walton (23 July 1916 – 14 December 1989) was a British tennis player active in the 1940s, 1950s and 1960s. He also represented England at the World Table Tennis Championships.

Walton, youngest of six children, was the only son born to Percival Walton and Florence Bargery in Birmingham. He was known for having a distinctive cramped style of tennis which came about from the way he had practised as a child. While living in Manchester, his father had turned two of their attics into a court. Due to the cramped space there was not even enough room for a forehand drive so his own style of play developed.

First playing tournament tennis while he was in the RAF, Walton won the Warwickshire county title four times and regularly featured at Wimbledon post war. By the time of his last Wimbledon appearance in 1963 he was the only English player, along with Geoffrey Paish, to have not missed a main draw during this period.

In 1948 he earned a call up to the Great Britain Davis Cup team for a tie against India in Harrogate. His selection was aided by the fact he had a week prior beaten two of the Indian players when he won a tournament in Paddington. He featured in two singles rubbers for Great Britain and lost in both, to Dilip Bose and Sumant Misra. Great Britain still won the tie and progressed to play Norway in Oslo, but Walton was replaced in the team by Headley Baxter.

Walton was married in 1964 to Betty Green, a company director from West Hampstead, London.

== See also ==
- List of Great Britain Davis Cup team representatives
