= Sumant Misra =

Indian tennis player

- Born: 11 January 1923; Faizabad, Uttar Pradesh, India
- Died: 3 September 2011 (aged 88)
- Children: 2, including Gaurav
- Tennis career
- Country (sports): India
- Height: 6 ft 2 in (188 cm)

Grand Slam doubles results
- Wimbledon: Quarterfinalist (1947, 1948)
- US Open: Quarterfinalist (1947)

Sumant Misra (11 January 1923 – 3 September 2011) was an Indian tennis player.

== Biography ==
Misra, who was born in Faizabad, Uttar Pradesh, played on the India Davis Cup team for nine years between 1947 and 1956 and captained the team in 1952 and 1953. He reached the quarter-finals of the Wimbledon Men's Doubles Championship (along with Jimmy Mehta) in 1947 and 1948 and the US National Doubles at Forest Hills in 1947, being the only pair in the championships to take a set off Schoder and Kramer the winners, who had won both Wimbledon and the US Nationals at Forest Hills that year.

He won the last All India Tennis Championships in 1944–45 and then went on to win the first newly christened National Lawn Tennis Championships of India that was held at Calcutta South Club in Woodburn Park Road, in 1946–47 beating Man Mohan Lal. In 1952–53 he won the national championships again and was the finalist on three other occasions. In the 1947–48 final he was defeated by Lennart Bergelin of Sweden (in later years better known as Björn Borg's coach).

In 1972, Misra's son Gaurav Misra defeated Ramanathan Krishnan to win the National Lawn Tennis Championships of India held at Calcutta South Club, making them the first father–son to win the national championships.

Sumant Misra also won the men's singles title at both the Ceylon and Malay Nationals in 1958–59 and 1959 respectively. Since there was no ATP Tour then, each country held their own national events. He was the finalist at the inaugural Asian Tennis Championship in 1949. His game was dominated by a cannonball serve and a lethal backhand. Nicknamed 'Tiny', 89-year-old Sumant Misra carried the moniker like a crown on his 6 feet and 2 inches tall frame. Also called 'the grandfather of Indian tennis', Misra was initiated into the game by his father Sir L. P. Misra, then Chief Commissioner of Indian Railways. As a 14-year-old, his favourite turf was the Calcutta South Club. That's where Misra met his contemporaries, Narendra Nath, Man Mohan Lal and Dilip Bose. However, Misra was the only one to participate in the junior national championship, the national championship and national veteran championship.

He was secretary of the All India Tennis Association (AITA, then known as AILTA) from 1963 to 1966 and on the Committee of Management of ITF (International Tennis Federation) during 1965–67.

Misra died on 3 September 2011. He was 88 years old.

Besides tennis, he was an accomplished player in squash racquets, and in later years a golfer with a handicap of 8. "Then, sports was seen as a hobby," recalls Misra, who retired from Indian Aluminium as General Coordination Manager over two decades ago. He lived in New Delhi with his wife, Sharda Misra and younger daughter. His elder son Gaurav Misra is a former national tennis champion and is the director of the Columbia University's Dick Savitt Tennis Center tennis in New York City, New York.
