= Mahmoud Alam =

Pakistani tennis player

- Country (sports): Pakistan
- Residence: Pakistan
- Born: Aligarh, United Provinces; British India

Singles
- Career record: 1–5
- Career titles: 0

Grand Slam singles results
- Australian Open: -
- French Open: -
- Wimbledon: 2nd (1948)
- US Open: -

Doubles
- Career record: 0–2
- Career titles: 0
- Last updated on: January 7, 2007.

Mahmoud Alam (born in Aligarh, British India) is a former tennis player from Pakistan, who represented the country in the Davis Cup and also played at Wimbledon.

== Wimbledon ==
He is the first Pakistani to reach the second round in 1948 at Wimbledon during the pre-open era. He was one of two Pakistanis at the tournament.

Scores

- 1st round: defeated Bela Peto of Hungary, 6–3, 5–7, 6–4, 6–3.
- 2nd round: lost to Egyptian Marcel Coen 7–9 4–6, 7–5, 3–6.

== Davis Cup ==
Alam represented Pakistan in 2 ties in 1948 against Switzerland and in 1950 against Philippines. His overall record was 0–6.

- Singles: 0–4
- Doubles: 0–2

== Background and family life ==
His father, Mehboob Alam, was the captain of Aligarh's hockey team from 1914 - 1918. His daughter, Sheherezade Alam, is a celebrated ceramist and son-in-law, Zahoor ul Akhlaq was a painter. He also has two sons, Asad and Shaban.
