= Paddy Roberts (tennis) =

British tennis player

- Full name: Arthur Gordon Roberts
- Country (sports): United Kingdom
- Born: 21 November 1929
- Plays: Right-handed

Grand Slam singles results
- French Open: 3R (1951)
- Wimbledon: 2R (1948, 1949, 1950)

Arthur Gordon "Paddy" Roberts (born 21 November 1929) is a British former professional tennis player. He is the son of tennis coach Arthur Roberts Sr, who guided Sue Barker and Angela Mortimer to grand slam titles.

Roberts, native of Torquay, was British junior champion in 1946 and 1947. As an 18-year-old in 1948 he had an upset win over France's number five ranked player Roger Duboc at the British Hard Court Championships. He progressed to win titles at Cheltenham and Exmouth amongst others over the next few years. In 1951 he featured for the Great Britain Davis Cup team in a tie against France and lost his reverse singles match to Bernard Destremau in five sets. Later in the year he had a close loss to Eric Sturgess in the final of the Scottish Championships. In 1952 he opted to turn professional. He was a two-time winner of the British Professional Championships.

== See also ==
- List of Great Britain Davis Cup team representatives
