= Hans Redl =

Austrian tennis player (1914–1976)

- Country (sports): Austria Germany
- Born: January 19, 1914 Vienna, Austria
- Died: 1976 (aged 61–62) Vienna, Austria
- Plays: Right-handed

Singles

Grand Slam singles results
- Wimbledon: 4R (1947)

Doubles

Grand Slam doubles results
- Wimbledon: QF (1953)

Grand Slam mixed doubles results
- Wimbledon: 2R (1947, 1948, 1949, 1956)

Hans Redl (January 19, 1914 – May 26, 1976) was an Austrian tennis player and administrator who played at the highest level despite the loss of his left arm in World War II.

== Biography ==
Born in Vienna on January 19, 1914, he rose to become one of Austria's best tennis players in the late 1930s. He made his debut in the Austrian Davis Cup team in 1937, scoring his country's only point in their 3–1 defeat by Germany.

After the annexation of Austria by the German Reich in 1938, Redl was conscripted into the German army and was sent to the Eastern Front. During the Siege of Stalingrad he was badly wounded and had his left arm amputated at the shoulder. After rehabilitation from his injury, he developed an adjusted serving technique to allow him to continue playing; instead of throwing the ball up with his free hand, he would rest the ball on the racquet face, flipping it in the air before serving as normal. Although this was against the rules, (Note: The ITF Rules of Tennis (Rule 16) specify that "The server shall ... release the ball by hand in any direction and hit the ball with the racket before the ball hits the ground.") he was given special dispensation because of his handicap.

Redl was invited to compete at Wimbledon in 1947, and made ten consecutive appearances at The Championships, winning eight matches in singles. His best result was in his debut year, when he reached the fourth round before being defeated by eighth seed and future champion Bob Falkenburg. In the doubles, he and partner Freddie Huber reached the quarter-finals in 1953, taking a set off eventual champions Lew Hoad and Ken Rosewall before the Australians triumphed.

After his retirement, Redl continued to play seniors tennis as late as 1968. He also became an administrator, eventually serving as President of the Austrian Tennis Federation. He died in Vienna in 1976.

== Performance timeline ==
Key
W	F	SF	QF	#R	RR	Q#	DNQ	A	NH

(W) winner; (F) finalist; (SF) semifinalist; (QF) quarterfinalist; (#R) rounds 4, 3, 2, 1; (RR) round-robin stage; (Q#) qualification round; (DNQ) did not qualify; (A) absent; (NH) not held; (SR) strike rate (events won / competed); (W–L) win–loss record.

Tournament	1947	1948	1949	1950	1951	1952	1953	1954	1955	1956
Grand Slam tournaments
Australian	A	A	A	A	A	A	A	A	A	A
French	A	A	A	A	A	A	A	A	A	A
Wimbledon	4R	2R	1R	1R	2R	1R	3R	1R	2R	1R
U.S.	A	A	A	A	A	A	A	A	A	A
