= Guy Jackson (tennis) =

Irish tennis player and businessman

- Country (sports): (Republic of Ireland) Ireland
- Born: 20 September 1921
- Died: 18 June 1972 (aged 50) near Staines, England, United Kingdom

Singles

Grand Slam singles results
- Wimbledon: 2R (1948, 1949, 1952)

Guy Jackson (20 September 1921 – 18 June 1972) was a tennis player and businessman from Ireland.

== Career ==
Jackson competed at the Wimbledon Championships on eight occasions, in 1947, 1948, 1949, 1951, 1952, 1953, 1954 and 1960. He made the second round three times.

In the Davis Cup, Jackson took part in 15 ties, the first in 1948 and last in 1964. He won nine singles rubbers and four doubles matches for Ireland.

== Staines air disaster ==
Jackson, an executive with Guinness Brewery, was one of 12 Irish senior businessmen on board British European Airways Flight 548, which crashed near the town of Staines. There were no survivors.
