= Don Butler (tennis) =

British tennis player

- Full name: Donald William Butler
- Country (sports): United Kingdom
- Born: 19 March 1910
- Plays: Right-handed

Singles

Grand Slam singles results
- French Open: 3R (1938)
- Wimbledon: 4R (1936, 1939)

Doubles

Grand Slam doubles results
- Wimbledon: QF (1939)

Grand Slam mixed doubles results
- Wimbledon: QF (1946, 1948)

Donald William Butler (19 March 1910 — date of death unknown) was a British tennis player.

A player from Worcestershire, Butler was a three-time singles champion in Eastbourne. He had his best period on tour in the late 1930s, twice reaching the fourth round at Wimbledon. In 1938 he won the All England Plate.

Butler is the only person to play Davis Cup for Great Britain both before and after World War II. He featured in two ties in 1938, then at the age of 37 in 1947 received another call up, picked over Derrick Barton who was 12 years his junior.

== See also ==
- List of Great Britain Davis Cup team representatives
