= Cyril Kemp (tennis) =

Irish tennis player

- Full name: Cyril Aubrey Kemp
- Country (sports): Ireland
- Born: 12 June 1915
- Died: 25 December 2010 (aged 95)

Singles

Grand Slam singles results
- Wimbledon: 3R (1948)

Doubles

Grand Slam doubles results
- Wimbledon: 3R (1949)

Grand Slam mixed doubles results
- Wimbledon: 4R (1946)

Cyril Aubrey Kemp (12 June 1915 — 25 December 2010) was an Irish tennis player active in the 1930s, 1940s and 1950s. He was also a national representative in the sports of squash and table tennis.

The son of an all-round sportsman, Kemp had his best period on the tennis tour in the late 1940s, debuting for the Ireland Davis Cup team in 1946. He made 9 Davis Cup appearances for Ireland from 1946 to 1952. He was singles runner-up at the Irish championships in 1946 and 1947, and won the event in 1950. His run at the 1947 Irish championships included an upset semi-final win over Tom Brown, who was fresh off making a Wimbledon final. In 1948 he won through to the third round at Wimbledon, before losing to the top seeded Frank Parker.

Alice Marble (USA), the greatest woman player of her day, came to Dublin in 1939 to compete in the Irish Championships at Fitzwilliam Lawn Tennis Club and during her stay played an exhibition match against Kemp. Marble, who in the week before her appearance in Dublin had become the first woman of the century to win the Triple Crown at Wimbledon — the Mixed Doubles, the Ladies' Doubles, and the Ladies' Singles titles — won the hard-fought match 9-7, 8-6. A full account of the match can be found in the Irish Times edition of 14 July 1939.

== See also ==
- List of Ireland Davis Cup team representatives
