= 1948 Wimbledon Championships =

- Date: 21 June – 3 July
- Edition: 62nd
- Category: Grand Slam
- Surface: Grass
- Location: Church Road; SW19, Wimbledon, London, United Kingdom
- Venue: All England Lawn Tennis and Croquet Club

Champions

Men's singles
- (Brazil) Bob Falkenburg

Women's singles
- (United States) Louise Brough

Men's doubles
- (Australia) John Bromwich / (Australia) Frank Sedgman

Women's doubles
- (United States) Louise Brough / (United States) Margaret duPont

Mixed doubles
- (Australia) John Bromwich / (United States) Louise Brough

Boys' singles
- (Sweden) Staffan Stockenberg

Girls' singles
- (Czechoslovakia) Olga Mišková
← 1947 ·	Wimbledon Championships	· 1949 →

The 1948 Wimbledon Championships took place on the outdoor grass courts at the All England Lawn Tennis and Croquet Club in Wimbledon, London, United Kingdom. The tournament was held from Monday 21 June until Saturday 3 July. It was the 62nd staging of the Wimbledon Championships, and the third Grand Slam tennis event of 1948. Bob Falkenburg and Louise Brough won the singles titles.

== Finals ==
=== Seniors ===
==== Men's singles ====
(Brazil) Bob Falkenburg defeated (Australia) John Bromwich, 7–5, 0–6, 6–2, 3–6, 7–5

==== Women's singles ====
(United States) Louise Brough defeated (United States) Doris Hart, 6–3, 8–6

==== Men's doubles ====
(Australia) John Bromwich / (Australia) Frank Sedgman defeated (United States) Tom Brown / (United States) Gardnar Mulloy, 5–7, 7–5, 7–5, 9–7

==== Women's doubles ====
(United States) Louise Brough / (United States) Margaret Osborne duPont defeated (United States) Doris Hart / (United States) Patricia Todd, 6–3, 3–6, 6–3

==== Mixed doubles ====
(Australia) John Bromwich / (United States) Louise Brough defeated (United States) Doris Hart / (Australia) Frank Sedgman, 6–2, 3–6, 6–3

=== Juniors ===
==== Boys' singles ====
(Sweden) Staffan Stockenberg defeated (Hungary) Dezső Vad, 6–0, 6–8, 5–7, 6–4, 6–2

==== Girls' singles ====
(Czechoslovakia) Olga Mišková defeated (Switzerland) Violette Rigollet, 6–4, 6–2

Preceded by 1948 French Championships	Grand Slams	Succeeded by 1948 U.S. National Championships
