= Boebi van Meegeren =

Dutch tennis player

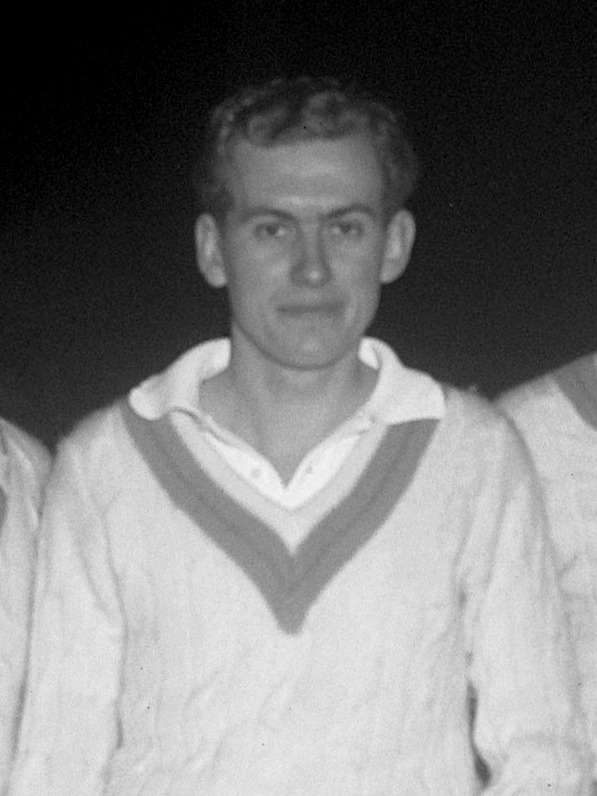
Boebi van Meegeren in 1951

Robert Andre Lothar van Meegeren (20 August 1924 – December 2017), variously known as "Boebi", "Robert" or "Rob", was a Dutch tennis player.

He competed in the 1946, 1948, 1949, 1950, and 1953 Wimbledon Championships, reaching the second round once in 1950. He also competed in the 1948, 1949, 1950, 1952, 1954, and 1955 French Championships, where in 1948 and 1949 he reached the third round. Van Meegeren played in six ties for the Netherlands in the Davis Cup from 1948 to 1954. Van Meegeren won an international tournament in Ostend in 1948 and in the same year the British Hard Court doubles with Eric Sturgess.

After his career he became the owner of a tennis club in the Marlot neighborhood of The Hague He died in December 2017, at the age of 93.
