= Vladimír Černík =

Czech tennis player (1917–2002)

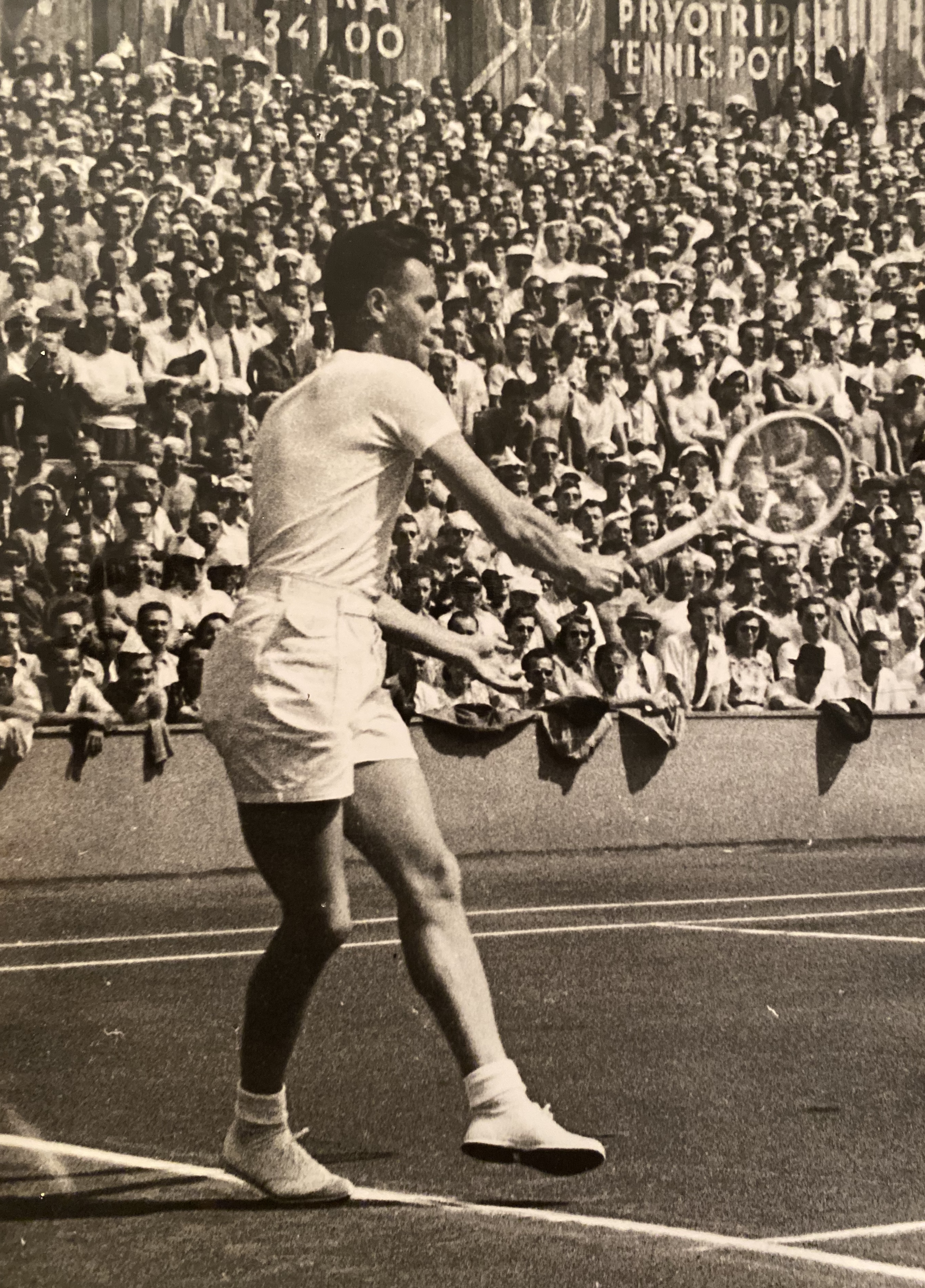
- Country (sports): Czechoslovakia; Egypt
- Born: 9 July 1917 Roudnice nad Labem, Czechoslovakia
- Died: 2 April 2002 (aged 84) Palm Beach, Florida, U.S.

Singles

Grand Slam singles results
- French Open: 4R (1951)
- Wimbledon: 4R (1949)
- US Open: 2R (1947, 1949)

Team competitions
- Davis Cup: Inter-Zonal Final (1947, 1948)

Vladimír Černík (9 July 1917 – 2 April 2002) was a Czech tennis player who represented Czechoslovakia and later Egypt. He was a mainstay of his country's Davis Cup team in the years immediately following World War II, helping them reach the Inter-Zonal final in successive years in 1947 and 1948, though they fell to Australia on both occasions. His biggest individual tournament victories in singles were his two Swiss International Championships in 1946 and 1950.

In July 1949, he and Davis Cup team-mate Jaroslav Drobný defected while attending that year's Swiss Championships in Gstaad. He continued to tour the amateur tennis circuit thereafter, first with Swiss papers until in 1950 he and Drobný were both granted Egyptian citizenship. Subsequently Černík was able to settle in the United States, and worked for two years as the head coach of the Tar Heels, the men's tennis programme at the University of North Carolina.

In later life Černík retired to Palm Beach, Florida, where he was the Tennis Professional at the Everglades Club. He died in 2002.

== Performance timeline ==
Key
W	F	SF	QF	#R	RR	Q#	DNQ	A	NH

(W) winner; (F) finalist; (SF) semifinalist; (QF) quarterfinalist; (#R) rounds 4, 3, 2, 1; (RR) round-robin stage; (Q#) qualification round; (DNQ) did not qualify; (A) absent; (NH) not held; (SR) strike rate (events won / competed); (W–L) win–loss record.

Tournament	1947	1948	1949	1950	1951
Grand Slam tournaments
Australian	A	A	A	A	A
French	2R	A	A	2R	4R
Wimbledon	2R	3R	4R	1R	2R
U.S.	2R	1R	2R	A	A
