= Lennart Bergelin =

Swedish tennis player and coach

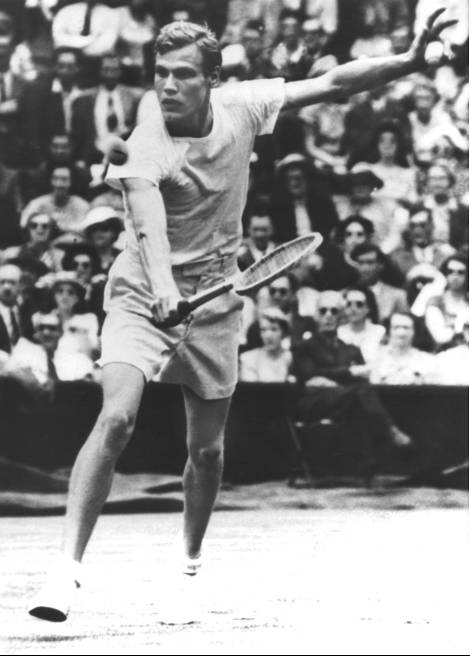
- Bergelin in 1950
- Country (sports): Sweden
- Born: 10 June 1925 Alingsås, Sweden
- Died: 4 November 2008 (aged 83) Stockholm, Sweden
- Turned pro: 1946 (amateur tour)
- Retired: 1955 (played sporadically afterwards)

Singles
- Career record: 212–94, (69.3%)
- Career titles: 25
- Highest ranking: No. 9 (1948, John Olliff)

Grand Slam singles results
- Australian Open: QF (1955)
- French Open: QF (1948, 1951)
- Wimbledon: QF (1946, 1948, 1951)
- US Open: 3R (1954)

Doubles
- Career record: 0–2

Grand Slam doubles results
- French Open: W (1948)
- Wimbledon: SF (1948)

Sven Lennart Bergelin (10 June 1925 – 4 November 2008) was a Swedish tennis player and coach. As a player, for AIK, Bergelin won nine Swedish championship singles titles from 1945 to 1955 as well as the French Open doubles title in 1948. Bergelin is best known for his work with Björn Borg, whom he trained from 1971 to 1983, helping him to win 11 Grand Slam tournaments. Bergelin also was the captain for Sweden's team when it won its first Davis Cup title.

== Early life ==
Bergelin was born on 10 June 1925 in Alingas.

== Tennis career ==
From 1946 to 1955, Bergelin was ranked among the top 10 amateur players in the world, reaching world no. 9 in John Olliff's 1948 amateur rankings. He won 20 national championships (nine singles and 11 doubles) and became the first Swedish player ever to win a Grand Slam when he and Jaroslav Drobný won the French doubles championship in 1948. Bergelin played 83 Davis Cup matches representing Sweden and won 63 of these. He played his last Davis Cup at the age of 40. From 1971 to 1976, Bergelin was the captain of Sweden's Davis Cup team and, in 1975, he led them to victory as they defeated Czechoslovakia in the finals.

Bergelin was awarded the Svenska Dagbladet Gold Medal in 1950.

== Coaching career ==
From 1974 to 1983, with Bergelin as his coach, Björn Borg won 11 Grand Slam titles (six French Open and five Wimbledon) of 16 Grand Slam finals. During this period, he helped Borg become the first player in the Open Era to win three majors without dropping a set.

== Death ==
Bergelin died on 4 November 2008. He was 83.

According to Peter Bengtsson, a spokesman for the Swedish Tennis Association, he died from heart failure at a Stockholm hospital.

== Grand Slam finals ==
=== Doubles (1 title) ===
Result	Year	Championship	Surface	Partner	Opponents	Score
Win	1948	French Championships	Clay	(Czechoslovakia) Jaroslav Drobný	(Australia) Harry Hopman (Australia) Frank Sedgman	8–6, 6–1, 12–10

== See also ==
- List of Sweden Davis Cup team representatives

Preceded by Gert Fredriksson	Svenska Dagbladet Gold Medal; 1950	Succeeded by Rune Larsson
