= Alejo Russell =

Argentine tennis player

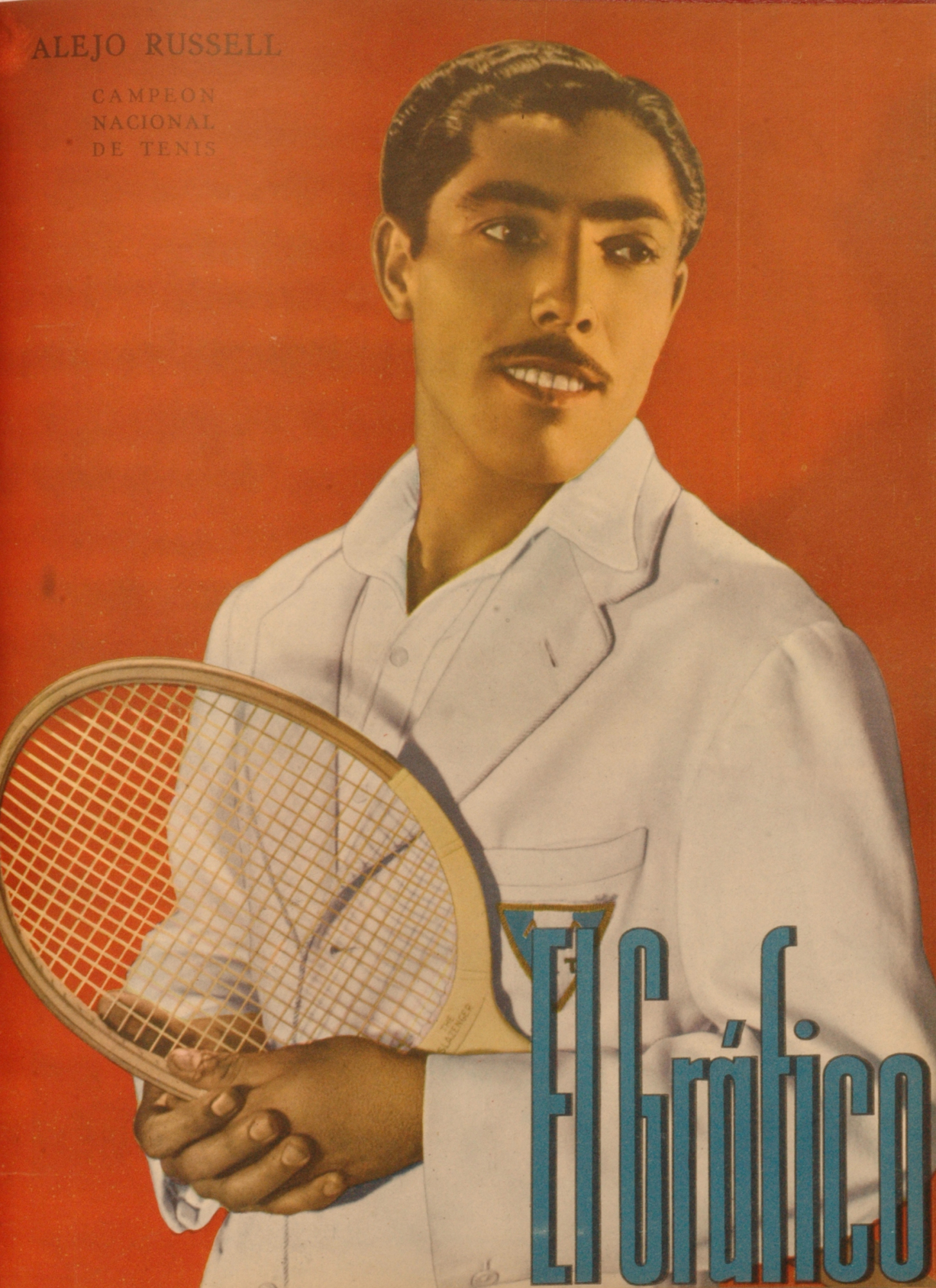
- Full name: Alejandro Domingo Russell
- Country (sports): Argentina
- Born: 9 September 1916; Córdoba, Argentina
- Died: 25 May 1977 (aged 60); Bayonne, France
- Turned pro: 1936 (amateur)
- Retired: 1955
- Plays: Right-handed (one-handed backhand)

Singles
- Career record: 149–54
- Career titles: 19

Grand Slam singles results
- French Open: 3R (1952)
- Wimbledon: 4R (1939)
- US Open: QF (1942, 1945)

Doubles
- Career record: 0–0

Grand Slam doubles results
- Wimbledon: QF (1948, 1952)

Mixed doubles

Grand Slam mixed doubles results
- Wimbledon: SF (1938)
- US Open: F (1942)

Team competitions
- Davis Cup: F^{Am} (1958)

Alejo Domingo Russell (9 September 1916 – 25 May 1977) was an Argentine tennis player who competed in the 1930s, 1940s and 1950s.

Russell had "a strong and well-proportioned physique and invariably hit all the balls that came to him from his opponent with unusual violence." He also adapted to the circumstances of the game and hit both the drive and the backhand with absolute control.

He reached the quarterfinals of the U.S. National Championships in 1942 and 1945 and was a finalist in the mixed doubles in 1942 (partnering Patricia Todd). One of his early tournament victories in South America in 1939 was over a young Pancho Segura. He was No. 1 in the Argentine national rankings for five years.

He died of a heart attack whilst playing a tennis match in Bayonne, France, in 1977, aged 60.

== Grand Slam finals ==
=== Mixed doubles: (1 runners-up) ===
Result	Year	Championship	Surface	Partner	Opponents	Score
Loss	1942	U.S. Championships	Grass	(United States) Patricia Canning Todd	(United States) Louise Brough (United States) Ted Schroeder	6–3, 1–6, 4–6
