= 1949 Davis Cup Europe Zone =

International tennis competition

Details
- Duration: 28 April 1949 – 25 July 1949
- Teams: 24
- Categories: 1949 Davis Cup Europe Zone; 1949 Davis Cup America Zone

Champion
- Winning nation: Italy; Qualified for: 1949 Davis Cup; Inter-Zonal Final

The Europe Zone was one of the two regional zones of the 1949 Davis Cup.

24 teams entered the Europe Zone, with the winner going on to compete in the Inter-Zonal Final against the winner of the America Zone. Italy defeated France in the final, and went on to face Australia in the Inter-Zonal Final.

== Draw ==
First Round; 28 April–3 May
Switzerland
bye
Greece
bye
Hungary
bye
Belgium
bye
Denmark	5
Israel	0
Luxembourg	0
France	5
Portugal	0
Great Britain	5
Czechoslovakia	5
Monaco	0
Netherlands	0
South Africa	5
Italy	w/o
Turkey
Ireland	2
Chile	3
Egypt	w/o
Argentina
bye
Sweden
bye
Norway
bye
Austria
bye
Yugoslavia

Second Round; 6–17 May
Switzerland	w/o
Greece
Budapest, Hungary
Hungary	4
Belgium	1
Paris, France (clay)
Denmark	1
France	4
Wimbledon, England (grass)
Great Britain	1
Czechoslovakia	4
Milan, Italy (clay)
South Africa	1
Italy	4
Birmingham, England (grass)
Chile	3
Egypt	2
Stockholm, Sweden (clay)
Sweden	5
Norway	0
Vienna, Austria
Austria	1
Yugoslavia	4

Quarterfinals; 9–16 June
Budapest, Hungary
Switzerland	0
Hungary	5
Paris, France (clay)
France	3
Czechoslovakia	2
Turin, Italy (clay)
Italy	4
Chile	1
Zagreb, Yugoslavia (clay)
Sweden	2
Yugoslavia	3

Semifinals; 8–11 July
Budapest, Hungary
Hungary	2
France	3
Rome, Italy (clay)
Italy	4
Yugoslavia	1

Final; 23–25 July
Paris, France (clay)
France	2
Italy	3

== First round ==
=== Denmark vs. Israel ===
Denmark
5
Copenhagen, Denmark
28–30 April 1949
Clay

Israel
0

			1	2	3	4	5
1	(Denmark) (Israel)	Kurt Nielsen; Arie Avidan-Weiss	6; 1	6; 2	6; 1
2	(Denmark) (Israel)	Torben Ulrich; Yehuda Finkelkraut	6; 0	6; 1	6; 2
3	(Denmark) (Israel)	Kurt Nielsen / Torben Ulrich; Yehuda Finkelkraut / Rafael Gornitsky	6; 2	6; 3	6; 0
4	(Denmark) (Israel)	Torben Ulrich; Arie Avidan-Weiss	6; 4	3; 6	1; 6	6; 0	6; 3
5	(Denmark) (Israel)	Kurt Nielsen; Yehuda Finkelkraut	6; 1	6; 3	6; 1

=== Luxembourg vs. France ===
Luxembourg
0
Mondorf-les-Bains, Luxembourg
29 April–1 May 1949

France
5

			1	2	3	4	5
1	(Luxembourg) (France)	Géza Wertheim; Paul Rémy	0; 6	1; 6	1; 6
2	(Luxembourg) (France)	Gaston Wampach; Robert Abdesselam	1; 6	2; 6	5; 7
3	(Luxembourg) (France)	Gaston Wampach / Géza Wertheim; Henri Bolleli / Paul Rémy	2; 6	1; 6	1; 6
4	(Luxembourg) (France)	Géza Wertheim; Henri Bolleli	0; 6	2; 6	1; 6
5	(Luxembourg) (France)	Gaston Wampach; Paul Rémy	1; 6	3; 6	7; 5	3; 6

=== Portugal vs. Great Britain ===
Portugal
0
Estádio Nacional, Lisbon, Portugal
29 April–1 May 1949
Clay

Great Britain
5

			1	2	3	4	5
1	(Portugal) (United Kingdom)	José Roquette; Tony Mottram	6; 8	3; 6	5; 7
2	(Portugal) (United Kingdom)	José da Silva; Geoffrey Paish	4; 6	1; 6	3; 6
3	(Portugal) (United Kingdom)	José Roquette / José da Silva; Tony Mottram / Geoffrey Paish	0; 6	2; 6	1; 6
4	(Portugal) (United Kingdom)	José Roquette; Tim Lewis	2; 6	6; 1	1; 6	5; 7
5	(Portugal) (United Kingdom)	José da Silva; Tony Mottram	5; 7	6; 3	5; 7	0; 6

=== Czechoslovakia vs. Monaco ===
Czechoslovakia
5
Prague, Czechoslovakia
30 April–2 May 1949

Monaco
0

			1	2	3	4	5
1	(Czechoslovakia) (Monaco)	Jaroslav Drobný; Georges Pasquier	6; 0	6; 1	6; 0
2	(Czechoslovakia) (Monaco)	Vladimír Černík; Aleco Noghès	6; 3	6; 2	6; 2
3	(Czechoslovakia) (Monaco)	Vladimír Černík / Jaroslav Drobný; Aleco Noghès / Georges Pasquier	6; 1	6; 2	6; 0
4	(Czechoslovakia) (Monaco)	Vladimír Černík; Georges Pasquier	6; 1	6; 0	6; 4
5	(Czechoslovakia) (Monaco)	Jaroslav Drobný; Aleco Noghès	6; 2	6; 2	6; 1

=== Netherlands vs. South Africa ===
Netherlands
0
Scheveningen, Netherlands
30 April–2 May 1949
Clay

South Africa
5

			1	2	3	4	5
1	(Netherlands) (South Africa)	Hans van Swol; Eric Sturgess	4; 6	3; 6	2; 6
2	(Netherlands) (South Africa)	Boebi van Meegeren; Eustace Fannin	3; 6	2; 6	4; 6
3	(Netherlands) (South Africa)	Ivo Rinkel / Hans van Swol; Eustace Fannin / Eric Sturgess	5; 7	3; 6	4; 6
4	(Netherlands) (South Africa)	Boebi van Meegeren; Eric Sturgess	2; 6	3; 6	1; 6
5	(Netherlands) (South Africa)	John Linck; Sydney Levy	4; 6	3; 6	4; 6

=== Ireland vs. Chile ===
Ireland
2
Fitzwilliam Lawn Tennis Club, Dublin, Ireland
30 April–3 May 1949
Grass

Chile
3

			1	2	3	4	5
1	(Republic of Ireland) (Chile)	Cyril Kemp; Marcelo Taverne	6; 3	4; 6	6; 4	6; 3
2	(Republic of Ireland) (Chile)	Guy Jackson; Ricardo Balbiers	2; 6	6; 4	3; 6	0; 6
3	(Republic of Ireland) (Chile)	Guy Jackson / Cyril Kemp; Ricardo Balbiers / Marcelo Taverne	2; 6	3; 6	4; 6
4	(Republic of Ireland) (Chile)	Cyril Kemp; Ricardo Balbiers	8; 10	8; 10	4; 6
5	(Republic of Ireland) (Chile)	Guy Jackson; Marcelo Taverne	6; 1	6; 3	6; 2

== Second round ==
=== Hungary vs. Belgium ===
Hungary
4
Budapest, Hungary
14–17 May 1949

Belgium
1

			1	2	3	4	5
1	(Hungary) (Belgium)	József Asbóth; Philippe Washer	6; 2	6; 1	6; 3
2	(Hungary) (Belgium)	András Ádám-Stolpa; Jacques Peten	6; 0	8; 6	3; 6	6; 1
3	(Hungary) (Belgium)	András Ádám-Stolpa / József Asbóth; Jacques Brichant / Philippe Washer	6; 1	3; 6	7; 5	6; 4
4	(Hungary) (Belgium)	József Asbóth; Jacques Peten	6; 3	6; 1	6; 3
5	(Hungary) (Belgium)	Zoltán Katona; Jacques Brichant	4; 6	4; 6	6; 0	4; 6

=== France vs. Denmark ===
France
4
Stade Roland Garros, Paris, France
13–15 May 1949
Clay

Denmark
1

			1	2	3	4	5
1	(France) (Denmark)	Robert Abdesselam; Torben Ulrich	6; 0	6; 3	6; 0
2	(France) (Denmark)	Marcel Bernard; Kurt Nielsen	3; 6	11; 9	6; 3	6; 3
3	(France) (Denmark)	Marcel Bernard / Henri Bolleli; Erik Bjerre / Kurt Nielsen	6; 3	6; 4	6; 4
4	(France) (Denmark)	Robert Abdesselam; Kurt Nielsen	4; 6	6; 3	5; 7	4; 6
5	(France) (Denmark)	Jacques Thomas; Erik Bjerre	3; 6	6; 4	6; 0	6; 0

=== Great Britain vs. Czechoslovakia ===
Great Britain
1
No. 1 Court, All England Club, Wimbledon, England
14–17 May 1949
Grass

Czechoslovakia
4

			1	2	3	4	5
1	(United Kingdom) (Czechoslovakia)	Tony Mottram; Jaroslav Drobný	4; 6	3; 6	6; 8
2	(United Kingdom) (Czechoslovakia)	Geoffrey Paish; Vladimír Černík	3; 6	6; 2	4; 6	4; 6
3	(United Kingdom) (Czechoslovakia)	Tony Mottram / Geoffrey Paish; Vladimír Černík / Jaroslav Drobný	3; 6	3; 6	1; 6
4	(United Kingdom) (Czechoslovakia)	Geoffrey Paish; Jaroslav Drobný	3; 6	0; 6	3; 6
5	(United Kingdom) (Czechoslovakia)	Tony Mottram; Vladimír Černík	6; 2	6; 4	6; 4

=== Italy vs. South Africa ===
Italy
4
Milan, Italy
13–15 May 1949
Clay

South Africa
1

			1	2	3	4	5
1	(Italy) (South Africa)	Giovanni Cucelli; Eustace Fannin	7; 5	7; 5	6; 3
2	(Italy) (South Africa)	Vanni Canepele; Eric Sturgess	3; 6	1; 6	4; 6
3	(Italy) (South Africa)	Marcello del Bello / Giovanni Cucelli; Eustace Fannin / Eric Sturgess	6; 3	7; 9	10; 8	2; 6	8; 6
4	(Italy) (South Africa)	Vanni Canepele; Eustace Fannin	6; 4	7; 5	6; 4
5	(Italy) (South Africa)	Giovanni Cucelli; Eric Sturgess	6; 1	2; 6	6; 0	6; 4

=== Chile vs. Egypt ===
Chile
3
Edgbaston Lawn Tennis Club, Birmingham, England
14–17 May 1949
Grass

Egypt
2

			1	2	3	4	5
1	(Chile) (Egypt)	Ricardo Balbiers; Adli El Shafei	6; 0	6; 2	6; 2
2	(Chile) (Egypt)	Marcelo Taverne; Marcel Coen	3; 6	4; 6	2; 6
3	(Chile) (Egypt)	Ricardo Balbiers / Marcelo Taverne; Marcel Coen / Mahmoud Talaat	6; 4	6; 2	6; 4
4	(Chile) (Egypt)	Marcelo Taverne; Adli El Shafei	3; 6	9; 11	9; 11
5	(Chile) (Egypt)	Ricardo Balbiers; Marcel Coen	2; 6	6; 4	8; 6	6; 1

=== Sweden vs. Norway ===
Sweden
5
Tennisstadion, Stockholm, Sweden
13–15 May 1949
Clay

Norway
0

			1	2	3	4	5
1	(Sweden) (Norway)	Lennart Bergelin; Nils-Erik Hessen	6; 4	6; 1	6; 3
2	(Sweden) (Norway)	Torsten Johansson; Jan Staubo	6; 0	6; 3	6; 3
3	(Sweden) (Norway)	Lennart Bergelin / Torsten Johansson; Nils-Erik Hessen / Jan Staubo	6; 4	6; 4	6; 4
4	(Sweden) (Norway)	Torsten Johansson; Nils-Erik Hessen	6; 1	6; 2	6; 3
5	(Sweden) (Norway)	Lennart Bergelin; Jan Staubo	6; 1	4; 6	6; 4	6; 4

=== Austria vs. Yugoslavia ===
Austria
1
Vienna, Austria
6–8 May 1949

Yugoslavia
4

			1	2	3	4	5
1	(Austria) (Socialist Federal Republic of Yugoslavia)	Ljubomir Czajkowsky; Dragutin Mitić	2; 6	2; 6	2; 6
2	(Austria) (Socialist Federal Republic of Yugoslavia)	Hans Redl; Milan Branović	6; 3	6; 4	1; 6	4; 6	6; 4
3	(Austria) (Socialist Federal Republic of Yugoslavia)	Hans Hardwich / Hans Redl; Dragutin Mitić / Josip Palada	1; 6	1; 6	4; 6
4	(Austria) (Socialist Federal Republic of Yugoslavia)	Ljubomir Czajkowsky; Milan Branović	4; 6	3; 6	4; 6
5	(Austria) (Socialist Federal Republic of Yugoslavia)	Hans Redl; Dragutin Mitić	9; 11	7; 5	2; 6	7; 5	6; 8

== Quarterfinals ==
=== Hungary vs. Switzerland ===
Hungary
5
Budapest, Hungary
9–11 June 1949

Switzerland
0

			1	2	3	4	5
1	(Hungary) (Switzerland)	József Asbóth; Max Albrecht	6; 3	6; 3	5; 7	6; 0
2	(Hungary) (Switzerland)	András Ádám-Stolpa; Hans Huonder	6; 1	0; 6	6; 4	7; 5
3	(Hungary) (Switzerland)	András Ádám-Stolpa / József Asbóth; René Buser / Hans Huonder	3; 6	6; 3	6; 4	7; 5
4	(Hungary) (Switzerland)	András Ádám-Stolpa; Max Albrecht	6; 1	6; 2	7; 5
5	(Hungary) (Switzerland)	József Asbóth; Hans Huonder	6; 1	6; 2	6; 1

=== France vs. Czechoslovakia ===
France
3
Stade Roland Garros, Paris, France
11–13 June 1949
Clay

Czechoslovakia
2

			1	2	3	4	5
1	(France) (Czechoslovakia)	Robert Abdesselam; Vladimír Černík	6; 4	6; 3	2; 6	6; 1
2	(France) (Czechoslovakia)	Marcel Bernard; Jaroslav Drobný	3; 6	6; 3	9; 7	7; 5
3	(France) (Czechoslovakia)	Marcel Bernard / Henri Bolleli; Vladimír Černík / Jaroslav Drobný	6; 4	6; 4	3; 6	4; 6	4; 6
4	(France) (Czechoslovakia)	Marcel Bernard; Vladimír Černík	6; 4	6; 2	6; 1
5	(France) (Czechoslovakia)	Robert Abdesselam; Jaroslav Drobný	4; 6	1; 6	3; 6

=== Italy vs. Chile ===
Italy
4
Turin, Italy
10–12 June 1949
Clay

Chile
1

			1	2	3	4	5
1	(Italy) (Chile)	Giovanni Cucelli; Marcelo Taverne	6; 1	6; 0	6; 4
2	(Italy) (Chile)	Marcello del Bello; Ricardo Balbiers	3; 6	4; 6	6; 4	3; 6
3	(Italy) (Chile)	Marcello del Bello / Giovanni Cucelli; Ricardo Balbiers / Marcelo Taverne	6; 3	6; 3	4; 6	6; 4
4	(Italy) (Chile)	Giovanni Cucelli; Ricardo Balbiers	6; 4	8; 6	7; 5
5	(Italy) (Chile)	Marcello del Bello; Marcelo Taverne	8; 10	6; 0	6; 1			retired

=== Yugoslavia vs. Sweden ===
Yugoslavia
3
Zagreb, Yugoslavia
13–16 June 1949
Clay

Sweden
2

			1	2	3	4	5
1	(Socialist Federal Republic of Yugoslavia) (Sweden)	Josip Palada; Lennart Bergelin	5; 7	6; 3	6; 2	6; 3
2	(Socialist Federal Republic of Yugoslavia) (Sweden)	Dragutin Mitić; Torsten Johansson	4; 6	6; 0	7; 5	3; 6	4; 6
3	(Socialist Federal Republic of Yugoslavia) (Sweden)	Dragutin Mitić / Josip Palada; Lennart Bergelin / Torsten Johansson	6; 2	7; 5	6; 4
4	(Socialist Federal Republic of Yugoslavia) (Sweden)	Josip Palada; Torsten Johansson	6; 4	4; 6	2; 6	6; 4	3; 6
5	(Socialist Federal Republic of Yugoslavia) (Sweden)	Dragutin Mitić; Lennart Bergelin	6; 3	10; 8	6; 4

== Semifinals ==
=== Hungary vs. France ===
Hungary
2
Budapest, Hungary
9–11 July 1949

France
3

			1	2	3	4	5
1	(Hungary) (France)	József Asbóth; Marcel Bernard	3; 6	6; 0	6; 0	6; 3
2	(Hungary) (France)	András Ádám-Stolpa; Robert Abdesselam	1; 6	3; 6	8; 6	8; 6	6; 8
3	(Hungary) (France)	József Asbóth / Kálmán Fehér; Marcel Bernard / Henri Bolleli	1; 6	2; 6	3; 6
4	(Hungary) (France)	András Ádám-Stolpa; Marcel Bernard	2; 6	4; 6	1; 6
5	(Hungary) (France)	József Asbóth; Robert Abdesselam	6; 2	7; 5	9; 7

=== Italy vs. Yugoslavia ===
Italy
4
Foro Italico, Rome, Italy
8–10 July 1949
Clay

Yugoslavia
1

			1	2	3	4	5
1	(Italy) (Socialist Federal Republic of Yugoslavia)	Giovanni Cucelli; Dragutin Mitić	5; 7	6; 2	6; 1	7; 5
2	(Italy) (Socialist Federal Republic of Yugoslavia)	Vanni Canepele; Josip Palada	6; 4	6; 4	6; 1
3	(Italy) (Socialist Federal Republic of Yugoslavia)	Marcello del Bello / Giovanni Cucelli; Dragutin Mitić / Josip Palada	6; 4	6; 0	7; 5
4	(Italy) (Socialist Federal Republic of Yugoslavia)	Marcello del Bello; Josip Palada	6; 3	6; 1	7; 5
5	(Italy) (Socialist Federal Republic of Yugoslavia)	Vanni Canepele; Dragutin Mitić	1; 6	4; 6	3; 6

== Final ==
=== France vs. Italy ===
France
2
Stade Roland Garros, Paris, France
23–25 July 1949
Clay

Italy
3

			1	2	3	4	5
1	(France) (Italy)	Robert Abdesselam; Giovanni Cucelli	6; 1	8; 6	8; 10	4; 6	2; 6
2	(France) (Italy)	Marcel Bernard; Marcello del Bello	6; 4	6; 3	4; 6	2; 6	10; 8
3	(France) (Italy)	Marcel Bernard / Henri Bolleli; Marcello del Bello / Giovanni Cucelli	6; 3	1; 6	6; 4	0; 6	2; 6
4	(France) (Italy)	Robert Abdesselam; Marcello del Bello	6; 3	6; 4	6; 2
5	(France) (Italy)	Marcel Bernard; Giovanni Cucelli	6; 8	6; 3	6; 4	0; 6	1; 6
