= 2012 AAMI Classic =

- 2012 AAMI Classic

Final
- Champion: (Australia) Bernard Tomic
- Runner-up: (United States) Mardy Fish
- Score: 6–4, 3–6, 7–5
← 2011 ·	AAMI Classic	· 2013 →

The 2012 AAMI Classic took place between 11–14 January 2012, at the Kooyong Stadium in Melbourne, Australia.

Lleyton Hewitt was the defending champion, having defeated Gaël Monfils 7–5, 6–3 in the 2011 final, but he competed in the Apia International instead. Following Jo-Wilfried Tsonga's withdrawal, Sam Querrey and Victor Troicki agreed to play in an exhibition match to help fill the schedule. Andy Murray and David Nalbandian also played a match.

Bernard Tomic won in the final against Mardy Fish, 6–4, 3–6, 7–5. He became the youngest person (and first teenager) to win the event.

== Seeds ==
1. (France) Jo-Wilfried Tsonga (first round, withdrew, eighth place)
2. (Czech Republic) Tomáš Berdych (first round, seventh place)
3. (United States) Mardy Fish (final, second place)
4. (United States) Andy Roddick (first round, sixth place)
5. (France) Gaël Monfils (semifinals, fourth place)
6. (Canada) Milos Raonic (first round, withdrew due to stomach illness)
7. (Austria) Jürgen Melzer (semifinals, third place)
8. (Australia) Bernard Tomic (champion, first place)
9. (Japan) Kei Nishikori (replaced Milos Raonic, fifth place)

== Draw ==
=== Key ===
- Q = Qualifier
- WC = Wild card
- LL = Lucky loser
- Alt = Alternate
- SE = Special exempt
- PR = Protected ranking
- ITF = ITF entry
- JE = Junior exempt
- w/o = Walkover
- r = Retired
- d = Defaulted
- SR = Special ranking

=== Main draw ===
First round
1	(France) Jo-Wilfried Tsonga	4	3
7	(Austria) Jürgen Melzer	6	6
6	(Canada) Milos Raonic	1	2
3	(United States) Mardy Fish	6	6
5	(France) Gaël Monfils	7^{7}	7^{7}
4	(United States) Andy Roddick	6^{2}	6^{3}
8	(Australia) Bernard Tomic	4	6	6
2	(Czech Republic) Tomáš Berdych	6	3	4

Semifinals
7	(Austria) Jürgen Melzer	2	6	1
3	(United States) Mardy Fish	6	4	6
5	(France) Gaël Monfils	4	6	6^{2}
8	(Australia) Bernard Tomic	6	4	7^{7}

Final
3	(United States) Mardy Fish	4	6	5
8	(Australia) Bernard Tomic	6	3	7
Third place match
7	(Austria) Jürgen Melzer	6	6^{10}	6
5	(France) Gaël Monfils	3	7^{12}	2

=== Play-offs ===
First round
1	(France) Jo-Wilfried Tsonga	6	4	1
9	(Japan) Kei Nishikori	1	6	6
4	(United States) Andy Roddick	4	7^{7}	6
2	(Czech Republic) Tomáš Berdych	6	6^{5}	3

Fifth place match
9	(Japan) Kei Nishikori	6	6
4	(United States) Andy Roddick	3	3
Seventh place match
1	(France) Jo-Wilfried Tsonga
2	(Czech Republic) Tomáš Berdych	w/o
