= 1946 Davis Cup America Zone =

International tennis competition

The America Zone was one of the two regional zones of the 1946 Davis Cup.

5 teams entered the America Zone, with the winner going on to compete in the Inter-Zonal Final against the winner of the Europe Zone. The United States defeated Mexico in the final, and went on to face Sweden in the Inter-Zonal Final.

== Draw ==
Quarterfinals; 14–16 June
Canada
bye
Mexico
bye
St. Louis, MO, United States (clay)
United States	5
Philippines	0
bye
New Zealand

Semifinals; 13–15 June
Montreal, Canada (grass)
Canada	0
Mexico	5
United States	w/o
New Zealand

Final; 29 June–1 July
South Orange, NJ, United States (grass)
Mexico	0
United States	5

== Quarterfinals ==
=== United States vs. Philippines ===
United States
5
Triple A Club, St. Louis, MO, United States
14–16 June 1946
Clay

Philippines
0

			1	2	3	4	5
1	(United States) (Philippines)	Frank Parker; Felicisimo Ampon	6; 0	6; 0	6; 0
2	(United States) (Philippines)	Bill Talbert; Amado Sánchez	6; 1	6; 3	6; 0
3	(United States) (Philippines)	Gardnar Mulloy / Bill Talbert; Felicisimo Ampon / César Carmona	6; 1	6; 3	6; 1
4	(United States) (Philippines)	Frank Parker; Amado Sánchez	6; 1	6; 4	6; 0
5	(United States) (Philippines)	Ted Schroeder; Felicisimo Ampon	6; 2	6; 4	6; 4

== Semifinals ==
=== Canada vs. Mexico ===
Canada
0
Mount Royal Tennis Club, Montreal, Canada
13–15 June 1946
Grass

Mexico
5

			1	2	3	4	5
1	(Canada) (Mexico)	Brendan Macken; Rolando Vega	4; 6	2; 6	5; 7
2	(Canada) (Mexico)	Henri Rochon; Armando Vega	5; 7	2; 6	4; 6
3	(Canada) (Mexico)	Brendan Macken / Laird Watt; Armando Vega / Rolando Vega	3; 6	4; 6	3; 6
4	(Canada) (Mexico)	Henri Rochon; Rolando Vega	3; 6	6; 8	4; 6
5	(Canada) (Mexico)	Donald McDiarmid; Armando Vega	0; 6	0; 6	3; 6

== Final ==
=== United States vs. Mexico ===
United States
5
Orange Lawn Tennis Club, South Orange, NJ, United States
29 June–1 July 1946
Grass

Mexico
0

			1	2	3	4	5
1	(United States) (Mexico)	Frank Parker; Rolando Vega	6; 0	6; 0	6; 2
2	(United States) (Mexico)	Bill Talbert; Armando Vega	6; 1	6; 2	6; 1
3	(United States) (Mexico)	Gardnar Mulloy / Bill Talbert; Armando Vega / Rolando Vega	6; 0	9; 7	6; 2
4	(United States) (Mexico)	Frank Parker; Armando Vega	6; 3	6; 3	6; 2
5	(United States) (Mexico)	Gardnar Mulloy; Francisco Guerrero Arcocha	6; 3	6; 4	6; 4
