= 1949 Davis Cup America Zone =

International tennis competition

The America Zone was one of the two regional zones of the 1949 Davis Cup.

4 teams entered the America Zone, with the winner going on to compete in the Inter-Zonal Final against the winner of the Europe Zone. Australia defeated Mexico in the final, and went on to face Italy in the Inter-Zonal Final.

== Draw ==
Semifinals; 2–23 July
Montreal, Canada (grass)
Australia	4
Canada	1
Havana, Cuba
Cuba	1
Mexico	4

Final; 29–31 July
Wilmington, DE, United States (grass)
Australia	5
Mexico	0

== Semifinals ==
=== Canada vs. Australia ===
Canada
1
Mount Royal Tennis Club Montreal, Canada
21–23 July 1949
Grass

Australia
4

			1	2	3	4	5
1	(Canada) (Australia)	Brendan Macken; Bill Sidwell	3; 6	7; 5	6; 3	5; 7	8; 6
2	(Canada) (Australia)	Henri Rochon; Frank Sedgman	4; 6	2; 6	2; 6
3	(Canada) (Australia)	Brendan Macken / Walter Stohlberg; John Bromwich / Frank Sedgman	3; 6	2; 6	2; 6
4	(Canada) (Australia)	Brendan Macken; Frank Sedgman	2; 6	2; 6	0; 6
5	(Canada) (Australia)	Lorne Main; Bill Sidwell	6; 8	6; 4	4; 6	1; 6

=== Cuba vs. Mexico ===
Cuba
1
Havana, Cuba
2–4 July 1949

Mexico
4

			1	2	3	4	5
1	(Cuba) (Mexico)	José Agüero; Armando Vega	5; 7	6; 1	1; 6	2; 6
2	(Cuba) (Mexico)	Juan Weiss; Rolando Vega	4; 6	6; 0	0; 6	8; 10
3	(Cuba) (Mexico)	José Agüero / Juan Weiss; Armando Vega / Rolando Vega	3; 6	3; 6	7; 5	4; 6
4	(Cuba) (Mexico)	Jesús Pardo; Miguel Ángel Reyes-Varela	3; 6	0; 6	2; 6
5	(Cuba) (Mexico)	José Agüero; Luis Riefkohl	6; 4	6; 2	6; 4

== Final ==
=== Australia vs. Mexico ===
Australia
5
Wilmington Country Club, Wilmington, DE, United States
29–31 July 1949
Grass

Mexico
0

			1	2	3	4	5
1	(Australia) (Mexico)	Frank Sedgman; Armando Vega	12; 10	4; 6	6; 4	1; 6	6; 3
2	(Australia) (Mexico)	John Bromwich; Rolando Vega	6; 0	6; 2	6; 1
3	(Australia) (Mexico)	John Bromwich / Frank Sedgman; Armando Vega / Rolando Vega	6; 0	6; 4	6; 2
4	(Australia) (Mexico)	John Bromwich; Armando Vega	6; 0	6; 1	6; 4
5	(Australia) (Mexico)	Bill Sidwell; Miguel Ángel Reyes-Varela	6; 2	6; 2	6; 1
