= 2010 AAMI Classic – Draw =

Draw
- 2010 AAMI Classic

Final
- Champion: (Spain) Fernando Verdasco
- Runner-up: (France) Jo-Wilfried Tsonga
- Score: 7–5, 6–3
← 2009 ·	AAMI Classic	· 2011 →

Roger Federer was the defending champion, but chose not to participate this year.

Fernando Verdasco won in the final 7–5, 6–3 against Jo-Wilfried Tsonga.

In an exhibition tournament played apart from the main draw, Bernard Tomic defeated World No. 3 Novak Djokovic in three sets (6–4, 3–6, 7–5).

== Players ==
1. (Serbia) Novak Djokovic (semifinals, third place)
2. (Argentina) Juan Martín del Potro (semifinals, fourth place, withdrew due to wrist injury)
3. (Sweden) Robin Söderling (first round, eighth place, withdrew due to elbow injury)
4. (Spain) Fernando Verdasco (champion, first place)
5. (France) Jo-Wilfried Tsonga (final, second place)
6. (Chile) Fernando González (first round, fifth place)
7. (Germany) Tommy Haas (first round, seventh place)
8. (Croatia) Ivan Ljubičić (first round, sixth place)

== Draw ==
=== Key ===
- Q = Qualifier
- WC = Wild card
- LL = Lucky loser
- Alt = Alternate
- ITF = ITF entry
- PR = Protected ranking
- SR = Special ranking
- SE = Special exempt
- JE = Junior exempt
- JR = Junior Accelerator Programme entrant
- CO = College Accelerator Programme entrant
- NG = Next Gen Accelerator Program entrant
- w/o = Walkover
- r = Retired
- d = Defaulted

=== Main draw ===
First round
1	(Serbia) Novak Djokovic	6	6
7	(Germany) Tommy Haas	2	3
6	(Chile) Fernando González	5	1
4	(Spain) Fernando Verdasco	7	6
3	(Sweden) Robin Söderling	6^{0}	1
5	(France) Jo-Wilfried Tsonga	7^{7}	6
8	(Croatia) Ivan Ljubičić	3	3
2	(Argentina) Juan Martín del Potro	6	6

Semifinals
1	(Serbia) Novak Djokovic	1	2
4	(Spain) Fernando Verdasco	6	6
5	(France) Jo-Wilfried Tsonga	w/o
2	(Argentina) Juan Martín del Potro

Final (First/Second place match)
4	(Spain) Fernando Verdasco	7	6
5	(France) Jo-Wilfried Tsonga	5	3
Third/Fourth place match
1	(Serbia) Novak Djokovic	w/o
2	(Argentina) Juan Martín del Potro

=== Play-offs ===
First round
7	(Germany) Tommy Haas	2	4
6	(Chile) Fernando González	6	6
3	(Sweden) Robin Söderling	4	0^{r}
8	(Croatia) Ivan Ljubičić	6	0

Fifth/Sixth place match
6	(Chile) Fernando González	6	7^{9}
8	(Croatia) Ivan Ljubičić	4	6^{7}
Seventh/Eighth place match
7	(Germany) Tommy Haas	w/o
3	(Sweden) Robin Söderling
