= 1946 Davis Cup Europe Zone =

International sporting competition

Details
- Duration: 2 May 1946 – 17 July 1946
- Teams: 15
- Categories: 1946 Europe Zone; 1946 America Zone

Champion
- Winning nation: Sweden; Qualified for: 1946 Davis Cup; Inter-Zonal Final

The Europe Zone was one of the two regional zones of the 1946 Davis Cup.

15 teams entered the Europe Zone, with the winner going on to compete in the Inter-Zonal Final against the winner of the America Zone. Sweden defeated Yugoslavia in the final, and went on to face the United States in the Inter-Zonal Final.

== Draw ==
First round 2–12 May
Ireland
bye
Stockholm, Sweden (clay)
Sweden	5
Netherlands	0
Brussels, Belgium
Belgium	5
Monaco	0
Copenhagen, Denmark (clay)
Denmark	1
Taiwan	4
Paris, France (clay)
France	5
Great Britain	0
Barcelona, Spain (clay)
Spain	2
Switzerland	3
Zagreb, Yugoslavia
Yugoslavia	5
Egypt	0
Turkey
Czechoslovakia	w/o

Quarterfinals; 24–26 May
Stockholm, Sweden (clay)
Ireland	0
Sweden	5
Brussels, Belgium
Belgium	3
Taiwan	2
Montreux, Switzerland
France	3
Switzerland	2
Prague, Czechoslovakia
Yugoslavia	3
Czechoslovakia	2

Semifinals; 9–14 June
Stockholm, Sweden (clay)
Sweden	4
Belgium	1
Paris, France (clay)
France	2
Yugoslavia	3

Final; 14–17 July
Varberg, Sweden (clay)
Sweden	3
Yugoslavia	2

== First round ==
=== Sweden vs. Netherlands ===
Sweden
5
Tennisstadion, Stockholm, Sweden
10–12 May 1946
Clay

Netherlands
0

			1	2	3	4	5
1	(Sweden) (Netherlands)	Lennart Bergelin; Ivo Rinkel	5; 7	6; 0	6; 4	6; 2
2	(Sweden) (Netherlands)	Torsten Johansson; Hans van Swol	8; 6	6; 4	7; 5
3	(Sweden) (Netherlands)	Lennart Bergelin / Torsten Johansson; Ivo Rinkel / Hans van Swol	6; 4	5; 7	4; 6	7; 5	6; 2
4	(Sweden) (Netherlands)	Lennart Bergelin; Hans van Swol	7; 5	6; 3	6; 1
5	(Sweden) (Netherlands)	Torsten Johansson; Ivo Rinkel	9; 7	6; 1	6; 1

=== Belgium vs. Monaco ===
Belgium
5
Brussels, Belgium
10–12 May 1946

Monaco
0

			1	2	3	4	5
1	(Belgium) (Monaco)	Jacques Van den Eynde; René Gallèpe	6; 0	6; 0	6; 2
2	(Belgium) (Monaco)	Philippe Washer; Vladimir Landau	6; 1	6; 1	6; 1
3	(Belgium) (Monaco)	Pierre Geelhand de Merxem / Philippe Washer; René Gallèpe / Vladimir Landau	6; 1	6; 2	6; 1
4	(Belgium) (Monaco)	Jacques Van den Eynde; Vladimir Landau	6; 2	6; 3	6; 1
5	(Belgium) (Monaco)	Philippe Washer; René Gallèpe	6; 1	6; 0	6; 2

=== Denmark vs. China ===
Denmark
1
Copenhagen, Denmark
10–12 May 1946
Clay

Taiwan
4

			1	2	3	4	5
1	(Denmark) (Taiwan)	Arne Velschow-Rasmussen; Kho Sin-Kie	0; 6	1; 6	0; 6
2	(Denmark) (Taiwan)	Jannik Ipsen; Choy Wai-Chuen	2; 6	2; 6	3; 6
3	(Denmark) (Taiwan)	Jannik Ipsen / Per Thielsen; Choy Wai-Chuen / Kho Sin-Kie	7; 5	2; 6	4; 6	5; 7
4	(Denmark) (Taiwan)	Jannik Ipsen; Kho Sin-Kie	0; 6	1; 6	4; 6
5	(Denmark) (Taiwan)	Erik Bjerre; Kenneth Lo	3; 6	6; 4	6; 1	6; 3

=== France vs. Great Britain ===
France
5
Stade Roland Garros, Paris, France
10–12 May 1946
Clay

Great Britain
0

			1	2	3	4	5
1	(France) (United Kingdom)	Pierre Pellizza; Donald MacPhail	6; 1	6; 2	6; 2
2	(France) (United Kingdom)	Yvon Petra; Derrick Barton	6; 4	6; 4	6; 3
3	(France) (United Kingdom)	Marcel Bernard / Bernard Destremau; Henry Billington / John Olliff	13; 11	4; 6	7; 5	6; 1
4	(France) (United Kingdom)	Pierre Pellizza; Derrick Barton	6; 2	6; 3	6; 1
5	(France) (United Kingdom)	Yvon Petra; Donald MacPhail	6; 0	6; 2	6; 1

=== Spain vs. Switzerland ===
Spain
2
Real Club de Tenis Barcelona, Barcelona, Spain
2–6 May 1946
Clay

Switzerland
3

			1	2	3	4	5
1	(Spain) (Switzerland)	Luis Carles; Hans Huonder	6; 3	6; 4	6; 3
2	(Spain) (Switzerland)	Pedro Castella; Jost Spitzer	0; 6	1; 6	4; 6
3	(Spain) (Switzerland)	Jaime Bartroli / Luis Carles; René Buser / Jost Spitzer	7; 5	6; 8	9; 11	7; 9
4	(Spain) (Switzerland)	Luis Carles; Jost Spitzer	7; 9	7; 5	7; 5	3; 6	6; 2
5	(Spain) (Switzerland)	Pedro Castella; Hans Huonder	6; 3	3; 6	1; 6	6; 4	4; 6

=== Yugoslavia vs. Egypt ===
Yugoslavia
5
Zagreb, Yugoslavia
10–12 May 1946

Egypt
0

			1	2	3	4	5
1	(Socialist Federal Republic of Yugoslavia) (Egypt)	Franjo Punčec; Adli El Shafei	6; 0	6; 1	6; 3
2	(Socialist Federal Republic of Yugoslavia) (Egypt)	Dragutin Mitić; Andre Najar	7; 5	6; 1	6; 3
3	(Socialist Federal Republic of Yugoslavia) (Egypt)	Dragutin Mitić / Josip Palada; Jacques Grandguillot / Mahmoud Talaat	6; 2	6; 4	3; 6	10; 8
4	(Socialist Federal Republic of Yugoslavia) (Egypt)	Josip Palada; Andre Najar	6; 0	6; 1	6; 2
5	(Socialist Federal Republic of Yugoslavia) (Egypt)	Dragutin Mitić; Adli El Shafei	6; 0	6; 1	6; 3

== Quarterfinals ==
=== Sweden vs. Ireland ===
Sweden
5
Tennisstadion, Stockholm, Sweden
24–26 May 1946
Clay

Ireland
0

			1	2	3	4	5
1	(Sweden) (Republic of Ireland)	Lennart Bergelin; Cyril Kemp	2; 6	6; 2	6; 2	6; 4
2	(Sweden) (Republic of Ireland)	Torsten Johansson; Raymond Egan	6; 2	7; 5	1; 6	3; 6	6; 3
3	(Sweden) (Republic of Ireland)	Lennart Bergelin / Torsten Johansson; Raymond Egan / Cyril Kemp	3; 6	6; 1	6; 3	2; 6	6; 3
4	(Sweden) (Republic of Ireland)	Torsten Johansson; Cyril Kemp	3; 6	6; 1	6; 3	2; 6	6; 3
5	(Sweden) (Republic of Ireland)	Lennart Bergelin; Raymond Egan	6; 4	6; 2	6; 0

=== Belgium vs. China ===
Belgium
3
Brussels, Belgium
24–26 May 1946

Taiwan
2

			1	2	3	4	5
1	(Belgium) (Taiwan)	Jacques Van den Eynde; Kho Sin-Kie	3; 6	5; 7	3; 6
2	(Belgium) (Taiwan)	Philippe Washer; Choy Wai-Chuen	7; 5	6; 4	6; 2
3	(Belgium) (Taiwan)	Pierre Geelhand de Merxem / Philippe Washer; Choy Wai-Chuen / Kho Sin-Kie	5; 7	6; 3	6; 0	3; 6	6; 2
4	(Belgium) (Taiwan)	Jacques Van den Eynde; Choy Wai-Chuen	4; 6	6; 1	6; 3	6; 4
5	(Belgium) (Taiwan)	Philippe Washer; Kho Sin-Kie	6; 1	7; 5	3; 6	4; 6	1; 6

=== Switzerland vs. France ===
Switzerland
2
Montreux, Switzerland
24–26 May 1946

France
3

			1	2	3	4	5
1	(Switzerland) (France)	Hans Huonder; Yvon Petra	8; 10	0; 6	1; 6
2	(Switzerland) (France)	Jost Spitzer; Pierre Pellizza	6; 2	6; 3	6; 2
3	(Switzerland) (France)	René Buser / Jost Spitzer; Marcel Bernard / Yvon Petra	0; 6	1; 6	2; 6
4	(Switzerland) (France)	Jost Spitzer; Yvon Petra	3; 6	3; 6	4; 6
5	(Switzerland) (France)	Hans Huonder; Pierre Pellizza	7; 5	6; 4	7; 5

=== Czechoslovakia vs. Yugoslavia ===
Czechoslovakia
2
Prague, Czechoslovakia
24–26 May 1946

Yugoslavia
3

			1	2	3	4	5
1	(Czechoslovakia) (Socialist Federal Republic of Yugoslavia)	Vojtěch Vodička; Franjo Punčec	3; 6	5; 7	5; 7
2	(Czechoslovakia) (Socialist Federal Republic of Yugoslavia)	Jaroslav Drobný; Dragutin Mitić	6; 3	4; 6	6; 0	1; 6	3; 6
3	(Czechoslovakia) (Socialist Federal Republic of Yugoslavia)	Josef Caska / Jaroslav Drobný; Dragutin Mitić / Josip Palada	10; 8	6; 2	6; 4
4	(Czechoslovakia) (Socialist Federal Republic of Yugoslavia)	Vojtěch Vodička; Dragutin Mitić	2; 6	0; 6	0; 6
5	(Czechoslovakia) (Socialist Federal Republic of Yugoslavia)	Jaroslav Drobný; Franjo Punčec	6; 3	6; 2	6; 4

== Semifinals ==
=== Sweden vs. Belgium ===
Sweden
4
Tennisstadion, Stockholm, Sweden
12–14 June 1946
Clay

Belgium
1

			1	2	3	4	5
1	(Sweden) (Belgium)	Lennart Bergelin; Jacques Peten	3; 6	6; 3	6; 1	6; 1
2	(Sweden) (Belgium)	Torsten Johansson; Philippe Washer	2; 6	1; 6	4; 6
3	(Sweden) (Belgium)	Lennart Bergelin / Torsten Johansson; Pierre Geelhand de Merxem / Philippe Washer	4; 6	6; 2	6; 4	6; 4
4	(Sweden) (Belgium)	Torsten Johansson; Jacques Peten	6; 3	6; 3	6; 0
5	(Sweden) (Belgium)	Lennart Bergelin; Philippe Washer	7; 5	3; 6	6; 3	9; 7

=== France vs. Yugoslavia ===
France
2
Stade Roland Garros, Paris, France
9–11 June 1946
Clay

Yugoslavia
3

			1	2	3	4	5
1	(France) (Socialist Federal Republic of Yugoslavia)	Yvon Petra; Dragutin Mitić	2; 6	8; 6	6; 4	3; 6	8; 6
2	(France) (Socialist Federal Republic of Yugoslavia)	Marcel Bernard; Franjo Punčec	2; 6	6; 1	0; 6	7; 5	6; 3
3	(France) (Socialist Federal Republic of Yugoslavia)	Bernard Destremau / Pierre Pellizza; Dragutin Mitić / Franjo Punčec	10; 8	6; 8	3; 6	7; 5	8; 10
4	(France) (Socialist Federal Republic of Yugoslavia)	Marcel Bernard; Dragutin Mitić	3; 6	6; 4	6; 3	0; 6	3; 6
5	(France) (Socialist Federal Republic of Yugoslavia)	Yvon Petra; Franjo Punčec	3; 6	6; 3	4; 6	9; 7	0; 6

== Final ==
=== Sweden vs. Yugoslavia ===
Sweden
3
Centercourt, Varberg, Sweden
14–17 July 1946
Clay

Yugoslavia
2

			1	2	3	4	5
1	(Sweden) (Socialist Federal Republic of Yugoslavia)	Torsten Johansson; Dragutin Mitić	6; 4	6; 1	1; 6	2; 6	0; 6
2	(Sweden) (Socialist Federal Republic of Yugoslavia)	Lennart Bergelin; Josip Palada	2; 6	2; 6	3; 6
3	(Sweden) (Socialist Federal Republic of Yugoslavia)	Lennart Bergelin / Torsten Johansson; Dragutin Mitić / Josip Palada	6; 1	3; 6	3; 6	8; 6	6; 2
4	(Sweden) (Socialist Federal Republic of Yugoslavia)	Torsten Johansson; Josip Palada	6; 3	6; 4	6; 4
5	(Sweden) (Socialist Federal Republic of Yugoslavia)	Lennart Bergelin; Dragutin Mitić	5; 7	3; 6	6; 3	6; 1	10; 8
