= 2002 Commonwealth Bank International – Draw =

Draw
- 2002 Commonwealth Bank International

Final
- Champion: (United States) Pete Sampras
- Runner-up: (United States) Andre Agassi
- Score: 7–6^{(8–6)}, 6–7^{(6–8)}, 6–3
← 2001 ·	Commonwealth Bank International	· 2003 →

Andre Agassi was the defending champion, but Pete Sampras defeated him 7–6^{(8–6)}, 6–7^{(6–8)}, 6–3, in the final.

== Players ==
1. (United States) Andre Agassi (final, second place)
2. (Russia) Yevgeny Kafelnikov (first round, sixth place)
3. (Germany) Tommy Haas (first round, eighth place)
4. (United States) Pete Sampras (champion, first place)
5. (Spain) Àlex Corretja (first round, seventh place)
6. (Sweden) Thomas Enqvist (semifinals, fourth place)
7. (United States) Taylor Dent (first round, fifth place)
8. (Australia) Scott Draper (semifinals, third place)

== Draw ==
=== Key ===
- Q = Qualifier
- WC = Wild card
- LL = Lucky loser
- Alt = Alternate
- SE = Special exempt
- PR = Protected ranking
- ITF = ITF entry
- JE = Junior exempt
- w/o = Walkover
- r = Retired
- d = Defaulted
- SR = Special ranking

=== Main draw ===
First round
1	(United States) Andre Agassi	6	6
7	(United States) Taylor Dent	3	2
3	(Germany) Tommy Haas	5	6	3
6	(Sweden) Thomas Enqvist	7	4	6
5	(Spain) Àlex Corretja	4	6^{0}
4	(United States) Pete Sampras	6	7^{7}
8	(Australia) Scott Draper	6	6
2	(Russia) Yevgeny Kafelnikov	3	4

Semifinals
1	(United States) Andre Agassi	6	6^{6}	6
6	(Sweden) Thomas Enqvist	2	7^{8}	3
4	(United States) Pete Sampras	6	7^{7}
8	(Australia) Scott Draper	2	6^{5}

Final (First/Second place match)
1	(United States) Andre Agassi	6^{6}	7^{8}	3
4	(United States) Pete Sampras	7^{8}	6^{6}	6
Third/Fourth place match
6	(Sweden) Thomas Enqvist	4	7	4
8	(Australia) Scott Draper	6	5	6

=== Play-offs ===
First round
7	(United States) Taylor Dent	7^{8}	7^{7}
3	(Germany) Tommy Haas	6^{6}	6^{4}
5	(Spain) Àlex Corretja	4	2
2	(Russia) Yevgeny Kafelnikov	6	6

Fifth/Sixth place match
7	(United States) Taylor Dent	6	7^{7}
2	(Russia) Yevgeny Kafelnikov	4	6^{4}
Seventh/Eighth place match
3	(Germany) Tommy Haas	7^{7}	4	4
5	(Spain) Àlex Corretja	6^{2}	6	6
