= 2004 Commonwealth Bank International – Draw =

Draw
- 2004 Commonwealth Bank International

Final
- Champion: (Argentina) David Nalbandian
- Runner-up: (United States) Andre Agassi
- Score: 6–2, 6–3
← 2003 ·	Commonwealth Bank International	· 2005 →

Andre Agassi was the defending champion, but David Nalbandian defeated him 6–2, 6–3, in the final.

== Players ==
1. (United States) Andy Roddick (semifinals, withdrew due to foot blisters, fourth place)
2. (Switzerland) Roger Federer (semifinals, third place)
3. (United States) Andre Agassi (final, second place)
4. (Argentina) David Nalbandian (champion, first place)
5. (France) Sébastien Grosjean (first round, sixth place)
6. (United States) Taylor Dent (first round, seventh place)
7. (United States) Robby Ginepri (first round, fifth place)
8. (Sweden) Thomas Johansson (first round, eighth place)

== Draw ==
=== Key ===
- Q = Qualifier
- WC = Wild card
- LL = Lucky loser
- Alt = Alternate
- SE = Special exempt
- PR = Protected ranking
- ITF = ITF entry
- JE = Junior exempt
- w/o = Walkover
- r = Retired
- d = Defaulted
- SR = Special ranking

=== Main draw ===
First round
1	(United States) Andy Roddick	6	6
7	(United States) Robby Ginepri	1	3
4	(Argentina) David Nalbandian	4	7^{10}	7^{7}
6	(United States) Taylor Dent	6	6^{8}	6^{5}
5	(France) Sébastien Grosjean	3	3
3	(United States) Andre Agassi	6	6
8	(Sweden) Thomas Johansson	4	7^{7}	3
2	(Switzerland) Roger Federer	6	6^{2}	6

Semifinals
1	(United States) Andy Roddick	6	6^{2}	6^{4}
4	(Argentina) David Nalbandian	3	7^{7}	7^{7}
3	(United States) Andre Agassi	6	6
2	(Switzerland) Roger Federer	2	4

Final (First/Second place match)
4	(Argentina) David Nalbandian	6	6
3	(United States) Andre Agassi	2	3
Third/Fourth place match
1	(United States) Andy Roddick
2	(Switzerland) Roger Federer	w/o

=== Play-offs ===
First round
7	(United States) Robby Ginepri	7	6
6	(United States) Taylor Dent	5	1
5	(France) Sébastien Grosjean	6	6
8	(Sweden) Thomas Johansson	4	2

Fifth/Sixth place match
7	(United States) Robby Ginepri	7^{7}	6
5	(France) Sébastien Grosjean	6^{3}	2
Seventh/Eighth place match
6	(United States) Taylor Dent	6^{1}	6	6
8	(Sweden) Thomas Johansson	7^{7}	2	4
