= 2014 AAMI Classic =

- 2014 AAMI Classic

Final
- Champion: (Japan) Kei Nishikori
- Runner-up: (Czech Republic) Tomáš Berdych
- Score: 6-4, 7-5
← 2013 ·	AAMI Classic	· 2015 →

The 2014 AAMI Classic took place between 8–11 January 2014, at the Kooyong Stadium in Melbourne, Australia.

Lleyton Hewitt was going to play, but was replaced by Jordan Thompson after winning the 2014 Brisbane International. In the final it was Kei Nishikori who defeated Tomáš Berdych in the final 7-5 6–4 to become the first Japanese winner of the event.

== Seeds ==
1. (Czech Republic) Tomáš Berdych (final, second place)
2. (Switzerland) Stanislas Wawrinka (first round, retired)
3. (France) Richard Gasquet (final, retired)
4. (Japan) Kei Nishikori (replaced Richard Gasquet, semifinal, first place)
5. (France) Gilles Simon (semifinal, retired)
6. (Bulgaria) Grigor Dimitrov (Play-offs first round, retired)
7. (Spain) Fernando Verdasco (first round, fifth place)
8. (Australia) Jordan Thompson (first round, seventh place)
9. (Russia) Mikhail Youzhny (replaced Stanislas Wawrinka, playoffs first round)
10. (Australia) Nick Kyrgios (replaced Mikhail Youzhny, sixth place)
11. (Argentina) Juan Mónaco (replaced Grigor Dimitrov, eighth place)
12. (Australia) Benjamin Mitchell (replaced Richard Gasquet, fourth place)
13. (Australia) Luke Saville (replaced Gilles Simon, third place)

== Draw ==
=== Key ===
- Q = Qualifier
- WC = Wild card
- LL = Lucky loser
- Alt = Alternate
- ITF = ITF entry
- PR = Protected ranking
- SR = Special ranking
- SE = Special exempt
- JE = Junior exempt
- JR = Junior Accelerator Programme entrant
- CO = College Accelerator Programme entrant
- NG = Next Gen Accelerator Program entrant
- w/o = Walkover
- r = Retired
- d = Defaulted

=== Main draw ===
First round
1	(Czech Republic) Tomáš Berdych	7	6
7	(Spain) Fernando Verdasco	5	2
6	(Bulgaria) Grigor Dimitrov	6^{5}	4
4	(Japan) Kei Nishikori	7^{7}	6
3	(France) Richard Gasquet	7	3	7^{7}
8	(Australia) Jordan Thompson	5	6	6^{4}
5	(France) Gilles Simon	4	7	6
2	(Switzerland) Stanislas Wawrinka	6	5	3

Semifinals
1	(Czech Republic) Tomáš Berdych	6	6
4	(Japan) Kei Nishikori	4	1
3	(France) Richard Gasquet	7^{7}	1
5	(France) Gilles Simon	6^{4}	0^{r}

Final
1	(Czech Republic) Tomáš Berdych	4	5
4	(Japan) Kei Nishikori	6	7
Third place match
12	(Australia) Benjamin Mitchell	3	4
13	(Australia) Luke Saville	6	6

=== Play-offs ===
First round
7	(Spain) Fernando Verdasco	6	6
6	(Bulgaria) Grigor Dimitrov	4	2
8	(Australia) Jordan Thompson	1	5
9	(Russia) Mikhail Youzhny	6	7

Fifth place match
7	(Spain) Fernando Verdasco	6	6	7
10	(Australia) Nick Kyrgios	7	3	6
Seventh place match
11	(Argentina) Juan Mónaco	4	2
8	(Australia) Jordan Thompson	6	6
