= Ljubomir Czajkowsky =

Austrian tennis player (1918–1974)

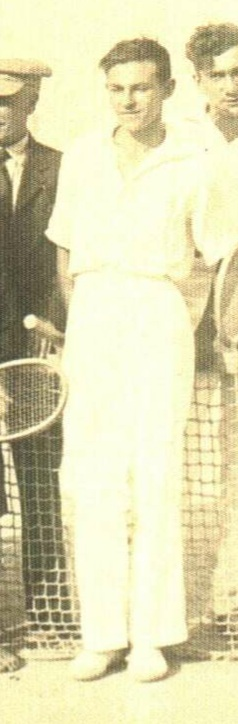
- Lubomyr Chaykivsky in 1934
- Full name: Lubomyr Yosypovych Chaykivsky
- Country (sports): POL; AUT
- Residence: Kolomyia, Poland (now - Ukraine); Warsaw, Poland; Lviv, Soviet Union; Innsbruck, Austria
- Born: 23.05.1918 Warsaw, Russian Empire
- Died: 1974 (age 56) Munich, Germany
- Retired: 1957

Singles
- Career titles: 2

Team competitions
- Davis Cup: 0–2

Lubomyr Yosypovych Chaykivsky (Polish: Lubomir Czajkowski; German: Ljubomir Czajkowsky; 23 May 1918 – 1974) was a Ukrainian, Polish and Austrian tennis player in the 1930s, 1940s and 1950s. He is a first Ukrainian who competed at the Davis Cup, representing Austrian team in 1949. He was a finalist of the Polish Junior Tennis Championships in singles and doubles (1936), the Ukrainian SSR Tennis Championships winner and the USSR Tennis Championships finalist in doubles (1940), two-time winner of the Austrian Open Kitzbühel tournament in 1948 and 1950.

== Early life ==
Lubomyr Chaykivsky was born on 23 May 1918 in Warsaw in the family of Joseph Chaykivsky, a teacher and long-time principal of the local women's pedagogical seminary.

At the age of 10, Lubomyr became a student at the Ukrainian State Gymnasium.

== Career in Kolomyia ==
Lubomyr's first tennis coach was Oleksandr Kulchytsky.

In 1932, at the age of 14, he first took part in tennis competitions in Kolomyia, in which 7 of the best tennis players from Lviv performed. In the final, he met with M. Drohomyretsky from Lviv, and during the 5th set with a score of 9:9, the game was ended due to high air temperature and both were declared winners. In the same year, he won tennis competitions in Chernivtsi and Stanislaviv, and in 1933 he won the junior championship in Lviv in singles.

In 1934, he triumphed at the Galician Tennis Championship, held in Stanislaviv: then Lubomyr Chaykivsky took first place in singles, doubles (together with Roman Selskyi) and mixed (together with Sonya Mogilnytska).

In 1935 he joined the Polish club "Pogoń Lwów", and in August he took part in the Open (International) Championship of Poland in Warsaw, where he lost in the semifinals to. I. Tłoczyński in the singles category, while becoming a finalist in the doubles competition (together with V. Kurman). In autumn, he became the champion of the Open Championship of Lviv in the junior singles category.

== Career in Poland ==
In 1936 he went to Warsaw to study at the university, where he joined the club "Legia Warszawa". A few months later he was invited to the Polish junior national team.

In June 1936, he took part in the Polish Junior Tennis Championships, held in Lviv. In the second round, he defeated tennis player from Lviv Volodymyr Olejnyshyn with a score of 6:2, 4:6, 6:3, in the quarterfinals - Cislikovsky (6:1, 6:1), in the semifinals - Jerzy Gottschalk (6:3, 6:2), in the final he lost to Leon Kolczak from Katowice, becoming a finalist of the championship. He also reached the final in doubles (together with Ksavera Tłochyński), losing to the pair Gottschalk/Strelecki with a score of 6:3, 6:3.

In June 1937, he took part in the Polish Tennis Championship in Kraków, reaching the quarterfinals after losing to Warsaw's Czesław Szychala (6:4, 6:2, 6:2), the second round in doubles and the quarterfinals in mixed doubles. In August, at the Polish International Championship in Bydgoszcz, which featured teams from Poland, Austria, Germany and Romania, he defeated Hans Acker in the second round, but reached the quarterfinals, losing to Austrian tennis player Adam Baworowski (6:3, 6:4, 8:6). He also took part in the doubles with Jerzy Gottschalk, where he lost in the semi-finals to the pair of Haendewerk/Lund from Germany with a score of 6:4, 4:6, 4:6, 6:1, 6:4.

At the next Polish Tennis Championship, held on June 13-19, 1938 in Katowice, in the doubles (together with Jerzy Gottschalk) he defeated the Lviv pair Szymanski/Oleynyshyn with a score of 6:1, 6:0, 6:1, but stopped at the semi-final stage, losing to the Krakow-Katowice pair Bratek/Gorjayn with a score of 3:6, 0:6, 6:3, 7:5, 6:1. In the mixed doubles (together with Maria Fryszynówna), the results were worse: in the quarter-finals he lost to the mixed pair Siodowna/Spikhala with a score of 6:4, 6:2. In singles, he again stopped at the 1/4 final stage, losing to his teammate Ignacy Tłoczyński with a score of 6:1, 6:1, 6:4. He also lost to him in the 1/4 final stage at the Polish International Championship in Gdynia in 1939 (6:0, 6:4, 6:2). At those competitions, in doubles (together with Bohdan Tomaszewski) he lost to a Yugoslav pair in the 1/4 final stage (6:3, 3:6, 6:4, 6:2), and in mixed doubles (together with Kindermanovna) to the Polish pair TłoczyńskiJJędrzejowska in the 1/2 final stage.

In late spring 1939, he failed in the quarterfinals of the Polish Tennis Championship held in Poznań, losing to Kazimierz Tarlowski with a score of 2:6, 6:1, 6:2, 6:1. Together with Bohdan Tomaszewski, he reached the semifinals in the doubles, and in the mixed doubles (together with Zofia Jędrzejowska) he also reached the semifinals.

At the tournament in Riga, Lubomyr Chaykivsky encountered Second World War.

== Career in the Soviet Union ==
After the beginning of the Soviet occupation of Galicia, he returned to Kolomyia, where he worked in the accounting department of the local railway transport directorate until 1940. Later, he left for Lviv, where he joined the regional voluntary sports society "Dynamo". Lyubomyr Chaykivskyi got into the Ukrainian SSR national tennis team, where he played in competitions against teams from Moscow. Then, Lyubomyr, together with his compatriot Józef Hebda, left no special chances for the tandem of leading Soviet tennis players D. Synyuchkov / Z. Zikmund in the doubles game, thus contributing to the overall victory of the Ukrainians in the match (7:4). Then he became the Ukrainian SSR champion in tennis in doubles, and at the USSR championship he won silver medals in doubles with Hebda. Also, at the USSR Tennis Championships, together with Gorina from Kyiv, he reached the 1/2 finals in mixed doubles.

Together with the Polish champion, a Polish from Lviv, Józef Hebda, Chaykivsky began to travel to the cities of the USSR, popularizing tennis in 1939-1941.

Lubomyr Chaykivsky held his last competition as a Soviet athlete in the second half of June 1941. In the city on the Neva, he participated in a match against Leningrad tennis players as part of the national team of the republican society "Dynamo". In the final match, slamming the door in farewell, the Ukrainian took his experienced opponent P. Maidansky off the court 6:3, 6:2.

After that, Chaykivsky escaped, reached his native town Kolomyia, and from there moved to Austria and accepted Austrian citizenship.

== Career in Austria ==
After moving to Austria, he settled in Innsbruck. In 1948, he won the Austrian Open Kitzbühel, and the following year, he was a finalist in the tournament, losing to German Willy Stingl (6:1, 6:2, 6:3).

On May 6–8, 1949, he took part in the 1949 Davis Cup, where in the second round he lost to Dragutin Mitić with a score of 2:6, 2:6, 2:6 and to Milan Branović with a score of 4:6, 3:6, 4:6 in singles. The Austrian team eventually lost to the Yugoslavia with a score of 1:4. In the same year, he took part in the BMW Open tournament, losing in the quarterfinals to Gottfried von Krym.

In 1950 he won the Austrian Open Kitzbühel again. In the same year he took part in the Innsbruck and Salzburg tournaments, where he lost in both the doubles and mixed doubles, as well as in the singles. At the end of the tournament he became the seventh seed in Austria.

In August 1951, he won the international tennis tournament of the Linz Figure Skating and Tennis Club in singles. He also took part in the tournament between the national teams of Austria and Yugoslavia, where he lost to the Yugoslavs in both singles and doubles with a score of 0:2.

He played in various tennis competitions until 1957.

== Later life and death ==
Chaykivsky's playing career ended with an injury when he fell on his racket and broke a rib. However, he did not leave tennis after that, but gave lessons as an instructor. Lubomyr Chaykivsky died in Munich from pneumonia in 1974.
