= Jacques Peten =

Belgian sportsman

- Peten at the French Championships
- Country (sports): Belgium
- Born: 8 December 1912 Antwerp, Belgium
- Died: 3 January 1995 (aged 82) Ixelles, Belgium
- Turned pro: 1936 (amateur tour)
- Retired: 1960

Singles
- Career record: 116–113
- Career titles: 7

Grand Slam singles results
- French Open: 4R (1947)
- Wimbledon: 3R (1946, 1947, 1949)
- US Open: 2R (1947)

Doubles

Grand Slam doubles results
- Wimbledon: 3R (1958)

Team competitions
- Davis Cup: SF (1946^{Eu})

Jacques Peten (8 December 1912 – 3 January 1995) was a Belgian alpine skier and tennis player. He competed in the men's combined event at the 1936 Winter Olympics. Peten represented Belgium in the Davis Cup, appearing in seven ties between 1946 and 1951, as well as competing in the French Championships, Wimbledon and the U.S. Championships.

== Biography ==
=== Early life ===
Jacques Auguste Peten was born in Antwerp, Belgium, on 8 December 1912, to Raymond Francois Eligius Marie Peten, a banker, and Hortense Fabri. He was named after his paternal grandfather. Peten married Catherine Margaret Staub.

=== Skiing ===
He participated to the Winter Olympics in 1936 in the alpine ski event at Garmisch-Partenkirchen in Germany.

=== Tennis ===
Peten was ranked for many years number 2 in Belgium behind Philippe Washer. In 1950 he managed to become champion of Belgium, defeating Jacques Brichant in semifinals and Leo Rooman in the final, in the year when Washer was absent, having had to renounce defending his title due to an indisposition. However, Peten had already defeated Washer two times, the first at the Energie in 1947, and the second in 1948.

Peten was Belgian champion in men's doubles in 1946 with Jack Van den Eynde.

He was among the best 32 at Wimbledon for three times, reaching the third round in 1946, 1947, and 1949. He played in Wimbledon's men's single from 1946 to 1954.

He reached the fourth round at Roland Garros in 1947, when, after defeating Bernard Destremau 6–2, 6–2, 6–1, and South Africa's Eustace Fannin 6–2, 6–4, 6–3, he was stopped by defending champion Marcel Bernard 6–3, 6–2, 6–3. He played at the French Open from 1947 to 1953.

He played at the US Open once in 1947, reaching the 1/32 finals.

Peten never played in the Australian Open.

He played 7 Davis Cup matches from 1946 to 1951, with 4 wins and 8 losses in singles and one loss in doubles. In the 1946 Davis Cup he reached the semifinals of the Europe Zone with his national team, where they were defeated by eventual Europe Zone winner and Inter-Zone finalist Sweden. In the 1947 Davis Cup they reached the quarterfinals, and again in 1948, when they lost to eventual Europe Zone winner and Inter-Zone finalist Czechoslovakia.

Peten was ranked 6th best player in France, where he lived during the war.

Towards the end of his career, an aged Peten defeated debuting Nicola Pietrangeli at the 1952 Italian Open. Pietrangeli later wrote:

I was drawn with a Belgian, Jacques Peten. He was forty years old, and I was sure of winning. I lost in four sets, a beating that I never forgot.

== Career finals ==
=== Singles:9 (7 titles, 2 runners-up) ===
| Result | Year | Tournament | Surface | Opponent | Score | Ref. |
|---|---|---|---|---|---|---|
| Win | 1942 | Megève International | Clay | (France) Jean Lesueur | 6–3, 4–6, 8–6, 3–6, 6–1 | |
| Loss | 1944 | Cannes Championships | Clay | (France) Pierre Pellizza | 6–8, 4–6 | |
| Win | 1947 | Real Club Nautico Tournament | Clay | (Italy) Vanni Canepele | 3–6, 8–6, 8–6 | |
| Loss | 1948 | International Championships of Egypt | Clay | (Socialist Federal Republic of Yugoslavia) Franjo Punčec | 2–6, 3–6, 4–6 | |
| Win | 1948 | Knokke Le-Zoute, Belgium | Clay | (Argentina) Enrique Morea | 6–2, 6–4 | |
| Win | 1948 | Portuguese International Championships | Clay | (Netherlands) Boebi van Meegeren | 4–6, 6–4, 6–1, 7–5 | |
| Win | 1950 | Belgian National Championships | Clay | (Belgium) Leo Rooman | 7–5, 6–0, 6–2 | |
| Win | 1951 | Lugano International | Clay | (Czechoslovakia) Milan Matouš | 3–6, 6–2, 9–7 | |
| Win | 1957 | Kulm Carlton Tournament | Clay | (Uruguay) Eduardo Argon | 6–4, 5–7, 6–2 | |
