= 2000 Colonial Classic – Draw =

Draw
- 2000 Colonial Classic

Final
- Champion: (United States) Andre Agassi
- Runner-up: (Australia) Mark Philippoussis
- Score: walkover
← 1999 ·	Colonial Classic	· 2001 →

Thomas Enqvist was the defending champion, but lost in the semifinals to Andre Agassi.

Andre Agassi won the final after receiving a walkover from Mark Philippoussis due to neck strain.

== Players ==
1. (United States) Andre Agassi (champion, first place)
2. (Russia) Yevgeny Kafelnikov (first round, eighth place)
3. (United States) Pete Sampras (semifinals, third place)
4. (Sweden) Thomas Enqvist (semifinals, withdrew due to a shoulder injury, fourth place)
5. (Germany) Nicolas Kiefer (first round, sixth place)
6. (Netherlands) Richard Krajicek (first round, fifth place)
7. (Australia) Mark Philippoussis (final, withdrew due to neck strain, second place)
8. (South Africa) Wayne Ferreira (first round, seventh place)

== Draw ==
=== Key ===
- Q = Qualifier
- WC = Wild card
- LL = Lucky loser
- Alt = Alternate
- SE = Special exempt
- PR = Protected ranking
- ITF = ITF entry
- JE = Junior exempt
- w/o = Walkover
- r = Retired
- d = Defaulted
- SR = Special ranking

=== Main draw ===
First round
1	(United States) Andre Agassi	6	6
8	(South Africa) Wayne Ferreira	2	4
4	(Sweden) Thomas Enqvist	6	6
5	(Germany) Nicolas Kiefer	3	4
6	(Netherlands) Richard Krajicek	4	6	6^{5}
3	(United States) Pete Sampras	6	3	7^{7}
7	(Australia) Mark Philippoussis	7^{7}	6^{8}	6
2	(Russia) Yevgeny Kafelnikov	6^{3}	7^{10}	1

Semifinals
1	(United States) Andre Agassi	6	5	6
4	(Sweden) Thomas Enqvist	2	7	4
3	(United States) Pete Sampras	6^{4}	6^{5}
7	(Australia) Mark Philippoussis	7^{7}	7^{7}

Final (First/Second place match)
1	(United States) Andre Agassi	w/o
7	(Australia) Mark Philippoussis
Third/Fourth place match
4	(Sweden) Thomas Enqvist
3	(United States) Pete Sampras	w/o

=== Play-offs ===
First round
8	(South Africa) Wayne Ferreira	1	4
5	(Germany) Nicolas Kiefer	6	6
6	(Netherlands) Richard Krajicek	6	6
2	(Russia) Yevgeny Kafelnikov	3	4

Fifth/Sixth place match
5	(Germany) Nicolas Kiefer	4	6^{4}
6	(Netherlands) Richard Krajicek	6	7^{7}
Seventh/Eighth place match
8	(South Africa) Wayne Ferreira	7^{8}	6
2	(Russia) Yevgeny Kafelnikov	6^{6}	3
