= 2007 AAMI Classic – Draw =

Draw
- 2007 AAMI Classic

Final
- Champion: (United States) Andy Roddick
- Runner-up: (Switzerland) Roger Federer
- Score: 6–2, 3–6, 6–3
| ← 2006 · | AAMI Classic | · 2008 → |

Andy Roddick was the defending champion, and won in the final 6–2, 3–6, 6–3, against Roger Federer.

== Players ==
1. (Switzerland) Roger Federer (final, second place)
2. (United States) Andy Roddick (champion, first place)
3. (Croatia) Ivan Ljubičić (first round, sixth place)
4. (Argentina) David Nalbandian (first round, withdrew due to a knee injury)
5. (Germany) Tommy Haas (first round, eighth place)
6. (United Kingdom) Andy Murray (semifinals, third place)
7. (Czech Republic) Radek Štěpánek (first round, fifth place)
8. (Russia) Marat Safin (semifinals, fourth place)
9. (Chile) Fernando González (replaced David Nalbandian, seventh place)

== Draw ==
=== Key ===
- Q = Qualifier
- WC = Wild card
- LL = Lucky loser
- Alt = Alternate
- SE = Special exempt
- PR = Protected ranking
- ITF = ITF entry
- JE = Junior exempt
- w/o = Walkover
- r = Retired
- d = Defaulted
- SR = Special ranking

=== Main draw ===
First round
1 | (Switzerland) Roger Federer | 7^{7} | 6^{4} | 7^{7}
7 | (Czech Republic) Radek Štěpánek | 6^{2} | 7^{7} | 6^{5}
4 | (Argentina) David Nalbandian | 7 | 1 | 2
8 | (Russia) Marat Safin | 5 | 6 | 6
6 | (United Kingdom) Andy Murray | 6 | 6
3 | (Croatia) Ivan Ljubičić | 4 | 2
5 | (Germany) Tommy Haas | 2 | 3
2 | (United States) Andy Roddick | 6 | 6

Semifinals
1 | (Switzerland) Roger Federer | 6 | 7^{7}
8 | (Russia) Marat Safin | 3 | 6^{2}
6 | (United Kingdom) Andy Murray | 4 | 4
2 | (United States) Andy Roddick | 6 | 6

Final (First/Second place match)
1 | (Switzerland) Roger Federer | 2 | 6 | 3
2 | (United States) Andy Roddick | 6 | 3 | 6
Third/Fourth place match
8 | (Russia) Marat Safin | 6^{2} | 2
6 | (United Kingdom) Andy Murray | 7^{7} | 6

=== Play-offs ===
First round
7 | (Czech Republic) Radek Štěpánek | 6 | 7^{7}
9 | (Chile) Fernando González | 4 | 6^{4}
3 | (Croatia) Ivan Ljubičić | 7^{7} | 6
5 | (Germany) Tommy Haas | 6^{5} | 4

Fifth/Sixth place match
7 | (Czech Republic) Radek Štěpánek | 6 | 6
3 | (Croatia) Ivan Ljubičić | 2 | 2
Seventh/Eighth place match
9 | (Chile) Fernando González | 6 | 7^{10}
5 | (Germany) Tommy Haas | 4 | 6^{8}
