= Kooyong Classic =

Exhibition
- Founded: 1988
- Editions: 35 (2026)
- Location: Melbourne; Australia
- Venue: Kooyong Stadium
- Surface: Plexicushion
- Draw: 8S
- Website: kooyongclassic.com.au

Current champions (2026)
- Men's singles: Karen Khachanov
- Women's singles: (Philippines) Alexandra Eala

The Kooyong Classic is a professional tennis exhibition singles-only tournament, played on outdoor hard courts. It is held annually in January, right before the Australian Open, at the Kooyong Stadium in Kooyong, Melbourne, Australia. Eight invited players participate in the tournament in a promotion/relegation format, playing three matches each over four days to determine the standings from the first place (won all three matches) to the eighth (lost all three matches). Aside from the competition, exhibition matches also take place during the tournament.

== Competition format ==
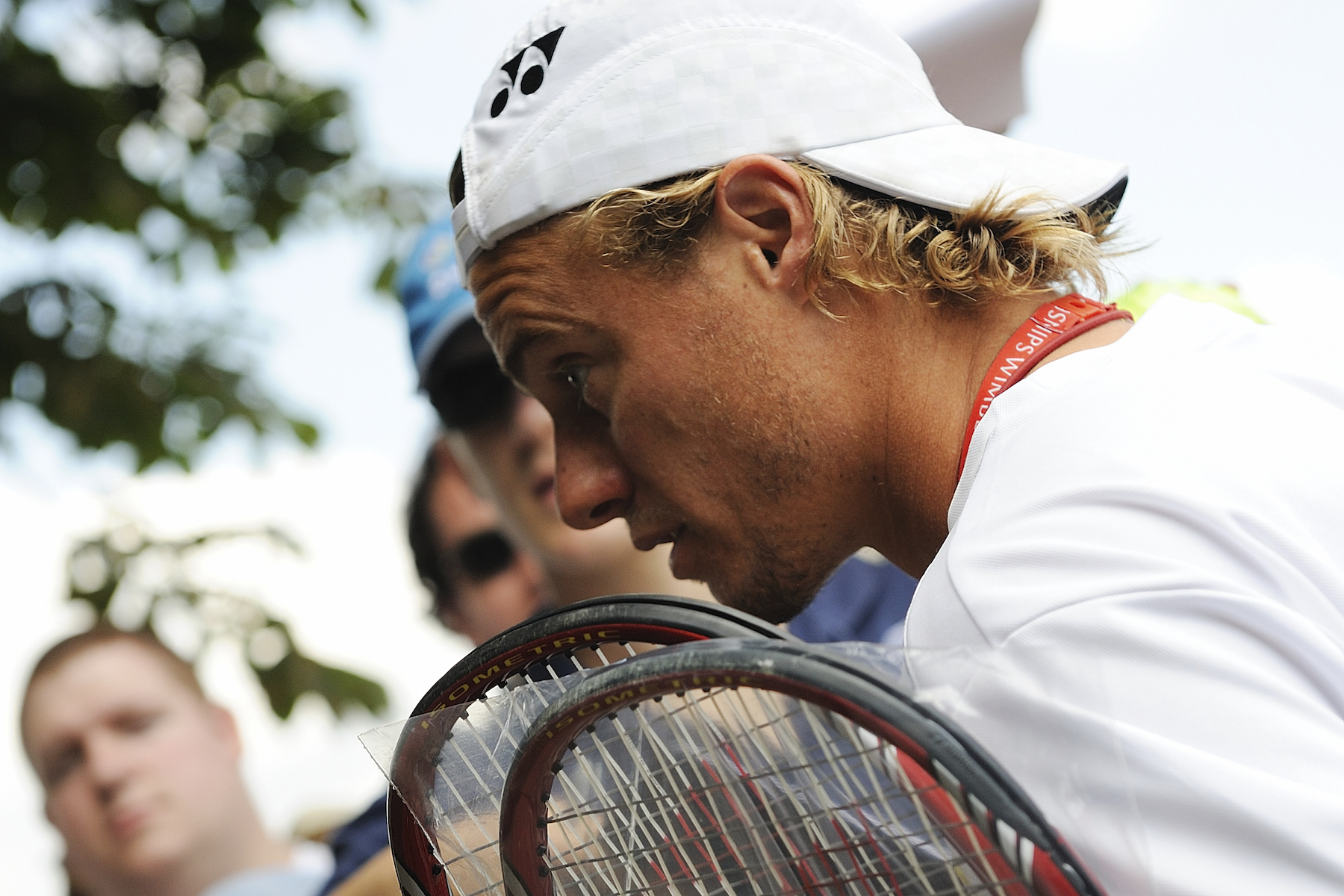
Former World No. 1 Lleyton Hewitt is the only one out of seven Australian winners to have titled more than once in Kooyong (2011, 2013).

The Kooyong Classic draw includes eight invited Association of Tennis Professionals (ATP) players, seeded according to the ATP rankings of the week preceding the tournament. Four first round matches are played, after which the four winners advance to the semifinals, while the four losers are relegated to a play-off draw. The two semifinals of the main draw and of the play-off draw are then played, setting four new matches : the main draw final, to decide of the champion and of the runner-up, the main draw consolation match, to decide of the third and fourth places, the play-off draw final, to decide of the fifth and sixth places, and the play-off draw consolation match, to decide of the seventh and eighth places.

The tournament takes place over four days, with the four first round matches taking place on the first day, the two first round matches of the play-off draw, and one semifinal of the main draw taking place on the second day, the final and the consolation match of the play-off draw, and the second semifinal of the main draw taking place on the third day, and the final and the consolation match of the main draw taking place on the fourth and last day.

Unlike in official tournaments, players retiring during or withdrawing before a match are not automatically eliminated from the tournament, and can still participate to the play-offs or the consolation match –as in the 2008 event, when Nikolay Davydenko withdrew due to fatigue before his play-off draw first round match against Brydan Klein, but went on to play and win the play-off draw consolation match against Ivan Ljubičić. Players who decide to withdraw from the competition due to injury are replaced by an alternate for the play-offs or the consolation match –as in the 2006 edition, when David Nalbandian's withdrawal allowed alternate Max Mirnyi to enter the draw. All matches are played in a best-of-three sets with tie-break format.

The Kooyong Classic taking place the week before the first Grand Slam of the regular season, the Australian Open, exhibition matches are frequently organised by the event, outside of the competition, to allow top players lacking practice to play matches before the Open.

== History ==
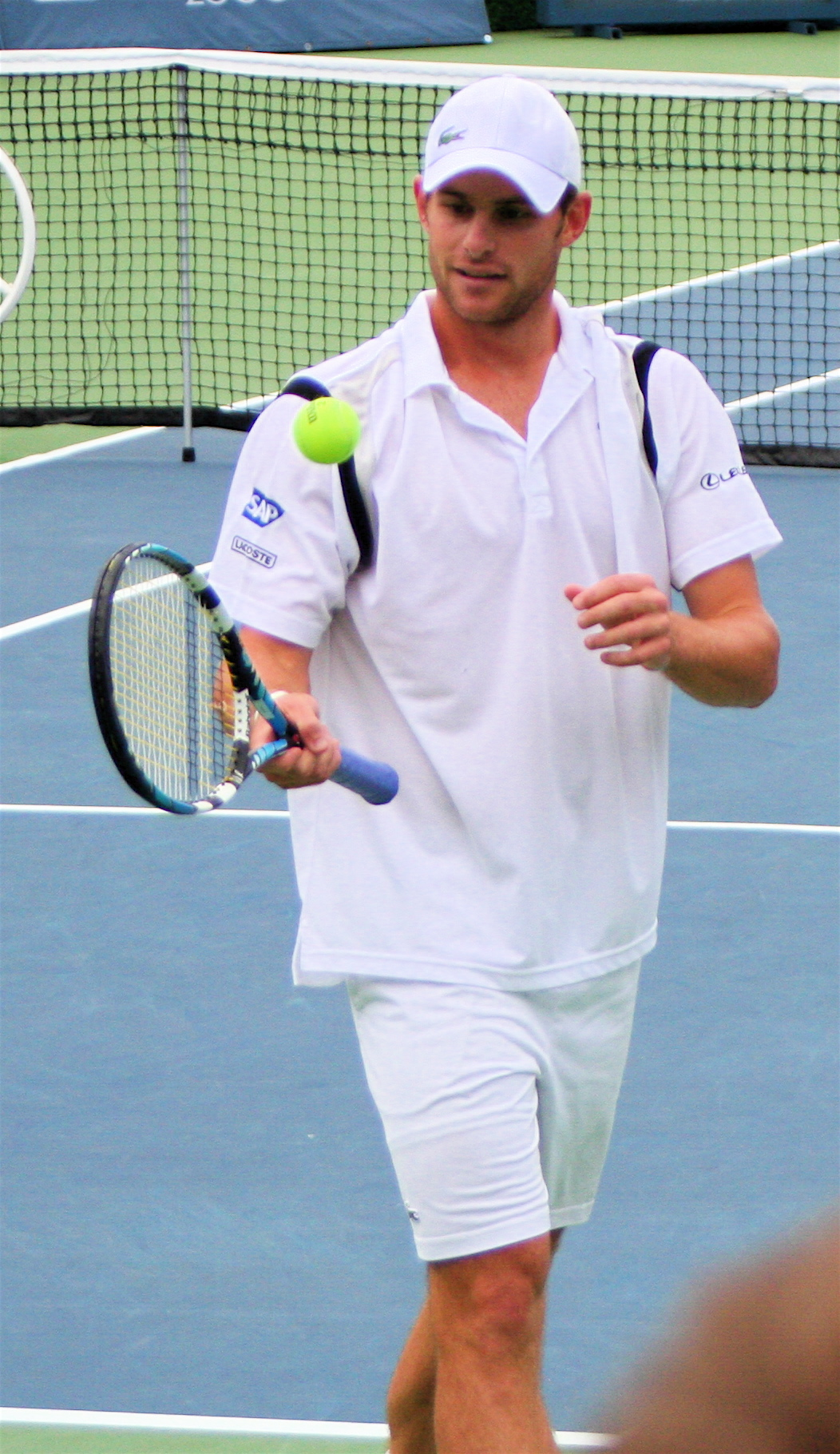
Former World No. 1 Andy Roddick co-holds the record for most titles with Michael Chang and Andre Agassi, winning three times in 2006, 2007 and 2008

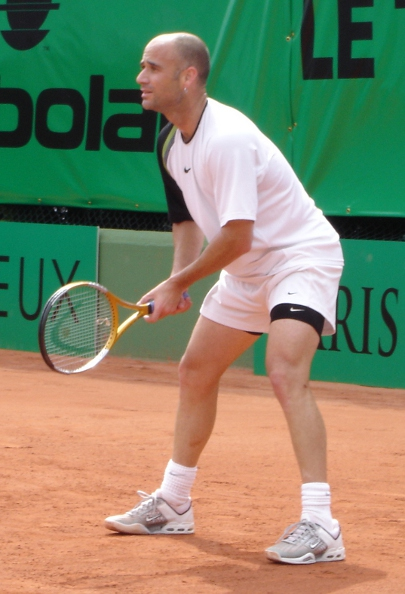
Former World No. 1 Andre Agassi appeared in six finals between 1998 and 2004, winning three and losing three

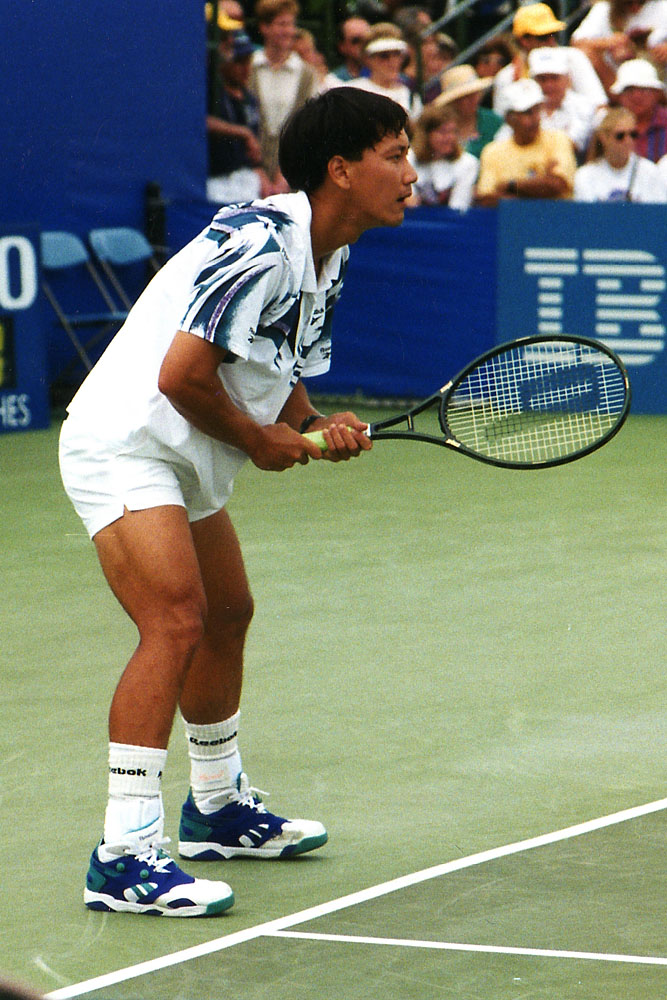
1989 French Open champion Michael Chang won three back-to-back titles from 1995 to 1997, beating Yevgeny Kafelnikov once, Pete Sampras twice

The first Kooyong exhibition tournament took place in 1988, the year the Australian Open moved from the courts of the Kooyong Lawn Tennis Club, which had become too small to host the event, to the newly built National Tennis Centre at Flinders Park (which would become known as Melbourne Park in 1996). Initiated by Colin Stubs, still the director of the tournament in 2009, the first Kooyong Invitational was created to continue the tradition of having a world-class tennis tournament at the Kooyong Lawn Tennis Club. Set in December 1988, to allow participants to prepare for the 1989 Australian Open, and played on the club's traditional grass courts, the sixteen-men event comprised fifteen Australian players and Goran Ivanišević from Croatia, and eventually saw the victory of 1988 Australian Open runner-up Pat Cash over countryman Wally Masur in the final.

As it started a sponsoring partnership with Colonial Mutual in 1990, the tournament (known as Colonial Mutual Classic from 1990 to 1992, then Colonial Classic from 1993 to 2001) changed its competition format to an eight-men round-robin tournament, with each player of the two four-men groups playing two round robin games, and a third match for the standings. The tournament's success increased during the Colonial-sponsored years, and started to attract more and more international players, outside of the Australian constituency, as it became the most important warm-up event to the first Grand Slam of the season –the only one to be held in the same city as the Open, in Melbourne. The first non-Australian champion was crowned in 1991, when Australian Open quarterfinalist Goran Prpić from Croatia defeated Richard Fromberg for the title, and the first all-foreign final came in 1993, with eventual World No. 1 Thomas Muster from Austria edging Russian Alexander Volkov. The 1993 Kooyong tournament also included for the first time an eight-players women's event, running concurrently with the men's. The first women's Colonial Mutual Classic featured an all-Australian final, where 1992 Barcelona Olympics doubles bronze medalist Rachel McQuillan defeated fellow bronze medalist Nicole Provis in three sets.

The next year, the Colonial Classic was held in mid-January one, just before the 1995 Australian Open, and switched from grass to hard courts, to make the playing conditions closer to that of the Rebound Ace-surfaced Grand Slam tournament. The new-style Colonial Classic (back to being a men's only tournament) saw American champions like Pete Sampras, Andre Agassi and Michael Chang starting to compete, with the latter starting a series of three victories at the event from 1995 to 1997. Eventual 2003 Wimbledon Championships runner-up Mark Philippoussis from Australia won the last edition played in a round-robin format in 1998, as the 1999 event was the first played under the current promotion/relegation system, with Swede Thomas Enqvist coming off as the winner. Agassi became the most successful player at the event after his 1998 runner-up finish, reaching five more finals consecutively from 2000 to 2004 (beating Philippoussis in 2000, Yevgeny Kafelnikov in 2001 and Sébastien Grosjean in 2003). Commonwealth Bank took over the sponsorship of the tournament from 2002 to 2004, transforming the Colonial Classic into the Commonwealth Bank International, before the event went sponsorless in 2005, only known as the Kooyong Classic, as World No. 1 Roger Federer from Switzerland collected his first title in Kooyong.

AAMI picked up the event's sponsorship in 2006 for a three-years contract, renewed in 2009 -starting the tournament's run as the AAMI Classic. 2003 US Open champion Andy Roddick tied countrymen Chang and Agassi with three titles (2006, 2007, 2008), Roger Federer won his second title (2009), Fernando Verdasco became the first Spanish champion at the event (2010), before 19-year-old Bernard Tomic (2012) and former World No. 1 Lleyton Hewitt (2011, 2013) claimed three consecutive titles for Australia.

The arrival of new tune-up events for the Australian Open, like the Mubadala World Tennis Championship in Abu Dhabi or the national year-end championships like the Masters France raised questions concerning Kooyong event's future. Different ways to improve the tournament studied by promoter Colin Stubs include lengthening it beyond four days (despite Roddick's withdrawal in 2009, due to the three-match format already being "too taxing" according to the American), reviving the short-lived women's event, or allowing retired players to compete.

As a result of the COVID-19 pandemic, the tournament was not held in from 2021 through 2022, before returning from 2023.

== Past finals ==
In men's singles, Michael Chang (1995–97), Andre Agassi (2000–01, 2003) and Andy Roddick (2006–08) co-hold the record for most titles with three victories each. Chang (1995–97) and Roddick (2006–08) share the record for most consecutive titles with three.

=== Men's singles ===
Year	Champions	Runners-up	Score
2026	Karen Khachanov	(United States) Frances Tiafoe	6–4, 6–4
2025	Not Held		
2024	(Italy) Jannik Sinner	(Norway) Casper Ruud	6–2, 6–3
2023	(United Kingdom) Andy Murray	(Australia) Alex de Minaur	6–3, 6–3
2021–2022	Not Held		
2020	(Greece) Stefanos Tsitsipas	(Italy) Matteo Berrettini	7–6^{(7–4)}, 7–6^{(7–6)}
2019	(Croatia) Marin Čilić	(Spain) Fernando Verdasco	6–4, 6–4
2018	(Spain) Pablo Carreño Busta	(Australia) Matthew Ebden	6–7^{(6–8)}, 6–4, 6–2
2017	(Belgium) David Goffin	(Croatia) Ivo Karlović	7–6^{(7–2)}
2016	(Belgium) David Goffin	(Spain) Feliciano López	6–4, 6–2
2015	(Spain) Fernando Verdasco	(Ukraine) Alexandr Dolgopolov	7–6^{(7–3)}, retired
2014	(Japan) Kei Nishikori	(Czech Republic) Tomáš Berdych	6–4, 7–5
2013	(Australia) Lleyton Hewitt	(Argentina) Juan Martín del Potro	6–1, 6–4
2012	(Australia) Bernard Tomic	(United States) Mardy Fish	6–4, 3–6, 7–5
2011	(Australia) Lleyton Hewitt	(France) Gaël Monfils	7–5, 6–3
2010	(Spain) Fernando Verdasco	(France) Jo-Wilfried Tsonga	7–5, 6–3
2009	(Switzerland) Roger Federer	(Switzerland) Stanislas Wawrinka	6–1, 6–3
2008	(United States) Andy Roddick	(Cyprus) Marcos Baghdatis	7–5, 6–3
2007	(United States) Andy Roddick	(Switzerland) Roger Federer	6–2, 3–6, 6–3
2006	(United States) Andy Roddick	(Germany) Tommy Haas	6–3, 7–6^{(8–6)}
2005	(Switzerland) Roger Federer	(United States) Andy Roddick	6–4, 7–5
2004	(Argentina) David Nalbandian	(United States) Andre Agassi	6–2, 6–3
2003	(United States) Andre Agassi	(France) Sébastien Grosjean	6–2, 6–3
2002	(United States) Pete Sampras	(United States) Andre Agassi	7–6^{(8–6)}, 6–7^{(6–8)}, 6–3
2001	(United States) Andre Agassi	(Russia) Yevgeny Kafelnikov	6–3, 3–6, 6–3
2000	(United States) Andre Agassi	(Australia) Mark Philippoussis	walkover
1999	(Sweden) Thomas Enqvist	(Australia) Mark Philippoussis	6–4, 6–1
1998	(Australia) Mark Philippoussis	(United States) Andre Agassi	6–3, 7–6^{(7–3)}
1997	(United States) Michael Chang	(United States) Pete Sampras	4–6, 6–4, 6–2
1996	(United States) Michael Chang	(Russia) Yevgeny Kafelnikov	7–5, 6–1
1995	(United States) Michael Chang	(United States) Pete Sampras	7–6^{(7–4)}, 6–3
1994	Not Held		
1993	(Austria) Thomas Muster	(Russia) Alexander Volkov	6–3, 1–6, 7–6^{(7–1)}
1992	(Australia) Neil Borwick	(Australia) Richard Fromberg	6–7^{(5–7)}, 7–6^{(13–11)}, 7–6^{(7–5)}
1991	(Socialist Federal Republic of Yugoslavia) Goran Prpić	(Australia) Richard Fromberg	6–4, 6–7^{(6–8)}, 6–3
1990	(Australia) Darren Cahill	(Australia) Todd Woodbridge	6–2, 6–3
1989	(Australia) Mark Kratzmann	(Australia) Wally Masur	6–4, 1–6, 7–6
1988	(Australia) Pat Cash	(Australia) Wally Masur	6–4, 7–6^{(7–4)}
↑ Exhibition tournament ↑

=== Women's singles ===
Year	Champions	Runners-up	Score
2026	(Philippines) Alexandra Eala	(Croatia) Donna Vekić	6–3, 6–4
2025	Not Held		
2024	Mirra Andreeva	(United States) Danielle Collins	7–6(5), 6–1
2023	(Croatia) Donna Vekić	(Australia) Kimberly Birrell	2–6, 6–2, [10–8]
2019–2022	Not Held		
2018	(Switzerland) Belinda Bencic	(Germany) Andrea Petkovic	3–6, 6–4, [10–4]
2017	(Belgium) Yanina Wickmayer	(Romania) Sorana Cîrstea	6–4
1994–2016	Not Held		
1993	(Australia) Rachel McQuillan	(Australia) Nicole Provis	6–2, 3–6, 7–5
↑ Exhibition tournament ↑

== See also ==
- Australian Open Series
