= 2001 Colonial Classic – Draw =

Draw
- 2001 Colonial Classic

Final
- Champion: (United States) Andre Agassi
- Runner-up: (Russia) Yevgeny Kafelnikov
- Score: 6–3, 3–6, 6–3
← 2000 ·	Colonial Classic	· 2002 →

Andre Agassi was the defending champion, and won in the final 6–3, 3–6, 6–3, against Yevgeny Kafelnikov.

== Players ==
1. (Russia) Marat Safin (first round, withdrew due to an elbow injury)
2. (United States) Pete Sampras (first round, seventh place)
3. (Russia) Yevgeny Kafelnikov (final, second place)
4. (United States) Andre Agassi (champion, first place)
5. (Spain) Juan Carlos Ferrero (semifinals, third place)
6. (Australia) Patrick Rafter (first round, fifth place)
7. (Germany) Nicolas Kiefer (first round, eighth place)
8. (France) Nicolas Escudé (semifinals, fourth place)
9. (Ecuador) Nicolás Lapentti (replaced Marat Safin, sixth place)

== Draw ==
=== Key ===
- Q = Qualifier
- WC = Wild card
- LL = Lucky loser
- Alt = Alternate
- SE = Special exempt
- PR = Protected ranking
- ITF = ITF entry
- JE = Junior exempt
- w/o = Walkover
- r = Retired
- d = Defaulted
- SR = Special ranking

=== Main draw ===
First round
1	(Russia) Marat Safin	2	1
8	(France) Nicolas Escudé	6	6
4	(United States) Andre Agassi	7^{7}	3	6
7	(Germany) Nicolas Kiefer	6^{2}	6	2
6	(Australia) Patrick Rafter	2	2
3	(Russia) Yevgeny Kafelnikov	6	6
5	(Spain) Juan Carlos Ferrero	6	6
2	(United States) Pete Sampras	2	4

Semifinals
8	(France) Nicolas Escudé	6	5	1
4	(United States) Andre Agassi	3	7	6
3	(Russia) Yevgeny Kafelnikov	6	6
5	(Spain) Juan Carlos Ferrero	3	4

Final (First/Second place match)
4	(United States) Andre Agassi	6	3	6
3	(Russia) Yevgeny Kafelnikov	3	6	3
Third/Fourth place match
8	(France) Nicolas Escudé	3	5
5	(Spain) Juan Carlos Ferrero	6	7

=== Play-offs ===
First round
9	(Ecuador) Nicolás Lapentti	6^{4}	7	7^{7}
7	(Germany) Nicolas Kiefer	7^{7}	5	6^{2}
5	(Australia) Patrick Rafter	6	7^{7}
2	(United States) Pete Sampras	4	6^{5}

Fifth/Sixth place match
9	(Ecuador) Nicolás Lapentti	4	6^{4}
5	(Australia) Patrick Rafter	6	7^{7}
Seventh/Eighth place match
7	(Germany) Nicolas Kiefer	2	6^{5}
2	(United States) Pete Sampras	6	7^{7}
