= 1998 Colonial Classic – Draw =

Draw
- 1998 Colonial Classic

Final
- Champion: (Australia) Mark Philippoussis
- Runner-up: (United States) Andre Agassi
- Score: 6–3, 7–6(3)
← 1997 ·	Colonial Classic	· 1999 →

Michael Chang was the defending champion, but chose not to participate that year due to a stomach muscle strain.

Mark Philippoussis won in the final 6–3, 7–6(3), against Andre Agassi.

== Players ==
1. (United States) Pete Sampras (round robin, sixth place)
2. (United States) Michael Chang (withdrew due to a stomach muscle strain)
3. (United Kingdom) Greg Rusedski (round robin, seventh place)
4. (Austria) Thomas Muster (round robin, eighth place)
5. (Brazil) Gustavo Kuerten (round robin, third place)
6. (Croatia) Goran Ivanišević (round robin, fourth place)
7. (Australia) Mark Philippoussis (champion, first place)
8. (United States) Andre Agassi (final, second place)
9. (Ukraine) Andrei Medvedev (replaces Michael Chang, Round robin, fifth place)

== Draw ==
=== Key ===
- Q = Qualifier
- WC = Wild card
- LL = Lucky loser
- Alt = Alternate
- ITF = ITF entry
- PR = Protected ranking
- SR = Special ranking
- SE = Special exempt
- JE = Junior exempt
- JR = Junior Accelerator Programme entrant
- CO = College Accelerator Programme entrant
- NG = Next Gen Accelerator Program entrant
- w/o = Walkover
- r = Retired
- d = Defaulted

=== Finals ===
Final (First/Second place match)
7	(Australia) Mark Philippoussis	6	7^{7}
8	(United States) Andre Agassi	3	6^{3}

Third/Fourth place match
5	(Brazil) Gustavo Kuerten	6^{3}	6	6
6	(Croatia) Goran Ivanišević	7^{7}	4	2

Fifth/Sixth place match
1	(United States) Pete Sampras	6	3	2
9	(Ukraine) Andrei Medvedev	3	6	6

Seventh/Eighth place match
3	(United Kingdom) Greg Rusedski	6	7^{7}
4	(Austria) Thomas Muster	3	6^{3}

=== Group one ===
		(United States) Pete Sampras	(United Kingdom) Greg Rusedski	(Brazil) Gustavo Kuerten	(Australia) Mark Philippoussis	RR W–L	Set W–L	Game W–L	Standings
1	(United States) Pete Sampras		7–5, 6–1	6–3, 3–6, 4–6	—	1–1	3–2	26–21	3
3	(United Kingdom) Greg Rusedski	5–7, 1–6		—	5–7, 4–6	0–2	0–4	15–26	4
5	(Brazil) Gustavo Kuerten	3–6, 6–3, 6–4	—		4–6, 6–3, 6–7^{(8–10)}	1–1	3–3	31–29	2
7	(Australia) Mark Philippoussis	—	7–5, 6–4	6–4, 3–6, 7–6^{(10–8)}		2–0	4–1	29–25	1

Standings are determined by: 1. number of wins; 2. number of matches; 3. in two-players-ties, head-to-head records; 4. in three-players-ties, percentage of sets won, or of games won; 5. steering-committee decision.

=== Group two ===
		(United States) Michael Chang (Ukraine) Andrei Medvedev	(Austria) Thomas Muster	(Croatia) Goran Ivanišević	(United States) Andre Agassi	RR W–L	Set W–L	Game W–L	Standings
2; 9	(United States) Michael Chang (Ukraine) Andrei Medvedev		7–6^{(7–4)}, 6–0 (w/ Medvedev)	6–7^{(5–7)}, 3–6 (w/ Medvedev)	—	0–0; 1–1	0–0; 2–2	0–0; 22–19	N/A; 3
4	(Austria) Thomas Muster	6–7^{(4–7)}, 0–6 (w/ Medvedev)		—	4–6, 0–6	0–2	0–2	10–18	4
6	(Croatia) Goran Ivanišević	7–6^{(7–5)}, 6–3 (w/ Medvedev)	—		4–6, 7–6^{(7–3)}, 3–6	1–1	3–2	27–27	2
8	(United States) Andre Agassi	—	6–4, 6–0	6–4, 6–7^{(3–7)}, 6–3		2–0	4–1	30–18	1

Standings are determined by: 1. number of wins; 2. number of matches; 3. in two-players-ties, head-to-head records; 4. in three-players-ties, percentage of sets won, or of games won; 5. steering-committee decision.
