= 2009 AAMI Classic – Draw =

Draw
- 2009 AAMI Classic

Final
- Champion: (Switzerland) Roger Federer
- Runner-up: (Switzerland) Stanislas Wawrinka
- Score: 6–1, 6–3
← 2008 ·	AAMI Classic	· 2010 →

Andy Roddick was the defending champion, but chose not to participate that year.

Roger Federer won in the final 6–1, 6–3, against Stanislas Wawrinka.

== Players ==
1. (Switzerland) Roger Federer (champion, first place)
2. (Switzerland) Stanislas Wawrinka (final, second place)
3. (Chile) Fernando González (semifinals, fourth place)
4. (Spain) Fernando Verdasco (semifinals, third place)
5. (Croatia) Marin Čilić (first round, sixth place)
6. (Spain) Carlos Moyá (first round, seventh place)
7. (Cyprus) Marcos Baghdatis (first round, fifth place)
8. (Croatia) Ivan Ljubičić (first round, eighth place)

== Draw ==
=== Key ===
- Q = Qualifier
- WC = Wild card
- LL = Lucky loser
- Alt = Alternate
- SE = Special exempt
- PR = Protected ranking
- ITF = ITF entry
- JE = Junior exempt
- w/o = Walkover
- r = Retired
- d = Defaulted
- SR = Special ranking

=== Main draw ===
First round
1	(Switzerland) Roger Federer	6	6
6	(Spain) Carlos Moyá	2	3
4	(Spain) Fernando Verdasco	6	7
5	(Croatia) Marin Čilić	2	5
8	(Croatia) Ivan Ljubičić	4	3
3	(Chile) Fernando González	6	6
7	(Cyprus) Marcos Baghdatis	2	2
2	(Switzerland) Stanislas Wawrinka	6	6

Semifinals
1	(Switzerland) Roger Federer	6	3	7^{7}
4	(Spain) Fernando Verdasco	3	6	6^{5}
3	(Chile) Fernando González	6^{3}	7^{7}	4
2	(Switzerland) Stanislas Wawrinka	7^{7}	6^{1}	6

Final (First/Second place match)
1	(Switzerland) Roger Federer	6	6
2	(Switzerland) Stanislas Wawrinka	1	3
Third/Fourth place match
4	(Spain) Fernando Verdasco	6	6
3	(Chile) Fernando González	4	3

=== Play-offs ===
First round
6	(Spain) Carlos Moyá	3	6^{1}
5	(Croatia) Marin Čilić	6	7^{7}
8	(Croatia) Ivan Ljubičić	6^{3}	4
7	(Cyprus) Marcos Baghdatis	7^{7}	6

Fifth/Sixth place match
5	(Croatia) Marin Čilić	3	2
7	(Cyprus) Marcos Baghdatis	6	6
Seventh/Eighth place match
6	(Spain) Carlos Moyá	7	3	7
8	(Croatia) Ivan Ljubičić	5	6	5
