= 2006 AAMI Classic – Draw =

Draw
- 2006 AAMI Classic

Final
- Champion: (United States) Andy Roddick
- Runner-up: (Germany) Tommy Haas
- Score: 6–3, 7–6^{(8–6)}
| ← 2005 · | AAMI Classic | · 2007 → |

Roger Federer was the defending champion, but lost in the first round to Tommy Haas.

Andy Roddick won in the final 6–3, 7–6^{(8–6)}, against Tommy Haas.

== Players ==
1. (Switzerland) Roger Federer (first round, fifth place)
2. (United States) Andy Roddick (champion, first place)
3. (Argentina) David Nalbandian (first round, retired/withdrew due to a stomach virus)
4. (Argentina) Guillermo Coria (semifinals, third place)
5. (Croatia) Ivan Ljubičić (first round, seventh place)
6. (Germany) Nicolas Kiefer (semifinals, retired/withdrew due to an ankle injury)
7. (France) Gaël Monfils (first round, eighth place)
8. (Germany) Tommy Haas (final, second place)
9. (Belarus) Max Mirnyi (replaced David Nalbandian, Sixth place/replaced Nicolas Kiefer, fourth place)

== Draw ==
=== Key ===
- Q = Qualifier
- WC = Wild card
- LL = Lucky loser
- Alt = Alternate
- SE = Special exempt
- PR = Protected ranking
- ITF = ITF entry
- JE = Junior exempt
- w/o = Walkover
- r = Retired
- d = Defaulted
- SR = Special ranking

=== Main draw ===
First round
1 | (Switzerland) Roger Federer | 6 | 4 | 4
8 | (Germany) Tommy Haas | 3 | 6 | 6
4 | (Argentina) Guillermo Coria | 6 | 6
5 | (Croatia) Ivan Ljubičić | 2 | 2
6 | (Germany) Nicolas Kiefer | 6 | 3
3 | (Argentina) David Nalbandian | 3 | 2^{r}
7 | (France) Gaël Monfils | 2 | 2
2 | (United States) Andy Roddick | 6 | 6

Semifinals
8 | (Germany) Tommy Haas | 6 | 6
4 | (Argentina) Guillermo Coria | 4 | 4
6 | (Germany) Nicolas Kiefer | 1^{r}
2 | (United States) Andy Roddick | 0

Final (First/Second place match)
8 | (Germany) Tommy Haas | 3 | 6^{6}
2 | (United States) Andy Roddick | 6 | 7^{8}
Third/Fourth place match
4 | (Argentina) Guillermo Coria | 6 | 7^{8}
9 | (Belarus) Max Mirnyi | 1 | 6^{6}

=== Play-offs ===
First round
1 | (Switzerland) Roger Federer | 6 | 6
5 | (Croatia) Ivan Ljubičić | 4 | 3
9 | (Belarus) Max Mirnyi | 6 | 7
7 | (France) Gaël Monfils | 2 | 5

Fifth/Sixth place match
1 | (Switzerland) Roger Federer | 6^{1} | 6 | 7^{7}
9 | (Belarus) Max Mirnyi | 7^{7} | 4 | 6^{1}
Seventh/Eighth place match
5 | (Croatia) Ivan Ljubičić | 6 | 6
7 | (France) Gaël Monfils | 3 | 1
