= 2008 AAMI Classic – Draw =

Draw
- 2008 AAMI Classic

Final
- Champion: (United States) Andy Roddick
- Runner-up: (Cyprus) Marcos Baghdatis
- Score: 7–5, 6–3
← 2007 ·	AAMI Classic	· 2009 →

Andy Roddick was the defending champion, and won in the final 7–5, 6–3, against Marcos Baghdatis.

== Players ==
1. (Russia) Nikolay Davydenko (first round, seventh place)
2. (United States) Andy Roddick (champion, first place)
3. (Chile) Fernando González (semifinals, fourth place)
4. (United Kingdom) Andy Murray (first round, fifth place)
5. (Cyprus) Marcos Baghdatis (final, second place)
6. (Croatia) Ivan Ljubičić (first round, eighth place)
7. (Russia) Marat Safin (semifinals, third place)
8. (Australia) Brydan Klein (first round, sixth place)

== Draw ==
=== Key ===
- Q = Qualifier
- WC = Wild card
- LL = Lucky loser
- Alt = Alternate
- SE = Special exempt
- PR = Protected ranking
- ITF = ITF entry
- JE = Junior exempt
- w/o = Walkover
- r = Retired
- d = Defaulted
- SR = Special ranking

=== Main draw ===
First round
1	(Russia) Nikolay Davydenko	4	6	1
5	(Cyprus) Marcos Baghdatis	6	4	6
3	(Chile) Fernando González	7^{7}	6
8	(Australia) Brydan Klein	6^{3}	4
7	(Russia) Marat Safin	6	6
4	(United Kingdom) Andy Murray	1	4
6	(Croatia) Ivan Ljubičić	3	0
2	(United States) Andy Roddick	6	6

Semifinals
5	(Cyprus) Marcos Baghdatis	6	7
3	(Chile) Fernando González	2	5
7	(Russia) Marat Safin	3	3
2	(United States) Andy Roddick	6	6

Final (First/Second place match)
5	(Cyprus) Marcos Baghdatis	5	3
2	(United States) Andy Roddick	7	6
Third/Fourth place match
3	(Chile) Fernando González	3	3
7	(Russia) Marat Safin	6	6

=== Play-offs ===
First round
1	(Russia) Nikolay Davydenko
8	(Australia) Brydan Klein	w/o
4	(United Kingdom) Andy Murray	6^{7}	6	6
6	(Croatia) Ivan Ljubičić	7^{9}	4	2

Fifth/Sixth place match
8	(Australia) Brydan Klein	2	6^{4}
4	(United Kingdom) Andy Murray	6	7^{7}
Seventh/Eighth place match
1	(Russia) Nikolay Davydenko	6	7^{7}
6	(Croatia) Ivan Ljubičić	0	6^{1}
