= 1999 Colonial Classic – Draw =

Draw
- 1999 Colonial Classic

Final
- Champion: (Sweden) Thomas Enqvist
- Runner-up: (Australia) Mark Philippoussis
- Score: 6–4, 6–1
← 1998 ·	Colonial Classic	· 2000 →

Mark Philippoussis was the defending Tennis champion, but Thomas Enqvist defeated him 6–4, 6–1, in the final.

== Players ==
1. (United States) Andre Agassi (semifinals, third place)
2. (United Kingdom) Tim Henman (first round, eighth place)
3. (Russia) Yevgeny Kafelnikov (first round, fifth place)
4. (Croatia) Goran Ivanišević (first round, withdrew due to a back injury)
5. (Czech Republic) Petr Korda (first round, sixth place)
6. (Australia) Mark Philippoussis (final, second place)
7. (Sweden) Thomas Enqvist (champion, first place)
8. (United States) Michael Chang (semifinals, fourth place)
9. (Sweden) Mikael Tillström (replaced Goran Ivanišević, seventh place)

== Draw ==
=== Key ===
- Q = Qualifier
- WC = Wild card
- LL = Lucky loser
- Alt = Alternate
- SE = Special exempt
- PR = Protected ranking
- ITF = ITF entry
- JE = Junior exempt
- w/o = Walkover
- r = Retired
- d = Defaulted
- SR = Special ranking

=== Main draw ===
First round
1	(United States) Andre Agassi	6	6
5	(Czech Republic) Petr Korda	2	1
4	(Croatia) Goran Ivanišević	6^{4}	6^{5}
7	(Sweden) Thomas Enqvist	7^{7}	7^{7}
6	(Australia) Mark Philippoussis	2	6	6
3	(Russia) Yevgeny Kafelnikov	6	4	4
8	(United States) Michael Chang	6^{5}	6	7
2	(United Kingdom) Tim Henman	7^{7}	3	5

Semifinals
1	(United States) Andre Agassi	3	6^{1}
7	(Sweden) Thomas Enqvist	6	7^{7}
6	(Australia) Mark Philippoussis	6^{2}	7	6
8	(United States) Michael Chang	7^{7}	5	3

Final (First/Second place match)
7	(Sweden) Thomas Enqvist	6	6
6	(Australia) Mark Philippoussis	4	1
Third/Fourth place match
1	(United States) Andre Agassi	6	6
8	(United States) Michael Chang	3	2

=== Play-offs ===
First round
5	(Czech Republic) Petr Korda	7^{11}	6
4	(Croatia) Goran Ivanišević	6^{9}	2
3	(Russia) Yevgeny Kafelnikov	6	1	6
2	(United Kingdom) Tim Henman	2	6	2

Fifth/Sixth place match
5	(Czech Republic) Petr Korda	6	1	2
3	(Russia) Yevgeny Kafelnikov	1	6	6
Seventh/Eighth place match
9	(Sweden) Mikael Tillström	7	6
2	(United Kingdom) Tim Henman	5	1
