= 2005 Kooyong Classic – Draw =

Draw
- 2005 Kooyong Classic

Final
- Champion: (Switzerland) Roger Federer
- Runner-up: (United States) Andy Roddick
- Score: 6–4, 7–5
← 2004 ·	Kooyong Classic	· 2006 →

David Nalbandian was the defending champion, but lost in the first round to Tim Henman.

Roger Federer won in the final 6–4, 7–5, against Andy Roddick.

== Players ==
1. (Switzerland) 'Roger Federer (champion, first place)
2. (United States) Andy Roddick (final, second place)
3. (United Kingdom) Tim Henman (semifinals, third place)
4. (United States) Andre Agassi (semifinals, fourth place)
5. (Argentina) David Nalbandian (first round, fifth place)
6. (Argentina) Gastón Gaudio (first round, eighth place)
7. (Chile) Nicolás Massú (first round, retired due to a foot injury, sixth place)
8. (Croatia) Ivan Ljubičić (first round, seventh place)

== Draw ==
=== Key ===
- Q = Qualifier
- WC = Wild card
- LL = Lucky loser
- Alt = Alternate
- SE = Special exempt
- PR = Protected ranking
- ITF = ITF entry
- JE = Junior exempt
- w/o = Walkover
- r = Retired
- d = Defaulted
- SR = Special ranking

=== Main draw ===
First round
1	(Switzerland) Roger Federer	5	6	6
6	(Argentina) Gastón Gaudio	7	1	4
3	(United Kingdom) Tim Henman	6	7
5	(Argentina) David Nalbandian	1	5
7	(Chile) Nicolás Massú	1	6^{4}
4	(United States) Andre Agassi	6	7^{7}
8	(Croatia) Ivan Ljubičić	1	4
2	(United States) Andy Roddick	6	6

Semifinals
1	(Switzerland) Roger Federer	6	6
3	(United Kingdom) Tim Henman	4	2
4	(United States) Andre Agassi	5^{r}
2	(United States) Andy Roddick	6

Final (First/Second place match)
1	(Switzerland) Roger Federer	6	7
2	(United States) Andy Roddick	4	5
Third/Fourth place match
3	(United Kingdom) Tim Henman	6	6^{5}	7
4	(United States) Andre Agassi	3	7^{7}	5

=== Play-offs ===
First round
6	(Argentina) Gastón Gaudio	3	1
5	(Argentina) David Nalbandian	6	6
7	(Chile) Nicolás Massú	6	6
8	(Croatia) Ivan Ljubičić	4	4

Fifth/Sixth place match
5	(Argentina) David Nalbandian	6	2
7	(Chile) Nicolás Massú	4	1^{r}
Seventh/Eighth place match
6	(Argentina) Gastón Gaudio	4	4
8	(Croatia) Ivan Ljubičić	6	6
