= 2011 AAMI Classic =

- 2011 AAMI Classic

Final
- Champion: (Australia) Lleyton Hewitt
- Runner-up: (France) Gaël Monfils
- Score: 7–5, 6–3
- AAMI Classic

The 2011 AAMI Classic will take place between 12–15 January 2011, at the Kooyong Stadium in Melbourne, Australia. Fernando Verdasco was the defending champion, but lost in the first round to Gaël Monfils.
Lleyton Hewitt won in the final against Gaël Monfils 7–5, 6–3.

== Seeds ==
1. (Czech Republic) Tomáš Berdych (first round)
2. (Spain) Fernando Verdasco (first round)
3. (Russia) Mikhail Youzhny (first round)
4. (Austria) Jürgen Melzer (semifinals, third place)
5. (France) Gaël Monfils (final, second place)
6. (France) Jo-Wilfried Tsonga (first round)
7. (Russia) Nikolay Davydenko (semifinals, fourth place)
8. (Australia) Lleyton Hewitt (champion, first place)

== Draw ==
Key

- Q = Qualifier
- WC = Wild card
- LL = Lucky loser
- Alt = Alternate
- ITF = ITF entry
- PR = Protected ranking
- SR = Special ranking
- SE = Special exempt
- JE = Junior exempt
- JR = Junior Accelerator Programme entrant
- CO = College Accelerator Programme entrant
- NG = Next Gen Accelerator Program entrant
- w/o = Walkover
- r = Retired
- d = Defaulted

=== Main draw ===
First round
1	(Czech Republic) Tomáš Berdych	5	6	3
7	(Russia) Nikolay Davydenko	7	3	6
8	(Australia) Lleyton Hewitt	7	4	6
3	(Russia) Mikhail Youzhny	5	6	4
4	(Austria) Jürgen Melzer	8
6	(France) Jo-Wilfried Tsonga	6
5	(France) Gaël Monfils	4	7^{7}	6
2	(Spain) Fernando Verdasco	6	6^{5}	4

Semifinals
7	(Russia) Nikolay Davydenko	3	6^{3}
8	(Australia) Lleyton Hewitt	6	7^{7}
4	(Austria) Jürgen Melzer	6	2	6^{4}
5	(France) Gaël Monfils	2	6	7

Final (First/Second place match)
8	(Australia) Lleyton Hewitt	7	6
5	(France) Gaël Monfils	5	3
Third/Fourth place match
7	(Russia) Nikolay Davydenko	6^{4}	2
4	(Austria) Jürgen Melzer	7^{7}	6

=== Play-offs ===
First round
1	(Czech Republic) Tomáš Berdych
3	(Russia) Mikhail Youzhny
6	(France) Jo-Wilfried Tsonga
2	(Spain) Fernando Verdasco

Fifth/Sixth place match
Seventh/Eighth place match

=== Notes ===
After the second day of matches was canceled due to rain, the first-round match between Tsonga and Melzer was converted to a single 'pro set' (first to eight games, by a margin of two) instead of the standard best of three, in order to save time and enable the second-round matches to be played later on the same day. (Melzer won 8-6).

The play-offs were also delayed and ultimately cancelled due to rain delays.
