= 1949 Davis Cup =

1949 edition of the Davis Cup

Details
- Duration: 28 April – 28 August 1949
- Edition: 38th
- Teams: 26

Champion
- Winning nation: United States

The 1949 Davis Cup was the 38th edition of the most important tournament between national teams in men's tennis. 24 teams would enter the Europe Zone, and 4 teams would enter the America Zone. Israel made its first appearance in the competition.

Australia defeated Mexico in the America Zone final, and Italy defeated France in the Europe Zone final. Australia defeated Italy in the Inter-Zonal play-off, but fell to defending champions the United States in the Challenge Round, giving the Americans their 4th straight title and 16th overall. The final was played at the West Side Tennis Club in Forest Hills, New York, United States on 26–28 August.

== America Zone ==
=== Draw ===
Semifinals; 2–23 July
Montreal, Canada (grass)
Australia	4
Canada	1
Havana, Cuba
Cuba	1
Mexico	4

Final; 29–31 July
Wilmington, DE, United States (grass)
Australia	5
Mexico	0

=== Final ===
Australia vs. Mexico

Australia
5
Wilmington Country Club, Wilmington, DE, United States
29–31 July 1949
Grass

Mexico
0

			1	2	3	4	5
1	(Australia) (Mexico)	Frank Sedgman; Armando Vega	12; 10	4; 6	6; 4	1; 6	6; 3
2	(Australia) (Mexico)	John Bromwich; Rolando Vega	6; 0	6; 2	6; 1
3	(Australia) (Mexico)	John Bromwich / Frank Sedgman; Armando Vega / Rolando Vega	6; 0	6; 4	6; 2
4	(Australia) (Mexico)	John Bromwich; Armando Vega	6; 0	6; 1	6; 4
5	(Australia) (Mexico)	Bill Sidwell; Miguel Ángel Reyes-Varela	6; 2	6; 2	6; 1

== Europe Zone ==
=== Draw ===
First Round; 28 April–3 May
Switzerland
bye
Greece
bye
Hungary
bye
Belgium
bye
Denmark	5
Israel	0
Luxembourg	0
France	5
Portugal	0
Great Britain	5
Czechoslovakia	5
Monaco	0
Netherlands	0
South Africa	5
Italy	w/o
Turkey
Ireland	2
Chile	3
Egypt	w/o
Argentina
bye
Sweden
bye
Norway
bye
Austria
bye
Yugoslavia

Second Round; 6–17 May
Switzerland	w/o
Greece
Budapest, Hungary
Hungary	4
Belgium	1
Paris, France (clay)
Denmark	1
France	4
Wimbledon, England (grass)
Great Britain	1
Czechoslovakia	4
Milan, Italy (clay)
South Africa	1
Italy	4
Birmingham, England (grass)
Chile	3
Egypt	2
Stockholm, Sweden (clay)
Sweden	5
Norway	0
Vienna, Austria
Austria	1
Yugoslavia	4

Quarterfinals; 9–16 June
Budapest, Hungary
Switzerland	0
Hungary	5
Paris, France (clay)
France	3
Czechoslovakia	2
Turin, Italy (clay)
Italy	4
Chile	1
Zagreb, Yugoslavia (clay)
Sweden	2
Yugoslavia	3

Semifinals; 8–11 July
Budapest, Hungary
Hungary	2
France	3
Rome, Italy (clay)
Italy	4
Yugoslavia	1

Final; 23–25 July
Paris, France (clay)
France	2
Italy	3

=== Final ===
France vs. Italy

France
2
Stade Roland Garros, Paris, France
23–25 July 1949
Clay

Italy
3

			1	2	3	4	5
1	(France) (Italy)	Robert Abdesselam; Giovanni Cucelli	6; 1	8; 6	8; 10	4; 6	2; 6
2	(France) (Italy)	Marcel Bernard; Marcello del Bello	6; 4	6; 3	4; 6	2; 6	10; 8
3	(France) (Italy)	Marcel Bernard / Henri Bolleli; Marcello del Bello / Giovanni Cucelli	6; 3	1; 6	6; 4	0; 6	2; 6
4	(France) (Italy)	Robert Abdesselam; Marcello del Bello	6; 3	6; 4	6; 2
5	(France) (Italy)	Marcel Bernard; Giovanni Cucelli	6; 8	6; 3	6; 4	0; 6	1; 6

== Inter-Zonal Final ==
Australia vs. Italy

Australia
5
Westchester Country Club, Rye, NY, United States
12–15 August 1949
Grass

Italy
0

			1	2	3	4	5
1	(Australia) (Italy)	Bill Sidwell; Giovanni Cucelli	6; 2	6; 4	2; 6	6; 2
2	(Australia) (Italy)	Frank Sedgman; Marcello del Bello	6; 0	6; 4	6; 4
3	(Australia) (Italy)	John Bromwich / Frank Sedgman; Marcello del Bello / Giovanni Cucelli	2; 6	6; 2	6; 2	6; 1
4	(Australia) (Italy)	Bill Sidwell; Marcello del Bello	6; 1	6; 1	6; 0
5	(Australia) (Italy)	Frank Sedgman; Giovanni Cucelli	1; 6	6; 1	6; 2	6; 2

== Challenge Round ==
United States vs. Australia

United States
4
West Side Tennis Club, Forest Hills, NY, United States
26–28 August 1949
Grass

Australia
1

			1	2	3	4	5
1	(United States) (Australia)	Ted Schroeder; Bill Sidwell	6; 1	5; 7	4; 6	6; 2	6; 3
2	(United States) (Australia)	Pancho Gonzales; Frank Sedgman	8; 6	6; 4	9; 7
3	(United States) (Australia)	Gardnar Mulloy / Bill Talbert; John Bromwich / Bill Sidwell	6; 3	6; 4	8; 10	7; 9	7; 9
4	(United States) (Australia)	Ted Schroeder; Frank Sedgman	6; 4	6; 3	6; 3
5	(United States) (Australia)	Pancho Gonzales; Bill Sidwell	6; 1	6; 3	6; 3
