= 2003 Commonwealth Bank International – Draw =

Draw
- 2003 Commonwealth Bank International

Final
- Champion: (United States) Andre Agassi
- Runner-up: (France) Sébastien Grosjean
- Score: 6–2, 6–3
- Commonwealth Bank International

Pete Sampras was the defending champion, but chose not to participate that year.

Andre Agassi won in the final 6–2, 6–3, against Sébastien Grosjean.

== Players ==
1. (United States) Andre Agassi (champion, first place)
2. (France) Sébastien Grosjean (final, second place)
3. (Spain) Àlex Corretja (first round, fifth place)
4. (Morocco) Younes El Aynaoui (first round, sixth place)
5. (Belgium) Xavier Malisse (first round, retired/withdrew due to a left leg injury)
6. (Sweden) Thomas Enqvist (first round, eighth place)
7. (France) Richard Gasquet (semifinals, third place)
8. (Australia) Mark Philippoussis (semifinals, fourth place)
9. (Morocco) Hicham Arazi (replaced Xavier Malisse, seventh place)

== Draw ==
Key

- Q = Qualifier
- WC = Wild card
- LL = Lucky loser
- Alt = Alternate
- ITF = ITF entry
- PR = Protected ranking
- SR = Special ranking
- SE = Special exempt
- JE = Junior exempt
- JR = Junior Accelerator Programme entrant
- CO = College Accelerator Programme entrant
- NG = Next Gen Accelerator Program entrant
- w/o = Walkover
- r = Retired
- d = Defaulted

=== Main draw ===
First round
1	(United States) Andre Agassi	7^{7}	6
6	(Sweden) Thomas Enqvist	6^{5}	3
4	(Morocco) Younes El Aynaoui	6^{1}	3
7	(France) Richard Gasquet	7^{7}	6
8	(Australia) Mark Philippoussis	5	6	7^{7}
3	(Spain) Àlex Corretja	7	4	6^{5}
5	(Belgium) Xavier Malisse	6	4	0^{r}
2	(France) Sébastien Grosjean	2	6	1

Semifinals
1	(United States) Andre Agassi	6	5	6
7	(France) Richard Gasquet	2	7	2
8	(Australia) Mark Philippoussis	3	7^{8}	2
2	(France) Sébastien Grosjean	6	6^{6}	6

Final (First/Second place match)
1	(United States) Andre Agassi	6	6
2	(France) Sébastien Grosjean	2	3
Third/Fourth place match
7	(France) Richard Gasquet	7	6
8	(Australia) Mark Philippoussis	5	2

=== Play-offs ===
First round
6	(Sweden) Thomas Enqvist	4	4
4	(Morocco) Younes El Aynaoui	6	6
3	(Spain) Àlex Corretja	6	6
9	(Morocco) Hicham Arazi	3	4

Fifth/Sixth place match
4	(Morocco) Younes El Aynaoui	3	6	6^{2}
3	(Spain) Àlex Corretja	6	3	7^{7}
Seventh/Eighth place match
6	(Sweden) Thomas Enqvist	6	4	1
9	(Morocco) Hicham Arazi	2	6	6
