= 1946 Davis Cup =

1946 edition of the Davis Cup

Details
- Duration: 2 May – 30 December 1946
- Edition: 35th
- Teams: 19

Champion
- Winning nation: United States

The 1946 Davis Cup was the 35th edition of the most important tournament between national teams in men's tennis. The trophy and tournament were renamed for the founder, Dwight F. Davis, upon his death in 1945. This was the first edition since the end of World War II. 15 teams entered the Europe Zone, and 5 teams entered the America Zone.

The United States defeated Mexico in the America Zone final, and Sweden defeated Yugoslavia in the Europe Zone final. The USA defeated Sweden in the Inter-Zonal play-off, and then defeated defending champions Australia in the Challenge Round. The final was played at Kooyong Stadium in Melbourne, Australia on 26–30 December.

== America Zone ==
=== Draw ===
Quarterfinals; 14–16 June
Canada
bye
Mexico
bye
St. Louis, MO, United States (clay)
United States	5
Philippines	0
bye
New Zealand

Semifinals; 13–15 June
Montreal, Canada (grass)
Canada	0
Mexico	5
United States	w/o
New Zealand

Final; 29 June–1 July
South Orange, NJ, United States (grass)
Mexico	0
United States	5

=== Final ===
United States vs. Mexico

United States
5
Orange Lawn Tennis Club, South Orange, NJ, United States
29 June–1 July 1946
Grass

Mexico
0

			1	2	3	4	5
1	(United States) (Mexico)	Frank Parker; Rolando Vega	6; 0	6; 0	6; 2
2	(United States) (Mexico)	Bill Talbert; Armando Vega	6; 1	6; 2	6; 1
3	(United States) (Mexico)	Gardnar Mulloy / Bill Talbert; Armando Vega / Rolando Vega	6; 0	9; 7	6; 2
4	(United States) (Mexico)	Frank Parker; Armando Vega	6; 3	6; 3	6; 2
5	(United States) (Mexico)	Gardnar Mulloy; Francisco Guerrero Arcocha	6; 3	6; 4	6; 4

== Europe Zone ==
=== Draw ===
First round 2–12 May
Ireland
bye
Stockholm, Sweden (clay)
Sweden	5
Netherlands	0
Brussels, Belgium
Belgium	5
Monaco	0
Copenhagen, Denmark (clay)
Denmark	1
Taiwan	4
Paris, France (clay)
France	5
Great Britain	0
Barcelona, Spain (clay)
Spain	2
Switzerland	3
Zagreb, Yugoslavia
Yugoslavia	5
Egypt	0
Turkey
Czechoslovakia	w/o

Quarterfinals; 24–26 May
Stockholm, Sweden (clay)
Ireland	0
Sweden	5
Brussels, Belgium
Belgium	3
Taiwan	2
Montreux, Switzerland
France	3
Switzerland	2
Prague, Czechoslovakia
Yugoslavia	3
Czechoslovakia	2

Semifinals; 9–14 June
Stockholm, Sweden (clay)
Sweden	4
Belgium	1
Paris, France (clay)
France	2
Yugoslavia	3

Final; 14–17 July
Varberg, Sweden (clay)
Sweden	3
Yugoslavia	2

=== Final ===
Sweden vs. Yugoslavia

Sweden
3
Centercourt, Varberg, Sweden
14–17 July 1946
Clay

Yugoslavia
2

			1	2	3	4	5
1	(Sweden) (Socialist Federal Republic of Yugoslavia)	Torsten Johansson; Dragutin Mitić	6; 4	6; 1	1; 6	2; 6	0; 6
2	(Sweden) (Socialist Federal Republic of Yugoslavia)	Lennart Bergelin; Josip Palada	2; 6	2; 6	3; 6
3	(Sweden) (Socialist Federal Republic of Yugoslavia)	Lennart Bergelin / Torsten Johansson; Dragutin Mitić / Josip Palada	6; 1	3; 6	3; 6	8; 6	6; 2
4	(Sweden) (Socialist Federal Republic of Yugoslavia)	Torsten Johansson; Josip Palada	6; 3	6; 4	6; 4
5	(Sweden) (Socialist Federal Republic of Yugoslavia)	Lennart Bergelin; Dragutin Mitić	5; 7	3; 6	6; 3	6; 1	10; 8

== Inter-Zonal Final ==
United States vs. Sweden

United States
5
West Side Tennis Club, Forest Hills, NY, United States
13–15 September 1946
Grass

Sweden
0

			1	2	3	4	5
1	(United States) (Sweden)	Jack Kramer; Torsten Johansson	6; 2	6; 2	6; 2
2	(United States) (Sweden)	Frank Parker; Lennart Bergelin	6; 0	6; 3	6; 1
3	(United States) (Sweden)	Gardnar Mulloy / Bill Talbert; Lennart Bergelin / Torsten Johansson	3; 6	9; 7	3; 6	6; 0	8; 6
4	(United States) (Sweden)	Jack Kramer; Lennart Bergelin	6; 2	6; 2	8; 6
5	(United States) (Sweden)	Frank Parker; Torsten Johansson	9; 7	6; 2	6; 1

== Challenge Round ==
Australia vs. United States

Australia
0
Kooyong Stadium, Melbourne, Australia
26–30 December 1946
Grass

United States
5

			1	2	3	4	5
1	(Australia) (United States)	John Bromwich; Ted Schroeder	6; 3	1; 6	2; 6	6; 0	3; 6
2	(Australia) (United States)	Dinny Pails; Jack Kramer	6; 8	2; 6	7; 9
3	(Australia) (United States)	John Bromwich / Adrian Quist; Jack Kramer / Ted Schroeder	2; 6	5; 7	4; 6
4	(Australia) (United States)	John Bromwich; Jack Kramer	6; 8	4; 6	4; 6
5	(Australia) (United States)	Dinny Pails; Gardnar Mulloy	3; 6	3; 6	4; 6
