= Kooyong Stadium =

Australian tennis venue

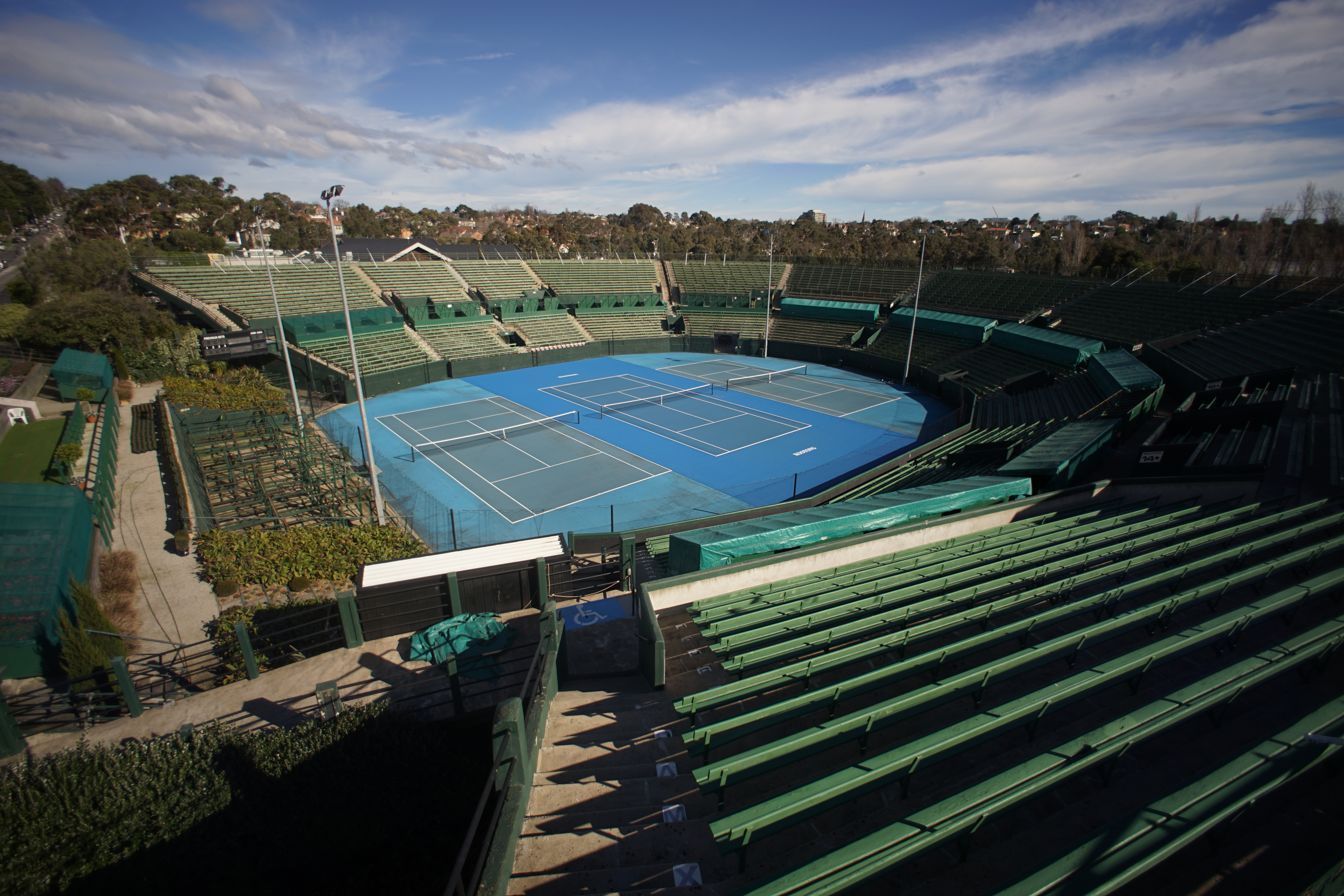
- Centre Court in January 2014
- Interactive map of Kooyong Stadium
- Location: 489 Glenferrie Road; Toorak, Victoria
- Coordinates: 37°50′18″S 145°01′55″E
- Owner: Kooyong Lawn Tennis Club
- Capacity: 5,000
- Surface: Plexicushion

Construction
- Opened: 1927
- Renovated: 1934

Tenants
- Kooyong Classic; Australian Open (1972–1987)

Website
- www.kooyong.com.au

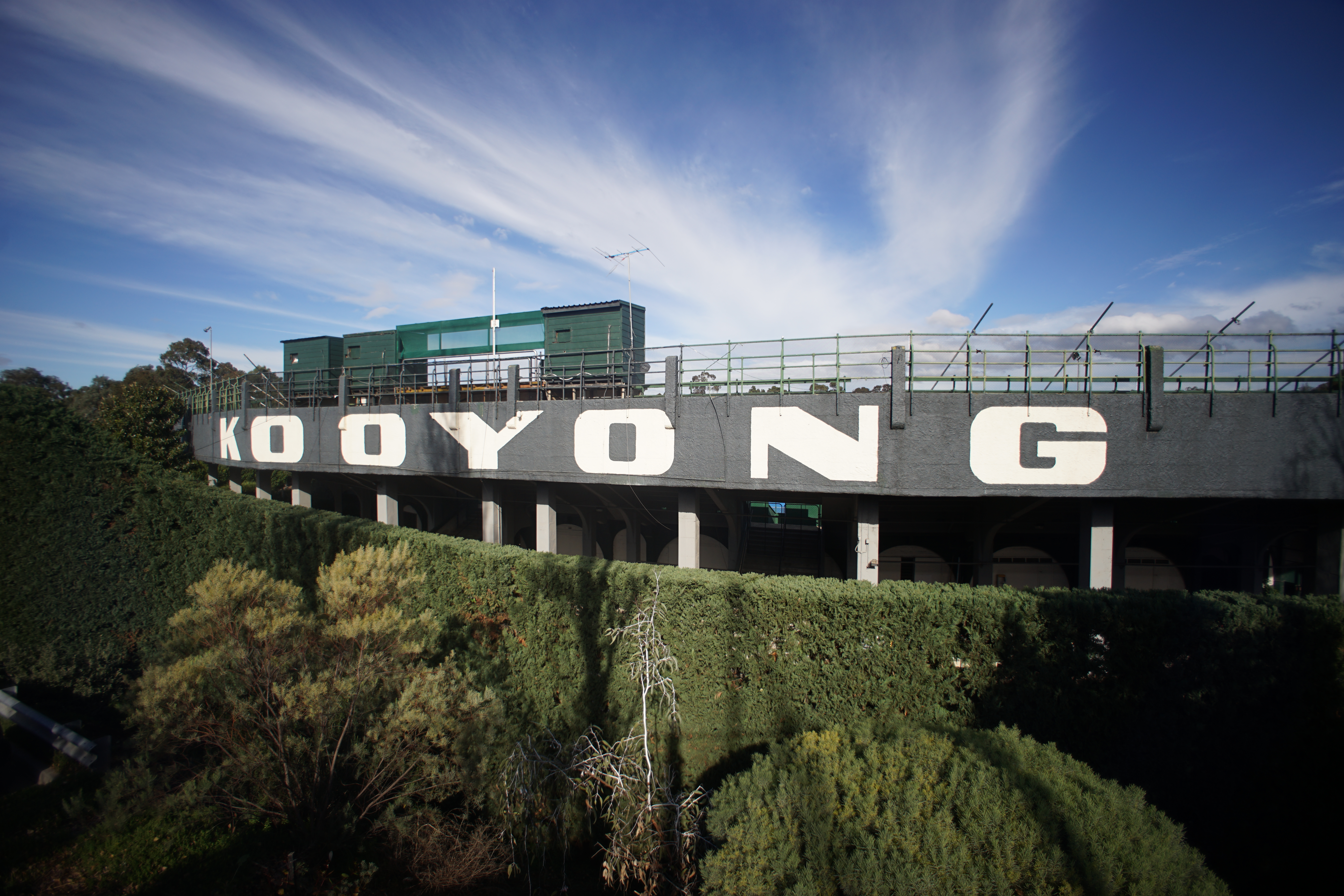
Exterior grandstand showing iconic lettering and broadcast boxes

Kooyong Stadium, at the Kooyong Lawn Tennis Club, is an Australian tennis venue, located in the Melbourne suburb of Toorak, adjacent to the namesake suburb of Kooyong. The stadium was built in 1927, and has undergone several renovations.

It has a seating capacity of slightly more than 5,000. At its peak the stadium was capable of hosting up to 15,000 patrons.

== History ==
Kooyong was the venue for the Australian Open whenever that tournament was held in Melbourne, becoming the permanent venue from 1972 to 1987. It was the last Australian Open venue to play on grass courts.

The tournament was moved to the hard courts of Melbourne Park in 1988. Now a hard-court surface, it remains the venue for the Kooyong Classic exhibition tournament.

Kooyong has also hosted several Davis Cup ties and finals, including the 1986 Davis Cup Final which saw Australia defeat two-time defending champions Sweden 3–2 in late December. The stadium hosted a tie for the 2016 Davis Cup against the USA in March 2016 on a portable grass court.

In 2019 the club demolished the upper western and southern stands, revising the seating capacity to approximately 5,000. The venue had previously been capable of seating 8,500 spectators.

== Concerts ==
The venue has also hosted several concerts:

- On 24 October 1971, Elton John performed a concert there.
- On 20 February 1972, Led Zeppelin held a large open-air concert at the venue as part of its Australasian Tour.
- On 13 January 1973, Black Sabbath performed a concert there.
- On 17–18 February 1973, the Rolling Stones played three shows there as part of their 1973 Pacific Tour.
- On 16-17 February 1985, Greek singers George Dalaras and Dimitra Galani performed two concerts there.
- In February 1986, Bob Dylan performed three concerts there.
- In November 1987, David Bowie performed four concerts at the venue.

== Notable members ==
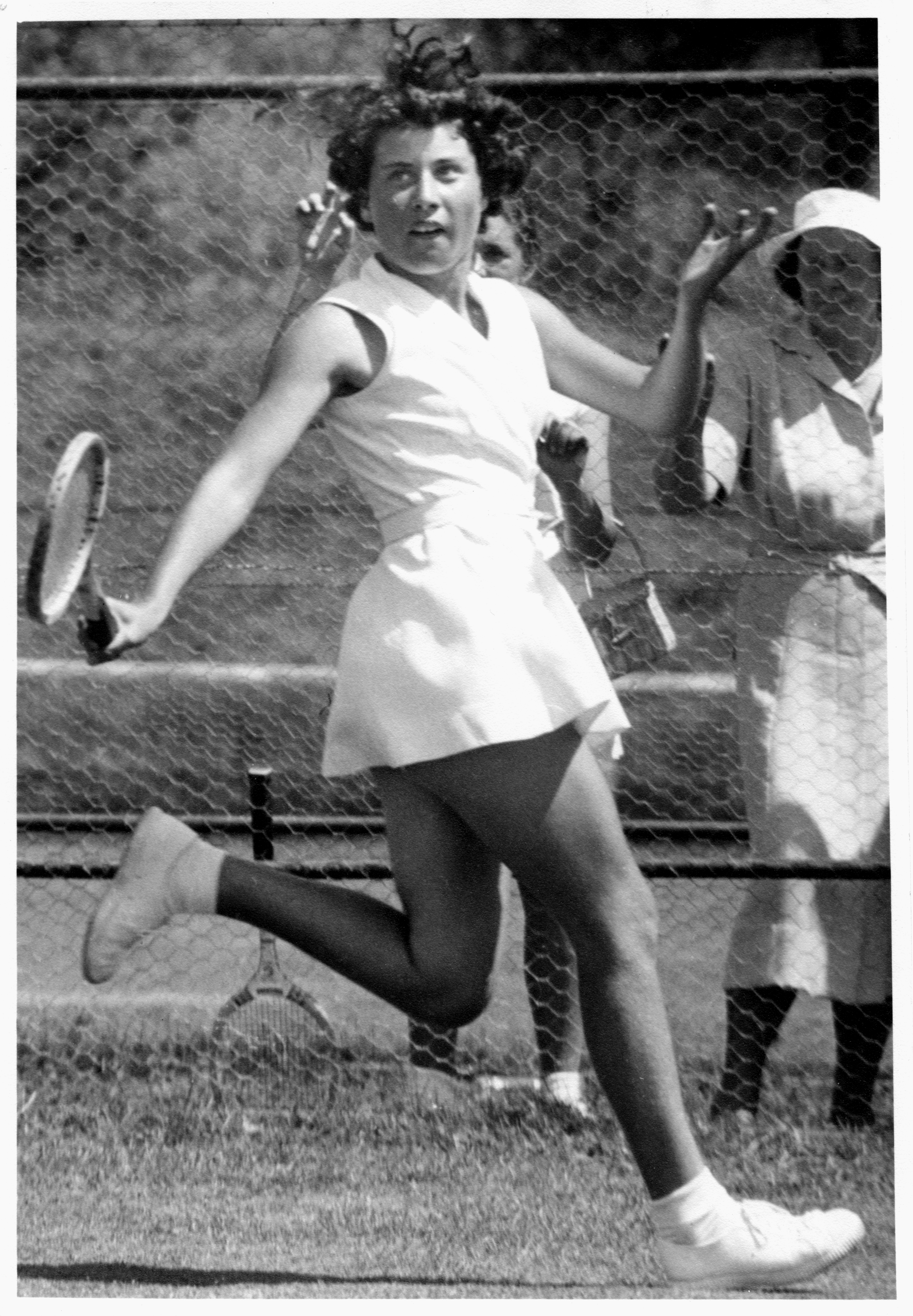
Eva Duldig at Kooyong, 1956

- Eva de Jong-Duldig, Wimbledon player, has been a member of the club for over half a century.

== See also ==
- List of tennis stadiums by capacity
- List of tennis venues

Events and tenants
Preceded by Merion Cricket Club, Haverford; Memorial Drive Park, Adelaide; Memorial Drive Park, Adelaide; White City Stadium, Sydney; White City Stadium, Sydney; Palais des Sports, Grenoble; Olympiahalle, Munich	Davis Cup; Final Venue; 1946; 1953; 1957; 1961; 1966; 1983; 1986	Succeeded by West Side Tennis Club, New York City; White City Stadium, Sydney; Milton Courts, Brisbane; Milton Courts, Brisbane; Milton Courts, Brisbane; Scandinavium, Gothenburg; Scandinavium, Gothenburg
Preceded by Germantown Cricket Club, Philadelphia; Devonshire Park, Eastbourne	Fed Cup; Venue; 1965; 1978	Succeeded by Turin Press Sporting Club, Turin; RSHE Club Campo, Madrid
Preceded by Boston Garden, Boston	Masters Cup; Venue; 1974	Succeeded by Kungliga tennishallen, Stockholm
