= Armando Vega (tennis) =

Mexican tennis player

- Full name: Armando Vega Iñiguez
- Country (sports): Mexico
- Born: 17 August 1923
- Plays: Right-handed

Singles

Grand Slam singles results
- US Open: 1R (1944)

Doubles

Grand Slam doubles results
- US Open: SF (1944)

Grand Slam mixed doubles results
- US Open: QF (1944)

Armando Vega Iñiguez (born 17 August 1923) was a Mexican tennis player.

Vega won Mexico's national singles championship as a 19 year old in 1942. He was a men's doubles semi-finalist with elder brother Rolando at the 1944 U.S. National Championships. From 1946 to 1951 he featured with his brother in the Mexico Davis Cup team, securing wins over Canada and Cuba. He twice pushed Australia's Frank Sedgman to five sets and beat his teammate Adrian Quist on one occasion. He was a civil engineer by profession.

== See also ==
- List of Mexico Davis Cup team representatives
