= 1952 Wimbledon Championships – Mixed doubles =

Mixed doubles
- 1952 Wimbledon Championships

Final
- Champions: (Australia) Frank Sedgman (United States) Doris Hart
- Runners-up: (Argentina) Enrique Morea (Australia) Thelma Long
- Score: 4–6, 6–3, 6–4

Details
- Draw: 80 (5Q)
- Seeds: 4

Events
Singles	men	women		boys	girls
Doubles	men	women	mixed	boys	girls
- Wimbledon Championships

Frank Sedgman and Doris Hart successfully defended their title, defeating Enrique Morea and Thelma Long in the final, 4–6, 6–3, 6–4 to win the mixed doubles tennis title at the 1952 Wimbledon Championships.

== Seeds ==
1. (Australia) Frank Sedgman / (United States) Doris Hart (champions)
2. (Australia) Ken McGregor / (United States) Louise Brough (semifinals)
3. (South Africa) Eric Sturgess / (United States) Shirley Fry (fourth round)
4. (Australia) Don Candy / (United States) Pat Todd (semifinals)

Click on the seed number of a player to go to their draw section.

== Draw ==
Key

- Q = Qualifier
- WC = Wild card
- LL = Lucky loser
- Alt = Alternate
- ITF = ITF entry
- PR = Protected ranking
- SR = Special ranking
- SE = Special exempt
- JE = Junior exempt
- JR = Junior Accelerator Programme entrant
- CO = College Accelerator Programme entrant
- NG = Next Gen Accelerator Program entrant
- w/o = Walkover
- r = Retired
- d = Defaulted

=== Finals ===
Quarterfinals
1	(Australia) Frank Sedgman (United States) Doris Hart	7	6
(United Kingdom) Gerry Oakley (United Kingdom) Pat Ward	5	2
4	(Australia) Don Candy (United States) Pat Todd	6	6
(South Africa) Owen Williams (United Kingdom) Mary Halford	0	1
(Australia) Lew Hoad (United States) Dorothy Head	6	3
(Argentina) Enrique Morea (Australia) Thelma Long	8	6
(Australia) Mervyn Rose (United States) Maureen Connolly	6	7	5
2	(Australia) Ken McGregor (United States) Louise Brough	2	9	7

Semifinals
1	(Australia) Frank Sedgman (United States) Doris Hart	6	6
4	(Australia) Don Candy (United States) Pat Todd	2	3
(Argentina) Enrique Morea (Australia) Thelma Long	6	7
2	(Australia) Ken McGregor (United States) Louise Brough	3	5

Final
1	(Australia) Frank Sedgman (United States) Doris Hart	4	6	6
(Argentina) Enrique Morea (Australia) Thelma Long	6	3	4

=== Top half ===
==== Section 1 ====
First round

Second round
1	(Australia) Frank Sedgman (United States) Doris Hart	6	6
(United Kingdom) Ron Statham (United Kingdom) Helen Fletcher	0	2
(Australia) Ian Ayre (United Kingdom) Jean Walker-Smith	6	6
(United Kingdom) Don Paton (United Kingdom) Rosemary Walsh	3	3
(India) S Vishnamohan (United Kingdom) Barbara Knapp	6	3	6
(Socialist Federal Republic of Yugoslavia) Milan Branović (United Kingdom) Pat Harrison	1	6	8
(New Zealand) Dennis Coombe (United Kingdom) Betty Wilford	4	4
(Belgium) Philippe Washer (United Kingdom) Susan Partridge	6	6

Third round
1	(Australia) F Sedgman (United States) D Hart	6	6
(Australia) I Ayre (United Kingdom) J Walker-Smith	2	3
(Socialist Federal Republic of Yugoslavia) M Branović (United Kingdom) P Harrison	3	3
(Belgium) P Washer (United Kingdom) S Partridge	6	6

Fourth round
1	(Australia) F Sedgman (United States) D Hart	6	6
(Belgium) P Washer (United Kingdom) S Partridge	2	1

==== Section 2 ====
First round

Second round
(Finland) Sakari Salo (Finland) Thelma Salo	7	6
(Belgium) Jacques Peten (Belgium) Janine de Ridder	5	2
(United Kingdom) Headley Baxter (United Kingdom) Peggy Dawson-Scott	7	6
(United Kingdom) Cliff Hovell (United Kingdom) Pat Lewis	5	2
(United Kingdom) Don Butler (United Kingdom) Rosemary Bulleid
(United Kingdom) Tony Mottram (United Kingdom) Joy Mottram	w/o
(United Kingdom) Roland Carter (United Kingdom) Molly Blair	5	3
(United Kingdom) Gerry Oakley (United Kingdom) Pat Ward	7	6

Third round
(Finland) S Salo (Finland) T Salo	6	2
(United Kingdom) H Baxter (United Kingdom) P Dawson-Scott	8	6
(United Kingdom) D Butler (United Kingdom) R Bulleid	5	3
(United Kingdom) G Oakley (United Kingdom) P Ward	7	6

Fourth round
(United Kingdom) H Baxter (United Kingdom) P Dawson-Scott	3	4
(United Kingdom) G Oakley (United Kingdom) P Ward	6	6

==== Section 3 ====
First round

Second round
4	(Australia) Don Candy (United States) Pat Todd	6	6
(Australia) Harry Hopman (Australia) Nell Hopman	1	0
(South Africa) Leon Norgarb (South Africa) Hazel Redick-Smith	6	7
(United States) Gene Garrett (Switzerland) Violette Rigollet	3	5
(Switzerland) Henri Paul Brechbuhl (West Germany) Inge Pohmann	2	11
(Australia) Peter Cawthorn (United Kingdom) Lorna Cornell	6	13
Q	(United Kingdom) Dennis Brown (United Kingdom) Lorna White	7	6
(Kenya) Rusty Mayers (United Kingdom) Janet Morgan	5	3

Third round
4	(Australia) D Candy (United States) P Todd	6	6
(South Africa) L Norgarb (South Africa) H Redick-Smith	3	0
(Australia) P Cawthorn (United Kingdom) L Cornell	8	6
Q	(United Kingdom) D Brown (United Kingdom) L White	6	0

Fourth round
4	(Australia) D Candy (United States) P Todd	6	6
(Australia) P Cawthorn (United Kingdom) L Cornell	1	2

==== Section 4 ====
First round
(South Africa) Owen Williams (United Kingdom) Mary Halford	6	8
(Italy) Vivian Gotto (Republic of Ireland) Roguie Bain	2	6
(France) Jean-Claude Molinari (France) Nelly Adamson	6	6
(United Kingdom) Henry Billington (United Kingdom) Susan Billington	2	4
(Netherlands) Hans van Dalsum (Netherlands) Nel Hermsen	6	13	4
(Republic of Ireland) George McVeagh (United Kingdom) Patsy O'Connell	1	15	6
(South Africa) Bryan Woodroffe (South Africa) Gwendolyn Love	6	2	6
(South Africa) Nigel Cockburn (South Africa) Beryl Bartlett	1	6	3
(United Kingdom) Colin Hannam (United Kingdom) Anne Shilcock	2	6	3
(United States) Grant Golden (United Kingdom) Mary Eyre	6	2	6
Q	(United Kingdom) Roy Wilson (United Kingdom) Bobbie Wilson	3	4
(India) Narendra Nath (United States) Gloria Butler	6	6
(United Kingdom) Tommy Anderson (United Kingdom) Viola White	4	2
(Chile) Ricardo Balbiers (United Kingdom) Jean Trower	6	6
(United States) Dick Sorlien (United States) Baba Lewis	3	6	6
(Dominion of Ceylon) Doug Scharenguivel (United Kingdom) Sheila Speight	6	3	4

Second round
(South Africa) O Williams (United Kingdom) M Halford	6	3	6
(France) J-C Molinari (France) N Adamson	4	6	3
(Republic of Ireland) George McVeagh (United Kingdom) P O'Connell	0	1
(South Africa) B Woodroffe (South Africa) G Love	6	6
(United States) G Golden (United Kingdom) M Eyre	4	6	3
(India) N Nath (United States) G Butler	6	3	6
(Chile) R Balbiers (United Kingdom) J Trower	3	6	6
(United States) R Sorlien (United States) B Lewis	6	2	3

Third round
(South Africa) O Williams (United Kingdom) M Halford	6	7
(South Africa) B Woodroffe (South Africa) G Love	4	5
(India) N Nath (United States) G Butler	6	2	6
(Chile) R Balbiers (United Kingdom) J Trower	2	6	2

Fourth round
(South Africa) O Williams (United Kingdom) M Halford	6	6
(India) N Nath (United States) G Butler	2	3

=== Bottom half ===
==== Section 5 ====
First round
(Poland) Władysław Skonecki (Egypt) Betsy Abbas	6	6
(India) MUG Apparao (United Kingdom) Audrey Houseley	2	0
(Australia) Ken Rosewall (Australia) Beryl Penrose	6	6
(United Kingdom) Bill Threlfall (United Kingdom) Jean Petchell	0	2
(Belgium) Pierre Geelhand de Merxem (Argentina) Elena Lehmann	6	4	4
(Southern Rhodesia) Basil Katz (United Kingdom) Gladys Lines	4	6	6
(United States) Gardnar Mulloy (India) Mrs M Hasler	w/o
(United Kingdom) John Horn (United Kingdom) Elaine Watson
(France) Jean Borotra (United States) Arvilla McGuire	2	4
(Poland) Czesław Spychała (United Kingdom) Bea Walter	6	6
(Australia) Lew Hoad (United States) Dorothy Head
(United Kingdom) Claude Lister (United Kingdom) Thelma Lister	w/o
(Belgium) Jacques Brichant (Belgium) Christiane Mercelis	6	6
(Uruguay) Eduardo Argon (United Kingdom) Molly Stone	3	4
(Republic of Ireland) Joe Hackett (United Kingdom) Billie Woodgate	6	3	6
(Sweden) Staffan Stockenberg (United Kingdom) Nancy Liebert	2	6	1

Second round
(Poland) W Skonecki (Egypt) B Abbas	2	8	6
(Australia) K Rosewall (Australia) B Penrose	6	6	4
(Southern Rhodesia) B Katz (United Kingdom) G Lines	6	3	4
(United Kingdom) J Horn (United Kingdom) E Watson	3	6	6
(Poland) C Spychała (United Kingdom) B Walter	4	4
(Australia) L Hoad (United States) D Head	6	6
(Belgium) J Brichant (Belgium) C Mercelis	6	6
(Republic of Ireland) J Hackett (United Kingdom) R Woodgate	4	4

Third round
(Poland) W Skonecki (Egypt) B Abbas	6	6
(United Kingdom) J Horn (United Kingdom) E Watson	4	0
(Australia) L Hoad (United States) D Head	8	6
(Belgium) J Brichant (Belgium) C Mercelis	6	4

Fourth round
(Poland) W Skonecki (Egypt) B Abbas	1	6	3
(Australia) L Hoad (United States) D Head	6	1	6

==== Section 6 ====
First round

Second round
(Republic of Ireland) Guy Jackson (Republic of Ireland) Betty Lombard	4	2
(Argentina) Enrique Morea (Australia) Thelma Long	6	6
Q	(United Kingdom) Bob Lee (United Kingdom) Norma Seacy	4	7	2
(Australia) Don Tregonning (United Kingdom) Gem Hoahing	6	5	6
Q	(United Kingdom) Leslie Cater (United Kingdom) Leonie Brighton	5	5
(Czechoslovakia) Milan Matouš (Czechoslovakia) Helena Matouš	7	7
(Australia) Phil Brophy (Austria) Helga Strecker	2	2
3	(South Africa) Eric Sturgess (United States) Shirley Fry	6	6

Third round
(Argentina) E Morea (Australia) T Long	6	6
(Australia) D Tregonning (United Kingdom) C Hoahing	1	2
(Czechoslovakia) M Matouš (Czechoslovakia) H Matouš	0	5
3	(South Africa) E Sturgess (United States) S Fry	6	7

Fourth round
(Argentina) E Morea (Australia) T Long	6	3	6
3	(South Africa) E Sturgess (United States) S Fry	0	6	4

==== Section 7 ====
First round

Second round
(Argentina) Alejo Russell (Argentina) Mary Terán de Weiss	w/o
(United States) Ham Richardson (United Kingdom) Elsie Phillips
(South Africa) Trevor Fancutt (United Kingdom) Doreen Spiers	9	3	6
(United Kingdom) Roger Becker (United Kingdom) Vera Thomas	7	6	3
Q	(United Kingdom) Warwick Shute (United Kingdom) Denise Collier	6	6
(United Kingdom) Harold Marsland (United Kingdom) Evelyn Moeller	1	3
(Australia) Mervyn Rose (United States) Maureen Connolly	6	6
(Spain) Jaime Bartrolí (South Africa) Doreen Wedderburn	1	1

Third round
(United States) H Richardson (United Kingdom) E Phillips	w/o
(South Africa) T Fancutt (United Kingdom) D Spiers
Q	(United Kingdom) W Shute (United Kingdom) D Collier	4	2
(Australia) M Rose (United States) M Connolly	6	6

Fourth round
(South Africa) T Fancutt (United Kingdom) D Spiers	1	2
(Australia) M Rose (United States) M Connolly	6	6

==== Section 8 ====
First round

Second round
(Netherlands) Fred Dehnert (Netherlands) Joopy Roos-Van der Wal	6	8	7
(Italy) Vanni Canepele (United Kingdom) Freda Hammersley	2	10	9
(Colombia) O Rodriguez (United Kingdom) Helen Proudfoot	1	3
(Austria) Freddie Huber (Austria) Elizabeth Broz	6	6
(South Africa) Derek Capell (South Africa) Julia Wipplinger	2	7
(United Kingdom) Geoffrey Paish (United Kingdom) Jean Rinkel-Quertier	6	9
(Poland) Ignacy Tłoczyński (United Kingdom) Georgie Woodgate	1	0
2	(Australia) Ken McGregor (United States) Louise Brough	6	6

Third round
(Italy) G Canepele (United Kingdom) W Hammersley	2	5
(Austria) A Huber (Austria) E Broz	6	7
(United Kingdom) G Paish (United Kingdom) J Rinkel-Quertier	7	2
2	(Australia) K McGregor (United States) L Brough	9	6

Fourth round
(Austria) A Huber (Austria) E Broz	4	4
2	(Australia) K McGregor (United States) L Brough	6	6
