= 1951 Wimbledon Championships – Women's singles =

Women's singles
- 1951 Wimbledon Championships

Final
- Champion: (United States) Doris Hart
- Runner-up: (United States) Shirley Fry
- Score: 6–1, 6–0

Details
- Draw: 96 (10 Q )
- Seeds: 8

Events
Singles	men	women		boys	girls
Doubles	men	women	mixed	boys	girls
← 1950 ·	Wimbledon Championships	· 1952 →

Doris Hart defeated Shirley Fry in the final, 6–1, 6–0 to win the ladies' singles tennis title at the 1951 Wimbledon Championships. Louise Brough was the defending champion, but lost in the semifinals to Fry.

== Seeds ==
1. (United States) Louise Brough (semifinals)
2. (United States) Margaret duPont (quarterfinals)
3. (United States) Doris Hart (champion)
4. (United States) Shirley Fry (final)
5. (United States) Beverly Baker (semifinals)
6. (United States) Pat Todd (withdrew)
7. (United States) Nancy Chaffee (quarterfinals)
8. (United Kingdom) Jean Walker-Smith (quarterfinals)

Click on the seed number of a player to go to their draw section.

Pat Todd withdrew before the tournament began. She was replaced in the draw by lucky loser Madzy Couquerque.

== Draw ==
=== Key ===
- Q = Qualifier
- WC = Wild card
- LL = Lucky loser
- Alt = Alternate
- SE = Special exempt
- PR = Protected ranking
- ITF = ITF entry
- JE = Junior exempt
- w/o = Walkover
- r = Retired
- d = Defaulted
- SR = Special ranking

=== Finals ===
Quarterfinals
2	(United States) Margaret duPont	1	6	3
5	(United States) Beverly Baker	6	4	6
3	(United States) Doris Hart	6	6
7	(United States) Nancy Chaffee	3	3
8	(United Kingdom) Jean Walker-Smith	6	4
4	(United States) Shirley Fry	8	6
(United Kingdom) Kay Tuckey	7	1	3
1	(United States) Louise Brough	5	6	6

Semifinals
5	(United States) Beverly Baker	3	1
3	(United States) Doris Hart	6	6
4	(United States) Shirley Fry	6	6
1	(United States) Louise Brough	4	2

Final
3	(United States) Doris Hart	6	6
4	(United States) Shirley Fry	1	0

=== Top half ===
==== Section 1 ====
First round

Second round
2	(United States) Margaret duPont	6	6
(United Kingdom) Joy Mottram	3	4
(Hungary) Zsuzsa Körmöczy	6	6
(Australia) Beryl Penrose	4	0
(United Kingdom) Sheila Speight	6	5
(United Kingdom) Enid Andrews	8	7
(Austria) Helga Strecker	w/o
(United Kingdom) Peggy Dawson-Scott

Third round
2	(United States) M duPont	6	6
(Hungary) Z Körmöczy	1	1
(United Kingdom) E Andrews	7	1	3
(United Kingdom) P Dawson-Scott	5	6	6

Fourth round
2	(United States) M duPont	7	6
(United Kingdom) P Dawson-Scott	5	2

==== Section 2 ====
First round

Second round
5	(United States) Beverly Baker	6	6
Q	(United Kingdom) Laura Morgan	2	0
(United States) Althea Gibson	6	2	6
(United Kingdom) Pat Ward	0	6	4
(Kenya) Sheila Dowdeswell	4	3
(Italy) Nicla Migliori	6	6
(Austria) Elizabeth Broz	3	3
(Czechoslovakia) Helena Matouš	6	6

Third round
5	(United States) B Baker	6	6
(United States) A Gibson	1	3
(Italy) N Migliori	6	4
(Czechoslovakia) H Matouš	8	6

Fourth round
5	(United States) B Baker	10	6
(Czechoslovakia) H Matouš	8	3

==== Section 3 ====
First round
3	(United States) Doris Hart	6	6
(France) Jacqueline Marcellin	2	0
(Argentina) Mary Terán de Weiss	8	6
(United Kingdom) Margot Parker	6	1
(Australia) Nancye Bolton	6	6
(United Kingdom) Molly Blair	1	2
(United Kingdom) Joan Curry	6	6
(United Kingdom) Evelyn Moeller	2	1
(United Kingdom) Beryl Parker	2	5
Q	(United Kingdom) Pat Harrison	6	7
(United Kingdom) Betty Wilford	2	1
(United Kingdom) Margot Gordon	6	6
(United Kingdom) Rosemary Bulleid	6	7
(United Kingdom) Joy Hibbert	4	5
(United Kingdom) Jean Quertier	6	6
(Norway) Ruth Haukenes	1	3

Second round
3	(United States) D Hart	6	7
(Argentina) M Terán de Weiss	0	5
(Australia) N Bolton	6	6
(United Kingdom) J Curry	1	1
Q	(United Kingdom) P Harrison	5	3
(United Kingdom) M Gordon	7	6
(United Kingdom) R Bulleid	3	3
(United Kingdom) J Quertier	6	6

Third round
3	(United States) D Hart	6	7
(Australia) N Bolton	4	5
(United Kingdom) M Gordon	4	1
(United Kingdom) J Quertier	6	6

Fourth round
3	(United States) D Hart	6	6
(United Kingdom) J Quertier	4	3

==== Section 4 ====
First round
7	(United States) Nancy Chaffee	4	6	6
(United Kingdom) Joey Lloyd	6	2	3
Q	(New Zealand) Evelyn Attwood	6	3	6
LL	(United Kingdom) Marguerite White	3	6	2
(United Kingdom) Vera Thomas	2	10
(United States) Arvilla McGuire	6	12
(South Africa) Beryl Bartlett	6	6
(United Kingdom) Pat Gotla	3	2
(United Kingdom) Audrey Bates	6	4	4
(United Kingdom) Rosemary Walsh	2	6	6
(Belgium) Christiane Mercelis	3	4
(United Kingdom) Mary Halford	6	6
(United Kingdom) Helen Fletcher	6	6
(United Kingdom) Margaret Emerson	4	3
(United Kingdom) Janet Morgan	6	0	4
(Sweden) Birgit Gullbrandsson-Sandén	3	6	6

Second round
7	(United States) N Chaffee	6	6
Q	(New Zealand) E Attwood	1	0
(United States) A McGuire	6	3	6
(South Africa) B Bartlett	3	6	4
(United Kingdom) R Walsh	8	2	0
(United Kingdom) M Halford	6	6	6
(United Kingdom) H Fletcher	1	1
(Sweden) B Gullbrandsson-Sandén	6	6

Third round
7	(United States) N Chaffee	6	6
(United States) A McGuire	3	3
(United Kingdom) M Halford	2	1
(Sweden) B Gullbrandsson-Sandén	6	6

Fourth round
7	(United States) N Chaffee	6	6
(Sweden) B Gullbrandsson-Sandén	0	3

=== Bottom half ===
==== Section 5 ====
First round
(Netherlands) Mrs MA Schmier	3	1
(United Kingdom) Billie Woodgate	6	6
Q	(United Kingdom) Gladys Lines	1	4
(United States) Rita Anderson	6	6
(United Kingdom) Leonie Brighton	6	3	2
(United Kingdom) Wendy Stork	4	6	6
(United Kingdom) Noelle Knight	4	4
(United Kingdom) Nancy Liebert	6	6
LL	(United Kingdom) Elsie Phillips	2	2
(United Kingdom) Pam Bocquet	6	6
(United Kingdom) Jean Trower	6	4	3
(United Kingdom) Freda Hammersley	4	6	6
(Switzerland) Violette Rigollet	6	6
Q	(United Kingdom) Joan Ross-Dilley	4	3
(United Kingdom) Georgie Woodgate	0	4
8	(United Kingdom) Jean Walker-Smith	6	6

Second round
(United Kingdom) R Woodgate	5	3
(United States) R Anderson	7	6
(United Kingdom) W Stork	6	6
(United Kingdom) N Liebert	0	2
(United Kingdom) P Bocquet	6	4	6
(United Kingdom) W Hammersley	3	6	2
(Switzerland) V Rigollet	2	4
8	(United Kingdom) J Walker-Smith	6	6

Third round
(United States) R Anderson	6	8
(United Kingdom) W Stork	2	6
(United Kingdom) P Bocquet	3	4
8	(United Kingdom) J Walker-Smith	6	6

Fourth round
(United States) R Anderson	4	1
8	(United Kingdom) J Walker-Smith	6	6

==== Section 6 ====
First round
(United Kingdom) Katie Johns	2	6	6
(United Kingdom) Barbara Knapp	6	4	3
(United Kingdom) Lorna Cornell	6	6
(United Kingdom) Margaret Knott	2	2
(United Kingdom) Thelma Lister	3	6	6
Q	(United Kingdom) Gem Gilbert	6	4	1
(United Kingdom) Alex McKelvie	3	1
(Australia) Clare Proctor	6	6
(Republic of Ireland) Maeve Downey	7	6
Q	(United Kingdom) Frances Walthew	5	3
Q	(France) Suzanne Schmitt
(Australia) Thelma Long	w/o
LL	(United Kingdom) Joyce Starling	1	2
(United States) Betty Rosenquest	6	6
(United Kingdom) Susan Partridge	3	1
4	(United States) Shirley Fry	6	6

Second round
(United Kingdom) K Johns	2	6	0
(United Kingdom) L Cornell	6	2	6
(United Kingdom) T Lister	3	5
(Australia) C Proctor	6	7
(Republic of Ireland) M Downey	6	2	0
Q	(France) S Schmitt	2	6	6
(United States) E Rosenquest	3	5
4	(United States) S Fry	6	7

Third round
(United Kingdom) L Cornell	6	6
(Australia) C Proctor	4	4
Q	(France) S Schmitt	1	0
4	(United States) S Fry	6	6

Fourth round
(United Kingdom) L Cornell	0	1
4	(United States) S Fry	6	6

==== Section 7 ====
First round

Second round
(Netherlands) Nel Hermsen	6	6
(United Kingdom) Angela Mortimer	3	2
(United States) Barbara Davidson	7	6
(United Kingdom) Margaret Carlisle	5	1
(United Kingdom) Edie Luxton	4	3
(United Kingdom) Gay Chandler	6	6
(United Kingdom) Kay Tuckey	6	6
LL	(Netherlands) Madzy Couquerque	3	2

Third round
(Netherlands) N Hermsen	1	2
(United States) B Davidson	6	6
(United Kingdom) G Chandler	2	3
(United Kingdom) K Tuckey	6	6

Fourth round
(United States) B Davidson	2	6	1
(United Kingdom) K Tuckey	6	3	6

==== Section 8 ====
First round

Second round
(United Kingdom) Jenny Wagstaff	6	3	6
(United Kingdom) Betty Coutts	2	6	2
(United Kingdom) Effie Peters	0	7
Q	(United Kingdom) Pat Lewis	6	9
(United Kingdom) Viola White	2	2
(United Kingdom) Gem Hoahing	6	6
Q	(United Kingdom) Gwen Scott	1	2
1	(United States) Louise Brough	6	6

Third round
(United Kingdom) J Wagstaff	2	2
Q	(United Kingdom) P Lewis	6	6
(United Kingdom) G Hoahing	1	3
1	(United States) L Brough	6	6

Fourth round
Q	(United Kingdom) P Lewis	1	0
1	(United States) L Brough	6	6

Preceded by 1951 French Championships – Women's singles	Grand Slam women's singles	Succeeded by 1951 U.S. National Championships – Women's singles
