= 1952 Wimbledon Championships – Women's doubles =

Women's doubles
- 1952 Wimbledon Championships

Final
- Champions: (United States) Shirley Fry (United States) Doris Hart
- Runners-up: (United States) Louise Brough (United States) Maureen Connolly
- Score: 8–6, 6–3

Details
- Draw: 48 (5 Q )
- Seeds: 4

Events
Singles	men	women		boys	girls
Doubles	men	women	mixed	boys	girls
← 1951 ·	Wimbledon Championships	· 1953 →

Shirley Fry and Doris Hart successfully defended their title, defeating Louise Brough and Maureen Connolly in the final, 8–6, 6–3 to win the ladies' doubles tennis title at the 1952 Wimbledon Championships.

== Seeds ==
1. (United States) Shirley Fry / (United States) Doris Hart (champions)
2. (United States) Louise Brough / (United States) Maureen Connolly (final)
3. (Australia) Thelma Long / (United States) Pat Todd (semifinals)
4. (United Kingdom) Susan Partridge / (United Kingdom) Jean Rinkel-Quertier (semifinals)

Click on the seed number of a player to go to their draw section.

== Draw ==
=== Key ===
- Q = Qualifier
- WC = Wild card
- LL = Lucky loser
- Alt = Alternate
- SE = Special exempt
- PR = Protected ranking
- ITF = ITF entry
- JE = Junior exempt
- w/o = Walkover
- r = Retired
- d = Defaulted
- SR = Special ranking

=== Finals ===
Quarterfinals
2	(United States) Louise Brough (United States) Maureen Connolly	6	6
(United Kingdom) Mary Eyre (United Kingdom) Viola White	1	3
3	(Australia) Thelma Long (United States) Pat Todd	6	8
(United Kingdom) Molly Blair (United Kingdom) Mary Halford	2	6
(United Kingdom) Helen Fletcher (United Kingdom) Jean Walker-Smith	5	6	3
4	(United Kingdom) Susan Partridge (United Kingdom) Jean Rinkel-Quertier	7	4	6
(United Kingdom) Rosemary Bulleid (United Kingdom) Angela Mortimer	3	1
1	(United States) Shirley Fry (United States) Doris Hart	6	6

Semifinals
2	(United States) Louise Brough (United States) Maureen Connolly	5	6	6
3	(Australia) Thelma Long (United States) Pat Todd	7	1	4
4	(United Kingdom) Susan Partridge (United Kingdom) Jean Rinkel-Quertier	5	3
1	(United States) Shirley Fry (United States) Doris Hart	7	6

Final
2	(United States) Louise Brough (United States) Maureen Connolly	6	3
1	(United States) Shirley Fry (United States) Doris Hart	8	6

=== Top half ===
==== Section 1 ====
First round

Second round
2	(United States) Louise Brough (United States) Maureen Connolly
(United Kingdom) Joy Mottram (United Kingdom) Pat Ward	w/o
(United Kingdom) Elsie Phillips (United Kingdom) Molly Stone
(United States) Rita Anderson (United Kingdom) Joan Curry	w/o
(United Kingdom) Mary Eyre (United Kingdom) Viola White	6	7
(United Kingdom) Audrey Bates (United Kingdom) Ada Ernest	1	5
Q	(United Kingdom) Joyce Coles (United Kingdom) Mary Wavish	8	2
(France) Michelle Bourbonnais (France) Annie Passet	10	6

Third round
2	(United States) L Brough (United States) M Connolly	6	6
(United Kingdom) E Phillips (United Kingdom) M Stone	2	1
(United Kingdom) M Eyre (United Kingdom) V White	6	6
(France) M Bourbonnais (France) A Passet	2	0

Quarterfinals
2	(United States) L Brough (United States) M Connolly	6	6
(United Kingdom) M Eyre (United Kingdom) V White	1	3

==== Section 2 ====
First round
3	(Australia) Thelma Long (United States) Pat Todd	6	6
(United Kingdom) Nancy Glover (United Kingdom) Freda Hammersley	0	0
(United States) Gloria Butler (Czechoslovakia) Helena Matouš	4	7	1
Q	(United Kingdom) BM Goodman (United Kingdom) Margaret Knott	6	5	6
(United Kingdom) Susan Billington (United Kingdom) Margot Parker	6	2
(South Africa) Beryl Bartlett (South Africa) Hazel Redick-Smith	8	6
(United Kingdom) Pat Gotla (United Kingdom) Barbara Knapp	6	1	6
(United Kingdom) Patsy Rodgers (South Africa) Doreen Wedderburn	0	6	3
Q	(United Kingdom) Joan MacLeod (United Kingdom) Edna Mercer	4	4
(United Kingdom) Valerie Gardner (United Kingdom) Janet Morgan	6	6
(United Kingdom) Sheila Speight (United Kingdom) Rosemary Walsh	6	2	4
Q	(Egypt) Betsy Abbas (United Kingdom) Doreen Spiers	4	6	6
(France) Jacqueline Kermina (Switzerland) Violette Rigollet	6	4	3
Q	(United Kingdom) Margaret Grace (United Kingdom) Judy Wallace	4	6	6
(United Kingdom) Molly Blair (United Kingdom) Mary Halford	6	6
(United Kingdom) Pat Lewis (United Kingdom) Elaine Watson	2	2

Second round
3	(Australia) T Long (United States) P Todd	6	6
(United Kingdom) BM Goodman (United Kingdom) M Knott	0	3
(South Africa) B Bartlett (South Africa) H Redick-Smith	6	6
(United Kingdom) P Gotla (United Kingdom) B Knapp	4	2
(United Kingdom) V Gardner (United Kingdom) J Morgan	1^{r}
Q	(Egypt) B Abbas (United Kingdom) D Spiers	3
Q	(United Kingdom) M Grace (United Kingdom) J Wallace	4	2
(United Kingdom) M Blair (United Kingdom) M Halford	6	6

Third round
3	(Australia) T Long (United States) P Todd	4	6	6
(South Africa) B Bartlett (South Africa) H Redick-Smith	6	2	4
Q	(Egypt) B Abbas (United Kingdom) D Spiers	5	3
(United Kingdom) M Blair (United Kingdom) M Halford	7	6

Quarterfinals
3	(Australia) T Long (United States) P Todd	6	8
(United Kingdom) M Blair (United Kingdom) M Halford	2	6

=== Bottom half ===
==== Section 3 ====
First round
(Netherlands) Nel Hermsen (Netherlands) Joopy Roos-Van der Wal	7	5
(United Kingdom) Gem Hoahing (United Kingdom) Georgie Woodgate	9	7
(United Kingdom) Louise Dick (United Kingdom) Heather Macfarlane	3	4
(United Kingdom) Vera Thomas (United Kingdom) Billie Woodgate	6	6
(Austria) Elizabeth Broz (Austria) Helga Strecker	3	1
(United Kingdom) Helen Fletcher (United Kingdom) Jean Walker-Smith	6	6
(South Africa) Gwendolyn Love (Australia) Beryl Penrose	6	6
(United Kingdom) Margaret Carlisle (United Kingdom) Lorna White	1	2
(United Kingdom) Effie Peters (United Kingdom) Bea Walter	3	1
(United Kingdom) Anne Shilcock (South Africa) Julia Wipplinger	6	6
(United Kingdom) Molly Mackay (United Kingdom) Helen Proudfoot	1	6	6
(United Kingdom) Peggy Knight (United Kingdom) Enid Sutton	6	4	4
(Republic of Ireland) Roguie Bain (Republic of Ireland) Betty Lombard	10	6
(United Kingdom) Margaret Lewis (United Kingdom) Gwen Scott	8	3
(United Kingdom) Peggy Dawson-Scott (United Kingdom) Betty Wilford	2	6	3
4	(United Kingdom) Susan Partridge (United Kingdom) Jean Rinkel-Quertier	6	3	6

Second round
(United Kingdom) C Hoahing (United Kingdom) G Woodgate	6	6
(United Kingdom) V Thomas (United Kingdom) R Woodgate	2	2
(United Kingdom) H Fletcher (United Kingdom) J Walker-Smith	7	4	6
(South Africa) G Love (Australia) B Penrose	5	6	3
(United Kingdom) A Shilcock (South Africa) J Wipplinger	6	6	5
(United Kingdom) M Mackay (United Kingdom) H Proudfoot	2	8	7
(Republic of Ireland) R Bain (Republic of Ireland) E Lombard	3	0
4	(United Kingdom) S Partridge (United Kingdom) J Rinkel-Quertier	6	6

Third round
(United Kingdom) C Hoahing (United Kingdom) G Woodgate	0	3
(United Kingdom) H Fletcher (United Kingdom) J Walker-Smith	6	6
(United Kingdom) M Mackay (United Kingdom) H Proudfoot	1	2
4	(United Kingdom) S Partridge (United Kingdom) J Rinkel-Quertier	6	6

Quarterfinals
(United Kingdom) H Fletcher (United Kingdom) J Walker-Smith	5	6	3
4	(United Kingdom) S Partridge (United Kingdom) J Rinkel-Quertier	7	4	6

==== Section 4 ====
First round

Second round
(United States) Dorothy Head (United States) Arvilla McGuire	6	6
(United Kingdom) Lorna Byrne (United Kingdom) Pearl Panton	1	1
(United Kingdom) Rosemary Bulleid (United Kingdom) Angela Mortimer
(United Kingdom) Gay Chandler (United Kingdom) Thelma Lister	w/o
(France) Nelly Adamson (Argentina) Mary Terán de Weiss	w/o
(Australia) Nell Hopman (United States) Baba Lewis
(United Kingdom) Pat Harrison (United Kingdom) Jean Trower	2	0
1	(United States) Shirley Fry (United States) Doris Hart	6	6

Third round
(United States) D Head (United States) A McGuire	4	5
(United Kingdom) R Bulleid (United Kingdom) A Mortimer	6	7
(Australia) E Hopman (United States) B Lewis	0	2
1	(United States) S Fry (United States) D Hart	6	6

Quarterfinals
(United Kingdom) R Bulleid (United Kingdom) A Mortimer	3	1
1	(United States) S Fry (United States) D Hart	6	6
