= 1951 Wimbledon Championships – Women's doubles =

Women's doubles
- 1951 Wimbledon Championships

Final
- Champions: (United States) Shirley Fry (United States) Doris Hart
- Runners-up: (United States) Louise Brough (United States) Margaret duPont
- Score: 6–3, 13–11

Details
- Draw: 48 (5 Q )
- Seeds: 4

Events
Singles	men	women		boys	girls
Doubles	men	women	mixed	boys	girls
← 1950 ·	Wimbledon Championships	· 1952 →

Shirley Fry and Doris Hart defeated the defending champions Louise Brough and Margaret duPont in the final, 6–3, 13–11 to win the ladies' doubles tennis title at the 1951 Wimbledon Championships.

== Seeds ==
1. (United States) Louise Brough / (United States) Margaret duPont (final)
2. (United States) Shirley Fry / (United States) Doris Hart (champions)
3. (United States) Barbara Davidson / (United States) Betty Rosenquest (semifinals)
4. (United States) Beverly Baker / (United States) Nancy Chaffee (semifinals)

Click on the seed number of a player to go to their draw section.

== Draw ==
=== Key ===
- Q = Qualifier
- WC = Wild card
- LL = Lucky loser
- Alt = Alternate
- SE = Special exempt
- PR = Protected ranking
- ITF = ITF entry
- JE = Junior exempt
- w/o = Walkover
- r = Retired
- d = Defaulted
- SR = Special ranking

=== Finals ===
Quarterfinals
1	(United States) Louise Brough (United States) Margaret duPont	6	6
(United Kingdom) Joy Mottram (United Kingdom) Jean Walker-Smith	1	4
3	(United States) Barbara Davidson (United States) Betty Rosenquest	8	6
(United Kingdom) Peggy Dawson-Scott (United Kingdom) Betty Wilford	6	1
(United Kingdom) Mary Eyre (United Kingdom) Viola White	2	4
4	(United States) Beverly Baker (United States) Nancy Chaffee	6	6
(United Kingdom) Jean Quertier (United Kingdom) Kay Tuckey	3	1
2	(United States) Shirley Fry (United States) Doris Hart	6	6

Semifinals
1	(United States) Louise Brough (United States) Margaret duPont	6	6
3	(United States) Barbara Davidson (United States) Betty Rosenquest	1	3
4	(United States) Beverly Baker (United States) Nancy Chaffee	0	2
2	(United States) Shirley Fry (United States) Doris Hart	6	6

Final
1	(United States) Louise Brough (United States) Margaret duPont	3	11
2	(United States) Shirley Fry (United States) Doris Hart	6	13

=== Top half ===
==== Section 1 ====
First round

Second round
1	(United States) Louise Brough (United States) Margaret duPont	6	6
(United Kingdom) Molly Blair (United Kingdom) Jean Trower	1	3
(Sweden) Birgit Gullbrandsson-Sandén (Austria) Helga Strecker	w/o
(United Kingdom) Molly Mackay (United Kingdom) Helen Proudfoot
(United Kingdom) Susan Billington (United Kingdom) Margot Parker
(France) Nelly Adamson (United States) Althea Gibson	w/o
(France) Jacqueline Marcellin (France) Suzanne Schmitt	3	0
(United Kingdom) Joy Mottram (United Kingdom) Jean Walker-Smith	6	6

Third round
1	(United States) L Brough (United States) M duPont	6	6
(United Kingdom) M Mackay (United Kingdom) H Proudfoot	1	2
(United Kingdom) S Billington (United Kingdom) M Parker	5	5
(United Kingdom) J Mottram (United Kingdom) J Walker-Smith	7	7

Quarterfinals
1	(United States) L Brough (United States) M duPont	6	6
(United Kingdom) J Mottram (United Kingdom) J Walker-Smith	1	4

==== Section 2 ====
First round
3	(United States) Barbara Davidson (United States) Betty Rosenquest	6	6
(United Kingdom) Valerie Gardner (United Kingdom) Janet Morgan	2	4
(Australia) Nancye Bolton (Australia) Thelma Long	w/o
(United Kingdom) Pat Gotla (United Kingdom) Barbara Knapp
(United Kingdom) Bea Walter (United Kingdom) Georgie Woodgate	7	7
(United States) Gloria Butler (Czechoslovakia) Helena Matouš	5	5
(United Kingdom) Margot Gordon (United Kingdom) Mary Halford	6	6
(United Kingdom) Pat Harrison (United Kingdom) Anne Layfield	2	3
(United Kingdom) BM Goodman (United Kingdom) Rosemary Walsh	6	3
(United Kingdom) Margaret Carlisle (United Kingdom) Katie Johns	8	6
(United Kingdom) Peggy Dawson-Scott (United Kingdom) Betty Wilford	6	6
(United Kingdom) Gay Chandler (United Kingdom) Thelma Lister	1	4
(United States) Rita Anderson (United Kingdom) Joan Curry
(Italy) Manuela Bologna (Italy) Nicla Migliori	w/o
(United Kingdom) Patsy O'Connell (United Kingdom) Effie Peters	6	8
(United Kingdom) Audrey Bates (United Kingdom) Ada Ernest	2	6

Second round
3	(United States) B Davidson (United States) E Rosenquest	6	8
(United Kingdom) P Gotla (United Kingdom) B Knapp	4	6
(United Kingdom) B Walter (United Kingdom) G Woodgate	6	8
(United Kingdom) M Gordon (United Kingdom) M Halford	2	6
(United Kingdom) M Carlisle (United Kingdom) K Johns	1	1
(United Kingdom) P Dawson-Scott (United Kingdom) E Wilford	6	6
(United States) R Anderson (United Kingdom) J Curry	6	6
(United Kingdom) P O'Connell (United Kingdom) E Peters	1	4

Third round
3	(United States) B Davidson (United States) E Rosenquest	8	11
(United Kingdom) B Walter (United Kingdom) G Woodgate	6	9
(United Kingdom) P Dawson-Scott (United Kingdom) E Wilford	7	2	6
(United States) R Anderson (United Kingdom) J Curry	5	6	2

Quarterfinals
3	(United States) B Davidson (United States) E Rosenquest	8	6
(United Kingdom) P Dawson-Scott (United Kingdom) E Wilford	6	1

=== Bottom half ===
==== Section 3 ====
First round
(United Kingdom) Mrs MJ Baker (United Kingdom) Margaret Knott	6	6
(United Kingdom) Peggy Knight (United Kingdom) Enid Sutton	2	4
Q	(United Kingdom) Andy Ross-Dilley (United Kingdom) Joey Ross-Dilley	6	3	3
(United Kingdom) Mary Eyre (United Kingdom) Viola White	4	6	6
(United Kingdom) Margaret Emerson (United Kingdom) Billie Woodgate	6	6
(Norway) Ruth Haukenes (Argentina) Mary Terán de Weiss	4	4
(Kenya) Sheila Dowdeswell (United Kingdom) Pearl Panton	6	1	3
(Netherlands) Nel Hermsen (Netherlands) Mrs MA Schmier	1	6	6
(South Africa) Beryl Bartlett (Australia) Clare Proctor	6	6
(United Kingdom) Enid Andrews (United Kingdom) Vera Thomas	1	2
Q	(United Kingdom) Lesley Fulton (United Kingdom) Evelyn Moeller	5	3
(United Kingdom) Rosemary Bulleid (United Kingdom) Angela Mortimer	7	6
Q	(United Kingdom) Doreen Spiers (United Kingdom) Lorna White	9	3
(United Kingdom) Joy Hibbert (United Kingdom) Gem Hoahing	11	6
(United Kingdom) Helen Fletcher (United Kingdom) Pat Ward	1	2
4	(United States) Beverly Baker (United States) Nancy Chaffee	6	6

Second round
(United Kingdom) Mrs MJ Baker (United Kingdom) M Knott	4	6
(United Kingdom) M Eyre (United Kingdom) V White	6	8
(United Kingdom) M Emerson (United Kingdom) R Woodgate	1	2
(Netherlands) P Hermsen (Netherlands) Mrs MA Schmier	6	6
(South Africa) B Bartlett (Australia) C Proctor	6	6
(United Kingdom) R Bulleid (United Kingdom) A Mortimer	0	3
(United Kingdom) J Hibbert (United Kingdom) C Hoahing	1	0
4	(United States) B Baker (United States) N Chaffee	6	6

Third round
(United Kingdom) M Eyre (United Kingdom) V White	5	6	6
(Netherlands) P Hermsen (Netherlands) Mrs MA Schmier	7	1	2
(South Africa) B Bartlett (Australia) C Proctor	6	2	12
4	(United States) B Baker (United States) N Chaffee	4	6	14

Quarterfinals
(United Kingdom) M Eyre (United Kingdom) V White	2	4
4	(United States) B Baker (United States) N Chaffee	6	6

==== Section 4 ====
First round

Second round
(United Kingdom) Nancy Glover (United Kingdom) Freda Hammersley	6	2	2
(United Kingdom) Susan Partridge (United Kingdom) Anne Shilcock	2	6	6
Q	(United Kingdom) Lorna Cornell (United Kingdom) Elaine Watson	0	0
(United Kingdom) Jean Quertier (United Kingdom) Kay Tuckey	6	6
(United Kingdom) Pam Bocquet (United Kingdom) Sheila Speight	2	6	5
Q	(United Kingdom) Margaret Lewis (United Kingdom) Gwen Scott	6	1	7
(United Kingdom) Joey Lloyd (United Kingdom) Alex McKelvie	0	0
2	(United States) Shirley Fry (United States) Doris Hart	6	6

Third round
(United Kingdom) S Partridge (United Kingdom) A Shilcock	3	2
(United Kingdom) J Quertier (United Kingdom) K Tuckey	6	6
(United Kingdom) M Lewis (United Kingdom) G Scott	1	2
2	(United States) S Fry (United States) D Hart	6	6

Quarterfinals
(United Kingdom) J Quertier (United Kingdom) K Tuckey	3	1
2	(United States) S Fry (United States) D Hart	6	6
