= 1952 Wimbledon Championships – Women's singles =

Women's singles
- 1952 Wimbledon Championships

Final
- Champion: (United States) Maureen Connolly
- Runner-up: (United States) Louise Brough
- Score: 7–5, 6–3

Details
- Draw: 96 (10 Q )
- Seeds: 8

Events
| Singles | men | women | | boys | girls |
| Doubles | men | women | mixed | boys | girls |
| ← 1951 · | Wimbledon Championships | · 1953 → |

Maureen Connolly defeated Louise Brough in the final, 7–5, 6–3 to win the ladies' singles tennis title at the 1952 Wimbledon Championships. Doris Hart was the defending champion, but lost in the quarterfinals to Pat Todd.

== Seeds ==
1. (United States) Doris Hart (quarterfinals)
2. (United States) Maureen Connolly (champion)
3. (United States) Shirley Fry (semifinals)
4. (United States) Louise Brough (final)
5. (United States) Pat Todd (semifinals)
6. (United Kingdom) Jean Walker-Smith (quarterfinals)
7. (Australia) Thelma Long (quarterfinals)
8. (United Kingdom) Jean Rinkel-Quertier (quarterfinals)

Click on the seed number of a player to go to their draw section.

== Draw ==
=== Key ===
- Q = Qualifier
- WC = Wild card
- LL = Lucky loser
- Alt = Alternate
- SE = Special exempt
- PR = Protected ranking
- ITF = ITF entry
- JE = Junior exempt
- w/o = Walkover
- r = Retired
- d = Defaulted
- SR = Special ranking

=== Finals ===
Quarterfinals
2 | (United States) Maureen Connolly | 5 | 6 | 6
7 | (Australia) Thelma Long | 7 | 2 | 0
3 | (United States) Shirley Fry | 6 | 6
6 | (United Kingdom) Jean Walker-Smith | 3 | 3
8 | (United Kingdom) Jean Rinkel-Quertier | 1 | 7
4 | (United States) Louise Brough | 6 | 9
5 | (United States) Pat Todd | 6 | 7 | 6
1 | (United States) Doris Hart | 8 | 5 | 4

Semifinals
2 | (United States) Maureen Connolly | 6 | 6
3 | (United States) Shirley Fry | 4 | 3
4 | (United States) Louise Brough | 6 | 3 | 6
5 | (United States) Pat Todd | 3 | 6 | 1

Final
2 | (United States) Maureen Connolly | 7 | 6
4 | (United States) Louise Brough | 5 | 3

=== Top half ===
==== Section 1 ====
First round

Second round
2 | (United States) Maureen Connolly | 6 | 6
(United Kingdom) Evelyn Moeller | 2 | 0
(United States) Rita Anderson | 2 | 2
(United Kingdom) Angela Mortimer | 6 | 6
(United Kingdom) Barbara Knapp | 6 | 4 | 6
(United Kingdom) Lorna Cornell | 3 | 6 | 3
(France) Jacqueline Kermina | 6 | 2
(United Kingdom) Susan Partridge | 8 | 6

Third round
2 | (United States) M Connolly | 6 | 6
(United Kingdom) A Mortimer | 4 | 3
(United Kingdom) B Knapp | 4 | 7
(United Kingdom) S Partridge | 6 | 9

Fourth round
2 | (United States) M Connolly | 6 | 5 | 7
(United Kingdom) S Partridge | 3 | 7 | 5

==== Section 2 ====
First round

Second round
7 | (Australia) Thelma Long | 6 | 6
(United Kingdom) Helen Proudfoot | 1 | 0
(Switzerland) Violette Rigollet | 6 | 6
(United Kingdom) Betty Wilford | 3 | 4
(United Kingdom) Meriel Morgan | 2 | 2
(Argentina) Mary Terán de Weiss | 6 | 6
(United Kingdom) Viola White | 6 | 6
(United States) Charlotte Decker | 2 | 4

Third round
7 | (Australia) Long | 6 | 6
(Switzerland) V Rigollet | 1 | 4
(Argentina) M Terán de Weiss | 4 | 1^{r}
(United Kingdom) V White | 6 | 4

Fourth round
7 | (Australia) T Long | 6 | 6
(United Kingdom) V White | 2 | 1

==== Section 3 ====
First round
3 | (United States) Shirley Fry | 6 | 6
(United Kingdom) Mary Halford | 0 | 0
Q | (United Kingdom) Jacqueline Beswick | 2 | 2
(New Zealand) Evelyn Attwood | 6 | 6
(United Kingdom) Janet Morgan | 6 | 6
(United Kingdom) Shirley Bloomer | 1 | 4
(Republic of Ireland) Betty Lombard | 6 | 6
(Belgium) Janine de Ridder | 2 | 2
(United Kingdom) Jean Trower | 6 | 6
(United Kingdom) Pat Gotla | 3 | 3
(Austria) Helga Strecker | 6 | 2 | 3
Q | (United Kingdom) Elaine Watson | 2 | 6 | 6
(United Kingdom) Norma Potts | 1 | 7 | 7
(United Kingdom) Jenny Wagstaff | 6 | 5 | 5
(United Kingdom) Pearl Panton | 4 | 3
(France) Michelle Bourbonnais | 6 | 6

Second round
3 | (United States) S Fry | 6 | 6
(New Zealand) E Attwood | 2 | 2
(United Kingdom) J Morgan | 2 | 2
(Republic of Ireland) E Lombard | 6 | 6
(United Kingdom) J Trower | 5 | 2
Q | (United Kingdom) E Watson | 7 | 6
(United Kingdom) N Potts | 2 | 1
(France) M Bourbonnais | 6 | 6

Third round
3 | (United States) S Fry | 6 | 6
(Republic of Ireland) E Lombard | 2 | 1
Q | (United Kingdom) E Watson | 3 | 4
(France) M Bourbonnais | 6 | 6

Fourth round
3 | (United States) S Fry | 6 | 6
(France) M Bourbonnais | 4 | 0

==== Section 4 ====
First round
6 | (United Kingdom) Jean Walker-Smith | 6 | 6
(France) Suzanne Schmitt | 3 | 4
(United Kingdom) Laura Morgan | 1 | 2
(South Africa) Hazel Redick-Smith | 6 | 6
(United Kingdom) Rosemary Bulleid | 6 | 1 | 2
(United Kingdom) Pat Harrison | 3 | 6 | 6
(South Africa) Doreen Wedderburn | 3 | 4
Q | (Egypt) Betsy Abbas | 6 | 6
(United Kingdom) Edie Luxton | 1 | 2
(Netherlands) Joopy Roos-Van der Wal | 6 | 6
(United Kingdom) Pat Ward | 6 | 6
(Czechoslovakia) Helena Matouš | 2 | 3
(United Kingdom) Georgie Woodgate | 6 | 6
(United Kingdom) Noelle Knight | 4 | 0
(United Kingdom) Valerie Lewis | 3 | 6 | 6
LL | (United Kingdom) Angela Buxton | 6 | 3 | 3

Second round
6 | (United Kingdom) J Walker-Smith | 6 | 6
(South Africa) H Redick-Smith | 1 | 4
(United Kingdom) P Harrison | 6 | 5 | 6
Q | (Egypt) B Abbas | 4 | 7 | 4
(Netherlands) J Roos-Van der Wal | 6 | 2
(United Kingdom) P Ward | 8 | 6
(United Kingdom) G Woodgate | 6 | 6
(United Kingdom) V Lewis | 3 | 4

Third round
6 | (United Kingdom) J Walker-Smith | 6 | 6
(United Kingdom) P Harrison | 1 | 3
(United Kingdom) P Ward | 5 | 6 | 1
(United Kingdom) G Woodgate | 7 | 4 | 6

Fourth round
6 | (United Kingdom) J Walker-Smith | 6 | 6
(United Kingdom) G Woodgate | 1 | 1

=== Bottom half ===
==== Section 5 ====
First round
(West Germany) Inge Pohmann | 4 | 6 | 1
(United Kingdom) Peggy Dawson-Scott | 6 | 3 | 6
(United Kingdom) Margaret Knott | 2 | 6 | 4
(United Kingdom) Elsie Phillips | 6 | 2 | 6
(United Kingdom) Billie Woodgate | 6 | 4 | 6
(Austria) Elizabeth Broz | 3 | 6 | 1
(Australia) Nell Hopman | 6 | 6
Q | (United Kingdom) Margaret Carlisle | 0 | 0
Q | (United Kingdom) Joan MacLeod | 2 | 4
(United Kingdom) Helen Fletcher | 6 | 6
(United Kingdom) Wendy Morris | 2 | 1
(South Africa) Beryl Bartlett | 6 | 6
(United Kingdom) Gwen Scott | 1 | 2
Q | (United Kingdom) Bobbie Wilson | 6 | 6
(United Kingdom) Dorothy Cooper | 1 | 3
8 | (United Kingdom) Jean Rinkel-Quertier | 6 | 6

Second round
(United Kingdom) P Dawson-Scott | 6 | 6
(United Kingdom) E Phillips | 3 | 2
(United Kingdom) R Woodgate | 3 | 0
(Australia) E Hopman | 6 | 6
(United Kingdom) H Fletcher | 4 | 6 | 6
(South Africa) B Bartlett | 6 | 3 | 0
Q | (United Kingdom) B Wilson | 1 | 3
8 | (United Kingdom) J Rinkel-Quertier | 6 | 6

Third round
(United Kingdom) P Dawson-Scott | 6 | 3 | 6
(Australia) E Hopman | 2 | 6 | 2
(United Kingdom) H Fletcher | 0 | 4
8 | (United Kingdom) J Rinkel-Quertier | 6 | 6

Fourth round
(United Kingdom) P Dawson-Scott | 1 | 2
8 | (United Kingdom) J Rinkel-Quertier | 6 | 6

==== Section 6 ====
First round
(United Kingdom) Vera Thomas | 6 | 6
(Netherlands) Nel Hermsen | 3 | 1
(United Kingdom) Effie Peters | 6 | 5 | 3
Q | (United Kingdom) Sheila Speight | 2 | 7 | 6
(United Kingdom) Margot Parker | 4 | 6 | 6
(United Kingdom) Audrey Bates | 6 | 3 | 1
(United Kingdom) Gem Hoahing | 3 | 2
(France) Nelly Adamson | 6 | 6
(United Kingdom) Jean Petchell | 5 | 3
(South Africa) Gwendolyn Love | 7 | 6
(United Kingdom) Rosemary Walsh | 4 | 2
(Australia) B Penrose | 6 | 6
(United Kingdom) Gay Chandler | 4 | 6 | 5
(United Kingdom) Thelma Lister | 6 | 4 | 3^{r}
(United Kingdom) Pat Lewis | 1 | 0
4 | (United States) Louise Brough | 6 | 6

Second round
(United Kingdom) V Thomas | 4 | 8 | 6
Q | (United Kingdom) S Speight | 6 | 6 | 2
(United Kingdom) M Parker | 4 | 1
(France) N Adamson | 6 | 6
(South Africa) G Love | 2 | 1
(Australia) B Penrose | 6 | 6
(United Kingdom) G Chandler | 0 | 0
4 | (United States) L Brough | 6 | 6

Third round
(United Kingdom) V Thomas | 6 | 3
(France) N Adamson | 8 | 6
(Australia) B Penrose | 2 | 1
4 | (United States) L Brough | 6 | 6

Fourth round
(France) N Adamson | 6 | 1 | 2
4 | (United States) L Brough | 1 | 6 | 6

==== Section 7 ====
First round

Second round
Q | (United Kingdom) Frances Walthew | 6 | 3
Q | (United Kingdom) Enid Kerr | 4 | 0^{r}
(United States) Dorothy Head | 6 | 6
(Finland) Thelma Salo | 3 | 2
(United Kingdom) Gladys Lines | 1 | 1
(United Kingdom) Joan Curry | 6 | 6
(United States) Arvilla McGuire | 0 | 2
5 | (United States) Pat Todd | 6 | 6

Third round
Q | (United Kingdom) F Walthew | 0 | 0
(United States) D Head | 6 | 6
(United Kingdom) J Curry | 3 | 3
5 | (United States) P Todd | 6 | 6

Fourth round
(United States) D Head | 4 | 3
5 | (United States) P Todd | 6 | 6

==== Section 8 ====
First round

Second round
Q | (United Kingdom) Mary Harris | 5 | 3
(United Kingdom) Leonie Brighton | 7 | 6
(South Africa) Julia Wipplinger | 4 | 6 | 7
(Belgium) Christiane Mercelis | 6 | 4 | 5
(United States) Baba Lewis | 6 | 6
(Argentina) Elena Lehmann | 3 | 1
LL | (United Kingdom) SI Odling | 1 | 0
1 | (United States) Doris Hart | 6 | 6

Third round
(United Kingdom) L Brighton | 4 | 1
(South Africa) J Wipplinger | 6 | 6
(United States) B Lewis | 1 | 6 | 1
1 | (United States) D Hart | 6 | 2 | 6

Fourth round
(South Africa) J Wipplinger | 4 | 6 | 3
1 | (United States) D Hart | 6 | 4 | 6

| Preceded by 1952 French Championships – Women's singles | Grand Slam women's singles | Succeeded by 1952 U.S. National Championships – Women's singles |
