= 1952 French Championships – Women's singles =

Women's singles
- 1952 French Championships

Final
- Champion: (United States) Doris Hart
- Runner-up: (United States) Shirley Fry
- Score: 6–4, 6–4

Details
- Draw: 49
- Seeds: 16

Events
| Singles | men | women |
| Doubles | men | women |
| ← 1951 · | French Championships | · 1953 → |

Second-seeded Doris Hart defeated Shirley Fry 6–4, 6–4 in the final to win the women's singles tennis title at the 1952 French Championships.

== Seeds ==
The seeded players are listed below. Doris Hart is the champion; others show the round in which they were eliminated.

1. (United States) Shirley Fry (finalist)
2. (United States) Doris Hart (champion)
3. (United States) Dorothy Head (semifinals)
4. (United Kingdom) Susan Partridge (first round)
5. (Argentina) Mary Terán de Weiss (quarterfinals)
6. (France) Ginette Bucaille (first round)
7. (Argentina) Elena Lehmann (third round)
8. (Switzerland) Violette Rigollet (third round)
9. (United Kingdom) Joan P. Curry (quarterfinals)
10. (South Africa) Julia Wipplinger (quarterfinals)
11. (France) Raymonde Jones-Veber (third round)
12. (France) Jacqueline Patorni (second round)
13. (South Africa) Hazel Redick-Smith (semifinals)
14. (West Germany) Erika Vollmer-Obst (second round)
15. (Belgium) Christiane Mercelis (third round)
16. (Netherlands) Joopy Van Der Wall-Roos (third round)

== Draw ==
=== Key ===
- Q = Qualifier
- WC = Wild card
- LL = Lucky loser
- r = Retired

=== Finals ===
Quarterfinals
1 | (United States) Shirley Fry | 4 | 6 | 6
9 | (United Kingdom) Joan P. Curry | 6 | 0 | 3
13 | (South Africa) Hazel Redick-Smith | 6 | 6
5 | (Argentina) María Weiss | 3 | 1
(United Kingdom) Joy Mottram | 3 | 6 | 5
3 | (United States) Dorothy Head | 6 | 4 | 7
10 | (South Africa) Julia Wipplinger | 6 | 4
2 | (United States) Doris Hart | 8 | 6

Semifinals
1 | (United States) Shirley Fry | 7 | 6
13 | (South Africa) Hazel Redick-Smith | 5 | 4
3 | (United States) Dorothy Head | 2 | 6
2 | (United States) Doris Hart | 6 | 8

Finals
1 | (United States) Shirley Fry | 4 | 4
2 | (United States) Doris Hart | 6 | 6

=== Earlier rounds ===
==== Section 1 ====
First round

Second round
1 | (United States) Fry | 6 | 6
(France) Bernard | 0 | 0
16 | (Netherlands) Van Der Wall-Roos | 6 | 6
(United Kingdom) Carlisle | 2 | 0
8 | (Switzerland) Rigollet
(Italy) Frisaco
(France) Coste | w/o
9 | (United Kingdom) Curry

Third round
1 | (United States) Fry | 6 | 6
16 | (Netherlands) Van Der Wall-Roos | 1 | 0
8 | (Switzerland) Rigollet | 0 | 1
9 | (United Kingdom) Curry | 6 | 6

Quarterfinals
1 | (United States) Fry | 4 | 6 | 6
9 | (United Kingdom) Curry | 6 | 0 | 3

==== Section 2 ====
First round
4 | (United Kingdom) Partridge | 3 | 6 | 2
(France) Gazeau | 6 | 3 | 6
(Sweden) Bonström | 10 | 1 | 1
(France) Lemal | 8 | 6 | 6
(France) De Cazalet
(France) Cor
(France) Amouretti | 0 | 2
13 | (South Africa) Redick-Smith | 6 | 6
(France) Savoye | 0 | 2
5 | (Argentina) Weiss | 6 | 6
(France) Seghers | 7 | 4
(United Kingdom) Ward | 9 | 6
12 | (France) Patorni | 6 | 6
(Switzerland) Charbonnier | 0 | 4
(Netherlands) Ten Bosch
(United States) McGuire

Second round
(France) Gazeau | 1 | 6 | 6
(France) Lemal | 6 | 2 | 4
(France) Cor | 1 | 2
13 | (South Africa) Redick-Smith | 6 | 6
5 | (Argentina) Weiss | 6 | 6
(United Kingdom) Ward | 3 | 1
12 | (France) Patorni | 4 | 4
(United States) McGuire | 6 | 6

Third round
(France) Gazeau | 3 | 3
13 | (South Africa) Redick-Smith | 6 | 6
5 | (Argentina) Weiss | 6 | 6
(United States) McGuire | 1 | 2

Quarterfinals
13 | (South Africa) Redick-Smith | 6 | 6
5 | (Argentina) Weiss | 3 | 1

==== Section 3 ====
First round
(France) Dubois | 6 | 7
(Australia) Hopman | 4 | 5
(Italy) Bologna
11 | (France) Jones-Veber
(France) Galtier | 2 | 1
(France) Boutin | 6 | 6
(United Kingdom) Mottram | 6 | 6
6 | (France) Bucaille | 0 | 3
(France) Varin | 3 | 1
(Australia) Penrose | 6 | 6
(France) Kermina | 4 | 6 | 11
14 | (West Germany) Vollmer-Obst | 6 | 2 | 13
(Belgium) Isaac
(France) Haillet-Passet
(France) Schmitt | 0 | 3
3 | (United States) Head | 6 | 6

Second round
(France) Dubois | 6 | 6 | 4
11 | (France) Jones-Veber | 8 | 4 | 6
(France) Boutin | 0 | 1
(United Kingdom) Mottram | 6 | 6
(Australia) Penrose | 6 | 3 | 6
14 | (West Germany) Vollmer-Obst | 3 | 6 | 4
(Belgium) Isaac | 0 | 1
3 | (United States) Head | 6 | 6

Third round
11 | (France) Jones-Veber | 5 | 6 | 4
(United Kingdom) Mottram | 7 | 1 | 6
(Australia) Penrose | 2 | 2
3 | (United States) Head | 6 | 6

Quarterfinals
(United Kingdom) Mottram | 3 | 6 | 5
3 | (United States) Head | 6 | 4 | 7

==== Section 4 ====
First round
(France) Foy | 1 | 0
(France) Bourbonnais | 6 | 6

Second round
(France) Bourbonnais | 5 | 2
10 | (South Africa) Wipplinger | 7 | 6
(France) Pannetier | 2 | 2
7 | (Argentina) Lehmann | 6 | 6
15 | (Belgium) Mercelis | 7 | 6
(France) Jamain | 5 | 4
(France) De La Giroday | 1 | 5
2 | (United States) Hart | 6 | 7

Third round
10 | (South Africa) Wipplinger | 6 | 6
7 | (Argentina) Lehmann | 4 | 1
15 | (Belgium) Mercelis | 5 | 8
2 | (United States) Hart | 7 | 10

Quarterfinals
10 | (South Africa) Wipplinger | 6 | 4
2 | (United States) Hart | 8 | 6

| Preceded by 1952 Australian Championships – Women's singles | Grand Slam women's singles | Succeeded by 1952 Wimbledon Championships – Women's singles |
