= Sutton Coldfield Hard Courts Championship =

Defunct tennis tournament
- Tour: ILTF Circuit
- Founded: 1926; 99 years ago
- Abolished: 1965; 60 years ago
- Location: Sutton Coldfield, Warwickshire, England
- Venue: Sutton Coldfield Tennis Club
- Surface: Clay

The Sutton Coldfield Hard Courts Championship also known as the Sutton Coldfield Hard Courts was a men's and women's clay court tennis tournament founded in 1926 as the Sutton Coldfield Hard Courts Lawn Tennis Club Tournament. The event was staged annually at Sutton Coldfield Tennis Club, Sutton Coldfield, Warwickshire, England until 1965.

== History ==
In 1922 the Sutton Coldfield Hard Courts Lawn Tennis Club was founded. In 1926 the club established the Sutton Coldfield Hard Courts Lawn Tennis Club Tournament. It was staged annually until 1939 when it was suspended due to World War II. The tournament did not resume until 1949 in part due to a lack of water still not available after the war to maintain its courts. In 1950 it was rebranded as the Sutton Coldfield Hard Court Championships. The tournament continued to held through to 1965 when it was discontinued. Sutton Coldfield Tennis Club is still active today.

== Finals ==
=== Men's Singles ===
Incomplete roll includes:

Sutton Coldfield Hard Courts Lawn Tennis Club Tournament
Year	Winners	Runners-up	Score
1937	(United Kingdom) Norman Taylor	(Republic of China (1912–1949)) Kho Sin-Khie	3-6, 9–7, 6-2
1938	(United Kingdom) Norman Taylor (2)	(United Kingdom) Jimmy Jones	3-6, 9–7, 6-2
Sutton Coldfield Hard Courts Championship
1949	(United Kingdom) Tony Mottram	(United Kingdom) Howard F. Walton	6-0 6-3
1950	(Hong Kong) Koon Hung Ip	(United Kingdom) Wilfred D. Rowe	6-0 6-3
1951	(Australia) Peter Cawthorn	(Poland) Ignacy Tloczynski	6-2, 9-7
1952	(Australia) Peter Cawthorn (2)	(Australia) Don Tregonning	6-2, 8–10, 6-3
1953	(Australia) Jack Arkinstall	(United Kingdom) John Horn	6-0 6-1
1954	(South Africa) David Samaai	(United States) Don Hamilton	7-5, 3–6, 6-3
1955	(Australia) Bill Gilmour Sr.	(United Kingdom) Tony Mottram	4-6, 7–5, 6-3
1956	(Australia) Brian C. Bowman	(United Kingdom) Robert J (Bob) Lee	6-1, 6-4
1957	(United Kingdom) Roger Becker	(South Africa) Derek Lawer	6-3, 6-2
1958	(New Zealand) Lew Gerrard	(South Africa) John Hurry	3-6, 6–4, 8-6
1959	(South Africa) Robin Sanders	(United Kingdom) Howard Walton	6-2, 6-3
1960	(South Africa) Robin Sanders (2)	(South Africa) Gaetan Koenig	6-2, 6-3
1963	(Australia) John Hillebrand	(Australia) Martin Mulligan	6-4, 8-6
1964	(United Kingdom) Roy Dixon	(Australia) John Hillebrand	6-2, 8-6
1965	(United Kingdom) Roy Dixon (2)	(West Germany) Uwe Gottschalk	3-6, 6–4, 6-4

=== Women's singles ===
Incomplete roll includes.

Sutton Coldfield Hard Courts Lawn Tennis Club Tournament
Year	Winners	Runners-up	Score
1933	(United Kingdom) E. Woodhall	(United Kingdom) Olga Greenwood	6-2, 1–6, 6-3
1939	(United Kingdom) Betty Clements	(United Kingdom) Molly Wadlow	6-1, 6-3
Sutton Coldfield Hard Courts Championship
1950	(United Kingdom) Barbara Knapp	(United Kingdom) Gillian Gittings Worrall	6-3, 7-5
1951	(United Kingdom) Margaret Emerson	(United Kingdom) Sheila Speight	7-5, 6-1
1952	(United Kingdom) Rosemary Walsh	(United Kingdom) Hazel Cheadle	6-4, 6-3
1953	(United Kingdom) Hazel Cheadle	(United Kingdom) Audrey Housley	6-2, 7-5
1954	(United Kingdom) Angela Mortimer	(United Kingdom) Heather Nicholls Brewer	6-4, 6-3
1955	(Australia) Daphne Seeney	(United Kingdom) Hazel Cheadle	6-2, 3–6, 7-5
1956	(United Kingdom) Anne Shilcock	(United Kingdom) Ann Haydon	3-6, 9–7, 6-4
1957	(United Kingdom) Angela Mortimer (2)	(United Kingdom) Rita Bentley	9-7, 7-5
1958	(United Kingdom) Angela Mortimer (3)	(United Kingdom) Rita Bentley	6-4 6-0
1959	(United Kingdom) Angela Mortimer (4)	(United Kingdom) Ann Haydon	6-2, 6-2
1960	(United Kingdom) Barbara Drew	(France) Françoise Dürr	6-1, 9-7
1963	(United Kingdom) Hazel Cheadle	(United Kingdom) Jean Haskew	6-1, 6-2
1964	(United Kingdom) Ann Haydon Jones	(United Kingdom) Rita Bentley	1-6, 8–6, 6-4
1965	(Australia) Pat McClenaughan	(Australia) Faye Toyne	6-3, 6-1

== Tournament records ==
=== Men's singles ===
- Most Men's Titles: (United Kingdom) Norman Taylor & (Australia) Peter Cawthorn & (South Africa) Robin Sanders & (United Kingdom) Roy Dixon (2)
- Most Men's Finals: (United Kingdom) Norman Taylor & (Australia) Peter Cawthorn & (South Africa) Robin Sanders & (United Kingdom) Roy Dixon & (United Kingdom) Tony Mottram & (Australia) John Hillebrand (2)

=== Women's singles ===
- Most Women's Titles: (United Kingdom) Angela Mortimer (4)
- Most Women's Finals: (United Kingdom) Angela Mortimer (4)
