= Bedford Open =

Men's and women's grass court tennis tournament established in 1880

Defunct tennis tournament
- Founded: 1880; 146 years ago
- Abolished: 1974; 52 years ago
- Location: Bedford, Berkshire, England
- Venue: Bedford Lawn Tennis Club
- Surface: Grass

The Bedford Open also known as the Bedford Lawn Tennis Open Tournament was men's and women's grass court tennis tournament established in 1880 as the Bedfordshire LTC Tournament. It was held at the Bedford Lawn Tennis Club, Bedford, Berkshire, England and ran through until 1974 when it was abolished.

== History ==
The first Bedfordshire Lawn Tennis Club evolved out of a croquet club established in June 1871 by the Brooks family of Flitwick Manor. The first tournament tennis was played there on 29 August 1876, one year before the first Wimbledon Championships were held. Records show that the field consisted of six pairs, the final grouping included a Mr G. Tylecote and Miss P. Hodgson who beat Mr. and Mrs. Cobbe in the mixed doubles.

By 1879 at least two lawn tennis clubs had been established in Bedfordshire, the South Bedfordshire Lawn Tennis Club (LTC), that usually staged tennis events at Flitwick Manor, Wrest Park, Silsoe and Cranfield Court. The North Bedfordshire LTC had courts at Sutton Manor, Sutton and Sandye Place. Between 1884 and 1885 both the North and South Bedfordshire LTCs had ceased to operate. Between 1882 and 1884 a new Bedfordshire LTC was established at Bedford on land next to Bedford College. The current Bedford LTC based at Bradgate Road (f.1890), is thought to be the successor club to Bedfordshire LTC.

From 1880 the South Bedfordshire LTC organised three recorded tournaments held at Fairfield Park, Stotfold, and two editions at Blunham House, Blunham, Bedford. In July 1882 a second edition of a Bedfordshire tournament was held on 18 July that year. On 28 August the Bedfordshire LTC had concluded a tournament the gentleman's singles was won by Mr. A. Payne, the ladies singles was won by Miss. A. Lindsell and the veteran's singles was won by a Reverend H. B. Allen.

In 1891 the Bedford Open was founded. In July 1939 the tournament held its 48th annual open event. this event ran through till 1966 before it ceased. In 1974 the tournament was revived for one edition only. This highly popular event was a regular stop on the senior worldwide tour for many years. Former winners of the men's single's title has included; Alan Stedman, Nigel Sharpe, John Bromwich, Erik Bjerre, Ignacy Tłoczyński, Peter Cawthorn, Czeslaw Spychala, Mike Davies, Bobby Wilson, Frew McMillan, Keith Diepraam, Alan Mills and Alberto Esplugas. The previous winners of the women's singles title has included; Evelyn Blencowe, Ruth Pennington-Legh Winch, Phyllis Satterthwaite, Phoebe Holcroft Watson, Elsie Goldsack Pittman, Gem Hoahing, Lorna Cornell, Rita Bentley, and Angela Mortimer.

== Venue ==
The Bedford Open Tennis Tournament was held continuously for 76 years at the Bedford Lawn Tennis Club. In the late 1990s Bedford LTC which then consisted of 10 grass courts and 2 hard courts, had to move from its Bradgate road grounds due to the land being redeveloped. The club moved to new premises at Chester Road, Bedford, where it still operates today.

== Finals ==
=== Men's Singles ===
(incomplete roll)

Year	Winner	Runner-up	Score
Bedfordshire LTC Tournament
1880	(United Kingdom) Robert James Lindsell	(United Kingdom) Frederick Willis	?
1881	(United Kingdom) Cecil Henry Polhill-Turner	(United Kingdom) R. Hughes	6-4, 6–4, 6–5
1882	(United Kingdom) E. Horley	(United Kingdom) R. Hughes	?
1883	(United Kingdom) S. Burton	(United Kingdom) A.A. Cooper	?
Bedford Open
1899	(United Kingdom) Harold L. Whale	(United Kingdom) Bernard Wood-Hill	3–6, 6–4, 6–4
1909	(United Kingdom) Charles Bernard Besly Yule	(Australia) Leslie Poidevin	6–1, 6–4
1914/1918	Not held (due to World War I)		
1934	(New Zealand) Alan Stedman	(United Kingdom) George Godsell	6–1, 7–5
1935	(United States) Roland O. Williams	(United Kingdom) Frederic Robin Kipping	6–1, 6–1
1936	(United Kingdom) Nigel Sharpe	(United Kingdom) Derek Bouquet	6–8, 6–1, 6–1
1937	(United Kingdom) Nigel Sharpe (2)	(United Kingdom) Lawrence Shaffi	7–9, 6–4, 6–3
1938	(United Kingdom) Nigel Sharpe (3)	(United Kingdom) Lawrence Shaffi	7–5, 6–3
1940/1946	Not held (due to World War I)		
1947	(New Zealand) Owen Murray Bold	(United Kingdom) A. Dawes	6–3, 6–1
1948	(Australia) John Bromwich	(Poland) Czesław Spychała	6–3, 6–2
1949	(Denmark) Erik Bjerre	(South Africa) David Samaai	9–7, 3–6, 6–2
1950	(Poland) Ignacy Tłoczyński	(United Kingdom) Tony Starte	7–5, 6–1, 7–5
1951	(Australia) Peter Cawthorn	(United Kingdom) Dick Guise	6–0, 6–3
1952	(Poland) Czesław Spychała	(United Kingdom) John Horn	3–6, 6–3, 6–0
1953	(United Kingdom) Mike Davies	(United Kingdom) David Moss	6-2, 6–2
1954	(United Kingdom) Mike Davies (2)	(United Kingdom) David H. Williams	6-3, 6–4
1955	(United Kingdom) Gerry Oakley	(United Kingdom) Alan Mills	7–5, 6–4
1956	(Australia) John F. O'Brien	(Pakistan) Khwaja Saeed Hai	3–6, 6–1, 6–2
1957	(United Kingdom) Gerry Oakley (2)	(Australia) Peter Frankland	6–4, 7–5
1959	(United Kingdom) Alan Mills	(United Kingdom) Michael Sangster	6–3, 6–1
1960	(United Kingdom) Bobby Wilson	(United Kingdom) Michael Sangster	7-5, 6–1
1962	(South Africa) Keith Diepraam	(United Kingdom) Alan Mills	6–4, 6–2
1966	(Spain) Alberto Esplugas	(Spain) Jorge Marfa	6–2, 6–4
Open era
1974	(United Kingdom) Bobby Wilson (2)	(United Kingdom) T.E. Mabbitt	6–1, 6–0

=== Women's Singles ===
(incomplete roll)

Year	Winner	Runner-up	Score
Bedford Open
1892	(United Kingdom) Evelyn Blencowe	(United Kingdom) Henrietta Horncastle	6-3, 6–2
1909	(United Kingdom) Mrs Cole	(United Kingdom) M.T. Gross	w.o.
1910	(United Kingdom) Ruth Winch	(United Kingdom) Miss Scott	6-4, 6–0
1911	(United Kingdom) Ruth Winch (2)	(United Kingdom) E.M. White	6–1, 6–2
1912	(United Kingdom) Ruth Winch (3)	(United Kingdom) A. Sargent	6-2, 6–4
1913	(United Kingdom) E.M. White	(United Kingdom) Miss Sargent	3-6, 6–3, 3-0 ret.
1914	(United Kingdom) Phyllis Satterthwaite	(United Kingdom) Ruth Winch	6-1, 6–1
1915/1918	Not held due to World War I		
1921	(United Kingdom) Ruth Winch (4)	(United Kingdom) Miss Dalton	6-4, 6–0
1922	(United Kingdom) Ruth Winch (5)	(United Kingdom) A. Sargent	6-2, 6–1
1924	(United Kingdom) R. Fletcher	(United Kingdom) A. Wells	6-3, 10–8
1925	(United Kingdom) Phoebe Holcroft	(United Kingdom) Betty Boas	6–3, 6–0
1926	(United Kingdom) Phoebe Holcroft Watson (2)	(United Kingdom) Claire Beckingham	6-2, 6–1
1927	(United Kingdom) Betty Boas	(United Kingdom) D. Haines	6-2, 6–4
1928	(United Kingdom) Naomi Trentham	(United Kingdom) E. Howes	6-2, 6–4
1929	(United Kingdom) Naomi Trentham (2)	(United Kingdom) Joan Ridley	6-4, 7–5
1930	(United Kingdom) Margaret Walsh Mellows	(United Kingdom) Sylvia Mayne	8-6, 6–4
1931	(United Kingdom) Freda Scott	(United Kingdom) E. Howes	6-2, 6–3
1932	(United Kingdom) Freda Scott (2)	(United Kingdom) Ruth Armstrong Kirk	6-4, 6–3
1933	(United Kingdom) N.C. Case	(United Kingdom) Helen Foster Dyson	9-7, 6–1
1934	(United Kingdom) N. Hill	(United Kingdom) M. MacTier	6-3, 1–6, 6–3
1935	(United Kingdom) N. Hill (2)	(United Kingdom) M. MacTier	8-6, 6–3
1936	(United Kingdom) Effie Hemmant Peters	(United Kingdom) Billie Yorke	6-3, 6–3
1937	(United Kingdom) Elsie Goldsack Pittman	(United Kingdom) Betty Batt	5–7, 6–3, 6–4
1938	(United Kingdom) Valerie Scott	(United Kingdom) Elsie Goldsack Pittman	6-0, 6–4
1939	Event divided between 4 players		
1940/1946	Not held due to World War II		
1947	(United Kingdom) Gem Hoahing	(United Kingdom) M. Smith	6-0, 6–1
1948	(United Kingdom) Gem Hoahing (2)	(United Kingdom) Betty Batt Passingham	6-1, 6–2
1949	(United Kingdom) Gem Hoahing (3)	(United Kingdom) Edith Middleton	6-3, 6–1
1950	(United Kingdom) Jean Knight	(United Kingdom) M. Graham	6-4, 6–3
1951	(United Kingdom) Lorna Cornell	(United Kingdom) Elaine Watson	6-4, 6–2
1952	(United Kingdom) Elaine Watson	(United Kingdom) Joyce Reid	6–1, 6–1
1953	(New Zealand) Evelyn Attwood	(United Kingdom) Jean Knight	6-0, 6–2
1954	(United Kingdom) Jean Knight	(New Zealand) Evelyn Attwood	6-2, 6–2
1955	(United Kingdom) Sheila Armstrong	(United Kingdom) Rita Bentley	6-1, 6–4
1956	(United Kingdom) Jean Knight (2)	(United Kingdom) E. Tudor	6-0, 6–0
1957	(United Kingdom) Rita Bentley	(United Kingdom) Margaret R. O'Donnell	6–3, 6–2
1958	(United Kingdom) Rita Bentley (2)	(United Kingdom) Margaret R. O'Donnell	6-3, 6–3
1959	(United Kingdom) Angela Mortimer	(United Kingdom) Margaret R. O'Donnell	8–6, 6–3
1960	(United Kingdom) Angela Mortimer (2)	(United Kingdom) Shirley Bloomer Brasher	6–2, 6–1
1961	(United States) Pat Stewart	(United Kingdom) Honor Durose	6-3, 8–10, 7–5
1962	(United Kingdom) Carole Rosser	(United Kingdom) Diane Tuckey	6-4, 6–2
1963	(United Kingdom) Heather Allen	(United Kingdom) Carole Rosser	divided title
1964	(United Kingdom) Heather Allen (2)	(United Kingdom) Sue Tutt	w.o.
1965	(United Kingdom) Sue Tutt	(United Kingdom) Jean Haskew	6–3, 6–1
1966	(United Kingdom) Sue Tutt (2)	(United Kingdom) Anthea Rigby	6-2, 6–4
Open era
1974	(United Kingdom) Sandra Coe	(United Kingdom) E. Evans	6–3, 6–4
