= 1952 Wimbledon Championships – Boys' singles =

Boys' singles
- 1952 Wimbledon Championships

Final
- Champion: (United Kingdom) Bobby Wilson
- Runner-up: (South Africa) Trevor Fancutt
- Score: 6–3, 6–3

Events
Singles	men	women		boys	girls
Doubles	men	women	mixed	boys	girls
← 1951 ·	Wimbledon Championships	· 1953 →

Bobby Wilson defeated Trevor Fancutt in the final, 6–3, 6–3 to win the boys' singles tennis title at the 1952 Wimbledon Championships.

== Draw ==
=== Key ===
- Q = Qualifier
- WC = Wild card
- LL = Lucky loser
- Alt = Alternate
- SE = Special exempt
- PR = Protected ranking
- ITF = ITF entry
- JE = Junior exempt
- w/o = Walkover
- r = Retired
- d = Defaulted
- SR = Special ranking

=== Finals ===
Semifinals
(Sweden) Ulf Schmidt	5	4
(United Kingdom) Bobby Wilson	7	6
(South Africa) Trevor Fancutt	6	3	6
(Philippines) Juan Jose	2	6	2

Final
(United Kingdom) Bobby Wilson	6	6
(South Africa) Trevor Fancutt	3	3

=== Top half ===
First round
(Australia) Kevin Meyer	6	6
(Belgium) J Kirkpatrick	3	4

Second round
(France) Pierre Darmon	2	2
(India) Ramanathan Krishnan	6	6
(Sweden) Ulf Schmidt	6	6
(Denmark) Jørgen Ulrich	3	2
(Norway) C Vik	6	4	6
(Switzerland) F Bollinger	3	6	8
(United Kingdom) Bobby Wilson	6	6
(Australia) K Meyer	1	1

Quarterfinals
(India) R Krishnan	4	7
(Sweden) U Schmidt	6	9
(Switzerland) F Bollinger	1	4
(United Kingdom) R Wilson	6	6

Semifinals
(Sweden) U Schmidt	5	4
(United Kingdom) R Wilson	7	6

=== Bottom half ===
First round

Second round
(Greece) DM Dimitriadis	2	2
(Finland) S Carlsson	6	6
(South Africa) Trevor Fancutt	6	6
(Republic of Ireland) Cecil Pedlow	1	0
(Netherlands) Johan Koerts	2	0
(Philippines) Juan Jose	6	6
(Brazil) Pedro Guimarães	6	6
(Austria) K Herzog	2	1

Quarterfinals
(Finland) S Carlsson	0	0
(South Africa) T Fancutt	6	6
(Philippines) J Jose	2	8	6
(Brazil) P Guimarães	6	6	2

Semifinals
(South Africa) T Fancutt	6	3	6
(Philippines) J Jose	2	6	2
