= Clare Proctor =

Australian tennis player

- Full name: Clara Harrington Proctor
- Country (sports): Australia
- Born: 6 June 1923
- Died: June 2019 (aged 96)

Singles

Grand Slam singles results
- Australian Open: QF (1948, 1951)
- Wimbledon: 3R (1951)

Doubles

Grand Slam doubles results
- Australian Open: SF (1947, 1954)
- Wimbledon: 3R (1951)

Grand Slam mixed doubles results
- Australian Open: F (1951)
- Wimbledon: 1R (1951)

Clara Harrington "Clare" Copeman (nee Proctor; 6 June 1923 – June 2019) was an Australian tennis player.

Proctor twice made the singles quarter-finals at the Australian Championships and was runner-up in the mixed doubles in 1951, partnering Jack May. She made the singles third round at her only Wimbledon appearance in 1951 and during the same European tour teamed up with Nancye Bolton to win a doubles title in Oslo.

== Grand Slam finals ==
=== Mixed doubles: 1 (0–1) ===
Result	Year	Championship	Surface	Partner	Opponents	Score
Loss	1951	Australian Championship	Grass	(Australia) Jack May	(Australia) Thelma Coyne Long (Australia) George Worthington	4–6, 6–3, 2–6
