= 1952 Wimbledon Championships =

- Date: 23 June – 5 July
- Edition: 66th
- Category: Grand Slam
- Surface: Grass
- Location: Church Road; SW19, Wimbledon, London, United Kingdom
- Venue: All England Lawn Tennis and Croquet Club

Champions

Men's singles
- (Australia) Frank Sedgman

Women's singles
- (United States) Maureen Connolly

Men's doubles
- (Australia) Ken McGregor / (Australia) Frank Sedgman

Women's doubles
- (United States) Shirley Fry / (United States) Doris Hart

Mixed doubles
- (Australia) Frank Sedgman / (United States) Doris Hart

Boys' singles
- (United Kingdom) Bobby Wilson

Girls' singles
- (Netherlands) Fenny ten Bosch
← 1951 ·	Wimbledon Championships	· 1953 →

The 1952 Wimbledon Championships took place on the outdoor grass courts at the All England Lawn Tennis and Croquet Club in Wimbledon, London, United Kingdom. The tournament was held from Monday 23 June until Saturday 5 July 1952. It was the 66th staging of the Wimbledon Championships, and the third Grand Slam tennis event of 1952. Frank Sedgman and Maureen Connolly won the singles titles.

This was the first Wimbledon tournament during the reign of Queen Elizabeth II.

== Finals ==
=== Seniors ===
==== Men's singles ====
(Australia) Frank Sedgman defeated (Egypt) Jaroslav Drobný, 4–6, 6–2, 6–3, 6–2

==== Women's singles ====
(United States) Maureen Connolly defeated (United States) Louise Brough, 7–5, 6–3

==== Men's doubles ====
(Australia) Ken McGregor / (Australia) Frank Sedgman defeated (United States) Vic Seixas / (South Africa) Eric Sturgess, 6–3, 7–5, 6–4

==== Women's doubles ====
(United States) Shirley Fry / (United States) Doris Hart defeated (United States) Louise Brough / (United States) Maureen Connolly, 8–6, 6–3

==== Mixed doubles ====
(Australia) Frank Sedgman / (United States) Doris Hart defeated (Argentina) Enrique Morea / (Australia) Thelma Long, 4–6, 6–3, 6–4

=== Juniors ===
==== Boys' singles ====
(United Kingdom) Bobby Wilson defeated (South Africa) Trevor Fancutt, 6–3, 6–3

==== Girls' singles ====
(Netherlands) Fenny ten Bosch defeated (India) Rita Davar, 5–7, 6–1, 7–5

Preceded by 1952 French Championships	Grand Slams	Succeeded by 1952 U.S. National Championships
