= 1952 Wimbledon Championships – Men's doubles =

Men's doubles
- 1952 Wimbledon Championships

Final
- Champions: (Australia) Ken McGregor (Australia) Frank Sedgman
- Runners-up: (United States) Vic Seixas (South Africa) Eric Sturgess
- Score: 6–3, 7–5, 6–4

Details
- Draw: 64 (5Q)
- Seeds: 4

Events
Singles	men	women		boys	girls
Doubles	men	women	mixed	boys	girls
- Wimbledon Championships

Ken McGregor and Frank Sedgman successfully defended their title, defeating Vic Seixas and Eric Sturgess in the final, 6–3, 7–5, 6–4 to win the gentlemen's doubles tennis title at the 1952 Wimbledon Championship.

== Seeds ==
1. (Australia) Ken McGregor / (Australia) Frank Sedgman (champions)
2. (United States) Gardnar Mulloy / (United States) Dick Savitt (third round)
3. (Egypt) Jaroslav Drobný / (United States) Budge Patty (semifinals)
4. (United States) Vic Seixas / (South Africa) Eric Sturgess (final)

Click on the seed number of a player to go to their draw section.

== Draw ==
Key

- Q = Qualifier
- WC = Wild card
- LL = Lucky loser
- Alt = Alternate
- ITF = ITF entry
- PR = Protected ranking
- SR = Special ranking
- SE = Special exempt
- JE = Junior exempt
- JR = Junior Accelerator Programme entrant
- CO = College Accelerator Programme entrant
- NG = Next Gen Accelerator Program entrant
- w/o = Walkover
- r = Retired
- d = Defaulted

=== Finals ===
Quarterfinals
1	(Australia) Ken McGregor (Australia) Frank Sedgman	6	6	3	6
(Italy) Giovanni Cucelli (Italy) Marcello del Bello	2	4	6	3
3	(Egypt) Jaroslav Drobný (United States) Budge Patty	3	6	7	8	6
(United Kingdom) Tony Mottram (United Kingdom) Geoffrey Paish	6	4	9	6	1
(Australia) Ian Ayre (United States) Ham Richardson	6	6	5	2	1
4	(United States) Vic Seixas (South Africa) Eric Sturgess	3	4	7	6	6
(Argentina) Enrique Morea (Argentina) Alejo Russell	6	3	2	7	4
(Australia) Lew Hoad (Australia) Ken Rosewall	4	6	6	5	6

Semifinals
1	(Australia) Ken McGregor (Australia) Frank Sedgman	6	6	7	6
3	(Egypt) Jaroslav Drobný (United States) Budge Patty	3	4	9	4
4	(United States) Vic Seixas (South Africa) Eric Sturgess	6	8	6	7
(Australia) Lew Hoad (Australia) Ken Rosewall	4	6	8	5

Final
1	(Australia) Ken McGregor (Australia) Frank Sedgman	6	7	6
4	(United States) Vic Seixas (South Africa) Eric Sturgess	3	5	4

=== Top half ===
==== Section 1 ====
First round
1	(Australia) Ken McGregor (Australia) Frank Sedgman	6	6	6
(Belgium) Jacques Brichant (Belgium) Philippe Washer	0	1	1
(Sweden) Torsten Johansson (Sweden) Nils Rohlsson	6	8	12
(Socialist Federal Republic of Yugoslavia) Josip Palada (Socialist Federal Republic of Yugoslavia) Vladimir Petrović	1	6	10
(United States) Herbie Flam (United States) Art Larsen	6	5	4	9	6
(South Africa) Derek Capell (South Africa) Bryan Woodroffe	4	7	6	7	4
(Republic of Ireland) Joe Hackett (Iran) Matthew Mohtadi	0	4	6	9
(Belgium) Pierre Geelhand de Merxem (Australia) Harry Hopman	6	6	1	11
(Italy) Giovanni Cucelli (Italy) Marcello del Bello	6	6	6
(United Kingdom) Edmund David (United Kingdom) Herman David	2	3	2
(Republic of Ireland) Bruce Haughton (Republic of Ireland) Jim McArdle	4	4	5
(India) Naresh Kumar (India) Narendra Nath	6	6	7
(Chile) Carlos Sanhueza (Chile) Marcelo Taverne	3	6	8	6	6
Q	(United States) Pablo Eisenberg (United States) Dick Sorlien	6	3	10	4	3
(Czechoslovakia) Milan Matouš (Italy) Rolando del Bello	6	6	4	6
(Brazil) Eugenio Saller (Brazil) Armando Vieira	2	4	6	3

Second round
1	(Australia) K McGregor (Australia) F Sedgman	6	6	6
(Sweden) T Johansson (Sweden) N Rohlsson	2	2	4
(United States) H Flam (United States) A Larsen	6	3	6	6
(Belgium) P Geelhand de Merxem (Australia) H Hopman	3	6	4	2
(Italy) G Cucelli (Italy) M del Bello	17	6	6
(India) N Kumar (India) N Nath	15	4	3
(Chile) C Sanhueza (Chile) M Taverne	2	4	3
(Czechoslovakia) M Matouš (Italy) R del Bello	6	6	6

Third round
1	(Australia) K McGregor (Australia) F Sedgman	6	3	6	10
(United States) H Flam (United States) A Larsen	0	6	4	8
(Italy) G Cucelli (Italy) M del Bello	6	6	6
(Czechoslovakia) M Matouš (Italy) R del Bello	1	4	4

Quarterfinals
1	(Australia) K McGregor (Australia) F Sedgman	6	6	3	6
(Italy) G Cucelli (Italy) M del Bello	2	4	6	3

==== Section 2 ====
First round
3	(Egypt) Jaroslav Drobný (United States) Budge Patty	6	6	6
(Italy) Vanni Canepele (Italy) Giuseppe Merlo	1	4	4
(New Zealand) Dennis Coombe (United Kingdom) Claude Lister	3	4	6	5
Q	(United Kingdom) Clive Bernstein (United Kingdom) Don Paton	6	6	4	7
(Netherlands) Ivo Rinkel (Netherlands) Hans van Swol
(United Kingdom) Headley Baxter (Italy) Fausto Gardini	w/o
(Argentina) Salvador Soriano (Argentina) Heraldo Weiss	w/o
(United Kingdom) Bernard Neal (United Kingdom) Tony Starte
(Australia) Peter Cawthorn (Australia) Don Tregonning	6	3	1	2
(United States) Irvin Dorfman (United States) Grant Golden	4	6	6	6
(Australia) Don Candy (Australia) Mervyn Rose	0	6	3	4
(United Kingdom) Tony Mottram (United Kingdom) Geoffrey Paish	6	3	6	6
Q	(United Kingdom) Billy Knight (United Kingdom) Bob Lee	6	15	2	6	6
(Australia) Phil Brophy (Dominion of Ceylon) Doug Scharenguivel	2	17	6	4	8
(United States) Harry Likas (New Zealand) Athol Tills	w/o
(United States) Gene Garrett (Poland) Władysław Skonecki

Second round
3	(Egypt) J Drobný (United States) J Patty	6	6	6
Q	(United Kingdom) C Bernstein (United Kingdom) D Paton	0	2	0
(Netherlands) I Rinkel (Netherlands) A van Swol	6	6	6
(United Kingdom) B Neal (United Kingdom) A Starte	2	4	2
(United States) I Dorfman (United States) G Golden	7	4	6	3
(United Kingdom) A Mottram (United Kingdom) G Paish	9	6	3	6
(Australia) P Brophy (Dominion of Ceylon) D Scharenguivel	3	2	6	6
(United States) W Garrett (Poland) W Skonecki	6	6	3	8

Third round
3	(Egypt) J Drobný (United States) J Patty	6	6	6
(Netherlands) I Rinkel (Netherlands) A van Swol	4	2	4
(United Kingdom) A Mottram (United Kingdom) G Paish	6	6	6
(United States) W Garrett (Poland) W Skonecki	2	2	4

Quarterfinals
3	(Egypt) J Drobný (United States) J Patty	3	6	7	8	6
(United Kingdom) A Mottram (United Kingdom) G Paish	6	4	9	6	1

=== Bottom half ===
==== Section 3 ====
First round
(West Germany) Ernst Buchholz (West Germany) Horst Hermann	6	6	6
(Socialist Federal Republic of Yugoslavia) Milan Branović (Socialist Federal Republic of Yugoslavia) Dragutin Mitić	4	3	2
(United Kingdom) Colin Hannam (United Kingdom) John Horn	3	4	6	6	10
(United Kingdom) Derek Bull (United Kingdom) Stan Clark	6	6	4	4	8
Q	(Hong Kong) Ip Koon Hung (Hong Kong) Edwin Tsai	6	6	6
(United Kingdom) David Anderton (United Kingdom) Jeffrey Michelmore	2	0	2
(Australia) Ian Ayre (United States) Ham Richardson	2	7	17	7
(Austria) Freddie Huber (Austria) Hans Redl	6	5	15	5
(United States) Steve Potts (Austria) Gustav Specht	6	3	6	4
(Philippines) Felicisimo Ampon (United States) Straight Clark	8	6	4	6
(South Africa) Nigel Cockburn (South Africa) Leon Norgarb	6	6	5	6
(Belgium) Jean Moreau (Belgium) Jacques Peten	2	1	7	4
(Poland) Czesław Spychała (Poland) Ignacy Tłoczyński	2	4	2
(United Kingdom) Roger Becker (United Kingdom) Gerry Oakley	6	6	6
Q	(United Kingdom) Cliff Hovell (United Kingdom) Howard Walton	1	3	3
4	(United States) Vic Seixas (South Africa) Eric Sturgess	6	6	6

Second round
(West Germany) E Buchholz (West Germany) H Hermann	7	6	6
(United Kingdom) C Hannam (United Kingdom) J Horn	5	4	3
(Hong Kong) K-H Ip (Hong Kong) E Tsai	4	8	6	3	6
(Australia) I Ayre (United States) H Richardson	6	6	3	6	8
(Philippines) F Ampon (United States) S Clark	10	6	6
(South Africa) N Cockburn (South Africa) L Norgarb	8	3	0
(United Kingdom) R Becker (United Kingdom) G Oakley	4	6	7
4	(United States) V Seixas (South Africa) E Sturgess	6	8	9

Third round
(West Germany) E Buchholz (West Germany) H Hermann	6	3	4	5
(Australia) I Ayre (United States) H Richardson	4	6	6	7
(Philippines) F Ampon (United States) S Clark	4	4	6	4
4	(United States) V Seixas (South Africa) E Sturgess	6	6	3	6

Quarterfinals
(Australia) I Ayre (United States) H Richardson	6	6	5	2	1
4	(United States) V Seixas (South Africa) E Sturgess	3	4	7	6	6

==== Section 4 ====
First round
(France) Robert Haillet (France) Jean-Claude Molinari	6	6	10
(Switzerland) Henri Paul Brechbuhl (Switzerland) Jost Spitzer	2	2	8
(Republic of Ireland) Guy Jackson (Republic of Ireland) Cyril Kemp	6	6	8
(Brazil) José Agüero (Brazil) Pedro Guimarães	0	2	6
(Argentina) Enrique Morea (Argentina) Alejo Russell	6	6	6
(Chile) Luis Ayala (Chile) Ricardo Balbiers	1	4	4
(Denmark) Kurt Nielsen (Denmark) Torben Ulrich	6	6	6
(United Kingdom) Malcolm Gracie (United Kingdom) Ivor Warwick	4	4	4
(Spain) Jaime Bartrolí (Finland) Sakari Salo	6	5	3	6	1
(United Kingdom) Henry Billington (United Kingdom) Don Butler	4	7	6	4	6
(Sweden) Ulf Schmidt (Sweden) Staffan Stockenberg	0	3	7	4
(Australia) Lew Hoad (Australia) Ken Rosewall	6	6	5	6
(France) Jean Borotra (France) Bernard Destremau	6	6	4	6
(Southern Rhodesia) Cecil Irvine (Southern Rhodesia) Basil Katz	4	3	6	3
(South Africa) Trevor Fancutt (South Africa) Owen Williams	3	4	3
2	(United States) Gardnar Mulloy (United States) Dick Savitt	6	6	6

Second round
(France) R Haillet (France) J-C Molinari	6	11	7	1	6
(Republic of Ireland) G Jackson (Republic of Ireland) C Kemp	1	13	5	6	1
(Argentina) E Morea (Argentina) A Russell	12	11	7	6
(Denmark) K Nielsen (Denmark) T Ulrich	10	9	9	4
(United Kingdom) H Billington (United Kingdom) D Butler	3	1	2
(Australia) L Hoad (Australia) K Rosewall	6	6	6
(France) J Borotra (France) B Destremau	3	5	7	1
2	(United States) G Mulloy (United States) R Savitt	6	7	5	6

Third round
(France) R Haillet (France) J-C Molinari	2	2	2
(Argentina) E Morea (Argentina) A Russell	6	6	6
(Australia) L Hoad (Australia) K Rosewall	6	8	1	3	7
2	(United States) G Mulloy (United States) R Savitt	4	6	6	6	5

Quarterfinals
(Argentina) E Morea (Argentina) A Russell	6	3	2	7	4
(Australia) L Hoad (Australia) K Rosewall	4	6	6	5	6
