= 1951 Australian Championships – Women's singles =

Women's singles
- 1951 Australian Championships

Final
- Champion: (Australia) Nancye Bolton
- Runner-up: (Australia) Thelma Long
- Score: 6–1, 7–5

Details
- Draw: 32
- Seeds: 8

Events
Singles	men	women
Doubles	men	women
- Australian Championships

First-seeded Nancye Bolton defeated Thelma Long 6–1, 7–5 in the final to win the women's singles tennis title at the 1951 Australian Championships.

== Seeds ==
The seeded players are listed below. Nancye Bolton is the champion; others show the round in which they were eliminated.

1. (Australia) Nancye Bolton (champion)
2. (Australia) Joyce Fitch (semifinals)
3. (Australia) Thelma Long (finalist)
4. (Australia) Mary Hawton (quarterfinals)
5. (Australia) Esme Ashford (semifinals)
6. (Australia) Nell Hopman (quarterfinals)
7. (Australia) Sadie Newcombe (second round)
8. (Australia) Beryl Penrose (quarterfinals)

== Draw ==
=== Key ===
- Q = Qualifier
- WC = Wild card
- LL = Lucky loser
- r = Retired

=== Finals ===
Quarterfinals
1	(Australia) Nancye Bolton	8	6
8	(Australia) Beryl Penrose	6	2
4	(Australia) Mary Hawton	1	6	3
5	(Australia) Esme Ashford	6	4	6
6	(Australia) Nell Hopman	2	1
3	(Australia) Thelma Long	6	6
(Australia) Clare Proctor	6	1	3
2	(Australia) Joyce Fitch	4	6	6

Semifinals
1	(Australia) Nancye Bolton	6	6
5	(Australia) Esme Ashford	1	0
3	(Australia) Thelma Long	6	6	6
2	(Australia) Joyce Fitch	8	4	2

Finals
1	(Australia) Nancye Bolton	6	7
3	(Australia) Thelma Long	1	5

=== Earlier rounds ===
==== Section 1 ====
First round
1	(Australia) Bolton	6	6
(Australia) Edmondson	1	0
(Australia) Hattersley	6	6
(Australia) Colyer	2	0
8	(Australia) Penrose	7	6
(Australia) Martin	5	3
(Australia) Angwin	3	6	6
(Australia) Mills	6	3	1
4	(Australia) Hawton	6	6
(Australia) Taylor	3	3
(Australia) Thiele	6	8
(Australia) Clarke	3	6
5	(Australia) Ashford	6	6
(Australia) Cunningham	1	0
(Australia) Parker	7	5	6
(Australia) Southcombe	5	7	1

Second round
1	(Australia) Bolton	6	6
(Australia) Hattersley	1	2
8	(Australia) Penrose	2	6	6
(Australia) Angwin	6	4	1
4	(Australia) Hawton	6	6
(Australia) Thiele	4	2
5	(Australia) Ashford	6	6
(Australia) Parker	2	4

Quarterfinals
1	(Australia) Bolton	8	6
8	(Australia) Penrose	6	2
4	(Australia) Hawton	6	4	6
5	(Australia) Ashford	1	6	3

Semifinals
1	(Australia) Bolton	6	6
5	(Australia) Ashford	1	0

==== Section 2 ====
First round
(Australia) Astley	6	4	6
(Australia) Fogarty	4	6	1
6	(Australia) Hopman	6	6
(Australia) Spehr-Jones	3	2
(Australia) Ashford	6	6
(Australia) McIntyre	2	0
3	(Australia) Long	6	6
(Australia) Morris	1	0
(Australia) Proctor	6	6
(Australia) Schultz	4	2
7	(Australia) Newcombe	0	3
(Australia) Wallis	6	6
(Australia) Hardingham	6	6
(Australia) Bryant	3	4

Second round
(Australia) Astley	2	2
6	(Australia) Hopman	6	6
(Australia) Ashford	2	4
3	(Australia) Long	6	6
(Australia) Proctor	6	6
7	(Australia) Wallis	2	4
(Australia) Hardingham	6	0
2	(Australia) Fitch	8	6

Quarterfinals
6	(Australia) Hopman	2	1
3	(Australia) Long	6	6
(Australia) Proctor	6	1	3
2	(Australia) Fitch	4	6	6

Semifinals
3	(Australia) Long	6	6	6
2	(Australia) Fitch	8	4	2

Preceded by 1950 U.S. National Championships – Women's singles	Grand Slam women's singles	Succeeded by 1951 French Championships – Women's singles
