= Peter Cawthorn =

Australian tennis player

- Full name: John William Peter Cawthorn
- Country (sports): AUS
- Born: 17 February 1931 Melbourne, Australia
- Died: 1999 (age 68) Melbourne, Australia
- Turned pro: 1949 (amateur tour); 1953 (pro tour)
- Retired: 1968

Singles
- Career titles: 21

Grand Slam singles results
- Australian Open: 2R (1950)
- Wimbledon: 1R (1951)

Other tournaments
- Wembley Pro: QF (1957, 1958)
- French Pro: QF (1956)

Grand Slam doubles results
- Wimbledon: 3R (1951)

Grand Slam mixed doubles results
- Wimbledon: 4R (1952)

John William Peter Cawthorn (17 February 1931 – 1999) was an Australian amateur tennis player who later turned professional in 1953. As an amateur he competed at the 1950 Australian Championships and the 1951 Wimbledon Championships. As a professional he was a two time quarter finalist at the Wembley Professional Championships in 1957 and 1958, and a quarter finalist at the French Professional Championship in 1956. He was active from 1949 to 1968 and won 21 career amateur and pro singles titles. He later became a tennis coach.

== Tennis career ==
Amateur

Cawthorn was born in Melbourne, Australia in 1931. In the 1940s he was educated at Box Hill High School, where he became captain of the football, tennis and swimming teams.

He played his first senior tournament in 1949 at the New South Wales Hard Court Championships where he reached the quarter finals. He then competed in Australian state and national tournaments over the next two years. In 1950 he played at the Australian Championships where he lost in the second round to George Worthington. In 1951 he left Australia to play on the international ILTF Circuit After he arrived in England he played at the South Shore Open in Blackpool where he won the title against Pakistan's Adel Ismail. Cawthorn mainly played at leading regional tournaments in England throughout 1951.

That year he won the singles titles at the Welsh Championships, Sutton Coldfield Hard Courts Championship, Ulster Grass Court Championships, Bedford Open, Cumberland Hard Court Championships and the Moseley Championship. In July 1951 he took part in the Wimbledon Championships, but lost in the second round to French player Paul Rémy.

In 1952 Cawthorn won eight titles including the Cinque Ports Championships, Cumberland Hard Court Championships, Sutton Coldfield Hard Courts, East Gloucestershire Championships, Havant Open, Worthing Hard Courts, Hull Open and Worthing Open. He also competed at 1952 Wimbledon Championships, where he was in the top half of the draw, but lost in the first round to the American player Harry Likas. Additionally he was also losing finalist at the Cumberland Hard Court Championships and Pakistan International Championships in 1951, and the West Sussex Championships in 1952.

Professional

In 1953 Cawthorn turned professional and played his first tournament at the Slazenger Pro Championships in Scarborough, England, where he reached the quarter finals before losing to Frank Sedgman. He won multiple pro titles including the Slazenger Pro Championships three times in 1954, 1956 and 1960 and the German Pro International Championships four times consecutivley from 1959 to 1962. In 1961 whilst on the Pro tour he was hired by the Tennis Club of Rochester in the United States as their resident pro coach.

In major professional tournaments of the time he was a two time quarter finalist at the Wembley Professional Championships in 1957 and 1958, and a quarter finalist in singles at the French Professional Championship in 1956, and a semi-finalist in the men's doubles partnering Tony Mottram.

Coaching

During his amateur period he was hired as a short term coach for the Irish and Pakistan Davis Cup teamsvarious Davis Cup teams in 1955, the Spanish, Irish and Dutch teams in 1956, and Dutch and German teams in 1958. Additionally he was also hired as a tennis coach for the Rochester Country Club in 1958 in Rochester, New Hampshire, United States that lasted into his professional career and beyond til 1983. In 1961 whilst on the Pro tour he was hired by the Tennis Club of Rochester in Pittsford, NY the United States as their resident pro coach.

== Singles titles (21) ==
=== Amateur (14) ===
Result	No.	Date	Tournament	Location	Surface	Opponent	Score
Amateur titles
Win	1.	1951	Welsh Championships	Newport	Grass	(India) Naresh Kumar	2–6, 6–2, 6–3
Win	2.	1951	Sutton Coldfield Hard Courts Championship	Sutton Coldfield	Clay	(Poland) Ignacy Tloczynski	6–2, 8–10, 6–3
Win	3.	1951	Ulster Grass Court Championships	Belfast	Grass	(Australia) Albert Hartley Maggs	4–6, 6–0, 6–0
Win	4.	1951	South Shore Open	Blackpool	Grass	(Pakistan) Adel Ismail	6–2, 6–4
Win	5.	1951	Bedford Open	Bedford	Grass	(United Kingdom) Dick Guise	6–0, 6–3
Win	6.	1951	Moseley Championship	Moseley	Grass	(South Africa) Owen Williams	6–2, 6–2
Win	7.	1952	Cinque Ports Championships	Folkestone	Grass	(United Kingdom) Derrick Layland	6–1, 6–1
Win	8.	1952	Cumberland Hard Court Championships	Hampstead	Clay	(United Kingdom) Gerry Oakley	6–3, 6–1
Win	9.	1952	Sutton Coldfield Hard Courts Championship (2)	Sutton Coldfield	Clay	(Australia) Don Tregonning	6–4, 6–4
Win	10.	1952	East Gloucestershire Championships	Cheltenham	Grass	(Southern Rhodesia) Basil Katz	6–0, 6–3
Win	11.	1952	Havant Open	Havant	Grass	(United Kingdom) Bill Threlfall	6–1, 4–6, 6–2
Win	12.	1952.	Worthing Hard Courts	Worthing	Clay	(Sweden) Bosse Andersson	6–3, 6–2
Win	13.	1952	Hull Open	Kingston upon Hull	Grass	(United States) Stephen Potts	6–2, 7–5
Win	14.	1952	Worthing Open	Worthing	Grass	(United Kingdom) Erik Bullmer	6–2, 8–10, 6–4

=== Professional (7) ===
Result	No.	Date	Tournament	Location	Surface	Opponent	Score
Professional titles
Win	1.	1954	Slazenger Pro Championships	Scarborough	Grass	(United Kingdom) Paddy Roberts	6–4, 7–5, 7–5
Win	2.	1956	Slazenger Pro Championships (2)	Eastbourne	Grass	(Egypt) Salem Khaled	6–0, 6–4, 6–3
Win	3.	1959	German Pro International Championships	Bad Ems	Clay	(Australia) Peter Malloy	6–0, 4–6, 6–0, 3–6, 6–3
Win	4.	1960	German Pro International Championships (2)	Bad Ems	Clay	(Australia) Peter Malloy	6–1, 6–1, 6–3
Win	5.	1960	Slazenger Pro Championships (3)	Eastbourne	Grass	(Australia) George Worthington	10–8, 6–3, 6–4
Win	6.	1961	German Pro International Championships (3)	Bad Ems	Clay	(West Germany) Rupert Huber	6–2, 4–6, 7–5, 1–6, 6–3
Win	7.	1962	German Pro International Championships (4)	Bad Ems	Clay	(West Germany) Rupert Huber	6–2, 6–2, 6–0

== Family ==
Cawthorn announced his engagement to the English tennis player Lorna Cornell in January 1953, and they married on 18 February 1953 in Kensington, London. They had three children but later divorced.
