= Jack May (tennis) =

Australian tennis player (John Bernard May; 1925–2012)

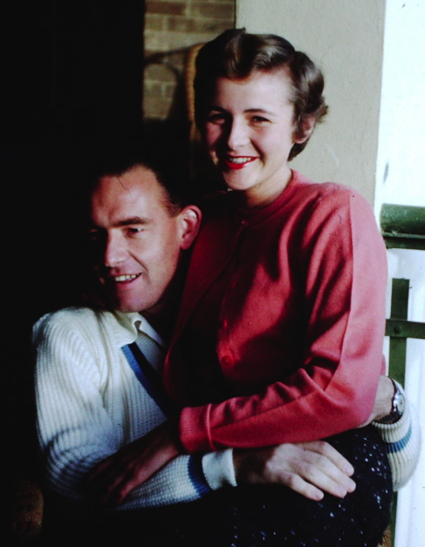
- Country (sports): Australia
- Residence: Sydney - Melbourne
- Born: 17 November 1925
- Died: 10 August 2012 (aged 86)

Grand Slam mixed doubles results
- Australian Open: F (1951)

John "Jack" Bernard May (17 November 1925 – 10 August 2012) was an amateur tennis player who won over 200 tennis titles in Australia.

== History ==
May played many sports, but his favorite and best was tennis. One of his more important achievements was to reach the mixed doubles final of the 1951 Australian Championship.

He was trained and practiced as a dental technician, and May became an employee of Spalding Australia (A.G Spalding). He grew Spalding from a small supplier to its becoming a big manufacturer, especially in golf ball production.

In 1965, he and his family moved from Sydney to Melbourne (Spalding Head Office) where he remained for the rest of his life. He purchased the Sherrin Football Company in 1972, which manufactured AFL footballs in agreement with Tom Sherrin (Sherrin’s owner).

May improved Spalding’s overall performance and market share in the large golfing market. Hot Dot and Top Flite golf balls became big sellers and took Spalding’s market share from under 20% to almost 70%. Spalding asked Jack to move to Canada with the intention of moving him to the U.S., but Jack’s family decided to remain in Australia, so he turned down the offer.

In his 1979 autobiography, Jack Kramer recalled that he saw May play in Australia. Unaware of who he was but impressed with his skills, he asked who was on the court. Kramer was told he is "just a weekend player", and Kramer said "he must be the best weekend player in the world".

== Achievements ==
- Over 200 Tennis titles in Australia (recorded wins over Don Candy, Ken Rosewall, Frank Sedgman and John Newcombe)
- Won Sydney Singles Championship 13 times
- Won Sydney Doubles Championship 11 times
- Won Northern Suburbs Singles 11 times
- Won Northern Suburbs Doubles 10 times

=== Grand Slam finals ===
Result	Year	Championship	Surface	Partner	Opponents	Score
Loss	1951	Australian Championship	Grass	(Australia) Clare Proctor	(Australia) Thelma Coyne Long (Australia) George Worthington	4–6, 6–3, 2–6

== Honours ==
- Life Member of the Australian Davis Cup Federation and President for 25 years.
- Tennis Australia National Award for Services to the Game
- Councillor of the Victorian Tennis Association. Awarded with Highly Commended Service Award in 1986 and Victorian Spirit of Tennis Award in 1999.

== Private life ==
Jack was married to Patricia May (Everitt) on 3 August 1957. They had four children: Michelle, Jon, Martin and Rod.
