= Slazenger Pro Championships =

Former English tennis tournament

Defunct tennis tournament
- Event name: Slazenger Pro Championships
- Tour: Pro tour
- Founded: 1946
- Abolished: 1964
- Editions: 19
- Location: Scarborough; Eastbourne; England
- Surface: Grass

The Slazenger Pro Championships is a defunct men's professional tennis tournament that was played on outdoor grass courts from 1946 to 1964. It featured both singles and doubles competitions.

== History ==
The tournament was staged at two locations in England: first in Scarborough, North Yorkshire (1946–1955 & 1957) and later in Eastbourne, East Sussex (1955–1956, 1958–1964).

== Finals ==
Year	Location	Surface	Winner	Runner-up	Score
1946	Scarborough	Grass	(United Kingdom) Dan Maskell	(United Kingdom) J. W. Pearce	6–1, 7–5, 6–1
1947	Scarborough	Grass	(United Kingdom) Dan Maskell (2)	(United Kingdom) J. W. Pearce	6–2, 6–2, 7–5
1948	Scarborough	Grass	(United Kingdom) Fred Perry	(France) Yvon Petra	3–6, 6–4, 6–2, 6–1
1949	Scarborough	Grass	(United States) Jack Kramer	(United States) Don Budge	4–6, 7–5, 6–2, 6–4
1950	Scarborough	Grass	(United Kingdom) Fred Perry (2)	(Egypt) Salem Khaled	6–3, 2–6, 6–3, 6–3
1951	Scarborough	Grass	(United Kingdom) Fred Perry (3)	(Italy) Francesco Romanoni	6–2, 6–4, 6–3
1952	Scarborough	Grass	(United States) Pancho Gonzales	(Ecuador) Pancho Segura	15-13, 6–3, 6–3
1953	Scarborough	Grass	(Ecuador) Pancho Segura	(Australia) Frank Sedgman	2–6, 6–4, 3–6, 6–4, 8–6
1954	Scarborough	Grass	(Australia) Peter Cawthorn	(United Kingdom) Arthur Gordon Roberts	6–4, 7–5, 7–5
1955	Eastbourne	Grass	(United States) Pancho Gonzales (2)	(United States) Pancho Segura	6–2, 7–5, 8–6
1956	Eastbourne	Grass	(Australia) Peter Cawthorn (2)	(Egypt) Salem Khaled	6–0, 6–4, 6–3
1957	Scarborough	Grass	(Australia) George Worthington	(Australia) Peter Cawthorn	6–8, 3–6, 8–6, 6–3, 6–2
1958	Eastbourne	Grass	(Australia) Ken Rosewall	(United States) Tony Trabert	6–0, 6–2, 6–8, 2–6, 7–5
1959	Eastbourne	Grass	(Australia) Ashley Cooper	(Australia) Lew Hoad	9-11, 4–6, 6–1, 6–4, 6–0
1960	Eastbourne	Grass	(Australia) Peter Cawthorn (3)	(Australia) George Worthington	10-8, 6–3, 6–4
1961	Eastbourne	Grass	(United Kingdom) Mike Davies	(Australia) Peter Cawthorn	6–1, 6–1, 6–4
1962	Eastbourne	Grass	(Australia) George Worthington (2)	(United Kingdom) Mike Davies	6–3, 6–2, 3–6, 8–6
1963	Eastbourne	Grass	(United Kingdom) Roger Becker	(Australia) Peter Cawthorn	4–6, 6–1, 4–6, 6–4, 7–5
1964	Eastbourne	Grass	(United Kingdom) Roger Becker (2)	(Australia) Peter Cawthorn	6–4, 6–8, 4–6, 8–6, 6–2

== Tournament records ==
- Most singles titles: (United Kingdom) Fred Perry & (Australia) Peter Cawthorn (3)
- Most singles finals: (Australia) Peter Cawthorn (7)
