= 1951 Australian Championships – Men's singles =

Men's singles
- 1951 Australian Championships

Final
- Champion: (United States) Dick Savitt
- Runner-up: (Australia) Ken McGregor
- Score: 6–3, 2–6, 6–3, 6–1

Details
- Draw: 32
- Seeds: 10

Events
Singles	men	women
Doubles	men	women
- Australian Championships

Fourth-seeded Dick Savitt defeated Ken McGregor 6–3, 2–6, 6–3, 6–1 in the final to win the men's singles tennis title at the 1951 Australian Championships.

== Seeds ==
The seeded players are listed below. Dick Savitt is the champion; others show the round in which they were eliminated.

1. (Australia) Frank Sedgman (semifinals)
2. (United States) Arthur Larsen (semifinals)
3. (Australia) Ken McGregor (finalist)
4. (United States) Dick Savitt (champion)
5. n/a
6. (Australia) John Bromwich (quarterfinals)
7. (Australia) Bill Sidwell (second round)
8. (Australia) George Worthington (quarterfinals)
9. (Australia) Adrian Quist (quarterfinals)
10. (Australia) Don Candy (second round)

== Draw ==
=== Key ===
- Q = Qualifier
- WC = Wild card
- LL = Lucky loser
- r = Retired

=== Finals ===
Quarterfinals
1	(Australia) Frank Sedgman	6	7	6
8	(Australia) George Worthington	2	5	0
6	(Australia) John Bromwich	4	3	1
4	(United States) Dick Savitt	6	6	6
3	(Australia) Ken McGregor	8	6	7
9	(Australia) Adrian Quist	6	2	5
7	(Australia) Mervyn Rose	2	6	7	4	2
2	(United States) Arthur Larsen	6	3	5	6	6

Semifinals
1	(Australia) Frank Sedgman	6	5	6	3	4
4	(United States) Dick Savitt	2	7	1	6	6
3	(Australia) Ken McGregor	11	6	5	6
2	(United States) Arthur Larsen	9	2	7	1

Final
4	(United States) Dick Savitt	6	2	6	6
3	(Australia) Ken McGregor	3	6	3	1

=== Earlier rounds ===
==== Section 1 ====
First round
1	(Australia) Sedgman	8	6	6
(Australia) Mehaffey	6	1	1
(Australia) Hoad	6	6	6
(New Zealand) McKenzie	3	0	0
8	(Australia) Worthington	6	6	6
(Australia) Rocavert	2	4	4
(New Zealand) Barry	6	6	11
(Australia) Rosewall	3	4	9
6	(Australia) Bromwich	6	6	6
(Australia) Stewart	3	0	0
(Australia) Hartwig	6	11	7
(Australia) Crawford	4	9	5
10	(Australia) Candy	6	7	4	7
(Australia) O'Brien	3	5	6	5
4	(United States) Savitt	6	6	6
(Australia) Green	3	1	3

Second round
1	(Australia) Sedgman	6	6	6
(Australia) Hoad	3	4	4
8	(Australia) Worthington	6	3	6	7
(New Zealand) Barry	4	6	1	5
6	(Australia) Bromwich	0	6	6	6
(Australia) Hartwig	6	3	2	1
10	(Australia) Candy	1	3	11	0
4	(United States) Savitt	6	6	9	6

Quarterfinals
1	(Australia) Sedgman	6	7	6
8	(Australia) Worthington	2	5	0
6	(Australia) Bromwich	6	6	6
4	(United States) Savitt	4	3	1

Semifinals
1	(Australia) Sedgman	6	5	6	3	4
4	(United States) Savitt	2	7	1	6	6

==== Section 2 ====
First round
3	(Australia) McGregor	5	6	6	7
(Australia) McCarthy	7	4	1	5
(Australia) Wilderspin	4	6	6	6
(New Zealand) Robson	6	1	3	3
9	(Australia) Quist	6	6	6
(Australia) Brophy	3	2	2
(Australia) Gilchrist	3	7	6	6
(Australia) Strohfeldt	6	5	4	4
7	(Australia) Rose	6	6	6
(Australia) Way	0	0	3
(Australia) Hopman	7	6	6
(Australia) Ayre	5	1	3
7	(Australia) Sidwell	6	6	6
(New Zealand) Otway	0	2	1
2	(United States) Larsen	6	6	6
(Australia) Alle	1	1	3

Second round
3	(Australia) McGregor	8	6	6
(Australia) Wilderspin	6	1	1
9	(Australia) Quist	6	6	6
(Australia) Gilchrist	3	4	3
7	(Australia) Rose	6	2	6	6
(Australia) Hopman	1	6	2	4
7	(Australia) Sidwell	7	2	4	6	1
2	(United States) Larsen	5	6	6	3	6

Quarterfinals
3	(Australia) McGregor	8	6	7
9	(Australia) Quist	6	2	5
7	(Australia) Rose	6	3	5	6	6
2	(United States) Larsen	2	6	7	4	2

Semifinals
3	(Australia) McGregor	11	6	5	6
2	(United States) Larsen	9	2	7	1

Preceded by 1950 U.S. National Championships	Grand Slam men's singles	Succeeded by 1951 French Championships
