= 1951 Australian Championships =

- Date: 20–31 January 1951
- Edition: 39th
- Category: Grand Slam (ITF)
- Surface: Grass
- Location: Sydney, Australia
- Venue: White City Tennis Club

Champions

Men's singles
- (United States) Dick Savitt

Women's singles
- (Australia) Nancye Wynne Bolton

Men's doubles
- (Australia) Ken McGregor / (Australia) Frank Sedgman

Women's doubles
- (Australia) Thelma Coyne Long / (Australia) Nancye Wynne Bolton

Mixed doubles
- (Australia) Thelma Coyne Long / (Australia) George Worthington
- Australian Championships

The 1951 Australian Championships was a tennis tournament that took place on outdoor Grass courts at the White City Tennis Club, Sydney, Australia from 20 January to 31 January. It was the 39th edition of the Australian Championships (now known as the Australian Open), the 11th held in Sydney, and the first Grand Slam tournament of the year. The singles titles were won by American Dick Savitt and Australian Nancye Wynne Bolton.

== Finals ==
=== Men's singles ===
(United States) Dick Savitt defeated (Australia) Ken McGregor 6–3, 2–6, 6–3, 6–1

=== Women's singles ===
(Australia) Nancye Wynne Bolton defeated (Australia) Thelma Coyne Long 6–1, 7–5

=== Men's doubles ===
(Australia) Ken McGregor / (Australia) Frank Sedgman defeated (Australia) John Bromwich / (Australia) Adrian Quist 11–9, 2–6, 6–3, 4–6, 6–3

=== Women's doubles ===
(Australia) Thelma Coyne Long / (Australia) Nancye Wynne Bolton defeated (Australia) Joyce Fitch / (Australia) Mary Bevis Hawton 6–2, 6–1

=== Mixed doubles ===
(Australia) Thelma Coyne Long / (Australia) George Worthington defeated (Australia) Clare Proctor / (Australia) Jack May 6–4, 6–3

Preceded by 1950 U.S. National Championships	Grand Slams	Succeeded by 1951 French Championships
