= 1952 Wimbledon Championships – Girls' singles =

1952 Wimbledon Championships

Girls' singles
- 1952 Wimbledon Championships

Final
- Champion: (Netherlands) Fenny ten Bosch
- Runner-up: (India) Rita Davar
- Score: 5–7, 6–1, 7–5

Details
- Draw: 12

Events
| Singles | men | women | | boys | girls |
| Doubles | men | women | mixed | boys | girls |
| ← 1951 · | Wimbledon Championships | · 1953 → |

Fenny ten Bosch defeated Rita Davar in the final, 5–7, 6–1, 7–5 to win the girls' singles tennis title at the 1952 Wimbledon Championships.

== Draw ==
=== Key ===
- Q = Qualifier
- WC = Wild card
- LL = Lucky loser
- Alt = Alternate
- SE = Special exempt
- PR = Protected ranking
- ITF = ITF entry
- JE = Junior exempt
- w/o = Walkover
- r = Retired
- d = Defaulted
- SR = Special ranking

=== Draw ===
First round
(France) Annie Soisbault | 6 | 6
(Republic of Ireland) R Binchey | 2 | 1
(Switzerland) Janine Bourgnon | 6 | 6
(Denmark) T Knutsen | 4 | 4
(Denmark) B Nielsen | 6 | 6
(Greece) SN Dimitriadis | 0 | 0
(Netherlands) Fenny ten Bosch | 6 | 6 | 6
(West Germany) Margot Dittmeyer | 1 | 8 | 3

Quarterfinals
(Belgium) C Maes | 2 | 1
(India) Rita Davar | 6 | 6
(France) Annie Soisbault | 6 | 6
(Switzerland) Janine Bourgnon | 4 | 0
(Denmark) B Nielsen | 0 | 1
(Netherlands) Fenny ten Bosch | 6 | 6
(United Kingdom) Valerie Pitt | 6 | 6
(Austria) E Biermayer | 0 | 3

Semifinals
(India) Rita Davar | 6 | 6
(France) Annie Soisbault | 4 | 2
(Netherlands) Fenny ten Bosch | 6 | 6
(United Kingdom) Valerie Pitt | 2 | 2

Final
(India) Rita Davar | 7 | 1 | 5
(Netherlands) Fenny ten Bosch | 5 | 6 | 7
