= Annie Soisbault =

French tennis player and motorsports driver

Annie Blanche Marie Soisbault de Montaigu (born 18 June 1934 in Paris - died 18 September 2012 in Paris) was a French tennis player and motorsports driver.

Soisbault's early success came in tennis and she reached the semifinals of the Wimbledon 1952 Jr. Tournament, however it did not pay as well as racing did in the 1950s. By the time she was in her early 20s, Soisbault had purchased her first two cars: a Delahaye Grand Sport and a Triumph TR3. In that same year she was a backup driver in the 1956 Monte Carlo Rally. She was considered one of the finest women racers in the 1950s and 60s. She won the 1963 Tour Auto Ladies' Cup and in 1966, she was the first woman who averaged more than 100 km/h driving a Porsche 906 at Mont Ventoux.

She is buried in Paris at Père Lachaise.
