= Arvilla McGuire =

American tennis player

- Full name: Arvilla McGuire Manning
- Country (sports): United States
- Born: March 26, 1928
- Died: August 17, 2013 (aged 85)

Singles

Grand Slam singles results
- French Open: 3R (1952)
- Wimbledon: 3R (1949, 1951)
- US Open: 2R (1946)

Doubles

Grand Slam doubles results
- French Open: QF (1952)
- Wimbledon: 3R (1952)

Grand Slam mixed doubles results
- French Open: QF (1952)
- Wimbledon: 3R (1951, 1955)

Arvilla McGuire Manning (March 26, 1928 – August 17, 2013) was an American tennis player.

A native of Piedmont, California, McGuire ranked number one in the state for the 14s age division and was sixth in the United States for the 18s. She competed in four editions of the Wimbledon Championships, reaching the singles third round twice. In 1951 she was runner-up to Betty Lombard at the Irish Championships.

McGuire married Edward M. Manning, Jr. in 1956 and they had two sons.
