= Doug Scharenguivel =

- Full name: Douglas Herman Scharenguivel
- Country (sports): Ceylon
- Born: 23 July 1918 Ceylon
- Died: 10 July 1995 (aged 76) Bristol, England

Singles
- Career titles: 9

Grand Slam singles results
- Wimbledon: 2R (1950, 1952, 1954)

Grand Slam doubles results
- Wimbledon: 2R (1951, 1952, 1953)

Grand Slam mixed doubles results
- Wimbledon: 3R (1951)

Douglas Herman Scharenguivel (23 July 1918 — 10 July 1995) was a British-Sri Lankan tennis player.

Scharenguivel grew up in what was then British Ceylon, where he was a junior tennis champion. Post-war he moved to Bristol to complete his studies and found work as a civil engineer, living during this time in the town of Filton.

A Gloucestershire county captain, Scharenguivel reached the singles second round at Wimbledon on three occasions, was a two-time Exmouth Open singles champion and won the West of England Championships in doubles. He won the singles title at the Bath Open, every year from 1947 to 1952. In 1953 he was called up to the Ceylon Davis Cup team for the country's debut tournament appearance and played a tie against the Netherlands in Scheveningen.
