= Susan Partridge (tennis) =

British tennis player

- Full name: Joan Susan Vernon Partridge
- Country (sports): Great Britain; France
- Born: 12 September 1930; Wellington, Shropshire, England
- Died: 4 December 1999 (aged 69); Neuilly-sur-Seine, Hauts-de-Seine; France

Singles

Grand Slam singles results
- French Open: QF (1953)
- Wimbledon: 4R (1952, 1955)

Doubles

Grand Slam doubles results
- French Open: QF (1955)
- Wimbledon: SF (1952)

Grand Slam mixed doubles results
- French Open: 3R (1952)
- Wimbledon: 4R (1952, 1957, 1958, 1960)

Joan Susan Vernon Partridge (12 September 1930 – 4 December 1999) was a British tennis player.

== Biography ==
Partridge, born in Shropshire, was the junior Wimbledon runner-up in 1949, before going on to compete with success internationally during the 1950s and 1960s.

A British Wightman Cup player in 1952, Partridge switched to representing France following her 1953 marriage to tennis player Philippe Chatrier, from who she later divorced.

One of her best performances was at the 1952 Wimbledon Championships, where she troubled the second-seeded Maureen Connolly in the round of 16, going down 5–7 in the third set. She also reached the semi-finals of the women's doubles, partnering Jean Rinkel-Quertier.

In 1953, competing as Sue Chatrier, she won France's national championships and was a singles quarter-finalist at Roland Garros, again pushing Connolly to three sets.
