= Viola White (tennis) =

British field hockey and tennis player

- Full name: Viola Steeds White Cameron
- Country (sports): United Kingdom
- Born: 20 March 1917 Wiltshire, England
- Died: 25 July 2006 (aged 89) Winchester, England

Singles

Grand Slam singles results
- Wimbledon: 4R (1952)

Doubles

Grand Slam doubles results
- Wimbledon: QF (1951, 1952, 1953)

Grand Slam mixed doubles results
- Wimbledon: 3R (1953, 1957)

Viola Steeds Cameron (nee White; 20 March 1917 – 25 July 2006) was a British field hockey and tennis player.

Born and raised in Wiltshire, White lived on the family farm in Zeals. Locally she captained the Wiltshire country team and was a six-time singles champion at Winchester.

White was a regular in the Wimbledon draw from 1947 to 1961, reaching three women's doubles quarter-finals with Mary Eyre. She made the singles fourth round at Wimbledon in 1952 and captained England that year against Wales.

As a field hockey player, White was good enough to go on a tour to South Africa with the national team in 1950. She scored four times in a tour match against an International Wanders team, for which she was singled out for praise in the Johannesburg Star newspaper for her control and footwork.
