= Billie Woodgate =

British tennis player (1925–2004)

- Full name: Ruby Francis Woodgate
- Country (sports): United Kingdom
- Born: 28 April 1925
- Died: 5 November 2004 (aged 79)

Singles

Grand Slam singles results
- Wimbledon: 2R (1946, 1949, 1950, 1951, 1952, 1954, 1955, 1957)

Doubles

Grand Slam doubles results
- Wimbledon: QF (1955)

Grand Slam mixed doubles results
- Wimbledon: QF (1960, 1961)

Ruby "Billie" Francis Woodgate (28 April 1925 — 5 November 2004) was a British tennis player.

Woodgate, sister of Georgie, was the youngest of a pair of Middlesex sisters who were active on tour from the 1940s through to the 1960s. She never made it past the singles second round at the Wimbledon Championships, but had better results in doubles. In 1955, she reached the women's doubles quarter-finals with Rosemary Walsh. She was also twice a Wimbledon mixed doubles quarter-finalist, both times partnering John Barrett (1960 and 1961).
