= Violette Rigollet =

Swiss tennis player

- Full name: Violette Alvensleben-Rigollet
- Country (sports): Switzerland
- Born: 3 September 1930
- Died: 30 July 1991 (aged 60)

Singles

Grand Slam singles results
- French Open: 3R (1952)
- Wimbledon: 3R (1952)

Doubles

Grand Slam doubles results
- French Open: QF (1953)
- Wimbledon: 3R (1953)

Grand Slam mixed doubles results
- French Open: 1R (1952, 1953)
- Wimbledon: QF (1953)

Violette Alvensleben-Rigollet (3 September 1930 — 30 July 1991) was a Swiss tennis player. She was a countess, married to Count Londolf Alvensleben, a nobleman of Polish origin.

Rigollet won six national singles championships in succession from 1948 to 1953. She made the quarter-finals in doubles at both the French Championships and Wimbledon during her career. In 1954 was singles champion at the Swiss International Championships in Gstaad, beating British Wightman Cup player Pat Ward in the final.
