= Lorna Cornell =

British tennis player

- Country (sports): Great Britain
- Born: 3 January 1933 (age 92)

Singles

Grand Slam singles results
- French Open: 3R (1965)
- Wimbledon: 4R (1951, 1963)
- US Open: 2R (1963)

Doubles

Grand Slam doubles results
- French Open: 3R (1962, 1965)
- Wimbledon: 3R (1954, 1965)

Grand Slam mixed doubles results
- French Open: 2R (1963)
- Wimbledon: 4R (1952, 1955)

Lorna Cornell (born 3 January 1933) is a British former tennis player.

Cornell is the daughter of athlete Muriel Gunn-Cornell, who was a world record holder for long jump.

Active in the 1950s and 1960s, Cornell won the Wimbledon junior singles title twice and made regular appearances at the tournaments for two decades. She won the St.George's Hill Open singles title in 1961 and 1964.

Cornell married Australian tennis coach Peter Cawthorn in 1953 but towards the end of her career had remarried and was competing as Lorna Greville-Collins.

Other than tennis, Cornell also excelled in long jump as a junior and was named on the list of "possibles" to represent Great Britain at the 1948 Summer Olympics.
