= Peggy Dawson-Scott =

British tennis player

- Full name: Peggy Leila Dawson-Scott
- Country (sports): Great Britain
- Born: 1920 Brentford, Oxfordshire
- Died: 1993 (aged 72) Bodmin, Cornwall

Grand Slam singles results
- Wimbledon: QF (1949)

Grand Slam doubles results
- Wimbledon: QF (1951)

Grand Slam mixed doubles results
- Wimbledon: 4R (1951, 1952)

Peggy Dawson-Scott (1920–1993), born Peggy Maccorkindale, was a British amateur tennis player.

Born in Oxfordshire, Dawson-Scott was active in the 1940s and 1950s. She reached the singles quarter-finals of the 1949 Wimbledon Championships, beating sixth seed Jean Quertier en route.

Dawson-Scott's first marriage was to Scottish rugby union international William Penman in 1940. He was killed in World War II while serving with the Royal Air Force and she remarried in 1945 to Edward Dawson Scott.
