= 1952 French Championships (tennis) =

- Date: 20 May – 2 June 1952
- Edition: 51
- Category: 22nd Grand Slam (ITF)
- Surface: Clay
- Location: Paris (XVI^{e}), France
- Venue: Stade Roland Garros

Champions

Men's singles
- (Egypt) Jaroslav Drobný

Women's singles
- (United States) Doris Hart

Men's doubles
- (Australia) Ken McGregor / (Australia) Frank Sedgman

Women's doubles
- (United States) Doris Hart / (United States) Shirley Fry

Mixed doubles
- (United States) Doris Hart / (Australia) Frank Sedgman
- French Championships

The 1952 French Championships (now known as the French Open) was a tennis tournament that took place on the outdoor clay courts at the Stade Roland-Garros in Paris, France. The tournament ran from 20 May until 2 June. It was the 56th staging of the French Championships, and the second Grand Slam tennis event of 1952. Jaroslav Drobný and Doris Hart won the singles titles.

== Finals ==
=== Men's singles ===
(Egypt) Jaroslav Drobný defeated (Australia) Frank Sedgman 6–2, 6–0, 3–6, 6–4

=== Women's singles ===
(United States) Doris Hart defeated (United States) Shirley Fry 6–4, 6–4

=== Men's doubles ===
(Australia) Ken McGregor / (Australia) Frank Sedgman defeated (United States) Gardnar Mulloy / (United States) Dick Savitt 6–3, 6–4, 6–4

=== Women's doubles ===
(United States) Doris Hart / (United States) Shirley Fry defeated (South Africa) Hazel Redick-Smith / (South Africa) Julia Wipplinger 7–5, 6–1

=== Mixed doubles ===
(United States) Doris Hart / (Australia) Frank Sedgman defeated (United States) Shirley Fry / (South Africa) Eric Sturgess 6–8, 6–3, 6–3

Preceded by 1952 Australian Championships	Grand Slams	Succeeded by 1952 Wimbledon Championships
