= Barbara Knapp =

British tennis player

- Country (sports): United Kingdom
- Born: 29 March 1920; Birmingham, England
- Died: 1978 (aged 58); Birmingham, England

Singles

Grand Slam singles results
- Wimbledon: 3R (1952, 1954)
- US Open: 1R (1950)

Doubles

Grand Slam doubles results
- Wimbledon: 2R (1951, 52, 56, 57, 58)

Grand Slam mixed doubles results
- Wimbledon: 4R (1951)

Barbara Knapp (29 March 1920 – 1978) was a British tennis player. She was also an England international in squash.

Born and raised in Birmingham, Knapp attended King Edward VI High School for Girls and was most active on the tour during the 1950s. She made the singles third round at Wimbledon twice and was a finalist at the 1950 Canadian Championships. At the 1950 U.S. National Championships she played a historic first round match against Althea Gibson, who became the first black player to feature at the tournament. She lost to Gibson in straight sets.

Knapp, a physical education at Birmingham University, died in 1978 of a long illness.
