= Pat Harrison (tennis) =

British tennis player

- Full name: Patricia Harrison
- Country (sports): Great Britain
- Plays: Right-handed

Singles

Grand Slam singles results
- Wimbledon: 4R (1956)

Doubles

Grand Slam doubles results
- Wimbledon: 3R (1953, 1954)

Grand Slam mixed doubles results
- Wimbledon: 3R (1952)

Patricia Harrison is a British former tennis player. A native of Manchester, Harrison was active in the 1950s.

Harrison claimed the 1953 All England Plate and was a regular Lancashire county champion. In 1954 she became engaged to James Hugh Brown, a company director and county tennis player. Competing under her married name, she made the round of 16 at the 1956 Wimbledon Championships, which was her best performance at the tournament.
