= Trevor Fancutt =

South African tennis player (1934–2022)

- Full name: Trevor Thomas Fancutt
- Country (sports): South Africa
- Born: 14 July 1934 Kokstad, Griqualand East, Cape Province, South Africa
- Died: 23 December 2022 (aged 88) Australia

Singles
- Career record: 1–3

Grand Slam singles results
- Australian Open: QF (1958)
- French Open: 3R (1956)
- Wimbledon: 2R (1952, 1955, 1956, 1957)

Doubles
- Career record: 0–3

Grand Slam doubles results
- Australian Open: QF (1958, 1960)
- French Open: SF (1956)
- Wimbledon: 3R (1955)

Mixed doubles

Grand Slam mixed doubles results
- Australian Open: W (1960)
- Wimbledon: SF (1956)

Trevor Fancutt (14 July 1934 – 23 December 2022) was a South African tennis player.

In 1960 Fancutt, partnering Jan Lehane, won the mixed doubles title of the Australian Championships, defeating Christine Truman and Martin Mulligan in straight sets.

In 1957, he played in two ties for the South African Davis Cup team and compiled a match record of two wins and two losses.

In August 1957, he beat Alex Olmedo in the final of the international tournament in Kitzbühel, Austria in three straight sets.

Fancutt married Australian singles semi finalist Daphne Seeney. Two of their sons, Charlie Fancutt and Michael Fancutt, were professional tennis players who played on the main tour (a third son Chris Fancutt played at challenger level).

Fancutt died on 23 December 2022, at the age of 88.

== Grand Slam finals ==
=== Mixed doubles (1 title) ===
Result	Year	Championship	Surface	Partner	Opponents	Score
Win	1960	Australian Championships	Grass	(Australia) Jan Lehane	(Australia) Martin Mulligan (United Kingdom) Christine Truman	6–2, 7–5
