= Julia Wipplinger =

South African tennis player (born 1923)

- Full name: Julia Therese Tamsen Wipplinger
- Country (sports): South Africa
- Born: 23 October 1923 Transvaal, South Africa

Grand Slam singles results
- French Open: QF (1952)
- Wimbledon: 4R (1952)

Grand Slam doubles results
- Australian Open: F (1952)
- French Open: F (1954)
- Wimbledon: 2R (1954)

Grand Slam mixed doubles results
- Australian Open: QF (1954)
- Wimbledon: 2R (1954)

Julia Wipplinger (née Tamsen; born 23 October 1923) is a former tennis player from South Africa who was active in the 1950s.

== Career ==
Wipplinger teamed with fellow South African Hazel Redick-Smith to reach the doubles final at the French Championships. In the final they were defeated in straight sets by Doris Hart and Shirley Fry. They again reached the doubles final at a Grand Slam tournament two years later at the 1954 Australian Championships. This time the Australian team of Mary Bevis Hawton and Beryl Penrose won in straight sets. Her best Grand Slam performance in the singles was reaching the quarterfinals at the 1952 French Championships and the fourth round at the 1954 Wimbledon Championships.

In April 1952 she was runner-up to Doris Hart in the singles event of the South African Championships. In July 1952 she reached the singles final at the Swedish Open in Båstad but was beaten by her doubles partner Hazel Redick-Smith in straight sets. Redick-Smith also defeated her in the singles final of the 1953 South African Championships. She was part of a South African team, with Hazel Redick-Smith, Ian Vermaak, Owen Williams and Abe Segal who went on a tour in Australia in February and March 1954.

== Grand Slam finals ==
=== Doubles (2 losses) ===
Result	Year	Championship	Surface	Partner	Opponents	Score
Loss	1952	French Championships	Clay	(South Africa) Hazel Redick-Smith	(United States) Doris Hart (United States) Shirley Fry	5–7, 1–6
Loss	1954	Australian Championships	Grass	(South Africa) Hazel Redick-Smith	(Australia) Mary Bevis Hawton (Australia) Beryl Penrose	3–6, 6–8
