= Mary Eyre =

British sportswoman and administrator

Margaret Mary Eyre MBE (1923 – 7 November 2013) was a British sportswoman and administrator.

Eyre played hockey for England 16 times from 1945 to 1951, scoring 17 goals.

She competed in the Wimbledon Ladies' Doubles nine times between 1949 and 1957, reaching the quarter-finals four times.

In the 2006 New Year Honours, she was appointed an MBE, "For services to Sport".

In later life, she was President of the East Gloucestershire Hockey Club.
