= Mary Halford (tennis) =

British tennis player and coach

- Full name: Mary Eileen Halford OBE
- Country (sports): United Kingdom
- Born: 14 December 1915; Dulwich, England
- Died: 1 November 2009 (aged 93); Esher, England

Singles

Grand Slam singles results
- French Open: 3R (1938)
- Wimbledon: 4R (1936, 1946, 1948, 1950)

Doubles

Grand Slam doubles results
- Wimbledon: QF (1948, 1952)

Grand Slam mixed doubles results
- Wimbledon: SF (1936)

Mary Eileen Halford, OBE (nee Whitmarsh; 14 December 1915 — 1 November 2009) was a British tennis player and coach. In the 1940s she married Peter Halford, who played for the Great Britain national field hockey team.

Born in Dulwich, Halford made her Wimbledon debut at age 17 in 1933 and was the youngest competitor in the women's event that year. She made the singles fourth round at Wimbledon on four occasions and was a mixed doubles semi-finalist in 1936 with Frank Wilde. In 1946 she played Wightman Cup tennis for Great Britain.

Halford became non-playing captain of the Wightman Cup team in 1954. Her final year as captain in 1958 saw Great Britain win the tournament for the first time in 28-years, after which she announced her retirement. She was honoured with an OBE in the 1959 New Year Honours list for services to tennis.
