= Georgie Woodgate =

British tennis player

- Full name: Georgiana Elizabeth Woodgate Cox
- Country (sports): United Kingdom
- Born: 6 July 1923
- Died: 12 May 2001 (aged 77)
- Plays: Right-handed

Singles

Grand Slam singles results
- French Open: 3R (1951)
- Wimbledon: 4R (1952)

Doubles

Grand Slam doubles results
- French Open: QF (1951)
- Wimbledon: QF (1956)

Grand Slam mixed doubles results
- Wimbledon: 4R (1947, 1954)

Georgiana Elizabeth Cox (née Woodgate; 6 July 1923 — 12 May 2001) was a British tennis player active from the 1940s to 1960s. Her younger sister Billie was also a tennis player.

Woodgate claimed the singles title at the Welsh Championships in 1949, then in 1950 won the singles and doubles at the Welsh Covered Court Championships. In 1951 she won the Henley Hard Courts summer meeting. In 1952 she made the singles fourth round of the Wimbledon Championships, beating Wightman Cup player Pat Ward en route. She was singles runner-up to Angela Mortimer at the 1953 British Covered Court Championships. In 1956 she reached the women's doubles quarter-finals at Wimbledon.
