= Rosemary Deloford =

British squash and tennis player

- Country (sports): United Kingdom
- Born: 26 April 1928
- Died: 24 May 2024 (aged 96) Surrey, England

Grand Slam singles results
- Wimbledon: 4R (1949)

Grand Slam doubles results
- Wimbledon: QF (1955)

Grand Slam mixed doubles results
- Wimbledon: 3R (1954)

Rosemary Deloford (née Walsh; 26 April 1928 – 24 May 2024) was a British squash and tennis player.

A native of Birmingham, Deloford competed regularly at the Wimbledon Championships during her career. She reached the singles fourth round in 1949, claimed the 1954 All England Plate and was a doubles quarter-finalist in 1955.

Deloford won the Surrey tennis championships in Surbiton in 1955.

As a squash player she was a semi-finalist at both the British Open and U.S. national championships.

Deloford was married to tennis player John Laurence "Jack" Deloford at a London church in 1955. She died in Surrey on 24 May 2024, at the age of 96.
