= 1948 Wimbledon Championships – Women's singles =

Women's singles
- 1948 Wimbledon Championships

Final
- Champion: (United States) Louise Brough
- Runner-up: (United States) Doris Hart
- Score: 6–3, 8–6

Details
- Draw: 96 (10 Q )
- Seeds: 8

Events
Singles	men	women		boys	girls
Doubles	men	women	mixed	boys	girls
← 1947 ·	Wimbledon Championships	· 1949 →

Louise Brough defeated Doris Hart in the final, 6–3, 8–6 to win the ladies' singles tennis title at the 1948 Wimbledon Championships. Margaret duPont was the defending champion, but lost in the semifinals to Doris Hart.

== Seeds ==
1. (United States) Margaret duPont (semifinals)
2. (United States) Louise Brough (champion)
3. (United States) Pat Todd (semifinals)
4. (United States) Doris Hart (final)
5. (United Kingdom) Jean Bostock (quarterfinals)
6. (South Africa) Sheila Summers (fourth round)
7. (France) Nelly Landry (quarterfinals)
8. (United States) Shirley Fry (quarterfinals)

Click on the seed number of a player to go to their draw section.

== Draw ==
=== Key ===
- Q = Qualifier
- WC = Wild card
- LL = Lucky loser
- Alt = Alternate
- SE = Special exempt
- PR = Protected ranking
- ITF = ITF entry
- JE = Junior exempt
- w/o = Walkover
- r = Retired
- d = Defaulted
- SR = Special ranking

=== Finals ===
Quarterfinals
1	(United States) Margaret duPont	7	6
5	(United Kingdom) Jean Bostock	5	3
4	(United States) Doris Hart	6	6
7	(France) Nelly Landry	0	2
(United Kingdom) Jean Quertier	2	4
3	(United States) Pat Todd	6	6
8	(United States) Shirley Fry	1^{r}
2	(United States) Louise Brough	3

Semifinals
1	(United States) Margaret duPont	4	6	3
4	(United States) Doris Hart	6	2	6
3	(United States) Pat Todd	3	5
2	(United States) Louise Brough	6	7

Final
4	(United States) Doris Hart	3	6
2	(United States) Louise Brough	6	8

=== Top half ===
==== Section 1 ====
First round

Second round
1	(United States) Margaret duPont	6	6
(United Kingdom) Valerie Cooper	3	0
(Netherlands) Truid Blaisse-Terwindt	7	6
Q	(United Kingdom) Barbara Behr	5	4
(Republic of Ireland) Roguie Bain	7	3
(United Kingdom) Katherine Keith-Steele	9	6
(United Kingdom) Penny Durlac	5	2
(United Kingdom) Peggy Dawson-Scott	7	6

Third round
1	(United States) M duPont	6	6
(Netherlands) G Blaisse-Terwindt	2	2
(United Kingdom) K Keith-Steele	2	4
(United Kingdom) P Dawson-Scott	6	6

Fourth round
1	(United States) M duPont	6	6
(United Kingdom) P Dawson-Scott	2	2

==== Section 2 ====
First round

Second round
5	(United Kingdom) Jean Bostock	6	6
(Austria) Hilde Doleschell	1	4
(United Kingdom) Gem Hoahing	6	6
Q	(United Kingdom) Enid Kerr	3	1
(South Africa) Dorothy Muller	2	6	6
(Kenya) Sheila Dowdeswell	6	2	3
(United Kingdom) Pat Cowney	1	6
(France) Colette Boegner	6	8

Third round
5	(United Kingdom) J Bostock	6	6
(United Kingdom) C Hoahing	1	2
(South Africa) D Muller	2	6	7
(France) C Boegner	6	4	5

Fourth round
5	(United Kingdom) J Bostock	6	2	7
(South Africa) D Muller	2	6	5

==== Section 3 ====
First round
4	(United States) Doris Hart	4	6	6
(United Kingdom) Joy Gannon	6	0	1
(United Kingdom) Betty Cooke	4	0
(United States) Helen Rihbany	6	6
(United Kingdom) Gladys Lines	6	6
(Netherlands) Nel Hermsen	0	4
(Italy) Annelise Bossi	4	4
(Czechoslovakia) Edith Sutz	6	6
(United Kingdom) Joan Curry	6	8
(United States) Argyll Rice	2	6
(United Kingdom) Gay Chandler	6	6
(United Kingdom) Joey David	4	1
(Lebanon) Vera Mattar	1	1
(United States) Barbara Scofield	6	6
(Argentina) Mary Terán de Weiss	8	6
(United Kingdom) Georgie Woodgate	6	3

Second round
4	(United States) D Hart	6	6
(United States) H Rihbany	0	1
(United Kingdom) G Lines	6	3	6
(Czechoslovakia) E Sutz	0	6	2
(United Kingdom) J Curry	6	6
(United Kingdom) G Chandler	4	3
(United States) B Scofield	6	7
(Argentina) M Terán de Weiss	3	5

Third round
4	(United States) D Hart	6	6
(United Kingdom) G Lines	1	4
(United Kingdom) J Curry	7	6
(United States) B Scofield	5	4

Fourth round
4	(United States) D Hart	6	6
(United Kingdom) J Curry	2	3

==== Section 4 ====
First round
7	(France) Nelly Landry	6	6
(Norway) Laila Schou Nilsen	1	3
(United Kingdom) Patsy O'Connell	6	4	6
(United Kingdom) Wendy Stork	4	6	3
(United Kingdom) Kay Tuckey	6	6
(United Kingdom) Margaret Carlisle	4	1
(United Kingdom) Patsy Rogers	6	6
(United Kingdom) Viola White	3	1
(United States) Gloria Butler	8	6
Q	(United Kingdom) Edna Pool	6	2
(United Kingdom) Vera Thomas	6	6
Q	(United Kingdom) Judy Wallace	2	3
(Hungary) Márta Peterdy	8	6
(Republic of Ireland) Mary Fitzgibbon	6	4
(United Kingdom) Laura Morgan	1	2
(Belgium) Miriamme de Borman	6	6

Second round
7	(France) N Landry
(United Kingdom) P O'Connell	w/o
(United Kingdom) K Tuckey	6	8	6
(United Kingdom) P Rogers	8	6	2
(United States) G Butler	2	3
(United Kingdom) V Thomas	6	6
(Hungary) M Peterdy	6	7
(Belgium) M de Borman	3	5

Third round
7	(France) N Landry	6	6
(United Kingdom) K Tuckey	1	1
(United Kingdom) V Thomas	6	4	6
(Hungary) M Peterdy	1	6	1

Fourth round
7	(France) N Landry	6	8
(United Kingdom) V Thomas	3	6

=== Bottom half ===
==== Section 5 ====
First round
(United Kingdom) Joy Hibbert	3	2
(Denmark) Lisa Andersen	6	6
(United States) Margaret Cary	2	6	1
(United Kingdom) Jean Quertier	6	3	6
(United Kingdom) Lesley Fulton	6	4	6
(Republic of Ireland) Maeve Brennan	3	6	3
Q	(United Kingdom) Erica Percival	4	5
(United Kingdom) Molly Blair	6	7
(Luxembourg) Alice Weiwers	5	6	6
(Netherlands) Madzy Couquerque	7	0	2
(United States) Rita Anderson	6	6
(United Kingdom) Pearl Panton	1	4
Q	(United Kingdom) Pauline Fisher	2	1
(United Kingdom) Margot Parker	6	6
(United Kingdom) Elsie Phillips	5	1
6	(South Africa) Sheila Summers	7	6

Second round
(Denmark) L Andersen	0	1
(United Kingdom) J Quertier	6	6
(United Kingdom) L Fulton	1	2
(United Kingdom) M Blair	6	6
(Luxembourg) A Weiwers	8	14	6
(United States) R Anderson	10	12	4
(United Kingdom) M Parker	4	3
6	(South Africa) S Summers	6	6

Third round
(United Kingdom) J Quertier	6	6	0
(United Kingdom) M Blair	8	0	0^{r}
(Luxembourg) A Weiwers	0	1
6	(South Africa) S Summers	6	6

Fourth round
(United Kingdom) J Quertier	7	6
6	(South Africa) S Summers	5	2

==== Section 6 ====
First round
(United Kingdom) Margaret Lewis	6	2	1
Q	(United Kingdom) Enid Andrews	4	6	6
(United Kingdom) Betty Passingham	6	6
(Norway) Lill Lind	3	3
(United Kingdom) Audrey Osborne	4	2
(United Kingdom) Mary Halford	6	6
(United Kingdom) Molly James	2	6	6
(United Kingdom) Phyllis Grover	6	2	1
(United Kingdom) Thelma Lister	4	3
(United Kingdom) Pam Bocquet	6	6
(United Kingdom) Janet Morgan	6	6
(United Kingdom) Dorrit Herbst	4	3
(United Kingdom) Effie Peters	3	0
(United Kingdom) Barbara Knapp	6	6
(United Kingdom) Jean Walker-Smith	2	1
3	(United States) Pat Todd	6	6

Second round
Q	(United Kingdom) E Andrews	5	6	7
(United Kingdom) E Passingham	7	4	9
(United Kingdom) M Halford	6	6
(United Kingdom) M James	3	0
(United Kingdom) P Bocquet	6	6
(United Kingdom) J Morgan	2	3
(United Kingdom) B Knapp	1	6
3	(United States) P Todd	6	8

Third round
(United Kingdom) E Passingham	3	0
(United Kingdom) M Halford	6	6
(United Kingdom) P Bocquet	4	0
3	(United States) P Todd	6	6

Fourth round
(United Kingdom) M Halford	3	3
3	(United States) P Todd	6	6

==== Section 7 ====
First round

Second round
(Hungary) Zsuzsa Körmöczy	6	6
(France) Ginette Jucker	2	2
(Belgium) Josane de Meulemeester	6	6
(Netherlands) Tineke Lubbers-Fischer	2	1
(United Kingdom) Betty Hilton	6	6
Q	(United Kingdom) Mary Wavish	0	1
(United Kingdom) Madge Slaney	1	1
8	(United States) Shirley Fry	6	6

Third round
(Hungary) Z Körmöczy	3	6	6
(Belgium) J de Meulemeester	6	2	1
(United Kingdom) E Hilton	1	6	2
8	(United States) S Fry	6	1	6

Fourth round
(Hungary) Z Körmöczy	6	4	4
8	(United States) S Fry	4	6	6

==== Section 8 ====
First round

Second round
(United Kingdom) Edith Middleton	6	6	6
(United Kingdom) Bea Carris	8	4	1
Q	(United Kingdom) Beryl Parker	3	4
(United Kingdom) Leonie Brighton	6	6
(United Kingdom) Betty Wilford	4	2
(United States) Mary Prentiss	6	6
(Republic of Ireland) Betty Lombard	1	1
2	(United States) Louise Brough	6	6

Third round
(United Kingdom) E Middleton	3	6	6
(United Kingdom) L Brighton	6	2	2
(United States) M Prentiss	1	6	1
2	(United States) L Brough	6	4	6

Fourth round
(United Kingdom) E Middleton	0	1
2	(United States) L Brough	6	6

Preceded by 1948 French Championships – Women's singles	Grand Slam women's singles	Succeeded by 1948 U.S. National Championships – Women's singles
