= 1946 Wimbledon Championships – Women's singles =

Women's singles
- 1946 Wimbledon Championships

Final
- Champion: (United States) Pauline Betz
- Runner-up: (United States) Louise Brough
- Score: 6–2, 6–4

Details
- Draw: 96
- Seeds: 8

Events
Singles	men	women		boys	girls
Doubles	men	women	mixed	boys	girls
← 1939 ·	Wimbledon Championships	· 1947 →

Pauline Betz defeated Louise Brough in the final, 6–2, 6–4 to win the ladies' singles tennis title at the 1946 Wimbledon Championships. Alice Marble was the defending champion, but was ineligible to compete after turning professional.

== Seeds ==
1. (United States) Pauline Betz (champion)
2. (United States) Margaret Osborne (semifinals)
3. (United States) Louise Brough (final)
4. (United Kingdom) Kay Menzies (quarterfinals)
5. (United States) Dorothy Bundy (semifinals)
6. (United Kingdom) Jean Bostock (quarterfinals)
7. (United States) Doris Hart (quarterfinals)
8. (France) Simone Lafargue (fourth round)

Click on the seed number of a player to go to their draw section.

== Draw ==
=== Key ===
- Q = Qualifier
- WC = Wild card
- LL = Lucky loser
- Alt = Alternate
- SE = Special exempt
- PR = Protected ranking
- ITF = ITF entry
- JE = Junior exempt
- w/o = Walkover
- r = Retired
- d = Defaulted
- SR = Special ranking

=== Finals ===
Quarterfinals
1	(United States) Pauline Betz	6	6
(United Kingdom) Joan Curry	0	3
4	(United Kingdom) Kay Menzies	6	1	3
5	(United States) Dorothy Bundy	4	6	6
6	(United Kingdom) Jean Bostock	1	2
3	(United States) Louise Brough	6	6
7	(United States) Doris Hart	7	4	4
2	(United States) Margaret Osborne	5	6	6

Semifinals
1	(United States) Pauline Betz	6	6
5	(United States) Dorothy Bundy	2	3
3	(United States) Louise Brough	8	7
2	(United States) Margaret Osborne	6	5

Final
1	(United States) Pauline Betz	6	6
3	(United States) Louise Brough	2	4

=== Top half ===
==== Section 1 ====
First round

Second round
1	(United States) Pauline Betz	6	6
(Belgium) Josane de Meulemeester	3	1
(United Kingdom) Joy Gannon	6	6
(United Kingdom) Jean Poynder	2	2
(United Kingdom) Valerie Cooper	6	8
(United Kingdom) YL Webster	1	6
(United Kingdom) Gay Chandler	5	4
(United Kingdom) Alex McKelvie	7	6

Third round
1	(United States) P Betz	6	6
(United Kingdom) J Gannon	1	0
(United Kingdom) V Cooper	0	7	6
(United Kingdom) A McKelvie	6	5	4

Fourth round
1	(United States) P Betz	6	6
(United Kingdom) V Cooper	1	0

==== Section 2 ====
First round

Second round
8	(France) Simone Lafargue	6	6
(Poland) Jadwiga Jędrzejowska	4	4
(United Kingdom) Janet Morgan	5	9	6
(United Kingdom) Sally Lister	7	7	3
(Netherlands) Joopy van der Wal	6	5	4
(Czechoslovakia) Helena Straubeová	1	7	6
(United Kingdom) Joan Curry	6	6
(Poland) Joanna Russocki	1	1

Third round
8	(France) S Lafargue	6	7
(United Kingdom) J Morgan	1	5
(Czechoslovakia) H Straubeová	0	2
(United Kingdom) J Curry	6	6

Fourth round
8	(France) S Lafargue	3	3
(United Kingdom) J Curry	6	6

==== Section 3 ====
First round
4	(United Kingdom) Kay Menzies	6	6
(United Kingdom) Patsy O'Connell	1	1
(United Kingdom) Yvonne Law	6	6
(United Kingdom) Georgie Woodgate	1	3
(United Kingdom) Billie Yorke	6	6
(United Kingdom) Betty Wilford	2	2
(United Kingdom) Freda Hammersley	w/o
(Netherlands) Mrs LM Godefroy
(United Kingdom) Mary Chamberlain	1	4
(United Kingdom) Nancy Macpherson-Grant	6	6
(United Kingdom) Audrey Wenyon	6	5	6
(Republic of Ireland) Pamela Goodwyn	1	7	4
(United Kingdom) Dorrit Herbst	6	6
(Denmark) Milly Vagn-Nielsen	3	2
(United Kingdom) Eileen Porter	4	6	4
(Belgium) Yvonne Vincart	6	3	6

Second round
4	(United Kingdom) K Menzies	6	6
(United Kingdom) Y Law	3	1
(United Kingdom) B Yorke	6	6
(Netherlands) Mrs LM Godefroy	2	2
(United Kingdom) N Macpherson-Grant	6	2	6
(United Kingdom) A Wenyon	3	6	1
(United Kingdom) D Herbst	6	2	0
(Belgium) Y Vincart	1	6	6

Third round
4	(United Kingdom) K Menzies	6	6
(United Kingdom) B Yorke	1	2
(United Kingdom) N Macpherson-Grant	3	6	6
(Belgium) Y Vincart	6	2	4

Fourth round
4	(United Kingdom) K Menzies	6	6
(United Kingdom) N Macpherson-Grant	0	2

==== Section 4 ====
First round
5	(United States) Dorothy Bundy	6	6
(United Kingdom) Evelyn Murdock	0	1
(United Kingdom) Audrey Osborne	4	2
(United Kingdom) Betty Passingham	6	6
(United Kingdom) Betty Couper	1	1
(Netherlands) Truid Blaisse	6	6
(United States) Katherine Winthrop	6	6
(United Kingdom) Nora Maingay	0	1
(United Kingdom) Doreen Litherland	3	4
(United Kingdom) Molly Lincoln	6	6
(United Kingdom) Sheila Kenyon	6	6
(United Kingdom) Molly James	3	4
(United Kingdom) Betty Coutts	6	3	6
(United Kingdom) Audrey Roberts	2	6	3
(France) Simonne Mathieu	5	6	6
(United Kingdom) Betty Nuthall	7	3	8

Second round
5	(United States) D Bundy	6	6
(United Kingdom) E Passingham	4	1
(Netherlands) G Blaisse	6	0	1
(United States) K Winthrop	2	6	6
(United Kingdom) M Lincoln	2	6	6
(United Kingdom) S Kenyon	6	2	3
(United Kingdom) B Coutts	0	5
(United Kingdom) B Nuthall	6	7

Third round
5	(United States) D Bundy	9	6
(United States) K Winthrop	7	0
(United Kingdom) M Lincoln	1	6	1
(United Kingdom) B Nuthall	6	4	6

Fourth round
5	(United States) D Bundy	6	6
(United Kingdom) B Nuthall	3	2

=== Bottom half ===
==== Section 5 ====
First round
(United Kingdom) Nancy Glover	7	6
(United Kingdom) Stella Mason	5	0
(United Kingdom) Gladys Lines	6	6
(United Kingdom) Doris Heppenstall	4	4
(United Kingdom) Louise Anderson	1	1
(United Kingdom) Peggy Vivian	6	6
(France) Jacqueline Marcellin	2	4
(United Kingdom) Jean Quertier	6	6
(United Kingdom) Peggy Knight	1	3
(United Kingdom) Effie Peters	6	6
(France) Micheline Inglebert	6	6
(United Kingdom) Nancy Liebert	4	2
(United Kingdom) Billie Woodgate	4	7	6
(United Kingdom) Peggy Dawson-Scott	6	5	4
(Czechoslovakia) Edith Sutz	1	4
6	(United Kingdom) Jean Bostock	6	6

Second round
(United Kingdom) N Glover	7	0	3
(United Kingdom) G Lines	5	6	6
(United Kingdom) M Vivian	6	6
(United Kingdom) J Quertier	0	3
(United Kingdom) E Peters	5	6	4
(France) M Inglebert	7	2	6
(United Kingdom) R Woodgate	0	3
6	(United Kingdom) J Bostock	6	6

Third round
(United Kingdom) G Lines	8	1	2
(United Kingdom) M Vivian	6	6	6
(France) M Inglebert	2	2
6	(United Kingdom) J Bostock	6	6

Fourth round
(United Kingdom) M Vivian	0	1
6	(United Kingdom) J Bostock	6	6

==== Section 6 ====
First round
(United Kingdom) Susan Powell	6	11
(United Kingdom) Betty Uber	1	9
(United Kingdom) Thelma Jarvis	1	3
(United Kingdom) Mary Halford	6	6
(United Kingdom) Edie Luxton	4	0
(France) Colette Boegner	6	6
(Jamaica) Jean MacNair	3	0
(United Kingdom) Joan Strawson	6	6
(United States) Pat Todd	6	4	6
(United Kingdom) Vera Dace	1	6	4
(United Kingdom) Elsa Haylock	8	4	6
(Netherlands) RM Mechel	6	6	1
(France) Nelly Landry	7	1	6
(Netherlands) Madzy Couquerque	5	6	3
(Australia) Alison Burton	w/o
3	(United States) Louise Brough

Second round
(United Kingdom) S Powell	6	3	2
(United Kingdom) M Halford	3	6	6
(France) C Boegner	6	6
(United Kingdom) J Strawson	0	1
(United States) P Todd	6	6
(United Kingdom) E Haylock	1	0
(France) N Landry	2	1
3	(United States) L Brough	6	6

Third round
(United Kingdom) M Halford	6	6	7
(France) C Boegner	8	4	5
(United States) P Todd	6	7	1
3	(United States) L Brough	2	9	6

Fourth round
(United Kingdom) M Halford	1	3
3	(United States) L Brough	6	6

==== Section 7 ====
First round

Second round
(United Kingdom) Patsy Rodgers	6	2	2
(United Kingdom) Gem Hoahing	2	6	6
(United Kingdom) Rosemary Mobbs	7	6	2
(United Kingdom) Bea Carris	5	8	6
(United Kingdom) Pearl Panton	7	6
(United States) Mary Belin	5	3
(United Kingdom) Joan Ingram	0	1
7	(United States) Doris Hart	6	6

Third round
(United Kingdom) C Hoahing	2	6	1
(United Kingdom) B Carris	6	1	6
(United Kingdom) P Panton	1	4
7	(United States) D Hart	6	6

Fourth round
(United Kingdom) B Carris	8	2	2
7	(United States) D Hart	6	6	6

==== Section 8 ====
First round

Second round
(France) Jacqueline Patorni	6	6
(Netherlands) Nel Hermsen	2	1
(United Kingdom) Betty Hilton	6	6
(United Kingdom) Margaret Lewis	3	2
(France) Suzanne Pannetier	6	6
(Belgium) Miriamme de Borman	4	0
(United Kingdom) Wendy Stork	2	0
2	(United States) Margaret Osborne	6	6

Third round
(France) J Patorni	3	2
(United Kingdom) E Hilton	6	6
(France) S Pannetier	0	0
2	(United States) M Osborne	6	6

Fourth round
(United Kingdom) E Hilton	1	1
2	(United States) M Osborne	6	6

Preceded by 1946 French Championships – Women's singles	Grand Slam women's singles	Succeeded by 1946 U.S. National Championships – Women's singles
