= 1946 Wimbledon Championships – Mixed doubles =

Mixed doubles
- 1946 Wimbledon Championships

Final
- Champions: (United States) Tom Brown (United States) Louise Brough
- Runners-up: (Australia) Geoff Brown (United States) Dorothy Bundy
- Score: 6–4, 6–4

Details
- Draw: 80
- Seeds: 4

Events
Singles	men	women		boys	girls
Doubles	men	women	mixed	boys	girls
- Wimbledon Championships

Bobby Riggs and Alice Marble were the defending champions, but were ineligible to compete after turning professional.

Tom Brown and Louise Brough defeated Geoff Brown and Dorothy Bundy in the final, 6–4, 6–4 to win the mixed doubles tennis title at the 1946 Wimbledon Championships.

== Seeds ==
1. (Australia) Harry Hopman / (United States) Margaret Osborne (semifinals)
2. (Australia) Geoff Brown / (United States) Dorothy Bundy (final)
3. (United States) Tom Brown / (United States) Louise Brough (champions)
4. (Australia) Dinny Pails / (United Kingdom) Kay Menzies (quarterfinals)

Click on the seed number of a player to go to their draw section.

== Draw ==
Key

- Q = Qualifier
- WC = Wild card
- LL = Lucky loser
- Alt = Alternate
- ITF = ITF entry
- PR = Protected ranking
- SR = Special ranking
- SE = Special exempt
- JE = Junior exempt
- JR = Junior Accelerator Programme entrant
- CO = College Accelerator Programme entrant
- NG = Next Gen Accelerator Program entrant
- w/o = Walkover
- r = Retired
- d = Defaulted

=== Finals ===
Quarterfinals
1	(Australia) Harry Hopman (United States) Margaret Osborne	6	6
(United Kingdom) Tony Mottram (United Kingdom) Betty Hilton	4	2
3	(United States) Tom Brown (United States) Louise Brough	6	6
(United Kingdom) Geoffrey Paish (United Kingdom) Vera Dace	3	2
(United States) Budge Patty (United States) Pauline Betz	6	7
4	(Australia) Dinny Pails (United Kingdom) Kay Menzies	4	5
(United Kingdom) Don Butler (United Kingdom) Jean Bostock	3	3
2	(Australia) Geoff Brown (United States) Dorothy Bundy	6	6

Semifinals
1	(Australia) Harry Hopman (United States) Margaret Osborne	3	3
3	(United States) Tom Brown (United States) Louise Brough	6	6
(United States) Budge Patty (United States) Pauline Betz	10	2
2	(Australia) Geoff Brown (United States) Dorothy Bundy	12	6

Final
3	(United States) Tom Brown (United States) Louise Brough	6	6
2	(Australia) Geoff Brown (United States) Dorothy Bundy	4	4

=== Top half ===
==== Section 1 ====
First round

Second round
1	(Australia) Harry Hopman (United States) Margaret Osborne	6	6
(Republic of Ireland) George McVeagh (United Kingdom) Gay Chandler	0	2
(United Kingdom) Roland Morton (United Kingdom) Betty Uber	3	2
(United Kingdom) Roland Carter (United Kingdom) Jean Quertier	6	6
(United Kingdom) Claude Lister (United Kingdom) Thelma Jarvis	5	5
(United Kingdom) Cliff Hovell (United Kingdom) Alex McKelvie	7	7
(United Kingdom) Derek Hardwick (United States) Doris Hart	6	6
(United Kingdom) H Wheeler (United Kingdom) Peggy Dawson-Scott	4	1

Third round
1	(Australia) H Hopman (United States) M Osborne	6	6
(United Kingdom) R Carter (United Kingdom) J Quertier	2	2
(United Kingdom) C Hovell (United Kingdom) A McKelvie	0	4
(United Kingdom) D Hardwick (United States) D Hart	6	6

Fourth round
1	(Australia) H Hopman (United States) M Osborne	6	6
(United Kingdom) D Hardwick (United States) D Hart	2	2

==== Section 2 ====
First round

Second round
(United Kingdom) Harold Marsland (United Kingdom) Doris Heppenstall	5	6	3
(Republic of Ireland) Raymond Egan (United Kingdom) Sally Lister	7	2	6
(Denmark) Jaanik Ipsen (United Kingdom) Gladys Lines	6	6
(United Kingdom) Bernard Neal (United Kingdom) Georgie Woodgate	3	1
(United Kingdom) Jimmy Hunt (United Kingdom) Betty Coutts	6	1	3
(United Kingdom) Tony Mottram (United Kingdom) Betty Hilton	4	6	6
(France) Yvon Petra (France) Simonne Mathieu
(United Kingdom) Erik Filby (United Kingdom) Nancy Glover	w/o

Third round
(Republic of Ireland) R Egan (United Kingdom) S Lister	3	6	4
(Denmark) J Ipsen (United Kingdom) G Lines	6	2	6
(United Kingdom) A Mottram (United Kingdom) E Hilton	6	6
(France) Y Petra (France) S Mathieu	4	3

Fourth round
(Denmark) J Ipsen (United Kingdom) G Lines	6	3	4
(United Kingdom) A Mottram (United Kingdom) E Hilton	1	6	6

==== Section 3 ====
First round

Second round
3	(United States) Tom Brown (United States) Louise Brough	6	6
(United Kingdom) Freddie Della Porta (United Kingdom) Patsy Rodgers	2	1
(United Kingdom) Ronald MacInnes (United Kingdom) Betty Couper	1	2
(United Kingdom) Cecil Betts (United Kingdom) Yvonne Law	6	6
(Norway) Finn Rune Karlsen (United Kingdom) Billie Woodgate
(Poland) Ignacy Tłoczyński (Poland) Jadwiga Jędrzejowska	w/o
(France) Pierre Pellizza (France) Simone Lafargue	6	2	6
(Argentina) Enrique Morea (United Kingdom) Billie Yorke	3	6	2

Third round
3	(United States) T Brown (United States) L Brough	6	6
(United Kingdom) C Betts (United Kingdom) Y Law	0	0
(Norway) FR Karlsen (United Kingdom) R Woodgate	2	2
(France) P Pellizza (France) S Lafargue	6	6

Fourth round
3	(United States) T Brown (United States) L Brough	4	6	10
(France) P Pellizza (France) S Lafargue	6	0	8

==== Section 4 ====
First round
(United Kingdom) Colin Ritchie (United Kingdom) Penny Durlac
(Chile) Andrés Hammersley (Netherlands) Madzy Couquerque	w/o
(United Kingdom) Arnold England (United Kingdom) Nancy Liebert	2	4
(France) Robert Abdesselam (France) Jacqueline Patorni	6	6
(United Kingdom) Derrick Barton (United Kingdom) Joy Gannon
(United Kingdom) Frank Wilde (United Kingdom) Freda Hammersley	w/o
(United Kingdom) Bill Manby (United Kingdom) Audrey Roberts	6	6
(Republic of Ireland) Dick Sandys (Republic of Ireland) Pamela Goodwyn	4	1
(United Kingdom) Alan Brown (United Kingdom) Nancy Macpherson-Grant	8	6
(United Kingdom) Tommy Anderson (United States) Mary Belin	6	3
(Belgium) Pierre Geelhand de Merxem (Belgium) Miriamme de Borman	4	4
(Sweden) Torsten Johansson (Denmark) Milly Vagn-Nielsen	6	6
(United Kingdom) Murray Deloford (United Kingdom) Sheila Kenyon	0	5
(Netherlands) Hans van Swol (United Kingdom) Bea Carris	6	7
(United Kingdom) John Comery (United Kingdom) Audrey Osborne	2	1
(United Kingdom) Geoffrey Paish (United Kingdom) Vera Dace	6	6

Second round
(United Kingdom) C Ritchie (United Kingdom) P Durlac	2	2
(France) R Abdesselam (France) J Patorni	6	6
(United Kingdom) D Barton (United Kingdom) J Gannon	5	6	6
(United Kingdom) N Manby (United Kingdom) A Roberts	7	2	1
(United Kingdom) A Brown (United Kingdom) N Macpherson-Grant	7	2	3
(Sweden) T Johansson (Denmark) M Vagn-Nielsen	5	6	6
(Netherlands) A van Swol (United Kingdom) B Carris	2	1
(United Kingdom) G Paish (United Kingdom) V Dace	6	6

Third round
(France) R Abdesselam (France) J Patorni	8	6
(United Kingdom) D Barton (United Kingdom) J Gannon	6	2
(Sweden) T Johansson (Denmark) M Vagn-Nielsen	9	0
(United Kingdom) G Paish (United Kingdom) V Dace	11	6

Fourth round
(France) R Abdesselam (France) J Patorni	3	3
(United Kingdom) G Paish (United Kingdom) V Dace	6	6

=== Bottom half ===
==== Section 5 ====
First round
(United Kingdom) Henry Billington (United Kingdom) Susan Billington	6	3	2
(United Kingdom) Charles Kingsley (United Kingdom) Patsy O'Connell	4	6	6
(New Zealand) Dennis Coombe (United Kingdom) Betty Nuthall	6	3	5
(United States) Budge Patty (United States) Pauline Betz	4	6	7
(Czechoslovakia) Jaroslav Drobný (Czechoslovakia) Helena Straubeová	2	2
(Australia) Jack Harper (United Kingdom) Mary Halford	6	6
(United Kingdom) Donald MacPhail (United Kingdom) Louise Anderson	8	6
(United Kingdom) Neil Cox (United Kingdom) Joy Cox	6	4
(United Kingdom) Guy Cooper (United Kingdom) Valerie Cooper	7	2
(Republic of Ireland) Cyril Kemp (United Kingdom) Betty Passingham	9	6
(France) Georges Gremillet (France) Jacqueline Marcellin	5	5
(United Kingdom) Bobby Meredith (United Kingdom) Elsa Haylock	7	7
(France) Christian Grandet (Netherlands) Joopy van der Wal	6	6
(United Kingdom) Peter Hare (United States) Katherine Winthrop	4	3
(France) Henri Pellizza (France) Nelly Landry	6	6
(Belgium) Jack Van den Eynde (United Kingdom) Effie Peters	1	4

Second round
(United Kingdom) C Kingsley (United Kingdom) P O'Connell	1	2
(United States) J Patty (United States) P Betz	6	6
(Australia) J Harper (United Kingdom) M Halford	6	6
(United Kingdom) D MacPhail (United Kingdom) L Anderson	2	2
(Republic of Ireland) C Kemp (United Kingdom) E Passingham	6	5	7
(United Kingdom) G Meredith (United Kingdom) E Haylock	3	7	5
(France) C Grandet (Netherlands) J van der Wal	2	9
(France) H Pellizza (France) N Landry	6	11

Third round
(United States) J Patty (United States) P Betz	6	6
(Australia) J Harper (United Kingdom) M Halford	2	3
(Republic of Ireland) C Kemp (United Kingdom) E Passingham
(France) H Pellizza (France) N Landry	w/o

Fourth round
(United States) J Patty (United States) P Betz	6	6
(Republic of Ireland) C Kemp (United Kingdom) E Passingham	1	4

==== Section 6 ====
First round

Second round
(France) Henri Bolelli (France) Micheline Inglebert	6	6
(United Kingdom) Herman David (United Kingdom) Jean Poynder	4	0
(Netherlands) Hubert Wilton (Netherlands) Nel Hermsen	6	3	6
(United Kingdom) Peter Young (United Kingdom) Joan Ingram	4	6	4
(Republic of Ireland) Henry Purcell (United Kingdom) Gertrude Valentine-Brown	6	3	6
(Belgium) Léopold de Borman (Belgium) Yvonne Vincart	4	6	2
(Switzerland) Jost Spitzer (Czechoslovakia) Edith Sutz	3	2
4	(Australia) Dinny Pails (United Kingdom) Kay Menzies	6	6

Third round
(France) H Bolelli (France) M Inglebert	6	6
(Netherlands) H Wilton (Netherlands) P Hermsen	3	2
(Republic of Ireland) H Purcell (United Kingdom) G Valentine-Brown	3	2
4	(Australia) D Pails (United Kingdom) K Menzies	6	6

Fourth round
(France) H Bolelli (France) M Inglebert	1	4
4	(Australia) D Pails (United Kingdom) K Menzies	6	6

==== Section 7 ====
First round

Second round
(United Kingdom) Don Butler (United Kingdom) Jean Bostock	6	6
(United Kingdom) GI Bayley (United Kingdom) Audrey Wenyon	2	0
(United Kingdom) Jimmy Jones (United Kingdom) Ermyntrude Harvey	6	4	6
(France) Jacques Thomas (France) Suzanne Pannetier	2	6	3
(Netherlands) Ivo Rinkel (Netherlands) Truid Blaisse	6	6
(United Kingdom) Tony Starte (United Kingdom) Madie Moss	1	0
(United Kingdom) John Olliff (United Kingdom) Joan Curry	6	6
(Poland) Ernest Wittmann (United Kingdom) Edith Middleton	3	4

Third round
(United Kingdom) D Butler (United Kingdom) J Bostock	6	6
(United Kingdom) C Jones (United Kingdom) E Harvey	1	2
(Netherlands) I Rinkel (Netherlands) G Blaisse	7	6
(United Kingdom) J Olliff (United Kingdom) J Curry	5	1

Fourth round
(United Kingdom) D Butler (United Kingdom) J Bostock	6	7
(Netherlands) I Rinkel (Netherlands) G Blaisse	2	5

==== Section 8 ====
First round

Second round
(Norway) Johan Haanes (Netherlands) Mrs LM Godefroy	4	5
(United Kingdom) Howard Walton (Poland) Joanna Russocki	6	7
(France) Bernard Destremau (United States) Pat Todd	6	7
(United Kingdom) Bobby Thorn (United Kingdom) Dorrit Herbst	1	5
(United Kingdom) Ted Avory (United Kingdom) Joan Strawson	4	4
(Belgium) Philippe Washer (Belgium) Josane de Meulemeester	6	6
(United Kingdom) Gwyn Tuckett (United Kingdom) Molly Lincoln	2	4
2	(Australia) Geoff Brown (United States) Dorothy Bundy	6	6

Third round
(United Kingdom) H Walton (Poland) J Russocki	2	2
(France) B Destremau (United States) P Todd	6	6
(Belgium) P Washer (Belgium) J de Meulemeester	3	4
2	(Australia) G Brown (United States) D Bundy	6	6

Fourth round
(France) B Destremau (United States) P Todd	2	1
2	(Australia) G Brown (United States) D Bundy	6	6
