= 1947 Wimbledon Championships – Women's singles =

Women's singles
- 1947 Wimbledon Championships

Final
- Champion: (United States) Margaret Osborne
- Runner-up: (United States) Doris Hart
- Score: 6–2, 6–4

Details
- Draw: 96 (10 Q )
- Seeds: 8

Events
Singles	men	women		boys	girls
Doubles	men	women	mixed	boys	girls
← 1946 ·	Wimbledon Championships	· 1948 →

Margaret Osborne defeated Doris Hart in the final, 6–2, 6–4 to win the ladies' singles tennis title at the 1946 Wimbledon Championships. Pauline Betz was the defending champion, but was ineligible to compete after turning professional.

== Seeds ==
1. (United States) Margaret Osborne (champion)
2. (United States) Louise Brough (semifinals)
3. (United States) Doris Hart (final)
4. (United States) Pat Todd (quarterfinals)
5. (Australia) Nancye Bolton (quarterfinals)
6. (United Kingdom) Kay Menzies (quarterfinals)
7. (South Africa) Sheila Summers (semifinals)
8. (United Kingdom) Jean Bostock (quarterfinals)

Click on the seed number of a player to go to their draw section.

== Draw ==
=== Key ===
- Q = Qualifier
- WC = Wild card
- LL = Lucky loser
- Alt = Alternate
- SE = Special exempt
- PR = Protected ranking
- ITF = ITF entry
- JE = Junior exempt
- w/o = Walkover
- r = Retired
- d = Defaulted
- SR = Special ranking

=== Finals ===
Quarterfinals
2	(United States) Louise Brough	6	6
5	(Australia) Nancye Bolton	2	3
3	(United States) Doris Hart	4	6	6
8	(United Kingdom) Jean Bostock	6	1	2
7	(South Africa) Sheila Summers	7	6
4	(United States) Pat Todd	5	4
6	(United Kingdom) Kay Menzies	2	4
1	(United States) Margaret Osborne	6	6

Semifinals
2	(United States) Louise Brough	6	6	4
3	(United States) Doris Hart	2	8	6
7	(South Africa) Sheila Summers	1	2
1	(United States) Margaret Osborne	6	6

Final
3	(United States) Doris Hart	2	4
1	(United States) Margaret Osborne	6	6

=== Top half ===
==== Section 1 ====
First round

Second round
2	(United States) Louise Brough	6	6
(United Kingdom) Nancy Glover	1	0
(United Kingdom) Jacqueline Fry	7	6	2
Q	(United Kingdom) Edna Pool	5	8	6
(Australia) Joan Bathurst	3	6	6
(United Kingdom) Susan Powell	6	2	1
(United Kingdom) Viola White	3	3
(United Kingdom) Phyllis Grover	6	6

Third round
2	(United States) L Brough	6	6
Q	(United Kingdom) E Pool	1	0
(Australia) J Bathurst	3	6	3
(United Kingdom) P Grover	6	4	6

Fourth round
2	(United States) L Brough	6	6
(United Kingdom) P Grover	0	1

==== Section 2 ====
First round

Second round
5	(Australia) Nancye Bolton	6	6
(United Kingdom) Joyce Coles	1	0
(United Kingdom) Betty Coutts	6	6
Q	(United Kingdom) Barbara Walton	1	2
(United Kingdom) Janet Morgan	6	1	6
(United Kingdom) Margaret Carlisle	3	6	4
(United Kingdom) Wendy Stork	3	6	6
(United Kingdom) Elsie Phillips	6	4	2

Third round
5	(Australia) N Bolton	6	6
(United Kingdom) B Coutts	1	1
(United Kingdom) J Morgan	0	1
(United Kingdom) W Stork	6	6

Fourth round
5	(Australia) N Bolton	6	6
(United Kingdom) W Stork	1	2

==== Section 3 ====
First round
3	(United States) Doris Hart	6	6
(South Africa) Dorothy Muller	1	1
(United Kingdom) Vera Dace	2	1
(United Kingdom) Mary Halford	6	6
(Sweden) Birgit Gullbrandsson	6	7
(United Kingdom) Pam Bocquet	1	5
(Netherlands) Madzy Couquerque	6	6
(France) Monique Hamelin	4	4
(Romania) Magda Rurac	6	6
(Australia) Alison Baker	4	0
Q	(United Kingdom) Nancy Liebert	2	3
(United Kingdom) Valerie Cooper	6	6
(United Kingdom) Pearl Panton	1	3
(United Kingdom) Peggy Dawson-Scott	6	6
(United Kingdom) Molly Blair	6	1	8
(United Kingdom) Bea Carris	3	6	10

Second round
3	(United States) D Hart	6	7
(United Kingdom) M Halford	0	5
(Sweden) B Gullbrandsson	6	6
(Netherlands) M Couquerque	3	4
(Romania) M Rurac	6	9
(United Kingdom) V Cooper	3	7
(United Kingdom) P Dawson-Scott	4	6	6
(United Kingdom) B Carris	6	4	2

Third round
3	(United States) D Hart	6	6
(Sweden) B Gullbrandsson	3	0
(Romania) M Rurac	7	6
(United Kingdom) P Dawson-Scott	5	2

Fourth round
3	(United States) D Hart	6	8
(Romania) M Rurac	4	6

==== Section 4 ====
First round
8	(United Kingdom) Jean Bostock	6	6
(Hungary) Zsuzsa Körmöczy	4	3
(Switzerland) Luzia Studer	1	3
(United Kingdom) Thelma Lister	6	6
(United Kingdom) Gladys Lines	6	6
(United Kingdom) Betty Wilford	4	3
(United Kingdom) Patsy O'Connell	4	3^{r}
(United Kingdom) Alex McKelvie	6	4
(United Kingdom) Madge Slaney	6	6
(United Kingdom) Dorrit Herbst	1	2
(United Kingdom) Joan Curry	6	6
Q	(United Kingdom) Pat Cowney	0	1
Q	(United Kingdom) Kay Tuckey	w/o
(Republic of Ireland) Betty Lombard
(United Kingdom) Phyllis King	6	6
(Belgium) Miriamme de Borman	2	4

Second round
8	(United Kingdom) J Bostock	6	6
(United Kingdom) T Lister	2	3
(United Kingdom) G Lines	6	7
(United Kingdom) A McKelvie	3	5
(United Kingdom) M Slaney	4	3
(United Kingdom) J Curry	6	6
(Republic of Ireland) B Lombard	6	0	6
(United Kingdom) P King	4	6	4

Third round
8	(United Kingdom) J Bostock	6	6
(United Kingdom) G Lines	3	1
(United Kingdom) J Curry	6	3	6
(Republic of Ireland) B Lombard	3	6	2

Fourth round
8	(United Kingdom) J Bostock	6	6
(United Kingdom) J Curry	3	3

=== Bottom half ===
==== Section 5 ====
First round
(Austria) Hilde Doleschell	6	8
(United Kingdom) Barbara Knapp	1	6
(United Kingdom) Joan Strawson	4	0
(Luxembourg) Alice Weiwers	6	6
(United Kingdom) Rosemary Morris	1	1
(United Kingdom) Audrey Osborne	6	6
(United Kingdom) Margot Parker	6	3	7
(United Kingdom) Billie Yorke	3	6	9
Q	(United Kingdom) Georgie Woodgate	6	6
(United Kingdom) Enid Sutton	0	1
(United Kingdom) Effie Peters	4	1
(United Kingdom) Jean Quertier	6	6
(United Kingdom) Edie Luxton	3	2
(United Kingdom) Elsie Hamilton	6	6
Q	(United Kingdom) Margaret Lewis	3	1
7	(South Africa) Sheila Summers	6	6

Second round
(Austria) H Doleschell	2	3
(Luxembourg) A Weiwers	6	6
(United Kingdom) A Osborne	8	7
(United Kingdom) B Yorke	6	5
Q	(United Kingdom) G Woodgate	3	6	3
(United Kingdom) J Quertier	6	3	6
(United Kingdom) E Hamilton	0	0
7	(South Africa) S Summers	6	6

Third round
(Luxembourg) A Weiwers	5	6	4
(United Kingdom) A Osborne	7	2	6
(United Kingdom) J Quertier	9	1
7	(South Africa) S Summers	11	6

Fourth round
(United Kingdom) A Osborne	5	1
7	(South Africa) S Summers	7	6

==== Section 6 ====
First round
(United Kingdom) Jean Walker-Smith	4	3
(United Kingdom) Betty Hilton	6	6
(Poland) Jadwiga Jędrzejowska	6	6
(United Kingdom) Peggy Knight	2	3
(United Kingdom) Joy Gannon
(France) Jacqueline Saladin	w/o
(United Kingdom) Denise Pritchard	4	2
(Mandatory Palestine) Gertrude Kornfeld	6	6
(United Kingdom) Joey David	1	1
(United Kingdom) Peggy Vivian	6	6
(Belgium) Josane de Meulemeester	6	6
Q	(United Kingdom) Lalage Churcher	0	1
(Czechoslovakia) Helena Straubeová	4	2
(United Kingdom) Anita Ellis	6	6
(United Kingdom) Hilary Morgan	3	0
4	(United States) Pat Todd	6	6

Second round
(United Kingdom) E Hilton	6	9
(Poland) J Jędrzejowska	4	7
(United Kingdom) J Gannon	6	6
(Mandatory Palestine) G Kornfeld	3	3
(United Kingdom) M Vivian	6	9
(Belgium) J de Meulemeester	4	7
(United Kingdom) A Ellis	3	2
4	(United States) P Todd	6	6

Third round
(United Kingdom) E Hilton	7	6
(United Kingdom) J Gannon	5	3
(United Kingdom) M Vivian	1	3
4	(United States) P Todd	6	6

Fourth round
(United Kingdom) E Hilton	1	2
4	(United States) P Todd	6	6

==== Section 7 ====
First round

Second round
(Hungary) Márta Peterdy	6	2
(United Kingdom) Gem Hoahing	8	6
(United Kingdom) Katherine Keith-Steele	3	0
(Australia) Nell Hopman	6	6
(United Kingdom) Edith Middleton	2	6
(United Kingdom) Patience Chapman	6	8
(Denmark) Milly Vagn-Nielsen	2	1
6	(United Kingdom) Kay Menzies	6	6

Third round
(United Kingdom) C Hoahing	4	2
(Australia) E Hopman	6	6
(United Kingdom) P Chapman	0	1
6	(United Kingdom) K Menzies	6	6

Fourth round
(Australia) E Hopman	2	2
6	(United Kingdom) K Menzies	6	6

==== Section 8 ====
First round

Second round
(Italy) Annelise Bossi	6	7
Q	(United Kingdom) Patsy Rogers	3	5
(United Kingdom) Joy Hibbert	6	2	1
(France) Colette Boegner	4	6	6
(United Kingdom) Sheila Kenyon	5	2
(United Kingdom) Penny Durlac	7	6
(United Kingdom) Gay Chandler	3	2
1	(United States) Margaret Osborne	6	6

Third round
(Italy) A Bossi	3	6	6
(France) C Boegner	6	3	3
(United Kingdom) P Durlac	3	0
1	(United States) M Osborne	6	6

Fourth round
(Italy) A Bossi	3	5
1	(United States) M Osborne	6	7

Preceded by 1947 French Championships – Women's singles	Grand Slam women's singles	Succeeded by 1947 U.S. National Championships – Women's singles
