= 1949 in tennis =

This page covers all the important events in the sport of tennis in 1949. It provides the results of notable tournaments throughout the year on both the men's and women's ILTF tennis circuits.

== Australian Open ==
Category	Champion(s)	Finalist(s)	Score
Men's singles	(Australia) Frank Sedgman	(Australia) John Bromwich	6–3, 6–2, 6–2
Women's singles	(United States) Doris Hart	(Australia) Nancye Wynne Bolton	6–3, 6–4
Men's doubles	(Australia) John Bromwich (Australia) Adrian Quist	(Australia) Geoff Brown (Australia) Bill Sidwell	6–8, 7–5, 6–2, 6–3
Women's doubles	(Australia) Thelma Coyne Long (Australia) Nancye Wynne Bolton	(United States) Doris Hart (Australia) Marie Toomey	6–0, 6–1
Mixed doubles	(United States) Doris Hart (Australia) Frank Sedgman	(Australia) Joyce Fitch (Australia) John Bromwich	6–1, 5–7, 12–10

== French Open ==
Category	Champion(s)	Finalist(s)	Score
Men's singles	(United States) Frank Parker	(United States) Budge Patty	6–3, 1–6, 6–1, 6–4
Women's singles	(United States) Margaret Osborne duPont	(France) Nelly Adamson	7–5, 6–2
Men's doubles	(United States) Pancho Gonzales (United States) Frank Parker	(South Africa) Eustace Fannin (South Africa) Eric Sturgess	6–3, 8–6, 5–7, 6–3
Women's doubles	(United States) Margaret Osborne duPont (United States) Louise Brough	(United Kingdom) Joy Gannon (United Kingdom) Betty Hilton	7–5, 6–1
Mixed doubles	(South Africa) Sheila Piercey Summers (South Africa) Eric Sturgess	(United Kingdom) Jean Quertier (United Kingdom) Gerry Oakley	6–1, 6–1

== Wimbledon ==
Category	Champion(s)	Finalist(s)	Score
Men's singles	(United States) Ted Schroeder	(Czechoslovakia) Jaroslav Drobný	3–6, 6–0, 6–3, 4–6, 6–4
Women's singles	(United States) Louise Brough	(United States) Margaret duPont	10–8, 1–6, 10–8
Men's doubles	(United States) Pancho Gonzales (United States) Frank Parker	(United States) Gardnar Mulloy (United States) Ted Schroeder	6–4, 6–4, 6–2
Women's doubles	(United States) Louise Brough (United States) Margaret duPont	(United States) Gussie Moran (United States) Pat Todd	8–6, 7–5
Mixed doubles	(South Africa) Eric Sturgess (South Africa) Sheila Summers	(Australia) John Bromwich (United States) Louise Brough	9–7, 9–11, 7–5

== US Open ==
Category	Champion(s)	Finalist(s)	Score
Men's singles	(United States) Pancho Gonzales	(United States) Ted Schroeder	16–18, 2–6, 6–1, 6–2, 6–4
Women's singles	(United States) Margaret Osborne duPont	(United States) Doris Hart	6–4, 6–1
Men's doubles	(Australia) John Bromwich (Australia) Bill Sidwell	(Australia) Frank Sedgman (Australia) George Worthington	6–4, 6–0, 6–1
Women's doubles	(United States) Louise Brough (United States) Margaret Osborne duPont	(United States) Shirley Fry (United States) Doris Hart	6–4, 10–8
Mixed doubles	(United States) Louise Brough (South Africa) Eric Sturgess	(United States) Margaret Osborne duPont (United States) Bill Talbert	4–6, 6–3, 7–5
