= 1949 Wimbledon Championships – Mixed doubles =

Mixed doubles
- 1949 Wimbledon Championships

Final
- Champions: (South Africa) Eric Sturgess (South Africa) Sheila Summers
- Runners-up: (Australia) John Bromwich (United States) Louise Brough
- Score: 9–7, 9–11, 7–5

Details
- Draw: 80 (5Q)
- Seeds: 4

Events
Singles	men	women		boys	girls
Doubles	men	women	mixed	boys	girls
- Wimbledon Championships

Eric Sturgess and Sheila Summers defeated the defending champions John Bromwich and Louise Brough in the final, 9–7, 9–11, 7–5 to win the mixed doubles tennis title at the 1949 Wimbledon Championships.

== Seeds ==
1. (Australia) John Bromwich / (United States) Louise Brough (final)
2. (Australia) Bill Sidwell / (United States) Margaret Osborne (semifinals)
3. (United States) Bob Falkenburg / (United States) Gussie Moran (withdrew)
4. (South Africa) Eric Sturgess / (South Africa) Sheila Summers (champions)

Click on the seed number of a player to go to their draw section.

== Draw ==
Key

- Q = Qualifier
- WC = Wild card
- LL = Lucky loser
- Alt = Alternate
- ITF = ITF entry
- PR = Protected ranking
- SR = Special ranking
- SE = Special exempt
- JE = Junior exempt
- JR = Junior Accelerator Programme entrant
- CO = College Accelerator Programme entrant
- NG = Next Gen Accelerator Program entrant
- w/o = Walkover
- r = Retired
- d = Defaulted

=== Finals ===
Quarterfinals
1	(Australia) John Bromwich (United States) Louise Brough	3	9	6
(United Kingdom) Geoffrey Paish (United Kingdom) Jean Quertier	6	7	0
(Sweden) Torsten Johansson (Sweden) Birgit Gullbrandsson	7	1
(Australia) George Worthington (Australia) Thelma Long	9	6
(Australia) Geoff Brown (Australia) Joyce Fitch	6	4	3
4	(South Africa) Eric Sturgess (South Africa) Sheila Summers	3	6	6
(United Kingdom) Tony Mottram (United Kingdom) Joy Gannon	1	4
2	(Australia) Bill Sidwell (United States) Margaret duPont	6	6

Semifinals
1	(Australia) John Bromwich (United States) Louise Brough	6	6
(Australia) George Worthington (Australia) Thelma Long	1	2
4	(South Africa) Eric Sturgess (South Africa) Sheila Summers	6	7	6
2	(Australia) Bill Sidwell (United States) Margaret duPont	4	9	3

Final
1	(Australia) John Bromwich (United States) Louise Brough	7	11	5
4	(South Africa) Eric Sturgess (South Africa) Sheila Summers	9	9	7

=== Top half ===
==== Section 1 ====
First round

Second round
1	(Australia) John Bromwich (United States) Louise Brough	6	6
(India) Subba Sawhney (United Kingdom) Jean Walker-Smith	0	0
(New Zealand) Dennis Coombe (United Kingdom) Molly Blair
(Hungary) Kálmán Fehér (Hungary) Zsuzsa Körmöczy	w/o
(Norway) Thorgny Haanes (United States) Virginia Boyer	4	0
(Republic of Ireland) George McVeagh (United Kingdom) Gay Chandler	6	6
(United Kingdom) Don Butler (United Kingdom) Betty Hilton	6	5	6
(Socialist Federal Republic of Yugoslavia) Franjo Punčec (Belgium) Francine Isaac	3	7	1

Third round
1	(Australia) J Bromwich (United States) L Brough	6	6
(New Zealand) D Coombe (United Kingdom) M Blair	2	2
(Republic of Ireland) George McVeagh (United Kingdom) G Chandler	2	5
(United Kingdom) D Butler (United Kingdom) E Hilton	6	7

Fourth round
1	(Australia) J Bromwich (United States) L Brough	6	6
(United Kingdom) D Butler (United Kingdom) E Hilton	0	3

==== Section 2 ====
First round

Second round
(Republic of Ireland) Cyril Kemp (Republic of Ireland) Betty Lombard	6	6	4
(Egypt) Adli El Shafei (South Africa) Betsy Venter	0	8	6
(Austria) Hans Redl (Austria) Hilde Doleschell	6	2	2
(Chile) Ricardo Balbiers (United States) Shirley Fry	4	6	6
(United Kingdom) Geoffrey Paish (United Kingdom) Jean Quertier	6	6
(Egypt) Stephen Nimr (United Kingdom) Freda Hammersley	0	2
(United Kingdom) Claude Lister (United Kingdom) Effie Peters	7	6
(United Kingdom) Gerry Oakley (United Kingdom) Patsy Rodgers	5	3

Third round
(Egypt) A El Shafei (South Africa) B Venter	6	4
(Chile) R Balbiers (United States) S Fry	8	6
(United Kingdom) G Paish (United Kingdom) J Quertier	6	6
(United Kingdom) C Lister (United Kingdom) E Peters	2	3

Fourth round
(Chile) R Balbiers (United States) S Fry	4	1
(United Kingdom) G Paish (United Kingdom) J Quertier	6	6

==== Section 3 ====
First round

Second round
3	(United States) Bob Falkenburg (United States) Gussie Moran	w/o
(Argentina) Heraldo Weiss (Argentina) Mary Terán de Weiss
(United Kingdom) Laurie Proctor (United Kingdom) Nathalie Feiron	6	4	6
(Egypt) Eddie Mandelbaum (Spain) María Josefa de Riba	3	6	4
(Sweden) Torsten Johansson (Sweden) Birgit Gullbrandsson	3	6	8
(Belgium) Pierre Geelhand de Merxem (United Kingdom) Joy Hibbert	6	4	6
(United Kingdom) GI Bayley (United Kingdom) Betty Coutts	3	6	3
(France) Paul Rémy (France) Nelly Adamson	6	3	6

Third round
(Argentina) H Weiss (Argentina) M Terán de Weiss	6	6
(United Kingdom) L Proctor (United Kingdom) N Feiron	2	4
(Sweden) T Johansson (Sweden) B Gullbrandsson	6	5	6
(France) P Rémy (France) N Adamson	4	7	3

Fourth round
(Argentina) H Weiss (Argentina) M Terán de Weiss	3	7	5
(Sweden) T Johansson (Sweden) B Gullbrandsson	6	5	7

==== Section 4 ====
First round
(France) Robert Abdesselam (France) Anne-Marie Seghers	3	3
(Australia) Frank Sedgman (United Kingdom) Kay Menzies	6	6
(United Kingdom) Headley Baxter (United Kingdom) Peggy Dawson-Scott	6	6	10
(France) Christian Grandet (United States) Arvilla McGuire	8	1	8
(Socialist Federal Republic of Yugoslavia) Dragutin Mitić (Netherlands) Nel Hermsen	6	6
(New Zealand) Buster Andrews (United Kingdom) Phyllis King	1	0
Q	(United Kingdom) Warwick Shute (United Kingdom) Laura Morgan	2	4
(South Africa) Nigel Cockburn (South Africa) Toots Watermeyer	6	6
(Poland) Ernest Wittmann (United Kingdom) Billie Woodgate	6	3	7
Q	(South Africa) David Samaai (Egypt) Meg Buxton-Knight	4	6	5
(Switzerland) Hans Huonder (Czechoslovakia) Edith Sutz	2	4
(United Kingdom) Herman David (United Kingdom) Nancy Glover	6	6
(Denmark) Bent Koželuh (United Kingdom) Gladys Lines	2	1
(Australia) George Worthington (Australia) Thelma Long	6	6
(France) Robert Colin (France) Jacqueline Boutin	6	6
Q	(United Kingdom) Mike Lloyd (United Kingdom) Joey David	2	4

Second round
(Australia) F Sedgman (United Kingdom) K Menzies	6	6
(United Kingdom) H Baxter (United Kingdom) P Dawson-Scott	4	3
(Socialist Federal Republic of Yugoslavia) D Mitić (Netherlands) P Hermsen	4	4
(South Africa) N Cockburn (South Africa) E Watermeyer	6	6
(Poland) E Wittmann (United Kingdom) R Woodgate	6	7
(United Kingdom) H David (United Kingdom) N Glover	3	5
(Australia) G Worthington (Australia) T Long
(France) R Colin (France) J Boutin

Third round
(Australia) F Sedgman (United Kingdom) K Menzies	6	6
(South Africa) N Cockburn (South Africa) E Watermeyer	1	4
(Poland) E Wittmann (United Kingdom) R Woodgate	3	2
(Australia) G Worthington (Australia) T Long	6	6

Fourth round
(Australia) F Sedgman (United Kingdom) K Menzies	6	4	8
(Australia) G Worthington (Australia) T Long	3	6	10

=== Bottom half ===
==== Section 5 ====
First round
(United Kingdom) Douglas Snart (United Kingdom) Wendy Stork	4	1
(Czechoslovakia) Milan Matouš (Czechoslovakia) Helena Straubeová	6	6
(United Kingdom) Roland Carter (United Kingdom) Enid Andrews	3	3
(Switzerland) René Buser (Switzerland) Violette Rigollet	6	6
(France) Jean Borotra (France) Colette Boegner	6	6
(Spain) Jaime Bartroli (Spain) MI Maier	0	4
(United Kingdom) Tim Lewis (United Kingdom) Georgie Woodgate	6	6
(Egypt) Mahmoud Talaat (Egypt) Georgina Greiss	3	4
(Australia) Geoff Brown (Australia) Joyce Fitch
(Poland) Władysław Skonecki (United Kingdom) Louise Anderson	w/o
Q	(United Kingdom) Leslie Cater (United Kingdom) Leonie Brighton	6	6	6
(United Kingdom) Paddy Roberts (United Kingdom) Joan Curry	2	8	4
(United Kingdom) Henry Billington (United Kingdom) Susan Billington	7	6
(United Kingdom) Roy Mansell (United Kingdom) Edith Middleton	5	4
Q	(United Kingdom) Peter Hare (United Kingdom) Elsie Phillips	6	3	2
(Australia) Alan Coldham (United Kingdom) Patsy O'Connell	1	6	6

Second round
(Czechoslovakia) M Matouš (Czechoslovakia) H Straubeová	6	6
(Switzerland) R Buser (Switzerland) V Rigollet	4	4
(France) J Borotra (France) C Boegner	6	12
(United Kingdom) N Lewis (United Kingdom) G Woodgate	4	10
(Australia) G Brown (Australia) J Fitch	6	6
Q	(United Kingdom) L Cater (United Kingdom) L Brighton	2	3
(United Kingdom) H Billington (United Kingdom) S Billington	3	5
(Australia) A Coldham (United Kingdom) P O'Connell	6	7

Third round
(Czechoslovakia) M Matouš (Czechoslovakia) H Straubeová	8	8
(France) J Borotra (France) C Boegner	6	6
(Australia) G Brown (Australia) J Fitch	6	7
(Australia) A Coldham (United Kingdom) P O'Connell	2	5

Fourth round
(Czechoslovakia) M Matouš (Czechoslovakia) H Straubeová	0	4
(Australia) G Brown (Australia) J Fitch	6	6

==== Section 6 ====
First round

Second round
(United Kingdom) Derek Bull (United Kingdom) Betty Wilford	5	6	13
(Egypt) Marcel Coen (Belgium) Miriamme de Borman	7	3	11
(Philippines) Felicisimo Ampon (United States) Gloria Butler	6	6
(France) Jacques Thomas (France) Jacqueline Marcellin	2	1
(United Kingdom) John Fulton (United Kingdom) Lesley Fulton	4	4
(South Africa) Eustace Fannin (United States) Helen Rihbany	6	6
(United Kingdom) Tommy Anderson (United Kingdom) Gem Hoahing	2	2
4	(South Africa) Eric Sturgess (South Africa) Sheila Summers	6	6

Third round
(United Kingdom) D Bull (United Kingdom) E Wilford	6	4	1
(Philippines) F Ampon (United States) G Butler	2	6	6
(South Africa) E Fannin (United States) H Rihbany	2	1
4	(South Africa) E Sturgess (South Africa) S Summers	6	6

Fourth round
(Philippines) F Ampon (United States) G Butler	3	2
4	(South Africa) E Sturgess (South Africa) S Summers	6	6

==== Section 7 ====
First round

Second round
(Poland) Czesław Spychała (United Kingdom) Bea Carris	6	3	3
(United Kingdom) Tony Mottram (United Kingdom) Joy Gannon	4	6	6
(United Kingdom) Cliff Hovell (United States) Rita Anderson	5	6	3
(Italy) Marcello del Bello (Italy) Annelise Bossi	7	3	6
(Poland) Ignacy Tłoczyński (Kenya) Sheila Dowdeswell	3	6
(Romania) Alexandru Hamburger (United Kingdom) Kay Tuckey	6	8
(United Kingdom) Guy Cooper (Sweden) Mary Lagerborg	1	1
(Norway) Nils-Erik Hessen (Norway) Laila Schou Nilsen	6	6

Third round
(United Kingdom) A Mottram (United Kingdom) J Gannon	6	6
(Italy) M del Bello (Italy) A Bossi	2	2
(Romania) A Hamburger (United Kingdom) K Tuckey	6	2	6
(Norway) N-E Hessen (Norway) L Schou Nilsen	3	6	4

Fourth round
(United Kingdom) A Mottram (United Kingdom) J Gannon	6	4	7
(Romania) A Hamburger (United Kingdom) K Tuckey	2	6	5

==== Section 8 ====
First round

Second round
(South Africa) Sydney Levy (United Kingdom) Molly Stone	3	4
(Netherlands) Hans van Swol (United Kingdom) Mary Halford	6	6
(Hungary) Dezső Vad (Hungary) Márta Peterdy-Wolf	w/o
(United States) Earl Cochell (United States) Pat Todd
(Republic of Ireland) Guy Jackson (Republic of Ireland) Mary Fitzgibbon	6	4	5
(Denmark) Erik Bjerre (Denmark) Eva Fog	3	6	7
(United Kingdom) Bobby Meredith (United Kingdom) Natalie Gourlay	0	0
2	(Australia) Bill Sidwell (United States) Margaret duPont	6	6

Third round
(Netherlands) A van Swol (United Kingdom) M Halford	1	2
(United States) E Cochell (United States) P Todd	6	6
(Denmark) E Bjerre (Denmark) E Fog	2	1
2	(Australia) W Sidwell (United States) M duPont	6	6

Fourth round
(United States) E Cochell (United States) P Todd	4	6	3
2	(Australia) W Sidwell (United States) M duPont	6	3	6
