= 1946 Wimbledon Championships – Women's doubles =

Women's doubles
- 1946 Wimbledon Championships

Final
- Champions: (United States) Louise Brough (United States) Margaret Osborne
- Runners-up: (United States) Pauline Betz (United States) Doris Hart
- Score: 6–3, 2–6, 6–3

Details
- Draw: 48
- Seeds: 4

Events
Singles	men	women		boys	girls
Doubles	men	women	mixed	boys	girls
← 1939 ·	Wimbledon Championships	· 1947 →

Sarah Fabyan and Alice Marble were the defending champion, but were ineligible to compete after turning professional.

Louise Brough and Margaret Osborne defeated Pauline Betz and Doris Hart in the final, 6–3, 2–6, 6–3 to win the ladies' doubles tennis title at the 1946 Wimbledon Championships.

== Seeds ==
1. (United States) Louise Brough / (United States) Margaret Osborne (champions)
2. (United States) Pauline Betz / (United States) Doris Hart (final)
3. (United Kingdom) Jean Bostock / (United Kingdom) Kay Menzies (semifinals)
4. (United States) Dorothy Bundy / (United States) Pat Todd (semifinals)

Click on the seed number of a player to go to their draw section.

== Draw ==
=== Key ===
- Q = Qualifier
- WC = Wild card
- LL = Lucky loser
- Alt = Alternate
- SE = Special exempt
- PR = Protected ranking
- ITF = ITF entry
- JE = Junior exempt
- w/o = Walkover
- r = Retired
- d = Defaulted
- SR = Special ranking

=== Finals ===
Quarterfinals
2	(United States) Pauline Betz (United States) Doris Hart	6	6
(France) Simonne Mathieu (United Kingdom) Billie Yorke	4	2
3	(United Kingdom) Jean Bostock (United Kingdom) Kay Menzies	6	6
(France) Simone Lafargue (United Kingdom) Vera Dace	1	1
(United Kingdom) Betty Nuthall (United Kingdom) Peggy Vivian	2	3
4	(United States) Dorothy Bundy (United States) Pat Todd	6	6
(United Kingdom) Molly Lincoln (United Kingdom) Betty Passingham	1	1
1	(United States) Louise Brough (United States) Margaret Osborne	6	6

Semifinals
2	(United States) Pauline Betz (United States) Doris Hart	3	6	6
3	(United Kingdom) Jean Bostock (United Kingdom) Kay Menzies	6	3	4
4	(United States) Dorothy Bundy (United States) Pat Todd	4	2
1	(United States) Louise Brough (United States) Margaret Osborne	6	6

Final
2	(United States) Pauline Betz (United States) Doris Hart	3	6	3
1	(United States) Louise Brough (United States) Margaret Osborne	6	2	6

=== Top half ===
==== Section 1 ====
First round

Second round
2	(United States) Pauline Betz (United States) Doris Hart	7	6
(United Kingdom) Joan Ingram (United Kingdom) Jean Quertier	5	4
(United Kingdom) Molly James (United Kingdom) Nancy Liebert	6	6
(Jamaica) Babs Lermitte (United Kingdom) Patsy Rodgers	3	3
(United Kingdom) Joy Gannon (United Kingdom) Nancy Glover	w/o
(United Kingdom) Betty Coutts (United Kingdom) Pearl Panton
(United Kingdom) Margaret Lewis (United Kingdom) Eileen Porter	7	2
(France) Simonne Mathieu (United Kingdom) Billie Yorke	9	6

Third round
2	(United States) P Betz (United States) D Hart	6	6
(United Kingdom) M James (United Kingdom) N Liebert	4	0
(United Kingdom) B Coutts (United Kingdom) P Panton	6	6	1
(France) S Mathieu (United Kingdom) B Yorke	8	4	6

Quarterfinals
2	(United States) P Betz (United States) D Hart	6	6
(France) S Mathieu (United Kingdom) B Yorke	4	2

==== Section 2 ====
First round
3	(United Kingdom) Jean Bostock (United Kingdom) Kay Stammers	7	6
(United Kingdom) Mary Halford (United Kingdom) Patsy O'Connell	5	1
(United Kingdom) Gem Hoahing (United Kingdom) Yvonne Law	3	7	4
(United Kingdom) Gay Chandler (United Kingdom) Betty Couper	6	5	6
(Netherlands) Truid Blaisse (Netherlands) Madzy Couquerque	7	3	6
(United Kingdom) Bea Carris (Belgium) Josane de Meulemeester	5	6	3
(United Kingdom) Dorrit Herbst (Czechoslovakia) Liesl Herbst	3	3
(United Kingdom) Valerie Cooper (United Kingdom) Margot Parker	6	6
(United Kingdom) Audrey Osborne (United Kingdom) Gertrude Valentine-Brown	6	7
(France) Micheline Inglebert (France) Jacqueline Marcellin	2	5
(United States) Mary Belin (United States) Katherine Winthrop	6	5	6
(United Kingdom) Gladys Lines (United Kingdom) Audrey Roberts	3	7	2
(France) Simone Lafargue (United Kingdom) Vera Dace	6	6
(United Kingdom) Peggy Knight (United Kingdom) Enid Sutton	3	4
(United Kingdom) Penny Durlac (United Kingdom) Joan Strawson	6	6
(United Kingdom) Joey David (Poland) Joanna Russocki	3	1

Second round
3	(United Kingdom) J Bostock (United Kingdom) K Menzies	6	6
(United Kingdom) G Chandler (United Kingdom) B Couper	3	3
(Netherlands) G Blaisse (Netherlands) M Couquerque	5	9	6
(United Kingdom) V Cooper (United Kingdom) M Parker	7	7	2
(United Kingdom) A Osborne (United Kingdom) G Valentine-Brown	6	6
(United States) M Belin (United States) K Winthrop	2	2
(France) S Lafargue (United Kingdom) V Dace	6	6
(United Kingdom) P Durlac (United Kingdom) J Strawson	4	3

Third round
2	(United Kingdom) J Bostock (United Kingdom) K Menzies	6	6
(Netherlands) G Blaisse (Netherlands) M Couquerque	2	3
(United Kingdom) A Osborne (United Kingdom) G Valentine-Brown	6	2
(France) S Lafargue (United Kingdom) V Dace	8	6

Quarterfinals
3	(United Kingdom) J Bostock (United Kingdom) K Menzies	6	6
(France) S Lafargue (United Kingdom) V Dace	1	1

==== Section 3 ====
First round
(France) Colette Boegner (France) Nelly Landry	6	6
(Netherlands) Nel Hermsen (Netherlands) Joopy van der Wal	3	2
(United Kingdom) Edie Luxton (United Kingdom) Nancy Macpherson-Grant	2	6	6
(Belgium) Yvonne Vincart (Belgium) Miriamme de Borman	6	0	3
(United Kingdom) ID Edwards (Denmark) Milly Vagn-Nielsen	w/o
(Poland) Jadwiga Jędrzejowska (United Kingdom) Effie Peters
(United Kingdom) Freda Hammersley (United Kingdom) Betty Hilton	w/o
(United Kingdom) Betty Nuthall (United Kingdom) Peggy Vivian
(United Kingdom) Ermyntrude Harvey (United Kingdom) Susan Powell	4	4
(United Kingdom) Alex McKelvie (United Kingdom) Jean Poynder	6	6
(United Kingdom) Doris Heppenstall (United Kingdom) Mrs CH Wright	6	6
(United Kingdom) Janet Morgan (United Kingdom) Wendy Stork	2	2
(United Kingdom) Margaret Mellows (United Kingdom) Rosemary Mobbs	6	6
(United Kingdom) Sonia Mavrogordato (United Kingdom) Madie Moss	3	3
(France) Suzanne Pannetier (France) Jacqueline Patorni	4	3
4	(United States) Dorothy Bundy (United States) Pat Todd	6	6

Second round
(France) C Boegner (France) N Landry	7	6
(United Kingdom) E Luxton (United Kingdom) N Macpherson-Grant	5	2
(Poland) J Jędrzejowska (United Kingdom) E Peters	2	4
(United Kingdom) B Nuthall (United Kingdom) M Vivian	6	6
(United Kingdom) A McKelvie (United Kingdom) J Poynder	6	6
(United Kingdom) D Heppenstall (United Kingdom) Mrs CH Wright	4	4
(United Kingdom) M Mellows (United Kingdom) R Mobbs	3	0
4	(United States) D Bundy (United States) P Todd	6	6

Third round
(France) C Boegner (France) N Landry	2	4
(United Kingdom) B Nuthall (United Kingdom) M Vivian	6	6
(United Kingdom) A McKelvie (United Kingdom) J Poynder	3	3
4	(United States) D Bundy (United States) P Todd	6	6

Quarterfinals
(United Kingdom) B Nuthall (United Kingdom) M Vivian	2	3
4	(United States) D Bundy (United States) P Todd	6	6

==== Section 4 ====
First round

Second round
(United Kingdom) Billie Woodgate (United Kingdom) Georgie Woodgate	3	3
(United Kingdom) Molly Lincoln (United Kingdom) Betty Passingham	6	6
(United Kingdom) Peggy Dawson-Scott (United Kingdom) Thelma Jarvis	6	6
(United Kingdom) Mildred Freeman (United Kingdom) Gladys Southam	1	4
(United Kingdom) Sheila Kenyon (United Kingdom) Sally Lister	6	6
A Massie; DL Mollison	2	1
(United Kingdom) Elsa Haylock (United Kingdom) Betty Uber	2	0
1	(United States) Louise Brough (United States) Margaret Osborne	6	6

Third round
(United Kingdom) M Lincoln (United Kingdom) E Passingham	6	4	6
(United Kingdom) P Dawson-Scott (United Kingdom) T Jarvis	4	6	4
(United Kingdom) S Kenyon (United Kingdom) S Lister	0	0
1	(United States) L Brough (United States) M Osborne	6	6

Quarterfinals
(United Kingdom) M Lincoln (United Kingdom) E Passingham	1	1
1	(United States) L Brough (United States) M Osborne	6	6	1

The nationalities of Miss A Massie and Miss DL Mollison are unknown.
