= 1946 Wightman Cup =

Women's tennis

Details
- Edition: 18th

Champion
- Winning nation: United States

The 1946 Wightman Cup was the 18th edition of the annual women's team tennis competition between the United States and Great Britain. It was held at the All England Lawn Tennis and Croquet Club in London in England in the United Kingdom.

Great Britain
0
All England Lawn Tennis and Croquet Club, London, England, United Kingdom
1946
Grass

United States
7

			1	2	3
1	(United Kingdom) (United States)	Jean Bostock; Pauline Betz	2; 6	4; 6
2	(United Kingdom) (United States)	Jean Bostock; Margaret Osborne	1; 6	4; 6
3	(United Kingdom) (United States)	Kay Stammers Menzies; Margaret Osborne	3; 6	2; 6
4	(United Kingdom) (United States)	Joan Curry; Louise Brough	6; 8	3; 6
5	(United Kingdom) (United States)	Kay Stammers Menzies; Pauline Betz	4; 6	4; 6
6	(United Kingdom) (United States)	Jean Bostock / Mary Halford; Margaret Osborne / Louise Brough	2; 6	1; 6
7	(United Kingdom) (United States)	Betty Passingham / Molly Lincoln; Pauline Betz / Doris Hart	1; 6	3; 6
