= 1948 Wimbledon Championships – Women's doubles =

Women's doubles
- 1948 Wimbledon Championships

Final
- Champions: (United States) Louise Brough (United States) Margaret duPont
- Runners-up: (United States) Doris Hart (United States) Pat Todd
- Score: 6–3, 3–6, 6–3

Details
- Draw: 40 (5 Q )
- Seeds: 4

Events
| Singles | men | women | | boys | girls |
| Doubles | men | women | mixed | boys | girls |
| ← 1947 · | Wimbledon Championships | · 1949 → |

Louise Brough and Margaret duPont defeated the defending champions Doris Hart and Pat Todd in the final, 6–3, 3–6, 6–3 to win the ladies' doubles tennis title at the 1948 Wimbledon Championships.

== Seeds ==
1. (United States) Louise Brough / (United States) Margaret duPont (champions)
2. (United States) Doris Hart / (United States) Pat Todd (final)
3. (United Kingdom) Molly Blair / (United Kingdom) Jean Bostock (semifinals)
4. (United Kingdom) Betty Hilton / (United Kingdom) Kay Menzies (third round)

Click on the seed number of a player to go to their draw section.

== Draw ==
=== Key ===
- Q = Qualifier
- WC = Wild card
- LL = Lucky loser
- Alt = Alternate
- SE = Special exempt
- PR = Protected ranking
- ITF = ITF entry
- JE = Junior exempt
- w/o = Walkover
- r = Retired
- d = Defaulted
- SR = Special ranking

=== Finals ===
Quarterfinals
1 | (United States) Louise Brough (United States) Margaret duPont | 6 | 6
(France) Colette Boegner (France) Nelly Landry | 0 | 1
(United States) Helen Rihbany (United States) Barbara Scofield | 6 | 6
(United Kingdom) Mary Halford (United Kingdom) Bea Walter | 2 | 2
(United Kingdom) Gem Hoahing (United Kingdom) Audrey Osborne | 1 | 6 | 2
3 | (United Kingdom) Molly Blair (United Kingdom) Jean Bostock | 6 | 2 | 6
(Republic of Ireland) Mary Fitzgibbon (Republic of Ireland) Betty Lombard | 1 | 1
2 | (United States) Doris Hart (United States) Pat Todd | 6 | 6

Semifinals
1 | (United States) Louise Brough (United States) Margaret duPont | 7 | 6
(United States) Helen Rihbany (United States) Barbara Scofield | 5 | 0
3 | (United Kingdom) Molly Blair (United Kingdom) Jean Bostock | 4 | 6
2 | (United States) Doris Hart (United States) Pat Todd | 6 | 8

Final
1 | (United States) Louise Brough (United States) Margaret duPont | 6 | 3 | 6
2 | (United States) Doris Hart (United States) Pat Todd | 3 | 6 | 3

=== Top half ===
==== Section 1 ====
First round

Second round
1 | (United States) Louise Brough (United States) Margaret duPont | 6 | 6
Q | (United Kingdom) Joyce Coles (United Kingdom) Kay Tuckey | 0 | 2
(Netherlands) Truid Blaisse-Terwindt (Netherlands) Tineke Lubbers-Fischer | 3 | 2
(South Africa) Dorothy Muller (South Africa) Sheila Summers | 6 | 6
Q | (United Kingdom) Valerie Cooper (United Kingdom) Margot Parker | 4 | 1
(France) Colette Boegner (France) Nelly Landry | 6 | 6
(Austria) Hilde Doleschell (Czechoslovakia) Edith Sutz | 4 | 6
Q | (Kenya) Sheila Dowdeswell (United Kingdom) Gladys Lines | 6 | 8

Third round
1 | (United States) L Brough (United States) M duPont | 6 | 6
(South Africa) D Muller (South Africa) S Summers | 2 | 4
(France) C Boegner (France) N Landry | 6 | 4 | 6
Q | (Kenya) S Dowdeswell (United Kingdom) G Lines | 3 | 6 | 3

Quarterfinals
1 | (United States) L Brough (United States) M duPont | 6 | 6
(France) C Boegner (France) N Landry | 0 | 1

==== Section 2 ====
First round
(United Kingdom) Effie Peters (United Kingdom) Billie Yorke | 4 | 4
(United Kingdom) Mary Halford (United Kingdom) Bea Walter | 6 | 6
(Hungary) Zsuzsa Körmöczy (Hungary) Márta Peterdy | 6 | 6
Q | (United Kingdom) Noelle Knight (United Kingdom) Nancy Liebert | 4 | 4
(United States) Gloria Butler (United States) Argyll Rice | 3 | 6 | 11
(United Kingdom) Joey David (Czechoslovakia) Olga Mišková | 6 | 3 | 9
(United Kingdom) Betty Wilford (United Kingdom) Georgie Woodgate | 7 | 6
(Republic of Ireland) Roguie Bain (Republic of Ireland) Maeve Brennan | 5 | 2

Second round
4 | (United Kingdom) Betty Hilton (United Kingdom) Kay Menzies | 6 | 6
(United Kingdom) Penny Durlac (United Kingdom) Patsy O'Connell | 2 | 2
(United States) Helen Rihbany (United States) Barbara Scofield | 6 | 3 | 6
(United Kingdom) Enid Andrews (United Kingdom) Patsy Rodgers | 1 | 6 | 1
(United Kingdom) M Halford (United Kingdom) B Walter | 6 | 6
(Hungary) Z Körmöczy (Hungary) M Peterdy | 0 | 1
(United States) G Butler (United States) A Rice | 3 | 3
(United Kingdom) E Wilford (United Kingdom) G Woodgate | 6 | 6

Third round
4 | (United Kingdom) E Hilton (United Kingdom) K Menzies | 4 | 7 | 6
(United States) H Rihbany (United States) B Scofield | 6 | 5 | 2
(United Kingdom) M Halford (United Kingdom) B Walter | 6 | 6
(United Kingdom) E Wilford (United Kingdom) G Woodgate | 4 | 3

Quarterfinals
(United States) H Rihbany (United States) B Scofield | 6 | 6
(United Kingdom) M Halford (United Kingdom) B Walter | 2 | 2

=== Bottom half ===
==== Section 3 ====
First round
(United Kingdom) Ermyntrude Harvey (United Kingdom) Audrey Roberts | 7 | 3 | 0
(Italy) Annelise Bossi (Argentina) Mary Terán de Weiss | 5 | 6 | 6
(United Kingdom) Gem Hoahing (United Kingdom) Audrey Osborne | 6 | 6
(Denmark) Lisa Andersen (Norway) Laila Schou Nilsen | 0 | 3
(Netherlands) Madzy Couquerque (Luxembourg) Alice Weiwers | 2 | 2
(United Kingdom) Joy Gannon (United Kingdom) Jean Quertier | 6 | 6
(Belgium) Miriamme de Borman (Belgium) Josane de Meulemeester | 0 | 2
(United States) Shirley Fry (United States) Mary Prentiss | 6 | 6

Second round
(Italy) A Bossi (Argentina) M Terán de Weiss | 3 | 4
(United Kingdom) C Hoahing (United Kingdom) A Osborne | 6 | 6
(United Kingdom) J Gannon (United Kingdom) J Quertier | 6 | 1 | 4
(United States) S Fry (United States) M Prentiss | 3 | 6 | 6
Q | (United Kingdom) Valerie Miles (United Kingdom) Janet Morgan
(United States) Margaret Cary (United Kingdom) Vera Thomas | w/o
(United Kingdom) Betty Passingham (United Kingdom) Jean Walker-Smith | 2 | 6
3 | (United Kingdom) Molly Blair (United Kingdom) Jean Bostock | 6 | 8

Third round
(United Kingdom) C Hoahing (United Kingdom) A Osborne
(United States) S Fry (United States) M Prentiss | w/o
Q | (United Kingdom) V Miles (United Kingdom) J Morgan | 5 | 6
3 | (United Kingdom) M Blair (United Kingdom) J Bostock | 7 | 8

Quarterfinals
(United Kingdom) C Hoahing (United Kingdom) A Osborne | 1 | 6 | 2
3 | (United Kingdom) M Blair (United Kingdom) J Bostock | 6 | 2 | 6

==== Section 4 ====
First round

Second round
(United Kingdom) Enid Davey (United Kingdom) Pat Ward | 4 | 6 | 4
(Republic of Ireland) Mary Fitzgibbon (Republic of Ireland) Betty Lombard | 6 | 4 | 6
(United Kingdom) Joy Hibbert (United Kingdom) Edith Middleton | 6 | 3 | 3
(United Kingdom) Gay Chandler (United Kingdom) Thelma Lister | 2 | 6 | 6
(United Kingdom) Pam Bocquet (United Kingdom) Wendy Stork | 4 | 4
(United Kingdom) Joan Curry (United Kingdom) Peggy Dawson-Scott | 6 | 6
(United States) Rita Anderson (United Kingdom) Billie Woodgate | 0 | 3
2 | (United States) Doris Hart (United States) Pat Todd | 6 | 6

Third round
(Republic of Ireland) M Fitzgibbon (Republic of Ireland) E Lombard | 3 | 6 | 6
(United Kingdom) G Chandler (United Kingdom) T Lister | 6 | 1 | 3
(United Kingdom) J Curry (United Kingdom) P Dawson-Scott | 3 | 4
2 | (United States) D Hart (United States) P Todd | 6 | 6

Quarterfinals
(Republic of Ireland) M Fitzgibbon (Republic of Ireland) E Lombard | 1 | 1
2 | (United States) D Hart (United States) P Todd | 6 | 6
