= 1948 Wightman Cup =

International women's tennis competition

1956 Wightman Cup
Details
- Edition: 20th

Champion
- Winning nation: United States

The 1948 Wightman Cup was the 20th edition of the annual women's team tennis competition between the United States and Great Britain. It was held at the All England Lawn Tennis and Croquet Club in London, England, United Kingdom.

Great Britain
1
All England Lawn Tennis and Croquet Club, London, England, United Kingdom
1948
Grass

United States
6

			1	2	3
1	(United Kingdom) (United States)	Jean Bostock; Margaret Osborne duPont	4; 6	6; 8
2	(United Kingdom) (United States)	Betty Hilton; Louise Brough	1; 6	1; 6
3	(United Kingdom) (United States)	Betty Hilton; Margaret Osborne duPont	3; 6	4; 6
4	(United Kingdom) (United States)	Jean Bostock; Louise Brough	2; 6	6; 4	5; 7
5	(United Kingdom) (United States)	Joy Gannon; Doris Hart	1; 6	4; 6
6	(United Kingdom) (United States)	Kay Stammers Menzies / Betty Hilton; Louise Brough / Margaret Osborne duPont	2; 6	2; 6
7	(United Kingdom) (United States)	Jean Bostock / Molly Lincoln Blair; Doris Hart / Patricia Todd	6; 3	6; 4
