= 1947 Wightman Cup =

International women's tennis competition

Details
- Edition: 19th

Champion
- Winning nation: United States

The 1947 Wightman Cup was the 19th edition of the annual women's team tennis competition between the United States and Great Britain. It was held at the West Side Tennis Club in Forest Hills, Queens in New York City in the United States.

United States
7
West Side Tennis Club, Forest Hills, New York City, United States
August 1947
Grass

Great Britain
0

			1	2	3
1	(United States) (United Kingdom)	Margaret Osborne; Jean Bostock	6; 4	2; 6	6; 2
2	(United States) (United Kingdom)	Louise Brough; Kay Stammers Menzies	6; 4	6; 3
3	(United States) (United Kingdom)	Doris Hart; Betty Hilton	4; 6	6; 3	7; 5
4	(United States) (United Kingdom)	Louise Brough; Jean Bostock	6; 4	6; 4
5	(United States) (United Kingdom)	Margaret Osborne; Kay Stammers Menzies	7; 5	6; 2
6	(United States) (United Kingdom)	Doris Hart / Patricia Todd; Joy Gannon / Jean Quertier	6; 1	6; 2
7	(United States) (United Kingdom)	Margaret Osborne / Louise Brough; Jean Bostock / Betty Hilton	7; 1	6; 4
