= 1949 Wimbledon Championships – Women's singles =

Women's singles
- 1949 Wimbledon Championships

Final
- Champion: (United States) Louise Brough
- Runner-up: (United States) Margaret duPont
- Score: 10–8, 1–6, 10–8

Details
- Draw: 96 (10 Q )
- Seeds: 8

Events
Singles	men	women		boys	girls
Doubles	men	women	mixed	boys	girls
← 1948 ·	Wimbledon Championships	· 1950 →

Louise Brough successfully defended her title, defeating Margaret duPont in the final, 10–8, 1–6, 10–8 to win the ladies' singles tennis title at the 1949 Wimbledon Championships.

== Seeds ==
1. (United States) Louise Brough (champion)
2. (United States) Margaret duPont (final)
3. (United States) Pat Todd (semifinals)
4. (United States) Gussie Moran (third round)
5. (United States) Shirley Fry (fourth round)
6. (United Kingdom) Jean Quertier (second round)
7. (France) Nelly Adamson (third round)
8. (United Kingdom) Joan Curry (second round)

Click on the seed number of a player to go to their draw section.

== Draw ==
=== Key ===
- Q = Qualifier
- WC = Wild card
- LL = Lucky loser
- Alt = Alternate
- SE = Special exempt
- PR = Protected ranking
- ITF = ITF entry
- JE = Junior exempt
- w/o = Walkover
- r = Retired
- d = Defaulted
- SR = Special ranking

=== Finals ===
Quarterfinals
1	(United States) Louise Brough	6	6
(United Kingdom) Molly Blair	2	3
3	(United States) Pat Todd	3	6	6
(United Kingdom) Jean Walker-Smith	6	4	3
(United Kingdom) Peggy Dawson-Scott	5	5
(United States) Helen Rihbany	7	7
(United Kingdom) Betty Hilton	1	3
2	(United States) Margaret duPont	6	6

Semifinals
1	(United States) Louise Brough	6	6
3	(United States) Pat Todd	3	0
(United States) Helen Rihbany	2	2
2	(United States) Margaret duPont	6	6

Final
1	(United States) Louise Brough	10	1	10
2	(United States) Margaret duPont	8	6	8

=== Top half ===
==== Section 1 ====
First round

Second round
1	(United States) Louise Brough	6	6
(United Kingdom) Edith Middleton	1	1
(United Kingdom) Betty Coutts	3	7
(United Kingdom) Mary Halford	6	9
(United Kingdom) Margot Flowerdrew	6	2	3
Q	(United Kingdom) Enid Sutton	3	6	6
Q	(United Kingdom) Rosemary Walsh	6	3	10
Q	(Egypt) Meg Buxton-Knight	4	6	8

Third round
1	(United States) L Brough	6	6
(United Kingdom) M Halford	1	0
Q	(United Kingdom) E Sutton	4	4
Q	(United Kingdom) R Walsh	6	6

Fourth round
1	(United States) L Brough	6	6
Q	(United Kingdom) R Walsh	1	2

==== Section 2 ====
First round

Second round
7	(France) Nelly Adamson	6	6
(Norway) Laila Schou Nilsen	1	4
(United Kingdom) Barbara Knapp	6	5	1
(United Kingdom) Molly Blair	3	7	6
(Czechoslovakia) Edith Sutz	4	6	5
(United Kingdom) Erica Percival	6	2	7
(United Kingdom) Hilary Stoodley-Morgan	5	3
(United Kingdom) Freda Hammersley	7	6

Third round
7	(France) N Adamson	2	5
(United Kingdom) M Blair	6	7
(United Kingdom) E Percival	5	2
(United Kingdom) W Hammersley	7	6

Fourth round
(United Kingdom) M Blair	6	6
(United Kingdom) W Hammersley	3	1

==== Section 3 ====
First round
3	(United States) Pat Todd	6	6
Q	(United Kingdom) Norma Potts	0	1
(United States) Virginia Boyer	4	7	2
(United Kingdom) Billie Woodgate	6	5	6
(Austria) Hilde Doleschell	6	3	4
(United States) Rita Anderson	2	6	6
LL	(United Kingdom) Zena Lusty	w/o
(Kenya) Sheila Dowdeswell
(France) Jacqueline Marcellin	6	3	6
(United Kingdom) Lesley Fulton	3	6	4
(United Kingdom) Margot Parker	6	2	6
(Republic of Ireland) Mary Fitzgibbon	2	6	4
(United Kingdom) Natalie Gourlay	10	2	6
LL	(United Kingdom) Leonie Brighton	8	6	2
(United Kingdom) Viola White	6	6	6
(Switzerland) Violette Rigollet	4	8	3

Second round
3	(United States) P Todd	6	6
(United Kingdom) R Woodgate	1	2
(United States) R Anderson	3	6	2
(Kenya) S Dowdeswell	6	2	6
(France) J Marcellin	6	6
(United Kingdom) M Parker	4	2
(United Kingdom) N Gourlay	7	3	2
(United Kingdom) V White	5	6	6

Third round
3	(United States) P Todd	6	6
(Kenya) S Dowdeswell	1	0
(France) J Marcellin	4	6	6
(United Kingdom) V White	6	3	4

Fourth round
3	(United States) P Todd	6	6
(France) J Marcellin	2	1

==== Section 4 ====
First round
8	(United Kingdom) Joan Curry	6	6
(United Kingdom) Phyllis King	1	4
(Italy) Annelise Bossi	5	3
(South Africa) Sheila Summers	7	6
(United Kingdom) Jean Walker-Smith	6	6
Q	(United Kingdom) Jacqueline Beswick	3	3
Q	(United Kingdom) Mary Stephens	1	3
(Sweden) Birgit Gullbrandsson	6	6
(Argentina) Mary Terán de Weiss	11	6
(South Africa) Betsy Venter	9	0
(United Kingdom) Margot Gordon	6	6
(United Kingdom) Patsy Rogers	0	2
(Australia) Thelma Long	6	6
(United Kingdom) Penny Durlac	1	1
(Belgium) Miriamme de Borman	9	6
(United States) Gloria Butler	7	2

Second round
8	(United Kingdom) J Curry	3	5
(South Africa) S Summers	6	7
(United Kingdom) J Walker-Smith	6	6
(Sweden) B Gullbrandsson	1	3
(Argentina) M Terán de Weiss	5	8	6
(United Kingdom) M Gordon	7	6	2
(Australia) T Long	6	6
(Belgium) M de Borman	0	2

Third round
(South Africa) S Summers	2	2
(United Kingdom) J Walker-Smith	6	6
(Argentina) M Terán de Weiss	6	5	3
(Australia) T Long	3	7	6

Fourth round
(United Kingdom) J Walker-Smith	6	6
(Australia) T Long	1	3

=== Bottom half ===
==== Section 5 ====
First round
(Czechoslovakia) Helena Straubeová	6	6
Q	(United Kingdom) Lorna Byrne	1	3
(United Kingdom) Joey David	6	3	4
(United Kingdom) Janet Morgan	3	6	6
(South Africa) Toots Watermeyer	6	6
Q	(United Kingdom) Joan Quelch	3	0
(Denmark) Eva Fog	6	3
(United Kingdom) Elsie Phillips	8	6
(United Kingdom) Pat Cowney	4	6	2
Q	(United Kingdom) Beryl Parker	6	3	6
(France) Colette Boegner	6	6
(United Kingdom) Pat Ward	0	0
(United Kingdom) Peggy Dawson-Scott	6	6
(United Kingdom) Audrey Bates	3	1
(United Kingdom) Margaret Knott	2	2
6	(United Kingdom) Jean Quertier	6	6

Second round
(Czechoslovakia) H Straubeová	7	2	7
(United Kingdom) J Morgan	5	6	5
(South Africa) T Watermeyer	6	6
(United Kingdom) E Phillips	1	2
Q	(United Kingdom) B Parker	1	0
(France) C Boegner	6	6
(United Kingdom) P Dawson-Scott	6	6
6	(United Kingdom) J Quertier	4	4

Third round
(Czechoslovakia) H Straubeová	1	2
(South Africa) T Watermeyer	6	6
(France) C Boegner	9	6	5
(United Kingdom) P Dawson-Scott	11	0	7

Fourth round
(South Africa) T Watermeyer	4	5
(United Kingdom) P Dawson-Scott	6	7

==== Section 6 ====
First round
(United States) Helen Rihbany	6	6
(United Kingdom) Molly Stone	1	2
(United Kingdom) Joy Hibbert	1	3
(United Kingdom) Kay Tuckey	6	6
(Australia) Joan Bathurst	0	4
(United Kingdom) Joy Gannon	6	6
(United Kingdom) Noelle Knight	3	2
(United Kingdom) Georgie Woodgate	6	6
(United Kingdom) Gem Hoahing	2	6	6
(United Kingdom) Wendy Stork	6	4	2
(France) Jacqueline Boutin	6	6
(United Kingdom) Effie Peters	2	4
(United Kingdom) Betty Wilford	6	5	6
LL	(United Kingdom) Audrey Mothersole	2	7	1
(United Kingdom) Bea Walter	6	2	3
4	(United States) Gussie Moran	3	6	6

Second round
(United States) H Rihbany	6	3	8
(United Kingdom) K Tuckey	3	6	6
(United Kingdom) J Gannon	6	6
(United Kingdom) G Woodgate	3	0
(United Kingdom) C Hoahing	6	6
(France) J Boutin	4	0
(United Kingdom) E Wilford	1	4
4	(United States) G Moran	6	6

Third round
(United States) H Rihbany	7	7
(United Kingdom) J Gannon	5	5
(United Kingdom) C Hoahing	6	5	6
4	(United States) G Moran	2	7	3

Fourth round
(United States) H Rihbany	6	6
(United Kingdom) C Hoahing	4	4

==== Section 7 ====
First round

Second round
(France) Anne-Marie Seghers	5	2
(United Kingdom) Betty Hilton	7	6
(United Kingdom) Katherine Keith-Steele	3	2
(United Kingdom) Enid Andrews	6	6
(United States) Arvilla McGuire	6	6
Q	(United Kingdom) Nathalie Feiron	2	2
(Sweden) Mary Lagerborg	0	2
5	(United States) Shirley Fry	6	6

Third round
(United Kingdom) E Hilton	6	3	6
(United Kingdom) E Andrews	1	6	3
(United States) A McGuire	3	4
5	(United States) S Fry	6	6

Fourth round
(United Kingdom) E Hilton	4	6	6
5	(United States) S Fry	6	1	4

==== Section 8 ====
First round

Second round
(Netherlands) Nel Hermsen	6	6
(Republic of Ireland) Betty Lombard	3	2
(Australia) Joyce Fitch	4	6	6
(United Kingdom) Patsy O'Connell	6	0	1
(United Kingdom) Betty Cooke	1	7
(United Kingdom) Gay Chandler	6	9
(United Kingdom) Gladys Lines	2	1
2	(United States) Margaret duPont	6	6

Third round
(Netherlands) N Hermsen	1	1
(Australia) J Fitch	6	6
(United Kingdom) G Chandler	1	1
2	(United States) M duPont	6	6

Fourth round
(Australia) J Fitch	0	1
2	(United States) M duPont	6	6

Preceded by 1949 French Championships – Women's singles	Grand Slam women's singles	Succeeded by 1949 U.S. National Championships – Women's singles
