= 1949 Wightman Cup =

International women's tennis competition

Details
- Edition: 21st

Champion
- Winning nation: United States

The 1949 Wightman Cup was the 21st edition of the annual women's team tennis competition between the United States and Great Britain. It was held at the Merion Cricket Club in Haverford, Pennsylvania, United States.

United States
7
Merion Cricket Club, Haverford, Pennsylvania, United States
August 1949
Grass

Great Britain
0

			1	2	3
1	(United States) (United Kingdom)	Doris Hart; Jean Walker-Smith	6; 3	6; 1
2	(United States) (United Kingdom)	Margaret Osborne duPont; Betty Hilton	6; 1	6; 3
3	(United States) (United Kingdom)	Doris Hart; Betty Hilton	6; 1	6; 3
4	(United States) (United Kingdom)	Margaret Osborne duPont; Jean Walker-Smith	6; 4	6; 2
5	(United States) (United Kingdom)	Beverly Baker; Jean Quertier	6; 4	7; 5
6	(United States) (United Kingdom)	Doris Hart / Shirley Fry; Jean Quertier / Molly Lincoln Blair	6; 1	6; 2
7	(United States) (United Kingdom)	Gussie Moran / Patricia Todd; Betty Hilton / Kay Tuckey	6; 4	8; 6
