= Derek Hardwick =

British tennis player (1921–1987)

Derek Hardwick CBE (30 January 1921 – 28 May 1987) was a tennis player, tennis administrator, and the president of the International Tennis Federation from 1975 to 1977.

Hardwick was a former British doubles champion who played in the 1946 Wimbledon mixed doubles with Doris Hart and later became Chairman of the Lawn Tennis Association. Along with Herman David, then chairman of the All England Club, Derek Hardwick was a leading advocate for open tennis, involving both amateurs and professionals. The first open tournament in the Open Era was the British Hard Court Championships was played at Mr. Hardwick's home club, the West Hampshire Club, Bournemouth, in 1968. Hardwick also served as chairman of the Men's International Professional Tennis Council between 1974 and 1977 which was the governing body of men's tennis prior to the advent of the ATP Tour. Hardwick was inducted into the International Tennis Hall of Fame in 2010.

== Personal life ==
His sister Mary Hardwick was also an active tennis player in the 1930s and 1940s.

== Death ==
He died at his home on May 28, 1987, after a short illness. He was 66 years old.
