= Pearl Panton =

British tennis player (1921–2014)

- Country (sports): United Kingdom
- Born: 6 September 1921 Edmonton, London, England
- Died: 2014 (aged 92) Merton, London, England

Grand Slam singles results
- Wimbledon: 3R (1946)

Grand Slam doubles results
- Wimbledon: 3R (1946, 1955, 1957)

Grand Slam mixed doubles results
- Wimbledon: 4R (1955)

Pearl Iris Panton (née Gannon; 6 September 1921 – 2014) was a British tennis player.

Panton, a Surrey county representative, was the elder sister of tennis player Joy Mottram.

On her Wimbledon debut in 1946, Panton made the third round of the singles, losing to Doris Hart. She continued to feature at Wimbledon until 1960 without again reaching that stage.

In 1956 she beat Christine Truman in the final of the Surrey Hard Court Championships in Roehampton.

By the end of the war she had married Robert Panton, a Lieutenant who served in the Pacific. The couple had a baby born in 1949, which they named Joy.

Panton died in Merton, London in 2014, at the age of 92.
