= Betty Batt =

British tennis player

- Country (sports): Great Britain
- Born: 7 February 1916
- Died: 26 March 2003 (aged 87)
- Plays: Right-handed

Singles

Grand Slam singles results
- Wimbledon: 3R (1948)

Doubles

Grand Slam doubles results
- Wimbledon: QF (1946)

Grand Slam mixed doubles results
- Wimbledon: 4R (1939, 1946)

Betty Batt (7 February 1916 – 26 March 2003) was a British tennis player of the 1930s and 1940s.

A London native, Batt won the British junior hard court title in 1934 and featured in her first Wimbledon main draw the following year. In 1946 she appeared for Great Britain in the Wightman Cup, partnering Molly Lincoln in doubles, then two weeks later made the Wimbledon doubles quarter-finals with Lincoln.

Batt's first marriage, in 1940, was to Noel Passingham, with whom she had one child. She divorced Passingham in 1949 and soon after was married to Frank Martin-Davies, a colonial administrator in Nigeria.
