= Hilda Walterová =

Czech skier (1915–2013)

Personal information
- Nationality: Czech
- Born: 21 February 1915; Liberec, Austria-Hungary
- Died: 19 April 2013 (aged 98); Guelph, Ontario, Canada

Sport
- Sport: Alpine skiing

Hilda Walterová, also Hilde Doleschell, (21 February 1915 – 19 April 2013) was a Czech alpine skier and tennis player. She competed in the women's combined event at the 1936 Winter Olympics.

It is thought she was the last living participant from the 1936 Winter Olympics.
