= Jean Bostock =

British table tennis and tennis player

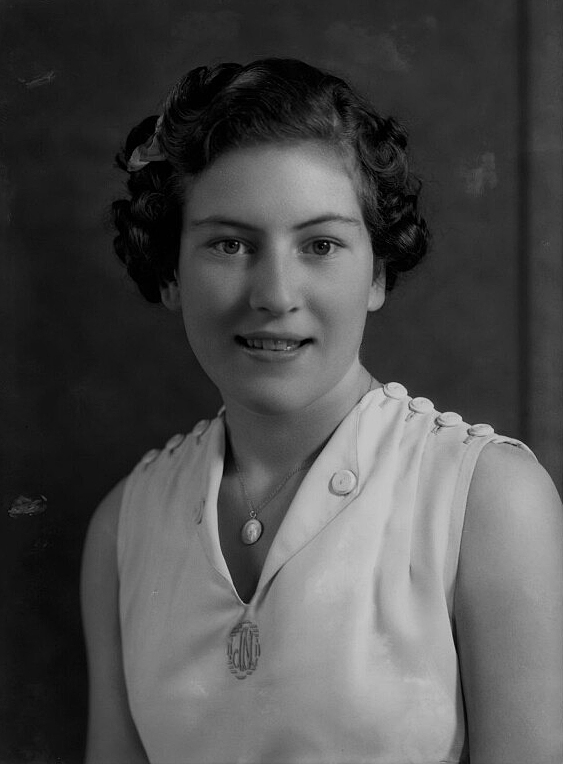
- Nicoll in 1939
- Full name: Jean Nicoll Bostock
- Country (sports): United Kingdom
- Born: 14 December 1922; Harrow, London, England
- Died: 2 April 1965 (aged 42); Ipswich, England
- Plays: Right-handed

Singles
- Highest ranking: No. 6 (1948)

Grand Slam singles results
- Wimbledon: QF (1946, 1947, 1948)

Doubles

Grand Slam doubles results
- Wimbledon: SF (1939, 1946, 1947, 1948)

Jean Addie Bissett Bostock (née Nicoll, 14 December 1922 – 2 April 1965), was a female international table tennis and tennis player from England.

== Table tennis career ==
At the age of 16, she won the singles gold medal at the 1939 English Open and the 1940 doubles title with Dora Beregi.

== Tennis career ==
She was considered the most promising junior player in Great Britain before World War II, and she won all three events at the junior British Championships in 1938.

She played at the Wimbledon Championships listed as Mrs Jean Bostock and made the quarterfinals of the women's singles from 1946 to 1948. In the doubles event, she reached the semifinals in 1939 and from 1946 to 1948, partnering four different compatriots.

Bostock won all three events at the 1946 British Hard Court Championships in Bournemouth, defeating Kay Menzies in straight sets in the singles final. In 1947 she won the singles title at the Irish Championships, and represented Great Britain in the 1946, 1947, and 1948 Wightman Cup.

She was ranked in the world top 10 in 1947 and 1948, and according to John Olliff of The Daily Telegraph, reached a career high of world No. 6 in 1948.

== Personal life ==
She married Edward 'Teddy' William Augustus Bostock on 30 January 1943 and played as Jean Bostock afterward. She died at the age of 42 in 1965 after an overdose of barbiturates.

== See also ==
- List of table tennis players
- List of World Table Tennis Championships medalists
