= Thelma Lister =

British tennis player

- Country (sports): United Kingdom

Singles

Grand Slam singles results
- Wimbledon: 2R (1939, 47, 51, 53, 58)

Doubles

Grand Slam doubles results
- Wimbledon: 3R (1946, 1948)

Grand Slam mixed doubles results
- Wimbledon: 4R (1959)

Thelma Lister was a British former tennis player.

Lister was the niece of Sir John Jarvis, 1st Baronet. She won the singles title at the Irish Championships in 1937 and was runner-up the year after. Her career titles also included the North of England Championships. Amongst her Wimbledon appearances, which spanned four decades, she made the mixed doubles fourth round with Abe Segal in 1959. She was married to tennis player and South Africa Davis Cup captain Claude Lister.
