= Birgit Gullbrandsson-Sandén =

Swedish tennis player

Birgit "Bibbi" Gullbrandsson (married name Sandén, 22 August 1916 – 6 January 2006), was a Swedish tennis player. She won the women's Swedish Open in 1954.

== Tennis career ==
Beginning in 1938 when she was 22, Bibbi Gullbrandsson won 49 Swedish national championships, 16 in singles. She often partnered in doubles with Mary Lagerborg.

Like many others, she lost several years of international competitive opportunities to World War II. After the war, she won the women's Swedish Open in 1954, defeating Milly Vagn-Nielsen in straight sets, and in 1955, when she was 39, she won the German Tennis Championship.

== Personal life ==
Gullbrandsson was born in Kalmar. She lived in Stockholm for most of her life, and worked in cartography. For most of her playing career she belonged to the Stockholm General Lawn Tennis Club; at the end of her career she transferred to the Swedish Royal Lawn Tennis Club.

== Sources ==
- Mats Hasselqvist, Salkbollen, 2006, no. 1. (in Swedish)
- Göran Tholerus, Ett sekel av svensk tennis, centennial celebration volume, Stockholm: Kungliga lawn tennis klubben, 1996, ISBN 9789163043086. (in Swedish)
