= Gem Hoahing =

- Full name: Gem Cynthia Hoahing
- Country (sports): United Kingdom
- Born: 20 October 1920 British Hong Kong
- Died: 15 October 2015 (aged 94)
- Height: 4 ft 9.5 in (1.46 m)

Grand Slam singles results
- Wimbledon: 4R (1949, 1957)

Grand Slam doubles results
- Wimbledon: QF (1948)

Grand Slam mixed doubles results
- Wimbledon: 4R (1956)

Gem Cynthia Hoahing (20 October 1920 – 15 October 2015) was an English female tennis player of Chinese heritage who was active from the second half of the 1930s until the early 1960s.

== Early life ==
Hoahing was born in British Hong Kong on 20 October 1920. Her father, Benjamin Hunter Hoahing, was a businessman while her mother, Singha (Susan) Ho A Shoo, became a Fellow of the Royal College of Surgeons after the family had moved to England in the late 1920s. Her mother taught her to play tennis on the court at their house in Twickenham. When she was 12 years old she played at the West Twickenham LTC and made a trip to the French Riviera for the first time where she played in a number of handicap tournaments. At age 14 she won the under 16 singles title at the Queen's Club Championships.

== Career ==
Hoahing won the junior singles Championship of Great Britain and of France in 1936. She was the singles runner-up at the 1938 South of France Championships, held at the Nice Club, losing the final in straight sets to Gracyn Wheeler. Hoahing, then 17 years old, had defeated Simonne Mathieu in the quarterfinal, who was at the time the No. 5 ranked player in the world and had won the previous three editions of the tournament.

Between 1937 and 1961 she competed in 19 Wimbledon Championships. In 1936 she was refused entry to the tournament because of her young age. Starting around that time she was coached (Note: According to Australian tennis player and coach Harry Hopman in a 1949 column her coaching negatively impacted her natural sense of rhythm and, combined with the pressure of being put in the limelight, halted her development and performance.) for some years by Dan Maskell. Her best singles result at Wimbledon was reaching the fourth round in 1949 and 1957. In 1949 she defeated fourth-seeded Gussie Moran in the third round and in 1957 first-seeded and eventual champion Althea Gibson proved too strong. In 1952 she was a runner up to Betsy Abbas at the All England Plate, a competition held at the Wimbledon Championships for players who were defeated in the first or second rounds of the singles competition.

In July 1946 she won the first edition of the Welsh Championships after World War II, beating Joy Hibbert in the final. Hoahing won the singles title at the British Covered Court Championships, held at the Queen's Club, in 1948 after a three-sets win in the final against compatriot Joan Curry. She added the singles title at the North of England Championships in Scarborough to her palmares in August 1949, her third consecutive title at the event. That year she also won the singles title at the Scottish Championships. In 1950 she defeated Mary Terán de Weiss in the final to become the South of England Championships singles champion. The previous year she had also reached the final but lost to compatriot Jean Walker-Smith.

At 4 ft 9.5in (1.46 m) Hoahing was the shortest player to compete at Wimbledon.

After her active playing career she started a flower shop near Kensington Gardens and was involved in charity work.

In 2025 the Museum of Richmond included her in their exhibition "Trailblazing Women – Richmond’s Sporting Superstars".
