= Betty Lombard =

Irish tennis player

- Full name: Elizabeth Ann Lombard
- Country (sports): Republic of Ireland
- Born: c. 1920
- Died: March 1984 (aged 63–64); Dublin
- Turned pro: 1940 (amateur)
- Retired: 1960

Singles
- Career titles: 15

Grand Slam singles results
- Wimbledon: QF 1948

Betty Lombard (c. 1920 – March 1984) was an Irish tennis player who was a quarter finalist in the women's doubles at the 1948 Wimbledon Championships, and reached the Women's Plate final at Wimbledon, in 1953.

== Career ==
Betty Lombard was born Elizabeth Ann Lombard around 1920. She lived on Anglesea Road, Dublin. She took up tennis, first playing at the Anglesea Tennis Club, and later with the Lansdowne Lawn Tennis Club. She won the singles title at the East of Ireland Championships 12 times. Lombard won the singles at the Irish Championships in 1941, 1943, and 1951. With Mary Fitzgibbon (née Nichols), Lombard played in the doubles quarter-final on the Centre Court at Wimbledon in 1948. She won the Irish Championships women's doubles title in 1951 with Fitzgibbon. In 1953, Lombard played in the Women's Plate final at Wimbledon.

Lombard ran a typing and secretarial school on Harcourt Street, Dublin. After her playing career, Lombard helped with the administration of the Leinster Championships for the juniors and the East of Ireland Championships, both at the Landsowne Lawn Tennis Club. Lombard died in Dublin in March 1984.

In 2017, the Lansdowne Lawn Tennis Club named their new function room the "Betty Lombard Room".
