= Truid Blaisse-Terwindt =

Dutch field hockey and tennis player

- Full name: Geertruida Blaisse-Terwindt
- Country (sports): Netherlands
- Born: 4 April 1917 Amsterdam, Netherlands
- Died: 27 December 2002 (aged 85) Amerongen, Netherlands

Singles

Grand Slam singles results
- French Open: 3R (1937)
- Wimbledon: 3R (1937, 1948)

Doubles

Grand Slam doubles results
- Wimbledon: 3R (1936, 1946)

Grand Slam mixed doubles results
- Wimbledon: 4R (1946)

Truid Blaisse-Terwindt (4 April 1917 – 27 December 2002) was a Dutch female hockey- and tennis player who was active in the 1930s and 1940s. From 1935 to 1948, she participated in five Wimbledon Championships. Her best result in the singles event was reaching the third round in 1937, losing to Dorothy Round, and 1948, losing to first seeded Margaret du Pont. In the doubles, she reached the third round in 1936 and 1946 partnering compatriot Madzy Rollin Couquerque. With Ivo Rinkel, she reached the fourth round of the mixed doubles in 1946.

In 1936 Terwindt became Dutch champion in the singles, doubles (partnering Madzy Rollin Couquerque) and mixed doubles (partnering Joop Knottenbelt) events. In 1937, she successfully defended her singles and doubles titles. In total, she won 13 Dutch championship titles during her career.

In addition to tennis, she was active in field hockey. In 1931, at the age of 14, she joined the Amsterdamsche Hockey & Bandy Club (AH & BC) and directly became a member of the first team. With AH & BC, she became national champion in 1937 and 1938 and made nine appearances for the Dutch national team. Her marriage in 1938 to Huib Blaisse brought an end to her hockey career.
