= Betty Hilton =

British tennis player

- Full name: Elizabeth Evelyn Clements
- Country (sports): United Kingdom
- Born: 12 February 1920
- Died: 3 July 2017 (aged 97)
- Retired: 1950

Singles

Grand Slam singles results
- French Open: QF (1946)
- Wimbledon: QF (1949, 1950)

Doubles

Grand Slam doubles results
- French Open: F (1949)
- Wimbledon: SF (1947, 1949)

Grand Slam mixed doubles results
- Wimbledon: QF (1946, 1950)

Betty Hilton (born Elizabeth Evelyn Clements, 12 February 1920 – 3 July 2017) was a British tennis player of the post-World War II era. She reached the women's doubles final at the 1949 French Open alongside Joy Gannon. Clements also reached the quarterfinals in singles at the 1946 French Open and the quarterfinals at the 1949 and 1950 Wimbledon Championships.

== Career ==
Clements reached her first singles quarterfinal and doubles semifinal at the 1946 French Championships. In 1947 she reached her first Wimbledon doubles semifinal with partner Jean Bostock falling to Doris Hart and Pat Todd who went on to win the championships. The next year Clements partnered Kay Menzies and reached the third round. Clements partnered Joy Gannon in 1949 at Wimbledon and reached the semifinals for the second time in her career, they lost to Louise Brough and Margarent du Pont.

At the 1948 British Hard Court Championships Clements won the women's singles title defeating Pamela Bocquet 6–1, 6–4 in the final.

At the 1949 Scandinavian Indoor Championships Clements won the women's doubles title with Jean Quertier.

In 1949 and 1950 Clements reached consecutive singles quarterfinals at Wimbledon, in 1949 falling to Margaret du Pont and in 1950 falling to Pat Todd.

== Personal life ==
Clements married Raymond Hilton on 2 September 1942, he died during WWII. Clements played under the name Hilton until her second marriage to Andrew James Christopher Harrison on 19 June 1950 and Clements briefly played under the name Harrison until she retired later that year.

== Career statistics ==
=== Grand Slam performance timelines ===
Key
W	F	SF	QF	#R	RR	Q#	DNQ	A	NH

(W) winner; (F) finalist; (SF) semifinalist; (QF) quarterfinalist; (#R) rounds 4, 3, 2, 1; (RR) round-robin stage; (Q#) qualification round; (DNQ) did not qualify; (A) absent; (NH) not held; (SR) strike rate (events won / competed); (W–L) win–loss record.

==== Singles ====
Tournament	1939	1940	1941	1942	1943	1944	1945	1946^{1}	1947^{1}	1948	1949	1950	SR	W-L	Win%
Australian Championships	A	A	NH	NH	NH	NH	NH	A	A	A	A	A	0 / 0	0–0	0%
French Championships	A	NH	R	R	R	R	A	QF	A	A	1R	A	0 / 2	4–2	66%
Wimbledon	2R	NH	NH	NH	NH	NH	NH	4R	4R	3R	QF	QF	0 / 6	17–6	74%
U.S. Championships	A	A	A	A	A	A	A	A	A	A	A	A	0 / 0	0–0	0%
Win–loss	1–1	0–0	0–0	0–0	0–0	0–0	0–0	7–2	3–1	2–0	4–2	4–0	0 / 8	21–8	72%

==== Doubles ====
Tournament	1939	1940	1941	1942	1943	1944	1945	1946^{1}	1947^{1}	1948	1949	1950	SR	W-L	Win%
Australian Championships	A	A	NH	NH	NH	NH	NH	A	A	A	A	A	0 / 0	0–0	0%
French Championships	A	NH	R	R	R	R	A	SF	A	A	F	A	0 / 2	11–2	85%
Wimbledon	2R	NH	NH	NH	NH	NH	NH	1R	SF	3R	SF	QF	0 / 6	17–6	74%
U.S. Championships	A	A	A	A	A	A	A	A	A	A	A	A	0 / 0	0–0	0%
Win–loss	1–1	0–0	0–0	0–0	0–0	0–0	0–0	5–2	5–1	2–0	11–2	4–0	0 / 8	28–8	78%

R = tournament restricted to French nationals and held under German occupation.

^{1}In 1946 and 1947, the French Championships were held after Wimbledon.

=== Grand Slam finals ===
==== Doubles (1 runner-up) ====
Result	Year	Championship	Surface	Partner	Opponents	Score
Loss	1949	French Championships	Clay	(United Kingdom) Joy Gannon	(United States) Louise Brough (United States) Margret Osbourne	7–5, 6–1
