= Margaret Osborne duPont =

American tennis player

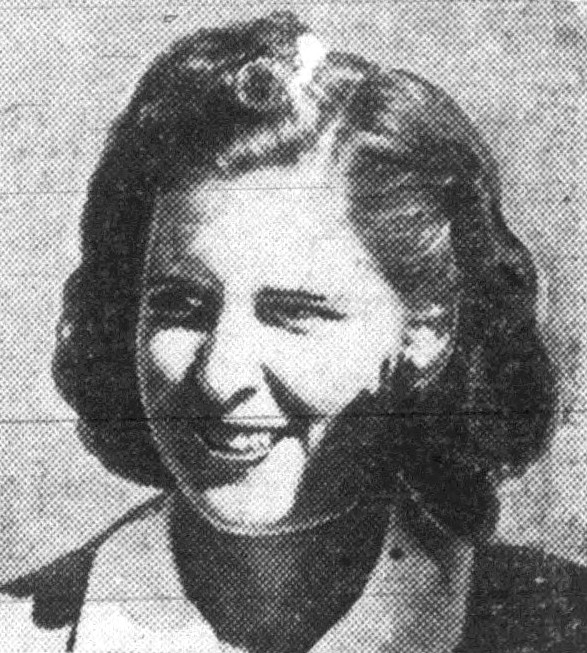
- Osborne duPont, circa 1941
- Full name: Margaret Evelyn Osborne duPont
- Country (sports): United States
- Born: March 4, 1918 Joseph, Oregon, U.S.
- Died: October 24, 2012 (aged 94) El Paso, Texas, U.S.
- Height: 5 ft 5 in (1.65 m)
- Plays: Right-handed
- Int. Tennis HoF: 1967 (member page)

Singles
- Career record: 0–0
- Highest ranking: No. 1 (1947)

Grand Slam singles results
- French Open: W (1946, 1949)
- Wimbledon: W (1947)
- US Open: W (1948, 1949, 1950)

Doubles
- Career record: 0–0

Grand Slam doubles results
- French Open: W (1946, 1947, 1949)
- Wimbledon: W (1946, 1948, 1949, 1950, 1954)
- US Open: W (1941, 1942, 1943, 1944, 1945, 1946, 1947, 1948, 1949, 1950, 1955, 1956, 1957)

Grand Slam mixed doubles results
- Wimbledon: W (1962)
- US Open: W (1943, 1944, 1945, 1946, 1950, 1956, 1958, 1959, 1960)

Margaret Osborne duPont (born Margaret Evelyn Osborne; March 4, 1918 – October 24, 2012) was a world No. 1 American female tennis player.

DuPont won a total of 37 singles, women's doubles, and mixed doubles major titles, which places her fourth on the all-time list, despite never entering the Australian Championships. She won 25 of those major titles at the U.S. Championships, which is an all-time record.

== Career ==
DuPont won six Grand Slam tournament singles titles. She saved match points in the final of the 1946 French International Championships (versus Pauline Betz) and in the final of the 1948 U.S. National Championships (versus Louise Brough). The 48 games played during the 1948 final remain the most played in a women's singles final at that tournament.

DuPont teamed with Brough to win 20 Grand Slam women's doubles titles, tied with Martina Navratilova and Pam Shriver for the most Grand Slam titles ever won by a women's doubles team. DuPont and Brough won nine consecutive titles at the U.S. National Championships from 1942 through 1950. They won that tournament in 12 of the 14 years they entered as a team. Their 12 titles is an all-time record for a women's doubles team at the U.S. National Championships, well-surpassing the four career titles won by the teams of Navratilova and Shriver, Doris Hart and Shirley Fry, and Sarah Palfrey Cooke and Alice Marble. DuPont won 13 women's doubles titles, 10 of which were in succession from 1941 through 1950, at the U.S. National Championships. Both of those are all-time records.

DuPont's nine mixed doubles titles at the U.S. National Championships is more than any other player. Four of those titles were in partnership with William Talbert, which is a record for a mixed doubles team at the U.S. National Championships. One each with Ken McGregor and Ken Rosewall, and three were with Neale Fraser.

According to John Olliff and Lance Tingay of The Daily Telegraph and the Daily Mail, duPont was ranked in the world top 10 from 1946 through 1950, and in 1953-1954, and in 1956-1957. She was ranked world No. 1 from 1947 through 1950. No rankings were issued from 1940 through 1945.

DuPont was included in the year-end top 10 rankings issued by the United States Lawn Tennis Association in 1938, from 1941 through 1950, and in 1953, 1956 and 1958. She was the top ranked U.S. player from 1948 through 1950.

From 1938 through 1958, DuPont went undefeated in 10 Wightman Cup competitions, winning 10 singles and nine doubles matches. She also was the captain of the U.S. team nine times, and won eight.

== Personal life ==
Margaret married William duPont, Jr. on November 26, 1947 and later interrupted her career to give birth to a son, William duPont III on July 22, 1952. She is one of the few women to win a major title after childbirth. DuPont never played the Australian Championships because her husband would not let her.

They didn't start to invite people down there and pay their expenses until I got married, and that was wintertime and Will's vacation time, and I just never got to go. He threatened to divorce me if I went to Australia, so I never went. He had that respiratory trouble, and he wanted me to come to California with him. He thought I should be with him. That was that.

She later divorced duPont in 1964 and formed a life partnership with fellow player Margaret Varner Bloss.

DuPont died on October 24, 2012, while in hospice care in El Paso, Texas, at age 94.

== Awards ==
She was inducted into the International Tennis Hall of Fame in 1967. The Delaware Sports Hall of Fame inducted DuPont in 1999. In 2010, she was inducted into the US Open Court of Champions.

== Grand Slam finals ==
=== Singles (6 titles, 4 runners-up) ===
Result	Year	Championship	Surface	Opponent	Score
Loss	1944	U.S. Championships	Grass	(United States) Pauline Betz	6–3, 8–6
Win	1946	French Championships	Clay	(United States) Pauline Betz	1–6, 8–6, 7–5
Win	1947	Wimbledon	Grass	(United States) Doris Hart	6–2, 6–4
Loss	1947	U.S. Championships	Grass	(United States) Louise Brough	6–8, 6–4, 1–6
Win	1948	U.S. Championships	Grass	(United States) Louise Brough	4–6, 6–4, 15–13
Win	1949	French Championships (2)	Clay	(France) Nelly Adamson-Landry	7–5, 6–2
Loss	1949	Wimbledon	Grass	(United States) Louise Brough	8–10, 6–1, 8–10
Win	1949	U.S. Championships (2)	Grass	(United States) Doris Hart	6–3, 6–1
Loss	1950	Wimbledon	Grass	(United States) Louise Brough	1–6, 6–3, 1–6
Win	1950	U.S. Championships (3)	Grass	(United States) Doris Hart	6–4, 6–3

=== Doubles (21 titles, 6 runners-up) ===
Result	Year	Championship	Surface	Partner	Opponents	Score
Win	1941	U.S. Championships	Grass	(United States) Sarah Palfrey	(United States) Dorothy Bundy (United States) Pauline Betz	3–6, 6–1, 6–4
Win	1942	U.S. Championships (2)	Grass	(United States) Louise Brough	(United States) Pauline Betz (United States) Doris Hart	2–6, 7–5, 6–0
Win	1943	U.S. Championships (3)	Grass	(United States) Louise Brough	(United States) Pauline Betz (United States) Doris Hart	6–4, 6–3
Win	1944	U.S. Championships (4)	Grass	(United States) Louise Brough	(United States) Pauline Betz (United States) Doris Hart	4–6, 6–4, 6–3
Win	1945	U.S. Championships (5)	Grass	(United States) Louise Brough	(United States) Pauline Betz (United States) Doris Hart	6–3, 6–3
Win	1946	Wimbledon	Grass	(United States) Louise Brough	(United States) Pauline Betz (United States) Doris Hart	6–3, 2–6, 6–3
Win	1946	French Championships	Clay	(United States) Louise Brough	(United States) Pauline Betz (United States) Doris Hart	6–4, 0–6, 6–1
Win	1946	U.S. Championships (6)	Grass	(United States) Louise Brough	(United States) Pat Canning Todd (United States) Mary Arnold Prentiss	6–1, 6–3
Loss	1947	Wimbledon	Grass	(United States) Louise Brough	(United States) Doris Hart (United States) Pat Canning Todd	3–6, 6–4, 7–5
Win	1947	French Championships (2)	Clay	(United States) Louise Brough	(United States) Pauline Betz (United States) Pat Canning Todd	7–5, 6–2
Win	1947	U.S. Championships (7)	Grass	(United States) Louise Brough	(United States) Pat Canning Todd (United States) Doris Hart	5–7, 6–3, 7–5
Win	1948	Wimbledon (2)	Grass	(United States) Louise Brough	(United States) Doris Hart (United States) Pat Canning Todd	6–3, 3–6, 6–3
Win	1948	U.S. Championships (8)	Grass	(United States) Louise Brough	(United States) Pat Canning Todd (United States) Doris Hart	6–4, 8–10, 6–1
Win	1949	French Championships (3)	Clay	(United States) Louise Brough	(United Kingdom) Joy Gannon (United Kingdom) Betty Hilton	7–5, 6–1
Win	1949	Wimbledon (3)	Grass	(United States) Louise Brough	(United States) Gussy Moran (United States) Pat Canning Todd	8–6, 7–5
Win	1949	U.S. Championships (9)	Grass	(United States) Louise Brough	(United States) Doris Hart (United States) Shirley Fry	6–4, 10–8
Loss	1950	French Championships	Clay	(United States) Louise Brough	(United States) Doris Hart (United States) Shirley Fry	1–6, 7–5, 6–2
Win	1950	Wimbledon (4)	Grass	(United States) Louise Brough	(United States) Shirley Fry (United States) Doris Hart	6–4, 5–7, 6–1
Win	1950	U.S. Championships (10)	Grass	(United States) Louise Brough	(United States) Doris Hart (United States) Shirley Fry	6–2, 6–3
Loss	1951	Wimbledon	Grass	(United States) Louise Brough	(United States) Shirley Fry (United States) Doris Hart	6–3, 13–11
Loss	1953	U.S. Championships	Grass	(United States) Louise Brough	(United States) Doris Hart (United States) Shirley Fry	6–2, 7–9, 9–7
Win	1954	Wimbledon (5)	Grass	(United States) Louise Brough	(United States) Shirley Fry (United States) Doris Hart	4–6, 9–7, 6–3
Loss	1954	U.S. Championships	Grass	(United States) Louise Brough	(United States) Doris Hart (United States) Shirley Fry	6–4, 6–4
Win	1955	U.S. Championships (11)	Grass	(United States) Louise Brough	(United States) Doris Hart (United States) Shirley Fry	6–3, 1–6, 6–3
Win	1956	U.S. Championships (12)	Grass	(United States) Louise Brough	(United States) Betty Rosenquest Pratt (United States) Shirley Fry	6–3, 6–0
Win	1957	U.S. Championships (13)	Grass	(United States) Louise Brough	(United States) Althea Gibson (United States) Darlene Hard	6–2, 7–5
Loss	1958	Wimbledon (5)	Grass	(United States) Margaret Varner	(Brazil) Maria Bueno (United States) Althea Gibson	3–6, 5–7

=== Mixed doubles: (10 titles, 4 runners-up) ===
Result	Year	Championship	Surface	Partner	Opponents	Score
Win	1943	U.S. Championships	Grass	(United States) Bill Talbert	(United States) Pauline Betz (United States) Pancho Segura	10–6, 6–4
Win	1944	U.S. Championships	Grass	(United States) Bill Talbert	(United States) Dorothy Bundy (United States) Don McNeill	6–2, 6–3
Win	1945	U.S. Championships	Grass	(United States) Bill Talbert	(United States) Doris Hart (United States) Bob Falkenburg	6–4, 6–4
Win	1946	U.S. Championships	Grass	(United States) Bill Talbert	(United States) Louise Brough (United States) Robert Kimbrell	6–3, 6–4
Loss	1948	U.S. Championships	Grass	(United States) Bill Talbert	(United States) Louise Brough (United States) Tom Brown	4–6, 4–6
Loss	1949	U.S. Championships	Grass	(United States) Bill Talbert	(United States) Louise Brough (South Africa) Eric Sturgess	6–4, 3–6, 5–7
Win	1950	U.S. Championships	Grass	(Australia) Ken McGregor	(United States) Doris Hart (Australia) Frank Sedgman	6–4, 3–6, 6–3
Loss	1954	Wimbledon	Grass	(Australia) Ken Rosewall	(United States) Doris Hart (United States) Vic Seixas	7–5, 4–6, 3–6
Loss	1954	U.S. Championships	Grass	(Australia) Ken Rosewall	(United States) Doris Hart (United States) Vic Seixas	6–4, 1–6, 1–6
Win	1956	U.S. Championships	Grass	(Australia) Ken Rosewall	(United States) Darlene Hard (Australia) Lew Hoad	9–7, 6–1
Win	1958	U.S. Championships	Grass	(Australia) Neale Fraser	(Brazil) Maria Bueno (United States) Alex Olmedo	6–3, 3–6, 9–7
Win	1959	U.S. Championships	Grass	(Australia) Neale Fraser	(United States) Janet Hopps (Australia) Bob Mark	7–5, 13–15, 6–2
Win	1960	U.S. Championships	Grass	(Australia) Neale Fraser	(Brazil) Maria Bueno (Mexico) Antonio Palafox	6–3, 6–2
Win	1962	Wimbledon	Grass	(Australia) Neale Fraser	(United Kingdom) Ann Haydon (United States) Dennis Ralston	2–6, 6–3, 13–11

== Grand Slam performance timelines ==
Key
W	F	SF	QF	#R	RR	Q#	DNQ	A	NH

(W) winner; (F) finalist; (SF) semifinalist; (QF) quarterfinalist; (#R) rounds 4, 3, 2, 1; (RR) round-robin stage; (Q#) qualification round; (DNQ) did not qualify; (A) absent; (NH) not held; (SR) strike rate (events won / competed); (W–L) win–loss record.

=== Singles ===
Tournament	1938	1939	1940	1941	1942	1943	1944	1945	1946^{1}	1947^{1}	1948	1949	1950	1951	1952	1953	1954	1955	1956	1957	1958	1959	1960	1961	1962	Career SR
Australian Championships	A	A	A	NH	NH	NH	NH	NH	A	A	A	A	A	A	A	A	A	A	A	A	A	A	A	A	A	0 / 0
French Championships	A	A	NH	R	R	R	R	A	W	SF	A	W	QF	SF	A	A	A	A	A	A	A	A	A	A	A	2 / 5
Wimbledon	A	A	NH	NH	NH	NH	NH	NH	SF	W	SF	F	F	QF	A	A	QF	A	A	A	QF	A	A	A	1R	1 / 9
U.S. Championships	2R	A	3R	SF	SF	QF	F	QF	QF	F	W	W	W	A	A	QF	3R	A	QF	A	3R	A	1R	A	A	3 / 17
SR	0 / 1	0 / 0	0 / 1	0 / 1	0 / 1	0 / 1	0 / 1	0 / 1	1 / 3	1 / 3	1 / 2	2 / 3	1 / 3	0 / 2	0 / 0	0 / 1	0 / 2	0 / 0	0 / 1	0 / 0	0 / 2	0 / 0	0 / 1	0 / 0	0 / 1	6 / 31

=== Women's doubles ===
Tournament	1936	1937	1938	1939	1940	1941	1942	1943	1944	1945	1946^{1}	1947^{1}	1948	1949	1950	1951	1952	1953	1954	1955	1956	1957	1958	1959	1960	1961	1962	Career SR
Australian Championships	A	A	A	A	A	NH	NH	NH	NH	NH	A	A	A	A	A	A	A	A	A	A	A	A	A	A	A	A	A	0 / 0
French Championships	A	A	A	A	NH	R	R	R	R	A	W	W	A	W	F	A	A	A	A	A	A	A	A	A	A	A	A	3 / 4
Wimbledon	A	A	A	A	NH	NH	NH	NH	NH	NH	W	F	W	W	W	F	A	A	W	A	A	A	F	A	A	A	3R	5 / 9
U.S. Championships	QF	A	1R	A	QF	W	W	W	W	W	W	W	W	W	W	A	A	F	F	W	W	W	QF	QF	A	SF	SF	13 / 22
SR	0 / 1	0 / 0	0 / 1	0 / 0	0 / 1	1 / 1	1 / 1	1 / 1	1 / 1	1 / 1	3 / 3	2 / 3	2 / 2	3 / 3	2 / 3	0 / 1	0 / 0	0 / 1	1 / 2	1 / 1	1 / 1	1 / 1	0 / 2	0 / 1	0 / 0	0 / 1	0 / 2	21 / 35

=== Mixed doubles ===
Tournament	1936	1937	1938	1939	1940	1941	1942	1943	1944	1945	1946^{1}	1947^{1}	1948	1949	1950	1951	1952	1953	1954	1955	1956	1957	1958	1959	1960	1961	1962	Career SR
Australian Championships	A	A	A	A	A	NH	NH	NH	NH	NH	A	A	A	A	A	A	A	A	A	A	A	A	A	A	A	A	A	0 / 0
French Championships	A	A	A	A	NH	R	R	R	R	A	A	A	A	A	A	SF	A	A	A	A	A	A	A	A	A	A	A	0 / 1
Wimbledon	A	A	A	A	NH	NH	NH	NH	NH	NH	SF	SF	SF	4R	4R	SF	A	A	F	A	A	A	2R	A	A	A	W	1 / 9
U.S. Championships	2R	A	2R	A	SF	2R	SF	W	W	W	W	SF	F	F	W	A	A	A	F	?	W	SF	W	W	W	A	A	9 / ?
SR	0 / 1	0 / 0	0 / 1	0 / 0	0 / 1	0 / 1	0 / 1	1 / 1	1 / 1	1 / 1	1 / 2	0 / 2	0 / 2	0 / 2	1 / 2	0 / 2	0 / 0	0 / 0	0 / 2	0 / ?	1 / 1	0 / 1	1 / 2	1 / 1	1 / 1	0 / 0	1 /1	10 / ?

R = tournament restricted to French nationals and held under German occupation.
^{1}In 1946 and 1947, the French Championships were held after Wimbledon.

== See also ==
- Performance timelines for all female tennis players since 1978 who reached at least one Grand Slam final
