= Molly Blair =

British tennis player

- Full name: Winifred Lincoln Blair
- Country (sports): United Kingdom
- Born: 4 July 1918 Romford, London, England
- Died: 2 February 2004 (aged 85)

Singles

Grand Slam singles results
- Wimbledon: QF (1949)
- US Open: 3R (1949)

Doubles

Grand Slam doubles results
- Wimbledon: SF (1947, 1948)

Grand Slam mixed doubles results
- Wimbledon: 3R (1947, 1949)

Winifred "Molly" Lincoln Blair (née Lincoln; 4 July 1918 — 2 February 2004) was a British tennis player.

Blair was born in Romford in the east of London and started playing tennis aged 11. She was the 1935 national schoolgirls' champion and in 1936 was runner-up in a junior Wimbledon tournament.

A regular competitor at Wimbledon during the 1940s, Blair twice reached the women's doubles semi-finals. Her best performance in singles came at the 1949 Wimbledon Championships, where she beat French Open champion Nelly Landry in route to the quarter-finals. She played mixed doubles at the tournament with husband Norman Blair.

Blair represented Great Britain in the Wightman Cup from 1946 to 1948. In the 1948 Wightman Cup she earned plaudits for her performance in a surprise doubles win, partnering Jean Bostock against Doris Hart and Patricia Todd, which broke a long sequence of Wightman Cup match losses for the British.
