= Nelly Landry =

Belgian-French tennis player

- Full name: Nelly Adelaïde Jeanne Sylvie Adamson Landry
- Country (sports): Belgium (until 1936); France (1937 onwards)
- Born: 27 December 1916 Orsett, United Kingdom
- Died: 22 February 2010 (aged 93) Paris, France
- Plays: Left-handed

Singles
- Highest ranking: No. 7 (1946)

Grand Slam singles results
- French Open: W (1948)
- Wimbledon: QF (1948)
- US Open: 3R (1948)

Doubles

Grand Slam doubles results
- French Open: F (1938)
- Wimbledon: QF (1948)

Grand Slam mixed doubles results
- French Open: SF (1954)

Nelly Adamson Landry (28 December 1916 – 22 February 2010) was a tennis player from Belgium who became a French citizen after marriage. She was the 1948 women's singles champion at the French Championships where she was seeded third, beating Shirley Fry in a three-set final. She had been a finalist in 1938, losing to Simonne Mathieu, and reached again the final in 1949, losing to Margaret Osborne duPont.

In 1936 and from 1946 until 1948 she won the singles title at the French Covered Court Championships in Paris. She won the singles title at the International Championships of Egypt, played in Alexandria, in 1948 and 1949. In the latter year she also won the Championships of Egypt at the Gezira Sporting Club in Cairo, defeating Annalisa Bossi in the final. In 1948 Landry won the singles, doubles and mixed doubles titles at the Scandinavian Covered Court Championships.

She was the No. 1 ranked Belgian player in 1933. According to John Olliff of The Daily Telegraph and the Daily Mail, Landry was ranked in the world top 10 in 1946 and 1948 (no rankings issued from 1940 through 1945), reaching a career high of world No. 7 in these rankings in 1946. In 1945, 1947, 1948 and 1950 she was ranked No. 1 in France.

Nelly Adamson married Pierre Henri Landry on 8 February 1937 in Bruges and subsequently Marcel Renault, both former French tennis players.

== Grand Slam finals ==
=== Singles (1 title, 2 runners-up) ===
Result	Year	Championship	Surface	Opponent	Score
Loss	1938	French Championships	Clay	(France) Simonne Mathieu	0–6, 3–6
Win	1948	French Championships	Clay	(United States) Shirley Fry	6–2, 0–6, 6–0
Loss	1949	French Championships	Clay	(United States) Margaret Osborne duPont	5–7, 2–6

=== Doubles (1 runner-up) ===
Result	Year	Championship	Surface	Partner	Opponents	Score
Loss	1938	French Championships	Clay	(France) Arlette Halff	(France) Simonne Mathieu (United Kingdom) Billie Yorke	3–6, 3–6

== Grand Slam singles tournament timeline ==
Key
W	F	SF	QF	#R	RR	Q#	DNQ	A	NH

(W) winner; (F) finalist; (SF) semifinalist; (QF) quarterfinalist; (#R) rounds 4, 3, 2, 1; (RR) round-robin stage; (Q#) qualification round; (DNQ) did not qualify; (A) absent; (NH) not held; (SR) strike rate (events won / competed); (W–L) win–loss record.

Tournament	1933	1934	1935	1936	1937	1938	1939	1940	1941 - 1944	1945	1946^{1}	1947^{1}	1948	1949	1950	1951	1952	1953	1954	Career SR
Australian Championships	A	A	A	A	A	A	A	A	NH	NH	A	A	A	A	A	A	A	A	A	0 / 0
French Championships	A	2R	3R	QF	A	F	A	NH	R	A	QF	A	W	F	A	A	A	QF	SF	1 / 9
Wimbledon	1R	2R	1R	4R	A	A	A	NH	NH	NH	A	A	QF	3R	A	A	4R	4R	2R	0 / 9
U.S. Championships	A	A	A	A	A	A	A	A	A	A	A	A	3R	A	A	A	1R	A	A	0 / 2
SR	0 / 1	0 / 2	0 / 2	0 / 2	0 / 0	0 / 1	0 / 0	0 / 0	0 / 0	0 / 0	0 / 1	0 / 0	1 / 3	0 / 2	0 / 0	0 / 0	0 / 2	0 / 2	0 / 2	1 / 20

R = tournament restricted to French nationals and held under German occupation.

^{1}In 1946 and 1947, the French Championships were held after Wimbledon.

== See also ==
- Performance timelines for all female tennis players since 1978 who reached at least one Grand Slam final
