= Joy Mottram =

English tennis player (1928–2018)

- Full name: Joyce Irene Gannon Mottram
- Country (sports): United Kingdom
- Born: 21 March 1928; Enfield, Middlesex, England
- Died: 12 August 2018 (aged 90); Kingston upon Thames, London, England

Singles

Grand Slam singles results
- French Open: QF (1952)
- Wimbledon: 3R (1946, 1947, 1949, 1951)
- US Open: 3R (1951)

Doubles

Grand Slam doubles results
- French Open: F (1949)
- Wimbledon: SF (1949, 1950)

Grand Slam mixed doubles results
- French Open: QF (1952)
- Wimbledon: QF (1949)

Team competitions
- Wightman Cup: F (1951, 1952)

Joyce Irene Mottram (née Gannon; 21 March 1928 – 12 August 2018) was a British tennis player from England who was active in the late 1940s and the 1950s.

== Career ==
Her best singles performances at a Grand Slam tournament came in 1952 when she reached the quarterfinals of the French Championships where she was defeated by third-seeded Dorothy Head in three sets. Mottram competed in seven Wimbledon Championships between 1946 and 1952 and reached the third round of the singles event on four occasions. In the doubles event, she reached the semifinals in 1949 with compatriot Betty Hilton and 1950, with Thelma Coyne Long.

She won the singles title at the Scottish Grass Court Championships in July 1948, defeating Czolowska in the final in two sets. In 1953 and 1954, Mottram reached two consecutive finals at the German Championships in Hamburg. In 1953, she lost to Dorothy Knode, but the following year, she won the title against Inge Pohmann.

In 1951 and 1952, she was a member of the British team that competed in the Wightman Cup, a women's team tennis competition between the United States and Great Britain. These editions were won by the United States and Mottram lost both her doubles matches partnering Pat Ward.

== Personal life and death ==
In 1949, she married Tony Mottram, who was also a tennis player, as were their children Buster Mottram and Linda Mottram. In 1957, she published a book with her husband titled Modern Lawn Tennis.

Joy Mottram died in Kingston upon Thames, London on 12 August 2018, at the age of 90.

== Grand Slam finals ==
=== Doubles: 1 runner-up ===
Result	Year	Championship	Surface	Partner	Opponents	Score
Loss	1949	French Championships	Clay	(United Kingdom) Betty Hilton	(United States) Louise Brough (United States) Margaret Osborne duPont	5–7, 1–6
