= Joan Curry =

British squash and tennis player (1918–2020)

- Born: Patricia Joan Curry; December 1918; Penzance, Cornwall, England
- Died: August 2020 (aged 101); Kingston, London, England
- Occupations: Squash and tennis player
- Spouse(s): George E. Hughesman (m. 1958, died 2004)

Patricia Joan Curry Hughesman (December 1918 – August 2020) was a British squash and tennis player who won the British Open Squash Championships three times in a row from 1947 to 1949. Her toughest victory was in 1948, when she beat the 10-time British Open winner Janet Morgan in five sets. She was also the runner-up at the championship three consecutive times from 1950 to 1952, each time to Morgan.

== Career ==
Curry was born in Penzance, Cornwall in December 1918. In tennis she won the singles title at the British Covered Court Championships in 1949 after a two sets victory in the final against Jean Quertier, conceding just one game. The following year, 1950, she lost her title to Quertier who beat her in a three-sets final. At the British Hard Court Championships in Bournemouth she was a singles runner-up to Australian Nancye Bolton in 1947 and won the title in 1949 and 1950, against Quertier and Mary Terán de Weiss in the final respectively. She won three consecutive singles title at the West of England Championships held in Bristol between 1947 and 1949. In 1955 she won the Penzance Open title. In 1946 and 1950 she was part of the British team that took part in the Wightman Cup, the annual women's team tennis competition between the United States and Great Britain. Curry was interviewed about her career in 2004. She died in Kingston upon Thames, London in August 2020, at the age of 101. The tennis player Patrick Hughesman, who participated in the 1985 and 1987 Wimbledon Championships, is her son.
