= Women medical practitioners in Early Modern Europe =

Early Modern Europe marked a period of transition within the medical world. Universities for doctors were becoming more common and standardized training was becoming a requirement. During this time, a few universities were beginning to train women as midwives, but rhetoric against women healers was increasing. The literature against women in medicine started in the 13th century, and the Early Modern period gave way to a widespread call for licensing and proper training for midwives, which was largely unavailable.

Within family households, however, women continued to heal, as seen in the recipe books many women kept and passed down from generation to generation. Women "were brought up to know how to make medicines and how to use them." The roots of medicine within Europe largely originated from women and their knowledge.

Women medical practitioners were both paid and unpaid. Women were healers whether compensated or not, but harder to separate into specialties as with male healers, because women had no formal guilds. This has resulted in some confusion about what women's roles actually were when it came to medicine.

== Paid labor ==
=== Midwives ===
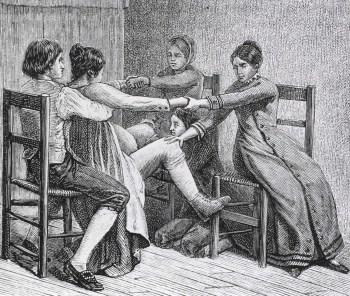
Community helping woman to give birth with a midwife present

Midwifery's move was relatively recent to medical standards of practice. In the 16th century, university training became a norm for male physicians and increasing worry started to permeate throughout Europe concerning midwives and their training. Men did not rival midwives in childbirth care until midwives' training was questioned. It would take four centuries for men to be the majority in childbirth.

Supporters of licensing midwives said was that midwives learned the trade of childbirth through trial and error. As well, midwives were consistently accused of practicing witchcraft. Throughout Europe, midwifery and witchcraft had strong ties. Reasons for those ties included midwives' use of empiricism. This, along with their use of herbs and mixtures, including the highly toxic belladonna, made them a target of the church and claims of witchcraft. Women knew that ergot helped in labor and that certain herbs such as pennyroyal or savin "forced the courses", or in simpler terms, caused abortions. Distrust grew of midwives, especially among middle and upper classes.

Despite increasing backlash, midwives continued to play an important role within communities. Countries such as Spain, Italy, and Holland opened schools for midwives. But these were unaccessible for many women, so apprenticeships continued to play an important role. In France, King Louis XV, concerned about the infant mortality rate combined with the deaths of soldiers in the Seven Years' War, commissioned Angélique du Coudray to travel throughout the country and train both men and women in proper labor and childbirth care in the 18th century. Another important French midwife was Marie Anne Victoire Gillain Boivin, who advocated for formal midwifery training, and in addition, "invented a new pelvimeter and a vaginal speculum and was the first to listen to a fetal heart using a stethoscope." In England, efforts to train midwives differed. There was not much literature written on the subject and the works that were accessible in English were often translated and carried a negative connotation. It was not until 1671 that a woman midwife, Jane Sharp, authored a book about midwifery, entitled The Midwives Book. In it, she encouraged women to continue to being midwives, as they were in other cultures, which was in response to more man-midwives entering the field.

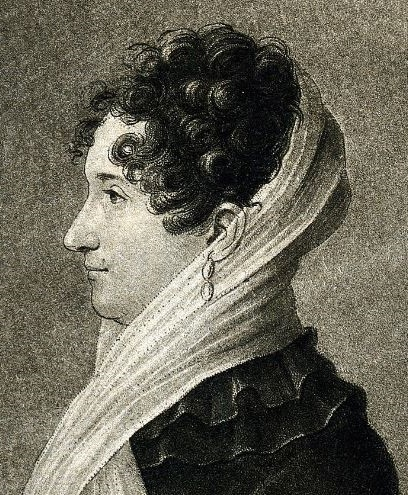
Marie Boivin

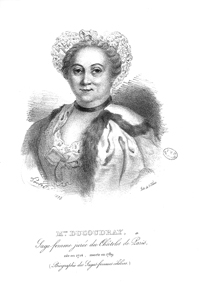
Angélique du Courdray

Medicinal book from Late Modern Europe

Increased pressure put on midwives and their defense, also put midwives in a negative light. One work described them as "shy and sulky", arrogant, superstitious, and that they rushed mothers in delivery.

=== Healers ===
Throughout European history, women were taught knowledge of healing, most often from childhood. When medicine as a profession in 13th century Europe, women healers started to be pushed from view. Licenses began to be required to practice medicine, but even so, this was only enforced for some clienteles. Literate women who often shared clients with trained physicians were the most targeted group for these checks.

While literate women were often targeted for lacking a license, poor women who were the most vulnerable to accusations of witchcraft, due in part, to the trust that women, also named "witch-healers", had in their ability to heal. The church disliked that women healers relied heavily on their intuition and that they trusted that new cures could be discovered.

Those cures consisted of different herbal preparations. They looked at herbs and plants for their medical potential and also for the symbolic factor. Different plants carried different meanings. For example, violets symbolized humility and columbine stood for perseverance and steadfastness. There were also women who were alchemists. One such woman, as recorded by Lady Anne Clifford, was her mother who "was a lover of the study of medicine and the practice of Alchimy. She prepared excellent medicines that did much good to many." Anne would go on to use these same preparations in her own family. She was not the only woman who practiced alchemy. Many women would prepare and study medicine and prepare it on a larger scale.

== Unpaid labor ==
Many women were healers within the home. Healing was seen as a "continuum from domestic caring". Along with healing being universal, so was knowledge of medicinal plants and herbs. Usually, this knowledge was passed throughout a community through word of mouth and also intergenerationally.

=== Recipe books ===
Recipe books were often used to keep track of herbal remedies. These recipe books (also referred to as receipt books) were "highly collaborative, handwritten domestic manuals that included a combination of culinary recipes, medical remedies, and household tips." These recipes were sometimes passed down through generations and continually added to. These cookbooks, in the medieval time period and leading into early modern, were written with a backdrop of famine and failed harvests. As agricultural knowledge developed, recipe books followed it by including more recipes with the "life-saving" vegetables such as carrots that were being turned to. Recipes came from a variety of methods, including personal trial and error. But often, these recipes came from neighbors and others in the community. Some scholars conclude that women's process of finding medical cures influenced the development of science. In fact, herbals, which were books containing knowledge of herbs, had less botanical information than these recipe books did. The recipes themselves followed traditional Galenic medicine, which depended upon the four humors: black bile, yellow bile, phlegm, and blood. Although women are known to be the main keepers of these books, male Physicians also participated. In the cookbook of Sir Hans Sloane, multiple recipes were passed down to him from his mother and grandmother.

=== Recipe ===
"for deafness

Taje the juice if ye Bud. 'leaves,' inner rinde

Or yong branches of elder; Luke war; put'

it in to the yeares; it will breake the

Impoftume within 4 or 5 days : And cure

the deafness"
