= 1981 U.S. Women's Indoor Championships =

Women's tennis tournament

- Date: September 29 – October 4
- Edition: 73rd
- Category: Toyota Series (Category 4)
- Draw: 32S / 16D
- Prize money: $125,000
- Surface: Carpet / indoor
- Location: Bloomington, Minnesota, United States
- Venue: Met Center
- Attendance: 51,635

Champions

Singles
- (United States) Martina Navratilova

Doubles
- (United States) Martina Navratilova / (United States) Pam Shriver
← 1980 ·	U.S. Women's Indoor Championships	· 1982 →

The 1981 U.S. Women's Indoor Championships was a women's tennis tournament played on indoor carpet courts at the Met Center in Bloomington, Minnesota in the United States that was part of the Category 4 tier of the Toyota Series which was incorporated into the 1981 WTA Tour. It was the 73rd edition of the tournament and was held from September 28 through October 4, 1981. Second-seeded Martina Navratilova won the singles title and collect $22,000 first-prize money. Her victory ended Tracy Austin's 28-match win streak.

== Finals ==
=== Singles ===
(United States) Martina Navratilova defeated (United States) Tracy Austin 6–0, 6–2

- It was Navratilova's 7th singles title of the year and the 52nd of her career.

=== Doubles ===
(United States) Martina Navratilova / (United States) Pam Shriver defeated (United States) Rosie Casals / (Australia) Wendy Turnbull 6–3, 7–6

== See also ==
- 1981 U.S. National Indoor Championships – men's tournament
