= US Indoor Championships (disambiguation) =

US Indoor Championships may refer to:

- USA Indoor Track and Field Championships, annual senior national indoor track and field championships
- U.S. National Indoor Championships (1898–2014), defunct indoor tennis tournament
- U.S. Women's Indoor Championships (1907–2001), defunct women's indoor national tennis championship
