= 1980 U.S. Indoor – Michelob Light Classic =

Women's tennis tournament

- Date: September 29 – October 5
- Edition: 72nd
- Category: Colgate Series
- Draw: 32S / 16D
- Prize money: $100,000
- Surface: Carpet / indoor
- Location: Bloomington, Minnesota, United States
- Venue: Met Center

Champions

Singles
- (United States) Tracy Austin

Doubles
- (United States) Ann Kiyomura / (United States) Candy Reynolds
← 1979 ·	U.S. Women's Indoor Championships	· 1981 →

The 1980 U.S. Indoor – Michelob Light Classic was a women's tennis tournament played on indoor carpet courts at the Met Center in Bloomington, Minnesota in the United States that was part of the Colgate Series which was incorporated into the 1980 WTA Tour. It was the 72nd edition of the tournament and was held from September 29 through October 5, 1980. First-seeded Tracy Austin won the singles title.

== Finals ==
=== Singles ===
(United States) Tracy Austin defeated (Australia) Dianne Fromholtz 6–1, 2–6, 6–2

- It was Austin's 9th singles title of the year and the 19th of her career.

=== Doubles ===
(United States) Ann Kiyomura / (United States) Candy Reynolds defeated (United States) Anne Smith / (United States) Paula Smith 6–3, 4–6, 6–1

- It was Reynold's 2nd doubles title of the year and of her career.

== See also ==
- 1980 U.S. National Indoor Championships – men's tournament
