= 1979 US Indoor Championships =

- Date: October 1–7
- Edition: 71st
- Category: Colgate Series (AAAA)
- Draw: 32S / 16D
- Prize money: $100,000
- Surface: Carpet (Sporteze) / indoor
- Location: Bloomington, United States
- Venue: Met Center
- Attendance: 56,011

Champions

Singles
- (Australia) Evonne Goolagong

Doubles
- (United States) Billie Jean King / (United States) Martina Navratilova
← 1978 ·	U.S. Women's Indoor Championships	· 1980 →

The 1979 US Indoor Championships, also known by its sponsored name Michelob Light Classic, was a women's tennis tournament played on indoor carpet courts at the Met Center in Bloomington, Minnesota in the United States. The event was part of the AAAA (Note: Tournaments with prize money for the women of at least $150,000.) category of the 1979 Colgate Series. It was the 71st edition of the tournament and was held from October 1 through October 7, 1979. Fourth-seeded Evonne Goolagong won the singles title, her second at the event after 1973, and earned $20,000 first-prize money.

== Finals ==
=== Singles ===
(Australia) Evonne Goolagong defeated (Australia) Dianne Fromholtz 6–3, 6–4

- It was Goolagong's 3rd singles title of the year and 82nd of her career.

=== Doubles ===
(United States) Billie Jean King / (United States) Martina Navratilova defeated (Netherlands) Betty Stöve / (Australia) Wendy Turnbull 6–4, 7–6^{(9–7)}

== Prize money ==
Event	W	F	3rd	4th	QF	Round of 16	Round of 32
Singles	$20,000	$10,000	$4,950	$4,650	$2,100	$1,100	$550

== See also ==
- 1979 U.S. National Indoor Championships – men's tournament
