= 1982 U.S. Women's Indoor Championships =

Women's tennis tournament

- Date: September 27 – October 3
- Edition: 73rd
- Category: Toyota Series (Category 4)
- Draw: 32S / 16D
- Prize money: $125,000
- Surface: Carpet / indoor
- Location: Philadelphia, PA, U.S.
- Venue: Spectrum

Champions

Singles
- (United States) Barbara Potter

Doubles
- (United States) Rosie Casals / (Australia) Wendy Turnbull
← 1981 ·	U.S. Women's Indoor Championships	· 1983 →

The 1982 U.S. Women's Indoor Championships was a women's tennis tournament played on indoor carpet courts at the Spectrum in Philadelphia, Pennsylvania in the United States that was part of the Category 4 tier of the Toyota Series which was incorporated into the 1982 WTA Tour. It was the 73rd edition of the tournament and was held from September 27 through October 3, 1982. Fourth-seeded Barbara Potter won the singles title and collect $22,000 first-prize money.

== Finals ==
=== Singles ===
(United States) Barbara Potter defeated (United States) Pam Shriver 6–4, 6–2

- It was Potter's 2nd singles title of the year and the 3rd of her career.

=== Doubles ===
(United States) Rosie Casals / (Australia) Wendy Turnbull defeated (United States) Barbara Potter / (United States) Sharon Walsh 3–6, 7–6^{(7–5)}, 6–4

== See also ==
- 1982 U.S. National Indoor Championships – men's tournament
