= 1978 US Indoor Championships =

- Date: October 9–15
- Edition: 70th
- Category: Colgate Series (AAAA)
- Draw: 32S / 16D
- Prize money: $100,000
- Surface: Carpet / indoor
- Location: Bloomington, United States
- Venue: Met Center
- Attendance: 45,000

Champions

Singles
- (United States) Chris Evert

Doubles
- (Australia) Kerry Reid / (Australia) Wendy Turnbull
← 1976 ·	U.S. Women's Indoor Championships	· 1979 →

The 1978 US Indoor Championships was a women's singles tennis tournament played on indoor carpet courts at the Met Center in Bloomington, Minnesota in the United States. The event was part of the AAAA (Note: Tournaments with prize money for the women of at least $150,000.) category of the 1978 Colgate Series. It was the 70th edition of the tournament and was held from October 9 through October 15, 1978. Second-seeded Chris Evert won the singles title and earned $20,000 first-prize money.

== Finals ==
=== Singles ===
(United States) Chris Evert defeated (United Kingdom) Virginia Wade 6–7^{(4–7)}, 6–2, 6–4

- It was Evert's 5th singles title of the year and 83rd of her career.

=== Doubles ===
(Australia) Kerry Reid / (Australia) Wendy Turnbull defeated (Australia) Lesley Hunt / (South Africa) Ilana Kloss 6–3, 6–3

== Prize money ==
Event	W	F	SF	QF	Round of 16	Round of 32
Singles	$20,000	$10,000	$4,800	$2,250	$1,100	$600

== See also ==
- 1978 U.S. National Indoor Championships – men's tournament
