= Margarett Sargent =

American painter

Margarett Williams Sargent
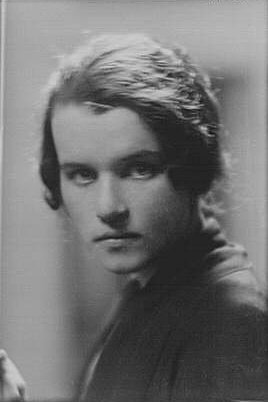
- Margarett Sargent, 1915, by Arnold Genthe
- Born: August 31, 1892; Boston, US
- Died: 1978 (aged 85–86)
- Education: Gutzon Borglum, George Luks
- Movement: Ashcan School

Margarett Williams Sargent (August 31, 1892 – 1978) was a noted painter in the Ashcan School and a follower of George Luks. She exhibited as Margarett Sargent and Margarett W. McKean.

== Early life and education ==
Margarett Williams Sargent was born on August 31, 1892, on Commonwealth Avenue, Boston, the daughter of Francis Williams Sargent (1848–1920) and Jane Welles Hunnewell (1851–1936). She was a distant relative of John Singer Sargent.

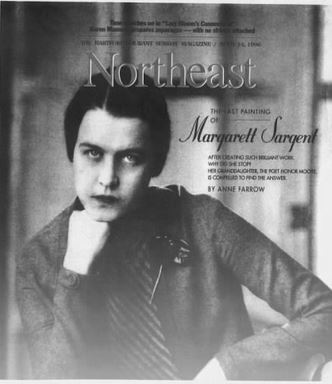
Margarett Sargent by Berenice Abbott, 1928

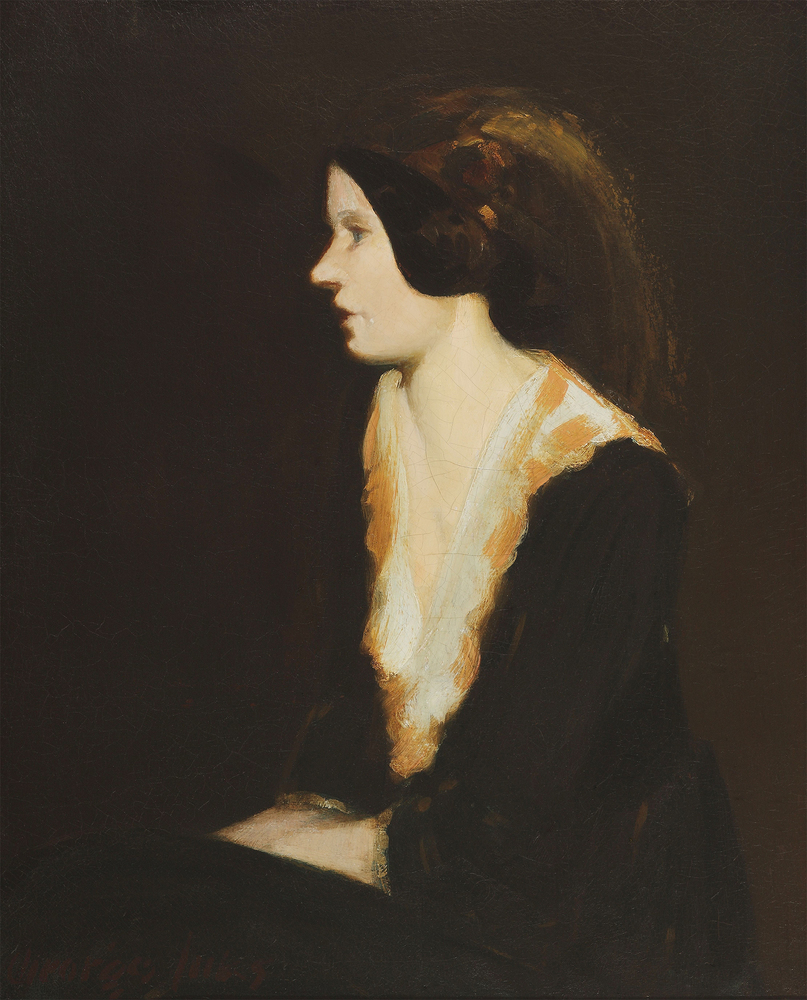
The White Blackbird (Portrait of Margarett Sargent), 1919, George Luks

Sargent attended Miss Porter's School. After breaking a first engagement with Eddie Morgan, who was not accepted by her family, she trained as a sculptor in Italy, but later turned to watercolors and oils.

== Career ==
Sargent first exhibited as a sculptor in 1916 at the Art Institute of Chicago's annual exhibition. She was creating portraits of children and animals, but in 1917 decided to study with sculptor Gutzon Borglum. Through him, she met George Luks, a painter who became her artistic mentor. The sculptural portrait she did of Luks and entered in the Pennsylvania Academy annual show was praised by critics. In 1919, Luks portrayed her from memory in The White Blackbird. This title stemmed from her extremely pale complexion set off by her very dark hair.

Luks introduced her to John Kraushaar, a New York dealer whose Fifth Avenue gallery hosted Sargent's first solo exhibition in 1926. She later had shows in Boston and Chicago. Her paintings have been described as "intense, bold, and expressive."The portraits she painted, which constituted a majority of her work, followed modernest tendencies. The person was shown in a simplified form, but the face was highlighted and more decoratively painted. She stopped painting in 1936, when it had gotten "too intense" for her, as she told her granddaughter.

== Personal life and family ==
Her granddaughter, Honor Moore suggests she may have had an affair with her New York roommate, Marjorie Davenport. Fanny Brice lived downstairs to them. Sargent became friends with gallerist Betty Parsons, a friendship that would last for life. Another friend was socialite Vivian Pickman.

In 1920, Margarett Sargent married Quincy Adams Shawn Mckean (November 1, 1891 – August 1971), a polo player from an old Boston family. The courtship had begun in 1912, at Sargent's debut ball. In 1920 Shawn Mckean bought the Samuel Corning House in Beverly, Massachusetts. The house was listed on the National Register of Historic Places in 1990. They had four children in three years: Q.A. Shaw Jr, Margarett "Margie", Jenny and Harry. In 1941 Margarett McKean (1922-2013) married Wally Reed. In 1944 Jenny McKean, married the Right Reverend Paul Moore Jr. and their daughter is author Honor Moore. In 1949 Margarett McKean remarried to Barclay H. Warburton III (divorced in 1959), the step-son of William Kissam Vanderbilt II. In 1952 Q.A. Shaw McKean, Jr., married Linda Huntington Borden, the daughter of John C. Borden. In 1966 Margarett McKean remarried to Stephen B. Vernon.

She was friends with Berenice Abbott, who took her portrait in Paris in 1928. Frederic Clay Bartlett, who courted her, sketched her in Paris; in the 1930s the sketch hung in Bartlett's house at 1301 Astor Street, Chicago.

During her marriage, Sargent had both male and female lovers, and her husband as well had female lovers. One of Sargent's lovers was heiress Isabel Pell. Sargent said that Isabell was "handsome, wonderfully handsome". Pell used to visit Sargent at her Prides Crossing, Beverly, Massachusetts mansion, and was well known by both Sargent's husband, Quincy Adams Shaw McKean, and children, who called Pell "cousin Pell". Another male lover of Sargent was a young John Walker, who was to become the director of the National Gallery in Washington.

Sargent was an alcoholic and a frequent patient in sanitariums and received electroconvulsive therapy. After divorcing her, Mckean married Katherine Winthrop, whom he had met while still married to Sargent.

Margarett Williams Sargent died in 1978.

== Exhibitions ==
- "Sculptures and Water Colors", C.W. Kraushaar Art Galleries, March 1926
- "Decorative Panels and Watercolors", C.W. Kraushaar Art Galleries, March 29 – April 12, 1927
- "Exhibition of Paintings by Margarett Sargent", C.W. Kraushaar Art Galleries, January 3 – 18, 1929
- "Exhibition of Margarett Sargent", Harvard Society for Contemporary Art, February 7–22, 1930
- "Exhibition of Margarett Sargent", 38 paintings, Arts Club of Chicago, November 28 - December 13, 1930
- "One Woman Show", C.W. Kraushaar Art Galleries, January 1931
- "Painting and Sculpture from 16 American Cities", December 11, 1933 – January 7, 1934, The Museum of Modern Art
- "Margarett Sargent", September 12 - October 5, 1996. Berry Hill Galleries, New York
- "Margarett Sargent", The Bold and the Beautiful, March 25, 2017, Cape Ann Museum

== Legacy ==
In 1996 Sargent's granddaughter, Honor Moore, published The White Blackbird: A Life of the Painter Margarett Sargent by Her Granddaughter.
