= 1976 U.S. National Indoor Open Championships =

- Date: February 14–22
- Edition: 6th
- Category: USTA-IPA Indoor Circuit
- Draw: 53S / 20D
- Prize money: $50,000
- Surface: Carpet / Indoor
- Location: Salisbury, Maryland, U.S.
- Venue: Wicomico Youth and Civic Center

Champions

Singles
- (Romania) Ilie Năstase

Doubles
- (United States) Fred McNair / (United States) Sherwood Stewart
- U.S. National Indoor Championships

The 1976 U.S. National Indoor Open Championships was a men's tennis tournament held at the Wicomico Youth and Civic Center in Salisbury, Maryland in the United States. The event was part of the 1976 USTA-IPA Indoor Circuit. It was the sixth edition of the tournament and was held from February 14 through February 22, 1976, and was played on indoor carpet courts. Second-seeded Ilie Năstase won the singles title and earned $9,000 first-prize money.

== Finals ==
=== Singles ===
(Romania) Ilie Năstase defeated (United States) Jimmy Connors 6–2, 6–3, 7–6^{(9–7)}

- It was Năstase's 2nd singles title of the year, and the 55th of his career.

=== Doubles ===
(United States) Fred McNair / (United States) Sherwood Stewart defeated (United States) Steve Krulevitz / (United States) Trey Waltke 6–3, 6–2

- It was McNair's 1st doubles title of the year and the 7th of his career. It was Stewart's 2nd doubles title of the year and the 8th of his career.

== See also ==
- 1976 US Indoor Championships – women's tournament
