= Jane Sharp =

English midwife, c. 1641–1671

Jane Sharp (fl. 1641–1671) was an English midwife. Her work The Midwives Book: or the Whole Art of Midwifery Discovered, published in 1671, was the first on the subject to be produced by an Englishwoman.

== Life ==
Little is known of Sharp's life beyond her publication. The title page of her book claims that she had been a "practitioner in the art of midwifry [sic] above thirty years." She is believed to have practised in London, although Sharp's name does not appear in any Church of England registration books or in witness signatures on any of almost 500 London midwifery certificates surviving from 1661–1669. Nor does she appear on any registers of the Catholic Church at the time. Sharp may have been a Puritan, which would account for her literacy: Puritan women were more frequently literate than Catholics or Anglicans. Her ability to write and to travel to and from London suggests she may have been economically advantaged, but it is unclear whether she received a formal education. While no marriage records have been found, it appears that Jane Sharp had either a daughter or a daughter-in-law, for the midwife Anne Parrott of St. Clement Danes in London, bequeathed a small sum to "Sarah Sharp the daughter of Jane Sharp".

With little known of the person's life and no record of her death, some have proposed that Jane Sharp is a pseudonym. Such were often attached to their work by women in the Early Modern period.

== Profession ==
It is not known whether Sharp received any formal education, but she claims to have practised midwifery for 30 years. As a midwife, Sharp may have been educated, but unlike male surgeons of the time, midwives rarely received formal medical training. Instead they learnt through practice what was one of a few professions available to women in that period, sanctioned by Anglican and Catholic parishes throughout the 16th and 17th centuries. Though men began to enter the field, English social norms at the time saw birthing as a feminine practice and discouraged men from intervening in it. Most births in Sharp's time took place in the mother's home, where a female midwife would preside. Jane Sharp, in her practical advice, urges women to adopt a comfortable position during labour, even an upright birth in a birthing chair.

Beyond that, Sharp's writing extends into medical matters. While women dominated in midwifery, men received formal education to become physicians and surgeons. She wrote for women about their medical issues using the accepted medical knowledge of the period and her own practical experience to fill in her readers' medical knowledge.

== The Midwives Book ==
The first edition of The Midwives Book, or, The Whole Art of Midwifry Discovered appeared in 1671. Subsequent editions in 1674, 1724 and 1725. The first two were published by Simon Miller and the third and fourth posthumously by John Marshall as The Compleat Midwife's Companion. Published as a small octavo, The Midwives Book was a lengthy 95,000 words selling for two shillings and sixpence (12.5 pence). Its length and price suggest a higher-class target audience, but whereas its text is aimed mainly at practising midwives, beginning with a direct address:

TO THE MIDWIVES OF ENGLAND.

Sisters. I Have often sate down sad in the Consideration of the many Miseries Women endure in the Hands of unskilful Midwives; many professing the Art (without any skill in Anatomy, which is the Principal part effectually necessary for a Midwife) meerly for Lucres sake. I have been at Great Cost in Translations for all Books, either French, Dutch, or Ita∣lian of this kind. All which I offer with my own Experience. Humbly begging the assistance of Almighty God to aid you in this Great Work, and am Your Affectionate Friend

Jane Sharp.

— Jane Sharp, The Midwives Book, Preface

The first edition of The Midwives Book is dedicated to Sharp's "much esteemed and ever honoured friend" Lady Elleanour Talbutt, an unmarried sister of John Talbot, 10th Earle of Shrewsbury, further suggesting Sharp's connection to Western England. Its title page states that Sharp was a "Practitioner in the Art of midwivry above thirty years" at the time of printing. Later editions, including the posthumous The Compleat Midwife's Companion published in 1724, states that Sharp had practised "above forty years".

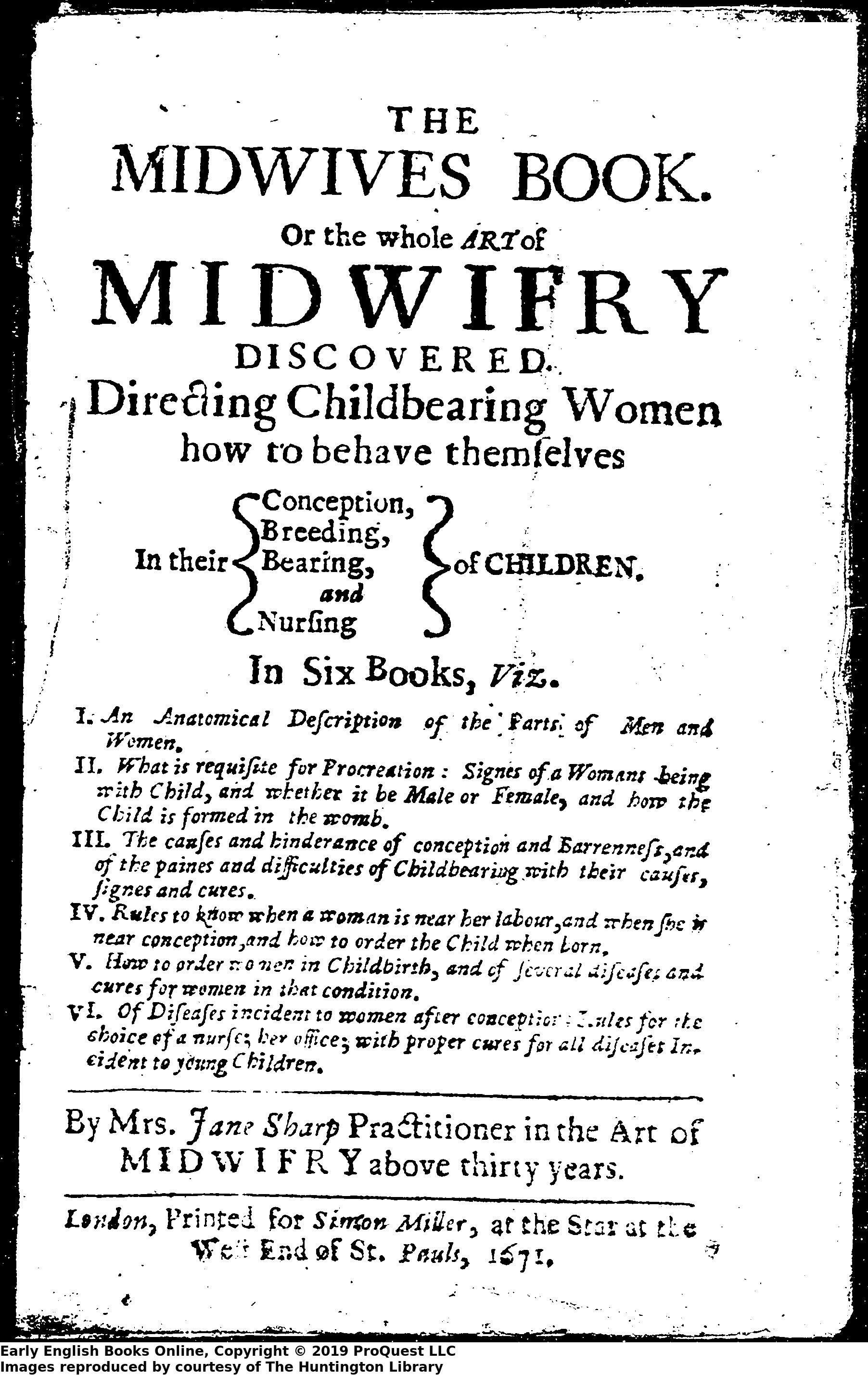
Title page of The Midwives Book, or, the Whole Art of Midwifry Discovered by Jane Sharp (1671)

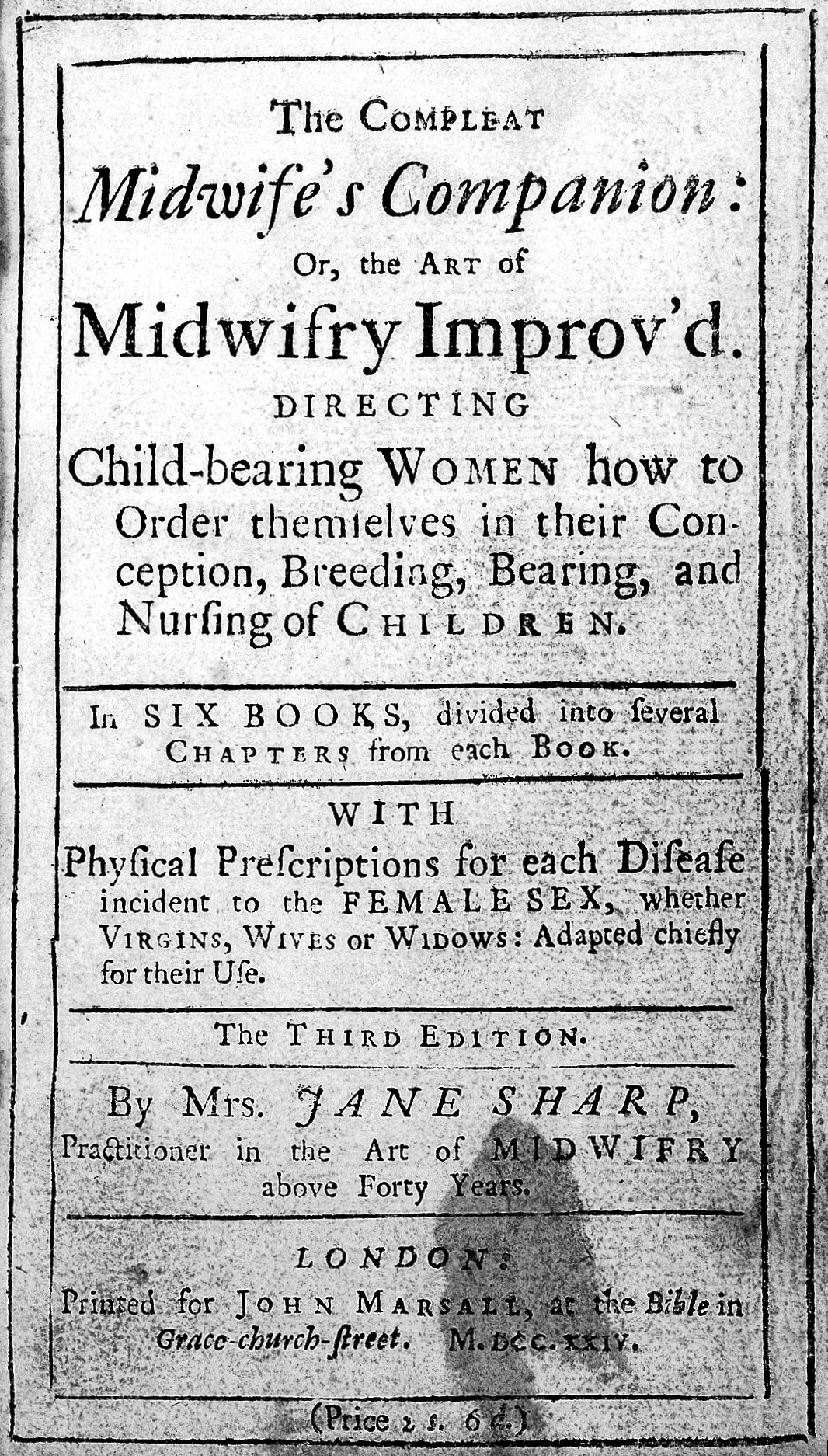
Title page of The Compleat Midwife's Companion

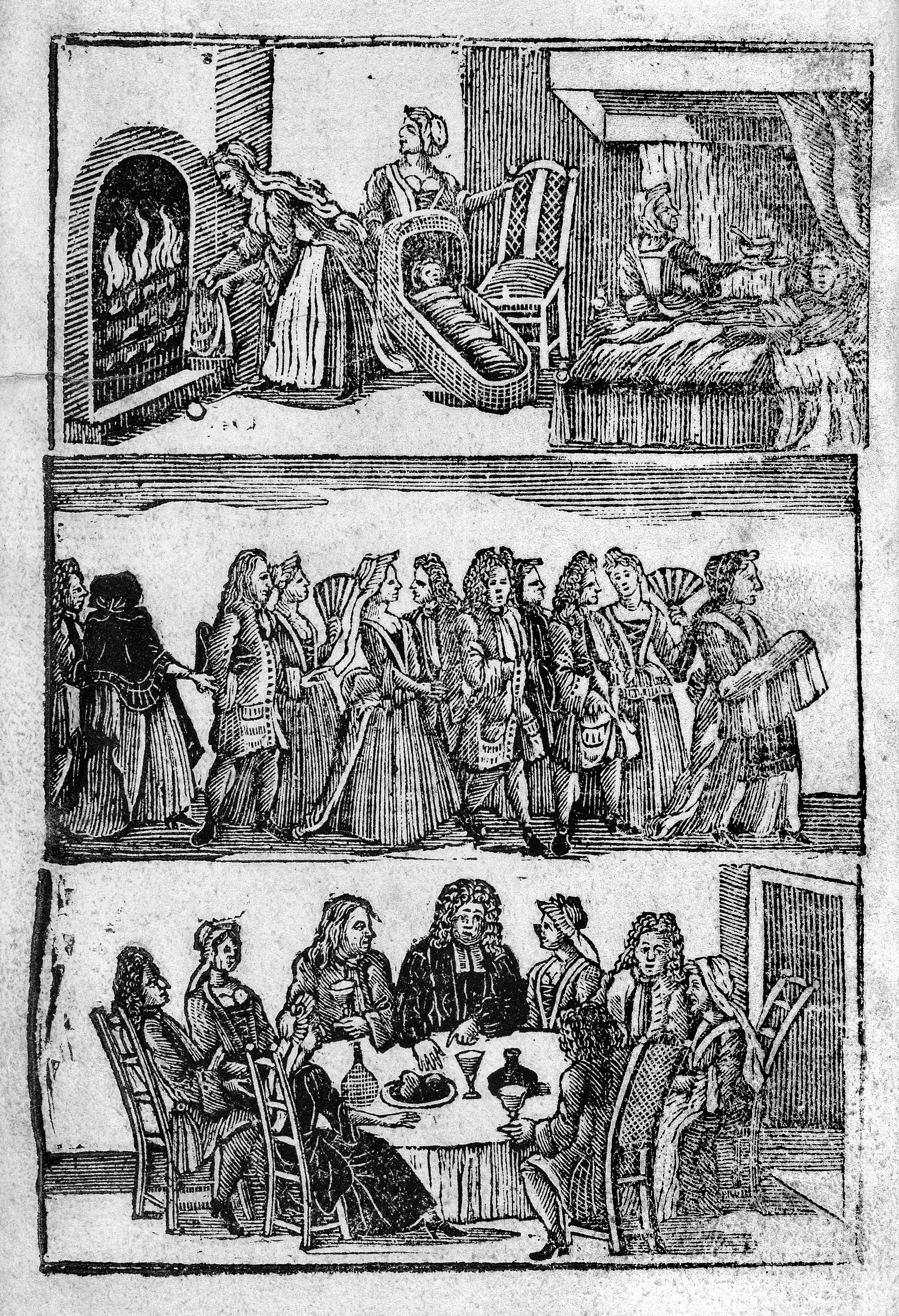
Frontispiece of The Compleat Midwife's Companion

== Purpose and structure ==
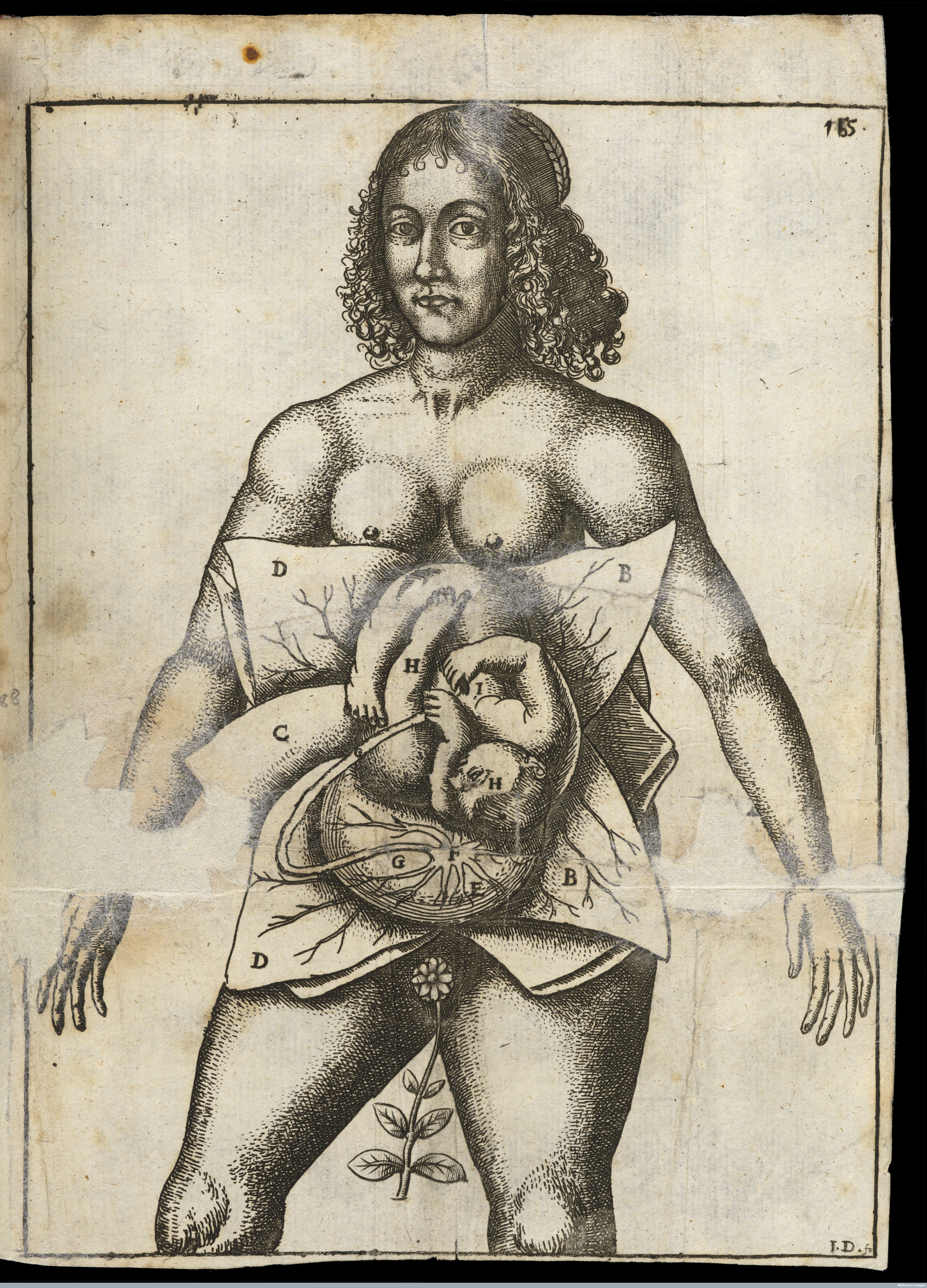
Sharp's depiction of a woman ready to give birth.

The Midwives Book as published in 1671 instructed women how to conceive a child, maintain pregnancy, prepare for childbirth, bear a child, and care for a woman after childbirth. This meant it was intended as a manual not only for midwives, but for women and men to learn about anatomy and sexuality. Most midwifery manuals of the period came from men, some of whom had never witnessed a childbirth, Sharp's book focuses on the practices. She uses her practical guide also as a platform for her views on women's education, male midwives and female sexuality. It was also notable for its use of the vernacular; Sharp eschewed "hard words... are but the shell" of knowledge.

The manual divides into six parts:

1. An Anatomical Description of the Parts of Men and Women (the anatomy of male and female sexual organs and their use in reproduction)
2. What is requisite for Procreation: Signes of a Womans being with Child, and whether it be Male or Female, and how the Child is formed in the womb (describing sexual reproduction, advising on how to conceive, and noting signs of pregnancy and the process of gestation)
3. The causes and hinderance of conception and Barrenness, and of the paines and difficulties of Childbearing with their causes, signes and cures (advice on how to promote fertility and to care for pregnant women)
4. Rules to know when a woman is near her labour, and when she is near conception, and how to order the Child when born (guidance on preparing women for labour, offering roles and responsibilities for midwives and both parents, and on examining and caring for a newborn child)
5. How to order women in Childbirth, and of several diseases and cures for women in that condition (instructing midwives on how to manage childbirth under a variety of conditions and circumstances, and how to care for women with various possible ailments during pregnancy and delivery)
6. Of Diseases incident to women after conception; Rules for the choice of a nurse; her office; with proper cures for all diseases Incident to young Children (addressing aspects of post-natal care for the woman and her newborn child, including nutritional support for the child, breastfeeding techniques, and care for various venereal diseases, notably syphilis).

== Phraseology ==
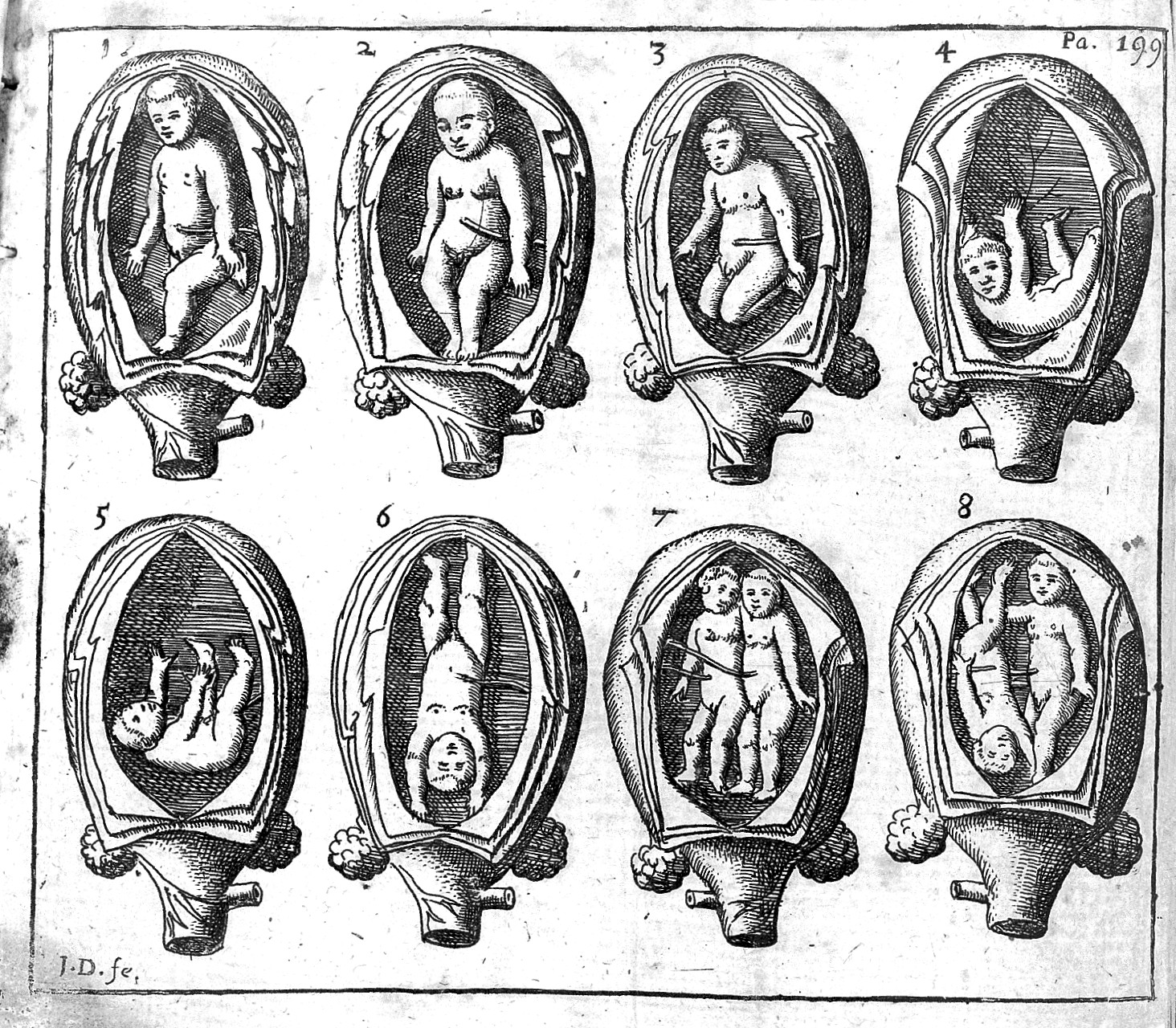
Sharp's depiction of fetus(es) in utero.

Sharp's writing draws from accepted medical knowledge of the time, suggesting she was well read in scientific and medical publications. By writing in the vernacular, she conveyed surgical and pharmacological techniques to women training to be midwives, so that they need not always depend on male physicians when birthing complications or emergencies arose.

Sharp also employs techniques of commonplacing, a familiar science-writing practice of the time. As with scrapbooks and commonplace books, it includes information on other memorable sources, along with notes, quotations, tables and drawings. Her use of commonplacing allowed Sharp to integrate existing academic knowledge of anatomy, childbirth and women's health, while adding her practical expertise. She could also affirm and correct medical knowledge on women's anatomy, reproduction and childbirth. For instance, she cites ancient scientific understanding of the humorous body as developed and used by Aristotle, Hippocrates and Galen, which presumed that a woman's menstrual blood feeds a fetus. She then explains the dominant hypothesis of her day, from "Fernelius, Pliny, Columells, and Columbus", who claimed that menstrual blood poisoned a fetus. Her own observations correct both theories: "But to answer all... Hippocrates was mistaken... [for] if the child be not fed with this blood what becomes of this blood when women are with child?" By commonplacing directly from academic sources, Sharp not only places her knowledge in established medical traditions, but legitimates the expertise that comes from practising midwifery as a means of expanding medical knowledge.

Thus Sharp challenged and improved on the academic methods of trained male physicians with empirically based corrections from her practical experience, and created an accessible guide to women's anatomy that questioned the authority of academic knowledge.

== Personal beliefs ==
Sharp's book combines the medical knowledge of the time with personal anecdotes and argues that midwifery should be reserved for women, at a time when male midwives were becoming more common. She urged female midwives to learn surgical and pharmacological techniques instead of depending on male physicians when complications arose. Although the knowledge gained by men at universities might carry more prestige, it usually lacked the experience found in female midwives. Culpeper's admission that he had never attended an actual birth is a prime example. Sharp stresses how practice and experience in combination with medical texts produces the best clinician, not theoretical knowledge alone: '"It is not hard words that perform the work, as if none understood the Art that cannot understand Greek. Words are but the shell, that we often break our Teeth with them to come at the kernel."'

In opposing the trend towards male midwives, she expressed a belief that women were naturally inclined toward midwifery. She acknowledged that men had better access to education and tended to have greater theoretical knowledge, but she deplored their lack of practical understanding. She called on female midwives to end their reliance on male doctors entirely and learn how to deal with emergencies and complications themselves. Complaining of the inadequacies in female education, she noted that "women cannot attain so rarely to the knowledge of things as many [men] may, who are bred up in universities."

== Other midwifery manuals ==
The Midwives Book drew on contemporary sources such as Nicholas Culpepper's A Directory for Midwives (1651) and Daniel Sennert's Practical Physick (1664), but in doing so corrected misinformation and changed their tone to reflect her own protofeminist views.

The midwifery manuals in England began with The Byrth of Mankynd, a 1540 translation of Eucharius Rösslin's Der Rosengarten. From then until the publication of The Midwives Book, such manuals were dominated by male authors without practical experience. Rather than consult midwives and mothers, they drew on ancient Greek translations and other midwifery manuals written by inexperienced men. Such writers exhibited a grotesque fascination with female sexuality, reflecting an understanding of women as hypersexual, excessive, weak, and inferior beings, valuable solely in terms of usefulness to men.

The introduction to the 1999 publication of The Midwives Book states, "For all the parallels between The Midwives Book and its male equivalents, then, the differences in detail result in a fundamental shift in the way sexuality and gender are conceptualized."

== Impact ==
The Midwives Book: or the Whole Art of Midwifry Discovered gave valuable advice at a time when midwifery faced change. Its popularity indicates that it was probably a household item in the 18th century. It remained in print as a primary source on women, childbirth and sexuality in the Early Modern period.

Karen Cushman's 1991 children's novel The Midwife's Apprentice features a character based on Jane Sharp. It won the Newbery Medal in 1996.
