= Eucharius Rösslin =

German physician (c. 1470–1526)

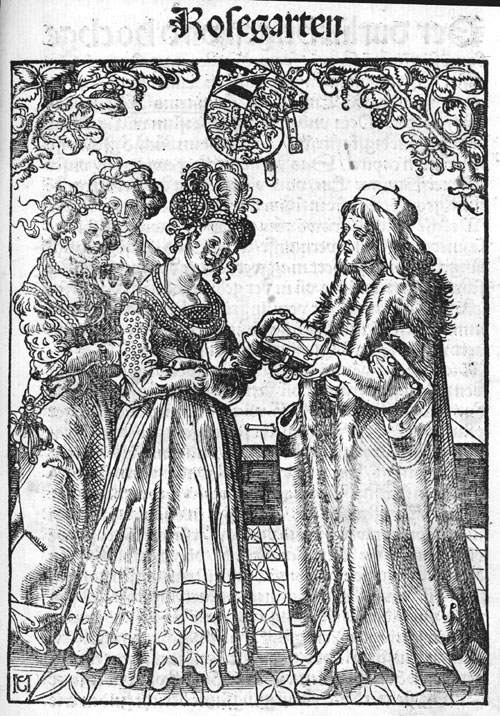
Eucharius Rösslin presents Der Rosengarten to Catherine of Pomerania-Wolgast

Eucharius Rösslin (Roslin, Rößlin), sometimes known as Eucharius Rhodion, (c. 1470 – 1526) was a German physician who in 1513 wrote a book about childbirth called Der Rosengarten (The Rose Garden), which became a standard medical text for midwives. Its full title was Der schwangern Frauwen und Hebammen Rosengarten (The rose garden of pregnant women and midwives).

== Midwifery ==
Rösslin was an apothecary at Freiburg before being elected physician to the city of Frankfurt on Main in 1506. He served as physician to the city of Worms in the service of Katherine, wife of Henry IV, Duke of Brunswick-Lüneburg. While examining and supervising the city's midwives, he found their practice of midwifery to be careless and substandard, leading to high rates of infant mortality. As a result, he wrote his book in German, to make it accessible, and published it in the then-German city of Strasbourg. He included in it engravings by Martin Caldenbach, a pupil of Albrecht Dürer. Der Rosengarten gave for the first time printed illustrations of the birthing chair, the lying-in chamber, and the positions of the fetus in utero.

Alongside his direct observation of midwifery at Worms, Rösslin incorporated information gleaned from writers of antiquity such as Muscio and Soranus of Ephesus. In the introductory prologue to the text, written in verse, Rösslin emphasizes the importance of the role of men in reproduction and blames midwives who "through neglect and oversight... destroy children far and wide." He threatens midwives with a warning that God will call them to account. "And since no midwife that I've asked / Could tell me anything of her task / I'm left to my medical education." The book has "notably negative views of female midwives and mothers in favour of a male-led science of child birth".

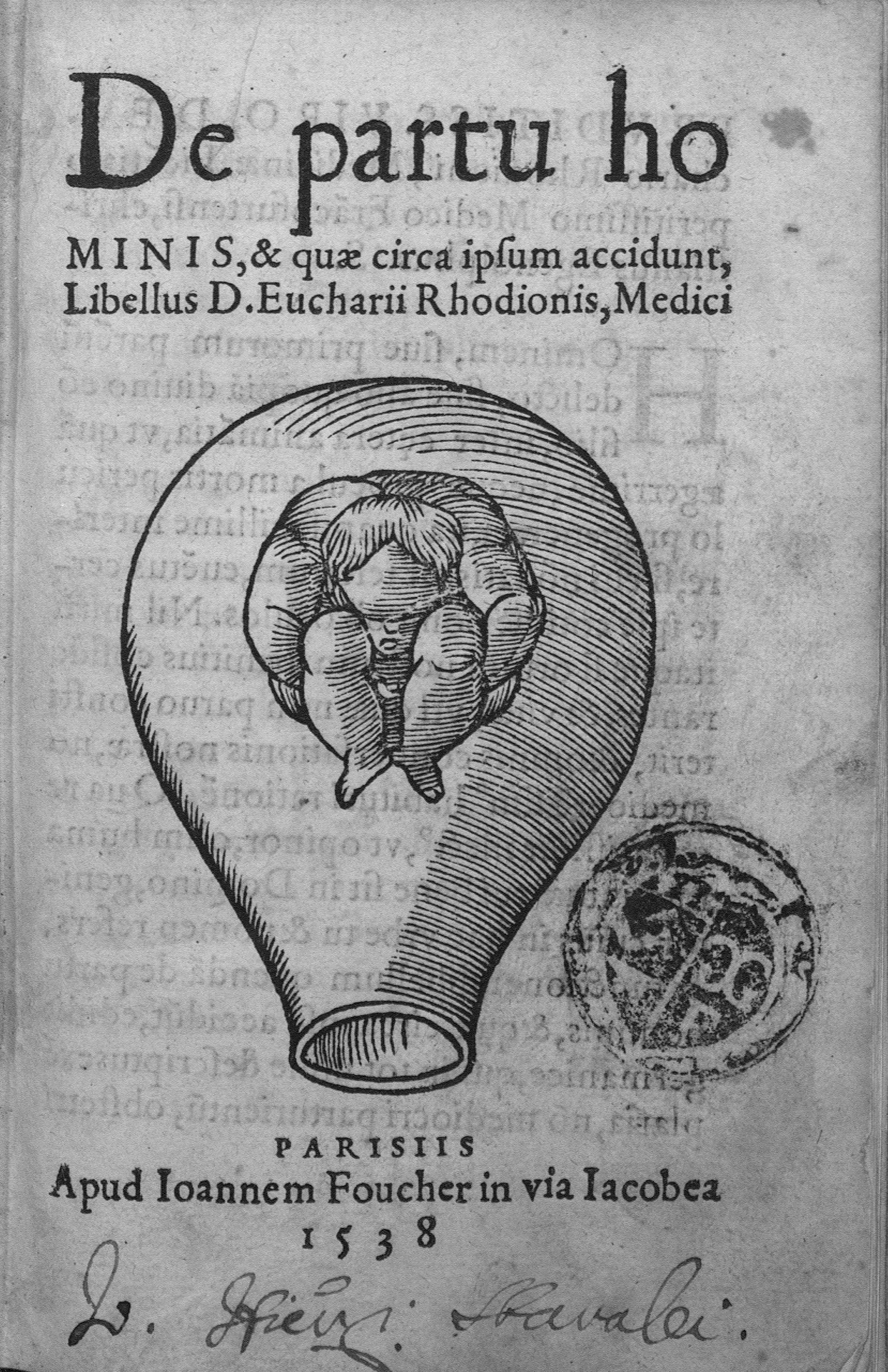
De partu hominis

== Success ==
The book was an immediate success. By the mid-16th century, it had been translated into all the main European languages and had gone through numerous editions.

It appeared in English in 1540 as The Byrth of Mankynde, translated by Richard Jonas. An expanded English version of 1545 has a "repeated emphasis of the importance of the mother. This is absent from the German original".

Rösslin returned to his original job in Frankfurt in 1517, where he remained until his death in 1526.

His son, Eucharius Rösslin the Younger, succeeded his father as town physician. He wrote a book on minerals and mineral use, and published a Latin translation of his father's book as Rosengarten, De Parti Hominis in 1532.

== Der Rosengarten ==
And when the time of labour is come, in the same stoole ought to be put many clothes or crows in the backe of it, the which the midwife may remove from one side to another, according as necessity shall require. The Midwife her selfe shall sit before the labouring woman, and shall diligently observe and waite, how much, and after what meanes the child sitrreth itselfe: also shall with hands, first anoynted with the oyle of almonds or the oyle of those white lillies, rule and direct everything as shall seeme best. Also the midwife must instruct and comfort the party, not only refreshing her with good meate and drinke, but also with sweet words, giving her hope of a good speedie deliverance, encouraging and enstomacking her to patience and tolerance, bidding her to hold in her breath as much as she may, also stroking gently with her hands her belly about the Navell, for that helpeth to depress the birth downeward.

== Gallery ==
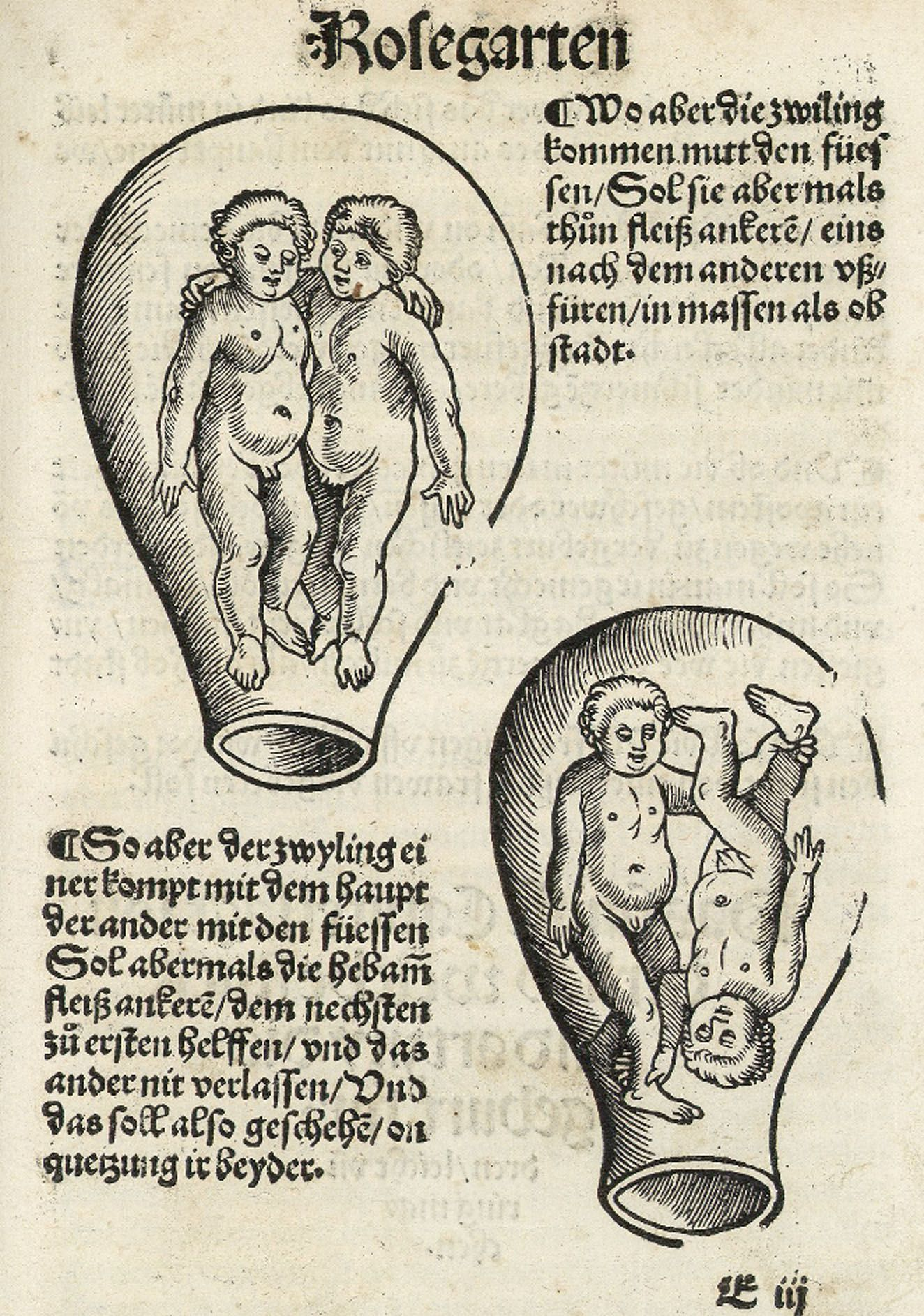
Presentation (obstetrics) illustration

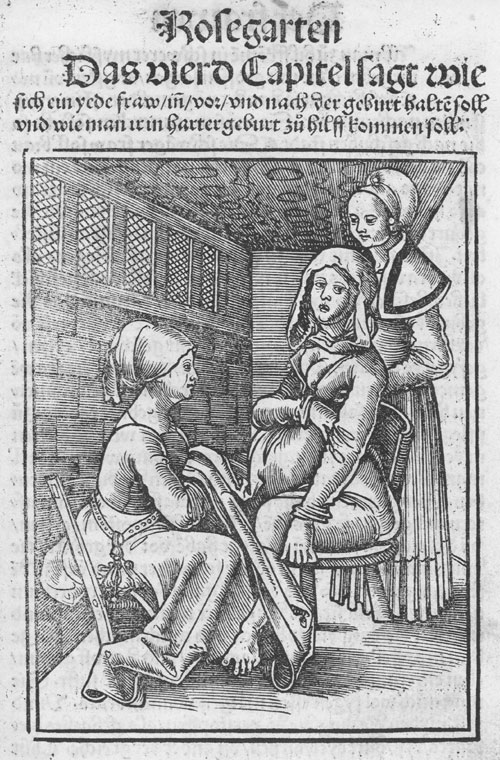
4th Chapter illustration. A woman giving birth on a birth chair.
