= Samuel Corning House =

Historic house in Massachusetts, United States

- U.S. National Register of Historic Places
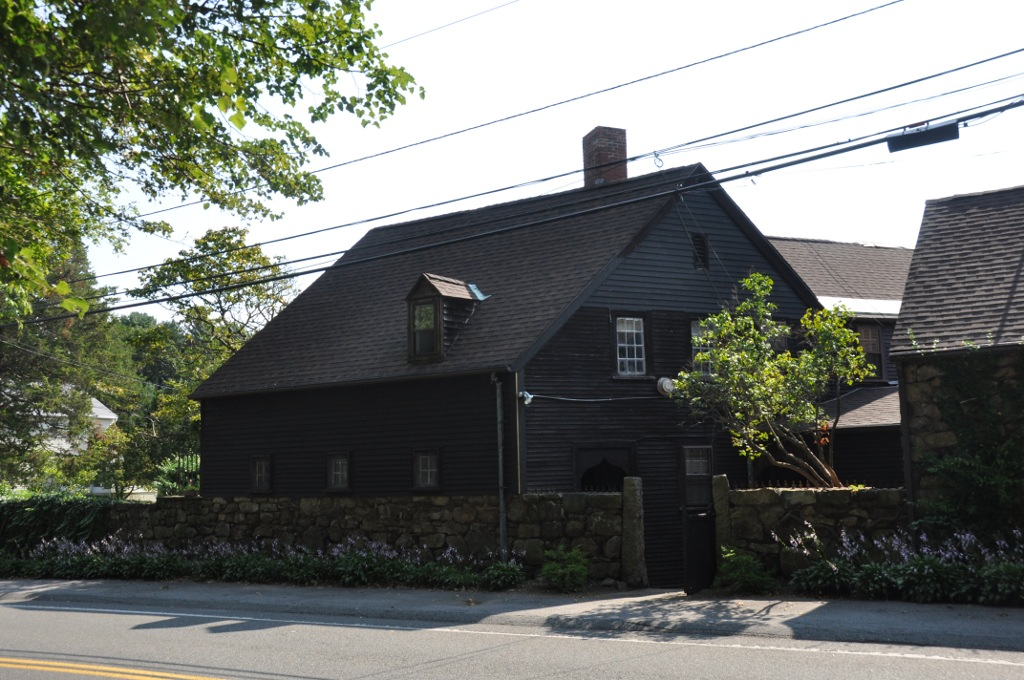

- Location within Massachusetts Location within the United States
- Location: 87 Hull Street, Beverly, Massachusetts
- Coordinates: 42°34′49″N 70°50′23″W
- Built: c.1700; c.1720, 1921
- Architect: Joseph D. Leland (1921)
- Architectural style: Colonial
- MPS: First Period Buildings of Eastern Massachusetts TR
- NRHP reference No.: 90000196
- Added to NRHP: March 9, 1990

The Samuel Corning House is a historic First Period house in Beverly, Massachusetts. It is a 2.5-story five-bay house with a central chimney that was apparently built in stages, and is also notable for early 20th century preservation actions. The first portion, to the right of the chimney, was built c. 1700 as a typical First Period two story single cell structure. Around 1720 the left side was built, and a leanto section was added to the back at a somewhat later date.

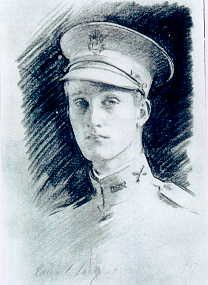
John Singer Sargent (1856–1925). Quincy Adams Shaw McKean, 1917

The house was purchased in 1920 by Quincy Adams Shaw McKean and Margarett Sargent, who made it the centerpiece of Colonial Revival complex they built on their 54-acre (22 ha) estate, which they named "Pride's Hill". Their architect, Joseph D. Leland of Boston, expanded the house with a group of vernacular wings to the north and east of the original. The first addition, a studio for Margarett Sargent, was built in 1921, with further additions continuing for much of the decade. Leland's work on the estate was the subject of a feature article in Architectural Record in 1926.

The house was listed on the National Register of Historic Places in 1990. It is now a condominium complex, still known as Pride's Hill.

== See also ==
- National Register of Historic Places listings in Essex County, Massachusetts
