= 1976 US Indoor Championships =

- Date: September 13–19
- Edition: 68th
- Category: 1976 WTA Tour
- Draw: 56S / 16D
- Prize money: $75,000
- Surface: Carpet / indoor
- Location: Atlanta, Georgia, U.S.
- Venue: The Omni

Champions

Singles
- (United Kingdom) Virginia Wade

Doubles
- (United States) Rosie Casals / (France) Françoise Dürr
← 1975 ·	U.S. Women's Indoor Championships	· 1978 →

The 1976 US Indoor Championships was a women's singles tennis tournament played on indoor carpet courts at the Omni in Atlanta, Georgia in the United States. The event was part of the 1976 Colgate Series. It was the 68th edition of the tournament and was held from September 13 through September 19, 1976. Second-seeded Virginia Wade won the singles title and earned $14,000 first-prize money.

== Winners ==
=== Singles ===
(United Kingdom) Virginia Wade defeated (Netherlands) Betty Stöve 5–7, 7–5, 7–5

=== Doubles ===
(United States) Rosie Casals / (France) Françoise Dürr defeated (Netherlands) Betty Stöve / (United Kingdom) Virginia Wade 6–0, 6–4

== Prize money ==
Event	W	F	SF	QF	Round of 16	Round of 32	Round of 64
Singles	$14,000	$7,000	$3,375	$1,600	$900	$500	$350

== See also ==
- 1976 U.S. National Indoor Open Championships – men's tournament
