= 1979 U.S. National Indoor Championships =

- Date: February 26 – March 4
- Edition: 10th
- Category: Grand Prix
- Draw: 48S / 24D
- Prize money: $250,000
- Surface: Carpet / indoor
- Location: Memphis, TN, United States
- Venue: Racquet Club of Memphis

Champions

Singles
- (United States) Jimmy Connors

Doubles
- (Netherlands) Tom Okker / (Poland) Wojciech Fibak
- U.S. National Indoor Championships

The 1979 U.S. National Indoor Championships was a men's tennis tournament played on indoor carpet courts at the Racquet Club of Memphis in Memphis, Tennessee in the United States. The event was part of the 1979 Colgate-Palmolive Grand Prix circuit. It was the tenth edition of the tournament in the open era and was held from February 26 through March 4, 1979. First-seeded Jimmy Connors won the singles title and $40,000 first-prize money. It was his fifth singles title at the event after 1973–75 and 1978 which equaled the tournament record set by Wylie C. Grant. (Note: Grant won the singles title in 1903–4, 1906, 1908 and 1912.)

== Finals ==
=== Singles ===
(United States) Jimmy Connors defeated (United States) Arthur Ashe 6–4, 5–7, 6–3

- It was Connors' 3rd singles title of the year and the 74th of his career.

=== Doubles ===
(Netherlands) Tom Okker / (Poland) Wojciech Fibak defeated (South Africa) Frew McMillan / (United States) Dick Stockton 6–4, 6–4

== See also ==
- 1979 US Indoor Championships – women's tournament
