= Katherine Winthrop McKean =

American tennis player (1914–1997)

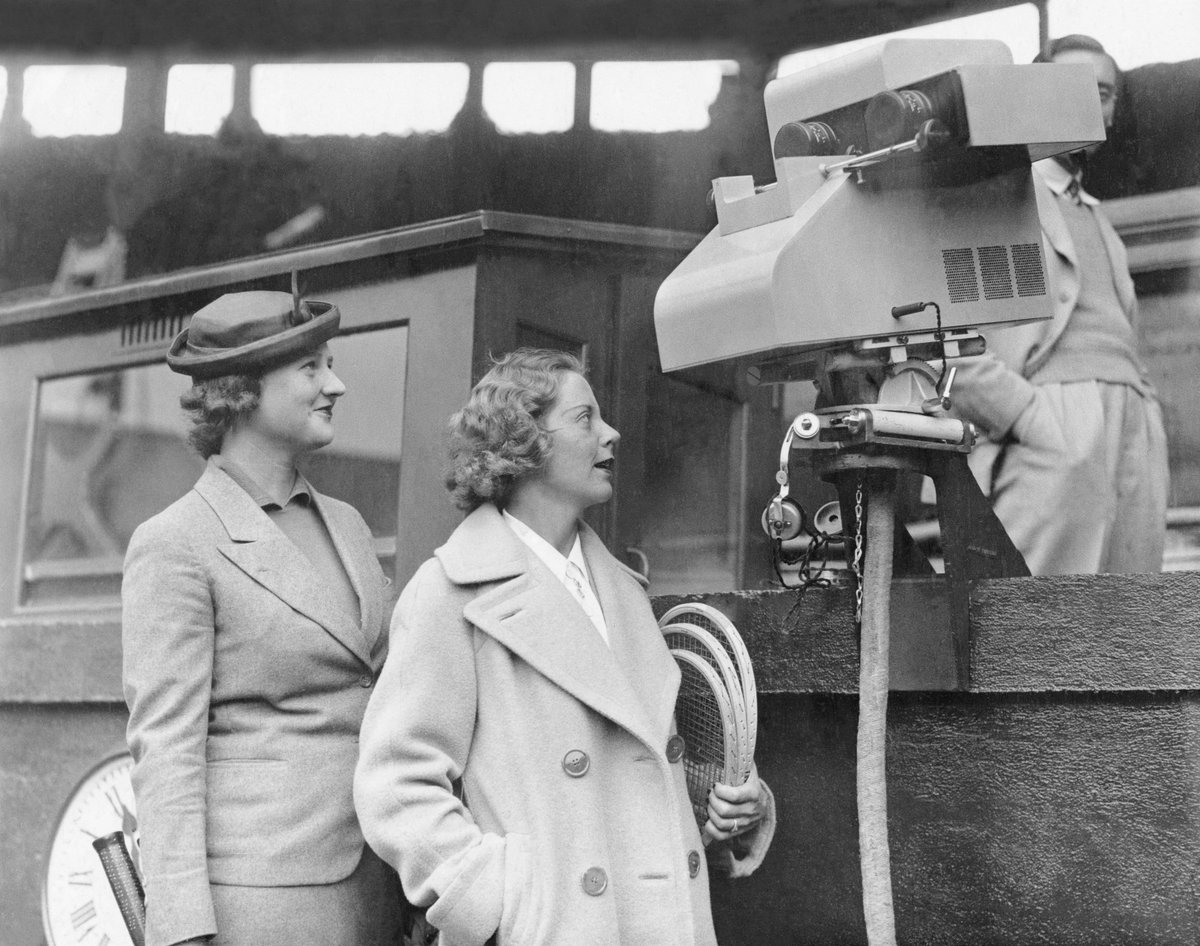
Katharine (Kay) Winthrop (left) and Alice Marble at Wimbledon in 1937

Katherine or Kathrine "Kay" Winthrop McKean (July 17, 1914 – February 12, 1997) was a top-ranked American tennis player, who, in 1936 at Wimbledon, played doubles with Alice Marble. She was active from 1931 to 1957.

== Early life and family ==
Kay Winthrop was born in Ipswich, Massachusetts on July 17, 1914. She was one of six children born to Frederic Bayard Winthrop (1868–1932) and Sarah Barroll Thayer (1885–1938). Her siblings included Robert Winthrop; Dorothy Winthrop; Frederic Bayard Winthrop, Jr; John Winthrop; Nathaniel Thayer Winthrop.

Through her father, she was a direct descendant of John Winthrop: the descendant line is Gov. John Winthrop, Gov. John Winthrop II, Magistrate Wait Still Winthrop, John F. R. S Winthrop, John Still Winthrop, Francis Bayard Winthrop, Thomas Charles Winthrop, Robert Winthrop, Frederic Bayard Winthrop. Her maternal grandfather was banker and railroad executive, Nathaniel Thayer III and through him, she was descended from the Van Rensselaer, Schuyler and Thayer families.

In 1932, Winthrop attended Foxcroft School.

== Career ==
Kay Winthrop entered U.S. Championships tournament every year from 1931 to 1947. She interrupted in 1948 since she was pregnant, and returned in 1952.

Winthrop entered Wimbledon in 1937, playing doubles with Alice Marble, and 1946. Before World War II she was in tour in South America with Jack Kramer, Sarah Palfrey and Bobby Riggs.

Her titles are 1944 US Indoors, and runner-up in 1938, 1943, and 1945. She was number 9 in the US Rankings in 1936 and 1939. Winthrop won four national titles in the junior girls' tennis tournament, and five national titles in the women's league, in indoors both singles and doubles.

Winthrop gave up competitive tennis in 1970, aged 56, but continued to play socially for many years later.

== Personal life ==
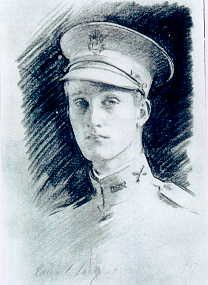
Quincy Adams Shaw McKean, 1917, by John Singer Sargent (1856–1925)

On November 21, 1947, Winthrop married Quincy Adams Shaw McKean (1891–1971). They met at a cocktail party while McKean was still married to his first wife, painter Margarett Sargent (1892–1978). McKean had bought the Samuel Corning House in Beverly, Massachusetts in 1920 (which was listed on the National Register of Historic Places in 1990).

Together, Kay and Shaw had five children: the first being John McKean, born on August 7, 1948, the last being David McKean, born in 1956. In 1988 David married Kathleen Mary Kaye, daughter of Charles Forbes Kaye. On March 14, 2016, David McKean was sworn in as the U.S. Ambassador to Luxembourg.

Kay Winthrop McKean died on February 12, 1997, in Hamilton, Massachusetts.

=== Honors ===
In 1990, Kay Winthrop was inducted into the New England Tennis Hall of Fame.

== US Indoor Championships ==
=== Singles ===
Year	Champion	Runner-up	Score
1938	Virginia Hollinger	Katherine Winthrop McKean 1/3	6–1, 2–6, 6–3
1943	Pauline Betz 3/4	Katherine Winthrop McKean 2/3	6–4, 6–1
1944	Katherine Winthrop McKean	Helen Pedersen Rihbany 3/3	6–0, 7–5
1945	Helen Pedersen Rihbany 1/2	Katherine Winthrop McKean 3/3	4–6, 6–2, 6–3

=== Doubles ===
Year	Champions	Runners-up	Score
1938	Virginia Rice Johnson 1/4; Katherine Winthrop McKean 1/4	Norma Taubele Barber 4/5; Grace Surber	4–6, 6–4, 6–4
1941	Pauline Betz 1/2; Dorothy Bundy Cheney	Hazel Hotchkiss Wightman 4/5; Katherine Winthrop McKean 1/2	6–4, 6–3
1942	Virginia Rice Johnson 2/4; Katherine Winthrop McKean 2/4	Mrs. Philip Theopold; Virginia Ellis	6–2, 6–0
1944	Virginia Rice Johnson 3/4; Katherine Winthrop McKean 3/4	Norma Taubele Barber 5/5; Mary Jane Donnalley	3–6, 8–6, 6–0
1945	Virginia Rice Johnson 4/4; Katherine Winthrop McKean 4/4	Helen Pedersen Rihbany 1/4; Betty Grimes Stokum	6–4, 7–5
1947	Doris Hart 1/2; Barbara Scofield Davidson 1/3	Helen Pedersen Rihbany 2/4; Katherine Winthrop McKean 2/2	6–1, 6–1
