= Midwifery in the Middle Ages =

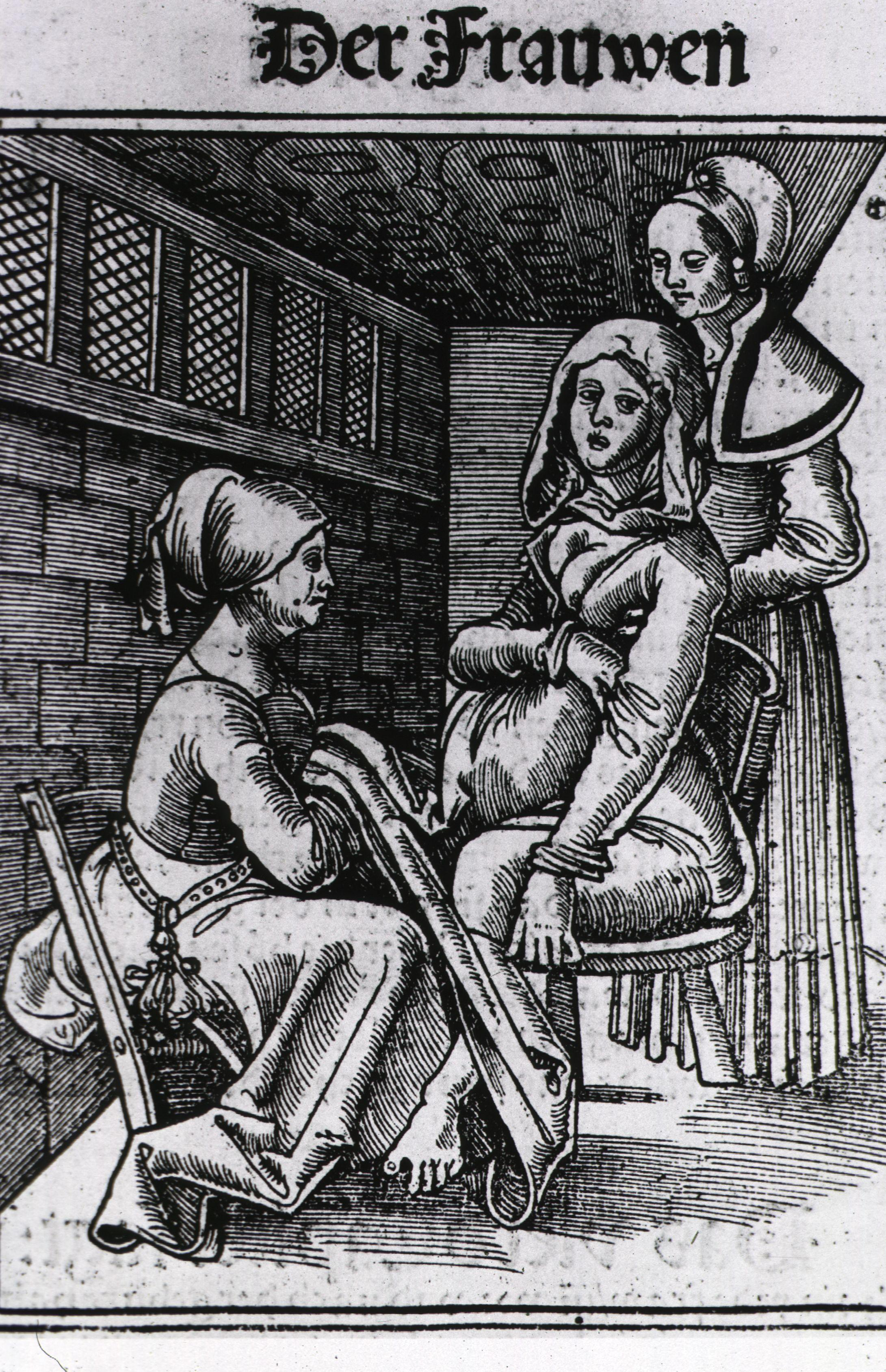
Two midwives assist a woman during childbirth.

Midwifery in the Middle Ages was a significant piece of women's work and health prior to the professionalization of medicine. During the Middle Ages in Western Europe, people relied on the medical knowledge of Roman and Greek philosophers, specifically Galen, Hippocrates, and Aristotle. These medical philosophers focused primarily on the health of men, and women's health issues were understudied. This lack of research led to the general assumption that women's health should be handled by women, especially concerning pregnancy. An additional opposition to men's involvement in childbearing was that men should not associate with female genitalia throughout the secret practices of childbearing. Thus, male physicians rarely interfered with the pregnant patients or the birthing process, unless something had gone unexpectedly wrong. The prevalence of this mindset allowed women to continue the practice of midwifery throughout most of the medieval era with seemingly little male interference. However, it is likely that the control of men over women's births and reproductive affairs, was always conditional. Moving out of the middle ages and into a world of medical licensing and preference toward formally trained physicians, midwives would fade into obscurity for quite some time.

== Background ==
It is suggested that most midwives came from the lower classes and were illiterate. This is likely because midwives typically did not need to be literate to practice their trade, indicating that there was no apparent need for formal training. During the late Middle Ages a few books were written for teaching midwifery for both women and men. Prior to this point, midwife manuals contained outdated information and were written by individuals who studied medical theory without physician influence.

Midwives learned their craft from other women within their communities and from their own childbearing experiences. This pattern of oral and practical education meant midwives often taught upcoming midwives through hands-on experiences. From the time they were small girls, prospective midwives were present at the births of their siblings or neighbors and they observed the birthing process performed by the midwife or other female family members. Commonly the midwife's tools included scissors, linens, trays, baskets, and a birthing stool. Men were generally not allowed to view this birthing process. The record of a fifteenth-century fine by Belgian historian Louis Théo Maes states that: "One Henne Vanden Damme, for having hid behind a staircase to eavesdrop upon his wife, she being in labour of childbirth, which thing doth not befit a man, for the said eavesdropping was fined 15 livres."

== Origin of midwifery ==
While there is a significant lack of historical evidence for midwives before the 13th century, this practice has likely been occurring in some capacity since the emergence of humanity. Keeping this in mind, this practice was already well established by the middle ages. Alongside midwives, there were a variety of other women medical practitioners that are often incorrectly referred to as midwives. These women (barbers, surgeons, apothecaries, etc.) were typically married to men of the same practice, or learned their trade outside of Europe. However, midwifery seems to be one of the areas in medieval medicine where women had a significant amount of control, and thus it was largely dominated by women.

Much of this trend can be blamed on the idea that women's health, specifically women's reproductive health, was viewed as something better handled by women for their personal knowledge. There is also some evidence that suggests this idea could have extended to other areas of healthcare, meaning that female surgeons or barbers were preferred for the treatment of women. This could additionally explain why it seems that women practitioners so infrequently treated men. However, there is evidence that men did frequently treat women, especially in matters outside of childbearing, and there is even evidence of women occasionally treating men.

== Role of the midwife ==
Midwives were involved with births from all social classes to various degrees. The poorest women were typically helped by the women in their family and their neighbors rather than the midwives from the towns. In towns, government compensated midwives with "tax exempt status or a small pension" for their service within the community. This compensation placed a lot of emphasis on a midwife's reputation. Beginning in the early fourteenth century, town officials started recording some midwife activities in municipal account books; for example, a 1312 record from Bruges states "Communal expenses – Item, by Copp. Voers. Two midwives who were called to see a newborn infant found in front of the city walls on Christmas Eve, 20 solidi." In more exceptional situations, if the midwife had a much respected reputation, they may also serve as court midwife. This involvement included working for individuals like the French queen.

== Regulations on the practice of midwifery ==
Unlike male medical practitioners, midwives did not frequently participate in guilds or attempt to organize themselves, which left them particularly vulnerable when medical licensing became standard practice. Medical licensure originated around the mid-fifteenth century. Typically the church or legislature mandated these requirements, and the earliest known example is from Regensburg in 1452. This organization of midwives commenced once a medical "hierarchy" was constructed "with male doctors at the top." Lawmakers hoped that regulation would improve the quality of care given by midwives.

Regulation of midwifery was also an ecclesiastical concern; during the fourteenth century, midwives were instructed on how to properly baptize newborns. Church members wanted to ensure that midwives understood the process of baptism and the sacrament of baptism. Such ecclesiastical and secular regulatory introductions, harmed midwives role and reputation within society. This could have led to decreasing employment rates for women during the Middle Ages. Such developments forced many midwives out of the craft and this would have lasting effects.

Because of the lack of organization of midwives in their trade, these developments were detrimental as medical licensing became more strict. While this lack of licensing wasn't as serious in the early middle ages, as time progressed the public would become more keen on their caregivers being licensed. Many of the institutions that would certify practitioners did not accept women, and thus they were much less likely to be licensed. When these women weren't able to be licensed, the only "trustworthy" care available shifted to licensed men. This led to the medical field being largely dominated by men, and the one profession that women had maintained a significant grasp on would become less and less common. In recent years however, it seems the desire for midwives to attend births is on a general incline.

== Medieval midwives of note ==
Only a handful of medieval midwives have been identified for whom we have anything more than a name. One woman, Bourgot L'Obliere worked for the French queen as a midwife. This involvement with the queen was resultant of her outstanding reputation as a successful individual in her trade. Another, named Asseline Alexandre, attended the births of the Duchess of Burgundy in the 1370s. In addition to these notable midwives, several women were identified in English poll tax records from the later 14th century. These women included Matilda Kembere and Marg[ery?] Josy in Reading and Felicia Tracy in Canterbury.

Although often referred to as a midwife, the 12th-century Salernitan medical writer Trota of Salerno was rather a general medical practitioner. She specialized in women's conditions, described postpartum repairs, and seems to have seen the supervision of normal birth as the province of others. Her contributions to the Trotula display the most notable of her impacts in the field of gynecology.

The practice of licensing midwives in northern cities of Europe originated in the 14th century, but no extant written licenses from this period have yet been identified. Rather, much of what we know of individual midwives comes from legal records and court proceedings. For example, we know of the Muslim midwives Blanca and Xenci who were brought from Toledo to serve at the court of King Carlos III of Navarre (r. 1387-1425). Additionally, a mother and daughter “dynasty” of Muslim midwives, doña Fatima and doña Haxa, who attended the births of, Catalina, the queen of Castille, and Blanca, daughter of Carlos of Navarre and herself queen of Navarre by 1425. In late 15th- and early 16th-century Brie (a suburb of Paris), midwives can be found using the ecclesiastical courts to secure or confirm their professional advantages. In one instance, we learned of the midwife Isabelle Rougemaille who brought suit in 1500/1501 against a potential client because that woman had allowed another birth attendant to assist her in a recent delivery. Although midwives were occasionally chastened for such offenses as baptizing fetuses that seem to have been born dead (likely because of Christian parental concerns for the child's immortal soul), thus far the only known case of a midwife being prosecuted for the death of a woman under her care is the 1403 trial of a Jewish midwife in the French city of Marseille, Floreta d'Ays. That case involves a level of anti-Semitism otherwise undocumented in Marseille in this period.

== Questions of witchcraft ==
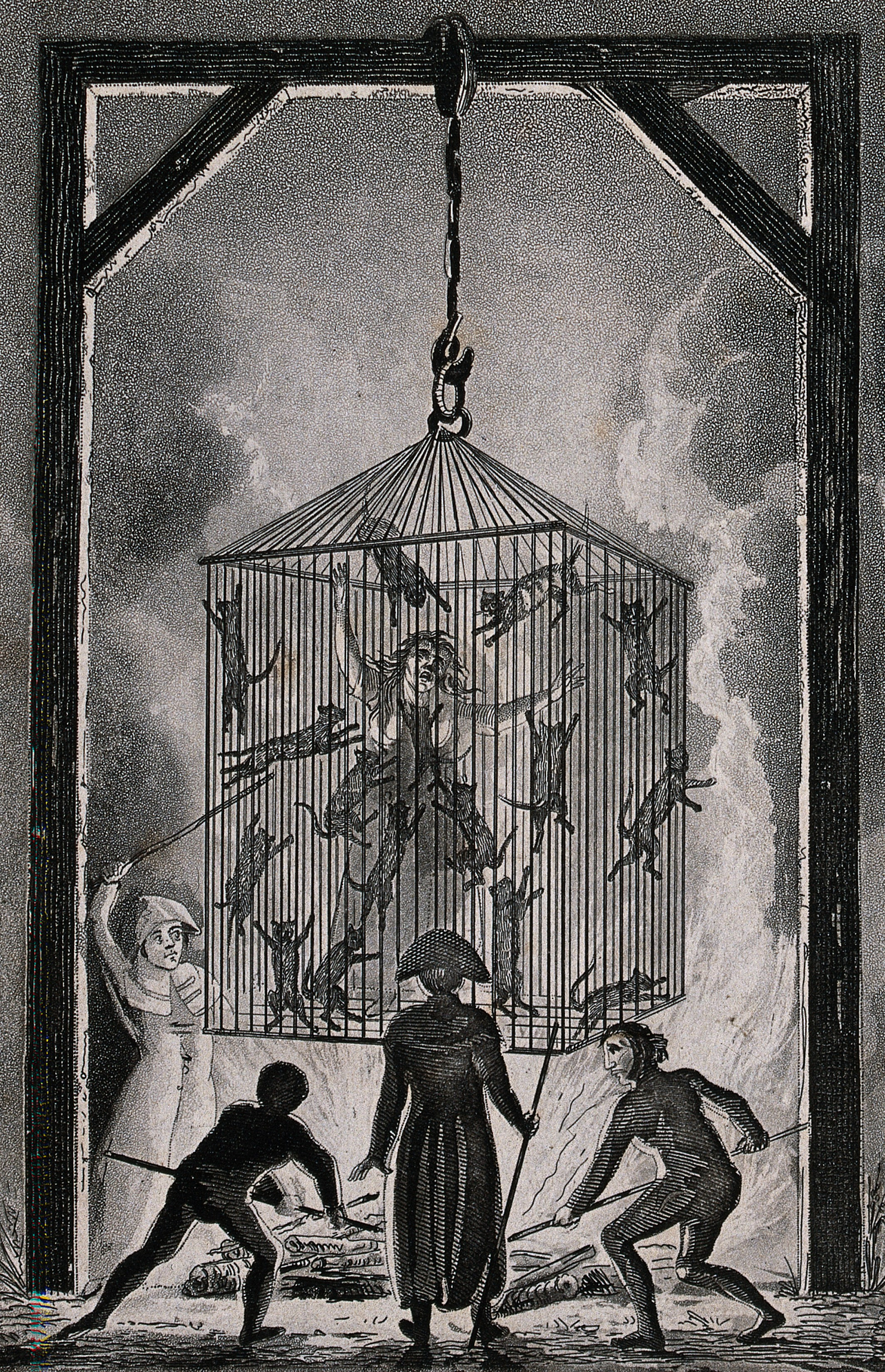
The burning of Louisa Mabree, a French midwife

Regulations on the practice of midwifery and the early witch trials occurred during the same time period that allegations of witchcraft occurred. This correlation continues to cause debate surrounding the connection between midwifery and the witch trials. Several historians have discussed these connections between "witchcraft and midwives."

On one side of this debate, historians argue that Western European countries feared the knowledge of midwives and equated this to the practice of witchcraft. During this time, the church and state imposed restrictions on midwives, and required that midwives were supervised. Supervisors guaranteed that midwives followed their religious oath against the practice of witchcraft. Its suggested that midwives were commonly tried for witchcraft because of their medicinal knowledge. If natural remedies, unknown to the general public, were used, midwives were questioned about their associations with witchcraft.

However, many historians suggest that midwives only accounted for a fraction of the women accused of witchcraft in this time period. Additionally, scholars note that even though some midwives were tried for witchcraft, the witch trials encompassed many groups of people. This is emphasized by the importance of not equating midwives to the more general "wise women". This suggests that several severe cases create the stereotype that midwives made up the majority of the witch trials.
