= Birthing chair =

Device to hold a woman in upright posture during childbirth

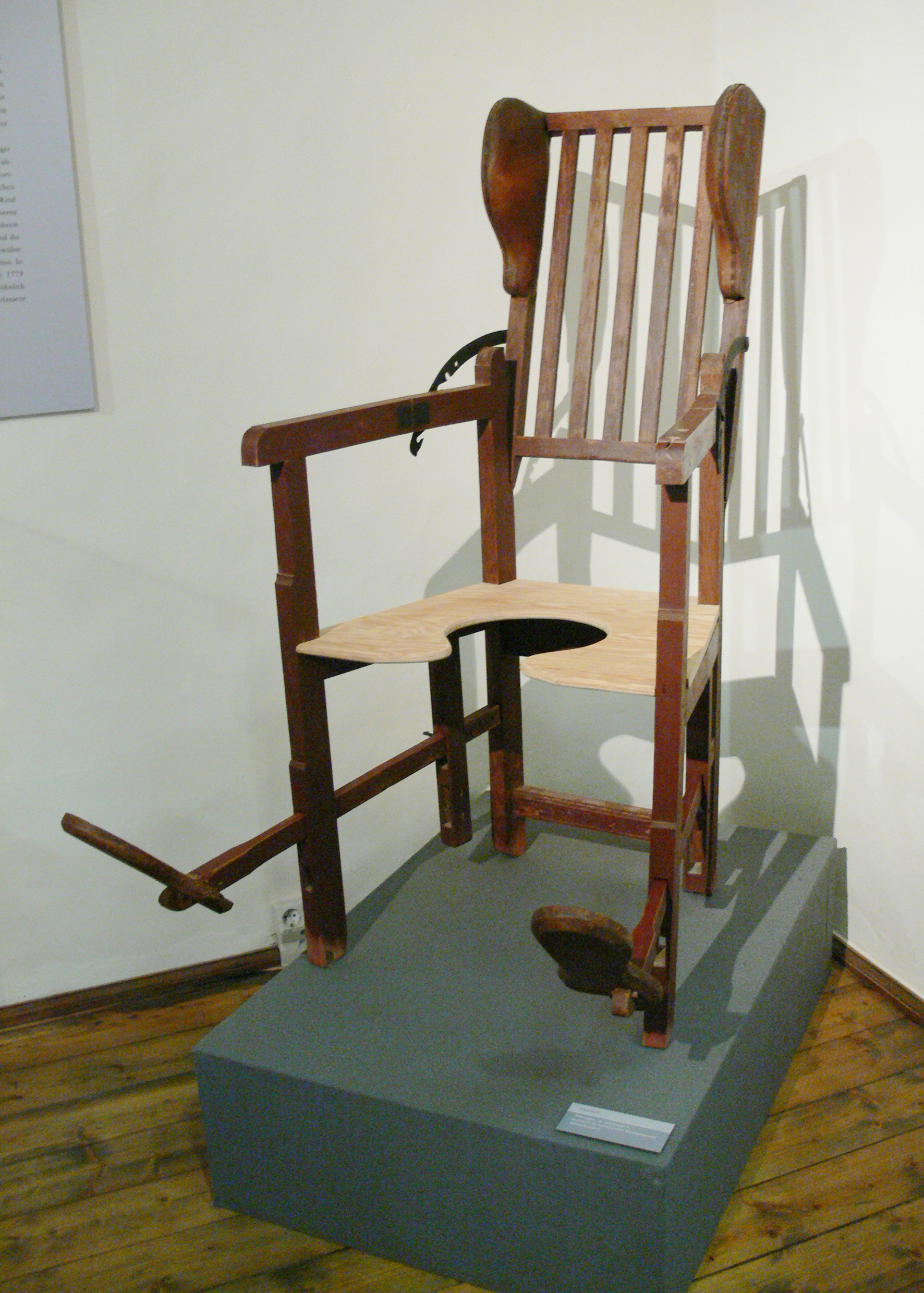
Birthing chair with foot placements

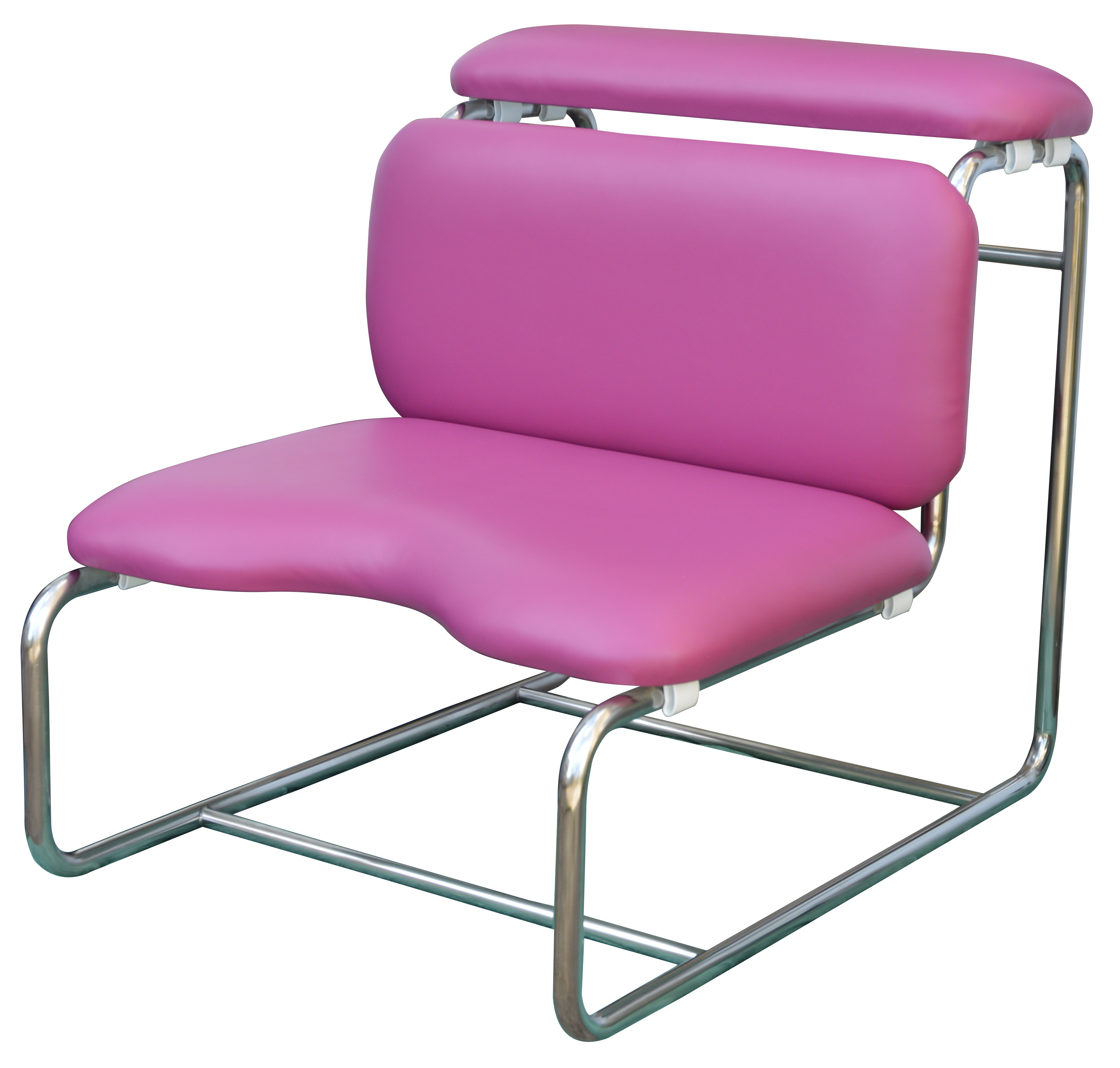
Modern Birthing Chair (Adjustable)

A birthing chair, also known as a birth chair, is a device that is shaped to assist a woman in the physiological upright posture during childbirth. It is intended to provide balance and support. If backless, it is known as a birth stool.

The early birthing chairs varied between having three or four legs, though three legged birthing chairs are most commonly seen. Both styles support the bottom of the women in labor and often have a slender, sloped back for comfort and to allow birthing assistants, who are positioned behind the mother in labor, to massage or support her. Often the arms of the chair have hand holds or arm rests for the mother to grip, providing extra leverage. Birthing chairs are usually 8 to 10 inches (20.32 centimeters- 25.4 centimeters) off the ground specifically to allow laboring women to brace their feet against the ground to help in pushing.

== History ==
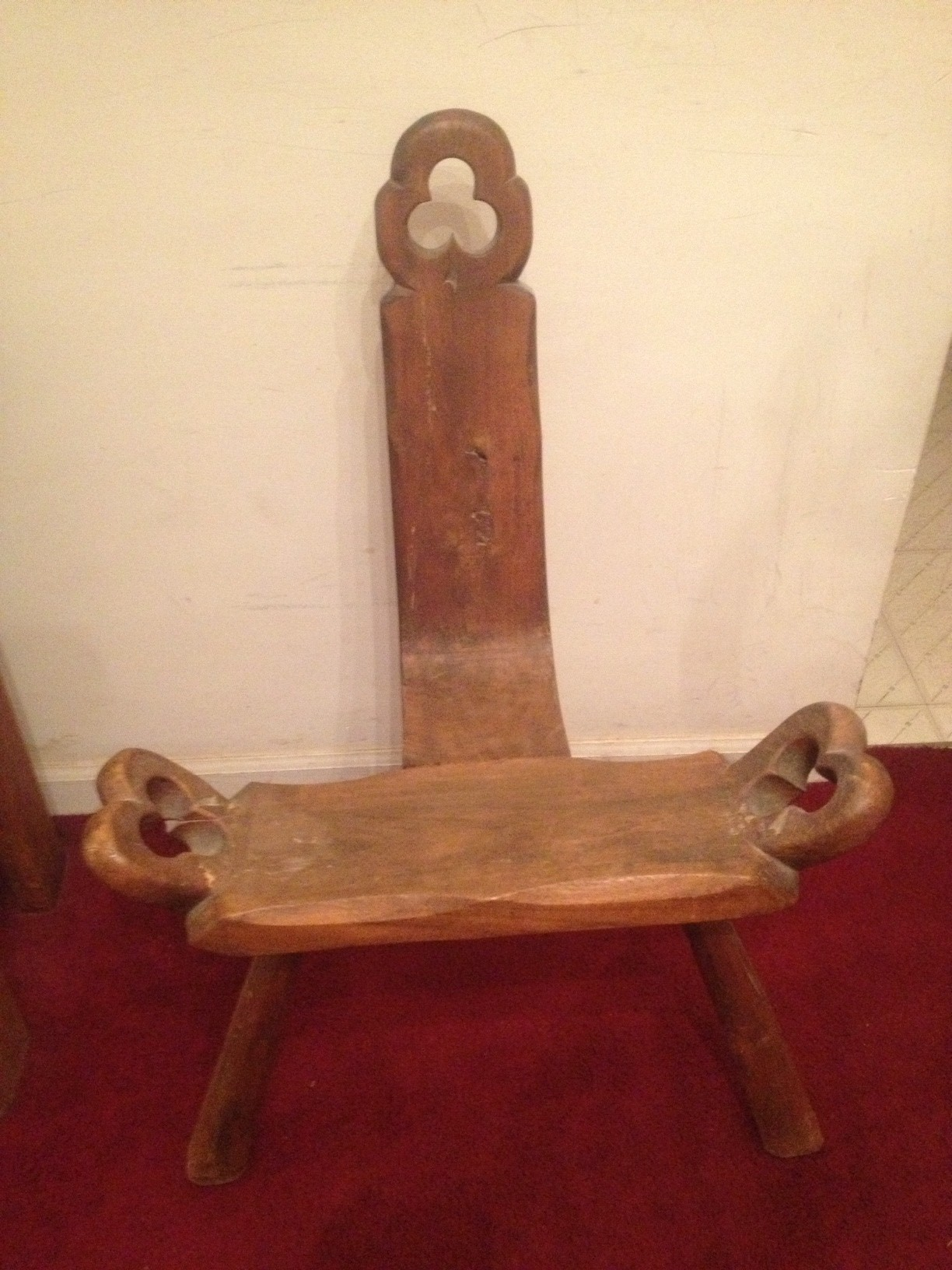
Birthing chair

The birthing chair has been used for millennia, appearing for example in Exodus 1:16: And he said, 'When ye do the office of a midwife to the Hebrew women and see them upon the birthstool. Birthing chairs took the place of laboring mothers sitting on birth attendant's laps, as it was the previous practice. These chairs were used before male physicians dominated the delivery room. The use of birthing chairs or similar devices has been seen around the globe, not isolated to a particular region. Women giving birth in the upright position have been depicted in Asian, African, Pacific Islander, and Native American art. The birthing chair can be traced to Egypt in the year 1450 B.C.E. Pictured on the walls of The Birth House at Luxor, Egypt, is an Egyptian queen giving birth on a stool. It can also be traced to Greece in 200 B.C as it is featured on an ancient Grecian sculpted votive. Celtic items from 100 B.C.E in Britain also depict women sitting in the same upright position as if in a birthing chair. The first depiction in a woodcut from the 16thc shows a woman sitting on a stool and surrounded by other women. The three legged birth stool, sometimes called a groaning stool, was designed to be carried disassembled, and sits low to the ground. Some examples, such as this continental birthing chair, are adjustable with the back extending so the woman could move from an upright position to a reclined position.

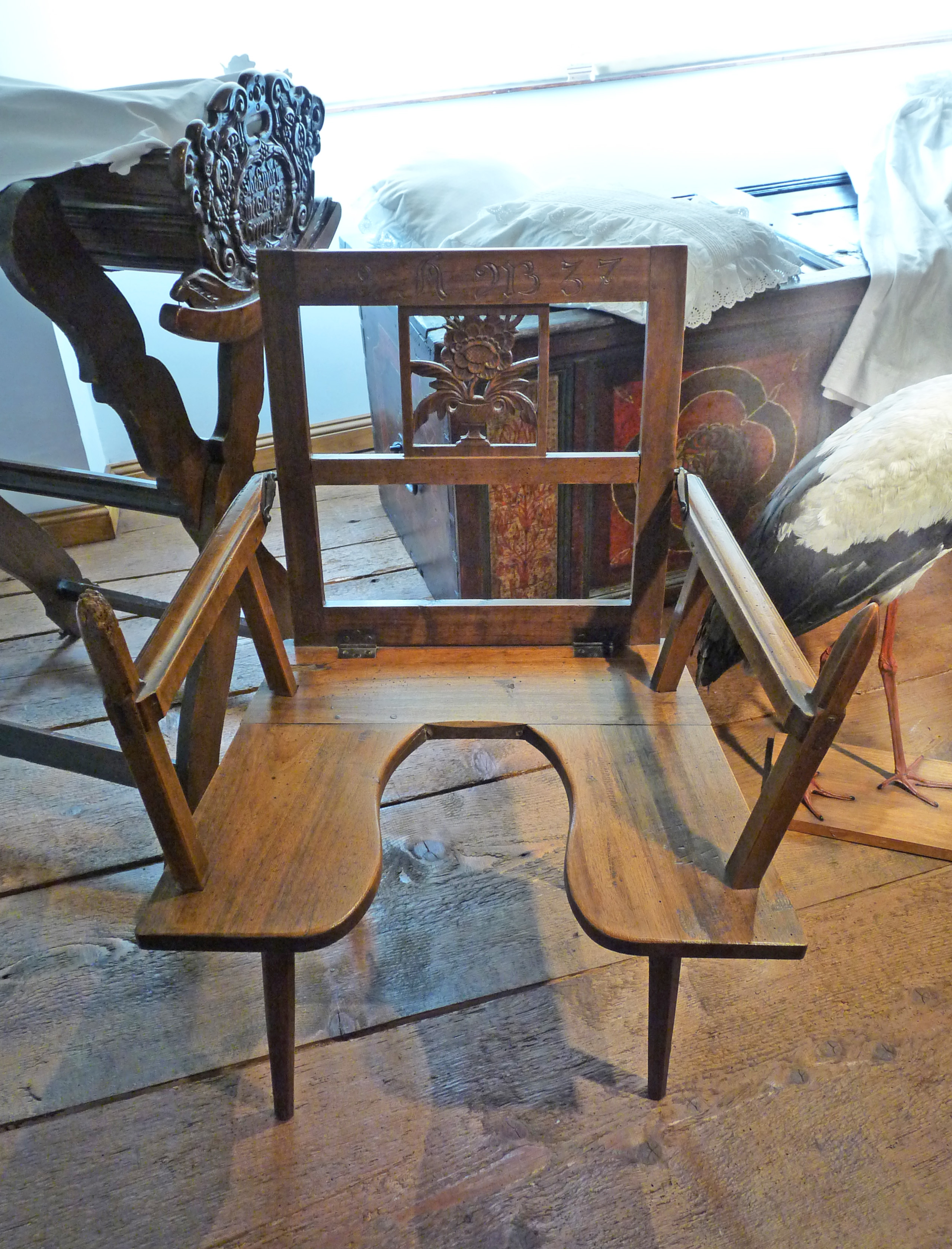
Wooden birthing chair

Birthing chairs fell out of use after physicians began using the flat bed for women to lie on during delivery. The concept of the birthing chair has also been described in observations by anthropologist as well as missionaries.

== In modern times ==
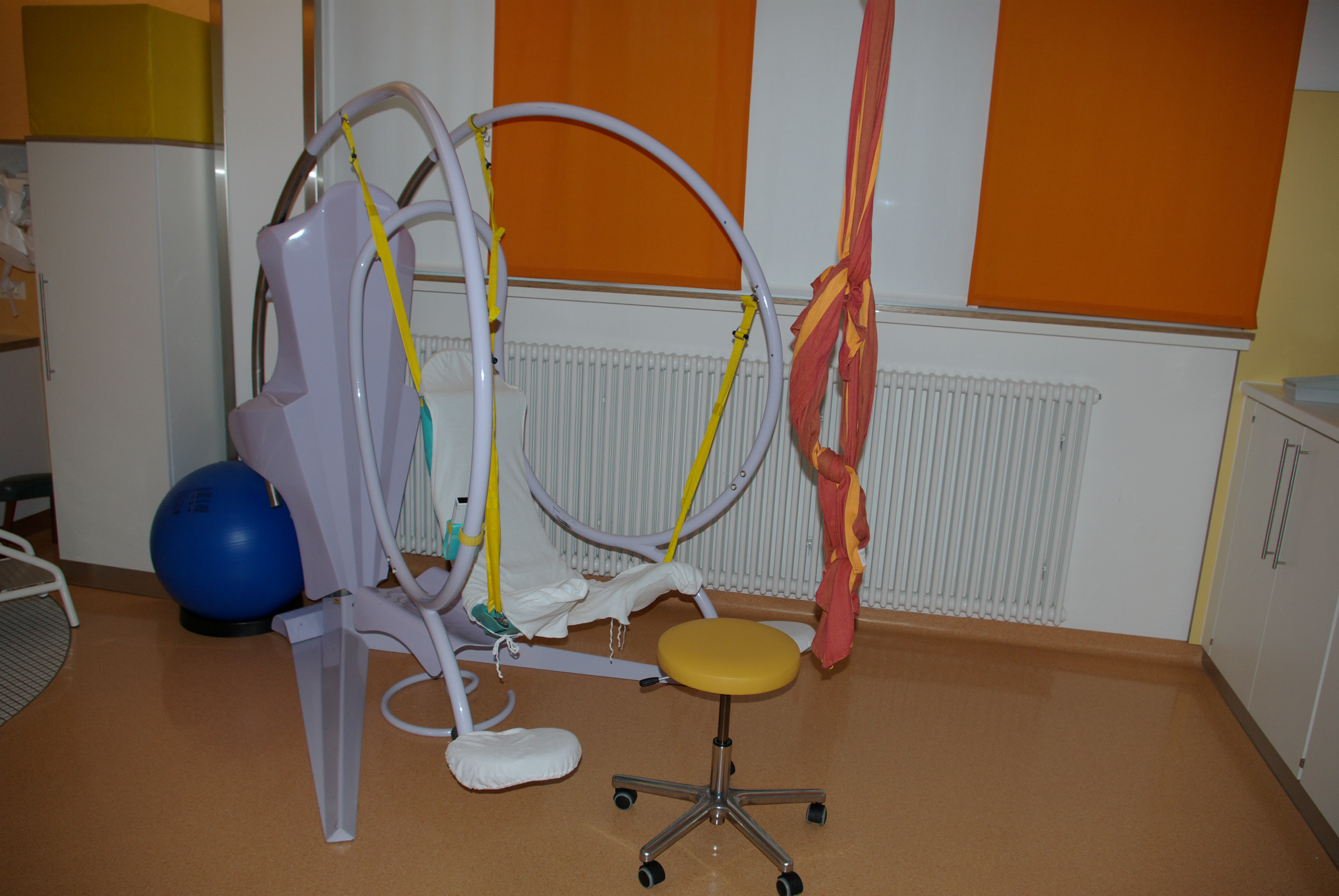
Modern birthing chair

Modern birthing chair commonly seen.

As of the 1980s the birthing chair has been making a comeback in the modern medicine of childbirth. Some expecting mothers have reverted to the birthing chair for its upright position because it allows gravity to assist in the expulsion of the baby, and a position ''upright but more or less immobile". Studies have shown that the birthing chair speeds up the time of delivery and increases comfort for expecting mothers. The position of the birthing chair allows muscles (including vaginal and abdominal as well as those in the back, stomach, legs, and arms) used in childbirth to work to efficiency. Since the 1980s many hospitals have begun installing birthing chairs due to the large number of enquiries about them.

A modern birthing chair/stool can be made of many different materials including PVC inflatables such as the CUB support, plastic such as the Kaya stool and padded wooden stools. More recently birthing chairs/stools have been made to accommodate several upright positions such as squatting, all fours, kneeling and sitting, and are used as supports not necessarily as chairs or stools. Research suggests that being upright during labour can have many positive benefits for mother and baby. Using a modern-day birthing chair/stool/support during the first stage of labour can aid a woman in having an upright birth.

== See also ==
- Midwifery
- Obstetrics § History

== Web-link ==
Line 1 from 1.1 to 1.10 photographs show mother alone on birth-chair (with bowl beneath seat opening to catch amniotic fluid) and with support from partner respectively and photograph 5.5 shows a wooden birthing chair with foot supports.
