= U.S. Women's Indoor Championships =

U.S. Women's Indoor Tennis Championships

Defunct tennis tournament
- Founded: 1907
- Abolished: 2001
- Editions: 78
- Location: various United States
- Surface: Wood / indoor Hard / indoor

The U.S. Women's Indoor Championships, was a national tennis championship for women that was sanctioned by the United States Tennis Association and held 79 times from 1907 through 2001 at various locations and on various surfaces. The event was affiliated with the WTA Tour from 1971 through 2001 (excluding 1977).

Marie Wagner won more singles titles (6) and Hazel Hotchkiss Wightman won more doubles titles (10) at this tournament than any other woman. Lois Felix holds the record for runners-up in singles (4) while Wightman and Norma Taubele Barber hold the record for runners-up in doubles (5).

The women's tournament started in 1907 when they joined the men at the Seventh Regiment Armory in New York to form a combined tournament. Elisabeth Moore won the first title. The women's doubles event was added in 1908. The women played periods in New York (1907–1920, 1934–1940, and 1947–1953) and Longwood Courts at Chestnut Hill in Massachusetts (1921–1933, 1941–1946, 1954–1966). From 1967 to 1972 the women played in Winchester. In 1969 and 1970 the tournament remained an amateur event, meaning that players who had turned professional during these years were not allowed to compete. In 2002 the women rejoined the men in Memphis and in 2012 Memphis announced that it was renaming (restoring) the tournament to U.S. National Indoor Tennis Championships.

In 2002, a women's WTA Tour event in Oklahoma City was purchased and moved to Memphis; this event was renamed The Cellular South Cup. As Cellular South ended sponsoring the tournament after 2011, the event was renamed Memphis International.

== Locations ==
- 1907–20: New York
- 1921–1933: Chestnut Hill
- 1934–41: New York
- 1942–1966: Chestnut Hill
- 1967–71: Winchester
- 1973: Hingham
- 1974: New York
- 1975: Boston
- 1976: Atlanta
- 1978–81: Minneapolis
- 1982: Philadelphia
- 1983: Hartford, Connecticut
- 1984: East Hanover
- 1985-86: Princeton
- 1987: Piscataway Township
- 2001: Oklahoma City

== Finals ==
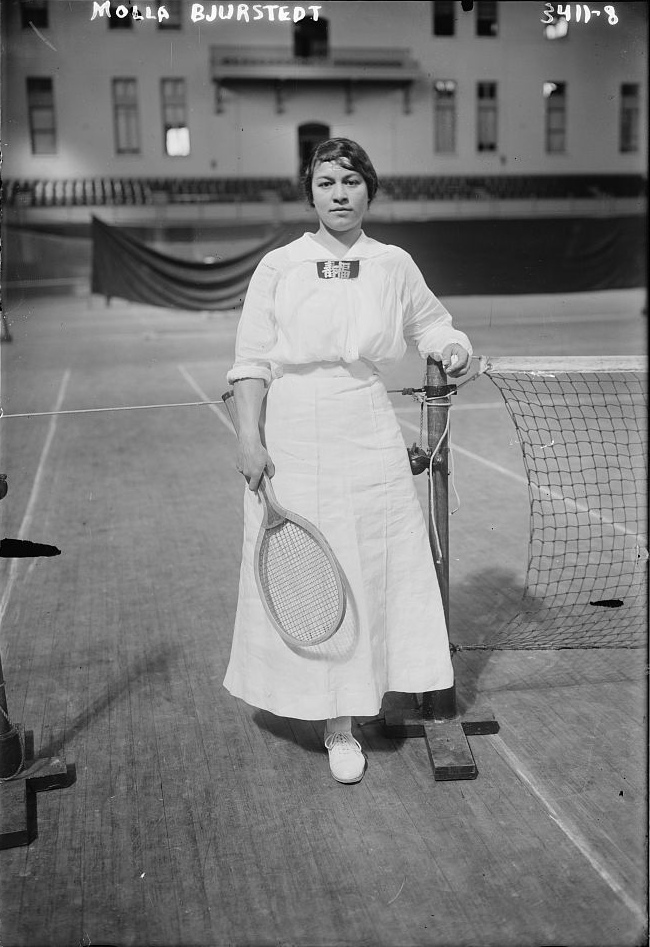
Molla Bjurstedt at the 1915 National Indoor Tennis Tournament at the Seventh Regiment Armory, New York City.

=== Singles ===
Year	Champion	Runner-up	Score
1907	(United States) Elisabeth Moore	(United States) Marie Wagner	6–2, 4–6, 6–2
1908	(United States) Marie Wagner 1/6	(United Kingdom) Nora Meyer Schmitz	6–3, 6–2
1909	(United States) Marie Wagner 2/6	(United States) Elisabeth Moore	6–0, 12–14, 6–0
1910	(United Kingdom) Nora Meyer Schmitz	(United States) Erna Marcus	3–6, 8–6, 6–3
1911	(United States) Marie Wagner 3/6	(United Kingdom) Nora Meyer Schmitz	6–4, 7–9, 6–4
1912	Not held		
1913	(United States) Marie Wagner 4/6	(United States) Alice Day Beard	6–1, 6–1
1914	(United States) Marie Wagner 5/6	(United States) Alice Day Beard	6–1, 2–6, 6–2
1915	(Norway) Molla Bjurstedt 1/5	(United States) Marie Wagner	6–4, 6–4
1916	(Norway) Molla Bjurstedt2/5	(United Kingdom) Nora Meyer Schmitz	6–2, 6–1
1917	(United States) Marie Wagner 6/6	(United States) Eleanor Goss	6–3, 6–1
1918	(Norway) Molla Bjurstedt 3/5	(United States) Eleanor Goss	3–6, 6–1, 6–4
1919	(United States) Hazel Hotchkiss Wightman 1/2	(United States) Marion Zinderstein	2–6, 6–1, 6–4
1920	(United States) Helene Pollak Falk	(United States) Edith Sigourney	8–6, 6–2
1921	(United States) Molla Mallory 4/5	(United States) Ann Sheafe Cole	6–0, 6–2
1922	(United States) Molla Mallory 5/5	(United States) Leslie Bancroft	7–5, 6–1
1923	(United States) Ann Sheafe Cole	(United States) Leslie Bancroft	8–6, 6–2
1924	(United States) Marion Zinderstein Jessup 1/2	(United States) Lillian Scharman Hester	6–2, 6–3
1925	(United States) Marion Zinderstein Jessup 2/2	(United States) Anna Fuller Hubbard	6–3, 7–5
1926	(United States) Elizabeth Ryan	(United States) Marion Zinderstein Jessup	1–6, 6–2, 6–3
1927	(United States) Hazel Hotchkiss Wightman 2/2	(United States) Margaret Blake	6–0, 2–6, 6–3
1928	(United States) Edith Sigourney	(United States) Anna Fuller Hubbard	4–6, 6–3, 6–1
1929	(United States) Margaret Blake	(United States) Anna Fuller Hubbard	6–3, 6–3
1930	(United States) Mianne Palfrey	(United States) Marion Zinderstein Jessup	7–5, 6–2
1931	(United States) Marjorie Sachs Pickhardt	(United States) Sarah Palfrey Cooke	6–3, 9–7
1932	(United States) Marjorie Morrill	(United States) Marjorie Sachs Pickhardt	3–6, 6–2, 6–2
1933	(United States) Dorrance Chase Deston	(United States) Helen Germaine	6–3, 6–2
1934	(United States) Norma Taubele Barber	(United States) Helen Pedersen Rihbany	6–4, 6–1
1935	(United States) Jane Sharp	(United States) Helen Pedersen Rihbany	11–9, 6–1
1936	(United States) Marjorie Gladman Van Ryn	(United States) Norma Taubele Barber	6–4, 6–3
1937	(France) Sylvie Jung Henrotin	(United States) Millicent Hirsch Lang	10–8, 0–6, 6–2
1938	(United States) Virginia Hollinger	(United States) Katherine Winthrop	6–1, 2–6, 6–3
1939	(United States) Pauline Betz 1/4	(United States) Helen Bernhard	7–5, 4–6, 6–1
1940	(United States) Sarah Palfrey Cooke	(United States) Pauline Betz	6–4, 1–6, 7–5
1941	(United States) Pauline Betz 2/4	(United States) Dorothy Bundy Cheney	6–1, 10–12, 6–2
1942	(United States) Patricia Canning Todd 1/2	(United States) Hope Knowles Rawls	8–6, 1–6, 6–2
1943	(United States) Pauline Betz 3/4	(United States) Katherine Winthrop	6–4, 6–1
1944	(United States) Katherine Winthrop McKean	(United States) Helen Pedersen Rihbany	6–0, 7–5
1945	(United States) Helen Pedersen Rihbany 1/2	(United States) Katherine Winthrop	4–6, 6–2, 6–3
1946	(United States) Helen Pedersen Rihbany 2/2	(United States) Katharine Hubbell	7–5, 6–4
1947	(United States) Pauline Betz 4/4	(United States) Doris Hart	6–2, 7–5
1948	(United States) Patricia Canning Todd 2/2	(United States) Doris Hart	3–6, 6–3, 6–2
1949	(United States) Gussie Moran	(United States) Nancy Chaffee	6–2, 6–3
1950	(United States) Nancy Chaffee 1/3	(United States) Althea Gibson	6–0, 6–2
1951	(United States) Nancy Chaffee Kiner 2/3	(United States) Beverly Baker Fleitz	6–4, 6–4
1952	(United States) Nancy Chaffee Kiner 3/3	(United States) Patricia Canning Todd	6–1, 6–0
1953	(Australia) Thelma Coyne Long	(United States) Barbara Scofield Davidson	5–7, 6–0, 9–7
1954	(United States) Dorothy Watman Levine 1/2	(United States) Lois Felix	6–1, 6–1
1955	(United States) Katharine Hubbell	(United States) Mildred Thornton	8–6, 9–7
1956	(United States) Lois Felix 1/2	(United States) June Stack	9–7, 9–7
1957	(United States) Dorothy Watman Levine 2/2	(United States) Lois Felix	6–1, 6–1
1958	(United States) Nancy O'Connell	(United States) Bonnie Mencher	6–8, 6–3, 6–1
1959	(United States) Lois Felix 2/2	(United States) Carole Wright	6–2, 8–6
1960	(United States) Carole Wright 1/2	(United States) Lois Felix	6–1, 6–2
1961	(United States) Janet Hopps	(United States) Katharine Hubbell	6–0, 7–5
1962	(United States) Carole Wright 2/2	(United States) Lois Felix	6–4, 3–6, 6–3
1963	(United States) Carol Hanks Aucamp	(United States) Mary-Ann Eisel	6–2, 6–2
1964	(United States) Mary-Ann Eisel 1/3	(United States) Carole Wright	6–3, 6–4
1965	(United States) Nancy Richey	(United States) Carol Hanks Aucamp	6–3, 6–2
1966	(United States) Billie Jean King 1/5	(United States) Mary-Ann Eisel	6–0, 6–2
1967	(United States) Billie Jean King 2/5	(Netherlands) Trudy Groenman	6–1, 6–0
1968	(United States) Billie Jean King 3/5	(United States) Rosemary Casals	6–3, 9–7
1969	(United States) Mary-Ann Eisel 2/3	(United States) Stephanie DeFina	6–3, 4–6, 6–2
1970	(United States) Mary-Ann Eisel Curtis 3/3	(United States) Patti Hogan	0–6, 6–3, 6–4
1971	(United States) Billie Jean King 4/5	(United States) Rosemary Casals	4–6, 6–2, 6–3
1972	Not held		
1973	(Australia) Evonne Goolagong 1/2	(United Kingdom) Virginia Wade	6–4, 6–4
1974	(United States) Billie Jean King 5/5	(United States) Chris Evert	6–3, 3–6, 6–2
1975	(Czechoslovakia) Martina Navratilova 1/4	(Australia) Evonne Goolagong	6–2, 4–6, 6–3
1976	(United Kingdom) Virginia Wade	(Netherlands) Betty Stöve	5–7, 7–5, 7–5
1977	Not held		
1978	(United States) Chris Evert	(United Kingdom) Virginia Wade	6–7, 6–2, 6–4
1979	(Australia) Evonne Goolagong Cawley 2/2	(Australia) Dianne Fromholtz	6–3, 6–4
1980	(United States) Tracy Austin	(Australia) Dianne Fromholtz	6–1, 2–6, 6–2
1981	(United States) Martina Navratilova 2/4	(United States) Tracy Austin	6–0, 6–2
1982	(United States) Barbara Potter	(United States) Pam Shriver	6–4, 6–2
1983	(United States) Kim Shaefer	(West Germany) Sylvia Hanika	6–4, 6–3
1984	(United States) Martina Navratilova 3/4	(United States) Chris Evert	6–2, 7–6^{(7–4)}
1985	(Czechoslovakia) Hana Mandlíková	(Sweden) Catarina Lindqvist	6–3, 7–5
1986	(United States) Martina Navratilova 4/4	(Czechoslovakia) Helena Suková	3–6, 6–0, 7–6^{(7–5)}
1987	(Czechoslovakia) Helena Suková	(United States) Lori McNeil	6–0, 6–3
1988–2000	Not held		
2001	(United States) Monica Seles	(United States) Jennifer Capriati	6–3, 5–7, 6–2

=== Doubles ===
Year	Champions	Runners-up	Score
1908	(United States) Helen Pouch (United States) Elisabeth Moore 1/2	Mrs. A.H. McCarty; M. Johnson	13–11, 6–3
1909	(United States) Erna Marcus (United States) Elisabeth Moore 2/2	(United States) Marie Wagner (United States) Louise Hammond Raymond	3–6, 6–4, 12–10
1910	(United States) Marie Wagner 1/4 (United States) Clara Kutroff Cassebeer 1/2	(United States) Erna Marcus (United States) Elisabeth Moore	6–2, 5–7, 6–3
1911	Elizabeth Bunce (United States) Barbara Fleming	(United Kingdom) Nora Meyer Schmitz; Erna Marcus	6–4, 8–6
1912	Not held		
1913	(United States) Marie Wagner 2/4 (United States) Clara Kutroff Cassebeer 2/2	May Fish; Alice Fish	10–8, 6–2
1914	Emily Stokes Weaver 1/3 (United States) Clare Cassel	(United Kingdom) Nora Meyer Schmitz (United States) Helen Homans McLean	4–6, 6–2, 6–4
1915	Emily Stokes Weaver 2/3 (United States) Helen Homans McLean	(Norway) Molla Bjurstedt (United States) Florence Ballin	3–6, 8–6, 6–2
1916	(United States) Marie Wagner 3/4 (Norway) Molla Bjurstedt	(United Kingdom) Nora Meyer Schmitz; Emily Stokes Weaver	6–2, 6–3
1917	(United States) Marie Wagner 4/4 (United States) Margaret Taylor	(United States) Mrs. John Anderson (United States) Edith Howe	6–4, 6–4
1918	Emily Stokes Weaver 3/3 (United States) Eleanor Goss Lanning	Mrs. Homer Stuart Green (United States) Caroma Winn	6–3, 11–9
1919	(United States) Hazel Hotchkiss Wightman 1/10 (United States) Marion Zinderstein Jessup 1/5	(United States) Mrs. Albert Humphreys (United States) Bessie Holden	6–1, 6–1
1920	(United States) Mrs. Louis G. Morris (United States) Helene Pollak Falk	(United States) Gertrude Della Torre (United States) Caroma Winn	6–3, 6–4
1921	(United States) Hazel Hotchkiss Wightman (2) (United States) Marion Zinderstein Jessup 2/5	(United States) Molla Bjurstedt Mallory (United States) Mrs. Louis G. Morris	6–2, 7–5
1922	(United States) Mrs. Frank Godfrey (United States) Marion Zinderstein Jessup 3/5	(United States) Molla Bjurstedt Mallory (United States) Mrs. Louis G. Morris	6–4, 6–3
1923	(United States) Mrs. Frank Godfrey (2) (United States) Ann Sheafe Cole	(United States) Hazel Hotchkiss Wightman (United States) Leslie Bancroft	6–4, 6–2
1924	(United States) Hazel Hotchkiss Wightman (3) (United States) Marion Zinderstein Jessup 4/5	(United States) Lilian Scharman Hester (United States) Mrs. Louis G. Morris	6–1, 6–1
1925	(United States) Mrs. Ellis Endicott (United States) Betty Corbiere	(United States) Katherine Gardner (United States) Martha Bayard	8–6, 6–4
1926	(United States) Elizabeth Ryan (United States) Mary Browne	(United States) Hazel Hotchkiss Wightman (United States) Marion Zinderstein Jessup	6–1, 6–3
1927	(United States) Hazel Hotchkiss Wightman (4) (United States) Marion Zinderstein Jessup 5/5	(United States) Margaret Blake (United States) Edith Sigourney	8–6, 1–6, 6–3
1928	(United States) Hazel Hotchkiss Wightman (5) (United States) Sarah Palfrey	(United States) Mrs. J.L. Bremer (United States) Ruth Shedden	6–2, 6–0
1929	(United States) Hazel Hotchkiss Wightman (6) (United States) Sarah Palfrey	(United States) Margaret Blake (United States) Anna Fuller Hubbard	6–2, 6–2
1930	(United States) Hazel Hotchkiss Wightman (7) (United States) Sarah Palfrey	(United States) Edith Sigourney (United States) Marjorie Morrill	6–3, 6–2
1931	(United States) Hazel Hotchkiss Wightman (8) (United States) Sarah Palfrey	(United States) Margaret Blake (United States) Anna Fuller Hubbard	9–7, 6–0
1932	(United States) Marjorie Morrill (United States) Marjorie Gladman Van Ryn	(United States) Hazel Hotchkiss Wightman (United States) Sarah Palfrey	6–3, 6–0
1933	(United States) Hazel Hotchkiss Wightman (9) (United States) Sarah Palfrey (5)	(United States) Mianne Palfrey Hill (United States) Virginia Rice Johnson	6–0, 6–3
1934	(United States) Norma Taubele Barber (United States) Jane Sharp	(United States) Anna Fuller Hubbard Brunie (United States) Lilian Scharman Hester	6–3, 6–2
1935	(United States) Dorothy Andrus (France) Sylvie Jung Henrotin	(United States) Norma Taubele Barber (United States) Jane Sharp	7–5, 6–4
1936	(United States) Dorothy Andrus (2) (France) Sylvie Jung Henrotin (2)	(United States) Norma Taubele Barber (United States) Florence Leboutillier	6–4, 9–7
1937	(United States) Dorothy Andrus (3) (France) Sylvie Jung Henrotin (3)	(United States) Norma Taubele Barber (United States) Florence Leboutillier	6–4, 7–5
1938	(United States) Virginia Rice Johnson (United States) Katherine Winthrop McKean	(United States) Norma Taubele Barber 4/5 (United States) Grace Surber	4–6, 6–4, 6–4
1939	(United States) Norma Taubele Barber (2) (United States) Grace Surber	(United States) Jean Wright (United States) Josephine Sanfilippo	6–1, 6–2
1940	(United States) Norma Taubele Barber (3) (United States) Gracyn Wheeler	(United States) Louise Raymond (United States) Patricia Cumming Stuhler	7–5, 6–4
1941	(United States) Pauline Betz (United States) Dorothy Bundy Cheney	(United States) Hazel Hotchkiss Wightman (United States) Katherine Winthrop McKean	6–4, 6–3
1942	(United States) Virginia Rice Johnson 2/4 (United States) Katherine Winthrop McKean	(United States) Mrs. Philip Theopold (United States) Virginia Ellis	6–2, 6–0
1943	(United States) Pauline Betz 2/2 (United States) Hazel Hotchkiss Wightman 10/10	(United States) Judy Atterbury (United States) Lillian Lopaus	7–5, 6–1
1944	(United States) Virginia Rice Johnson 3/4 (United States) Katherine Winthrop McKean 3/4	(United States) Norma Taubele Barber (United States) Mary Jane Donnalley	3–6, 8–6, 6–0
1945	(United States) Virginia Rice Johnson 4/4 (United States) Katherine Winthrop McKean 4/4	(United States) Helen Pedersen Rihbany (United States) Betty Grimes Stokum	6–4, 7–5
1946	Ruth Carter (United States) Helen Pedersen Rihbany	(United States) Hazel Hotchkiss Wightman (United States) Edith Sigourney	unknown
1947	(United States) Doris Hart 1/2 (United States) Barbara Scofield Davidson 1/3	(United States) Helen Pedersen Rihbany (United States) Katherine Winthrop McKean	6–1, 6–1
1948	(United States) Doris Hart 2/2 (United States) Barbara Scofield Davidson 2/3	(United States) Patricia Canning Todd (United States) Helen Pedersen Rihbany	9–7, 6–4
1949	(United States) Gussie Moran (United States) Marjorie Buck 1/4	(United States) Nancy Chaffee (United States) Barbara Wilkins	6–4, 7–5
1950	(United States) Nancy Chaffee 1/3 (United States) Marjorie Buck 2/4	(United States) Helen Pedersen Rihbany (United States) Betty Rosenquest	6–0, 6–1
1951	(United States) Nancy Chaffee 2/3 (United States) Marjorie Buck 3/4	(United States) Betty Rosenquest (United States) Barbara Scofield Davidson	6–4, 6–2
1952	(United States) Nancy Chaffee Kiner 3/3 (United States) Patricia Canning Todd	(United Kingdom) Helen Fletcher Barker (United Kingdom) Patricia Ward Hales	6–4, 6–4
1953	(Australia) Thelma Coyne Long (United States) Barbara Scofield Davidson 3/3	(United States) Betty Coumbe (United States) Joan Piken	6–0, 6–1
1954	(United States) Dorothy Watman Levine 1/2 (United States) Barbara Ward	(United States) Lois Felix (United States) Katharine Hubbell	6–2, 6–0
1955	(United States) Katharine Hubbell 1/5 (United States) Ruth Jeffery Ryder 1/3	(United States) Millicent Hirsch Lang (United States) Louise Raymond Ganzenmuller	6–2, 4–6, 6–4
1956	(United States) Katharine Hubbell 2/5 (United States) Lois Felix 1/2	(United States) Ruth Jeffery Ryder (United States) Marjorie Buck	3–6, 6–1, 6–3
1957	(United States) Dorothy Watman Levine 2/2 (United States) Nancy O'Connell 1/2	(United States) Katharine Hubbell (United States) Lois Felix	6–3, 6–4
1958	(United States) Carol Hanks Aucamp 1/4 (United States) Nancy O'Connell 2/2	(United States) Mildred Thornton (United States) Katharine Hubbell	9–7, 4–6, 6–4
1959	(United States) Katharine Hubbell 3/5 (United States) Lois Felix 2/2	(United States) Mrs. Arklay Richards (United States) Mrs. Pepper Frey	6–2, 6–2
1960	(United States) Marjorie Buck 4/4 (United States) Ruth Jeffery Ryder 2/3	(United States) Katharine Hubbell (United States) Lois Felix	9–7, 4–6, 6–2
1961	(United States) Katharine Hubbell 4/5 (United States) Janet Hopps Adkisson	(United States) Marjorie Buck (United States) Ruth Jeffery Ryder	4–6, 6–1, 7–5
1962	(United States) Belmar Gunderson (United States) Ruth Jeffery Ryder 3/3	(United States) Carole Wright (United States) Mary Louise Christian	6–8, 6–4, 6–2
1963	(United States) Mary-Ann Eisel 1/5 (United States) Carol Hanks Aucamp 2/4	(United States) Carole Wright (United States) Lena Greene	6–2, 6–2
1964	(United States) Mary Ann Eisel 2/5 (United States) Katharine Hubbell 5/5	(United States) Belmar Gunderson (United States) Betty Swanson	6–3, 6–3
1965	(United States) Mary Ann Eisel 3/5 (United States) Carol Hanks Aucamp 3/4	(United States) Karen Hantze Susman (United States) Nancy Richey	9–7, 4–6, 6–2
1966	(United States) Billie Jean King 1/6 (United States) Rosemary Casals 1/6	(United States) Carol Hanks Aucamp (United States) Justina Bricka Horwitz	3–6, 6–4, 6–2
1967	(United States) Mary Ann Eisel 4/5 (United States) Carol Hanks Aucamp 4/4	(United States) Billie Jean King (United States) Judy Dixon	6–4, 1–6, 6–2
1968	(United States) Billie Jean King 2/6 (United States) Rosemary Casals 2/6	(United States) Mary Ann Eisel (United States) Kathy Harter	6–2, 6–2
1969	(United States) Mary Ann Eisel 5/5 (United States) Valerie Ziegenfuss	(United States) Patti Hogan (United States) Peggy Michel	6–1, 6–3
1970	(United States) Jane Bartkowicz (United States) Nancy Richey	(United States) Mary Ann Eisel Curtis (United States) Valerie Ziegenfuss	8–6, 6–4
1971	(United States) Billie Jean King 3/6 (United States) Rosemary Casals 3/6	(France) Françoise Dürr (United Kingdom) Ann Haydon-Jones	6–3, 7–5
1972	Not held		
1973	(Soviet Union) Marina Kroschina (Soviet Union) Olga Morozova	(Australia) Evonne Goolagong (Australia) Janet Young-Langford	6–2, 6–4
1974	Not held		
1975	(United States) Billie Jean King 4/6 (United States) Rosemary Casals 4/6	(Czechoslovakia) Martina Navratilova (United States) Chris Evert	6–3, 6–4
1976	(United States) Rosemary Casals 5/6 (France) Françoise Dürr	(Netherlands) Betty Stöve (United Kingdom) Virginia Wade	6–0, 6–4
1977	Not held		
1978	(Australia) Kerry Melville Reid (Australia) Wendy Turnbull 1/2	(South Africa) Ilana Kloss (Australia) Lesley Hunt	6–3, 6–3
1979	(United States) Billie Jean King 5/6 (Czechoslovakia) Martina Navratilova 1/4	(Netherlands) Betty Stöve (Australia) Wendy Turnbull	6–4, 7–6
1980	(United States) Ann Kiyomura (United States) Candy Reynolds	(United States) Anne Smith (United States) Paula Smith	6–3, 4–6, 6–1
1981	(United States) Martina Navratilova 2/4 (United States) Pam Shriver 1/3	(United States) Rosemary Casals (Australia) Wendy Turnbull	6–4, 7–5
1982	(United States) Rosemary Casals 6/6 (Australia) Wendy Turnbull 2/2	(United States) Barbara Potter (United States) Sharon Walsh	3–6, 7–6, 6–4
1983	(United States) Billie Jean King 6/6 (United States) Sharon Walsh	(United States) Kathy Jordan (United States) Barbara Potter	3–6, 6–3, 6–4
1984	(United States) Martina Navratilova 3/4 (United States) Pam Shriver 2/3	(United Kingdom) Jo Durie (United States) Ann Kiyomura	6–4, 6–3
1985	(United States) Martina Navratilova 4/4 (United States) Pam Shriver 3/3	(Netherlands) Marcella Mesker (Australia) Elizabeth Smylie	7–5, 6–2
1986	(United States) Kathy Jordan (Australia) Elizabeth Smylie	(Czechoslovakia) Hana Mandlíková (Czechoslovakia) Helena Suková	6–3, 7–5
1987	(United States) Gigi Fernández (United States) Lori McNeil 1/2	(United States) Betsy Nagelsen (Australia) Elizabeth Smylie	6–1, 6–4
1988–2000	Not held		
2001	(South Africa) Amanda Coetzer (United States) Lori McNeil 2/2	(Chinese Taipei) Janet Lee (Indonesia) Wynne Prakusya	6–3, 2–6, 6–0

== See also ==
- U.S. National Indoor Tennis Championships – men's tournament
- U.S. Women's Clay Court Championships
