= 1950 Wimbledon Championships – Women's doubles =

Women's doubles
- 1950 Wimbledon Championships

Final
- Champions: (United States) Louise Brough (United States) Margaret duPont
- Runners-up: (United States) Shirley Fry (United States) Doris Hart
- Score: 6–4, 5–7, 6–1

Details
- Draw: 48 (5 Q )
- Seeds: 4

Events
Singles	men	women		boys	girls
Doubles	men	women	mixed	boys	girls
← 1949 ·	Wimbledon Championships	· 1951 →

Louise Brough and Margaret duPont successfully defended their title, defeating Shirley Fry and Doris Hart in the final, 6–4, 5–7, 6–1 to win the ladies' doubles tennis title at the 1950 Wimbledon Championships.

== Seeds ==
1. (United States) Louise Brough / (United States) Margaret duPont (champions)
2. (United States) Shirley Fry / (United States) Doris Hart (final)
3. (United States) Gussie Moran / (United States) Pat Todd (quarterfinals)
4. (United Kingdom) Betty Harrison / (United Kingdom) Kay Tuckey (quarterfinals)

Click on the seed number of a player to go to their draw section.

== Draw ==
=== Key ===
- Q = Qualifier
- WC = Wild card
- LL = Lucky loser
- Alt = Alternate
- SE = Special exempt
- PR = Protected ranking
- ITF = ITF entry
- JE = Junior exempt
- w/o = Walkover
- r = Retired
- d = Defaulted
- SR = Special ranking

=== Finals ===
Quarterfinals
2	(United States) Shirley Fry (United States) Doris Hart	6	6
(United States) Rita Anderson (United Kingdom) Joan Curry	1	4
3	(United States) Gussie Moran (United States) Pat Todd	6	7	3
(Australia) Thelma Long (United Kingdom) Joy Mottram	1	9	6
(United States) Marjorie Buck (United States) Nancy Chaffee	6	6
4	(United Kingdom) Betty Harrison (United Kingdom) Kay Tuckey	3	3
Q	(United Kingdom) Mary Eyre (United Kingdom) Elsie Phillips	2	2
1	(United States) Louise Brough (United States) Margaret duPont	6	6

Semifinals
2	(United States) Shirley Fry (United States) Doris Hart	6	6
(Australia) Thelma Long (United Kingdom) Joy Mottram	0	2
(United States) Marjorie Buck (United States) Nancy Chaffee	1	3
1	(United States) Louise Brough (United States) Margaret duPont	6	6

Final
2	(United States) Shirley Fry (United States) Doris Hart	4	7	1
1	(United States) Louise Brough (United States) Margaret duPont	6	5	6

=== Top half ===
==== Section 1 ====
First round

Second round
2	(United States) Shirley Fry (United States) Doris Hart	6	6
(Republic of Ireland) Maeve Brennan (Republic of Ireland) MD McCoy	0	1
(United States) Marta Barnett (United States) Helen Rihbany	6	6
(France) Ginette Bucaille (France) Gilberte Jamain	1	0
(Netherlands) Nel Hermsen (Netherlands) Mrs MA Schmier	6	6
(Italy) Annelise Bossi (Italy) Lucia Manfredi	2	0
(United Kingdom) Barbara Behr (United Kingdom) Joey David	1	4
(United States) Rita Anderson (United Kingdom) Joan Curry	6	6

Third round
2	(United States) S Fry (United States) D Hart	6	6
(United States) M Barnett (United States) H Rihbany	1	2
(Netherlands) P Hermsen (Netherlands) Mrs MA Schmier	2	3
(United States) R Anderson (United Kingdom) J Curry	6	6

Quarterfinals
2	(United States) S Fry (United States) D Hart	6	6
(United States) R Anderson (United Kingdom) J Curry	1	4

==== Section 2 ====
First round
3	(United States) Gussie Moran (United States) Pat Todd	6	6
(United Kingdom) Jean Quertier (United Kingdom) Jean Walker-Smith	0	2
(United Kingdom) Bea Walter (United Kingdom) Georgie Woodgate	7	6
(United States) Gloria Butler (Czechoslovakia) Helena Matouš	5	1
(United Kingdom) Lorna Byrne (United Kingdom) Lorna White	6	6
(United Kingdom) Myra Brain (United Kingdom) Margaret Knott	4	4
(United Kingdom) Penny Durlac (United Kingdom) Barbara Knapp	2	3
Q	(United Kingdom) Peggy Knight (United Kingdom) Enid Sutton	6	6
(Kenya) Sheila Dowdeswell (United Kingdom) Edith Middleton	6	6
(United Kingdom) Enid Davey (United Kingdom) Beryl Parker	2	1
(Sweden) Birgit Gullbrandsson-Sandén (Argentina) Mary Terán de Weiss	2	4
(Australia) Thelma Long (United Kingdom) Joy Mottram	6	6
(United Kingdom) Betty Coutts (United Kingdom) Pat Ward	6	6
(United Kingdom) ML David (United Kingdom) BM Goodman	2	3
(United Kingdom) Andy Ross-Dilley (United Kingdom) Joey Ross-Dilley	6	4	1
(United Kingdom) Mrs MW Cooper (United Kingdom) Pat Cowney	4	6	6

Second round
3	(United States) G Moran (United States) P Todd	6	6	6
(United Kingdom) B Walter (United Kingdom) G Woodgate	3	8	3
(United Kingdom) L Byrne (United Kingdom) L White	5	5
Q	(United Kingdom) P Knight (United Kingdom) E Sutton	7	7
(Kenya) S Dowdeswell (United Kingdom) E Middleton	6	6
(Australia) T Long (United Kingdom) J Mottram	2	3
(United Kingdom) E Coutts (United Kingdom) P Ward	6	6
(United Kingdom) Mrs MW Cooper (United Kingdom) P Cowney	3	2

Third round
3	(United States) G Moran (United States) P Todd	6	6
Q	(United Kingdom) P Knight (United Kingdom) E Sutton	4	2
(Australia) T Long (United Kingdom) J Mottram	6	6
(United Kingdom) E Coutts (United Kingdom) P Ward	4	4

Quarterfinals
3	(United States) G Moran (United States) P Todd	6	7	3
(Australia) T Long (United Kingdom) J Mottram	1	9	6

=== Bottom half ===
==== Section 3 ====
First round
(United States) Dorothy Head (United States) Betty Rosenquest	6	6
(United Kingdom) Margaret Carlisle (United Kingdom) Katie Johns	4	2
(United Kingdom) Effie Peters (United Kingdom) Vera Thomas	6	6
(France) Myrtil Dubois (France) Maud Galtier	4	4
(United Kingdom) Nancy Glover (United Kingdom) Freda Hammersley	2	1
(United States) Marjorie Buck (United States) Nancy Chaffee	6	6
Q	(United Kingdom) Valerie Gardner (United Kingdom) Janet Morgan	6	11	6
(United Kingdom) Louise Dick (United Kingdom) Helen Proudfoot	3	13	4
(United Kingdom) Enid Andrews (United Kingdom) Patsy Rodgers	6	6
(Republic of Ireland) Mary Fitzgibbon (Republic of Ireland) Betty Lombard	4	2
Q	(United Kingdom) Pam Bocquet (United Kingdom) Gwen Scott	4	6	4
(United Kingdom) Mary Halford (United Kingdom) Patsy O'Connell	6	4	6
(United Kingdom) Gem Hoahing (United Kingdom) Betty Martin-Davies	7	6
(Sweden) Mary Lagerborg (Austria) Etta Neumann	5	4
(United Kingdom) Audrey Bates (United Kingdom) Ada Ernest	0	1
4	(United Kingdom) Betty Harrison (United Kingdom) Kay Tuckey	6	6

Second round
(United States) D Head (United States) E Rosenquest	6	7
(United Kingdom) E Peters (United Kingdom) V Thomas	2	5
(United States) M Buck (United States) N Chaffee	6	6
Q	(United Kingdom) V Gardner (United Kingdom) J Morgan	0	4
(United Kingdom) E Andrews (United Kingdom) P Rodgers	7	6
(United Kingdom) M Halford (United Kingdom) P O'Connell	5	4
(United Kingdom) C Hoahing (United Kingdom) E Martin-Davies	2	3
4	(United Kingdom) E Harrison (United Kingdom) K Tuckey	6	6

Third round
(United States) D Head (United States) E Rosenquest	9	6
(United States) M Buck (United States) N Chaffee	11	8
(United Kingdom) E Andrews (United Kingdom) P Rodgers	3	0
(United Kingdom) E Harrison (United Kingdom) K Tuckey	6	6

Quarterfinals
(United States) M Buck (United States) N Chaffee	6	6
4	(United Kingdom) E Harrison (United Kingdom) K Tuckey	3	3

==== Section 4 ====
First round

Second round
(United Kingdom) Gladys Lines (United Kingdom) Billie Woodgate	4	1
(United Kingdom) Peggy Dawson-Scott (United Kingdom) Betty Wilford	6	6
(United Kingdom) Rosemary Bulleid (United Kingdom) Angela Mortimer	0	6
Q	(United Kingdom) Mary Eyre (United Kingdom) Elsie Phillips	6	8
(France) Colette Boegner (France) Anne-Marie Seghers	5	3
(United Kingdom) Alex McKelvie (United Kingdom) Wendy Stork	7	6
(United States) Nancy Morrison (United States) Barbara Scofield	6	4
1	(United States) Louise Brough (United States) Margaret duPont	8	6

Third round
(United Kingdom) P Dawson-Scott (United Kingdom) E Wilford	6	3	5
Q	(United Kingdom) M Eyre (United Kingdom) E Phillips	0	6	7
(United Kingdom) A McKelvie (United Kingdom) W Stork	0	0
1	(United States) L Brough (United States) M duPont	6	6

Quarterfinals
Q	(United Kingdom) M Eyre (United Kingdom) E Phillips	2	2
1	(United States) L Brough (United States) M duPont	6	6
