= 1950 in tennis =

This page covers all the important events in the sport of tennis in 1950. It provides the results of notable tournaments throughout the year on both the men's and women's ILTF tennis circuits.

== Australian Open ==
Category	Champion(s)	Finalist(s)	Score
Men's singles	(Australia) Frank Sedgman	(Australia) Ken McGregor	6–3, 6–4, 4–6, 6–1
Women's singles	(United States) Louise Brough	(United States) Doris Hart	6–4, 3–6, 6–4
Men's doubles	(Australia) John Bromwich (Australia) Adrian Quist	(Egypt) Jaroslav Drobný (South Africa) Eric Sturgess	6–3, 5–7, 4–6, 6–3, 8–6
Women's doubles	(United States) Louise Brough (United States) Doris Hart	(Australia) Nancye Wynne Bolton (Australia) Thelma Coyne Long	6–2, 2–6, 6–3
Mixed doubles	(United States) Doris Hart (Australia) Frank Sedgman	(Australia) Joyce Fitch (South Africa) Eric Sturgess	8–6, 6–4

== French Open ==
Category	Champion(s)	Finalist(s)	Score
Men's singles	(United States) Budge Patty	(Egypt) Jaroslav Drobný	6–1, 6–2, 3–6, 5–7, 7–5
Women's singles	(United States) Doris Hart	(United States) Patricia Canning Todd	6–4, 4–6, 6–2
Men's doubles	(United States) Bill Talbert (United States) Tony Trabert	(Egypt) Jaroslav Drobný (South Africa) Eric Sturgess	6–2, 1–6, 10–8, 6–2
Women's doubles	(United States) Doris Hart (United States) Shirley Fry	(United States) Louise Brough (United States) Margaret Osborne duPont	1–6, 7–5, 6–2
Mixed doubles	(United States) Barbara Scofield (Argentina) Enrique Morea	(United States) Patricia Canning Todd (United States) Bill Talbert	walkover

== Wimbledon ==
Category	Champion(s)	Finalist(s)	Score
Men's singles	(United States) Budge Patty	(Australia) Frank Sedgman	6–1, 8–10, 6–2, 6–3
Women's singles	(United States) Louise Brough	(United States) Margaret duPont	6–1, 3–6, 6–1
Men's doubles	(Australia) John Bromwich (Australia) Adrian Quist	(Australia) Geoff Brown (Australia) Bill Sidwell	7–5, 3–6, 6–3, 3–6, 6–2
Women's doubles	(United States) Louise Brough (United States) Margaret duPont	(United States) Shirley Fry (United States) Doris Hart	6–4, 5–7, 6–1
Mixed doubles	(South Africa) Eric Sturgess (United States) Louise Brough	(Australia) Geoff Brown (United States) Pat Todd	11–9, 1–6, 6–4

== US Open ==
Category	Champion(s)	Finalist(s)	Score
Men's singles	(United States) Art Larsen	(United States) Herb Flam	6–3, 4–6, 5–7, 6–4, 6–3
Women's singles	(United States) Margaret Osborne duPont	(United States) Doris Hart	6–3, 6–3
Men's doubles	(Australia) John Bromwich (Australia) Frank Sedgman	(United States) Bill Talbert (United States) Gardnar Mulloy	7–5, 8–6, 3–6, 6–1
Women's doubles	(United States) Louise Brough (United States) Margaret Osborne duPont	(United States) Shirley Fry (United States) Doris Hart	6–2, 6–3
Mixed doubles	(United States) Margaret Osborne duPont (Australia) Ken McGregor	(United States) Doris Hart (Australia) Frank Sedgman	6–4, 3–6, 6–3
