= 1949 Wimbledon Championships – Women's doubles =

Women's doubles
- 1949 Wimbledon Championships

Final
- Champions: (United States) Louise Brough (United States) Margaret duPont
- Runners-up: (United States) Gussie Moran (United States) Pat Todd
- Score: 8–6, 7–5

Details
- Draw: 48 (5 Q )
- Seeds: 4

Events
Singles	men	women		boys	girls
Doubles	men	women	mixed	boys	girls
← 1948 ·	Wimbledon Championships	· 1950 →

Louise Brough and Margaret duPont successfully defended their title, defeating Gussie Moran and Pat Todd in the final, 8–6, 7–5 to win the ladies' doubles tennis title at the 1949 Wimbledon Championships.

== Seeds ==
1. (United States) Louise Brough / (United States) Margaret duPont (champions)
2. (United States) Gussie Moran / (United States) Pat Todd (final)
3. (United Kingdom) Molly Blair / (United Kingdom) Jean Quertier (quarterfinals)
4. (United Kingdom) Joy Gannon / (United Kingdom) Betty Hilton (semifinals)

Click on the seed number of a player to go to their draw section.

== Draw ==
=== Key ===
- Q = Qualifier
- WC = Wild card
- LL = Lucky loser
- Alt = Alternate
- SE = Special exempt
- PR = Protected ranking
- ITF = ITF entry
- JE = Junior exempt
- w/o = Walkover
- r = Retired
- d = Defaulted
- SR = Special ranking

=== Finals ===
Quarterfinals
1	(United States) Louise Brough (United States) Margaret duPont	6	6
(South Africa) Sheila Summers (South Africa) Toots Watermeyer	1	2
4	(United Kingdom) Joy Gannon (United Kingdom) Betty Hilton	6	6
(United Kingdom) Nancy Glover (United Kingdom) Margot Gordon	2	2
(United States) Shirley Fry (United States) Helen Rihbany	6	5	11
3	(United Kingdom) Molly Blair (United Kingdom) Jean Quertier	3	7	9
(United Kingdom) Patsy Rodgers (United Kingdom) Jean Walker-Smith	2	2
2	(United States) Gussie Moran (United States) Pat Todd	6	6

Semifinals
1	(United States) Louise Brough (United States) Margaret duPont	6	6
4	(United Kingdom) Joy Gannon (United Kingdom) Betty Hilton	2	2
(United States) Shirley Fry (United States) Helen Rihbany	0	5
2	(United States) Gussie Moran (United States) Pat Todd	6	7

Final
1	(United States) Louise Brough (United States) Margaret duPont	8	7
2	(United States) Gussie Moran (United States) Pat Todd	6	5

=== Top half ===
==== Section 1 ====
First round

Second round
1	(United States) Louise Brough (United States) Margaret duPont	6	6
(United Kingdom) Mary Halford (United Kingdom) Kay Menzies	3	0
(Republic of Ireland) Maeve Brennan (Netherlands) Nel Hermsen	6	6
(France) Jacqueline Boutin (France) Anne-Marie Seghers	3	2
(United Kingdom) Valerie Miles (United Kingdom) Janet Morgan
(Hungary) Zsuzsa Körmöczy (Hungary) Márta Peterdy-Wolf	w/o
(United Kingdom) Gem Hoahing (United Kingdom) Margot Parker	4	1
(South Africa) Sheila Summers (South Africa) Toots Watermeyer	6	6

Third round
1	(United States) L Brough (United States) M duPont	6	6
(Republic of Ireland) M Brennan (Netherlands) P Hermsen	2	0
(United Kingdom) V Miles (United Kingdom) J Morgan	2	3
(South Africa) S Summers (South Africa) E Watermeyer	6	6

Quarterfinals
1	(United States) L Brough (United States) M duPont	6	6
(South Africa) S Summers (South Africa) E Watermeyer	1	2

==== Section 2 ====
First round
4	(United Kingdom) Joy Gannon (United Kingdom) Betty Hilton	6	6	6
(United Kingdom) Enid Andrews (United Kingdom) Kay Tuckey	8	2	1
(United Kingdom) Penny Durlac (United Kingdom) Barbara Knapp	2	6	3
(United Kingdom) Edith Middleton (United Kingdom) Bea Walter	6	2	6
(United Kingdom) Mary Eyre (United Kingdom) Viola White	6	5
Q	(United Kingdom) Margaret Carlisle (United Kingdom) Katie Johns	8	7
(United Kingdom) Phyllis King (United Kingdom) Wendy Stork	7	6
(Australia) Joan Bathurst (Kenya) Sheila Dowdeswell	5	4
(Sweden) Birgit Gullbrandsson (Sweden) Mary Lagerborg	6	6
Q	(United Kingdom) Lesley Fulton (United Kingdom) Nancy Liebert	3	4
(United Kingdom) Nancy Glover (United Kingdom) Margot Gordon	6	6
(United States) G Butler (United States) Arvilla McGuire	2	1
Q	Mrs FG Downing; Mrs EM Frost	9	2	4
(United Kingdom) Louise Anderson; Mrs M Guthrie	7	6	6
(Egypt) Georgina Greiss (South Africa) Betsy Venter	4	7	6
(United Kingdom) Betty Cooke (United Kingdom) Margot Flowerdew	6	5	4

Second round
4	(United Kingdom) J Gannon (United Kingdom) E Hilton	6	4	6
(United Kingdom) E Middleton (United Kingdom) B Walter	4	6	2
Q	(United Kingdom) M Carlisle (United Kingdom) K Johns	4	3
(United Kingdom) P King (United Kingdom) W Stork	6	6
(Sweden) B Gullbrandsson (Sweden) M Lagerborg	7	2	3
(United Kingdom) N Glover (United Kingdom) M Gordon	5	6	6
(United Kingdom) L Anderson; Mrs M Guthrie	9	6
(Egypt) G Greiss (South Africa) B Venter	7	2

Third round
4	(United Kingdom) J Gannon (United Kingdom) E Hilton	3	6	6
(United Kingdom) P King (United Kingdom) W Stork	6	0	0
(United Kingdom) N Glover (United Kingdom) M Gordon	6	6
(United Kingdom) L Anderson; Mrs M Guthrie	1	4

Quarterfinals
4	(United Kingdom) J Gannon (United Kingdom) E Hilton	6	6
(United Kingdom) N Glover (United Kingdom) M Gordon	2	2

The nationalities of Mrs FG Downing, Mrs EM Frost and Mrs M Guthrie are unknown.

=== Bottom half ===
==== Section 3 ====
First round
(United Kingdom) Gladys Lines (United Kingdom) Pat Ward	6	7
(Italy) Annelise Bossi (Belgium) Miriamme de Borman	2	5
Q	(United Kingdom) Peggy Knight (United Kingdom) Enid Sutton	6	6
(Switzerland) Violette Rigollet (Czechoslovakia) Edith Sutz	0	3
(United States) Rita Anderson (United Kingdom) Billie Woodgate	0	0
(Australia) Joyce Fitch (Australia) Thelma Long	6	6
(United States) Shirley Fry (United States) Helen Rihbany	6	6
(France) Jacqueline Marcellin (Czechoslovakia) Helena Straubeová	3	0
(United Kingdom) Patsy O'Connell (United Kingdom) Effie Peters	6	8
(United Kingdom) Mrs MW Cooper (United Kingdom) Pat Cowney	1	6
Q	(United Kingdom) Andy Ross-Dilley (United Kingdom) Joey Ross-Dilley	1	4
(France) Nelly Adamson (France) Colette Boegner	6	6
(Austria) Hilde Doleschell (Argentina) Mary Terán de Weiss	6	6
(United Kingdom) N Cole (United Kingdom) Hilaire Newberry	1	2
(Norway) Laila Schou Nilsen (United Kingdom) Gwen Simmers	3	3
3	(United Kingdom) Molly Blair (United Kingdom) Jean Quertier	6	6

Second round
(United Kingdom) G Lines (United Kingdom) P Ward	6	3	2
Q	(United Kingdom) P Knight (United Kingdom) E Sutton	4	6	6
(Australia) J Fitch (Australia) T Long	7	5	4
(United States) S Fry (United States) H Rihbany	5	7	6
(United Kingdom) P O'Connell (United Kingdom) E Peters	4	0
(France) N Adamson (France) C Boegner	6	6
(Austria) H Doleschell (Argentina) M Terán de Weiss	0	3
3	(United Kingdom) M Blair (United Kingdom) J Quertier	6	6

Third round
Q	(United Kingdom) P Knight (United Kingdom) E Sutton	2	2
(United States) S Fry (United States) H Rihbany	6	6
(France) N Adamson (France) C Boegner	0	9	2
3	(United Kingdom) M Blair (United Kingdom) J Quertier	6	7	6

Quarterfinals
(United States) S Fry (United States) H Rihbany	6	5	11
3	(United Kingdom) M Blair (United Kingdom) J Quertier	3	7	9

==== Section 4 ====
First round

Second round
(United Kingdom) Freda Hammersley (United Kingdom) Georgie Woodgate	7	9
(Republic of Ireland) Mary Fitzgibbon (Republic of Ireland) Betty Lombard	5	7
(United Kingdom) Natalie Gourlay (United Kingdom) Joy Hibbert	7	2	1
(United Kingdom) Patsy Rodgers (United Kingdom) Jean Walker-Smith	5	6	6
(United Kingdom) Betty Coutts (United Kingdom) Joey David	6	6
(United States) Virginia Boyer (United Kingdom) Gay Chandler	2	4
(United Kingdom) Peggy Dawson-Scott (United Kingdom) Betty Wilford	1	6	5
2	(United States) Gussie Moran (United States) Pat Todd	6	2	7

Third round
(United Kingdom) W Hammersley (United Kingdom) G Woodgate	5	2
(United Kingdom) P Rodgers (United Kingdom) J Walker-Smith	7	6
(United Kingdom) E Coutts (United Kingdom) J David	2	2
2	(United States) G Moran (United States) P Todd	6	6

Quarterfinals
(United Kingdom) P Rodgers (United Kingdom) J Walker-Smith	2	2
2	(United States) G Moran (United States) P Todd	6	6
