= 1950 Wimbledon Championships – Women's singles =

Tennis tournament event

Women's singles
- 1950 Wimbledon Championships

Final
- Champion: (United States) Louise Brough
- Runner-up: (United States) Margaret duPont
- Score: 6–1, 3–6, 6–1

Details
- Draw: 96 (10 Q )
- Seeds: 8

Events
Singles	men	women		boys	girls
Doubles	men	women	mixed	boys	girls
← 1949 ·	Wimbledon Championships	· 1951 →

Louise Brough successfully defended her title, defeating Margaret duPont in the final, 6–1, 3–6, 6–1 to win the ladies' singles tennis title at the 1950 Wimbledon Championships.

== Seeds ==
1. (United States) Louise Brough (champion)
2. (United States) Margaret duPont (final)
3. (United States) Doris Hart (semifinals)
4. (United States) Pat Todd (semifinals)
5. (United States) Shirley Fry (quarterfinals)
6. (United Kingdom) Betty Harrison (quarterfinals)
7. (United States) Gussie Moran (quarterfinals)
8. (Italy) Annalisa Bossi (first round)

Click on the seed number of a player to go to their draw section.

== Draw ==
=== Key ===
- Q = Qualifier
- WC = Wild card
- LL = Lucky loser
- Alt = Alternate
- SE = Special exempt
- PR = Protected ranking
- ITF = ITF entry
- JE = Junior exempt
- w/o = Walkover
- r = Retired
- d = Defaulted
- SR = Special ranking

=== Finals ===
Quarterfinals
1	(United States) Louise Brough	2	6	6
5	(United States) Shirley Fry	6	3	0
3	(United States) Doris Hart	6	6
(United States) Barbara Scofield	1	1
6	(United Kingdom) Betty Harrison	2	2
4	(United States) Pat Todd	6	6
7	(United States) Gussie Moran	4	4
2	(United States) Margaret duPont	6	6

Semifinals
1	(United States) Louise Brough	6	6
3	(United States) Doris Hart	4	3
4	(United States) Pat Todd	6	6	6
2	(United States) Margaret duPont	8	4	8

Final
1	(United States) Louise Brough	6	3	6
2	(United States) Margaret duPont	1	6	1

=== Top half ===
==== Section 1 ====
First round

Second round
1	(United States) Louise Brough	6	6
(United Kingdom) Leonie Brighton	0	1
(United Kingdom) Joy Mottram	6	6
(Netherlands) Nel Hermsen	2	1
(United Kingdom) Evelyn Moeller	6	2	4
(United Kingdom) Enid Andrews	4	6	6
(United States) Betty Rosenquest	6	5
(France) Ginette Bucaille	8	7

Third round
1	(United States) L Brough	9	6
(United Kingdom) J Mottram	7	2
(United Kingdom) E Andrews	2	7	6
(France) G Bucaille	6	5	2

Fourth round
1	(United States) L Brough	6	6
(United Kingdom) E Andrews	0	0

==== Section 2 ====
First round

Second round
5	(United States) Shirley Fry	6	6
(United Kingdom) Susan Partridge	3	2
(United States) Rita Anderson	6	6
(United Kingdom) Joan Quelch	2	1
(Republic of Ireland) Betty Lombard	9	5	6
Q	(United Kingdom) Margaret Knott	7	7	3
Q	(United Kingdom) Jean Trower	6	2	1
(United Kingdom) Joan Curry	4	6	6

Third round
5	(United States) S Fry	6	6
(United States) R Anderson	1	1
(Republic of Ireland) E Lombard	4	5
(United Kingdom) J Curry	6	7

Fourth round
5	(United States) S Fry	6	7
(United Kingdom) J Curry	2	5

==== Section 3 ====
First round
3	(United States) Doris Hart	6	8
(United Kingdom) Kay Tuckey	4	6
(Sweden) Birgit Gullbrandsson-Sandén	6	6
(Kenya) Sheila Dowdeswell	3	4
(France) Myrtil Dubois	2	3
(United Kingdom) Gem Hoahing	6	6
(United Kingdom) Joey David	4	0
Q	(United Kingdom) Katie Johns	6	6
(United States) Helen Rihbany	6	6
(United Kingdom) Effie Peters	0	4
(United States) Nancy Chaffee	6	6
(United States) Marta Barnett	2	4
(United Kingdom) Freda Hammersley	6	6
(United Kingdom) Bea Walter	3	4
(United Kingdom) Betty Coutts	3	4
(United Kingdom) Joy Hibbert	6	6

Second round
3	(United States) D Hart	6	6
(Sweden) B Gullbrandsson-Sandén	1	0
(United Kingdom) C Hoahing	6	6
Q	(United Kingdom) K Johns	4	3
(United States) H Rihbany	1	3
(United States) N Chaffee	6	6
(United Kingdom) W Hammersley	7	6
(United Kingdom) J Hibbert	5	1

Third round
3	(United States) D Hart	6	6
(United Kingdom) C Hoahing	2	3
(United States) N Chaffee	6	6
(United Kingdom) W Hammersley	2	0

Fourth round
3	(United States) D Hart	6	6
(United States) N Chaffee	2	2

==== Section 4 ====
First round
8	(Italy) Annalisa Bossi	1	7	3
(Argentina) Mary Terán de Weiss	6	5	6
(United Kingdom) Rosemary Walsh	6	8
Q	(France) Andrée Varin	8	10
(United Kingdom) Pam Bocquet	6	6
(United Kingdom) Wendy Stork	4	3
(United Kingdom) Billie Woodgate	8	9
(United Kingdom) Gladys Lines	6	7
(United Kingdom) Rosemary Bulleid	3	6	6
(France) Maud Galtier	6	2	3
(United Kingdom) Hilary Stoodley-Morgan	4	1
(United States) Barbara Scofield	6	6
(United Kingdom) Peggy Dawson-Scott	6	7
Q	(United Kingdom) Edie Luxton	3	5
(France) Gilberte Jamain	6	7
(United Kingdom) Andy Ross-Dilley	4	5

Second round
(Argentina) M Terán de Weiss	6	6
Q	(France) A Varin	1	1
(United Kingdom) P Bocquet	6	6
(United Kingdom) R Woodgate	2	1
(United Kingdom) R Bulleid	0	1
(United States) B Scofield	6	6
(United Kingdom) P Dawson-Scott	6	6
(France) G Jamain	0	3

Third round
(Argentina) M Terán de Weiss	6	6
(United Kingdom) P Bocquet	4	3
(United States) B Scofield	6	7
(United Kingdom) P Dawson-Scott	1	5

Fourth round
(Argentina) M Terán de Weiss	4	6
(United States) B Scofield	6	8

=== Bottom half ===
==== Section 5 ====
First round
(Belgium) Marcelle van Leer	3	1
(United Kingdom) Pat Ward	6	6
(United Kingdom) Edith Middleton	0	0
(Australia) Thelma Long	6	6
(United Kingdom) Margaret Carlisle	6	3	4
(Netherlands) Mrs MA Schmier	2	6	6
(United Kingdom) Barbara Behr	2	2
(United States) Dorothy Head	6	6
(United Kingdom) Georgie Woodgate	6	6
(United Kingdom) Lorna Byrne	4	2
(United Kingdom) Beryl Parker	1	6	5
Q	(United Kingdom) Jenny Wagstaff	6	2	7
(United States) Nancy Morrison	6	6
(United Kingdom) Pat Cowney	1	2
(United Kingdom) Barbara Knapp	3	1
6	(United Kingdom) Betty Harrison	6	6

Second round
(United Kingdom) P Ward	2	2
(Australia) T Long	6	6
(Netherlands) Mrs MA Schmier	2	0
(United States) D Head	6	6
(United Kingdom) G Woodgate	6	6
Q	(United Kingdom) J Wagstaff	1	0
(United States) N Morrison	3	5
6	(United Kingdom) E Harrison	6	7

Third round
(Australia) T Long	5	7	2
(United States) D Head	7	5	6
(United Kingdom) G Woodgate	7	5
6	(United Kingdom) E Harrison	9	7

Fourth round
(United States) D Head	3	2
6	(United Kingdom) E Harrison	6	6

==== Section 6 ====
First round
(United Kingdom) Alex McKelvie	6	6
(United Kingdom) Audrey Bates	4	3
(United Kingdom) Margot Parker	7	4
(United Kingdom) Janet Morgan	9	6
(United Kingdom) Gay Chandler	6	6
Q	(United Kingdom) Jacqueline Beswick	4	3
(United Kingdom) Phyllis King	5	7	6
(United Kingdom) Margaret Emerson	7	5	0
(United Kingdom) Betty Wilford	7	6
Q	(United Kingdom) Elsie Phillips	5	4
(United Kingdom) Helen Fletcher	3	0
(United Kingdom) Patsy Rodgers	6	6
Q	(United Kingdom) Nancy Liebert	2	4
(United Kingdom) Lorna Cornell	6	6
Q	(United Kingdom) Gill Worrall	0	0
4	(United States) Pat Todd	6	6

Second round
(United Kingdom) A McKelvie	6	0	6
(United Kingdom) J Morgan	4	6	3
(United Kingdom) G Chandler	2	3
(United Kingdom) P King	6	6
(United Kingdom) E Wilford	7	2	4
(United Kingdom) P Rodgers	5	6	6
(United Kingdom) L Cornell	1	2
4	(United States) P Todd	6	6

Third round
(United Kingdom) A McKelvie	6	6
(United Kingdom) P King	4	4
(United Kingdom) P Rodgers	0	1
4	(United States) P Todd	6	6

Fourth round
(United Kingdom) Alex McKelvie	1	2
4	(United States) P Todd	6	6

==== Section 7 ====
First round

Second round
(Republic of Ireland) Mary Fitzgibbon	5	1
(United Kingdom) Mary Halford	7	6
(France) Josette Amouretti	6	6
(South Africa) Solveig Glietenberg	4	4
(Austria) Etta Neuman	0	5
(France) Anne-Marie Seghers	6	7
(Sweden) Mary Lagerborg	4	6
7	(United States) Gussie Moran	6	8

Third round
(United Kingdom) M Halford	6	6
(France) J Amouretti	2	3
(France) A-M Seghers	4	2
7	(United States) G Moran	6	6

Fourth round
(United Kingdom) M Halford	2	1
7	(United States) G Moran	6	6

==== Section 8 ====
First round

Second round
(Israel) Gertrude Kornfeld	2	6	3
(Italy) Lucia Manfredi	6	4	6
(United Kingdom) Jean Quertier	6	6
(Czechoslovakia) Helena Matouš	2	2
(Switzerland) Violette Rigollet	2	2
(United Kingdom) Jean Walker-Smith	6	6
(United Kingdom) Betty Cooke	0	3
2	(United States) Margaret duPont	6	6

Third round
(Italy) L Manfredi	0	0
(United Kingdom) J Quertier	6	6
(United Kingdom) J Walker-Smith	3	3
2	(United States) M duPont	6	6

Fourth round
(United Kingdom) J Quertier	2	2
2	(United States) M duPont	6	6

Preceded by 1950 French Championships – Women's singles	Grand Slam women's singles	Succeeded by 1950 U.S. National Championships – Women's singles
