= Bermuda Open =

Defunct tennis tournament
- Event name: Bermuda Open Tennis Championships (1879-?); Bermuda Championships (1914-1974); Bermuda Open (1975). Bermuda Classic (1976)
- Tour: Grand Prix circuit (1975–76)
- Founded: 1879
- Abolished: 1976
- Location: Hamilton, Bermuda; Paget, Bermuda
- Surface: Hardcourt (1914-1944, 79); Clay (1947–76)

The Bermuda Open was originally founded as the Bermuda Open Tennis Championships in 1879 the later called the Bermuda Championships in 1914 and was staged in Hamilton, During the 1950s and 1960s it was called the Bermuda International Championships. and was staged under that name until 1974. In 1976 the tournament was known as the Bermuda Classic. From 1914 until at least 1944 it was played on outdoor hard courts. In later years it was held in Paget in Bermuda and played on outdoor clay courts.

== History ==
The first known tennis event to be staged in Bermuda occurred in September 1876 when a Bermuda Tournament for women was held only one time, that was won by Mary G. Gray. The first edition of the Bermuda Open Tennis Championships was staged in 1879 at Hamilton, the men's doubles event was won by Pelham Von Donop and Charles Wood. By 1914 the tournament was known as the Bermuda Championships. In 1950s-1960s the denomination used was the Bermuda International or sometimes the Bermuda Invitation (for the women's events). The tournament was also staged at Paget the last time occurring in 1968. The original surface was hard courts until 1944 when it switched to clay courts. In 1975 the Bermuda Championships was rebranded as the Bermuda Open. In 1976 at the final edition its name was changed again to the Bermuda Classic.

== Finals ==
ILTF World Circuit
ILTF Grand Prix Circuit

=== Men's singles ===
(incomplete roll)

Year	Champions	Runners-up	Score
Bermuda Championships
1914	(United Kingdom) Arthur Berger	(United States) Albert J. Ostendorf	6–2, 6–1 ret.
1914/1919	No competition (due to WWI)		
1922	(United States) Lawrence Bridges Rice	(United States) Vinnie Richards	6–3, 1–6, 6–1, 6–2.
1923	(United States) Vinnie Richards	(United States) Lawrence Bridges Rice	6–3, 6–3, 6–0.
1924	(United States) Herbert Bowman	(United States) Gerald Emerson	4–6, 6–3, 6–2, 6–2.
1925	(United States) Fred Anderson	(United Kingdom) F. R. Leighton Crawford	5–7, 2–6, 6–3, 6–3, 6–3.
1926	(United States) Herbert Bowman (2)	(Canada) Willard Crocker	6–8, 6–4, 6–2, 0–6, 6–3.
1927	(United States) George Lott	(United States) Fritz Mercur	4–6, 6–2, 7–5, 12–10.
1928	(United States) Herbert Bowman (3)	(United States) Hare W. Powell Jr.	6–4, 6–1, 6–3.
1929	(United States) Herbert Bowman (4)	(United States) J. Gilbert Hall	3–6, 6–3, 6–4, 8–6.
1930	(United States) Herbert Bowman (5)	(United States) Bruce Barnes	6–4, 6–3, 6–2.
1931	(United States) John Doeg	(United States) Berkeley Bell	6–4, 2–6, 6–1, 0–6, 6–3.
1932	(United Kingdom) Fred Perry	(United Kingdom) Harry Lee	4–6, 6–1, 6–2, 6–4.
1933	(United States) Cliff Sutter	(United States) Gregory Mangin	6–2, 1–6, 6–2, 6–2.
1934	(United States) Lester Stoefen	(United States) Wilmer Allison	6–1, 6–2, 1–6, 6–3.
1935	(United States) Bryan Grant	(United States) J. Gilbert Hall	6–0, 6–0, 6–4.
1936	(United States) Bryan Grant (2)	(Canada) Bob Murray	6–4, 3–6, 1–6, 6–2, 7–5.
1937	(United States) Frank Parker	(Canada) Bob Murray	6–1, 6–0, 6–2.
1938	(United States) Wayne Sabin	(United States) Don McNeill	4–6, 6–3, 6–3, 6–4.
1939	(United States) Bobby Riggs	(United States) Elwood Cooke	6–3, 1–6, 1–6, 6–2, 6–4.
1940	(United States) Elwood Cooke	(United States) Gardnar Mulloy	6–1, 6–4, 6–3.
1941	(Bermuda) Brownlow Eve	(Bermuda) William Freisenbruch	6–4, 3–6, 6–0.
1942/1943	No competition (due to WWII)		
Bermuda International Championships
1944	(Canada) Jack Skelton	(Bermuda) Brownlow Eve	6–1, 6–2.
1947	(United States) Earl Cochell	(United States) Sidney Wood	6–4, 4–6, 6–1, 6–3.
1948	(United States) Bill Talbert	(France) Marcel Bernard	6–3, 6–2, 5–7, 7–5.
1949	(United States) Earl Cochell (2)	(United States) Sidney Wood	6–2, 11–9, 6–4.
1950	(United States) Bill Talbert (2)	(United States) Tony Trabert	6–3, 1–6, 6–1, 6–2.
1951	(United States) Vic Seixas	(United States) Ham Richardson	6–4, 9–7, 6–4.
1952	(United States) Vic Seixas (2)	(United States) Bill Talbert	5–7, 1–6, 6–1, 6–1, 6–0.
1953	(United States) Gardnar Mulloy	(United States) Fred Kovaleski	6–2, 3–6, 6–3, 9–7.
1954	(United States) Irvin Dorfman	(United States) Jordan Bentley	6–1, 6–1.
1955	(United States) Bill Tully	(Bermuda) John Riihiluoma	6–8, 6–2, 6–3, 6–4.
1956	(United States) Tony Vincent	(United States) Bob Freedman	6–4, 6–4.
1957	(United States) Tony Vincent (2)	(United States) Don Thompson	6–2, 9–7
1959	(United States) Kingman Lambert	(United States) Don Thompson	6–3, 6–0.
1961	(United States) Gilmore (Gil) Rothrock	(United States) Leif Beck	6–1, 6–1.
1963	(United States) Bill Tully (2)	(United States) Alan Fleming	6–3, 6–0.
1964	(United States) Don Thompson	(United States) Alan Fleming	2–6, 8–6, 9–7.
1965	(United States) Bill Tym	(United States) John Fleitz	2–6, 8–6, 9–7.
1966	(United States) Bill Tym (2)	(United States) Ellis Slack	6–2, 7–5.
1967	(United States) Ellis Slack	(United States) John Galinato	6–2, 6–3.
1968	(United States) Ellis Slack (2)	(United States) John Galinato	2–6, 7–5, 6–3.
↓ Open era ↓
1970	(Canada) Harry Fauquier	(Canada) Keith Carpenter	6–2, 6–1.
1972	(United States) Jim Hanlon	(Austria) Ladislav Legenstein	6–3, 6–4.
1974	(United States) Claude Schoenlank	(Austria) Ladislav Legenstein	6–3, 6–4.
Bermuda Open
1975	(United States) Jimmy Connors	(United States) Vitas Gerulaitis	6–1, 6–4
Bermuda Classic
1976	(United States) Cliff Richey	(United States) Gene Mayer	7–6, 6–2
Bermuda Open
1979	(Bermuda) Stephen Alger	(Canada) Harry Fauquier	6–3, 6–2.

=== Women' singles ===
(incomplete roll)

Championship of Bermuda
Year	Champions	Runners-up	Score
1889	(Colony of Natal) Mabel Grant	(United States) Grace Roosevelt	4–6, 6–3, 6–3
Bermuda Championships
1913	(Bermuda) Bessie Gosling Harvey	(Bermuda) Mary Gray	6–4, 4–6, 6–4
1914	(Bermuda) Bessie Gosling Harvey (2)	(United States) Marion Cresswell	walkover
1915-19	Not held (due to World War I)		
1922	(United States) Marie Wagner	(Bermuda) Miss Yuillo	6–0, 3–6, 6–1
1923	(United States) Mayme McDonald	(Bermuda) Gladys Hutchings	6–4, 6–4
1924	(United States) Mollie Thayer	(Bermuda) Gladys Hutchings	8–6, 6–4
1925	(United Kingdom) Mary Hart McIlquham	(United Kingdom) Joan Reid-Thomas	6–2, 6–0
1926	(United States) Martha Bayard	(Bermuda) Gladys Hutchings	6–2, 6–2
1927	(United States) Martha Bayard (2)	(United States) Penelope Anderson	6–2, 2–6, 6–1
1928	(United States) Alice Francis	(Bermuda) Gladys Hutchings	6–3, 6–1
1929	(United States) Penelope Anderson	(United Kingdom) Mary Harland	7–9, 6–4, 6–2
1930	(United States) Edith Sigourney	(United States) Penelope Anderson	2–6, 6–3, 8–6
1931	(United States) Sarah Palfrey	(United States) Marjorie Morrill	6–3, 6–2
1932	(United States) Sarah Palfrey (2)	(United Kingdom) Betty Nuthall	6–4, 4–6, 6–4
1933	(United States) Virginia Rice	(United States) Virginia Hilleary	10–8, 6–3
1934	(United States) Marjorie Sachs	(United States) Penelope Anderson McBride	5–7, 6–4, 6–2
1935	(France) Sylvie Jung Henrotin	(United States) Dorothy Andrus	walkover
1936	(France) Sylvie Jung Henrotin (2)	(United States) Norma Taubele	6–2, 8–6
1937	(United States) Helen Pedersen	(United States) Penelope Anderson McBride	6–1, 6–2
1938	(France) Sylvie Jung Henrotin (3)	(United States) Marjorie Gladman van Ryn	3–6, 6–4, 6–2
1939	(United States) Helen Bernhard	(United States) Pauline Betz	6–3, 7–5
1940	(United States) Sarah Palfrey Fabyan (3)	(United States) Pauline Betz	6–2, 6–4
1941	(Bermuda) Gladys Hutchings	(United States) Barbara Robinson Freisenbruch	5–7, 6–3, 7–5
1942-43	Not held (due to World War II)		
Bermuda International Championships
1944	(United States) Barbara Robinson Freisenbruch	(Bermuda) Gladys Hutchings	6–1, 6–3
1947	(United States) Doris Hart	(United States) Barbara Scofield	6–2, 9–7
1948	(United States) Doris Hart (2)	(United States) Pat Canning Todd	4–6, 6–1, 6–2
1949	(United States) Dorothy Head	(United States) Nancy Chaffee	6–2, 6–1
1950	(United States) Betty Rosenquest	(United States) Helen Pedersen Rihbany	5–7, 6–3, 6–4
Bermuda Invitation
1951	(United States) Beverly Baker	(United States) Barbara Scofield	9–7, 7–5
Bermuda International Championships
1952	(United States) Pat Canning Todd	(United States) Barbara Scofield Davidson	6–4, 6–0
Bermuda Invitation
1953	(United States) Louise Brough	(United States) Margaret Osborne duPont	9–7, 4–6, 6–1
1954	(Bermuda) Heather Nicholls Brewer	(United States) Kay Hubbell	6–2, 6–3
1955	(Bermuda) Sheila West Gosling	(Bermuda) J. Pollitt	2–6, 6–3, 6–1
Bermuda International Championships
1956	(Bermuda) Sheila West Gosling (2)	(Bermuda) Mrs J. Jones	6–2, 6–3
1957	(Bermuda) Sheila West Gosling (3)	(Bermuda) Mrs J. Jones	6–2, 6–1
1957	(United States) Florence Blanchard	(Bermuda) Ann Alger	6–4, 6–3
Bermuda Invitation
1959	(United States) Barbara Scofield Davidson	(United States) Elizabeth Coleman	6–2, 6–4
1961	(United States) Dottie Head Knode (2)	(United States) Barbara Scofield Davidson	6–0, 6–3
1964	(United States) Barbara Scofield Davidson	(United Kingdom) Jean French	6–1, 6–1
1965	(United States) Alice Tym	(United States) Kay Hubbell	6–4, 7–5
1966	(United States) Alice Tym (2)	(United States) Kay Hubbell	6–1, 6–2
↓ Open era ↓
1970	(Bermuda) Ann Alger	(United States) Grace Rathbun Findlay	7–5, 7–5

=== Men's Doubles ===
Year	Champions	Runners-up	Score
Bermuda Open Tennis Championships
1879	(England) Pelham Von Donop (England) Charles Wood	? ?	?
Bermuda Open
1975	Not held		
Bermuda Classic
1976	(United States) Mike Cahill (United States) John Whitlinger	(Australia) Dick Crealy (Australia) Ray Ruffels	6–4, 4–6, 7–6

== See also ==
- XL Bermuda Open, a tennis tournament held between 1993 and 2008
