= 1949 French Championships – Women's singles =

Women's singles
- 1949 French Championships

Final
- Champion: (United States) Margaret duPont
- Runner-up: (France) Nelly Adamson
- Score: 7–5, 6–2

Details
- Draw: 52
- Seeds: 16

Events
Singles	men	women
Doubles	men	women
← 1948 ·	French Championships	· 1950 →

First-seeded Margaret duPont defeated Nelly Adamson 7–5, 6–2 in the final to win the women's singles tennis title at the 1949 French Championships.

== Seeds ==
The seeded players are listed below. Margaret duPont is the champion; others show the round in which they were eliminated.

1. (United States) Margaret duPont (champion)
2. (United States) Louise Brough (third round)
3. (France) Nelly Adamson (finalist)
4. (South Africa) Sheila Summers (semifinals)
5. (United Kingdom) Betty Hilton (first round)
6. (United States) Helen Rihbany (quarterfinals)
7. (Italy) Annalisa Bossi (semifinals)
8. (United Kingdom) Jean Quertier (quarterfinals)
9. (Netherlands) Nel Hermsen (third round)
10. (France) Monique Hamelin (third round)
11. (Italy) Helena Straubeová (first round)
12. (United States) Virginia Lee Boyer (first round)
13. (France) Jacqueline Patorni (third round)
14. (United Kingdom) Joy Gannon (third round)
15. (United Kingdom) Joan P. Curry (quarterfinals)
16. (Italy) Nicla Migliori (third round)

== Draw ==
=== Key ===
- Q = Qualifier
- WC = Wild card
- LL = Lucky loser
- r = Retired

=== Finals ===
Quarterfinals
1	(United States) Margaret duPont	6	6
8	(United Kingdom) Jean Quertier	4	2
4	(South Africa) Sheila Summers	6	6
(France) Anne-Marie Seghers	3	1
6	(United States) Helen Rihbany	9	3	3
3	(France) Nelly Adamson	7	6	6
7	(Italy) Annalisa Bossi	6	4	6
15	(United Kingdom) Joan P. Curry	3	6	3

Semifinals
1	(United States) Margaret duPont	6	6
4	(South Africa) Sheila Summers	3	3
3	(France) Nelly Adamson	6	6
7	(Italy) Annalisa Bossi	3	0

Finals
1	(United States) Margaret duPont	7	6
3	(France) Nelly Adamson	5	2

=== Earlier rounds ===
==== Section 1 ====
First round
(Israel) Kornfeld	8	5	5
9	(Netherlands) Hermsen	6	7	7
(France) Bernard	8	8	6
(United States) Butler	10	6	3

Second round
1	(United States) duPont	6	6
(France) Boegner	0	3
(Finland) Harline-Arni
16	(Italy) Migliori
8	(United Kingdom) Quertier	8	7
(South Africa) Watermeyer	6	5
9	(Netherlands) Hermsen	6	6
(France) Bernard	3	2

Third round
1	(United States) duPont	6	6
16	(Italy) Migliori	2	2
8	(United Kingdom) Quertier	3	6	6
9	(Netherlands) Hermsen	6	1	2

Quarterfinals
1	(United States) duPont	6	6
8	(United Kingdom) Quertier	4	2

==== Section 2 ====
First round
4	(South Africa) Summers	6	6
(United Kingdom) Hibbert	3	0
(France) Brunnarius	6	6
(Netherlands) Scholten-Klein	3	2
13	(France) Patorni	6	6
(Switzerland) Rigollet	4	3
(France) Hollier-Larousse	6	6
(Italy) San Donnino	2	4
5	(United Kingdom) Hilton	6	1	0
(France) Seghers	4	6	6
(France) Delagrave	2	2
(Kenya) Dowdeswell	6	6
12	(United States) Boyer	2	7	0
(France) Marcellin	6	5	6
(Belgium) De Borman	6	6
(France) Bourbonnais	1	2

Second round
4	(South Africa) Summers	6	6
(France) Brunnarius	2	3
13	(France) Patorni	6	6
(France) Hollier-Larousse	4	4
(France) Seghers	6	6
(Kenya) Dowdeswell	3	2
(France) Marcellin	9	6
(Belgium) De Borman	7	2

Third round
4	(South Africa) Summers	6	6
13	(France) Patorni	4	2
(France) Seghers	6	6
(France) Marcellin	4	4

Quarterfinals
4	(South Africa) Summers	6	6
(France) Seghers	3	1

==== Section 3 ====
First round
(France) Jamain	4	6	9
11	(Italy) Straubeová	6	4	7
(France) De Cazalet	8	4	6
(Czechoslovakia) Sutz	6	6	2
(Italy) Manfredi	6	7
(France) Barbier	0	5
(France) Galtier	2	1
6	(United States) Rihbany	6	6
(France) Jucker	4	16	5
(France) Halff	6	14	7
14	(United Kingdom) Gannon	6	6
(France) Boutin	3	4
(France) Foy	6	6
(France) Inglebert	4	3
(United States) McGuire	2	2
3	(France) Adamson	6	6

Second round
(France) Jamain	3	9
(France) De Cazalet	6	11
(Italy) Manfredi	0	8	7
6	(United States) Rihbany	6	6	9
(France) Halff	4	8	3
14	(United Kingdom) Gannon	6	6	6
(France) Foy	2	0
3	(France) Adamson	6	6

Third round
(France) De Cazalet	7	2	7
6	(United States) Rihbany	5	6	9
14	(United Kingdom) Gannon	3	3
3	(France) Adamson	6	6

Quarterfinals
6	(United States) Rihbany	7	6	6
3	(France) Adamson	9	3	3

==== Section 4 ====
First round
(France) Savoye	7	6
(Egypt) Greiss	5	2
(United Kingdom) Walter
10	(France) Hamelin

Second round
(France) Savoye	1	7	2
10	(France) Hamelin	6	5	6
(France) Ravoux	1	3
7	(Italy) Bossi	6	6
(France) Pannetier	3	3
15	(United Kingdom) Curry	6	6
(France) Amouretti	2	0
2	(United States) Brough	6	6

Third round
10	(France) Hamelin	4	1
7	(Italy) Bossi	6	6
15	(United Kingdom) Curry	4	9	6
2	(United States) Brough	6	7	2

Quarterfinals
7	(Italy) Bossi	6	4	6
15	(United Kingdom) Curry	3	6	3

Preceded by 1949 Australian Championships – Women's singles	Grand Slam women's singles	Succeeded by 1949 Wimbledon Championships – Women's singles
