= 1950 French Championships – Women's singles =

Women's singles
- 1950 French Championships

Final
- Champion: (United States) Doris Hart
- Runner-up: (United States) Patricia Todd
- Score: 6–4, 4–6, 6–2

Details
- Draw: 54
- Seeds: 8

Events
Singles	men	women
Doubles	men	women
← 1949 ·	French Championships	· 1951 →

Third-seeded Doris Hart defeated Patricia Todd 6–4, 4–6, 6–2 in the final to win the women's singles tennis title at the 1950 French Championships.

== Seeds ==
The seeded players are listed below. Doris Hart is the champion; others show the round in which they were eliminated.

1. (United States) Margaret duPont (quarterfinals)
2. (United States) Louise Brough (semifinals)
3. (United States) Doris Hart (champion)
4. (United States) Patricia Todd (finalist)
5. (United States) Shirley Fry (quarterfinals)
6. (Italy) Annalisa Bossi (quarterfinals)
7. (United States) Rita Anderson (third round)
8. (United Kingdom) Joan P. Curry (third round)

== Draw ==
=== Key ===
- Q = Qualifier
- WC = Wild card
- LL = Lucky loser
- r = Retired

=== Finals ===
Quarterfinals
1	(United States) Margaret duPont	6	0	2
(United States) Barbara Scofield	3	6	6
4	(United States) Patricia Todd	6	6
5	(United States) Shirley Fry	3	3
6	(Italy) Annalissa Bossi	4	2
3	(United States) Doris Hart	6	6
(United States) Betty Rosenquest	2	2
2	(United States) Louise Brough	6	6

Semifinals
(United States) Barbara Scofield	2	3
4	(United States) Patricia Todd	6	6
3	(United States) Doris Hart	6	6
2	(United States) Louise Brough	2	3

Finals
4	(United States) Patricia Todd	4	6	2
3	(United States) Doris Hart	6	4	6

=== Earlier rounds ===
==== Section 1 ====
First round
(France) Halff	6	6
(France) De La Giroday	1	4
(United Kingdom) Walter	6	6
(Italy) Migliori	2	3
(France) Taillandier	1	0
(United States) Scofield	6	6

Second round
1	(United States) duPont
(United States) Malcolm
(Turkey) Musluoğlu	6	6
(France) Hollier-Larousse	2	3
8	(United Kingdom) Curry	4	6	6
(France) Halff	6	2	2
(United Kingdom) Walter	3	2
(United States) Scofield	6	6

Third round
1	(United States) duPont	6	6
(Turkey) Musluoğlu	0	2
8	(United Kingdom) Curry	4	7	3
(United States) Scofield	6	5	6

Quarterfinals
1	(United States) duPont	3	6	6
(United States) Scofield	6	0	2

==== Section 2 ====
First round
4	(United States) Todd
(France) Marcellin
(Belgium) Van Leer
(France) Pannetier
(United Kingdom) Quelch	6	2
(Italy) Matous	8	6
(United States) Butler
(France) Foy
5	(United States) Fry	6	6
(France) Dubois	2	4
(Italy) Manfredi	6	6
(United Kingdom) Hibbert	1	0
(South Africa) Glietenberg
(France) Amouretti
(United States) Rihbany	6	6
(France) Bernard	4	3

Second round
4	(United States) Todd	6	6
(France) Pannetier	2	2
(Italy) Matous	6	6
(France) Foy	3	2
5	(United States) Fry	6	6
(Italy) Manfredi	0	2
(France) Amouretti	5	3
(United States) Rihbany	7	6

Third round
4	(United States) Todd	6	6
(Italy) Matous	2	1
5	(United States) Fry	6	6
(United States) Rihbany	1	1

Quarterfinals
4	(United States) Todd	6	6
5	(United States) Fry	3	3

==== Section 3 ====
First round
(France) Boutin
(France) Lucot
(United States) Head	6	6
(France) Ravoux	2	1
(France) Bucaille	1	6	6
(Belgium) Isaac	6	4	1
(France) Bourbonnais	5	4
6	(Italy) Bossi	7	6
(France) Varin	3	3
(Switzerland) Rigollet	6	6
(France) Patorni	4	3
(United Kingdom) Mottram	6	6
(France) Galtier	1	0
(Belgium) De Ridder	6	6
(Netherlands) Hermsen	1	0
3	(United States) Hart	6	6

Second round
(France) Boutin
(United States) Head
(France) Bucaille	3	2
6	(Italy) Bossi	6	6
(Switzerland) Rigollet	4	2
(United Kingdom) Mottram	6	6
(Belgium) De Ridder	0	3
3	(United States) Hart	6	6

Third round
(United States) Head	10	4	2
6	(Italy) Bossi	8	6	6
(United Kingdom) Mottram	1	2
3	(United States) Hart	6	6

Quarterfinals
6	(Italy) Bossi	4	2
3	(United States) Hart	6	6

==== Section 4 ====
First round
(France) Schmitt	3	2
(United States) Rosenquest	6	6
(United States) Morrison	6	4	0
(France) Jamain	4	6	6
(Switzerland) Charbonnier	6	2	6
(Italy) Tonolli	2	6	3

Second round
(United States) Rosenquest	6	6
(France) Jamain	2	2
(Switzerland) Charbonnier	2	2
(France) Seghers	6	6
7	(United States) Anderson	8	2	6
(Italy) Bologna	6	6	4
(France) Savoye	0	0
2	(United States) Brough	6	6

Third round
(United States) Rosenquest	7	6
(France) Seghers	5	0
7	(United States) Anderson	0	7	4
2	(United States) Brough	6	5	6

Quarterfinals
(United States) Rosenquest	6	6
2	(United States) Brough	2	2

Preceded by 1950 Australian Championships – Women's singles	Grand Slam women's singles	Succeeded by 1950 Wimbledon Championships – Women's singles
