= 1947 French Championships – Women's singles =

Women's singles
- 1947 French Championships

Final
- Champion: (United States) Patricia Todd
- Runner-up: (United States) Doris Hart
- Score: 6–3, 3–6, 6–4

Details
- Draw: 38
- Seeds: 16

Events
| Singles | men | women |
| Doubles | men | women |
| ← 1946 · | French Championships | · 1948 → |

Fifth-seeded Patricia Todd defeated Doris Hart 6–3, 3–6, 6–4 in the final to win the women's singles tennis title at the 1947 French Championships.

== Seeds ==
The seeded players are listed below. Patricia Todd is the champion; others show the round in which they were eliminated.

1. (United States) Margaret Osborne (semifinals)
2. (United States) Doris Hart (finalist)
3. (United States) Louise Brough (semifinals)
4. (France) Nelly Landry (second round)
5. (United States) Patricia Todd (champion)
6. (South Africa) Sheila Piercey (quarterfinals)
7. (Romania) Magda Rurac (quarterfinals)
8. (Hungary) Zsuzsi Körmöczy (quarterfinals)
9. (Czechoslovakia) Helena Straubeova (third round)
10. (Poland) Jadwiga Jędrzejowska (third round)
11. (Luxembourg) Alice Weiwers (third round)
12. (France) Anne-Marie Seghers (third round)
13. (Belgium) Miriamme De Borman (third round)
14. (Hungary) Márta Peterdy (third round)
15. (Italy) Annalisa Bossi (third round)
16. (South Africa) Dorothy Muller (third round)

== Draw ==
=== Key ===
- Q = Qualifier
- WC = Wild card
- LL = Lucky loser
- r = Retired

=== Finals ===
Quarterfinals
1 | (United States) Margaret Osborne | 6 | 6
8 | (Hungary) Zsuzsi Körmöczy | 0 | 3
(Italy) Lucia Manfredi | 1 | 4
5 | (United States) Patricia Todd | 6 | 6
6 | (South Africa) Sheila Piercey | 1 | 0
3 | (United States) Louise Brough | 6 | 6
7 | (Romania) Magda Rurac | 3 | 4
2 | (United States) Doris Hart | 6 | 6

Semifinals
1 | (United States) Margaret Osborne | 6 | 3 | 4
5 | (United States) Patricia Todd | 2 | 6 | 6
3 | (United States) Louise Brough | 2 | 5
2 | (United States) Doris Hart | 6 | 7

Finals
5 | (United States) Patricia Todd | 6 | 3 | 6
2 | (United States) Doris Hart | 3 | 6 | 4

=== Earlier rounds ===
==== Section 1 ====
First round

Second round
1 | (United States) Osborne | 6 | 6
(France) Inglebert | 2 | 3
16 | (South Africa) Muller | 6 | 6
(United Kingdom) Gannon | 0 | 3
(Czechoslovakia) Sutz | 3 | 4
8 | (Hungary) Körmöczy | 6 | 6
(Netherlands) Van Der Wall | 4 | 4
9 | (Czechoslovakia) Straubeová | 6 | 6

Third round
1 | (United States) Osborne | 6 | 4 | 6
16 | (South Africa) Muller | 0 | 6 | 3
8 | (Hungary) Körmöczy | 6 | 4 | 6
9 | (Czechoslovakia) Straubeová | 1 | 6 | 3

Quarterfinals
1 | (United States) Osborne | 6 | 6
8 | (Hungary) Körmöczy | 0 | 3

==== Section 2 ====
First round
(France) Varin | 6 | 6
(France) Poncelet | 3 | 1
12 | (France) Seghers | 6 | 6
(France) Foy | 1 | 0
(France) Noyon | 2 | 4
(France) Boegner | 6 | 6

Second round
4 | (France) Landry
(Italy) Manfredi
(United Kingdom) Carris | 6 | 0 | 1
13 | (Belgium) De Borman | 3 | 6 | 6
5 | (United States) Todd | 6 | 6
(France) Varin | 2 | 2
12 | (France) Seghers | 6 | 2
(France) Boegner | 3 | 3 | r

Third round
(Italy) Manfredi | 6 | 1 | 6
13 | (Belgium) De Borman | 2 | 6 | 0
5 | (United States) Todd | 6 | 6
12 | (France) Seghers | 1 | 0

Quarterfinals
(Italy) Manfredi | 1 | 4
5 | (United States) Todd | 6 | 6

==== Section 3 ====
First round
11 | (Luxembourg) Weiwers | 6 | 6
(France) Hamelin | 1 | 1
(France) Claude | 6 | 6
(France) Brunnarius | 2 | 2
(France) Marcellin | 6 | 2 | 3
(France) Jucker | 2 | 6 | 6

Second round
11 | (Luxembourg) Weiwers | 6 | 6
(France) Claude | 2 | 3
(France) Jucker | 2 | 1
6 | (South Africa) Piercey | 6 | 6
(Netherlands) Hermsen | 6 | 3
14 | (Hungary) Peterdy | 8 | 6
(France) Charpenel | 3 | 4
3 | (United States) Brough | 6 | 6

Third round
11 | (Luxembourg) Weiwers | 6 | 3 | 0
6 | (South Africa) Piercey | 2 | 6 | 6
14 | (Hungary) Peterdy | 1 | 6 | 4
3 | (United States) Brough | 6 | 4 | 6

Quarterfinals
6 | (South Africa) Piercey | 1 | 0
3 | (United States) Brough | 6 | 6

==== Section 4 ====
First round

Second round
10 | (Poland) Jędrzejowska | 6 | 6
(United Kingdom) Quertier | 3 | 4
(United States) Butler | 1 | 2
7 | (Romania) Rurac | 6 | 6
15 | (Italy) Bossi | 6 | 6
(Netherlands) Couquerque | 1 | 2
(France) Patorni | 6 | 0 | 4
2 | (United States) Hart | 4 | 6 | 6

Third round
10 | (Poland) Jędrzejowska | 7 | 5 | 4
7 | (Romania) Rurac | 5 | 7 | 6
15 | (Italy) Bossi | 5 | 6 | 3
2 | (United States) Hart | 7 | 3 | 6

Quarterfinals
7 | (Romania) Rurac | 3 | 4
2 | (United States) Hart | 6 | 6

| Preceded by 1947 Australian Championships – Women's singles | Grand Slam women's singles | Succeeded by 1947 Wimbledon Championships – Women's singles |
