= 1948 French Championships – Women's singles =

Women's singles
- 1948 French Championships

Final
- Champion: (France) Nelly Landry
- Runner-up: (United States) Shirley Fry
- Score: 6–2, 0–6, 6–0

Details
- Draw: 50
- Seeds: 16

Events
Singles	men	women
Doubles	men	women
← 1947 ·	French Championships	· 1949 →

Third-seeded Nelly Landry defeated Shirley Fry 6–2, 0–6, 6–0 in the final to win the women's singles tennis title at the 1948 French Championships.

== Seeds ==
The seeded players are listed below. Nelly Landry is the champion; others show the round in which they were eliminated.

1. (United States) Doris Hart (semifinals)
2. (United States) Patricia Todd (semifinals)
3. (France) Nelly Landry (champion)
4. (United States) Shirley Fry (finalist)
5. (Hungary) Zsuzsi Körmöczy (second round)
6. (United States) Mary Prentiss (quarterfinals)
7. (Italy) Annalisa Bossi (quarterfinals)
8. (United States) Helen Rihbany (quarterfinals)
9. (France) Colette Boegner (third round)
10. (Hungary) Márta Peterdy (third round)
11. (Belgium) Miriamme De Borman (third round)
12. (France) Jacqueline Patorni (third round)
13. (Luxembourg) Alice Weiwers (second round)
14. (United Kingdom) Bea Carris (third round)
15. (France) Arlette Halff (third round)
16. (France) Jaqueline Boutin (third round)

== Draw ==
=== Key ===
- Q = Qualifier
- WC = Wild card
- LL = Lucky loser
- r = Retired

=== Finals ===
Quarterfinals
1	(United States) Doris Hart	6	6
8	(United States) Helen Rihbany	3	3
4	(United States) Shirley Fry	6	7
(Argentina) Maria Weiss	3	5
6	(United States) Mary Prentiss	4	3
3	(France) Nelly Landry	6	6
7	(Italy) Annalissa Bossi
2	(United States) Patricia Todd

Semifinals
1	(United States) Doris Hart	3	6	9
4	(United States) Shirley Fry	6	4	11
3	(France) Nelly Landry
2	(United States) Patricia Todd

Finals
4	(United States) Shirley Fry	2	6	0
3	(France) Nelly Landry	6	0	6

=== Earlier rounds ===
==== Section 1 ====
First round
(Italy) Migliori	2	4
9	(France) Boegner	6	6

Second round
1	(United States) Hart	6	8
(France) Marcellin	4	6
16	(France) Boutin	2	6	6
(France) Poncelet	6	3	4
8	(United States) Rihbany	8	6
(United Kingdom) Bocquet	6	2
(Netherlands) Hermsen	1	4
9	(France) Boegner	6	6

Third round
1	(United States) Hart	6	6
16	(France) Boutin	1	1
8	(United States) Rihbany	2	7	6
9	(France) Boegner	6	5	2

Quarterfinals
1	(United States) Hart	6	6
8	(United States) Rihbany	3	3

==== Section 2 ====
First round
4	(United States) Fry	2	7	6
(Austria) Doleschell	6	5	1
(France) Barbier
(France) Brunnarius
(Belgium) De Ridder	0	2
13	(Luxembourg) Weiwers	6	6
(United Kingdom) Middleton	4	6	8
(France) Henry	6	3	6
5	(Hungary) Körmöczy	6	6
(Netherlands) Van Der Wall	2	4
(Argentina) Weiss	6	6
(France) Hamelin	2	4
(France) Jamain	3	2
(Italy) Bologna	6	6
(France) Fritz	2	8	2
12	(France) Patorni	6	6	6

Second round
4	(United States) Fry	6	6
(France) Brunnarius	4	3
13	(Luxembourg) Weiwers	6	2	2
(United Kingdom) Middleton	4	6	6
5	(Hungary) Körmöczy	4	5
(Argentina) Weiss	6	7
(Italy) Bologna	1	3
12	(France) Patorni	6	6

Third round
4	(United States) Fry	6	6
(United Kingdom) Middleton	3	0
(Argentina) Weiss	6	6
12	(France) Patorni	4	1

Quarterfinals
4	(United States) Fry	6	7
(Argentina) Weiss	3	5

==== Section 3 ====
First round
(France) Bernard	0	2
(France) Amouretti	6	6
(United States) Butler	6	1	4
11	(Belgium) De Borman	4	6	6
(France) Pannetier	2	1
(United States) Scofield	6	6
(France) Seghers	1	4
6	(United States) Prentiss	6	6
(France) Claude	6	7	5
14	(United Kingdom) Carris	3	9	7
(France) Varin	6	6
(Switzerland) Studer	4	2
(France) Jucker	6	6
(United States) Rice	2	3
(France) Ravoux	1	2
3	(France) Landry	6	6

Second round
(France) Amouretti	3	6	7
11	(Belgium) De Borman	6	3	9
(United States) Scofield	3	6	3
6	(United States) Prentiss	6	1	6
14	(United Kingdom) Carris	3	6	12
(France) Varin	6	4	10
(France) Jucker	6	5	5
3	(France) Landry	2	7	7

Third round
11	(Belgium) De Borman	2	1
6	(United States) Prentiss	6	6
14	(United Kingdom) Carris	0	2
3	(France) Landry	6	6

Quarterfinals
6	(United States) Prentiss	4	3
3	(France) Landry	6	6

==== Section 4 ====
First round
(Poland) Jędrzejowska
10	(Hungary) Peterdy

Second round
10	(Hungary) Peterdy
(France) Savoye
(France) Foy	2	1
7	(Italy) Bossi	6	6
15	(France) Halff	6	7
(United Kingdom) Mac Kelvie	3	5
(Netherlands) Borren	2	0
2	(United States) Todd	6	6

Third round
10	(Hungary) Peterdy	7	8	3
7	(Italy) Bossi	9	6	6
15	(France) Halff	1	1
2	(United States) Todd	6	6

Quarterfinals
7	(Italy) Bossi
2	(United States) Todd

Preceded by 1948 Australian Championships – Women's singles	Grand Slam women's singles	Succeeded by 1948 Wimbledon Championships – Women's singles
