= Nancy Morrison =

American tennis player (1927–2015)

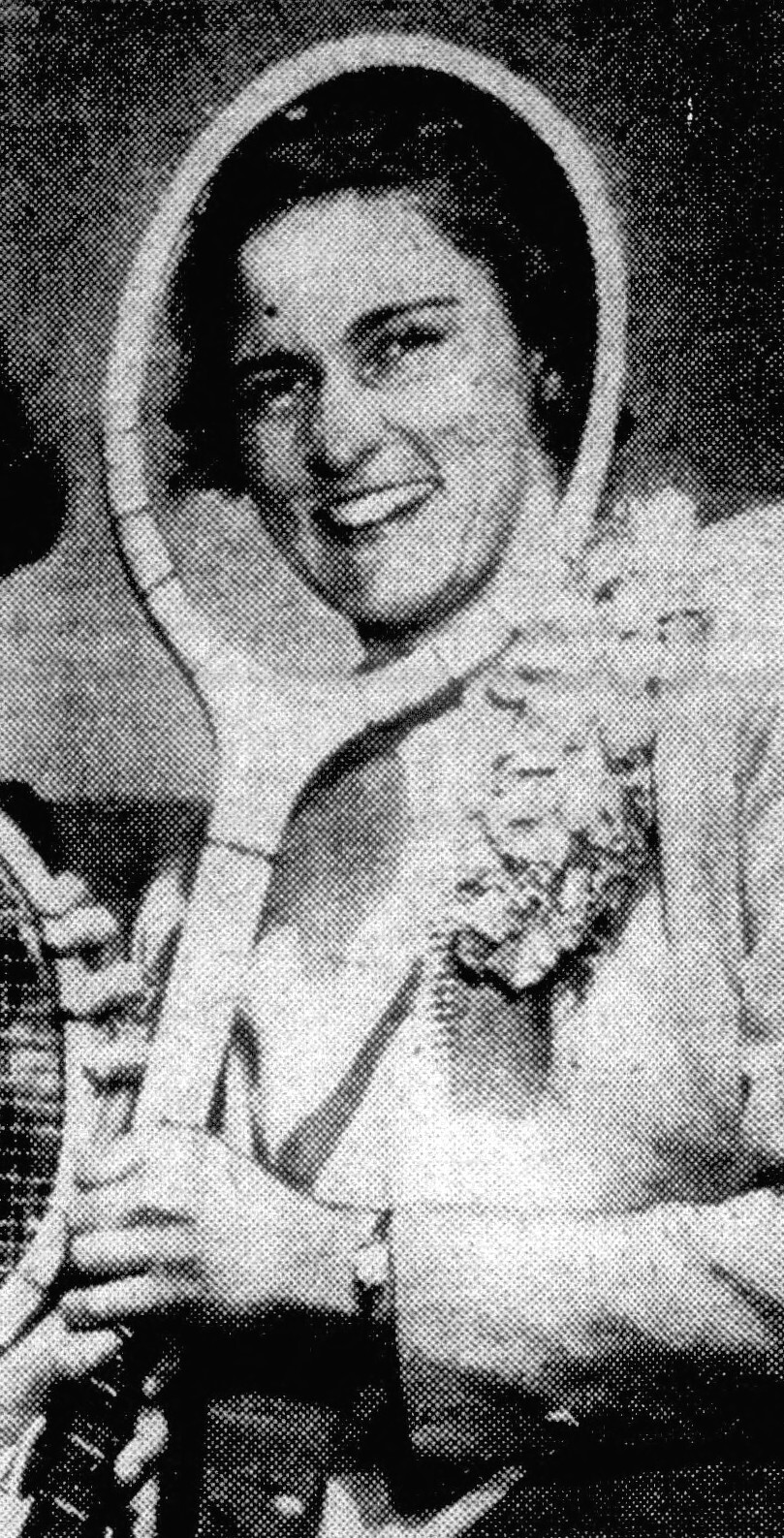
- Morrison, circa 1950
- Full name: Nancy Morrison Orthwein
- Country (sports): United States
- Born: June 21, 1927; Washington D.C.
- Died: August 8, 2015 (aged 88); West Palm Beach, Florida
- Plays: Right-handed

Singles

Grand Slam singles results
- French Open: 1R (1950)
- Wimbledon: 2R (1950)
- US Open: 3R (1946, 1950)

Nancy Morrison Orthwein (June 21, 1927 – August 8, 2015) was an American tennis player.

Morrison, raised in Palm Beach, Florida, was the granddaughter of William Harley DaCamara, who was founder and president of Palm Beach Mercantile Company. She was born in Washington D.C and had two brothers.

A collegiate tennis player for Rollins College, Morrison won the 1948 Eastern Intercollegiate singles title. In 1950 she took part in the Wimbledon Championships for the only time and in the same tour finished runner-up to Gussie Moran at the Kent Championships. She twice reached the singles third round of the U.S. National Championships. Her doubles partnership with Barbara Scofield ranked as high as fourth in the United States.

Morrison was the second wife of business executive Adolphus Busch Orthwein.
