= 1947 French Championships (tennis) =

- Date: 14–27 July 1947
- Edition: 46
- Category: 17th Grand Slam
- Surface: Clay
- Location: Paris (XVI^{e}), France
- Venue: Stade Roland Garros

Champions

Men's singles
- (Hungary) József Asbóth

Women's singles
- (United States) Patricia Todd

Men's doubles
- (South Africa) Eustace Fannin / (South Africa) Eric Sturgess

Women's doubles
- (United States) Louise Brough / (United States) Margaret Osborne duPont

Mixed doubles
- (South Africa) Sheila Piercey Summers / (South Africa) Eric Sturgess

Boys' singles
- (Belgium) Jacques Brichant
← 1946 ·	French Championships	· 1948 →

The 1947 French Championships (now known as the French Open) was a tennis tournament that took place on the outdoor clay courts at the Stade Roland-Garros in Paris, France. The tournament ran from 14 July until 27 July. It was the 51st staging of the French Championships. In 1947 (as in 1946) the French Championships were held after Wimbledon. They were thus, both, the third Grand Slam tennis event of the year and 1947 was the last tournament until the 2020 French Open to be held outside of the usual May–June schedule. József Asbóth and Patricia Todd won the singles titles.

== Finals ==
=== Seniors ===
==== Men's singles ====
(Hungary) József Asbóth defeated (South Africa) Eric Sturgess, 8–6, 7–5, 6–4

==== Women's singles ====
(United States) Patricia Todd defeated (United States) Doris Hart, 6–3, 3–6, 6–4

==== Men's doubles ====
(South Africa) Eustace Fannin / (South Africa) Eric Sturgess defeated (United States) Tom Brown / (Australia) Bill Sidwell, 6–4, 4–6, 6–4, 6–3

==== Women's doubles ====
(United States) Louise Brough / (United States) Margaret Osborne defeated (United States) Doris Hart / (United States) Patricia Todd, 7–5, 6–2

==== Mixed doubles ====
(South Africa) Sheila Piercey Summers / (South Africa) Eric Sturgess defeated (Poland) Jadwiga Jędrzejowska / (Romania) Cristea Caralulis, 6–0, 6–0

=== Juniors ===
==== Boys' singles ====
(Belgium) Jacques Brichant defeated (United Kingdom) Alan Roberts, 6–3, 4–6, 7–5

Preceded by 1947 Wimbledon Championships	Grand Slams	Succeeded by 1947 U.S. National Championships
