= Mary Arnold (tennis) =

American tennis player (1916–1975)

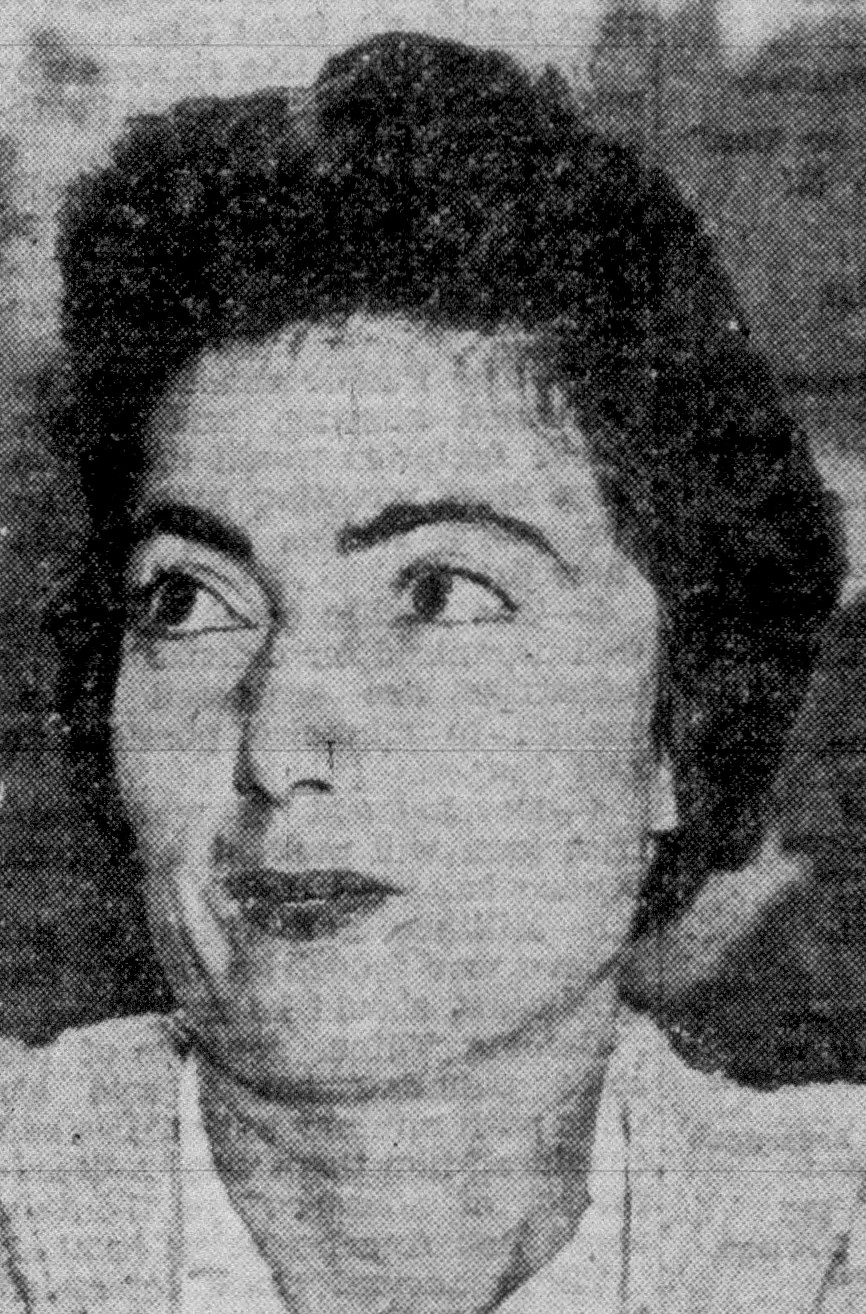
- Arnold, circa 1942
- Full name: Mary Arnold Prentiss
- Country (sports): United States
- Born: October 26, 1916
- Died: January 26, 1975 (aged 58) Twin Falls, Idaho, United States

Singles

Grand Slam singles results
- French Open: QF (1948)
- Wimbledon: 3R (1948)
- US Open: SF (1946)

Doubles

Grand Slam doubles results
- French Open: Final (1948)
- Wimbledon: 3R (1948)
- US Open: Final (1946)

Grand Slam mixed doubles results
- French Open: QF (1948)
- Wimbledon: QF (1948)
- US Open: SF (1944)

Mary Arnold Prentiss (née Arnold; October 26, 1916 – January 26, 1975) was an amateur American adult tennis player from September 1934 through May 1968. She also participated in United States National Seniors Championships through 1972.

She was educated at the Los Angeles City College where she became a member of the Los Angeles Olympia L.T.C.

She participated in the 1939 Wightman Cup, the women's team tennis competition between the United States and Great Britain. She won a doubles match partnering with Dorothy Bundy Cheney and helped the U.S. team to a 5–2 victory. She was coached by Eleanor Tennant from 1939 through 1941.

Arnold was ranked in the U.S. Top 10 from 1939 through 1947. Her highest ranking was fifth in both 1942 and 1944.

At the 1948 French Championships, she paired with future International Tennis Hall of Fame inductee Shirley Fry to reach the women's doubles final. She also played at the Wimbledon Championships that year and reached the third round in singles and women's doubles and the quarterfinals in mixed doubles.

At the Tri-State Tennis Tournament, she reached five finals, winning three doubles titles: 1940, 1944 and 1946. She also was a singles finalist in 1941 (losing to Pauline Betz), and was a women's doubles finalist in 1945 (with Fry). Her women's doubles titles there were in partnership with Alice Marble in 1940, Dorothy Bundy Cheney in 1944, and Fry in 1946.

== Grand Slam finals ==
=== Doubles (2 runner-ups) ===
Result	Year	Championship	Surface	Partner	Opponents	Score
Loss	1946	U.S. Championships	Grass	(United States) Patricia Canning Todd	(United States) Louise Brough (United States) Margaret Osborne duPont	1–6, 3–6
Loss	1948	French Championships	Clay	(United States) Shirley Fry	(United States) Patricia Canning Todd (United States) Doris Hart	4–6, 2–6
