= 1950 U.S. National Championships – Women's singles =

Women's singles
- 1950 U.S. National Championships

Final
- Champion: (United States) Margaret Osborne duPont
- Runner-up: (United States) Doris Hart
- Score: 6–3, 6–3

Details
- Draw: 49
- Seeds: 6

Events
Singles	men	women
Doubles	men	women
- U.S. National Championships

First-seeded Margaret Osborne duPont defeated Doris Hart 6–3, 6–3 in the final to win the women's singles tennis title at the 1950 U.S. National Championships.

== Seeds ==
The six seeded U.S. players are listed below. Margaret Osborne duPont is the champion; others show in brackets the round in which they were eliminated.

1. (United States) Margaret Osborne duPont (champion)
2. (United States) Doris Hart (finalist)
3. (United States) Louise Brough (third round)
4. (United States) Beverly Baker (semifinals)
5. (United States) Pat Canning Todd (quarterfinals)
6. (United States) Shirley Fry (quarterfinals)

== Draw ==
=== Key ===
- Q = Qualifier
- WC = Wild card
- LL = Lucky loser
- r = Retired

=== Final eight ===
Quarterfinals
1	(United States) Margaret Osborne duPont	6	6
5	(United States) Pat Canning Todd	4	1
(United States) Nancy Chaffee	6	6
(United States) Barbara Scofield	2	2
2	(United States) Doris Hart	6	6
6	(United States) Shirley Fry	4	4
4	(United States) Beverly Baker	6	9
(United States) Betty Rosenquest	2	7

Semifinals
1	(United States) Margaret Osborne duPont	6	1	6
(United States) Nancy Chaffee	1	6	0
2	(United States) Doris Hart	6	6
4	(United States) Beverly Baker	4	1

Finals
1	(United States) Margaret Osborne duPont	6	6
4	(United States) Doris Hart	3	3

Preceded by 1950 Wimbledon Championships – Women's singles	Grand Slam women's singles	Succeeded by 1951 Australian Championships – Women's singles
