= 1948 French Championships (tennis) =

- Date: 19–30 May 1948
- Edition: 47
- Category: 18th Grand Slam (ITF)
- Surface: Clay
- Location: Paris (XVI^{e}), France
- Venue: Stade Roland Garros

Champions

Men's singles
- (United States) Frank Parker

Women's singles
- (France) Nelly Landry

Men's doubles
- (Sweden) Lennart Bergelin / (Egypt) Jaroslav Drobný

Women's doubles
- (United States) Doris Hart / (United States) Pat Canning Todd

Mixed doubles
- (United States) Pat Canning Todd / (Egypt) Jaroslav Drobný
| ← 1947 · | French Championships | · 1949 → |

The 1948 French Championships (now known as the French Open) was a tennis tournament that took place on the outdoor clay courts at the Stade Roland-Garros in Paris, France. The tournament ran from 19 May until 30 May. It was the 52nd staging of the French Championships, and the second Grand Slam tennis event of 1948. Frank Parker and Nelly Landry won the singles titles.

== Finals ==
=== Men's singles ===
(United States) Frank Parker defeated (Egypt) Jaroslav Drobný 6–4, 7–5, 5–7, 8–6

=== Women's singles ===
(France) Nelly Landry defeated (United States) Shirley Fry 6–2, 0–6, 6–0

=== Men's doubles ===
(Sweden) Lennart Bergelin / (Egypt) Jaroslav Drobný defeated (Australia) Harry Hopman / (Australia) Frank Sedgman 8–6, 6–1, 12–10

=== Women's doubles ===
(United States) Doris Hart / (United States) Pat Canning Todd defeated (United States) Shirley Fry / (United States) Mary Arnold Prentiss 6–4, 6–2

=== Mixed doubles ===
(United States) Pat Canning Todd / (Egypt) Jaroslav Drobný defeated (United States) Doris Hart / (Australia) Frank Sedgman 6–3, 3–6, 6–3

| Preceded by 1948 Australian Championships | Grand Slams | Succeeded by 1948 Wimbledon Championships |
