= Barbara Scofield =

American tennis player (1926–2023)

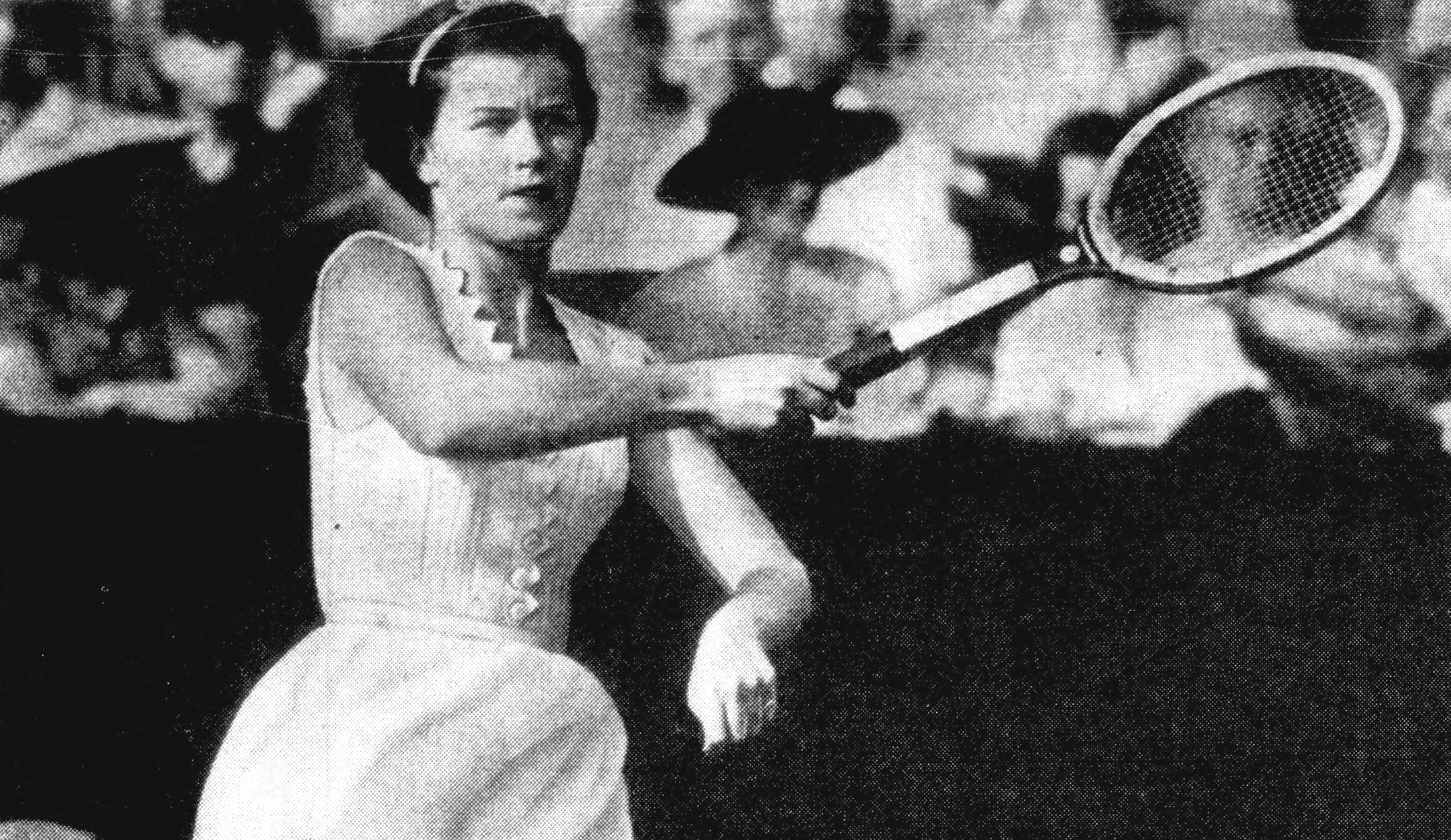
- Scofield in 1950
- Full name: Barbara Scofield-Davidson
- Country (sports): United States
- Born: June 24, 1926; San Francisco, California, U.S.
- Died: January 31, 2023 (aged 96)
- Plays: Right-handed

Singles
- Highest ranking: No. 5 (1950, John Olliff)

Grand Slam singles results
- French Open: SF (1950)
- Wimbledon: QF (1950)
- US Open: QF (1949)

Doubles

Grand Slam doubles results
- French Open: F (1951)
- Wimbledon: SF (1948, 1951)

Grand Slam mixed doubles results
- French Open: W (1950)
- Wimbledon: QF (1950)

Barbara Scofield (June 24, 1926 – January 31, 2023) was an American tennis player who was active from the late 1940s until the early 1960s.

== Tennis career ==
Scofield learned playing tennis at age 11 by taking lesson at the Golden Gate Park.

With the Argentine Enrique Morea, Scofield won the mixed doubles at the French Championships in 1950, and the following year, she was a runner-up in the women's doubles event with Beryl Bartlett.

Scofield's best singles result at a Grand Slam tournament was reaching the semifinal of the 1950 French Championships where she lost to fourth-seeded Patricia Todd. In the quarterfinal Scofield had caused an upset by defeating the defending champion and world No. 1 Margaret duPont in three sets. As an unseeded player Scofield reached the singles quarterfinals of the 1949 U.S. National Championships and the 1950 Wimbledon Championships, in both cases losing to third-seeded Doris Hart. In the Wimbledon doubles event, she reached the semifinals in 1948 and 1951, partnering Helen Rihbany and Betty Rosenquest respectively.

In May 1950 Scofield won the singles title at the Wiesbaden International after a successful comeback in the final against Gussie Moran. In July that year she beat Georgie Woodgate to win the singles title of the Welsh Championships. In 1953 Scofield won the singles title at the Swiss International Championships after a three-sets win in the final against Maria de Riba. She won the singles title at the 1955 Eastern Grass Court Championships in South Orange, New Jersey, defeating Barbara Breit in the final.

Scofield was inducted into ITA Women's Collegiate Tennis Hall of Fame in 2004. She was inducted into the United States Tennis Association Hall of Fame in 2013.

== Personal life ==
Scofield married Gordon Davidson, a Yale graduate from Milwaukee, in April 1951 in Tangier. Scofield died on January 31, 2023, at the age of 96.

== Grand Slam finals ==
=== Doubles: (1 runner-up) ===
Result	Year	Championship	Surface	Partner	Opponents	Score
Loss	1951	French Championships	Clay	(South Africa) Beryl Bartlett	(United States) Shirley Fry (United States) Doris Hart	8–10, 3–6

=== Mixed doubles: (1 title) ===
Result	Year	Championship	Surface	Partner	Opponents	Score
Win	1950	French Championships	Clay	(Argentina) Enrique Morea	(United States) Patricia Canning Todd (United States) Bill Talbert	Walkover

== Grand Slam singles tournament timeline ==
Key
W	F	SF	QF	#R	RR	Q#	DNQ	A	NH

(W) winner; (F) finalist; (SF) semifinalist; (QF) quarterfinalist; (#R) rounds 4, 3, 2, 1; (RR) round-robin stage; (Q#) qualification round; (DNQ) did not qualify; (A) absent; (NH) not held; (SR) strike rate (events won / competed); (W–L) win–loss record.

Tournament	1948	1949	1950	1951	1952	1953	1954	1955	1956	1957	1958	1959	1960	1961	Career SR
Australian Championships	A	A	A	A	A	A	A	A	A	A	A	A	A	A	0 / 0
French Championships	2R	A	SF	2R	A	A	A	A	2R	A	A	A	A	1R	0 / 5
Wimbledon	2R	A	QF	4R	A	2R	A	1R	3R	A	A	A	A	A	0 / 6
US Championships	A	A	A	A	A	A	A	A	A	2R	A	A	A	A	0 / 1
SR	0 / 2	0 / 0	0 / 2	0 / 2	0 / 0	0 / 1	0 / 0	0 / 1	0 / 2	0 / 1	0 / 0	0 / 0	0 / 0	0 / 1	0 / 8
