= Helena Matouš =

- Country (sports): Czechoslovakia; Italy
- Born: 1921 Plzeň, Czechoslovakia

Singles

Grand Slam singles results
- French Open: 3R (1946, 1947, 1950)
- Wimbledon: 4R (1951)

Doubles

Grand Slam doubles results
- French Open: QF (1950)
- Wimbledon: 1R (1949, 1950, 1951, 1952)

Grand Slam mixed doubles results
- Wimbledon: 4R (1949)

Helena Matouš (Czech: Matoušová; née Štraubeová; born 1921) is a Czech-Italian former tennis player. Born in Plzeň, Matouš was active during the 1940s and 1950s. She married tennis player and ice hockey international Milan Matouš.

In 1948, following the communist takeover, she was one of four Czechoslovak players who were reported missing while on a tennis tour of Italy. Two members of the group, Jaroslav Drobný and Vladimír Černík, ended up returning to Prague before defecting for good a year later, while Matouš and future husband Milan Matouš stayed in Italy.

Matouš was a singles runner-up at the 1949 Welsh Championships, reached the women's doubles quarter-finals of the 1950 French Championships and made the singles fourth round of the 1951 Wimbledon Championships.

Settling in the ski resort of Cortina d'Ampezzo, Matouš and her husband had a child Elena who was a national champion in alpine skiing. Her son in law Fausto Radici was an Olympic skier.
