= Mary Terán de Weiss =

Argentine tennis player

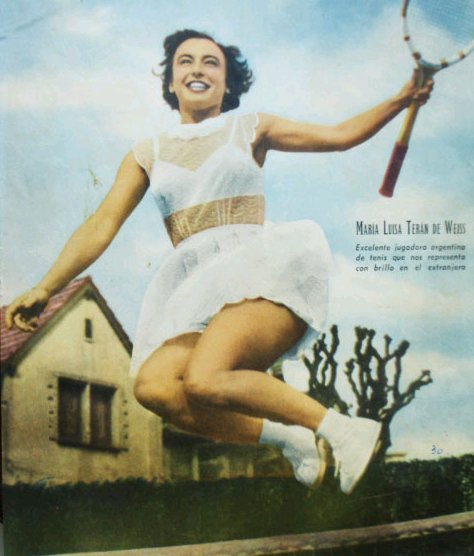
- Full name: María Luisa Terán de Weiss
- Country (sports): Argentina
- Born: 29 January 1918 Rosario, Argentina
- Died: 8 December 1984 (aged 66) Mar del Plata, Argentina
- Turned pro: 1937 (amateur)
- Retired: 1959

Singles
- Career record: 162-85 (65%)
- Career titles: 32
- Highest ranking: No. 10 (1950)

Grand Slam singles results
- French Open: QF (1948, 1952)
- Wimbledon: 4R (1950)

Doubles

Grand Slam doubles results
- Wimbledon: 3R (1953)

Mixed doubles

Grand Slam mixed doubles results
- Wimbledon: 4R (1949)
Medal record
Pan American Games
Gold medal – first place	1951 Buenos Aires	Women's Singles
Gold medal – first place	1951 Buenos Aires	Women's Doubles
Bronze medal – third place	1951 Buenos Aires	Mixed Doubles

María Luisa Terán de Weiss (29 January 1918 – 8 December 1984), known in Argentina as Mary Terán de Weiss, and out of Argentina as María Teran Weiss, was a tennis player, the first Argentine woman to have a relevant sport performance in the international tennis tour.

== Tennis career ==
She played between 1937 and 1959, and was considered a top 20 player, winning the Irish Championships (1950), Israel International (1950), Cologne International (1951), Baden Baden International (1951) and Welsh Championships (1954), and several times the River Plate Championships. In 1948, she reached quarterfinals at the French Open and won the All England Plate, a tennis competition held at the Wimbledon Championships that consisted of players who were defeated in the first or second rounds of the singles competition. She also won two gold and bronze medals at the 1951 Pan American Games.

== Political persecution in Argentina ==
Mary Terán was persecuted by the military dictatorship, which came to power in 1955, because of her sympathy and identification with the Peronist Movement, forcing her into exile in Spain and Uruguay and to retire from tennis at the end of the 1950s, and excluding her from all recognition by the press and sport organizations.

Until the 1980s, Argentina's tennis was a sport for the upper classes. Mary Terán confronted the leaders of the Argentine Tennis Association, with the goal of promoting tennis among common people. In the early 1980s, she organized a campaign to support Guillermo Vilas and help to spread tennis in the country when the Argentine Tennis Association was campaigning against Vilas.

== Death and legacy ==
After the return of democracy to Argentina at the end of 1983, she continued to be ignored by the media and the government. A few months later, she committed suicide by jumping from the seventh floor of a building in the city of Mar del Plata at the age of 66.

In 2007, the City of Buenos Aires honoured her by naming the new tennis stadium of the city Estadio Mary Terán de Weiss.

== Personal life ==
She was married to fellow tennis player Heraldo Weiss. He died in 1952.

== See also ==
- Sports in Argentina
- Tennis in Argentina
- Peronismo

== Sources ==
=== Books ===
- Lupo, Víctor F. (2004). Historia política del deporte argentino, Buenos Aires: Corregidor, capítulo XXXIV (in Spanish)
