= Josette Amouretti =

French tennis player (1914–1990)

- Full name: Josette Suzanne Marie Marguerite Astraud
- Country (sports): France
- Born: 5 March 1914; Gouise, France
- Died: 5 September 1990; Saint-Nom-la-Bretèche, France
- Turned pro: 1942
- Retired: 1958

Singles
- Career record: 5–11 (31.3%)

Grand Slam singles results
- Wimbledon: 3R (1950)

Doubles
- Career record: 10–8 (55.6%)

Josette Amouretti (5 March 1914 − 5 September 1990) is a former French tennis player. Josette emerged as runners-up in the South of France Championships in 1950, which is also her career achievement in tennis. She also represented France in her only Wimbledon appearance during the 1950 Wimbledon Championships, where she couldn't qualify beyond the 3rd round.

She was also the quarter-finalist in the women's singles at the 1954 French Championships.
