= Nancy Chaffee =

American tennis player

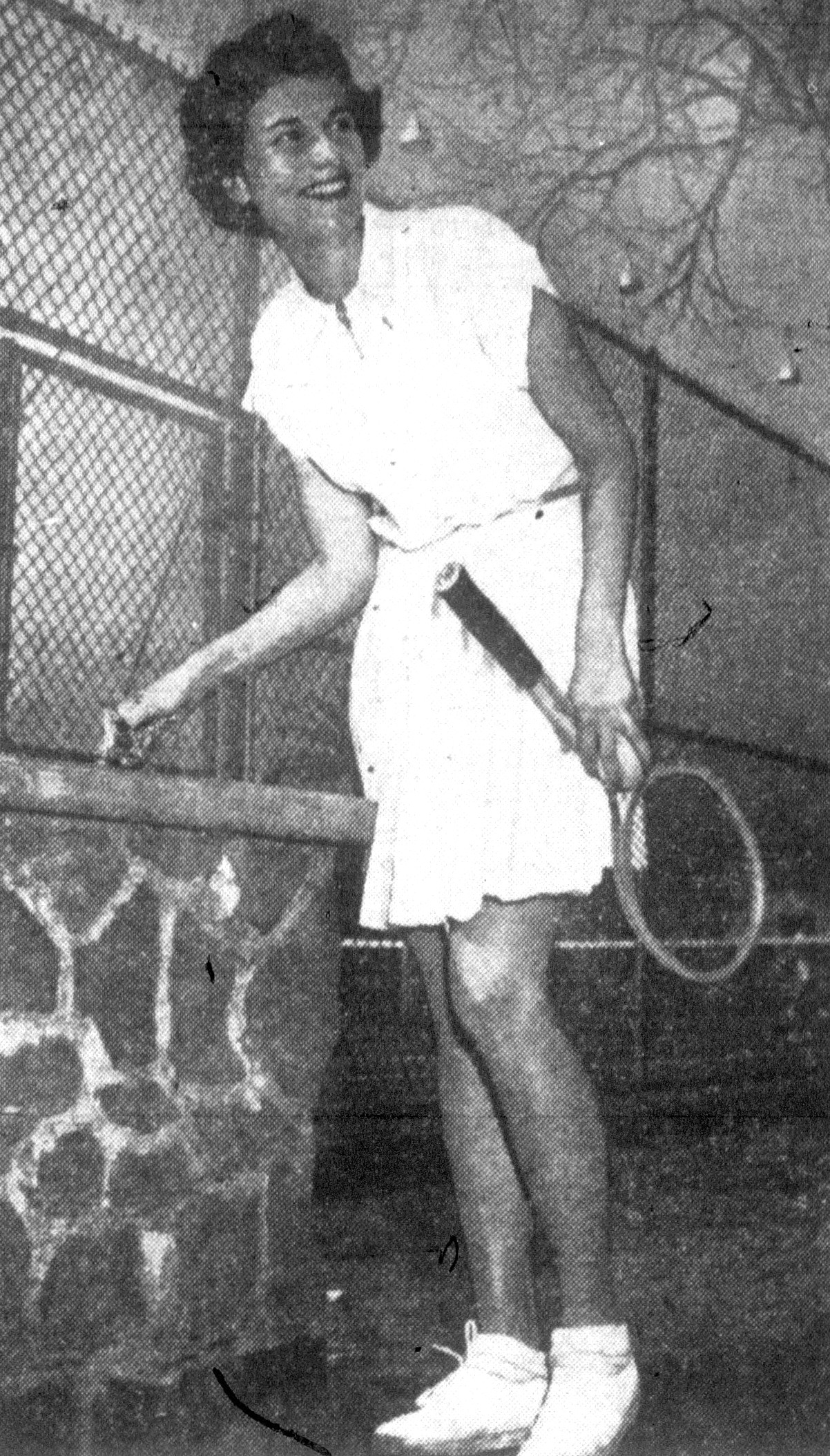
- Chaffee, circa 1950
- Full name: Nancy Chaffee Whitaker
- Country (sports): United States
- Born: March 6, 1929 Ventura, California, United States
- Died: August 11, 2002 (aged 73) Coronado, California, United States
- Retired: 1956
- Plays: Right-handed

Singles
- Highest ranking: No. 4 (1951)

Grand Slam singles results
- Wimbledon: 4R (1950)
- US Open: SF (1950)

Doubles

Grand Slam doubles results
- US Open: F (1951)

Nancy Chaffee Whitaker (March 6, 1929 – August 11, 2002) was an American female tennis player who was active in the 1950s.

Chaffee won the national girls' 18-and-under title in 1947. She won the U.S. Indoor National Championships, played at the Seventh Regiment Armory in Manhattan, from 1950 through 1952, defeating Althea Gibson, Beverly Baker, and Patricia Canning Todd in the finals. Chaffee reached the singles semifinals of the 1950 U.S. National Championships as an unseeded player but was beaten in three sets by first-seeded and eventual champion Margaret Osborne. She was ranked a career-high world No. 4 at the end of 1951.

Her best performance at a Grand Slam tournament was reaching the women's doubles final with Canning Todd at the 1951 U.S. National Championships, where they were defeated in straight sets by Shirley Fry and Doris Hart. At the 1951 Wightman Cup, she won her doubles match as the U.S. defeated Great Britain 6–1.

On October 13, 1951, she married baseball star Ralph Kiner with whom she had three children. After her marriage, which ended in divorce in 1968, she only occasionally played competitive tennis. She married sportscaster Jack Whitaker in 1991.

Chaffee became a sports commentator for ABC, developed tennis programs at resorts, and in 1992, co-founded the Cartier tennis tournament in Long Island's East Hampton, an amateur mixed-doubles fund-raising event to benefit the American Cancer Society. She died on August 11, 2002, from complications of cancer.

== Grand Slam finals ==
=== Doubles ===
Result	Year	Championship	Surface	Partner	Opponents	Score
Loss	1951	U.S. Championships	Grass	(United States) Patricia Todd	(United States) Shirley Fry (United States) Doris Hart	4–6, 2–6
