= Sheila Piercey Summers =

South African tennis player (1919–2005)

Sheila Piercey
- Full name: Sheila Piercey-Summers
- Country (sports): South Africa
- Born: 18 March 1919 Johannesburg, South Africa
- Died: 14 August 2005 (aged 86)
- Plays: Right–handed

Singles
- Highest ranking: No.6 (1947)

Grand Slam singles results
- French Open: SF (1949)
- Wimbledon: SF (1947)

Doubles

Grand Slam doubles results
- French Open: SF (1949)
- Wimbledon: QF (1947, 1949)

Grand Slam mixed doubles results
- French Open: W (1947, 1949)
- Wimbledon: W (1949)

Sheila Piercey (18 March 1919 – 14 August 2005) was a South African tennis player. She was also known under her married name Sheila Piercey-Summers.

Piercey was born in Johannesburg, South Africa. With her compatriot Eric Sturgess, she won three mixed doubles titles: at the French Open in 1947 and 1949 and at Wimbledon in 1949.

In 1947, she became the first South African woman to reach a Wimbledon semifinal in the singles event. She lost the match in straight sets to top-seeded and eventual champion Margaret Osborne. Two years later, in 1949, she again reached the semifinals of the French Championships and again lost to Osborne in straight sets.

Summers won the South African Championships singles title in 1948, 1949 and 1951 and was runner–up in 1939, 1940 and 1947. In August 1947, she won the singles title at the International Swiss Championships at Lausann, defeating Doris Hart in the final in three sets.

After her playing career, she coached the South African Federation Cup team.

== Grand Slam finals ==
=== Mixed doubles (3 titles) ===
Result	Year	Championship	Surface	Partner	Opponents	Score
Win	1947	French Championships	Clay	(South Africa) Eric Sturgess	(Poland) Jadwiga Jędrzejowska (Romania) Cristea Caralulis	6–0, 6–0
Win	1949	French Championships	Clay	(South Africa) Eric Sturgess	(United Kingdom) Jean Quertier (United Kingdom) Gerry Oakley	6–1, 6–1
Win	1949	Wimbledon	Grass	(South Africa) Eric Sturgess	(United States) Louise Brough (Australia) John Bromwich	9–7, 9–11, 7–5
