= Annalisa Bossi =

Italian tennis player

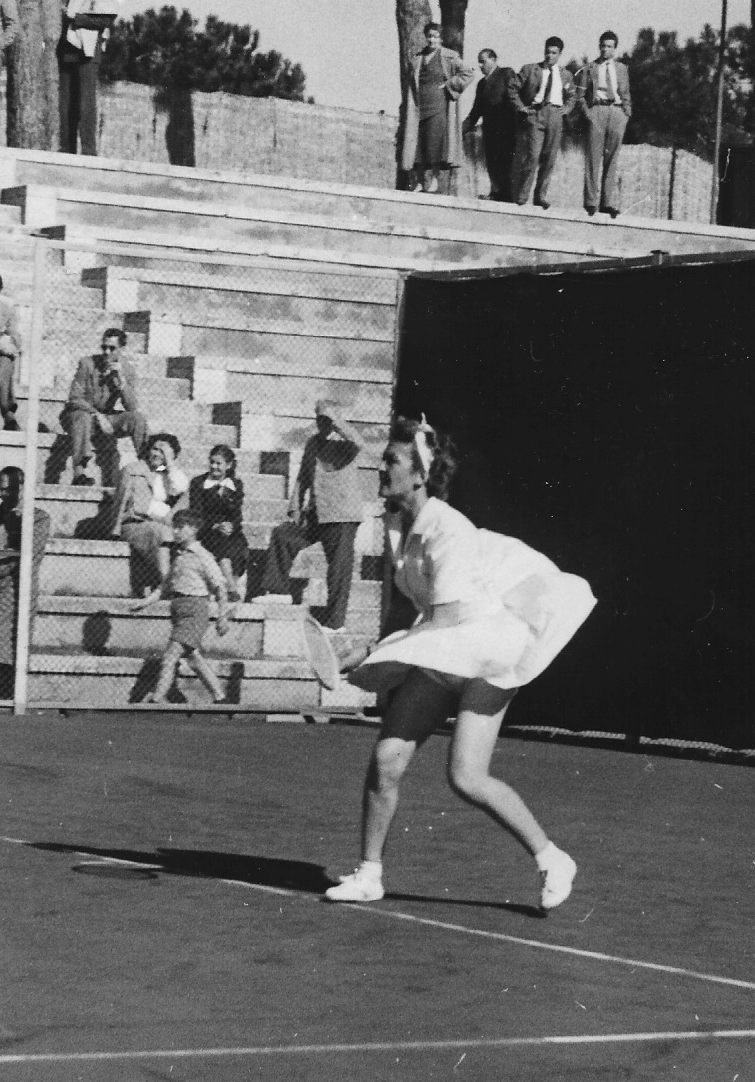
- Bossi at the 1950 Italian Championships
- Full name: Anneliese Ullstein Bossi Bellani
- Country (sports): Italy
- Born: 3 November 1915; Dresden; Germany
- Died: 21 February 2015 (aged 99); Milan, Italy
- Height: 1.68 m (5 ft 6 in)
- Plays: Right-handed

Singles
- Highest ranking: No. 8 (1949, John Olliff)

Grand Slam singles results
- French Open: SF (1949)
- Wimbledon: 4R (1947)

Doubles

Grand Slam doubles results
- French Open: SF (1957)

Annalisa Bossi (born Anneliese Ullstein; then Annalisa Bellani after second marriage; 3 November 1915 – 21 February 2015) was an Italian tennis player.

She won the singles title at the Italian Championships in 1950 after a straight-sets victory in the final against Joan Curry.

== See also ==
- Best result of an Italian tennis player in Grand Slam
