= Helen Pedersen =

American tennis player

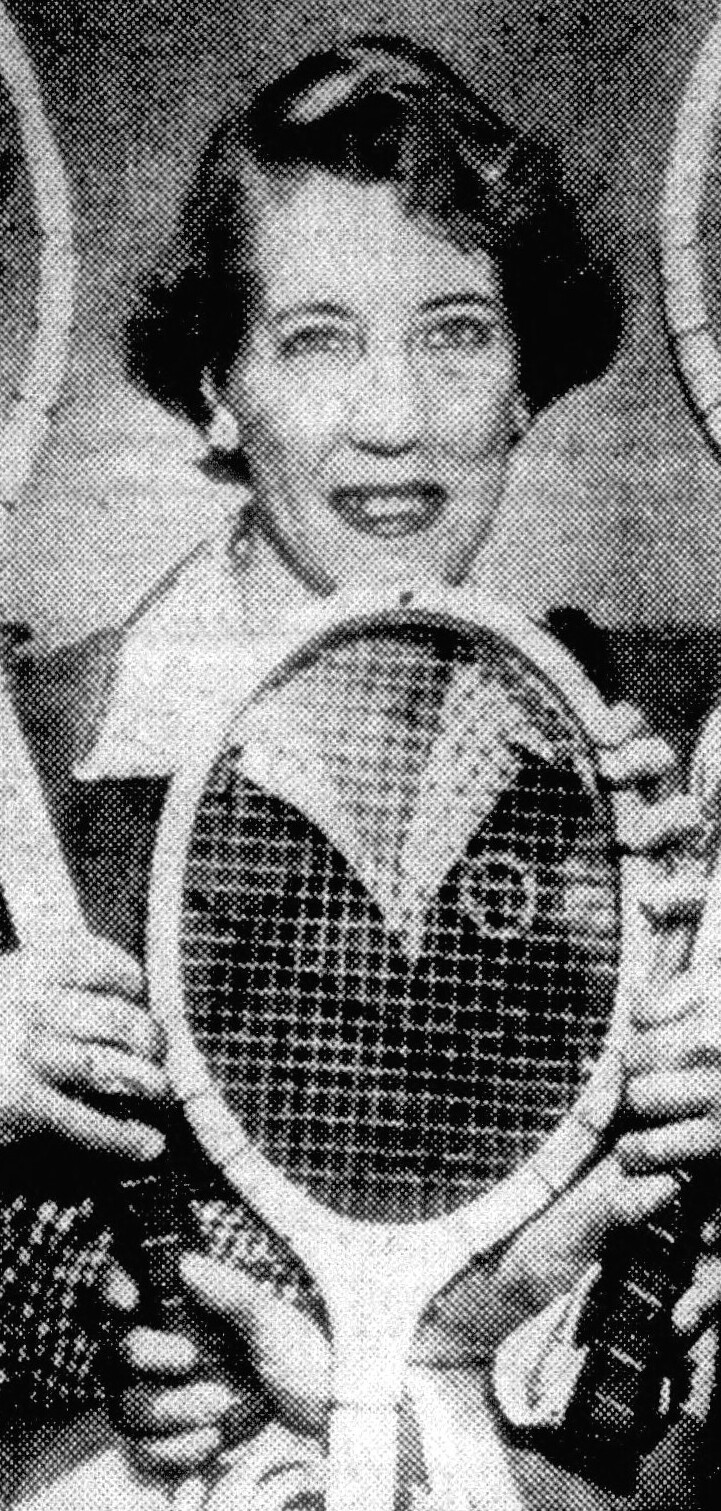
- Pedersen, circa 1950
- Full name: Helen Antoinette Pedersen
- Country (sports): United States
- Born: July 16, 1916; Stamford, Connecticut
- Died: July 5, 1998 (aged 81); Barnstable, Massachusetts
- Plays: Right-handed

Singles

Grand Slam singles results
- French Open: QF (1948, 1949)
- Wimbledon: SF (1949)
- US Open: SF (1936)

Doubles

Grand Slam doubles results
- French Open: SF (1948)
- Wimbledon: SF (1948, 1949)

Helen Antoinette Pedersen (July 16, 1916 – July 5, 1998) was an American amateur tennis player. She competed as Helen Rihbany in the 1940s from her marriage to Edward H. Rihbany, and she later married William McLaughlin.

Pedersen, raised in Stamford, Connecticut, was national junior champion in 1934 and made the semifinals of the 1936 U.S. National Championships. She won the singles title at the U.S. Women's Indoor Championships in 1945 and 1946. In 1949, she made the singles semifinals at Wimbledon and was a quarterfinalist at the French Championships. During her career, she regularly was ranked in the national top 10.
