= Gussie Moran =

American tennis player

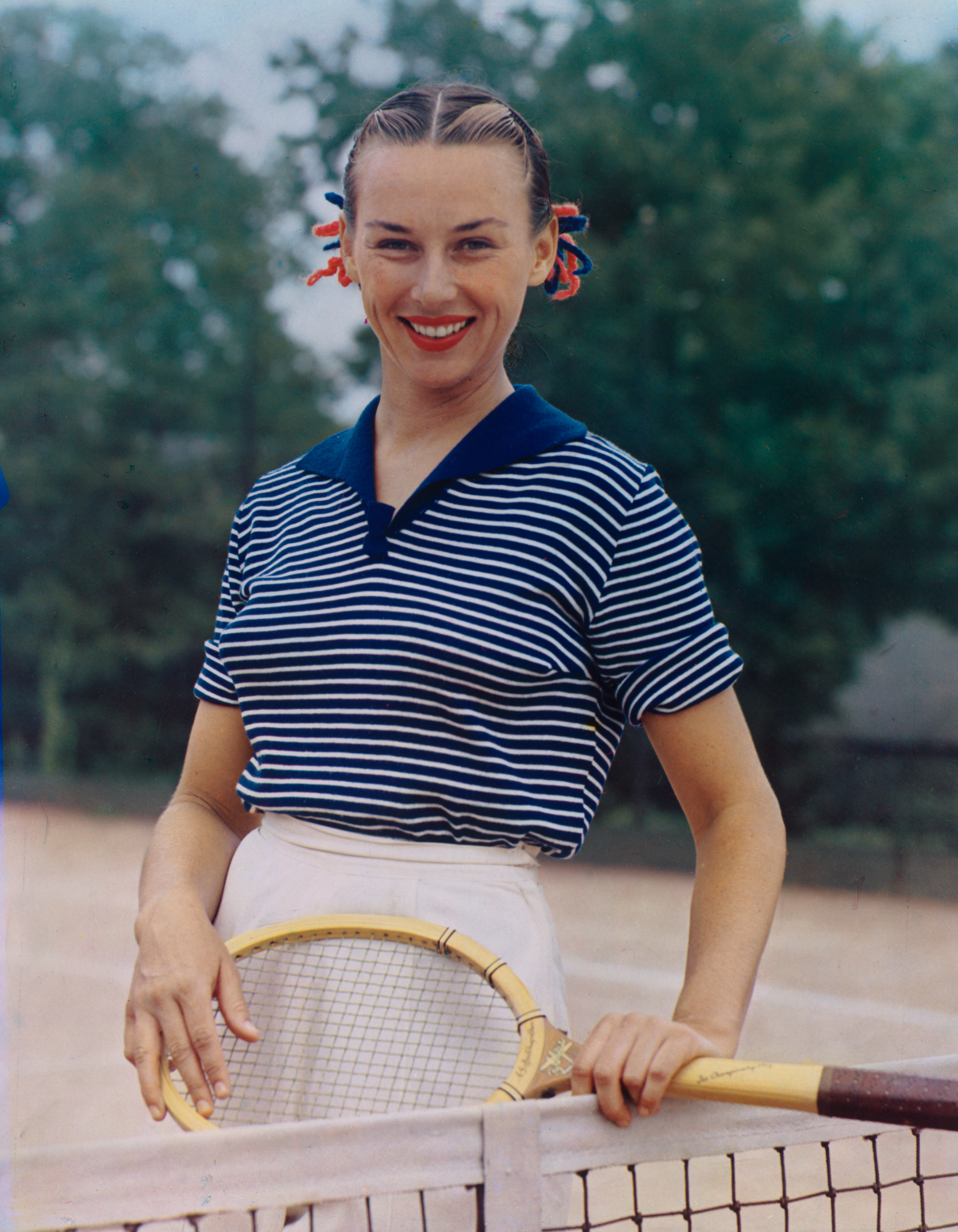
- Country (sports): United States
- Born: September 8, 1923; Santa Monica, California, U.S.
- Died: January 16, 2013 (aged 89); Los Angeles, California, US
- Height: 1.73 m (5 ft 8 in)
- Turned pro: 1950
- Retired: 1971
- Plays: Right-handed

Singles

Grand Slam singles results
- Wimbledon: QF (1950)
- US Open: SF (1948)

Doubles

Grand Slam doubles results
- Wimbledon: F (1949)

Grand Slam mixed doubles results
- Wimbledon: QF (1950)
- US Open: F (1947)

Gertrude Augusta "Gussie" (or "Gussy") Moran (September 8, 1923 – January 16, 2013) was an American tennis player who was active in the late 1940s and 1950s. Her highest US national tennis ranking was 4th. She was born in Santa Monica, California and died in Los Angeles, California, aged 89.

== Early life and amateur tennis career ==
Moran's father (who died in 1960) was a sound technician and electrician at Universal Studios, and possibly because of his connections, Moran worked as an extra in a few movies of the 1940s; her tennis groups occasionally enjoyed weekly Sunday soirees at Charlie Chaplin's mansion. Their friendship was so close that Chaplin hosted a party for Moran when she got engaged. When Moran was 17, their family was informed that her older brother had been declared missing in action in World War II. She was devastated by the news, and soon went to work at the nearby Douglas Aircraft Company, helping to assemble airplanes for the war effort. She also joined USO tours to California hospitals and military bases.

Moran entered several amateur tennis tournaments in California in her early career. In March 1949, she defeated Nancy Chaffee in straight sets in the final of the US Indoor Championships singles event, played at the Seventh Regiment Armory in New York. She also won the doubles title, partnering Marjorie Gladman, and the mixed doubles event, together with Pancho Gonzales.

=== 1949 Wimbledon controversy ===
Her results made her eligible to play at Wimbledon in 1949. Preparing for that appearance, she asked the official Wimbledon host Ted Tinling to design her outfit. She asked for one sleeve to be one color, the other sleeve to be another color, and the skirt to be a third color. Because of the tournament rule that all outfits had to be white only, he declined, but later agreed to design an outfit that complied with the rule. Her outfit, a short tennis dress with ruffled, lace-trimmed knickers, was short enough for her knickers to be visible during the match, a first for any tournament. In a tennis documentary on ESPN about Wimbledon and the requirement to wear white, long-time tennis analyst Bud Collins remarked about the "naughty" Gussie Moran wearing frilly lace panties at Wimbledon.

Her outfit drew considerable attention; reporters covering the event began calling her "Gorgeous Gussie", and photographers fought for positions where they could get low shots of Moran, with the hope of glimpsing the lace. The event scandalized Wimbledon officials, prompting a debate in Parliament. Moran, who was accused of bringing 'vulgarity and sin into tennis' by the committee of the All England Lawn Tennis and Croquet Club, later reverted to wearing shorts. Tinling, who had acted as official Wimbledon host for 23 years, was shunned for 33 years following the incident (he was invited back to Wimbledon in 1982).

For a 1988 story and interview that reported on the 1949 Wimbledon incident Moran spoke about the event:

Wimbledon officials went mad, and Moran, shocked by the reaction, went into a shell. The first and only time she wore the outfit on court, she walked with her racket in front of her face. "I was embarrassed...because they were putting so much adulation on the character, 'Gorgeous Gussie'. You know, I was really never anything to write home about. I was a plain girl. But Life magazine ran a picture calling me Gorgeous Gussie, and the British picked it up and did a real job with it. Then people would see me and I'd hear them say 'I've seen better-looking waitresses at the hot-dog stand.' I just went to pieces. Emotionally, I couldn't handle it."

== Professional tennis career ==
Following the 1950 Wimbledon tournament, where she was seeded seventh and made it to the quarterfinals, Moran's amateur career ended in September when she began to tour as a professional with Pauline Betz, using the dress incident as the main draw.

Her popularity led her to a cameo appearance (as herself) in the 1952 sports-oriented American movie Pat and Mike, which featured Spencer Tracy and Katharine Hepburn. It also allowed her to adorn magazine covers worldwide, and her name was given to a racehorse, an aircraft and a sauce. She even posed in her frilly kit in department stores.

One of the last tournaments Moran competed in professionally was the 1971 U.S. Open, where in the Women's Singles draw, she was eliminated at the first round. In the same tournament, she partnered with Chuck Diaz in mixed doubles.

== Later life ==
In 1951, Moran began working for Los Angeles television Channel 4, doing a 15-minute interview with Bob Kelley, the voice of the Rams. In 1955. she became a sports newscaster at WMGM in New York City, a position which lasted until 1961. After leaving WMGM, she and a partner became active in manufacturing and selling her own line of tennis clothing (that business closed on 21 November 1963). She then returned to California and became hostess of a racket club in Palm Springs, California. The hostess position did not last long, and she became co-host (with Tom Kennedy) of a daily TV interview show in Hollywood titled Sundown. She was fired after 11 weeks (the show was to run for 13 weeks) when she referred to the Catholic religion as a political party.

Moran then returned to giving tennis lessons at a Lake Encino racket club, remaining there for two and a half years. In 1969, she became advertising manager for World Tennis magazine.

In 1970, she participated in another USO tour, this time to Vietnam. While she was there, her helicopter was shot down, and she suffered several broken and dislocated bones. After recovering from this accident, she obtained a radio sports director position in Los Angeles at station KFAC in 1972, but left after a short stint. She then freelanced for a fabric manufacturer and wrote columns for Tennis magazine. She worked for Tennis Unlimited, a promotional company.

Moran was living at the family's Santa Monica home, a Victorian structure with an ocean view, but with her mother's death, she was unable to pay the property taxes, and was evicted on 26 April 1986. She then moved to a series of small apartments in the Los Angeles area.

== Personal life ==
Moran was married four times. Her first marriage, at age 19, was to an ex-Royal Air Force pilot; that marriage later was annulled. All of her subsequent marriages ended in divorce. Her second marriage, at the age of 30, was to Eddie Hand, a transport firm executive, also known as Mr. Y in the book Beat the Dealer by Edward O. Thorp. In 1956, she was married for three days to New York City-based private investigator and intelligence asset Thomas Corbally, who was Hand's best friend. Her final marriage, at the age of 37, was to Frank "Bing" Simpson, a Los Angeles lawyer-yachtsman. Moran had no children.

According to Jack Kramer, Moran "always preferred to be known as 'Gussy' not 'Gussie'". This is how she was referred to in her Los Angeles Times obituary., although other obituaries retained the more commonly used spelling.

== Grand Slam finals ==
=== Doubles (1 runner-up) ===
Result	Year	Championship	Surface	Partner	Opponents	Score
Loss	1949	Wimbledon	Grass	(United States) Patricia Canning Todd	(United States) Louise Brough (United States) Margaret Osborne duPont	6–8, 5–7

=== Mixed doubles (1 runner-up) ===
Result	Year	Championship	Surface	Partner	Opponents	Score
Loss	1947	U.S. Championships	Grass	(United States) Pancho Segura	(United States) Louise Brough (Australia) John Bromwich	3–6, 1–6
