= Betty Rosenquest Pratt =

American tennis player

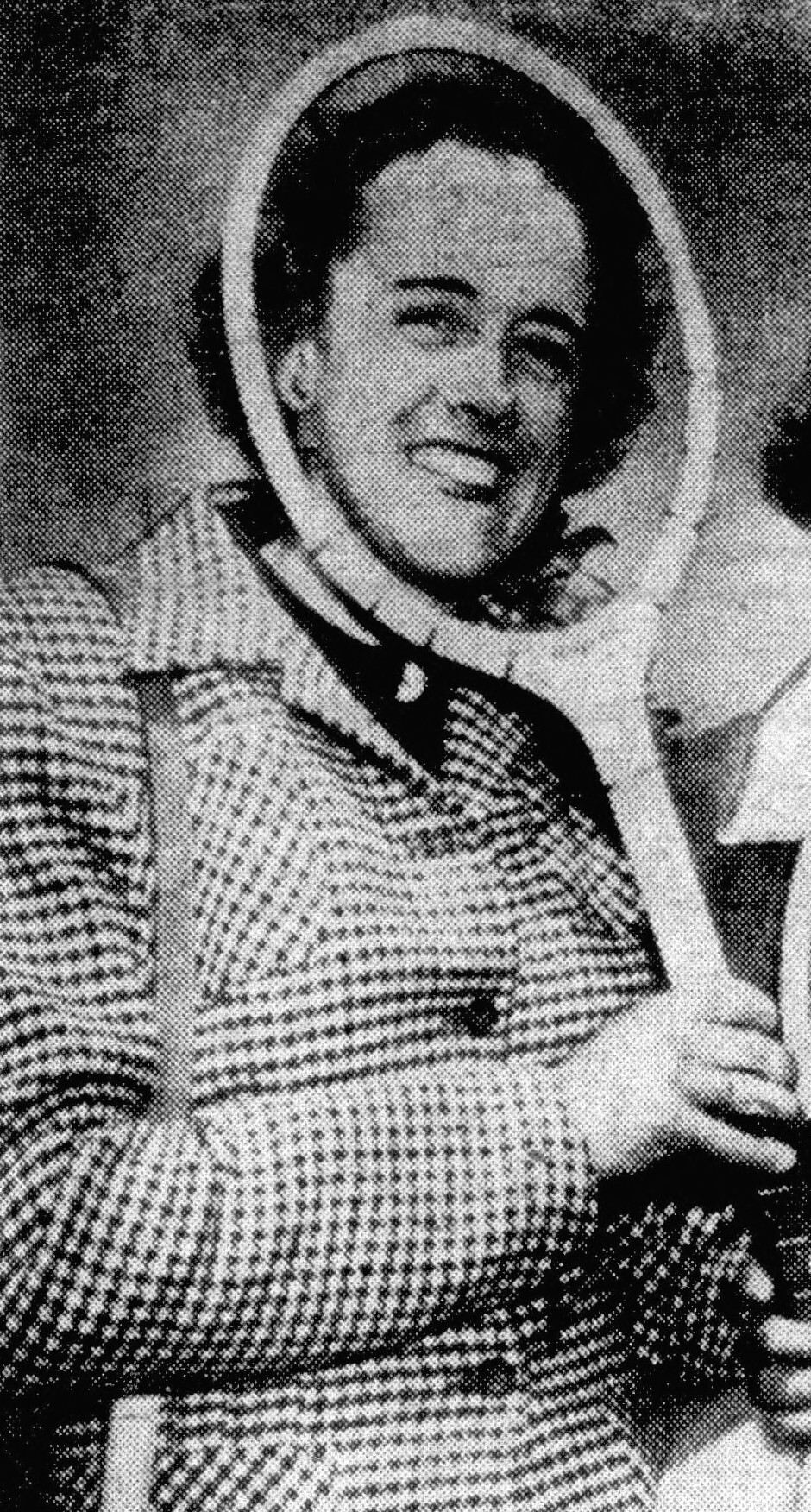
- Rosenquest Pratt, circa 1950
- Country (sports): United States / Jamaica
- Born: April 15, 1925 Virginia, Minnesota, U.S.
- Died: January 31, 2016 (aged 90) Winter Park, Florida, U.S.

Singles
- Highest ranking: No. 7 (1954)

Grand Slam singles results
- French Open: QF (1950)
- Wimbledon: SF (1954)
- US Open: SF (1956)

Doubles

Grand Slam doubles results
- Wimbledon: SF (1951)
- US Open: F (1956)

Grand Slam mixed doubles results
- Wimbledon: QF (1954)

Betty Rosenquest Pratt (April 15, 1925 – January 31, 2016) was an American amateur tennis player who competed in the 1940s, 1950s and 1960s.

Pratt was a student at Florida's Rollins College where she played collegiate tennis, graduating in 1947. She was ranked in the Top Ten in the U.S. in 1951 (ranked number eight), 1954 (number five) and 1956 (number five). At the Wimbledon Championships, Pratt was a semifinalist in both singles (1954), losing to eventual winner Maureen Connolly, and doubles (1951). At the U.S. Nationals, she was a doubles finalist and singles semifinalist in 1956.

At the tournament in Cincinnati, Pratt won the singles title in 1947 (over Betty Hulbert James in the final) and was a doubles finalist (with Margaret Varner) in 1948.

She captained both the U.S. Wightman Cup team and the U.S. Federation Cup Team.

Active in the Caribbean, she also represented Jamaica, and directed the Caribbean Tennis Circuit between 1952 and 1964.

Pratt continued to win titles at seniors events into her 60s and 70s. She was a charter member of the Rollins College Sports Hall of Fame (1977), and is a member of the Florida Tennis Association Hall of Fame (1979) and Eastern Tennis Association Hall of Fame (1998).

== Grand Slam finals ==
=== Doubles ( 1 runner-up) ===
Result	Year	Championship	Surface	Partner	Opponents	Score
Loss	1956	U.S. National Championships	Grass	(United States) Shirley Fry	(United States) Louise Brough (United States) Margaret Osborne	3–6, 0–6
