= Bea Seal =

- Full name: Beatrice Mary Seal
- Country (sports): United Kingdom
- Born: 13 January 1914; Courtrai, Belgium
- Died: 13 January 2011 (aged 97)

Singles

Grand Slam singles results
- French Open: 3R (1948)
- Wimbledon: 4R (1946)
- US Open: 1R (1959)

Doubles

Grand Slam doubles results
- French Open: 2R (1947)
- Wimbledon: QF (1948, 1956)

Grand Slam mixed doubles results
- Wimbledon: 3R (1947, 1957)

Beatrice Mary Seal (nee Watson; 13 January 1914 — 13 January 2011) was a Belgian-born British tennis player.

== Early life ==
Seal was born in Courtrai but was sent to school in England. Her father, Belgian Davis Cup player George Watson, was in the country working in the flax industry. The whole family fled to England at the onset of the German invasion.

== Tennis ==
A regular at Wimbledon, Seal began competing on tour in the 1930s. Her best performances included a fourth round appearance in singles at the 1946 Wimbledon Championships. She was a two-time Wimbledon quarter-finalist in women's doubles, with Mary Halford in 1948 and Doreen Spiers in 1956.

Seal was non-playing captain of the British Wightman Cup team from 1959 to 1963. She was also a tournament referee, who in 1972 was involved in an incident with Pancho Gonzales while overseeing the 1972 Queen's Club Championships. Gonzales, playing in a semi-final, demanded that a linesman be replaced following a series of disputed line calls. When she refused, there was a stand off which ended with Gonzales being disqualified.

== Personal life ==
Married three times, Seal's first marriage was to a Mr Carris. She wed News Chronicle tennis correspondent Gerry Walter in 1948. Her final marriage was to Vernon Seal, who predeceased her in the 1990s. She died on her 97th birthday in 2011.
