= Patricia Canning Todd =

American tennis player (1922–2015)

- Full name: Mary Patricia Canning Todd
- Country (sports): United States
- Born: July 22, 1922 San Francisco, California
- Died: September 5, 2015 (aged 93) Encinitas, California
- Plays: Right–handed

Singles
- Highest ranking: No. 4 (1950)

Grand Slam singles results
- French Open: W (1947)
- Wimbledon: SF (1948, 1949, 1950, 1952)
- US Open: SF (1946, 1948)

Grand Slam doubles results
- French Open: W (1948)
- Wimbledon: W (1947)
- US Open: F (1943, 1947, 1948, 1949, 1951)

Grand Slam mixed doubles results
- French Open: W (1948)
- Wimbledon: F (1950)
- US Open: F (1942)

Patricia Canning Todd (born Mary Patricia Canning, July 22, 1922 – September 5, 2015) was an American tennis player who had her best results just after World War II. In 1947 and 1948, she won a total of four Grand Slam championships: one in singles, two in women's doubles, and one in mixed doubles. She won these titles as a young mother.

== Tennis career ==
Todd and her partner lost seven times to Louise Brough and Margaret Osborne duPont in the women's doubles finals of Grand Slam tournaments. Todd's lone victory over the Brough-Osborne duPont partnership was in the final of the 1947 Wimbledon Championships when Todd teamed with Doris Hart. Todd and her partner lost twice to Brough and her partner in the mixed doubles finals of Grand Slam tournaments.

Todd won the title at the 1947 French International Championships and reached the semifinals there in 1948. At the 1947 event, the fourth-seeded Todd played top-seeded Osborne duPont, the defending champion, in a semifinal that took two days to complete. After Osborne duPont won the first set 6–2, thunderstorm stopped play for the remainder of the day. The next day, Todd, "producing magnificent backhand shots", won after being 1–3 down in the final set. The crowd was so vocal in backing Todd that a referee reversed a line call to give Todd match point. In the final, Doris Hart played an attacking game and led Todd 4–3 in the final set, but "she was against a great fighter who was content to retrieve, and on a slow court, defence overcame attack". At the 1948 event, Todd, who was the favorite and defending champion, was defaulted by French officials after she refused to move her scheduled center court match to court 2. Todd had complained about being last on center court after having played there only one match previously. When requested to move, she refused because of the late hour and because a full set of linesmen would not be present. "They can scratch [default] me if they like. I am not going to play anywhere but on the center court where my match is scheduled." The officials defaulted her, then changed their minds and gave her Nelly Landry's phone number, her opponent, to reschedule. When Landry could not be reached, the default stood.

She returned to the French International Championships in 1950 after a one-year absence, and reached the final where she lost to Hart. Todd went to the hospital after the final for blood poisoning.

Todd won the singles and mixed doubles titles at the South American championships in 1947 and 1948. In 1942 and 1948, she won the U.S. Indoor National Championships. In 1950, she was the singles and doubles titlist at the Asian Championships and the Championships of India. She won both the singles and doubles titles at the Tri Cities Championships in Cincinnati, Ohio in 1951. She also won singles titles at the U.S. Hardcourt Championships in 1950 and 1951, and she was the women's doubles champion there in 1950, 1955, 1956, and 1957.

According to John Olliff and Lance Tingay of The Daily Telegraph and the Daily Mail, Todd was ranked in the world top 10 from 1946 through 1952 (no rankings issued from 1940 through 1945), reaching a career high of world no. 4 in those rankings in 1950. Todd was included in the year-end top 10 rankings issued by the United States Lawn Tennis Association in 1942 and from 1944 through 1952, reaching a career high ranking of no. 4 in 1947 and 1949. She unsuccessfully complained about her no. 6 ranking in 1948, especially the placement of Beverly Baker, Gertrude Moran, and Hart above her, accusing the USLTA of having no standard ranking rules and of punishing her for refusing to play her semifinal match against Landry in Paris.

Todd played doubles on the U.S. Wightman Cup team from 1947 to 1951, compiling a 4–1 win–loss record.

Todd was nominated for induction into the International Tennis Hall of Fame in 2005, but she was not selected. She was inducted into the San Diego Tennis Hall of Fame in 2010. Todd was inducted to the Southern California Tennis Association Hall of Fame, 2011.

== Personal life ==
Patricia married Richard Bradburn Todd on December 25, 1941. They had two children, Patrica Ann Todd on November 7, 1943, and Whitney Seaton Todd on July 1, 1953. She died on September 5, 2015, in Encinitas, California, at the age of 93.

== Grand Slam singles tournament timeline ==
Key
W	F	SF	QF	#R	RR	Q#	DNQ	A	NH

(W) winner; (F) finalist; (SF) semifinalist; (QF) quarterfinalist; (#R) rounds 4, 3, 2, 1; (RR) round-robin stage; (Q#) qualification round; (DNQ) did not qualify; (A) absent; (NH) not held; (SR) strike rate (events won / competed); (W–L) win–loss record.

Tournament	1938	1939	1940	1941	1942	1943	1944	1945	1946^{1}	1947^{1}	1948	1949	1950	1951	1952	1953 – 1956	1957	Career SR
Australian Championships	A	A	A	NH	NH	NH	NH	NH	A	A	A	A	A	A	A	A	A	0 / 0
French Championships	A	A	NH	R	R	R	R	A	3R	W	SF	A	F	A	A	A	A	1 / 4
Wimbledon	A	A	NH	NH	NH	NH	NH	NH	3R	QF	SF	SF	SF	A	SF	A	A	0 / 6
U.S. Championships	1R	1R	3R	3R	2R	A	2R	QF	SF	QF	SF	QF	QF	3R	A	A	3R	0 / 14
SR	0 / 1	0 / 1	0 / 1	0 / 1	0 / 1	0 / 0	0 / 1	0 / 1	0 / 3	1 / 3	0 / 3	0 / 2	0 / 3	0 / 1	0 / 1	0 / 0	0 / 1	1 / 24

R = tournament restricted to French nationals and held under German occupation.

^{1}In 1946 and 1947, the French Championships were held after Wimbledon.

== Grand Slam finals ==
=== Singles (1 title, 1 runner-up) ===
Result	Year	Championship	Surface	Opponent	Score
Win	1947	French Championships	Clay	(United States) Doris Hart	6–3, 3–6, 6–4
Loss	1950	French Championships	Clay	(United States) Doris Hart	4–6, 6–4, 2–6

=== Doubles (2 titles, 8 runners-up) ===
Result	Year	Championship	Surface	Partner	Opponents	Score
Loss	1943	U.S. Championships	Grass	(United States) Mary Arnold Prentiss	(United States) Louise Brough (United States) Margaret Osborne duPont	1–6, 3–6
Loss	1946	U.S. Championships	Grass	(United States) Mary Arnold Prentiss	(United States) Louise Brough (United States) Margaret Osborne duPont	1–6, 3–6
Win	1947	Wimbledon	Grass	(United States) Doris Hart	(United States) Louise Brough (United States) Margaret Osborne duPont	3–6, 6–4, 7–5
Loss	1947	French Championships	Clay	(United States) Doris Hart	(United States) Louise Brough (United States) Margaret Osborne duPont	5–7, 2–6
Loss	1947	U.S. Championships	Grass	(United States) Doris Hart	(United States) Louise Brough (United States) Margaret Osborne duPont	7–5, 3–6, 5–7
Win	1948	French Championships	Clay	(United States) Doris Hart	(United States) Shirley Fry Irvin (United States) Mary Arnold Prentiss	6–4, 6–2
Loss	1948	Wimbledon	Grass	(United States) Doris Hart	(United States) Louise Brough (United States) Margaret Osborne duPont	3–6, 6–3, 3–6
Loss	1948	U.S. Championships	Grass	(United States) Doris Hart	(United States) Louise Brough (United States) Margaret Osborne duPont	4–6, 10–8, 1–6
Loss	1949	Wimbledon	Grass	(United States) Gussie Moran	(United States) Louise Brough (United States) Margaret Osborne duPont	6–8, 5–7
Loss	1951	U.S. Championships	Grass	(United States) Nancy Chaffee	(United States) Shirley Fry Irvin (United States) Doris Hart	4–6, 2–6

=== Mixed doubles (1 titles, 3 runners-up) ===
Result	Year	Championship	Surface	Partner	Opponents	Score
Loss	1942	U.S. Championships	Grass	(Argentina) Alejo Russell	(United States) Louise Brough (United States) Frederick Schroeder	6–3, 1–6, 4–6
Win	1948	French Championships	Clay	(Czechoslovakia) Jaroslav Drobný	(United States) Doris Hart (Australia) Frank Sedgman	6–3, 3–6, 6–3
Loss	1950	French Championships	Clay	(United States) Bill Talbert	(United States) Barbara Scofield Davidson (Argentina) Enrique Morea	Walkover
Loss	1950	Wimbledon	Grass	(Australia) Geoff Brown	(United States) Louise Brough (South Africa) Eric Sturgess	9–11, 6–1, 4–6

== See also ==
- Performance timelines for all female tennis players since 1978 who reached at least one Grand Slam final
