= Anne-Marie Seghers =

French tennis player

- Full name: Anne-Marie Seghers Simon
- Country (sports): France
- Born: 15 September 1911; Paris, France
- Died: 17 January 2012 (aged 100); Puteaux, France
- Plays: Left-handed

Singles

Grand Slam singles results
- French Open: QF (1949,1954)
- Wimbledon: 3R (1950)

Doubles

Grand Slam doubles results
- Wimbledon: 2R (1949, 1950)

Grand Slam mixed doubles results
- Wimbledon: 1R (1949, 1950)

Anne-Marie Lucienne Seghers (15 September 1911 – 17 January 2012) was a French tennis player . She reached the singles final at the 1941 French Championships in which she was defeated by Alice Weiwers in straight sets. As the final was played during wartime in occupied France it is not recognized as an official French Championship and is known by the name Tournoi de France. She reached the quarterfinals in 1949 and 1954. Seghers competed in the Wimbledon Championships in 1949 and 1950. In the singles event in 1950 she reached the third round in which she lost to Gussie Moran.

In April 1955 she was runner-up to Ginette Bucaille in the singles event at the International Championships of Paris.

Seghers was ranked joint No.1 in France in 1950.

== Tournoi de France finals ==
=== Singles (1 runner-up) ===
Result	Year	Championship	Opponent	Score
Loss	1941	Tournoi de France	(Luxembourg) Alice Weiwers	3–6, 0–6
