= List of French Open men's doubles champions =

== Champions ==
Regular competition
† Not considered to be a Grand Slam event. A French club members only-tournament called the French Championships
†† Disputed champions: Not considered to be a Grand Slam event. Not sanctioned or recognised by the FFT (Note: Due to World War II, the tournaments held from 1941 to 1945 are not officially recognized by the Fédération Française de Tennis. Consequently, despite being listed by a few sources, the champions from those years are not included in the official statistics. They are listed here as a historical note.)
Further information: Tournoi de France (tennis)

=== French Championships ===
The French Championships tennis tournament began in 1891. The tournament was open only to French citizens and permanent residents through 1924, but beginning in 1925, the French Championships became an international event open to all nationalities.

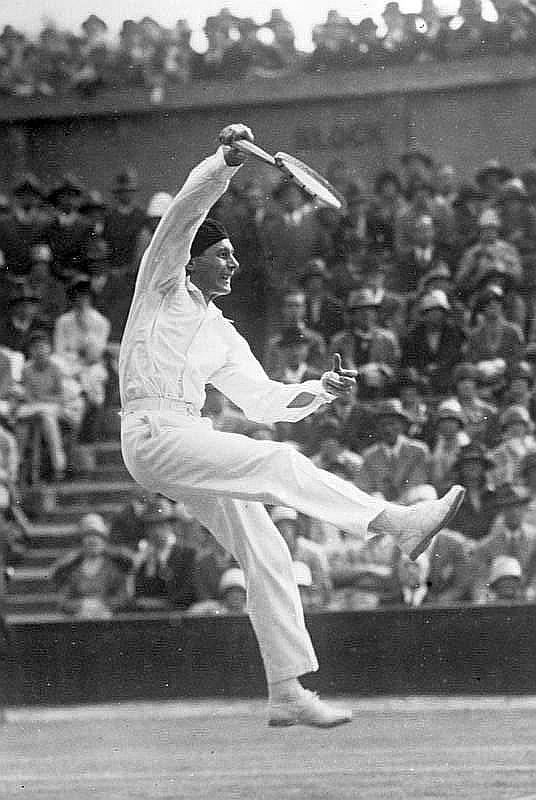
Jean Borotra won five men's doubles titles, including 1925, the first year the championship was open for foreign players

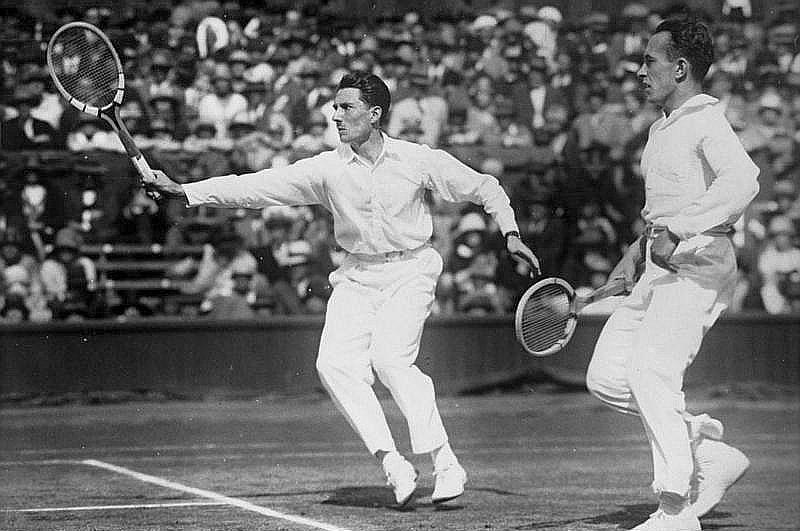
Jacques Brugnon (l), here with Henri Cochet, won the title on five occasions.

Year	Champions	Runners-up	Score
1891	(France) B. Desjoyau (France) T. Legrand	(France) Cucheval-Clarigny (France) Boulanger	
1892	(France) Diaz-Albertini (France) J. Havet	(France) Cucheval-Clarigny (Peru) Carlos de Candamo	
1893	(France) Jean Schopfer (United Kingdom) J. Goldsmith	(United Kingdom) G. Hetley (France) Ortmans	6-4, 4-6, 6-2
1894	(France) Gérard Brosselin (France) J. Lesage	(United Kingdom) G. Hetley (United Kingdom) Robinson	6-4, 2-6, 6-2
1895	(France) André Vacherot (German Empire) Christian Winzer	(France) Paul Lebreton (France) Paul Lecaron	6-2, 6-1
1896	(United Kingdom) Archibald Warden (United Kingdom) Wynes	(France) André Vacherot (France) Marcel Vacherot	6-4, 8-6
1897	(France) Paul Aymé (France) Paul Lebreton	(United Kingdom) Archibald Warden (France) Longchamps	6-3, 6-0
1898	(France) Marcel Vacherot (United Kingdom) Xenophon Kasdaglis		
1899	(France) Paul Aymé (France) Paul Lebreton		
1900	(France) Paul Aymé (France) Paul Lebreton		
1901	(France) André Vacherot (France) Marcel Vacherot		
1902	(France) Max Decugis (France) Jacques Worth		
1903	(France) Max Decugis (France) Jacques Worth	(France) André Vacherot (France) Marcel Vacherot	8-6, 6-4, retired
1904	(France) Max Decugis (France) Maurice Germot	(France) André Vacherot (France) Paul Aymé	6-3, 6-3, 6-1
1905	(France) Max Decugis (France) Jacques Worth		
1906	(France) Max Decugis (France) Maurice Germot	(France) Édouard Mény de Marangue (United Kingdom) Graham	6-1, 6-2, 6-3
1907	(France) Max Decugis (France) Maurice Germot	(France) G. Siry (France) Robert Wallet	6-4, 6-2, 6-1
1908	(France) Max Decugis (France) Maurice Germot		
1909	(France) Max Decugis (France) Maurice Germot		
1910	(France) Marcel Dupont (France) Maurice Germot		
1911	(France) Max Decugis (France) Maurice Germot	(France) André Gobert (France) William Laurentz	6-3, 6-4, 7-5
1912	(France) Max Decugis (France) Maurice Germot		
1913	(France) Max Decugis (France) Maurice Germot	(France) Albert Canet (France) William Laurentz	6-4, 2-6, 6-2, 6-8, 6-2
1914	(France) Max Decugis (France) Maurice Germot	(France) William Laurentz (Austria-Hungary) Ludwig von Salm-Hoogstraeten	6-4, 6-4, 4-6, 4-6, 6-4
1915	No competition (due to World War I) (Note: The tournament was not held from 1915 to 1919 because of World War I.)		
1916	No competition (due to World War I)		
1917	No competition (due to World War I)		
1918	No competition (due to World War I)		
1919	No competition (due to World War I)		
1920	(France) Max Decugis (France) Maurice Germot	(France) Jacques Brugnon (France) Marcel Dupont	6-3, 6-4, 6-3
1921	(France) André Gobert (France) William Laurentz	(France) Max Decugis (France) Maurice Germot	7-5, 6-3, 6-4
1922	(France) Jacques Brugnon (France) Marcel Dupont	(France) André Gobert (France) Jean Couiteas	6-1, 6-4, 6-3
1923	(France) Jean Samazeuilh (France) Jean-François Blanchy	(France) René Lacoste (France) Henri Cochet	6-8, 6-1, 6-4, 3-6, 6-3
1924	(France) Jean Borotra (France) René Lacoste	(France) Henri Cochet (France) Jean Samazeuilh	10-8, 9-7, 6-2
1925	(France) Jean Borotra (France) René Lacoste	(France) Henri Cochet (France) Jacques Brugnon	7–5, 4–6, 6–3, 2–6, 6–3
1926	(United States) Vincent Richards (United States) Howard Kinsey	(France) Henri Cochet (France) Jacques Brugnon	6–4, 6–1, 4–6, 6–4
1927	(France) Henri Cochet (France) Jacques Brugnon	(France) Jean Borotra (France) René Lacoste	2–6, 6–2, 6–0, 1–6, 6–4
1928	(France) Jean Borotra (France) Jacques Brugnon	(France) Henri Cochet (France) René de Buzelet	6–4, 3–6, 6–2, 3–6, 6–4
1929	(France) René Lacoste (France) Jean Borotra	(France) Henri Cochet (France) Jacques Brugnon	6–3, 3–6, 6–3, 3–6, 8–6
1930	(France) Henri Cochet (France) Jacques Brugnon	(Australia) Harry Hopman (Australia) Jim Willard	6–3, 9–7, 6–3
1931	(United States) George Lott (United States) John Van Ryn	(South Africa) Vernon Kirby (South Africa) Norman Farquharson	6–4, 6–3, 6–4
1932	(France) Henri Cochet (France) Jacques Brugnon	(France) Christian Boussus (France) Marcel Bernard	6–4, 3–6, 7–5, 6–3
1933	(United Kingdom) Pat Hughes (United Kingdom) Fred Perry	(Australia) Vivian McGrath (Australia) Adrian Quist	6–2, 6–4, 2–6, 7–5
1934	(France) Jean Borotra (France) Jacques Brugnon	(Australia) Jack Crawford (Australia) Vivian McGrath	11–9, 6–3, 2–6, 4–6, 9–7
1935	(Australia) Jack Crawford (Australia) Adrian Quist	(Australia) Vivian McGrath (Australia) Don Turnbull	6–1, 6–4, 6–2
1936	(France) Jean Borotra (France) Marcel Bernard	(United Kingdom) Pat Hughes (United Kingdom) Raymond Tuckey	6–2, 3–6, 9–7, 6–1
1937	(Nazi Germany) Gottfried von Cramm (Nazi Germany) Henner Henkel	(South Africa) Norman Farquharson (South Africa) Vernon Kirby	6–4, 7–5, 3–6, 6–1
1938	(France) Bernard Destremau (France) Yvon Petra	(United States) Don Budge (United States) Gene Mako	3–6, 6–3, 9–7, 6–1
1939	(United States) Don McNeill (United States) Charles Harris	(France) Jean Borotra (France) Jacques Brugnon	4–6, 6–4, 6–0, 2–6, 10–8
1940	No competition (due to World War II) (Note: The tournament was not held from 1941 to 1945 because of World War II.)		
1941	(France) Christian Boussus (France) Bernard Destremau	(France) Robert Ramillon (France) Georges Zafiri	7–5, 6–3, 5–7, 6–4
1942	(France) Bernard Destremau (France) Yvon Petra	(France) Henri Cochet (France) Paul Féret	6–3, 6–4, 10–8
1943	(France) Marcel Bernard (France) Yvon Petra	(France) Christian Boussus (France) Henri Cochet	6–3, 7–5, 5–7, 6–4
1944	(France) Marcel Bernard (France) Yvon Petra	(France) Henri Bolelli (France) Henri Pellizza	6–1, 1–6, 6–3, 6–2
1945	(France) Henri Cochet (France) Pierre Pellizza	(France) Bernard Destremau (France) Yvon Petra	2–6, 6–4, 8–6, 3–6, 6–0
1946	(France) Marcel Bernard (France) Yvon Petra	(Argentina) Enrique Morea (United States) Pancho Segura	7–5, 6–3, 0–6, 1–6, 10–8
1947	(South Africa) Eustace Fannin (South Africa) Eric Sturgess	(United States) Tom Brown (Australia) Bill Sidwell	6–4, 4–6, 6–4, 6–3
1948	(Sweden) Lennart Bergelin (Czechoslovakia) Jaroslav Drobný	(Australia) Harry Hopman (Australia) Frank Sedgman	8–6, 6–1, 12–10
1949	(United States) Pancho Gonzalez (United States) Frank Parker	(South Africa) Eustace Fannin (South Africa) Eric Sturgess	6–3, 8–6, 5–7, 6–3
1950	(United States) Bill Talbert (United States) Tony Trabert	(Egypt) Jaroslav Drobný (South Africa) Eric Sturgess	6–2, 1–6, 10–8, 6–2
1951	(Australia) Ken McGregor (Australia) Frank Sedgman	(United States) Gardnar Mulloy (United States) Dick Savitt	6–2, 2–6, 9–7, 7–5
1952	(Australia) Ken McGregor (Australia) Frank Sedgman	(United States) Gardnar Mulloy (United States) Dick Savitt	6–3, 6–4, 6–4
1953	(Australia) Lew Hoad (Australia) Ken Rosewall	(Australia) Mervyn Rose (Australia) Clive Wilderspin	6–2, 6–1, 6–1
1954	(United States) Vic Seixas (United States) Tony Trabert	(Australia) Lew Hoad (Australia) Ken Rosewall	6–4, 6–2, 6–1
1955	(United States) Vic Seixas (United States) Tony Trabert	(Italy) Nicola Pietrangeli (Italy) Orlando Sirola	6–1, 4–6, 6–2, 6–4
1956	(Australia) Don Candy (United States) Bob Perry	(Australia) Ashley Cooper (Australia) Lew Hoad	7–5, 6–3, 6–3
1957	(Australia) Mal Anderson (Australia) Ashley Cooper	(Australia) Don Candy (Australia) Mervyn Rose	6–3, 6–0, 6–3
1958	(Australia) Ashley Cooper (Australia) Neale Fraser	(Australia) Robert Howe (South Africa) Abe Segal	3–6, 8–6, 6–3, 7–5
1959	(Italy) Nicola Pietrangeli (Italy) Orlando Sirola	(Australia) Roy Emerson (Australia) Neale Fraser	6–3, 6–2, 14–12
1960	(Australia) Roy Emerson (Australia) Neale Fraser	(Spain) José Luis Arilla (Spain) Andrés Gimeno	6–2, 8–10, 7–5, 6–4
1961	(Australia) Roy Emerson (Australia) Rod Laver	(Australia) Robert Howe (Australia) Bob Mark	3–6, 6–1, 6–1, 6–4
1962	(Australia) Roy Emerson (Australia) Neale Fraser	(West Germany) Wilhelm Bungert (West Germany) Christian Kuhnke	6–3, 6–4, 7–5
1963	(Australia) Roy Emerson (Spain) Manuel Santana	(South Africa) Gordon Forbes (South Africa) Abe Segal	6–2, 6–4, 6–4
1964	(Australia) Roy Emerson (Australia) Ken Fletcher	(Australia) John Newcombe (Australia) Tony Roche	7–5, 6–3, 3–6, 7–5
1965	(Australia) Roy Emerson (Australia) Fred Stolle	(Australia) Ken Fletcher (South Africa) Bob Hewitt	6–8, 6–3, 8–6, 6–2
1966	(United States) Clark Graebner (United States) Dennis Ralston	(Romania) Ilie Năstase (Romania) Ion Țiriac	6–3, 6–3, 6–0
1967	(Australia) John Newcombe (Australia) Tony Roche	(Australia) Roy Emerson (Australia) Ken Fletcher	6–3, 9–7, 12–10

=== French Open ===
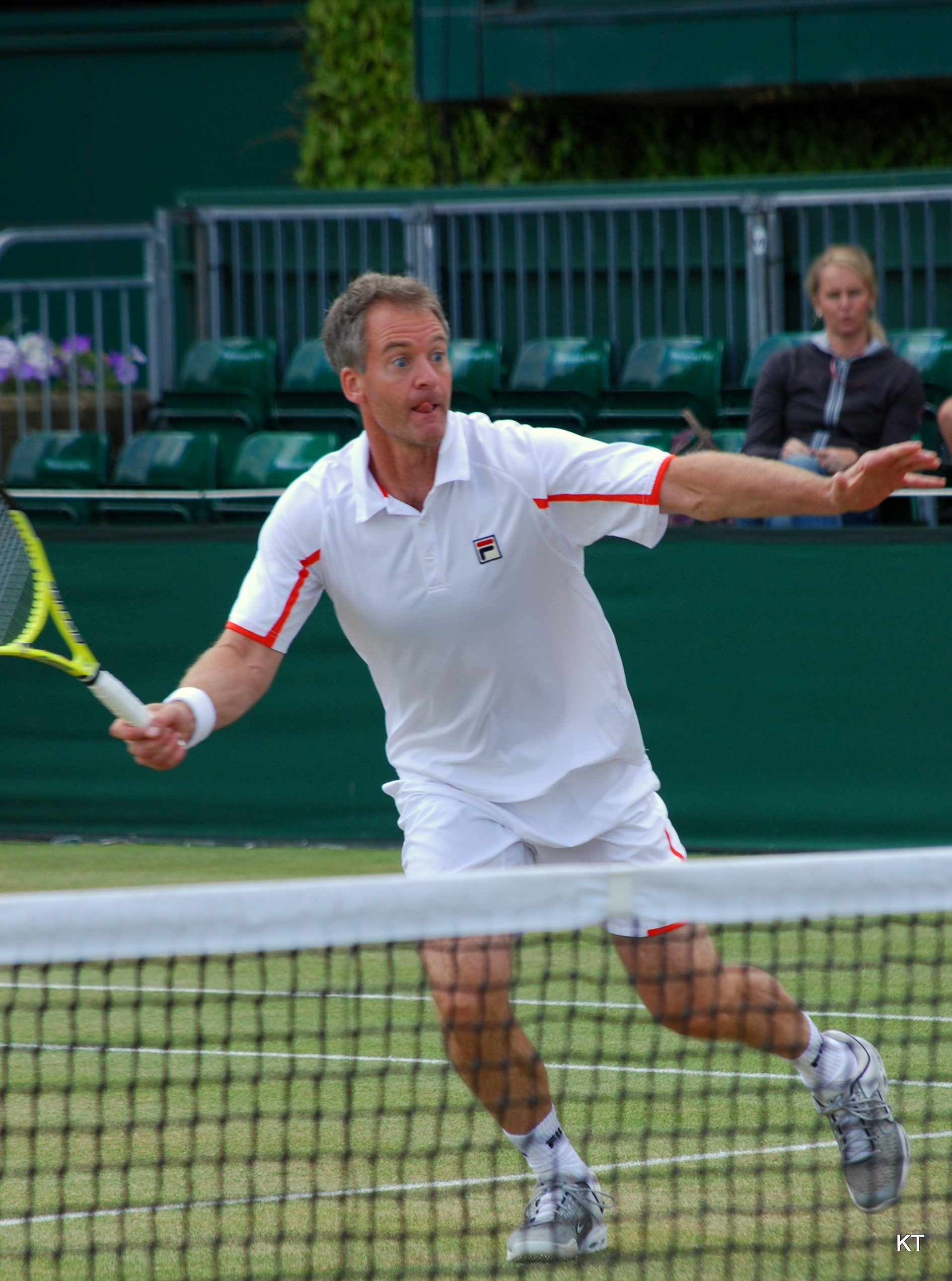
Anders Järryd reached five men's doubles finals of which he won three (1983, 1987, 1991).

Year	Champions	Runners-up	Score
1968	(Australia) Ken Rosewall (Australia) Fred Stolle	(Australia) Roy Emerson (Australia) Rod Laver	6–3, 6–4, 6–3
1969	(Australia) John Newcombe (Australia) Tony Roche	(Australia) Roy Emerson (Australia) Rod Laver	4–6, 6–1, 3–6, 6–4, 6–4
1970	(Romania) Ilie Năstase (Romania) Ion Țiriac	(United States) Arthur Ashe (United States) Charlie Pasarell	6–2, 6–4, 6–3
1971	(United States) Arthur Ashe (United States) Marty Riessen	(United States) Tom Gorman (United States) Stan Smith	6–8, 4–6, 6–3, 6–4, 11–9
1972	(South Africa) Bob Hewitt (South Africa) Frew McMillan	(Chile) Patricio Cornejo (Chile) Jaime Fillol	6–3, 8–6, 3–6, 6–1
1973	(Australia) John Newcombe (Netherlands) Tom Okker	(United States) Jimmy Connors (Romania) Ilie Năstase	6–1, 3–6, 6–3, 5–7, 6–4
1974	(Australia) Dick Crealy (New Zealand) Onny Parun	(United States) Bob Lutz (United States) Stan Smith	6–3, 6–2, 3–6, 5–7, 6–1
1975	(United States) Brian Gottfried (Mexico) Raúl Ramírez	(Australia) John Alexander (Australia) Phil Dent	6–4, 2–6, 6–2, 6–4
1976	(United States) Fred McNair (United States) Sherwood Stewart	(United States) Brian Gottfried (Mexico) Raúl Ramírez	7–6^{(8–6)}, 6–3, 6–1
1977	(United States) Brian Gottfried (Mexico) Raúl Ramírez	(Poland) Wojtek Fibak (Czechoslovakia) Jan Kodeš	7–6, 4–6, 6–3, 6–4
1978	(United States) Gene Mayer (United States) Hank Pfister	(Spain) José Higueras (Spain) Manuel Orantes	6–3, 6–2, 6–2
1979	(United States) Gene Mayer (United States) Sandy Mayer	(Australia) Ross Case (Australia) Phil Dent	6–4, 6–4, 6–4
1980	(United States) Victor Amaya (United States) Hank Pfister	(United States) Brian Gottfried (Mexico) Raúl Ramírez	1–6, 6–4, 6–4, 6–3
1981	(Switzerland) Heinz Günthardt (Hungary) Balázs Taróczy	(United States) Terry Moor (United States) Eliot Teltscher	6–2, 7–6, 6–3
1982	(United States) Sherwood Stewart (United States) Ferdi Taygan	(Chile) Hans Gildemeister (Chile) Belus Prajoux	7–5, 6–3, 1–1, retired
1983	(Sweden) Anders Järryd (Sweden) Hans Simonsson	(Australia) Mark Edmondson (United States) Sherwood Stewart	7–6^{(7–4)}, 6–4, 6–2
1984	(France) Henri Leconte (France) Yannick Noah	(Czechoslovakia) Pavel Složil (Czechoslovakia) Tomáš Šmíd	6–4, 2–6, 3–6, 6–3, 6–2
1985	(Australia) Mark Edmondson (Australia) Kim Warwick	(Israel) Shlomo Glickstein (Sweden) Hans Simonsson	6–3, 6–4, 6–7, 6–3
1986	(Australia) John Fitzgerald (Czechoslovakia) Tomáš Šmíd	(Sweden) Stefan Edberg (Sweden) Anders Järryd	6–3, 4–6, 6–3, 6–7^{(4–7)}, 14–12
1987	(Sweden) Anders Järryd (United States) Robert Seguso	(France) Guy Forget (France) Yannick Noah	6–7, 6–7, 6–3, 6–4, 6–2
1988	(Ecuador) Andrés Gómez (Spain) Emilio Sánchez	(Australia) John Fitzgerald (Sweden) Anders Järryd	6–3, 6–7^{(8–10)}, 6–4, 6–3
1989	(United States) Jim Grabb (United States) Patrick McEnroe	(Iran) Mansour Bahrami (France) Éric Winogradsky	6–4, 2–6, 6–4, 7–6^{(7–5)}
1990	(Spain) Sergio Casal (Spain) Emilio Sánchez	(Socialist Federal Republic of Yugoslavia) Goran Ivanišević (Czechoslovakia) Petr Korda	7–5, 6–3
1991	(Australia) John Fitzgerald (Sweden) Anders Järryd	(United States) Rick Leach (United States) Jim Pugh	6–0, 7–6^{(7–2)}
1992	(Switzerland) Jakob Hlasek (Switzerland) Marc Rosset	(South Africa) David Adams (Russia) Andrei Olhovskiy	7–6^{(7–4)}, 6–7^{(3–7)}, 7–5
1993	(United States) Luke Jensen (United States) Murphy Jensen	(Germany) Marc-Kevin Goellner (Germany) David Prinosil	6–4, 6–7^{(4–7)}, 6–4
1994	(Zimbabwe) Byron Black (United States) Jonathan Stark	(Sweden) Jan Apell (Sweden) Jonas Björkman	6–4, 7–6^{(7–5)}
1995	(Netherlands) Jacco Eltingh (Netherlands) Paul Haarhuis	(Sweden) Nicklas Kulti (Sweden) Magnus Larsson	6–7^{(3–7)}, 6–4, 6–1
1996	(Russia) Yevgeny Kafelnikov (Czech Republic) Daniel Vacek	(France) Guy Forget (Switzerland) Jakob Hlasek	6–2, 6–3
1997	(Russia) Yevgeny Kafelnikov (Czech Republic) Daniel Vacek	(Australia) Todd Woodbridge (Australia) Mark Woodforde	7–6^{(14–12)}, 4–6, 6–3
1998	(Netherlands) Jacco Eltingh (Netherlands) Paul Haarhuis	(The Bahamas) Mark Knowles (Canada) Daniel Nestor	6–3, 3–6, 6–3
1999	(India) Mahesh Bhupathi (India) Leander Paes	(Croatia) Goran Ivanišević (United States) Jeff Tarango	6–2, 7–5
2000	(Australia) Todd Woodbridge (Australia) Mark Woodforde	(Netherlands) Paul Haarhuis (Australia) Sandon Stolle	7–6, 6–4
2001	(India) Mahesh Bhupathi (India) Leander Paes	(Czech Republic) Petr Pála (Czech Republic) Pavel Vízner	7–6, 6–3
2002	(Netherlands) Paul Haarhuis (Russia) Yevgeny Kafelnikov	(The Bahamas) Mark Knowles (Canada) Daniel Nestor	7–5, 6–4
2003	(United States) Bob Bryan (United States) Mike Bryan	(Netherlands) Paul Haarhuis (Russia) Yevgeny Kafelnikov	7–6^{(7–3)}, 6–3
2004	(Belgium) Xavier Malisse (Belgium) Olivier Rochus	(France) Michaël Llodra (France) Fabrice Santoro	7–5, 7–5
2005	(Sweden) Jonas Björkman (Belarus) Max Mirnyi	(United States) Bob Bryan (United States) Mike Bryan	2–6, 6–1, 6–4
2006	(Sweden) Jonas Björkman (Belarus) Max Mirnyi	(United States) Bob Bryan (United States) Mike Bryan	6–7^{(5–7)}, 6–4, 7–5
2007	(The Bahamas) Mark Knowles (Canada) Daniel Nestor	(Czech Republic) Lukáš Dlouhý (Czech Republic) Pavel Vízner	2–6, 6–3, 6–4
2008	(Uruguay) Pablo Cuevas (Peru) Luis Horna	(Canada) Daniel Nestor (Serbia) Nenad Zimonjić	6–2, 6–3
2009	(Czech Republic) Lukáš Dlouhý (India) Leander Paes	(South Africa) Wesley Moodie (Belgium) Dick Norman	3–6, 6–3, 6–2
2010	(Canada) Daniel Nestor (Serbia) Nenad Zimonjić	(Czech Republic) Lukáš Dlouhý (India) Leander Paes	7–5, 6–2
2011	(Belarus) Max Mirnyi (Canada) Daniel Nestor	(Colombia) Juan Sebastián Cabal (Argentina) Eduardo Schwank	7–6^{(7–3)}, 3–6, 6–4
2012	(Belarus) Max Mirnyi (Canada) Daniel Nestor	(United States) Bob Bryan (United States) Mike Bryan	6–4, 6–4
2013	(United States) Bob Bryan (United States) Mike Bryan	(France) Michaël Llodra (France) Nicolas Mahut	6–4, 4–6, 7–6^{(7–4)}
2014	(France) Julien Benneteau (France) Édouard Roger-Vasselin	(Spain) Marcel Granollers (Spain) Marc López	6–3, 7–6^{(7–1)}
2015	(Croatia) Ivan Dodig (Brazil) Marcelo Melo	(United States) Bob Bryan (United States) Mike Bryan	6–7^{(5–7)}, 7–6^{(7–5)}, 7–5
2016	(Spain) Feliciano López (Spain) Marc López	(United States) Bob Bryan (United States) Mike Bryan	6–4, 6–7^{(6–8)}, 6–3
2017	(United States) Ryan Harrison (New Zealand) Michael Venus	(Mexico) Santiago González (United States) Donald Young	7–6^{(7–5)}, 6–7^{(4–7)}, 6–3
2018	(France) Pierre-Hugues Herbert (France) Nicolas Mahut	(Austria) Oliver Marach (Croatia) Mate Pavić	6–2, 7–6^{(7–4)}
2019	(Germany) Kevin Krawietz (Germany) Andreas Mies	(France) Jérémy Chardy (France) Fabrice Martin	6–2, 7–6^{(7–3)}
2020	(Germany) Kevin Krawietz (Germany) Andreas Mies	(Croatia) Mate Pavić (Brazil) Bruno Soares	6–3, 7–5
2021	(France) Pierre-Hugues Herbert (France) Nicolas Mahut	(Kazakhstan) Alexander Bublik (Kazakhstan) Andrey Golubev	4–6, 7–6^{(7–1)}, 6–4
2022	(El Salvador) Marcelo Arévalo (Netherlands) Jean-Julien Rojer	(Croatia) Ivan Dodig (United States) Austin Krajicek	6–7^{(4–7)}, 7–6^{(7–5)}, 6–3
2023	(Croatia) Ivan Dodig (United States) Austin Krajicek	(Belgium) Sander Gillé (Belgium) Joran Vliegen	6–3, 6–1
2024	(El Salvador) Marcelo Arévalo (Croatia) Mate Pavić	(Italy) Simone Bolelli (Italy) Andrea Vavassori	7–5, 6–3
2025	(Spain) Marcel Granollers (Argentina) Horacio Zeballos	(United Kingdom) Joe Salisbury (United Kingdom) Neal Skupski	6–0, 6–7^{(5–7)}, 7–5
2026	(Spain) Marcel Granollers (Argentina) Horacio Zeballos	(Finland) Harri Heliövaara (United Kingdom) Henry Patten	6–4 ,6–2

== Statistics ==
=== Multiple champions ===
Player	Amateur Era	Open Era	All-time	Years
Roy Emerson (AUS)	6	0	6	1960, 1961, 1962, 1963, 1964, 1965
Jean Borotra (FRA)	5	0	5	1925, 1928, 1929, 1934, 1936
Jacques Brugnon (FRA)	5	0	5	1927, 1928, 1930, 1932, 1934
Max Mirnyi (BLR)	0	4	4	2005, 2006, 2011, 2012
Daniel Nestor (CAN)	0	4	4	2007, 2010, 2011, 2012
Henri Cochet (FRA)	3	0	3	1927, 1930, 1932
Tony Trabert (USA)	3	0	3	1950, 1954, 1955
Neale Fraser (AUS)	3	0	3	1958, 1960, 1962
John Newcombe (AUS)	1	2	3	1967, 1969, 1973
Anders Järryd (SWE)	0	3	3	1983, 1987, 1991
Paul Haarhuis (NED)	0	3	3	1995, 1998, 2002
Yevgeny Kafelnikov (RUS)	0	3	3	1996, 1997, 2002
Leander Paes (IND)	0	3	3	1999, 2001, 2009
René Lacoste (FRA)	2	0	2	1925, 1929
Marcel Bernard (FRA)	2	0	2	1936, 1946
Yvon Petra (FRA)	2	0	2	1938, 1946
Ken McGregor (AUS)	2	0	2	1951, 1952
Frank Sedgman (AUS)	2	0	2	1951, 1952
Ken Rosewall (AUS)	1	1	2	1953, 1968
Vic Seixas (USA)	2	0	2	1954, 1955
Ashley Cooper (AUS)	2	0	2	1957, 1958
Fred Stolle (AUS)	1	1	2	1965, 1968
Tony Roche (AUS)	1	1	2	1967, 1969
Raúl Ramírez (MEX)	0	2	2	1975, 1977
Brian Gottfried (USA)	0	2	2	1975, 1977
Sherwood Stewart (USA)	0	2	2	1976, 1982
Gene Mayer (USA)	0	2	2	1978, 1979
Hank Pfister (USA)	0	2	2	1978, 1980
John Fitzgerald (AUS)	0	2	2	1986, 1991
Emilio Sánchez (ESP)	0	2	2	1988, 1990
Jacco Eltingh (NED)	0	2	2	1995, 1998
Daniel Vacek (CZE)	0	2	2	1996, 1997
Mahesh Bhupathi (IND)	0	2	2	1999, 2001
Jonas Björkman (SWE)	0	2	2	2005, 2006
Bob Bryan (USA)	0	2	2	2003, 2013
Mike Bryan (USA)	0	2	2	2003, 2013
Kevin Krawietz (GER)	0	2	2	2019, 2020
Andreas Mies (GER)	0	2	2	2019, 2020
Nicolas Mahut (FRA)	0	2	2	2018, 2021
Pierre-Hugues Herbert (FRA)	0	2	2	2018, 2021
Ivan Dodig (CRO)	0	2	2	2015, 2023

=== Champions by country ===
¤ Former country

Country	Amateur Era	Open Era	All-time	First title	Last title
United States (USA)	17	26	43	1926	2023
Australia (AUS)	26	12	38	1935	2000
France (FRA)	20	8	28	1925	2021
Sweden (SWE)	1	6	7	1948	2006
Netherlands (NED)	0	7	7	1973	2022
Spain (ESP)	1	6	7	1963	2025
Germany (GER)	2	4	6	1937	2020
India (IND)	0	5	5	1999	2009
South Africa (RSA)	2	2	4	1947	1972
Belarus (BLR)	0	4	4	2005	2012
Canada (CAN)	0	4	4	2007	2012
Switzerland (SUI)	0	3	3	1981	1992
Russia (RUS)	0	3	3	1996	2002
Czech Republic (CZE)	0	3	3	1996	2009
Great Britain (GBR)	2	0	2	1933	1933
Czechoslovakia (TCH)	1	1	2	1948	1986
Italy (ITA)	2	0	2	1959	1959
Romania (ROU)	0	2	2	1970	1970
Mexico (MEX)	0	2	2	1975	1977
Belgium (BEL)	0	2	2	2004	2004
New Zealand (NZL)	0	2	2	1974	2017
Croatia (CRO)	0	2	2	2015	2023
Hungary (HUN)	0	1	1	1981	1981
Ecuador (ECU)	0	1	1	1988	1988
Zimbabwe (ZIM)	0	1	1	1994	1994
Bahamas (BAH)	0	1	1	2007	2007
Peru (PER)	0	1	1	2008	2008
Uruguay (URU)	0	1	1	2008	2008
Serbia (SRB)	0	1	1	2010	2010
Brazil (BRA)	0	1	1	2015	2015
El Salvador (ESA)	0	1	1	2022	2022
Argentina (ARG)	0	1	1	2025	2025

- If the doubles partners are from the same country then that country gets two titles instead of one, while if they are from different countries then each country will get one title apiece.

== See also ==
French Open other competitions

- List of French Open men's singles champions
- List of French Open women's singles champions
- List of French Open women's doubles champions
- List of French Open mixed doubles champions

Grand Slam men's doubles

- List of Australian Open men's doubles champions
- List of Wimbledon gentlemen's doubles champions
- List of US Open men's doubles champions
- List of Grand Slam men's doubles champions
