= List of French Open men's singles champions =

French Open Men's Singles Champions
- Location: Paris (Note: In 1909 the tournament was held at the Société Athlétique de la Villa Primrose in Bordeaux.); France
- Venue: Stade Roland Garros
- Governing body: French Tennis Federation
- Created: 1891, (1925 Grand Slam event)
- Editions: 125 events (2026); 96 Grand Slam events (since 1925); 59 events (Open Era)
- Surface: Red clay (since 1908); Sand (1892–1907); Grass (1891)
- Trophy: Coupe des Mousquetaires
- Website: French Open champions

Most titles
- 14: Rafael Nadal

Current champion
- Alexander Zverev (1st title)

The French Open, also known as Roland-Garros, is an annual tennis tournament held over two weeks in May and June. Established in 1891 and played since 1928 on outdoor red clay courts at the Stade Roland Garros in Paris, France, the French Open became a Grand Slam event in 1925. It is one of the four tournaments played each year, the other three being the Australian Open, Wimbledon, and the US Open. Organised by the Fédération Française de Tennis (FFT), the French Open is the second of the four Grand Slam tournaments of the year to be played. In 1968, it was the first Grand Slam tournament to open to non-amateur players.

The winner of the men's singles event receives the Coupe des Mousquetaires, named after The Four Musketeers of French tennis: Jean Borotra, Jacques Brugnon, Henri Cochet, and René Lacoste. The event was not held from 1915 to 1919 because of the First World War and was held unofficially as the Tournoi de France under German occupation from 1941 to 1944, during the Second World War.

Rafael Nadal has won 14 French Open titles which is a record for any player, male or female, in any major tournament. He also holds the record for the most consecutive wins in the Open Era, with five from 2010 to 2014. Max Decugis won eight French Championships prior to the Open Era. Michael Chang became the youngest player in the Open Era to win the French Open when he took the title in 1989 at 17 years, 3 months and 20 days. In contrast, Novak Djokovic is the oldest champion of the Open Era, who won the 2023 French Open at 36 years, twenty days. French players have won the most French Open men's singles titles, with 38 victories, followed by players from Spain (24) and Australia (11). The current champion is Alexander Zverev, who beat Flavio Cobolli in the 2026 final. Alexander Zverev bests Flavio Cobolli in the deciding set to claim a maiden Grand Slam title.

== History ==
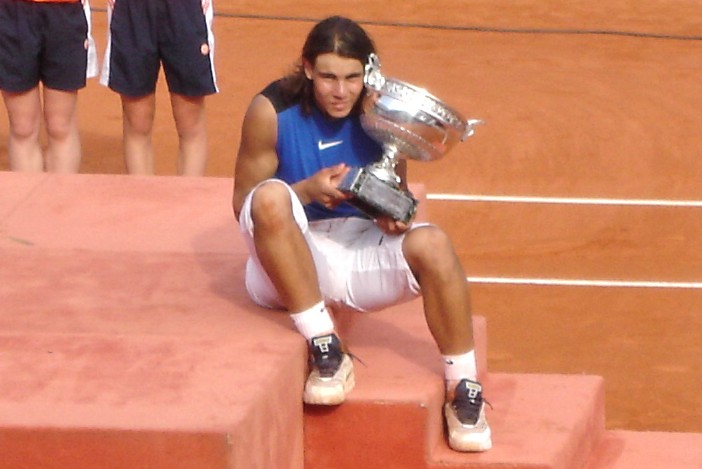
Rafael Nadal, who has won an all-time record fourteen French Open titles. Nadal won four consecutive titles on two separate occasions from 2005 to 2008 and 2017–2020, and an open era record of five consecutive titles from 2010 to 2014.

The French Open was established in 1891 and was originally known as the French Championships. The tournament was only open to French players or foreign players who were a member of a French club during the first 34 years of its existence. The first winner of the Championship was the British player H. Briggs, a member of Club Stade Français which entitled him to compete. Matches were played as the best-of-three sets format until 1902 or 1903, when best-of-five sets was adopted. French players were dominant in the early stages of the tournament, in particular Max Decugis, who won eight titles before the outbreak of the First World War.

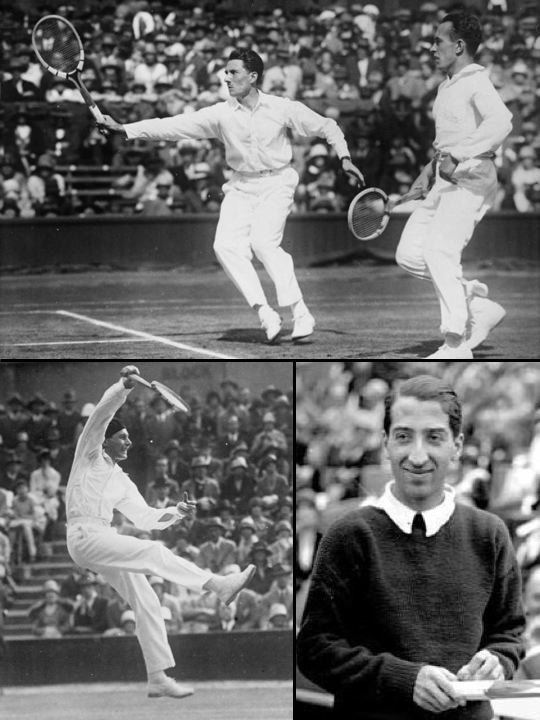
"The Four Musketeers" won a total of eight titles from 1924 to 1932. Since 1981, the French Open's trophy has been named in their honor.

Between 1924 and 1932 the title was won by a member of The Four Musketeers. The championship started to attract the best players after it became an international event in 1925, which was won by René Lacoste. France's victory in the 1927 Davis Cup increased interest in the tournament and required a new stadium to be built. Previously the tournament had alternated between Racing Club and Stade Français at La Faisanderie, before the Stade Roland Garros was built in 1928. Henri Cochet won the first tournament at the new venue.

Jack Crawford's victory in 1933 was the first time a foreign player had won the tournament since 1891. Following his victory, no French players won the title up until 1940, when the tournament was suspended following the outbreak of the Second World War. Don Budge's victory in 1938 was notable, as he won all of the Grand Slam tournaments during the year. Though the event was suspended in 1940, it was held unofficially under the guise of the Tournoi de France. Bernard Destremau won the first two events, while Yvon Petra won three from 1942 to 1945. These results are not recognised by the FFT or other major international organisations and are considered unofficial. Marcel Bernard won the first event after the end of the war in 1946; he was the only Frenchman to win the event before the advent of the Open era in 1968.

No one player dominated the event during this period. Only five players, Frank Parker, Jaroslav Drobný, Tony Trabert, Nicola Pietrangeli and Roy Emerson, won multiple titles. The tournament became an Open in 1968, as professional players were allowed to compete with amateurs, previously only amateurs could compete in the Grand Slam tournaments. The tournament, won by Australian Ken Rosewall, was the first Grand Slam tournament to be played in the Open era.

Swede Björn Borg won the majority of the tournaments in the early years of the Open era. He won consecutive titles in 1974 and 1975, before winning four successive titles from 1978 to 1981. Yannick Noah became the first Frenchman to win the event since 1946, when he won in 1983. Ivan Lendl won his first title in 1984, before losing the following year to Wilander in the final and won two consecutive titles in 1986 and 1987. Michael Chang became the youngest man to win the French Open when he beat Stefan Edberg in 1989.

American Jim Courier won consecutive titles in 1991 and 1992 before Spaniard Sergi Bruguera repeated the feat in 1993 and 1994. Gustavo Kuerten won three titles in 1997, 2000 and 2001. 2005 marked Rafael Nadal's first French Open; he won four consecutive titles from 2005 to 2008. Nadal was beaten in the round of 16 of the 2009 tournament by Robin Söderling who lost to Roger Federer in the final. Nadal regained the title in 2010 and defended his crowns in 2011, 2012, 2013, and 2014. In the 2015 event, he was knocked out in the quarter-finals by Novak Djokovic, who eventually lost in the final to Stan Wawrinka. Nadal would again win four straight titles from 2017 to 2020.

== Finals ==
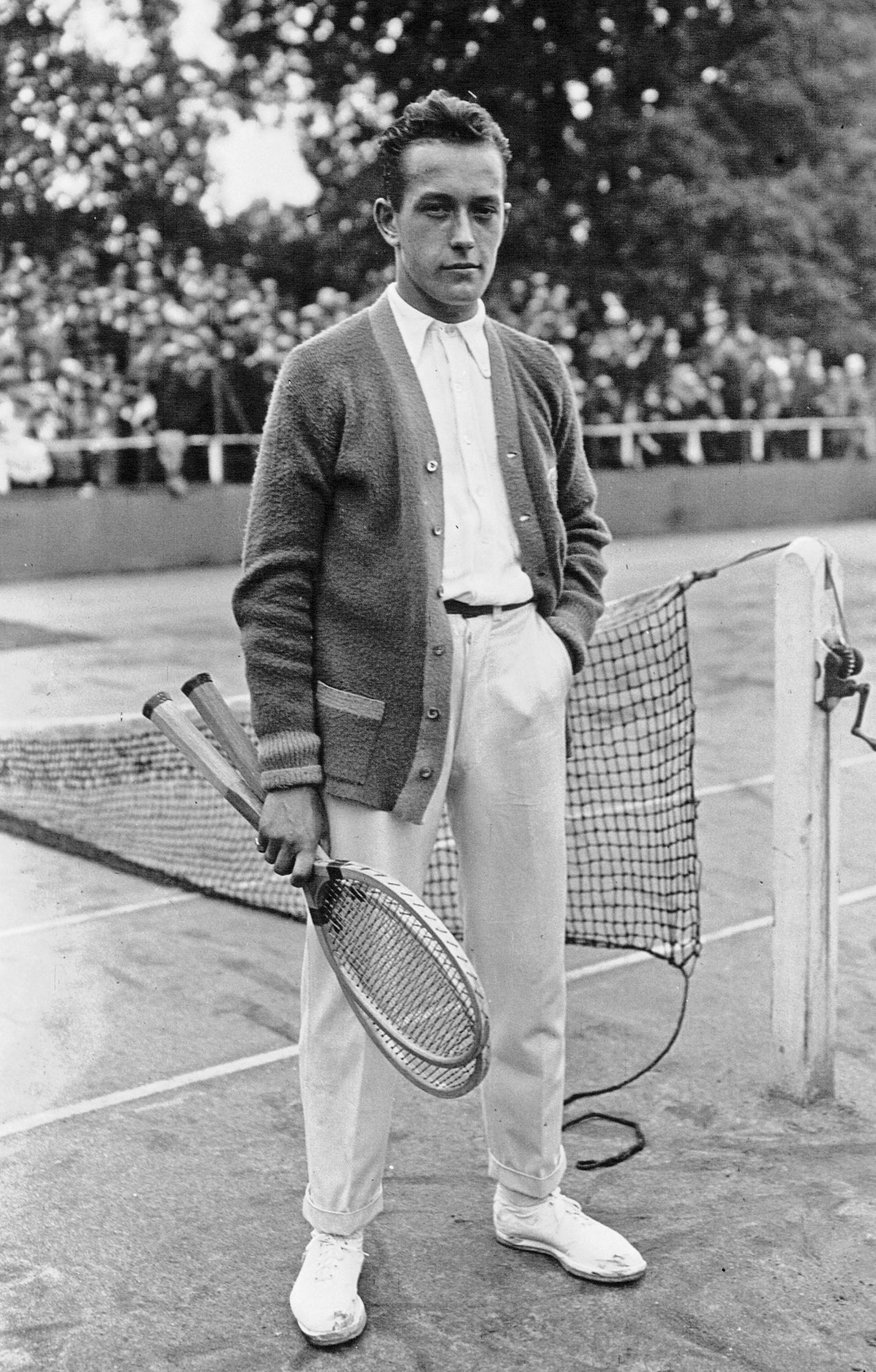
Henri Cochet, the most successful French player since the tournament became open in 1925. He won five titles between 1922 and 1932.

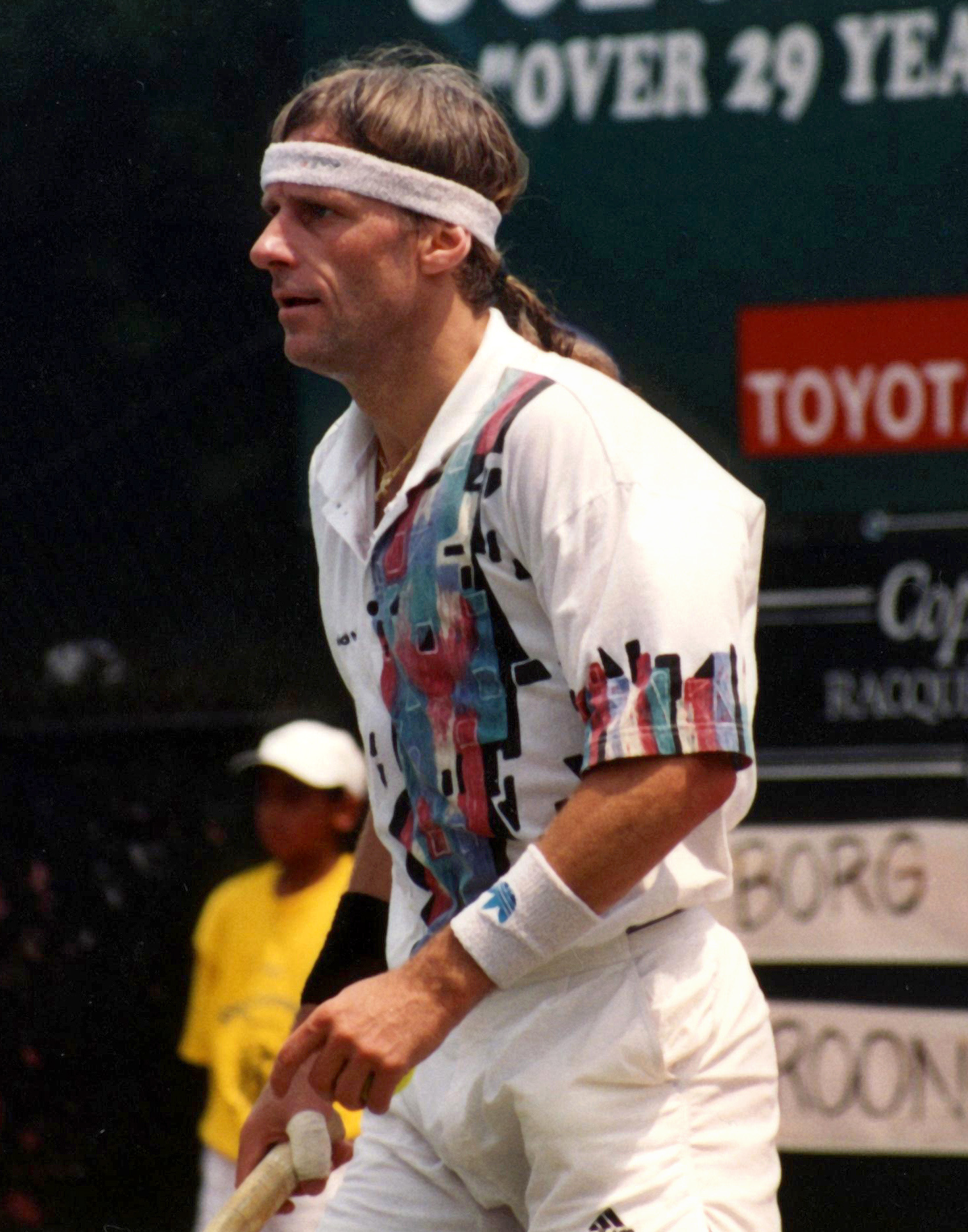
Björn Borg won six titles from 1974 to 1981.

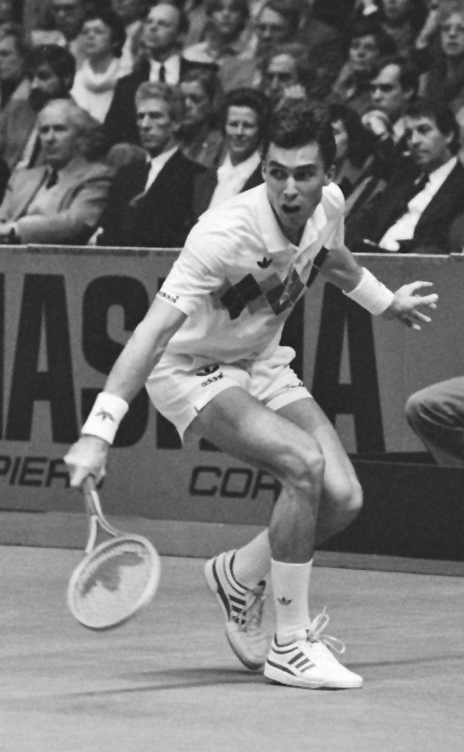
Ivan Lendl won three titles and made two more finals.

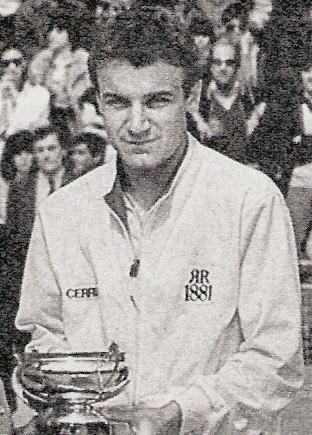
Mats Wilander won three titles in his career.

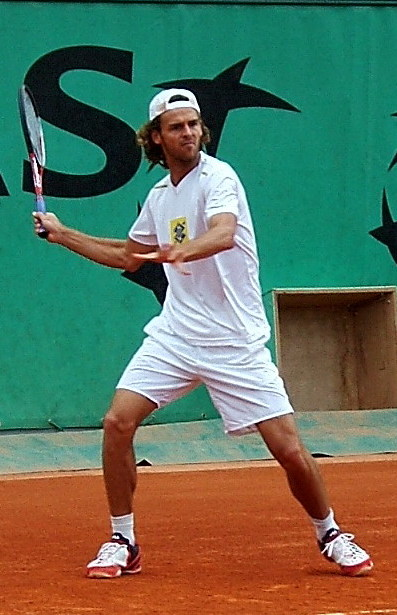
Gustavo Kuerten won all three of his major trophies at the French Open.

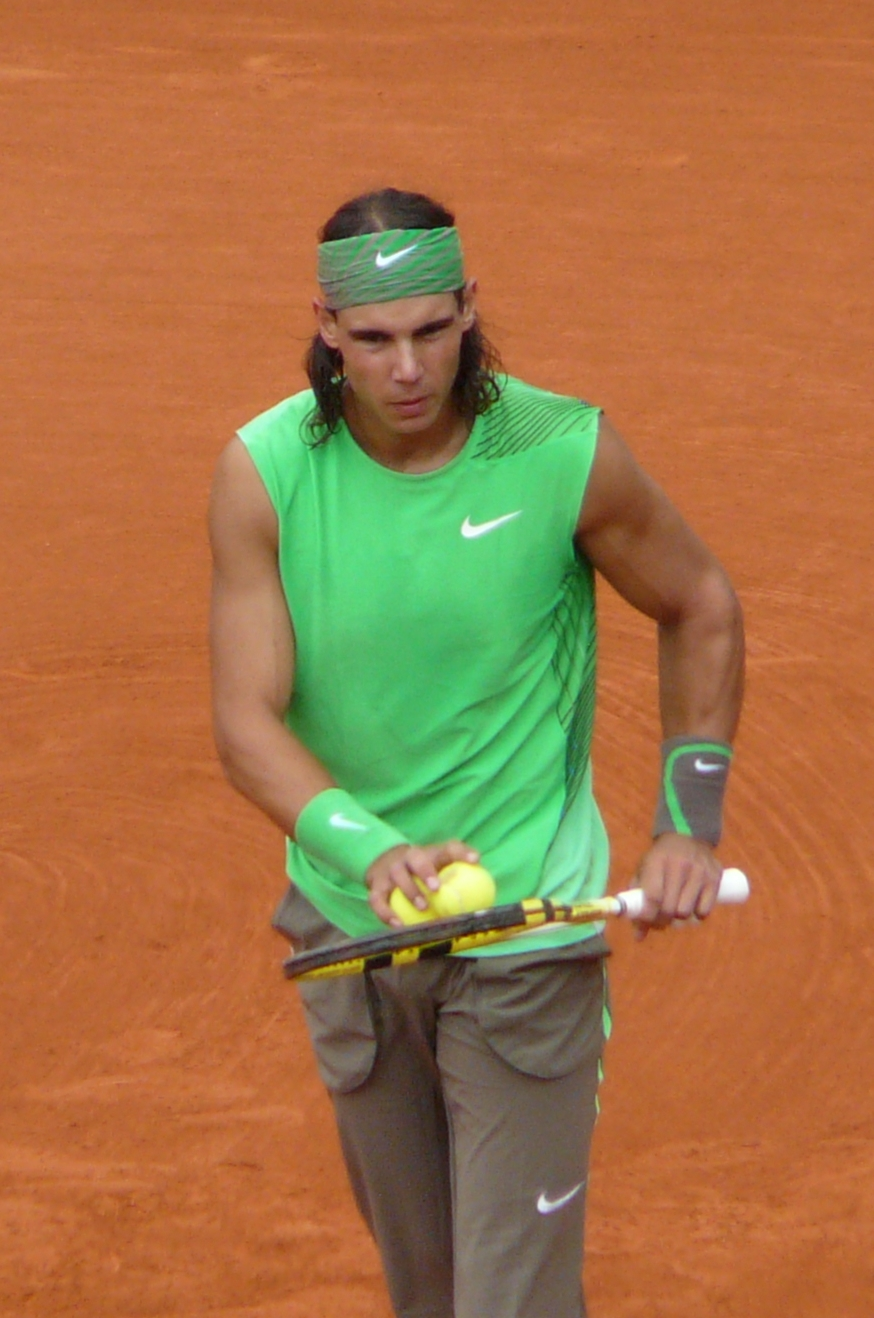
Rafael Nadal is the record fourteen-time champion. He holds a 112–4 win–loss record at the event.

Key
† A French club members only-tournament called the French Championships. Non-Grand Slam event. (Note: The World Hard Court Championships which was held in Paris on clay courts, has often been considered the true precursor to the French Open.)
†† Disputed champions: Not sanctioned or recognised by the FFT. Non-Grand Slam event. (Note: Due to World War II, the tournaments held from 1941 to 1945 are not officially recognized by the Fédération Française de Tennis. Consequently, despite being listed by a few sources, the champions from those years are not included in the official statistics. They are listed here as a historical note.)

=== French Championships ===
| Year | Country | Champion | Country | Runner-up | Score in the final (Note: The dash means that the result or score is unknown because there are no available sources for this information Pre-1914.) |
|---|---|---|---|---|---|
French Championships – Non-Grand Slam event (1891–1924)
| 1891 | BRI (Note: One win by a player from the United Kingdom of Great Britain and Ireland (1801–1922), plus one win by a player from the United Kingdom of Great Britain and Northern Ireland (1922–present).) | H. Briggs † | FRA | P. Baigneres | 6–3, 6–4 |
| 1892 | FRA | Jean Schopfer † | USA | Francis L. Fassitt | 6–2, 1–6, 6–2 |
| 1893 | FRA | Laurent Riboulet † | FRA | Jean Schopfer | 6–3, 6–3 |
| 1894 | FRA | André Vacherot (1/4) † | FRA | Gérard Brosselin | 1–6, 6–3, 6–3 |
| 1895 | FRA | André Vacherot (2/4) † | FRA | Laurent Riboulet | 9–7, 6–2 |
| 1896 | FRA | André Vacherot (3/4) † | FRA | Gérard Brosselin | 6–1, 7–5 |
| 1897 | FRA | Paul Aymé (1/4) † | BRI | Francky Wardan | 4–6, 6–4, 6–2 |
| 1898 | FRA | Paul Aymé (2/4) † | FRA | Paul Lebreton | 5–7, 6–1, 6–2 |
| 1899 | FRA | Paul Aymé (3/4) † | FRA | Paul Lebreton | 9–7, 3–6, 6–3 |
| 1900 | FRA | Paul Aymé (4/4) † | FRA | André Prévost | 6–3, 6–0 |
| 1901 | FRA | André Vacherot (4/4) † | FRA | Paul Lebreton | 2-6, 6-2, 6-2 |
| 1902 | FRA | Marcel Vacherot † | FRA | Max Decugis | 6–4, 6–2 |
| 1903 | FRA | Max Decugis (1/8) † | FRA | André Vacherot | 6–3, 6–2 |
| 1904 | FRA | Max Decugis (2/8) † | FRA | André Vacherot | 6–2, 8–6, 8–10, 6–1 |
| 1905 | FRA | Maurice Germot (1/3) † | FRA | André Vacherot | 4-6, 6-4, 6-3, 6-3 |
| 1906 | FRA | Maurice Germot (2/3) † | FRA | Max Decugis | 5–7, 6–3, 6–4, 1–6, 6–3 |
| 1907 | FRA | Max Decugis (3/8) † | FRA | Robert Wallet | 6-0, 6-3, 6-1 |
| 1908 | FRA | Max Decugis (4/8) † | FRA | Maurice Germot | 6–2, 6–1, 3–6, 10–8 |
| 1909 | FRA | Max Decugis (5/8) † | FRA | Maurice Germot | 3–6, 2–6, 6–4, 6–4, 6–4 |
| 1910 | FRA | Maurice Germot (3/3) † | FRA | François Blanchy | 6–1, 6–3, 4–6, 6–3 |
| 1911 | FRA | André Gobert (1/2) † | FRA | Maurice Germot | 6–1, 8–6, 7–5 |
| 1912 | FRA | Max Decugis (6/8) † | FRA | André Gobert | 6-1,7-5,6-0 |
| 1913 | FRA | Max Decugis (7/8) † | FRA | Georges Gault | 6–1, 6–3, 6–4 |
| 1914 | FRA | Max Decugis (8/8) † | FRA | Jean Samazeuilh | 3–6, 6–1, 6–4, 6–4 |
| 1915 | No competition (due to World War I) (Note: The tournament was not held from 1915 to 1919 because of World War I.) | | | | |
| 1916 | No competition (due to World War I) | | | | |
| 1917 | No competition (due to World War I) | | | | |
| 1918 | No competition (due to World War I) | | | | |
| 1919 | No competition (due to World War I) | | | | |
| 1920 | FRA | André Gobert (2/2) † | FRA | Max Decugis | 6–3, 3–6, 1–6, 6–2, 6–3 |
| 1921 | FRA | Jean Samazeuilh † | FRA | André Gobert | 6–3, 6–3, 2–6, 7–5 |
| 1922 | FRA | Henri Cochet (1/5) † | FRA | Jean Samazeuilh | 8–6, 6–3, 7–5 |
| 1923 | FRA | François Blanchy † | FRA | Max Decugis | 1–6, 6–2, 6–0, 6–2 |
| 1924 | FRA | Jean Borotra (1/2) † | FRA | René Lacoste | 7–5, 6–4, 0–6, 5–7, 6–2 |
Grand Slam event (1925–1939)
| 1925 | FRA | René Lacoste (1/3) | FRA | Jean Borotra | 7–5, 6–1, 6–4 |
| 1926 | FRA | Henri Cochet (2/5) | FRA | René Lacoste | 6–2, 6–4, 6–3 |
| 1927 | FRA | René Lacoste (2/3) | USA | Bill Tilden | 6–4, 4–6, 5–7, 6–3, 11–9 |
| 1928 | FRA | Henri Cochet (3/5) | FRA | René Lacoste | 5–7, 6–3, 6–1, 6–3 |
| 1929 | FRA | René Lacoste (3/3) | FRA | Jean Borotra | 6–3, 2–6, 6–0, 2–6, 8–6 |
| 1930 | FRA | Henri Cochet (4/5) | USA | Bill Tilden | 3–6, 8–6, 6–3, 6–1 |
| 1931 | FRA | Jean Borotra (2/2) | FRA | Christian Boussus | 2–6, 6–4, 7–5, 6–4 |
| 1932 | FRA | Henri Cochet (5/5) | ITA | Giorgio de Stefani | 6–0, 6–4, 4–6, 6–3 |
| 1933 | AUS | Jack Crawford | FRA | Henri Cochet | 8–6, 6–1, 6–3 |
| 1934 | GER | Gottfried von Cramm (1/2) | AUS | Jack Crawford | 6–4, 7–9, 3–6, 7–5, 6–3 |
| 1935 | GBR | Fred Perry | GER | Gottfried von Cramm | 6–3, 3–6, 6–1, 6–3 |
| 1936 | GER | Gottfried von Cramm (2/2) | GBR | Fred Perry | 6–0, 2–6, 6–2, 2–6, 6–0 |
| 1937 | GER | Henner Henkel | GBR | Bunny Austin | 6–1, 6–4, 6–3 |
| 1938 | USA | Don Budge | TCH | Roderich Menzel | 6–3, 6–2, 6–4 |
| 1939 | USA | Don McNeill | USA | Bobby Riggs | 7–5, 6–0, 6–3 |
| 1940 | No competition (due to World War II) | | | | |
Tournoi de France – Unofficial tournament (1941–1945)
| 1941 | FRA | Bernard Destremau †† | FRA | Robert Ramillon | 6–4, 2–6, 6–3, 6–4 |
| 1942 | FRA | Bernard Destremau †† | FRA | Christian Boussus | 5–7, 6–4, 6–4, 6–1 |
| 1943 | FRA | Yvon Petra †† | FRA | Henri Cochet | 6–3, 6–3, 6–8, 2–6, 6–4 |
| 1944 | FRA | Yvon Petra †† | FRA | Marcel Bernard | 6–1, 4–6, 4–6, 7–5, 6–2 |
| 1945 | FRA | Yvon Petra †† | FRA | Bernard Destremau | 7–5, 6–4, 6–2 |
Grand Slam event (1946–present)
| 1946 | FRA | Marcel Bernard | TCH | Jaroslav Drobný | 3–6, 2–6, 6–1, 6–4, 6–3 |
| 1947 | HUN | József Asbóth | RSA | Eric Sturgess | 8–6, 7–5, 6–4 |
| 1948 | USA | Frank Parker (1/2) | TCH | Jaroslav Drobný | 6–4, 7–5, 5–7, 8–6 |
| 1949 | USA | Frank Parker (2/2) | USA | Budge Patty | 6–3, 1–6, 6–1, 6–4 |
| 1950 | USA | Budge Patty | EGY | Jaroslav Drobný | 6–1, 6–2, 3–6, 5–7, 7–5 |
| 1951 | EGY | Jaroslav Drobný (1/2) | RSA | Eric Sturgess | 6–3, 6–3, 6–3 |
| 1952 | EGY | Jaroslav Drobný (2/2) | AUS | Frank Sedgman | 6–2, 6–0, 3–6, 6–4 |
| 1953 | AUS | Ken Rosewall (1/2) | USA | Vic Seixas | 6–3, 6–4, 1–6, 6–2 |
| 1954 | USA | Tony Trabert (1/2) | USA | Arthur Larsen | 6–4, 7–5, 6–1 |
| 1955 | USA | Tony Trabert (2/2) | SWE | Sven Davidson | 2–6, 6–1, 6–4, 6–2 |
| 1956 | AUS | Lew Hoad | SWE | Sven Davidson | 6–4, 8–6, 6–3 |
| 1957 | SWE | Sven Davidson | USA | Herbert Flam | 6–3, 6–4, 6–4 |
| 1958 | AUS | Mervyn Rose | CHI | Luis Ayala | 6–3, 6–4, 6–4 |
| 1959 | ITA | Nicola Pietrangeli (1/2) | RSA | Ian Vermaak | 3–6, 6–3, 6–4, 6–1 |
| 1960 | ITA | Nicola Pietrangeli (2/2) | CHI | Luis Ayala | 3–6, 6–3, 6–4, 4–6, 6–3 |
| 1961 | ESP | Manuel Santana (1/2) | ITA | Nicola Pietrangeli | 4–6, 6–1, 3–6, 6–0, 6–2 |
| 1962 | AUS | Rod Laver (1/2) | AUS | Roy Emerson | 3–6, 2–6, 6–3, 9–7, 6–2 |
| 1963 | AUS | Roy Emerson (1/2) | FRA | Pierre Darmon | 3–6, 6–1, 6–4, 6–4 |
| 1964 | ESP | Manuel Santana (2/2) | ITA | Nicola Pietrangeli | 6–3, 6–1, 4–6, 7–5 |
| 1965 | AUS | Fred Stolle | AUS | Tony Roche | 3–6, 6–0, 6–2, 6–3 |
| 1966 | AUS | Tony Roche | HUN | István Gulyás | 6–1, 6–4, 7–5 |
| 1967 | AUS | Roy Emerson (2/2) | AUS | Tony Roche | 6–1, 6–4, 2–6, 6–2 |

=== French Open ===
| Year | Country | Champion | Country | Runner-up | Score in the final |
|---|---|---|---|---|---|
| 1968 | AUS | Ken Rosewall (2/2) | AUS | Rod Laver | 6–3, 6–1, 2–6, 6–2 |
| 1969 | AUS | Rod Laver (2/2) | AUS | Ken Rosewall | 6–4, 6–3, 6–4 |
| 1970 | TCH | Jan Kodeš (1/2) | YUG | Željko Franulović | 6–2, 6–4, 6–0 |
| 1971 | TCH | Jan Kodeš (2/2) | ROU | Ilie Năstase | 8–6, 6–2, 2–6, 7–5 |
| 1972 | ESP | Andrés Gimeno | FRA | Patrick Proisy | 4–6, 6–3, 6–1, 6–1 |
| 1973 | ROU | Ilie Năstase | YUG | Nikola Pilić | 6–3, 6–3, 6–0 |
| 1974 | SWE | Björn Borg (1/6) | ESP | Manuel Orantes | 2–6, 6–7^{(4–7)}, (Note: Set score in parentheses indicates a tiebreaker score.) 6–0, 6–1, 6–1 |
| 1975 | SWE | Björn Borg (2/6) | ARG | Guillermo Vilas | 6–2, 6–3, 6–4 |
| 1976 | ITA | Adriano Panatta | USA | Harold Solomon | 6–1, 6–4, 4–6, 7–6^{(7–3)} |
| 1977 | ARG | Guillermo Vilas | USA | Brian Gottfried | 6–0, 6–3, 6–0 |
| 1978 | SWE | Björn Borg (3/6) | ARG | Guillermo Vilas | 6–1, 6–1, 6–3 |
| 1979 | SWE | Björn Borg (4/6) | PAR | Víctor Pecci | 6–3, 6–1, 6–7^{(6–8)}, 6–4 |
| 1980 | SWE | Björn Borg (5/6) | USA | Vitas Gerulaitis | 6–4, 6–1, 6–2 |
| 1981 | SWE | Björn Borg (6/6) | TCH | Ivan Lendl | 6–1, 4–6, 6–2, 3–6, 6–1 |
| 1982 | SWE | Mats Wilander (1/3) | ARG | Guillermo Vilas | 1–6, 7–6^{(8–6)}, 6–0, 6–4 |
| 1983 | FRA | Yannick Noah | SWE | Mats Wilander | 6–2, 7–5, 7–6^{(7–3)} |
| 1984 | TCH | Ivan Lendl (1/3) | USA | John McEnroe | 3–6, 2–6, 6–4, 7–5, 7–5 |
| 1985 | SWE | Mats Wilander (2/3) | TCH | Ivan Lendl | 3–6, 6–4, 6–2, 6–2 |
| 1986 | TCH | Ivan Lendl (2/3) | SWE | Mikael Pernfors | 6–3, 6–2, 6–4 |
| 1987 | TCH | Ivan Lendl (3/3) | SWE | Mats Wilander | 7–5, 6–2, 3–6, 7–6^{(7–3)} |
| 1988 | SWE | Mats Wilander (3/3) | FRA | Henri Leconte | 7–5, 6–2, 6–1 |
| 1989 | USA | Michael Chang | SWE | Stefan Edberg | 6–1, 3–6, 4–6, 6–4, 6–2 |
| 1990 | ECU | Andrés Gómez | USA | Andre Agassi | 6–3, 2–6, 6–4, 6–4 |
| 1991 | USA | Jim Courier (1/2) | USA | Andre Agassi | 3–6, 6–4, 2–6, 6–1, 6–4 |
| 1992 | USA | Jim Courier (2/2) | TCH | Petr Korda | 7–5, 6–2, 6–1 |
| 1993 | ESP | Sergi Bruguera (1/2) | USA | Jim Courier | 6–4, 2–6, 6–2, 3–6, 6–3 |
| 1994 | ESP | Sergi Bruguera (2/2) | ESP | Alberto Berasategui | 6–3, 7–5, 2–6, 6–1 |
| 1995 | AUT | Thomas Muster | USA | Michael Chang | 7–5, 6–2, 6–4 |
| 1996 | RUS | Yevgeny Kafelnikov | GER | Michael Stich | 7–6^{(7–4)}, 7–5, 7–6^{(7–4)} |
| 1997 | BRA | Gustavo Kuerten (1/3) | ESP | Sergi Bruguera | 6–3, 6–4, 6–2 |
| 1998 | ESP | Carlos Moyá | ESP | Àlex Corretja | 6–3, 7–5, 6–3 |
| 1999 | USA | Andre Agassi | UKR | Andrei Medvedev | 1–6, 2–6, 6–4, 6–3, 6–4 |
| 2000 | BRA | Gustavo Kuerten (2/3) | SWE | Magnus Norman | 6–2, 6–3, 2–6, 7–6^{(8–6)} |
| 2001 | BRA | Gustavo Kuerten (3/3) | ESP | Àlex Corretja | 6–7^{(3–7)}, 7–5, 6–2, 6–0 |
| 2002 | ESP | Albert Costa | ESP | Juan Carlos Ferrero | 6–1, 6–0, 4–6, 6–3 |
| 2003 | ESP | Juan Carlos Ferrero | NED | Martin Verkerk | 6–1, 6–3, 6–2 |
| 2004 | ARG | Gastón Gaudio | ARG | Guillermo Coria | 0–6, 3–6, 6–4, 6–1, 8–6 |
| 2005 | ESP | Rafael Nadal | ARG | Mariano Puerta | 6–7^{(6–8)}, 6–3, 6–1, 7–5 |
| 2006 | ESP | Rafael Nadal (2/14) | SUI | Roger Federer | 1–6, 6–1, 6–4, 7–6^{(7–4)} |
| 2007 | ESP | Rafael Nadal (3/14) | SUI | Roger Federer | 6–3, 4–6, 6–3, 6–4 |
| 2008 | ESP | Rafael Nadal (4/14) | SUI | Roger Federer | 6–1, 6–3, 6–0 |
| 2009 | SUI | Roger Federer | SWE | Robin Söderling | 6–1, 7–6^{(7–1)}, 6–4 |
| 2010 | ESP | Rafael Nadal (5/14) | SWE | Robin Söderling | 6–4, 6–2, 6–4 |
| 2011 | ESP | Rafael Nadal (6/14) | SUI | Roger Federer | 7–5, 7–6^{(7–3)}, 5–7, 6–1 |
| 2012 | ESP | Rafael Nadal (7/14) | SRB | Novak Djokovic | 6–4, 6–3, 2–6, 7–5 |
| 2013 | ESP | Rafael Nadal (8/14) | ESP | David Ferrer | 6–3, 6–2, 6–3 |
| 2014 | ESP | Rafael Nadal (9/14) | SRB | Novak Djokovic | 3–6, 7–5, 6–2, 6–4 |
| 2015 | SUI | Stan Wawrinka | SRB | Novak Djokovic | 4–6, 6–4, 6–3, 6–4 |
| 2016 | SRB | Novak Djokovic (1/3) | GBR | Andy Murray | 3–6, 6–1, 6–2, 6–4 |
| 2017 | ESP | Rafael Nadal (10/14) | SUI | Stan Wawrinka | 6–2, 6–3, 6–1 |
| 2018 | ESP | Rafael Nadal (11/14) | AUT | Dominic Thiem | 6–4, 6–3, 6–2 |
| 2019 | ESP | Rafael Nadal (12/14) | AUT | Dominic Thiem | 6–3, 5–7, 6–1, 6–1 |
| 2020 | ESP | Rafael Nadal (13/14) | SRB | Novak Djokovic | 6–0, 6–2, 7–5 |
| 2021 | SRB | Novak Djokovic (2/3) | GRE | Stefanos Tsitsipas | 6–7^{(6–8)}, 2–6, 6–3, 6–2, 6–4 |
| 2022 | ESP | Rafael Nadal (14/14) | NOR | Casper Ruud | 6–3, 6–3, 6–0 |
| 2023 | SRB | Novak Djokovic (3/3) | NOR | Casper Ruud | 7–6^{(7–1)}, 6–3, 7–5 |
| 2024 | ESP | Carlos Alcaraz (1/2) | GER | Alexander Zverev | 6–3, 2–6, 5–7, 6–1, 6–2 |
| 2025 | ESP | Carlos Alcaraz (2/2) | ITA | Jannik Sinner | 4–6, 6–7^{(4–7)}, 6–4, 7–6^{(7–3)}, 7–6^{(10–2)} |
| 2026 | GER | Alexander Zverev | ITA | Flavio Cobolli | 6–1, 4–6, 6–4, 6–7^{(5–7)}, 6–1 |

== Statistics ==
=== Multiple champions ===
- Competitions prior to 1925 not counted as Grand Slam wins as only French tennis club members and French nationals could play. (denoted in italics).

| Player | Amateur Era | Open Era | All-time | Years |
|---|---|---|---|---|
| Rafael Nadal (ESP) | 0 | 14 | 14 | 2005, 2006, 2007, 2008, 2010, 2011, 2012, 2013, 2014, 2017, 2018, 2019, 2020, 2022 |
| Max Decugis (FRA) | 8 | 0 | 8 | 1903, 1904, 1907, 1908, 1909, 1912, 1913, 1914 |
| Björn Borg (SWE) | 0 | 6 | 6 | 1974, 1975, 1978, 1979, 1980, 1981 |
| Henri Cochet (FRA) | 5 | 0 | 5 | 1922, 1926, 1928, 1930, 1932 |
| André Vacherot (FRA) | 4 | 0 | 4 | 1894, 1895, 1896, 1901 |
| Paul Aymé (FRA) | 4 | 0 | 4 | 1897, 1898, 1899, 1900 |
| Maurice Germot (FRA) | 3 | 0 | 3 | 1905, 1906, 1910 |
| René Lacoste (FRA) | 3 | 0 | 3 | 1925, 1927, 1929 |
| Mats Wilander (SWE) | 0 | 3 | 3 | 1982, 1985, 1988 |
| Ivan Lendl (TCH) | 0 | 3 | 3 | 1984, 1986, 1987 |
| Gustavo Kuerten (BRA) | 0 | 3 | 3 | 1997, 2000, 2001 |
| Novak Djokovic (SRB) | 0 | 3 | 3 | 2016, 2021, 2023 |
| André Gobert (FRA) | 2 | 0 | 2 | 1911, 1920 |
| Jean Borotra (FRA) | 2 | 0 | 2 | 1924, 1931 |
| Gottfried von Cramm (GER) | 2 | 0 | 2 | 1934, 1936 |
| Frank Parker (USA) | 2 | 0 | 2 | 1948, 1949 |
| Jaroslav Drobný (EGY) | 2 | 0 | 2 | 1951, 1952 |
| Ken Rosewall (AUS) | 1 | 1 | 2 | 1953, 1968 |
| Tony Trabert (USA) | 2 | 0 | 2 | 1954, 1955 |
| Nicola Pietrangeli (ITA) | 2 | 0 | 2 | 1959, 1960 |
| Manuel Santana (ESP) | 2 | 0 | 2 | 1961, 1964 |
| Rod Laver (AUS) | 1 | 1 | 2 | 1962, 1969 |
| Roy Emerson (AUS) | 2 | 0 | 2 | 1963, 1967 |
| Jan Kodeš (TCH) | 0 | 2 | 2 | 1970, 1971 |
| Jim Courier (USA) | 0 | 2 | 2 | 1991, 1992 |
| Sergi Bruguera (ESP) | 0 | 2 | 2 | 1993, 1994 |
| Carlos Alcaraz (ESP) | 0 | 2 | 2 | 2024, 2025 |

=== Champions by country ===
| Country | Amateur Era | Open Era | All-time | First title | Last title |
|---|---|---|---|---|---|
| France (FRA) | 37 | 1 | 38 | 1892 | 1983 |
| Spain (ESP) | 2 | 22 | 24 | 1961 | 2025 |
| Australia (AUS) | 9 | 2 | 11 | 1933 | 1969 |
| United States (USA) | 7 | 4 | 11 | 1938 | 1999 |
| Sweden (SWE) | 1 | 9 | 10 | 1957 | 1988 |
| Czechoslovakia (TCH) (Note: Czechoslovakia (TCH, 1918–1992), evolved into Czech Republic (CZE, 1992–present) and Slovakia (SVK, 1992–present).) | 0 | 5 | 5 | 1970 | 1987 |
| Germany (GER) | 3 | 1 | 4 | 1934 | 2026 |
| Italy (ITA) | 2 | 1 | 3 | 1959 | 1976 |
| Brazil (BRA) | 0 | 3 | 3 | 1997 | 2001 |
| Serbia (SRB) | 0 | 3 | 3 | 2016 | 2023 |
| Great Britain (GBR) | 2 | 0 | 2 | 1891 | 1935 |
| Egypt (EGY) | 2 | 0 | 2 | 1951 | 1952 |
| Argentina (ARG) | 0 | 2 | 2 | 1977 | 2004 |
| Switzerland (SUI) | 0 | 2 | 2 | 2009 | 2015 |
| Hungary (HUN) | 1 | 0 | 1 | 1947 | 1947 |
| Romania (ROU) | 0 | 1 | 1 | 1973 | 1973 |
| Ecuador (ECU) | 0 | 1 | 1 | 1990 | 1990 |
| Austria (AUT) | 0 | 1 | 1 | 1995 | 1995 |
| Russia (RUS) | 0 | 1 | 1 | 1996 | 1996 |

== See also ==
French Open other competitions

- List of French Open women's singles champions
- List of French Open men's doubles champions
- List of French Open women's doubles champions
- List of French Open mixed doubles champions

Grand Slam men's singles

- List of Australian Open men's singles champions
- List of Wimbledon gentlemen's singles champions
- List of US Open men's singles champions
- List of Grand Slam men's singles champions

Other events

- French Pro Championship
- World Hard Court Championships

== Footnotes ==
General

- "Past Champions (Men & Women)". Roland Garros.
- "French Open Men's champions". GrandSlamHistory. Archived from the original on 8 May 2021.

Specific

== Sources ==
- Gillmeister, Heiner (1998). Tennis: A Cultural History (Repr. ed.). London: Leicester University Press. ISBN 978-0718501952.
- Robertson, Max; Kramer, Jack (1974). The Encyclopedia Of Tennis: 100 Years Of Great Players And Events. Studio. ISBN 978-0670294084.
