= 2008 French Open =

- Date: 25 May – 8 June 2008
- Edition: 107
- Category: 78th Grand Slam (ITF)
- Surface: Clay / outdoor
- Location: Paris (XVI^{e}), France
- Venue: Stade Roland Garros

Champions

Men's singles
- (Spain) Rafael Nadal

Women's singles
- (Serbia) Ana Ivanovic

Men's doubles
- (Uruguay) Pablo Cuevas / (Peru) Luis Horna

Women's doubles
- (Spain) Anabel Medina Garrigues / (Spain) Virginia Ruano Pascual

Mixed doubles
- (Belarus) Victoria Azarenka / (United States) Bob Bryan

Wheelchair men's singles
- (Japan) Shingo Kunieda

Wheelchair women's singles
- (Netherlands) Esther Vergeer

Wheelchair men's doubles
- (Japan) Shingo Kunieda / (Netherlands) Maikel Scheffers

Wheelchair women's doubles
- (Netherlands) Jiske Griffioen / (Netherlands) Esther Vergeer

Boys' singles
- (Chinese Taipei) Yang Tsung-hua

Girls' singles
- (Romania) Simona Halep

Boys' doubles
- (Finland) Henri Kontinen / (Indonesia) Christopher Rungkat

Girls' doubles
- (Slovenia) Polona Hercog / (Australia) Jessica Moore

Legends under 45 doubles
- (Croatia) Goran Ivanišević / (Germany) Michael Stich

Legends over 45 doubles
- (Sweden) Anders Järryd / (United States) John McEnroe
- French Open

The 2008 French Open was a tennis tournament played on outdoor clay courts. It was the 107th edition of the French Open, and the second Grand Slam event of the year. It took place at the Stade Roland Garros in Paris, France, from 25 May until 8 June 2008.

Justine Henin did not defend her trophy due to her retirement from the sport on May 14. Ana Ivanovic, the runner-up to Henin in 2007, won the Women's Singles. On the men's side, Rafael Nadal won the Men's Singles, and equalled Björn Borg's record of four consecutive French Open titles in the Open Era. Other competitions included men and women's doubles, junior singles and doubles as well as wheelchair and 'veteran' competitions.

The 2008 edition marked the first time in the Open Era no American man or woman reached the singles' quarterfinals at Roland Garros.

== Notable stories ==
=== Justine Henin's retirement ===
On May 14, 2008, less than two weeks before the start of the 2008 French Open, defending champion and world No. 1 Justine Henin, announced in a press conference her immediate retirement from the sport. Four-time winner in Roland-Garros, where she defeated Kim Clijsters in 2003, Mary Pierce in 2005, Svetlana Kuznetsova in 2006 and Ana Ivanovic in 2007, Henin became the first player, at 25, to stop her career while holding the number one rank. Despite undergoing a poor run in the 2008 season, Henin was still considered to be a strong favourite for the French Open crown. Her retirement left Serena Williams, the 2002 champion and the tournament favourite this year, as the only former French Open champion remaining in the women's draw, and allowed WTA world No. 2 Maria Sharapova to be installed as the new world No. 1, and become the top seed for the tournament. Henin's last match was against Dinara Safina, who went on to have a successful French Open, reaching the final, where she was beaten by Ana Ivanovic. Henin returned at the end of the women's tournament, and presented new champion Ana Ivanovic with the trophy.

=== The Williams' sisters performance ===
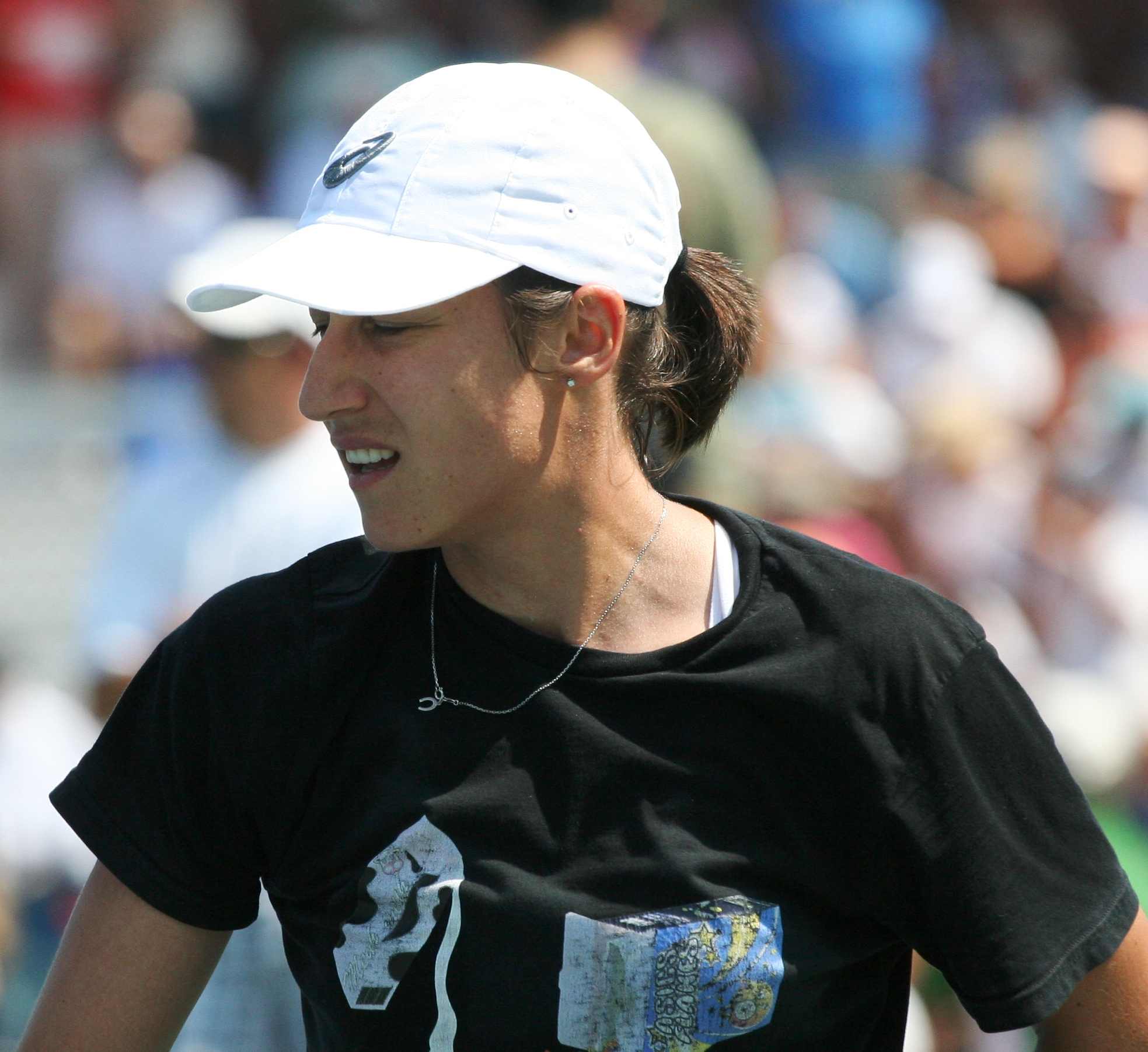
Katarina Srebotnik knocked Serena Williams out of the French Open in the third round. Her triumph ensured that there would be a new champion in 2008.

This tournament saw the worst performance by any of the Williams sisters at a Grand Slam tournament since the 2006 Australian Open.

Serena Williams, the only former French Open champion left in the draw, was stunned in the third round by Katarina Srebotnik, ensuring that there would be a new champion this year. Williams had never previously lost to Srebotnik in four previous attempts, and had defeated her in the second round of the 2001 French Open and as recently as in the third round of the 2008 Family Circle Cup, where she won the title as part of a seventeen-match winning streak compiled between February and May. Her third round exit was her worst performance at the tournament since 1999, when she also fell in the third round. Two ESPN experts had touted Serena Williams as the pre-tournament favourite; those same two experts also predicted that Ana Ivanovic, the 2007 runner-up whom Serena Williams would have met in the quarter-finals, would make an early exit, when, in fact, the exact opposite occurred and Ivanovic won the championship amidst a form slump which saw her suffer early defeats in Miami and Rome. Williams had said prior to the French Open that she had "enjoyed her best preparation since winning the event in 2002"; entering the tournament, she had won 23 matches and lost just two (to Jelena Janković at the Australian Open and Dinara Safina in Berlin) for the season.

On the same day as Serena Williams' defeat, older sister Venus Williams was upset by world No. 26 Flavia Pennetta, who had never previously advanced past the fourth round of the French Open, in the third round, adding to her recent history of early exits at the French Open. This marked the first time since the 2004 French Open that both the Williams sisters were defeated within 24 hours of each other; on that occasion, both were defeated in the quarter-finals by Jennifer Capriati and Anastasia Myskina, who then went on to contest a semi-final between each other.

=== Guga's goodbye ===
The 2008 French Open saw the last appearance on the ATP Tour of former world No. 1 Gustavo "Guga" Kuerten. The 31-year-old Brazilian champion, had been awarded a wild card to play his final tournament in Roland-Garros, where he won his three Grand Slam titles in 1997, 2000 and 2001. Kuerten played his first round, and final singles match on Court Philippe Chatrier against eighteenth-seeded Paul-Henri Mathieu. Kuerten conceded the victory in straight sets after a little less than two hours on the court. A ceremony followed, where Kuerten was awarded a trophy encasing the multiple layers of the French Open's clay courts. Kuerten played his last match in the men's doubles with Sébastien Grosjean. The pair was defeated after three sets by Florin Mergea & Horia Tecău on the score of 5–7, 6–3, 6–1, ending the very final appearance of Gustavo Kuerten on the tour.

=== Prix Orange, Citron & Bourgeon ===
As each year since 1981, three trophies are awarded during the tournament to the players of Roland-Garros: the Prix Orange (Orange Prize), awarded by the public to the player with the most sportsmanship, the Prix Citron (Lemon Prize), awarded by both the public and a journalists' association to the player with the strongest nature, and the Prix Bourgeon (Bud Prize), given by the journalists only to the most improved player of the year. In 2008, the Prix Orange was received, for the fourth year in a row, by Roger Federer, who came first of a tally with five choices, followed by Rafael Nadal, Gustavo Kuerten, James Blake and Carlos Moyá. The Prix Citron was obtained by Fabrice Santoro, who preceded Novak Djokovic, Maria Sharapova, Serena Williams and Juan Carlos Ferrero in the votes. The Prix Bourgeon was given by the press to Alizé Cornet, ahead of Janko Tipsarević and Ernests Gulbis. Gustavo Kuerten, already the recipient of three Prix Orange in 1998, 2002, and 2004, was presented a special ten-year prize for fair-play, in honor of his career and his successes at the French Open.

== Point distribution ==
Below are the tables with the point distribution for each discipline of the tournament.

=== Senior points ===
Event	W	F	SF	QF	Round of 16	Round of 32	Round of 64	Round of 128	Q	Q3	Q2	Q1
Men's singles	1000	700	450	250	150	75	35	5	12	8	4	0
Men's doubles	1000	700	450	250	150	75	0	—N/a	12	—N/a	0	0
Women's singles	1000	700	450	250	140	90	60	2				
Women's doubles	1000	700	450	250	140	90	0	—N/a		—N/a	0	0

== Day-by-day summaries ==
=== Day 1 ===
The Sunday start saw several seeds in the women's field go out, with Nicole Vaidišová losing to compatriot Iveta Benešová, and Virginie Razzano to Klára Zakopalová. Ana Ivanovic, Serena Williams, Alizé Cornet, Dominika Cibulková and Caroline Wozniacki all advanced to the second round.

In the men's field, all eyes were turned to a clash between Paul-Henri Mathieu and former No. 1, 1997, 2000 and 2001 French Open champion Gustavo Kuerten, which saw the Frenchman winning 6–3, 6–4, 6–2, marking the closure of Kuerten's career. Third-seeded Novak Djokovic came back from a one set deficit to Denis Gremelmayr to make it into the second round. James Blake, David Nalbandian and Nicolás Almagro proceeded to the next round in straight sets, while Andy Murray needed almost three hours to beat French wild card Jonathan Eysseric 6–2, 1–6, 4–6, 6–0, 6–2. 1998 French Open winner Carlos Moyá fell to qualifier Eduardo Schwank and Janko Tipsarević lost to Nicolás Lapentti.

- Seeded players out: Nicole Vaidišová, Virginie Razzano; Carlos Moyá, Janko Tipsarević.

(Pictures, Quotes, from Day 1)

=== Day 2 ===
In the women's event, Jelena Janković, Karin Knapp, Ágnes Szávay and Patty Schnyder all advanced, along with Venus Williams, who lost a set against Tzipora Obziler before eventually winning the match 6–3, 4–6, 6–2. Twenty-third seed Alona Bondarenko was upset by Petra Cetkovská in straight sets.

On the men's side, favorites Roger Federer, Fernando González and Fernando Verdasco all won, as well as Tomáš Berdych, who crushed his opponent Robert Smeets 6–1, 6–0, 6–0, and Tommy Robredo, who defeated 2004 French Open runner-up Guillermo Coria in four sets. Marcos Baghdatis, who had been injured since Indian Wells lost to Simone Bolelli, and 2007 French Open quarterfinalist Guillermo Cañas was also upset in straight sets and three tie-breaks by Wayne Odesnik. The shock of the day came as French No. 1 Richard Gasquet announced his withdrawal a few hours before his scheduled match to compatriot Florent Serra, due to a knee injury. Rain interrupted the play during the afternoon, causing all matches to be stopped and rescheduled to the third day.

- Seeded players out: Alona Bondarenko; Marcos Baghdatis, Guillermo Cañas, Richard Gasquet (withdrawal).

(Pictures, Quotes, from Day 2)

=== Day 3 ===
Rain disturbed the play during the whole day, causing a late start, following which Svetlana Kuznetsova and Dinara Safina qualified for the second round. After a long interruption in the afternoon, Agnieszka Radwańska, Ai Sugiyama and Amélie Mauresmo had just enough time to advance to the next round.

In the men's singles, Nikolay Davydenko and Stanislas Wawrinka won in straight sets, whereas Juan Mónaco was upset by Robin Söderling, and Mario Ančić defeated Andreas Seppi. Another rain delay eventually forced the ongoing matches to be stopped and rescheduled to the fourth day.

- Seeded players out: Juan Mónaco, Andreas Seppi.

(Pictures, Quotes, from Day 3)

=== Day 4 ===
Seventy-four matches were programmed to compensate for the rain delays, allowing Francesca Schiavone, Elena Dementieva, Flavia Pennetta, Katarina Srebotnik, Vera Zvonareva, Anna Chakvetadze, Nadia Petrova, Maria Kirilenko, Victoria Azarenka and Anabel Medina Garrigues to advance, along with world No. 1 Maria Sharapova, who was pushed for two-and-a-half hours, but came back from being led 3–4, 15–40, in the final set by compatriot Evgeniya Rodina, only No. 103 in the rankings, to win the match 6–1, 3–6, 8–6. Ninth seed Marion Bartoli, who led Casey Dellacqua when their match was stopped on day three, eventually lost, while Sybille Bammer fell to Aleksandra Wozniak, and Shahar Pe'er to Samantha Stosur. Agnieszka Radwańska, Caroline Wozniacki, Ana Ivanovic, Patty Schnyder and Serena Williams all proceeded to the third round.

In the men's event, Radek Štěpánek, Lleyton Hewitt, David Ferrer, Jarkko Nieminen, Dmitry Tursunov, Ivan Ljubičić, Mikhail Youzhny and Igor Andreev advanced, as well as defending champion Rafael Nadal, who survived a first set scare to eventually overpower qualifier Thomaz Bellucci 7–5, 6–3, 6–1. Meanwhile, 2003 French Open champion Juan Carlos Ferrero retired against Marcos Daniel due to a leg injury, and Alejandro Falla defeated Ivo Karlović 3–6, 7–6(4), 7–6(6), 5–7, 6–4, after nearly four hours. Novak Djokovic, Nicolás Almagro and Andy Murray were among the first to qualify for the third round, alongside Paul-Henri Mathieu, who rallied from two-sets-to-love to overcome Óscar Hernández in four hours and eleven minutes on the score of 2–6, 1–6, 6–4, 6–3, 6–2, and unseeded Michaël Llodra, who upset Tomáš Berdych in three hours and five sets 6–3, 4–6, 5–7, 6–3, 6–4.

- Seeded players out: Marion Bartoli, Sybille Bammer, Shahar Pe'er; Juan Carlos Ferrero (retirement), Ivo Karlović, Tomáš Berdych.

(Pictures, Quotes, from Day 4)

=== Day 5 ===
Rain again caused some delays and interruptions during the day, but it did not prevent Venus Williams, Alizé Cornet, Jelena Janković, Elena Dementieva, Karin Knapp, Flavia Pennetta, Dominika Cibulková, Katarina Srebotnik, Dinara Safina, Francesca Schiavone, Victoria Azarenka, Ágnes Szávay, Anabel Medina Garrigues and Svetlana Kuznetsova from qualifying for the next round. In the meantime, Amélie Mauresmo lost to Carla Suárez Navarro, Ai Sugiyama was defeated by Olga Govortsova, Maria Kirilenko was beaten by Zheng Jie, and Anna Chakvetadze became the highest seed to fall on day five, when she was upset by Kaia Kanepi in straight sets.

The men's field suffered several upsets as well, as James Blake lost to Ernests Gulbis, David Nalbandian was defeated by French wild card Jérémy Chardy, who climbed back from being two sets down to beat the Argentinian 3–6, 4–6, 6–2, 6–1, 6–2, in over three hours and Igor Andreev was upset by American Robby Ginepri. World No. 1 Roger Federer came back from losing the first set to dispatch his opponent Albert Montañés 6–7(5), 6–1, 6–0, 6–4, and advance to the third round along with Rafael Nadal, Mikhail Youzhny, Fernando González, Jarkko Nieminen, Dmitry Tursunov, Ivan Ljubičić, Stanislas Wawrinka, Fernando Verdasco, Nikolay Davydenko, David Ferrer, Lleyton Hewitt and Tommy Robredo.

- Seeded players out: Amélie Mauresmo, Ai Sugiyama, Anna Chakvetadze, Maria Kirilenko; James Blake, David Nalbandian, Igor Andreev.

The first matches of the doubles competition were played, with world No. 1 team Liezel Huber & Cara Black, Mariya Koryttseva & Vladimíra Uhlířová, and Peng Shuai & Sun Tiantian to be among the first to advance to the second round of the women's doubles.

On the men's side, Lukáš Dlouhý & Leander Paes, Jonas Björkman & Kevin Ullyett, Daniel Nestor & Nenad Zimonjić, Mariusz Fyrstenberg & Marcin Matkowski, Marcelo Melo & André Sá, Jonathan Erlich & Andy Ram, and No. 1 duo Bob & Mike Bryan all proceeded to the next round, while defending champion Mark Knowles, who partnered Mahesh Bhupathi this year, was defeated in straight sets by Stephen Huss & Ross Hutchins, and 2005 and 2006 champion Max Mirnyi, who teamed with Jamie Murray, lost in three sets to Rik de Voest & Robin Haase.

- Seeded players out: Mahesh Bhupathi / Mark Knowles, Max Mirnyi / Jamie Murray.

(Pictures, Quotes, from Day 5)

=== Day 6 ===
On the women's side, Nadia Petrova, Maria Sharapova and Vera Zvonareva all won their second round matches. Ana Ivanovic, victor of Caroline Wozniacki, Agnieszka Radwańska, who beat Alizé Cornet, and Patty Schnyder all advanced to the fourth round. They were joined by twenty-seventh seed Katarina Srebotnik, who produced the first big upset of the day by eliminating 2002 French Open champion, fifth seed and favorite Serena Williams 6–4, 6–4, and twenty-sixth seed Flavia Pennetta, who defeated 2002 French Open runner-up, eighth seed and other favorite Venus Williams 7–5, 6–3, marking the first time since Roland-Garros 2004 both Williams sisters lost on the same day. Serena Williams was the only remaining former champion left in the women's draw.

In the men's draw, Novak Djokovic and Paul-Henri Mathieu advanced to the fourth round, along with Rafael Nadal, who breezed by Jarkko Nieminen, Nicolás Almagro, who overcame Andy Murray in almost three hours, on the score of 6–3, 6–7(3), 6–3, 7–5, Fernando Verdasco, who defeated Mikhail Youzhny 7–6(5), 5–7, 7–5, 6–1, and French wild card Jérémy Chardy, who continued his run in the tournament by upsetting Dmitry Tursunov.

- Seeded players out: Caroline Wozniacki, Serena Williams, Alizé Cornet, Venus Williams; Jarkko Nieminen, Andy Murray, Mikhail Youzhny, Dmitry Tursunov.

In the women's doubles field, favorites Yung-jan Chan & Chia-jung Chuang, Nathalie Dechy & Elena Likhovtseva, Tatiana Poutchek & Anastasia Rodionova, Zi Yan & Zheng Jie, Dinara Safina & Ágnes Szávay, Victoria Azarenka & Shahar Pe'er, Lisa Raymond & Samantha Stosur, Květa Peschke & Rennae Stubbs and Katarina Srebotnik & Ai Sugiyama all proceeded to the second round, whereas defending champions Alicia Molik & Mara Santangelo were upset in their first match by unseeded Sara Errani & Bethanie Mattek.

Christopher Kas & Rogier Wassen, Jeff Coetzee & Wesley Moodie, and Simon Aspelin & Julian Knowle were among the teams advancing to the second round on the men's side, as Lukáš Dlouhý & Leander Paes won their second round match. Martin Damm & Pavel Vízner were defeated in straight sets by Lukas Arnold Ker & Juan Ignacio Chela, as Arnaud Clément & Michaël Llodra, who lost to Pablo Cuevas & Luis Horna, while Mariusz Fyrstenberg & Marcin Matkowski lost their second round encounter to Michal Mertiňák & Jean-Claude Scherrer.

- Seeded players out: Alicia Molik / Mara Santangelo; Julien Benneteau / Nicolas Mahut (withdrawal), Mariusz Fyrstenberg / Marcin Matkowski, Martin Damm / Pavel Vízner, Arnaud Clément / Michaël Llodra.

(Pictures, Quotes, from Day 6)

=== Day 7 ===
Victoria Azarenka, Svetlana Kuznetsova and Jelena Janković qualified for the fourth round alongside Dinara Safina, Elena Dementieva and Vera Zvonareva, at the expense of Francesca Schiavone, Nadia Petrova and Dominika Cibulková. WTA No. 1 Maria Sharapova was again pushed in the first set by Karin Knapp, before crushing her opponent in the second, to win 7–6(4), 6–0. World No. 49 Kaia Kanepi, victor of Chakvetadze on day five, pursued her run in the tournament by upsetting Anabel Medina Garrigues in three sets 6–1, 6–7(5), 7–5, and Ágnes Szávay was defeated by unseeded Petra Kvitová in three sets in the last match of the day.

In the men's field, twenty-first seed Radek Štěpánek dispatched Tommy Robredo in straight sets 6–3, 6–2, 6–1, and Roger Federer advanced past Mario Ančić in little more than an hour and a half, whereas his compatriot and ninth seed Stanislas Wawrinka, who led two-sets-to-love and 3–0 in the third, saw his adversary, Chilean Fernando González make a comeback to eventually win the match 5–7, 2–6, 6–4, 6–4, 6–4, in just over three hours. Meanwhile, Lleyton Hewitt and David Ferrer battled through five sets, breaking each other repeatedly, until the Spaniard gained the final advantage, breaking the Australian at 4–4 in the fifth set, which allowed him to win 6–2, 3–6, 3–6, 6–3, 6–4. Former Top Ten member Ivan Ljubičić produced the biggest upset of the men's field thus far, coming back from a two sets deficit to defeat world No. 4, 2007 French Open semifinalist Nikolay Davydenko 4–6, 2–6, 6–3, 6–2, 6–4, and obtain his first fourth round spot in a Grand Slam event since the 2006 French Open.

- Seeded players out: Francesca Schiavone, Nadia Petrova, Dominika Cibulková, Karin Knapp, Anabel Medina Garrigues, Ágnes Szávay; Tommy Robredo, Lleyton Hewitt, Stanislas Wawrinka, Nikolay Davydenko.

In the doubles, Alona & Kateryna Bondarenko, and Anabel Medina Garrigues & Virginia Ruano Pascual won their first round matches, while Lisa Raymond & Samantha Stosur, Mariya Koryttseva & Vladimíra Uhlířová, Yung-jan Chan & Chia-jung Chuang, Cara Black & Liezel Huber, Peng Shuai & Sun Tiantian, Victoria Azarenka & Shahar Pe'er, Zi Yan & Zheng Jie advanced to the third round. Nathalie Dechy & Elena Likhovtseva were defeated by unseeded team Sorana Cîrstea & Aravane Rezaï, second-seeded Katarina Srebotnik & Ai Sugiyama lost to Ashley Harkleroad & Galina Voskoboeva, and Iveta Benešová & Janette Husárová were beaten by Natalie Grandin & Raquel Kops-Jones.

World No. 1 doubles duo and 2003 French Open champions Bob & Mike Bryan cruised to the third round of the men's draw, along with Daniel Nestor & Nenad Zimonjić, Jonathan Erlich & Andy Ram, and Simon Aspelin & Julian Knowle. František Čermák & Jordan Kerr won one of the last first round encounters. Favorites Jeff Coetzee & Wesley Moodie were upset in straight sets by Serbian pair Janko Tipsarević & Victor Troicki, Brazilian team Marcelo Melo & André Sá lost to Rajeev Ram & Bobby Reynolds, and fifteen-seeded Christopher Kas & Rogier Wassen retired against tall opponents John Isner & Sam Querrey.

Finally, in the mixed doubles competition, No. 1 seeds Katarina Srebotnik & Nenad Zimonjić breezed by their opponents to advance to the second round along with Květa Peschke & Pavel Vízner and Cara Black & Paul Hanley. Eighth seeds Alicia Molik & Jonas Björkman were eliminated by Janette Husárová & André Sá, fourth-seeded pair Chia-jung Chuang & Jonathan Erlich lost to Olga Govortsova & Daniel Martin, and seventh seeds Lisa Raymond & Simon Aspelin to Kateryna Bondarenko & Jordan Kerr. Unseeded defending champions Nathalie Dechy & Andy Ram were upset, in the last mixed doubles match of the day, by Dominika Cibulková & Gaël Monfils.

- Seeded players out: Nathalie Dechy / Elena Likhovtseva, Katarina Srebotnik / Ai Sugiyama, Iveta Benešová / Janette Husárová; Jeff Coetzee / Wesley Moodie, Marcelo Melo / André Sá, Christopher Kas / Rogier Wassen; Alicia Molik / Jonas Björkman, Chia-jung Chuang / Jonathan Erlich, Lisa Raymond / Simon Aspelin.

(Pictures, Quotes, from Day 7)

=== Day 8 ===
WTA No. 2 and 2007 Roland-Garros runner-up Ana Ivanovic left no hopes to opponent Petra Cetkovská as the Serb double-bageled her way into the quarterfinals in less than an hour. Jelena Janković faced more difficulties as she had to battle during more than two hours against fourteenth-seeded Agnieszka Radwańska to win only 6–3, 7–6(3), and secure a quarterfinal spot, along with Patty Schnyder, who defeated Katarina Srebotnik. Meanwhile, twenty-sixth seed Flavia Pennetta lost in straight sets to nineteen-year-old Spanish qualifier Carla Suárez Navarro, in her first ever Grand Slam appearance.

In the men's draw, nineteen-year-old Latvian, unseeded Ernests Gulbis was the first player to qualify for the round of eight, by defeating Michaël Llodra in straight sets. He was followed by Novak Djokovic, who defeated Paul-Henri Mathieu 6–4, 6–3, 6–4, to reach his third consecutive quarterfinal in Roland-Garros, Nicolás Almagro, whose opponent, the French wild card Jérémy Chardy held set points in all three sets, but eventually lost on the score of 7–6(0), 7–6(7), 7–5, and ATP No. 2 and defending champion Rafael Nadal, who crushed compatriot and twenty-second seed Fernando Verdasco 6–1, 6–0, 6–2, in little less than two hours.

- Seeded players out: Flavia Pennetta, Agnieszka Radwańska, Katarina Srebotnik; Paul-Henri Mathieu, Fernando Verdasco.

In the women's doubles, Tatiana Poutchek & Anastasia Rodionova were upset in three sets by Casey Dellacqua & Francesca Schiavone in their second round match, while Anabel Medina Garrigues & Virginia Ruano Pascual, Alona & Kateryna Bondarenko, Květa Peschke & Rennae Stubbs, and Dinara Safina & Ágnes Szávay won theirs. In the third round encounters, sixth seeds Victoria Azarenka & Shahar Pe'er defeated Chinese team Peng Shuai & Sun Tiantian after three sets, Cara Black & Liezel Huber beat Mariya Koryttseva & Vladimíra Uhlířová, and unseeded pair Nuria Llagostera Vives & María José Martínez Sánchez upset Lisa Raymond & Samantha Stosur. Unseeded Ashley Harkleroad & Galina Voskoboeva were the fourth team of the day to advance to the quarterfinals.

On the men's side, Bob & Mike Bryan, and Daniel Nestor & Nenad Zimonjić qualified without problems for the quarterfinals, alongside Jonas Björkman & Kevin Ullyett, whereas ninth seeds Lukáš Dlouhý & Leander Paes were eliminated by South American duo Pablo Cuevas & Luis Horna, and Australian Open champions Jonathan Erlich & Andy Ram lost to Bruno Soares & Dušan Vemić. Unseeded Belgians Steve Darcis & Olivier Rochus also secured a quarterfinal spot. Meanwhile, thirteenth-seeded František Čermák & Jordan Kerr were knocked out of the second round by Igor Kunitsyn & Dmitry Tursunov.

In the mixed doubles, Zi Yan & Mark Knowles, and Victoria Azarenka & Bob Bryan advanced past the first round. Second-seeded Květa Peschke & Pavel Vízner proceeded to the quarterfinals, alongside unseeded teams Janette Husárová & André Sá, Kateryna Bondarenko & Jordan Kerr, and wild cards Virginie Razzano & Rogier Wassen. Despite their second round win in the morning, Zi Yan & Mark Knowles decided to withdraw from the mixed competition, allowing Liezel Huber & Jamie Murray to secure a quarterfinal spot.

- Seeded players out: Tatiana Poutchek / Anastasia Rodionova, Peng Shuai / Sun Tiantian, Mariya Koryttseva / Vladimíra Uhlířová, Lisa Raymond / Samantha Stosur; Lukáš Dlouhý / Leander Paes, František Čermák / Jordan Kerr, Jonathan Erlich / Andy Ram, Zi Yan / Mark Knowles (withdrawal).

(Pictures, Quotes, from Day 8)

=== Day 9 ===
In the women's draw, Elena Dementieva came back from the loss of the second set to defeat compatriot Vera Zvonareva 6–4, 1–6, 6–2, and reach her first quarterfinal spot in a Grand Slam since 2006. Berlin Tier I titlist, and thirteenth seed Dinara Safina saved one match point at 3–5 in the second set and overcame a 2–5 deficit in the second set tie-break, before climbing back to upset world No. 1 Maria Sharapova on the score of 6–7(6), 7–6(5), 6–2, and set up a rematch of the Berlin final against Dementieva.

After a difficult first set, Fernando González cruised to the quarterfinals beating Robby Ginepri 7–5, 6–3, 6–1, in less than two hours. World No. 1 Roger Federer struggled during almost three hours, but eventually defeated unseeded Frenchman Julien Benneteau, by breaking in the last game of every set to win the match 6–4, 7–5, 7–5. Twenty-one-year-old, ATP No. 59 Gaël Monfils was the only French player out of the five present in the round of sixteen to advance, as he upset his opponent Ivan Ljubičić on the score of 7–6(1), 4–6, 6–3, 6–2, to reach his first quarterfinal in a Grand Slam event. David Ferrer's 4–6, 6–2, 1–6, 6–3, 6–3 win over Radek Štěpánek allowed him to become the last man qualified for the singles' quarterfinals.

- Seeded players out: Vera Zvonareva, Maria Sharapova; Ivan Ljubičić, Radek Štěpánek.

Unseeded Russian pair Igor Kunitsyn & Dmitry Tursunov advanced, and were shortly followed by the unseeded team, Janko Tipsarević & Victor Troicki, who upset fifth seeds Simon Aspelin & Julian Knowle in three close sets, to complete the men's doubles' quarterfinals' line-up. Unseeded South American team Pablo Cuevas & Luis Horna produced the biggest upset of the men's draw in the first quarterfinal match, by knocking out of the tournament world No. 1 duo Bob & Mike Bryan 6–3, 5–7, 7–6(1). In the second quarterfinal of the day, Bruno Soares & Dušan Vemić upset eight seeds Jonas Björkman & Kevin Ullyett, to advance to the semis.

On the women's side, Yung-jan Chan & Chia-jung Chuang proceeded to the quarterfinals, alongside Anabel Medina Garrigues & Virginia Ruano Pascual who beat Zi Yan & Zheng Jie, unseeded Casey Dellacqua & Francesca Schiavone, who upset third seeds Květa Peschke & Rennae Stubbs, and Alona & Kateryna Bondarenko, who defeated ninth-seeded Dinara Safina & Ágnes Szávay.

Mixed doubles sixth seeds Cara Black & Paul Hanley were defeated by Zheng Jie & Mahesh Bhupathi in their second round encounter.

- Seeded players out: Zi Yan / Zheng Jie, Květa Peschke / Rennae Stubbs, Dinara Safina / Ágnes Szávay; Simon Aspelin / Julian Knowle, Bob Bryan / Mike Bryan, Jonas Björkman / Kevin Ullyett; Cara Black / Paul Hanley.

(Pictures, Quotes, from Day 9)

=== Day 10 ===
In the women's singles, WTA No. 49, twenty-two-year-old Estonian Kaia Kanepi defeated unseeded Petra Kvitová 6–3, 3–6, 6–1, to advance to the quarterfinals, her best result thus far in a Grand Slam tournament. World No. 4 Svetlana Kuznetsova matched her 2007 Roland-Garros performance by advancing to the quarterfinals, easily defeating sixteenth-seeded Victoria Azarenka (who had shown some good form in winning her first three matches for the loss of only six games) 6–2, 6–3. The first quarterfinal saw the highest seed remaining, Ana Ivanovic, beat tenth seed Patty Schnyder 6–3, 6–2, to reach her second consecutive semifinal at the French Open. She was joined in the afternoon by another 2007 French Open semifinalist, world No. 3 and Serbian No. 2 Jelena Janković, who dispatched nineteen-year-old Spanish qualifier Carla Suárez Navarro 6–3, 6–2, in little more than an hour.

After three hours of play, ATP No. 3 Novak Djokovic came out the winner of a close three-setter against nineteen-year-old unseeded Latvian Ernests Gulbis, on the score of 7–5, 7–6(3), 7–5, to reach his fifth consecutive Grand Slam semifinal. On the Philippe Chatrier central court, defending champion Rafael Nadal crushed compatriot Nicolás Almagro 6–1, 6–1, 6–1, in less than two hours, to set up a rematch of the Hamburg Masters' semifinal, and of last year's French Open semifinal, both against Djokovic.

- Seeded players out: Victoria Azarenka, Patty Schnyder; Nicolás Almagro.

No. 1 seeds Cara Black & Liezel Huber defeated all-Spanish team Nuria Llagostera Vives & María José Martínez Sánchez in straight sets, in the first quarterfinal encounter of the women's doubles. On the other side of the draw, Australian Open champions Alona & Kateryna Bondarenko also advanced, beating unseeded pair Ashley Harkleroad & Galina Voskoboeva. Unseeded Casey Dellacqua & Francesca Schiavone were the third duo to qualify for the semifinals, upsetting sixth seeds Victoria Azarenka & Shahar Pe'er, and were followed by Anabel Medina Garrigues & Virginia Ruano Pascual, who defeated fourth seeds Yung-jan Chan & Chia-jung Chuang after three close sets and more than three hours of play.

Daniel Nestor & Nenad Zimonjić, the only seeded players remaining in the men's doubles draw, advanced to the semifinals past Belgians Steve Darcis & Olivier Rochus in straight sets, while Igor Kunitsyn & Dmitry Tursunov continued their run in the tournament and completed the semifinal line-up, by defeating Janko Tipsarević & Victor Troicki.

In the first quarterfinal matches of the mixed doubles, unseeded team Zheng Jie & Mahesh Bhupathi defeated wild cards Virginie Razzano & Rogier Wassen, and second seeds Květa Peschke & Pavel Vízner overcame Janette Husárová & André Sá. Meanwhile, first-seeded Katarina Srebotnik & Nenad Zimonjić won their second round match.

- Seeded players out: Victoria Azarenka / Shahar Pe'er; Yung-jan Chan / Chia-jung Chuang.

(Pictures, Quotes, from Day 10)

=== Day 11 ===
The third quarter of the women's draw was a rematch of the 2001 French Open girls' singles final, but the unseeded twenty-two-year-old Estonian Kaia Kanepi, victor in 2001, was defeated this time by her opponent Svetlana Kuznetsova, now the WTA No. 4, in little less than an-hour and a half, on the score of 7–5, 6–2, allowing the Russian to reach her fourth Grand Slam semifinal, and her second at the French Open, after an appearance in 2006. Dinara Safina repeated her drama-filled performance of the fourth round as she saved one match point against Elena Dementieva at 3–5 in the second set, before climbing back and crushing her adversary in the final set to claim a 4–6, 7–6(5), 6–0 victory, secure her first Grand Slam semifinal spot, and set an all-Russian clash against Kuznetsova.

Fernando González made a powerful start at the beginning of his quarterfinal against Roger Federer, winning the first set 6–2 in only twenty-four minutes, before the world No. 1 took back the control of the match and easily won the following sets, to end the encounter on the score of 2–6, 6–2, 6–3, 6–4, and advance to his sixteenth consecutive Grand Slam semifinal, his fourth in Roland-Garros. In the last quarterfinal of the men's singles, ATP No. 59, twenty-one-year-old Gaël Monfils, winner of the Juniors competition at the 2004 French Open, became the first French player to go past the round of eight in Roland-Garros since 2001, as he upset fifth seed David Ferrer 6–3, 3–6, 6–3, 6–1, to set a semifinal against Federer, already the third encounter between the two players in 2008.

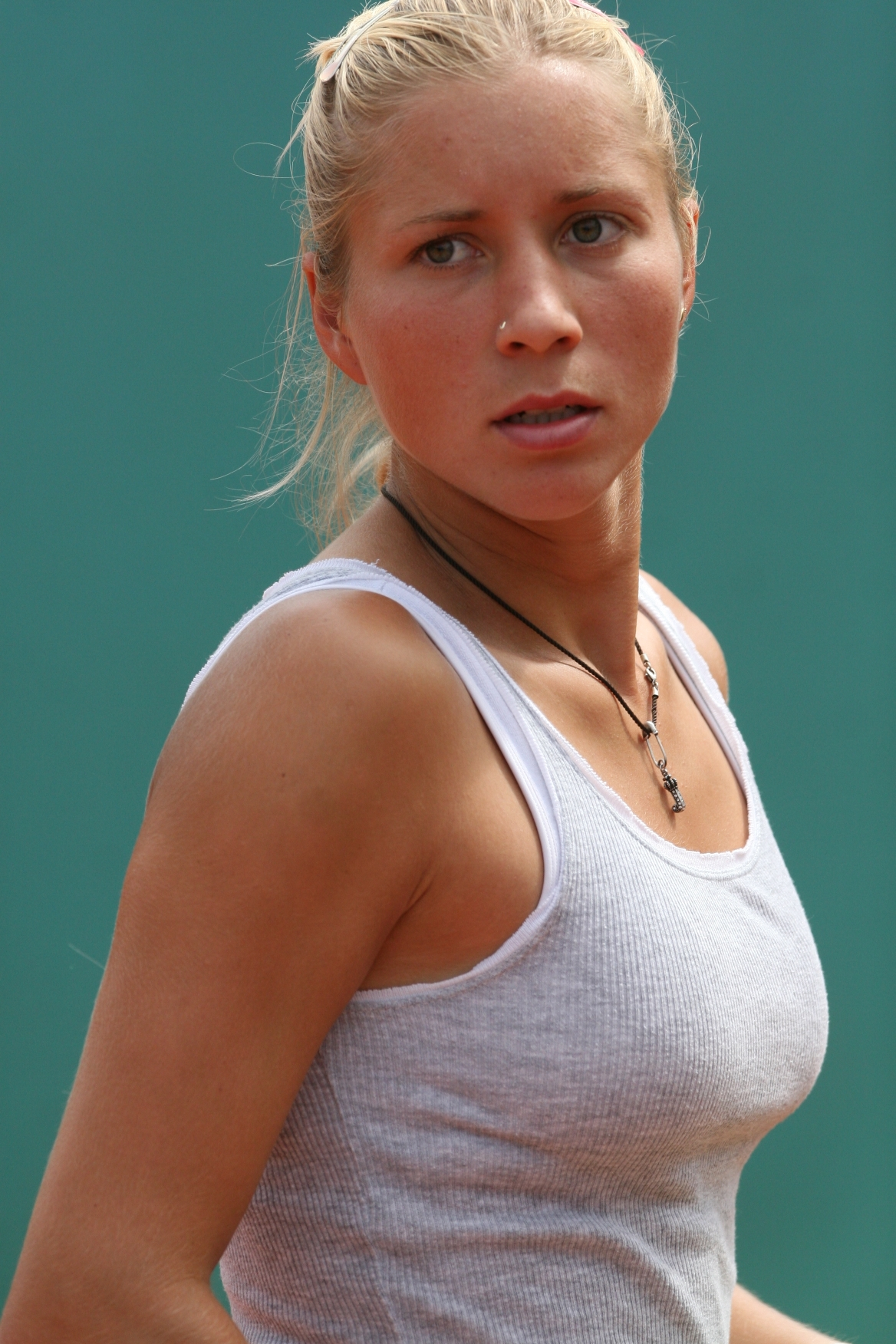
Women's doubles semifinalist Alona Bondarenko

- Seeded players out: Elena Dementieva; Fernando González, David Ferrer.

Unseeded team Casey Dellacqua & Francesca Schiavone proceeded to their first Grand Slam final by defeating Australian Open champions Alona & Kateryna Bondarenko 6–2, 6–1. In the second semifinal of the women's doubles, world No. 1 Cara Black & Liezel Huber were upset in straight sets 6–4, 7–6(2), by Anabel Medina Garrigues, who advanced to her first Grand Slam final, & Virginia Ruano Pascual, who reached her fifteenth Grand Slam final, and her seventh at the French Open.

In the mixed competition, third seeds Victoria Azarenka & Bob Bryan were the last players to qualify for the quarterfinals, by beating Vladimíra Uhlířová & Mariusz Fyrstenberg, while first seeds Katarina Srebotnik & Nenad Zimonjić defeated unseeded Kateryna Bondarenko & Jordan Kerr to be the third team to advance to the semifinals. Victoria Azarenka & Bob Bryan played a second match at the end of the day, and proceeded past unseeded Liezel Huber & Jamie Murray to complete the semifinals line-up.

- Seeded players out: Alona Bondarenko / Kateryna Bondarenko, Cara Black / Liezel Huber.

(Pictures, Quotes, from Day 11)

=== Day 12 ===
On "Ladies Days", Berlin champion, WTA No. 14 Dinara Safina advanced to her first ever Grand Slam final, dominating world No. 4 and 2006 French Open runner-up Svetlana Kuznetsova during nearly an-hour and a half, to eventually claim victory on the score of 6–3, 6–2. Kuznetsova's loss, following Sharapova's fourth round exit, meant that the second semifinal between Australian Open finalist and Indian Wells Tier I titlist Ana Ivanovic and Rome winner Jelena Janković was bound to decide who would be the next world No. 1. Janković took the first advantage in the match, leading 4–2 when Ivanovic made a comeback and snatched the first set, extending her dominance to the midst of the second, when she saw her adversary win seven games in a row, even the score to one-set-all, and take the early advantage in the final set. Ivanovic broke back once to 3–3 but lost her serve, before breaking again to even the score at 4–4, win her serve, and take Janković's to finally win, after over two hours of play, on the score of 6–4, 3–6, 6–4, advance to her third Grand Slam final, her second consecutive in Roland-Garros, and be assured to become the new world No. 1 on June 9, 2008.

- Seeded players out: Svetlana Kuznetsova, Jelena Janković.

The first semifinal of the men's doubles, that opposed unseeded Uruguayan Pablo Cuevas & Peruvian Luis Horna to alternates Brazilian Bruno Soares & Serbian Dušan Vemić, lasted almost three hours and extended to a third set tie-break, until Cuevas & Horna took a final advantage, to score a 6–4, 6–7(6), 7–6(6) victory, and advance to their first Grand Slam final. After losing the first set to unseeded Russian pair Igor Kunitsyn & Dmitry Tursunov, second seeded Daniel Nestor, the defending champion, & new partner Nenad Zimonjić battled to take back the advantage, ultimately winning the match, and reach their first Grand Slam final together on the score of 4–6, 6–4, 6–4.

In the mixed category, Zheng Jie & Mahesh Bhupathi withdrew, consequently offering a final spot to their opponents Katarina Srebotnik & Nenad Zimonjić, who reached their third consecutive French Open final together, having previously won in 2006, and lost in 2007. The second semifinal was played in the afternoon, and saw Victoria Azarenka & Bob Bryan defeat Czech team Květa Peschke & Pavel Vízner 4–6, 6–3, 10–8, to advance to their first Grand Slam mixed doubles final together.

- Seeded players out: Květa Peschke / Pavel Vízner.

(Pictures, Quotes, from Day 12)

=== Day 13 ===
The first men's singles semifinal, which opposed world No. 2 and defending champion Rafael Nadal to world No. 3 and Australian Open champion Novak Djokovic, saw the Spaniard dominating his opponent throughout two-and-a-half sets, until Djokovic made a comeback, breaking Nadal several times to extend the match to a third set tie-break. Nadal won six consecutive points in the tie-break, to finally win the encounter at his fourth match point on the score of 6–4, 6–2, 7–6(3), to advance to his fourth consecutive French Open final. World No. 1 Roger Federer made a strong start in the second semifinal that opposed him to ATP No. 59 Gaël Monfils, winning the first set in thirty minutes and breaking early in the second, before Monfils fought back, and broke the Swiss to snatch the second set. Federer cruised again in the third, before the match evened in the fourth, each player saving break points, until Federer took the Frenchman's serve at 6–5, to win on the final score of 6–2, 5–7, 6–3, 7–5, after three hours of play, and advance to his sixteenth Grand Slam final, his third consecutive one in Roland-Garros, a third time against Nadal.

- Seeded player out: Novak Djokovic.

Tenth-seeded, all Spanish-team Anabel Medina Garrigues & Virginia Ruano Pascual competed with unseeded Australian Casey Dellacqua & Italian Francesca Schiavone for the women's doubles title. Dellacqua & Schiavone commanded the game in the first set, winning 6–2 in nearly forty minutes, before their adversaries broke to 6–5 in the second, and won their serve to come back to one-set-all. Garrigues & Ruano Pascual broke in the first game of the third set, kept their advantage up to 4–3, when Dellacqua & Schiavone broke back to 4–all. Garrigues & Ruano Pascual managed to immediately take their opponents' serve again and keep theirs to win the match 2–6, 7–5, 6–4, after two-hours-and-a-half. In becoming the 2008 French Open women's doubles champions, Anabel Medina Garrigues won her first ever Grand Slam doubles title, & Virginia Ruano Pascual, a fifteen-time Grand Slam doubles finalist, holder of eight titles, won her fifth victory at the French Open.

The final of the mixed doubles took place between first seeds Slovene Katarina Srebotnik & Serbian Nenad Zimonjić, and third seeds Victoria Azarenka, from Belarus & Bob Bryan, from the USA. After easily winning the first set 6–2 in only twenty-two minutes, Azarenka & Bryan saw their adversaries even the competition, as Srebotnik & Zimonjic held their serve to a second set tie-break, in which they even took the early advantage, leading 4–3. Azarenka & Bryan were able to break back, and win four points in a row to eventually claim victory on the score of 6–2, 7–6(5), in little more than an hour. Victoria Azarenka, already the 2007 US Open mixed doubles champion, and the 2007 Australian Open mixed doubles runner-up, & Bob Bryan, finalist of the mixed doubles competition in Wimbledon 2006, and winner at the US Open in 2003, 2004, and 2006, won their first Grand Slam title together, becoming the new Roland-Garros mixed doubles champions.

- Seeded players out: Katarina Srebotnik / Nenad Zimonjić.

(Pictures from Day 13)

=== Day 14 ===
The women's singles final was played by then WTA No. 2 Ana Ivanovic, the 2007 French Open and 2008 Australian Open runner-up, assured to become world No. 1 on June 9, 2008, regardless of the result, and thirteenth seed Dinara Safina, the Berlin Tier I titlist, in her first ever Grand Slam final appearance. Ivanovic made the strongest start in the match, taking Safina's serve in the opening game, and once more at 3–1, to open a 4–1 lead in the first set. Safina started to take back the advantage, as she broke the Serbian twice and won her own serve to come back at 4–4. Ivanovic immediately recovered her break, and eventually kept her serve at 5–4, to close the first set on the score of 6–4. Ivanovic broke the Russian for a 2–1 lead in the second set, and continued to dominate Safina up to the seventh game, where she held double-break balls at 4–2. Af the end of this long game, in which both players repeatedly took and lost the advantage, Safina ultimately kept her serve, but the Russian was unable to attack Ivanovic in the following game, and found herself serving to stay in the match at 3–5. The Serbian pressured Safina, and eventually broke her a final time, to win the match on the score of 6–4, 6–3, after ninety-eight minutes of play. Both players received their trophies from the hands of former world No. 1 and 2003, 2005, 2006, and 2007 French Open champion Justine Henin in the awards ceremony that followed, which crowned Ivanovic, a first-time Grand Slam winner, as the new Roland-Garros women's singles champion. Ivanovic became the first Serbian winner of a Grand Slam women's singles title, and the second Serbian overall after Novak Djokovic's win at the 2008 Australian Open. It would be the last time that Ana Ivanovic would feature past the Round of 16 at any Grand Slam tournament until the 2012 US Open.

The men's doubles final featured second seeds Canadian Daniel Nestor, a nine-time Grand Slam doubles finalist, winner of the 2007 French Open with Mark Knowles, & Serbian Nenad Zimonjić, a two-time doubles final runner-up in Wimbledon, and unseeded South American duo, composed of Uruguayan Pablo Cuevas, No. 50 in the doubles rankings, & Peruvian Luis Horna, No. 43 in the doubles rankings, on their first ever Grand Slam final appearance separately and together. The unseeded South Americans completely dominated the seasoned champions during the final, breaking them twice in each set, never losing their serve themselves, to crush Nestor & Zimonjic in only fifty-six minutes, on the score of 6–2, 6–3, and win their first doubles title together. Pablo Cuevas & Luis Horna knocked out four seeded teams, Arnaud Clément & Michaël Llodra, Lukáš Dlouhý & Leander Paes, world No. 1 pair Bob & Mike Bryan, and ultimately Daniel Nestor & Nenad Zimonjić on their way to becoming the first South American team to win a Men's Doubles Grand Slam title, and the 2008 French Open men's doubles champions.

(Pictures from Day 14)

=== Day 15 ===
The men's singles final took place at 15:00 (UTC+2) on the Philippe Chatrier Central Court, and featured, for the third straight year after 2006 and 2007, the world No. 1 and holder of twelve Grand Slam titles, Roger Federer, and ATP No. 2 Rafael Nadal, the winner in Roland-Garros since 2005. Federer decided to serve after being given the choice, but the Spaniard immediately attacked the Swiss' serve, and broke him, winning his own service game to quickly open a 2–0 lead. Though Federer won his following serve, he was not able in the rest of the set to convert the few break points he had on Nadal's serve, or win his own service games, allowing the Spaniard to close the first set in thirty-two minutes, on the score of 6–1. Despite being broken in the beginning of the second set, Federer started to fight back, as he finally took Nadal's serve, came back to 2–2, and held to 3–3. After a long game on Federer's serve, Nadal finally broke once more, and rapidly finished the set on the score of 6–3, after forty-nine minutes. There was no competition in what would become the final set as Nadal left no chances to Federer, and the Swiss was not able to find a second breath to start a comeback, not winning any game in the twenty-seven minutes set, and suffering a bagel for the first time in a Grand Slam since a 1999 Roland-Garros first round loss to Pat Rafter. Particularly relevant to the outcome of their meeting were Federer's thirty-five unforced errors to Nadal's seven during the brief match which never allowed him to gain a foothold. Rafael Nadal claimed his fourth consecutive French Open crown, on the final score of 6–1, 6–3, 6–0, and in becoming the 2008 French Open champion equalled Björn Borg's record of four straight Roland-Garros titles, and extended his win–loss record at the tournament to 28–0.

(Pictures from Day 15)

== Singles seeds ==
The following are the seeded players and notable players who withdrew from the event. Seedings are based on ATP and WTA rankings as of 19 May 2008. Rankings and points are as of before 26 May 2008.

=== Men's singles ===
Seed	Rank	Player	Points before	Points defending	Points won	Points after	Status
1	1	(Switzerland) Roger Federer	6,675	700	700	6,675	Runner-up, lost to (Spain) Rafael Nadal [2]
2	2	(Spain) Rafael Nadal	5,585	1,000	1,000	5,585	Champion, defeated (Switzerland) Roger Federer [1]
3	3	(Serbia) Novak Djokovic	5,225	450	450	5,225	Semifinals lost to (Spain) Rafael Nadal [2]
4	4	(Russia) Nikolay Davydenko	3,425	450	75	3,050	Third round lost to (Croatia) Ivan Ljubičić [28]
5	5	(Spain) David Ferrer	2,730	75	250	2,905	Quarterfinals lost to (France) Gaël Monfils
6	7	(Argentina) David Nalbandian	2,115	150	35	2,000	Second round lost to (France) Jérémy Chardy [WC]
7	8	(United States) James Blake	1,985	5	35	2,015	Second round lost to (Latvia) Ernests Gulbis
~~8~~	~~9~~	~~(France) Richard Gasquet~~	1,630	35	0	1,595	Withdrew due to knee injury
9	10	(Switzerland) Stan Wawrinka	1,575	35	75	1,615	Third round lost to (Chile) Fernando González [24]
10	12	(United Kingdom) Andy Murray	1,480	0	75	1,555	Third round lost to (Spain) Nicolás Almagro [19]
11	13	(Czech Republic) Tomáš Berdych	1,460	5	35	1,490	Second round lost to (France) Michaël Llodra
12	14	(Spain) Tommy Robredo	1,430	250	75	1,255	Third round lost to (Czech Republic) Radek Štěpánek [21]
13	16	(Argentina) Juan Mónaco	1,375	150	5	1,230	First round lost to (Sweden) Robin Söderling
~~14~~	~~11~~	~~(France) Jo-Wilfried Tsonga~~	1,495	(55)^{†}	0	1,440	Withdrew due to knee injury
15	15	(Russia) Mikhail Youzhny	1,410	150	75	1,335	Third round lost to (Spain) Fernando Verdasco [22]
16	17	(Spain) Carlos Moyá	1,340	250	5	1,095	First round lost to (Argentina) Eduardo Schwank [Q]
17	18	(Cyprus) Marcos Baghdatis	1,335	150	5	1,190	First round lost to (Italy) Simone Bolelli
18	19	(France) Paul-Henri Mathieu	1,275	75	150	1,425	Fourth round lost to (Serbia) Novak Djokovic [3]
19	20	(Spain) Nicolás Almagro	1,270	35	250	1,485	Quarterfinals lost to (Spain) Rafael Nadal [2]
20	21	(Croatia) Ivo Karlović	1,250	35	5	1,220	First round lost to (Colombia) Alejandro Falla
21	22	(Czech Republic) Radek Štěpánek	1,245	35	150	1,360	Fourth round lost to (Spain) David Ferrer [5]
22	23	(Spain) Fernando Verdasco	1,240	150	150	1,240	Fourth round lost to (Spain) Rafael Nadal [2]
23	24	(Spain) Juan Carlos Ferrero	1,205	75	5	1,135	First round retired against (Brazil) Marcos Daniel
24	25	(Chile) Fernando González	1,160	5	250	1,415	Quarterfinals lost to (Switzerland) Roger Federer [1]
25	28	(Australia) Lleyton Hewitt	1,085	150	75	1,010	Third round lost to (Spain) David Ferrer [5]
26	26	(Finland) Jarkko Nieminen	1,130	75	75	1,130	Third round lost to (Spain) Rafael Nadal [2]
27	27	(Russia) Igor Andreev	1,125	250	35	910	Second round lost to (United States) Robby Ginepri
28	30	(Croatia) Ivan Ljubičić	1,005	75	150	1,080	Fourth round lost to (France) Gaël Monfils
29	31	(Argentina) Guillermo Cañas	1,000	250	5	755	First round lost to (United States) Wayne Odesnik [WC]
30	33	(Russia) Dmitry Tursunov	980	35	75	1,020	Third round lost to (France) Jérémy Chardy [WC]
31	32	(Italy) Andreas Seppi	998	5	5	998	First round lost to (Croatia) Mario Ančić
32	34	(Serbia) Janko Tipsarević	958	75	5	928	First round lost to (Ecuador) Nicolás Lapentti

† The player did not qualify for the tournament in 2007. Accordingly, points for his 18th best result are deducted instead.

The following player would have been seeded, but he withdrew from the event.

Rank	Player	Points before	Points defending	Points after	Withdrawal reason
6	(United States) Andy Roddick	2,410	5	2,405	Shoulder injury

=== Women's singles ===
Seed	Rank	Player	Points before	Points defending	Points won	Points after	Status
1	1	(Russia) Maria Sharapova	4,116	450	140	3,806	Fourth round lost to (Russia) Dinara Safina [13]
2	2	(Serbia) Ana Ivanovic	3,922	700	1,000	4,222	Champion, defeated (Russia) Dinara Safina [13]
3	3	(Serbia) Jelena Janković	3,755	450	450	3,755	Semifinals lost to (Serbia) Ana Ivanovic [2]
4	4	(Russia) Svetlana Kuznetsova	3,365	250	450	3,565	Semifinals lost to (Russia) Dinara Safina [13]
5	5	(United States) Serena Williams	2,836	250	90	2,676	Third round lost to (Slovenia) Katarina Srebotnik [27]
6	6	(Russia) Anna Chakvetadze	2,731	250	60	2,541	Second round lost to (Spain) Nuria Llagostera Vives
7	8	(Russia) Elena Dementieva	2,590	90	250	2,750	Quarterfinals lost to (Russia) Dinara Safina [13]
8	7	(United States) Venus Williams	2,606	90	90	2,606	Third round lost to (Italy) Flavia Pennetta [26]
9	9	(France) Marion Bartoli	2,173	140	2	2,035	First round lost to (Australia) Casey Dellacqua
10	11	(Switzerland) Patty Schnyder	1,830	140	250	1,940	Quarterfinals lost to (Serbia) Ana Ivanovic [2]
11	12	(Russia) Vera Zvonareva	1,772	0	140	1,912	Fourth round lost to (Russia) Elena Dementieva [7]
12	13	(Hungary) Ágnes Szávay	1,682	91	90	1,681	Third round lost to (Czech Republic) Petra Kvitová
13	14	(Russia) Dinara Safina	1,662	140	700	2,222	Runner-up, lost to (Serbia) Ana Ivanovic [2]
14	15	(Poland) Agnieszka Radwańska	1,638	2	140	1,780	Fourth round lost to (Serbia) Jelena Janković [3]
15	16	(Czech Republic) Nicole Vaidišová	1,435	250	2	1,187	First round lost to (Czech Republic) Iveta Benešová [Q]
16	17	(Belarus) Victoria Azarenka	1,248	2	140	1,390	Fourth round lost to (Russia) Svetlana Kuznetsova [4]
17	18	(Israel) Shahar Pe'er	1,215	140	2	1,077	First round lost to (Australia) Samantha Stosur [WC]
18	19	(Italy) Francesca Schiavone	1,201	90	90	1,201	Third round lost to (Belarus) Victoria Azarenka [16]
19	20	(France) Alizé Cornet	1,160	2	90	1,248	Third round lost to (Poland) Agnieszka Radwańska [14]
20	22	(Austria) Sybille Bammer	1,150	140	2	1,012	First round lost to (Canada) Aleksandra Wozniak
21	23	(Russia) Maria Kirilenko	1,123	60	60	1,123	Second round lost to (China) Zheng Jie [Q]
22	29	(France) Amélie Mauresmo	1,017	90	60	987	Second round lost to (Spain) Carla Suárez Navarro [Q]
23	27	(Ukraine) Alona Bondarenko	1,046	60	2	988	First round lost to (Czech Republic) Petra Cetkovská
24	28	(France) Virginie Razzano	1,030	2	2	1,030	First round lost to (Czech Republic) Klára Zakopalová
25	25	(Russia) Nadia Petrova	1,058	2	90	1,156	Third round lost to (Russia) Svetlana Kuznetsova [4]
26	30	(Italy) Flavia Pennetta	999	2	140	1,137	Fourth round lost to (Spain) Carla Suárez Navarro [Q]
27	24	(Slovenia) Katarina Srebotnik	1,060	90	140	1,110	Fourth round lost to (Switzerland) Patty Schnyder [10]
28	31	(Slovakia) Dominika Cibulková	933	121	90	902	Fourth round lost to (Serbia) Jelena Janković [3]
29	33	(Spain) Anabel Medina Garrigues	848	140	90	798	Third round lost to (Estonia) Kaia Kanepi
30	34	(Denmark) Caroline Wozniacki	775	2	90	863	Third round lost to (Serbia) Ana Ivanovic [2]
31	35	(Japan) Ai Sugiyama	752	90	60	722	Second round lost to (Belarus) Olga Govortsova
32	38	(Italy) Karin Knapp	695	90	90	695	Third round lost to (Russia) Maria Sharapova [1]

The following players would have been seeded, but they withdrew or not entered from the event.

Rank	Player	Points before	Points defending	Points after	Withdrawal reason
10	(Slovakia) Daniela Hantuchová	2,122	90	2,032	Heel injury
21	(France) Tatiana Golovin	1,160	0	1,160	Back injury
26	(United States) Lindsay Davenport	1,055	0	1,055	Scheduling
32	(India) Sania Mirza	917	60	857	Wrist injury

== Seniors ==
=== Men's singles ===
(Spain) Rafael Nadal defeated (Switzerland) Roger Federer, 6–1, 6–3, 6–0

- It was Nadal's 4th title of the year, and his 27th overall. It was his 1st Grand Slam title of the year, his 4th overall, and his 4th win at the event, after 2005, 2006, and 2007.

=== Women's singles ===
(Serbia) Ana Ivanovic defeated (Russia) Dinara Safina, 6–4, 6–3

- It was Ivanovic's 2nd title of the year, and her 7th overall. It was her 1st and only career Grand Slam title.

=== Men's doubles ===
(Uruguay) Pablo Cuevas / (Peru) Luis Horna defeated (Canada) Daniel Nestor / (Serbia) Nenad Zimonjić, 6–2, 6–3

=== Women's doubles ===
(Spain) Anabel Medina Garrigues / (Spain) Virginia Ruano Pascual defeated (Australia) Casey Dellacqua / (Italy) Francesca Schiavone, 2–6, 7–5, 6–4

- It was Medina's 1st career Grand Slam title.
- It was Ruano's 9th career Grand Slam title, and her 5th at the French Open.

=== Mixed doubles ===
(Belarus) Victoria Azarenka / (United States) Bob Bryan defeated (Slovenia) Katarina Srebotnik / (Serbia) Nenad Zimonjić, 6–2, 7–6^{(7–4)}

== Juniors ==
=== Boys' singles ===
(Chinese Taipei) Yang Tsung-hua defeated (Poland) Jerzy Janowicz, 6–3, 7–6^{(7–5)}

=== Girls' singles ===
(Romania) Simona Halep (Note: Halep reached the final in 2014 and 2017, losing to Maria Sharapova and Jeļena Ostapenko, respectively, before going on to win in 2018 by defeating Sloane Stephens in the final.) defeated (Romania) Elena Bogdan, 6–4, 6–7^{(3–7)}, 6–2

=== Boys' doubles ===
(Finland) Henri Kontinen / (Indonesia) Christopher Rungkat defeated (Germany) Jaan-Frederik Brunken / (Australia) Matt Reid, 6–0, 6–3

=== Girls' doubles ===
(Slovenia) Polona Hercog / (Australia) Jessica Moore defeated (Netherlands) Lesley Kerkhove / (Netherlands) Arantxa Rus, 5–7, 6–1, 10–7

== Other events ==
=== Legends under 45 doubles ===
(Croatia) Goran Ivanišević / (Germany) Michael Stich defeated (Netherlands) Richard Krajicek / (Spain) Emilio Sánchez, 6–1, 7–6(5)

=== Legends over 45 doubles ===
(Sweden) Anders Järryd / (United States) John McEnroe defeated (Iran) Mansour Bahrami / (France) Henri Leconte, 6–4, 7–6(2)

=== Wheelchair men's singles ===
(Japan) Shingo Kunieda defeated (Netherlands) Robin Ammerlaan, 6–0, 7–6(5)

=== Wheelchair women's singles ===
(Netherlands) Esther Vergeer defeated (Netherlands) Korie Homan, 6–2, 6–2

=== Wheelchair men's doubles ===
(Japan) Shingo Kunieda / (Netherlands) Maikel Scheffers defeated (Netherlands) Robin Ammerlaan / (Netherlands) Ronald Vink, 6–2, 7–5

=== Wheelchair women's doubles ===
(Netherlands) Jiske Griffioen / (Netherlands) Esther Vergeer defeated (Netherlands) Korie Homan / (Netherlands) Sharon Walraven, 6–4, 6–4

== Wildcard entries ==
Below are the lists of the wildcard awardees entering in the main draws.

=== Men's singles wildcard entries ===
1. (France) Jérémy Chardy
2. (France) Jonathan Eysseric
3. (Brazil) Gustavo Kuerten
4. (France) Adrian Mannarino
5. (United States) Wayne Odesnik
6. (France) Olivier Patience
7. (France) Éric Prodon
8. (Australia) Robert Smeets

=== Women's singles wildcard entries ===
1. (France) Séverine Brémond
2. (United States) Madison Brengle
3. (France) Youlia Fedossova
4. (France) Stéphanie Foretz
5. (France) Violette Huck
6. (France) Mathilde Johansson
7. (France) Olivia Sanchez
8. (Australia) Samantha Stosur

=== Men's doubles wildcard entries ===
1. (France) Thierry Ascione / (France) Florent Serra
2. (France) Jérémy Chardy / (France) David Guez
3. (France) Nicolas Devilder / (France) Olivier Patience
4. (France) Jonathan Eysseric / (France) Adrian Mannarino
5. (France) Sébastien Grosjean / (Brazil) Gustavo Kuerten
6. (France) Gaël Monfils / (France) Josselin Ouanna
7. (France) Éric Prodon / (France) Laurent Recouderc

=== Women's doubles wildcard entries ===
1. (France) Séverine Brémond / (France) Mathilde Johansson
2. (France) Stéphanie Cohen-Aloro / (France) Camille Pin
3. (France) Julie Coin / (France) Violette Huck
4. (France) Youlia Fedossova / (France) Virginie Pichet
5. (France) Amandine Hesse / (France) Kristina Mladenovic
6. (France) Sophie Lefèvre / (France) Aurélie Védy
7. (France) Olivia Sanchez / (France) Laura Thorpe

=== Mixed doubles wildcard entries ===
1. (Slovakia) Dominika Cibulková / (France) Gaël Monfils
2. (France) Stéphanie Foretz / (France) Édouard Roger-Vasselin
3. (France) Pauline Parmentier / (France) Thierry Ascione
4. (France) Camille Pin / (France) Gilles Simon
5. (France) Virginie Razzano / (Netherlands) Rogier Wassen
6. ~~(France) Aurélie Védy~~ / ~~(France) Michaël Llodra~~

== Qualifier entries ==
=== Men's qualifiers entries ===
1. (Argentina) Eduardo Schwank
2. (Brazil) Thomaz Bellucci
3. (Argentina) Diego Junqueira
4. (Monaco) Jean-René Lisnard
5. (Germany) Simon Greul
6. (United States) Scoville Jenkins
7. (Croatia) Roko Karanušić
8. (Spain) Miguel Ángel López Jaén
9. (Netherlands) Jesse Huta Galung
10. (Germany) Daniel Brands
11. (Romania) Victor Crivoi
12. (France) Nicolas Devilder
13. (Spain) David Marrero
14. (Argentina) Máximo González
15. (Chile) Paul Capdeville
16. (Portugal) Frederico Gil

The following players received entry into a lucky loser spot:

1. (Spain) Pablo Andújar
2. (Russia) Evgeny Korolev
3. (Argentina) Sebastián Decoud
4. (Colombia) Santiago Giraldo
5. (France) Josselin Ouanna
6. (Spain) Marc López
7. (Peru) Luis Horna

=== Women's qualifiers entries ===
1. (Czech Republic) Iveta Benešová
2. (Croatia) Jelena Pandžić
3. (Russia) Anastasia Pavlyuchenkova
4. (Belgium) Yanina Wickmayer
5. (Tunisia) Selima Sfar
6. (Belarus) Anastasiya Yakimova
7. (United States) Bethanie Mattek
8. (Slovakia) Magdaléna Rybáriková
9. (Slovakia) Jarmila Gajdošová
10. (China) Zheng Jie
11. (Spain) Carla Suárez Navarro
12. (Spain) María José Martínez Sánchez

The following players received entry into a lucky loser spot:

1. (Romania) Monica Niculescu

== Withdrawals ==
Men's singles

- (Italy) Fabio Fognini → replaced by (France) Josselin Ouanna
- (France) Richard Gasquet → replaced by (Colombia) Santiago Giraldo
- (France) Sébastien Grosjean → replaced by (Argentina) Sebastián Decoud
- (Germany) Tommy Haas → replaced by (Spain) Pablo Andújar
- (Germany) Nicolas Kiefer → replaced by (Spain) Marc López
- (Austria) Stefan Koubek → replaced by (Germany) Denis Gremelmayr
- (Germany) Florian Mayer → replaced by (Russia) Evgeny Korolev
- (Romania) Andrei Pavel → replaced by (Serbia) Viktor Troicki
- (United States) Andy Roddick → replaced by (Argentina) Guillermo Coria
- (France) Jo-Wilfried Tsonga → replaced by (Peru) Luis Horna

Women's singles

- (Greece) Eleni Daniilidou → replaced by (Russia) Ekaterina Bychkova
- (United States) Lindsay Davenport → replaced by (Chinese Taipei) Hsieh Su-wei
- (France) Tatiana Golovin → replaced by (Ukraine) Yuliana Fedak
- (Slovakia) Daniela Hantuchová → replaced by (Romania) Monica Niculescu
- (Belgium) Justine Henin → replaced by (Italy) Maria Elena Camerin
- (China) Li Na → replaced by (Croatia) Sanda Mamić
- (Germany) Tatjana Malek → replaced by (Germany) Sandra Klösel
- (India) Sania Mirza → replaced by (United States) Vania King
- (United States) Meghann Shaughnessy → replaced by (Canada) Aleksandra Wozniak
- (United States) Meilen Tu → replaced by (Colombia) Catalina Castaño

== Notes ==
Preceded by 2008 Australian Open	Grand Slams	Succeeded by 2008 Wimbledon Championships
