= Gérard Brosselin =

French tennis player (1870–1905)

Gérard Brosselin (5 October 1870, Paris, France – 12 January 1905, Paris, France) was a tennis player. He competed for France.

Brosselin was twice a runner-up in the singles event of the Amateur French Championships, losing in 1894 and 1896 to André Vacherot.

== Grand Slam finals ==
=== Singles: 3 (0-3) ===
Outcome	Year	Championship	Surface	Opponent in the final	Score in the final
Runner-up	1894	French Championships	Clay (red)	(France) André Vacherot	1–6, 6–3, 6–3
Runner-up	1896	French Championships	Clay (red)	(France) André Vacherot	6–1, 7–5
