= Paul Aymé =

French tennis player (1869–1962)

- Country (sports): France
- Born: 29 July 1869; Marseille, France
- Died: 25 July 1962 (aged 92); Madrid, Spain

Paul Aymé (29 July 1869 in Marseille – 25 July 1962 in Madrid) was a French tennis player

== Tennis career ==
Paul Aymé is best remembered for winning the French Championship four straight years; 1897, 1898, 1899, and 1900.
