= André Vacherot =

French tennis player

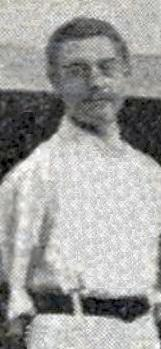
André Vacherot

André Pierre Aurèle Gaston Vacherot (5 June 1877 in Paris, France – 22 February 1924 in Rouen, France) was a French male tennis player. He is best remembered for having won the men's singles event of the French Championships on four occasions: 1894, 1895, 1896, and 1901.

His younger brother Marcel Vacherot was also a tennis player. Together they won the men's doubles in 1901. For André this was his second doubles victory, as he had already won this title back in 1895 together with the German Christian Winzer.

The two brothers André and Marcel Vacherot were grandsons of the French philosopher Étienne Vacherot.
