= List of French Open champions =

The following is a list of French Open champions in tennis:

== Champions ==
† Not considered to be a Grand Slam event. A French club members only-tournament.

†† Disputed champions: Not considered to be a Grand Slam event. Not sanctioned or recognised by the FFT. See Tournoi de France (Note: Due to World War II, the tournaments held from 1941 to 1945 are not officially recognized by the Fédération Française de Tennis. Consequently, despite being listed by a few sources, the champions from those years are not included in the official statistics. They are listed here as a historical note.)

=== Senior ===
Year	Singles		Doubles		
Year	Men	Women	Men	Women	Mixed
1891	(United Kingdom) H. Briggs †	No competition	(France) B. Desjoyau (France) T. Legrand †	No competition	No competition
1892	(France) Jean Schopfer †	No competition	(France) J. Havet (France) D. Albertini †	No competition	No competition
1893	(France) Laurent Riboulet †	No competition	(France) Jean Schopfer (United Kingdom) J. Goldsmith †	No competition	No competition
1894	(France) André Vacherot (x3) †	No competition	(France) Gérard Brosselin (France) J. Lesage †	No competition	No competition
1895	(France) André Vacherot (x3) †	No competition	(France) André Vacherot (Germany) Christian Winzer †	No competition	No competition
1896	(France) André Vacherot (x3) †	No competition	(United Kingdom) F. Warden (United Kingdom) Wynes †	No competition	No competition
1897	(France) Paul Aymé (x4) †	(France) Adine Masson (x3) †	(France) Paul Aymé (France) Paul Lebreton †	No competition	No competition
1898	(France) Paul Aymé (x4) †	(France) Adine Masson (x3) †	(France) Marcel Vacherot (Greece) Xenophon Kasdaglis †	No competition	No competition
1899	(France) Paul Aymé (x4) †	(France) Adine Masson (x3) †	(France) Paul Aymé (France) Paul Lebreton † (x2)	No competition	No competition
1900	(France) Paul Aymé (x4) †	(France) Yvonne Prévost †	(France) Paul Aymé (France) Paul Lebreton † (x2)	No competition	No competition
1901	(France) André Vacherot †	(France) Suzanne Girod †	(France) André Vacherot (France) Marcel Vacherot †	No competition	No competition
1902	(France) Michel Vacherot †	(France) Adine Masson (x2) †	(France) Max Decugis (France) J. Worth † (x2)	No competition	(France) Helene Prevost (France) Réginald Forbes (x2) †
1903	(France) Max Decugis (x2) †	(France) Adine Masson (x2) †	(France) Max Decugis (France) J. Worth † (x2)	No competition	(France) Helene Prevost (France) Réginald Forbes (x2) †
1904	(France) Max Decugis (x2) †	(France) Kate Gillou (x3) †	(France) Max Décugis (France) Maurice Germot †	No competition	(France) Kate Gillou (France) Max Decugis †
1905	(France) Maurice Germot (x2) †	(France) Kate Gillou (x3) †	(France) Max Décugis (France) J. Worth †	No competition	(France) Yvonne de Pfeffel (France) Max Decugis (x2) †
1906	(France) Maurice Germot (x2) †	(France) Kate Gillou (x3) †	(France) Max Décugis (France) Maurice Germot † (x4)	No competition	(France) Yvonne de Pfeffel (France) Max Decugis (x2) †
1907	(France) Max Decugis (x3) †	(France) Comtesse de Kermel †	(France) Max Décugis (France) Maurice Germot † (x4)	(France) Adine Masson (France) Yvonne de Pfeffel †	(France) A. Pean (France) Robert Wallet †
1908	(France) Max Decugis (x3) †	(France) Kate Gillou-Fenwick †	(France) Max Décugis (France) Maurice Germot † (x4)	(France) Kate Fenwick (France) Cecile Matthey †	(France) Kate Gillou (France) Max Decugis †
1909	(France) Max Decugis (x3) †	(France) Jeanne Matthey (x4) †	(France) Max Décugis (France) Maurice Germot † (x4)	(France) Jeanne Matthey (France) Daisy Speranza (x4) †	(France) Jeanne Matthey (France) Max Decugis †
1910	(France) Maurice Germot †	(France) Jeanne Matthey (x4) †	(France) Marcel Dupont (France) Maurice Germot †	(France) Jeanne Matthey (France) Daisy Speranza (x4) †	(France) Marguerite Mény (France) Édouard Mény de Marangue †
1911	(France) André Gobert	(France) Jeanne Matthey (x4) †	(France) Max Décugis (France) Maurice Germot † (x4)	(France) Jeanne Matthey (France) Daisy Speranza (x4) †	(France) Marguerite Broquedis (France) André Gobert †
1912	(France) Max Decugis (x3) †	(France) Jeanne Matthey (x4) †	(France) Max Décugis (France) Maurice Germot † (x4)	(France) Jeanne Matthey (France) Daisy Speranza (x4) †	(France) Daisy Speranza (France) William Laurentz (x2) †
1913	(France) Max Decugis (x3) †	(France) Marguerite Broquedis (x2) †	(France) Max Décugis (France) Maurice Germot † (x4)	(France) Blanche Amblard (France) Suzanne Amblard (x2) †	(France) Daisy Speranza (France) William Laurentz (x2) †
1914	(France) Max Decugis (x3) †	(France) Marguerite Broquedis (x2) †	(France) Max Décugis (France) Maurice Germot † (x4)	(France) Blanche Amblard (France) Suzanne Amblard (x2) †	(France) Suzanne Lenglen (France) Max Decugis †
1915	No tournament due to World War I				
1916	No tournament due to World War I				
1917	No tournament due to World War I				
1918	No tournament due to World War I				
1919	No tournament due to World War I				
1920	(France) André Gobert †	(France) Suzanne Lenglen (x4) †	(France) Max Décugis (France) Maurice Germot †	(France) Élisabeth d'Ayen (France) Suzanne Lenglen †	(France) Suzanne Lenglen (France) Max Decugis †
1921	(France) Jean Samazeuilh †	(France) Suzanne Lenglen (x4) †	(France) André Gobert (France) William Laurentz †	(France) Suzanne Lenglen (France) Geramine Pigueron (x2) †	(France) Suzanne Lenglen (France) Jacques Brugnon (x3) †
1922	(France) Henri Cochet †	(France) Suzanne Lenglen (x4) †	(France) Jacques Brugnon (France) Marcel Dupont †	(France) Suzanne Lenglen (France) Geramine Pigueron (x2) †	(France) Suzanne Lenglen (France) Jacques Brugnon (x3) †
1923	(France) François Blanchy †	(France) Suzanne Lenglen (x4) †	(France) François Blanchy (France) Jean Samazeuilh †	(France) Suzanne Lenglen (France) Didi Vlasto †	(France) Suzanne Lenglen (France) Jacques Brugnon (x3) †
1924	(France) Jean Borotra †	(France) Julie Vlasto †	(France) Jean Borotra (France) René Lacoste †	(France) Marguerite Billout (France) Yvonne Bourgeois †	(France) Marguerite Broquedis (France) Jean Borotra †
1925	↓ Open to non French club players↓				
1925	(France) René Lacoste	(France) Suzanne Lenglen (x2)	(France) Jean Borotra (France) René Lacoste	(France) Suzanne Lenglen (France) Didi Vlasto (x2)	(France) Suzanne Lenglen (France) Jacques Brugnon (x2)
1926	(France) Henri Cochet	(France) Suzanne Lenglen (x2)	(United States) Vincent Richards (United States) Howard Kinsey	(France) Suzanne Lenglen (France) Didi Vlasto (x2)	(France) Suzanne Lenglen (France) Jacques Brugnon (x2)
1927	(France) René Lacoste	(Netherlands) Kornelia Bouman	(France) Henri Cochet (France) Jacques Brugnon	(South Africa) Irene Bowder Peacock (South Africa) Bobbie Heine	(France) Marguerite Broquedis Bordes (France) Jean Borotra
1928	(France) Henri Cochet	(United States) Helen Wills Moody (x3)	(France) Jean Borotra (France) Jacques Brugnon	(United Kingdom) Phoebe Holcroft Watson (United Kingdom) Eileen Bennett Whittingstall	(United Kingdom) Eileen Bennett Whittingstall (France) Henri Cochet (x2)
1929	(France) René Lacoste	(United States) Helen Wills Moody (x3)	(France) René Lacoste (France) Jean Borotra	(Spain) Lilí de Álvarez (Netherlands) Kea Bouman	(United Kingdom) Eileen Bennett Whittingstall (France) Henri Cochet (x2)
1930	(France) Henri Cochet	(United States) Helen Wills Moody (x3)	(France) Henri Cochet (France) Jacques Brugnon	(United States) Helen Wills Moody (United States) Elizabeth Ryan	(Germany) Cilly Aussem (United States) Bill Tilden
1931	(France) Jean Borotra	(Weimar Republic) Cilly Aussem	(United States) George Lott (United States) John Van Ryn	(United Kingdom) Eileen Bennett Whittingstall (United Kingdom) Betty Nuthall	(United Kingdom) Betty Nuthall Shoemaker (South Africa) Pat Spence
1932	(France) Henri Cochet	(United States) Helen Wills Moody	(France) Henri Cochet (France) Jacques Brugnon	(United States) Helen Wills Moody (United States) Elizabeth Ryan	(United Kingdom) Betty Nuthall Shoemaker (United Kingdom) Fred Perry
1933	(Australia) Jack Crawford	(United Kingdom) Peggy Scriven Vivian (x2)	(United Kingdom) Pat Hughes (United Kingdom) Fred Perry	(France) Simonne Mathieu (United States) Elizabeth Ryan (x2)	(United Kingdom) Margaret Scriven-Vivian (Australia) Jack Crawford
1934	(Germany) Gottfried von Cramm	(United Kingdom) Peggy Scriven Vivian (x2)	(France) Jean Borotra (France) Jacques Brugnon	(France) Simonne Mathieu (United States) Elizabeth Ryan (x2)	(France) Colette Rosambert (France) Jean Borotra
1935	(United Kingdom) Fred Perry	(Nazi Germany) Hilde Krahwinkel Sperling (x3)	(Australia) Jack Crawford (Australia) Adrian Quist	(United Kingdom) Margaret Scriven-Vivian (United Kingdom) Kay Stammers	(Switzerland) Lolette Payot (France) Marcel Bernard
1936	(Germany) Gottfried von Cramm	(Nazi Germany) Hilde Krahwinkel Sperling (x3)	(France) Jean Borotra (France) Marcel Bernard	(France) Simonne Mathieu (United Kingdom) Billie Yorke (x3)	(United Kingdom) Billie Yorke (France) Marcel Bernard
1937	(Germany) Henner Henkel	(Nazi Germany) Hilde Krahwinkel Sperling (x3)	(Nazi Germany) Gottfried von Cramm (Nazi Germany) Henner Henkel	(France) Simonne Mathieu (United Kingdom) Billie Yorke (x3)	(France) Simonne Mathieu (France) Yvon Petra
1938	(United States) Don Budge	(France) Simonne Passemard Mathieu (x2)	(France) Bernard Destremau (France) Yvon Petra	(France) Simonne Mathieu (United Kingdom) Billie Yorke (x3)	(France) Simonne Mathieu (Kingdom of Yugoslavia) Dragutin Mitić
1939	(United States) Don McNeill	(France) Simonne Passemard Mathieu (x2)	(United States) Don McNeill (United States) Charles Harris	(France) Simonne Mathieu (Poland) Jadwiga Jędrzejowska	(United States) Sarah Palfrey Fabyan (United States) Elwood Cooke
1940	No tournament due to World War II				
1941	(France) Bernard Destremau (x2) ††	(Luxembourg) Alice Weiwers (x2) ††	(France) Christian Boussus (France) Bernard Destremau ††	(France) Cosette St. Omer Roy (Luxembourg) Alice Weiwers (x3) ††	(Luxembourg) Alice Weiwers (France) Robert Abdesselam ††
1942	(France) Bernard Destremau (x2) ††	(Luxembourg) Alice Weiwers (x2) ††	(France) Bernard Destremau (France) Yvon Petra ††	(France) Cosette St. Omer Roy (Luxembourg) Alice Weiwers (x3) ††	(France) N. Lafargue (France) Henri Pellizza (x2) ††
1943	(France) Yvon Petra (x3) ††	(France) Simone Iribarne Lafargue ††	(France) Marcel Bernard (France) Yvon Petra (x2) ††	(France) Cosette St. Omer Roy (Luxembourg) Alice Weiwers (x3) ††	(France) N. Lafargue (France) Henri Pellizza (x2) ††
1944	(France) Yvon Petra (x3) ††	(France) Raymonde Veber Jones ††	(France) Marcel Bernard (France) Yvon Petra (x2) ††	(France) Genevieve Grosbois (France) Claude Manescu ††	(France) Suzanne Pannetier (France) Antoine Gentien ††
1945	(France) Yvon Petra (x3) ††	(Switzerland) Lolette Payot ††	(France) Henri Cochet (France) Pierre Pellizza ††	(France) Paulette Fritz (France) Simone Iribarne Lafargue ††	(Switzerland) Lolette Payot (France) A. Jacquemet ††
1946	(France) Marcel Bernard	(United States) Margaret Osborne duPont	(France) Marcel Bernard (France) Yvon Petra	(United States) Louise Brough (United States) Margaret Osborne duPont (x2)	(United States) Pauline Betz Addie (United States) Budge Patty
1947	(Hungary) József Asbóth	(United States) Patricia Canning Todd	(South Africa) Eustace Fannin (South Africa) Eric Sturgess	(United States) Louise Brough (United States) Margaret Osborne duPont (x2)	(South Africa) Sheila Piercey Summers (South Africa) Eric Sturgess
1948	(United States) Frank Parker (x2)	(France) Nelly Landry	(Sweden) Lennart Bergelin (Czechoslovakia) Jaroslav Drobný	(United States) Doris Hart (United States) Patricia Canning Todd	(United States) Patricia Canning Todd (Czechoslovakia) Jaroslav Drobný
1949	(United States) Frank Parker (x2)	(United States) Margaret Osborne duPont	(United States) Pancho Gonzalez (United States) Frank Parker	(United States) Margaret Osborne duPont (United States) Louise Brough	(South Africa) Sheila Piercey Summers (South Africa) Eric Sturgess
1950	(United States) Budge Patty	(United States) Doris Hart	(United States) Bill Talbert (United States) Tony Trabert	(United States) Doris Hart (United States) Shirley Fry (x4)	(United States) Barbara Scofield (Argentina) Enrique Morea
1951	(Egypt) Jaroslav Drobný (x2)	(United States) Shirley Fry	(Australia) Ken McGregor (Australia) Frank Sedgman (x2)	(United States) Doris Hart (United States) Shirley Fry (x4)	(United States) Doris Hart (Australia) Frank Sedgman (x2)
1952	(Egypt) Jaroslav Drobný (x2)	(United States) Doris Hart	(Australia) Ken McGregor (Australia) Frank Sedgman (x2)	(United States) Doris Hart (United States) Shirley Fry (x4)	(United States) Doris Hart (Australia) Frank Sedgman (x2)
1953	(Australia) Ken Rosewall	(United States) Maureen Connolly (x2)	(Australia) Lew Hoad (Australia) Ken Rosewall	(United States) Doris Hart (United States) Shirley Fry (x4)	(United States) Doris Hart (United States) Vic Seixas
1954	(United States) Tony Trabert (x2)	(United States) Maureen Connolly (x2)	(United States) Vic Seixas (United States) Tony Trabert (x2)	(United States) Maureen Connolly (Australia) Nell Hall Hopman	(United States) Maureen Connolly (Australia) Lew Hoad
1955	(United States) Tony Trabert (x2)	(United Kingdom) Angela Mortimer	(United States) Vic Seixas (United States) Tony Trabert (x2)	(United States) Beverly Baker Fleitz (United States) Darlene Hard	(United States) Darlene Hard (South Africa) Gordon Forbes
1956	(Australia) Lew Hoad	(United States) Althea Gibson	(Australia) Don Candy (United States) Bob Perry	(United Kingdom) Angela Buxton (United States) Althea Gibson	(Australia) Thelma Coyne Long (Chile) Luis Ayala
1957	(Sweden) Sven Davidson	(United Kingdom) Shirley Bloomer Brasher	(Australia) Mal Anderson (Australia) Ashley Cooper	(United Kingdom) Shirley Bloomer (United States) Darlene Hard	(Czechoslovakia) Věra Suková (Czechoslovakia) Jiří Javorský
1958	(Australia) Mervyn Rose	(Hungary) Zsuzsa Körmöczy	(Australia) Ashley Cooper (Australia) Neale Fraser	(Mexico) Rosie Reyes (Mexico) Yola Ramírez	(United Kingdom) Shirley Bloomer Brasher (Italy) Nicola Pietrangeli
1959	(Italy) Nicola Pietrangeli (x2)	(United Kingdom) Christine Truman	(Italy) Nicola Pietrangeli (Italy) Orlando Sirola	(South Africa) Sandra Reynolds (South Africa) Renée Schuurman	(Mexico) Yola Ramírez Ochoa (United Kingdom) William Knight
1960	(Italy) Nicola Pietrangeli (x2)	(United States) Darlene Hard	(Australia) Roy Emerson (Australia) Neale Fraser (x3)	(Brazil) Maria Bueno (United States) Darlene Hard	(Brazil) Maria Bueno (Australia) Bob Howe
1961	(Spain) Manuel Santana	(United Kingdom) Ann Haydon Jones	(Australia) Roy Emerson (Australia) Neale Fraser (x3)	(South Africa) Sandra Reynolds (South Africa) Renée Schuurman (x2)	(United States) Darlene Hard (Australia) Rod Laver
1962	(Australia) Rod Laver	(Australia) Margaret Smith Court	(Australia) Roy Emerson (Australia) Neale Fraser (x3)	(South Africa) Sandra Reynolds (South Africa) Renée Schuurman (x2)	(South Africa) Renée Schuurman Haygarth (Australia) Bob Howe
1963	(Australia) Roy Emerson	(Australia) Lesley Turner Bowrey	(Australia) Roy Emerson (Spain) Manuel Santana	(United Kingdom) Ann Haydon-Jones (South Africa) Renée Schuurman	(Australia) Margaret Court (Australia) Ken Fletcher (x3)
1964	(Spain) Manuel Santana	(Australia) Margaret Smith Court	(Australia) Roy Emerson (Australia) Ken Fletcher	(Australia) Margaret Smith (Australia) Lesley Turner (x2)	(Australia) Margaret Court (Australia) Ken Fletcher (x3)
1965	(Australia) Fred Stolle	(Australia) Lesley Turner Bowrey	(Australia) Roy Emerson (Australia) Fred Stolle	(Australia) Margaret Smith (Australia) Lesley Turner (x2)	(Australia) Margaret Court (Australia) Ken Fletcher (x3)
1966	(Australia) Tony Roche	(United Kingdom) Ann Haydon Jones	(United States) Clark Graebner (United States) Dennis Ralston	(Australia) Margaret Smith (Australia) Judy Tegart	(South Africa) Annette Van Zyl (South Africa) Frew McMillan
1967	(Australia) Roy Emerson	(France) Françoise Dürr	(Australia) John Newcombe (Australia) Tony Roche	(France) Françoise Dürr (Australia) Gail Sherriff	(United States) Billie Jean King (Australia) Owen Davidson
1968	↓ Open Era ↓				
1968	(Australia) Ken Rosewall	(United States) Nancy Richey	(Australia) Ken Rosewall (Australia) Fred Stolle	(France) Françoise Dürr (United Kingdom) Ann Haydon Jones (x2)	(France) Françoise Dürr (France) Jean-Claude Barclay
1969	(Australia) Rod Laver	(Australia) Margaret Court (x2)	(Australia) John Newcombe (Australia) Tony Roche	(France) Françoise Dürr (United Kingdom) Ann Haydon Jones (x2)	(Australia) Margaret Court (United States) Marty Riessen
1970	(Czechoslovakia) Jan Kodeš (x2)	(Australia) Margaret Court (x2)	(Romania) Ilie Năstase (Romania) Ion Țiriac	(France) Gail Chanfreau (France) Françoise Dürr (x2)	(United States) Billie Jean King (Australia) Bob Hewitt
1971	(Czechoslovakia) Jan Kodeš (x2)	(Australia) Evonne Goolagong Cawley	(United States) Arthur Ashe (United States) Marty Riessen	(France) Gail Chanfreau (France) Françoise Dürr (x2)	(France) Françoise Dürr (France) Jean-Claude Barclay
1972	(Spain) Andrés Gimeno	(United States) Billie Jean King	(South Africa) Bob Hewitt (South Africa) Frew McMillan	(United States) Billie Jean King (Netherlands) Betty Stöve	(Australia) Evonne Goolagong Cawley (Australia) Kim Warwick
1973	(Romania) Ilie Năstase	(Australia) Margaret Court	(Australia) John Newcombe (Netherlands) Tom Okker	(Australia) Margaret Court (United Kingdom) Virginia Wade	(France) Françoise Dürr (France) Jean-Claude Barclay
1974	(Sweden) Björn Borg (x2)	(United States) Chris Evert (x2)	(Australia) Dick Crealy (New Zealand) Onny Parun	(United States) Chris Evert (Soviet Union) Olga Morozova	(Czechoslovakia) Martina Navratilova (Colombia) Iván Molina
1975	(Sweden) Björn Borg (x2)	(United States) Chris Evert (x2)	(United States) Brian Gottfried (Mexico) Raúl Ramírez	(United States) Chris Evert (Czechoslovakia) Martina Navratilova	(Uruguay) Fiorella Bonicelli (Brazil) Thomas Koch
1976	(Italy) Adriano Panatta	(United Kingdom) Sue Barker	(United States) Fred McNair (United States) Sherwood Stewart	(Uruguay) Fiorella Bonicelli (France) Gail Chanfreau	(South Africa) Ilana Kloss (Australia) Kim Warwick
1977	(Argentina) Guillermo Vilas	(Socialist Federal Republic of Yugoslavia) Mima Jaušovec	(United States) Brian Gottfried (Mexico) Raúl Ramírez	(Czechoslovakia) Regina Maršíková (United States) Pam Teeguarden	(United States) Mary Carillo (United States) John McEnroe
1978	(Sweden) Björn Borg (x4)	(Romania) Virginia Ruzici	(United States) Gene Mayer (United States) Hank Pfister	(Socialist Federal Republic of Yugoslavia) Mima Jaušovec (Romania) Virginia Ruzici	(Czechoslovakia) Renáta Tomanová (Czechoslovakia) Pavel Složil
1979	(Sweden) Björn Borg (x4)	(United States) Chris Evert (x2)	(United States) Gene Mayer (United States) Sandy Mayer	(Netherlands) Betty Stöve (Australia) Wendy Turnbull	(Australia) Wendy Turnbull (Australia) Bob Hewitt
1980	(Sweden) Björn Borg (x4)	(United States) Chris Evert (x2)	(United States) Victor Amaya (United States) Hank Pfister	(United States) Kathy Jordan (United States) Anne Smith	(United States) Anne Smith (United States) Billy Martin
1981	(Sweden) Björn Borg (x4)	(Czechoslovakia) Hana Mandlíková	(Switzerland) Heinz Günthardt (Hungary) Balázs Taróczy	(South Africa) Rosalyn Fairbank (South Africa) Tanya Harford	(United States) Andrea Jaeger (United States) Jimmy Arias
1982	(Sweden) Mats Wilander	(United States) Martina Navratilova	(United States) Sherwood Stewart (United States) Ferdi Taygan	(United States) Martina Navratilova (United States) Anne Smith	(Australia) Wendy Turnbull (United Kingdom) John Lloyd
1983	(France) Yannick Noah	(United States) Chris Evert	(Sweden) Anders Järryd (Sweden) Hans Simonsson	(South Africa) Rosalyn Fairbank (United States) Candy Reynolds	(United States) Barbara Jordan (United States) Eliot Teltscher
1984	(Czechoslovakia) Ivan Lendl	(United States) Martina Navratilova	(France) Henri Leconte (France) Yannick Noah	(United States) Martina Navratilova (United States) Pam Shriver (x2)	(United States) Anne Smith (United States) Dick Stockton
1985	(Sweden) Mats Wilander	(United States) Chris Evert (x2)	(Australia) Mark Edmondson (Australia) Kim Warwick	(United States) Martina Navratilova (United States) Pam Shriver (x2)	(United States) Martina Navratilova (Switzerland) Heinz Günthardt
1986	(Czechoslovakia) Ivan Lendl (x2)	(United States) Chris Evert (x2)	(Australia) John Fitzgerald (Czechoslovakia) Tomáš Šmíd	(United States) Martina Navratilova (Hungary) Andrea Temesvári	(United States) Kathy Jordan (United States) Ken Flach
1987	(Czechoslovakia) Ivan Lendl (x2)	(West Germany) Steffi Graf (x2)	(Sweden) Anders Järryd (United States) Robert Seguso	(United States) Martina Navratilova (United States) Pam Shriver (x2)	(United States) Pam Shriver (Spain) Emilio Sánchez
1988	(Sweden) Mats Wilander	(West Germany) Steffi Graf (x2)	(Ecuador) Andrés Gómez (Spain) Emilio Sánchez	(United States) Martina Navratilova (United States) Pam Shriver (x2)	(United States) Lori McNeil (Mexico) Jorge Lozano
1989	(United States) Michael Chang	(Spain) Arantxa Sánchez Vicario	(United States) Jim Grabb (United States) Patrick McEnroe	(Soviet Union) Larisa Savchenko Neiland (Soviet Union) Natalia Zvereva	(Netherlands) Manon Bollegraf (Netherlands) Tom Nijssen
1990	(Ecuador) Andrés Gómez	(Socialist Federal Republic of Yugoslavia) / (Federal Republic of Yugoslavia) Monica Seles (x3)	(Spain) Sergio Casal (Spain) Emilio Sánchez	(Czechoslovakia) Jana Novotná (Czechoslovakia) Helena Suková	(Spain) Arantxa Sánchez Vicario (Mexico) Jorge Lozano
1991	(United States) Jim Courier (x2)	(Socialist Federal Republic of Yugoslavia) / (Federal Republic of Yugoslavia) Monica Seles (x3)	(Australia) John Fitzgerald (Sweden) Anders Järryd	(United States) Gigi Fernández (Czechoslovakia) Jana Novotná	(Czechoslovakia) Helena Suková (Czechoslovakia) Cyril Suk
1992	(United States) Jim Courier (x2)	(Socialist Federal Republic of Yugoslavia) / (Federal Republic of Yugoslavia) Monica Seles (x3)	(Switzerland) Jakob Hlasek (Switzerland) Marc Rosset	(United States) Gigi Fernández (Commonwealth of Independent States) / (Belarus) Natasha Zvereva (x4)	(Spain) Arantxa Sánchez Vicario (Australia) Mark Woodforde
1993	(Spain) Sergi Bruguera (x2)	(Germany) Steffi Graf	(United States) Luke Jensen (United States) Murphy Jensen	(United States) Gigi Fernández (Commonwealth of Independent States) / (Belarus) Natasha Zvereva (x4)	(Russia) Eugenia Maniokova (Russia) Andrei Olhovskiy
1994	(Spain) Sergi Bruguera (x2)	(Spain) Arantxa Sánchez Vicario	(Zimbabwe) Byron Black (United States) Jonathan Stark	(United States) Gigi Fernández (Commonwealth of Independent States) / (Belarus) Natasha Zvereva (x4)	(Netherlands) Kristie Boogert (Netherlands) Menno Oosting
1995	(Austria) Thomas Muster	(Germany) Steffi Graf (x2)	(Netherlands) Jacco Eltingh (Netherlands) Paul Haarhuis	(United States) Gigi Fernández (Commonwealth of Independent States) / (Belarus) Natasha Zvereva (x4)	(Latvia) Larisa Savchenko Neiland (Australia) Todd Woodbridge
1996	(Russia) Yevgeny Kafelnikov	(Germany) Steffi Graf (x2)	(Russia) Yevgeny Kafelnikov (Czech Republic) Daniel Vacek (x2)	(United States) Lindsay Davenport (United States) Mary Joe Fernández	(Argentina) Patricia Tarabini (Argentina) Javier Frana
1997	(Brazil) Gustavo Kuerten	(Croatia) Iva Majoli	(Russia) Yevgeny Kafelnikov (Czech Republic) Daniel Vacek (x2)	(United States) Gigi Fernández (Belarus) Nastasha Zvereva	(Japan) Rika Hiraki (India) Mahesh Bhupathi
1998	(Spain) Carlos Moyá	(Spain) Arantxa Sánchez Vicario	(Netherlands) Jacco Eltingh (Netherlands) Paul Haarhuis	(Switzerland) Martina Hingis (Czech Republic) Jana Novotná	(United States) Venus Williams (United States) Justin Gimelstob
1999	(United States) Andre Agassi	(Germany) Steffi Graf	(India) Mahesh Bhupathi (India) Leander Paes	(United States) Serena Williams (United States) Venus Williams	(Slovenia) Katarina Srebotnik (South Africa) Piet Norval
2000	(Brazil) Gustavo Kuerten (x2)	(France) Mary Pierce	(Australia) Todd Woodbridge (Australia) Mark Woodforde	(Switzerland) Martina Hingis (France) Mary Pierce	(South Africa) Mariaan de Swardt (South Africa) David Adams
2001	(Brazil) Gustavo Kuerten (x2)	(United States) Jennifer Capriati	(India) Mahesh Bhupathi (India) Leander Paes	(Spain) Virginia Ruano Pascual (Argentina) Paola Suárez (x2)	(Spain) Virginia Ruano Pascual (Spain) Tomás Carbonell
2002	(Spain) Albert Costa	(United States) Serena Williams	(Netherlands) Paul Haarhuis (Russia) Yevgeny Kafelnikov	(Spain) Virginia Ruano Pascual (Argentina) Paola Suárez (x2)	(Zimbabwe) Cara Black (Zimbabwe) Wayne Black
2003	(Spain) Juan Carlos Ferrero	(Belgium) Justine Henin	(United States) Bob Bryan (United States) Mike Bryan	(Belgium) Kim Clijsters (Japan) Ai Sugiyama	(United States) Lisa Raymond (United States) Mike Bryan
2004	(Argentina) Gastón Gaudio	(Russia) Anastasia Myskina	(Belgium) Xavier Malisse (Belgium) Olivier Rochus	(Spain) Virginia Ruano Pascual (Argentina) Paola Suárez (x2)	(France) Tatiana Golovin (France) Richard Gasquet
2005	(Spain) Rafael Nadal (x4)	(Belgium) Justine Henin (x3)	(Sweden) Jonas Björkman (Belarus) Max Mirnyi (x2)	(Spain) Virginia Ruano Pascual (Argentina) Paola Suárez (x2)	(Slovakia) Daniela Hantuchová (France) Fabrice Santoro
2006	(Spain) Rafael Nadal (x4)	(Belgium) Justine Henin (x3)	(Sweden) Jonas Björkman (Belarus) Max Mirnyi (x2)	(United States) Lisa Raymond (Australia) Samantha Stosur	(Slovenia) Katarina Srebotnik (Serbia and Montenegro) Nenad Zimonjić
2007	(Spain) Rafael Nadal (x4)	(Belgium) Justine Henin (x3)	(The Bahamas) Mark Knowles (Canada) Daniel Nestor	(Australia) Alicia Molik (Italy) Mara Santangelo	(France) Nathalie Dechy (Israel) Andy Ram
2008	(Spain) Rafael Nadal (x4)	(Serbia) Ana Ivanovic	(Uruguay) Pablo Cuevas (Peru) Luis Horna	(Spain) Anabel Medina Garrigues (Spain) Virginia Ruano Pascual (x2)	(Belarus) Victoria Azarenka (United States) Bob Bryan
2009	(Switzerland) Roger Federer	(Russia) Svetlana Kuznetsova	(Czech Republic) Lukáš Dlouhý (India) Leander Paes	(Spain) Anabel Medina Garrigues (Spain) Virginia Ruano Pascual (x2)	(United States) Liezel Huber (United States) Bob Bryan
2010	(Spain) Rafael Nadal (x5)	(Italy) Francesca Schiavone	(Canada) Daniel Nestor (Serbia) Nenad Zimonjić	(United States) Serena Williams (United States) Venus Williams	(Slovenia) Katarina Srebotnik (Serbia) Nenad Zimonjić
2011	(Spain) Rafael Nadal (x5)	(China) Li Na	(Belarus) Max Mirnyi (Canada) Daniel Nestor (x2)	(Czech Republic) Andrea Hlaváčková (Czech Republic) Lucie Hradecká	(Australia) Casey Dellacqua (United States) Scott Lipsky
2012	(Spain) Rafael Nadal (x5)	(Russia) Maria Sharapova	(Belarus) Max Mirnyi (Canada) Daniel Nestor (x2)	(Italy) Sara Errani (Italy) Roberta Vinci	(India) Sania Mirza (India) Mahesh Bhupathi
2013	(Spain) Rafael Nadal (x5)	(United States) Serena Williams	(United States) Bob Bryan (United States) Mike Bryan	(Russia) Ekaterina Makarova (Russia) Elena Vesnina	(Czech Republic) Lucie Hradecká (Czech Republic) František Čermák
2014	(Spain) Rafael Nadal (x5)	(Russia) Maria Sharapova	(France) Julien Benneteau (France) Édouard Roger-Vasselin	(Chinese Taipei) Hsieh Su-wei (China) Peng Shuai	(Germany) Anna-Lena Grönefeld (Netherlands) Jean-Julien Rojer
2015	(Switzerland) Stan Wawrinka	(United States) Serena Williams	(Croatia) Ivan Dodig (Brazil) Marcelo Melo	(United States) Bethanie Mattek-Sands (Czech Republic) Lucie Šafářová	(United States) Bethanie Mattek-Sands (United States) Mike Bryan
2016	(Serbia) Novak Djokovic	(Spain) Garbiñe Muguruza	(Spain) Feliciano López (Spain) Marc López	(France) Caroline Garcia (France) Kristina Mladenovic	(Switzerland) Martina Hingis (India) Leander Paes
2017	(Spain) Rafael Nadal (x4)	(Latvia) Jeļena Ostapenko	(United States) Ryan Harrison (New Zealand) Michael Venus	(United States) Bethanie Mattek-Sands (Czech Republic) Lucie Šafářová	(Canada) Gabriela Dabrowski (India) Rohan Bopanna
2018	(Spain) Rafael Nadal (x4)	(Romania) Simona Halep	(France) Pierre-Hugues Herbert (France) Nicolas Mahut	(Czech Republic) Barbora Krejčíková (Czech Republic) Kateřina Siniaková	(Chinese Taipei) Latisha Chan (Croatia) Ivan Dodig (x3)
2019	(Spain) Rafael Nadal (x4)	(Australia) Ashleigh Barty	(Germany) Kevin Krawietz (Germany) Andreas Mies (x2)	(Hungary) Tímea Babos (France) Kristina Mladenovic (x2)	(Chinese Taipei) Latisha Chan (Croatia) Ivan Dodig (x3)
2020	(Spain) Rafael Nadal (x4)	(Poland) Iga Świątek	(Germany) Kevin Krawietz (Germany) Andreas Mies (x2)	(Hungary) Tímea Babos (France) Kristina Mladenovic (x2)	(Chinese Taipei) Latisha Chan (Croatia) Ivan Dodig (x3)
2021	(Serbia) Novak Djokovic	(Czech Republic) Barbora Krejčíková	(France) Pierre-Hugues Herbert (France) Nicolas Mahut	(Czech Republic) Barbora Krejčíková (Czech Republic) Kateřina Siniaková	(United States) Desirae Krawczyk (United Kingdom) Joe Salisbury
2022	(Spain) Rafael Nadal	(Poland) Iga Świątek (x3)	(El Salvador) Marcelo Arévalo (Netherlands) Jean-Julien Rojer	(France) Caroline Garcia (France) Kristina Mladenovic	(Japan) Ena Shibahara (Netherlands) Wesley Koolhof
2023	(Serbia) Novak Djokovic	(Poland) Iga Świątek (x3)	(Croatia) Ivan Dodig (United States) Austin Krajicek	(Chinese Taipei) Hsieh Su-wei (China) Wang Xinyu	(Japan) Miyu Kato (Germany) Tim Pütz
2024	(Spain) Carlos Alcaraz (x2)	(Poland) Iga Świątek (x3)	(El Salvador) Marcelo Arévalo (Croatia) Mate Pavić	(United States) Coco Gauff (Czech Republic) Kateřina Siniaková	(Germany) Laura Siegemund (France) Édouard Roger-Vasselin
2025	(Spain) Carlos Alcaraz (x2)	(United States) Coco Gauff	(Spain) Marcel Granollers (Argentina) Horacio Zeballos (x2)	(Italy) Sara Errani (Italy) Jasmine Paolini	(Italy) Sara Errani (Italy) Andrea Vavassori (x2)
2026	(Germany) Alexander Zverev	Mirra Andreeva	(Spain) Marcel Granollers (Argentina) Horacio Zeballos (x2)	(Czech Republic) Kateřina Siniaková (United States) Taylor Townsend	(Italy) Sara Errani (Italy) Andrea Vavassori (x2)

=== Wheelchair ===
Year	Singles			Doubles		
Year	Men	Women	Quad	Men	Women	Quad
2007	(Japan) Shingo Kunieda (x4)	(Netherlands) Esther Vergeer (x6)	No competition	(France) Stéphane Houdet (France) Michaël Jérémiasz	(Netherlands) Maaike Smit (Netherlands) Esther Vergeer	No competition
2008	(Japan) Shingo Kunieda (x4)	(Netherlands) Esther Vergeer (x6)	No competition	(Japan) Shingo Kunieda (Netherlands) Maikel Scheffers	(Netherlands) Jiske Griffioen (Netherlands) Esther Vergeer	No competition
2009	(Japan) Shingo Kunieda (x4)	(Netherlands) Esther Vergeer (x6)	No competition	(France) Stéphane Houdet (France) Michaël Jeremiasz	(Netherlands) Korie Homan (Netherlands) Esther Vergeer	No competition
2010	(Japan) Shingo Kunieda (x4)	(Netherlands) Esther Vergeer (x6)	No competition	(France) Stéphane Houdet (Japan) Shingo Kunieda	(Australia) Daniela Di Toro (Netherlands) Aniek van Koot	No competition
2011	(Netherlands) Maikel Scheffers	(Netherlands) Esther Vergeer (x6)	No competition	(Japan) Shingo Kunieda (France) Nicolas Peifer	(Netherlands) Esther Vergeer (Netherlands) Sharon Walraven	No competition
2012	(France) Stéphane Houdet (x2)	(Netherlands) Esther Vergeer (x6)	No competition	(France) Frédéric Cattanéo (Japan) Shingo Kunieda	(Netherlands) Marjolein Buis (Netherlands) Esther Vergeer	No competition
2013	(France) Stéphane Houdet (x2)	(Germany) Sabine Ellerbrock	No competition	(France) Stéphane Houdet (Japan) Shingo Kunieda	(Netherlands) Jiske Griffioen (Netherlands) Aniek van Koot	No competition
2014	(Japan) Shingo Kunieda (x2)	(Japan) Yui Kamiji	No competition	(Belgium) Joachim Gérard (France) Stéphane Houdet	(Japan) Yui Kamiji (United Kingdom) Jordanne Whiley	No competition
2015	(Japan) Shingo Kunieda (x2)	(Netherlands) Jiske Griffioen	No competition	(Japan) Shingo Kunieda (United Kingdom) Gordon Reid (x2)	(Netherlands) Jiske Griffioen (Netherlands) Aniek van Koot	No competition
2016	(Argentina) Gustavo Fernández	(Netherlands) Marjolein Buis	No competition	(Japan) Shingo Kunieda (United Kingdom) Gordon Reid (x2)	(Japan) Yui Kamiji (United Kingdom) Jordanne Whiley	No competition
2017	(United Kingdom) Alfie Hewett	(Japan) Yui Kamiji (x2)	No competition	(France) Stéphane Houdet (France) Nicolas Peifer (x2)	(Netherlands) Marjolein Buis (Japan) Yui Kamiji	No competition
2018	(Japan) Shingo Kunieda	(Japan) Yui Kamiji (x2)	No competition	(France) Stéphane Houdet (France) Nicolas Peifer (x2)	(Netherlands) Diede de Groot (Netherlands) Aniek van Koot (x5)	No competition
2019	(Argentina) Gustavo Fernández	(Netherlands) Diede de Groot	(Australia) Dylan Alcott (x3)	(Argentina) Gustavo Fernández (Japan) Shingo Kunieda	(Netherlands) Diede de Groot (Netherlands) Aniek van Koot (x5)	(Australia) Dylan Alcott (United States) David Wagner
2020	(United Kingdom) Alfie Hewett (x2)	(Japan) Yui Kamiji	(Australia) Dylan Alcott (x3)	(United Kingdom) Alfie Hewett (United Kingdom) Gordon Reid (x7)	(Netherlands) Diede de Groot (Netherlands) Aniek van Koot (x5)	(Netherlands) Sam Schröder (United States) David Wagner
2021	(United Kingdom) Alfie Hewett (x2)	(Netherlands) Diede de Groot (x4)	(Australia) Dylan Alcott (x3)	(United Kingdom) Alfie Hewett (United Kingdom) Gordon Reid (x7)	(Netherlands) Diede de Groot (Netherlands) Aniek van Koot (x5)	(United Kingdom) Andy Lapthorne (United States) David Wagner
2022	(Japan) Shingo Kunieda	(Netherlands) Diede de Groot (x4)	(Netherlands) Niels Vink (x2)	(United Kingdom) Alfie Hewett (United Kingdom) Gordon Reid (x7)	(Netherlands) Diede de Groot (Netherlands) Aniek van Koot (x5)	(Netherlands) Sam Schröder (Netherlands) Niels Vink
2023	(Japan) Tokito Oda (x4)	(Netherlands) Diede de Groot (x4)	(Netherlands) Niels Vink (x2)	(United Kingdom) Alfie Hewett (United Kingdom) Gordon Reid (x7)	(Japan) Yui Kamiji (South Africa) Kgothatso Montjane	(United Kingdom) Andy Lapthorne (South Africa) Donald Ramphadi
2024	(Japan) Tokito Oda (x4)	(Netherlands) Diede de Groot (x4)	(Israel) Guy Sasson (x2)	(United Kingdom) Alfie Hewett (United Kingdom) Gordon Reid (x7)	(Netherlands) Diede de Groot (Netherlands) Aniek van Koot	(Netherlands) Sam Schröder (Netherlands) Niels Vink
2025	(Japan) Tokito Oda (x4)	(Japan) Yui Kamiji	(Israel) Guy Sasson (x2)	(United Kingdom) Alfie Hewett (United Kingdom) Gordon Reid (x7)	(Japan) Yui Kamiji (South Africa) Kgothatso Montjane	(Israel) Guy Sasson (Netherlands) Niels Vink (x2)
2026	(Japan) Tokito Oda (x4)	(Netherlands) Diede de Groot	(Netherlands) Niels Vink	(United Kingdom) Alfie Hewett (United Kingdom) Gordon Reid (x7)	(Japan) Yui Kamiji (China) Zhu Zhenzhen	(Israel) Guy Sasson (Netherlands) Niels Vink (x2)

=== Junior ===
Year	Singles		Doubles	
Year	Boys	Girls	Boys	Girls
1947	(Belgium) Jacky Brichant	No competition	No competition	No competition
1948	(Denmark) Kurt Nielsen	No competition	No competition	No competition
1949	(France) Jean-Claude Molinari	No competition	No competition	No competition
1950	(France) Roland Dubuisson	No competition	No competition	No competition
1951	(United States) Ham Richardson	No competition	No competition	No competition
1952	(Australia) Ken Rosewall ‡	No competition	No competition	No competition
1953	(France) Jean-Noël Grinda	(France) Christine Brunon	No competition	No competition
1954	(Australia) Roy Emerson ‡	(France) Beatrice de Chambure	No competition	No competition
1955	(Spain) Andrés Gimeno ‡	(Italy) Maria-Teresa Reidl	No competition	No competition
1956	(Tunisia) Mustapha Belkhodja	(France) Elaine Launay	No competition	No competition
1957	(Spain) Alberto Arilla	(West Germany) Ilse Buding	No competition	No competition
1958	(United States) Butch Buchholz	(Italy) Francesca Gordigiani	No competition	No competition
1959	(West Germany) Ingo Buding (x2)	(South Africa) Joan Cross	No competition	No competition
1960	(West Germany) Ingo Buding (x2)	(France) Françoise Dürr ‡	No competition	No competition
1961	(Australia) John Newcombe (x2)	(Australia) Robyn Ebbern	No competition	No competition
1962	(Australia) John Newcombe (x2)	(Australia) Kaye Dening	No competition	No competition
1963	(Greece) Nicky Kalogeropoulos	(France) Monique Salfati	No competition	No competition
1964	(United States) Cliff Richey	(France) Nicole Seghers	No competition	No competition
1965	(United Kingdom) Gerald Battrick	(South Africa) Esme Emanuel	No competition	No competition
1966	(Soviet Union) Vladimir Korotkov	(France) Odile de Roubin	No competition	No competition
1967	(France) Patrick Proisy	(United Kingdom) Corinne Molesworth	No competition	No competition
1968	(Australia) Phil Dent	(Australia) Lesley Hunt	No competition	No competition
1969	(Spain) Antonio Muñoz	(Japan) Kazuko Sawamatsu	No competition	No competition
1970	(Spain) Juan Herrera	(United Kingdom) Veronica Burton	No competition	No competition
1971	(Italy) Corrado Barazzutti	(Soviet Union) Yelena Granaturova	No competition	No competition
1972	(United Kingdom) Christopher Mottram	(Czechoslovakia) Renáta Tomanová	No competition	No competition
1973	(Paraguay) Víctor Pecci	(Socialist Federal Republic of Yugoslavia) Mima Jaušovec ‡	No competition	No competition
1974	(France) Christophe Casa	(Romania) Mariana Simionescu	No competition	No competition
1975	(France) Christophe Roger-Vasselin	(Czechoslovakia) Regina Maršíková	No competition	No competition
1976	(Switzerland) Heinz Günthardt	(United Kingdom) Michelle Tyler	No competition	No competition
1977	(United States) John McEnroe †	(United States) Anne Smith	No competition	No competition
1978	(Czechoslovakia) Ivan Lendl ‡	(Czechoslovakia) Hana Mandlíková ‡	No competition	No competition
1979	(India) Ramesh Krishnan	(Sweden) Lena Sandin	No competition	No competition
1980	(France) Henri Leconte	(United States) Kathleen Horvath	No competition	No competition
1981	(Sweden) Mats Wilander ‡	(United States) Bonnie Gadusek	(South Africa) Barry Moir (South Africa) Michael Robertson	(France) Sophie Amiach (France) Corinne Vanier
1982	(France) Tarik Benhabiles	(Bulgaria) Manuela Maleeva	(Australia) Pat Cash (Australia) John Frawley	(United States) Beth Herr (United States) Janet Lagasse
1983	(Sweden) Stefan Edberg †	(France) Pascale Paradis	(Australia) Mark Kratzmann (Australia) Simon Youl	(Sweden) Carin Anderholm (Sweden) Helena Olsson
1984	(Sweden) Kent Carlsson	(Argentina) Gabriela Sabatini	(United States) Luke Jensen ‡ (United States) Patrick McEnroe ‡	(Netherlands) Digna Ketelaar (Netherlands) Simone Schilder
1985	(Peru) Jaime Yzaga	(Italy) Laura Garrone	(Czechoslovakia) Petr Korda (Czechoslovakia) Cyril Suk	(Argentina) Mariana Pérez Roldán (Argentina) Patricia Tarabini
1986	(Argentina) Guillermo Pérez Roldán (x2)	(Argentina) Patricia Tarabini	(Argentina) Franco Davín (Argentina) Guillermo Pérez Roldán	(Soviet Union) Leila Meskhi (Soviet Union) Natasha Zvereva ‡
1987	(Argentina) Guillermo Pérez Roldán (x2)	(Soviet Union) Natasha Zvereva †	(United States) Jim Courier (United States) Jonathan Stark ‡	(Soviet Union) Natalia Medvedeva (Soviet Union) Natasha Zvereva ‡
1988	(Venezuela) Nicolás Pereira	(France) Julie Halard	(Australia) Jason Stoltenberg (Australia) Todd Woodbridge ‡	(France) Alexia Dechaume (France) Emmanuelle Derly
1989	(France) Fabrice Santoro	(United States) Jennifer Capriati ‡	(Australia) Johan Anderson (Australia) Todd Woodbridge ‡	(Australia) Nicole Pratt (Chinese Taipei) Wang Shi-ting
1990	(Italy) Andrea Gaudenzi	(Bulgaria) Magdalena Maleeva	(Canada) Sébastien Lareau (Canada) Sébastien Leblanc	(Romania) Ruxandra Dragomir (Romania) Irina Spîrlea
1991	(Soviet Union) Andriy Medvedev †	(Israel) Anna Smashnova	(Sweden) Thomas Enqvist (Sweden) Magnus Martinelle	(Spain) Eva Bes (Argentina) Inés Gorrochategui
1992	(Romania) Andrei Pavel	(Paraguay) Rossana de los Ríos	(Mexico) Enrique Abaroa (Australia) Grant Doyle	(Belgium) Laurence Courtois (Belgium) Nancy Feber (x2)
1993	(Spain) Roberto Carretero	(Switzerland) Martina Hingis †(x2)	(New Zealand) Steven Downs (New Zealand) James Greenhalgh	(Belgium) Laurence Courtois (Belgium) Nancy Feber (x2)
1994	(Spain) Jacobo Díaz	(Switzerland) Martina Hingis †(x2)	(Brazil) Gustavo Kuerten (Ecuador) Nicolás Lapentti	(Switzerland) Martina Hingis ‡ (Slovakia) Henrieta Nagyová
1995	(Argentina) Mariano Zabaleta	(France) Amélie Cocheteux	(Netherlands) Raemon Sluiter (Netherlands) Peter Wessels	(United States) Corina Morariu (Czech Republic) Ludmila Varmužová
1996	(Spain) Alberto Martín	(France) Amélie Mauresmo	(France) Sébastien Grosjean (France) Olivier Mutis	(Italy) Alice Canepa (Italy) Giulia Casoni
1997	(Germany) Daniel Elsner	(Belgium) Justine Henin ‡	(Venezuela) José de Armas (Peru) Luis Horna ‡	(Zimbabwe) Cara Black (Kazakhstan) Irina Selyutina
1998	(Chile) Fernando González	(Russia) Nadia Petrova	(Venezuela) José de Armas (Chile) Fernando González	(Belgium) Kim Clijsters ‡ (Australia) Jelena Dokic
1999	(Argentina) Guillermo Coria †	(Spain) Lourdes Domínguez Lino	(Georgia (country)) Irakli Labadze (Croatia) Lovro Zovko	(Italy) Flavia Pennetta (Italy) Roberta Vinci ‡
2000	(France) Paul-Henri Mathieu	(France) Virginie Razzano	(Spain) Marc López ‡ (Spain) Tommy Robredo	(Spain) María José Martínez Sánchez (Spain) Anabel Medina Garrigues ‡
2001	(Spain) Carlos Cuadrado	(Estonia) Kaia Kanepi	(Colombia) Alejandro Falla (Colombia) Carlos Salamanca	(Czech Republic) Petra Cetkovská (Czech Republic) Renata Voráčová
2002	(France) Richard Gasquet	(Indonesia) Angelique Widjaja	(Germany) Markus Bayer (Germany) Philipp Petzschner	(Germany) Anna-Lena Grönefeld (Czech Republic) Barbora Strýcová
2003	(Switzerland) Stanislas Wawrinka ‡	(Germany) Anna-Lena Grönefeld	(Israel) Dudi Sela (Hungary) György Balázs	(Spain) Marta Fraga Pérez (Spain) Adriana González-Peñas
2004	(France) Gaël Monfils	(Bulgaria) Sesil Karatantcheva	(Spain) Pablo Andújar (Spain) Marcel Granollers	(Czech Republic) Kateřina Böhmová (Netherlands) Michaëlla Krajicek
2005	(Croatia) Marin Čilić	(Hungary) Ágnes Szávay	(Argentina) Emiliano Massa (Argentina) Leonardo Mayer	(Belarus) Victoria Azarenka (Hungary) Ágnes Szávay
2006	(Slovakia) Martin Kližan	(Poland) Agnieszka Radwańska	(Argentina) Emiliano Massa (Japan) Kei Nishikori	(Canada) Sharon Fichman (Russia) Anastasia Pavlyuchenkova
2007	(Belarus) Vladimir Ignatic	(France) Alizé Cornet	(Italy) Thomas Fabbiano (Belarus) Andrei Karatchenia	(Belarus) Ksenia Milevskaya (Poland) Urszula Radwańska
2008	(Chinese Taipei) Yang Tsung-hua	(Romania) Simona Halep ‡	(Finland) Henri Kontinen (Indonesia) Christopher Rungkat	(Slovenia) Polona Hercog (Australia) Jessica Moore
2009	(Sweden) Daniel Berta	(France) Kristina Mladenovic	(Croatia) Marin Draganja (Croatia) Dino Marcan	(Romania) Elena Bogdan (Thailand) Noppawan Lertcheewakarn
2010	(Argentina) Agustín Velotti	(Ukraine) Elina Svitolina	(Peru) Duilio Beretta (Ecuador) Roberto Quiroz	(Hungary) Tímea Babos ‡ (United States) Sloane Stephens
2011	(United States) Bjorn Fratangelo	(Tunisia) Ons Jabeur	(Spain) Andrés Artuñedo (Spain) Roberto Carballés	(Russia) Irina Khromacheva (Ukraine) Maryna Zanevska
2012	(Belgium) Kimmer Coppejans	(Germany) Annika Beck	(Australia) Andrew Harris (Australia) Nick Kyrgios	(Russia) Daria Gavrilova (Russia) Irina Khromacheva
2013	(Chile) Christian Garín	(Switzerland) Belinda Bencic	(United Kingdom) Kyle Edmund (Portugal) Frederico Ferreira Silva	(Czech Republic) Barbora Krejčíková ‡ (Czech Republic) Kateřina Siniaková ‡
2014	(Russia) Andrey Rublev	(Russia) Daria Kasatkina	(France) Benjamin Bonzi (France) Quentin Halys	(Romania) Ioana Ducu (Romania) Ioana Loredana Roșca
2015	(United States) Tommy Paul	(Spain) Paula Badosa	(Spain) Álvaro López San Martín (Spain) Jaume Munar	(Czech Republic) Miriam Kolodziejová (Czech Republic) Markéta Vondroušová
2016	(France) Geoffrey Blancaneaux	(Switzerland) Rebeka Masarova	(Israel) Yshai Oliel (Czech Republic) Patrik Rikl	(Spain) Paula Arias Manjón (Serbia) Olga Danilović
2017	(Australia) Alexei Popyrin	(United States) Whitney Osuigwe	(Spain) Nicola Kuhn (Hungary) Zsombor Piros	(Canada) Bianca Andreescu (Canada) Carson Branstine
2018	(Chinese Taipei) Tseng Chun-hsin	(United States) Coco Gauff ‡	(Czech Republic) Ondřej Štyler (Japan) Naoki Tajima	(United States) Caty McNally (Poland) Iga Świątek
2019	(Denmark) Holger Rune	(Canada) Leylah Fernandez	(Brazil) Matheus Pucinelli de Almeida (Argentina) Thiago Agustín Tirante	(United States) Chloe Beck (United States) Emma Navarro
2020	(Switzerland) Dominic Stricker	(France) Elsa Jacquemot	(Italy) Flavio Cobolli (Switzerland) Dominic Stricker	(Italy) Eleonora Alvisi (Italy) Lisa Pigato
2021	(France) Luca Van Assche	(Czech Republic) Linda Nosková	(France) Arthur Fils (France) Giovanni Mpetshi Perricard	(Philippines) Alex Eala (Russia) Oksana Selekhmeteva
2022	(France) Gabriel Debru	(Czech Republic) Lucie Havlíčková	(Lithuania) Edas Butvilas (Croatia) Mili Poljičak	(Czech Republic) Sára Bejlek (Czech Republic) Lucie Havlíčková
2023	(Croatia) Dino Prižmić	Alina Korneeva	Yaroslav Demin (Mexico) Rodrigo Pacheco Méndez	(United States) Tyra Caterina Grant (United States) Clervie Ngounoue
2024	(United States) Kaylan Bigun	(Czech Republic) Tereza Valentová	(Norway) Nicolai Budkov Kjær (Austria) Joel Schwärzler	(Slovakia) Renáta Jamrichová (Czech Republic) Tereza Valentová
2025	(Germany) Niels McDonald	(Austria) Lilli Tagger	(Finland) Oskari Paldanius (Poland) Alan Ważny	(Germany) Eva Bennemann (Germany) Sonja Zhenikhova
2026	(Brazil) Guto Miguel	Alisa Oktiabreva	(Germany) Jamie Mackenzie (Germany) Vincent Reisach	(Czech Republic) Jana Kovačková (Czech Republic) Kateřina Zajíčková

‡ = a player who won both the junior and senior title.
† = a player who won the junior title and reached the senior final.

=== Junior wheelchair ===
Year	Singles		Doubles	
Year	Boys	Girls	Boys	Girls
2024	(Austria) Maximilian Taucher (x2)	(France) Ksénia Chasteau	(United Kingdom) Ruben Harris (Austria) Maximilian Taucher	(France) Ksénia Chasteau (United States) Maylee Phelps
2025	(Austria) Maximilian Taucher (x2)	(Brazil) Vitória Miranda	(United States) Charlie Cooper (Austria) Maximilian Taucher	(Brazil) Vitória Miranda (Belgium) Luna Gryp
2026	(United Kingdom) Matthew Knoesen	(Belgium) Luna Gryp	(United Kingdom) Matthew Knoesen (Belgium) Alexander Lantermann	(Belgium) Luna Gryp (Japan) Seira Matsuoka

‡ = a player who won both the junior and senior title.
† = a player who won the junior title and reached the senior final.

== See also ==
Lists of champions of specific events

- List of French Open men's singles champions
- List of French Open women's singles champions
- List of French Open men's doubles champions
- List of French Open women's doubles champions
- List of French Open mixed doubles champions

Other Grand Slam tournament champions

- List of Australian Open champions
- List of Wimbledon champions
- List of US Open champions
