= List of French Open mixed doubles champions =

Through 1924, the French Championships were open only to French nationals or members of specific French clubs. Beginning in 1925, the French Championships were open to amateur players of all nationalities. With the 1968 event, the French Open allowed both amateurs and professional players to compete.

The table is set out as follows: (Female partner) & (Male partner).

== Champions ==
Regular competition
† Not considered to be a Grand Slam event. A French club members only-tournament called the French Championships
†† Disputed champions: Not considered to be a Grand Slam event. Not sanctioned or recognised by the FFT (Note: Due to World War II, the tournaments held from 1941 to 1945 are not officially recognized by the Fédération Française de Tennis. Consequently, despite being listed by a few sources, the champions from those years are not included in the official statistics. They are listed here as a historical note.)
Further information: Tournoi de France (tennis)

=== French Championships ===
Year	Champions	Runners-up	Score
1902	(France) Helene Prevost (United Kingdom) Réginald Forbes †	(France) Adine Masson (France) W. Masson	6-3, 6-3
1903	(France) Helene Prevost (United Kingdom) Réginald Forbes †		
1904	(France) Kate Gillou (France) Max Decugis †	(France) Yvonne de Pfeffel (France) André Vacherot	7-5, 8-6
1905	(France) Yvonne de Pfeffel (France) Max Decugis †		
1906	(France) Yvonne de Pfeffel (France) Max Decugis †	(France) Kate Gillou-Fenwick (France) Maurice Germot	6-3, 8-6
1907	(France) Adrienne Péan (France) Robert Wallet †		6-3, 6-5
1908	(France) Kate Gillou (France) Max Decugis †		
1909	(France) Jeanne Matthey (France) Max Decugis †		7-5, 7-5
1910	(France) Marguerite Mény (France) Édouard Mény de Marangue†		
1911	(France) Marguerite Broquedis (France) André Gobert †	(France) Marguerite Mény (France) Édouard Mény de Marangue	6–4, 6–3
1912	(France) Daisy Speranza (France) William Laurentz†		
1913	(France) Daisy Speranza (France) William Laurentz †		
1914	(France) Suzanne Lenglen (France) Max Decugis †	(France) Maurice Germot (France) Suzanne Amblard	6–4, 6–1
1915	No competition (due to World War I) (Note: The tournament was not held from 1915 to 1919 because of World War I.)		
1916	No competition (due to World War I)		
1917	No competition (due to World War I)		
1918	No competition (due to World War I)		
1919	No competition (due to World War I)		
1920	(France) Suzanne Lenglen (France) Max Decugis †	(France) Marie Conquet (France) Marcel Dupont	6–0, 6–3
1921	(France) Suzanne Lenglen (France) Jacques Brugnon †	(France) Marguerite Billout (France) Max Decugis	6–4, 6–1
1922	(France) Suzanne Lenglen (France) Jacques Brugnon †	(France) Germaine Golding (France) Jean Borotra	6–0, 6–0
1923	(France) Suzanne Lenglen (France) Jacques Brugnon †	(France) Yvonne Bourgeois (France) Henri Cochet	6–1, 7–5
1924	(France) Marguerite Broquedis (France) Jean Borotra †	(France) Nanette le Besnerais (France) Jacques Brugnon	6-3, 8-6
1925	(France) Suzanne Lenglen (France) Jacques Brugnon	(France) Didi Vlasto (France) Henri Cochet	6–2, 6–2
1926	(France) Suzanne Lenglen (France) Jacques Brugnon	(France) Nanette le Besnerais (France) Jean Borotra	6–4, 6–3
1927	(France) Marguerite Broquedis Bordes (France) Jean Borotra	(Spain) Lili de Alvarez (United States) Bill Tilden	6–4, 2–6, 6–2
1928	(United Kingdom) Eileen Bennett Whittingstall (France) Henri Cochet	(United States) Helen Wills Moody (United States) Frank Hunter	3–6, 6–3, 6–3
1929	(United Kingdom) Eileen Bennett Whittingstall (France) Henri Cochet	(United States) Helen Wills Moody (United States) Frank Hunter	6–3, 6–2
1930	(Germany) Cilly Aussem (United States) Bill Tilden	(United Kingdom) Eileen Bennett Whittingstall (France) Henri Cochet	6–4, 6–4
1931	(United Kingdom) Betty Nuthall (South Africa) Pat Spence	(United Kingdom) Dorothy Shepherd-Barron (United Kingdom) Bunny Austin	6–3, 5–7, 6–3
1932	(United Kingdom) Betty Nuthall (United Kingdom) Fred Perry	(United States) Helen Wills Moody (United States) Sidney Wood	6–4, 6–2
1933	(United Kingdom) Margaret Scriven-Vivian (Australia) Jack Crawford	(United Kingdom) Betty Nuthall (United Kingdom) Fred Perry	6–2, 6–3
1934	(France) Colette Rosambert (France) Jean Borotra	(United States) Elizabeth Ryan (Australia) Adrian Quist	6–2, 6–4
1935	(Switzerland) Lolette Payot (France) Marcel Bernard	(France) Sylvie Jung Henrotin (France) André Martin-Legeay	4–6, 6–2, 6–4
1936	(United Kingdom) Billie Yorke (France) Marcel Bernard	(France) Sylvie Jung Henrotin (France) André Martin-Legeay	7–5, 6–8, 6–3
1937	(France) Simonne Mathieu (France) Yvon Petra	(Germany) Marie-Louise Horn (France) Roland Journu	7–5, 7–5
1938	(France) Simonne Mathieu (Kingdom of Yugoslavia) Dragutin Mitić	(Australia) Nancye Wynne Bolton (France) Christian Boussus	2–6, 6–3, 6–4
1939	(United States) Sarah Palfrey Fabyan (United States) Elwood Cooke	(France) Simonne Mathieu (Kingdom of Yugoslavia) Franjo Kukuljević	4–6, 6–1, 7–5
1940	No competition (due to World War II)		
1941	(Luxembourg) Alice Weiwers (France) Robert Abdesselam ^{††}	(France) Suzanne Pannetier (France) Roger Dessair	6–2, 6–4
1942	(France) Simone Lafargue _{††} (France) Henri Pellizza	(Luxembourg) Alice Weiwers (France) Robert Abdesselam	6–0, 6–2
1943	(Luxembourg) Alice Weiwers _{††} (France) Henri Pellizza	(France) Simone Lafargue (France) Georges Grémillet	6–3, 6–1
1944	(France) Suzanne Pannetier _{††} (France) Antoine Gentien	(France) Jacqueline Patorni (France) Paul Féret	6–3, 7–5
1945	(France) Lolette Dodille-Payot (France) André Jacquemet ^{††}	(France) Anne-Marie Seghers (France) Roger Dubuc	4–6, 6–1, 6–1
1946	(United States) Pauline Betz Addie (United States) Budge Patty	(United States) Dorothy Bundy Cheney (United States) Tom Brown	7–5, 9–7
1947	(South Africa) Sheila Piercey Summers (South Africa) Eric Sturgess	(Poland) Jadwiga Jędrzejowska (Romania) Cristea Caralulis	6–0, 6–0
1948	(United States) Patricia Canning Todd (Czechoslovakia) Jaroslav Drobný	(United States) Doris Hart (Australia) Frank Sedgman	6–3, 3–6, 6–3
1949	(South Africa) Sheila Piercey Summers (South Africa) Eric Sturgess	(United Kingdom) Jean Quertier (United Kingdom) Gerry Oakley	6–1, 6–1
1950	(United States) Barbara Scofield (Argentina) Enrique Morea	(United States) Patricia Canning Todd (United States) Bill Talbert	walkover
1951	(United States) Doris Hart (Australia) Frank Sedgman	(Australia) Thelma Coyne Long (Australia) Mervyn Rose	7–5, 6–2
1952	(United States) Doris Hart (Australia) Frank Sedgman	(United States) Shirley Fry Irvin (South Africa) Eric Sturgess	6–8, 6–3, 6–3
1953	(United States) Doris Hart (United States) Vic Seixas	(United States) Maureen Connolly (Australia) Mervyn Rose	4–6, 6–4, 6–0
1954	(United States) Maureen Connolly (Australia) Lew Hoad	(France) Jacqueline Patorni (Australia) Rex Hartwig	6–4, 6–3
1955	(United States) Darlene Hard (South Africa) Gordon Forbes	(Australia) Jenny Staley Hoad (Chile) Luis Ayala	5–7, 6–1, 6–2
1956	(Australia) Thelma Coyne Long (Chile) Luis Ayala	(United States) Doris Hart (Australia) Bob Howe	4–6, 6–4, 6–1
1957	(Czechoslovakia) Věra Suková (Czechoslovakia) Jiří Javorský	(West Germany) Edda Buding (Chile) Luis Ayala	6–3, 6–4
1958	(United Kingdom) Shirley Bloomer Brasher (Italy) Nicola Pietrangeli	(Australia) Lorraine Coghlan Robinson (Australia) Bob Howe	8–6, 6–2
1959	(Mexico) Yola Ramírez Ochoa (United Kingdom) William Knight	(South Africa) Renée Schuurman (Australia) Rod Laver	6–4, 6–4
1960	(Brazil) Maria Bueno (Australia) Bob Howe	(United Kingdom) Ann Haydon-Jones (Australia) Roy Emerson	1–6, 6–1, 6–2
1961	(United States) Darlene Hard (Australia) Rod Laver	(Czechoslovakia) Věra Suková (Czechoslovakia) Jiří Javorský	6–0, 2–6, 6–3
1962	(South Africa) Renée Schuurman Haygarth (Australia) Bob Howe	(Australia) Lesley Turner Bowrey (Australia) Fred Stolle	3–6, 6–4, 6–4
1963	(Australia) Margaret Court (Australia) Ken Fletcher	(Australia) Lesley Turner Bowrey (Australia) Fred Stolle	6–1, 6–2
1964	(Australia) Margaret Court (Australia) Ken Fletcher	(Australia) Lesley Turner Bowrey (Australia) Fred Stolle	6–3, 4–6, 8–6
1965	(Australia) Margaret Court (Australia) Ken Fletcher	(Brazil) Maria Bueno (Australia) John Newcombe	6–4, 6–4
1966	(South Africa) Annette Van Zyl (South Africa) Frew McMillan	(United Kingdom) Ann Haydon-Jones (United States) Clark Graebner	1–6, 6–3, 6–2
1967	(United States) Billie Jean King (Australia) Owen Davidson	(United Kingdom) Ann Haydon-Jones (Romania) Ion Țiriac	6–3, 6–1

=== French Open ===
Year	Champions	Runners-up	Score
1968	(France) Françoise Dürr (France) Jean-Claude Barclay	(United States) Billie Jean King (Australia) Owen Davidson	6–1, 6–4
1969	(Australia) Margaret Court (United States) Marty Riessen	(France) Françoise Dürr (France) Jean-Claude Barclay	6–3, 6–2
1970	(United States) Billie Jean King (South Africa) Bob Hewitt	(France) Françoise Dürr (France) Jean-Claude Barclay	3–6, 6–4, 6–2
1971	(France) Françoise Dürr (2) (France) Jean-Claude Barclay (2)	(United Kingdom) Winnie Shaw (Soviet Union) Toomas Leius	6–2, 6–4
1972	(Australia) Evonne Goolagong Cawley (Australia) Kim Warwick	(France) Françoise Dürr (France) Jean-Claude Barclay	6–2, 6–4
1973	(France) Françoise Dürr (3) (France) Jean-Claude Barclay (3)	(Netherlands) Betty Stöve (France) Patrice Dominguez	6–1, 6–4
1974	(Czechoslovakia) Martina Navratilova (Colombia) Iván Molina	(France) Rosie Reyes Darmon (Mexico) Marcelo Lara	6–3, 6–3
1975	(Uruguay) Fiorella Bonicelli (Brazil) Thomas Koch	(United States) Pam Teeguarden (Chile) Jaime Fillol	6–4, 7–6
1976	(South Africa) Ilana Kloss (Australia) Kim Warwick (2)	(South Africa) Linky Boshoff (Rhodesia) Colin Dowdeswell	5–7, 7–6, 6–2
1977	(United States) Mary Carillo (United States) John McEnroe	(Romania) Florența Mihai (Colombia) Iván Molina	7–6, 6–4
1978	(Czechoslovakia) Renáta Tomanová (Czechoslovakia) Pavel Složil	(Romania) Virginia Ruzici (France) Patrice Dominguez	7–6, retired
1979	(Australia) Wendy Turnbull (South Africa) Bob Hewitt (2)	(Romania) Virginia Ruzici (Romania) Ion Țiriac	6–3, 2–6, 6–1
1980	(United States) Anne Smith (United States) Billy Martin	(Czechoslovakia) Renáta Tomanová (Czechoslovakia) Stanislav Birner	2–6, 6–4, 8–6
1981	(United States) Andrea Jaeger (United States) Jimmy Arias	(Netherlands) Betty Stöve (United States) Fred McNair	7–6, 6–4
1982	(Australia) Wendy Turnbull (United Kingdom) John Lloyd	(Brazil) Cláudia Monteiro (Brazil) Cássio Motta	6–2, 7–6
1983	(United States) Barbara Jordan (United States) Eliot Teltscher	(United States) Leslie Allen (United States) Charles Strode	6–2, 6–3
1984	(United States) Anne Smith (2) (United States) Dick Stockton	(Australia) Anne Minter (Australia) Laurie Warder	6–2, 6–4
1985	(United States) Martina Navratilova (2) (Switzerland) Heinz Günthardt	(United States) Paula Smith (Paraguay) Francisco González	2–6, 6–3, 6–2
1986	(United States) Kathy Jordan (United States) Ken Flach	(South Africa) Rosalyn Fairbank Nideffer (Australia) Mark Edmondson	3–6, 7–6^{(7–3)}, 6–3
1987	(United States) Pam Shriver (Spain) Emilio Sánchez Vicario	(United States) Lori McNeil (United States) Sherwood Stewart	6–3, 7–6^{(7–4)}
1988	(United States) Lori McNeil (Mexico) Jorge Lozano	(Netherlands) Brenda Schultz-McCarthy (Netherlands) Michiel Schapers	7–5, 6–2
1989	(Netherlands) Manon Bollegraf (Netherlands) Tom Nijssen	(Spain) Arantxa Sánchez Vicario (Argentina) Horacio de la Peña	6–3, 6–7^{(3–7)}, 6–2
1990	(Spain) Arantxa Sánchez Vicario (Mexico) Jorge Lozano (2)	(Australia) Nicole Provis (South Africa) Danie Visser	7–6^{(7–5)}, 7–6^{(10–8)}
1991	(Czechoslovakia) Helena Suková (Czechoslovakia) Cyril Suk	(Netherlands) Caroline Vis (Netherlands) Paul Haarhuis	3–6, 6–4, 6–1
1992	(Spain) Arantxa Sánchez Vicario (2) (Australia) Todd Woodbridge	(United States) Lori McNeil (United States) Bryan Shelton	6–2, 6–3
1993	(Russia) Eugenia Maniokova (Russia) Andrei Olhovskiy	(South Africa) Elna Reinach (South Africa) Danie Visser	6–2, 4–6, 6–4
1994	(Netherlands) Kristie Boogert (Netherlands) Menno Oosting	(Latvia) Larisa Savchenko Neiland (Russia) Andrei Olhovskiy	7–5, 3–6, 7–5
1995	(Latvia) Larisa Savchenko Neiland (Australia) Mark Woodforde	(Canada) Jill Hetherington (South Africa) John-Laffnie de Jager	7–6^{(10–8)}, 7–6^{(7–4)}
1996	(Argentina) Patricia Tarabini (Argentina) Javier Frana	(United States) Nicole Arendt (United States) Luke Jensen	6–2, 6–2
1997	(Japan) Rika Hiraki (India) Mahesh Bhupathi	(United States) Lisa Raymond (United States) Patrick Galbraith	6–4, 6–1
1998	(United States) Venus Williams (United States) Justin Gimelstob	(United States) Serena Williams (Argentina) Luis Lobo	6–4, 6–4
1999	(Slovenia) Katarina Srebotnik (South Africa) Piet Norval	(Latvia) Larisa Savchenko Neiland (United States) Rick Leach	6–3, 3–6, 6–3
2000	(South Africa) Mariaan de Swardt (South Africa) David Adams	(Australia) Rennae Stubbs (Australia) Todd Woodbridge	6–3, 3–6, 6–3
2001	(Spain) Virginia Ruano Pascual (Spain) Tomás Carbonell	(Argentina) Paola Suárez (Brazil) Jaime Oncins	7–5, 6–3
2002	(Zimbabwe) Cara Black (Zimbabwe) Wayne Black	(Russia) Elena Bovina (The Bahamas) Mark Knowles	6–3, 6–3
2003	(United States) Lisa Raymond (United States) Mike Bryan	(Russia) Elena Likhovtseva (India) Mahesh Bhupathi	6–3, 6–4
2004	(France) Tatiana Golovin (France) Richard Gasquet	(Zimbabwe) Cara Black (Zimbabwe) Wayne Black	6–3, 6–4
2005	(Slovakia) Daniela Hantuchová (France) Fabrice Santoro	(United States) Martina Navratilova (India) Leander Paes	3–6, 6–3, 6–2
2006	(Slovenia) Katarina Srebotnik (2) (Serbia and Montenegro) Nenad Zimonjić	(Russia) Elena Likhovtseva (Canada) Daniel Nestor	6–3, 6–4
2007	(France) Nathalie Dechy (Israel) Andy Ram	(Slovenia) Katarina Srebotnik (Serbia) Nenad Zimonjić	7–5, 6–3
2008	(Belarus) Victoria Azarenka (United States) Bob Bryan	(Slovenia) Katarina Srebotnik (Serbia) Nenad Zimonjić	6–2, 7–6^{(7–4)}
2009	(United States) Liezel Huber (United States) Bob Bryan (2)	(United States) Vania King (Brazil) Marcelo Melo	5–7, 7–6^{(7–5)}, [10–7]
2010	(Slovenia) Katarina Srebotnik (3) (Serbia) Nenad Zimonjić (2)	(Kazakhstan) Yaroslava Shvedova (Austria) Julian Knowle	4–6, 7–6^{(7–5)}, [11–9]
2011	(Australia) Casey Dellacqua (United States) Scott Lipsky	(Slovenia) Katarina Srebotnik (Serbia) Nenad Zimonjić	7–6^{(8–6)}, 4–6, [10–7]
2012	(India) Sania Mirza (India) Mahesh Bhupathi (2)	(Poland) Klaudia Jans-Ignacik (Mexico) Santiago González	7–6^{(7–3)}, 6–1
2013	(Czech Republic) Lucie Hradecká (Czech Republic) František Čermák	(France) Kristina Mladenovic (Canada) Daniel Nestor	1–6, 6–4, [10–6]
2014	(Germany) Anna-Lena Grönefeld (Netherlands) Jean-Julien Rojer	(Germany) Julia Görges (Serbia) Nenad Zimonjić	4–6, 6–2, [10–7]
2015	(United States) Bethanie Mattek-Sands (United States) Mike Bryan (2)	(Czech Republic) Lucie Hradecká (Poland) Marcin Matkowski	7–6^{(7–3)}, 6–1
2016	(Switzerland) Martina Hingis (India) Leander Paes	(India) Sania Mirza (Croatia) Ivan Dodig	4–6, 6–4, [10–8]
2017	(Canada) Gabriela Dabrowski (India) Rohan Bopanna	(Germany) Anna-Lena Grönefeld (Colombia) Robert Farah	2–6, 6–2, [12–10]
2018	(Chinese Taipei) Latisha Chan (Croatia) Ivan Dodig	(Canada) Gabriela Dabrowski (Croatia) Mate Pavić	6–1, 6–7^{(5–7)}, [10–8]
2019	(Chinese Taipei) Latisha Chan (2) (Croatia) Ivan Dodig (2)	(Canada) Gabriela Dabrowski (Croatia) Mate Pavić	6–1, 7–6^{(7–5)}
2020	No competition due to the COVID-19 pandemic		
2021	(United States) Desirae Krawczyk (United Kingdom) Joe Salisbury	(Russia) Elena Vesnina (Russia) Aslan Karatsev	2–6, 6–4, [10–5]
2022	(Japan) Ena Shibahara (Netherlands) Wesley Koolhof	(Norway) Ulrikke Eikeri (Belgium) Joran Vliegen	7–6^{(7–5)}, 6–2
2023	(Japan) Miyu Kato (Germany) Tim Pütz	(Canada) Bianca Andreescu (New Zealand) Michael Venus	4–6, 6–4, [10–6]
2024	(Germany) Laura Siegemund (France) Édouard Roger-Vasselin	(United States) Desirae Krawczyk (United Kingdom) Neal Skupski	6–4, 7–5
2025	(Italy) Sara Errani (Italy) Andrea Vavassori	(United States) Taylor Townsend (United States) Evan King	6–4, 6–2
2026	(Italy) Sara Errani (2) (Italy) Andrea Vavassori (2)	(Canada) Gabriela Dabrowski (United States) Evan King	4–6, 6–3, [10–4]

== Statistics ==
=== Champions by country ===
Former country

Country	Amateur Era	Open Era	All-time	First title	Last title
France (FRA)	59	11	70	1902	2024
United States (USA)	15	28	43	1930	2021
Australia (AUS)	15	9	24	1933	2011
South Africa (RSA)	9	6	15	1931	2000
Great Britain (GBR)	11	2	13	1902	2021
Czechoslovakia (TCH)	3	5	8	1948	1991
Netherlands (NED)	0	6	6	1989	2022
Spain (ESP)	0	5	5	1987	2001
India (IND)	0	5	5	1997	2017
Germany (GER)	1	3	4	1930	2024
Switzerland (SUI)	2	2	4	1935	2016
Argentina (ARG)	1	2	3	1950	1996
Mexico (MEX)	1	2	3	1959	1990
Slovenia (SLO)	0	3	3	1999	2010
Japan (JPN)	0	3	3	1997	2023
Italy (ITA)	1	2	3	1958	2025
Brazil (BRA)	1	1	2	1960	1975
Russia (RUS)	0	2	2	1993	1993
Zimbabwe (ZIM)	0	2	2	2002	2002
Czech Republic (CZE)	0	2	2	2013	2013
Chinese Taipei (TPE)	0	2	2	2018	2019
Croatia (CRO)	0	2	2	2018	2019
(Kingdom of Yugoslavia) Yugoslavia (YUG)	1	0	1	1938	1938
Luxembourg (LUX)	1	0	1	1941	1941
Chile (CHL)	1	0	1	1956	1956
Canada (CAN)	0	1	1	2017	2017
Colombia (COL)	0	1	1	1974	1974
Uruguay (URU)	0	1	1	1975	1975
Latvia (LAT)	0	1	1	1995	1995
Slovakia (SVK)	0	1	1	2005	2005
Serbia and Montenegro (SCG)	0	1	1	2006	2006
Israel (ISR)	0	1	1	2007	2007
Belarus (BLR)	0	1	1	2008	2008
Serbia (SRB)	0	1	1	2010	2010

- If the doubles partners are from the same country then that country gets two titles instead of one, while if they are from different countries then each country will get one title apiece.

== See also ==
French Open other competitions

- List of French Open men's singles champions
- List of French Open men's doubles champions
- List of French Open women's singles champions
- List of French Open women's doubles champions

Grand Slam mixed doubles

- List of Australian Open mixed doubles champions
- List of Wimbledon mixed doubles champions
- List of US Open mixed doubles champions
- List of Grand Slam mixed doubles champions
