= List of French Open women's doubles champions =

== Champions ==
Regular competition
† Not considered to be a Grand Slam event. A French club members only-tournament called the French Championships
†† Disputed champions: Not considered to be a Grand Slam event. Not sanctioned or recognised by the FFT (Note: Due to World War II, the tournaments held from 1941 to 1945 are not officially recognized by the Fédération Française de Tennis. Consequently, despite being listed by a few sources, the champions from those years are not included in the official statistics. They are listed here as a historical note.)
Further information: Tournoi de France (tennis)

=== French Championships ===
The French Championships tennis tournament began in 1891 but women's doubles didn't make an appearance until 1907. The tournament was open only to French citizens and permanent residents through 1924, but beginning in 1925, the French Championships became an international event open to all nationalities.

Year	Champions	Runners-up	Score
1907	(France) Adine Masson (France) Yvonne de Pfeffel †		
1908	(France) Kate Fenwick (France) Cecile Matthey †		
1909	(France) Jeanne Matthey (France) Daisy Speranza †		
1910	(France) Jeanne Matthey (France) Daisy Speranza †		
1911	(France) Jeanne Matthey (France) Daisy Speranza †		
1912	(France) Jeanne Matthey (France) Daisy Speranza †		
1913	(France) Blanche Amblard (France) Suzanne Amblard †		
1914	(France) Blanche Amblard (France) Suzanne Amblard †	(France) Germaine Golding (France) Suzanne Lenglen	6–4, 8–6
1915	No competition (due to World War I) (Note: The tournament was not held from 1915 to 1919 because of World War I.)		
1916	No competition (due to World War I)		
1917	No competition (due to World War I)		
1918	No competition (due to World War I)		
1919	No competition (due to World War I)		
1920	(France) Élisabeth d'Ayen (France) Suzanne Lenglen †	(France) Germaine Golding (France) Jeanne Vaussard	6–1, 6–1
1921	(France) Suzanne Lenglen (France) Geramine Pigueron †	(France) Marguerite Billout (France) Suzanne Devé	6–2, 6–1
1922	(France) Suzanne Lenglen (France) Geramine Pigueron †	(France) Marie Conquet (France) Marie Danet	6–3, 6–1
1923	(France) Suzanne Lenglen (France) Didi Vlasto †	(France) Hélène Contostavlos (France) Daisy Speranza Wyns	6–1, 6–0
1924	(France) Marguerite Billout (France) Yvonne Bourgeois †	(France) Germaine Golding (France) Jeanne Vaussard	6–3, 6–3
1925	(France) Suzanne Lenglen (France) Didi Vlasto	(United Kingdom) Evelyn Colyer (United Kingdom) Kitty McKane Godfree	6–1, 9–11, 6–2
1926	(France) Suzanne Lenglen (France) Didi Vlasto	(United Kingdom) Evelyn Colyer (United Kingdom) Kitty McKane Godfree	6–1, 6–1
1927	(South Africa) Irene Bowder Peacock (South Africa) Bobbie Heine	(United Kingdom) Peggy Saunders (United Kingdom) Phoebe Holcroft Watson	6–2, 6–1
1928	(United Kingdom) Phoebe Holcroft Watson (United Kingdom) Eileen Bennett Whittingstall	(France) Suzanne Devé (France) Sylvia Lafaurie	6–0, 6–2
1929	(Spain) Lilí de Álvarez (Netherlands) Kea Bouman	(South Africa) Bobbie Heine (South Africa) Alida Neave	7–5, 6–3
1930	(United States) Helen Wills Moody (United States) Elizabeth Ryan	(France) Simone Barbier (France) Simonne Mathieu	6–3, 6–1
1931	(United Kingdom) Eileen Bennett Whittingstall (United Kingdom) Betty Nuthall	(Germany) Cilly Aussem (United States) Elizabeth Ryan	9–7, 6–2
1932	(United States) Helen Wills Moody (United States) Elizabeth Ryan	(United Kingdom) Betty Nuthall (United Kingdom) Eileen Bennett Whittingstall	6–1, 6–3
1933	(France) Simonne Mathieu (United States) Elizabeth Ryan	(France) Sylvie Jung Henrotin (France) Colette Rosambert	6–1, 6–3
1934	(France) Simonne Mathieu (United States) Elizabeth Ryan	(United States) Helen Jacobs (United States) Sarah Palfrey	3–6, 6–4, 6–2
1935	(United Kingdom) Margaret Scriven-Vivian (United Kingdom) Kay Stammers	(France) Ida Adamoff (Germany) Hilde Krahwinkel Sperling	6–4, 6–0
1936	(France) Simonne Mathieu (United Kingdom) Billie Yorke	(United Kingdom) Susan Noel (Poland) Jadwiga Jędrzejowska	2–6, 6–4, 6–4
1937	(France) Simonne Mathieu (United Kingdom) Billie Yorke	(United States) Dorothy Andrus (France) Sylvie Jung Henrotin	3–6, 6–2, 6–2
1938	(France) Simonne Mathieu (United Kingdom) Billie Yorke	(France) Arlette Halff (France) Nelly Landry	6–3, 6–3
1939	(France) Simonne Mathieu (Poland) Jadwiga Jędrzejowska	(Kingdom of Yugoslavia) Alice Florian (Kingdom of Yugoslavia) Hella Kovac	7–5, 7–5
1940	No competition (due to World War II)		
1941	(France) Cosette St. Omer Roy _{††} (Luxembourg) Alice Weiwers	(France) Aimee Charpenal (France) Jacqueline Vivers	6–3, 6–4
1942	(France) Cosette St. Omer Roy _{††} (Luxembourg) Alice Weiwers	(France) Yvonne Kleindel (France) Paulette Melleno	6–3, 2–6, 6–2
1943	(France) Cosette St. Omer Roy _{††} (Luxembourg) Alice Weiwers	(France) Genevieve Grosbois (France) Claude Manescu	3–6, 9–7, 7–5
1944	(France) Genevieve Grosbois _{††} (France) Claude Manescu	(France) Jacqueline Marcellin (France) Henriette Morel-Deville	6–0, 2–6, 6–2
1945	(France) Paulette Fritz (France) Simone Iribarne Lafargue ^{††}	(France) Simonne Mathieu (France) Myrtil Brunnarius	6–3, 6–1
1946	(United States) Louise Brough (United States) Margaret Osborne duPont	(United States) Pauline Betz (United States) Doris Hart	6–4 0–6 6–1
1947	(United States) Louise Brough (United States) Margaret Osborne duPont	(United States) Doris Hart (United States) Patricia Canning Todd	7–5 6–2
1948	(United States) Doris Hart (United States) Patricia Canning Todd	(United States) Shirley Fry (United States) Mary Arnold Prentiss	6–4, 6–2
1949	(United States) Margaret Osborne duPont (United States) Louise Brough	(United Kingdom) Joy Gannon (United Kingdom) Betty Hilton	7–5, 6–1
1950	(United States) Doris Hart (United States) Shirley Fry	(United States) Louise Brough (United States) Margaret Osborne duPont	1–6, 7–5, 6–2
1951	(United States) Doris Hart (United States) Shirley Fry	(South Africa) Beryl Bartlett (United States) Barbara Scofield	10–8, 6–3
1952	(United States) Doris Hart (United States) Shirley Fry	(South Africa) Hazel Redick-Smith (South Africa) Julia Wipplinger	7–5, 6–1
1953	(United States) Doris Hart (United States) Shirley Fry	(United States) Maureen Connolly (United States) Julia Sampson	6–4, 6–3
1954	(United States) Maureen Connolly (Australia) Nell Hall Hopman	(France) Maud Galtier (France) Suzanne Schmitt	7–5, 4–6, 6–0
1955	(United States) Beverly Baker Fleitz (United States) Darlene Hard	(United Kingdom) Shirley Bloomer (United Kingdom) Pat Ward Hales	7–5, 6–8, 13–11
1956	(United Kingdom) Angela Buxton (United States) Althea Gibson	(United States) Darlene Hard (United States) Dorothy Head Knode	6–8, 8–6, 6–1
1957	(United Kingdom) Shirley Bloomer (United States) Darlene Hard	(Mexico) Yola Ramírez (Mexico) Rosie Reyes	7–5, 4–6, 7–5
1958	(Mexico) Rosie Reyes (Mexico) Yola Ramírez	(United States) Mary Hawton (Australia) Thelma Coyne Long	6–4, 7–5
1959	(South Africa) Sandra Reynolds (South Africa) Renée Schuurman	(Mexico) Yola Ramírez (Mexico) Rosie Reyes	2–6, 6–0, 6–1
1960	(Brazil) Maria Bueno (United States) Darlene Hard	(United Kingdom) Pat Ward Hales (United Kingdom) Ann Haydon-Jones	6–2, 7–5
1961	(South Africa) Sandra Reynolds (South Africa) Renée Schuurman	(Brazil) Maria Bueno (United States) Darlene Hard	walkover
1962	(South Africa) Sandra Reynolds (South Africa) Renée Schuurman	(United States) Justina Bricka (Australia) Margaret Smith	6–4, 6–4
1963	(United Kingdom) Ann Haydon-Jones (South Africa) Renée Schuurman	(Australia) Robyn Ebbern (Australia) Margaret Smith	7–5, 6–4
1964	(Australia) Margaret Smith (Australia) Lesley Turner	(Argentina) Norma Baylon (West Germany) Helga Schultze	6–3, 6–1
1965	(Australia) Margaret Smith (Australia) Lesley Turner	(France) Françoise Dürr (France) Janine Lieffrig	6–3, 6–1
1966	(Australia) Margaret Smith (Australia) Judy Tegart	(Australia) Jill Blackman (Australia) Fay Toyne	4–6, 6–1, 6–1
1967	(France) Françoise Dürr (France) Gail Chanfreau	(South Africa) Annette Van Zyl (South Africa) Pat Walkden	6–2, 6–2

=== French Open ===
Year	Champions	Runners-up	Score
1968	(France) Françoise Dürr (United Kingdom) Ann Haydon-Jones	(United States) Rosemary Casals (United States) Billie Jean King	7–5, 4–6, 6–4
1969	(France) Françoise Dürr (2) (United Kingdom) Ann Haydon-Jones (2)	(United States) Nancy Richey (Australia) Margaret Court	6–0, 4–6, 7–5
1970	(France) Gail Chanfreau (France) Françoise Dürr (3)	(United States) Rosemary Casals (United States) Billie Jean King	6–1, 3–6, 6–3
1971	(France) Gail Chanfreau (2) (France) Françoise Dürr (4)	(Australia) Helen Gourlay (Australia) Kerry Harris	6–4, 6–1
1972	(United States) Billie Jean King (Netherlands) Betty Stöve	(United Kingdom) Winnie Shaw (United Kingdom) Nell Truman	6–1, 6–2
1973	(Australia) Margaret Court (United Kingdom) Virginia Wade	(France) Françoise Dürr (Netherlands) Betty Stöve	6–2, 6–3
1974	(United States) Chris Evert (Soviet Union) Olga Morozova	(France) Gail Chanfreau (West Germany) Katja Ebbinghaus	6–4, 2–6, 6–1
1975	(United States) Chris Evert (2) (Czechoslovakia) Martina Navratilova	(United States) Julie Anthony (Soviet Union) Olga Morozova	6–3, 6–2
1976	(Uruguay) Fiorella Bonicelli (France) Gail Chanfreau (3)	(United States) Kathleen Harter (West Germany) Helga Niessen Masthoff	6–4, 1–6, 6–3
1977	(Czechoslovakia) Regina Maršíková (United States) Pam Teeguarden	(United States) Rayni Fox (Australia) Helen Gourlay	5–7, 6–4, 6–2
1978	(Socialist Federal Republic of Yugoslavia) Mima Jaušovec (Romania) Virginia Ruzici	(Australia) Lesley Turner (France) Gail Chanfreau	5–7, 6–4, 8–6
1979	(Netherlands) Betty Stöve (2) (Australia) Wendy Turnbull	(France) Françoise Dürr (United Kingdom) Virginia Wade	3–6, 7–5, 6–4
1980	(United States) Kathy Jordan (United States) Anne Smith	(Argentina) Ivanna Madruga (Argentina) Adriana Villagrán	6–1, 6–0
1981	(South Africa) Rosalyn Fairbank Nideffer (South Africa) Tanya Harford	(United States) Candy Reynolds (United States) Paula Smith	6–1, 6–3
1982	(United States) Martina Navratilova (2) (United States) Anne Smith (2)	(United States) Rosemary Casals (Australia) Wendy Turnbull	6–3, 6–4
1983	(South Africa) Rosalyn Fairbank Nideffer (2) (United States) Candy Reynolds	(United States) Kathy Jordan (United States) Anne Smith	5–7, 7–5, 6–2
1984	(United States) Martina Navratilova (3) (United States) Pam Shriver	(West Germany) Claudia Kohde-Kilsch (Czechoslovakia) Hana Mandlíková	5–7, 6–3, 6–2
1985	(United States) Martina Navratilova (4) (United States) Pam Shriver (2)	(West Germany) Claudia Kohde-Kilsch (Czechoslovakia) Helena Suková	4–6, 6–2, 6–2
1986	(United States) Martina Navratilova (5) (Hungary) Andrea Temesvári	(West Germany) Steffi Graf (Argentina) Gabriela Sabatini	6–1, 6–2
1987	(United States) Martina Navratilova (6) (United States) Pam Shriver (3)	(West Germany) Steffi Graf (Argentina) Gabriela Sabatini	6–2, 6–1
1988	(United States) Martina Navratilova (7) (United States) Pam Shriver (4)	(West Germany) Claudia Kohde-Kilsch (Czechoslovakia) Helena Suková	6–2, 7–5
1989	(Soviet Union) Larisa Savchenko Neiland (Soviet Union) Natalia Zvereva	(West Germany) Steffi Graf (Argentina) Gabriela Sabatini	6–4, 6–4
1990	(Czechoslovakia) Jana Novotná (Czechoslovakia) Helena Suková	(Soviet Union) Larisa Savchenko Neiland (Soviet Union) Natalia Zvereva	6–4, 7–5
1991	(United States) Gigi Fernández (Czechoslovakia) Jana Novotná (2)	(Soviet Union) Larisa Savchenko Neiland (Soviet Union) Natalia Zvereva	6–4, 6–0
1992	(United States) Gigi Fernández (2) (Commonwealth of Independent States) Natalia Zvereva (2)	(Spain) Conchita Martínez (Spain) Arantxa Sánchez Vicario	6–3, 6–2
1993	(United States) Gigi Fernández (3) (Belarus) Natalia Zvereva (3)	(Latvia) Larisa Savchenko Neiland (Czech Republic) Jana Novotná	6–3, 7–5
1994	(United States) Gigi Fernández (4) (Belarus) Natalia Zvereva (4)	(United States) Lindsay Davenport (United States) Lisa Raymond	6–2, 6–2
1995	(United States) Gigi Fernández (5) (Belarus) Natalia Zvereva (5)	(Czech Republic) Jana Novotná (Spain) Arantxa Sánchez Vicario	6–7^{(6–8)}, 6–4, 7–5
1996	(United States) Lindsay Davenport (United States) Mary Joe Fernández	(United States) Gigi Fernández (Belarus) Natalia Zvereva	6–2, 6–1
1997	(United States) Gigi Fernández (6) (Belarus) Natalia Zvereva (6)	(United States) Mary Joe Fernández (United States) Lisa Raymond	6–2, 6–3
1998	(Switzerland) Martina Hingis (Czech Republic) Jana Novotná (3)	(United States) Lindsay Davenport (Belarus) Natalia Zvereva	6–1, 7–6^{(7–4)}
1999	(United States) Serena Williams (United States) Venus Williams	(Switzerland) Martina Hingis (Russia) Anna Kournikova	6–3, 6–7^{(2–7)}, 8–6
2000	(Switzerland) Martina Hingis (2) (France) Mary Pierce	(Spain) Virginia Ruano Pascual (Argentina) Paola Suárez	6–2, 6–4
2001	(Spain) Virginia Ruano Pascual (Argentina) Paola Suárez	(Federal Republic of Yugoslavia) Jelena Dokic (Spain) Conchita Martínez	6–2, 6–1
2002	(Spain) Virginia Ruano Pascual (2) (Argentina) Paola Suárez (2)	(United States) Lisa Raymond (Australia) Rennae Stubbs	6–4, 6–2
2003	(Belgium) Kim Clijsters (Japan) Ai Sugiyama	(Spain) Virginia Ruano Pascual (Argentina) Paola Suárez	6–7^{(5–7)}, 6–2, 9–7
2004	(Spain) Virginia Ruano Pascual (3) (Argentina) Paola Suárez (3)	(Russia) Svetlana Kuznetsova (Russia) Elena Likhovtseva	6–0, 6–3
2005	(Spain) Virginia Ruano Pascual (4) (Argentina) Paola Suárez (4)	(Zimbabwe) Cara Black (South Africa) Liezel Huber	4–6, 6–3, 6–3
2006	(United States) Lisa Raymond (Australia) Samantha Stosur	(Slovakia) Daniela Hantuchová (Japan) Ai Sugiyama	6–3, 6–2
2007	(Australia) Alicia Molik (Italy) Mara Santangelo	(Slovenia) Katarina Srebotnik (Japan) Ai Sugiyama	7–6^{(7–5)}, 6–4
2008	(Spain) Anabel Medina Garrigues (Spain) Virginia Ruano Pascual (5)	(Australia) Casey Dellacqua (Italy) Francesca Schiavone	2–6, 7–5, 6–4
2009	(Spain) Anabel Medina Garrigues (2) (Spain) Virginia Ruano Pascual (6)	(Belarus) Victoria Azarenka (Russia) Elena Vesnina	6–1, 6–1
2010	(United States) Serena Williams (2) (United States) Venus Williams (2)	(Czech Republic) Květa Peschke (Slovenia) Katarina Srebotnik	6–2, 6–3
2011	(Czech Republic) Andrea Hlaváčková (Czech Republic) Lucie Hradecká	(India) Sania Mirza (Russia) Elena Vesnina	6–4, 6–3
2012	(Italy) Sara Errani (Italy) Roberta Vinci	(Russia) Maria Kirilenko (Russia) Nadia Petrova	4–6, 6–4, 6–2
2013	(Russia) Ekaterina Makarova (Russia) Elena Vesnina	(Italy) Sara Errani (Italy) Roberta Vinci	7–5, 6–2
2014	(Chinese Taipei) Hsieh Su-wei (China) Peng Shuai	(Italy) Sara Errani (Italy) Roberta Vinci	6–4, 6–1
2015	(United States) Bethanie Mattek-Sands (Czech Republic) Lucie Šafářová	(Australia) Casey Dellacqua (Kazakhstan) Yaroslava Shvedova	3–6, 6–4, 6–2
2016	(France) Caroline Garcia (France) Kristina Mladenovic	(Russia) Ekaterina Makarova (Russia) Elena Vesnina	6–3, 2–6, 6–4
2017	(United States) Bethanie Mattek-Sands (2) (Czech Republic) Lucie Šafářová (2)	(Australia) Ashleigh Barty (Australia) Casey Dellacqua	6–2, 6–1
2018	(Czech Republic) Barbora Krejčíková (Czech Republic) Kateřina Siniaková	(Japan) Eri Hozumi (Japan) Makoto Ninomiya	6–3, 6–3
2019	(Hungary) Tímea Babos (France) Kristina Mladenovic (2)	(China) Duan Yingying (China) Zheng Saisai	6–2, 6–3
2020	(Hungary) Tímea Babos (2) (France) Kristina Mladenovic (3)	(United States) Desirae Krawczyk (Chile) Alexa Guarachi	6–4, 7–5
2021	(Czech Republic) Barbora Krejčíková (2) (Czech Republic) Kateřina Siniaková (2)	(United States) Bethanie Mattek-Sands (Poland) Iga Świątek	6–4, 6–2
2022	(France) Caroline Garcia (2) (France) Kristina Mladenovic (4)	(United States) Coco Gauff (United States) Jessica Pegula	2–6, 6–3, 6–2
2023	(Chinese Taipei) Hsieh Su-wei (2) (China) Wang Xinyu	(Canada) Leylah Fernandez (United States) Taylor Townsend	1–6, 7–6^{(7–5)}, 6–1
2024	(United States) Coco Gauff (Czech Republic) Kateřina Siniaková (3)	(Italy) Sara Errani (Italy) Jasmine Paolini	7–6^{(7–5)}, 6–3
2025	(Italy) Sara Errani (2) (Italy) Jasmine Paolini	(Kazakhstan) Anna Danilina (Serbia) Aleksandra Krunić	6–4, 2–6, 6–1
2026	(Czech Republic) Kateřina Siniaková (4) (United States) Taylor Townsend	(Kazakhstan) Anna Danilina (Serbia) Aleksandra Krunić	6–2, 7–5

== Statistics ==
=== Champions by country ===
¤ Former country

Country	Amateur Era	Open Era	All-time	First title	Last title
United States (USA)	28	33	62	1930	2024
France (FRA)	45	14	59	1907	2022
Great Britain (GBR)	12	3	15	1928	1973
South Africa (RSA)	9	3	12	1927	1983
Australia (AUS)	7	4	11	1954	2007
Czech Republic (CZE)	0	10	10	1998	2024
Spain (ESP)	1	8	9	1929	2009
Czechoslovakia (TCH)	0	5	5	1975	1991
Belarus (BLR)	0	5	5	1992	1997
Italy (ITA)	0	5	5	2007	2025
Argentina (ARG)	0	4	4	2001	2005
Netherlands (NED)	1	2	3	1929	1979
Luxembourg (LUX)	3	0	3	1941	1943
Soviet Union (USSR)	0	3	3	1974	1989
Hungary (HUN)	0	3	3	1986	2020
Mexico (MEX)	2	0	2	1958	1958
Switzerland (SUI)	0	2	2	1998	2000
Russia (RUS)	0	2	2	2013	2013
China (CHN)	0	2	2	2014	2023
Chinese Taipei (TPE)	0	2	2	2014	2023
Poland (POL)	1	0	1	1939	1939
Brazil (BRA)	1	0	1	1960	1960
Uruguay (URU)	0	1	1	1976	1976
Yugoslavia (YUG)	0	1	1	1978	1978
Romania (ROU)	0	1	1	1978	1978
Belgium (BEL)	0	1	1	2003	2003
Japan (JPN)	0	1	1	2003	2003

If the doubles partners are from the same country then that country gets two titles instead of one, while if they are from different countries then each country will get one title apiece.

== See also ==
French Open other competitions

- List of French Open men's singles champions
- List of French Open men's doubles champions
- List of French Open women's singles champions
- List of French Open mixed doubles champions

Grand Slam women's doubles

- List of Australian Open women's doubles champions
- List of Wimbledon ladies' doubles champions
- List of US Open women's doubles champions
- List of Grand Slam women's doubles champions
