= 1944 in sports =

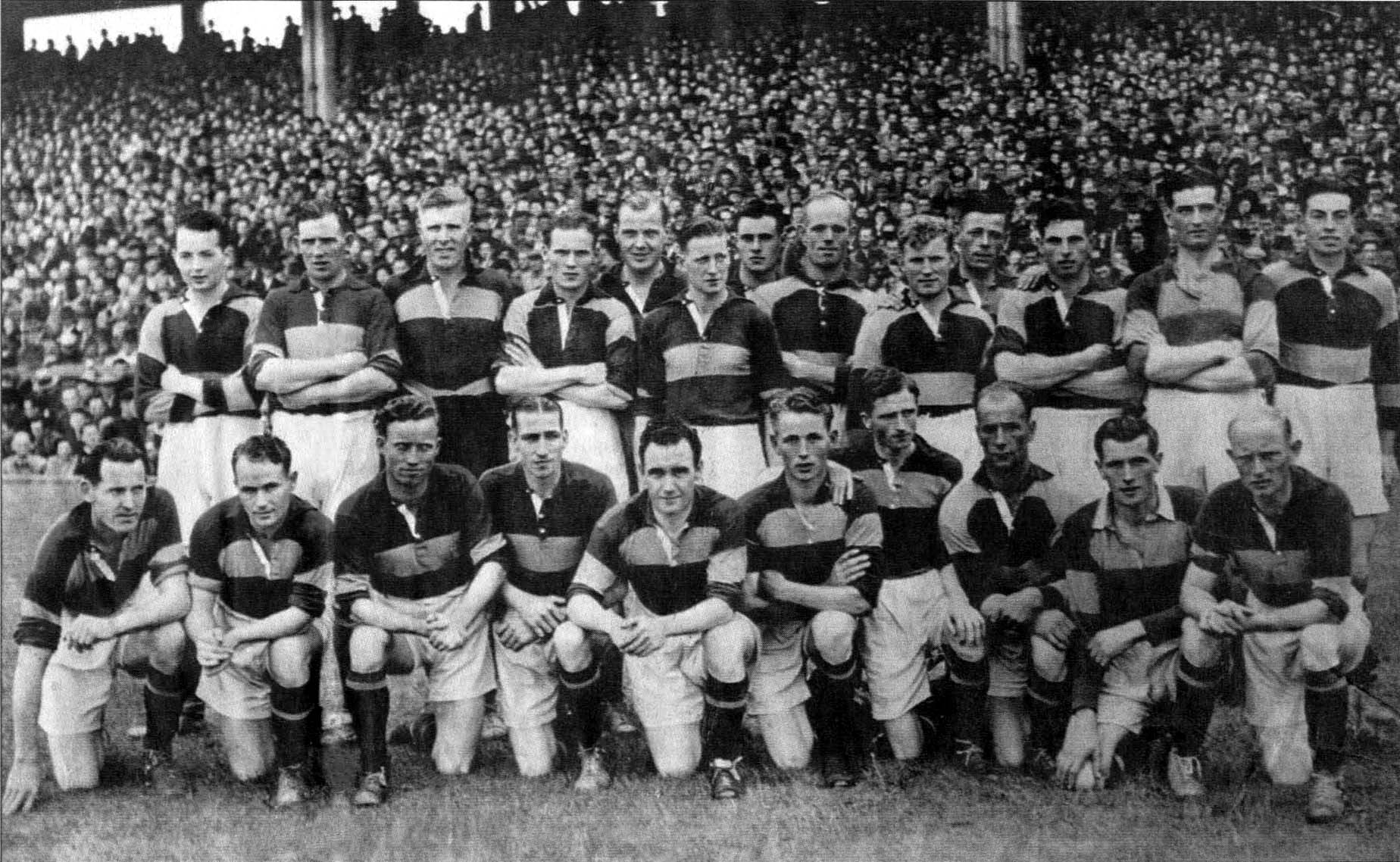
Carlow GAA football team 1944

Note — many sporting events did not take place because of World War II. The 1944 Summer Olympics was also cancelled due to WWII. It was going to be held in London, United Kingdom. For more visit 1944 Summer Olympics.

1944 in sports describes the year's events in world sport.

== American football ==
- NFL Championship: the Green Bay Packers won 14–7 over the New York Giants at the Polo Grounds
- Army Cadets – college football national championship

== Association football ==
- La Liga won by Valencia CF
- German football championship won by Dresdner SC
- Serie A – not held due to the conquest of Italy.^{[a]}
- Primeira Liga won by Sporting CP
- There is no major football competition in England, Scotland or France due to World War II. In England, several regional leagues are played but statistics from these are not counted in players’ figures.

== Australian rules football ==
- Victorian Football League
  - July 29: North Melbourne 11.21 (87) pip Richmond 14.2 (86) in the only VFL/AFL match where the winning team scored three fewer goals than the loser.
  - September 30: Fitzroy wins the 48th VFL Premiership defeating Richmond 9.12 (66) to 7.9 (51) in the Grand Final.

== Baseball ==
- May 7 – Chucho Ramos made his major league debut as first baseman and outfielder with the Cincinnati Reds. He was the third baseball player from Venezuela to play Major League Baseball.
- June 10 – 15-year-old Joe Nuxhall becomes the youngest baseball player to pitch a game in major league history.
- World Series – St. Louis Cardinals defeats St. Louis Browns, 4 games to 2.
- Negro World Series – Homestead Grays defeat Birmingham Black Barons, 4 games to 1.
- Hall of Fame election – Commissioner Kenesaw Mountain Landis is elected by the Hall of Fame Committee in December following his death the previous month. The long-delayed selection of at least 10 players from the 19th century is promised the following year.

== Basketball ==
NBL Championship

- Fort Wayne Zollner Pistons over Sheboygan Redskins (3–0)

Lithuania

- BC Žalgiris was founded in Kaunas (former part of Soviet Union).

== Boxing ==
- August 4 – the "War Bonds Fight". $36m is raised to fund the war effort as Beau Jack wins a ten-round decision over arch-rival Bob Montgomery at New York City's Madison Square Garden. A few weeks later, they were both drafted on the same day by the U.S. Army.

== Cricket ==
Events

- There is no first-class cricket in England, Australia or South Africa due to World War II. A few first-class matches are played in the West Indies and New Zealand but are not part of any official competition.

India

- Ranji Trophy – Western India beat Bengal by an innings and 23 runs.
- Bombay Pentangular – Muslims

== Cycling ==
Tour de France

- Not contested due to World War II

Giro d'Italia

- Not contested due to World War II

== Figure skating ==
World Figure Skating Championships

- Not contested due to World War II

== Golf ==
Men's professional

- Masters Tournament – not played due to World War II
- U.S. Open – not played due to World War II
- British Open – not played due to World War II
- PGA Championship – Bob Hamilton

Men's amateur

- British Amateur – not played due to World War II
- U.S. Amateur – not played due to World War II

Women's professional

- Women's Western Open – Babe Zaharias
- Titleholders Championship – not played due to World War II

== Horse racing ==
Steeplechases

- Cheltenham Gold Cup – not held due to World War II
- Grand National – not held due to World War II

Hurdle races

- Champion Hurdle – not held due to World War II

Flat races

- Australia – Melbourne Cup won by Sirius^{[b]}
- Canada – King's Plate won by Acara
- France – Prix de l'Arc de Triomphe won by Ardan^{[c]}
- Ireland – Irish Derby Stakes won by Slide On
- English Triple Crown Races:
  1. 2,000 Guineas Stakes – Garden Path
  2. The Derby – Ocean Swell
  3. St. Leger Stakes – Tehran
- United States Triple Crown Races:
  1. Kentucky Derby – Pensive
  2. Preakness Stakes – Pensive
  3. Belmont Stakes – Bounding Home

== Ice hockey ==
- Stanley Cup – Montreal Canadiens sweep the Chicago Black Hawks in four straight games.

== Motor racing ==
Events

- No major races are held anywhere worldwide due to World War II

== Olympic Games ==
1944 Winter Olympics

- The 1944 Winter Olympics, due to take place at Cortina d'Ampezzo, are cancelled due to World War II

1944 Summer Olympics

- The 1944 Summer Olympics, due to take place at London, are cancelled due to World War II

== Rowing ==
The Boat Race

- Oxford and Cambridge Boat Race is not contested due to World War II

== Rugby league ==
- 1944 New Zealand rugby league season
- 1944 NSWRFL season
- 1943–44 Northern Rugby Football League Wartime Emergency League season / 1944–45 Northern Rugby Football League Wartime Emergency League season

== Rugby union ==
- Five Nations Championship series is not contested due to World War II

== Speed skating ==
Speed Skating World Championships

- Not contested due to World War II

== Tennis ==
Australia

- Australian Men's Singles Championship – not contested
- Australian Women's Singles Championship – not contested

England

- Wimbledon Men's Singles Championship – not contested
- Wimbledon Women's Singles Championship – not contested

France

- French Men's Singles Championship – Yvon Petra (France) defeats Marcel Bernard (France) — 6–1, 4–6, 4–6, 7–5, 6–2
- French Women's Singles Championship – Raymonde Veber (France) defeats Jacqueline Patorni (France) - 6–4, 6–2

USA

- American Men's Singles Championship – Frank Parker (USA) defeats Bill Talbert (USA) 6–4, 3–6, 6–3, 6–3
- American Women's Singles Championship – Pauline Betz Addie (USA) defeats Margaret Osborne duPont (USA) 6–3, 8–6

Davis Cup

- 1944 International Lawn Tennis Challenge – not contested

== Awards ==
- Associated Press Male Athlete of the Year: Byron Nelson, PGA golf
- Associated Press Female Athlete of the Year: Ann Curtis, Swimming

== Notes ==
^{a} Ettore Rossi did organise a "Campionato Alta Italia" for teams from northern Italy, whilst in southern Italy only regional competitions followed by playoffs were held.
^{b} Owing to government bans on weekday sport, the Melbourne Cup was run on a Saturday from 1942 to 1944.
^{c} The 1944 Prix de l'Arc de Triomphe was run at Le Tremblay over 2,300 metres.
