= Aix-Les-Bains International =

Aix-Les-Bains International Tournoi International d'Aix-Les-Bains

Defunct tennis tournament
- Tour: ILTF Circuit (1913–1968)
- Founded: 1914; 112 years ago
- Abolished: 1959; 67 years ago
- Location: Aix-les-Bains, Auvergne-Rhône-Alpes, France.
- Venue: Société du Club des Sports (1913-52); Tennis Club of Aix les Bains (1953–59)
- Surface: Clay

The Aix-Les-Bains International or Tournoi International d'Aix-Les-Bains was a men's and women's international clay court tennis tournament founded in 1914. The tournament was first held at the Société du Club des Sports, Aix-les-Bains, Auvergne-Rhône-Alpes, France. It was held annually until 1959 when it was discontinued as part of the worldwide ILTF Circuit.

== History ==
1912 the Société du Club des Sports was established in Aix-les-Bains, on purchased land on Avenue Marlioz dedicated to the practice of tennis. It also rented other courts (adjoining Avenue de Marlioz). In 1913 the club founded the Aix-Les-Bains International tournament. In 1953 the Société du Club des Sports changed its name to the Tennis Club of Aix les Bains. The tournament was held annually until 1959 when it was discontinued as part of the worldwide ILTF Circuit.

== Finals ==
=== Men's singles ===
(Incomplete roll)

| Year | Winner | Runner-up | Score |
|---|---|---|---|
| 1913 | (France) Félix Poulin | (France) Philippe Wallet | 5–7, 6–1, 6–2, 5–7, 7–5 |
| 1914/1919 | Not held (due to World War I) | | |
| 1920 | (France) Henri Cochet | (United Kingdom) Norman Newton | 6–4, 3–6, 6–0, 6–0 |
| 1923 | (Switzerland) Charles Aeschlimann | (United Kingdom) Brame Hillyard | 6–2, 6–3, 8–10, 6–4 |
| 1924 | (France) Henri Cochet (2) | (Switzerland) Charles Aeschlimann | 5–7, 6–2, 6–4, 6–0 |
| 1925 | (France) Pierre Canivet | (France) Robert Champin | 6–2, 2–6, 6–3, 6–4 |
| 1926 | (Finland) Arne Grahn | (Monaco) Rene Gallepe | 6–2, 6–3, 6–1 |
| 1927 | (United Kingdom) Brame Hillyard | (United Kingdom) R.E. Soher | 6–1, 6–1 |
| 1928 | (Denmark) Erik Worm | (France) Edmond Lotan | 6–4, 6–4, 6–1 |
| 1931 | (France) Christian Boussus | (France) André Merlin | 6–3, 3–6, 6–2, 1–6, 6–2 |
| 1939/1949 | Not held (due to World War II and after) | | |
| 1957 | (Egypt) Jaroslav Drobný | (France) Paul Rémy | 6–4, 3–6, 6–0 |
| 1958 | (India) Ramanathan Krishnan | (Chile) Patricio Rodríguez | 6–3, 3–6, 6–2, 1–6, 6–2 |
| 1959 | (Egypt) Jaroslav Drobný (2) | (United Kingdom) Billy Knight | 6–3, 7–5 |

=== Women's singles ===
(Incomplete roll) Two editions of the tournament were held in 1924 one in June (*) and the other in August (**).

| Year | Winner | Runner-up | Score |
|---|---|---|---|
| 1921 | (France) Marcelle Septier | (Spain) Lili de Alvarez | 6–4, 4–6, 6–4 |
| 1922 | (France) Marcelle Septier (2) | (France) Aimée Cochet | w.o. |
| 1923 | (United Kingdom) Margery Maquay | (France) Marcelle S. Ballas | 1–6, 8–6, 6–2 |
| 1924 * | (Spain) Lili de Alvarez | (France) Cosette Saint-Omer-Roy | 6–2, 6–0 |
| 1924 ** | (France) Marguerite Broquedis | (France) Jeanne Vaussard | 6–3, 6–3 |
| 1925 | (France) Cosette Saint-Omer-Roy | (France) Marcelle S. Ballas | 6–0, 6–3 |
| 1928 | (Greece) Hélène Contostavlos | (France) Cosette Saint-Omer-Roy | 6–1, 6–4 |
| 1929 | (France) Marguerite Broquedis (2) | (France) Cosette Saint-Omer-Roy | 6–3, 6–3 |
| 1931 | (France) Aimée Charpenel | (France) Cosette Saint-Omer-Roy | 6–1, 3–6, 6–2 |
| 1934 | (France) Ida Adamoff | (France) Aimée Charpenel | 6–1. 6–1 |
| 1936 | (France) Simonne Mathieu | (Germany) Ilse Friedleben | 6–2, 6–4 |
| 1938 | (France) Aimée Charpenel (2) | (France) Marguerite Petazzi | 6–2, 6–2 |
| 1939 | (France) Aimée Charpenel (3) | (France) Denise Dijan | 6–2, 8–6 |
| 1940/1941 | Not held (due to World War II) | | |
| 1942 | (Luxembourg) Alice Weivers | (France) Aimée Cochet Charpenel | 6–1. 6–0 |
| 1943/1945 | Not held (due to World War II and after) | | |
| 1957 | (Switzerland) Ruth Kaufmann | (France) Josette Billaz | 6–1, 6–4 |
| 1958 | (Mexico) Yola Ramirez | (Belgium) Christiane Mercelis | 6–4, 7–5 |
| 1959 | (Mexico) Yola Ramirez (2) | (France) Françoise Dürr | 5–7, 6–3, 6–4 |
