= A. Péan =

French tennis player

Adrienne Péan (19 July 1875 in Paris – 31 August 1958 Saint-Julien-l'Ars) was a French tennis player from the early 20th century. She won the 1907 Open mixed doubles of the French Championships alongside Robert Wallet. In 1908, she was a runner up in the French Championships women's singles, and was defeated by Kate Gillou.
