= Réginald Forbes =

British tennis player

- Country (sports): United Kingdom
- Born: 18 November 1865
- Died: 20 February 1952 (aged 86); Dinard, France

Grand Slam mixed doubles results
- French Open: 1st (1902, 1903)

Réginald Arthur Villiers Forbes (18 November 1865 – 20 February 1952) was a British tennis player at the end of the 19th century. He won the French Open mixed doubles Championship with Yvonne Prévost in 1902 and 1903 when it was open only to French nationals or members of specific French clubs. He died in Dinard.
