= Raymonde Veber Jones =

French tennis player

Raymonde Veber
- Full name: Raymonde Veber Jones
- Country (sports): France
- Born: 1 December 1917; Paris, France
- Died: 28 June 2016 (aged 98); United States

Raymonde Veber Jones (née Veber; 1 December 1917 – 28 June 2016) was a French tennis player. In 1944 she won the singles title at the Tournoi de France, a tournament set up in Vichy France during World War II in place of the French Championships, after beating compatriot Jacqueline Patorni in the final in two sets.

Veber was born in Paris, France, on 1 December 1917 as the youngest of six children of a wealthy family. Her father ran a tire-making rubber plant. Veber grew up in Neuilly-sur-Seine and started playing tennis at age 12 after the family doctor made clear she needed to get more exercise. On 5 November 1945 she married Ray Geyer Jones, a major in the U.S. Third Army whom she had met in Cannes in September. In 1947 they moved to the United States where she lived for the rest of her life.
