= Jacqueline Patorni =

French tennis player

Jacqueline Patorni (15 May 1917– 12 March 2002) was a French tennis player. She was runner up in the 1944 Tournoi de France, losing the final in straight sets to Raymonde Veber. Patorni also reached the third round of the 1946 Wimbledon Championships – Women's Singles.

== Grand Slam finals ==
=== Mixed doubles (1 runner-up) ===
Result	Year	Championship	Surface	Partner	Opponents	Score
Loss	1954	French Championships	Clay	(Australia) Rex Hartwig	(United States) Maureen Connolly (Australia) Lew Hoad	4–6, 3–6
