= Yvonne de Pfeffel =

French tennis player

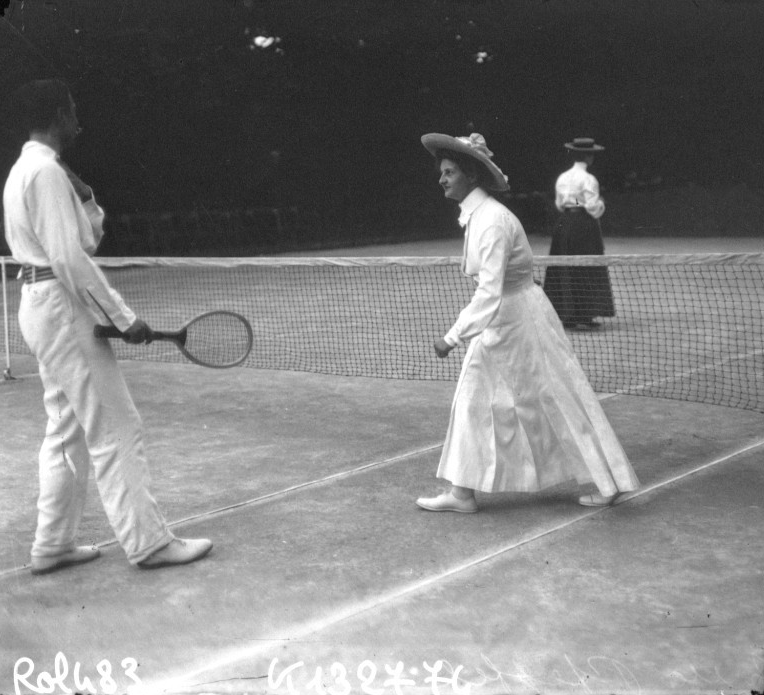
- Full name: Yvonne Marie Reneé de Pfeffel
- Country (sports): France
- Born: 30 July 1883; Paris, France
- Died: 1958; Truro, Cornwall, United Kingdom

Singles

Grand Slam singles results
- French Open: F (1905)

Doubles

Grand Slam doubles results
- French Open: W (1907)

Mixed doubles

Grand Slam mixed doubles results
- French Open: W (1905, 1906)

Yvonne de Pfeffel (30 July 1883 – 1958) was a French tennis player in the first decade of the 20th century.

== Early life and ancestry ==
De Pfeffel was born on 30 July 1883. She was the younger daughter of Baron Christian Hubert Theodor Marie Karl Pfeffel von Kriegelstein (1843–1922), son of Baron Karl Maximilian Friedrich Hubert Pfeffel von Krigenstein (1811–1890) and Karoline Adelheid Pauline von Rottenburg, natural daughter of Prince Paul of Württemberg. Her mother was Hélène Arnous de Rivière (1862–1951), daughter of French chess champion Jules Arnous de Rivière and his wife Joséphine de Coulhac Mazérieux (1834–1921). She had an elder sister, Marie-Louise Pfeffel von Kriegelstein (1882–1944) who was the great-grandmother of Boris Johnson, a former British Prime Minister.

== Tennis career ==
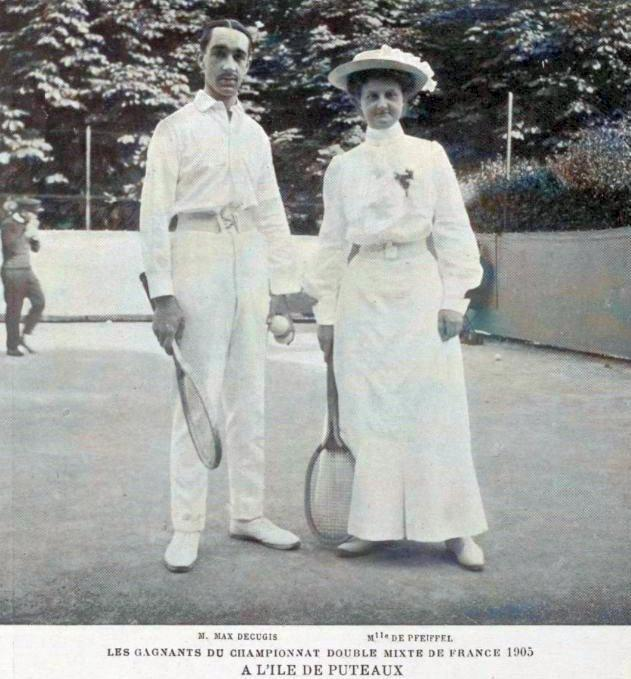
De Pfeffel with fellow French tennis player Max Decugis in 1905.

In 1907 de Pfeffel won the inaugural doubles title at the closed French Championships partnering Adine Masson. Together with Max Decugis she won the French mixed championships in 1905 and 1906. In the French singles championships she was a runner-up in 1905, losing the final in straight sets to Kate Gillou. She was a member of Tennis-Club d'Auteuil and played doubles with her sister Marie-Louise.

In February 1902 the Tennis Club de Paris organized a ping pong tournament which was won by Yvonne who defeated her sister Marie-Louise in the final.

== Death ==
De Pfeffel died in 1958 in Truro, Cornwall, United Kingdom. She was buried at St. Uny Churchyard in the village of Lelant, Cornwall, United Kingdom.
