= Daisy Speranza =

French tennis player

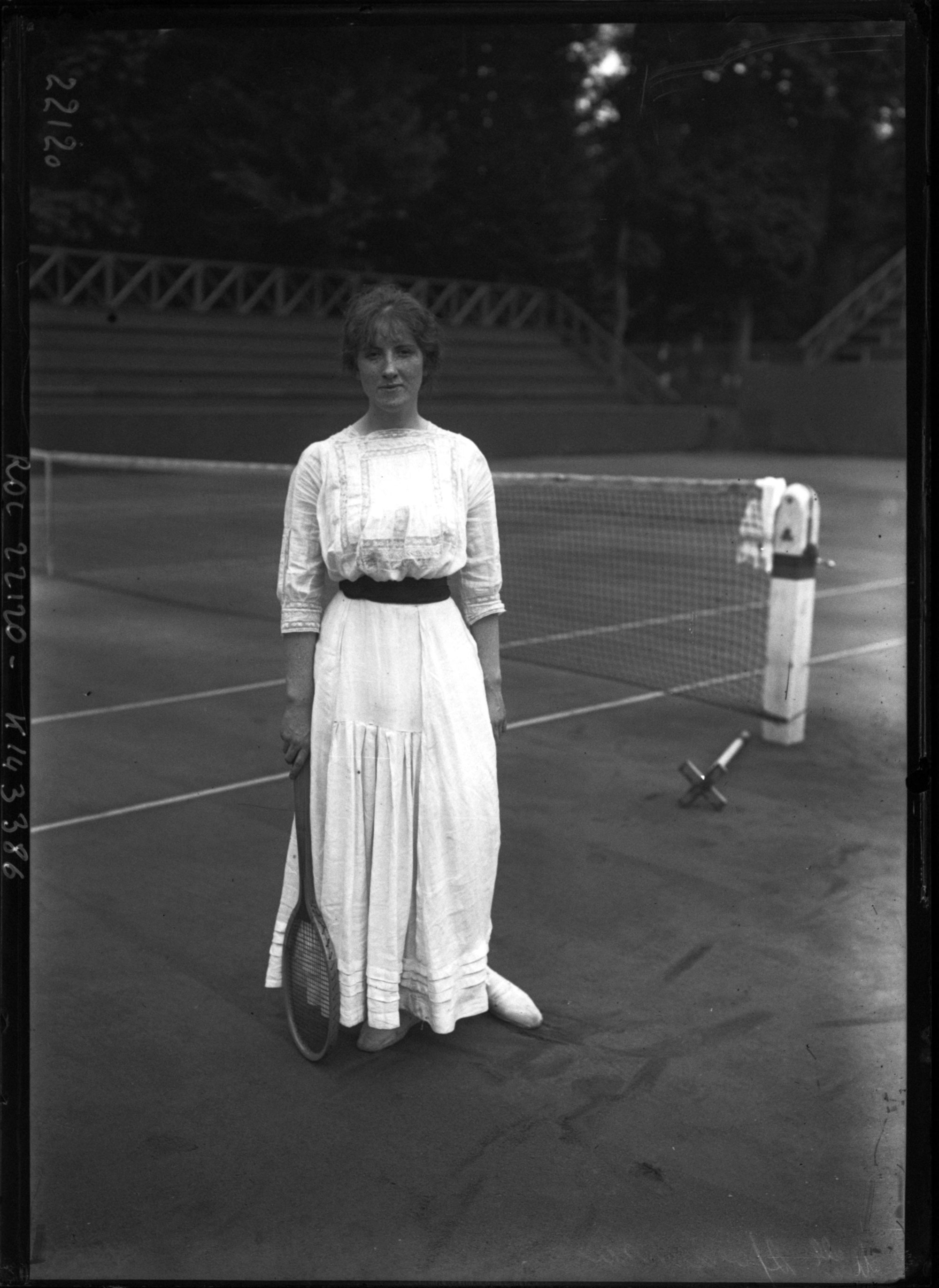
- Daisy Speranza
- Full name: Claire Marguerite Marie Louise Anne Speranza-Wyns
- Country (sports): France
- Born: 21 June 1890

Doubles

Grand Slam doubles results
- French Open: W (1909, 1910, 1911, 1912)

Mixed doubles

Grand Slam mixed doubles results
- French Open: W (1912, 1913)

Daisy Speranza was a French tennis player who won the French Championship in doubles and mixed doubles.

== Doubles and Mix doubles ==
Speranza won the French Championship in doubles four consecutive times with Jeanne Matthey from 1909 until 1912 Speranza won the French Championship in mixed doubles with William Laurentz twice.
