= Cosette Saint-Omer-Roy =

French tennis player

- Country (sports): France
- Born: 16 March 1902 Alès, France
- Died: 14 September 1985 (aged 83) Cannes, France

Grand Slam singles results
- French Open: 2R (1938)

Grand Slam doubles results
- French Open: SF (1939)
- Wimbledon: 3R (1939)

Grand Slam mixed doubles results
- French Open: 2R (1938, 1939)

Cosette Saint-Omer-Roy (last name also spelled St. Omer-Roy, born 6 March 1902, deceased 14 September 1985) was a French tennis player. With Alice Weiwers as her partner, she won the doubles' event at the Tournoi de France, a stand-in tournament in place of the French Championships during World War II. With Weiwers, she also reached the semifinals before the war at the 1939 French Championships, where they lost to the eventual champions Jadwiga Jędrzejowska and Simonne Mathieu. They also won a match together at Wimbledon in 1939. In singles, Saint-Omer-Roy entered the French Championships twice in 1938 and 1939, but did not win a match either time. Saint-Omer-Roy also served as manager of the Cannes Tennis Club from 1932.
