= Robert Wallet =

French tennis player

Robert Wallet was a tennis player competing for France.

Wallet finished runner-up to Max Decugis in the singles final of the Amateur French Championships in 1907, but took the mixed doubles title at the tournament the same year, alongside A. Péan.

== Grand Slam finals ==
=== Singles: 1 (0-1) ===
Outcome	Year	Championship	Surface	Opponent in the final	Score in the final
Runner-up	1907	French Championships	Clay (red)	(France) Max Decugis	–
