= Simone Lafargue =

French tennis player

- Full name: Simone Lafargue née Iribarne
- Country (sports): France
- Born: 6 August 1914 Bayonne, France
- Died: 4 May 2010 (aged 95) Marseille, France

Simone Lafargue (née Iribarne; 6 August 1914 – 4 May 2010) was a French tennis player. In 1943 she won the singles title at the Tournoi de France, the competition set up by the Vichy regime in place of the French Championships (later the French Open). She defeated Alice Weiwers in the final.
