= Tournoi de France (tennis) =

Tournoi de France was the unofficial French Championship tennis tournament held annually in August at Roland Garros during World War II between 1941 and 1945. Participation was limited to French competitors and local club players. After liberation, this wartime resumption of a prewar tournament that took place in the Zone occupée ceased to be recognized as being part of the annual French Championship (French Open) series. The tournament organizer, the Fédération Française de Tennis, states that the years between 1941–45 was a period when the tournament had been "cancelled".

== Finals ==
=== Men's singles ===
Year	Champion		Runner-up		Score
1941	FRA	Bernard Destremau	FRA	Robert Ramillon	6–4, 2–6, 6–3, 6–4
1942	FRA	Bernard Destremau	FRA	Christian Boussus	5–7, 6–4, 6–4, 6–1
1943	FRA	Yvon Petra	FRA	Henri Cochet	6–3, 6–3, 6–8, 2–6, 6–4
1944	FRA	Yvon Petra	FRA	Marcel Bernard	6–1, 4–6, 4–6, 7–5, 6–2
1945	FRA	Yvon Petra	FRA	Bernard Destremau	7–5, 6–4, 6–2

=== Women's singles ===
Year	Champion		Runner-up		Score
1941	LUX	Alice Weiwers	FRA	Anne-Marie Seghers	6–0, 6–2
1942	LUX	Alice Weiwers	FRA	Lolette Dodille-Payot	6–4, 6–4
1943	FRA	Simone Iribarne Lafargue	LUX	Alice Weiwers	6–1, 7–5
1944	FRA	Raymonde Veber	FRA	Jacqueline Patorni	6–4, 6–2
1945	FRA	Lolette Dodille-Payot	FRA	Simone Iribarne Lafargue	6–3, 6–4

=== Men's doubles ===
Year	Champions	Runners-up	Score
1941	(France) Christian Boussus (France) Bernard Destremau	(France) Robert Ramillon (France) Georges Zafiri	7–5, 6–3, 5–7, 6–4
1942	(France) Bernard Destremau (France) Yvon Petra	(France) Henri Cochet (France) Paul Féret	6–3, 6–4, 10–8
1943	(France) Marcel Bernard (France) Yvon Petra	(France) Christian Boussus (France) Henri Cochet	6–3, 7–5, 5–7, 6–4
1944	(France) Marcel Bernard (France) Yvon Petra	(France) Henri Bolelli (France) Henri Pellizza	6–1, 1–6, 6–3, 6–2
1945	(France) Henri Cochet (France) Pierre Pellizza	(France) Bernard Destremau (France) Yvon Petra	2–6, 6–4, 8–6, 3–6, 6–0

=== Women's doubles ===
Year	Champions	Runners-up	Score
1941	(France) Cosette St. Omer Roy (Luxembourg) Alice Weiwers	(France) Aimée Charpenel-Cochet (France) Jacqueline Vivès	6–3, 6–4
1942	(France) Cosette St. Omer Roy (Luxembourg) Alice Weiwers	(France) Yvonne Kleinadel (France) Paulette Mellerio	6–3, 2–6, 6–2
1943	(France) Cosette St. Omer Roy (Luxembourg) Alice Weiwers	(France) Genevieve Grosbois (France) Claude Manescau	3–6, 9–7, 7–5
1944	(France) Genevieve Grosbois (France) Claude Manescau	(France) Jacqueline Marcellin (France) Henriette Morel-Deville	6–0, 2–6, 6–2
1945	(France) Paulette Fritz (France) Simone Iribarne Lafargue	(France) Simonne Mathieu (France) Myrtil Brunnarius	6–3, 6–1

=== Mixed doubles ===
Year	Champions	Runners-up	Score
1941	(Luxembourg) Alice Weiwers (France) Robert Abdesselam	(France) Suzanne Pannetier (France) Roger Dessair	6–2, 6–4
1942	(France) Simone Iribarne Lafargue (France) Henri Pellizza	(Luxembourg) Alice Weiwers (France) Robert Abdesselam	6–0, 6–2
1943	(Luxembourg) Alice Weiwers (France) Henri Pellizza	(France) Simone Iribarne Lafargue (France) Georges Grémillet	6–3, 6–1
1944	(France) Suzanne Pannetier (France) Antoine Gentien	(France) Jacqueline Patorni (France) Paul Féret	6–3, 7–5
1945	(France) Lolette Dodille-Payot (France) André Jacquemet	(France) Anne-Marie Seghers (France) Roger Dubuc	4–6, 6–1, 6–1

== See also ==
- List of French Open men's singles champions
- List of French Open women's singles champions
