= Jeanne Matthey =

French tennis player (1886–1980)

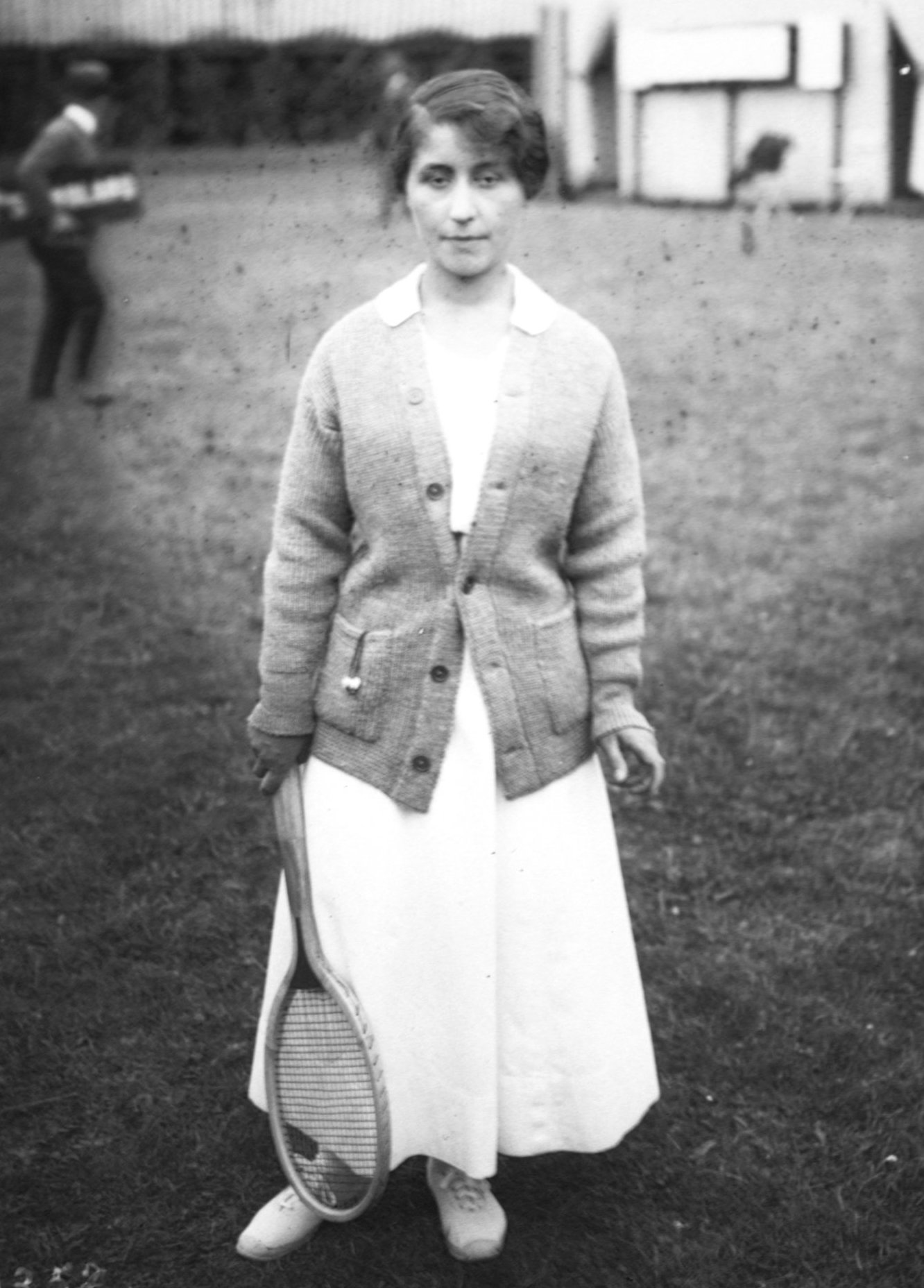
- Matthey in 1914
- Country (sports): France
- Born: 25 January 1886; Alexandria, Egypt
- Died: 24 November 1980 (aged 94); Paris, France

Singles

Grand Slam singles results
- French Open: W (1909, 1910, 1911, 1912)

Doubles

Grand Slam doubles results
- French Open: W (1909, 1910, 1911, 1912)

Mixed doubles

Grand Slam mixed doubles results
- French Open: W (1909)

Jeanne-Marie Matthey-Jonais (25 January 1886 – 24 November 1980) was a French tennis player. She competed during the first two decades of the 20th century. Matthey won the French Open Women's Singles Championship four times in succession from 1909 to 1912, but lost the 1913 final to Marguerite Broquedis.

Matthey was born in Alexandria, Egypt to a Swiss father and a French mother. The family moved to Paris, France in 1900 where she started playing tennis at the Racing Club de France.

In July 1913 she won the singles events at the tournaments of Chantilly and Compiègne. At Chantilly she defeated 14 year old-Suzanne Lenglen in the semifinal and Kate Gillou-Fenwick in the final. At Compiègne later that month she had a walk-over in the final against Lenglen. In October 1913 she won the singles title at the Paris Covered Court Championships, played at the Sporting Club de Paris, after a three-set victory in the final against Broquedis.

In World War I she served as a Red Cross nurse. As she was serving on front she was seriously wounded several times. Because of the wounds to her right arm she gave up playing tennis. In 1972 when she attended Roland Garros she jokingly said that she consisted of many pieces because of her war wounds.

In 1927 she received the bronze Medal of Honour for public assistance (médaille d'honneur de l'assistance publique) for her services as a nurse. In 1952 she was named a knight in the Legion of Honour, in 1958 she became an officer and in 1962 she was promoted to the rank of commander.

During World War II she was active in the resistance, tasked with relaying messages, and after being arrested and tortured by the Gestapo was interned in German concentration camps in 1945.
