= French Tennis Federation =

Governing body for tennis in France

- Sport: Tennis
- Abbreviation: FFT
- Founded: 1920
- Affiliation: World Tennis
- Regional affiliation: Europe (TE)
- Headquarters: Roland Garros stadium, Paris
- President: Gilles Moretton

Official website
- fft.fr
- (France)

The French Tennis Federation (French: Fédération française de tennis, FFT) is the governing body for tennis in France. It was founded in 1920, and is tasked with the organisation, co-ordination and promotion of the sport. It is recognised by the International Tennis Federation and by the French Minister for Sports. Its headquarters are at the Roland Garros stadium. It was founded under the name Fédération Française de Lawn Tennis until it changed to the Fédération Française de Tennis in 1976. The roles of the FFT include organising tennis competitions in France, most notably the French Open, supporting and co-ordinating tennis clubs, and managing the French tennis teams, including their Davis Cup and Billie Jean King Cup teams.

== History ==
Logo of FFT (1992–2015)
