= Kate Gillou =

French tennis player (1887–1964)

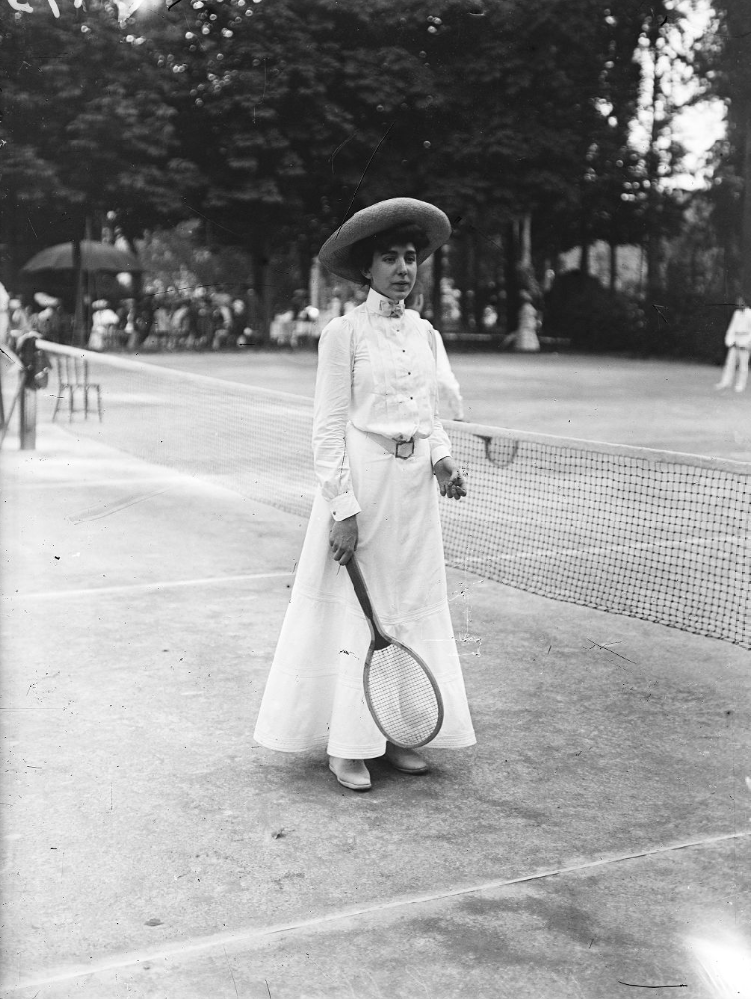
- Country (sports): France
- Born: 17 February 1887 Paris, France
- Died: 1 January 1964 (aged 76) Paris, France

Catherine Marie Blanche "Katie" Gillou (17 February 1887 – 1 January 1964) was a French tennis player in the first decade of the 20th century.

Gillou won the French Women's Singles Championship in each of 1904, 1905, 1906 and 1908, having lost in the 1903 final to Adine Masson.

Gillou's victories in 1906 and 1908 were achieved under her married name of Kate Gillou-Fenwick.

It was thought that she competed in the mixed doubles event at the 1900 Summer Olympics with Pierre Verdé-Delisle, but it was her sister Antoinette Gillou who competed at the Olympics.
