= Alice Weiwers =

Luxembourgish tennis player

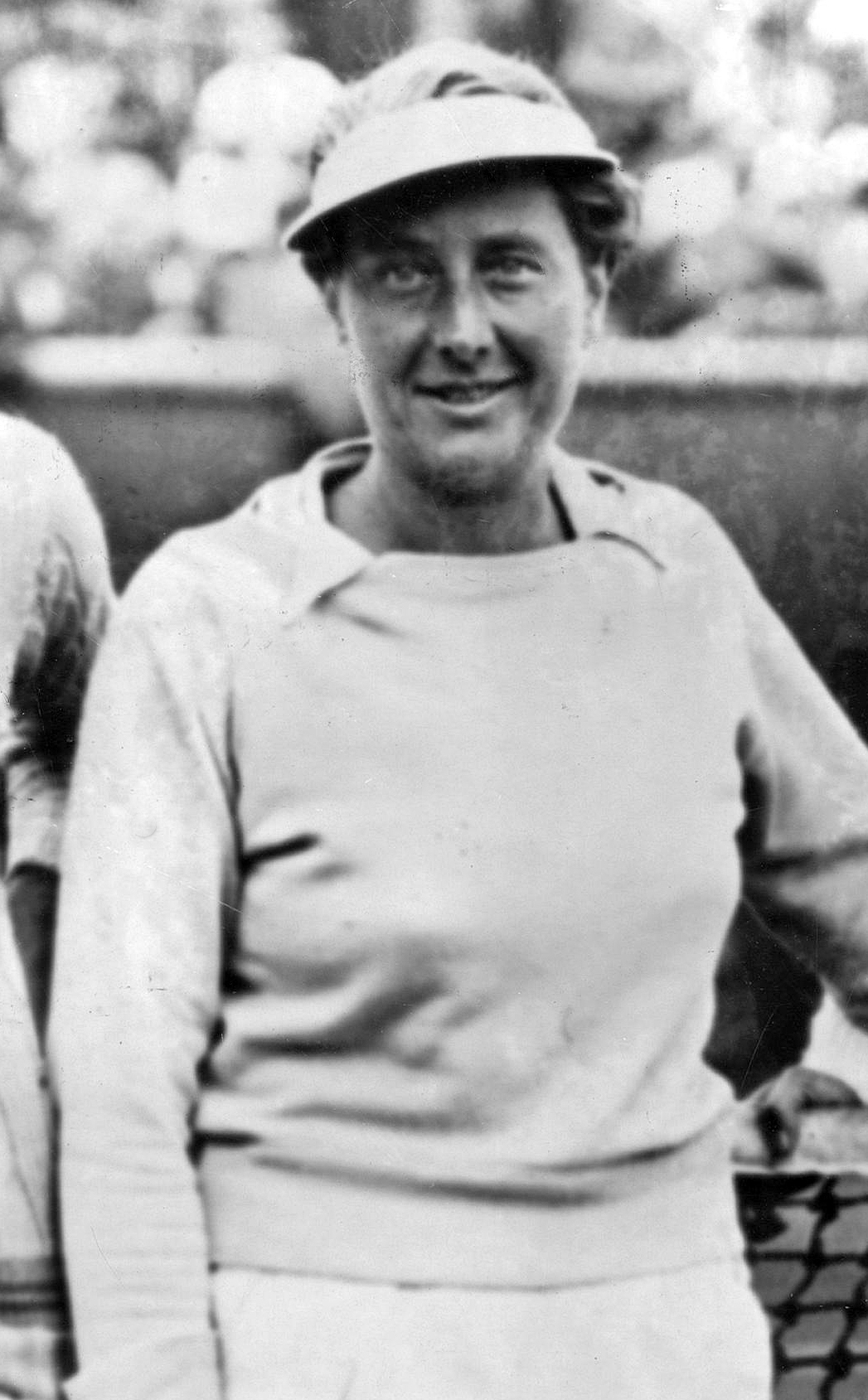
- Country (sports): Luxembourg

Grand Slam singles results
- French Open: QF (1939, 1946)
- Wimbledon: 3R (1947, 1948)

Grand Slam doubles results
- French Open: SF (1939)
- Wimbledon: 3R (1939)

Alice Weiwers was a tennis player from Luxembourg. Weiwers won 4 titles at the Tournoi de France, the French Championship tournament held in Vichy France. She won the 1941 and 1942 singles, 1941 doubles, and 1941 mixed doubles titles.

== See also ==
- List of French Open women's singles champions
