= 1891 in sports =

1891 in sports describes the year's events in world sport.

== Athletics ==
- USA Outdoor Track and Field Championships

== American football ==
College championship

- College football national championship – Yale Bulldogs

Events

- Kansas defeats Missouri in the first Border War game 22-10 beginning one of the oldest and most fierce college football rivalries.

== Association football ==
Argentina

- Argentine Primera Division founded

Belgium

- Club Brugge KV founded

England

- The Football League – Everton 29 points, Preston North End 27, Notts County 26, Wolves 26, Bolton Wanderers 25, Blackburn Rovers 24
- FA Cup final – Blackburn Rovers 3–1 Notts County at The Oval
- The Football League expands from twelve to fourteen teams for the 1891–92 season: Stoke FC, having been expelled in 1890, is restored; Darwen is elected.

Scotland

- The Scottish Football League's inaugural season is completed with a shared title
- Scottish Football League – Dumbarton and Rangers: title shared
- Scottish Cup final – Heart of Midlothian 1–0 Dumbarton at Hampden Park

Uruguay

- 28 September — foundation of the Central Uruguay Railway Cricket Club (CURCC) by British railway workers in Montevideo; it later becomes C.A. Peñarol

== Australian Rules Football ==
- Victorian Football Association premiers - Essendon
- SANFL premiers - Norwood
- WAFL premiers - Rovers

== Baseball ==
National championship

- National League v. American Association – series not held
- The National League winners are the Boston Beaneaters who decline to play against the American Association winners, the Boston Reds

Events

- The American Association folds after the season ends

== Basketball ==
Events

- James Naismith of Springfield, Massachusetts invents basketball

== Boxing ==
Events

- 14 January — Bob Fitzsimmons knocks out Jack Nonpareil Dempsey in the 13th round at New Orleans to win the Middleweight Championship of the World. It is the first of three world titles that Fitzsimmons will hold during his career.

Lineal world champions

- World Heavyweight Championship – John L. Sullivan
- World Middleweight Championship – Jack Nonpareil Dempsey → Bob Fitzsimmons
- World Welterweight Championship – title vacant
- World Lightweight Championship – Jack McAuliffe
- World Featherweight Championship – Young Griffo

== Canadian Football ==
- The Canadian Rugby Union (CRU) is formed as the new governing body of the sport. It lasts until the birth of the CFL in 1958.
- McGill defeats Bishop's College 38–8 in an exhibition match in Montreal.
- Quebec Rugby Football Union champions - Montreal.
- Ontario Rugby Football Union champions - Osgoode Hall.
- Northwest Championship - Moosomin.
- Dominion Championship - Osgoode Hall defeats Montreal 21–10.

== Cricket ==
Events

- Inaugural Inter-Colonial Tournament takes place in the West Indies involving Barbados, British Guiana and Trinidad & Tobago.

England

- County Championship – Surrey
- Most runs – William Gunn 1336 @ 41.75 (HS 169)
- Most wickets – George Lohmann 177 @ 11.66 (BB 7–20)
- Wisden Five Great Bowlers – William Attewell, J T Hearne, Frederick Martin, Arthur Mold, John Sharpe

Australia

- Most runs – George Giffen 275 runs @ 91.66 (HS 237)
- Most wickets – Jim Phillips 25 wickets @ 10.00 (BB 7–20)

South Africa

- Currie Cup – Kimberley

West Indies

- Inter-Colonial Tournament – Barbados

== Golf ==
Major tournaments

- British Open – Hugh Kirkaldy

Other tournaments

- British Amateur – Johnny Laidlay

== Horse racing ==
England

- Grand National – Come Away
- 1,000 Guineas Stakes – Mimi
- 2,000 Guineas Stakes – Common
- The Derby – Common
- The Oaks – Mimi
- St. Leger Stakes – Common

Australia

- Melbourne Cup – Malvolio

Canada

- Queen's Plate – Victorious

Ireland

- Irish Grand National – Old Tom
- Irish Derby Stakes – Narraghmore

USA

- Kentucky Derby – Kingman
- Preakness Stakes – not run
- Belmont Stakes – Foxford

== Ice hockey ==
Events

- 5 March — the Montreal Hockey Club defeats the Montreal Crescents 8–2 in a challenge to retain the 1891 AHAC season title.
- 7 March — the Ottawa Hockey Club defeats the Toronto St. George's 5–0 to win the inaugural Ontario Hockey Association championship.

Sweden

- Djurgårdens IF Hockey was founded in Stockholm

== Rowing ==
The Boat Race

- 21 March — Oxford wins the 48th Oxford and Cambridge Boat Race

== Rugby football ==
Home Nations Championship

- The 9th series is won by Scotland with a 100% record against England, Ireland and Wales.

Other events

- The 1891 British Lions tour to South Africa is the first British Isles tour of South Africa and only the second overseas tour conducted by a joint British team. Between 9 July and 7 September, the team plays 20 games, including three Tests against the South Africa national rugby union team. The British Isles wins all 20 matches including the three Tests. Although not named as such at the time, the tour is retrospectively recognised as a British Lions tour.

== Tennis ==
Events

- Inaugural French championship is held as the Championat de France International de Tennis. Initially, only the men's singles is contested; the women's singles will begin in 1897. Until 1924, the tournament is open only to tennis players who are licensed in France but, ironically, the inaugural tournament is won by an Englishman, H Briggs, who defeats French player P Baigneres in the final. Briggs is a British resident living in Paris.

England

- Wimbledon Men's Singles Championship – Wilfred Baddeley (GB) defeats Joshua Pim (Ireland) 6–4 1–6 7–5 6–0
- Wimbledon Women's Singles Championship – Lottie Dod (GB) defeats Blanche Bingley Hillyard (GB) 6–2 6–1

France

- French Men's Singles Championship – H. Briggs (GB) defeats P. Baigneres (France) 6–3 6–2

USA

- American Men's Singles Championship – Oliver Campbell (USA) defeats Clarence Hobart (USA) 2–6 7–5 7–9 6–1 6–2
- American Women's Singles Championship – Mabel Cahill (GB) defeats Ellen Roosevelt (USA) 6–4 6–1 4–6 6–3
