= Pantaloon (horse) =

British Thoroughbred racehorse

- Sire: Castrel
- Grandsire: Buzzard
- Dam: Idalia
- Damsire: Peruvian
- Sex: Stallion
- Foaled: 1824
- Country: Great Britain
- Colour: Chestnut
- Breeder: Lord Grosvenor
- Record: 7: 6-0-0

Pantaloon (1824 - 1850) was a British Thoroughbred racehorse and sire. He was undefeated at age three (with one disqualification) and continued a sire line of the Byerley Turk which persisted to the 20th century.

== Background ==
Pantaloon was a bred by Lord Grosvenor and foaled in 1824. He was said to have been marked with black spots.

== Racing career ==
He raced only as a three-year old. He was unbeaten in all seven of his starts. However, he was disqualified in his last start. His races were at country venues against smaller fields of horse competition.

== Stud career ==
Notable Offspring:

- Cardinal Puff (b. 1834): winner of the Chester Cup
- Sleight of Hand (b. 1836): winner of the Liverpool Cup
- Ghuznee (b. 1838): winner of the Oaks and Coronation Stakes
- Satirist (b. 1838): winner of the St Leger Stakes, Queen's Vase, St James Palace Stakes, and Queen Ann Stakes
- Pantaloon mare (b. 1841): useful mare, dam of Leamington, important sire in the United States
- The Libel (b. 1842): winner of the Queen Ann Stakes
- Jacose (b. 1843): useful mare, dam of Macaroni
- Slander (b. 1844): winner of the Norfolk Stakes
- Clarissa (b. 1846): winner of the Nassau Stakes
- Legerdemain (b. 1846): winner of the Cesarewitch Handicap and Manchester Cup
- Officious (b. 1847): winner of the Queen Ann Stakes
- Windhound (b. 1847): useful stallion, sire of Thormanby
- Hernandez (b. 1848): winner of the 2000 Guineas Stakes
- Hobbie Noble (b. 1849): winner of the July Stakes and Norfolk Stakes; full brother of Windhound
- The Reaver (b. 1850): winner of the July Stakes and St James Palace Stakes

== Sire line tree ==
- Pantaloon
  - Cardinal Puff
  - Drone
  - Sir Ralph
  - Auctioneer
  - Sleight of Hand
    - Sleight of Hand Jr
    - Sir Tatton
      - Duke
      - Odd Trick
  - The Lord Mayor
  - Morpeth
  - Satirist
    - No Joke
    - The Black Prince
  - Van Amburgh
  - The Libel
    - Traducer
      - Scandal
      - Detractor
      - Castaway
        - Castoff
        - Salvage
      - Slanderer
        - Grip
      - Templeton
      - Fishhook
      - Danebury
      - Chancellor
      - Foul Play
      - Foul Shot
      - Le Loup
        - Gipsy King
        - Wolverine
      - Trump Card
      - Natator
        - Captain Webb
        - Moifaa
      - Adamant
      - Betrayer
        - Liberator
      - Libeller
      - Piscatorius
      - Sir Modred
        - Antaeus
        - Sir William
        - Sir John
        - Tournament
        - Dr Hasbrouck
        - Shellbark
        - Comanche
        - Uncle Jess
        - Rio Bravo
        - Sir Excess
        - Connoisseur
        - Premier
        - Bendoran
        - Pupil
        - Kenilworth
        - Sir Brillar
      - Idalium
      - Somnus
        - The Artist
      - The Dauphin
      - Cheviot
        - Rey El Santa Anita
      - Vanguard
        - Skirmisher
        - Advance
        - Convoy
      - Welcome Jack
        - Bob Ray
      - July
    - The Lawyer
      - The Solicitor
      - Woodbrook
      - Lord Chancellor
  - Warrior
  - Elthiron
    - Beauvais
  - Windhound
    - Defender
    - Thormanby
      - Plaudit
        - Balfe
      - Cap-A-Pie
      - John Bull
      - Sunstroke
      - Glengarry
        - Harry Glenn
        - Stuyvesant
        - Kingman
      - Thorwaldsen
      - Albany
        - Burlington
        - Oudeis
        - Disowned
      - Barford
      - Normanby
      - By The Sea
        - Genoves
      - Merry Sunshine
      - Atlantic
        - Pacific
        - Le Sancy
        - Fitz Roya
        - Le Capricorne
        - Fousi-Yama
        - Ravioli
        - Cherbourg
      - Rostrevor
        - Ilex
      - Thuringian Prince
      - Tomahawk
      - Charibert
        - Help
        - Workington
        - The Lover
        - Csaplaros
        - Hagen
    - Rivet
    - Windham
    - Duke of York
    - Staghound
  - Hernandez
    - Huntingdon
  - Hobbie Noble
    - Merryman
    - Kangaroo
  - The Reiver

== Pedigree ==
Pedigree of Pantaloon, chestnut stallion, 1824
Sire Castrel 1801	Buzzard; 1787	Woodpecker; 1773	Herod*^
Sire Castrel 1801	Buzzard; 1787	Woodpecker; 1773	Miss Ramsden
Sire Castrel 1801	Buzzard; 1787	Misfortune; 1775	Dux
Sire Castrel 1801	Buzzard; 1787	Misfortune; 1775	Curiosity
Sire Castrel 1801	Alexander mare 1790	Alexander; 1782	Eclipse*
Sire Castrel 1801	Alexander mare 1790	Alexander; 1782	Grecian Princess
Sire Castrel 1801	Alexander mare 1790	Highflyer mare 1780	Highflyer*^
Sire Castrel 1801	Alexander mare 1790	Highflyer mare 1780	Alfred mare
Dam Idalia 1815	Peruvian; 1806	Sir Peter Teazle; 1784	Highflyer*^
Dam Idalia 1815	Peruvian; 1806	Sir Peter Teazle; 1784	Papillon
Dam Idalia 1815	Peruvian; 1806	Boudrow mare 1788	Boudrow
Dam Idalia 1815	Peruvian; 1806	Boudrow mare 1788	Squirrel mare
Dam Idalia 1815	Musidora; 1804	Meteor; 1783	Eclipse*
Dam Idalia 1815	Musidora; 1804	Meteor; 1783	Merlin mare
Dam Idalia 1815	Musidora; 1804	Maid of all Work; 1786	Highflyer*^
Dam Idalia 1815	Musidora; 1804	Maid of all Work; 1786	Syphon mare

*^ Pantaloon is inbred 4S x 5S x 5D x 5D to the stallion Herod, meaning that he appears fourth generation once and fifth generation once (via Highflyer)^ on the sire side of his pedigree and fifth generation twice (via Highflyer)^ on the dam side of his pedigree.

* Pantaloon is inbred 4S x 4D to the stallion Eclipse, meaning that he appears fourth generation on the sire side of his pedigree and fourth generation on the dam side of his pedigree.
