= Atlantic (horse) =

British-bred Thoroughbred racehorse

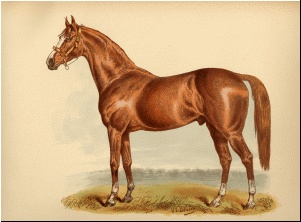
- Atlantic, contemporary painting
- Sire: Thormanby
- Grandsire: Windhound
- Dam: Hurricane
- Damsire: Wild Dayrell
- Sex: Stallion
- Foaled: 1871
- Died: 1891 (aged 19–20)
- Country: United Kingdom
- Colour: Chestnut
- Breeder: Evelyn Boscawen, 6th Viscount Falmouth
- Owner: Lord Falmouth
- Trainer: Mathew Dawson
- Record: 12:6-3-1

Major wins
- 2000 Guineas (1874); Ascot Derby (1874)

Atlantic (1871–1891) was a British Thoroughbred racehorse and sire. In a career that lasted from July 1873 to September 1874 he ran twelve times and won six races. After a promising, but unremarkable two-year-old season in 1873 he improved to become one of the best British colts of his generation, winning the 2000 Guineas and finishing third in The Derby. His success was achieved despite his racing career being adversely affected by his tendency to break blood vessels in his races. Atlantic was the first Classic winner ridden by Fred Archer. After his retirement, Atlantic was exported to France, where he became a successful and influential sire of winners.

== Background ==
Atlantic was a "lightly-framed" chestnut horse with a "mean" temperament, bred by his owner, Evelyn Boscawen, 6th Viscount Falmouth. He was sired by the 1860 Derby winner Thormanby, a direct descendant of the Byerley Turk, out of the mare Hurricane, who had won the 1000 Guineas for Lord Falmouth in 1862. Falmouth sent the colt into training with Mathew Dawson at Heath House stables in Newmarket, Suffolk.

== Racing career ==
=== 1873: two-year-old season ===
Atlantic began his career at Goodwood in July when he contested the Ham Produce Stakes. He won easily by three lengths from the future Grand National winner Regal with the filly Apology who went on to win the Fillies' Triple Crown in third place. In August Atlantic finished second in the Convivial Produce Stakes at York, beaten a head by Tipster.

After a two-month break, Atlantic returned for the autumn meetings at Newmarket. He was able to claim prize money of £300 without having to race when he walked over for the Buckenham Stakes at the First October meeting, but then finished unplaced behind Feu d'Amour in the Prendergast Stakes. On his final appearance, Atlantic was beaten a short head by Minister in the Glasgow Stakes. Atlantic's performances established him as a colt of some ability, but he appeared to be some way below the best of his generation and was not considered to be one of the major contenders for the following year's Classics.

=== 1874: three-year-old season ===
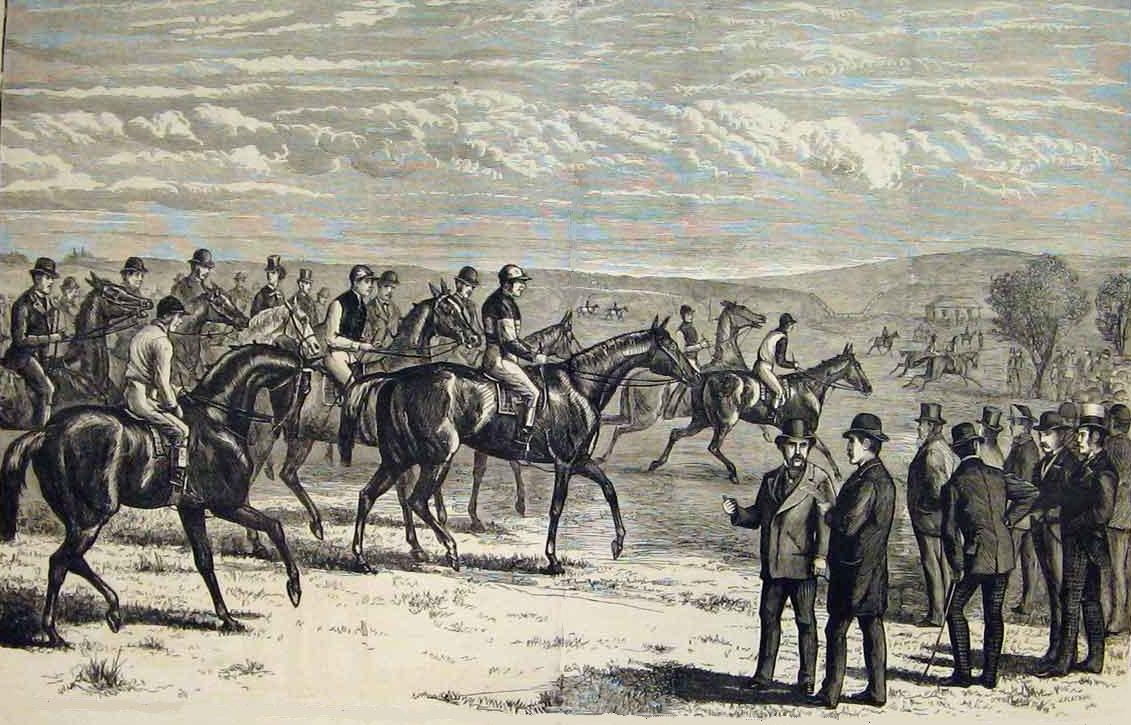
Engraving of the 1874 2,000 Guineas, from the Illustrated Sporting and Dramatic News, May 1874

Atlantic began his three-year-old season at the Newmarket Craven meeting in April, where he claimed two more prizes without racing when he was allowed to walk over in two Sweepstakes. On 6 May, Atlantic contested the 2000 Guineas, and started at odds of 10/1 in a field of twelve, with Ecossais being made favourite at 5/4. Ridden by the seventeen-year-old Fred Archer, Atlantic disputed the lead from the start and with two furlongs to travel only Reverberation and Ecossais remained as challengers. The favourite was the first of the three to weaken and after "a most exciting set-to" Atlantic prevailed by a neck from the fast-finishing Reverberation with Ecossais third and the rest of the field well beaten. Atlantic's victory was the first of Archer's twenty-one Classic winners.

Atlantic was one of the leading fancies for the Derby at Epsom despite being regarded as inferior to his trainer's other runner, Aquilo. His cause was not helped when he sustained a knee injury when being loaded onto the train which was to take him from Newmarket to Epsom. In the race Atlantic was settled behind the leaders, but although he made progress in the straight he was unable to reach the front and finished third, beaten two lengths and a neck by George Frederick and Couronne de Fer. It was later reported that he had broken a blood vessel during the race. Following his run in the Derby, Atlantic was sent to Royal Ascot where he ran twice. On the first day of the meeting he finished second to Leotinus, who was carrying twelve pounds less, in the Prince of Wales's Stakes over thirteen furlongs. On the following day he reappeared in the Ascot Derby, the race now known as the King Edward VII Stakes and won from Clairvoyant and The Pique.

On his only other racecourse appearance, Atlantic ran in the St Leger at Doncaster in September. He seemed to be unsettled before the race, being described as "most difficult to stop" after a false start. In the race he appeared to be travelling well in third place but at the mile post he began to struggle and dropped back to last place after again rupturing a blood vessel. He completed the course but never ran again.

== Stud career ==
At the end of 1874, Atlantic was sold to Baron Arthur de Schickler and exported to France where he was based at his new owner's Chateau Martinvast stud, near Cherbourg. Atlantic sired many notable winners including Fitz Roya (Grand Prix de Paris), Fousi-Yama (Prix du Cadran), Le Capricorn (Grosser Preis von Baden) and Pietra Mala (Richmond Stakes, Gimcrack Stakes, Champagne Stakes). His most important offspring was Le Sancy, who won nineteen consecutive races between 1889 and 1890 and was the paternal great-grandsire of The Tetrarch. Atlantic died at the Martinvast stud in 1891.

== Sire line tree ==
- Atlantic
  - Pacific
  - Le Sancy
    - Le Hadji
    - Le Justicier
    - Le Sagittaire
      - Maintenon
        - Manfred
        - Montrose
        - Petulance
        - Diderot
        - Dorrit
        - Crimper
        - Maintenant
        - Brumado
        - Cortland
        - Phusla
        - Brumaire
        - Sun God
        - Pigeon Wing
      - Ossian
        - Gyere Velem
        - Aurelianus
        - Boxerl
        - Honfitars
        - Bogey
        - Koppany
        - Robogo
      - Patrick
      - Marat
      - Gondolier
    - Soberano
    - Champignol
      - Curuzu
    - Gay Lad
    - Le Basilic
    - Le Samaritain [ex-Leopard]
    - Chambertin
      - Cadet Roussel
        - Montmartin
    - Palmiste
      - Conde
      - Book
      - Madras
      - Bob
    - Buisson Ardent
    - Le Samaritain
      - Roi Herode
        - The Tetrarch
        - Bethleham
        - Hari Janos
        - Red King
        - Roi D'Ecosse
        - General Villa
        - Royal Canopy
        - Chrysolaus
        - King John
        - Prince Philip
        - Roi Hero
        - Balthesar
        - Grey Monk
        - Herodote
        - Leighton
        - Milesius
        - Norseman
        - Sir Greysteel
        - Boscombe
        - Herodias
        - Lackham
        - Roi Soleil
        - Roidore
        - St Donagh
        - Tullus Hostilius
        - Roigrey
      - Kildare
        - Tresspasser
      - Misraim
      - Inspector
      - Salvator Rosa
      - Isard
        - Filbert de Savoie
        - Guemil
        - Mandar
        - Belfonds
        - Andorra
        - Fortunio
      - Beware
      - Gran Senor
      - Grey Fox
        - Silver Fox
    - Holocauste
    - Spartivento
      - Excelsior
      - San Siro
    - Bravo Le Sancy
    - Le Souvenir
    - Nabot
      - Ryan
    - Saint Saulge
      - Cornimont
      - Rittersporn
    - Ex Voto
      - Messidor
      - Radis Rose
        - Serpenteau
      - Radis Rouge
        - Luck
      - Heros XII
      - L'yser
      - Dan IV
      - Le Fils de la Lune
    - Hebron
      - Ulm
      - Rioumajou
    - Le Flambeau
    - Le Puritain
    - Le Meteore
  - Fitz Roya
  - Le Capricorne
  - Fousi-Yama
  - Ravioli
  - Cherbourg

== Pedigree ==
Pedigree of Atlantic (GB), chestnut stallion, 1871
Sire Thormanby (GB) 1857	Windhound; 1849	Pantaloon	Castrel
Sire Thormanby (GB) 1857	Windhound; 1849	Pantaloon	Idalia
Sire Thormanby (GB) 1857	Windhound; 1849	Phryne	Touchstone
Sire Thormanby (GB) 1857	Windhound; 1849	Phryne	Decoy
Sire Thormanby (GB) 1857	Alice Hawthorn; 1838	Muley Moloch	Muley
Sire Thormanby (GB) 1857	Alice Hawthorn; 1838	Muley Moloch	Nancy
Sire Thormanby (GB) 1857	Alice Hawthorn; 1838	Rebecca	Lottery
Sire Thormanby (GB) 1857	Alice Hawthorn; 1838	Rebecca	Cervantes mare
Dam Hurricane (GB) 1859	Wild Dayrell; 1852	Ion	Cain
Dam Hurricane (GB) 1859	Wild Dayrell; 1852	Ion	Margaret
Dam Hurricane (GB) 1859	Wild Dayrell; 1852	Ellen Middleton	Bay Middleton
Dam Hurricane (GB) 1859	Wild Dayrell; 1852	Ellen Middleton	Myrrha
Dam Hurricane (GB) 1859	Midia; 1846	Scutari	Sultan
Dam Hurricane (GB) 1859	Midia; 1846	Scutari	Velvet
Dam Hurricane (GB) 1859	Midia; 1846	Marinella	Soothsayer
Dam Hurricane (GB) 1859	Midia; 1846	Marinella	Bess (Family:3-b)
