= Roi Herode =

French Thoroughbred racehorse and sire

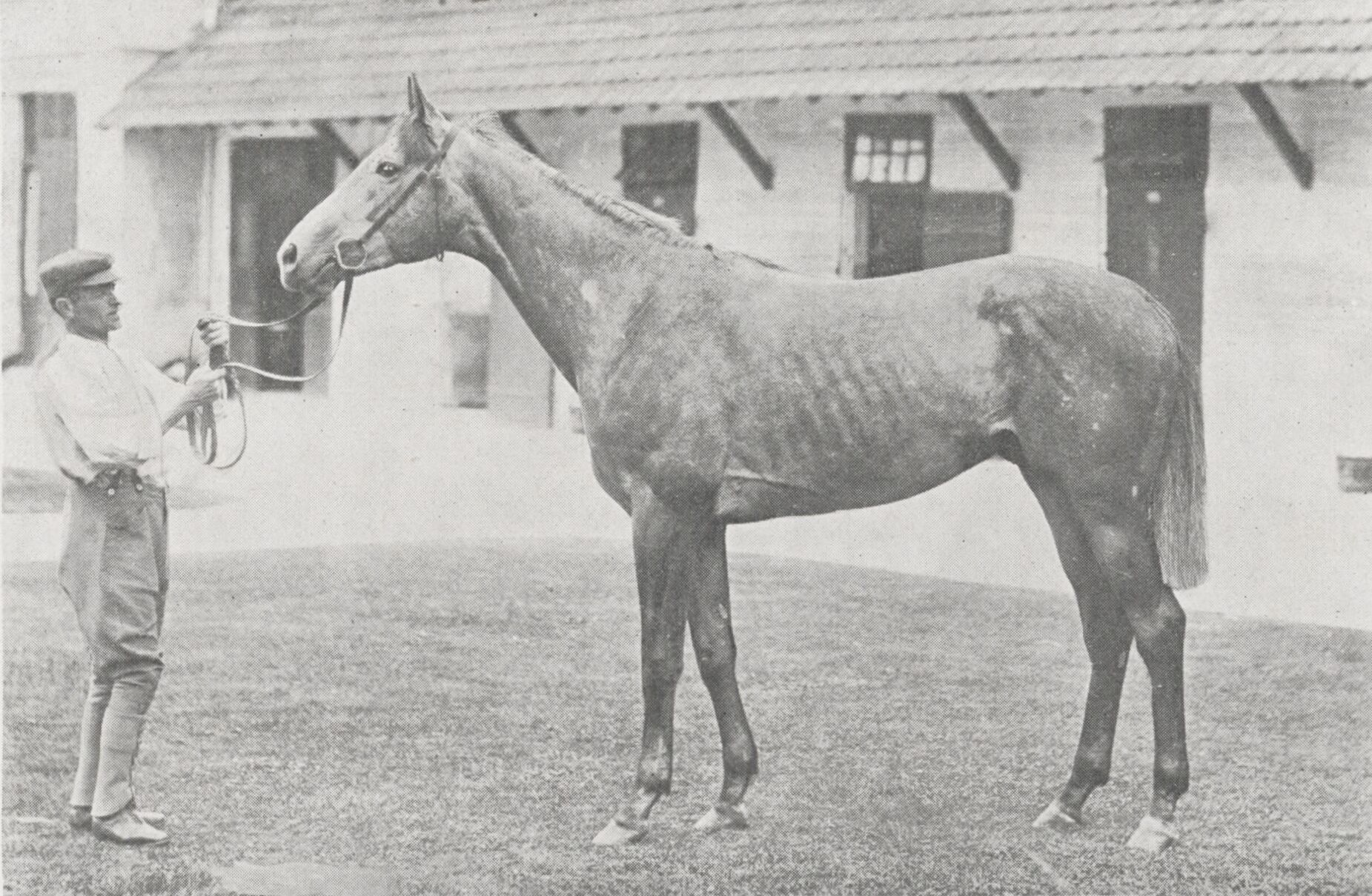
- From Le Sport universel illustré (26 October 1913)
- Sire: Le Samaritain
- Grandsire: Le Sancy
- Dam: Roxelane
- Damsire: War Dance
- Sex: Stallion
- Foaled: 1904
- Died: 1931 (aged 26–27)
- Country: France
- Colour: Grey
- Breeder: Maurice Caillaut
- Record: 24:3-6-1

Roi Herode (1904 – June 8, 1931) was a French Thoroughbred racehorse and sire. Though not a particularly successful racehorse, he has left a legacy in the stud, particularly in passing on the grey color found in most Thoroughbreds in modern times, due to his offspring The Tetrarch, Royal Canopy, and La Grisette.

== Background ==
Roi Herode was bred by Maurice Caillaut and born in 1904. He was purchased in 1909 by Edward Kennedy with the objective of reviving the Herod sire line in Great Britain. Roi Herode's name means "King Herod" in French, the ruler of Judea at the time of birth of Jesus.

== Racing career ==
1907

Won the Prix de la Neva, and finished 2nd in the Prix La Rouchette, Prix du Presidente de la Republique, Prix de Rocquencourt, and Prix Royal Oak.

1908

Won the Grand Prix de la Ville de Vichy, and finished 2nd in the Prix de Madrid.

1909

Won the Prix de la Table, finished 2nd in the Doncaster Cup, and 3rd in the Prix Hocquart.

== Stud career ==
Notable progeny include:

- The Tetrarch (b. 1911): undefeated in seven starts
- Hari Janos (b. 1912): winner of the Magyar St Legar Stakes
- Lady Comfey (b. 1913): foaled American Flag, champion 3 year-old horse in the United States
- Royal Canopy (b. 1914): sired Bonne Nuit, founder of a dynasty of show jumping horses in the United States
- Judea (b. 1915): winner of the Irish Oaks and foaled Zionist, Irish Derby winner
- King John (b. 1915): winner of the Irish Derby
- St Donagh (b. 1922): winner of the Irish 2,000 Guineas
- Cinq a Sept (b. 1924): winner of the Irish Oaks

== Grey color influence ==
The most common source of grey color Thoroughbred horses is through Roi Herode. This influence can be found primarily through his son The Tetrarch and daughter La Grisette (4th dam of Native Dancer). The Tetrarch grey color influence has been most pronounced in modern times due to the stallions Tapit and Unbridled's Song. Bonne Nuit, who was grand sire of Roi Herode through his son Royal Canopy, started a dynasty of show jumping horses in the United States, which helps perpetuate the grey color influence through show jumping horses.

== Sire line tree ==
- Roi Herode
  - Bethleham
    - Erehwemos
      - Foxhunter
  - Hari Janos
  - Red King
  - Roi D'Ecosse
  - General Villa
  - Royal Canopy
    - Zanoni
      - Galloglass
    - Purple Shade
      - Hakukou
      - Holger Danske
    - Kentucky
    - Silver Canopy
    - The Grey Knight
    - Bonne Nuit
      - Night Lark
        - Out Late
        - Catch On Fire
      - Hollandia
      - Night Owl
      - Riviera Wonder
      - New Twist
        - Good Twist
          - Icey Twist
  - Chrysolaus
  - King John
    - Runnymede
    - Gascony
  - Prince Philip
  - Roi Hero
    - King Bird
  - Balthesar
    - Pirat
    - Casanova
  - Grey Monk
  - Herodote
    - Floral King
    - Alexis
  - Leighton
    - Paleta
    - High Comedy
    - Royal Artist
  - Milesius
    - Azucar
  - Norseman
  - Sir Greysteel
    - Khamseen
    - Corsican Blade
  - Boscombe
  - Herodias
  - Lackham
    - Golden Wings
    - Alchemic
  - Roi Soleil
  - Roidore
    - Harmachis
  - St Donagh
  - Tullus Hostilius
    - Lord Tullus
      - Cholm
  - Roigrey
  - The Tetrarch
    - Arch-Gift
      - Archway
      - Golden Oracle
      - Double Arch
    - Chaud
    - Stefan the Great
      - Chubasco
        - Guernanville
        - Chuchoteur
        - Annibal
      - Agathos
        - Athos
      - Niantic
      - Rosehearty
      - Tolgus
        - Ochiltree
      - Vespasian
      - Damon
      - Kiev
        - Kievex
      - Iron Crown
      - Cap Gris Nez
      - Jean Valjean
      - Silver Cord
      - Bushranger
      - King Kong
    - Viceroy
      - Celliota
    - Caligula
      - Prestissimo
        - Sir Roger
      - Star of Italy
    - Royal Alarm
      - Bacchus Rex
        - Dichato
      - Piamonte
      - Staretz
      - Caballero
    - Sarchedon
      - High Pitch
    - Serment D'Amour
    - Tea Tray
      - Kiosk
      - Bronze Tray
    - Tetrameter
      - Six Wheeler
        - Kicos
        - Lagunac
      - Millimetro
      - Kingsem
      - Sidenhuset
    - Tetratema
      - Rolls Royce
      - Fourth Hand
      - Treat
      - Royal Minstrel
        - Gay Monarch
        - Singing Wood
        - Mr Bones
        - Court Scandal
        - Melodist
        - Time Step
        - First Fiddle
      - Mr Jinks
        - Maltravers
        - Fair William
        - Rogerstone Castle
        - The Jigger
        - Effervescence
      - To You
      - Teacup
      - Tetrarchal
      - Arthos
      - Sherab
        - Doublrab
      - Tetramite
      - Thyestes
      - Bacteriophage
        - Teleferique
        - Bacchus
        - Irifle
      - Strathcarron
      - Gino
        - American Way
      - Alishah
        - Allison
      - Satyr
      - Turbotin
        - Palatino
      - Theft
        - Hayatake
        - Cymba
        - High Record
        - Takakurayama
        - Issei
        - Tokino Minoru
        - Bostonian
      - Theio
      - Lay Lord
      - Foray
      - Tahir
      - Prometheus
      - Quarteroon
      - Prince Tetra
      - Tetrabar
      - Zalophus
        - Kilmore
    - Bouleverse
    - Corban
    - Polemarch
      - Hechicero
      - Ilion
      - Vino Puro
    - Precious
    - Syrian Prince
    - Tractor
    - Trash
    - Blue Ensign
      - Navigator
      - Somerset
    - Noblesse Oblige
    - Puttenden
    - Chief Ruler
      - Admiral Drake
      - Supremacy
      - Rulanut
      - Padishah
      - Gold Rod
      - Francis Drake
      - Royal Chief
        - Bruce
        - Royal Raider
        - Royal Tan
    - Synorix
    - Defiance
    - Old Rowley
      - Old Riley
      - Old Reliance
    - Salmon-Trout
      - Salmon Leap
      - Reel
      - King Salmon
        - Jamaica Inn
        - Royal Chaplain
        - King's Abbey
        - Treble Crown
        - Kingstone
        - John Moore
        - Manguari
        - Prosper
        - Quasi
        - Ubi
      - Gipsy George
      - Prawn Curry
    - Dear Herod
    - Ethnarch
      - Archon
      - Ethnos
    - The Satrap
      - Auralia

== Pedigree ==
Pedigree of Roi Herode, grey stallion, 1904
Sire Le Samaritain 1895	Le Sancy; 1884	Atlantic	Thormanby*
Sire Le Samaritain 1895	Le Sancy; 1884	Atlantic	Hurricane
Sire Le Samaritain 1895	Le Sancy; 1884	Gem of Gems	Stratchconan
Sire Le Samaritain 1895	Le Sancy; 1884	Gem of Gems	Poinsettia
Sire Le Samaritain 1895	Clementina; 1880	Doncaster	Stockwell
Sire Le Samaritain 1895	Clementina; 1880	Doncaster	Marigold
Sire Le Samaritain 1895	Clementina; 1880	Clemence	Newminster
Sire Le Samaritain 1895	Clementina; 1880	Clemence	Eulogy
Dam Roxelane 1894	War Dance; 1887	Galliard	Galopin
Dam Roxelane 1894	War Dance; 1887	Galliard	Mavis
Dam Roxelane 1894	War Dance; 1887	War Paint	Uncas
Dam Roxelane 1894	War Dance; 1887	War Paint	Piracy
Dam Roxelane 1894	Rose of York; 1880	Speculum	Vedette
Dam Roxelane 1894	Rose of York; 1880	Speculum	Doralice
Dam Roxelane 1894	Rose of York; 1880	Rouge Rose	Thormanby*
Dam Roxelane 1894	Rose of York; 1880	Rouge Rose	Ellen Horne

* Roi Herode is inbred 4S x 4D to the stallion Thormanby, meaning that he appears fourth generation on the sire side of his pedigree and fourth generation on the dam side of his pedigree.
