= Maintenon (horse) =

French-bred Thoroughbred racehorse

- Sire: Le Sagittaire
- Grandsire: Le Sancy
- Dam: Marcia
- Damsire: Marden
- Sex: Stallion
- Foaled: 1903
- Country: France
- Colour: Chestnut
- Breeder: Haras du Perray
- Owner: William Kissam Vanderbilt
- Trainer: William B. Duke
- Record: 19: 13-3-2
- Earnings: FF908,525

Major wins
- La Coupe d'Or (1906); Prix du Conseil Municipal (1906); Grand Prix de Deauville (1906); Grand Prix de Saint-Cloud (1906); Prix Monarque (1906); Prix Hocquart (1906); Prix du Jockey Club (1906); Prix Kergorlay (1906); Prix Lupin (1906); Prix Royal-Oak (1906); Prix Boiard (1907); Prix des Sablons (1907)

Awards
- Leading sire in France (1917)

Honours
- Prix de Maintenon at Maisons-Laffitte Racecourse

Maintenon (foaled 1903 in France) was a French Thoroughbred racehorse. He was bred by Gaston Dreyfus at his Haras du Perray in Les Bréviaires, Yvelines. Maintenon was out of the mare, Marcia, and sired by Le Sagittaire, a multiple winner of what today are Group One races.

Purchased as a yearling for twenty-three thousand French francs by American sportsman William Kissam Vanderbilt of the prominent Vanderbilt family of New York City, Maintenon was conditioned for racing by future U.S. Racing Hall of Fame trainer, William Duke. In 1906, Maintenon won ten major races in France, including the French Derby, and another two the following year.

In the 1906 Grand Prix de Paris, Maintenon was beaten by Epsom Derby winner Spearmint and in anticipation of a rematch, Vanderbilt entered the colt in the 1907 Ascot Gold Cup at Ascot Racecourse in England. However, in April 1907 Maintenon suffered a tendon injury and was retired to stud.

He first stood at Haras de Villebon in Villebon-sur-Yvette then at his owner's Haras du Quesnay. Among his offspring the most notable was Brumelli who won the 1917 Grand Prix de Paris and Prix du Jockey Club and who helped Maintenon become that year's Leading sire in France.

Following the death of owner Vanderbilt in 1922, the Haras du Quesnay and Maintenon were acquired by another American, A. Kingsley Macomber. The last foal sired by Maintenon was born in 1926.

== Pedigree ==
Pedigree of Maintenon, chestnut stallion, 1903
Sire Le Sagittaire 1892	Le Sancy	Atlantic	Thormanby
Sire Le Sagittaire 1892	Le Sancy	Atlantic	Hurricane
Sire Le Sagittaire 1892	Le Sancy	Gem of Gems	Strathconan*^
Sire Le Sagittaire 1892	Le Sancy	Gem of Gems	Poinsettia
Sire Le Sagittaire 1892	La Dauphine	Doncaster	Stockwell
Sire Le Sagittaire 1892	La Dauphine	Doncaster	Marigold
Sire Le Sagittaire 1892	La Dauphine	Sly	Strathconan*^
Sire Le Sagittaire 1892	La Dauphine	Sly	Slut
Dam Marcia 1887	Marden	Hermit	Newminster*^
Dam Marcia 1887	Marden	Hermit	Seclusion
Dam Marcia 1887	Marden	Barchettina	Pelion
Dam Marcia 1887	Marden	Barchettina	Cymba
Dam Marcia 1887	Primavera	Springfield	St Albans
Dam Marcia 1887	Primavera	Springfield	Viridis
Dam Marcia 1887	Primavera	Opaline	Vertugadin
Dam Marcia 1887	Primavera	Opaline	Ouvreuse (family: 2-a)

*^ Maintenon is inbred 5S x 5S x 4D to the stallion Newminster, meaning that he appears fifth generation twice (via Strathconan)^ on the sire side of his pedigree and fourth generation once on the dam side of his pedigree.
