= Thormanby (horse) =

British-bred Thoroughbred racehorse

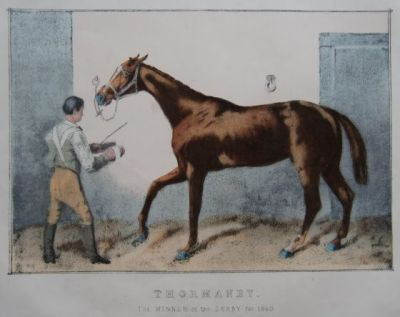
- Thormanby. Lithograph by John Sherer
- Sire: Windhound
- Grandsire: Pantaloon
- Dam: Alice Hawthorn
- Damsire: Muley Moloch
- Sex: Stallion
- Foaled: 1857
- Country: United Kingdom of Great Britain and Ireland
- Colour: Chestnut
- Breeder: Benjamin Plummer
- Owner: James Merry
- Trainer: Mathew Dawson
- Record: 24: 14–4–4

Major wins
- Gimcrack Stakes (1859); Epsom Derby (1860); Ascot Gold Cup (1861)

Awards
- Leading sire in Great Britain and Ireland (1869)

Thormanby (1857–1875) was a British Thoroughbred racehorse and sire. In a career that lasted from May 1859 to July 1861, he ran twenty-four times and won fourteen races. He was regarded by experts as one of the outstanding horses of his era.

After winning nine races, including the Gimcrack Stakes at York as a two-year-old in 1859 he won The Derby on his first start of 1860. Although he failed to reproduce his best form in the autumn of his three-year-old season, he returned in 1861 to win his first four races including the Ascot Gold Cup.

At the end of the 1861 season, he was retired to stud where he sired the winners of many important races. His grandson, Bend Or, became the direct male ancestor of most modern Thoroughbred racehorses.

== Background ==
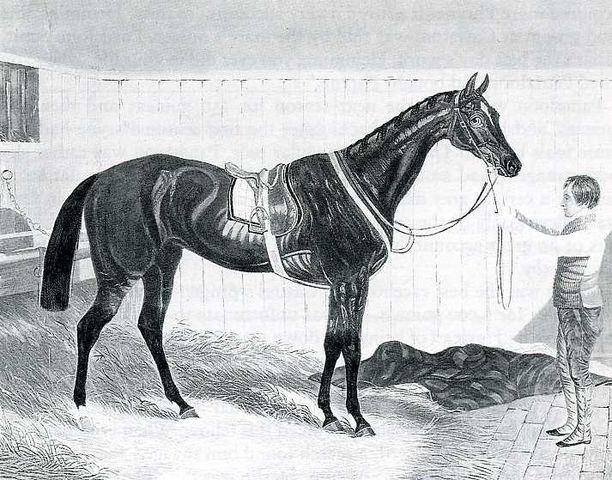
Alice Hawthorn. The winner of 52 races and Thormanby's dam

Thormanby was a lean, wiry, rather plain-looking chestnut horse with a white stripe and a white sock on his left hind leg. He was bred by Benjamin Plummer who had difficulty finding a buyer for the young horse as a yearling at the Doncaster sales, before selling him privately for £350 to the trainer Mathew Dawson. Dawson bought the colt for his principal patron James Merry, who was initially reluctant to complete the transaction. Dawson had to keep and feed the horse at his own expense for several months before Merry agreed to hand over the money. Dawson trained the colt at Russley Park, near Lambourn.

Thormanby's dam was the outstanding race mare Alice Hawthorn, who won fifty-two races including the Goodwood and Doncaster Cups. The identity of his sire was officially problematic, as Alice Hawthorn was covered by two stallions, Windhound and Melbourne in 1856. Melbourne, the sire of the Triple Crown winner West Australian was, however, true-breeding bay, meaning that all his registered offspring were bay or brown. It is almost certain, therefore, that the chestnut Thormanby was a son of the less famous Windhound. This view was supported by the testimony of Mathew Dawson, who was working at the stud at the time of Thormanby's conception: he reported that Alice Hawthorn had rejected Melbourne, but been receptive to Windhound.

== Racing career ==
=== 1859: two-year-old season ===
Thormanby, like many of Dawson's horses, was highly tried as a two-year-old, running fourteen times. In spring he won minor races at Northampton, York and Chester and finished third to Lupellus at Epsom. The Field described him as "by far the best" of the early two-year-olds.

At Royal Ascot in June Thormanby won a Biennial Stakes, beating Lupellus, and then finished second to Rupee in a field of twenty runners for the New Stakes. At Goodwood in July, he ran twice, winning the Lavant Stakes and finishing third in the Findon Stakes. He ran three times at the York meeting in August, running third in the Convivial Stakes and then winning the Eglington Stakes and the meeting's premier two-year-old race, the Gimcrack Stakes.

In Autumn, Thormanby was sent to race at Newmarket, where he ran three times. He finished third in the Eglington Stakes and then won the Prendergast Stakes. On his final start of the year, he recorded his second important win, beating seven rivals to win the valuable Criterion Stakes by a length.

=== 1860: three-year-old season ===
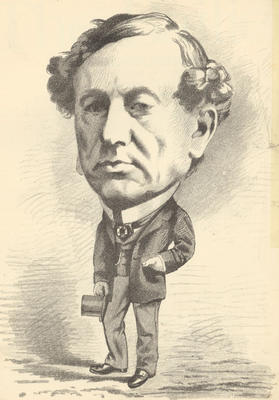
James Merry, Thormanby's owner, who initially refused to pay for the future Derby winner

Thormanby did not run as a three-year-old before the Derby. In spring, a colt named "The Wizard" won the 2000 Guineas in impressive style and was made favourite for the Derby. Thormanby, however, had been performing exceptionally well in training, notably when giving thirteen pounds and a decisive beating to a good colt called Northern Light. When Dawson was told that The Wizard had proved himself to be a "tremendous horse", he replied, "Who's afraid?" Dawson did, in fact, fear that attempts would be made to deliberately injure or "nobble" Thormanby and took steps to protect him, including switching his jockeys' racing colours at the last moment to confuse any potential assailants.

At Epsom on 23 May, Thormanby impressed observers when he appeared in the paddock before the Derby: his coat was "like a mirror" and as he galloped to the start, he "hardly seemed to touch the ground." He started the 4/1 second favourite in a field of thirty runners, with The Wizard being made 3/1 favourite and the American-bred colt Umpire, whose supporters included the famous boxer John C. Heenan, being also strongly fancied. The attendance for the race was estimated at up to 480,000. Ridden by Harry Custance, a lightweight jockey who had to carry twenty-two pounds of lead in his saddle to make the required weight, Thormanby raced just behind the leaders in the early stages before making his challenge on the outside early in the straight. A furlong from the finish Thormanby overtook The Wizard and went into the lead, from which point on the result was not in doubt. Thormanby won easily by one and a half lengths from The Wizard, with the outsider Horror taking third. James Merry reportedly took more than £85,000 in winning bets.

Thormanby was rested after the Derby before returning in September for the St Leger for which he started 9/4 favourite in a field of fourteen. Thormanby held third place turning into the straight but faded in the closing stages and finished fifth, four lengths behind the winner St Albans. Two days later Thormanby reappeared in the Doncaster Cup over two and a half miles. He was held up in the early stages before making a strong challenge in the straight, but was beaten three lengths by Sabreur, to whom he was conceding seven pounds. He was then sent to Newmarket where he was beaten two lengths by The Wizard at level weights in the Grand Duke Michael Stakes on 25 September. On his final run of the year he finished second in a sweepstakes at Newmarket.

=== 1861: four-year-old season ===
Thormanby's four-year-old season began at Newmarket in April, when he won the Claret Stakes, finishing thirty lengths clear of his two rivals. At the next Newmarket meeting Thormanby claimed two prizes without having to run in a competitive race. No horse appeared to oppose him and he was allowed to "walk over" in both events.

At Royal Ascot in June, Thormanby contested the two and a half mile Ascot Gold Cup, at that time the most prestigious weight-for-age race of the season. He started the 6/5 favourite, with St Albans and Parmesan being regarded as his main rivals. Thormanby raced lazily, so that Custance had to "waken him up" by using his spurs, but in the straight he produced a strong run to overtake Parmesan and easily held the late challenge of the filly Fairwater to win by two lengths. On his final race, Thormanby ran poorly, finishing unplaced in the Goodwood Cup.

== Assessment ==
In May 1886 The Sporting Times carried out a poll of one hundred racing experts to create a ranking of the best British racehorses of the 19th century. Thormanby was ranked seventeenth, having been placed in the top ten by sixteen of the contributors. He was the third highest British horse the 1860s behind Gladiateur and West Australian.

At the end of his racing career, The Field described Thormanby as

... the champion of his order, the best horse in the world...

== Stud career ==
Thormanby stood as a stallion at Croft stud, near Darlington, Park Paddocks at Newmarket and the Moorlands stud near York. He was a successful stallion, siring the 2000 Guineas winners Atlantic and Charibert and being the Champion sire of 1869. He is present in the pedigrees of almost all modern Thoroughbreds through his daughter, Rouge Rose, who produced the Derby Winner Bend Or. Thormanby sired almost a hundred winners before dying suddenly at the age of eighteen in 1875. Thormanby's tail was mounted and fashioned into a whisk which was hung in the hall of Mathew Dawson's Heath House at Newmarket.

== Sire line tree ==
- Thormanby
  - Plaudit
    - Balfe
  - Cap-A-Pie
  - John Bull
  - Sunstroke
  - Glengarry
    - Harry Glenn
    - Stuyvesant
    - Kingman
  - Thorwaldsen
  - Albany
    - Burlington
      - Vogengang
    - Oudeis
    - Disowned
  - Barford
  - Normanby
  - By The Sea
    - Genoves
      - Turin
  - Merry Sunshine
  - Atlantic
    - Pacific
    - Le Sancy
      - Le Hadji
      - Le Justicier
      - Le Sagittaire
        - Maintenon
        - Ossian
        - Patrick
        - Marat
        - Gondolier
      - Soberano
      - Champignol
        - Curuzu
      - Gay Lad
      - Le Basilac
      - Le Samaritain [ex-Leopard]
      - Chambertin
        - Cadet Roussel
      - Palmiste
        - Conde
        - Book
        - Madras
        - Bob
      - Buisson Ardent
      - Le Samaritain
        - Roi Herode
        - Kildare
        - Misraim
        - Inspector
        - Salvator Rosa
        - Isard
        - Beware
        - Gran Senor
        - Grey Fox
      - Palmiste
      - Holocauste
      - Spartivento
        - Excelsior
        - San Siro
      - Bravo Le Sancy
      - Le Souvenir
      - Nabot
        - Ryan
      - Saint Saulge
        - Cornimont
        - Rittersporn
      - Ex Voto
        - Messidor
        - Radis Rose
        - Radis Rouge
        - Heros XII
        - L'yser
        - Dan IV
        - Le Fils de la Lune
      - Hebron
        - Ulm
        - Rioumajou
      - Le Flambeau
      - Le Puritain
      - Le Meteore
    - Fitz Roya
    - Le Capricorne
    - Fousi-Yama
    - Ravioli
    - Cherbourg
  - Rostrevor
    - Ilex
  - Thuringian Prince
  - Tomahawk
  - Charibert
    - Help
    - Workington
    - The Lover
    - Csaplaros
    - Hagen

== Pedigree ==
Pedigree of Thormanby (GB), chestnut stallion, 1857
Sire Windhound (GB) 1847	Pantaloon; 1824	Castrel	Buzzard
Sire Windhound (GB) 1847	Pantaloon; 1824	Castrel	Alexander mare
Sire Windhound (GB) 1847	Pantaloon; 1824	Idalia	Peruvian
Sire Windhound (GB) 1847	Pantaloon; 1824	Idalia	Musidora
Sire Windhound (GB) 1847	Phryne; 1840	Touchstone	Camel
Sire Windhound (GB) 1847	Phryne; 1840	Touchstone	Banter
Sire Windhound (GB) 1847	Phryne; 1840	Decoy	Filho da Puta
Sire Windhound (GB) 1847	Phryne; 1840	Decoy	Finesse
Dam Alice Hawthorn (GB) 1838	Muley Moloch; 1830	Muley	Orville
Dam Alice Hawthorn (GB) 1838	Muley Moloch; 1830	Muley	Eleanor
Dam Alice Hawthorn (GB) 1838	Muley Moloch; 1830	Nancy	Dick Andrews
Dam Alice Hawthorn (GB) 1838	Muley Moloch; 1830	Nancy	Spitfire
Dam Alice Hawthorn (GB) 1838	Rebecca; 1831	Lottery	Tramp
Dam Alice Hawthorn (GB) 1838	Rebecca; 1831	Lottery	Mandane
Dam Alice Hawthorn (GB) 1838	Rebecca; 1831	Cervantes mare	Cervantes
Dam Alice Hawthorn (GB) 1838	Rebecca; 1831	Cervantes mare	Anticipation (Family: 4)
