= Kingman (horse) =

American-bred Thoroughbred racehorse

- Sire: Glengarry
- Grandsire: Thormanby
- Dam: Patricia
- Damsire: Vauxhall
- Sex: Stallion
- Foaled: 1888
- Country: United States
- Colour: Bay
- Breeder: A.C. Franklin
- Owner: Jacobin Stable (Kinzea Stone & Dudley Allen)
- Trainer: Dudley Allen
- Record: 28: 10-6-6
- Earnings: $19,365

Major wins
- Phoenix Stakes (1891); St. Paul Free Handicap (1891); Latonia Derby (1891) American Classics wins: Kentucky Derby (1891)

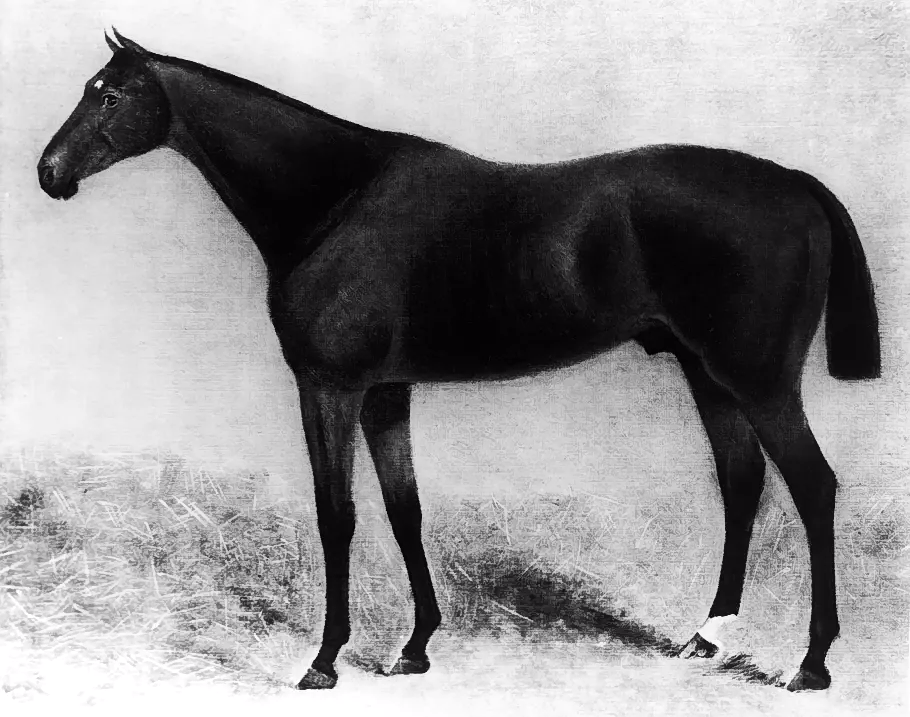

Kingman (1888–1893) was an American Thoroughbred racehorse owned by the racing partnership of Preston Kinzea Stone, a businessman from Georgetown, Kentucky and trainer Dudley Allen of Lexington Kentucky. Kingman was the winner of the 1891 Kentucky Derby as well as that year's Phoenix Stakes and Latonia Derby. Run on a track rated as slow, the Kentucky Derby's winning time remains the record for the slowest winning time ever recorded at a Kentucky Derby, at 2:52 1/4. Kingman was ridden in the Derby by Isaac Burns Murphy and was considered one of the best prospects for winning the 1891 American Derby. However, Kingman finished third in that race and won few races of importance thereafter.

Kingman was bought by John E. Madden of Louisville, Kentucky in the latter part of 1891 for $5,000 at the Jacobin Stable dispersal sale. Kingman did not race after three years old and died in 1893 at the age of five.

== Pedigree ==
Pedigree of Kingman
| Sire Glengarry 1866 | Thormanby 1857 | Windhound | Pantaloon |
| Sire Glengarry 1866 | Thormanby 1857 | Windhound | Phryne |
| Sire Glengarry 1866 | Thormanby 1857 | Alice Hawthorn | Muley Moloch |
| Sire Glengarry 1866 | Thormanby 1857 | Alice Hawthorn | Rebecca |
| Sire Glengarry 1866 | Carbine 1858 | Rifleman | Touchstone |
| Sire Glengarry 1866 | Carbine 1858 | Rifleman | Camp Follower |
| Sire Glengarry 1866 | Carbine 1858 | Troica | Lanercost |
| Sire Glengarry 1866 | Carbine 1858 | Troica | Sibera |
| Dam Patricia 1879 | Vauxhall 1865 | Lexington | Boston |
| Dam Patricia 1879 | Vauxhall 1865 | Lexington | Alice Carneal |
| Dam Patricia 1879 | Vauxhall 1865 | Verona | Yorkshire |
| Dam Patricia 1879 | Vauxhall 1865 | Verona | Britannia |
| Dam Patricia 1879 | Minnie MC 1870 | Planet | Revenue |
| Dam Patricia 1879 | Minnie MC 1870 | Planet | Nina |
| Dam Patricia 1879 | Minnie MC 1870 | Edina | Knight of St George |
| Dam Patricia 1879 | Minnie MC 1870 | Edina | Edith |
