= 1891 Grand National =

English steeplechase horse race

- Grand National
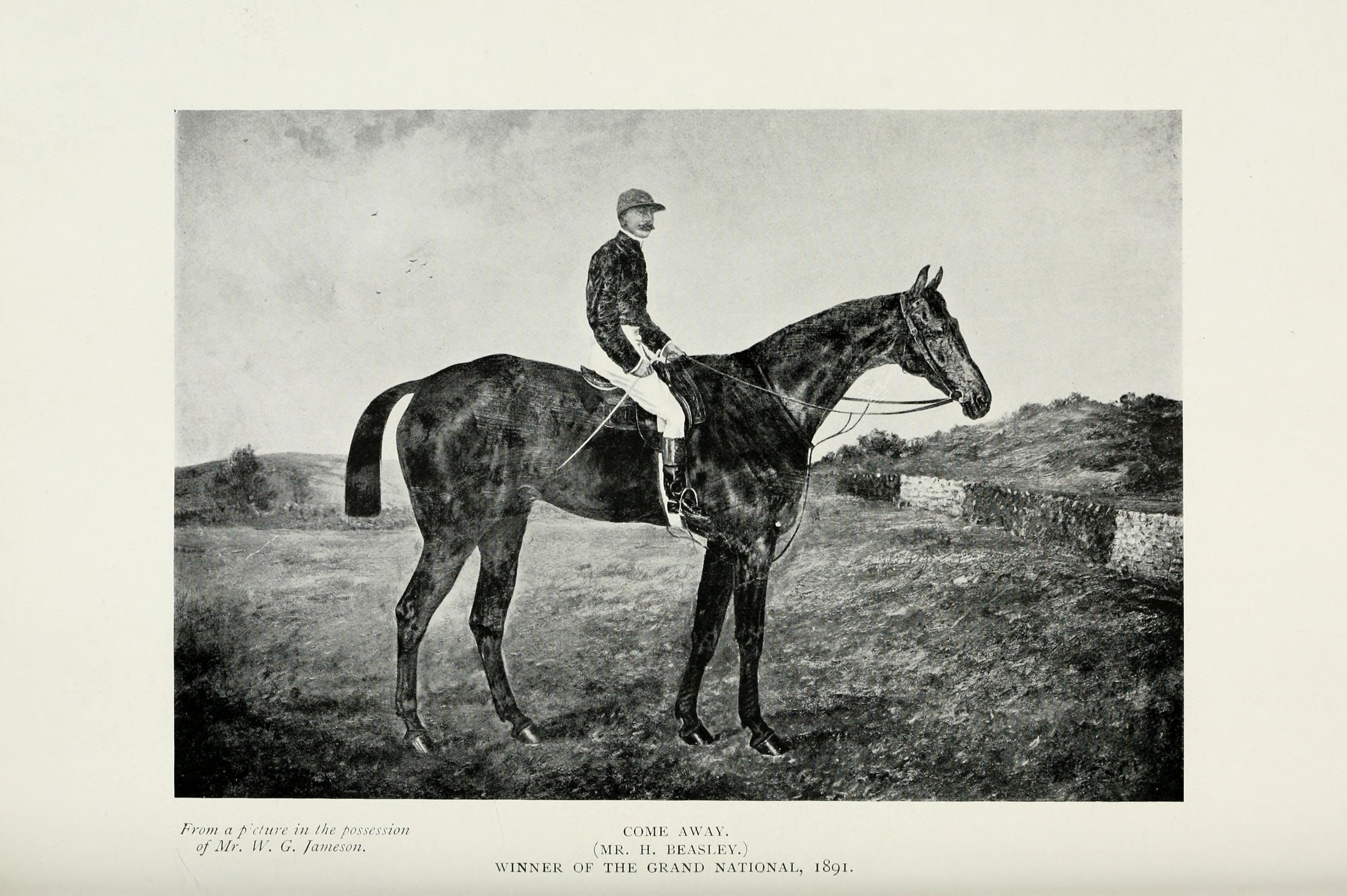
- Come Away and H. Beasley (from Heroes and heroines of the Grand National)
- Location: Aintree
- Date: 20 March 1891
- Winning horse: Come Away
- Starting price: 4/1 F
- Jockey: Mr Harry Beasley IRE
- Trainer: Harry Beasley IRE
- Owner: Willie Jameson
- Conditions: Good to firm

The 1891 Grand National was the 53rd renewal of the Grand National horse race that took place at Aintree near Liverpool, England, on 20 March 1891.

== Finishing order ==
Position	Name	Jockey	Age	Handicap (st-lb)	SP	Distance
01	Come Away	Mr Harry Beasley	7	11-12	4-1	Half a length
02	Cloister	Capt Roddy Owen	?	11-7	20-1	
03	Ilex	Arthur Nightingall	?	12-3	5-1	
04	Roquefort	Guy	?	?	40-1	
05	Cruiser	Mr Tommy Beasley	?	10-8	7-1	
06	Gamecock	Bill Dollery	?	12-4	66-1	

== Non-finishers ==
Fence	Name	Jockey	Age	Handicap (st-lb)	SP	Fate
29	Why Not	Mr Charles Cunningham	?	12-4	100-9	Fell
08	Roman Oak	Harry Escott	?	12-0	100-9	Knocked Over
23	Voluptuary	Mr EP Wilson	?	11-3	66-1	Pulled Up
22	Emperor	William Nightingall	?	11-3	25-1	Pulled Up
04	Choufleur	Terry Kavanagh	?	11-3	25-1	Fell
25	Veil	Mr William Moore	?	10-13	25-1	Fell
22	Dominion	Thornton	?	10-13	66-1	Pulled Up
08	Grape Vine	Joseph Hoysted	?	10-7	9-1	Fell
07	Jeanie	Arthur Barker	?	10-4	66-1	Fell
03	Brunswick	George Mawson	?	10-4	40-1	Fell
02	Flower of the Forest	P Clark	?	10-4	50-1	Fell
22	Young Glasgow	R Mitchell	?	10-3	40-1	Fell
21	Fireball	William Halsey	?	10-0	100-1	Pulled Up
21	Adelaide	Albert Ripley	?	10-0	200-1	Pulled Up
03	Nasr Ed Din	Henry Brown	?	10-0	50-1	Fell
