= 1891 Kentucky Derby =

Horse race

17th Kentucky Derby
- Kentucky Derby
- Grade I stakes race
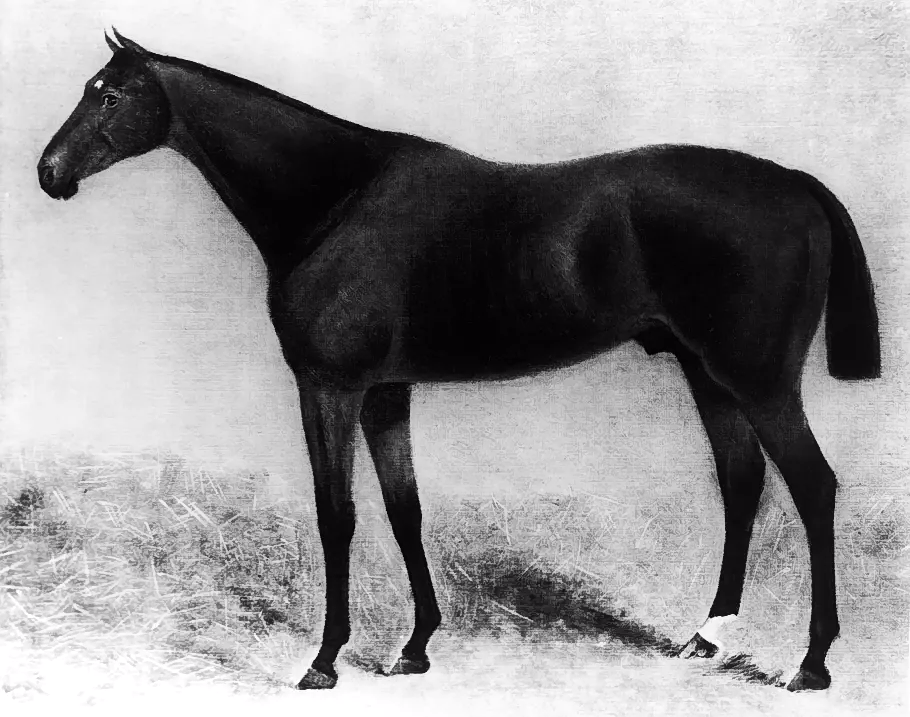
- Kingman, winner of the 1891 Kentucky Derby
- Location: Churchill Downs
- Date: May 13, 1891
- Winning horse: Kingman
- Jockey: Isaac Burns Murphy
- Trainer: Dudley Allen
- Owner: Jacobin Stable
- Surface: Dirt (rated slow)

The 1891 Kentucky Derby was the 17th running of the Kentucky Derby. The race took place on May 13, 1891. Run on a track rated as slow, the winning time of 2:52.25 was the slowest winning time in Derby history.

With each rider under orders to stay off the lead until the stretch, all four horses ran abreast the whole way waiting for someone to make a move. This resulted in the field to canter their way around the track going a mile in 2:01, a mile and a quarter in 2:26 3/4 and finishing the mile and half race in 2:52.

== Full results ==
Finished	Post	Horse	Jockey	Trainer	Owner	Time / behind
1st	3	Kingman	Isaac Murphy	Dudley Allen	Jacobin Stable (Preston Kinzea Stone & Dudley Allen).	2:52.25
2nd	4	Balgowan	Monk Overton		Thomas J. Clay	1/2
3rd	1	High Tariff	Robert "Tiny" Williams		Augustus Eastin & Samuel E. Larabie	1
4th	2	Hart Wallace	Thomas Kiley		Bashford Manor Stable	1/2

- Winning breeder: A. C. Franklin (TN)

== Payout ==
- The winner received a purse of $4,550.
- Second place received $300.
- Third place received $150.
