= French Open =

Annual tennis tournament held in Paris

- Official website
- Founded: 1891; 135 years ago
- Editions: 125 (2026); 96 Grand Slam events (since 1925)
- Location: Paris, France
- Venue: Stade Roland Garros (since 1928)
- Surface: Clay – outdoors (Note: Except Court Philippe Chatrier & Court Suzanne Lenglen during rain; each having a retractable roof) (1908–present); Sand – outdoors (1892–1907); Grass – outdoors (1891)
- Prize money: €56,352,000 (2025)

Men's
- Draw: S (128Q) / 64D (16Q) (Note: In the main draws, there are 128 singles players (S) and 64 doubles teams (D), and there are 128 and 16 entrants in the respective qualifying (Q) draws.)
- Current champions: Alexander Zverev (singles); Marcel Granollers; Horacio Zeballos (doubles)
- Most singles titles: Rafael Nadal (14)
- Most doubles titles: Roy Emerson (6)

Women's
- Draw: S (128Q) / 64D (16Q)
- Current champions: Mirra Andreeva (singles); Kateřina Siniaková; Taylor Townsend (doubles)
- Most singles titles: Chris Evert (7)
- Most doubles titles: Martina Navratilova (7)

Mixed doubles
- Draw: 32
- Current champions: Sara Errani; Andrea Vavassori
- Most titles (male): Ken Fletcher / Jean-Claude Barclay (3)
- Most titles (female): Margaret Court (4)

Grand Slam
- Australian Open; French Open; Wimbledon; US Open

Last completed
- 2026 French Open

The French Open (French: Internationaux de France de tennis), also known as Roland-Garros (French: [ʁɔlɑ̃ ɡaʁos]), is a tennis tournament organized by the French Tennis Federation annually at Stade Roland Garros in Paris, France. It is chronologically the second of the four Grand Slam tennis events every year, held after the Australian Open and before Wimbledon and the US Open. It was established in 1891, but it did not become a Grand Slam level event until 1925.

The French Open begins in late May and continues for two weeks. (Note: Usually the tournament is held in late May to early June. However, there have been exceptions: The 1946 and 1947 tournaments were held in July after Wimbledon following the aftermath of World War II; 2020 was held in late September after the US Open following the suspension of ATP and WTA Tours from mid-March to August due to the COVID-19 pandemic; 2021 was postponed by one week due to the pandemic after virus cases rose in France in March of that year.) The tournament and venue are named after the French aviation pioneer and fighter pilot Roland Garros.

The French Open is the premier clay court tournament in the world and the only Grand Slam tournament currently held on this surface. Until 1975, the French Open was the only major tournament not played on grass. Due to the clay surface characteristics favoring long rallies and high physical demand, and the men's seven rounds of best-of-five sets needed for a championship, the French Open is widely regarded as the most physically demanding tournament in tennis.

== History ==
Officially named in French Internationaux de France de Tennis ("French Internationals of Tennis"), the tournament uses the name Roland-Garros (Note: The stadium and tournament are both hyphenated as Roland-Garros because French spelling rules dictate that in the name of a place or event named after a person, the elements of the name are joined with a hyphen.) in all languages, and it is usually called the French Open in English.

In 1891, the Championnat de France, which is commonly referred to in English as the "French Championships", began. This was only open to tennis players who were members of French clubs. The first winner was H. Briggs, a Briton who resided in Paris and was a member of the club Stade Français. In the final, he defeated P. Baigneres in straight sets. The first women's singles tournament, with four entries, was held in 1897. The mixed doubles event was added in 1902 and the women's doubles in 1907. In the period of 1915–1919, no tournament was organized due to World War I. This tournament was played until 1924, using four venues:

- Societé de Sport de l'Île de Puteaux (an island in the river Seine), in Puteaux; played on the club's ten sand grounds laid out on a bed of rubble. 1891, 1893, 1894 (men's singles), 1895 (men's singles), 1897 (women's singles), 1902 (women's singles and mixed doubles), 1905 (women's singles and mixed doubles), 1907 (men's singles, women's singles, mixed doubles) editions.
- The Croix-Catelan of the Racing Club de France (a club founded in 1882, which initially had two lawn-tennis courts with four more grass (pelouse) courts opened some years later, but due to the difficulty of maintenance, they were eventually transformed into clay courts) in the Bois de Boulogne, Paris. 1892, 1894 (men's doubles), 1895 (men's doubles), 1897 (women's singles), 1901 (men's doubles), 1903 (men's doubles and mixed doubles), 1904, 1907 (men's doubles), 1908, 1910–1914, 1920–1924 editions.
- Tennis Club de Paris (a club founded in 1895, which initially had four indoor wood courts and five outdoor clay courts), at 71, Boulevard Exelmans in the Auteuil neighborhood, Paris. 1896, 1897 (men's singles), 1898, 1899, 1900, 1901 (men's and women's singles), 1902 (men's singles), 1903 (men's singles and women's singles), 1905 (men's singles) and 1906 editions.
- Société Athlétique de la Villa Primrose in Bordeaux, on clay. Only played in 1909.

In 1925, the French Championships became open to all amateurs internationally and was designated a major championship by the International Lawn Tennis Federation. It was held on clay courts at the Stade Français in Saint-Cloud (site of the previous World Hard Court Championships) in 1925 and 1927. In 1926 the Croix-Catelan of the Racing Club de France hosted the event in Paris, the site of the previous French club members-only tournament, also on clay.

Another clay court tournament, called the World Hard Court Championships, is sometimes considered the true precursor to the modern French Open as it admitted international competitors. This was held at Stade Français in Saint-Cloud, from 1912 to 1914, 1920, 1921 and 1923, with the 1922 event held in Brussels, Belgium. Winners of this tournament included world No. 1s such as Anthony Wilding from New Zealand (1913, 1914) and Bill Tilden from the US (1921). In 1924 there was no World Hard Court Championships due to tennis being played at the Paris Olympic Games in Colombes.

After the Mousquetaires or Philadelphia Four (René Lacoste, Jean Borotra, Henri Cochet, and Jacques Brugnon) won the Davis Cup on American soil in 1927, the French decided to defend the cup in 1928 at a new tennis stadium at Porte d'Auteuil. The Stade Français president Émile Lesieur had offered the tennis authorities three hectares of land with the condition that the new stadium must be named after the World War I aviator hero Roland Garros, who was also a former HEC Paris business school classmate. The new Stade Roland Garros (whose central court was renamed Court Philippe Chatrier in 2001) hosted that Davis Cup challenge. On 24 May 1928, the French International Championships moved there, and the event has been held there ever since.

During World War II, the Tournoi de France was not held in 1940 and from 1941 through 1945 it took place on the same grounds, but those events are not recognized by the French governing body, the Fédération Française de Tennis. In 1946 and 1947, the French Championships were held after Wimbledon, making it the third Grand Slam event of the year. In 1968, the year of the French General Strike, the French Championships became the first Grand Slam tournament to go open, allowing both amateurs and professionals to compete.

Since 1981, new prizes have been presented: the Prix Orange (for the player demonstrating the best sportsmanship and cooperative attitude with the press), the Prix Citron (for the player with the strongest character and personality) and the Prix Bourgeon (for the tennis player revelation of the year). In another novelty, since 2006 the tournament has begun on a Sunday, featuring 12 singles matches played on the three main courts. Additionally, on the eve of the tournament's opening, the traditional Benny Berthet exhibition day takes place, where the profits go to different charity associations. In March 2007, it was announced that the event would provide equal prize money for both men and women in all rounds for the first time. In 2010, it was announced that the tournament was considering a move away from Roland Garros as part of a continuing rejuvenation. Plans to renovate and expand Roland Garros have put aside any such consideration, and the tournament remains in its long time home.

The 2022 edition finally saw a new tiebreaker format. If the deciding set is tied at six-all, the match is decided in a 10-point format. Should the tiebreaker game be tied at 9-all (or any tie hereafter), whoever goes two points ahead wins. The decision was made by the Grand Slam Board for all four Grand Slams "based on a strong desire to create greater consistency in the rules of the game at the grand slams, and thus enhance the experience for the players and fans alike", a statement from the Board read. The 2024 edition marked the first time that a member of the Big Three (Roger Federer, Rafael Nadal and Novak Djokovic) was not featured in the final since 2004.

=== Expansion ===
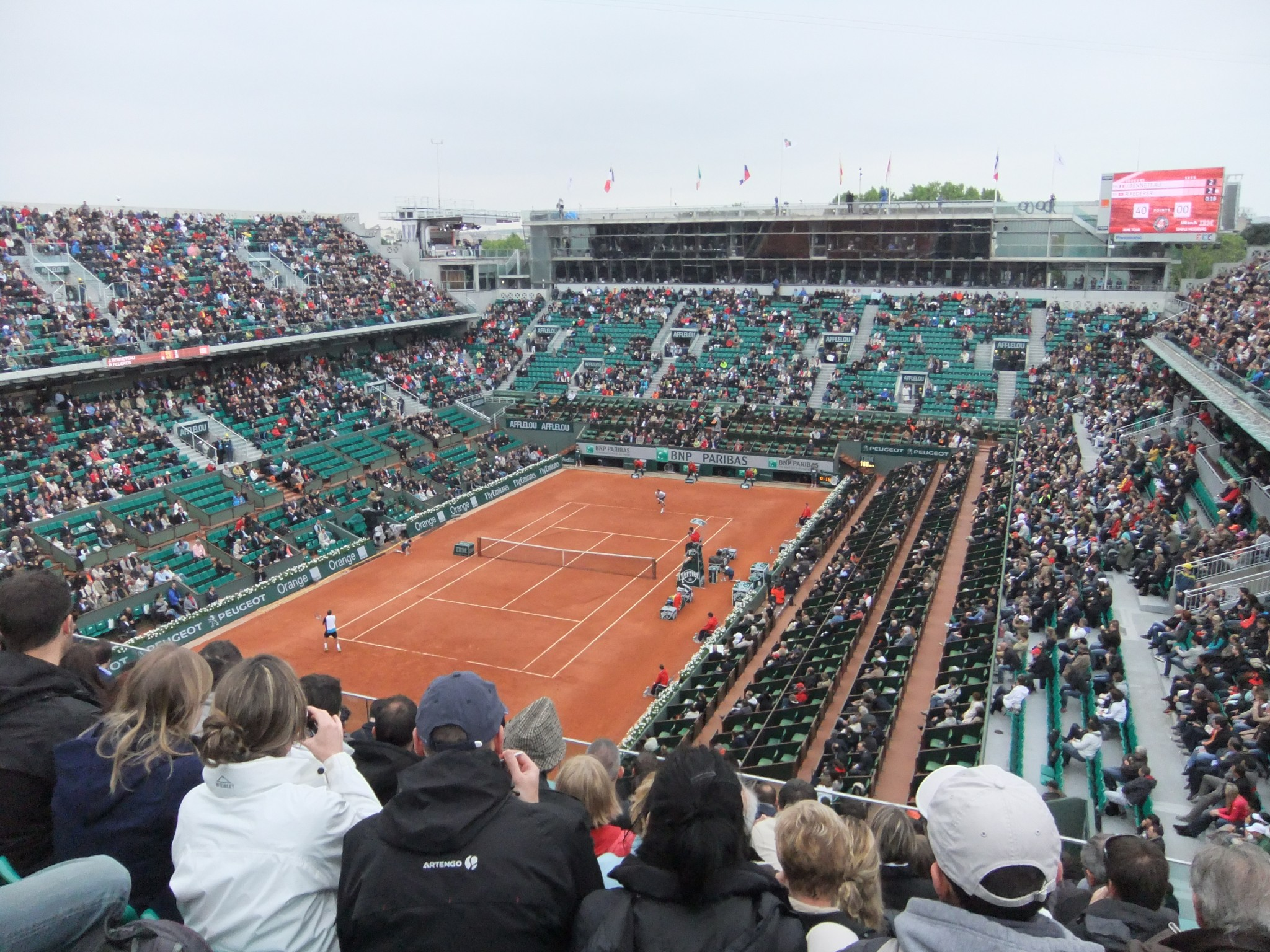
A match between Roger Federer and Julien Benneteau on Court Philippe Chatrier during the 2013 French Open

From 2004 to 2008, plans were developed to build a covered stadium with a roof, as complaints continued over delayed matches. Various proposals were put forward to expand the facility or to move the tournament to a completely new, 55-court venue outside of Paris city limits. In 2011 the decision was taken to maintain the tournament within its existing venue. The expansion project called for a new stadium to be built alongside the historical Auteuil's greenhouses and expansion of old stadiums and the tournament village. A wide-ranging project to overhaul the venue was presented in 2011, including building a roof over Court Philippe-Chatrier, demolishing and replacing Court No. 1 with a grassy hill for outdoors viewing, and geographical extension of the venue eastward into the Jardin des Serres d'Auteuil.

Legal opposition from environmental defence associations and other stakeholders delayed the works for several years as litigation ensued. In particular, the city council voted in May 2015 against the expansion project, but on 9 June 2015 Paris Mayor Anne Hidalgo announced the signing of the construction permits, with work scheduled to begin in September of that year and conclude in 2019. In December 2015, the Administrative Court of Paris once again halted renovation work, but the French Tennis Federation won the right to proceed with the renovation on appeal.

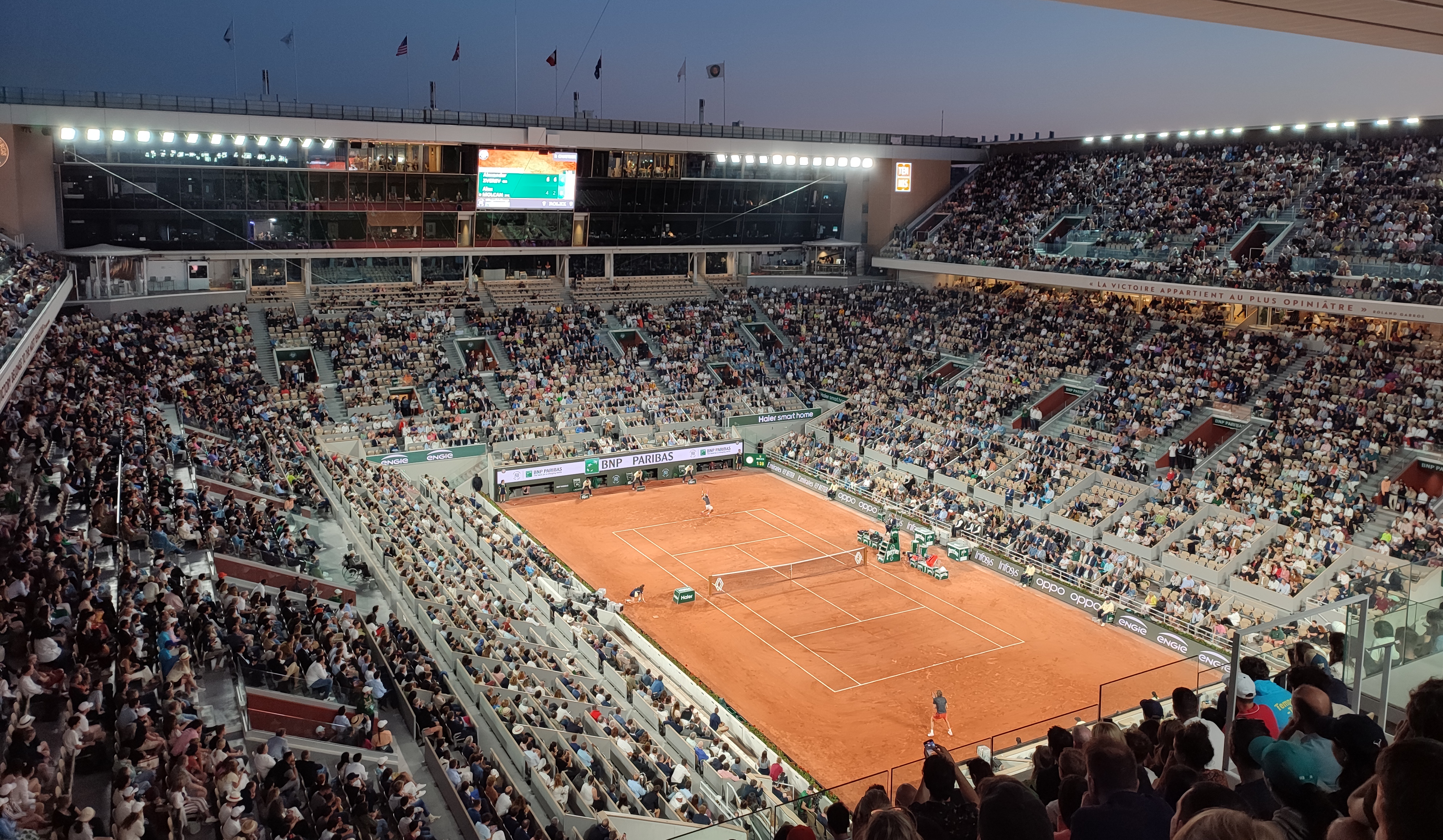
Court Philippe Chatrier in 2023 during a match between Alexander Zverev and Alex Molčan, after the renovation

Renovation work finally commenced at the close of the 2018 edition of the tournament. Redeveloped seating and a retractable roof was constructed for Court Philippe-Chatrier and the new 5,000-seat Court Simonne-Mathieu was opened, having been named after France's second-highest achieving female tennis player, and noted for its innovative use of greenhouse encasing architecture. The renewal of the venue has been generally well received by the players and the public. The 2020 edition of the tournament, which was the first to be assisted by the roof over Philippe-Chatrier, was postponed to late September and early October and was played in front of limited spectators, due to the COVID-19 pandemic. Floodlights were also installed over each of the courts in the precinct, allowing the tournament to facilitate night matches for the first time. In 2021, the tournament was back in the traditional slot of late May and early June.

=== Rafael Nadal tribute ===
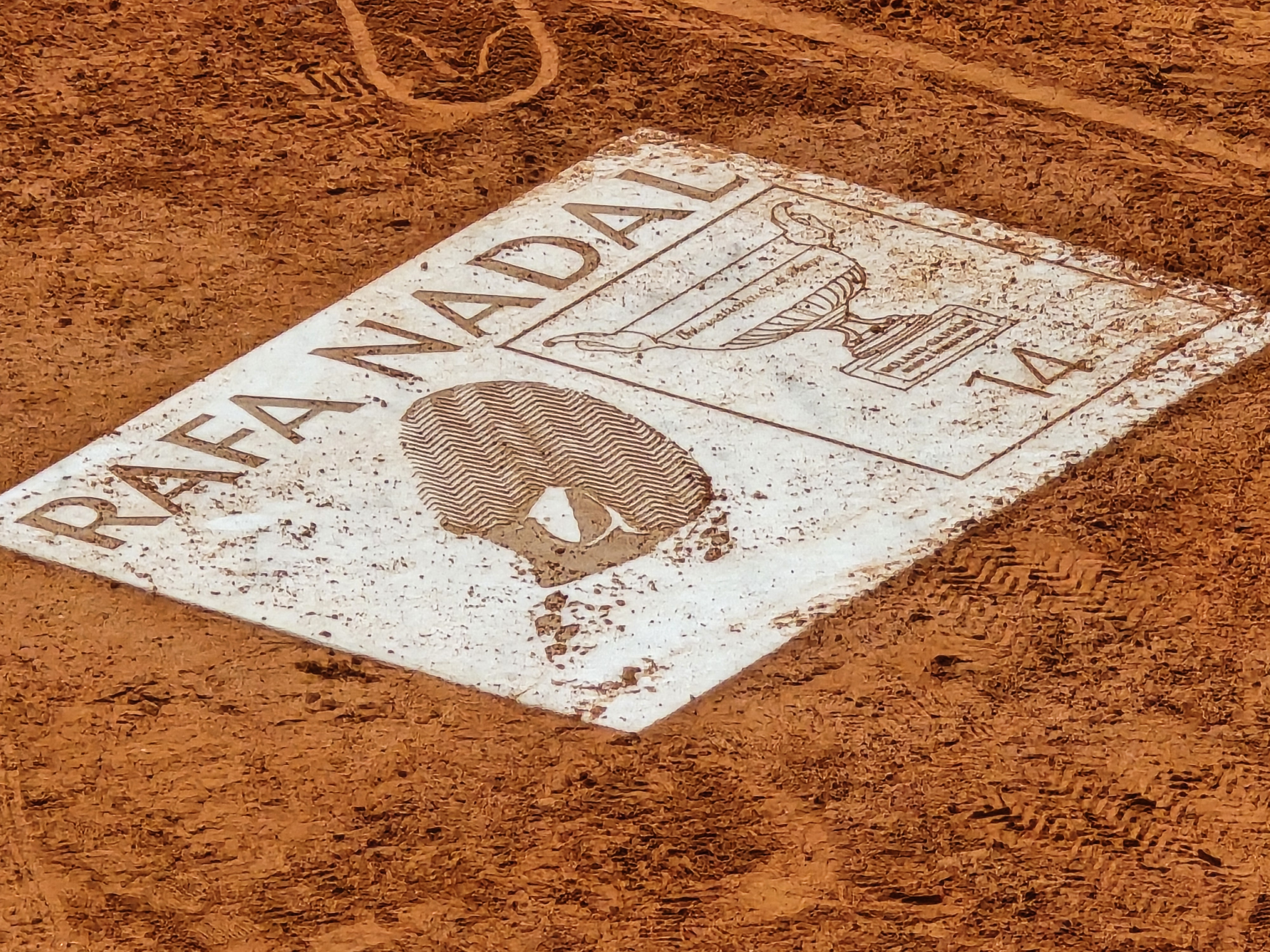
Commemorative plaque to Rafael Nadal unveiled during a tribute at the 2025 French Open, on the soil of the Court Philippe Chatrier

On 25 May 2025, the opening day of the 2025 tournament, Roland Garros organized a special farewell ceremony to honor 14-time champion Rafael Nadal following his retirement from professional tennis the previous year. Held on Court Philippe Chatrier, the ceremony featured tribute videos, a standing ovation from thousands of spectators, and on-court appearances by his longtime rivals Roger Federer, Novak Djokovic, and Andy Murray. The event culminated in the unveiling of a permanent commemorative white marble plaque embedded on the court surface near the net post. Designed in strict confidentiality by the French Tennis Federation (FFT), the 40×30 cm plaque features Nadal's name, an engraving of the Coupe des Mousquetaires with the number "14", and a replica of his right footprint set directly into the Parisian clay.

== Surface ==
The French Open has been the only major played on clay courts since 1978, when the US Open changed to hard courts. Clay is the slowest tennis court surface, as the fine layer of red clay dust on the topmost reduces the ball speed and causes it to bounce much higher when compared with hard courts and grass courts. For this specificity, the clay surface takes away some of the advantages of big servers and serve-and-volleyers, making it harder for these types of players to dominate on the surface. Pete Sampras, 14 Grand Slam winner and known for his excellent serve, never won the French Open – his best result being a semi-final in 1996. Other notable players who have won multiple Grand Slam events but have never won the French Open, includes John McEnroe, Jimmy Connors, John Newcombe, Venus Williams, Stefan Edberg, Virginia Wade, Boris Becker, Andy Murray, Louise Brough, and Martina Hingis; McEnroe and Edberg lost their only French Open finals appearances in five sets.

On the other hand, notable players have won multiple Grand Slam events including the French Open; among them are Rafael Nadal, Björn Borg, Steffi Graf, Ivan Lendl, Monica Seles, Novak Djokovic, Carlos Alcaraz, Mats Wilander, Serena Williams, Stan Wawrinka, Justine Henin and Chris Evert, showing proof of their great versatility. In the Open Era, the male players who have won both the French Open and Wimbledon, played on faster grass courts, are Rod Laver, Jan Kodeš, Björn Borg, Andre Agassi, Rafael Nadal, Roger Federer, Novak Djokovic and Carlos Alcaraz, for the female players those are Evonne Goolagong Cawley, Margaret Court, Billie Jean King, Chris Evert, Martina Navratilova, Steffi Graf, Serena Williams, Iga Świątek, Maria Sharapova, Garbiñe Muguruza, Simona Halep, Ashleigh Barty and Barbora Krejčíková. Borg's French Open–Wimbledon double was achieved three times consecutively.

The clay surface also makes the French Open unique in that it is the only Grand Slam tournament that still uses human line judges after Wimbledon's move to fully automated line calls in 2025. The challenge system does not exist at Roland Garros either due to not having the Hawk-Eye system installed; it is claimed that it is less reliable on clay courts due to dust coming up during play meaning that it cannot provide an accurate ruling. Players may still appeal close calls by requesting the chair umpire to come down and physically examine a ball mark made in the clay to determine whether a particular shot was in or out.

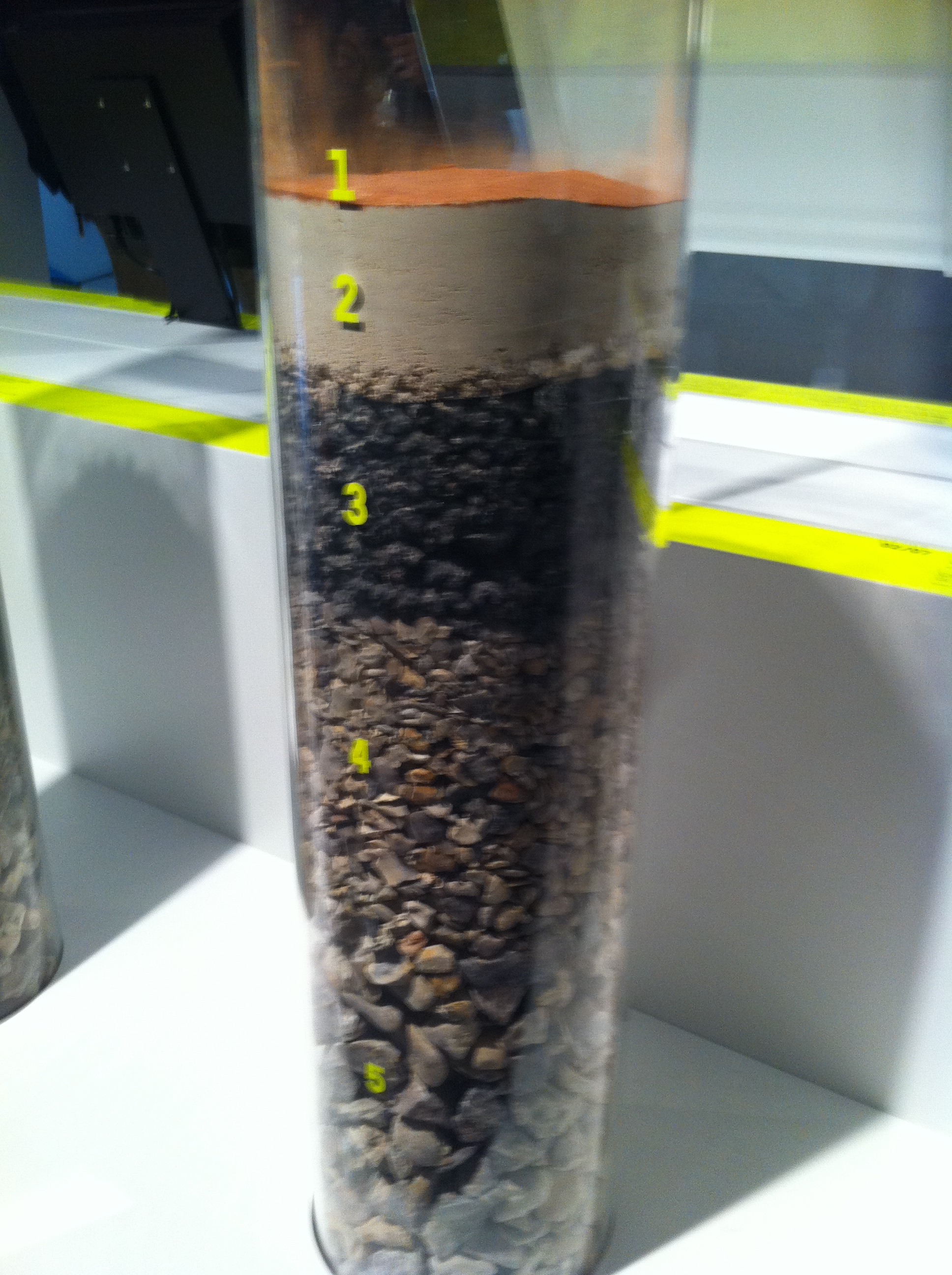
The five different layers composing the clay courts

=== Composition of the clay courts ===
1. Red clay dust.
2. Crushed limestone.
3. Clinker (coal aggregate).
4. Crushed gravel.
5. Drain rock fragments.

== Trophies ==
The trophies have been awarded to the winners since 1953 and are manufactured by Mellerio dits Meller, a famous Parisian jewelry house. They are all made of pure silver with finely etched decorations on their side. Each new singles winner gets their name written on the base of the trophy. Winners receive custom-made pure silver replicas of the trophies they have won. They are usually presented by the president of the French Tennis Federation (FFT).

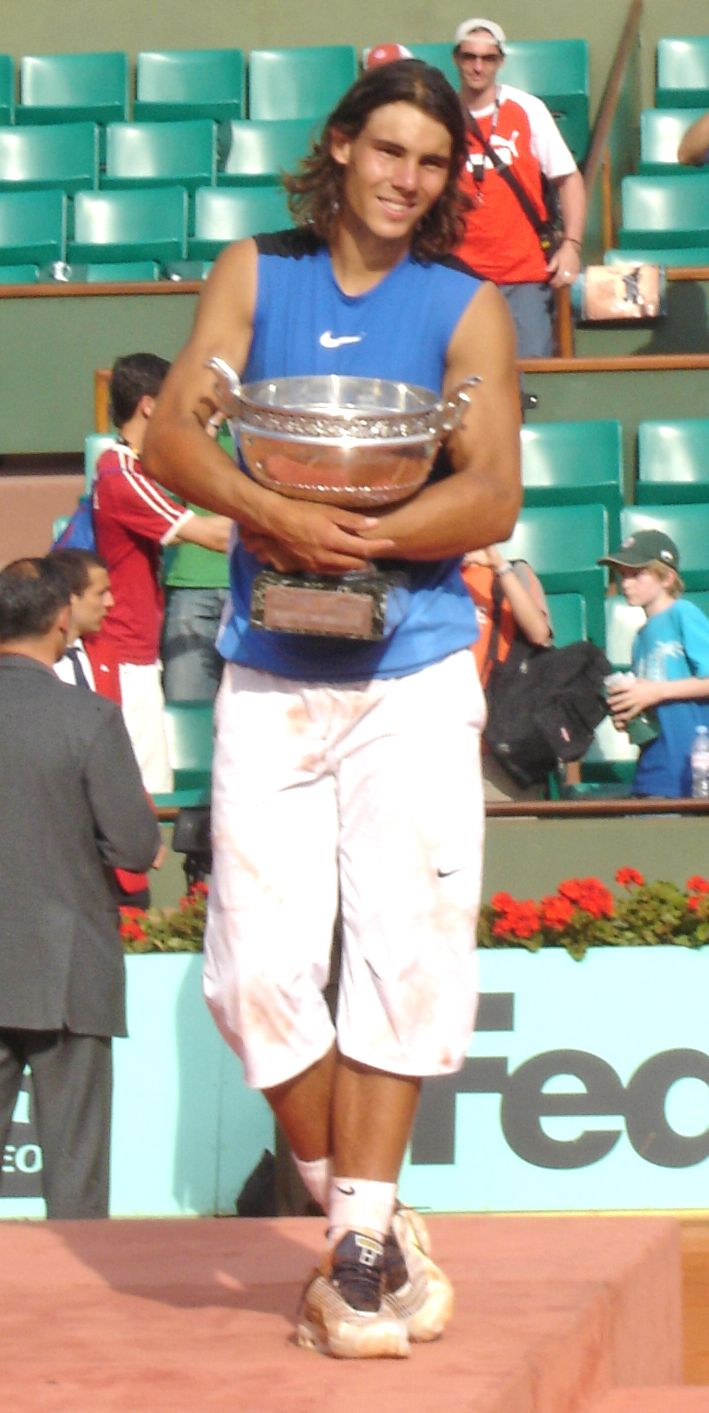
Rafael Nadal holding the Coupe des Mousquetaires in 2006

The trophy awarded to the winner of the men's singles is called the Coupe des Mousquetaires (The Musketeers' Cup). It is named in honor of the "Four Musketeers". The trophy weighs 14 kg, is 40 cm high and 19 cm wide. The current design was created in 1981 by the Mellerio dit Meller. Each winner gets a smaller-size replica and the original remains property of the FFT at all times.

The trophy awarded to the winner of the women's singles is called the Coupe Suzanne Lenglen (Suzanne Lenglen Cup) since 1979. The current cup was awarded for the first time in 1986. It is, with a few details, a replica of a cup offered at the time by the city of Nice to Suzanne Lenglen. This trophy, donated by Suzanne Lenglen's family to the Musée National du Sport, was awarded between 1979 and 1985 to every winner until the FFT made a copy. Each winner receives a smaller-size replica and the original remains property of the FFT at all times.

== Prize money and ranking points ==
=== Prize money ===
For 2025, the prize money pool was announced to be €56.352 million, an increase of 5.37% compared to the prize pool for 2024 edition.

| Event | Winner | Finalist | Semifinals | Quarterfinals | Round of 16 | Round of 32 | Round of 64 | Round of 128 | Q3 | Q2 | Q1 |
| Singles | €2,550,000 | €1,275,000 | €690,000 | €440,000 | €265,000 | €168,000 | €117,000 | €78,000 | €43,000 | €29,500 | €21,000 |
| Doubles^{1} | €590,000 | €295,000 | €148,000 | €80,000 | €43,500 | €27,500 | €17,500 | —N/a | —N/a | —N/a | —N/a |
| Mixed doubles^{1} | €122,000 | €61,000 | €31,000 | €17,500 | €10,000 | €5,000 | —N/a | —N/a | —N/a | —N/a | —N/a |
| Wheelchair singles | €63,900 | €31,950 | €20,600 | €12,360 | €8,750 | —N/a | —N/a | —N/a | —N/a | —N/a | —N/a |
| Wheelchair doubles^{1} | €21,650 | €11,350 | €8,250 | €5,150 | —N/a | —N/a | —N/a | —N/a | —N/a | —N/a | —N/a |
| Quad wheelchair singles | €63,900 | €31,950 | €20,600 | €12,360 | —N/a | —N/a | —N/a | —N/a | —N/a | —N/a | —N/a |
| Quad wheelchair doubles^{1} | €21,650 | €11,350 | €8,250 | —N/a | —N/a | —N/a | —N/a | —N/a | —N/a | —N/a | —N/a |

- ^{1} Prize money for doubles is per team.

=== Ranking points ===
Men and women often receive point values based on the rules of their respective tours.

==== Senior points ====
| Event | W | F | SF | QF | Round of 16 | Round of 32 | Round of 64 | Round of 128 | Q | Q3 | Q2 | Q1 |
| Men's singles | 2000 | 1300 | 800 | 400 | 200 | 100 | 50 | 10 | 25 | 16 | 8 | 0 |
| Men's doubles | 2000 | 1300 | 800 | 400 | 200 | 100 | 0 | —N/a | —N/a | —N/a | —N/a | —N/a |
| Women's singles | 2000 | 1300 | 780 | 430 | 240 | 130 | 70 | 10 | 40 | 30 | 20 | 2 |
| Women's doubles | 2000 | 1300 | 780 | 430 | 240 | 130 | 10 | —N/a | —N/a | —N/a | —N/a | —N/a |

==== Wheelchair points ====
| Event | W | F | SF/3rd | QF/4th |
| Singles | 800 | 500 | 375 | 100 |
| Doubles | 800 | 500 | 100 | —N/a |
| Quad singles | 800 | 500 | 100 | —N/a |
| Quad doubles | 800 | 100 | —N/a | —N/a |

==== Junior points ====
| Event | W | F | SF | QF | Round of 16 | Round of 32 | Q | Q3 |
| Boys' singles | 1000 | 600 | 370 | 200 | 100 | 45 | 30 | 20 |
| Girls' singles | 1000 | 600 | 370 | 200 | 100 | 45 | 30 | 20 |
| Boys' doubles | 750 | 450 | 275 | 150 | 75 | —N/a | —N/a | —N/a |
| Girls' doubles | 750 | 450 | 275 | 150 | 75 | —N/a | —N/a | —N/a |

== Champions ==
=== Former champions ===
- Men's singles, winners of the Coupe des Mousquetaires. (Note: Last men's singles champion from France: Yannick Noah (1983).)
- Women's singles, winners of the Coupe Suzanne Lenglen. (Note: Last wWomen's singles champion from France: Mary Pierce (2000).)
- Men's doubles, winners of the Coupe Jacques Brugnon.
- Women's doubles, winners of the Coupe Simone Mathieu.
- Mixed doubles, winners of the Coupe Marcel Bernard.
- All champions

=== Current champions ===
2026 French Open
Alexander Zverev, the 2026 men's singles champion

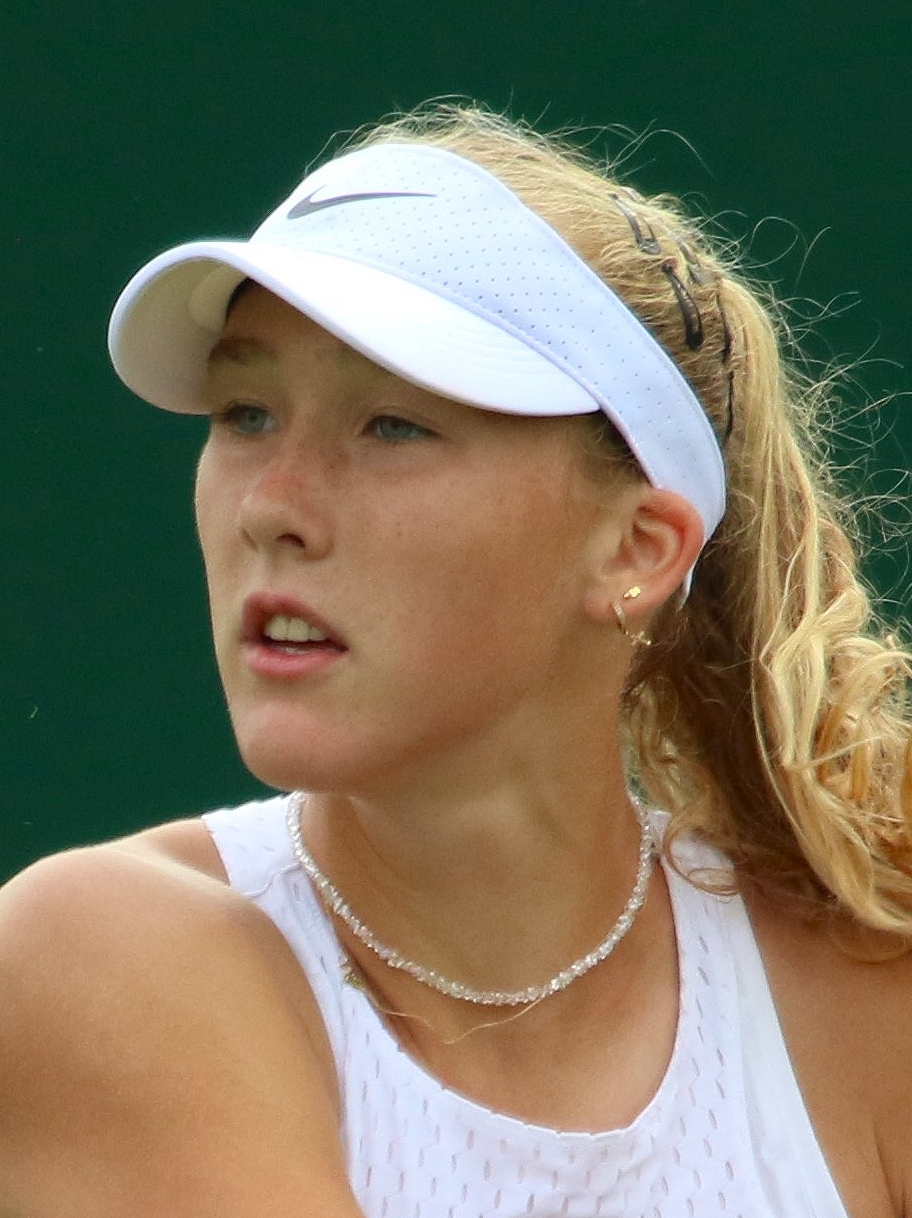
Mirra Andreeva, the 2026 women's singles champion

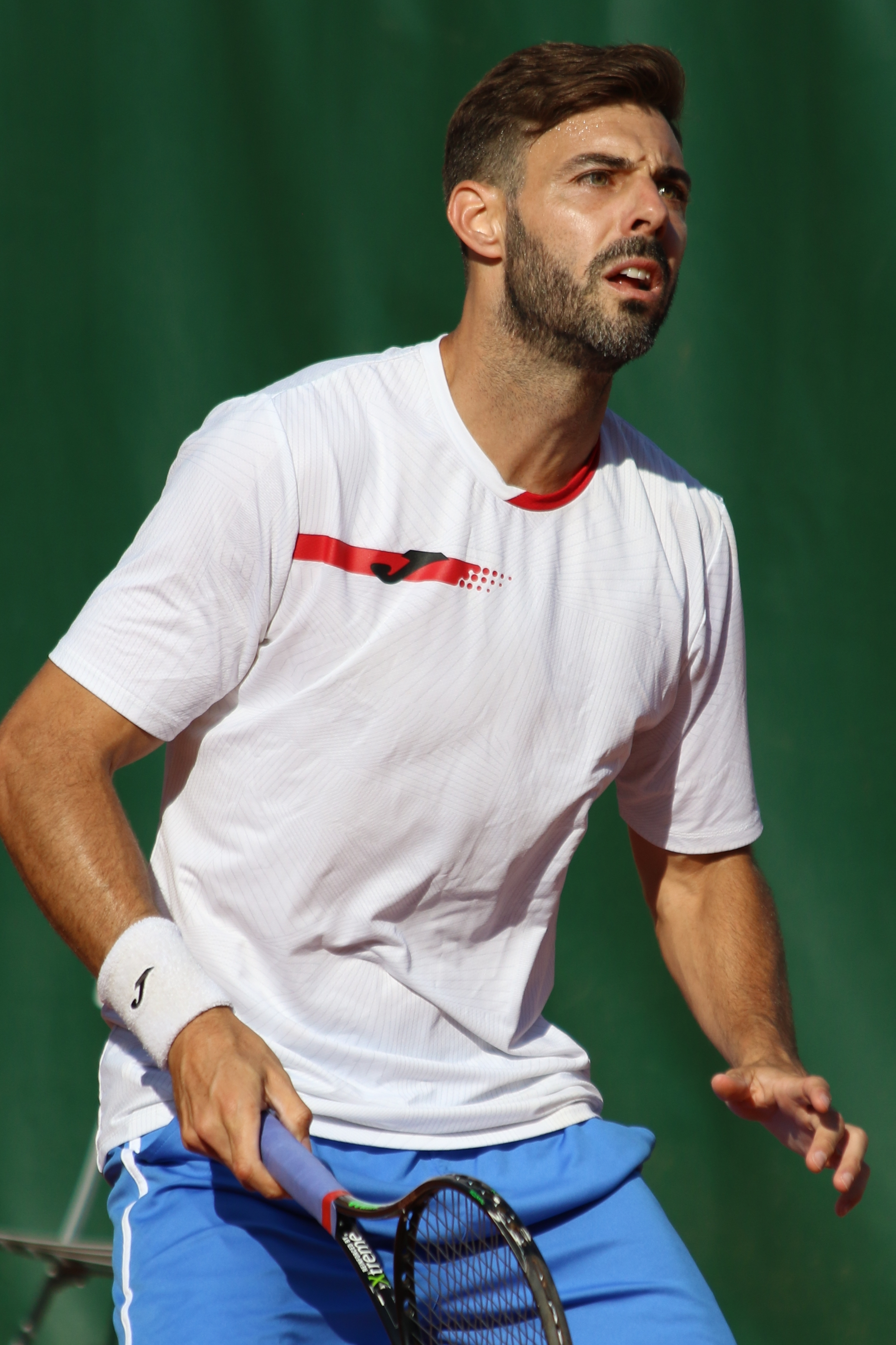
Marcel Granollers was part of the winning men's doubles team in 2026.

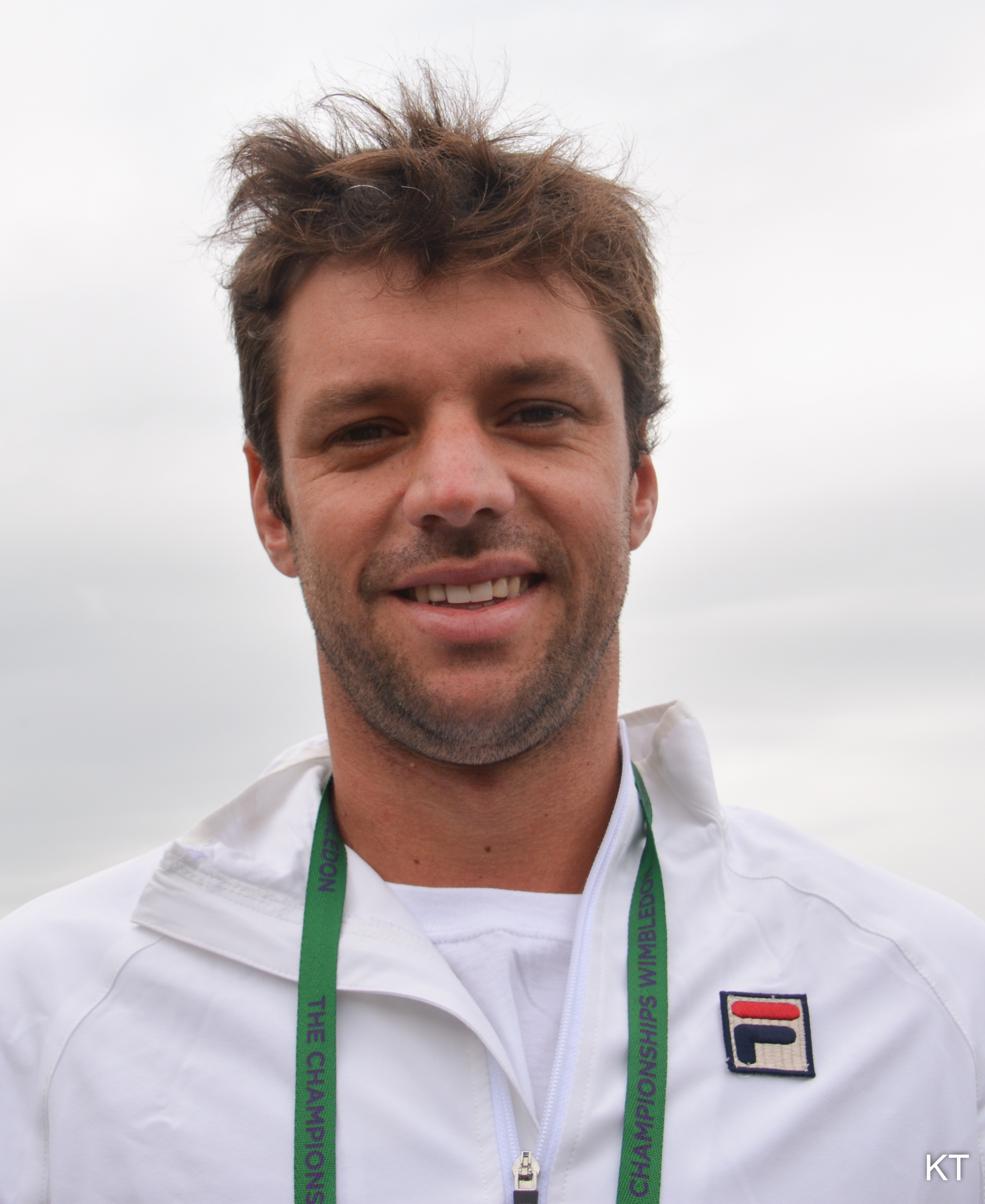
Horacio Zeballos was part of the winning men's doubles team in 2026.

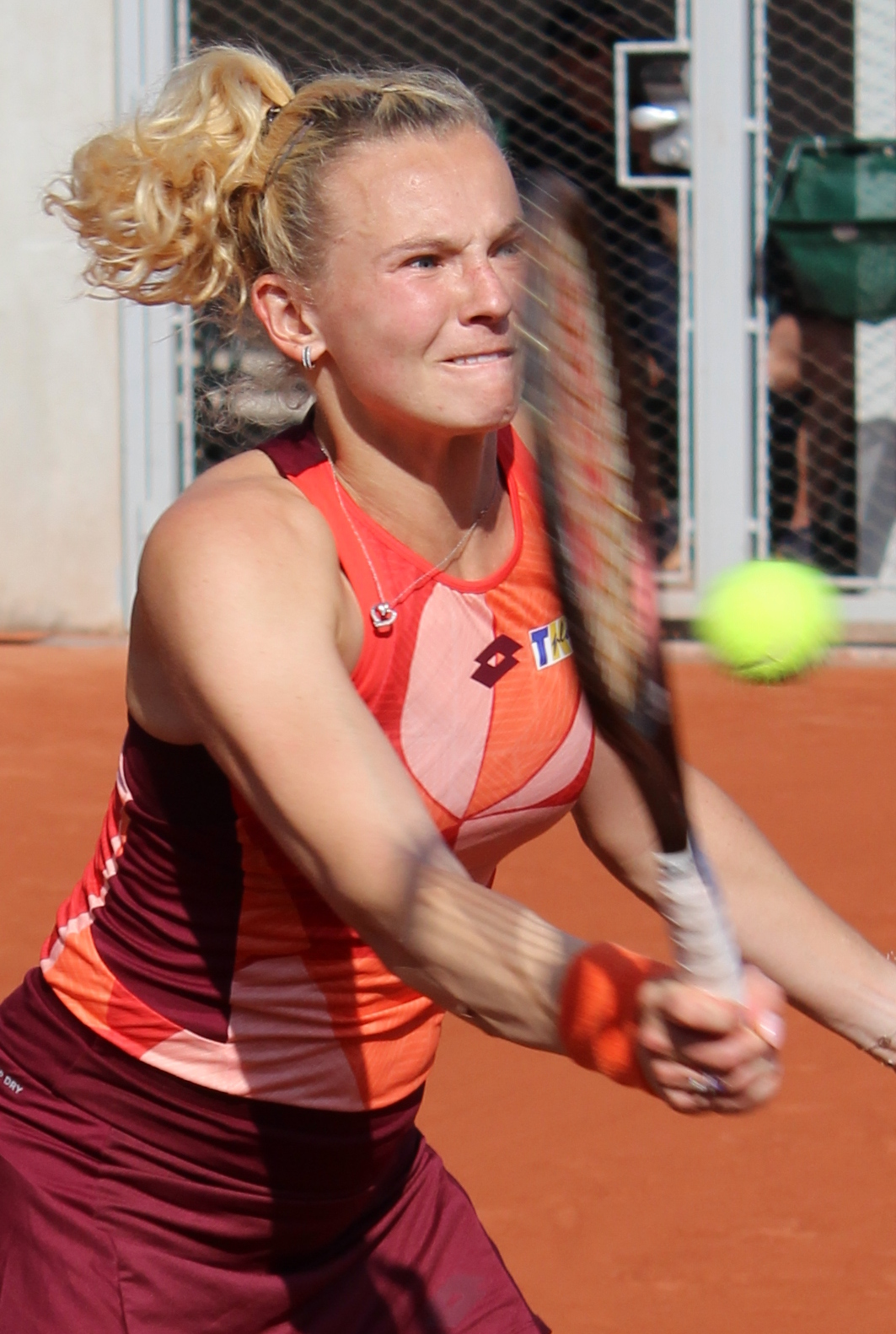
Kateřina Siniaková was part of the winning women's doubles team in 2026.

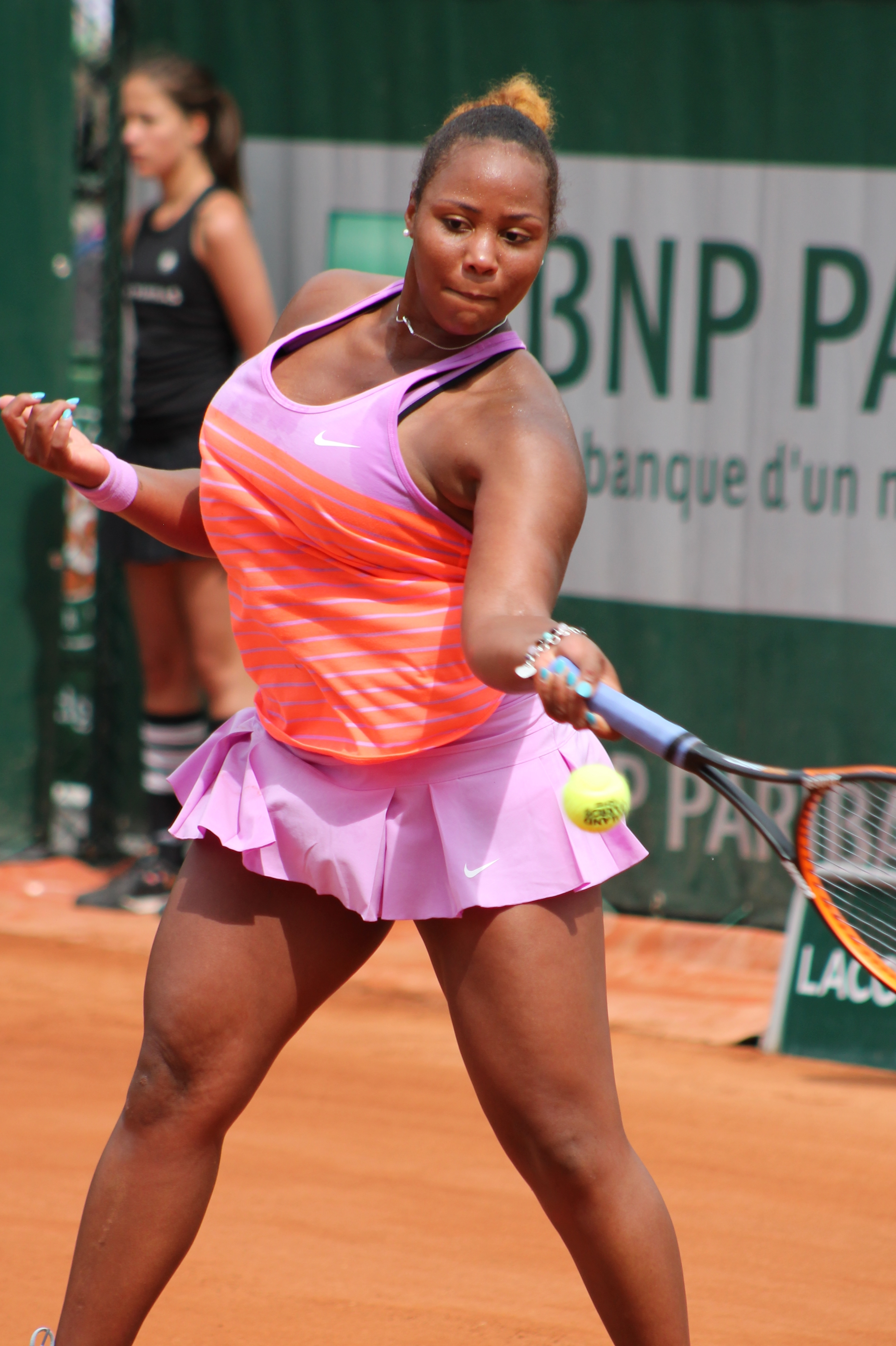
Taylor Townsend was part of the winning women's doubles team in 2026.

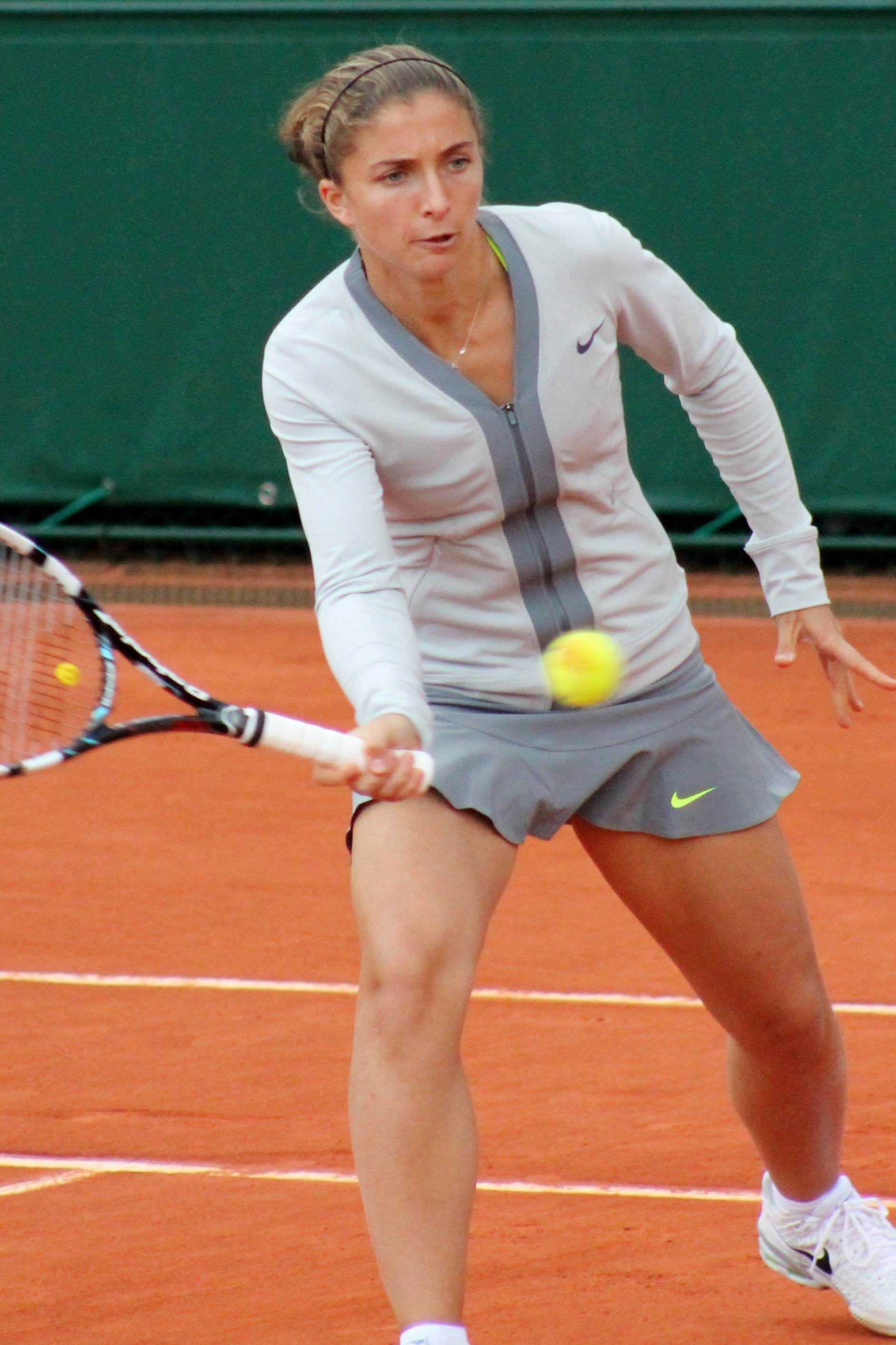
Sara Errani was part of the winning mixed doubles team in 2026.

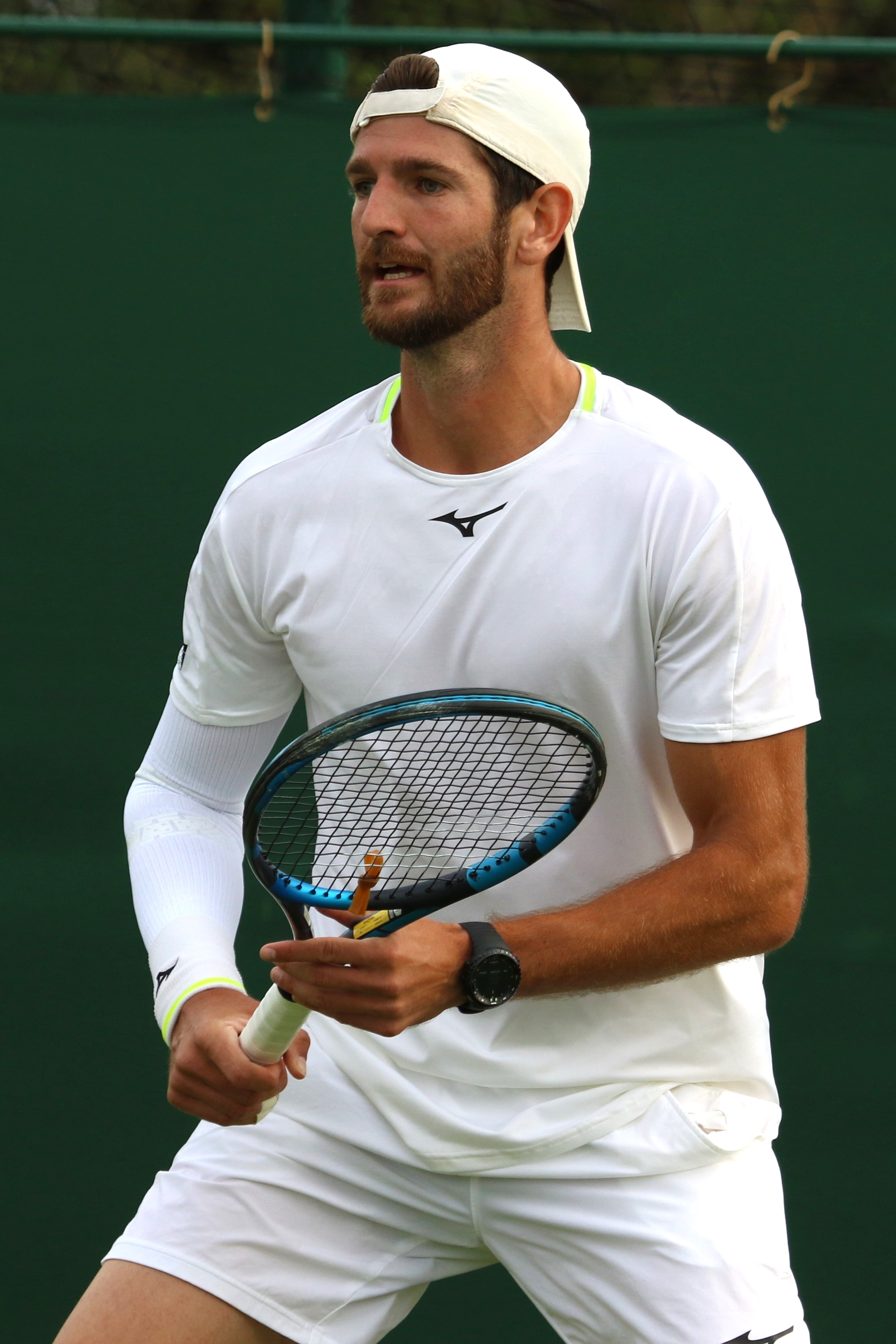
Andrea Vavassori was part of the winning mixed doubles team in 2026.

=== Most recent finals ===
| 2026 event | Champion | Runner-up | Score |
|---|---|---|---|
| Men's singles | (Germany) Alexander Zverev | (Italy) Flavio Cobolli | 6–1, 4–6, 6–4, 6–7^{(5–7)}, 6–1 |
| Women's singles | Mirra Andreeva | (Poland) Maja Chwalińska | 6–3, 6–2 |
| Men's doubles | (Spain) Marcel Granollers (Argentina) Horacio Zeballos | (Finland) Harri Heliövaara (United Kingdom) Henry Patten | 6–4, 6–2 |
| Women's doubles | (Czech Republic) Kateřina Siniaková (United States) Taylor Townsend | (Kazakhstan) Anna Danilina (Serbia) Aleksandra Krunić | 6–2, 7–5 |
| Mixed doubles | (Italy) Sara Errani (Italy) Andrea Vavassori | (Canada) Gabriela Dabrowski (United States) Evan King | 4–6, 6–3, [10–4] |

== Records ==
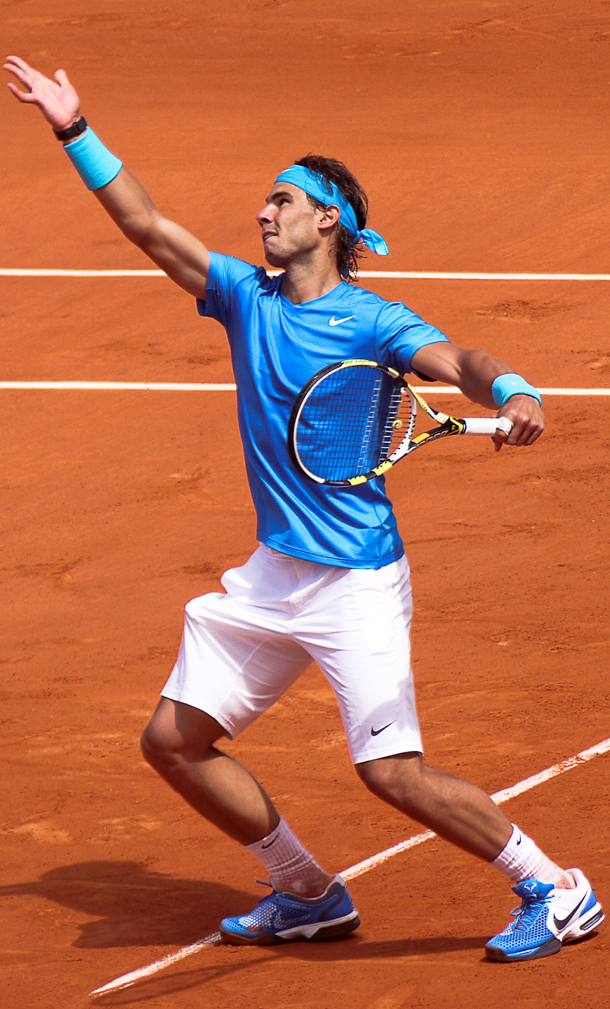
Rafael Nadal, the all-time record holder in men's singles

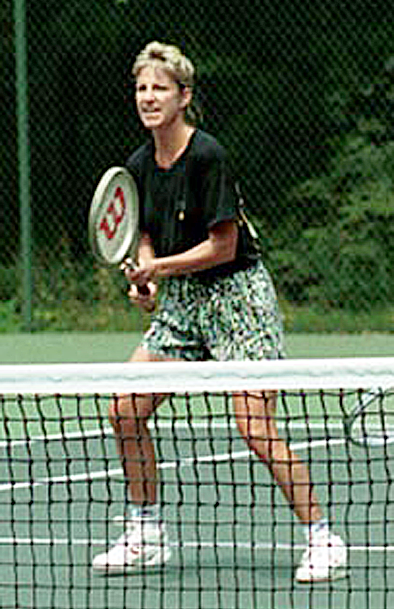
Chris Evert, the all-time record holder in women's singles

| Record | Era | Player(s) | Count | Years |
|---|---|---|---|---|
Men since 1891
| Most singles titles | Open Era | (Spain) Rafael Nadal | 14 | 2005–2008, 2010–2014, 2017–2020, 2022 |
| Most singles titles | Amateur Era | (France) Henri Cochet | 4 | 1926, 1928, 1930, 1932 ● World Hard Court Championships: 1922 |
| Most singles titles | French Championships* | (France) Max Decugis | 8 | 1903–1904, 1907–1909, 1912–1914 |
| Most consecutive singles titles | Open Era | (Spain) Rafael Nadal | 5 | 2010–2014 |
| Most consecutive singles titles | Amateur Era | (United States) Frank Parker (Egypt) Jaroslav Drobný (United States) Tony Trabert (Italy) Nicola Pietrangeli | 2 | 1948–1949; 1951–1952; 1954–1955; 1959–1960 |
| Most consecutive singles titles | French Championships* | (France) Paul Aymé | 4 | 1897–1900 |
| Most doubles titles | Open Era | (Canada) Daniel Nestor (Belarus) Max Mirnyi | 4 | 2007 with Mark Knowles, 2010 with Nenad Zimonjić, 2011, 2012 with Max Mirnyi. 2005, 2006 with Jonas Björkman, 2011, 2012 with Daniel Nestor. |
| Most doubles titles | Amateur Era | (Australia) Roy Emerson | 6 | 1960, 1962 with Neale Fraser, 1961 with Rod Laver, 1963 with Manuel Santana, 1964 with Ken Fletcher, 1965 with Fred Stolle. |
| Most doubles titles | French Championships* | (France) Max Decugis | 13 | 1902–1909, 1911–1914, 1920 |
| Most consecutive doubles titles | Open Era | (Canada) Daniel Nestor | 3 | 2010–2012 |
| Most consecutive doubles titles | Amateur Era | (Australia) Roy Emerson | 6 | 1960–1965 |
| Most consecutive doubles titles | French Championships* | (France) Maurice Germot | 10 | 1906–1914, 1920 |
| Most mixed doubles titles | Open Era | (France) Jean-Claude Barclay | 3 | 1968, 1971, 1973 with Françoise Dürr. |
| Most mixed doubles titles | Amateur Era | (Australia) Ken Fletcher | 3 | 1963–1965 with Margaret Court. |
| Most mixed doubles titles | French Championships* | (France) Max Decugis | 7 | 1904–1906, 1908–1909, 1914 and 1920 with Suzanne Lenglen. |
| Most Championships (singles, doubles & mixed doubles) | Open Era | (Spain) Rafael Nadal | 14 | 2005–2008, 2010–2014, 2017–2020, 2022 (14 singles) |
| Most Championships (singles, doubles & mixed doubles) | French Championships* | (France) Max Decugis | 28 | 1902–1920 (8 singles, 13 doubles, 7 mixed) |
Women since 1897
| Most singles titles | Open Era | (United States) Chris Evert | 7 | 1974–1975, 1979–1980, 1983, 1985–1986 |
| Most singles titles | French Championships* | (France) Suzanne Lenglen | 6 | 1920–1923, 1925–1926 ● World Hard Court Championships: 1914, 1921–23 |
| Most consecutive singles titles | Open Era | (Socialist Federal Republic of Yugoslavia) Monica Seles (Belgium) Justine Henin (Poland) Iga Świątek | 3 | 1990–1992; 2005–2007; 2022–2024 |
| Most consecutive singles titles | French Championships* | (France) Jeanne Matthey (France) Suzanne Lenglen | 4 | 1909–1912; 1920–1923 |
| Most doubles titles | Open Era | (Czech Republic) / (United States) Martina Navratilova | 7 | 1975 with Chris Evert, 1982 with Anne Smith, 1984–1985, 1987, 1988 with Pam Shriver, 1986 with Andrea Temesvári. |
| Most doubles titles | French Championships* | (France) Simonne Mathieu | 6 | 1933, 1934 with Elizabeth Ryan, 1936–1937, 1938 with Billie Yorke, 1939 with Jadwiga Jędrzejowska. |
| Most consecutive doubles titles | Open Era | (United States) Martina Navratilova (United States) Gigi Fernández | 5 | 1984–1985, 1987–1988 with Pam Shriver, 1986 with Andrea Temesvári. 1991 with Jana Novotná, 1992–95 with Natasha Zvereva. |
| Most consecutive doubles titles | French Championships* | (France) Françoise Dürr | 5 | 1967–1971 |
| Most mixed doubles titles | Open Era | (France) Françoise Dürr | 3 | 1968, 1971, 1973 with Jean-Claude Barclay. |
| Most mixed doubles titles | French Championships* | (France) Suzanne Lenglen | 7 | 1914, 1920 with Max Decugis, 1921–1923, 1925, 1926 with Jacques Brugnon. |
| Most Championships (singles, doubles & mixed doubles) | Open Era | (Czech Republic) / (United States) Martina Navratilova | 11 | 1974–1988 (2 singles, 7 doubles, 2 mixed) |
| Most Championships (singles, doubles & mixed doubles) | French Championships* | (France) Suzanne Lenglen | 15 | 1919–1926 (6 singles, 2 doubles, 7 mixed) |
Wheelchair: singles and doubles since 2007, quads since 2019
| Most singles titles | Men | (Japan) Shingo Kunieda | 8 | 2007–2010, 2014, 2015, 2018, 2022 |
| Most singles titles | Women | (Netherlands) Esther Vergeer (Netherlands) Diede de Groot | 6 | 2007–2012; 2019, 2021–2024, 2026 |
| Most singles titles | Quads | (Australia) Dylan Alcott (Netherlands) Niels Vink | 3 | 2019–2021; 2022, 2023, 2026 |
| Most consecutive singles titles | Men | (Japan) Shingo Kunieda | 4 | 2007–2010 |
| Most consecutive singles titles | Women | (Netherlands) Esther Vergeer | 6 | 2006–2009 |
| Most consecutive singles titles | Quads | (Australia) Dylan Alcott | 3 | 2019–2021 |
| Most doubles titles | Men | (Japan) Shingo Kunieda | 8 | 2007–2011, 2013–2015 |
| Most doubles titles | Women | (Netherlands) Aniek van Koot | 9 | 2010, 2013, 2015, 2018–2022, 2024 |
| Most doubles titles | Quads | (Netherlands) Niels Vink | 4 | 2022, 2024–2026 |
| Most consecutive doubles titles | Men | (United Kingdom) Alfie Hewett (United Kingdom) Gordon Reid | 7 | 2020–2026; 2020–2026 |
| Most consecutive doubles titles | Women | (Netherlands) Diede de Groot (Netherlands) Aniek van Koot | 5 | 2018–2022; 2018–2022 |
| Most consecutive doubles titles | Quads | (United States) David Wagner (Netherlands) Niels Vink | 3 | 2019–2022; 2024–2026 |
Miscellaneous
| Unseeded champions | Men | (Sweden) Mats Wilander (Brazil) Gustavo Kuerten (Argentina) Gastón Gaudio | 1982; 1997; 2004 | |
| Unseeded champions | Women | (United Kingdom) Margaret Scriven (Latvia) Jeļena Ostapenko (Poland) Iga Świątek (Czech Republic) Barbora Krejčíková | 1933; 2017; 2020; 2021 | |
| Youngest singles champion | Men | (United States) Michael Chang | 17 years and 3 months (1989) | |
| Youngest singles champion | Women | (Socialist Federal Republic of Yugoslavia) Monica Seles | 16 years and 6 months (1990) | |
| Oldest singles champion | Men | (Serbia) Novak Djokovic | 36 years and 20 days (2023) | |
| Oldest singles champion | Women | (Hungary) Zsuzsa Körmöczy | 33 years and 10 months (1958) | |

- French Championships (1891–1924) was only open to French clubs' members. In 1925, it opened to international players, and was later renamed the French Open in 1968, when it allowed professionals to compete with amateurs. See WHCC.

== Media coverage and broadcasting ==
=== France ===
France Télévisions and Amazon Prime Video hold the broadcast rights to the French Open until 2027. All 11 "night sessions" will remain exclusive to Prime Video. Studio presentation for the French Open on France Télévisions is historically hosted on a terrace in a corner of the Court Philippe Chatrier.

=== United States ===
NBC's coverage of the French Open began in 1975. In 2007, Tennis Channel acquired the pay television rights to the tournament and sub-licensed coverage of morning window (U.S. time) matches to ESPN for broadcast by ESPN2 from 2007 through 2015. In August 2015, ESPN announced that it would discontinue its sub-licensing and drop coverage of the French Open beginning in 2016, with network staff citing that because of the structure of the arrangement, its coverage "did not fit our successful model at the other three Majors"—where ESPN is the exclusive rightsholder. Rather than find another partner to sub-license coverage to, Tennis Channel chose to retain the rights under its new owner Sinclair Broadcast Group, nearly doubling the amount of Tennis Channel's coverage.

Starting with the 2023 edition and continuing the following year, NBC moved some of its coverage of the French Open exclusively to its streaming service, Peacock.

In June 2024, it was reported that the U.S. rights had been acquired by TNT Sports beginning in 2025, as part of a deal worth $650 million over 10 years with Warner Bros. Discovery, and a renewal of its pan-European rights with Eurosport. Matches air primarily on TNT, with TruTV providing a daily multiplex. Full coverage is available via streaming on HBO Max, and replays on Discovery+.

=== United Kingdom ===
BBC began broadcasting French Open finals annually in 1981 (often in their Grandstand or Sunday Grandstand programmes). The BBC's coverage continued until 2011. From 2012 until 2021, ITV4 televised the French Open in the United Kingdom. Eurosport began broadcasting the tournament in 1989. As of 2022, Eurosport (later as TNT Sports starting from 2025) holds exclusive UK broadcast rights to the tournament. Studio presentation for the French Open on Eurosport is hosted by Barbara Schett with Mats Wilander. Commentators include Simon Reed, Chris Bradnam, Nick Lester, Barry Millns alongside Jo Durie, Annabel Croft, Frew McMillan, Miles Maclagan, Arvind Parmar and Chris Wilkinson.

=== India ===
Star Sports had the exclusive broadcast rights of the French Open, up until the 2021 edition. Starting 2022, Sony Pictures Sports Network, owned by Sony Pictures Networks India, acquired the broadcast rights through 2024. The deal was extended in May 2025 for three more editions, until 2027.

=== Europe ===
Excluding France, the tournament is broadcast on Eurosport in more than 50 territories, until 2030.

== Ball boys and ball girls ==
Every year, 280 "ramasseurs de balles" (literally "gatherers of balls" in English) are scheduled to be selected for the tournament.

Aged between 11 and 16 years old and dressed in matching Lacoste shirts and shorts, the ball boys and ball girls are chosen to take part in the French Open through an application process, only available to those licensed of the French Tennis Federation, which in 2023 had approximately 4,000 applicants from across France. Upon selection they are trained in the weeks leading up to the event.

== See also ==
Lists of champions

- List of French Open champions (all events)
  - List of French Open men's singles champions
  - List of French Open women's singles champions
  - List of French Open men's doubles champions
  - List of French Open women's doubles champions
  - List of French Open mixed doubles champions
- List of French Open singles finalists during the Open Era, records and statistics

Other Grand Slam tournaments

- Australian Open
- Wimbledon
- US Open

== Notes ==
| Preceded by Australian Open | Grand Slam Tournament; May–June | Succeeded by Wimbledon |
