= P. Baigneres =

French tennis player

P. Baigneres (given name unknown) was a tennis player competing for France. He finished runner-up to H. Briggs in the singles event of the inaugural Amateur French Championships in 1891.

== Grand Slam finals ==
=== Singles: (1 runner-up) ===
Result	Year	Championship	Surface	Opponent	Score
Loss	1891	French Championships	Clay (Sand)	(United Kingdom) H. Briggs	3–6, 2–6
