= H. Briggs =

British tennis player

H. Briggs (given name unknown) was a British tennis player residing in Paris, France.

Briggs won the singles event of the inaugural Amateur French Championships in 1891 which took place on the grounds of the Cercle des Sport de l'Île de Puteaux. In the final he defeated P. Baigneres in straight sets. As a member of the Club Stade Français, he was entitled to participate in the tournament, which until 1925 was open only to tennis players who were members of French clubs.

== Grand Slam finals ==
=== Singles: (1 title) ===
Result	Year	Championship	Surface	Opponent	Score
Win	1891	French Championships	Clay	(France) P. Baigneres	6–3, 6–2
