= List of Grand Slam women's singles champions =

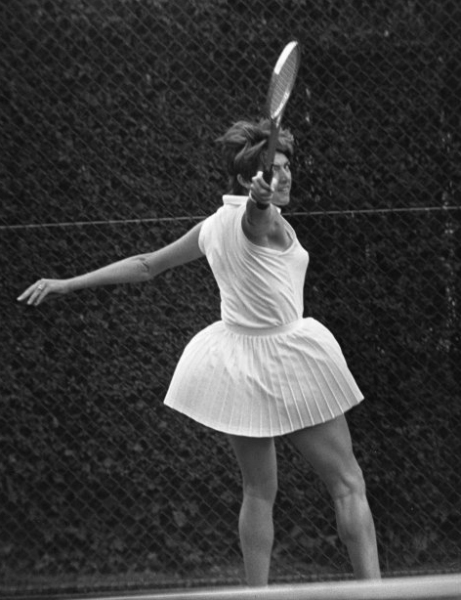
Margaret Court has 24 singles majors, an all-time record. In 1970, Court became the first woman during the Open Era to win the Grand Slam in singles.

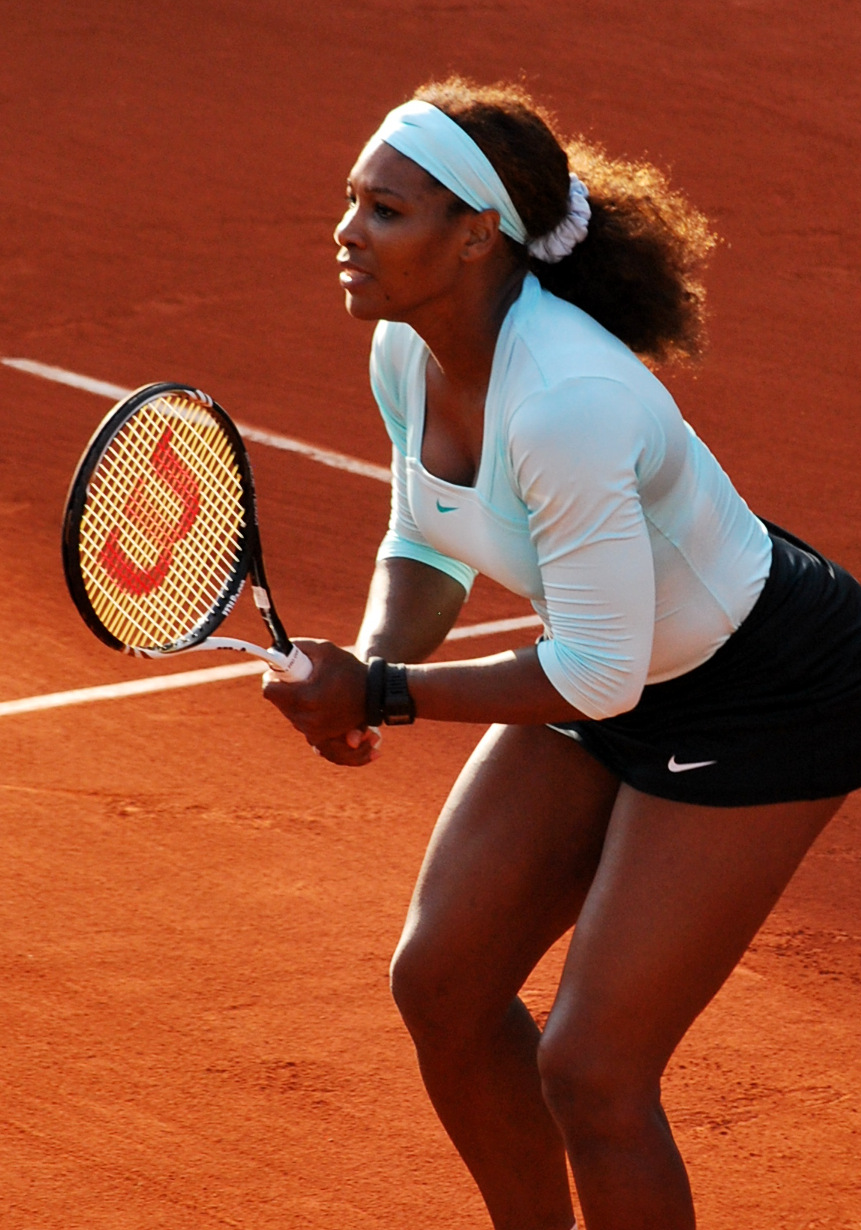
Serena Williams is the winner of 23 major singles titles, most in the Open Era.

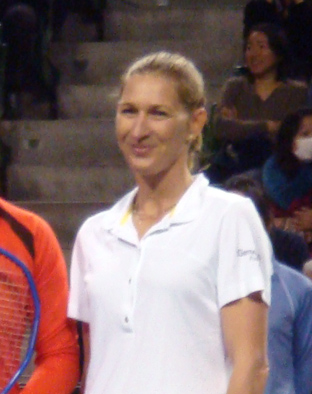
Steffi Graf – winner of 22 major singles titles, and the only person to win the Golden Slam (1988).

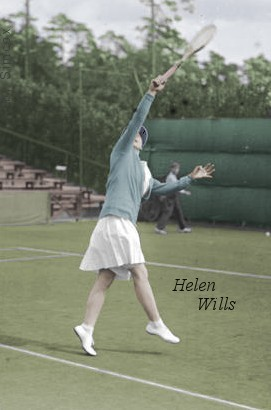
Helen Wills Moody – winner of 19 major titles, the first woman to win more than 10 titles.

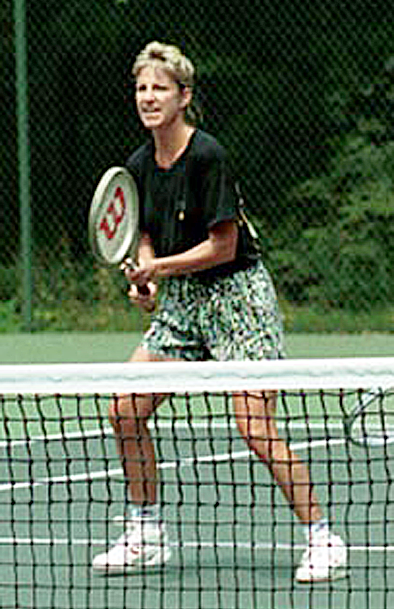
Chris Evert has won 18 major titles, tied for the fifth most with Martina Navratilova.

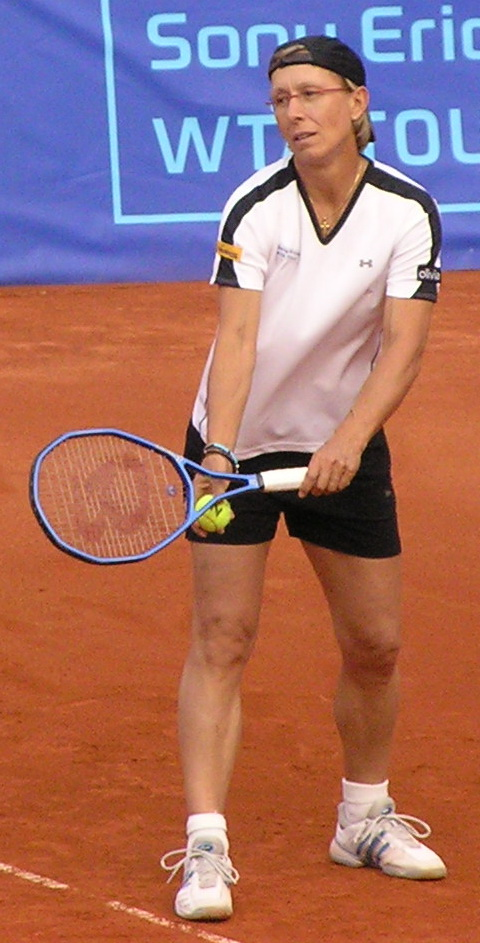
Martina Navratilova has won 18 major titles, tied for the fifth most with Chris Evert.

This article details the list of women's singles Grand Slam tournaments tennis champions. Some major changes have taken place in history and have affected the number of titles that have been won by various players. These have included the opening of the French national championships to international players in 1925, the elimination of the challenge round in 1922, and the admission of professional players in 1968 (the start of the Open Era). Since then, 63 women have won at least one grand slam.

All of these tournaments have been listed based on the modern definition of a tennis major, rather than when they were officially recognized by the ILTF. The Australian, French Championships, and U.S. tournaments were officially recognized by the ILTF in 1924, though the French Championships were not played in 1924 because of the Olympics. The United States Lawn Tennis Association (USLTA) had several grievances with the ILTF and refused to join when it was formed in 1913.

From 1913 to 1923 there were three official championships recognized by the ILTF:

- World Grass Court Championships – Wimbledon.
- World Hard Court Championships, held in Paris on clay courts.
- World Covered Court Championships, held in Europe on an indoor wood surface.

During that same time period the USLTA recognized the U.S. National Championships and did not recognize any world championship.

- U.S. National Championships, held in New York on grass.

== Champions by year ==
* French club members or citizens only, thus not yet a Grand Slam tournament (until 1925 when the tournament opened itself to international competitors after merging with the World Hard Court Championships).
† Tournaments held during German occupation not recognized by Fédération Française de Tennis.
$ French Open held in 1946 and 1947 after Wimbledon due to the aftermath of World War II.
‡ Australian Open held in December from 1977 through 1985, then moved back to January (skipped one calendar year in order to arrange that).
◊ 2020 French Open held in September (as the last Grand Slam tournament of the year) due to the COVID-19 pandemic.

| class="col-break " style=" padding-left: 1em;" |

Tournament surface
| AU | Hard (1988–Present); Grass (1905–1987) |
| FR | Clay (1908–present); Sand (1892–1907); Grass (1891) |
| WB | Grass |
| US | Hard (1978–Present); Clay (1975–1977); Grass (1881–1974) |
Flag Icon Key
List of National Flags

| Year | Australian Open | French Open | Wimbledon | US Open |
|---|---|---|---|---|
| 1884 | started in 1922 | started in 1897 | (United Kingdom) Maud Watson (1/2) | started in 1887 |
| 1885 | tournament not created | tournament not created | (United Kingdom) Maud Watson (2/2) | tournament not created |
| 1886 | tournament not created | tournament not created | (United Kingdom) Blanche Bingley Hillyard (1/6) | tournament not created |
| 1887 | tournament not created | tournament not created | (United Kingdom) Lottie Dod (1/5) | (United States) Ellen Hansell (1/1) |
| 1888 | tournament not created | tournament not created | (United Kingdom) Lottie Dod (2/5) | (United States) Bertha Townsend (1/2) |
| 1889 | tournament not created | tournament not created | (United Kingdom) Blanche Bingley Hillyard (2/6) | (United States) Bertha Townsend (2/2) |
| 1890 | tournament not created | tournament not created | (United Kingdom of Great Britain and Ireland) Helen Rice (1/1) | (United States) Ellen Roosevelt (1/1) |
| 1891 | tournament not created | tournament not created | (United Kingdom) Lottie Dod (3/5) | (United Kingdom) Mabel Cahill (1/2) |
| 1892 | tournament not created | tournament not created | (United Kingdom) Lottie Dod (4/5) | (United Kingdom) Mabel Cahill (2/2) |
| 1893 | tournament not created | tournament not created | (United Kingdom) Lottie Dod (5/5) | (United States) Aline Terry (1/1) |
| 1894 | tournament not created | tournament not created | (United Kingdom) Blanche Bingley Hillyard (3/6) | (United States) Helen Hellwig (1/1) |
| 1895 | tournament not created | tournament not created | (United Kingdom) Charlotte Cooper Sterry (1/5) | (United States) Juliette Atkinson (1/3) |
| 1896 | tournament not created | tournament not created | (United Kingdom) Charlotte Cooper Sterry (2/5) | (United States) Elisabeth Moore (1/4) |
| 1897 | tournament not created | (France) Adine Masson * | (United Kingdom) Blanche Bingley Hillyard (4/6) | (United States) Juliette Atkinson (2/3) |
| 1898 | tournament not created | (France) Adine Masson * | (United Kingdom) Charlotte Cooper Sterry (3/5) | (United States) Juliette Atkinson (3/3) |
| 1899 | tournament not created | (France) Adine Masson * | (United Kingdom) Blanche Bingley Hillyard (5/6) | (United States) Marion Jones (1/2) |
| 1900 | tournament not created | (France) Yvonne Prévost * | (United Kingdom) Blanche Bingley Hillyard (6/6) | (United States) Myrtle McAteer (1/1) |
| 1901 | tournament not created | (France) Suzanne Girod * | (United Kingdom) Charlotte Cooper Sterry (4/5) | (United States) Elisabeth Moore (2/4) |
| 1902 | tournament not created | (France) Adine Masson * | (United Kingdom) Muriel Robb (1/1) | (United States) Marion Jones (2/2) |
| 1903 | tournament not created | (France) Adine Masson * | (United Kingdom) Dorothea Douglass Lambert Chambers (1/7) | (United States) Elisabeth Moore (3/4) |
| 1904 | tournament not created | (France) Kate Gillou * | (United Kingdom) Dorothea Douglass Lambert Chambers (2/7) | (United States) May Sutton Bundy (1/3) |
| 1905 | tournament not created | (France) Kate Gillou * | (United States) May Sutton Bundy (2/3) | (United States) Elisabeth Moore (4/4) |
| 1906 | tournament not created | (France) Kate Gillou-Fenwick * | (United Kingdom) Dorothea Douglass Lambert Chambers (3/7) | (United States) Helen Homans (1/1) |
| 1907 | tournament not created | (France) Comtesse de Kermel * | (United States) May Sutton Bundy (3/3) | (United States) Evelyn Sears (1/1) |
| 1908 | tournament not created | (France) Kate Gillou-Fenwick * | (United Kingdom) Charlotte Cooper Sterry (5/5) | (United States) Maud Barger-Wallach (1/1) |
| 1909 | tournament not created | (France) Jeanne Matthey * | (United Kingdom) Dora Boothby (1/1) | (United States) Hazel Hotchkiss Wightman (1/4) |
| 1910 | tournament not created | (France) Jeanne Matthey * | (United Kingdom) Dorothea Douglass Lambert Chambers (4/7) | (United States) Hazel Hotchkiss Wightman (2/4) |
| 1911 | tournament not created | (France) Jeanne Matthey * | (United Kingdom) Dorothea Douglass Lambert Chambers (5/7) | (United States) Hazel Hotchkiss Wightman (3/4) |
| 1912 | tournament not created | (France) Jeanne Matthey * | (United Kingdom) Ethel Thomson Larcombe (1/1) | (United States) Mary Browne (1/3) |
| 1913 | tournament not created | (France) Marguerite Broquedis * | (United Kingdom) Dorothea Douglass Lambert Chambers (6/7) | (United States) Mary Browne (2/3) |
| 1914 | tournament not created | (France) Marguerite Broquedis * | (United Kingdom) Dorothea Douglass Lambert Chambers (7/7) | (United States) Mary Browne (3/3) |
| 1915 | tournament not created | World War I | World War I | (Norway) Molla Bjurstedt Mallory (1/8) |
| 1916 | tournament not created | World War I | World War I | (Norway) Molla Bjurstedt Mallory (2/8) |
| 1917 | tournament not created | World War I | World War I | (Norway) Molla Bjurstedt Mallory (3/8) |
| 1918 | tournament not created | World War I | World War I | (Norway) Molla Bjurstedt Mallory (4/8) |
| 1919 | tournament not created | World War I | (France) Suzanne Lenglen (1/8) | (United States) Hazel Hotchkiss Wightman (4/4) |
| 1920 | tournament not created | (France) Suzanne Lenglen * | (France) Suzanne Lenglen (2/8) | (United States) Molla Bjurstedt Mallory (5/8) |
| 1921 | tournament not created | (France) Suzanne Lenglen * | (France) Suzanne Lenglen (3/8) | (United States) Molla Bjurstedt Mallory (6/8) |
| 1922 | (Australia) Margaret Molesworth (1/2) | (France) Suzanne Lenglen * | (France) Suzanne Lenglen (4/8) | (United States) Molla Bjurstedt Mallory (7/8) |
| 1923 | (Australia) Margaret Molesworth (2/2) | (France) Suzanne Lenglen * | (France) Suzanne Lenglen (5/8) | (United States) Helen Wills Moody (1/19) |
| 1924 | (Australia) Sylvia Lance Harper (1/1) | (France) Julie Vlasto * | (United Kingdom) Kathleen McKane Godfree (1/2) | (United States) Helen Wills Moody (2/19) |
| 1925 | (Australia) Daphne Akhurst (1/5) | (France) Suzanne Lenglen (6/8) | (France) Suzanne Lenglen (7/8) | (United States) Helen Wills Moody (3/19) |
| 1926 | (Australia) Daphne Akhurst (2/5) | (France) Suzanne Lenglen (8/8) | (United Kingdom) Kathleen McKane Godfree (2/2) | (United States) Molla Bjurstedt Mallory (8/8) |
| 1927 | (Australia) Esna Boyd Robertson (1/1) | (Netherlands) Kornelia Bouman (1/1) | (United States) Helen Wills Moody (4/19) | (United States) Helen Wills Moody (5/19) |
| 1928 | (Australia) Daphne Akhurst (3/5) | (United States) Helen Wills Moody (6/19) | (United States) Helen Wills Moody (7/19) | (United States) Helen Wills Moody (8/19) |
| 1929 | (Australia) Daphne Akhurst (4/5) | (United States) Helen Wills Moody (9/19) | (United States) Helen Wills Moody (10/19) | (United States) Helen Wills Moody (11/19) |
| 1930 | (Australia) Daphne Akhurst (5/5) | (United States) Helen Wills Moody (12/19) | (United States) Helen Wills Moody (13/19) | (United Kingdom) Betty Nuthall (1/1) |
| 1931 | (Australia) Coral McInnes Buttsworth (1/2) | (Weimar Republic) Cilly Aussem (1/2) | (Weimar Republic) Cilly Aussem (2/2) | (United States) Helen Wills Moody (14/19) |
| 1932 | (Australia) Coral McInnes Buttsworth (2/2) | (United States) Helen Wills Moody (15/19) | (United States) Helen Wills Moody (16/19) | (United States) Helen Jacobs (1/5) |
| 1933 | (Australia) Joan Hartigan (1/3) | (United Kingdom) Peggy Scriven Vivian (1/2) | (United States) Helen Wills Moody (17/19) | (United States) Helen Jacobs (2/5) |
| 1934 | (Australia) Joan Hartigan (2/3) | (United Kingdom) Peggy Scriven Vivian (2/2) | (United Kingdom) Dorothy Round (1/3) | (United States) Helen Jacobs (3/5) |
| 1935 | (United Kingdom) Dorothy Round (2/3) | (Denmark) Hilde Krahwinkel Sperling (Note: Krahwinkel Sperling became a dual-citizen of Denmark after marrying in 1933. In January 1934, she declared she would be representing Denmark and had become a member of the Hellerup Idrætsklub.) (1/3) | (United States) Helen Wills Moody (18/19) | (United States) Helen Jacobs (4/5) |
| 1936 | (Australia) Joan Hartigan (3/3) | (Denmark) Hilde Krahwinkel Sperling (2/3) | (United States) Helen Jacobs (5/5) | (United States) Alice Marble (1/5) |
| 1937 | (Australia) Nancye Wynne Bolton (1/6) | (Denmark) Hilde Krahwinkel Sperling (3/3) | (United Kingdom) Dorothy Round (3/3) | (Chile) Anita Lizana (1/1) |
| 1938 | (United States) Dorothy Bundy Cheney (1/1) | (France) Simonne Passemard Mathieu (1/2) | (United States) Helen Wills Moody (19/19) | (United States) Alice Marble (2/5) |
| 1939 | (Australia) Emily Hood Westacott (1/1) | (France) Simonne Passemard Mathieu (2/2) | (United States) Alice Marble (3/5) | (United States) Alice Marble (4/5) |
| 1940 | (Australia) Nancye Wynne Bolton (2/6) | cancelled (World War II) | World War II | (United States) Alice Marble (5/5) |
| 1941 | World War II | (Luxembourg) Alice Weiwers^{†} | World War II | (United States) Sarah Palfrey Cooke (1/2) |
| 1942 | World War II | (Luxembourg) Alice Weiwers^{†} | World War II | (United States) Pauline Betz (1/5) |
| 1943 | World War II | (France) Simone Iribarne Lafargue^{†} | World War II | (United States) Pauline Betz (2/5) |
| 1944 | World War II | (France) Raymonde Veber Jones^{†} | World War II | (United States) Pauline Betz (3/5) |
| 1945 | World War II | (Switzerland) Lolette Payot^{†} | World War II | (United States) Sarah Palfrey Cooke (2/2) |
| 1946 | (Australia) Nancye Wynne Bolton (3/6) | (United States) Margaret Osborne duPont ^{$} (1/6) | (United States) Pauline Betz (4/5) | (United States) Pauline Betz (5/5) |
| 1947 | (Australia) Nancye Wynne Bolton (4/6) | (United States) Patricia Canning Todd ^{$} (1/1) | (United States) Margaret Osborne duPont (2/6) | (United States) Louise Brough (1/6) |
| 1948 | (Australia) Nancye Wynne Bolton (5/6) | (France) Nelly Landry (1/1) | (United States) Louise Brough (2/6) | (United States) Margaret Osborne duPont (3/6) |
| 1949 | (United States) Doris Hart (1/6) | (United States) Margaret Osborne duPont (4/6) | (United States) Louise Brough (3/6) | (United States) Margaret Osborne duPont (5/6) |
| 1950 | (United States) Louise Brough (4/6) | (United States) Doris Hart (2/6) | (United States) Louise Brough (5/6) | (United States) Margaret Osborne duPont (6/6) |
| 1951 | (Australia) Nancye Wynne Bolton (6/6) | (United States) Shirley Fry (1/4) | (United States) Doris Hart (3/6) | (United States) Maureen Connolly (1/9) |
| 1952 | (Australia) Thelma Coyne Long (1/2) | (United States) Doris Hart (4/6) | (United States) Maureen Connolly (2/9) | (United States) Maureen Connolly (3/9) |
| 1953 | (United States) Maureen Connolly (4/9) | (United States) Maureen Connolly (5/9) | (United States) Maureen Connolly (6/9) | (United States) Maureen Connolly (7/9) |
| 1954 | (Australia) Thelma Coyne Long (2/2) | (United States) Maureen Connolly (8/9) | (United States) Maureen Connolly (9/9) | (United States) Doris Hart (5/6) |
| 1955 | (Australia) Beryl Penrose (1/1) | (United Kingdom) Angela Mortimer (1/3) | (United States) Louise Brough (6/6) | (United States) Doris Hart (6/6) |
| 1956 | (Australia) Mary Carter Reitano (1/2) | (United States) Althea Gibson (1/5) | (United States) Shirley Fry (2/4) | (United States) Shirley Fry (3/4) |
| 1957 | (United States) Shirley Fry (4/4) | (United Kingdom) Shirley Bloomer Brasher (1/1) | (United States) Althea Gibson (2/5) | (United States) Althea Gibson (3/5) |
| 1958 | (United Kingdom) Angela Mortimer (2/3) | (Hungary) Zsuzsa Körmöczy (1/1) | (United States) Althea Gibson (4/5) | (United States) Althea Gibson (5/5) |
| 1959 | (Australia) Mary Carter Reitano (2/2) | (United Kingdom) Christine Truman (1/1) | (Brazil) Maria Bueno (1/7) | (Brazil) Maria Bueno (2/7) |
| 1960 | (Australia) Margaret Smith Court (1/24) | (United States) Darlene Hard (1/3) | (Brazil) Maria Bueno (3/7) | (United States) Darlene Hard (2/3) |
| 1961 | (Australia) Margaret Smith Court (2/24) | (United Kingdom) Ann Haydon Jones (1/3) | (United Kingdom) Angela Mortimer (3/3) | (United States) Darlene Hard (3/3) |
| 1962 | (Australia) Margaret Smith Court (3/24) | (Australia) Margaret Smith Court (4/24) | (United States) Karen Hantze Susman (1/1) | (Australia) Margaret Smith Court (5/24) |
| 1963 | (Australia) Margaret Smith Court (6/24) | (Australia) Lesley Turner Bowrey (1/2) | (Australia) Margaret Smith Court (7/24) | (Brazil) Maria Bueno (4/7) |
| 1964 | (Australia) Margaret Smith Court (8/24) | (Australia) Margaret Smith Court (9/24) | (Brazil) Maria Bueno (5/7) | (Brazil) Maria Bueno (6/7) |
| 1965 | (Australia) Margaret Smith Court (10/24) | (Australia) Lesley Turner Bowrey (2/2) | (Australia) Margaret Smith Court (11/24) | (Australia) Margaret Smith Court (12/24) |
| 1966 | (Australia) Margaret Smith Court (13/24) | (United Kingdom) Ann Haydon Jones (2/3) | (United States) Billie Jean Moffitt King (1/12) | (Brazil) Maria Bueno (7/7) |
| 1967 | (United States) Nancy Richey (1/2) | (France) Françoise Dürr (1/1) | (United States) Billie Jean Moffitt King (2/12) | (United States) Billie Jean Moffitt King (3/12) |
| 1968 | (United States) Billie Jean Moffitt King (4/12) | ↓ Open Era ↓ | | |
| 1968 | ↓ Open Era ↓ | (United States) Nancy Richey (2/2) | (United States) Billie Jean Moffitt King (5/12) | (United Kingdom) Virginia Wade (1/3) |
| 1969 | (Australia) Margaret Smith Court (14/24) | (Australia) Margaret Smith Court (15/24) | (United Kingdom) Ann Haydon Jones (3/3) | (Australia) Margaret Smith Court (16/24) |
| 1970 | (Australia) Margaret Smith Court (17/24) | (Australia) Margaret Smith Court (18/24) | (Australia) Margaret Smith Court (19/24) | (Australia) Margaret Smith Court (20/24) |
| 1971 | (Australia) Margaret Smith Court (21/24) | (Australia) Evonne Goolagong Cawley (1/7) | (Australia) Evonne Goolagong Cawley (2/7) | (United States) Billie Jean Moffitt King (6/12) |
| 1972 | (United Kingdom) Virginia Wade (2/3) | (United States) Billie Jean Moffitt King (7/12) | (United States) Billie Jean Moffitt King (8/12) | (United States) Billie Jean Moffitt King (9/12) |
| 1973 | (Australia) Margaret Smith Court (22/24) | (Australia) Margaret Smith Court (23/24) | (United States) Billie Jean Moffitt King (10/12) | (Australia) Margaret Smith Court (24/24) |
| 1974 | (Australia) Evonne Goolagong Cawley (3/7) | (United States) Chris Evert (1/18) | (United States) Chris Evert (2/18) | (United States) Billie Jean Moffitt King (11/12) |
| 1975 | (Australia) Evonne Goolagong Cawley (4/7) | (United States) Chris Evert (3/18) | (United States) Billie Jean Moffitt King (12/12) | (United States) Chris Evert (4/18) |
| 1976 | (Australia) Evonne Goolagong Cawley (5/7) | (United Kingdom) Sue Barker (1/1) | (United States) Chris Evert (5/18) | (United States) Chris Evert (6/18) |
| 1977 | (Australia) Kerry Melville Reid (1/1) ^{(Jan)} | (Socialist Federal Republic of Yugoslavia) Mima Jaušovec (1/1) | (United Kingdom) Virginia Wade (3/3) | (United States) Chris Evert (7/18) |
| 1977 | (Australia) Evonne Goolagong Cawley (6/7) ^{(Dec)} | (Socialist Federal Republic of Yugoslavia) Mima Jaušovec (1/1) | (United Kingdom) Virginia Wade (3/3) | (United States) Chris Evert (7/18) |
| 1978 | (Australia) Chris O'Neil (1/1) ^{‡} | (Romania) Virginia Ruzici (1/1) | (United States) Martina Navratilova (1/18) | (United States) Chris Evert (8/18) |
| 1979 | (United States) Barbara Jordan (1/1) ^{‡} | (United States) Chris Evert (9/18) | (United States) Martina Navratilova (2/18) | (United States) Tracy Austin (1/2) |
| 1980 | (Czechoslovakia) Hana Mandlíková (1/4) ^{‡} | (United States) Chris Evert (10/18) | (Australia) Evonne Goolagong Cawley (7/7) | (United States) Chris Evert (11/18) |
| 1981 | (United States) Martina Navratilova (3/18) ^{‡} | (Czechoslovakia) Hana Mandlíková (2/4) | (United States) Chris Evert (12/18) | (United States) Tracy Austin (2/2) |
| 1982 | (United States) Chris Evert (14/18) ^{‡} | (United States) Martina Navratilova (4/18) | (United States) Martina Navratilova (5/18) | (United States) Chris Evert (13/18) |
| 1983 | (United States) Martina Navratilova (8/18) ^{‡} | (United States) Chris Evert (15/18) | (United States) Martina Navratilova (6/18) | (United States) Martina Navratilova (7/18) |
| 1984 | (United States) Chris Evert (16/18) ^{‡} | (United States) Martina Navratilova (9/18) | (United States) Martina Navratilova (10/18) | (United States) Martina Navratilova (11/18) |
| 1985 | (United States) Martina Navratilova (13/18) ^{‡} | (United States) Chris Evert (17/18) | (United States) Martina Navratilova (12/18) | (Czechoslovakia) Hana Mandlíková (3/4) |
| 1986 | Tournament date changed ^{‡} | (United States) Chris Evert (18/18) | (United States) Martina Navratilova (14/18) | (United States) Martina Navratilova (15/18) |
| 1987 | (Czechoslovakia) Hana Mandlíková (4/4) | (West Germany) Steffi Graf (1/22) | (United States) Martina Navratilova (16/18) | (United States) Martina Navratilova (17/18) |
| 1988 | (West Germany) Steffi Graf (2/22) | (West Germany) Steffi Graf (3/22) | (West Germany) Steffi Graf (4/22) | (West Germany) Steffi Graf (5/22) |
| 1989 | (West Germany) Steffi Graf (6/22) | (Spain) Arantxa Sánchez Vicario (1/4) | (West Germany) Steffi Graf (7/22) | (West Germany) Steffi Graf (8/22) |
| 1990 | (West Germany) Steffi Graf (9/22) | (Socialist Federal Republic of Yugoslavia) Monica Seles (1/9) | (United States) Martina Navratilova (18/18) | (Argentina) Gabriela Sabatini (1/1) |
| 1991 | (Socialist Federal Republic of Yugoslavia) Monica Seles (2/9) | (Socialist Federal Republic of Yugoslavia) Monica Seles (3/9) | (Germany) Steffi Graf (10/22) | (Socialist Federal Republic of Yugoslavia) Monica Seles (4/9) |
| 1992 | (Socialist Federal Republic of Yugoslavia) Monica Seles (5/9) | (Federal Republic of Yugoslavia) Monica Seles (6/9) | (Germany) Steffi Graf (11/22) | (Federal Republic of Yugoslavia) Monica Seles (7/9) |
| 1993 | (Federal Republic of Yugoslavia) Monica Seles (8/9) | (Germany) Steffi Graf (12/22) | (Germany) Steffi Graf (13/22) | (Germany) Steffi Graf (14/22) |
| 1994 | (Germany) Steffi Graf (15/22) | (Spain) Arantxa Sánchez Vicario (2/4) | (Spain) Conchita Martínez (1/1) | (Spain) Arantxa Sánchez Vicario (3/4) |
| 1995 | (France) Mary Pierce (1/2) | (Germany) Steffi Graf (16/22) | (Germany) Steffi Graf (17/22) | (Germany) Steffi Graf (18/22) |
| 1996 | (United States) Monica Seles (9/9) | (Germany) Steffi Graf (19/22) | (Germany) Steffi Graf (20/22) | (Germany) Steffi Graf (21/22) |
| 1997 | (Switzerland) Martina Hingis (1/5) | (Croatia) Iva Majoli (1/1) | (Switzerland) Martina Hingis (2/5) | (Switzerland) Martina Hingis (3/5) |
| 1998 | (Switzerland) Martina Hingis (4/5) | (Spain) Arantxa Sánchez Vicario (4/4) | (Czech Republic) Jana Novotná (1/1) | (United States) Lindsay Davenport (1/3) |
| 1999 | (Switzerland) Martina Hingis (5/5) | (Germany) Steffi Graf (22/22) | (United States) Lindsay Davenport (2/3) | (United States) Serena Williams (1/23) |
| 2000 | (United States) Lindsay Davenport (3/3) | (France) Mary Pierce (2/2) | (United States) Venus Williams (1/7) | (United States) Venus Williams (2/7) |
| 2001 | (United States) Jennifer Capriati (1/3) | (United States) Jennifer Capriati (2/3) | (United States) Venus Williams (3/7) | (United States) Venus Williams (4/7) |
| 2002 | (United States) Jennifer Capriati (3/3) | (United States) Serena Williams (2/23) | (United States) Serena Williams (3/23) | (United States) Serena Williams (4/23) |
| 2003 | (United States) Serena Williams (5/23) | (Belgium) Justine Henin (1/7) | (United States) Serena Williams (6/23) | (Belgium) Justine Henin (2/7) |
| 2004 | (Belgium) Justine Henin (3/7) | (Russia) Anastasia Myskina (1/1) | (Russia) Maria Sharapova (1/5) | (Russia) Svetlana Kuznetsova (1/2) |
| 2005 | (United States) Serena Williams (7/23) | (Belgium) Justine Henin (4/7) | (United States) Venus Williams (5/7) | (Belgium) Kim Clijsters (1/4) |
| 2006 | (France) Amélie Mauresmo (1/2) | (Belgium) Justine Henin (5/7) | (France) Amélie Mauresmo (2/2) | (Russia) Maria Sharapova (2/5) |
| 2007 | (United States) Serena Williams (8/23) | (Belgium) Justine Henin (6/7) | (United States) Venus Williams (6/7) | (Belgium) Justine Henin (7/7) |
| 2008 | (Russia) Maria Sharapova (3/5) | (Serbia) Ana Ivanovic (1/1) | (United States) Venus Williams (7/7) | (United States) Serena Williams (9/23) |
| 2009 | (United States) Serena Williams (10/23) | (Russia) Svetlana Kuznetsova (2/2) | (United States) Serena Williams (11/23) | (Belgium) Kim Clijsters (2/4) |
| 2010 | (United States) Serena Williams (12/23) | (Italy) Francesca Schiavone (1/1) | (United States) Serena Williams (13/23) | (Belgium) Kim Clijsters (3/4) |
| 2011 | (Belgium) Kim Clijsters (4/4) | (China) Li Na (1/2) | (Czech Republic) Petra Kvitová (1/2) | (Australia) Samantha Stosur (1/1) |
| 2012 | (Belarus) Victoria Azarenka (1/2) | (Russia) Maria Sharapova (4/5) | (United States) Serena Williams (14/23) | (United States) Serena Williams (15/23) |
| 2013 | (Belarus) Victoria Azarenka (2/2) | (United States) Serena Williams (16/23) | (France) Marion Bartoli (1/1) | (United States) Serena Williams (17/23) |
| 2014 | (China) Li Na (2/2) | (Russia) Maria Sharapova (5/5) | (Czech Republic) Petra Kvitová (2/2) | (United States) Serena Williams (18/23) |
| 2015 | (United States) Serena Williams (19/23) | (United States) Serena Williams (20/23) | (United States) Serena Williams (21/23) | (Italy) Flavia Pennetta (1/1) |
| 2016 | (Germany) Angelique Kerber (1/3) | (Spain) Garbiñe Muguruza (1/2) | (United States) Serena Williams (22/23) | (Germany) Angelique Kerber (2/3) |
| 2017 | (United States) Serena Williams (23/23) | (Latvia) Jeļena Ostapenko (1/1) | (Spain) Garbiñe Muguruza (2/2) | (United States) Sloane Stephens (1/1) |
| 2018 | (Denmark) Caroline Wozniacki (1/1) | (Romania) Simona Halep (1/2) | (Germany) Angelique Kerber (3/3) | (Japan) Naomi Osaka (1/4) |
| 2019 | (Japan) Naomi Osaka (2/4) | (Australia) Ashleigh Barty (1/3) | (Romania) Simona Halep (2/2) | (Canada) Bianca Andreescu (1/1) |
| 2020 | (United States) Sofia Kenin (1/1) | (Poland) Iga Świątek ^{◊} (1/6) | cancelled (COVID-19 pandemic) | (Japan) Naomi Osaka (3/4) |
| 2021 | (Japan) Naomi Osaka (4/4) | (Czech Republic) Barbora Krejčíková (1/2) | (Australia) Ashleigh Barty (2/3) | (United Kingdom) Emma Raducanu (1/1) |
| 2022 | (Australia) Ashleigh Barty (3/3) | (Poland) Iga Świątek (2/6) | (Kazakhstan) Elena Rybakina (1/3) | (Poland) Iga Świątek (3/6) |
| 2023 | Aryna Sabalenka (Note: On 1 March 2022, the WTA announced that players from Belarus will not be allowed to compete under the name or flag of Belarus following the 2022 Russian invasion of Ukraine. Aryna Sabalenka thus competed as neutral player since then and her four titles are not attributed to Belarus in the "Grand Slam titles by country" list.) (1/4) | (Poland) Iga Świątek (4/6) | (Czech Republic) Markéta Vondroušová (1/1) | (United States) Coco Gauff (1/2) |
| 2024 | Aryna Sabalenka (2/4) | (Poland) Iga Świątek (5/6) | (Czech Republic) Barbora Krejčíková (2/2) | Aryna Sabalenka (3/4) |
| 2025 | (United States) Madison Keys (1/1) | (United States) Coco Gauff (2/2) | (Poland) Iga Świątek (6/6) | Aryna Sabalenka (4/4) |
| 2026 | (Kazakhstan) Elena Rybakina (2/3) | Mirra Andreeva (Note: On 1 March 2022, the WTA announced that players from Russia will not be allowed to compete under the name or flag of Russia following the 2022 Russian invasion of Ukraine. Mirra Andreeva thus competed as neutral player since then and her first and only title is not attributed to Russia in the "Grand Slam titles by country" list.) (1/1) | (Czech Republic) Linda Nosková (1/1) | (Kazakhstan) Elena Rybakina (3/3) |
| Year | Australian Open | French Open | Wimbledon | US Open |

== Champions list ==
| AO Australian Open | WIM Wimbledon |
| FO French Open | USO US Open |

Tournament record and active players indicated in bold.

| Titles | Player | AO | FO | WIM | USO | Years |
|---|---|---|---|---|---|---|
| 24 | (Australia) Margaret Court | **11** | 5 | 3 | 5 | 1960–1973 |
| 23 | (United States) **Serena Williams** | 7 | 3 | 7 | 6 | 1999–2017 |
| 22 | (Germany) Steffi Graf | 4 | 6 | 7 | 5 | 1987–1999 |
| 19 | (United States) Helen Wills Moody | 0 | 4 | 8 | 7 | 1923–1938 |
| 18 | (United States) Chris Evert | 2 | **7** | 3 | 6 | 1974–1986 |
| 18 | (United States) Martina Navratilova | 3 | 2 | **9** | 4 | 1978–1990 |
| 12 | (United States) Billie Jean King | 1 | 1 | 6 | 4 | 1966–1975 |
| 9 | (United States) Maureen Connolly | 1 | 2 | 3 | 3 | 1951–1954 |
| 9 | (Socialist Federal Republic of Yugoslavia) / (Serbia and Montenegro) / (United States) Monica Seles | 4 | 3 | 0 | 2 | 1990–1996 |
| 8 | (Norway) / (United States) Molla Bjurstedt Mallory | 0 | 0 | 0 | **8** | 1915–1922 |
| 8 | (France) Suzanne Lenglen | 0 | 2 | 6 | 0 | 1919–1926 |
Top 10

- 133 players have won at least one of the 468 majors that have been played (as of the 2026 US Open).

== Grand Slam tournament titles by decade ==
as of 2026 Wimbledon.

**1880s**

| 2 | **Bingley Hillyard, Dod, Townsend, Watson** |

| 1 | Hansell |

**1890s**

| 3 | **Atkinson, Bingley Hillyard, Cooper Sterry, Dod** |

| 2 | Cahill |

| 1 | Hellwig, Jones, Moore, Rice, Roosevelt, Terry |

**1900s**

| 3 | **Lambert Chambers, Moore, Sutton** |

| 2 | Cooper Sterry |

| 1 | Barger-Wallach, Bingley Hillyard, Boothby, Homans, Hotchkiss Wightman, Jones, McAteer, Robb, E. Sears |

**1910s**

| 4 | **Bjurstedt Mallory, Lambert Chambers** |

| 3 | Browne, Hotchkiss Wightman |

| 1 | Lenglen, Thomson Larcombe |

**1920s**

| 11 | **Wills Moody** |

| 7 | Lenglen |

| 4 | Akhurst, Bjurstedt Mallory |

| 2 | McKane Godfree, Molesworth |

| 1 | Bouman, Boyd Robertson, Lance Harper |

**1930s**

| 8 | **Wills Moody** |

| 5 | Jacobs |

| 4 | Marble |

| 3 | Hartigan, Krahwinkel Sperling, Round |

| 2 | Aussem, Mathieu, McInnes Buttsworth, Scriven |

| 1 | Akhurst, Bundy, Hood Westacott, Lizana, Nuthall, Wynne Bolton |

**1940s**

| 5 | **Betz, Osborne duPont** |

| 4 | Wynne Bolton |

| 3 | Brough |

| 2 | Palfrey Cooke |

| 1 | Canning Todd, Hart, Landry, Marble |

**1950s**

| 9 | **Connolly** |

| 5 | Gibson, Hart |

| 4 | Fry |

| 3 | Brough |

| 2 | Bueno, Carter Reitano, Coyne Long, Mortimer |

| 1 | Bloomer, Körmöczy, Osborne duPont, Penrose Collier, Truman, Wynne Bolton |

**1960s**

| 16 | **Court** |

| 5 | Bueno, B. J. King |

| 3 | Hard, Haydon-Jones |

| 2 | Richey, Turner Bowrey |

| 1 | Dürr, Hantze Susman, Mortimer, Wade |

**1970s**

| 9 | **Evert** |

| 8 | Court |

| 7 | B. J. King |

| 6 | Goolagong Cawley |

| 2 | Navratilova, Wade |

| 1 | Austin, Barker, Jaušovec, Jordan, Melville Reid, O'Neil, Ruzici |

**1980s**

| 15 | **Navratilova** |

| 9 | Evert |

| 8 | Graf |

| 4 | Mandlíková |

| 1 | Austin, Goolagong Cawley, Sánchez Vicario |

**1990s**

| 14 | **Graf** |

| 9 | Seles |

| 5 | Hingis |

| 3 | Sánchez Vicario |

| 2 | Davenport |

| 1 | Majoli, Martínez, Navratilova, Novotná, Pierce, Sabatini, S. Williams |

**2000s**

| 10 | **S. Williams** |

| 7 | Henin, V. Williams |

| 3 | Capriati, Sharapova |

| 2 | Clijsters, Kuznetsova, Mauresmo |

| 1 | Davenport, Ivanovic, Myskina, Pierce |

**2010s**

| 12 | **S. Williams** |

| 3 | Kerber |

| 2 | Azarenka, Clijsters, Halep, Kvitová, Li, Muguruza, Osaka, Sharapova |

| 1 | Andreescu, Bartoli, Barty, Ostapenko, Pennetta, Schiavone, Stephens, Stosur, Wozniacki |

**2020s**

| 6 | **Świątek** |

| 4 | Sabalenka |

| 3 | Rybakina |

| 2 | Barty, Gauff, Krejčíková, Osaka |

| 1 | Andreeva, Kenin, Keys, Nosková, Raducanu, Vondroušová |

== Grand Slam achievements ==
These are players who achieved some form of a tennis Grand Slam. They include a Grand Slam, non-calendar year Grand Slam, Career Grand Slam, Career Golden Slam, and Career Super Slam. No player has won a single season Super Slam. The tennis Open Era began in 1968, after the Australian Open and before the French Open.

| H Hard court | C Clay court | G Grass court | Cp Carpet court |

=== Grand Slam ===
Players who held all four major titles simultaneously (in a calendar year).

| Player | Australian Open | French Open | Wimbledon | US Open |
|---|---|---|---|---|
| (United States) Maureen Connolly | 1953_{G} | 1953_{C} | 1953_{G} | 1953_{G} |
| (Australia) Margaret Court | 1970_{G} | 1970_{C} | 1970_{G} | 1970_{G} |
| (West Germany) Steffi Graf | 1988_{H} | 1988_{C} | 1988_{G} | 1988_{H} |

=== Non-calendar year Grand Slam ===
Players who held all four major titles simultaneously (not in a calendar year).
From 1977 to 1985, the Australian Open was the last major tournament held in a season.

| Player | From | To | Streak |
|---|---|---|---|
| (United States) Martina Navratilova | 1983 Wimbledon | 1984 US Open | 6 |
| (Germany) Steffi Graf | 1993 French Open | 1994 Australian Open | 4 |
| (United States) Serena Williams | 2002 French Open | 2003 Australian Open | 4 |
| (United States) Serena Williams (2) | 2014 US Open | 2015 Wimbledon | 4 |

=== Career Grand Slam ===
Players who won all four Grand Slam titles over the course of their careers.
Until 1977 the 4 Slams were played on 2 different surfaces (grass, clay). After 1978 they were contested on 3.

- The event at which the Career Grand Slam was completed indicated in **bold**.

| Player | Australian Open | French Open | Wimbledon | US Open |
|---|---|---|---|---|
| (United States) Maureen Connolly | 1953_{G} | **1953**_{C} | 1952_{G} | 1951_{G} |
| (United States) Doris Hart | 1949_{G} | 1950_{C} | 1951_{G} | **1954**_{G} |
| (United States) Shirley Fry Irvin | **1957**_{G} | 1951_{C} | 1956_{G} | 1956_{G} |
| (Australia) Margaret Court | 1960_{G} | 1962_{C} | **1963**_{G} | 1962_{G} |
| (Australia) Margaret Court (2) | 1961_{G} | 1964_{C} | 1965_{G} | **1965**_{G} |
| (Australia) Margaret Court (3) | 1962_{G} | 1969_{C} | **1970**_{G} | 1969_{G} |
| (United States) Billie Jean King | 1968_{G} | **1972**_{C} | 1966_{G} | 1967_{G} |
| (United States) Chris Evert | **1982**_{G} | 1974_{C} | 1974_{G} | 1975_{C} |
| (United States) Martina Navratilova | 1981_{G} | 1982_{C} | 1978_{G} | **1983**_{H} |
| (United States) Martina Navratilova (2) | 1983_{G} | 1984_{C} | 1979_{G} | **1984**_{H} |
| (United States) Chris Evert (2) | **1984**_{G} | 1975_{C} | 1976_{G} | 1976_{C} |
| (Germany) Steffi Graf | 1988_{H} | 1987_{C} | 1988_{G} | **1988**_{H} |
| (Germany) Steffi Graf (2) | 1989_{H} | 1988_{C} | 1989_{G} | **1989**_{H} |
| (Germany) Steffi Graf (3) | 1990_{H} | 1993_{C} | 1991_{G} | **1993**_{H} |
| (Germany) Steffi Graf (4) | 1994_{H} | 1995_{C} | 1992_{G} | **1995**_{H} |
| (United States) Serena Williams | **2003**_{H} | 2002_{C} | 2002_{G} | 1999_{H} |
| (Russia) Maria Sharapova | 2008_{H} | **2012**_{C} | 2004_{G} | 2006_{H} |
| (United States) Serena Williams (2) | 2005_{H} | **2013**_{C} | 2003_{G} | 2002_{H} |
| (United States) Serena Williams (3) | 2007_{H} | **2015**_{C} | 2009_{G} | 2008_{H} |

=== Golden Slam ===
Players who held all four Grand Slam titles and the Olympic gold medal simultaneously.

| Player | Australian Open | French Open | Wimbledon | US Open | Olympics |
|---|---|---|---|---|---|
| (Germany) Steffi Graf | 1988_{H} | 1988_{C} | 1988_{G} | 1988_{H} | 1988_{H} |

=== Career Golden Slam ===
Players who won all four Grand Slam titles and the Olympic gold medal over the course of their careers.

- The event at which the Career Golden Slam was completed indicated in **bold**.

| Player | Australian Open | French Open | Wimbledon | US Open | Olympics |
|---|---|---|---|---|---|
| (Germany) Steffi Graf | 1988_{H} | 1987_{C} | 1988_{G} | 1988_{H} | **1988**_{H} |
| (United States) Serena Williams | 2003_{H} | 2002_{C} | 2002_{G} | 1999_{H} | **2012**_{G} |

=== Career Super Slam ===
Players who won all four Grand Slam titles, the Olympic gold medal and the year-end championship over the course of their careers.

- The event at which the Career Super Slam was completed indicated in **bold**.

| Player | Australian Open | French Open | Wimbledon | US Open | Olympics | Year-end |
|---|---|---|---|---|---|---|
| (Germany) Steffi Graf | 1988_{H} | 1987_{C} | 1988_{G} | 1988_{H} | **1988**_{H} | 1987_{Cp} |
| (United States) Serena Williams | 2003_{H} | 2002_{C} | 2002_{G} | 1999_{H} | **2012**_{G} | 2001_{Cp} |

=== Career Surface Slam ===
Players who won major titles on clay, grass and hard courts over the course of their careers.

- The event at which the Career Surface Slam was completed indicated in **bold**

| Player | Clay court | Hard court | Grass court |
|---|---|---|---|
| (United States) Chris Evert | 1974 French Open | **1978 US Open** | 1974 Wimbledon |
| (United States) Chris Evert (2) | 1975 French Open | **1980 US Open** | 1976 Wimbledon |
| (United States) Chris Evert (3) | 1975 US Open | **1982 US Open** | 1981 Wimbledon |
| (United States) Martina Navratilova | 1982 French Open | **1983 US Open** | 1978 Wimbledon |
| (United States) Martina Navratilova (2) | 1984 French Open | **1984 US Open** | 1979 Wimbledon |
| (Czech Republic) Hana Mandlíková | 1981 French Open | **1985 US Open** | 1983 Australian Open |
| (West Germany) Steffi Graf | 1987 French Open | 1988 Australian Open | **1988 Wimbledon** |
| (West Germany) Steffi Graf (2) | 1988 French Open | 1988 US Open | **1989 Wimbledon** |
| (West Germany) / (Germany) Steffi Graf (3) | **1993 French Open** | 1989 Australian Open | 1991 Wimbledon |
| (West Germany) / (Germany) Steffi Graf (4) | **1995 French Open** | 1989 US Open | 1992 Wimbledon |
| (West Germany) / (Germany) Steffi Graf (5) | **1996 French Open** | 1990 Australian Open | 1993 Wimbledon |
| (Germany) Steffi Graf (6) | **1999 French Open** | 1993 US Open | 1995 Wimbledon |
| (United States) Serena Williams | 2002 French Open | 1999 US Open | **2002 Wimbledon** |
| (Russia) Maria Sharapova | **2012 French Open** | 2006 US Open | 2004 Wimbledon |
| (United States) Serena Williams (2) | **2013 French Open** | 2002 US Open | 2003 Wimbledon |
| (United States) Serena Williams (3) | **2015 French Open** | 2003 Australian Open | 2009 Wimbledon |
| (Australia) Ashleigh Barty | 2019 French Open | **2022 Australian Open** | 2021 Wimbledon |
| (Poland) Iga Świątek | 2020 French Open | 2022 US Open | **2025 Wimbledon** |

== Multiple titles in a season ==
♠ Player won all four major tournaments in the same year.

=== Three titles ===
★ Surface Slam (major titles on 3 different surfaces in the same season). (Note: The Australian Open was played on grass until 1987, and the US Open was played on grass until 1977.)

Australian—French—Wimbledon
| 1953^{♠} | (United States) Maureen Connolly |
**Open Era**
| 1970^{♠} | (Australia) Margaret Court |
| 1988^{♠★} | (West Germany) Steffi Graf |
| 2015^{★} | (United States) Serena Williams |

| class="col-break " style=" padding-left: 1em;" |

Australian—French—U.S.
| 1953^{♠} | (United States) Maureen Connolly |
| 1962 | (Australia) Margaret Court |
**Open Era**
| 1969 | (Australia) Margaret Court |
| 1970^{♠} | (Australia) Margaret Court |
| 1973 | (Australia) Margaret Court |
| 1988^{♠★} | (West Germany) Steffi Graf |
| 1991 | (Socialist Federal Republic of Yugoslavia) / (Serbia and Montenegro) Monica Seles |
| 1992 | (Socialist Federal Republic of Yugoslavia) / (Serbia and Montenegro) Monica Seles |

Australian—Wimbledon—U.S.
| 1953^{♠} | (United States) Maureen Connolly |
| 1965 | (Australia) Margaret Court |
**Open Era**
| 1970^{♠} | (Australia) Margaret Court |
| 1983 | (United States) Martina Navratilova |
| 1988^{♠★} | (West Germany) Steffi Graf |
| 1989 | (West Germany) Steffi Graf |
| 1997 | (Switzerland) Martina Hingis |

French—Wimbledon—U.S.
| 1928 | (United States) Helen Wills |
| 1929 | (United States) Helen Wills |
| 1953^{♠} | (United States) Maureen Connolly |
**Open Era**
| 1970^{♠} | (Australia) Margaret Court |
| 1972 | (United States) Billie Jean King |
| 1984^{★} | (United States) Martina Navratilova |
| 1988^{♠★} | (West Germany) Steffi Graf |
| 1993^{★} | (West Germany) Steffi Graf |
| 1995^{★} | (West Germany) Steffi Graf |
| 1996^{★} | (West Germany) Steffi Graf |
| 2002^{★} | (United States) Serena Williams |

=== Two titles ===
● Three-Quarter Slam (3 major titles in the same season).
‡ Channel Slam (French and Wimbledon title double).

Australian—French
| 1953^{♠} | (United States) Maureen Connolly |
| 1962^{●} | (Australia) Margaret Court |
| 1964 | (Australia) Margaret Court |
**Open Era**
| 1969^{●} | (Australia) Margaret Court |
| 1970^{♠} | (Australia) Margaret Court |
| 1973^{●} | (Australia) Margaret Court |
| 1988^{♠} | (West Germany) Steffi Graf |
| 1991^{●} | (Socialist Federal Republic of Yugoslavia) / (Serbia and Montenegro) Monica Seles |
| 1992^{●} | (Socialist Federal Republic of Yugoslavia) / (Serbia and Montenegro) Monica Seles |
| 2001 | (United States) Jennifer Capriati |
| 2015^{●} | (United States) Serena Williams |

| class="col-break " style=" padding-left: 1em;" |

Australian—Wimbledon
| 1950 | (United States) Louise Brough |
| 1953^{♠} | (United States) Maureen Connolly |
| 1963 | (Australia) Margaret Court |
| 1965^{●} | (Australia) Margaret Court |
| 1968 | (United States) Billie Jean King |
**Open Era**
| 1970^{♠} | (Australia) Margaret Court |
| 1983^{●} | (United States) Martina Navratilova |
| 1985 | (United States) Martina Navratilova |
| 1988^{♠} | (West Germany) Steffi Graf |
| 1989^{●} | (West Germany) Steffi Graf |
| 1997^{●} | (Switzerland) Martina Hingis |
| 2003 | (United States) Serena Williams |
| 2006 | (France) Amélie Mauresmo |
| 2009 | (United States) Serena Williams |
| 2010 | (United States) Serena Williams |
| 2015^{●} | (United States) Serena Williams |

Australian—U.S.
| 1953^{♠} | (United States) Maureen Connolly |
| 1962^{●} | (Australia) Margaret Court |
| 1965^{●} | (Australia) Margaret Court |
**Open Era**
| 1969^{●} | (Australia) Margaret Court |
| 1970^{♠} | (Australia) Margaret Court |
| 1973^{●} | (Australia) Margaret Court |
| 1982 | (United States) Chris Evert |
| 1983^{●} | (United States) Martina Navratilova |
| 1988^{♠} | (West Germany) Steffi Graf |
| 1989^{●} | (West Germany) Steffi Graf |
| 1991^{●} | (Socialist Federal Republic of Yugoslavia) / (Serbia and Montenegro) Monica Seles |
| 1992^{●} | (Socialist Federal Republic of Yugoslavia) / (Serbia and Montenegro) Monica Seles |
| 1997^{●} | (Switzerland) Martina Hingis |
| 2016 | (Germany) Angelique Kerber |
| 2024 | Aryna Sabalenka (Note: On 1 March 2022, the WTA announced that players from Belarus will not be allowed to compete under the name or flag of Belarus following the 2022 Russian invasion of Ukraine. Aryna Sabalenka thus competed as neutral player since then and her four titles are not attributed to Belarus in the "Grand Slam titles by country" list.) |
| 2026 | (Kazakhstan) Elena Rybakina |

French—Wimbledon ‡
| 1925 | (France) Suzanne Lenglen |
| 1928^{●} | (United States) Helen Wills |
| 1929^{●} | (United States) Helen Wills |
| 1930 | (United States) Helen Wills |
| 1932 | (United States) Helen Wills |
| 1953^{♠} | (United States) Maureen Connolly |
| 1954 | (United States) Maureen Connolly |
**Open Era**
| 1970^{♠} | (Australia) Margaret Court |
| 1971 | (Australia) Evonne Goolagong |
| 1972^{●} | (United States) Billie Jean King |
| 1974 | (United States) Chris Evert |
| 1982 | (United States) Martina Navratilova |
| 1984^{●} | (United States) Martina Navratilova |
| 1988^{♠} | (West Germany) Steffi Graf |
| 1993^{●} | (West Germany) Steffi Graf |
| 1995^{●} | (West Germany) Steffi Graf |
| 1996^{●} | (West Germany) Steffi Graf |
| 2002^{●} | (United States) Serena Williams |
| 2015^{●} | (United States) Serena Williams |

French—U.S.
| 1928^{●} | (United States) Helen Wills |
| 1929^{●} | (United States) Helen Wills |
| 1949 | (United States) Margaret Osborne |
| 1953^{♠} | (United States) Maureen Connolly |
| 1960 | (United States) Darlene Hard |
| 1962^{●} | (Australia) Margaret Court |
**Open Era**
| 1969^{●} | (Australia) Margaret Court |
| 1970^{♠} | (Australia) Margaret Court |
| 1972^{●} | (United States) Billie Jean King |
| 1973^{●} | (Australia) Margaret Court |
| 1975 | (United States) Chris Evert |
| 1980 | (United States) Chris Evert |
| 1984^{●} | (United States) Martina Navratilova |
| 1988^{♠} | (West Germany) Steffi Graf |
| 1991^{●} | (Socialist Federal Republic of Yugoslavia) / (Serbia and Montenegro) Monica Seles |
| 1992^{●} | (Socialist Federal Republic of Yugoslavia) / (Serbia and Montenegro) Monica Seles |
| 1993^{●} | (West Germany) Steffi Graf |
| 1994 | (Spain) Arantxa Sánchez Vicario |
| 1995^{●} | (West Germany) Steffi Graf |
| 1996^{●} | (West Germany) Steffi Graf |
| 2002^{●} | (United States) Serena Williams |
| 2003 | (Belgium) Justine Henin |
| 2007 | (Belgium) Justine Henin |
| 2013 | (United States) Serena Williams |
| 2022 | (Poland) Iga Świątek |

Wimbledon—U.S.
| 1928^{●} | (United States) Helen Wills |
| 1929^{●} | (United States) Helen Wills |
| 1939 | (United States) Alice Marble |
| 1946 | (United States) Pauline Betz |
| 1952 | (United States) Maureen Connolly |
| 1953^{♠} | (United States) Maureen Connolly |
| 1956 | (United States) Shirley Fry |
| 1957 | (United States) Althea Gibson |
| 1958 | (United States) Althea Gibson |
| 1959 | (Brazil) Maria Bueno |
| 1964 | (Brazil) Maria Bueno |
| 1965^{●} | (Australia) Margaret Court |
| 1967 | (United States) Billie Jean King |
**Open Era**
| 1970^{♠} | (Australia) Margaret Court |
| 1972^{●} | (United States) Billie Jean King |
| 1976 | (United States) Chris Evert |
| 1983^{●} | (United States) Martina Navratilova |
| 1984^{●} | (United States) Martina Navratilova |
| 1986 | (United States) Martina Navratilova |
| 1987 | (United States) Martina Navratilova |
| 1988^{♠} | (West Germany) Steffi Graf |
| 1989^{●} | (West Germany) Steffi Graf |
| 1993^{●} | (West Germany) Steffi Graf |
| 1995^{●} | (West Germany) Steffi Graf |
| 1996^{●} | (West Germany) Steffi Graf |
| 1997^{●} | (Switzerland) Martina Hingis |
| 2000 | (United States) Venus Williams |
| 2001 | (United States) Venus Williams |
| 2002^{●} | (United States) Serena Williams |
| 2012 | (United States) Serena Williams |

== Tournament statistics ==
=== Most titles per tournament ===
| Grand Slam | Titles | Player |
|---|---|---|
| **Australian Open** | 11 | (Australia) Margaret Court |
| **French Open** | 7 | (United States) Chris Evert |
| **Wimbledon** | 9 | (United States) Martina Navratilova |
| **US Open** | 8 | (Norway) / (United States) Molla Mallory |

== Consecutive titles ==
| AO Australian Open | WIM Wimbledon |
| FO French Open | USO US Open |

=== Overall record ===
| Titles | Player | First event | Last event |
|---|---|---|---|
| 6 | (United States) Maureen Connolly | 1952 WIM | 1953 USO |
| 6 | (Australia) Margaret Court | 1969 USO | 1971 AO |
| 6 | (United States) Martina Navratilova (Note: Australian Open was held in December from 1977 through 1985.) | 1983 WIM | 1984 USO |
| 5 | (West Germany) Steffi Graf | 1988 AO | 1989 AO |
| 4 | (Germany) Steffi Graf (2) | 1993 FO | 1994 AO |
| 4 | (United States) Serena Williams | 2002 FO | 2003 AO |
| 4 | (United States) Serena Williams | 2014 USO | 2015 WIM |
| 3 | (United States) Helen Wills Moody | 1928 FO | 1928 USO |
| 3 | (United States) Helen Wills Moody | 1929 FO | 1929 USO |
| 3 | (Australia) Margaret Court (2) | 1965 WIM | 1966 AO |
| 3 | (United States) Billie Jean King | 1967 WIM | 1968 AO |
| 3 | (United States) Billie Jean King | 1972 FO | 1972 USO |
| 3 | (United States) Chris Evert | 1982 USO | 1983 FO |
| 3 | (West Germany) Steffi Graf (3) | 1989 WIM | 1990 AO |
| 3 | (Socialist Federal Republic of Yugoslavia) / (Serbia and Montenegro) Monica Seles | 1991 USO | 1992 FO |
| 3 | (Germany) Steffi Graf (4) | 1995 FO | 1995 USO |
| 3 | (Germany) Steffi Graf (4) | 1996 FO | 1996 USO |
| 3 | (Switzerland) Martina Hingis | 1997 WIM | 1998 AO |

=== At one tournament ===
| Titles | Player | Tourn. | Years |
|---|---|---|---|
| 7 | (Australia) Margaret Court | AO | 1960–66 |
| 6 | (United States) Martina Navratilova | WIM | 1982–87 |
| 5 | (France) Suzanne Lenglen | WIM | 1919–23 |
| 4 | (Norway) Molla Mallory | USO | 1915–18 |
| 4 | (United States) Helen Wills Moody | WIM | 1927–30 |
| 4 | (United States) Helen Jacobs | USO | 1932–35 |
| 4 | (United States) Chris Evert | USO | 1975–78 |

== Grand Slam titles by country ==
=== All-time ===
as of 2026 US Open.

| 206 | United States (46 players) |

| 65 | Australia (18 players) |

| 52 | Great Britain (21 players) |

| 27 | Germany / West Germany (3 players) |

| 17 | France (7 players) |

| 11 | Belgium (2 players), Czechoslovakia / Czech Republic (6 players) |

| 10 | Yugoslavia / FR Yugoslavia / Serbia (3 players) |

| 8 | Russia (3 players) (Note: On 1 March 2022, the WTA announced that players from Russia will be not be allowed to compete under the name or flag of Russia following the 2022 Russian invasion of Ukraine. Mirra Andreeva thus competed as neutral player since then and her first and only title is not attributed to Russia in the "Grand Slam titles by country" list.) |

| 7 | Brazil (1 player), Spain (3 players) |

| 6 | Poland (1 player) |

| 5 | Switzerland (1 player) |

| 4 | Denmark (2 players), Japan (1 player), Norway (1 player) |

| 3 | Kazakhstan (1 player), Romania (2 players) |

| 2 | Belarus (1 player) (Note: On 1 March 2022, the WTA announced that players from Belarus will be not be allowed to compete under the name or flag of Belarus following the 2022 Russian invasion of Ukraine. Aryna Sabalenka thus competed as neutral player since then and her four titles are not attributed to Belarus in the "Grand Slam titles by country" list.), China (1 player), Italy (2 players) |

| 1 | Argentina, Canada, Chile, Croatia, Hungary, Latvia, Netherlands |

=== Open Era ===
as of 2026 US Open.

| 90 | United States (15 players) |

| 25 | West Germany / Germany (2 players) |

| 24 | Australia (6 players) |

| 11 | Belgium (2 players), Czechoslovakia / Czech Republic (6 players) |

| 10 | Yugoslavia / FR Yugoslavia / Serbia (3 players) |

| 8 | Russia (3 players) |

| 7 | Spain (3 players) |

| 6 | Great Britain (4 players), Poland (1 player) |

| 5 | France (3 players), Switzerland (1 player) |

| 4 | Japan (1 player) |

| 3 | Kazakhstan (1 player), Romania (2 players) |

| 2 | Belarus (1 player), China (1 player), Italy (2 players) |

| 1 | Argentina, Canada, Croatia, Denmark Latvia |

== See also ==
=== List of Grand Slam records lists ===
- Chronological list of women's Grand Slam tennis champions
- List of Grand Slam women's singles finals
- List of Grand Slam–related tennis records
- List of WTA Tour top-level tournament singles champions
- Lists of tennis records and statistics

=== List of Grand Slam champions ===
- List of Grand Slam men's singles champions
- List of Grand Slam men's doubles champions
- List of Grand Slam women's doubles champions
- List of Grand Slam mixed doubles champions
- List of Grand Slam boys' singles champions
- List of Grand Slam girls' singles champions
- List of wheelchair tennis champions
