= List of French Open women's singles champions =

French Open women's singles champions
- Location: Paris; France
- Venue: Stade Roland Garros
- Governing body: French Tennis Federation
- Created: 1897 (established); 1925 (Grand Slam event)
- Editions: 125 events (2025); 96 Grand Slam events (since 1925); 59 events (Open Era)
- Surface: Clay (red) (1897–present); Sand (1897–1908, when held at Île de Puteaux)
- Prize money: € 2,550,000 (2025)
- Trophy: Coupe Suzanne Lenglen
- Website: rolandgarros.com/en-us/palmares

Most titles
- 7: Chris Evert

Current champion
- Mirra Andreeva (First title)

The French Open, (Note: Known as the Les Championnats de France (1891–1924) then Les Championnats internationaux de France (1925–1967) during the Amateur Era.) (Note: The tournament entered the Open Era with the 1968 event, when professional players were allowed to compete alongside amateurs.) known originally as the Internationaux de France, is an annual tennis tournament created in 1891 and played on outdoor red clay courts at the Stade Roland Garros in Paris. The women's singles event began in 1897.

== History ==
The French Open is played during two weeks in late May and early June, and has been chronologically the second of the four Grand Slam tournaments of the tennis season since 1987. The event was not held from 1915 to 1919 because of World War I, and after a one-year lapse in 1940, was unofficially held from 1941 to 1945 because of World War II. The national body that organizes this event is the French Tennis Federation (FFT).

The Racing Club de France and the Stade Français of Paris alternated hosting the event before the competition was moved in 1928 to the newly built Stade Roland Garros, where it has been played since. The tournament was reserved for members of French tennis clubs until the first edition open to international players took place in 1925. From 1941 to 1944, the tournament took place under Vichy regime, won two times by Alice Weiwers and once by Simone Iribarne Lafargue, and Raymonde Jones Veber. Those editions are not counted by the FFT in the tournament's history, and were retroactively named Tournoi de France. In 1945, under the Provisional Government of the French Republic, the champion was Lolette Payot-Dodille. Even if it was organised by the French Lawn Tennis Federation, the 1945 event is also not counted by the FFT in the tournament's history.

The women's singles rules have undergone several changes since the first edition. The event has always been contested in a knockout format. Records show that matches have always been played as the best-of-three sets format. The lingering death best-of-twelve points tie-break was introduced in 1973 for the first two sets.

The champion receives a miniature replica of the Coupe Suzanne Lenglen (Suzanne Lenglen Cup), named after Suzanne Lenglen. In 2010, the winner received prize money of €1,120,000.

In the French National Championship, which was when the tournament was reserved to members of French tennis clubs and French nationals, Adine Masson (1897–1899, 1902–1903) holds the record for most titles in women's singles with five victories. The record for most consecutive titles is four by Jeanne Matthey (1909–1912) and Lenglen (1920–1923), all of whose titles came during the club-members-only era.

In the French International Championships, that came after the tournament opened to international competitors but before the open era, Helen Wills Moody (1928–1930, 1932) holds the record for most titles at four. The record for most consecutive titles during this period is three by Wills Moody (1928–1930) and Hilde Krahwinkel Sperling (1935–1937).

During the French Open, since the inclusion of the professional tennis players, the record for most titles is held by Chris Evert with seven (1974–1975, 1979–1980, 1983, 1985–1986). The record for most consecutive titles during the Open Era is three by Monica Seles (1990–1992), Justine Henin (2005–2007) and Iga Świątek (2022-2024).

This event has been won without losing a set in the Open Era by Evonne Goolagong in 1971, Billie Jean King in 1972, Evert in 1974, Steffi Graf in 1988, Arantxa Sánchez Vicario in 1994, Henin in 2006 and 2007, and Iga Świątek in 2020.

== Champions ==
Regular competition
† Not considered to be a Grand Slam event. A French club members only-tournament.
†† Disputed champions: Not considered to be a Grand Slam event. Not sanctioned or recognised by the FFT (Note: Due to World War II, the tournaments held from 1941 to 1945 are not officially recognized by the Fédération Française de Tennis. Consequently, despite being listed by a few sources, the champions from those years are not included in the official statistics. They are listed here as a historical note.)
Further information: Tournoi de France

=== French Championships ===
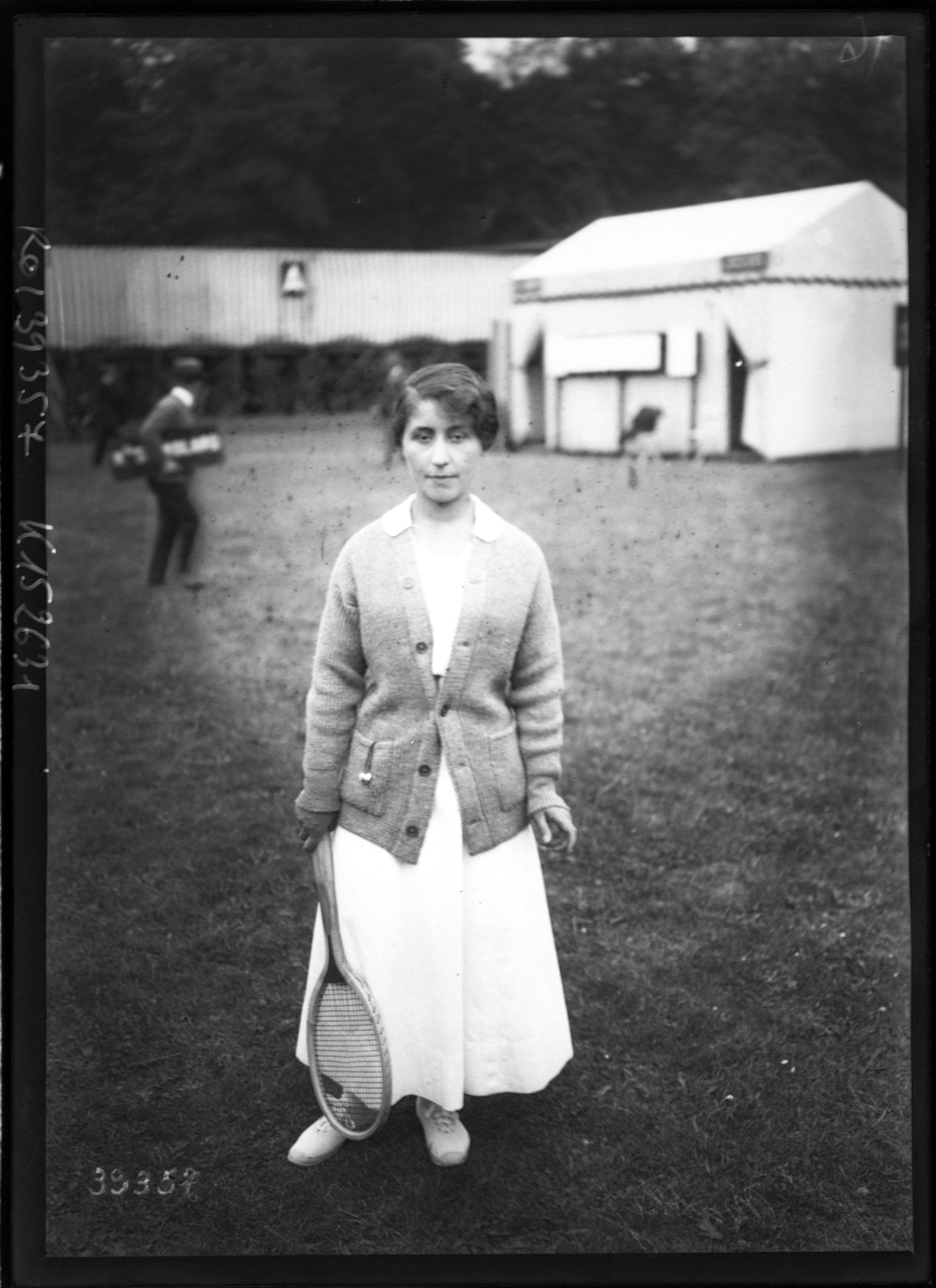
Jeanne Matthey is a four-time champion

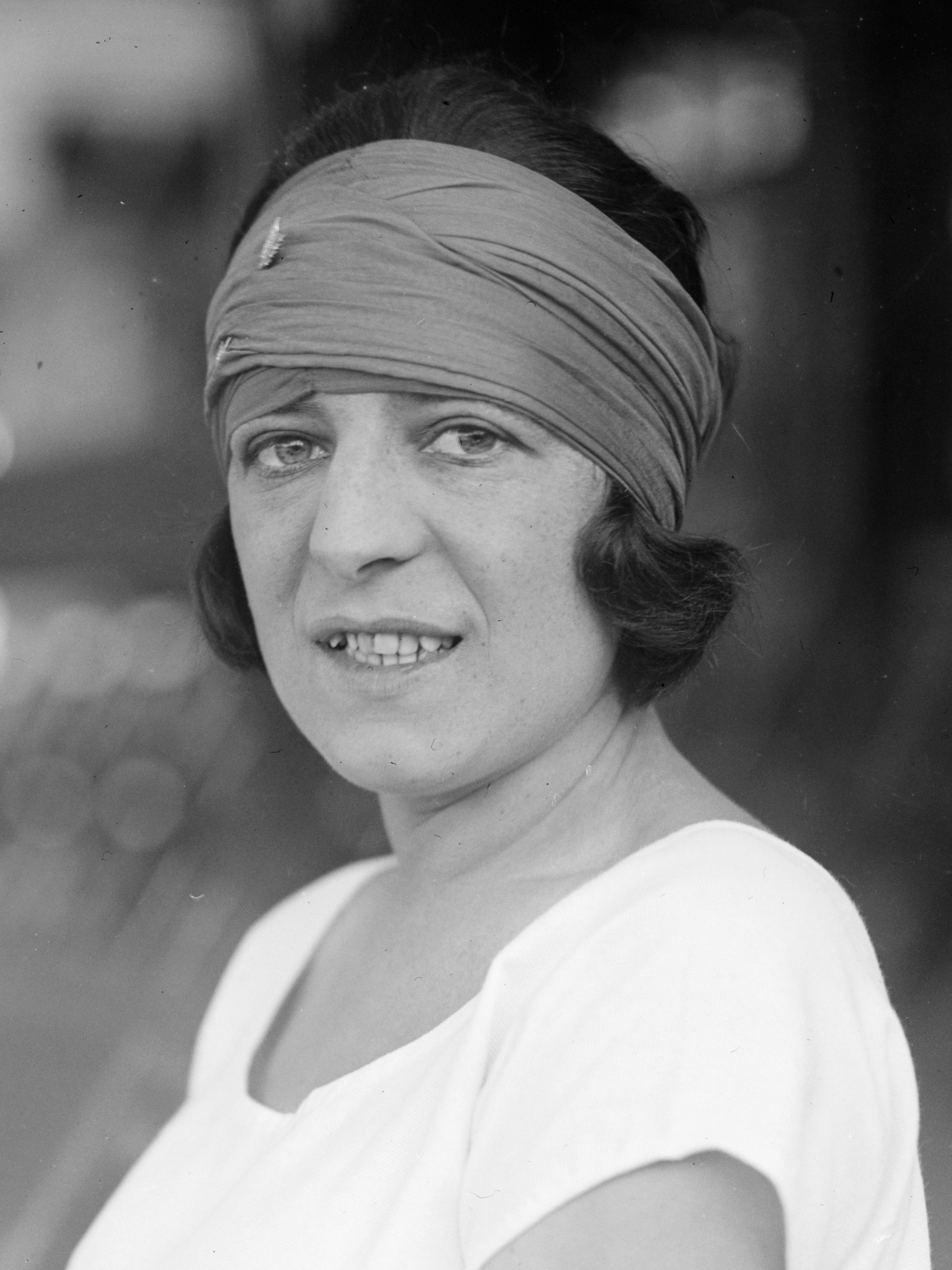
Suzanne Lenglen is a six-time champion

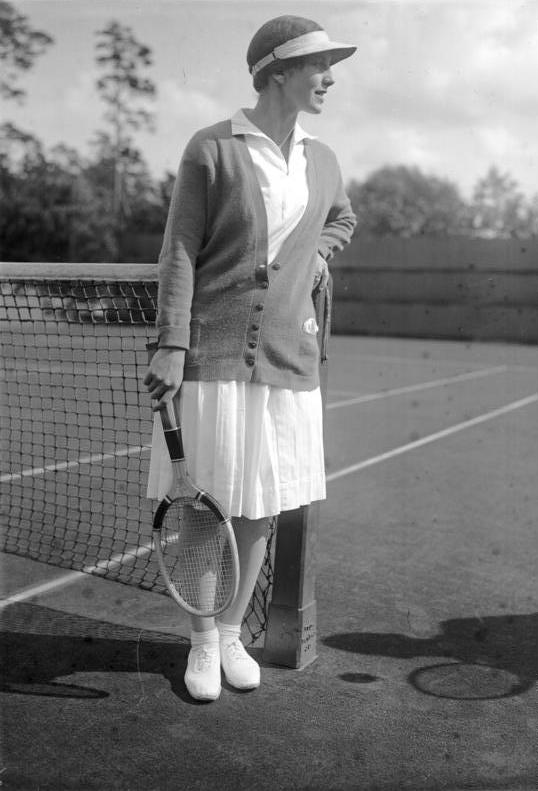
Helen Wills Moody is a four-time champion

| Year (Note: Each year is linked to an article about that particular years draw, with the exception of pre-1925 years.) | Country | Champion | Country | Runner-up | Score in the final |
|---|---|---|---|---|---|
| 1897 | FRA | Adine Masson (1/5) † | FRA | Suzanne Girod | 6–3, 6–1 |
| 1898 | FRA | Adine Masson (2/5) † | FRA | — | Only entrant (no final) (Note: Unchallenged champion (the only entrant into the final challenge round, declared the champion without a contest).) |
| 1899 | FRA | Adine Masson (3/5) † | FRA | — | Only entrant (no final) |
| 1900 | FRA | Yvonne Prévost † | FRA | — | Only entrant (no final) |
| 1901 | FRA | Suzanne Girod † | FRA | Leroux | 6–1, 6–1 |
| 1902 | FRA | Adine Masson (4/5) † | FRA | Suzanne Girod | 6–0, 6–1 |
| 1903 | FRA | Adine Masson (5/5) † | FRA | Kate Gillou | 6–0, 6–8, 6–0 |
| 1904 | FRA | Kate Gillou (1/4) † | FRA | Adine Masson | — |
| 1905 | FRA | Kate Gillou (2/4) † | FRA | Yvonne de Pfeffel | 6–0, 11–9 |
| 1906 | FRA | Kate Gillou-Fenwick (3/4) † | USA | Virginia MacVeagh | 3-6, 7-5, 6-1 |
| 1907 | FRA | Comtesse de Kermel † | FRA | Catherine d'Aliney d'Elva | 6–1, retired |
| 1908 | FRA | Kate Gillou-Fenwick (4/4) † | FRA | Adrienne Péan | 6–2, 6–2 |
| 1909 | FRA | Jeanne Matthey (1/4) † | FRA | Abeille Villard-Gallay | 10–8, 6–4 |
| 1910 | FRA | Jeanne Matthey (2/4) † | FRA | Germaine Régnier | 1–6, 6–1, 9–7 |
| 1911 | FRA | Jeanne Matthey (3/4) † | FRA | Marguerite Broquedis | 6–2, 7–5 |
| 1912 | FRA | Jeanne Matthey (4/4) † | FRA | Marie Danet | 6–2, 7–5 |
| 1913 | FRA | Marguerite Broquedis (1/2) † | FRA | Jeanne Matthey | 6–3, 6–3 |
| 1914 | FRA | Marguerite Broquedis (2/2) † | FRA | Suzanne Lenglen | 5–7, 6–4, 6–3 |
| 1915 | No competition (due to World War I) (Note: The tournament was not held from 1915 to 1919 because of World War I.) | | | | |
| 1916 | No competition (due to World War I) | | | | |
| 1917 | No competition (due to World War I) | | | | |
| 1918 | No competition (due to World War I) | | | | |
| 1919 | No competition (due to World War I) | | | | |
| 1920 | FRA | Suzanne Lenglen (1/6) † | FRA | Marguerite Broquedis | 6–1, 7–5 |
| 1921 | FRA | Suzanne Lenglen (2/6) † | FRA | Germaine Golding | (walkover) |
| 1922 | FRA | Suzanne Lenglen (3/6) † | FRA | Germaine Golding | 6–4, 6–2 |
| 1923 | FRA | Suzanne Lenglen (4/6) † | FRA | Germaine Golding | 6–1, 6–4 |
| 1924 | FRA | Julie Vlasto † | FRA | Jeanne Vaussard | 6–2, 6–3 |
Grand Slam event (1925–1939)
| 1925 | FRA | Suzanne Lenglen (5/6) | GBR (Note: No wins by a player from the United Kingdom of Great Britain and Ireland (1801–1922), plus many wins by a player(s) from the United Kingdom of Great Britain and Northern Ireland (1922–present).) | Kitty McKane Godfree | 6–1, 6–2 |
| 1926 | FRA | Suzanne Lenglen (6/6) | USA | Mary Browne | 6–1, 6–0 |
| 1927 | NED | Kea Bouman | ZAF | Irene Bowder Peacock | 6–2, 6–4 |
| 1928 | USA | Helen Wills Moody (1/4) | GBR | Eileen Bennett Whittingstall | 6–1, 6–2 |
| 1929 | USA | Helen Wills Moody (2/4) | FRA | Simonne Mathieu | 6–3, 6–4 |
| 1930 | USA | Helen Wills Moody (3/4) | USA | Helen Jacobs | 6–2, 6–1 |
| 1931 | GER | Cilly Aussem | GBR | Betty Nuthall | 8–6, 6–1 |
| 1932 | USA | Helen Wills Moody (4/4) | FRA | Simonne Mathieu | 7–5, 6–1 |
| 1933 | GBR | Margaret Scriven Vivian (1/2) | FRA | Simonne Mathieu | 6–2, 4–6, 6–4 |
| 1934 | GBR | Margaret Scriven Vivian (2/2) | USA | Helen Jacobs | 7–5, 4–6, 6–1 |
| 1935 | DEN | Hilde Krahwinkel Sperling (1/3) | FRA | Simonne Mathieu | 6–2, 6–1 |
| 1936 | DEN | Hilde Krahwinkel Sperling (2/3) | FRA | Simonne Mathieu | 6–3, 6–4 |
| 1937 | DEN | Hilde Krahwinkel Sperling (3/3) | FRA | Simonne Mathieu | 6–2, 6–4 |
| 1938 | FRA | Simonne Mathieu (1/2) | FRA | Nelly Adamson Landry | 6–0, 6–3 |
| 1939 | FRA | Simonne Mathieu (2/2) | POL | Jadwiga Jędrzejowska | 6–3, 8–6 |
| 1940 | No competition (due to World War II) | | | | |
| 1941 | LUX | Alice Weiwers (1/2) †† | FRA | Anne-Marie Seghers | 6–0, 6–2 |
| 1942 | LUX | Alice Weiwers (2/2) †† | FRA | Lolette Payot-Dodille | 6–4, 6–4 |
| 1943 | FRA | Simone Iribarne Lafargue †† | LUX | Alice Weiwers | 6–1, 7–5 |
| 1944 | FRA | Raymonde Jones Veber †† | FRA | Jacqueline Patorni | 6–4, 9–7 |
| 1945 | FRA | Lolette Payot-Dodille †† | FRA | Simone Iribarne Lafargue | 6–3, 6–4 |
| 1946 | USA | Margaret Osborne duPont (1/2) | USA | Pauline Betz | 1–6, 8–6, 7–5 |
| 1947 | USA | Patricia Canning Todd | USA | Doris Hart | 6–3, 3–6, 6–4 |
| 1948 | FRA | Nelly Adamson Landry | USA | Shirley Fry | 6–2, 0–6, 6–0 |
| 1949 | USA | Margaret Osborne duPont (2/2) | FRA | Nelly Adamson Landry | 7–5, 6–2 |
| 1950 | USA | Doris Hart (1/2) | USA | Patricia Canning Todd | 6–4, 4–6, 6–2 |
| 1951 | USA | Shirley Fry | USA | Doris Hart | 6–3, 3–6, 6–3 |
| 1952 | USA | Doris Hart (2/2) | USA | Shirley Fry | 6–4, 6–4 |
| 1953 | USA | Maureen Connolly (1/2) | USA | Doris Hart | 6–2, 6–4 |
| 1954 | USA | Maureen Connolly (2/2) | FRA | Ginette Bucaille | 6–4, 6–1 |
| 1955 | GBR | Angela Mortimer | USA | Dorothy Head Knode | 2–6, 7–5, 10–8 |
| 1956 | USA | Althea Gibson | GBR | Angela Mortimer | 6–0, 12–10 |
| 1957 | GBR | Shirley Bloomer | USA | Dorothy Head Knode | 6–1, 6–3 |
| 1958 | HUN | Zsuzsa Körmöczy | GBR | Shirley Bloomer Brasher | 6–4, 1–6, 6–2 |
| 1959 | GBR | Christine Truman | HUN | Zsuzsa Körmöczy | 6–4, 7–5 |
| 1960 | USA | Darlene Hard | MEX | Yola Ramírez | 6–3, 6–4 |
| 1961 | GBR | Ann Haydon (1/2) | MEX | Yola Ramírez | 6–2, 6–1 |
| 1962 | AUS | Margaret Court (1/5) | AUS | Lesley Turner | 6–3, 3–6, 7–5 |
| 1963 | AUS | Lesley Turner (1/2) | GBR | Ann Haydon Jones | 2–6, 6–3, 7–5 |
| 1964 | AUS | Margaret Court (2/5) | BRA | Maria Bueno | 5–7, 6–1, 6–2 |
| 1965 | AUS | Lesley Turner (2/2) | AUS | Margaret Court | 6–3, 6–4 |
| 1966 | GBR | Ann Haydon Jones (2/2) | USA | Nancy Richey | 6–3, 6–1 |
| 1967 | FRA | Françoise Dürr | AUS | Lesley Turner | 4–6, 6–3, 6–4 |

=== French Open ===
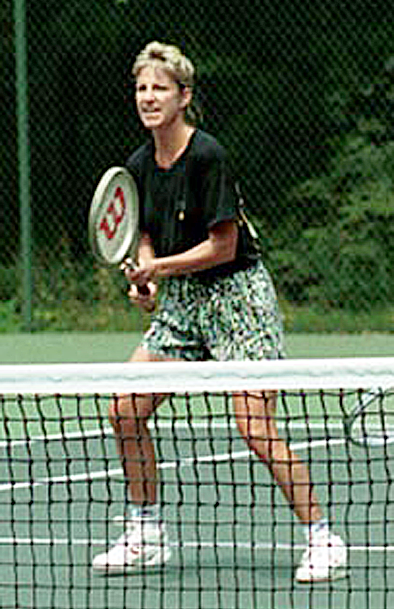
Chris Evert won an Open Era record seven titles over a 13-year period.

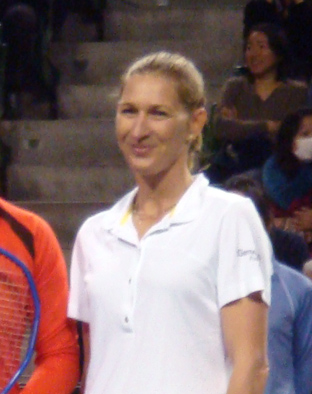
Steffi Graf is a six-time champion.

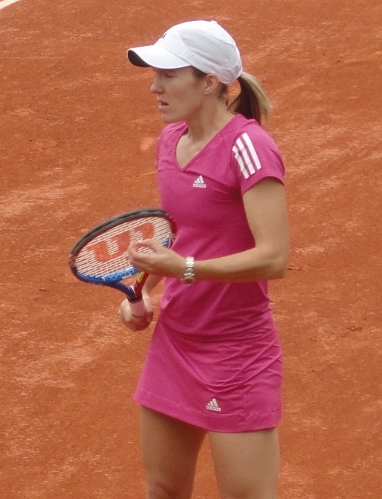
Justine Henin is a four-time champion and won three times consecutively.

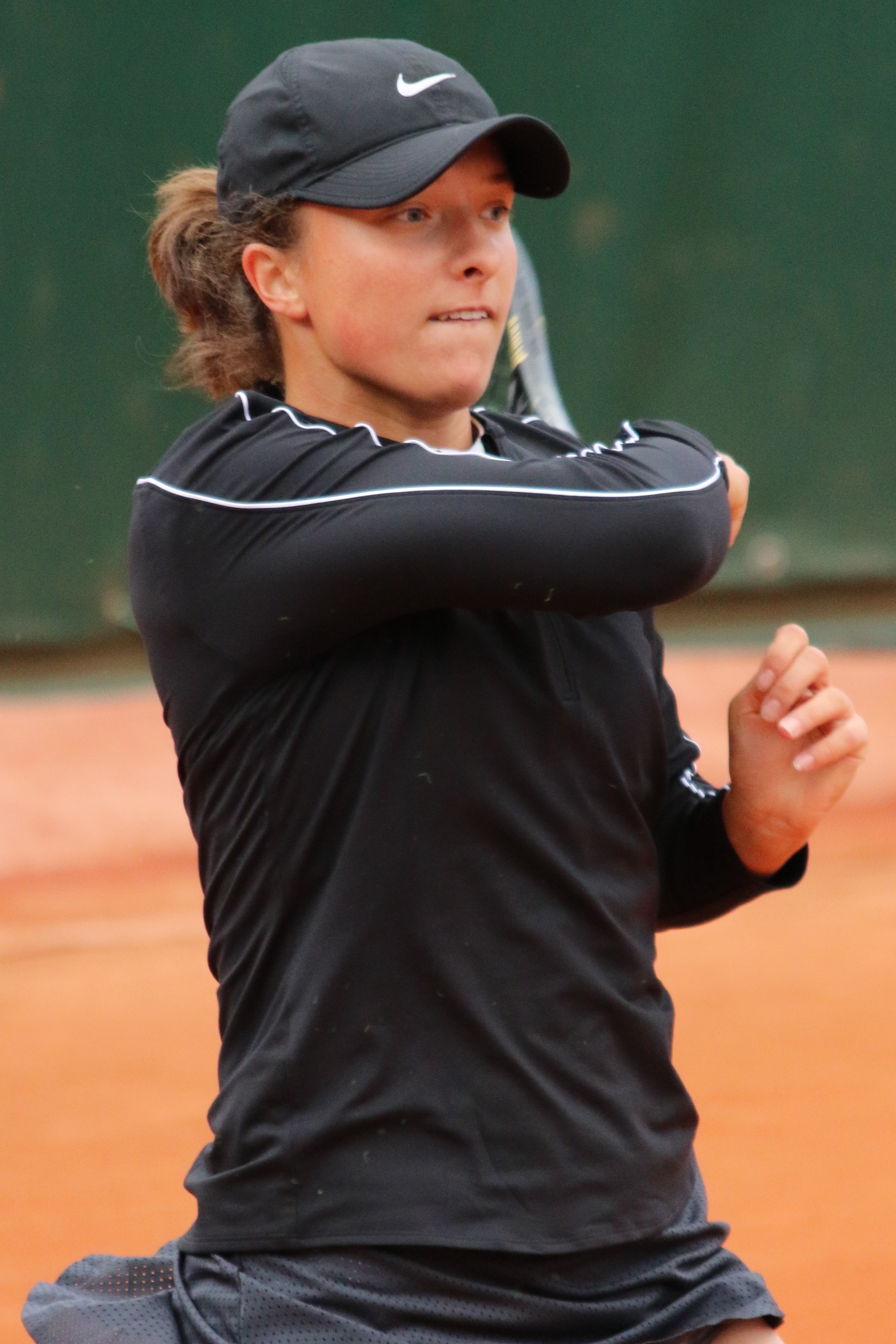
Four-time champion Iga Świątek won her first title in 2020.

| Year | Country | Champion | Country | Runner-up | Score in the final |
|---|---|---|---|---|---|
| 1968 | USA | Nancy Richey | GBR | Ann Haydon Jones | 5–7, 6–4, 6–1 |
| 1969 | AUS | Margaret Court (3/5) | GBR | Ann Haydon Jones | 6–1, 4–6, 6–3 |
| 1970 | AUS | Margaret Court (4/5) | FRG (Note: FRG was West Germany, but after unification in 1990 became just Germany (GER).) | Helga Niessen | 6–2, 6–4 |
| 1971 | AUS | Evonne Goolagong (Note: Evonne Goolagong became Evonne Goolagong Cawley after her marriage to Roger Cawley in 1975, but when she won the 1971 French Open she had not married.) | AUS | Helen Gourlay | 6–3, 7–5 |
| 1972 | USA | Billie Jean King | AUS | Evonne Goolagong | 6–3, 6–3 |
| 1973 | AUS | Margaret Court (5/5) | USA | Chris Evert | 6–7^{(5–7)}, (Note: Set score in parentheses indicates a tiebreaker score.) 7–6^{(8–6)}, 6–4 |
| 1974 | USA | Chris Evert (1/7) | URS | Olga Morozova | 6–1, 6–2 |
| 1975 | USA | Chris Evert (2/7) | TCH (Note: Czechoslovakia (TCH, 1918–1992), does not include the totals of Czech Republic (CZE, 1993–present) and Slovakia (SVK, 1993–present).) | Martina Navratilova (Note: Martina Navratilova was born in Czechoslovakia, but competed as an American after the US Open in 1975, having sought asylum in the United States, which made her relinquish her Czechoslovak citizenship.) | 2–6, 6–2, 6–1 |
| 1976 | GBR (Note: Sue Barker is erroneously listed as an Australian on the trophy.) | Sue Barker | TCH | Renáta Tomanová | 6–2, 0–6, 6–2 |
| 1977 | YUG | Mima Jaušovec | ROU | Florența Mihai | 6–2, 6–7^{(5–7)}, 6–1 |
| 1978 | ROU | Virginia Ruzici | YUG | Mima Jaušovec | 6–2, 6–2 |
| 1979 | USA | Chris Evert (3/7) | AUS | Wendy Turnbull | 6–2, 6–0 |
| 1980 | USA | Chris Evert (4/7) | ROU | Virginia Ruzici | 6–0, 6–3 |
| 1981 | TCH | Hana Mandlíková | FRG | Sylvia Hanika | 6–2, 6–4 |
| 1982 | USA | Martina Navratilova (1/2) | USA | Andrea Jaeger | 7–6^{(8–6)}, 6–1 |
| 1983 | USA | Chris Evert (5/7) | YUG | Mima Jaušovec | 6–1, 6–2 |
| 1984 | USA | Martina Navratilova (2/2) | USA | Chris Evert | 6–3, 6–1 |
| 1985 | USA | Chris Evert (6/7) | USA | Martina Navratilova | 6–3, 6–7^{(4–7)}, 7–5 |
| 1986 | USA | Chris Evert (7/7) | USA | Martina Navratilova | 2–6, 6–3, 6–3 |
| 1987 | FRG | Steffi Graf (1/6) | USA | Martina Navratilova | 6–4, 4–6, 8–6 |
| 1988 | FRG | Steffi Graf (2/6) | URS | Natasha Zvereva | 6–0, 6–0 |
| 1989 | ESP | Arantxa Sánchez Vicario (1/3) | FRG | Steffi Graf | 7–6^{(8–6)}, 3–6, 7–5 |
| 1990 | YUG | Monica Seles (1/3) | FRG | Steffi Graf | 7–6^{(8–6)}, 6–4 |
| 1991 | YUG | Monica Seles (2/3) | ESP | Arantxa Sánchez Vicario | 6–3, 6–4 |
| 1992 | YUG | Monica Seles (3/3) | GER | Steffi Graf | 6–2, 3–6, 10–8 |
| 1993 | GER | Steffi Graf (3/6) | USA | Mary Joe Fernández | 4–6, 6–2, 6–4 |
| 1994 | ESP | Arantxa Sánchez Vicario (2/3) | FRA | Mary Pierce | 6–4, 6–4 |
| 1995 | GER | Steffi Graf (4/6) | ESP | Arantxa Sánchez Vicario | 7–5, 4–6, 6–0 |
| 1996 | GER | Steffi Graf (5/6) | ESP | Arantxa Sánchez Vicario | 6–3, 6–7^{(4–7)}, 10–8 |
| 1997 | CRO | Iva Majoli | SUI | Martina Hingis | 6–4, 6–2 |
| 1998 | ESP | Arantxa Sánchez Vicario (3/3) | USA | Monica Seles | 7–6^{(7–5)}, 0–6, 6–2 |
| 1999 | GER | Steffi Graf (6/6) | SUI | Martina Hingis | 4–6, 7–5, 6–2 |
| 2000 | FRA | Mary Pierce | ESP | Conchita Martínez | 6–2, 7–5 |
| 2001 | USA | Jennifer Capriati | BEL | Kim Clijsters | 1–6, 6–4, 12–10 |
| 2002 | USA | Serena Williams (1/3) | USA | Venus Williams | 7–5, 6–3 |
| 2003 | BEL | Justine Henin (1/4) | BEL | Kim Clijsters | 6–0, 6–4 |
| 2004 | RUS | Anastasia Myskina | RUS | Elena Dementieva | 6–1, 6–2 |
| 2005 | BEL | Justine Henin (2/4) | FRA | Mary Pierce | 6–1, 6–1 |
| 2006 | BEL | Justine Henin (3/4) | RUS | Svetlana Kuznetsova | 6–4, 6–4 |
| 2007 | BEL | Justine Henin (4/4) | SRB | Ana Ivanovic | 6–1, 6–2 |
| 2008 | SRB | Ana Ivanovic | RUS | Dinara Safina | 6–4, 6–3 |
| 2009 | RUS | Svetlana Kuznetsova | RUS | Dinara Safina | 6–4, 6–2 |
| 2010 | ITA | Francesca Schiavone | AUS | Samantha Stosur | 6–4, 7–6^{(7–2)} |
| 2011 | CHN | Li Na | ITA | Francesca Schiavone | 6–4, 7–6^{(7–0)} |
| 2012 | RUS | Maria Sharapova (1/2) | ITA | Sara Errani | 6–3, 6–2 |
| 2013 | USA | Serena Williams (2/3) | RUS | Maria Sharapova | 6–4, 6–4 |
| 2014 | RUS | Maria Sharapova (2/2) | ROU | Simona Halep | 6–4, 6–7^{(5–7)}, 6–4 |
| 2015 | USA | Serena Williams (3/3) | CZE | Lucie Šafářová | 6–3, 6–7^{(2–7)}, 6–2 |
| 2016 | ESP | Garbiñe Muguruza | USA | Serena Williams | 7–5, 6–4 |
| 2017 | LAT | Jeļena Ostapenko | ROU | Simona Halep | 4–6, 6–4, 6–3 |
| 2018 | ROU | Simona Halep | USA | Sloane Stephens | 3–6, 6–4, 6–1 |
| 2019 | AUS | Ashleigh Barty | CZE | Markéta Vondroušová | 6–1, 6–3 |
| 2020 | POL | Iga Świątek (1/4) | USA | Sofia Kenin | 6–4, 6–1 |
| 2021 | CZE | Barbora Krejčíková | RUS | Anastasia Pavlyuchenkova | 6–1, 2–6, 6–4 |
| 2022 | POL | Iga Świątek (2/4) | USA | Coco Gauff | 6–1, 6–3 |
| 2023 | POL | Iga Świątek (3/4) | CZE | Karolína Muchová | 6–2, 5–7, 6–4 |
| 2024 | POL | Iga Świątek (4/4) | ITA | Jasmine Paolini | 6–2, 6–1 |
| 2025 | USA | Coco Gauff | (Note: On 1 March 2022, the WTA announced that until further notice, players from Russia and Belarus would not be allowed to compete under the name or flag of Russia or Belarus following the 2022 Russian invasion of Ukraine. Aryna Sabalenka, who is Belarusian, thus competed under no nationality during this time.) | Aryna Sabalenka | 6–7^{(5–7)}, 6–2, 6–4 |
| 2026 | | Mirra Andreeva | POL | Maja Chwalińska | 6–3, 6–2 |

== Statistics ==
=== Multiple champions ===
Competitions prior to 1925 opened only to French tennis club members and French nationals

| Player | Amateur Era | Open Era | All-time | Years |
|---|---|---|---|---|
| Chris Evert (USA) | 0 | 7 | 7 | 1974, 1975, 1979, 1980, 1983, 1985, 1986 |
| Suzanne Lenglen (FRA) | 6 | 0 | 6 | 1920, 1921, 1922, 1923, 1925, 1926 |
| Steffi Graf (GER) | 0 | 6 | 6 | 1987, 1988, 1993, 1995, 1996, 1999 |
| Adine Masson (FRA) | 5 | 0 | 5 | 1897, 1898, 1899, 1902, 1903 |
| Margaret Court (AUS) | 2 | 3 | 5 | 1962, 1964, 1969, 1970, 1973 |
| Kate Gillou (FRA) | 4 | 0 | 4 | 1904, 1905, 1906, 1908 |
| Jeanne Matthey (FRA) | 4 | 0 | 4 | 1909, 1910, 1911, 1912 |
| Helen Wills (USA) | 4 | 0 | 4 | 1928, 1929, 1930, 1932 |
| Justine Henin (BEL) | 0 | 4 | 4 | 2003, 2005, 2006, 2007 |
| Iga Świątek (POL) | 0 | 4 | 4 | 2020, 2022, 2023, 2024 |
| Hilde Krahwinkel Sperling (DEN) | 3 | 0 | 3 | 1935, 1936, 1937 |
| Arantxa Sánchez Vicario (ESP) | 0 | 3 | 3 | 1989, 1994, 1998 |
| Monica Seles (YUG) (FRY) | 0 | 3 | 3 | 1990, 1991, 1992 |
| Serena Williams (USA) | 0 | 3 | 3 | 2002, 2013, 2015 |
| Marguerite Broquedis (FRA) | 2 | 0 | 2 | 1913, 1914 |
| Margaret Scriven Vivian (GBR) | 2 | 0 | 2 | 1933, 1934 |
| Simonne Mathieu (FRA) | 2 | 0 | 2 | 1938, 1939 |
| Margaret Osborne duPont (USA) | 2 | 0 | 2 | 1946, 1949 |
| Doris Hart (USA) | 2 | 0 | 2 | 1950, 1952 |
| Maureen Connolly (USA) | 2 | 0 | 2 | 1953, 1954 |
| Ann Haydon Jones (GBR) | 2 | 0 | 2 | 1961, 1966 |
| Lesley Turner Bowrey (AUS) | 2 | 0 | 2 | 1963, 1965 |
| Martina Navratilova (USA) | 0 | 2 | 2 | 1982, 1984 |
| Maria Sharapova (RUS) | 0 | 2 | 2 | 2012, 2014 |

=== Champions by country ===
| Country | Amateur Era | Open Era | All-time | First title | Last title |
|---|---|---|---|---|---|
| France (FRA) | 29 | 1 | 30 | 1897 | 2000 |
| United States (USA) | 14 | 16 | 30 | 1928 | 2025 |
| Germany (GER) | 1 | 6 | 7 | 1931 | 1999 |
| Australia (AUS) | 4 | 5 | 9 | 1962 | 2019 |
| Great Britain (GBR) | 7 | 1 | 8 | 1933 | 1976 |
| Yugoslavia (YUG); Yugoslavia (FRY); Serbia (SRB) | 0 | 5 | 5 | 1977 | 2008 |
| Poland (POL) | 0 | 4 | 4 | 2020 | 2024 |
| Russia (RUS) | 0 | 4 | 4 | 2004 | 2014 |
| Belgium (BEL) | 0 | 4 | 4 | 2003 | 2007 |
| Spain (ESP) | 0 | 4 | 4 | 1989 | 2016 |
| Denmark (DEN) | 3 | 0 | 3 | 1933 | 1935 |
| Czechoslovakia (TCH); Czech Republic (CZE) | 0 | 2 | 2 | 1981 | 2021 |
| Romania (ROU) | 0 | 2 | 2 | 1978 | 2018 |
| Netherlands (NED) | 1 | 0 | 1 | 1927 | 1927 |
| Hungary (HUN) | 1 | 0 | 1 | 1958 | 1958 |
| Croatia (CRO) | 0 | 1 | 1 | 1997 | 1997 |
| Italy (ITA) | 0 | 1 | 1 | 2010 | 2010 |
| China (CHN) | 0 | 1 | 1 | 2011 | 2011 |
| Latvia (LAT) | 0 | 1 | 1 | 2017 | 2017 |

== See also ==
French Open other competitions

- List of French Open men's singles champions
- List of French Open men's doubles champions
- List of French Open women's doubles champions
- List of French Open mixed doubles champions

Grand Slam women's singles

- List of Australian Open women's singles champions
- List of Wimbledon ladies' singles champions
- List of US Open women's singles champions
- List of Grand Slam women's singles champions
