= Comtesse de Kermel =

French tennis player

Comtesse de Kermel (the Countess of Kermel) or Thérèse de Kermel, née Thérèse Villard (15 June 1874 – 1955) was a French tennis player at the beginning of the 20th century. She won the French Championships in singles in 1907 over runner up Mlle d'Elva.

== Biography ==
She was born Therese Villard on 15 June 1874 and in September 1899 she married Count Olivier de Kermel in Paris, France. In the finals of the closed French Championships in 1907, the countess won the first set, 6–1, before Mlle d'Elva was forced to retire.
