= Suzanne Girod =

French tennis player (1871–1926)

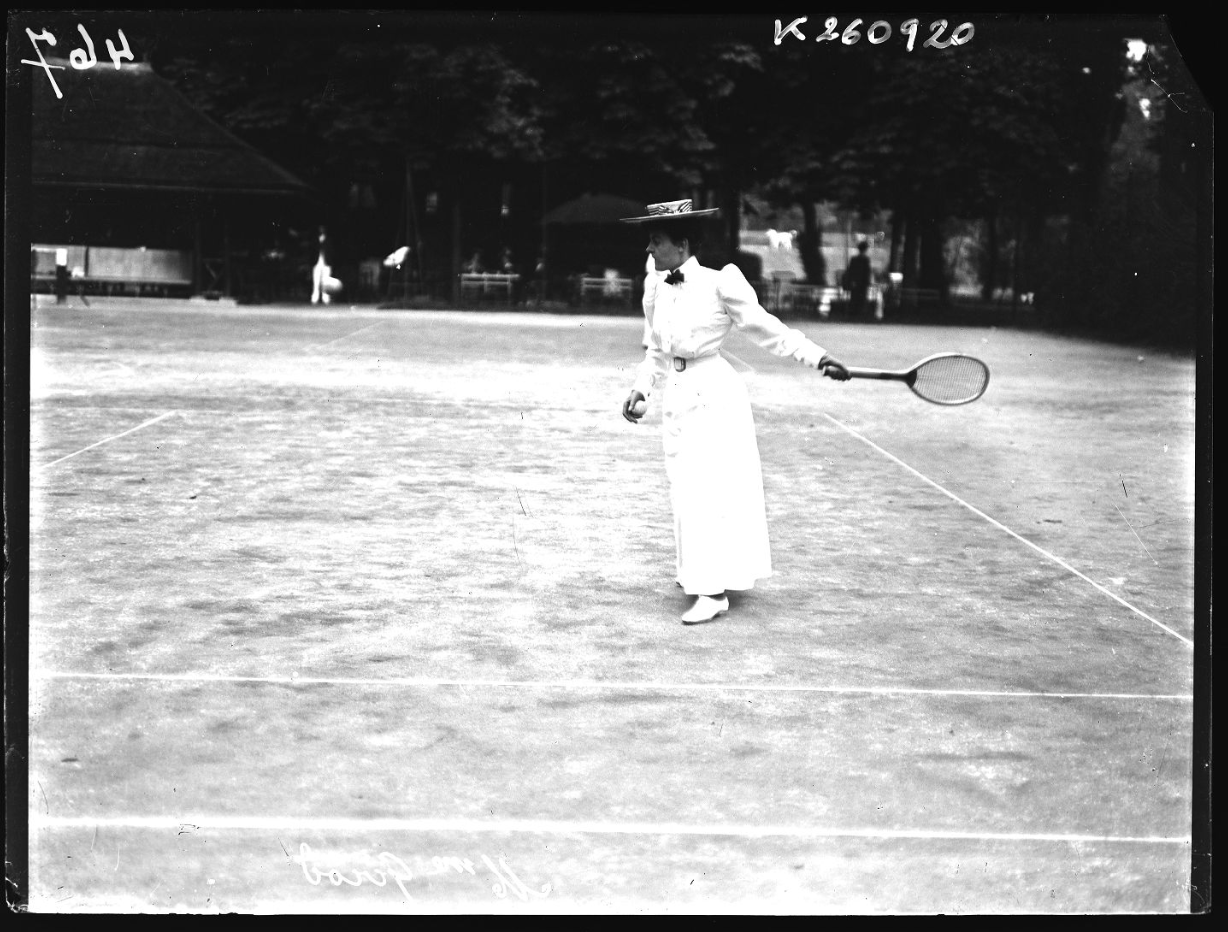
Suzanne Girod in 1905 at the l'île de Puteaux

Suzanne Richardine Girod (née Poirson; 8 July 1871 - 20 October 1926) was a French tennis player. She became the singles winner of the French tennis championships at Roland Garros in 1901 when she defeated Mrs. Leroux in the final. She was runner-up in 1897 and 1902 to Adine Masson.

Frequenting the worldly venues of Île de Puteaux (notable for hosting tennis events played during the 1900 Paris Olympics), "Madame Girod" was known for playing tennis with gloves, purportedly to avoid getting tanned.
