= 1951 in tennis =

This page covers all the important events in the sport of tennis in 1951. It provides the results of notable tournaments throughout the year on both the men's and women's ILTF tennis circuits.

== Australian Open ==
Category	Champion(s)	Finalist(s)	Score
Men's singles	(United States) Dick Savitt	(Australia) Ken McGregor	6–3, 2–6, 6–3, 6–1
Women's singles	(Australia) Nancye Wynne Bolton	(Australia) Thelma Coyne Long	6–1, 7–5
Men's doubles	(Australia) Ken McGregor (Australia) Frank Sedgman	(Australia) John Bromwich (Australia) Adrian Quist	11–9, 2–6, 6–3, 4–6, 6–3
Women's doubles	(Australia) Thelma Coyne Long (Australia) Nancye Wynne Bolton	(Australia) Joyce Fitch (Australia) Mary Bevis Hawton	6–2, 6–1
Mixed doubles	(Australia) Thelma Coyne Long (Australia) George Worthington	(Australia) Clare Proctor (Australia) Jack May	6–4, 6–3

== French Open ==
Category	Champion(s)	Finalist(s)	Score
Men's singles	(Egypt) Jaroslav Drobný	(South Africa) Eric Sturgess	6–3, 6–3, 6–3
Women's singles	(United States) Shirley Fry	(United States) Doris Hart	6–3, 3–6, 6–3
Men's doubles	(Australia) Ken McGregor (Australia) Frank Sedgman	(United States) Gardnar Mulloy (United States) Dick Savitt	6–2, 2–6, 9–7, 7–5
Women's doubles	(United States) Shirley Fry (United States) Doris Hart	(South Africa) Beryl Bartlett (United States) Barbara Scofield	10–8, 6–3
Mixed doubles	(United States) Doris Hart (Australia) Frank Sedgman	(Australia) Thelma Coyne Long (Australia) Mervyn Rose	7–5, 6–2

== Wimbledon ==
Category	Champion(s)	Finalist(s)	Score
Men's singles	(United States) Dick Savitt	(Australia) Ken McGregor	6–4, 6–4, 6–4
Women's singles	(United States) Doris Hart	(United States) Shirley Fry	6–1, 6–0
Men's doubles	(Australia) Ken McGregor (Australia) Frank Sedgman	(Egypt) Jaroslav Drobný (South Africa) Eric Sturgess	3–6, 6–2, 6–3, 3–6, 6–3
Women's doubles	(United States) Shirley Fry (United States) Doris Hart	(United States) Louise Brough (United States) Margaret duPont	6–3, 13–11
Mixed doubles	(Australia) Frank Sedgman (United States) Doris Hart	(Australia) Mervyn Rose (Australia) Nancye Bolton	7–5, 6–2

== US Open ==
Category	Champion(s)	Finalist(s)	Score
Men's singles	(Australia) Frank Sedgman	(United States) Vic Seixas	6–4, 6–1, 6–1
Women's singles	(United States) Maureen Connolly	(United States) Shirley Fry	6–3, 1–6, 6–4
Men's doubles	(Australia) Ken McGregor (Australia) Frank Sedgman	(Australia) Don Candy (Australia) Mervyn Rose	10–8, 6–4, 4–6, 7–5
Women's doubles	(United States) Shirley Fry (United States) Doris Hart	(United States) Nancy Chaffee (United States) Patricia Todd	6–4, 6–2
Mixed doubles	(United States) Doris Hart (Australia) Frank Sedgman	(United States) Shirley Fry (Australia) Mervyn Rose	6–3, 6–2
