= 1949 U.S. National Championships – Women's singles =

Women's singles
- 1949 U.S. National Championships

Final
- Champion: (United States) Margaret Osborne duPont
- Runner-up: (United States) Doris Hart
- Score: 6–4, 6–1

Events
Singles	men	women
Doubles	men	women
← 1948 ·	U.S. National Championships	· 1950 →

Second-seeded Margaret Osborne duPont defeated Doris Hart 6–4, 6–1 in the final to win the women's singles tennis title at the 1949 U.S. National Championships.

== Seeds ==
The tournament used two lists of seven players for seeding the women's singles event; one for U.S. players and one for foreign players. Margaret Osborne duPont is the champion; others show in brackets the round in which they were eliminated.

1. (United States) Louise Brough (semifinals)
2. (United States) Margaret Osborne duPont (champion)
3. (United States) Doris Hart (finalist)
4. (United States) Shirley Fry (third round)
5. (United States) Pat Canning Todd (quarterfinals)
6. (United States) Gussy Moran (third round)
7. (United States) Beverly Baker (quarterfinals)
1. (United Kingdom) Betty Hilton (semifinals)
2. (Romania) Magda Rurac (third round)
3. (United Kingdom) Jean Quertier (third round)
4. (United Kingdom) Jean Walker-Smith (third round)
5. (United Kingdom) Kay Tuckey (third round)
6. (United Kingdom) Molly Blair (third round)
7. (Canada) Patricia Macken (first round)

== Draw ==
=== Key ===
- Q = Qualifier
- WC = Wild card
- LL = Lucky loser
- r = Retired

=== Final eight ===
Quarterfinals
1	(United States) Louise Brough	6	2	6
7	(United States) Beverly Baker	1	6	2
3	(United States) Doris Hart	6	6
(United States) Barbara Scofield	2	0
2	(United States) Margaret Osborne duPont	6	10
6	(United States) Pat Canning Todd	3	8
(1)	(United Kingdom) Betty Hilton	6	6
(United States) Helen Perez	2	3

Semifinals
1	(United States) Louise Brough	5	1
3	(United States) Doris Hart	7	6
2	(United States) Margaret Osborne duPont	6	6
(1)	(United Kingdom) Betty Hilton	2	3

Finals
3	(United States) Doris Hart	4	1
2	(United States) Margaret Osborne duPont	6	6

Preceded by 1949 Wimbledon Championships – Women's singles	Grand Slam women's singles	Succeeded by 1950 Australian Championships – Women's singles
