= 1948 in tennis =

This page covers all the important events in the sport of tennis in 1948. It provides the results of notable tournaments throughout the year on both the men's and women's ILTF tennis circuits.

== Australian Open ==
Category	Champion(s)	Finalist(s)	Score
Men's singles	(Australia) Adrian Quist	(Australia) John Bromwich	6–4, 3–6, 6–3, 2–6, 6–3
Women's singles	(Australia) Nancye Wynne Bolton	(Australia) Marie Toomey	6–3, 6–1
Men's doubles	(Australia) John Bromwich (Australia) Adrian Quist	(Australia) Colin Long (Australia) Frank Sedgman	1–6, 3–6, 8–6, 6–3, 8–6
Women's doubles	(Australia) Thelma Coyne Long (Australia) Nancye Wynne Bolton	(Australia) Mary Bevis (Australia) Pat Jones	6–3, 6–3
Mixed doubles	(Australia) Nancye Wynne Bolton (Australia) Colin Long	(Australia) Thelma Coyne Long (Australia) Bill Sidwell	7–5, 4–6, 8–6

== French Open ==
Category	Champion(s)	Finalist(s)	Score
Men's singles	(United States) Frank Parker	(Egypt) Jaroslav Drobný	6–4, 7–5, 5–7, 8–6
Women's singles	(France) Nelly Landry	(United States) Shirley Fry	6–2, 0–6, 6–0
Men's doubles	(Sweden) Lennart Bergelin (Egypt) Jaroslav Drobný	(Australia) Harry Hopman (Australia) Frank Sedgman	8–6, 6–1, 12–10
Women's doubles	(United States) Doris Hart (United States) Pat Canning Todd	(United States) Shirley Fry (United States) Mary Arnold Prentiss	6–4, 6–2
Mixed doubles	(United States) Pat Canning Todd (Egypt) Jaroslav Drobný	(United States) Doris Hart (Australia) Frank Sedgman	6–3, 3–6, 6–3

== Wimbledon ==
Category	Champion(s)	Finalist(s)	Score
Men's singles	(Brazil) Bob Falkenburg	(Australia) John Bromwich	7–5, 0–6, 6–2, 3–6, 7–5
Women's singles	(United States) Louise Brough	(United States) Doris Hart	6–3, 8–6
Men's doubles	(Australia) John Bromwich (Australia) Frank Sedgman	(United States) Tom Brown (United States) Gardnar Mulloy	5–7, 7–5, 7–5, 9–7
Women's doubles	(United States) Louise Brough (United States) Margaret Osborne duPont	(United States) Doris Hart (United States) Patricia Todd	6–3, 3–6, 6–3
Mixed doubles	(Australia) John Bromwich (United States) Louise Brough	(United States) Doris Hart (Australia) Frank Sedgman	6–2, 3–6, 6–3

== US Open ==
Category	Champion(s)	Finalist(s)	Score
Men's singles	(United States) Pancho Gonzales	(South Africa) Eric Sturgess	6–2, 6–3, 14–12
Women's singles	(United States) Margaret Osborne duPont	(United States) Louise Brough	4–6, 6–4, 15–13
Men's doubles	(United States) Gardnar Mulloy (United States) Bill Talbert	(United States) Frank Parker (United States) Ted Schroeder	1–6, 9–7, 6–3, 3–6, 9–7
Women's doubles	(United States) Louise Brough (United States) Margaret Osborne duPont	(United States) Patricia Todd (United States) Doris Hart	6–4, 8–10, 6–1
Mixed doubles	(United States) Louise Brough (United States) Tom Brown	(United States) Margaret Osborne duPont (United States) Bill Talbert	6–4, 6–4
