= 1955 Wightman Cup =

Tennis competition between the US and Great Britain

Details
- Edition: 27th

Champion
- Winning nation: United States

The 1955 Wightman Cup was the 27th edition of the annual women's team tennis competition between the United States and Great Britain. It was held at the Westchester Country Club in Rye, New York in the United States.

United States
6
Westchester Country Club, Rye, New York, United States
August 1955
Grass

Great Britain
1

			1	2	3
1	(United States) (United Kingdom)	Doris Hart; Angela Mortimer	4; 6	6; 1	5; 7
2	(United States) (United Kingdom)	Louise Brough; Shirley Bloomer	6; 2	6; 4
3	(United States) (United Kingdom)	Louise Brough; Angela Mortimer	6; 0	6; 2
4	(United States) (United Kingdom)	Doris Hart; Shirley Bloomer	7; 5	6; 3
5	(United States) (United Kingdom)	Dorothy Head Knode; Angela Buxton	6; 3	6; 3
6	(United States) (United Kingdom)	Louise Brough / Margaret Osborne duPont; Shirley Bloomer / Patricia Ward	6; 3	6; 3
7	(United States) (United Kingdom)	Doris Hart / Shirley Fry; Angela Buxton / Angela Mortimer	3; 6	6; 2	7; 5
