= 1952 Wightman Cup =

International women's tennis competition

Details
- Edition: 24th

Champion
- Winning nation: United States

The 1952 Wightman Cup was the 24th edition of the annual women's team tennis competition between the United States and Great Britain. It was held at the All England Lawn Tennis and Croquet Club in London in England in the United Kingdom.

Great Britain
0
All England Lawn Tennis and Croquet Club, London, England, United Kingdom
1952
Grass

United States
7

			1	2	3
1	(United Kingdom) (United States)	Jean Quertier Rinkel; Doris Hart	3; 6	3; 6
2	(United Kingdom) (United States)	Jean Walker-Smith; Maureen Connolly	6; 3	1; 6	5; 7
3	(United Kingdom) (United States)	Jean Walker-Smith; Doris Hart	5; 7	2; 6
4	(United Kingdom) (United States)	Jean Quertier Rinkel; Maureen Connolly	7; 9	2; 6
5	(United Kingdom) (United States)	Susan Partridge; Shirley Fry	0; 6	6; 8
6	(United Kingdom) (United States)	Helen Fletcher / Jean Quertier Rinkel; Shirley Fry / Doris Hart	6; 8	4; 6
7	(United Kingdom) (United States)	Joy Mottram / Pat Ward; Louise Brough / Maureen Connolly	0; 6	3; 6
