= 1951 Wightman Cup =

International women's tennis competition

Details
- Edition: 23rd

Champion
- Winning nation: United States

The 1951 Wightman Cup was the 23rd edition of the annual women's team tennis competition between the United States and Great Britain. It was held at the Longwood Cricket Club, Chestnut Hills, Massachusetts, United States.

United States
6
Longwood Cricket Club, Chestnut Hill, Massachusetts, United States
August 1951
Grass

Great Britain
1

			1	2	3
1	(United States) (United Kingdom)	Doris Hart; Jean Quertier	6; 4	6; 4
2	(United States) (United Kingdom)	Shirley Fry; Jean Walker-Smith	6; 1	6; 4
3	(United States) (United Kingdom)	Maureen Connolly; Kay Tuckey	6; 1	6; 3
4	(United States) (United Kingdom)	Doris Hart; Jean Walker-Smith	6; 4	2; 6	7; 5
5	(United States) (United Kingdom)	Shirley Fry; Jean Quertier	3; 6	6; 8
6	(United States) (United Kingdom)	Patricia Todd / Nancy Chaffee; Pat Ward / Joy Mottram	7; 5	6; 3
7	(United States) (United Kingdom)	Shirley Fry / Doris Hart; Jean Quertier / Kay Tuckey	6; 3	6; 3
