= 1956 Wightman Cup =

International women's tennis competition

Details
- Edition: 28th

Champion
- Winning nation: United States

The 1956 Wightman Cup was the 28th edition of the annual women's team tennis competition between the United States and Great Britain. It was held at the All England Lawn Tennis and Croquet Club in London in England in the United Kingdom.

Great Britain
2
All England Lawn Tennis and Croquet Club, London, England, United Kingdom
1956
Grass

United States
5

			1	2	3
1	(United Kingdom) (United States)	Angela Mortimer; Louise Brough	6; 3	4; 6	5; 7
2	(United Kingdom) (United States)	Angela Buxton; Shirley Fry	2; 6	8; 6	5; 7
3	(United Kingdom) (United States)	Angela Buxton; Louise Brough	6; 3	3; 6	3; 6
4	(United Kingdom) (United States)	Angela Mortimer; Shirley Fry	6; 4	6; 3
5	(United Kingdom) (United States)	Shirley Bloomer; Dorothy Head Knode	6; 4	6; 4
6	(United Kingdom) (United States)	Shirley Bloomer / Patricia Ward; Beverly Baker Fleitz / Dorothy Head Knode	1; 6	4; 6
7	(United Kingdom) (United States)	Angela Buxton / Angela Mortimer; Louise Brough / Shirley Fry	2; 6	2; 6
