= Jean Walker-Smith =

English tennis player

- Country (sports): United Kingdom
- Born: 17 March 1924; Dulwich, England
- Died: 23 February 2010 (aged 85)
- Plays: Right–handed

Singles
- Highest ranking: No. 5 (1951) (Note: According to John Olliff of The Daily Telegraph)

Grand Slam singles results
- French Open: SF (1951)
- Wimbledon: QF (1949, 1951, 1952)
- US Open: SF (1951)

Doubles

Grand Slam doubles results
- French Open: SF (1951)
- Wimbledon: QF (1949, 1951, 1952)

Grand Slam mixed doubles results
- Wimbledon: 4R (1951)

Team competitions
- Wightman Cup: F (1949, 1950, 1951, 1952)

Jean Barbara Walker-Smith (née Bridger; 17 March 1924 – 23 February 2010) was a female tennis player from England who was active in the late 1940s and 1950s. She reached two Grand Slam semifinals in the singles event and one in doubles, and she achieved a highest singles ranking of world no. 5 in 1951.

== Early life ==
Walker-Smith was educated at Roedean School, a girls boarding school in Brighton. During World War II, she worked in an armaments factory.

== Career ==
Her best singles performances at a Grand Slam tournament came in 1951 when she reached the semifinals of the French Championships and U.S. National Championships. At the French Championships, she was defeated by first-seeded Doris Hart, and at the U.S. Championships, as the top-seeded foreign player, (Note: The tournament used two lists for seeding the women's singles event; one for U.S. players and one for foreign players.) she lost to second-seeded Shirley Fry. Walker-Smith participated in six Wimbledon Championships between 1947 and 1952 and reached the singles quarterfinals of the 1949, 1951 and 1952 editions. During the same years she made it to the quarterfinals of the doubles event, partnering three different countrywomen. At the 1951 French Championship she teamed up with compatriot Jean Quertier and reached the doubles semifinal, losing in straight sets to the eventual champions Shirley Fry and Doris Hart.

With Jean Quertier, she won the doubles title at the Italian Championships in Rome in 1950, defeating Betty Hilton and Kay Tuckey in the final in three sets. Walker-Smith won the South of England Championships grass court tournament in Eastbourne four times; in 1948 and from 1950 until 1952. On all four occasions, she played the final against a compatriot and won in straight sets. She defeated Anne-Marie Seghers in April 1950 to win the singles title at the Monte Carlo Championships. In April 1951, she was singles runner-up to Quertier on the clay courts of the Roehampton tournament and at the end of the month Walker-Smith participated in the British Hard Court Championships in Bournemouth where she was defeated in the final by Doris Hart. She shared the singles title at the Surrey Championships in 1948 with Joan Curry, was a runner-up in 1949 and won the title in 1950, defeating Quertier in the final. At the 1951 British Covered Court Championships, played on wooden courts at the Queen's Club, she was a runner-up to Susan Partridge. At the Irish Open in July 1952, she reached the final, losing in two sets to reigning U.S. and Wimbledon champion Maureen Connolly

Between 1949 and 1952, Walker-Smith was a member of the British team that competed in the Wightman Cup. These editions were all won by the United States.

She was the top-ranked British female player in 1951 and was ranked No. 5 in the world.

In December 1952, Walker-Smith was named one of the leading tennis personalities of the year by the Lawn Tennis Writers' Association of Great Britain.
