= 1949 U.S. National Championships (tennis) =

- Date: August 26 – September 5
- Edition: 69th
- Category: Grand Slam (ILTF)
- Surface: Grass
- Location: Chestnut Hill, Massachusetts; Forest Hills, Queens, New York City; United States
- Venue: Longwood Cricket Club; West Side Tennis Club

Champions

Men's singles
- (United States) Pancho Gonzales

Women's singles
- (United States) Margaret Osborne duPont

Men's doubles
- (Australia) John Bromwich / (Australia) Bill Sidwell

Women's doubles
- (United States) Louise Brough / (United States) Margaret Osborne duPont

Mixed doubles
- (United States) Louise Brough / (South Africa) Eric Sturgess
← 1948 ·	U.S. National Championships	· 1950 →

The 1949 U.S. National Championships (now known as the US Open) was a tennis tournament that took place on the outdoor grass courts at the West Side Tennis Club, Forest Hills in New York City, New York. The tournament ran from August 26 until September 5. It was the 69th staging of the U.S. National Championships, and the fourth Grand Slam tennis event of the year.

Pancho Gonzales won his second and final Grand Slam title before turning professional.

== Finals ==
=== Men's singles ===
(United States) Pancho Gonzales defeated (United States) Ted Schroeder 16–18, 2–6, 6–1, 6–2, 6–4

=== Women's singles ===
(United States) Margaret Osborne duPont defeated (United States) Doris Hart 6–4, 6–1

=== Men's doubles ===
(Australia) John Bromwich / (Australia) Bill Sidwell defeated (Australia) Frank Sedgman / (Australia) George Worthington 6–4, 6–0, 6–1

=== Women's doubles ===
(United States) Louise Brough / (United States) Margaret Osborne duPont defeated (United States) Shirley Fry / (United States) Doris Hart 6–4, 10–8

=== Mixed doubles ===
(United States) Louise Brough / (South Africa) Eric Sturgess defeated (United States) Margaret Osborne duPont / (United States) Bill Talbert 4–6, 6–3, 7–5

Preceded by 1949 Wimbledon Championships	Grand Slams	Succeeded by 1950 Australian Championships
