= 1951 French Championships – Women's singles =

Women's singles
- 1951 French Championships

Final
- Champion: (United States) Shirley Fry
- Runner-up: (United States) Doris Hart
- Score: 6–3, 3–6, 6–3

Details
- Draw: 46
- Seeds: 8

Events
Singles	men	women
Doubles	men	women
← 1950 ·	French Championships	· 1952 →

Third-seeded Shirley Fry defeated Doris Hart 6–3, 3–6, 6–3 in the final to win the women's singles tennis title at the 1951 French Championships.

== Seeds ==
The seeded players are listed below. Shirley Fry is the champion; others show the round in which they were eliminated.

1. (United States) Doris Hart (finalist)
2. (United States) Margaret Osborne duPont (semifinals)
3. (United States) Shirley Fry (champion)
4. (United Kingdom) Jean Walker-Smith (semifinals)
5. (United States) Beverley Baker (quarterfinals)
6. (Australia) Thelma Coyne Long (quarterfinals)
7. (France) Nelly Adamson (quarterfinals)
8. (United Kingdom) Joy Gannon Mottram (third round)

== Main draw ==
=== Key ===
- Q = Qualifier
- WC = Wild card
- LL = Lucky loser
- Alt = Alternate
- SE = Special exempt
- PR = Protected ranking
- ITF = ITF entry
- JE = Junior exempt
- w/o = Walkover
- r = Retired
- d = Defaulted
- SR = Special ranking

=== Finals ===
Quarterfinals
2	(United States) Margaret Osborne duPont	8	1	6
7	(France) Nelly Adamson	6	6	1
3	(United States) Shirley Fry	12	6
6	(Australia) Thelma Coyne Long	10	1
5	(United States) Beverley Baker	6	4	1
4	(United Kingdom) Jean Walker-Smith	3	6	6
(France) Arlette De Cazalet	0	4
1	(United States) Doris Hart	6	6

Semifinals
2	(United States) Margaret Osborne duPont	2	7
3	(United States) Shirley Fry	6	9
4	(United Kingdom) Jean Walker-Smith	2	1
1	(United States) Doris Hart	6	6

Final
3	(United States) Shirley Fry	6	3	6
1	(United States) Doris Hart	3	6	3

=== Top half ===
==== Section 1 ====
First round
2	(United States) M Osborne duPont
bye
(France) A Varin
bye
(United Kingdom) K Tuckey
bye
(Netherlands) L Schmier
bye
7	(France) N Adamson
bye
(France) G Taillandier
bye
(Italy) N Migliori	6	6
(France) J Kermina	3	5
(France) J Amouretti	6	7	8
(South Africa) B Bartlett	3	9	6

Second round
2	(United States) M Osborne duPont	6	6
(France) A Varin	1	1
(United Kingdom) K Tuckey	6	6
(Netherlands) L Schmier	0	0
7	(France) N Adamson	6	6
(France) G Taillandier	0	2
(Italy) N Migliori	8	6	6
(France) J Amouretti	10	3	1

Third round
2	(United States) M Osborne duPont	6	6
(United Kingdom) K Tuckey	4	4
7	(France) N Adamson	6	6
(Italy) N Migliori	1	2

Quarterfinals
2	(United States) M Osborne duPont	8	1	6
7	(France) N Adamson	6	6	1

==== Section 2 ====
First round
3	(United States) S Fry	6	6
(France) J Patorni	2	2
(United Kingdom) J Quertier
bye
(France) R Veber Jones
bye
(France) J Foy	6	4	6
(France) S Schmitt	3	6	2
6	(Australia) T Coyne Long	6	6
(France) F Cor	0	0
(Switzerland) V Rigollet	7	3	6
(France) Mm Bernard	5	6	2
(Italy) H Matous	7	7	8
(France) M Galtier	5	9	6
(United Kingdom) G Woodgate	6	6
(France) S Pannetier	1	4

Second round
3	(United States) S Fry	6	3	6
(United Kingdom) J Quertier	1	6	3
(France) R Veber Jones	6	6
(France) J Foy	4	2
6	(Australia) T Coyne Long	4	6	8
(Switzerland) V Rigollet	6	2	6
(Italy) H Matous	1	4
(United Kingdom) G Woodgate	6	6

Third round
3	(United States) S Fry	8	6
(France) R Veber Jones	6	1
6	(Australia) T Coyne Long	6	6
(United Kingdom) G Woodgate	3	4

Quarterfinals
3	(United States) S Fry	12	6
6	(Australia) T Coyne Long	10	1

=== Bottom half ===
==== Section 3 ====
First round
(United Kingdom) B Walter
bye
(Belgium) C Mercelis	6	6
(France) N Guinand	0	4
(France) M Dubois	6	6
(France) Van Coller	3	2
(Italy) M Bologna	2	5
5	(United States) B Baker	6	7
(France) J Marcellin	0	6	6
(Netherlands) E Scholten-Klein	6	4	2
(United Kingdom) E Andrews	6	6
(France) S Savoye	4	4
(France) M Bourbonnais	6	6
(France) J Boutin	2	2
bye
4	(United Kingdom) J Walker-Smith

Second round
(United Kingdom) B Walter	6	6
(Belgium) C Mercelis	4	2
(France) M Dubois	3	2
5	(United States) B Baker	6	6
(France) J Marcellin	4	7	6
(United Kingdom) E Andrews	6	5	3
(France) M Bourbonnais	6	1
4	(United Kingdom) J Walker-Smith	8	6

Third round
(United Kingdom) B Walter	4	4
5	(United States) B Baker	6	6
(France) J Marcellin	1	1
4	(United Kingdom) J Walker-Smith	6	6

Quarterfinals
5	(United States) B Baker	6	4	1
4	(United Kingdom) J Walker-Smith	3	6	6

==== Section 4 ====
First round
bye
(France) A De Cazalet
(United States) G. Butler
(United Kingdom) J Curry	w/o
(United States) B. Scofield
bye
(France) F Lemal	0	2
8	(United Kingdom) J Gannon Mottram	6	6
(Switzerland) A Charbonnier
bye
unknown 1
unknown 2
bye
(Italy) V Tonolli
bye
1	(United States) D Hart

Second round
(France) A De Cazalet	4	6	6
(United Kingdom) J Curry	6	1	2
(United States) B. Scofield	3	3
8	(United Kingdom) J Gannon Mottram	6	6
(Switzerland) A Charbonnier	w/o
unknown
(Italy) V Tonolli	0	1
1	(United States) D Hart	6	6

Third round
(France) A De Cazalet	9	6	6
8	(United Kingdom) J Gannon Mottram	7	8	3
(Switzerland) A Charbonnier	3	1
1	(United States) D Hart	6	6

Quarterfinals
(France) A De Cazalet	0	4
1	(United States) D Hart	6	6

Preceded by 1951 Australian Championships – Women's singles	Grand Slam women's singles	Succeeded by 1951 Wimbledon Championships – Women's singles
