= 1950 Wightman Cup =

International women's tennis competition

Details
- Edition: 22nd

Champion
- Winning nation: United States

The 1950 Wightman Cup was the 22nd edition of the annual women's team tennis competition between the United States and Great Britain. It was held at the All England Lawn Tennis and Croquet Club in London in England in the United Kingdom.

Great Britain
0
All England Lawn Tennis and Croquet Club, London, England, United Kingdom
1950
Grass

United States
7

			1	2	3
1	(United Kingdom) (United States)	Betty Hilton; Margaret Osborne duPont	3; 6	4; 6
2	(United Kingdom) (United States)	Joan Curry; Doris Hart	2; 6	4; 6
3	(United Kingdom) (United States)	Betty Hilton; Louise Brough	6; 2	2; 6	5; 7
4	(United Kingdom) (United States)	Jean Walker-Smith; Margaret Osborne duPont	3; 6	2; 6
5	(United Kingdom) (United States)	Jean Walker-Smith; Louise Brough	0; 6	0; 6
6	(United Kingdom) (United States)	Jean Walker-Smith / Jean Quertier; Doris Hart / Patricia Todd	2; 6	3; 6
7	(United Kingdom) (United States)	Betty Hilton / Kay Tuckey; Louise Brough / Margaret Osborne duPont	2; 6	0; 6
