= Beverly Baker Fleitz =

American tennis player (1930–2014)

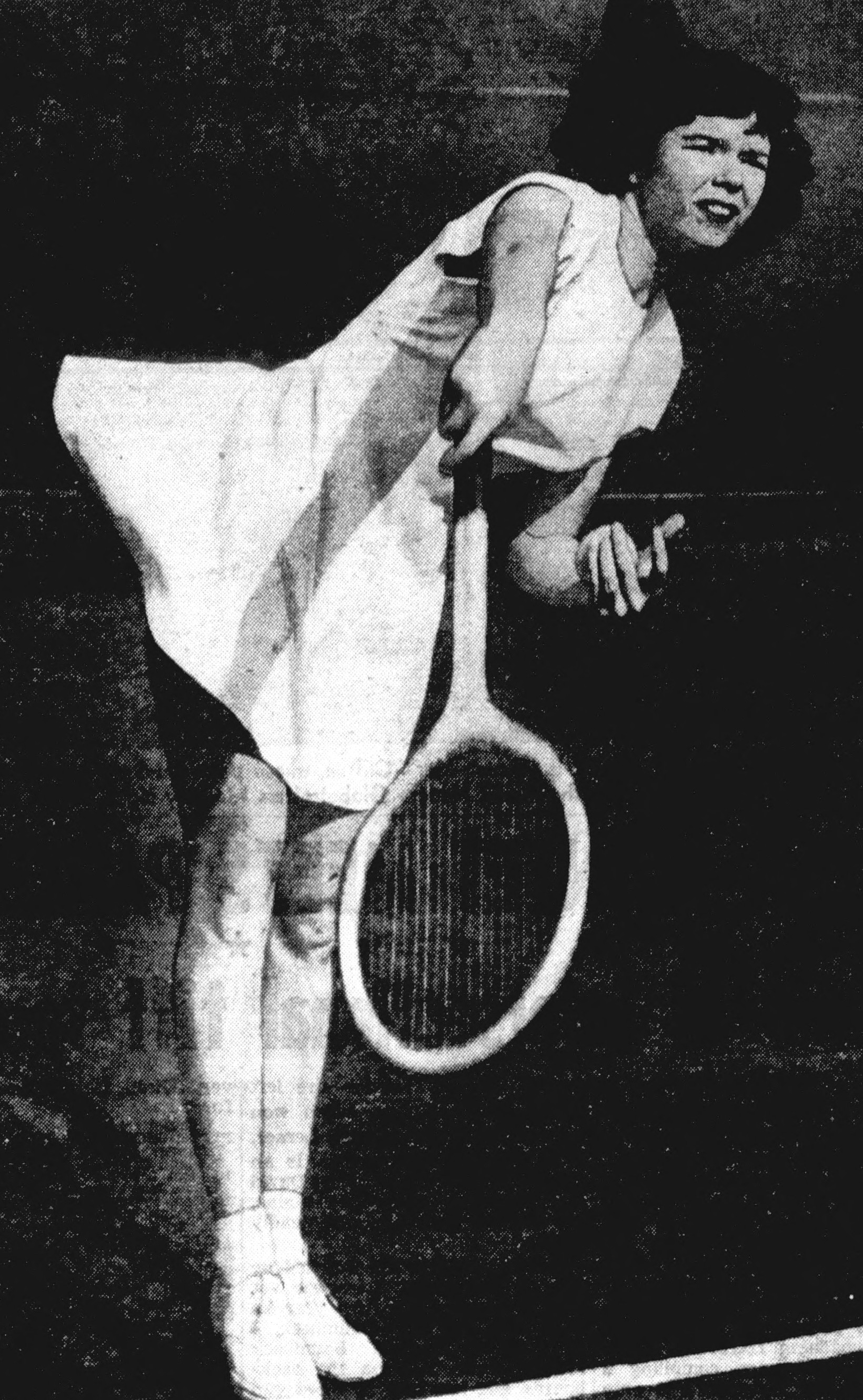
- Baker Fleitz, circa 1949
- Full name: Beverly Joyce Baker Fleitz
- Country (sports): United States
- Born: March 13, 1930 Providence, Rhode Island, U.S.
- Died: April 29, 2014 (aged 84) Long Beach, California, U.S.
- Plays: Ambidextrous (forehand both sides)
- Prize money: Amateur

Singles
- Highest ranking: World No. 3 (1954, 1955, 1958)

Grand Slam singles results
- French Open: SF (1955)
- Wimbledon: F (1955)
- US Open: SF (1950, 1958)

Grand Slam doubles results
- French Open: W (1955)
- Wimbledon: F (1959)
- US Open: QF (1949, 1950)

Grand Slam mixed doubles results
- French Open: QF (1951)
- Wimbledon: 4R (1959)
- US Open: QF (1948, 1951, 1958)

Beverly Joyce Fleitz (née Baker; March 13, 1930 – April 29, 2014) was an American tennis player from the United States who was active in the late 1940s and during the 1950s. According to John Olliff and Lance Tingay of The Daily Telegraph and the Daily Mail, Fleitz was ranked in the world top 10 in 1951, 1954, 1955, 1958, and 1959, reaching a career high of World No. 3 in these rankings in 1954, 1955, and 1958. Fleitz was included in the year-end top 10 rankings issued by the United States Lawn Tennis Association from 1948 through 1951 and in 1954, 1955, 1958, and 1959. She was the top-ranked U.S. player in 1959. She was ambidextrous and played with two forehands.

== Career ==
Fleitz began playing tennis at age 11 and played mostly on public courts in Lincoln Park in Santa Monica, California. Her father, Frank Baker, was her only coach and was the assistant director of recreation for the city of Santa Monica.

During 11 of the 12 weeks following June 19, 1950, Fleitz competed in tournaments across the U.S. In singles, she won three titles, was the runner-up three times, and was a semifinalist at both the U.S. National Championships and the U.S. Women's Clay Court Championships. Her six losses during this period were to Doris Hart (twice), Margaret Osborne duPont (twice), Maureen Connolly, and Magda Berescu Rurac. She recorded wins over Louise Brough, Connolly, Berescu Rurac, Patricia Canning Todd, and Dorothy Bundy Cheney. In women's doubles, she was a quarterfinalist at the U.S. National Doubles Championships.

=== Grand Slam tournaments ===
At the U.S. National Championships, Fleitz reached the semifinals twice and the quarterfinals in four of her six other attempts. She played Grand Slam singles tournaments outside the U.S. only six times. At the 1951 Wimbledon Championships, she defeated Althea Gibson in the third round and Margaret Osborne duPont in the quarterfinals, then lost to Doris Hart in the semifinals. Fleitz was the top seed at the 1955 French International Championships, but she was upset by fourth-seeded Dorothy Head Knode in the semifinals.

At the 1955 Wimbledon Championships, third-seeded Fleitz defeated top-seeded Hart in the semifinals in two sets, which was the last Wimbledon singles match of Hart's career. Fleitz then played second-seeded Louise Brough in the final. Fleitz was the first mother to play in a Wimbledon singles final since Dorothea Douglass Lambert Chambers in 1920. Fleitz had won the last four matches with Brough since the beginning of 1954, but Brough prevailed on this day in straight sets in 1 hour, 32 minutes. The veteran BBC tennis broadcaster Max Robertson observed "Louise was always prone to tighten up at important points, but [she] had a greater breadth of stroke and experience at her command, which just saw her through a keenly fought struggle. In the sixth game of the second set, for example, it was only after nine deuces and five [game points for]...Fleitz that [on the game's 24th point] Louise wrong-footed her...[nearly] exhausted opponent with a backhand slice down the line to lead 4-2. That was the turning point, and Louise went on to win her fourth [Wimbledon] singles [title]."

Afterward, Fleitz said "I've no excuses for my defeat. Louise was just marvelous today. She played as well as I've ever seen her play and well deserved her victory."

At the 1956 Wimbledon Championships, Fleitz reached the quarterfinals, then she was forced to withdraw from the tournament because of a pregnancy-related illness. She last played Wimbledon in 1959 as the third-seeded player. Unseeded Edda Buding from West Germany defeated her in the fourth round in three sets.

Fleitz never played contemporaries Angela Mortimer, Ann Haydon, Christine Truman, Darlene Hard, Maureen Connolly, or Shirley Fry in a Grand Slam singles tournament. Her win–loss record against other top players at these tournaments was: Althea Gibson 2–1, Doris Hart 1–2, Louise Brough 0–3, Margaret Osborne duPont 2–1, and Maria Bueno 1–0.

Her only Grand Slam title was in women's doubles at the 1955 French International Championships. In the final, she and partner Darlene Hard needed 50 games to defeat their opponents in the longest Grand Slam women's doubles final of all time.

=== Other tournaments ===
Outside of the U.S., Fleitz won singles tournaments in Bermuda, England, Ireland, Mexico, and West Germany. She was the runner-up at tournaments in Cuba and England.

In the U.S., she was the runner-up at the 1949 U.S. Clay Court Championships, losing to former Romanian national champion Magda Berescu Rurac. Fleitz won the U.S. Hardcourt Championships three times, in 1954, 1957, and 1958. She defeated future Wimbledon singles champion Karen Hantze in the 1958 final. In tournaments sponsored by sections (regions) of the United States Lawn Tennis Association, Fleitz was the singles champion of the Southern California section four times (1954, 1955, 1956, and 1958), the Pacific Northwest section once, and the Western section once.

In March 1954, Fleitz defeated Maureen Connolly 6–0, 6–4 at a tournament in La Jolla, California, which was the last time anyone defeated Connolly in a singles tournament and her only loss of 1954. Connolly had won the last seven Grand Slam singles tournaments she had played. Fleitz won eight of their thirteen career singles matches.

Fleitz was a four-time singles champion at the Pacific Southwest Championships in Los Angeles (1947, 1955, 1958, and 1959) and was the runner-up three times. She defeated Hard in the 1958 final and Bueno in the 1959 final. At the Tri-State Championships in Cincinnati, Fleitz won the 1950 singles title and was the runner-up in 1949, with Berescu Rurac's being her opponent in both finals.

=== Retirement years ===
Fleitz retired permanently from singles tennis in 1959 and was inducted into the Southern California Tennis Association Hall of Fame in 2005.

== Personal life ==
She married actor Scotty Beckett on September 28, 1949 in Las Vegas, Nevada. Baker was granted a divorce in June 1950.

She married tennis player John Fleitz on October 6, 1951. They had five daughters. John Fleitz died in Long Beach, California on November 14, 2011 at age 82.

She can be heard as a contestant on the 7th November 1951 edition of You Bet Your Life.

== Grand Slam finals ==
=== Singles: (1 runner-up) ===
Result	Year	Championship	Surface	Opponent	Score
Loss	1955	Wimbledon Championships	Grass	(United States) Louise Brough	5–7, 6–8

=== Doubles: (1 title, 1 runner-up) ===
Result	Year	Championship	Surface	Partner	Opponents	Score
Win	1955	French Championships	Clay	(United States) Darlene Hard	(United Kingdom) Shirley Bloomer (United Kingdom) Patricia Ward	7–5, 6–8, 13–11
Loss	1959	Wimbledon Championships	Grass	(United Kingdom) Christine Truman	(United States) Jeanne Arth (United States) Darlene Hard	6–2, 2–6, 3–6

== Other singles finals (38 titles, 13 runner-ups) ==
Result	Date	Tournament	Surface	Opponent	Score
Lost	Apr 1948	Ojai Tennis Tournament; Ojai, California, U.S.	Hard	Louise Brough	2–6, 2–6
Won	Jul 1948	Colorado State Championships; Denver, Colorado, U.S.	Hard	Maureen Connolly	6–0, 6–3
Won	Jul 1948	Pacific Northwest Sectional Championships; Tacoma, Washington, U.S.	Unknown	Maureen Connolly	6–2, 6–1
Lost	Sep 1948	Pacific Southwest Championships; Los Angeles Tennis Club, Los Angeles, U.S.	Hard	Louise Brough	2–6, 3–6
Lost	Apr 1949	Ojai Valley Tennis Tournament; Ojai, California, U.S.	Hard	Louise Brough	1–6, 4–6
Lost	Jun 1950	Hotel del Coronado Invitational; Coronado, California, U.S.	Hard	Maureen Connolly	2–6, 9–7, 2–6
Lost	Jun 1950	Southern Sectional Championships; Louisville, Kentucky, U.S.	Clay	Magda Berescu Rurac	6–8, 2–6
Won	Jul 1950	Tri-State Tennis Championships; Cincinnati Tennis Club; Cincinnati, Ohio, U.S.	Clay	Magda Berescu Rurac	5–7, 6–3, 9–7
Won	Jul 1950	Western Sectional Championships; Indianapolis, Indiana, U.S.	Clay	Melita Ramírez	6–1, 6–2
Won	Jul 1950	Maidstone Club Invitational; East Hampton, New York, U.S.	Grass	Maureen Connolly	6–4, 9–7
Lost	Aug 1950	Essex County Club Championships; Manchester-by-the-Sea, Massachusetts, U.S.	Grass	Margaret Osborne duPont	3–6, 0–6
Won	Jan 1951	Dixie Championships; Tampa, Florida, U.S.	Clay	Shirley Fry	6–3, 6–4
Won	Jan 1951	South Florida Championships; Howard Park; West Palm Beach, Florida, U.S.	Clay	Shirley Fry	6–4, 6–4
Lost	Jan 1951	Havana (Cuba) International	Unknown	Doris Hart	4–6, 6–8
Lost	Feb 1951	U.S. Indoor National Championships; Seventh Regiment Armory; New York City	Wood	Nancy Chaffee	4–6, 4–6
Won	Feb 1951	Bermuda International; Hamilton	Unknown	Barbara Scofield	9–7, 7–5
Won	Mar 1951	Coral Beach Club Invitational; Hamilton, Bermuda	Unknown	Betty Rosenquest	4–6, 6–4, 6–2
Won	May 1951	Hurlingham (England) Hard Courts	Clay	Kay Tuckey	6–4, 5–7, 7–5
Won	May 1951	Priory Club Tournament; Birmingham, England	Grass	Nancye Wynne Bolton	4–6, 6–4, 6–2
Lost	Jun 1951	Northern Championships; Northern Lawn Tennis Club; Manchester, England	Grass	Doris Hart	6–8, 3–6
Won	Jun 1951	West of England Championships; Bristol	Grass	Beryl Nicholas-Bartlett	6–3, 6–3
Lost	Jul 1951	Maidstone Club Invitational; East Hampton, New York, U.S.	Grass	Patricia Canning Todd	4–6, 1–6
Lost	Sep 1951	Pacific Southwest Championships; Los Angeles Tennis Club; Los Angeles, U.S.	Hard	Maureen Connolly	7–9, 4–6
Won	Jun 1953	Hotel del Coronado Invitational; Coronado, California, U.S.	Hard	Dorothy Bundy Cheney	4–6, 8–6, 6–1
Won	Aug 1953	Balboa Bay Club Invitational, Newport Beach, California, U.S.	Hard	Dorothy Bundy Cheney	6–4, 7–5
Won	Sep 1953	Santa Monica City Tournament; Santa Monica, California, U.S.	Hard	Dorothy Bundy Cheney	6–4, 6–4
Won	May 1954	Southern California Sectional Championships; Los Angeles, U.S.	Hard	Louise Brough	5–7, 6–4, 7–5
Won	Jul 1954	Pennsylvania Lawn Tennis Championships; Merion Cricket Club; Haverford, Pennsylvania, U.S.	Grass	Louise Brough	6–4, 2–6, 8–6
Won	Dec 1954	U.S. Women's Hardcourt Championships; La Jolla Beach and Tennis Club; La Jolla, California, U.S.	Hard	Barbara Green	6–1, 6–3
Won	Jan 1955	Thunderbird Invitational; Phoenix, Arizona, U.S.	Hard	Patricia Canning Todd	6–1, 6–1
Won	Feb 1955	Shadow Mountain Club Invitational; Palm Desert, California, U.S.	Hard	Barbara Breit	6–2, 6–3
Won	Mar 1955	La Jolla Beach and Tennis Club Invitational; La Jolla, California, U.S.	Hard	Louise Brough	8–6, 3–6, 6–2
Won	May 1955	Southern California Sectional Championships; Los Angeles, U.S.	Hard	Louise Brough	7–5, 6–4
Won	May 1955	Wiesbaden (Germany) International	Clay	Elaine Watson	6–3, 6–2
Won	Jul 1955	Irish Lawn Tennis Championships; Fitzwilliam Lawn Tennis Club; Dublin	Grass	Darlene Hard	6–2, 6–2
Won	Sep 1955	Pacific Southwest Championships; Los Angeles Tennis Club, Los Angeles, U.S.	Hard	Barbara Breit	6–1, 6–4
Won	Feb 1956	Shadow Mountain Club Invitational; Palm Desert, California, U.S.	Hard	Darlene Hard	6–4, 6–1
Won	Apr 1956	Ojai Valley Tennis Tournament; Ojai, California, U.S.	Hard	Dorothy Bundy Cheney	7–5, 6–2
Won	May 1956	Southern California Sectional Championships; Los Angeles, U.S.	Hard	Louise Brough	6–3, 6–4
Lost	Aug 1957	Santa Monica City Tournament; Santa Monica, California, U.S.	Hard	Dorothy Bundy Cheney	3–6, 6–0, 4–6
Won	Oct 1957	Balboa Bay Club Invitational; Newport Beach, California, U.S.	Hard	Dorothy Bundy Cheney	6–4, 6–1
Won	Dec 1957	U.S. Women's Hardcourt Championships; La Jolla Beach and Tennis Club; La Jolla, California, U.S.	Hard	Mary "Mimi" Arnold	6–1, 6–1
Won	Jan 1958	Thunderbird Invitational; Phoenix, Arizona, U.S.	Hard	Louise Brough	6–2, 3–6, 10–8
Won	Mar 1958	Puerto Rican Invitational; San Juan, Puerto Rico	Hard	Althea Gibson	6–4, 10–8
Won	Sep 1958	Pacific Southwest Championships; Los Angeles Tennis Club, Los Angeles, U.S.	Hard	Darlene Hard	6–3, 9–7
Won	Dec 1958	U.S. Women's Hardcourt Championships; La Jolla Beach and Tennis Club; La Jolla, California, U.S.	Hard	Karen Hantze	6–1, 8–6
Won	Feb 1959	Shadow Mountain Club Invitational; Palm Desert, California, U.S.	Hard	Sally Moore	6–2, 6–2
Lost	Jul 1959	U.S. Women's Hardcourt Championships; Denver, Colorado, U.S.	Hard	Sandra Reynolds	3–6, 2–6
Won	Aug 1959	Santa Monica City Tournament; Lincoln Park; Santa Monica, California, U.S.	Hard	Diane Wootton	6–3, 6–2
Won	Sep 1959	Pacific Southwest Championships; Los Angeles Tennis Club, Los Angeles, U.S.	Hard	Maria Bueno	4–6, 6–4, 6–3
Won	Oct 1959	Pan American International Championships; Mexico City, Mexico	Clay	Patricia Canning Todd	6–1, 7–5

== Grand Slam tournament timeline ==
Key
W	F	SF	QF	#R	RR	Q#	DNQ	A	NH

(W) winner; (F) finalist; (SF) semifinalist; (QF) quarterfinalist; (#R) rounds 4, 3, 2, 1; (RR) round-robin stage; (Q#) qualification round; (DNQ) did not qualify; (A) absent; (NH) not held; (SR) strike rate (events won / competed); (W–L) win–loss record.

=== Singles ===
Tournament	1947^{1}	1948	1949	1950	1951	1952	1953	1954	1955	1956	1957	1958	1959	Career SR	Win–loss
Australian Championships	A	A	A	A	A	A	A	A	A	A	A	A	A	0 / 0	0–0
French Championships	A	A	A	A	QF	A	A	A	SF	A	A	A	A	0 / 2	6–2
Wimbledon Championships	A	A	A	A	SF	A	A	A	F	QF	A	A	4R	0 / 4	16–3
U.S. National Championships	3R	QF	QF	SF	3R	A	A	QF	QF	A	A	SF	A	0 / 8	22–7
SR	0 / 1	0 / 1	0 / 1	0 / 1	0 / 3	0 / 0	0 / 0	0 / 1	0 / 3	0 / 1	0 / 0	0 / 1	0 / 1	0 / 14	
Win–loss	2–1	3–1	3–1	3–1	8–3	0–0	0–0	3–0	12–3	3–0	0–0	4–1	3–1		44–12

^{1}In 1947, the French International Championships were held after the Wimbledon Championships.

=== Doubles ===
Tournament	1949	1950	1951	1952	1953	1954	1955	1956	1957	1958	1959	Career SR	Win–loss
Australian Championships	A	A	A	A	A	A	A	A	A	A	A	0 / 0	0–0
French Championships	A	A	1R	A	A	A	W	A	A	A	A	0 / 2	4–1
Wimbledon Championships	A	A	SF	A	A	A	SF	2R	A	A	F	0 / 4	13–3
U.S. National Championships	QF	QF	2R	A	A	A	A	A	A	A	A	0 / 3	3–3
SR	0 / 1	0 / 1	0 / 3	0 / 0	0 / 0	0 / 0	0 / 2	0 / 1	0 / 0	0 / 0	0 / 1	0 / 9	
Win–loss	2–1	1–1	4–3	0–0	0–0	0–0	7–1	1–0	0–0	0–0	5–1		20–7

== See also ==
- Performance timelines for all female tennis players since 1978 who reached at least one Grand Slam final
