= 1953 Wightman Cup =

Women's team tennis competition, US vs GB

Details
- Edition: 25th

Champion
- Winning nation: United States

The 1953 Wightman Cup was the 25th edition of the annual women's team tennis competition between the United States and Great Britain. It was held from August 1 through August 3, 1953, at the Westchester Country Club in Rye, New York, in the United States and played on outdoor grass courts. Colonel Duncan Macaulay was captain of the British team while Margaret Osborne duPont captained the U.S. team. The U.S. team won the competition 7–0.

United States
7
Westchester Country Club, Rye, New York, United States
1–3 August 1953
Grass

Great Britain
0

			1	2	3
1	(United States) (United Kingdom)	Maureen Connolly; Angela Mortimer	6; 1	6; 1
2	(United States) (United Kingdom)	Doris Hart; Helen Fletcher	6; 4	7; 5
3	(United States) (United Kingdom)	Shirley Fry; Jean Quertier Rinkel	6; 2	6; 4
4	(United States) (United Kingdom)	Maureen Connolly; Helen Fletcher	6; 1	6; 1
5	(United States) (United Kingdom)	Doris Hart; Angela Mortimer	6; 1	6; 1
6	(United States) (United Kingdom)	Maureen Connolly / Louise Brough; Angela Mortimer / Anne Shilcock	6; 2	6; 3
7	(United States) (United Kingdom)	Doris Hart / Shirley Fry; Jean Quertier Rinkel / Helen Fletcher	6; 2	6; 1

== Sources ==
- The Bud Collins History of Tennis: An Authoritative Encyclopedia and Record Book (pp. 528, 530), Bud Collins, New Chapter Press, 2010, ISBN 978-0-942257-70-0.
