= 1950 French Championships (tennis) =

- Date: 24 May – 4 June 1950
- Edition: 49
- Category: 20th Grand Slam (ITF)
- Surface: Clay
- Location: Paris (XVI^{e}), France
- Venue: Stade Roland Garros

Champions

Men's singles
- (United States) Budge Patty

Women's singles
- (United States) Doris Hart

Men's doubles
- (United States) Bill Talbert / (United States) Tony Trabert

Women's doubles
- (United States) Doris Hart / (United States) Shirley Fry

Mixed doubles
- (United States) Barbara Scofield / (Argentina) Enrique Morea
← 1949 ·	French Championships	· 1951 →

The 1950 French Championships (now known as the French Open) was a tennis tournament that took place on the outdoor clay courts at the Stade Roland-Garros in Paris, France. The tournament ran from 24 May until 4 June. It was the 54th staging of the French Championships, and the second Grand Slam tennis event of 1950. Budge Patty and Doris Hart won the singles titles.

== Finals ==
=== Men's singles ===
(United States) Budge Patty defeated (Egypt) Jaroslav Drobný 6–1, 6–2, 3–6, 5–7, 7–5

=== Women's singles ===
(United States) Doris Hart defeated (United States) Patricia Canning Todd 6–4, 4–6, 6–2

=== Men's doubles ===
(United States) Bill Talbert / (United States) Tony Trabert defeated (Egypt) Jaroslav Drobný / (South Africa) Eric Sturgess 6–2, 1–6, 10–8, 6–2

=== Women's doubles ===
(United States) Doris Hart / (United States) Shirley Fry defeated (United States) Louise Brough / (United States) Margaret Osborne duPont 1–6, 7–5, 6–2

=== Mixed doubles ===
(United States) Barbara Scofield / (Argentina) Enrique Morea defeated (United States) Patricia Canning Todd / (United States) Bill Talbert walkover

Preceded by 1950 Australian Championships	Grand Slams	Succeeded by 1950 Wimbledon Championships
