= 1950 Australian Championships =

- Date: 20-31 January 1950
- Edition: 38th
- Category: Grand Slam (ITF)
- Surface: Grass
- Location: Melbourne, Australia
- Venue: Kooyong Stadium

Champions

Men's singles
- (Australia) Frank Sedgman

Women's singles
- (United States) Louise Brough Clapp

Men's doubles
- (Australia) John Bromwich / (Australia) Adrian Quist

Women's doubles
- (United States) Louise Brough / (United States) Doris Hart

Mixed doubles
- (United States) Doris Hart / (Australia) Frank Sedgman
- Australian Championships

The 1950 Australian Championships was a tennis tournament that took place on outdoor Grass courts at the Kooyong Stadium in Melbourne, Australia from 21 January to 30 January. It was the 38th edition of the Australian Championships (now known as the Australian Open), the 11th held in Melbourne, and the first Grand Slam tournament of the year. Australian Frank Sedgman and American Louise Brough Clapp won the singles titles.

== Finals ==
=== Men's singles ===
(Australia) Frank Sedgman defeated (Australia) Ken McGregor 6–3, 6–4, 4–6, 6–1

=== Women's singles ===
(United States) Louise Brough defeated (United States) Doris Hart 6–4, 3–6, 6–4

=== Men's doubles ===
(Australia) John Bromwich / (Australia) Adrian Quist defeated (Egypt) Jaroslav Drobný / (South Africa) Eric Sturgess 6–3, 5–7, 4–6, 6–3, 8–6

=== Women's doubles ===
(United States) Louise Brough / (United States) Doris Hart defeated (Australia) Nancye Wynne Bolton / (Australia) Thelma Coyne Long 6–2, 2–6, 6–3

=== Mixed doubles ===
(United States) Doris Hart / (Australia) Frank Sedgman defeated (Australia) Joyce Fitch / (South Africa) Eric Sturgess 8–6, 6–4

Preceded by 1949 U.S. National Championships	Grand Slams	Succeeded by 1950 French Championships
