= 1953 U.S. National Championships (tennis) =

- Date: 29 August – 7 September
- Edition: 73rd
- Category: Grand Slam (ILTF)
- Surface: Grass
- Location: Chestnut Hill, Massachusetts; Forest Hills, Queens, New York City; United States
- Venue: Longwood Cricket Club; West Side Tennis Club

Champions

Men's singles
- (United States) Tony Trabert

Women's singles
- (United States) Maureen Connolly

Men's doubles
- (Australia) Rex Hartwig / (Australia) Mervyn Rose

Women's doubles
- (United States) Shirley Fry / (United States) Doris Hart

Mixed doubles
- (United States) Doris Hart / (United States) Vic Seixas
- U.S. National Championships

The 1953 U.S. National Championships (now known as the US Open) was a tennis tournament that took place on the outdoor grass courts at the West Side Tennis Club, Forest Hills in New York City, New York. The tournament ran from 29 August until 7 September. It was the 73rd staging of the U.S. National Championships, and the fourth Grand Slam tennis event of the year.

== Finals ==
=== Men's singles ===
(United States) Tony Trabert defeated (United States) Vic Seixas 6–3, 6–2, 6–3

=== Women's singles ===
(United States) Maureen Connolly defeated (United States) Doris Hart 6–2, 6–4

=== Men's doubles ===
(Australia) Rex Hartwig / (Australia) Mervyn Rose defeated (United States) Gardnar Mulloy / (United States) Bill Talbert 6–4, 4–6, 6–2, 6–4

=== Women's doubles ===
(United States) Shirley Fry / (United States) Doris Hart defeated (United States) Louise Brough / (United States) Margaret Osborne duPont 6–2, 7–9, 9–7

=== Mixed doubles ===
(United States) Doris Hart / (United States) Vic Seixas defeated (United States) Julia Sampson / (Australia) Rex Hartwig 6–2, 4–6, 6–4

Preceded by 1953 Wimbledon Championships	Grand Slams	Succeeded by 1954 Australian Championships
