= 1948 U.S. National Championships (tennis) =

- Date: September 10–19
- Edition: 68th
- Category: Grand Slam (ILTF)
- Surface: Grass
- Location: Forest Hills, New York City; Chestnut Hill, Massachusetts; United States
- Venue: West Side Tennis Club; Longwood Cricket Club

Champions

Men's singles
- (United States) Pancho Gonzales

Women's singles
- (United States) Margaret Osborne duPont

Men's doubles
- (United States) Gardnar Mulloy / (United States) Bill Talbert

Women's doubles
- (United States) Louise Brough / (United States) Margaret Osborne

Mixed doubles
- (United States) Louise Brough / (United States) Tom Brown
- U.S. National Championships

The 1948 U.S. National Championships (now known as the US Open) was a tennis tournament that took place on the outdoor grass courts in the United States. The men's and women's singles events as well as the mixed doubles were held at the West Side Tennis Club, Forest Hills in New York City, while the men's and women's doubles events were played at the Longwood Cricket Club in Chestnut Hill, Massachusetts. The tournament ran from September 10 until September 19. It was the 68th staging of the U.S. National Championships, and the fourth Grand Slam tennis event of the year. Pancho Gonzales and Margaret Osborne duPont won the singles titles.

== Finals ==
=== Men's singles ===
(United States) Pancho Gonzales defeated (South Africa) Eric Sturgess 6–2, 6–3, 14–12

=== Women's singles ===
(United States) Margaret Osborne duPont defeated (United States) Louise Brough 4–6, 6–4, 15–13

=== Men's doubles ===
(United States) Gardnar Mulloy / (United States) Bill Talbert defeated (United States) Frank Parker / (United States) Ted Schroeder 1–6, 9–7, 6–3, 3–6, 9–7

=== Women's doubles ===
(United States) Louise Brough / (United States) Margaret Osborne duPont defeated (United States) Patricia Todd / (United States) Doris Hart 6–4, 8–10, 6–1

=== Mixed doubles ===
(United States) Louise Brough / (United States) Tom Brown defeated (United States) Margaret Osborne duPont / (United States) Bill Talbert 6–4, 6–4

Preceded by 1948 Wimbledon Championships	Grand Slams	Succeeded by 1949 Australian Championships
