= 1949 Australian Championships – Women's singles =

Women's singles
- 1949 Australian Championships

Final
- Champion: (United States) Doris Hart
- Runner-up: (Australia) Nancye Bolton
- Score: 6–3, 6–4

Details
- Draw: 30
- Seeds: 8

Events
| Singles | men | women |
| Doubles | men | women |
- Australian Championships

First-seeded Doris Hart defeated Nancye Bolton 6–3, 6–4 in the final to win the women's singles tennis title at the 1949 Australian Championships.

== Seeds ==
The seeded players are listed below. Doris Hart is the champion; others show the round in which they were eliminated.

1. (United States) Doris Hart (champion)
2. (Australia) Nancye Bolton (finalist)
3. (Australia) Thelma Long (semifinals)
4. (Australia) Joyce Fitch (second round)
5. (Australia) Mary Hawton (quarterfinals)
6. (Australia) Sadie Newcombe (quarterfinals)
7. (Australia) Esme Ashford (second round)
8. (Australia) Dulcie Whittaker (quarterfinals)

== Draw ==
=== Key ===
- Q = Qualifier
- WC = Wild card
- LL = Lucky loser
- r = Retired

=== Finals ===
Quarterfinals
1 | (United States) Doris Hart | 3 | 6 | 6
8 | (Australia) Dulcie Whittaker | 6 | 3 | 2
(Australia) Alison Baker | 6 | 1 | 6
(Australia) Marie Toomey | 3 | 6 | 3
6 | (Australia) Sadie Newcombe | 0 | 3
3 | (Australia) Thelma Long | 6 | 6
5 | (Australia) Mary Hawton | 1 | 1
2 | (Australia) Nancye Bolton | 6 | 6

Semifinals
1 | (United States) Doris Hart | 6 | 6
(Australia) Alison Baker | 3 | 1
3 | (Australia) Thelma Long | 4 | 2
2 | (Australia) Nancye Bolton | 6 | 6

Finals
1 | (United States) Doris Hart | 6 | 6
2 | (Australia) Nancye Bolton | 3 | 4

=== Earlier rounds ===
==== Section 1 ====
First round
(Australia) Moran | 6 | 6
(Australia) Mason | 1 | 1
8 | (Australia) Whittaker | 6 | 6
(Australia) Sheidow | 1 | 2
(Australia) Proctor | 8 | 6
(Australia) Thiele | 6 | 2
4 | (Australia) Fitch | 6 | 6
(Australia) Chamberlin | 3 | 1
(Australia) Baker
(Australia) Williams | w/o
7 | (Australia) Ashford
(Australia) Strickland | w/o
(Australia) Toomey | 6 | 6
(Australia) Nottage | 1 | 0

Second round
1 | (United States) Hart | 6 | 6
(Australia) Moran | 3 | 2
8 | (Australia) Whittaker | 6 | 6
(Australia) Proctor | 4 | 1
4 | (Australia) Fitch | 3 | 4
(Australia) Baker | 6 | 6
7 | (Australia) Ashford | 6 | 2 | 4
(Australia) Toomey | 4 | 6 | 6

Quarterfinals
1 | (United States) Hart | 3 | 6 | 6
8 | (Australia) Whittaker | 6 | 3 | 2
(Australia) Baker | 6 | 1 | 6
(Australia) Toomey | 3 | 6 | 3

Semifinals
1 | (United States) Hart | 6 | 6
(Australia) Baker | 3 | 1

==== Section 2 ====
First round
(Australia) Hopman | 6 | 6
(Australia) Thomas | 1 | 0
6 | (Australia) Newcombe | 6 | 6
(Australia) Taylor | 1 | 1
(Australia) Warnock | 6 | 6
(Australia) Traeger | 4 | 4
3 | (Australia) Long | 6 | 6
(Australia) Redwood | 2 | 2
(Australia) Mance | 6 | 6
(Australia) Richardson | 3 | 3
5 | (Australia) Hawton
(Australia) Parkinson | w/o
(Australia) Jenkins | 6 | 6
(Australia) Bennett | 1 | 0

Second round
(Australia) Hopman | 7 | 3 | 0
6 | (Australia) Newcombe | 5 | 6 | 6
(Australia) Warnock | 2 | 1
3 | (Australia) Long | 6 | 6
(Australia) Mance | 2 | 4
5 | (Australia) Hawton | 6 | 6
(Australia) Jenkins | 1 | 2
2 | (Australia) Bolton | 6 | 6

Quarterfinals
6 | (Australia) Newcombe | 0 | 3
3 | (Australia) Long | 6 | 6
5 | (Australia) Hawton | 1 | 1
2 | (Australia) Bolton | 6 | 6

Semifinals
3 | (Australia) Long | 4 | 2
2 | (Australia) Bolton | 6 | 6

| Preceded by 1948 U.S. National Championships | Grand Slam women's singles | Succeeded by 1949 French Championships |
