= 1951 U.S. National Championships – Women's singles =

Women's singles
- 1951 U.S. National Championships

Final
- Champion: (United States) Maureen Connolly
- Runner-up: (United States) Shirley Fry
- Score: 6–3, 1–6, 6–4

Events
| Singles | men | women |
| Doubles | men | women |
- U.S. National Championships

Fourth-seeded Maureen Connolly defeated Shirley Fry 6–3, 1–6, 6–4 in the final to win the women's singles tennis title at the 1951 U.S. National Championships.

== Seeds ==
The tournament used two lists for seeding the women's singles event; one for U.S. players and one for foreign players. Maureen Connolly is the champion; others show in brackets the round in which they were eliminated.

1. (United States) Doris Hart (semifinals)
2. (United States) Shirley Fry (finalist)
3. (United States) Patricia Canning Todd (third round)
4. (United States) Maureen Connolly (champion)
5. (United States) Nancy Chaffee (quarterfinals)
6. (United States) Beverly Baker (third round)
7. (United States) Betty Rosenquest (second round)
1. (United Kingdom) Jean Walker-Smith (semifinals)
2. (United Kingdom) Jean Quertier (quarterfinals)
3. (United Kingdom) Kay Tuckey (quarterfinals)
4. (United Kingdom) Joy Mottram (third round)
5. (United Kingdom) Patricia Ward (third round)
6. (United Kingdom) Helen Fletcher (first round)

== Draw ==
=== Key ===
- Q = Qualifier
- WC = Wild card
- LL = Lucky loser
- r = Retired

=== Final eight ===
Quarterfinals
2 | (United States) Shirley Fry | 9 | 3 | 6
(3) | (United Kingdom) Kay Tuckey | 7 | 6 | 2
(Romania) Magda Rurac | 2 | 3
(1) | (United Kingdom) Jean Walker-Smith | 6 | 6
4 | (United States) Maureen Connolly | 6 | 6
(2) | (United Kingdom) Jean Quertier | 3 | 3
1 | (United States) Doris Hart | 6 | 6
5 | (United States) Nancy Chaffee | 2 | 4

Semifinals
2 | (United States) Shirley Fry | 2 | 6 | 6
(1) | (United Kingdom) Jean Walker-Smith | 6 | 2 | 1
4 | (United States) Maureen Connolly | 6 | 6
1 | (United States) Doris Hart | 4 | 4

Finals
2 | (United States) Shirley Fry | 3 | 6 | 4
4 | (United States) Maureen Connolly | 6 | 1 | 6

| Preceded by 1951 Wimbledon Championships – Women's singles | Grand Slam women's singles | Succeeded by 1952 Australian Championships – Women's singles |
