= 1950 Australian Championships – Women's singles =

Women's singles
- 1950 Australian Championships

Final
- Champion: (United States) Louise Brough
- Runner-up: (United States) Doris Hart
- Score: 6–4, 3–6, 6–4

Details
- Draw: 32
- Seeds: 8

Events
Singles	men	women
Doubles	men	women
- Australian Championships

First-seeded Louise Brough defeated Doris Hart, 6–4, 3–6, 6–4 in the final to win the women's singles tennis title at the 1950 Australian Championships. The event was played on outdoor grass courts in Melbourne, Australia.

== Seeds ==
The seeded players are listed below. Louise Brough is the champion; others show the round in which they were eliminated.

1. (United States) Louise Brough (champion)
2. (United States) Doris Hart (finalist)
3. (Australia) Nancye Bolton (semifinals)
4. (Australia) Joyce Fitch (semifinals)
5. (Australia) Thelma Long (quarterfinals)
6. (Australia) Mary Hawton (quarterfinals)
7. (Australia) Nell Hopman (quarterfinals)
8. (Australia) Esme Ashford (second round)

== Draw ==
Key

- Q = Qualifier
- WC = Wild card
- LL = Lucky loser
- Alt = Alternate
- ITF = ITF entry
- PR = Protected ranking
- SR = Special ranking
- SE = Special exempt
- JE = Junior exempt
- JR = Junior Accelerator Programme entrant
- CO = College Accelerator Programme entrant
- NG = Next Gen Accelerator Program entrant
- w/o = Walkover
- r = Retired
- d = Defaulted

=== Finals ===
Quarterfinals
1	(United States) Louise Brough	6	6
(Australia) Sadie Newcombe	2	2
4	(Australia) Joyce Fitch	7	0	6
5	(Australia) Thelma Long	5	6	4
6	(Australia) Mary Hawton	0	2
3	(Australia) Nancye Bolton	6	6
7	(Australia) Nell Hopman	0	1
2	(United States) Doris Hart	6	6

Semifinals
1	(United States) Louise Brough	6	6
4	(Australia) Joyce Fitch	4	4
3	(Australia) Nancye Bolton	2	3
2	(United States) Doris Hart	6	6

Finals
1	(United States) Louise Brough	6	3	6
2	(United States) Doris Hart	4	6	4

=== Top half ===
First round
1	(United States) L Brough	6	6
(Australia) L Nichols	0	0
(Australia) D Jenkins	6	6
(Australia) J Spehr-Jones	1	1
8	(Australia) E Ashford	3	9	6
(Australia) M Wallis	6	7	1
(Australia) S Newcombe	6	6
(Australia) N Ellis	2	1
4	(Australia) J Fitch	6	6
(Australia) F Chamberlin	3	1
(Australia) G Thiele	6	7
(Australia) R Strahan	3	5
5	(Australia) T Long	6	6
(Australia) R Lemke	0	1
(Australia) J Warnock
(Australia) P Finn	w/o

Second round
1	(United States) L Brough	6	6
(Australia) D Jenkins	1	2
8	(Australia) E Ashford	3	4
(Australia) S Newcombe	6	6
4	(Australia) J Fitch	6	6
(Australia) G Thiele	3	4
5	(Australia) T Long	6	6
(Australia) J Warnock	2	1

Quarterfinals
1	(United States) L Brough	6	6
(Australia) S Newcombe	2	2
4	(Australia) J Fitch	7	0	6
5	(Australia) T Long	5	6	4

Semifinals
1	(United States) L Brough	6	6
4	(Australia) J Fitch	4	4

=== Bottom half ===
First round
(Australia) M Toomey	6	7
(Australia) S Jackson	2	5
6	(Australia) M Hawton	6	6
(Australia) M Exelby	2	2
(Australia) C Borelli
(Australia) B Penrose	w/o
3	(Australia) Bolton	6	6
(Australia) PCunningham	0	0
(Australia) B McIntyre
(Australia) G Bryant	w/o
7	(Australia) N Hopman	6	6
(Australia) E Robertson	3	1
(Australia) C Proctor	6	6
(Australia) P Southcombe	4	3
2	(United States) D Hart	6	6
(Australia) D Moran	2	2

Second round
(Australia) M Toomey	3	6
6	(Australia) M Hawton	6	8
(Australia) C Borelli	0	0
3	(Australia) N Bolton	6	6
(Australia) B McIntyre	6	2
7	(Australia) N Hopman	8	6
(Australia) C Proctor	2	3
2	(United States) D Hart	6	6

Quarterfinals
6	(Australia) M Hawton	0	2
3	(Australia) N Bolton	6	6
7	(Australia) N Hopman	0	1
2	(United States) D Hart	6	6

Semifinals
3	(Australia) N Bolton	2	3
2	(United States) D Hart	6	6

Preceded by 1949 U.S. National Championships – Women's singles	Grand Slam women's singles	Succeeded by 1950 French Championships – Women's singles
