= 1949 Australian Championships =

- Date: 22–31 January 1949
- Edition: 37th
- Category: Grand Slam (ITF)
- Surface: Grass
- Location: Adelaide, Australia
- Venue: Memorial Drive

Champions

Men's singles
- (Australia) Frank Sedgman

Women's singles
- (United States) Doris Hart

Men's doubles
- (Australia) John Bromwich / (Australia) Adrian Quist

Women's doubles
- (Australia) Thelma Coyne Long / (Australia) Nancye Wynne Bolton

Mixed doubles
- (United States) Doris Hart / (Australia) Frank Sedgman
- Australian Championships

The 1949 Australian Championships was a tennis tournament that took place on outdoor Grass courts at the Memorial Drive, Adelaide, Australia from 21 January to 31 January. It was the 37th edition of the Australian Championships (now known as the Australian Open), the 9th held in Adelaide, and the first Grand Slam tournament of the year.

During the Australian Championships, men's singles and doubles, women's singles and doubles and mixed doubles was played throughout the ten days. In the men's singles, 40 players participated in the tournament to try to claim the title from defending champion, Adrian Quist. After he fell in the quarter-finals, the men's final was played between fourth-seed Frank Sedgman and top seed John Bromwich with Sedgman taking out his first Grand Slam singles title winning in straight sets. In the women's, 30 players attempted to take the title from defending champion, Nancye Bolton. In the final it was between American and top-seeded player, Doris Hart and second seed Bolton with the American coming out on top in straight sets. Bolton and Bromwich would take out their respective doubles competitions with partners Adrian Quist and Thelma Coyne Long with Hart and Sedgman taking out the mixed doubles title.

== Finals ==
=== Men's singles ===
(Australia) Frank Sedgman defeated (Australia) John Bromwich 6–3, 6–2, 6–2

=== Women's singles ===
(United States) Doris Hart defeated (Australia) Nancye Wynne Bolton 6–3, 6–4

=== Men's doubles ===
(Australia) John Bromwich / (Australia) Adrian Quist defeated (Australia) Geoff Brown / (Australia) Bill Sidwell 6–8, 7–5, 6–2, 6–3

=== Women's doubles ===
(Australia) Thelma Coyne Long / (Australia) Nancye Wynne Bolton defeated (United States) Doris Hart / (Australia) Marie Toomey 6–0, 6–1

=== Mixed doubles ===
(United States) Doris Hart / (Australia) Frank Sedgman defeated (Australia) Joyce Fitch / (Australia) John Bromwich 6–1, 5–7, 12–10

Preceded by 1948 U.S. National Championships	Grand Slams	Succeeded by 1949 French Championships
