= 1947 U.S. National Championships – Women's singles =

Women's singles
- 1947 U.S. National Championships

Final
- Champion: (United States) Louise Brough
- Runner-up: (United States) Margaret Osborne
- Score: 8–6, 4–6, 6–1

Events
| Singles | men | women |
| Doubles | men | women |
| ← 1946 · | U.S. National Championships | · 1948 → |

Second-seeded Louise Brough defeated first-seeded Margaret Osborne 8–6, 4–6, 6–1 in the final to win the women's singles tennis title at the 1947 U.S. National Championships.

== Seeds ==
The tournament used two lists of players for seeding the women's singles event; one for U.S. players and one for foreign players. Louise Brough is the champion; others show in brackets the round in which they were eliminated.

1. (United States) Margaret Osborne (finalist)
2. (United States) Louise Brough (champion)
3. (United States) Doris Hart (semifinals)
4. (United States) Patricia Todd (quarterfinals)
5. (United States) Shirley Fry (third round)
6. (United States) Mary Arnold Prentiss (third round)
7. (United States) Dorothy Head (quarterfinals)
8. (United States) Barbara Krase (quarterfinals)
9. (Australia) Nancye Bolton (semifinals)
10. (United Kingdom) Betty Hilton (third round)
11. (United Kingdom) Molly Blair (second round)
12. (Romania) Magda Rurac (quarterfinals)
13. (Australia) Nell Hopman (second round)
14. (United Kingdom) Joy Gannon (first round)
15. (United Kingdom) Jean Quertier (third round)
16. (Canada) Elaine Fildes (first round)

== Draw ==
=== Final eight ===
Quarterfinals
1 | (United States) Margaret Osborne | 6 | 6
(4) | (Romania) Magda Rurac | 4 | 4
8 | (United States) Barbara Krase | 6 | 2
3 | (United States) Doris Hart | 8 | 6
4 | (United States) Patricia Todd | 4 | 1
(1) | (Australia) Nancye Bolton | 6 | 6
7 | (United States) Dorothy Head | 8 | 2 | 0
2 | (United States) Louise Brough | 6 | 6 | 6

Semifinals
1 | (United States) Margaret Osborne | 7 | 7
3 | (United States) Doris Hart | 5 | 5
(1) | (Australia) Nancye Bolton | 6 | 4 | 5
2 | (United States) Louise Brough | 2 | 6 | 7

Finals
1 | (United States) Margaret Osborne | 6 | 6 | 1
2 | (United States) Louise Brough | 8 | 4 | 6

| Preceded by 1947 Wimbledon Championships – Women's singles | Grand Slam women's singles | Succeeded by 1948 Australian Championships – Women's singles |
