= 1955 U.S. National Championships – Women's singles =

Women's singles
- 1955 U.S. National Championships

Final
- Champion: (United States) Doris Hart
- Runner-up: (United Kingdom) Pat Ward
- Score: 6–4, 6–2

Details
- Seeds: 8

Events
Singles	men	women
Doubles	men	women
- U.S. National Championships

First-seeded Doris Hart defeated unseeded Patricia Ward 6–4, 6–2 in the final to win the women's singles tennis title at the 1955 U.S. National Championships. Hart won the tournament without losing a set.

== Seeds ==
The seeded players are listed below. Doris Hart is the champion; others show in brackets the round in which they were eliminated.

1. (United States) Doris Hart (champion)
2. (United States) Louise Brough (third round)
3. (United States) Beverly Baker Fleitz (semifinals)
4. (United States) Dorothy Knode (semifinals)
5. (United States) Barbara Davidson (quarterfinals)
6. (United States) Shirley Fry (third round)
7. (United States) Dorothy Bundy Cheney (first round)
8. (United States) Barbara Breit (semifinals)

== Draw ==
=== Key ===
- Q = Qualifier
- WC = Wild card
- LL = Lucky loser
- r = Retired

=== Final eight ===
Quarterfinals
1	(United States) Doris Hart	6	6
(United States) Nancy Chaffee	4	4
6	(United States) Shirley Fry	7	6
4	(United States) Dorothy Knode	9	8
3	(United States) Beverly Baker Fleitz	6	6	0
8	(United States) Barbara Breit	8	4	6
(United Kingdom) Patricia Ward	9	6
(United States) Belmar Gunderson	7	0

Semifinals
1	(United States) Doris Hart	6	6
4	(United States) Dorothy Knode	1	1
8	(United States) Barbara Breit	1	2
(United Kingdom) Patricia Ward	6	6

Finals
1	(United States) Doris Hart	6	6
(United Kingdom) Patricia Ward	4	2

Preceded by 1955 Wimbledon Championships – Women's singles	Grand Slam women's singles	Succeeded by 1956 Australian Championships – Women's singles
