= 1948 U.S. National Championships – Women's singles =

Women's singles
- 1948 U.S. National Championships

Final
- Champion: (United States) Margaret Osborne duPont
- Runner-up: (United States) Louise Brough
- Score: 4–6, 6–4, 15–13

Events
| Singles | men | women |
| Doubles | men | women |
| ← 1947 · | U.S. National Championships | · 1949 → |

Third-seeded Margaret Osborne duPont defeated Louise Brough 4–6, 6–4, 15–13 in the final to win the women's singles tennis title at the 1948 U.S. National Championships.

== Seeds ==
The seven seeded U.S. players are listed below. Margaret Osborne duPont is the champion; others show in brackets the round in which they were eliminated.

1. (United States) Louise Brough (finalist)
2. (United States) Doris Hart (quarterfinals)
3. (United States) Margaret Osborne duPont (champion)
4. (United States) Pat Canning Todd (semifinals)
5. (United States) Shirley Fry (third round)
6. (United States) Beverly Baker (quarterfinals)
7. (United States) Gussy Moran (semifinals)

== Draw ==
=== Key ===
- Q = Qualifier
- WC = Wild card
- LL = Lucky loser
- r = Retired

=== Final eight ===
Quarterfinals
7 | (United States) Gussy Moran | 6 | 6
2 | (United States) Doris Hart | 4 | 4
3 | (United States) Margaret Osborne duPont | 1 | 6 | 6
(United States) Beverly Baker | 6 | 2 | 0
1 | (United States) Louise Brough | 6 | 6
(United States) Virginia Kovacs | 3 | 2
4 | (United States) Pat Canning Todd | 6 | 6
(United States) Madge Vosters | 3 | 1

Semifinals
7 | (United States) Gussy Moran | 8 | 4
3 | (United States) Margaret Osborne duPont | 10 | 6
1 | (United States) Louise Brough | 6 | 6
4 | (United States) Pat Canning Todd | 3 | 3

Finals
3 | (United States) Margaret Osborne duPont | 4 | 6 | 15
1 | (United States) Louise Brough | 6 | 4 | 13

| Preceded by 1948 Wimbledon Championships – Women's singles | Grand Slam women's singles | Succeeded by 1949 Australian Championships – Women's singles |
