= Magda Rurac =

Romanian tennis player

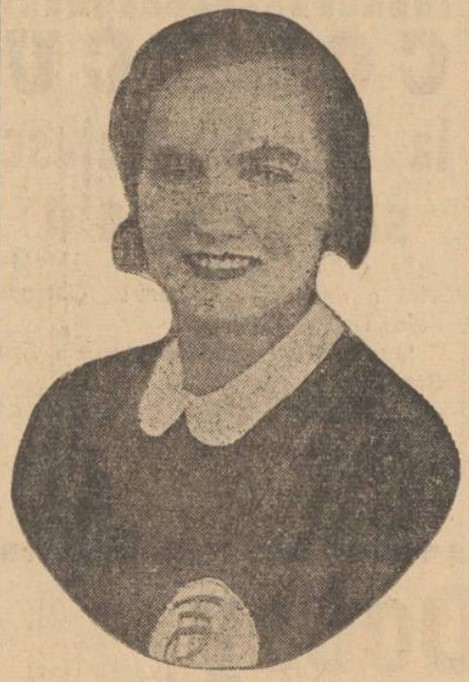
- Rurac in 1940.
- Country (sports): Romania
- Born: 11 July 1918 Oradea. Romania
- Died: 9 May 1995 (aged 76) New York, United States

Singles
- Highest ranking: No. 7 (1947)

Grand Slam singles results
- French Open: QF (1947)
- Wimbledon: 4R (1947)
- US Open: QF (1947, 1951)

Grand Slam doubles results
- French Open: SF (1947)
- Wimbledon: 2R (1947)

Grand Slam mixed doubles results
- Wimbledon: 3R (1947)

Magda Rurac (née Berescu;11 July 1918 – 9 May 1995) was a Romanian tennis player in the 1940s and 1950s.

Rurac was ranked in the top 10 in unofficial world rankings in 1948 and 1949. For that reason, she is considered by many to be one of the best female players to come out of Romania. She played for Romania's Federation Cup team. Despite being Romanian, she was ranked in the U.S. Top Ten during her stay in the country. She was ranked No. 9 in 1951.

At the tennis tournament in Cincinnati, Rurac reached seven finals: four in doubles and three in singles. She won the singles title in 1949 and was a finalist in 1950 and 1951. She won three titles in her four doubles finals appearances, with titles coming in 1948 (with Dorothy Head), 1949 (with Nancy Morrison) and 1950 (with Beverly Baker Fleitz). Her other doubles finals appearance was in 1951 (with Sue Herr).

She won the singles title at the U.S. Women's Clay Court Championships in 1948 and 1949.

Magda was married to Vinnie Rurac, who served as the tennis pro at the Concord Resort Hotel in Kiamesha Lake (in the upstate New York Catskill Mountains "Borscht Belt") during the 1970s.
