= Beryl Bartlett =

South African tennis player (born 1924)

- Country (sports): South Africa
- Born: 28 May 1924; South Africa
- Died: 17 November 2017 (aged 93); South Africa

Singles

Grand Slam singles results
- Wimbledon: 2R (1951, 1952)

Doubles

Grand Slam doubles results
- French Open: F (1951)
- Wimbledon: 3R (1951, 1952)

Grand Slam mixed doubles results
- Wimbledon: 4R (1951)

Beryl Olive Bartlett (née Nicholas; 28 May 1924 – 17 November 2017) was a tennis player from South Africa who was active in the 1950s.

== Career ==
Bartlett teamed with American player Barbara Scofield to reach the doubles final at the 1951 French Championships. In the final, they lost in straight sets to Doris Hart and Shirley Fry. Her best Grand Slam performance in the singles was reaching the second round at the Wimbledon Championships in 1951 and 1952. Partnering Nigel Cockburn, she reached the fourth round of the mixed doubles at the 1951 Wimbledon Championships, losing to the top-seeded pairing Louise Brough and Eric Sturgess. Also in 1951, she won the All England Plate, a competition consisting of players who were defeated in the first or second rounds of the Wimbledon singles competition. In the final, she defeated Georgie Woodgate in three sets.

In 1951 and 1952, she reached the singles final at the West of England Championships, played on grass courts in Bristol, but she lost on both occasions to American players Beverly Baker and Patricia Canning Todd respectively. In June 1952, she won the singles title at the Oslo international tournament, defeating Beryl Penrose in the final.

She was part of a South African team, with Hazel Redick-Smith, Nigel Cockburn and Eric Sturgess, who played a number of test matches against an Australian team in South Africa in February and March 1952.

== Grand Slam finals ==
=== Doubles: (1 runner-up) ===
Result	Year	Championship	Surface	Partner	Opponents	Score
Loss	1951	French Championships	Clay	(United States) Barbara Scofield	(United States) Shirley Fry (United States) Doris Hart	8–10, 3–6
