= 1951 French Championships (tennis) =

- Date: 23 May – 3 June 1951
- Edition: 50
- Category: 21st Grand Slam (ITF)
- Surface: Clay
- Location: Paris (XVI^{e}), France
- Venue: Stade Roland Garros

Champions

Men's singles
- (Kingdom of Egypt) Jaroslav Drobný

Women's singles
- (United States) Shirley Fry

Men's doubles
- (Australia) Ken McGregor / (Australia) Frank Sedgman

Women's doubles
- (United States) Doris Hart / (United States) Shirley Fry

Mixed doubles
- (United States) Doris Hart / (Australia) Frank Sedgman
← 1950 ·	French Championships	· 1952 →

The 1951 French Championships (now known as the French Open) was a tennis tournament that took place on the outdoor clay courts at the Stade Roland-Garros in Paris, France. The tournament ran from 23 May until 3 June. It was the 55th staging of the French Championships, and the second Grand Slam tennis event of 1951. Jaroslav Drobný and Shirley Fry won the singles titles.

== Finals ==
=== Men's singles ===
(Egypt) Jaroslav Drobný defeated (South Africa) Eric Sturgess 6–3, 6–3, 6–3

=== Women's singles ===
(United States) Shirley Fry defeated (United States) Doris Hart 6–3, 3–6, 6–3

=== Men's doubles ===
(Australia) Ken McGregor / (Australia) Frank Sedgman defeated (United States) Gardnar Mulloy / (United States) Dick Savitt 6–2, 2–6, 9–7, 7–5

=== Women's doubles ===
(United States) Shirley Fry / (United States) Doris Hart defeated (South Africa) Beryl Bartlett / (United States) Barbara Scofield 10–8, 6–3

=== Mixed doubles ===
(United States) Doris Hart / (Australia) Frank Sedgman defeated (Australia) Thelma Coyne Long / (Australia) Mervyn Rose 7–5, 6–2

Preceded by 1951 Australian Championships	Grand Slams	Succeeded by 1951 Wimbledon Championships
