= Kay Tuckey =

English tennis player

- Full name: Katherine Lilian Agnes Tuckey
- Country (sports): United Kingdom
- Born: 1921 or 1922 Godalming, England
- Died: 14 May 2016

Singles
- Highest ranking: No. 10 (1951)

Grand Slam singles results
- Wimbledon: QF (1951)
- US Open: QF (1951)

Grand Slam doubles results
- Wimbledon: QF (1950, 1951)

Grand Slam mixed doubles results
- Wimbledon: 4R (1949)

Katherine "Kay" Tuckey, also known by her married name Kay Maule, (1921/1922 – 14 May 2016) was an English female tennis player who was active from the second half of the 1940s until the early 1950s.

== Early life ==
Tuckey was born in Godalming, Surrey. She attended St Catherine's School at Bramley. When the family moved to Bournemouth she went to the local Talbot Heath School. She joined West Hants Lawn Tennis Club, venue of the British Hard Court Championships, when she was 12.

== Career ==
Tuckey won the Rhine Army Championships, held in Hamburg, Germany, in 1946.

Between 1947 and 1951 she competed in five Wimbledon Championships. Her best singles result was reaching the quarterfinal in 1951 where she was defeated by top-seeded Louise Brough in three sets after winning the first set. In doubles she reached the quarterfinals in 1950 and 1951 with compatriots Betty Harrison and Jean Quertier respectively. In 1950 she won the All England Plate, a competition held at the Wimbledon Championships for players who were defeated in the first or second rounds of the singles event. In the final she defeated Betty Rosenquest in straight sets.

At the 1951 U.S. Championships she was the third-seeded foreign player and reached the quarterfinal after a victory in the third round against sixth-seeded Beverly Baker. She lost the quarterfinal in three sets to second-seeded Shirley Fry.

With Betty Hilton she won the doubles title at the British Hard Court Championships in May 1950 against Jean Quertier and Jean Walker-Smith. The level of play in the three-sets final, watched by Wightman Cup selectors, was described as poor. She played for the British team in the Wightman Cup, an annual team tennis competition for women contested between teams from the United States and Great Britain, from 1949 until 1951.

According to John Olliff of The Daily Telegraph, Tuckey achieved a highest career ranking of world No. 10 in 1951.

== Personal life ==
In 1951 she met her future husband John Maule and they married later that year in Bournemouth. The couple had four children.

Her mother, Agnes Tuckey, and brother, Raymond Tuckey, were also tennis players.
