= Jean Quertier =

British tennis player (1925–2019)

- Full name: Jean De Mouilpied Rinkel-Quertier
- Country (sports): United Kingdom
- Born: 12 November 1925 London, England
- Died: 23 January 2019 (aged 93) Rotterdam, Netherlands
- Plays: Right–handed

Singles
- Highest ranking: No. 6 (1951) (Note: According to John Olliff of The Daily Telegraph)

Grand Slam singles results
- French Open: QF (1949, 1953)
- Wimbledon: QF (1948, 1952)
- US Open: QF (1951, 1953)

Grand Slam doubles results
- French Open: SF (1947, 1949, 1951, 1953)
- Wimbledon: SF (1952, 1953)

Grand Slam mixed doubles results
- French Open: F (1949)
- Wimbledon: QF (1949, 1950, 1951, 1953)

Team competitions
- Wightman Cup: F (1947, 1949, 1950, 1951, 1952, 1953)

Jean Rinkel-Quertier (née Quertier; 12 November 1925 – 23 January 2019), was a female former tennis player from England who was active in the late 1940s and 1950s.

== Career ==
Her best performance at a Grand Slam tournament was reaching the final of the mixed doubles event at the 1949 French Championships. Partnering Gerry Oakley, she lost the final to the South African team of Sheila Piercey Summers and Eric Sturgess in straight sets. She reached the semifinals of the doubles event at the 1952 and 1953 Wimbledon Championships partnering compatriot Susan Partridge and Helen Fletcher respectively. They lost on both occasions in straight sets to the eventual champions and first-seeded team of Shirley Fry and Doris Hart. Her best Grand Slam singles performance was reaching the quarterfinals of the French (1949, 1953), Wimbledon (1948, 1952) and U.S. Championships (1951, 1953).

In 1949 and 1950, she played against compatriot Joan Curry in the final of the British Covered Court Championships, played on wooden courts at the Queen's Club in London, and won the 1950 edition in three sets. In 1949, she was the runner-up at the British Hard Court Championships. Quertier won the singles event of the French Covered Court Championships in 1951 and 1952.

With Jean Walker-Smith, she won the doubles title at the Italian Championships in Rome in 1950, defeating Betty Hilton and Kay Tuckey in the final in three sets.

Quertier was a member of the British Wightman Cup team in 1947 and from 1949 to 1953. These editions of the team tennis competition were all won by the United States team, and Quertier won the only match for Britain when she defeated Shirley Fry in 1951 in straight sets.

== Personal life ==
She married Dutch tennis player Ivo Rinkel on 28 February 1952 in Roehampton, and the couple had two daughters.

== Grand Slam finals ==
=== Mixed doubles (1 runner-up) ===
Result	Year	Championship	Surface	Partner	Opponents	Score
Loss	1949	French Championships	Clay	(United Kingdom) Gerry Oakley	(South Africa) Sheila Piercey Summers (South Africa) Eric Sturgess	1–6, 1–6
