= Patricia Ward Hales =

British tennis player (1929–1985)

- Full name: Patricia Evelyn Ward Hales
- Country (sports): United Kingdom
- Born: 27 February 1929 London, England
- Died: 22 June 1985 (aged 56)

Singles
- Highest ranking: No. 8 (1956)

Grand Slam singles results
- French Open: 3R (1955)
- Wimbledon: SF (1956)
- US Open: F (1955)

Doubles

Grand Slam doubles results
- French Open: F (1955, 1960)
- Wimbledon: F (1955)

Mixed doubles

Grand Slam mixed doubles results
- French Open: QF (1954)
- Wimbledon: SF (1953)

Patricia Ward Hales (née Ward; 27 February 1929 – 22 June 1985) was a tennis player from the United Kingdom who reached the singles final of the 1955 U.S. Championships, losing to Doris Hart.

Hales partnered Shirley Bloomer to reach the women's doubles final at the 1955 Wimbledon Championships, where they lost to the team of Angela Mortimer and Anne Shilcock in two sets and at the French Championships, where they lost to the team of Darlene Hard and Beverly Baker Fleitz in three sets. She again reached the women's doubles final at the French Championships, where she and Ann Haydon lost to the team of Hard and Maria Bueno in straight sets.

With George Worthington, she reached the semifinals of the mixed doubles at Wimbledon in 1953. She won the singles title at the Italian Open in 1955, beating Erika Vollmer; she also won the doubles with Christiane Mercelis. Ward had been runner-up to Maureen Connolly in 1954. Also in 1955, she won Monte Carlo, beating Shirley Bloomer. She reached the semifinals at Wimbledon in 1956, beating Angela Mortimer in straight sets, then lost to Angela Buxton. She reached the final of the British Hard Court Championships in 1957, scoring victories over Darlene Hard and Ann Haydon on the way, then losing in three sets to Shirley Bloomer. At Wimbledon in 1958, she defeated the seeded Karol Fageros, then lost to Ann Haydon in three sets in the round of 16.

According to Lance Tingay of The Daily Telegraph and the Daily Mail, Hales was ranked in the world top 10 in 1955 and 1956, reaching a career high of world No. 8 in 1956.

== Grand Slam finals ==
=== Singles (1 runner-up) ===
Result	Year	Championship	Surface	Opponent	Score
Loss	1955	U.S. Championships	Grass	(United States) Doris Hart	4–6, 2–6

=== Doubles (3 runner-ups) ===
Result	Year	Championship	Surface	Partner	Opponents	Score
Loss	1955	French Championships	Clay	(United Kingdom) Shirley Bloomer	(United States) Beverly Baker (United States) Darlene Hard	5–7, 8–6, 11–13
Loss	1955	Wimbledon	Grass	(United Kingdom) Shirley Bloomer	(United Kingdom) Angela Mortimer (United Kingdom) Anne Shilcock	5–7, 1–6
Loss	1960	French Championships	Clay	(United Kingdom) Ann Jones	(Brazil) Maria Bueno (United States) Darlene Hard	2–6, 5–7

== Grand Slam singles tournament timeline ==
Key
W	F	SF	QF	#R	RR	Q#	DNQ	A	NH

(W) winner; (F) finalist; (SF) semifinalist; (QF) quarterfinalist; (#R) rounds 4, 3, 2, 1; (RR) round-robin stage; (Q#) qualification round; (DNQ) did not qualify; (A) absent; (NH) not held; (SR) strike rate (events won / competed); (W–L) win–loss record.

Tournament	1949	1950	1951	1952	1953	1954	1955	1956	1957	1958	1959	1960	1961	Career SR
Australian Championships	A	A	A	A	A	A	A	A	A	A	A	A	A	0 / 0
French Championships	A	A	A	2R	A	A	3R	A	A	3R	3R	2R	A	0 / 5
Wimbledon	1R	2R	2R	3R	3R	4R	2R	SF	1R	4R	3R	2R	2R	0 / 13
U.S. Championships	A	A	3R	A	A	A	F	A	A	A	A	A	A	0 / 2
SR	0 / 1	0 / 1	0 / 2	0 / 2	0 / 1	0 / 1	0 / 3	0 / 1	0 / 1	0 / 2	0 / 2	0 / 2	0 / 1	0 / 20

== See also ==
- Performance timelines for all female tennis players since 1978 who reached at least one Grand Slam final
