= Shirley Fry =

American tennis and badminton player (1927–2021)

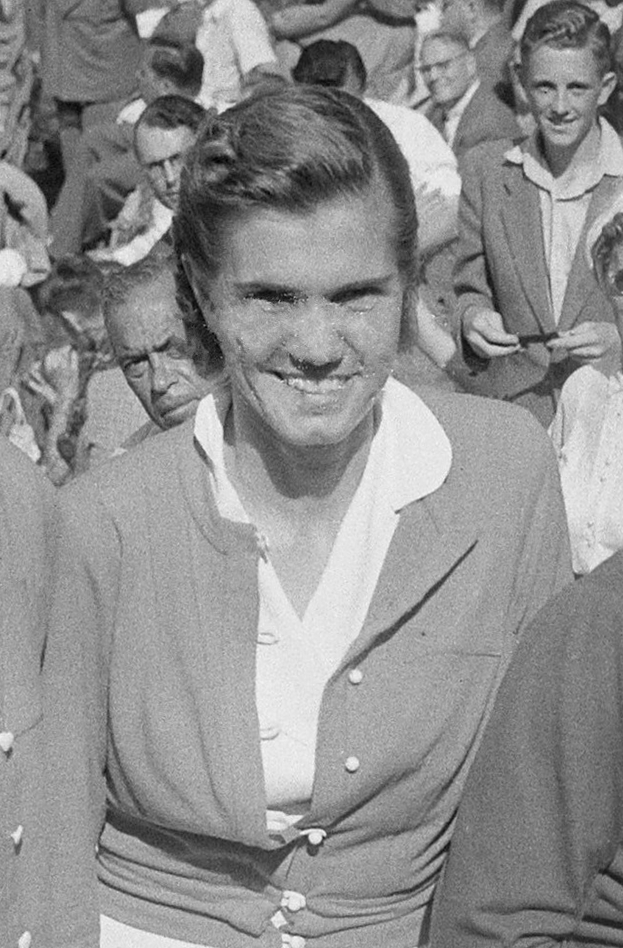
- Fry in the Netherlands in 1953
- Full name: Shirley June Fry Irvin
- Country (sports): United States
- Born: June 30, 1927 Akron, Ohio, United States
- Died: July 13, 2021 (aged 94) Naples, Florida, United States
- Height: 5 ft 5 in (1.65 m)
- Retired: 1957
- Plays: Right–handed
- Int. Tennis HoF: 1970 (member page)

Singles
- Career record: 596-146 (80.3%)
- Career titles: 63
- Highest ranking: No. 1 (1956)

Grand Slam singles results
- Australian Open: W (1957)
- French Open: W (1951)
- Wimbledon: W (1956)
- US Open: W (1956)

Doubles
- Career record: 0–0

Grand Slam doubles results
- Australian Open: W (1957)
- French Open: W (1950, 1951, 1952, 1953)
- Wimbledon: W (1951, 1952, 1953)
- US Open: W (1951, 1952, 1953, 1954)

Grand Slam mixed doubles results
- French Open: F (1952)
- Wimbledon: W (1956)
- US Open: F (1951, 1955)

Team competitions
- Wightman Cup: W (1951, 1952, 1953, 1955, 1956)

Shirley June Fry Irvin (née Fry; June 30, 1927 – July 13, 2021) was an American tennis player. During her career, which lasted from the early 1940s until the mid-1950s, she won the singles title at all four Grand Slam events, as well as 13 doubles titles, and was ranked No. 1 in the world in 1956.

== Early life ==
Fry was born in Akron, Ohio, on June 30, 1927. She started playing tennis competitively at age nine. She was educated at Rollins College in Winter Park, Florida, graduating in 1949.

== Career ==
Fry was one of 10 women (Note: along with Maureen Connolly, Margaret Court, Steffi Graf, Doris Hart, Billie Jean King, Martina Navratilova, Chris Evert, Maria Sharapova, and Serena Williams.) to have won each Grand Slam singles tournament at least once during her career. She was also one of seven women (with Doris Hart, Margaret Court, Martina Navratilova, Pam Shriver, Serena Williams, and Venus Williams) to have won all four Grand Slam doubles tournaments. At the U.S. National Championship (precursor of the U.S. Open) in 1942, Fry reached the singles quarterfinals at the age of 15. At Wimbledon in 1953, Fry and Hart lost only four games during the entire women's doubles tournament and won three matches without losing a game, including the semifinals and finals, the latter over Connolly and Julia Sampson. Fry won the last three Grand Slam singles tournaments she entered, including wins over Althea Gibson in the Wimbledon quarterfinal and U.S. Championship final in 1956 and the Australian Championships final in 1957.

Fry was ranked in the world top 10 in 1946 and 1948 and from 1950 through 1955 (no rankings issued from 1940 through 1945), and No. 1 in 1956. The United States Lawn Tennis Association ranked her in the U.S. top 10 from 1944 through 1955 and No. 1 in 1956. She briefly retired in early 1956 and worked as a copygirl for the St. Petersburg Times. However, she returned later that spring after receiving an invitation to play in the Wightman Cup. She retired for the final time in 1957, and was inducted into the International Tennis Hall of Fame in 1970.

From 1951 through 1956, Fry participated in the Wightman Cup, the women's team competition between Great Britain and the United States, and contributed to the U.S. victory during each of these editions with the exception of 1954, when her final doubles rubber was not played. She compiled a 10–2 win–loss record.

== Later life ==
Fry married Karl Irvin in Australia in February 1957, after which she retired from top-level tennis. They remained married until his death from a heart attack in 1976. Together, they had four children: Mark, Scott, Lori and Karen.

Fry resided in Naples, Florida, during her later years. She died there on the night of July 13, 2021, at the age of 94. Prior to her death, she was the longest surviving female Grand Slam tournament and Wimbledon singles champion.

== Career statistics ==
=== Grand Slam tournament timelines ===
Key
W	F	SF	QF	#R	RR	Q#	DNQ	A	NH

(W) winner; (F) finalist; (SF) semifinalist; (QF) quarterfinalist; (#R) rounds 4, 3, 2, 1; (RR) round-robin stage; (Q#) qualification round; (DNQ) did not qualify; (A) absent; (NH) not held; (SR) strike rate (events won / competed); (W–L) win–loss record.

==== Singles ====
Tournament	1941	1942	1943	1944	1945	1946^{1}	1947^{1}	1948	1949	1950	1951	1952	1953	1954	1955	1956	1957	Career SR
Australian Championships	NH	NH	NH	NH	NH	A	A	A	A	A	A	A	A	A	A	A	W	1 / 1
French Championships	R	R	R	R	A	A	A	F	A	QF	W	F	SF	A	A	A	A	1 / 5
Wimbledon	NH	NH	NH	NH	NH	A	A	QF	4R	QF	F	SF	SF	QF	A	W	A	1 / 8
U.S. Championships	1R	QF	1R	QF	1R	1R	3R	3R	3R	QF	F	SF	SF	SF	QF	W	A	1 / 16
SR	0 / 1	0 / 1	0 / 1	0 / 1	0 / 1	0 / 1	0 / 1	0 / 3	0 / 2	0 / 3	1 / 3	0 / 3	0 / 3	0 / 2	0 / 1	2 / 2	1 / 1	4 / 30

==== Doubles ====
Tournament	1941	1942	1943	1944	1945	1946^{1}	1947^{1}	1948	1949	1950	1951	1952	1953	1954	1955	1956	1957	Career SR
Australian Championships	A	NH	NH	NH	NH	NH	A	A	A	A	A	A	A	A	A	A	W	1 / 1
French Championships	R	R	R	R	A	A	A	F	A	W	W	W	W	A	A	A	A	4 / 5
Wimbledon	NH	NH	NH	NH	NH	A	A	3R	SF	F	W	W	W	F	A	SF	A	3 / 8
U.S. Championships	A	1R	1R	QF	SF	SF	SF	SF	F	F	W	W	W	W	F	F	A	4 / 15
SR	0 / 0	0 / 1	0 / 1	0 / 1	0 / 1	0 / 1	0 / 1	0 / 3	0 / 2	1 / 3	3 / 3	3 / 3	3 / 3	1 / 2	0 / 1	0 / 2	1 / 1	12 / 29

R = tournament restricted to French nationals and held under German occupation.
^{1}In 1946 and 1947, the French Championships were held after Wimbledon.

=== Grand Slam tournament finals ===
==== Singles: 8 (4 titles, 4 runners-up) ====
Result	Year	Championship	Surface	Opponent	Score
Loss	1948	French Championships	Clay	(France) Nelly Adamson Landry	2–6, 6–0, 0–6
Win	1951	French Championships	Clay	(United States) Doris Hart	6–3, 3–6, 6–3
Loss	1951	Wimbledon	Grass	(United States) Doris Hart	1–6, 0–6
Loss	1951	U.S. Championships	Grass	(United States) Maureen Connolly	3–6, 6–1, 4–6
Loss	1952	French Championships	Clay	(United States) Doris Hart	4–6, 4–6
Win	1956	Wimbledon	Grass	(United Kingdom) Angela Buxton	6–3, 6–1
Win	1956	U.S. Championships	Grass	(United States) Althea Gibson	6–3, 6–4
Win	1957	Australian Championships	Grass	(United States) Althea Gibson	6–3, 6–4

==== Doubles: 19 (12 titles, 7 runners-up) ====
Result	Year	Championship	Surface	Partner	Opponents	Score
Loss	1948	French Championships	Clay	(United States) Mary Arnold	(United States) Doris Hart (United States) Patricia Canning Todd	4–6, 2–6
Loss	1949	U.S. Championships	Grass	(United States) Doris Hart	(United States) Louise Brough (United States) Margaret Osborne duPont	4–6, 8–10
Win	1950	French Championships	Clay	(United States) Doris Hart	(United States) Louise Brough (United States) Margaret Osborne duPont	1–6, 7–5, 6–2
Loss	1950	Wimbledon	Grass	(United States) Doris Hart	(United States) Louise Brough (United States) Margaret Osborne duPont	4–6, 7–5, 1–6
Loss	1950	U.S. Championships	Grass	(United States) Doris Hart	(United States) Louise Brough (United States) Margaret Osborne duPont	2–6, 3–6
Win	1951	French Championships	Clay	(United States) Doris Hart	(South Africa) Beryl Bartlett (United States) Barbara Scofield	10–8, 6–3
Win	1951	Wimbledon	Grass	(United States) Doris Hart	(United States) Louise Brough (United States) Margaret Osborne duPont	6–2, 13–11
Win	1951	U.S. Championships	Grass	(United States) Doris Hart	(United States) Nancy Chaffee (United States) Patricia Canning Todd	6–4, 6–2
Win	1952	French Championships	Clay	(United States) Doris Hart	(South Africa) Hazel Redick-Smith (South Africa) Julia Wipplinger	7–5, 6–1
Win	1952	Wimbledon	Grass	(United States) Doris Hart	(United States) Louise Brough (United States) Maureen Connolly	8–6, 6–3
Win	1952	U.S. Championships	Grass	(United States) Doris Hart	(United States) Louise Brough (United States) Maureen Connolly	10–8, 6–4
Win	1953	French Championships	Clay	(United States) Doris Hart	(United States) Maureen Connolly (United States) Julia Sampson	6–4, 6–3
Win	1953	Wimbledon	Grass	(United States) Doris Hart	(United States) Maureen Connolly (United States) Julia Sampson	6–0, 6–0
Win	1953	U.S. Championships	Grass	(United States) Doris Hart	(United States) Louise Brough (United States) Margaret Osborne duPont	6–2, 7–9, 9–7
Loss	1954	Wimbledon	Grass	(United States) Doris Hart	(United States) Louise Brough (United States) Margaret Osborne duPont	6–4, 7–9, 1–6
Win	1954	U.S. Championships	Grass	(United States) Doris Hart	(United States) Louise Brough (United States) Margaret Osborne duPont	6–4, 6–4
Loss	1955	U.S. Championships	Grass	(United States) Doris Hart	(United States) Louise Brough (United States) Margaret Osborne duPont	3–6, 6–1, 3–6
Loss	1956	U.S. Championships	Grass	(United States) Betty Rosenquest	(United States) Louise Brough (United States) Margaret Osborne duPont	3–6, 0–6
Win	1957	Australian Championships	Grass	(United States) Althea Gibson	(Australia) Mary Bevis Hawton (Australia) Fay Muller	6–2, 6–1

==== Mixed doubles: 5 (1 title, 4 runners-up) ====
Result	Year	Championship	Surface	Partner	Opponents	Score
Loss	1951	U.S. Championships	Grass	(Australia) Mervyn Rose	(United States) Doris Hart (Australia) Frank Sedgman	3–6, 2–6
Loss	1952	French Championships	Clay	(South Africa) Eric Sturgess	(United States) Doris Hart (Australia) Frank Sedgman	8–6, 3–6, 3–6
Loss	1953	Wimbledon	Grass	(Argentina) Enrique Morea	(United States) Doris Hart (United States) Vic Seixas	7–9, 5–7
Loss	1955	U.S. Championships	Grass	(United States) Gardnar Mulloy	(United States) Doris Hart (United States) Vic Seixas	5–7, 7–5, 2–6
Win	1956	Wimbledon	Grass	(United States) Vic Seixas	(United States) Gardnar Mulloy (United States) Althea Gibson	2–6, 6–2, 7–5

== See also ==
- Performance timelines for all female tennis players since 1978 who reached at least one Grand Slam final
