= Doris Hart =

American tennis player (1925–2015)

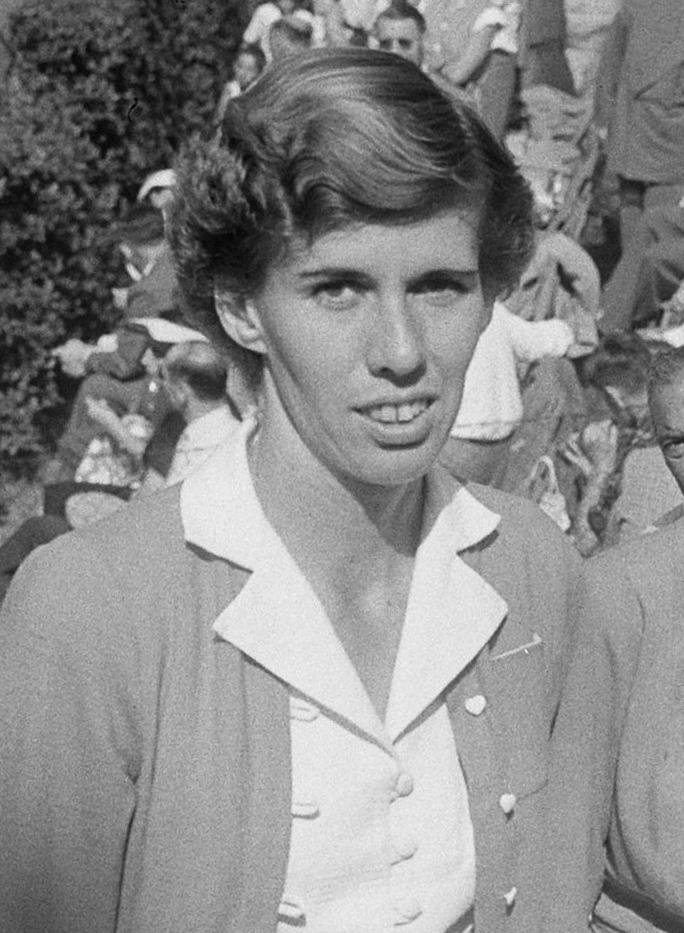
- Hart in 1953
- Country (sports): United States
- Born: June 20, 1925 St. Louis, Missouri, U.S.
- Died: May 29, 2015 (aged 89) Coral Gables, Florida, U.S.
- Retired: 1955 (but played at the 1968 Wimbledon Championships and the 1969 US Open)
- College: University of Miami
- Int. Tennis HoF: 1969 (member page)

Singles
- Career record: 679–123
- Career titles: 86
- Highest ranking: No. 1 (1951)

Grand Slam singles results
- Australian Open: W (1949)
- French Open: W (1950, 1952)
- Wimbledon: W (1951)
- US Open: W (1954, 1955)

Doubles
- Career record: 0–0

Grand Slam doubles results
- Australian Open: W (1950)
- French Open: W (1948, 1950, 1951, 1952, 1953)
- Wimbledon: W (1947, 1951, 1952, 1953)
- US Open: W (1951, 1952, 1953, 1954)

Grand Slam mixed doubles results
- Australian Open: W (1949, 1950)
- French Open: W (1951, 1952, 1953)
- Wimbledon: W (1951, 1952, 1953, 1954, 1955)
- US Open: W (1951, 1952, 1953, 1954, 1955)

Doris Hart (June 20, 1925 – May 29, 2015) was an American tennis player who was active in the 1940s and first half of the 1950s. She was ranked world No. 1 in 1951. She was the fourth player, and second woman, to win a Career Grand Slam in singles. She was the first of only three players (all women) to complete the career "Boxed Set" of Grand Slam titles, which is winning at least one title in singles, doubles, and mixed doubles at all four Grand Slam events. Only she and Margaret Court achieved this during the amateur era of the sport.

Hart played collegiate tennis for the Miami Hurricanes at the University of Miami in Coral Gables, Florida.

== Tennis career ==
Hart reached 67 Grand Slam finals and won 35 titles, tying with Louise Brough for sixth on the all-time list (behind Margaret Smith Court (64), Martina Navratilova (59), Billie Jean King (39), Serena Williams (39), and Margaret Osborne duPont (37)). Six of her titles were in women's singles, 14 in women's doubles, and 15 in mixed doubles. Hart is one of only three players, all women, to have a "boxed set" of Grand Slam titles — every possible title (singles, women's doubles, and mixed doubles) from all four Grand Slam tournaments. The others are Margaret Smith Court and Martina Navratilova. Hart was the first person to accomplish this feat.

As a child, Hart suffered from osteomyelitis, which resulted in a permanently impaired right leg. She started playing tennis when she was 10 years old, greatly encouraged by her brother Bud.

After losing seven Grand Slam finals from 1942 through 1946, Hart won her first Grand Slam title at the 1947 Wimbledon Championships in women's doubles. At that point, she was still a student at the University of Miami.

Her first Grand Slam singles title came at the 1949 Australian National Championships, where she was the only non-Australian player in the draw. She also won singles titles at the 1950 and 1952 French International Championships, the 1951 Wimbledon Championships (routing doubles partner Shirley Fry in the final), and the 1954 and 1955 U.S. National Championships. The 1955 U.S. singles final was the last Grand Slam singles match of her career.

Hart won the singles, women's doubles, and mixed doubles titles at the 1951 Wimbledon Championships, playing the finals of all three events on the same day (July 7, 1951). She also won the "triple crown" at the 1952 French International Championships and the 1954 U.S. National Championships.

During her Wightman Cup career from 1946 through 1955, Hart was a perfect 14–0 in singles matches and 8–1 in doubles matches.

Hart did not lose a Grand Slam women's doubles match from the 1951 French International Championships through the semifinals of the 1954 Wimbledon Championships, 43 matches in total, although she skipped 4 Grand Slam tournaments during this period. She also did not lose a mixed doubles match at the 13 Grand Slam tournaments she played from the 1951 French International Championships through the 1955 U.S. National Championships. She (and partner Stan Smith) lost in the third round of the 1968 Wimbledon Championships to Frew McMillan and Annette Van Zyl Du Plooy 6–3, 12–10.

According to John Olliff and Lance Tingay of The Daily Telegraph and the Daily Mail, Hart was ranked in the world top 10 from 1946 through 1955 (no rankings issued from 1940 through 1945), reaching a career high of world No. 1 in those rankings in 1951. Hart was included in the year-end top 10 rankings issued by the United States Lawn Tennis Association from 1942 through 1955. She was the top ranked U.S. player in 1954 and 1955.

Hart retired from the tour in late 1955 to become a tennis teaching professional. Her autobiography Tennis with Hart was published that year. Following her retirement, that same year she joined the United States Professional Tennis Association (USPTA), now Racquet Sports Professionals Association (RSPA). With USPTA she become certified as a tennis teaching professional and in 2012 was the first women inducted into USPTA's Hall of fame.

She was inducted into the inaugural Class of 1967 inductees to the University of Miami Sports Hall of Fame and inducted into the International Tennis Hall of Fame in 1969.

She died on May 29, 2015, at her home in Coral Gables, Florida, at age 89.

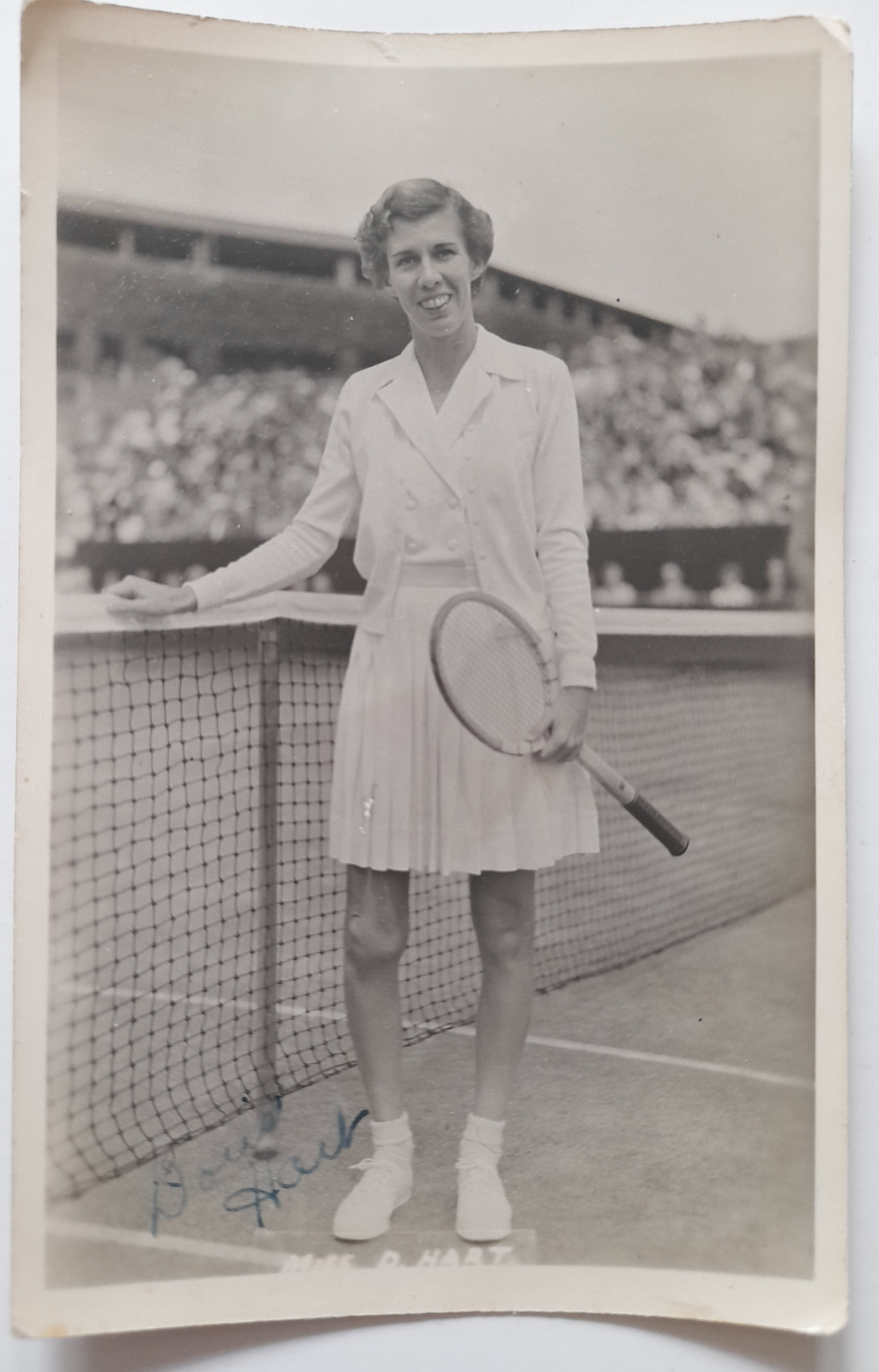
Signed Doris Hart publicity photograph acquired in London in 1951

== Grand Slam finals ==
=== Singles (6 titles, 12 runners-up) ===
Result	Year	Championship	Surface	Opponent	Score
Loss	1946	U.S. National Championships	Grass	(United States) Pauline Betz	9–11, 3–6
Loss	1947	Wimbledon	Grass	(United States) Margaret Osborne duPont	2–6, 4–6
Loss	1947	French Championships	Clay	(United States) Patricia Canning Todd	3–6, 6–3, 4–6
Loss	1948	Wimbledon	Grass	(United States) Louise Brough	3–6, 6–8
Win	1949	Australian Championships	Grass	(Australia) Nancye Wynne Bolton	6–3, 6–4
Loss	1949	U.S. National Championships	Grass	(United States) Margaret Osborne duPont	3–6, 1–6
Loss	1950	Australian Championships	Grass	(United States) Louise Brough	4–6, 6–3, 4–6
Win	1950	French Championships	Clay	(United States) Patricia Canning Todd	6–4, 4–6, 6–2
Loss	1950	U.S. National Championships	Grass	(United States) Margaret Osborne duPont	4–6, 3–6
Loss	1951	French Championships	Clay	(United States) Shirley Fry	3–6, 6–3, 3–6
Win	1951	Wimbledon	Grass	(United States) Shirley Fry	6–1, 6–0
Win	1952	French Championships	Clay	(United States) Shirley Fry	6–4, 6–4
Loss	1952	U.S. National Championships	Grass	(United States) Maureen Connolly	3–6, 5–7
Loss	1953	French Championships	Clay	(United States) Maureen Connolly	2–6, 4–6
Loss	1953	Wimbledon	Grass	(United States) Maureen Connolly	6–8, 5–7
Loss	1953	U.S. National Championships	Grass	(United States) Maureen Connolly	2–6, 4–6
Win	1954	U.S. National Championships	Grass	(United States) Louise Brough	6–8, 6–1, 8–6
Win	1955	U.S. National Championships	Grass	(United Kingdom) Patricia Ward	6–4, 6–2

=== Doubles (14 titles, 16 runners-up) ===
Result	Year	Championship	Surface	Partner	Opponents	Score
Loss	1942	U.S. National Championships	Grass	(United States) Pauline Betz	(United States) Louise Brough (United States) Margaret Osborne duPont	6–2, 5–7, 0–6
Loss	1943	U.S. National Championships	Grass	(United States) Pauline Betz	(United States) Louise Brough (United States) Margaret Osborne duPont	4–6, 3–6
Loss	1944	U.S. National Championships	Grass	(United States) Pauline Betz	(United States) Louise Brough (United States) Margaret Osborne duPont	6–4, 4–6, 3–6
Loss	1945	U.S. National Championships	Grass	(United States) Pauline Betz	(United States) Louise Brough (United States) Margaret Osborne duPont	3–6, 3–6
Loss	1946	Wimbledon	Grass	(United States) Pauline Betz	(United States) Louise Brough (United States) Margaret Osborne duPont	3–6, 6–2, 3–6
Loss	1946	French Championships	Clay	(United States) Pauline Betz	(United States) Louise Brough (United States) Margaret Osborne duPont	4–6, 6–0, 1–6
Win	1947	Wimbledon	Grass	(United States) Patricia Canning Todd	(United States) Louise Brough (United States) Margaret Osborne duPont	3–6, 6–4, 7–5
Loss	1947	French Championships	Clay	(United States) Patricia Canning Todd	(United States) Louise Brough (United States) Margaret Osborne duPont	5–7, 2–6
Loss	1947	U.S. National Championships	Grass	(United States) Patricia Canning Todd	(United States) Louise Brough (United States) Margaret Osborne duPont	7–5, 3–6, 5–7
Win	1948	French Championships	Clay	(United States) Patricia Canning Todd	(United States) Mary Arnold Prentiss (United States) Shirley Fry	6–4, 6–2
Loss	1948	Wimbledon	Grass	(United States) Patricia Canning Todd	(United States) Louise Brough (United States) Margaret Osborne duPont	1–6, 1–6
Loss	1948	U.S. National Championships	Grass	(United States) Patricia Canning Todd	(United States) Louise Brough (United States) Margaret Osborne duPont	4–6, 10–8, 1–6
Loss	1949	Australian Championships	Grass	(Australia) Marie Toomey	(Australia) Nancye Wynne Bolton (Australia) Thelma Coyne Long	0–6, 1–6
Loss	1949	U.S. National Championships	Grass	(United States) Shirley Fry	(United States) Louise Brough (United States) Margaret Osborne duPont	4–6, 8–10
Win	1950	Australian Championships	Grass	(United States) Louise Brough	(Australia) Nancye Wynne Bolton (Australia) Thelma Coyne Long	6–3, 2–6, 6–3
Win	1950	French Championships	Clay	(United States) Shirley Fry	(United States) Louise Brough (United States) Margaret Osborne duPont	1–6, 7–5, 6–2
Loss	1950	Wimbledon	Grass	(United States) Shirley Fry	(United States) Louise Brough (United States) Margaret Osborne duPont	4–6, 7–5, 1–6
Loss	1950	U.S. National Championships	Grass	(United States) Shirley Fry	(United States) Louise Brough (United States) Margaret Osborne duPont	2–6, 3–6
Win	1951	French Championships	Clay	(United States) Shirley Fry	(South Africa) Beryl Bartlett (United States) Barbara Scofield	10–8, 6–3
Win	1951	Wimbledon	Grass	(United States) Shirley Fry	(United States) Louise Brough (United States) Margaret Osborne duPont	6–2, 13–11
Win	1951	U.S. National Championships	Grass	(United States) Shirley Fry	(United States) Nancy Chaffee (United States) Patricia Canning Todd	6–4, 6–2
Win	1952	French Championships	Clay	(United States) Shirley Fry	(South Africa) Hazel Redick-Smith (South Africa) Julia Wipplinger	7–5, 6–1
Win	1952	Wimbledon	Grass	(United States) Shirley Fry	(United States) Louise Brough (United States) Maureen Connolly	8–6, 6–3
Win	1952	U.S. National Championships	Grass	(United States) Shirley Fry	(United States) Louise Brough (United States) Maureen Connolly	10–8, 6–4
Win	1953	French Championships	Clay	(United States) Shirley Fry	(United States) Maureen Connolly (United States) Julia Sampson	6–4, 6–3
Win	1953	Wimbledon	Grass	(United States) Shirley Fry	(United States) Maureen Connolly (United States) Julia Sampson	6–0, 6–0
Win	1953	U.S. National Championships	Grass	(United States) Shirley Fry	(United States) Louise Brough (United States) Margaret Osborne duPont	6–2, 7–9, 9–7
Loss	1954	Wimbledon	Grass	(United States) Shirley Fry	(United States) Louise Brough (United States) Margaret Osborne duPont	6–4, 7–9, 1–6
Win	1954	U.S. National Championships	Grass	(United States) Shirley Fry	(United States) Louise Brough (United States) Margaret Osborne duPont	6–4, 6–4
Loss	1955	U.S. National Championships	Grass	(United States) Shirley Fry	(United States) Louise Brough (United States) Margaret Osborne duPont	3–6, 6–1, 3–6

=== Mixed doubles: 19 (15 titles, 4 runners-up) ===
Result	Year	Championship	Surface	Partner	Opponents	Score
Loss	1945	U.S. Championships	Grass	(United States) Bob Falkenburg	(United States) Margaret Osborne duPont (United States) Bill Talbert	4–6, 4–6
Loss	1948	French Championships	Clay	(Australia) Frank Sedgman	(United States) Pat Canning Todd (Czechoslovakia) Jaroslav Drobný	3–6, 6–3, 3–6
Loss	1948	Wimbledon	Grass	(Australia) Frank Sedgman	(United States) Louise Brough (Australia) John Bromwich	2–6, 6–3, 3–6
Win	1949	Australian Championships	Grass	(Australia) Frank Sedgman	(Australia) Joyce Fitch (Australia) John Bromwich	6–1, 5–7, 12–10
Win	1950	Australian Championships	Grass	(Australia) Frank Sedgman	(Australia) Joyce Fitch (South Africa) Eric Sturgess	8–6, 6–4
Loss	1950	U.S. Championships	Grass	(Australia) Frank Sedgman	(United States) Margaret Osborne duPont (Australia) Ken McGregor	4–6, 6–3, 3–6
Win	1951	French Championships	Clay	(Australia) Frank Sedgman	(Australia) Thelma Coyne Long (Australia) Mervyn Rose	7–5, 6–2
Win	1951	Wimbledon	Grass	(Australia) Frank Sedgman	(Australia) Nancye Wynne Bolton (Australia) Mervyn Rose	7–5, 6–2
Win	1951	U.S. Championships	Grass	(Australia) Frank Sedgman	(United States) Shirley Fry (Australia) Mervyn Rose	6–3, 6–2
Win	1952	Wimbledon	Grass	(Australia) Frank Sedgman	(Australia) Thelma Coyne Long (Argentina) Enrique Morea	4–6, 6–3, 6–4
Win	1952	French Championships	Clay	(Australia) Frank Sedgman	(United States) Shirley Fry (South Africa) Eric Sturgess	6–8, 6–3, 6–3
Win	1952	U.S. Championships	Grass	(Australia) Frank Sedgman	(Australia) Thelma Long (Australia) Lew Hoad	6–3, 7–5
Win	1953	French Championships	Clay	(United States) Vic Seixas	(United States) Maureen Connolly (Australia) Mervyn Rose	4–6, 6–4, 6–0
Win	1953	Wimbledon	Grass	(United States) Vic Seixas	(United States) Shirley Fry (Argentina) Enrique Morea	9–7, 7–5
Win	1953	U.S. Championships	Grass	(United States) Vic Seixas	(United States) Julia Sampson (Australia) Rex Hartwig	6–2, 4–6, 6–4
Win	1954	Wimbledon	Grass	(United States) Vic Seixas	(United States) Margaret duPont (Australia) Ken Rosewall	5–7, 6–4, 6–3
Win	1955	Wimbledon	Grass	(United States) Vic Seixas	(United States) Louise Brough (Argentina) Enrique Morea	8–6, 2–6, 6–3
Win	1954	U.S. Championships	Grass	(United States) Vic Seixas	(United States) Margaret duPont (Australia) Ken Rosewall	4–6, 6–1, 6–1
Win	1955	U.S. Championships	Grass	(United States) Vic Seixas	(United States) Shirley Fry (Australia) Gardnar Mulloy	7–5, 5–7, 6–2

== Grand Slam performance timelines ==
Key
W	F	SF	QF	#R	RR	Q#	DNQ	A	NH

(W) winner; (F) finalist; (SF) semifinalist; (QF) quarterfinalist; (#R) rounds 4, 3, 2, 1; (RR) round-robin stage; (Q#) qualification round; (DNQ) did not qualify; (A) absent; (NH) not held; (SR) strike rate (events won / competed); (W–L) win–loss record.

=== Singles ===
Tournament	1940	1941	1942	1943	1944	1945	1946^{1}	1947^{1}	1948	1949	1950	1951	1952	1953	1954	1955	Career SR	Win–loss
Australian Championships	A	NH	NH	NH	NH	NH	A	A	A	W	F	A	A	A	A	A	1 / 2	8-1
French Championships	NH	R	R	R	R	A	QF	F	SF	A	W	F	W	F	A	A	2 / 7	28-5
Wimbledon Championships	NH	NH	NH	NH	NH	NH	QF	F	F	A	SF	W	QF	F	SF	SF	1 / 9	43-8
U.S. National Championships	2R^{2}	1R	QF	SF	QF	SF	F	SF	QF	F	F	SF	F	F	W	W	2 / 16	57-13
SR	0 / 1	0 / 1	0 / 1	0 / 1	0 / 1	0 / 1	0 / 3	0 / 3	0 / 3	1 / 2	1 / 4	1 / 3	1 / 3	0 / 3	1 / 2	1 / 2	6 / 34	
Win–loss	0-0	0-1	3-1	3-1	2-1	3-1	10-3	14-3	11-3	9-1	20-3	15-2	13-2	14-3	10-1	9-1		136-27

=== Doubles ===
Tournament	1942	1943	1944	1945	1946^{1}	1947^{1}	1948	1949	1950	1951	1952	1953	1954	1955	1956– 1967	1968	1969	Career SR
Australian Championships	NH	NH	NH	NH	A	A	A	F	W	A	A	A	A	A	A	A	A	1 / 2
French Championships	R	R	R	A	F	F	W	A	W	W	W	W	A	A	A	A	A	5 / 7
Wimbledon Championships	NH	NH	NH	NH	F	W	F	A	F	W	W	W	F	2R	A	2R	A	4 / 10
U.S. National Championships	F	F	F	F	SF	F	F	F	F	W	W	W	W	F	A	A	1R	4 / 15
SR	0 / 1	0 / 1	0 / 1	0 / 1	0 / 3	1 / 3	1 / 3	0 / 2	2 / 4	3 / 3	3 / 3	3 / 3	1 / 2	0 / 2	0 / 0	0 / 1	0 / 1	14 / 34

=== Mixed doubles ===
Tournament	1942	1943	1944	1945	1946^{1}	1947^{1}	1948	1949	1950	1951	1952	1953	1954	1955	1956–1967	1968	1969	Career SR
Australian Championships	NH	NH	NH	NH	A	A	A	W	W	A	A	A	A	A	A	A	A	2 / 2
French Championships	R	R	R	A	2R	A	F	A	3R	W	W	W	A	A	A	A	A	3 / 6
Wimbledon Championships	NH	NH	NH	NH	4R	SF	F	A	SF	W	W	W	W	W	A	3R	A	5 / 10
U.S. National Championships	2R	1R	QF	F	QF	1R	SF	QF	F	W	W	W	W	W	A	A	QF	5 / 15
SR	0 / 1	0 / 1	0 / 1	0 / 1	0 / 3	0 / 2	0 / 3	1 / 2	1 / 4	3 / 3	3 / 3	3 / 3	2 / 2	2 / 2	0 / 0	0 / 1	0 / 1	15 / 33

R = tournament restricted to French nationals and held under German occupation.
^{1}In 1946 and 1947, the French Championships were held after Wimbledon.
^{2}Hart did not play at this event. Her opponent got a walkover.

== See also ==
- Performance timelines for all female tennis players since 1978 who reached at least one Grand Slam final
