= Louise Brough =

American tennis player (1923–2014)

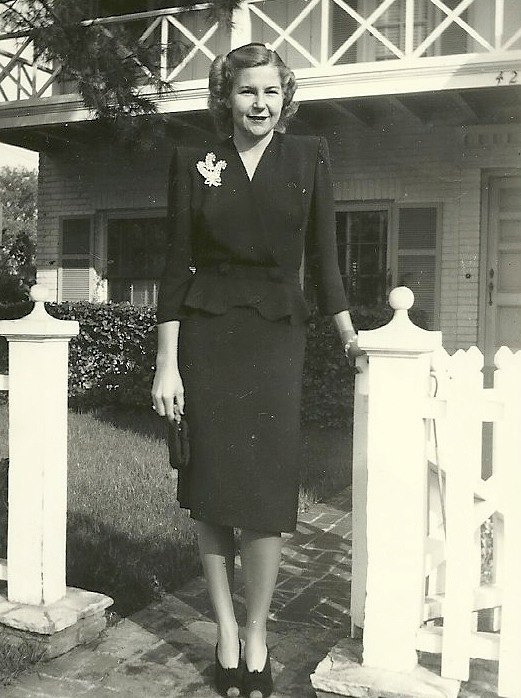
- Louise Brough in 1948
- Full name: Althea Louise Brough
- Country (sports): United States
- Born: March 11, 1923 Oklahoma City, Oklahoma, U.S.
- Died: February 3, 2014 (aged 90) Vista, California, U.S.
- Height: 1.71 m (5 ft 7 in)
- Retired: 1959
- Plays: Right-handed (one-handed backhand)
- Int. Tennis HoF: 1967 (member page) (member page)

Singles
- Career record: 614-134 (82.10%)
- Career titles: 59
- Highest ranking: No. 1 (1955, Lance Tingay)

Grand Slam singles results
- Australian Open: W (1950)
- French Open: SF (1946, 1947, 1950)
- Wimbledon: W (1948, 1949, 1950, 1955)
- US Open: W (1947)

Doubles
- Career record: 0–0
- Highest ranking: No. 1 (1946)

Grand Slam doubles results
- Australian Open: W (1950)
- French Open: W (1946, 1947, 1949)
- Wimbledon: W (1946, 1948, 1949, 1950, 1954)
- US Open: W (1942, 1943, 1944, 1945, 1946, 1947, 1948, 1949, 1950, 1955, 1956, 1957)

Grand Slam mixed doubles results
- Wimbledon: W (1946, 1947, 1948, 1950)
- US Open: W (1942, 1947, 1948, 1949)

Team competitions
- Wightman Cup: W (1946, 1947, 1948, 1950)

Althea Louise Brough Clapp (née Brough; March 11, 1923 – February 3, 2014) was an American tennis player. In her career between 1939 and 1959, she won six Grand Slam titles in singles as well as numerous doubles and mixed-doubles titles. At the end of the 1955 tennis season, Lance Tingay of the London Daily Telegraph ranked her world No. 1 for the year.

== Biography ==
Louise Brough was born in Oklahoma City, Oklahoma in 1923. Her family moved to Beverly Hills, California when she was four years old. She learned to play tennis on the public courts at Roxbury Park and was coached by Dick Skeen. In 1940 and 1941, she won the U.S. Girls' Championships.

In women's doubles, Brough never failed to reach the quarterfinals at the 32 Grand Slam tournaments she played during her career. She reached the semifinals 29 times and the final 28 times. She usually teamed with her longtime friend Margaret Osborne duPont. They won their first U.S. doubles title as a team at the 1942 U.S. National Championships. That was the first of nine consecutive doubles titles at the U.S. national tournament. This was the longest championship run in history in any event at any Grand Slam tournament. Their attempt at a tenth consecutive title was unsuccessful because Osborne duPont was injured and unable to play the 1951 U.S. Nationals. Osborne duPont also did not play there in 1952. In 1953, their winning streak as a team at the U.S. Nationals reached 42 before they lost to Doris Hart and Shirley Fry in the final, 6–2, 7–9, 9–7. Their career record as a team at the U.S. National Championships was 58–2, winning twelve of the 14 times they entered the tournament and losing only 12 sets in those 60 matches. They played Wimbledon as a team seven times, winning five titles and compiling a 33–2 record. At the French International Championships, they won three titles and had a 14–1 record. Combining their record at these three Grand Slam tournaments, they had a win–loss record of 105–5, 95.45 percent and won 20 titles out of 25 attempts.

In singles, Brough won the U.S. title in 1947 after being the runner-up in 1942 and 1943. Although she appeared in three more singles finals, this remained her only U.S. singles title. In 1948, she had a match point at 6–5 in the third set against duPont. She also had three match points in the 1954 final against Doris Hart, the first at 5–4 in the third set and two more at 6–5 in that set.

At Wimbledon, Brough won three consecutive singles titles from 1948 through 1950, with her fourth and last title coming in 1955. From 1946 through 1955, she appeared in seven Wimbledon singles finals. She also appeared in 21 of the 30 finals contested at Wimbledon in singles, women's doubles, and mixed doubles during those ten years. In 1946, she lifted a "double" at Wimbledon, winning the women's doubles title, and the mixed doubles title partnering Tom Brown. In 1948 and 1950, she won the rare "triple" at Wimbledon, sweeping the singles, women's doubles, and mixed doubles titles. During this stretch, in 1949, she lifted another "double" at Wimbledon, winning the singles and women's doubles titles. Alongside duPont, she won five doubles titles there. She also won 3 more mixed doubles titles there with partners John Bromwich and Eric Sturgess.

Brough entered the Australian National Championships only once, in 1950, when she won the singles and women's doubles titles. She played the French International Championships four times between 1946 and 1950, with her best result in singles being the semi-finals. The slow clay courts in Paris were not suitable to her attacking style of play. However, she won women's doubles titles there in 1946, 1947, and 1949.

Brough came very close in 1950 to winning a calendar year Grand Slam in women's doubles. She won the title at the Australian Championships with Doris Hart, and she won the titles at Wimbledon and the U.S. Championships, both with Osborne duPont. At the French International Championships, Brough and Osborne duPont reached the final and were heavy favorites to defeat Hart and Shirley Fry, but the latter team prevailed, 1–6, 7–5, 6–2. This was Brough's first defeat in a Grand Slam women's doubles match since the 1947 Wimbledon final.

In summary, Brough won 17 titles at the U.S. National Championships, 13 titles at Wimbledon, three titles at the French International Championships, and two titles at the Australian National Championships. Her 35 Grand Slam titles ties her with Doris Hart for fifth on the all-time list, behind only Margaret Smith Court, Martina Navratilova, Billie Jean King, and Margaret Osborne duPont.

According to John Olliff and Lance Tingay of the London Daily Telegraph and the Daily Mail, Brough was ranked in the world top 10 from 1946 through 1957 (no rankings issued from 1940 through 1945), reaching a career high of world No. 1 in 1955. She was included in the year-end top 10 rankings issued by the United States Lawn Tennis Association (USLTA) from 1941 through 1950 and from 1952 through 1957. She was the top ranked US player in 1947. Her 16 years in the USLTA top 10 put her behind only Billie Jean King (18 years) and Chris Evert (19 years).

Bud Collins regarded her as one of the great volleyers in history. He wrote "A willowy blonde, 5-foot-7 1/2, she was quiet but the killer in the left court when at play alongside duPont." Beside her aggressive volleys, her strengths were her backhand and a paralyzing American twist serve with a high kick. Alice Marble wrote about Brough's serve "She gets an enormously high bounce on this serve, and women are notoriously feeble in their effort to return it, especially on the backhand."

Brough married dentist Dr. Alan Clapp on August 9, 1958. She taught juniors in California for the following 20 years. She was inducted in the International Tennis Hall of Fame in 1967. Occasionally she played in local tournaments in California and in senior tournaments, winning the doubles title at the U.S. Hard Court Senior Championships alongside Barbara Green Weigandt in 1971 and 1975. Her husband died in 1999. She died at her home in Vista, California, on February 3, 2014, at the age of 90 and left no children. She left one of her Wimbledon trophies to her alma mater, Beverly Hills High School.

== Grand Slam finals ==
=== Singles: 14 (6 titles, 8 runner-ups) ===
Result	Year	Championship	Surface	Opponent	Score
Loss	1942	U.S. Championships	Grass	(United States) Pauline Betz	6–4, 1–6, 4–6
Loss	1943	U.S. Championships	Grass	(United States) Pauline Betz	3–6, 7–5, 3–6
Loss	1946	Wimbledon	Grass	(United States) Pauline Betz	2–6, 4–6
Win	1947	U.S. Championships	Grass	(United States) Margaret Osborne duPont	8–6, 4–6, 6–1
Win	1948	Wimbledon	Grass	(United States) Doris Hart	6–3, 8–6
Loss	1948	U.S. Championships	Grass	(United States) Margaret Osborne duPont	6–4, 4–6, 13–15
Win	1949	Wimbledon (2)	Grass	(United States) Margaret Osborne duPont	10–8, 1–6, 10–8
Win	1950	Australian Championships	Grass	(United States) Doris Hart	6–4, 3–6, 6–4
Win	1950	Wimbledon (3)	Grass	(United States) Margaret Osborne duPont	6–1, 3–6, 6–1
Loss	1952	Wimbledon	Grass	(United States) Maureen Connolly	5–7, 3–6
Loss	1954	Wimbledon	Grass	(United States) Maureen Connolly	2–6, 5–7
Loss	1954	U.S. Championships	Grass	(United States) Doris Hart	8–6, 1–6, 6–8
Win	1955	Wimbledon (4)	Grass	(United States) Beverly Baker Fleitz	7–5, 8–6
Loss	1957	U.S. Championships	Grass	(United States) Althea Gibson	3–6, 2–6

=== Doubles: 28 (21 titles, 7 runner-ups) ===
Result	Year	Championship	Surface	Partner	Opponents	Score
Win	1942	U.S. Championships	Grass	(United States) Margaret Osborne duPont	(United States) Pauline Betz (United States) Doris Hart	2–6, 7–5, 6–0
Win	1943	U.S. Championships (2)	Grass	(United States) Margaret Osborne duPont	(United States) Pauline Betz (United States) Doris Hart	6–4, 6–3
Win	1944	U.S. Championships (3)	Grass	(United States) Margaret Osborne duPont	(United States) Pauline Betz (United States) Doris Hart	4–6, 6–4, 6–3
Win	1945	U.S. Championships (4)	Grass	(United States) Margaret Osborne duPont	(United States) Pauline Betz (United States) Doris Hart	6–3, 6–3
Win	1946	Wimbledon	Grass	(United States) Margaret Osborne duPont	(United States) Pauline Betz (United States) Doris Hart	6–3, 2–6, 6–3
Win	1946	French Championships	Clay	(United States) Margaret Osborne duPont	(United States) Pauline Betz (United States) Doris Hart	6–4, 0–6, 6–1
Win	1946	U.S. Championships (5)	Grass	(United States) Margaret Osborne duPont	(United States) Patricia Canning Todd (United States) Mary Arnold Prentiss	6–1, 6–3
Loss	1947	Wimbledon	Grass	(United States) Margaret Osborne duPont	(United States) Doris Hart (United States) Patricia Canning Todd	6–3, 4–6, 5–7
Win	1947	French Championships (2)	Clay	(United States) Margaret Osborne duPont	(United States) Pauline Betz (United States) Patricia Canning Todd	7–5, 6–2
Win	1947	U.S. Championships (6)	Grass	(United States) Margaret Osborne duPont	(United States) Patricia Canning Todd (United States) Doris Hart	5–7, 6–3, 7–5
Win	1948	Wimbledon (2)	Grass	(United States) Margaret Osborne duPont	(United States) Doris Hart (United States) Patricia Canning Todd	6–3, 3–6, 6–3
Win	1948	U.S. Championships (7)	Grass	(United States) Margaret Osborne duPont	(United States) Patricia Canning Todd (United States) Doris Hart	6–4, 8–10, 6–1
Win	1949	French Championships (3)	Clay	(United States) Margaret Osborne duPont	(United Kingdom) Joy Gannon (United Kingdom) Betty Hilton	7–5, 6–1
Win	1949	Wimbledon (3)	Grass	(United States) Margaret Osborne duPont	(United States) Gussy Moran (United States) Patricia Canning Todd	8–6, 7–5
Win	1949	U.S. Championships (8)	Grass	(United States) Margaret Osborne duPont	(United States) Doris Hart (United States) Shirley Fry	6–4, 10–8
Win	1950	Australian Championships	Grass	(United States) Doris Hart	(Australia) Nancye Wynne Bolton (Australia) Thelma Coyne Long	6–2, 2–6, 6–3
Loss	1950	French Championships	Clay	(United States) Margaret Osborne duPont	(United States) Doris Hart (United States) Shirley Fry	6–1, 5–7, 2–6
Win	1950	Wimbledon (4)	Grass	(United States) Margaret Osborne duPont	(United States) Shirley Fry (United States) Doris Hart	6–4, 5–7, 6–1
Win	1950	U.S. Championships (9)	Grass	(United States) Margaret Osborne duPont	(United States) Doris Hart (United States) Shirley Fry	6–2, 6–3
Loss	1951	Wimbledon	Grass	(United States) Margaret Osborne duPont	(United States) Shirley Fry (United States) Doris Hart	3–6, 11–13
Loss	1952	Wimbledon	Grass	(United States) Maureen Connolly	(United States) Shirley Fry (United States) Doris Hart	6–8, 3–6
Loss	1952	U.S. Championships	Grass	(United States) Maureen Connolly	(United States) Doris Hart (United States) Shirley Fry	8–10, 4–6
Loss	1953	U.S. Championships	Grass	(United States) Margaret Osborne duPont	(United States) Doris Hart (United States) Shirley Fry	2–6, 9–7, 7–9
Win	1954	Wimbledon (5)	Grass	(United States) Margaret Osborne duPont	(United States) Shirley Fry (United States) Doris Hart	4–6, 9–7, 6–3
Loss	1954	U.S. Championships	Grass	(United States) Margaret Osborne duPont	(United States) Doris Hart (United States) Shirley Fry	4–6, 4–6
Win	1955	U.S. Championships (10)	Grass	(United States) Margaret Osborne duPont	(United States) Doris Hart (United States) Shirley Fry	6–3, 1–6, 6–3
Win	1956	U.S. Championships (11)	Grass	(United States) Margaret Osborne duPont	(United States) Betty Rosenquest Pratt (United States) Shirley Fry	6–3, 6–0
Win	1957	U.S. Championships (12)	Grass	(United States) Margaret Osborne duPont	(United States) Althea Gibson (United States) Darlene Hard	6–2, 7–5

=== Mixed doubles: 11 (8 titles, 3 runner-ups) ===
Result	Year	Championship	Surface	Partner	Opponents	Score
Win	1942	U.S. Championships	Grass	(United States) Ted Schroeder	(United States) Patricia Todd (Argentina) Alejo Russell	3–6, 6–1, 6–4
Win	1946	Wimbledon	Grass	(United States) Tom Brown	(United States) Dorothy Bundy (Australia) Geoff Brown	6–4, 6–4
Loss	1946	U.S. Championships	Grass	(United States) Robert Kimbrell	(United States) Margaret Osborne duPont (United States) Bill Talbert	3–6, 4–6
Win	1947	Wimbledon (2)	Grass	(Australia) John Bromwich	(Australia) Nancye Wynne Bolton (Australia) Colin Long	1–6, 6–4, 6–2
Win	1947	U.S. Championships (2)	Grass	(Australia) John Bromwich	(United States) Gussy Moran (United States) Pancho Segura	6–3, 6–1
Win	1948	Wimbledon (3)	Grass	(Australia) John Bromwich	(United States) Doris Hart (Australia) Frank Sedgman	6–2, 3–6, 6–3
Win	1948	U.S. Championships (3)	Grass	(United States) Tom Brown	(United States) Margaret Osborne duPont (United States) Bill Talbert	6–4, 6–4
Loss	1949	Wimbledon	Grass	(Australia) John Bromwich	(South Africa) Sheila Piercey Summers (South Africa) Eric Sturgess	7–9, 11–9, 5–7
Win	1949	U.S. Championships (4)	Grass	(South Africa) Eric Sturgess	(United States) Margaret Osborne duPont (United States) Bill Talbert	4–5, 6–3, 7–5
Win	1950	Wimbledon (4)	Grass	(South Africa) Eric Sturgess	(United States) Pat Canning Todd (Australia) Geoff Brown	11–9, 1–6, 6–4
Loss	1955	Wimbledon	Grass	(Argentina) Enrique Morea	(United States) Doris Hart (United States) Vic Seixas	6–8, 6–2, 3–6

== Grand Slam performance timelines ==
Key
W	F	SF	QF	#R	RR	Q#	DNQ	A	NH

(W) winner; (F) finalist; (SF) semifinalist; (QF) quarterfinalist; (#R) rounds 4, 3, 2, 1; (RR) round-robin stage; (Q#) qualification round; (DNQ) did not qualify; (A) absent; (NH) not held; (SR) strike rate (events won / competed); (W–L) win–loss record.

=== Singles ===
Tournament	1939	1940	1941	1942	1943	1944	1945	1946^{1}	1947^{1}	1948	1949	1950	1951	1952	1953	1954	1955	1956	1957	1958	1959	Career SR	Career Win–loss
Australian Championships	A	A	NH	NH	NH	NH	NH	A	A	A	A	W	A	A	A	A	A	A	A	A	A	1 / 1	5–0
French Championships	A	NH	R	R	R	R	A	SF	SF	A	3R	SF	A	A	A	A	A	A	A	A	A	0 / 4	10–4
Wimbledon	A	NH	NH	NH	NH	NH	NH	F	SF	W	W	W	SF	F	A	F	W	SF	QF	A	A	4 / 11	56–7
US Championships	1R	1R	2R	F	F	SF	SF	QF	W	F	SF	3R	A	SF	SF	F	3R	QF	F	A	QF	1 / 19	60–18
SR	0 / 1	0 / 1	0 / 1	0 / 1	0 / 1	0 / 1	0 / 1	0 / 3	1 / 3	1 / 2	1 / 3	2 / 4	0 / 1	0 / 2	0 / 1	0 / 2	1 / 2	0 / 2	0 / 2	0 / 0	0 / 1	6 / 35	
Win–loss	0–1	0–1	1–1	5–1	4–1	3–1	3–1	11–3	13–2	11–1	10–2	16–2	4–1	10–2	3–1	11–2	8–1	7–2	8–2	0–0	3–1	Total:	131–29

=== Doubles ===
Tournament	1940	1941	1942	1943	1944	1945	1946^{1}	1947^{1}	1948	1949	1950	1951	1952	1953	1954	1955	1956	1957	1958	1959	Career SR	Win–loss
Australian Championships	A	A	NH	NH	NH	NH	NH	A	A	A	W	A	A	A	A	A	A	A	A	A	1 / 1	3–0
French Championships	NH	R	R	R	R	A	W	W	A	W	F	A	A	A	A	A	A	A	A	A	3 / 4	14–1
Wimbledon	NH	NH	NH	NH	NH	NH	W	F	W	W	W	F	F	A	W	A	SF	A	A	A	5 / 9	39–4
US Championships	QF	QF	W	W	W	W	W	W	W	W	W	A	F	F	F	W	W	W	A	QF	12 / 18	65–6
SR	0 / 1	0 / 1	1 / 1	1 / 1	1 / 1	1 / 1	3 / 3	2 / 3	2 / 2	3 / 3	3 / 4	0 / 1	0 / 2	0 / 1	1 / 2	1 / 1	1 / 2	1 / 1	0 / 0	0 / 1	21 / 32	
Win–loss	1–1	1–1	5–0	4–0	4–0	4–0	12–0	13–1	10–0	13–0	14–1	4–1	6–2	4–1	9–1	4–0	7–1	4–0	0–0	2–1	Total:	121–11

=== Mixed doubles ===
Tournament	1940	1941	1942	1943	1944	1945	1946	1947	1948	1949	1950	1951	1952	1953	1954	1955	1956	1957	Career SR
Australian Championships	NH	NH	NH	NH	NH	A	A	A	A	A	SF	A	A	A	A	A	A	A	0 / 1
French Championships	NH	R	R	R	R	A	A	A	A	A	A	A	A	A	A	A	A	A	0 / 0
Wimbledon	NH	NH	NH	NH	NH	NH	W	W	W	F	W	SF	SF	A	A	F	A	4R	4 / 9
US Championships	1R	QF	W	SF	A	SF	F	W	W	W	3R	A	A	QF	QF	A	A	A	4 / 12
SR	0 / 1	0 / 1	1 / 1	0 / 1	0 / 0	0 / 1	1 / 2	2 / 2	2 / 2	1 / 2	1 / 3	0 / 1	0 / 1	0 / 1	0 / 1	0 / 0	0 / 0	0 / 1	8 / 22

R = tournament restricted to French nationals and held under German occupation.

== See also ==
- Performance timelines for all female tennis players since 1978 who reached at least one Grand Slam final
