= 1954 Wimbledon Championships – Women's doubles =

Women's doubles
- 1954 Wimbledon Championships

Final
- Champions: (United States) Louise Brough (United States) Margaret duPont
- Runners-up: (United States) Shirley Fry (United States) Doris Hart
- Score: 4–6, 9–7, 6–3

Details
- Draw: 48 (5Q)
- Seeds: 4

Events
Singles	men	women		boys	girls
Doubles	men	women	mixed	boys	girls
- Wimbledon Championships

Louise Brough and Margaret duPont defeated the defending champions Shirley Fry and Doris Hart in the final, 4–6, 9–7, 6–3 to win the ladies' doubles tennis title at the 1954 Wimbledon Championships.

== Seeds ==
1. (United States) Shirley Fry / (United States) Doris Hart (final)
2. (United States) Louise Brough / (United States) Margaret duPont (champions)
3. (United Kingdom) Angela Mortimer / (United Kingdom) Anne Shilcock (semifinals)
4. (United States) Betty Pratt / (West Germany) Erika Vollmer (quarterfinals)

Click on the seed number of a player to go to their draw section.

== Draw ==
Key

- Q = Qualifier
- WC = Wild card
- LL = Lucky loser
- Alt = Alternate
- ITF = ITF entry
- PR = Protected ranking
- SR = Special ranking
- SE = Special exempt
- JE = Junior exempt
- JR = Junior Accelerator Programme entrant
- CO = College Accelerator Programme entrant
- NG = Next Gen Accelerator Program entrant
- w/o = Walkover
- r = Retired
- d = Defaulted

=== Finals ===
Quarterfinals
1	(United States) Shirley Fry (United States) Doris Hart	6	6
(New Zealand) Judy Burke (New Zealand) Heather Robson	2	3
3	(United Kingdom) Angela Mortimer (United Kingdom) Anne Shilcock	6	3	6
(United Kingdom) Angela Buxton (United Kingdom) Vera Thomas	2	6	2
(Bermuda) Heather Brewer (United States) Kay Hubbell	1	6	6
4	(United States) Betty Pratt (West Germany) Erika Vollmer	6	1	4
(Italy) Silvana Lazzarino (Italy) Nicla Migliori	0	2
2	(United States) Louise Brough (United States) Margaret duPont	6	6

Semifinals
1	(United States) Shirley Fry (United States) Doris Hart	6	6
3	(United Kingdom) Angela Mortimer (United Kingdom) Anne Shilcock	2	1
(Bermuda) Heather Brewer (United States) Kay Hubbell	1	1
2	(United States) Louise Brough (United States) Margaret duPont	6	6

Final
1	(United States) Shirley Fry (United States) Doris Hart	6	7	3
2	(United States) Louise Brough (United States) Margaret duPont	4	9	6

=== Top half ===
==== Section 1 ====
First round

Second round
1	(United States) Shirley Fry (United States) Doris Hart	6	6
Q	(United Kingdom) Nancy Liebert (United Kingdom) Chloe Rhodes	0	0
(United Kingdom) Hazel Cheadle (United Kingdom) Gem Hoahing	5	3
(United Kingdom) Jennifer Middleton (United Kingdom) Elaine Watson	7	6
(New Zealand) Judy Burke (New Zealand) Heather Robson	11	6
Q	(Japan) Sachiko Kamo (France) Annie Soisbault	9	3
(Austria) Elizabeth Broz (Switzerland) Ruth Kaufmann	2	4
(France) Ginette Bucaille (France) Jacqueline Kermina	6	6

Third round
1	(United States) S Fry (United States) D Hart	6	6
(United Kingdom) J Middleton (United Kingdom) E Watson	2	2
(New Zealand) J Burke (New Zealand) H Robson	1	7	6
(France) G Bucaille (France) J Kermina	6	5	4

Quarterfinals
1	(United States) S Fry (United States) D Hart	6	6
(New Zealand) J Burke (New Zealand) H Robson	2	3

==== Section 2 ====
First round
3	(United Kingdom) Angela Mortimer (United Kingdom) Anne Shilcock	6	6
(United Kingdom) Valerie Lewis (United Kingdom) Evelyn Moeller	4	4
(Egypt) Betsy Abbas (United Kingdom) Pat Ward	7	11
(United Kingdom) Freda Hammersley (Australia) Nell Hopman	5	9
(United Kingdom) Jenny Wagstaff (United Kingdom) Bobbie Wilson	4	2
(United Kingdom) Doreen Spiers (Spain) María Josefa de Riba	6	6
(United Kingdom) Gem Gilbert (United Kingdom) Sue Waters	6	0	7
(United Kingdom) Pat Gotla (United Kingdom) Barbara Knapp	4	6	5
(United Kingdom) Heather Macfarlane (United Kingdom) Molly Mackay	8	6	6
(South Africa) Audrey Bilse (South Africa) Joan Scott	6	8	2
(United Kingdom) SC Collett (United Kingdom) Mrs J Maltby	3	1
(Argentina) Edda Buding (Mexico) Melita Ramírez	6	6
(New Zealand) Evelyn Attwood (Canada) Hanna Sladek	6	6
(Austria) Helga Strecker (West Germany) Ingeborg Vogler	2	3
(United Kingdom) Rosemary Bulleid (United Kingdom) Georgie Woodgate	1	6	3
(United Kingdom) Angela Buxton (United Kingdom) Vera Thomas	6	4	6

Second round
3	(United Kingdom) A Mortimer (United Kingdom) A Shilcock	6	6
(Egypt) B Abbas (United Kingdom) P Ward	4	2
(United Kingdom) D Spiers (Spain) MJ de Riba	4	4
(United Kingdom) D Gilbert (United Kingdom) S Waters	6	6
(United Kingdom) H Macfarlane (United Kingdom) M Mackay	9	7
(Argentina) E Buding (Mexico) I Ramírez	7	5
(New Zealand) E Attwood (Canada) H Sladek	1	6	1
(United Kingdom) A Buxton (United Kingdom) V Thomas	6	3	6

Third round
3	(United Kingdom) A Mortimer (United Kingdom) A Shilcock	6	6
(United Kingdom) D Gilbert (United Kingdom) S Waters	2	1
(United Kingdom) H Macfarlane (United Kingdom) M Mackay	1	1
(United Kingdom) A Buxton (United Kingdom) V Thomas	6	6

Quarterfinals
3	(United Kingdom) A Mortimer (United Kingdom) A Shilcock	6	3	6
(United Kingdom) A Buxton (United Kingdom) V Thomas	2	6	2

=== Bottom half ===
==== Section 3 ====
First round
(United Kingdom) Ruth Illingworth (United Kingdom) Jean Petchell	6	4	3
(France) Nelly Adamson (France) Suzanne Schmitt	3	6	6
Q	(France) Béatrice de Chambure (France) Colette Monnot	4	3
(Bermuda) Heather Brewer (United States) Kay Hubbell	6	6
LL	(United Kingdom) Mollie Govett (United Kingdom) Yvonne Watkins	3	3
(United Kingdom) Margaret Grace (United Kingdom) Sheila Griffin	6	6
Q	(Australia) Kay Neville-Smith (Australia) Beth Ruffin	2	2
(United Kingdom) Peggy Dawson-Scott (United Kingdom) Bea Walter	6	6
(United Kingdom) Lorna Cawthorn (United Kingdom) Mary Harris	6	7
(Netherlands) Fenny ten Bosch (Netherlands) Jopie Roos-van der Wal	2	5
(United Kingdom) Elizabeth Ernest (United Kingdom) Enid Kerr	6	6
Q	(United Kingdom) Jean Knight (United Kingdom) Judy Wallace	2	2
(United Kingdom) Pat Hird (United Kingdom) Valerie Pitt	2	6	4
(United Kingdom) Rosemary Walsh (United Kingdom) Billie Woodgate	6	1	6
(United Kingdom) Mary Eyre (United Kingdom) Viola White	1	3
4	(United States) Betty Pratt (West Germany) Erika Vollmer	6	6

Second round
(France) N Adamson (France) S Schmitt	4	2
(Bermuda) H Brewer (United States) K Hubbell	6	6
(United Kingdom) M Grace (United Kingdom) S Griffin	2	4
(United Kingdom) P Dawson-Scott (United Kingdom) B Walter	6	6
(United Kingdom) L Cawthorn (United Kingdom) M Harris	6	4	6
(United Kingdom) E Ernest (United Kingdom) E Kerr	4	6	4
(United Kingdom) R Walsh (United Kingdom) R Woodgate	2	3
4	(United States) E Pratt (West Germany) E Vollmer	6	6

Third round
(Bermuda) H Brewer (United States) K Hubbell	6	8
(United Kingdom) P Dawson-Scott (United Kingdom) B Walter	4	6
(United Kingdom) L Cawthorn (United Kingdom) M Harris	2	4
4	(United States) E Pratt (West Germany) E Vollmer	6	6

Quarterfinals
(Bermuda) H Brewer (United States) K Hubbell	1	6	6
4	(United States) E Pratt (West Germany) E Vollmer	6	1	4

==== Section 4 ====
First round

Second round
(Switzerland) Violette Alvensleben-Rigollet (Argentina) Elena Lehmann	w/o
(United States) Dorothy Levine (Belgium) Christiane Mercelis
(United Kingdom) Patience Chapman (United Kingdom) Vivienne Uber	3	6
(Italy) Silvana Lazzarino (Italy) Nicla Migliori	6	8
(United Kingdom) Helen Fletcher (United Kingdom) Pat Harrison	6	15
(United States) Barbara Kimbrell (United States) Baba Lewis	3	13
(United States) Barbara Bradley (United States) Gloria Butler	0	0
2	(United States) Louise Brough (United States) Margaret duPont	6	6

Third round
(United States) D Levine (Belgium) C Mercelis	4	5
(Italy) S Lazzarino (Italy) N Migliori	6	7
(United Kingdom) H Fletcher (United Kingdom) P Harrison	3	4
2	(United States) L Brough (United States) M duPont	6	6

Quarterfinals
(Italy) S Lazzarino (Italy) N Migliori	0	2
2	(United States) L Brough (United States) M duPont	6	6
