= 1957 French Championships – Women's singles =

Women's singles
- 1957 French Championships

Final
- Champion: (United Kingdom) Shirley Bloomer
- Runner-up: (United States) Dorothy Knode
- Score: 6–1, 6–3

Details
- Draw: 64
- Seeds: 16

Events
Singles	men	women
Doubles	men	women
← 1956 ·	French Championships	· 1958 →

First-seeded Shirley Bloomer defeated Dorothy Knode 6–1, 6–3 in the final to win the women's singles tennis title at the 1957 French Championships.

== Seeds ==
The seeded players are listed below. Shirley Bloomer is the champion; others show the round in which they were eliminated.

1. (United Kingdom) Shirley Bloomer (champion)
2. (United States) Dorothy Knode (finalist)
3. (Belgium) Christiane Mercelis (quarterfinals)
4. (West Germany) Edda Buding (third round)
5. (United States) Darlene Hard (quarterfinals)
6. (Australia) Mary Hawton (third round)
7. (Italy) Silvana Lazzarino (second round)
8. (Italy) Annalissa Bellani (third round)
9. (Hungary) Zsuzsi Körmöczy (quarterfinals)
10. (Bermuda) Heather Brewer (quarterfinals)
11. (France) Jacqueline Kermina (second round)
12. (France) Ginette Bucaille (second round)
13. (Czechoslovakia) Vera Puzejova (semifinals)
14. (West Germany) Erika Vollmer (third round)
15. (Spain) Pilar Barril (third round)
16. (Mexico) Yola Ramírez (third round)

== Draw ==
=== Key ===
- Q = Qualifier
- WC = Wild card
- LL = Lucky loser
- r = Retired

=== Finals ===
Quarterfinals
1	(United Kingdom) Shirley Bloomer	6	6
9	(Hungary) Zsuzsi Körmöczy	1	1
13	(Czechoslovakia) Věra Pužejová	6	5	8
5	(United States) Darlene Hard	3	7	6
(United Kingdom) Ann Haydon	6	6
3	(Belgium) Christiane Mercelis	2	1
10	(Bermuda) Heather Brewer	1	7
2	(United States) Dorothy Knode	6	9

Semifinals
1	(United Kingdom) Shirley Bloomer	6	2	6
13	(Czechoslovakia) Věra Pužejová	4	6	4
(United Kingdom) Ann Haydon	4	8
2	(United States) Dorothy Knode	6	10

Finals
1	(United Kingdom) Shirley Bloomer	6	6
2	(United States) Dorothy Knode	1	3

=== Earlier rounds ===
==== Section 1 ====
First round
1	(United Kingdom) Bloomer	6	6
(Netherlands) Marinkelle	4	2
(France) Coste	6	7	0
(France) De La Courtie	3	9	6
(South Africa) Schuurman	2	4
16	(Mexico) Ramírez	6	6
(France) Seghers	6	6	5
(France) Nenot	8	0	7
(France) Dubois	1	3
8	(Italy) Bellani	6	6
(United States) Fageros
(Poland) Jędrzejowska
(France) Gimault	3	1
9	(Hungary) Körmöczy	6	6
(Italy) Migliori	w/o
(Australia) Hoad

Second round
1	(United Kingdom) Bloomer	6	6
(France) De La Courtie	2	1
16	(Mexico) Ramírez	6	6
(France) Nenot	1	3
8	(Italy) Bellani	6	6
(Poland) Jędrzejowska	2	2
9	(Hungary) Körmöczy	7	6
(Australia) Hoad	5	1

Third round
1	(United Kingdom) Bloomer	8	3	6
16	(Mexico) Ramírez	6	6	4
8	(Italy) Bellani	1	2
9	(Hungary) Körmöczy	6	6

Quarterfinals
1	(United Kingdom) Bloomer	6	6
9	(Hungary) Körmöczy	1	1

==== Section 2 ====
First round
(France) Bouchet	1	2
4	(West Germany) Buding	6	6
(Italy) Pericoli
(Canada) Bedard
(United Kingdom) Truman	5	0
13	(Czechoslovakia) Pužejová	7	6
(France) Chatrier	3	7	2
(South Africa) Reynolds	6	5	6
(Hungary) Mrs. Gy Erdődi
5	(United States) Hard
(France) Trauttmann	1	2
(United States) Liguori	6	6
(France) Monnot	1	2
12	(France) Bucaille	6	6
(France) Courteix	3	4
(Australia) Hellyer	6	6

Second round
4	(West Germany) Buding	6	6
(Canada) Bedard	0	1
13	(Czechoslovakia) Pužejová	8	6
(South Africa) Reynolds	6	1
5	(United States) Hard	6	6
(United States) Liguori	0	1
12	(France) Bucaille	6	4	1
(Australia) Hellyer	3	6	6

Third round
4	(West Germany) Buding	7	1	5
13	(Czechoslovakia) Pužejová	5	6	7
5	(United States) Hard	6	7
(Australia) Hellyer	3	5

Quarterfinals
13	(Czechoslovakia) Pužejová	6	5	8
5	(United States) Hard	3	7	6

==== Section 3 ====
First round
(Australia) Newcombe	w/o
(United Kingdom) Haydon
(New Zealand) Morrison	2	4
11	(France) Kermina	6	6
(France) De Chambure	4	4
(West Germany) Buding	6	6
(Netherlands) Wienese	3	3
6	(Australia) Hawton	6	6
(Argentina) Weiss	6	4	5
(France) Le Besnerais	4	6	7
(Mexico) Reyes	2	4
14	(West Germany) Vollmer	6	6
(Belgium) Pouchain	w/o
(France) De Lansalut
(France) Bourbonnais	3	6
3	(Belgium) Mercelis	6	8

Second round
(United Kingdom) Haydon	6	6
11	(France) Kermina	3	2
(West Germany) Buding	6	2	0
6	(Australia) Hawton	4	6	6
(France) Le Besnerais	6	4	4
14	(West Germany) Vollmer	3	6	6
(France) De Lansalut	2	5
3	(Belgium) Mercelis	6	7

Third round
(United Kingdom) Haydon	6	7
6	(Australia) Hawton	3	5
14	(West Germany) Vollmer	2	2
3	(Belgium) Mercelis	6	6

Quarterfinals
(United Kingdom) Haydon	6	6
3	(Belgium) Mercelis	2	1

==== Section 4 ====
First round
(Brazil) Bueno
(France) Galtier
(Kenya) Marshall
10	(Bermuda) Brewer
(France) Varin	6	4
(South Africa) Fancutt	8	6
(Belgium) Crowet	2	2
7	(Italy) Lazzarino	6	6
(New Zealand) Robson	1	2
(France) Billaz	6	6
(Hungary) Peterdy	4	7	5
15	(Spain) Barril	6	5	7
(France) Berson	4	3
(South Africa) Forbes	6	6
(France) Siarry	2	3
2	(United States) Knode	6	6

Second round
(France) Galtier	4	4
10	(Bermuda) Brewer	6	6
(South Africa) Fancutt	6	6
7	(Italy) Lazzarino	2	0
(France) Billaz	0	6	4
15	(Spain) Barril	6	2	6
(South Africa) Forbes	2	2
2	(United States) Knode	6	6

Third round
10	(Bermuda) Brewer	6	6
(South Africa) Fancutt	3	3
15	(Spain) Barril	0	0
2	(United States) Knode	6	6

Quarterfinals
10	(Bermuda) Brewer	1	7
2	(United States) Knode	6	9

Preceded by 1957 Australian Championships – Women's singles	Grand Slam women's singles	Succeeded by 1957 Wimbledon Championships – Women's singles
