= 1954 in tennis =

This page covers all the important events in the sport of tennis in 1954. It provides the results of notable tournaments throughout the year on both the men's and women's ILTF tennis circuits.

== Australian Open ==
Category	Champion(s)	Finalist(s)	Score
Men's singles	(Australia) Mervyn Rose	(Australia) Rex Hartwig	6–2, 0–6, 6–4, 6–2
Women's singles	(Australia) Thelma Coyne Long	(Australia) Jenny Staley	6–3, 6–4
Men's doubles	(Australia) Rex Hartwig (Australia) Mervyn Rose	(Australia) Neale Fraser (Australia) Clive Wilderspin	6–3, 6–4, 6–2
Women's doubles	(Australia) Mary Bevis Hawton (Australia) Beryl Penrose	(South Africa) Hazel Redick-Smith (South Africa) Julia Wipplinger	6–3, 8–6
Mixed doubles	(Australia) Thelma Coyne Long (Australia) Rex Hartwig	(Australia) Beryl Penrose (Australia) John Bromwich	4–6, 6–1, 6–2
Boys' singles	(United Kingdom) Billy Knight	(Australia) Roy Emerson	6–3, 6–1

== French Open ==
Category	Champion(s)	Finalist(s)	Score
Men's singles	(United States) Tony Trabert	(United States) Art Larsen	6–4, 7–5, 6–1
Women's singles	(United States) Maureen Connolly	(France) Ginette Bucaille	6–4, 6–1
Men's doubles	(United States) Vic Seixas (United States) Tony Trabert	(Australia) Lew Hoad (Australia) Ken Rosewall	6–4, 6–2, 6–1
Women's doubles	(United States) Maureen Connolly (Australia) Nell Hall Hopman	(France) Maud Galtier (France) Suzanne Schmitt	7–5, 4–6, 6–0
Mixed doubles	(United States) Maureen Connolly (Australia) Lew Hoad	(France) Jacqueline Patorni (Australia) Rex Hartwig	6–4, 6–3

== Wimbledon ==
Category	Champion(s)	Finalist(s)	Score
Men's singles	(Egypt) Jaroslav Drobný	(Australia) Ken Rosewall	13–11, 4–6, 6–2, 9–7
Women's singles	(United States) Maureen Connolly	(United States) Louise Brough	6–2, 7–5
Men's doubles	(Australia) Rex Hartwig (Australia) Mervyn Rose	(United States) Vic Seixas (United States) Tony Trabert	6–4, 6–4, 3–6, 6–4
Women's doubles	(United States) Louise Brough (United States) Margaret duPont	(United States) Shirley Fry (United States) Doris Hart	4–6, 9–7, 6–3
Mixed doubles	(United States) Vic Seixas (United States) Doris Hart	(Australia) Ken Rosewall (United States) Margaret duPont	5–7, 6–4, 6–3

== US Open ==
Category	Champion(s)	Finalist(s)	Score
Men's singles	(United States) Vic Seixas	(Australia) Rex Hartwig	3–6, 6–2, 6–4, 6–4
Women's singles	(United States) Doris Hart	(United States) Louise Brough	6–8, 6–1, 8–6
Men's doubles	(United States) Vic Seixas (United States) Tony Trabert	(Australia) Lew Hoad (Australia) Ken Rosewall	3–6, 6–4, 8–6, 6–3
Women's doubles	(United States) Shirley Fry (United States) Doris Hart	(United States) Louise Brough (United States) Margaret Osborne duPont	6–4, 6–4
Mixed doubles	(United States) Doris Hart (United States) Vic Seixas	(United States) Margaret Osborne duPont (Australia) Ken Rosewall	4–6, 6–1, 6–1
