= 1964 French Championships – Women's singles =

Women's singles
- 1964 French Championships

Final
- Champion: (Australia) Margaret Smith
- Runner-up: (Brazil) Maria Bueno
- Score: 5–7, 6–1, 6–2

Details
- Seeds: 16

Events
Singles	men	women
Doubles	men	women
← 1963 ·	French Championships	· 1965 →

First-seeded Margaret Smith defeated Maria Bueno 5–7, 6–1, 6–2 in the final to win the women's singles tennis title at the 1964 French Championships.

== Seeds ==
The seeded players are listed below. Margaret Smith is the champion; others show the round in which they were eliminated.

1. (Australia) Margaret Smith (champion)
2. (Brazil) Maria Bueno (finalist)
3. (Australia) Lesley Turner (semifinals)
4. (United States) Nancy Richey (fourth round)
5. (Australia) Jan Lehane (quarterfinals)
6. (United Kingdom) Christine Truman (quarterfinals)
7. (France) Françoise Dürr (second round)
8. (Czechoslovakia) Věra Suková (quarterfinals)
9. (United Kingdom) Deidre Catt (fourth round)
10. (South Africa) Annette Van Zyl (fourth round)
11. (Australia) Robyn Ebbern (fourth round)
12. (United Kingdom) Liz Starkie (third round)
13. (West Germany) Helga Schultze (semifinals)
14. (Australia) Madonna Schacht (fourth round)
15. (Australia) Judy Tegart (fourth round)
16. (Italy) Lea Pericoli (fourth round)

== Draw ==
=== Key ===
- Q = Qualifier
- WC = Wild card
- LL = Lucky loser
- r = Retired

=== Finals ===
Quarterfinals
1	(Australia) Margaret Smith	6	6
8	(Czechoslovakia) Věra Suková	1	1
13	(West Germany) Helga Schultze	2	7	6
5	(Australia) Jan Lehane	6	5	3
6	(United Kingdom) Christine Truman	1	3
3	(Australia) Lesley Turner	6	6
(United States) Karen Susman	4	0
2	(Brazil) Maria Bueno	6	6

Semifinals
1	(Australia) Margaret Smith	6	4	6
13	(West Germany) Helga Schultze	3	6	2
3	(Australia) Lesley Turner	6	2	0
2	(Brazil) Maria Bueno	3	6	6

Finals
1	(Australia) Margaret Smith	5	6	6
2	(Brazil) Maria Bueno	7	1	2

=== Earlier rounds ===
==== Section 1 ====
First round

Second round
1	(Australia) Smith
(United States) Morris
(West Germany) Schultze	3	3
(Italy) Lazzarino	6	6
(Czechoslovakia) Slattery	1	2
16	(Italy) Pericoli	6	6
(Spain) Estalella
(France) Boulle

Third round
1	(Australia) Smith	6	6
(Italy) Lazzarino	2	2
16	(Italy) Pericoli	6	8
(France) Boulle	3	6

Fourth round
1	(Australia) Smith	7	6
16	(Italy) Pericoli	5	1

==== Section 2 ====
First round

Second round
8	(Czechoslovakia) Suková	6	6
(France) Rouire	0	1
(Argentina) Bocio
(France) Nenot
9	(United Kingdom) Catt	6	2	6
(United States) Alvarez	3	6	3
(France) Mizen	0	4
(Australia) Plaisted	6	6

Third round
8	(Czechoslovakia) Suková	6	7
(France) Nenot	2	5
9	(United Kingdom) Catt	6	6
(Australia) Plaisted	2	3

Fourth round
8	(Czechoslovakia) Suková	6	1	6
9	(United Kingdom) Catt	1	6	0

==== Section 3 ====
First round
(United Kingdom) Rosser	5	4
(France) De Lansalut	7	6
(France) Dusapt	3	1
13	(West Germany) Schultze	6	6

Second round
4	(United States) Richey	6	6
(New Zealand) Anne Smith	2	0
(France) Lombard
(Italy) Beltrame
(France) Lieffrig	3	9	6
(Australia) McClenaughan	6	7	3
(France) De Lansalut	5	1
13	(West Germany) Schultze	7	6

Third round
4	(United States) Richey	6	6
(Italy) Beltrame	1	3
(France) Lieffrig	6	1
13	(West Germany) Schultze	8	6

Fourth round
4	(United States) Richey	6	3	3
13	(West Germany) Schultze	1	6	6

==== Section 4 ====
First round
5	(Australia) Lehane	6	6
(United States) Habicht	1	2
(Venezuela) Savy	2	0
(West Germany) Niessen	6	6
(France) Repoux	4	3
(Czechoslovakia) Kodešová	6	6
(France) Langanay	0	1
(Hungary) Körmöczy	6	6
(Argentina) Baylon	6	6
(West Germany) Schildknecht	0	0
(France) Nay	2	2
(Australia) Lesh	6	6
(Sweden) Löfdahl
12	(United Kingdom) Starkie
(Spain) Pombo De Peredo
(France) Terras

Second round
5	(Australia) Lehane	6	6
(West Germany) Niessen	0	2
(Czechoslovakia) Kodešová	6	8	0
(Hungary) Körmöczy	1	10	6
(Argentina) Baylon	6	6
(Australia) Lesh	3	2
12	(United Kingdom) Starkie	6	6
(France) Terras	0	2

Third round
5	(Australia) Lehane	7	6
(Hungary) Körmöczy	5	3
(Argentina) Baylon	4	6	6
12	(United Kingdom) Starkie	6	4	2

Fourth round
5	(Australia) Lehane	6	6
(Argentina) Baylon	2	3

==== Section 5 ====
First round
(United Kingdom) Truman	2	2
(United States) Fretz	6	6
(France) Kermina	3	2
(Belgium) Mercelis	6	6
(Norway) Paldan	0	2
(West Germany) Sturm	6	6
(France) Galtier
11	(Australia) Ebbern
(Mexico) Subirats	6	3	6
(United States) McLean	1	6	8
(South Africa) Waltermeyer	1	3
(France) Rees-Lewis	6	6
(Spain) Barril
(France) Vissault
(France) Berson	0	0
6	(United Kingdom) Truman	6	6

Second round
(United States) Fretz	1	5
(Belgium) Mercelis	6	7
(West Germany) Sturm	3	2
11	(Australia) Ebbern	6	6
(United States) McLean	0	0
(France) Rees-Lewis	6	6
(France) Vissault	2	1
6	(United Kingdom) Truman	6	6

Third round
(Belgium) Mercelis	4	4
11	(Australia) Ebbern	6	6
(France) Rees-Lewis	2	3
6	(United Kingdom) Truman	6	6

Fourth round
11	(Australia) Ebbern	2	0
6	(United Kingdom) Truman	6	6

==== Section 6 ====
First round
(France) Bouteleux	6	1	2
(Italy) Gordigiani	3	6	6
(South Africa) Segal
14	(Australia) Schacht
(France) Le Besnerais	7	5	4
(Spain) Coronado	5	7	6

Second round
(Italy) Gordigiani	6	3	1
14	(Australia) Schacht	4	6	6
(Spain) Coronado	5	6	7
(France) Salfati	7	4	5
(United States) Crosby	4	2
(France) Galtier	6	6
(South Africa) Walkden
3	(Australia) Turner

Third round
14	(Australia) Schacht	6	6
(Spain) Coronado	2	2
(France) Galtier	1	2
3	(Australia) Turner	6	6

Fourth round
14	(Australia) Schacht	4	4
3	(Australia) Turner	6	6

==== Section 7 ====
First round

Second round
(United States) Crosby	4	2
(United Kingdom) Holdsworth	6	6
(United States) Stock	2	1
10	(South Africa) Van Zyl	6	6
(France) Venturino	0	4
(United States) Susman	6	6
7	(France) Dürr
(Switzerland) Studer

Third round
(United Kingdom) Holdsworth	2	4
10	(South Africa) Van Zyl	6	6
(United States) Susman	6	6
(Switzerland) Studer	3	2

Fourth round
10	(South Africa) Van Zyl	4	5
(United States) Susman	6	7

==== Section 8 ====
First round

Second round
(Sweden) Sandulf	4	2
(Canada) Berner	6	6
(France) Spinoza	5	1
15	(Australia) Tegart	7	6
(France) Burel	3	7	3
(United States) Prosen	6	5	6
(United Kingdom) Williams	2	2
2	(Brazil) Bueno	6	6

Third round
(Canada) Berner	3	0
15	(Australia) Tegart	6	6
(United States) Prosen	3	2
2	(Brazil) Bueno	6	6

Fourth round
15	(Australia) Tegart	6	4	5
2	(Brazil) Bueno	4	6	7

Preceded by 1964 Australian Championships – Women's singles	Grand Slam women's singles	Succeeded by 1964 Wimbledon Championships – Women's singles
