= 1955 French Championships – Women's singles =

Women's singles
- 1955 French Championships

Final
- Champion: (United Kingdom) Angela Mortimer
- Runner-up: (United States) Dorothy Knode
- Score: 2–6, 7–5, 10–8

Details
- Draw: 55
- Seeds: 16

Events
| Singles | men | women |
| Doubles | men | women |
| ← 1954 · | French Championships | · 1956 → |

Second-seeded Angela Mortimer defeated Dorothy Knode 2–6, 7–5, 10–8 in the final to win the women's singles tennis title at the 1955 French Championships.

== Seeds ==
The seeded players are listed below. Angela Mortimer is the champion; others show the round in which they were eliminated.

1. (United States) Beverley Fleitz (semifinals)
2. (United Kingdom) Angela Mortimer (champion)
3. (United States) Darlene Hard (second round)
4. (United States) Dorothy Knode (finalist)
5. (United Kingdom) Shirley Bloomer (quarterfinals)
6. (United Kingdom) Patricia Ward (third round)
7. (West Germany) Erika Vollmer (quarterfinals)
8. (France) Ginette Bucaille (quarterfinals)
9. (Hungary) Zsuzsi Körmöczy (first round)
10. (France) Maud Galtier (first round)
11. (Australia) Beryl Penrose (quarterfinals)
12. (South Africa) Hazel Redick-Smith (third round)
13. (United Kingdom) Angela Buxton (third round)
14. (West Germany) Toto Zehden (third round)
15. (France) Anne-Marie Seghers (second round)
16. (Italy) Lea Pericoli (third round)

== Draw ==
=== Key ===
- Q = Qualifier
- WC = Wild card
- LL = Lucky loser
- r = Retired

=== Finals ===
Quarterfinals
1 | (United States) Beverley Fleitz | 6 | 6
8 | (France) Ginette Bucaille | 1 | 1
4 | (United States) Dorothy Knode | 6 | 6
5 | (United Kingdom) Shirley Bloomer | 3 | 3
11 | (Australia) Beryl Penrose | 5 | 8 | 3
(Bermuda) Heather Brewer | 7 | 6 | 6
7 | (West Germany) Erika Vollmer | 3 | 4
2 | (United Kingdom) Angela Mortimer | 6 | 6

Semifinals
1 | (United States) Beverley Fleitz | 2 | 3
4 | (United States) Dorothy Knode | 6 | 6
(Bermuda) Heather Brewer | 1 | 1
2 | (United Kingdom) Angela Mortimer | 6 | 6

Finals
4 | (United States) Dorothy Knode | 6 | 5 | 8
2 | (United Kingdom) Angela Mortimer | 2 | 7 | 10

=== Earlier rounds ===
==== Section 1 ====
First round
(Australia) Hopman | 4
(Belgium) Isaac | 0 | r
9 | (Hungary) Körmöczy
(France) Bourbonnais
(West Germany) Vogler | 3 | 6 | 6
(France) Amouretti | 6 | 3 | 3

Second round
1 | (United States) Fleitz | 6 | 6
(Spain) De Riba | 1 | 2
16 | (Italy) Pericoli | 3 | 6 | 6
(France) Chatrier | 6 | 2 | 2
8 | (France) Bucaille | 6 | 7
(Australia) Hopman | 2 | 5
(France) Bourbonnais | 6 | 1 | 6
(West Germany) Vogler | 3 | 6 | 8

Third round
1 | (United States) Fleitz | 6 | 6
16 | (Italy) Pericoli | 2 | 2
8 | (France) Bucaille | 6 | 6
(West Germany) Vogler | 4 | 2

Quarterfinals
1 | (United States) Fleitz | 6 | 6
8 | (France) Bucaille | 1 | 1

==== Section 2 ====
First round
4 | (United States) Knode | 3 | 6 | 6
(Belgium) Mercelis | 6 | 3 | 3
(Spain) Villarnau | 1 | 3
(France) Patorni | 6 | 6
13 | (United Kingdom) Buxton | 6 | 6
(France) Dubois | 1 | 0
(Australia) Muller | 6 | 6
(United Kingdom) Middleton | 4 | 1
5 | (United Kingdom) Bloomer
(France) Varin
(United States) Ball
(France) Kermina
12 | (South Africa) Redick-Smith | 6 | 6
(France) De La Courtie | 2 | 3
(Italy) Sciaudone
(France) Gimault

Second round
4 | (United States) Knode | 6 | 6
(France) Patorni | 2 | 0
13 | (United Kingdom) Buxton | 6 | 6
(Australia) Muller | 4 | 3
5 | (United Kingdom) Bloomer | 6 | 7
(United States) Ball | 3 | 5
12 | (South Africa) Redick-Smith | 6 | 7
(France) Gimault | 0 | 5

Third round
4 | (United States) Knode | 6 | 7
13 | (United Kingdom) Buxton | 4 | 5
5 | (United Kingdom) Bloomer | 7 | 4 | 6
12 | (South Africa) Redick-Smith | 5 | 6 | 0

Quarterfinals
4 | (United States) Knode | 6 | 6
5 | (United Kingdom) Bloomer | 3 | 3

==== Section 3 ====
First round
(France) Schmitt | 6 | 6
(France) Haillet-Passet | 3 | 4
(Hungary) Jávori
11 | (Australia) Penrose
(Australia) Staley | 6 | 6
(Belgium) Crowet | 0 | 2
(France) Billaz | 8 | 6 | 2
6 | (United Kingdom) Ward | 10 | 4 | 6
(France) De Chambure | 7 | 2 | 6
(Italy) Ramorino | 5 | 6 | 1
(Switzerland) Kaufmann | 6 | 2 | 4
14 | (West Germany) Zehden | 3 | 6 | 6
(France) Cor | 1 | 1
(Bermuda) Brewer | 6 | 6
(France) Salvet | 3 | 3
3 | (United States) Hard | 6 | 6

Second round
(France) Schmitt | 0 | 6
11 | (Australia) Penrose | 6 | 8
(Australia) Staley | 4 | 2
6 | (United Kingdom) Ward | 6 | 6
(France) De Chambure | 5 | 4
14 | (West Germany) Zehden | 7 | 6
(Bermuda) Brewer | 4 | 7 | 6
3 | (United States) Hard | 6 | 5 | 3

Third round
11 | (Australia) Penrose | 6 | 6
6 | (United Kingdom) Ward | 4 | 3
14 | (West Germany) Zehden | 3 | 7 | 3
(Bermuda) Brewer | 6 | 5 | 6

Quarterfinals
11 | (Australia) Penrose | 7 | 6 | 6
(Bermuda) Brewer | 5 | 8 | 3

==== Section 4 ====
First round
(United States) Manset | 5 | 6 | 1
(France) Monnot | 7 | 2 | 6
(Netherlands) Ten Bosch | 9 | 5 | 6
10 | (France) Galtier | 7 | 7 | 3
(Belgium) Pouchain | 4 | 4
(France) Lemal | 6 | 6
(United States) Carter | 4 | 7 | 3
7 | (West Germany) Vollmer | 6 | 5 | 6

Second round
(France) Monnot | 3 | 1
(Netherlands) Ten Bosch | 6 | 6
(France) Lemal | 3 | 2
7 | (West Germany) Vollmer | 6 | 6
(South Africa) Kilian | 6 | 7
15 | (France) Seghers | 3 | 5
(United States) Leland | 1 | 2
2 | (United Kingdom) Mortimer | 6 | 6

Third round
(Netherlands) Ten Bosch | 2 | 2
7 | (West Germany) Vollmer | 6 | 6
(South Africa) Kilian | 5 | 5
2 | (United Kingdom) Mortimer | 7 | 7

Quarterfinals
7 | (West Germany) Vollmer | 6 | 6
2 | (United Kingdom) Mortimer | 3 | 4

| Preceded by 1955 Australian Championships – Women's singles | Grand Slam women's singles | Succeeded by 1955 Wimbledon Championships – Women's singles |
