= 1958 French Championships – Women's singles =

Women's singles
- 1958 French Championships

Final
- Champion: (Hungary) Zsuzsi Körmöczy
- Runner-up: (United Kingdom) Shirley Bloomer
- Score: 6–4, 1–6, 6–2

Details
- Draw: 64
- Seeds: 16

Events
Singles	men	women
Doubles	men	women
← 1957 ·	French Championships	· 1959 →

Third-seeded Zsuzsi Körmöczy defeated Shirley Bloomer 6–4, 1–6, 6–2 in the final to win the women's singles tennis title at the 1958 French Championships.

== Seeds ==
The seeded players are listed below. Zsuzsi Körmöczy is the champion; others show the round in which they were eliminated.

1. (United Kingdom) Shirley Bloomer (finalist)
2. (Australia) Lorraine Coghlan (third round)
3. (Hungary) Zsuzsi Körmöczy (champion)
4. (Czechoslovakia) Vera Puzejova (third round)
5. (United States) Dorothy Knode (quarterfinals)
6. (United Kingdom) Ann Haydon (quarterfinals)
7. (South Africa) Heather Segal (semifinals)
8. (Australia) Mary Hawton (second round)
9. (Belgium) Christiane Mercelis (second round)
10. (Australia) Thelma Long (third round)
11. (Italy) Silvana Lazzarino (second round)
12. (Mexico) Yola Ramírez (third round)
13. (Brazil) Maria Esther Bueno (semifinals)
14. (United States) Karol Fageros (second round)
15. (United Kingdom) Christine Truman (quarterfinals)
16. (Hungary) Márta Peterdy (third round)

== Draw ==
=== Key ===
- Q = Qualifier
- WC = Wild card
- LL = Lucky loser
- r = Retired

=== Finals ===
Quarterfinals
1	(United Kingdom) Shirley Bloomer	5	6	6
(Mexico) Rosa Maria Reyes	7	4	2
13	(Brazil) Maria Bueno	6	8
5	(United States) Dorothy Knode	2	6
6	(United Kingdom) Ann Haydon	3	4
3	(Hungary) Zsuzsa Körmöczy	6	6
7	(South Africa) Heather Segal	6	6
15	(United Kingdom) Christine Truman	2	1

Semifinals
1	(United Kingdom) Shirley Bloomer	2	6	6
13	(Brazil) Maria Bueno	6	1	2
3	(Hungary) Zsuzsa Körmöczy	6	6
7	(South Africa) Heather Segal	1	0

Finals
1	(United Kingdom) Shirley Bloomer	4	6	2
3	(Hungary) Zsuzsa Körmöczy	6	1	6

=== Earlier rounds ===
==== Section 1 ====
First round
1	(United Kingdom) Bloomer
(France) Seghers
(France) Salvet	1	3
(South Africa) Forbes	6	6
16	(Hungary) Peterdy	6	6
(France) Varin	1	1
(France) Jones-Veber
(Australia) Carter
8	(Australia) Hawton	6	6
(Chile) Ibarra	0	3
(France) Courteix	6	8
(Hungary) Brosszmann	4	6
9	(Belgium) Mercelis	11	6
(France) Coste	9	3
(France) Dubois	3	2
(Mexico) Reyes	6	6

Second round
1	(United Kingdom) Bloomer	6	9
(South Africa) Forbes	3	7
16	(Hungary) Peterdy	12	3	6
(France) Jones-Veber	10	6	4
8	(Australia) Hawton	4	6	1
(France) Courteix	6	2	6
9	(Belgium) Mercelis	4	2
(Mexico) Reyes	6	6

Third round
1	(United Kingdom) Bloomer	6	6
16	(Hungary) Peterdy	4	3
(France) Courteix	7	8
(Mexico) Reyes	9	10

Quarterfinals
1	(United Kingdom) Bloomer	5	6	6
(Mexico) Reyes	7	4	2

==== Section 2 ====
First round
4	(Czechoslovakia) Puzejova
(Mexico) Hernandez
(France) Nenot	0	4
(United Kingdom) Ward	6	6
13	(Brazil) Bueno	6	6
(France) Gimault	0	2
(United States) Troccole	10	8
(France) Kermina	12	10
5	(United States) Knode	6	6
(West Germany) Dittmeyer	4	4
(France) Chatrier
(France) Billaz
12	(Mexico) Ramírez	4	6	6
(Australia) Muller	6	1	1
(France) De Lansalut
(Uruguay) Puente

Second round
4	(Czechoslovakia) Puzejova	6	6
(United Kingdom) Ward	2	2
13	(Brazil) Bueno	6	6
(France) Kermina	1	1
5	(United States) Knode
(France) Billaz	w/o
12	(Mexico) Ramírez	6	6
(France) De Lansalut	0	2

Third round
4	(Czechoslovakia) Puzejova	5	7	3
13	(Brazil) Bueno	7	5	6
5	(United States) Knode	4	9	7
12	(Mexico) Ramírez	6	7	5

Quarterfinals
13	(Brazil) Bueno	6	8
5	(United States) Knode	2	6

==== Section 3 ====
First round
(New Zealand) Morrison	1	3
(South Africa) Reynolds	6	6
(Norway) Wrede-Holm	0	3
11	(Italy) Lazzarino	6	6
(Spain) Barril	3	3
(France) Galtier	6	6
(South Africa) Carr	3	5
6	(United Kingdom) Haydon	6	7
(France) Le Besnerais
(United States) Hay	w/o
(France) Monnot	6	1	3
14	(United States) Fageros	1	6	6
(Australia) Hellyer
(Argentina) Weiss
(France) Amouretti	4	2
3	(Hungary) Körmöczy	6	6

Second round
(South Africa) Reynolds	6	2	6
11	(Italy) Lazzarino	2	6	2
(France) Galtier	0	3
6	(United Kingdom) Haydon	6	6
(France) Le Besnerais	7	6
14	(United States) Fageros	5	3
(Australia) Hellyer	4	0
3	(Hungary) Körmöczy	6	6

Third round
(South Africa) Reynolds	3	3
6	(United Kingdom) Haydon	6	6
(France) Le Besnerais	3	3
3	(Hungary) Körmöczy	6	6

Quarterfinals
6	(United Kingdom) Haydon	6	6
3	(Hungary) Körmöczy	3	4

==== Section 4 ====
First round
(France) Bouchet	7	6
(France) Trauttmann	5	3
(United States) Carter	3	3
10	(Australia) Long	6	6
(France) De La Courtie	6	6
(New Zealand) Cox	4	4
(Australia) Martin
7	(South Africa) Segal
(France) Bucaille	6	6
(Netherlands) Rouwenhorst-Tekelenburg	3	3
(South Africa) Schuurman	4	1
15	(United Kingdom) Truman	6	6
(West Germany) Topel	0	0
(Italy) Pericoli	6	6
(Brazil) De Amorim
2	(Australia) Coghlan

Second round
(France) Bouchet	0	2
10	(Australia) Long	6	6
(France) De La Courtie	2	5
7	(South Africa) Segal	6	7
(France) Bucaille	3	4
15	(United Kingdom) Truman	6	6
(Italy) Pericoli	6	2	2
2	(Australia) Coghlan	4	6	6

Third round
10	(Australia) Long	8	3
7	(South Africa) Segal	10	6
15	(United Kingdom) Truman	6	6
2	(Australia) Coghlan	4	3

Quarterfinals
7	(South Africa) Segal	6	6
15	(United Kingdom) Truman	2	1

Preceded by 1958 Australian Championships – Women's singles	Grand Slam women's singles	Succeeded by 1958 Wimbledon Championships – Women's singles
