= 1954 Wimbledon Championships – Women's singles =

Woman's tennis tournament

Women's singles
- 1954 Wimbledon Championships

Final
- Champion: (United States) Maureen Connolly
- Runner-up: (United States) Louise Brough
- Score: 6–2, 7–5

Details
- Draw: 96 (10Q)
- Seeds: 8

Events
Singles	men	women		boys	girls
Doubles	men	women	mixed	boys	girls
- Wimbledon Championships

Maureen Connolly successfully defended her title, defeating Louise Brough in the final, 6–2, 7–5 to win the ladies' singles tennis title at the 1954 Wimbledon Championships.

== Seeds ==
1. (United States) Maureen Connolly (champion)
2. (United States) Doris Hart (semifinals)
3. (United States) Shirley Fry (quarterfinals)
4. (United States) Louise Brough (final)
5. (United States) Margaret duPont (quarterfinals)
6. (United Kingdom) Angela Mortimer (quarterfinals)
7. (United Kingdom) Helen Fletcher (quarterfinals)
8. (United States) Betty Pratt (semifinals)

Click on the seed number of a player to go to their draw section.

== Draw ==
Key

- Q = Qualifier
- WC = Wild card
- LL = Lucky loser
- Alt = Alternate
- ITF = ITF entry
- PR = Protected ranking
- SR = Special ranking
- SE = Special exempt
- JE = Junior exempt
- JR = Junior Accelerator Programme entrant
- CO = College Accelerator Programme entrant
- NG = Next Gen Accelerator Program entrant
- w/o = Walkover
- r = Retired
- d = Defaulted

=== Finals ===
Quarterfinals
2	(United States) Doris Hart	6	6
7	(United Kingdom) Helen Fletcher	1	3
4	(United States) Louise Brough	6	6
6	(United Kingdom) Angela Mortimer	1	3
8	(United States) Betty Pratt	6	9	6
3	(United States) Shirley Fry	4	11	3
5	(United States) Margaret duPont	1	1
1	(United States) Maureen Connolly	6	6

Semifinals
2	(United States) Doris Hart	6	3	3
4	(United States) Louise Brough	2	6	6
8	(United States) Betty Pratt	1	1
1	(United States) Maureen Connolly	6	6

Final
4	(United States) Louise Brough	2	5
1	(United States) Maureen Connolly	6	7

=== Top half ===
==== Section 1 ====
First round

Second round
2	(United States) Doris Hart	6	6
(United Kingdom) Georgie Woodgate	1	1
(New Zealand) Judy Burke	5	6	6
(United Kingdom) Elaine Watson	7	4	1
(Austria) Helga Strecker	3	5
(Japan) Sachiko Kamo	6	7
(Italy) Nicla Migliori	6	6
(Jamaica) Babs Praczukowski	4	0

Third round
2	(United States) D Hart	6	6
(New Zealand) J Burke	1	2
(Japan) S Kamo	3	9
(Italy) N Migliori	6	11

Fourth round
2	(United States) D Hart	6	6
(Italy) N Migliori	1	1

==== Section 2 ====
First round

Second round
7	(United Kingdom) Helen Fletcher	6	5	6
(Canada) Hanna Sladek	3	7	3
Q	(United Kingdom) Marion Boundy	0	0
(Switzerland) Ruth Kaufmann	6	6
Q	(United Kingdom) Mollie Govett	2	4
(United Kingdom) Peggy Dawson-Scott	6	6
(United Kingdom) Barbara Knapp	6	6
(United Kingdom) Billie Woodgate	1	2

Third round
7	(United Kingdom) H Fletcher	6	6
(Switzerland) R Kaufmann	3	1
(United Kingdom) P Dawson-Scott	9	8
(United Kingdom) B Knapp	7	6

Fourth round
7	(United Kingdom) H Fletcher	6	6
(United Kingdom) P Dawson-Scott	0	1

==== Section 3 ====
First round
4	(United States) Louise Brough	6	6
(United Kingdom) Pat Gotla	1	1
(United Kingdom) Sue Waters	1	7
(West Germany) Erika Vollmer	6	9
(United Kingdom) Vera Thomas	6	6
(France) Suzanne Schmitt	3	1
(Australia) Nell Hopman	6	2	3
(Republic of Ireland) June Fitzpatrick	3	6	6
(United States) Mary Morris	2	2
(United Kingdom) Pat Harrison	6	6
(United Kingdom) Rosemary Walsh	2	2
(United States) Barbara Kimbrell	6	6
(United States) Barbara Bradley	9	6
(United Kingdom) Jean Petchell	7	1
(Netherlands) Fenny ten Bosch	6	6
(United Kingdom) Hazel Cheadle	4	1

Second round
4	(United States) L Brough	6	6
(West Germany) E Vollmer	3	3
(United Kingdom) V Thomas	6	7
(Republic of Ireland) J Fitzpatrick	0	5
(United Kingdom) P Harrison	7	5	6
(United States) B Kimbrell	5	7	4
(United States) B Bradley	9	2
(Netherlands) F ten Bosch	7	0^{r}

Third round
4	(United States) L Brough	6	6
(United Kingdom) V Thomas	2	2
(United Kingdom) P Harrison	3	6
(United States) B Bradley	6	8

Fourth round
4	(United States) L Brough	6	6
(United States) B Bradley	1	1

==== Section 4 ====
First round
6	(United Kingdom) Angela Mortimer	6	6
(United Kingdom) Molly Stone	0	1
(United Kingdom) Norma Kemsey-Bourne	6	6
(United Kingdom) Sidney Brock	2	4
(United States) Gladys Heldman	0	0
(New Zealand) Heather Robson	6	6
(France) Ginette Bucaille	6	6
(United Kingdom) Valerie Pitt	3	3
(United Kingdom) Leonie Brighton	6	6
LL	(United Kingdom) Zena Lusty	1	0
Q	(Sweden) Margarita Bonström	1	8	4
(United Kingdom) Noelle Knight	6	6	5r
(Mexico) Melita Ramírez	6	6
Q	(Australia) Betty Ruffin	2	0
(Belgium) Poucette Coessens	2	3
(Argentina) Elena Lehmann	6	6

Second round
6	(United Kingdom) A Mortimer	6	6
(United Kingdom) N Kemsey-Bourne	0	2
(New Zealand) H Robson	3	1
(France) G Bucaille	6	6
(United Kingdom) L Brighton	6	3	3
Q	(Sweden) M Bonström	3	6	6
(Mexico) I Ramírez	6	7
(Argentina) E Lehmann	0	5

Third round
6	(United Kingdom) A Mortimer	6	6
(France) G Bucaille	0	2
Q	(Sweden) M Bonström	4	2
(Mexico) I Ramírez	6	6

Fourth round
6	(United Kingdom) A Mortimer	5	6	6
(Mexico) I Ramírez	7	4	2

=== Bottom half ===
==== Section 5 ====
First round
Q	(United Kingdom) Kathleen Stott	7	1
(United States) Kay Hubbell	9	6
LL	(South Africa) Audrey Bilse	5	3
(United Kingdom) Anne Shilcock	7	6
(United Kingdom) Margot Parker	3	2
(United Kingdom) Rosemary Bulleid	6	6
(New Zealand) Evelyn Attwood	3	2
(United Kingdom) Joan Curry	6	6
Q	(United Kingdom) Joan Quelch	1	3
(United States) Baba Lewis	6	6
Q	(United Kingdom) Jean Knight	5	6	6
Q	(United Kingdom) Denise Collier	7	4	3
(France) Nelly Adamson	6	6
Q	(United Kingdom) Chloe Rhodes	1	1
(Spain) María Josefa de Riba	1	2
8	(United States) Betty Pratt	6	6

Second round
(United States) K Hubbell	2	4
(United Kingdom) A Shilcock	6	6
(United Kingdom) R Bulleid	3	2
(United Kingdom) J Curry	6	6
(United States) B Lewis	6	8
Q	(United Kingdom) J Knight	0	6
(France) N Adamson	1^{r}
8	(United States) E Pratt	2

Third round
(United Kingdom) A Shilcock	3	3
(United Kingdom) J Curry	6	6
(United States) B Lewis	1	7
8	(United States) E Pratt	6	9

Fourth round
(United Kingdom) J Curry	3	6	3
8	(United States) E Pratt	6	3	6

==== Section 6 ====
First round
(United Kingdom) Evelyn Moeller	1	1
(United Kingdom) Pat Ward	6	6
(United Kingdom) Pat Hird	6	6
(United Kingdom) Lorna Cawthorn	4	1
(West Germany) Margot Dittmeyer	7	0
(United Kingdom) Mary Harris	9	6
(United Kingdom) Gem Hoahing	6	6
(Italy) Silvana Lazzarino	1	1
(Netherlands) Joopy Roos-Van der Wal	6	6
(United Kingdom) Thelma Lister	3	3
(United Kingdom) Bobbie Wilson	4	0
(United States) Dorothy Levine	6	6
(West Germany) Ingeborg Vogler	4	1
(France) Jacqueline Kermina	6	6
(Switzerland) Violette Alvensleben-Rigollet	4	4
3	(United States) Shirley Fry	6	6

Second round
(United Kingdom) P Ward	6	6
(United Kingdom) P Hird	3	1
(United Kingdom) M Harris	1	2
(United Kingdom) C Hoahing	6	6
(Netherlands) J Roos-Van der Wal	4	1
(United States) D Levine	6	6
(France) J Kermina	2	1
3	(United States) S Fry	6	6

Third round
(United Kingdom) P Ward	6	6
(United Kingdom) C Hoahing	0	1
(United States) D Levine	4	4
3	(United States) S Fry	6	6

Fourth round
(United Kingdom) P Ward	3	1
3	(United States) S Fry	6	6

==== Section 7 ====
First round

Second round
(Belgium) Christiane Mercelis	6	6
Q	(India) Rita Davar	1	0
(United Kingdom) Janet Morgan	6	7
(Austria) Elizabeth Broz	4	5
(Egypt) Betsy Abbas	6	6
(United Kingdom) Nancy Liebert	4	3
(United Kingdom) Viola White	1	0
5	(United States) Margaret duPont	6	6

Third round
(Belgium) C Mercelis	6	6
(United Kingdom) J Morgan	3	1
(Egypt) B Abbas	0	4
5	(United States) M duPont	6	6

Fourth round
(Belgium) C Mercelis	1	6
5	(United States) M duPont	6	8

==== Section 8 ====
First round

Second round
(United Kingdom) Angela Buxton	6	6
(United Kingdom) Valerie Lewis	1	1
(United Kingdom) Jennifer Middleton	4	6	5
(Bermuda) Heather Brewer	6	3	7
(United Kingdom) Lorna Byrne	0	3
(Argentina) Edda Buding	6	6
(South Africa) Joan Scott	0	3
1	(United States) Maureen Connolly	6	6

Third round
(United Kingdom) A Buxton	6	3	6
(Bermuda) H Brewer	1	6	3
(Argentina) E Buding	2	3
1	(United States) M Connolly	6	6

Fourth round
(United Kingdom) A Buxton	0	0
1	(United States) M Connolly	6	6

Preceded by 1954 French Championships – Women's singles	Grand Slam women's singles	Succeeded by 1954 U.S. National Championships – Women's singles
