= 1956 French Championships – Women's singles =

Women's singles
- 1956 French Championships

Final
- Champion: (United States) Althea Gibson
- Runner-up: (United Kingdom) Angela Mortimer
- Score: 6–0, 12–10

Details
- Draw: 55
- Seeds: 16

Events
Singles	men	women
Doubles	men	women
← 1955 ·	French Championships	· 1957 →

Althea Gibson defeated Angela Mortimer in the final, 6–0, 12–10 to win the women's singles tennis title at the 1956 French Championships. It was her first Grand Slam tournament title, and Gibson became the first African American to win a Grand Slam tournament.

== Seeds ==
The seeded players are listed below. Althea Gibson is the champion; others show the round in which they were eliminated.

1. (United Kingdom) Angela Mortimer (finalist)
2. (United States) Dorothy Knode (third round)
3. (United States) Althea Gibson (champion)
4. (Australia) Mary Hawton (first round)
5. (Hungary) Zsuzsi Körmöczy (semifinals)
6. (United Kingdom) Shirley Bloomer (quarterfinals)
7. (Belgium) Christiane Mercelis (second round)
8. (United States) Barbara Davidson (second round)
9. (France) Suzanne Le Besnerais (third round)
10. (West Germany) Edda Buding (quarterfinals)
11. (Australia) Thelma Long (third round)
12. (United States) Darlene Hard (third round)
13. (Italy) Annalissa Bellani (third round)
14. (France) Ginette Bucaille (third round)
15. (United Kingdom) Angela Buxton (semifinals)
16. (France) Myrtil Dubois (third round)

== Draw ==
=== Key ===
- Q = Qualifier
- WC = Wild card
- LL = Lucky loser
- r = Retired

=== Finals ===
Quarterfinals
1	(United Kingdom) Angela Mortimer	6	4	7
(Australia) Jenny Hoad	0	6	5
(West Germany) Ilse Buding	1	1
5	(Hungary) Zsuzsi Körmöczy	6	6
6	(United Kingdom) Shirley Bloomer	2	1
3	(United States) Althea Gibson	6	6
10	(West Germany) Edda Buding	6	2
15	(United Kingdom) Angela Buxton	8	6

Semifinals
1	(United Kingdom) Angela Mortimer	6	6
5	(Hungary) Zsuzsi Körmöczy	4	3
3	(United States) Althea Gibson	2	6	6
15	(United Kingdom) Angela Buxton	6	0	4

Finals
1	(United Kingdom) Angela Mortimer	0	10
3	(United States) Althea Gibson	6	12

=== Earlier rounds ===
==== Section 1 ====
First round
(Australia) Hoad	6	6
(France) Amouretti	1	3
9	(France) Le Besnerais
(Italy) Ramorino
(Australia) Hopman	6	5	3
(West Germany) Alhert	3	7	6

Second round
1	(United Kingdom) Mortimer	7	6
(France) Salvet	5	2
(Belgium) Pouchain	4	0
16	(France) Dubois	6	6
8	(United States) Davidson	6	2	5
(Australia) Hoad	1	6	7
9	(France) Le Besnerais	6	4	6
(West Germany) Alhert	1	6	4

Third round
1	(United Kingdom) Mortimer	6	6
16	(France) Dubois	1	2
(Australia) Hoad
9	(France) Le Besnerais

Quarterfinals
1	(United Kingdom) Mortimer	6	4	7
(Australia) Hoad	0	6	5

==== Section 2 ====
First round
4	(Australia) Hawton	6	4	3
(France) Lemal	1	6	6
(West Germany) Buding	6	6
(United Kingdom) Walter	0	2
(France) Bouchet	4	4
(South Africa) O'Donnell	6	6
13	(Italy) Bellani	6	6
(France) Launay	0	3
5	(Hungary) Körmöczy	6	6
(France) Varin	1	1
(Belgium) Coessens	3	4
(France) Monnot	6	6
(France) Kermina	6	6	6
(France) Trauttmann	0	8	2
12	(United States) Hard	6	5	6
(Brazil) Metzner	0	7	3

Second round
(France) Lemal	0	1
(West Germany) Buding	6	6
(South Africa) O'Donnell	2	4
13	(Italy) Bellani	6	6
5	(Hungary) Körmöczy	6	6
(France) Monnot	0	1
(France) Kermina	1	3
12	(United States) Hard	6	6

Third round
(West Germany) Buding	1	6	6
13	(Italy) Bellani	6	3	2
5	(Hungary) Körmöczy	4	7	6
12	(United States) Hard	6	5	3

Quarterfinals
(West Germany) Buding	1	1
5	(Hungary) Körmöczy	6	6

==== Section 3 ====
First round
(France) Trancart	1	2
11	(Australia) Long	6	6
(Italy) Migliori	3	6	6
(Netherlands) Wienese	6	4	3
(France) Bourbonnais	8	3	7
(France) Nenot	6	6	5
(Belgium) Isaac	1	3
6	(United Kingdom) Bloomer	6	6
14	(France) Bucaille	3	6	6
(Spain) Barril	6	2	2
(West Germany) Dittmeyer	3	6	4
(South Africa) Forbes	6	3	6
(Czechoslovakia) Puzejova	6	6
(France) Galtier	1	3
(France) Gimault	1	1
3	(United States) Gibson	6	6

Second round
11	(Australia) Long	7	6
(Italy) Migliori	5	2
(France) Bourbonnais	1	2
6	(United Kingdom) Bloomer	6	6
14	(France) Bucaille	0	6	6
(South Africa) Forbes	6	4	4
(Czechoslovakia) Puzejova	4	2
3	(United States) Gibson	6	6

Third round
11	(Australia) Long	3	5
6	(United Kingdom) Bloomer	6	7
14	(France) Bucaille	1	1
3	(United States) Gibson	6	6

Quarterfinals
6	(United Kingdom) Bloomer	2	1
3	(United States) Gibson	6	6

==== Section 4 ====
First round
(France) De Chambure	3	0
(Australia) Seeney	6	6
(France) Seghers	6	6
(Belgium) Crowet	3	2
10	(West Germany) Buding	6	6
(Switzerland) Wavre	1	4
(France) De La Courtie	4	2
7	(Belgium) Mercelis	6	6

Second round
(Australia) Seeney	6	7	9
(France) Seghers	8	5	7
10	(West Germany) Buding	6	9
7	(Belgium) Mercelis	4	7
15	(United Kingdom) Buxton	6	6
(Australia) Muller	4	4
(France) Coste	4	1
2	(United States) Knode	6	6

Third round
(Australia) Seeney	2	3
10	(West Germany) Buding	6	6
15	(United Kingdom) Buxton	4	7	6
2	(United States) Knode	6	5	1

Quarterfinals
10	(West Germany) Buding	6	2
15	(United Kingdom) Buxton	8	6

Preceded by 1956 Australian Championships – Women's singles	Grand Slam women's singles	Succeeded by 1956 Wimbledon Championships – Women's singles
