= 1965 French Championships – Women's singles =

Women's singles
- 1965 French Championships

Final
- Champion: (Australia) Lesley Turner
- Runner-up: (Australia) Margaret Smith
- Score: 6–3, 6–4

Details
- Seeds: 16

Events
Singles	men	women
Doubles	men	women
← 1964 ·	French Championships	· 1966 →

Third-seeded Lesley Turner defeated the first-seeded reigning champion, Margaret Smith, 6–3, 6–4 in the final to win the women's singles tennis title at the 1965 French Championships.

== Seeds ==
The seeded players are listed below. Lesley Turner is the champion; others show the round in which they were eliminated.

1. (Australia) Margaret Smith (finalist)
2. (Brazil) Maria Bueno (semifinals)
3. (Australia) Lesley Turner (champion)
4. (United States) Nancy Richey (semifinals)
5. (France) Françoise Dürr (quarterfinals)
6. (United Kingdom) Ann Jones (quarterfinals)
7. (South Africa) Annette Van Zyl (quarterfinals)
8. (Argentina) Norma Baylon (quarterfinals)
9. (West Germany) Helga Schultze (fourth round)
10. (United States) Jane Albert (second round)
11. (United States) Julie Heldman (second round)
12. (Australia) Madonna Schacht (second round)
13. (United Kingdom) Liz Starkie (fourth round)
14. (France) Jacqueline Rees-Lewis (third round)
15. (Australia) Gail Sherriff (fourth round)
16. (United States) Tory Fretz (second round)

== Draw ==
=== Key ===
- Q = Qualifier
- WC = Wild card
- LL = Lucky loser
- r = Retired

=== Finals ===
Quarterfinals
1	(Australia) Margaret Smith	6	6
8	(Argentina) Norma Baylon	3	1
4	(United States) Nancy Richey	8	9
5	(France) Françoise Dürr	6	7
6	(United Kingdom) Ann Jones
3	(Australia) Lesley Turner
7	(South Africa) Annette Van Zyl	4	3
2	(Brazil) Maria Bueno	6	6

Semifinals
1	(Australia) Margaret Smith	7	6
4	(United States) Nancy Richey	5	4
3	(Australia) Lesley Turner	2	6	8
2	(Brazil) Maria Bueno	6	4	6

Finals
1	(Australia) Margaret Smith	3	4
3	(Australia) Lesley Turner	6	6

=== Earlier rounds ===
==== Section 1 ====
First round

Second round
1	(Australia) Smith	6	6
(France) Varin	0	0
(France) Langanay	2	4
(Italy) Riedl	6	6
16	(United States) Fretz	4	2
(Czechoslovakia) Vopičková	6	6
(Australia) Sherriff	6	1	1
(United Kingdom) Cawthorn	2	6	6

Third round
1	(Australia) Smith	6	6
(Italy) Riedl	1	0
(Czechoslovakia) Vopičková	6	6
(United Kingdom) Cawthorn	2	4

Fourth round
1	(Australia) Smith	6	6
(Czechoslovakia) Vopičková	0	3

==== Section 2 ====
First round

Second round
9	(West Germany) Schultze	6	6
(France) Boulle	2	0
(Brazil) Schwartz
(United Kingdom) Lloyd
8	(Argentina) Baylon	6	6
(United States) Prosen	0	3
(France) Mizen	0	4
(Australia) McClenaughan	6	6

Third round
9	(West Germany) Schultze	5	6	6
(United Kingdom) Lloyd	7	1	0
8	(Argentina) Baylon	6	2	6
(Australia) McClenaughan	1	6	0

Fourth round
9	(West Germany) Schultze	6	4	2
8	(Argentina) Baylon	1	6	6

==== Section 3 ====
First round
(France) Darmon	1	5
(South Africa) Emmanuel	6	7
13	(United Kingdom) Starkie	6	6
(West Germany) Niessen	4	4
(France) Tacchini	4	6	4
(United States) Tym	6	4	6
(South Africa) Wiggill	6	3	2
(Mexico) Reyes	4	6	6
(Spain) Pombo De Peredo	4	1
(France) Venturino	6	6

Second round
4	(United States) Richey	6	6
(France) Terras	4	2
(Belgium) Mercelis	6	6
(South Africa) Emmanuel	0	2
13	(United Kingdom) Starkie	6	6
(United States) Tym	4	1
(Mexico) Reyes	4	8
(France) Venturino	6	10

Third round
4	(United States) Richey	6	6
(Belgium) Mercelis	1	1
13	(United Kingdom) Starkie	6	6
(France) Venturino	3	2

Fourth round
4	(United States) Richey	6	6
13	(United Kingdom) Starkie	2	3

==== Section 4 ====
First round
5	(France) Dürr
(Switzerland) Studer
(United Kingdom) McAnally
(South Africa) Diepraam
(Hungary) Peterdy-Wolf	4	3
(Australia) Blackman	6	6
(Canada) Berner	1	2
(Netherlands) Groenman	6	6
12	(Australia) Schacht	6	6
(Argentina) Giscafré	3	2
(United Kingdom) Dennis	3	4
(France) Spinoza	6	6
(Spain) Estalella	4	3
(France) Seghers	6	6
(Australia) Harris	2	5
(West Germany) Sturm	6	7

Second round
5	(France) Dürr	7	6
(South Africa) Diepraam	5	0
(Australia) Blackman	3	6	6
(Netherlands) Groenman	6	4	1
12	(Australia) Schacht
(France) Spinoza
(France) Seghers	3	6	6
(West Germany) Sturm	6	2	4

Third round
5	(France) Dürr	6	8	7
(Australia) Blackman	0	10	5
(France) Spinoza	6	1	4
(France) Seghers	2	6	6

Fourth round
5	(France) Dürr	6	6
(France) Seghers	3	0

==== Section 5 ====
First round
(France) Burel	3	1
(Mexico) Subirats	6	6
(France) Berson	2	2
(Australia) Lesh	6	6
(West Germany) Schultze	3	0
(Czechoslovakia) Volavková	6	6
(France) Galtier	4	0
11	(United States) Heldman	6	6
(Sweden) Lundqvist	3	2
(South Africa) Walkden	6	6
(West Germany) Schildknecht	6	2	5
(France) Kermina	3	6	7
(Italy) Perna
(Spain) Coronado
(United States) Habicht	0	3
6	(United Kingdom) Jones	6	6

Second round
(Mexico) Subirats	1	7	1
(Australia) Lesh	6	5	6
(Czechoslovakia) Volavková	6	6
11	(United States) Heldman	2	3
(South Africa) Walkden	6	6
(France) Kermina	1	2
(Spain) Coronado	0	1
6	(United Kingdom) Jones	6	6

Third round
(Australia) Lesh	2	1
(Czechoslovakia) Volavková	6	6
(South Africa) Walkden	3	4
6	(United Kingdom) Jones	6	6

Fourth round
(Czechoslovakia) Volavková	2	1
6	(United Kingdom) Jones	6	6

==== Section 6 ====
First round
(United States) Footman
(Netherlands) Krocké
(Spain) Barril	3	6	0
(West Germany) Buding	6	3	6
(France) Le Besnerais	4	0
(South Africa) Swan	6	6
(United Kingdom) Williams	3	4
14	(France) Rees-Lewis	6	6
(France) Bouteleux	6	3	3
(United States) Arnold	0	6	6
(Italy) Beltrame	3	2
(France) Salfati	6	6

Second round
(Netherlands) Krocké	2	4
(West Germany) Buding	6	6
(South Africa) Swan	3	2
14	(France) Rees-Lewis	6	6
(United States) Arnold	5	6	8
(France) Salfati	7	1	6
(France) Nenot	4	2
3	(Australia) Turner	6	6

Third round
(West Germany) Buding	6	6
14	(France) Rees-Lewis	3	4
(United States) Arnold	2	1
3	(Australia) Turner	6	6

Fourth round
(West Germany) Buding	5	4
3	(Australia) Turner	7	6

==== Section 7 ====
First round

Second round
(United Kingdom) Holdsworth	3	1
(Soviet Union) Dmitrieva	6	6
(Australia) Toyne	6	6
10	(United States) Albert	1	3
(Austria) Leyrer	3	3
(France) Lieffrig	6	6
(France) Seghers	0	1
7	(South Africa) Van Zyl	6	6

Third round
(Soviet Union) Dmitrieva	6	3
(Australia) Toyne	8	6
(France) Lieffrig	3	4
7	(South Africa) Van Zyl	6	6

Fourth round
(Australia) Toyne	2	7
7	(South Africa) Van Zyl	6	9

==== Section 8 ====
First round

Second round
(Ecuador) Zuleta	7	2	2
(Sweden) Löfdahl	5	6	6
(France) Rouchon	1	1
15	(Australia) Sherriff	6	6
(France) De Lansalut	3	5
(Netherlands) Stöve	6	7
(France) Repoux
2	(Brazil) Bueno

Third round
(Sweden) Löfdahl	3	6	4
15	(Australia) Sherriff	6	4	6
(Netherlands) Stöve	1	2
2	(Brazil) Bueno	6	6

Fourth round
15	(Australia) Sherriff	1	6	4
2	(Brazil) Bueno	6	3	6

Preceded by 1965 Australian Championships – Women's singles	Grand Slam women's singles	Succeeded by 1965 Wimbledon Championships – Women's singles
