= Colombia International Championships =

Tennis tournament in Colombia

Defunct tennis tournament
- Tour: ILTF Circuit
- Founded: 1951; 75 years ago
- Abolished: 1970; 56 years ago
- Location: Barranquilla, Colombia
- Venue: Country Club of Barranquilla
- Surface: Clay

The Colombia International Championships also known as the International Championships of Colombia was a men's and women's clay court tennis tournament established in 1951 and played at the Country Club of Barranquilla, Barranquilla, Colombia, until 1970.

The tournament was known locally as the City of Barranquilla Championships or Campeonato Ciudad de Barranquilla.

== History ==
The Colombian International (Colombiano Internacional) and known locally as the City of Barranquilla Championships (Campeonato Ciudad de Barranquilla) was established in 1951, and played on clay courts initially in Bogotá, before moving to the Country Club of Barranquilla, Barranquilla, Colombia. The tournament was part ILTF Caribbean Circuit which was a sub circuit of the international tennis tour in from the 1950s to early 1970s. The tournament was staged annually until 1970 when it was discontinued.

== Finals ==
=== Men's singles ===
Incomplete roll

Results included:

Year	Champion	Runner-up	Score
1952	(United States) Gardnar Mulloy	(Mexico) Gustavo Palafox	6–4, 6–2, 6–2
1953	(United States) Art Larsen	(United States) Budge Patty	6–4, 1–6, 6–2, 6–3
1954	(United States) Art Larsen (2)	(Colombia) Dario Behar	6–2, 4–6, 6–3, 7–5
1955	(United States) Tony Trabert	(United States) Tom Brown	6–3, 6–3, 6–4
1956	(United States) Tom Brown	(Mexico) Mario Llamas	6–1, 6–0, 6–4
1957	(Australia) Mervyn Rose	(Australia) Don Candy	6–1, 4–6, 6–1, 8–6
1958	(Chile) Luis Ayala	(Australia) Warren Woodcock	9–11, 6–3, 6–3, 11–9
1959	(Chile) Luis Ayala (2)	(United States) Bernard Bartzen	6–4, 6–4, 6–1
1960	(Australia) Neale Fraser	(Chile) Luis Ayala	5–7, 2–6, 6–4, 7–5, 6–4
1961	(Spain) Manuel Santana	(Australia) Rod Laver	6–4, 6–2, 6–1
1962	(Australia) Roy Emerson	(Spain) Manuel Santana	6–3, 3–6, 6–1, 3–6, 8–6
1963	(Spain) Manuel Santana (2)	(Socialist Federal Republic of Yugoslavia) Boro Jovanović	6–1, 6–4, 6–3
1964	(Australia) Roy Emerson (2)	(Spain) Manuel Santana	8–10, 6–3, 6–2, 6–1
1965	(Spain) Manuel Santana (3)	(India) Ramanathan Krishnan	6–2, 9–7, 6–3
1966	(Australia) Martin Mulligan	(France) François Jauffret	9–11, 6–2, 7–5, 2–6, 12–10
1967	(Australia) John Newcombe	(Australia) Tony Roche	2–6, 6–3, 6–4, 6–4
↓ Open Era ↓
1968	(Netherlands) Tom Okker	(United States) Marty Riessen	6–4, 6–4, 6–4
1969	(Romania) Ilie Năstase	(Czechoslovakia) Jan Kodeš	6–4, 6–4, 8–10, 2–6, 6–3
1970	(Socialist Federal Republic of Yugoslavia) Željko Franulović	(Socialist Federal Republic of Yugoslavia) Nikola Špear	9–7, 6–3, 6–3

=== Women's singles ===
Incomplete roll

Year	Champion	Runner-up	Score
1951	(Ecuador) Alicia Wright	?	?
1952	(Mexico) Melita Ramirez	(United States) Betty Rosenquest Pratt	7–5, 6–5
1953	(United States) Shirley Fry	(United States) Doris Hart	4–6, 6–4, 6–3
1955	(United States) Doris Hart	(United States) Dottie Head Knode	8–6, 7–5
1956	(United States) Shirley Fry (2)	(United States) Dorothy Watman Levine	6–4, 6–2
1957	(United Kingdom) Shirley Bloomer	(United Kingdom) Angela Buxton	6–3, 6–3
1958	(United States) Janet Hopps	(Brazil) Maria Bueno	6–3, 7–5
1959	(United States) Dottie Head Knode	(Brazil) Maria Bueno	1–6, 6–2, 6–2
1960	(Brazil) Maria Bueno	(United Kingdom) Ann Haydon	6–2, 6–2
1961	(Brazil) Maria Bueno (2)	(United States) Darlene Hard	6–4, 6–3
1962	(South Africa) Renee Schuurman	(Mexico) Yola Ramírez	6–2, 6–4
1963	(Australia) Lesley Turner	(Brazil) Maria Bueno	3–6, 6–3, 6–2
1964	(France) Françoise Dürr	(United States) Judy Alvarez	6–0, 6–2
1965	(Australia) Lesley Turner (2)	(Australia) Margaret Smith	1–6, 6–4, 6–4
1966	(Argentina) Norma Baylon	(Netherlands) Betty Stove	6–0, 6–1
1967	(United Kingdom) Ann Haydon Jones	(France) Françoise Dürr	6–3, 6–4
1968	(United States) Nancy Richey	(Australia) Lesley Turner Bowrey	6–3, 6–4
↓ Open Era ↓
1969	(United States) Julie Heldman	(United States) Peaches Bartkowicz	5–7, 6–2, 6–3
1970	(United States) Mary Ann Eisel Curtis	(United States) Patti Hogan	6–3, 7–5

== See also ==
- International Tennis Championships of Colombia
