= 1954 French Championships – Women's singles =

Women's singles
- 1954 French Championships

Final
- Champion: (United States) Maureen Connolly
- Runner-up: (France) Ginette Bucaille
- Score: 6–4, 6–1

Details
- Draw: 54
- Seeds: 16

Events
Singles	men	women
Doubles	men	women
← 1953 ·	French Championships	· 1955 →

First-seeded Maureen Connolly defeated Ginette Bucaille 6–4, 6–1 in the final to win the women's singles tennis title at the 1954 French Championships.

== Seeds ==
The seeded players are listed below. Maureen Connolly is the champion; others show the round in which they were eliminated.

1. (United States) Maureen Connolly (champion)
2. (France) Nelly Adamson (semifinals)
3. (United Kingdom) Helen Fletcher (first round)
4. (Italy) Silvana Lazzarino (semifinals)
5. (France) Anne-Marie Seghers (quarterfinals)
6. (United States) Baba Mercedes Lewis (third round)
7. (Mexico) Yola Ramírez (third round)
8. (Germany) Toto Zehden (third round)
9. n/a
10. (United States) Dorothy Levine (quarterfinals)
11. (France) Ginette Bucaille (finalist)
12. (France) Jacqueline Kermina (third round)
13. (United Kingdom) A. Baxter (first round)
14. (Spain) Pilar Barril (second round)
15. (United Kingdom) Shirley Bloomer (third round)
16. (Italy) Nicla Migliori (second round)

== Draw ==
=== Key ===
- Q = Qualifier
- WC = Wild card
- LL = Lucky loser
- r = Retired

=== Finals ===
Quarterfinals
1	(United States) Maureen Connolly	6	6
(United Kingdom) Angela Buxton	1	0
4	(Italy) Silvana Lazzarino	6	6
5	(France) Anne-Marie Seghers	3	3
11	(France) Ginette Bucaille	6	6
(France) Josette Amouretti	1	1
10	(United States) Dorothy Levine	1	2
2	(France) Nelly Adamson	6	6

Semifinals
1	(United States) Maureen Connolly	6	6
4	(Italy) Silvana Lazzarino	0	1
11	(France) Ginette Bucaille	6	6
2	(France) Nelly Adamson	2	4

Finals
1	(United States) Maureen Connolly	6	6
11	(France) Ginette Bucaille	4	1

=== Earlier rounds ===
==== Section 1 ====
First round
(France) Varin	4	7
(Australia) Hopman	6	5
14	(Spain) Barril	6	6
(France) Bernard	3	4
(Belgium) Mercelis	1	2
(United Kingdom) Buxton	6	6

Second round
1	(United States) Connolly	6	6
(France) Salvet	0	2
16	(Italy) Migliori	4	3
(France) Galtier	6	6
8	(Germany) Zehden	8	7	7
(France) Varin	6	9	5
14	(Spain) Barril	2	2
(United Kingdom) Buxton	6	6

Third round
1	(United States) Connolly	6	6
(France) Galtier	2	3
8	(Germany) Zehden	3	4
(United Kingdom) Buxton	6	6

Quarterfinals
1	(United States) Connolly	6	6
(United Kingdom) Buxton	1	0

==== Section 2 ====
First round
4	(Italy) Lazzarino
(France) De La Giroday
(Belgium) Coessens	6	7
(France) Bras	1	5
13	(United Kingdom) Baxter
(France) Schmitt
(United States) Morris	1	1
(France) Patorni	6	6
5	(France) Seghers	6	6
(France) Labesse	1	0
(United Kingdom) Mottram
(Switzerland) Alvensleben
(France) Geranton	2	1
(United States) Kimbrell	6	6
(France) De La Courtie	0	3
12	(France) Kermina	6	6

Second round
4	(Italy) Lazzarino	7	6	6
(Belgium) Coessens	9	0	0
(France) Schmitt	8	7
(France) Patorni	6	5
5	(France) Seghers	6	6
(Switzerland) Alvensleben	2	0
(United States) Kimbrell	6	3	1
12	(France) Kermina	2	6	6

Third round
4	(Italy) Lazzarino	6	6
(France) Schmitt	1	4
5	(France) Seghers	6	6
12	(France) Kermina	1	3

Quarterfinals
4	(Italy) Lazzarino	6	6
5	(France) Seghers	3	3

==== Section 3 ====
First round
(United Kingdom) Sargeant	7	4
(France) Coste	9	6
(Belgium) Isaac	3	2
11	(France) Bucaille	6	6
(United Kingdom) Walter	0	2
(Switzerland) Kaufmann	6	6
(France) Monnot	2	3
6	(United States) Lewis	6	6
(France) Amouretti	3	6	6
(United States) Bradley	6	4	2
(Germany) Buding	6	6
(Germany) Vollmer	2	4
(France) Bourbonnais	6	6
(United States) Folger	0	0
(Belgium) Crowet
3	(United Kingdom) Fletcher

Second round
(France) Coste	0	0
11	(France) Bucaille	6	6
(Switzerland) Kaufmann	3	6	4
6	(United States) Lewis	6	4	6
(France) Amouretti	6	6
(Germany) Buding	2	4
(France) Bourbonnais	6	6
(Belgium) Crowet	0	0

Third round
11	(France) Bucaille	7	6
6	(United States) Lewis	5	2
(France) Amouretti	10	6	6
(France) Bourbonnais	12	1	4

Quarterfinals
11	(France) Bucaille	6	6
(France) Amouretti	1	1

==== Section 4 ====
First round
(France) Dubois	4	9
(France) Lemal	6	11
(France) De Chambure	6	0	3
10	(United States) Levine	3	6	6
(Sweden) Bonstrom	2	3
(France) Dubois	6	6

Second round
(France) Lemal	6	0	3
10	(United States) Levine	3	6	6
(France) Dubois	1	1
7	(Mexico) Ramírez	6	6
(Egypt) Abbas	1	4
15	(United Kingdom) Bloomer	6	6
(New Zealand) Robson	3	0
2	(France) Adamson	6	6

Third round
10	(United States) Levine	1	6	6
7	(Mexico) Ramírez	6	4	2
15	(United Kingdom) Bloomer	6	3	3
2	(France) Adamson	4	6	6

Quarterfinals
10	(United States) Levine	6	6
2	(France) Adamson	1	2

Preceded by 1954 Australian Championships – Women's singles	Grand Slam women's singles	Succeeded by 1954 Wimbledon Championships – Women's singles
