= Lea Pericoli =

Italian tennis player and journalist (1935–2024)

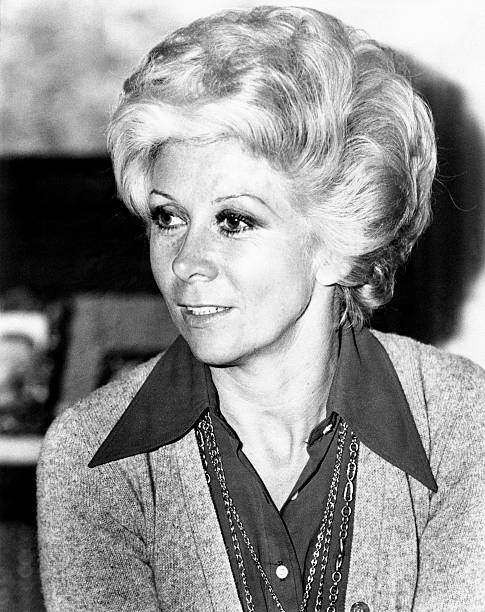
- Pericoli in 1974
- Country (sports): Italy
- Born: 22 March 1935 Milan, Italy
- Died: 4 October 2024 (aged 89) Milan, Italy

Singles
- Career record: no value

Grand Slam singles results
- Australian Open: 2R (1965)
- French Open: 4R (1955, 1960, 1964, 1971)
- Wimbledon: 4R (1965, 1967, 1970)

Doubles
- Career record: no value

Grand Slam doubles results
- Australian Open: 1R (1965)
- French Open: SF (1964)
- Wimbledon: QF (1960)

Lea Pericoli (22 March 1935 – 4 October 2024) was an Italian tennis player and later television presenter and journalist from Milan. She reached the last sixteen of the French Open twice and the Wimbledon Championships three times, and is also famous for her choice of clothing.

== Tennis ==
=== Grand Slam ===
Pericoli reached the last sixteen of the French Championships singles in 1960 and 1964. She reached the fourth round of Wimbledon three times in 1965, 1967, and 1970.

=== Titles ===
Pericoli won the Belgian open of 1955, after a win over Christiane Mercelis in the final, 6-3, 6-3.

Partnered by Helga Schultze, Pericoli won the doubles title at the 1974 WTA Swiss Open, defeating Kayoko Fukuoka and Michelle Rodríguez in the final in straight sets.

=== Fed Cup ===
Pericoli made her Fed Cup debut for Italy in its inaugural year, 1963, and represented Italy in nine years of the competition, winning 8 of her 16 singles matches and 7 of her 14 doubles matches. Her last Fed Cup match was in 1975.

=== Italian international championships ===
She partnered with Silvana Lazzarino to reach five women's doubles finals in six years (1962–65, 1967) at the Italian International Championships, with four of those coming in consecutive years.

== Clothing ==
In 1955, Pericoli played at the Wimbledon Championships wearing clothes designed by Ted Tinling. Her clothing generated so much interest in later years, that it was kept secret until her appearances on the court. In particular, her fur-lined clothing worn at the 1964 Wimbledon Championships caught the attention of observers.

In 2001, the Sunday Mirror quoted Pericoli as saying "I became famous because of my clothes, not my playing." and "I didn't make any money from tennis, but if I'd been born 30 years later I would have become terribly rich like Anna Kournikova".

== Other activities ==
Pericoli had a contract with Superga for modelling shoes.

Pericoli was popular on Italian television in the 1970s, presenting the programs Paroliamo and Caccia al Tesoro in addition to commentating tennis.

Pericoli was introduced to journalism by Indro Montanelli. She worked as a tennis and fashion journalist. She was a journalist for Il Giornale.

Pericoli wrote the autobiographical book Maldafrica, published in Italian in 2009. ISBN 978-88-317-9889-1

== Personal life and death ==
She married Tito Fontana in 1964. Pericoli died on 4 October 2024, at the age of 89.

== Awards ==
On 7 May 2015, in the presence of the President of Italian National Olympic Committee (CONI), Giovanni Malagò, the Walk of Fame of Italian sport, consisting of 100 tiles that chronologically feature names of the most representative athletes in Italian sport history, was inaugurated in the Olympic Park of the Foro Italico in Rome, along Viale delle Olimpiadi. On each tile is the honoree's name and sport and the symbol of CONI. One of these tiles is dedicated to Lea Pericoli.

Pericoli was awarded the Fed Cup Award of Excellence in 2007.

== Grand Slam singles performance timeline ==
Key
W	F	SF	QF	#R	RR	Q#	DNQ	A	NH

(W) winner; (F) finalist; (SF) semifinalist; (QF) quarterfinalist; (#R) rounds 4, 3, 2, 1; (RR) round-robin stage; (Q#) qualification round; (DNQ) did not qualify; (A) absent; (NH) not held; (SR) strike rate (events won / competed); (W–L) win–loss record.

Tournament	1955	1956	1957	1958	1959	1960	1961	1962	1963	1964	1965	1966	1967	1968	1969	1970	1971	1972	1973	1974	1975	Win–loss
Australian Open	A	A	A	A	A	A	A	A	A	A	2R	A	A	A	A	A	A	A	A	A	A	1–0
French Open	3R	A	1R	3R	A	4R	1R	3R	A	4R	A	A	A	2R	1R	1R	3R	A	A	1R	1R	11–10
Wimbledon	2R	A	A	A	3R	3R	2R	2R	3R	3R	4R	1R	4R	1R	3R	4R	2R	A	A	A	2R	15–14
US Open	A	A	A	A	A	A	A	A	A	A	A	A	A	A	A	A	A	A	A	A	A	0–0

== See also ==
- Walk of Fame of Italian sport
