= Christiane Spinoza =

French tennis player

- Country (sports): France
- Born: 1 April 1945 (age 79)

Singles

Grand Slam singles results
- French Open: 3R (1963, 1965, 1966)
- Wimbledon: 2R (1966, 1969)
- US Open: 1R (1970)

Doubles

Grand Slam doubles results
- French Open: 2R (1965, 1966, 1968, 1969, 1970, 1971)
- Wimbledon: 2R (1968, 1970)
- US Open: 1R (1970)

Grand Slam mixed doubles results
- French Open: 2R (1963, 1964)
- Wimbledon: 2R (1966)

Christiane Spinoza (born 1 April 1945) is a French former professional tennis player.

Active on tour in the 1960s and 1970s, Spinoza reached the singles third round of the French Championships on three occasions and made the second round at Wimbledon twice.

Spinoza was a member of the France Federation Cup team in 1970 and won the deciding doubles rubber of World Group ties against Japan and Italy, both partnering Gail Chanfreau. In the World Group quarter-final, which they lost to West Germany, she played her only singles rubber and was beaten by Helga Hösl.

== See also ==
- List of France Fed Cup team representatives
