= Pilar Barril =

Spanish tennis player (1931–2011)

- Country (sports): Spain
- Born: 31 October 1931; Barcelona, Spain
- Died: 30 September 2011 (aged 79)
- Plays: Right-handed

Singles
- Career titles: 5

Grand Slam singles results
- French Open: QF (1961)
- Wimbledon: 2R
- US Open: 2R

Doubles

Grand Slam doubles results
- French Open: QF
- Wimbledon: 2R

Grand Slam mixed doubles results
- French Open: SF
- Wimbledon: 2R

Pilar Barril (10 October 1931 – 30 September 2011) was a Spanish tennis player who was active during the 1950s and early 1960s. She and María Josefa de Riba were the first Spanish women to play international tennis tournaments after World War II.

== Career ==
She was the first Spanish woman to reach the quarterfinals of the French Open since Lilí de Álvarez. She was also a semifinalist in the 1956 mixed doubles. She appeared regularly at the French Open during the 1950s and 1960s. No other Spanish player reached a quarterfinal at a Grand Slam until Arantxa Sánchez Vicario in 1987.

== Career finals ==
=== Singles (5–7) ===
Result	No.	Date	Tournament	Surface	Opponent	Score
Loss	1.	29 August 1954	S'Agaró International, Spain	Clay	(Spain) María Josefa de Riba	4–6, 2–6
Loss	2.	26 December 1954	Barcelona, Spain	Clay	(Belgium) Christiane Mercelis	3–6, 3–6
Loss	3.	6 June 1960	Barcelona, Spain	Clay	(South Africa) Heather Segal	1–6, 1–6
Win	4.	2 January 1961	Valencia, Spain	Clay	(Italy) Lucia Bassi	6–0, 6–4
Loss	5.	30 July 1961	Evian, France	Clay	(France) Rosie Darmon	2–6, 5–7
Win	6.	10 June 1962	Barcelona, Spain	Clay	(Australia) Mary Hawton	6–2, 2–6, 7–5
Loss	7.	1 January 1963	Valencia, Spain	Clay	(Spain) Carmen Coronado	2–6, 2–6
Loss	8.	9 October 1963	San Sebastián, Spain	Clay	(United States) Mary Habicht	6–3, 4–6, 2–6
Win	9.	10 August 1964	Lisbon, Portugal	Clay	(Australia) Fay Toyne	6–2, 6–2
Win	10.	4 October 1964	Barcelona, Spain	Clay	(Italy) Roberta Beltrame	6–4, 5–7, 6–4
Loss	11.	15 November 1964	Barcelona, Spain	Clay	(Australia) Fay Toyne	1–6, 1–6
Win	12.	13 November 1966	Barcelona, Spain	Clay	(Spain) María José Aubet	6–2, 6–4

=== Doubles (2–5) ===
Result	No.	Date	Tournament	Surface	Partner	Opponents	Score
Loss	1.	October 1953	Barcelona, Spain	Clay	(Spain) Alicia Guri	(Spain) María Josefa de Riba (Spain) Isabel Maier	5–7, 1–6
Loss	2.	30 December 1956	Barcelona, Spain	Clay	(Spain) Alicia Guri	(West Germany) Edda Buding (West Germany) Ilse Buding	3–6, 2–6
Win	3.	6 June 1960	Barcelona, Spain	Clay	(Spain) Carmen Coronado	(Spain) Alicia Guri (Spain) Mercedes Solsona	6–1, 8–6
Win	4.	11 June 1961	Barcelona, Spain	Clay	(Spain) Carmen Coronado	(Spain) Ana María Estalella (United Kingdom) Peggy Templer	8–6, 6–0
Loss	5.	26 April 1964	Madrid, Spain	Clay	(Germany) Hedie Schildknecht	(Spain) Ana María Estalella (Spain) Marta Pombo de Pereda	6–4, 2–6, 1–6
Loss	6.	7 June 1964	Barcelona, Spain	Clay	(Mexico) Elena Subirats	(Spain) Carmen Coronado (Spain) Ana María Estalella	2–6, 4–6
Loss	7.	15 November 1964	Barcelona, Spain	Clay	(Spain) Alicia Guri	(Spain) Carmen Coronado (Australia) Fay Toyne	3–6, 1–6

=== Mixed doubles (1–2) ===
Result	No.	Date	Tournament	Surface	Partner	Opponents	Score
Loss	1.	29 August 1954	S'Agaró International, Spain	Clay	(France) François Garnero	(Spain) Emilio Martínez (Spain) María Josefa de Riba	2–6, 6–3, 4–6
Win	2.	1 January 1956	Valencia, Spain	Clay	(Italy) Antonio Maggi	(Germany) Edda Buding (Italy) Cesare Guercilana	8–6, 6–0
Loss	3.	2 January 1961	Valencia, Spain	Clay	(Spain) José Luis Arilla	(Spain) Ana María Estalella (Spain) Antonio Martínez	2–6, 6–2, 6–8

== Grand Slam singles tournament timeline ==
Key
W	F	SF	QF	#R	RR	Q#	DNQ	A	NH

(W) winner; (F) finalist; (SF) semifinalist; (QF) quarterfinalist; (#R) rounds 4, 3, 2, 1; (RR) round-robin stage; (Q#) qualification round; (DNQ) did not qualify; (A) absent; (NH) not held; (SR) strike rate (events won / competed); (W–L) win–loss record.

Tournament	1953	1954	1955	1956	1957	1958	1959	1960	1961	1962	1963	1964	1965	1966	Win–loss
Australia	A	A	A	A	A	A	A	A	A	A	A	A	A	A	0 / 0
France	1R	2R	A	1R	3R	1R	2R	1R	QF	2R	A	1R	1R	3R	8 / 10
Wimbledon	A	A	A	2R	1R	2R	2R	2R	1R	2R	A	2R	1R	A	2 / 10
United States	A	A	A	A	A	A	A	A	A	2R	A	A	A	A	1 / 1
Win–loss	0 / 1	1 / 1	0 / 0	0 / 2	2 / 2	1 / 2	2 / 2	0 / 1	3 / 2	0 / 2	0 / 1	0 / 1	0 / 2	1 / 1	10 / 20
