= Judy Burke =

New Zealand tennis player (1931–2025)

Personal information
- Born: Judith Frances Burke; 21 February 1931 Taranaki, New Zealand
- Died: 16 September 2025 (aged 94) Auckland, New Zealand
- Spouse: Bill Tinnock (died 2017)
- Relative: Peter Burke (brother)
- Tennis career

Grand Slam singles results
- Wimbledon: 3R (1954)

Grand Slam doubles results
- Wimbledon: QF (1954)

Grand Slam mixed doubles results
- Wimbledon: SF (1954)

Judith Frances Tinnock (née Burke; 21 February 1931 – 16 September 2025) was a New Zealand tennis player. She competed at the 1954 Wimbledon Championships, where she reached the third round of the singles, the quarter-finals of the doubles, and the semi-finals of the mixed doubles. Burke died on 16 September 2025, at the age of 94.
