= Kay Hubbell =

American tennis player (1921–2017)

- Full name: Katharine M. Hubbell
- Country (sports): United States
- Born: April 29, 1921
- Died: April 22, 2017 (aged 95)

Singles

Grand Slam singles results
- Wimbledon: 2R (1954, 1955)
- US Open: 3R (1953, 1958)

Doubles

Grand Slam doubles results
- Wimbledon: SF (1954)

Katharine Hubbell (April 29, 1921 – April 22, 2017) was an American tennis player.

Hubbell, originally from Dedham, Massachusetts, trained on grass at the Longwood Club in Boston. Her family had clay courts on their vacation home in Chocorua, New Hampshire, which gave her exposure to another surface. While studying physics at Vassar College she won the national intercollegiate singles and doubles titles every year from 1940 to 1942. She was a women's doubles semi-finalist at the 1954 Wimbledon Championships with Heather Brewer, losing to Louise Brough and Margaret duPont. In 1955 she won the U.S. Women's Indoor Championship singles title.
