= Dorothy Kohl =

American tennis player

Dorothy Levine
- Full name: Dorothy Watman Levine Kohl
- Country (sports): United States
- Born: Chicago, Illinois

Singles

Grand Slam singles results
- French Open: QF (1954)
- Wimbledon: 3R (1954)
- US Open: 3R (1954)

Doubles

Grand Slam doubles results
- French Open: QF (1954)
- Wimbledon: 3R (1954)

Grand Slam mixed doubles results
- Wimbledon: 3R (1954)

Dorothy Watman Levine Kohl is an American former tennis player active in the 1950s.

A native of Chicago, Levine had a national ranking as high as 11 and was a singles quarter-finalist at the 1954 French Championships. She won both the singles and doubles titles at the U.S. Women's Indoor Championships in 1954 and 1957. Her first husband, businessman Orrin Levine, died in 1966. She was remarried in 1968 to Sidney Kohl, a son of the founder of the Kohl's department store chain. In 2012 she was inducted into the USTA Midwest Hall of Fame.
