= Zsuzsa Körmöczy =

Hungarian tennis player (1924–2006)

- Country (sports): Hungary
- Born: 25 August 1924 Budapest, Hungary
- Died: 16 September 2006 (aged 82)
- Plays: Right-handed

Singles
- Highest ranking: No. 2 (1958)

Grand Slam singles results
- French Open: W (1958)
- Wimbledon: SF (1958)

Doubles

Grand Slam doubles results
- French Open: SF (1948)
- Wimbledon: QF (1955)

Mixed doubles

Grand Slam mixed doubles results
- French Open: SF (1947)
- Wimbledon: QF (1947, 1951, 1953)

Zsuzsa Körmöczy (25 August 1924 – 16 September 2006) was a Hungarian tennis player. She reached a career high of World No. 2 in women's tennis, and won the 1958 French Open at the age of 33.

== Early life ==
She was born in Budapest, Hungary, and was Jewish.

== Tennis career ==
In Hungary, as a 16-year-old in 1940 she won the national doubles and mixed doubles titles, and she later won the national singles title six times, and the doubles or mixed doubles trophies 10 times.

According to Lance Tingay of The Daily Telegraph and the Daily Mail, Körmöczy was ranked in the world top 10 in 1953, 1955, 1956, and 1958 and again from 1959 through 1961 (no rankings issued from 1940 through 1945), reaching a career high of World No. 2 in those rankings in 1958 at the age of 34.

She won the singles title at the 1958 French Championships at the age of 33 and reached the semifinals at Wimbledon in 1958. She was named Hungarian Sportswoman of the Year in 1958 after having won the French Championships the same year. She became the first sportswoman granted this award. She won eight of the nine tournaments she entered in 1958, and reached the semi-finals at Wimbledon. In 1959 she made Wimbledon's 'round of eight', finishing sixth, and was the French Open Singles runner-up.

She retired from competition in 1964 to work as a coach for Vasas (the Ironworker Union's Sports Club) and act as the national tennis association's manager. After the fall of communism, she was decorated by new democratic governments in 1994 and 2003.

In 2007, she was inducted posthumously into the International Jewish Sports Hall of Fame.

== Grand Slam finals ==
=== Singles (1 title, 1 runner-up) ===
Result	Year	Championship	Surface	Opponent	Score
Win	1958	French Championships	Clay	(United Kingdom) Shirley Bloomer	6–4, 1–6, 6–2
Lost	1959	French Championships	Clay	(United Kingdom) Christine Truman	4–6, 5–7

== Grand Slam singles tournament timeline ==
Key
W	F	SF	QF	#R	RR	Q#	DNQ	A	NH

(W) winner; (F) finalist; (SF) semifinalist; (QF) quarterfinalist; (#R) rounds 4, 3, 2, 1; (RR) round-robin stage; (Q#) qualification round; (DNQ) did not qualify; (A) absent; (NH) not held; (SR) strike rate (events won / competed); (W–L) win–loss record.

Tournament	1947^{1}	1948	1949 – 1951	1952	1953	1954	1955	1956	1957	1958	1959	1960	1961	1962	1963	1964	Career SR
Australian Championships	A	A	A	A	A	A	A	A	A	A	A	A	A	A	A	A	0 / 0
French Championships	QF	2R	A	A	A	A	1R	SF	QF	W	F	3R	SF	4R	1R	3R	1 / 12
Wimbledon	1R	4R	A	3R	QF	A	QF	4R	2R	SF	A	2R	4R	2R	2R	1R	0 / 13
U.S. Championships	A	A	A	A	A	A	A	A	A	A	A	A	A	A	2R	A	0 / 1
SR	0 / 2	0 / 2	0 / 0	0 / 1	0 / 1	0 / 0	0 / 2	0 / 2	0 / 2	1 / 2	0 / 1	0 / 2	0 / 2	0 / 2	0 / 3	0 / 2	1 / 26

^{1}In 1947, the French Championships were held after Wimbledon.

== See also ==
- Performance timelines for all female tennis players who reached at least one Grand Slam final
- List of select Jewish tennis players

Awards
Preceded by New Award	Hungarian Sportswoman of The Year; 1958	Succeeded by Jenőné Pap
