= Věra Suková =

Czech tennis player (1931–1982)

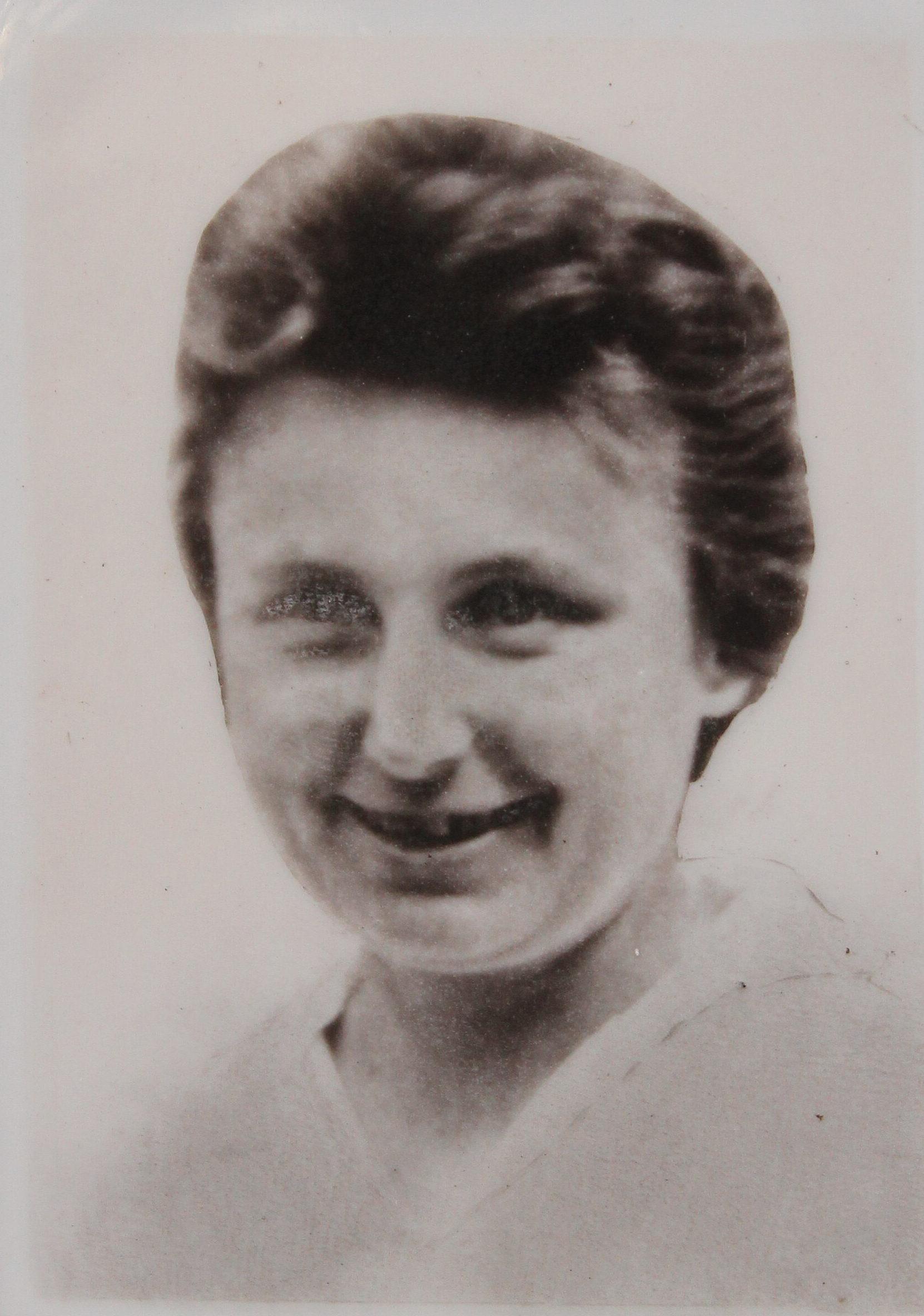
- Full name: Věra Pužejová Suková
- Country (sports): Czechoslovakia
- Born: 13 June 1931 Uherské Hradiště, Czechoslovakia
- Died: 13 May 1982 (aged 50) Prague, Czechoslovakia

Singles
- Highest ranking: No. 5 (1962, Lance Tingay)

Grand Slam singles results
- French Open: SF (1957, 1963)
- Wimbledon: F (1962)
- US Open: QF (1962)

Doubles

Grand Slam doubles results
- Wimbledon: QF (1957, 1960, 1964)

Grand Slam mixed doubles results
- French Open: W (1957)
- Wimbledon: SF (1960, 1961)

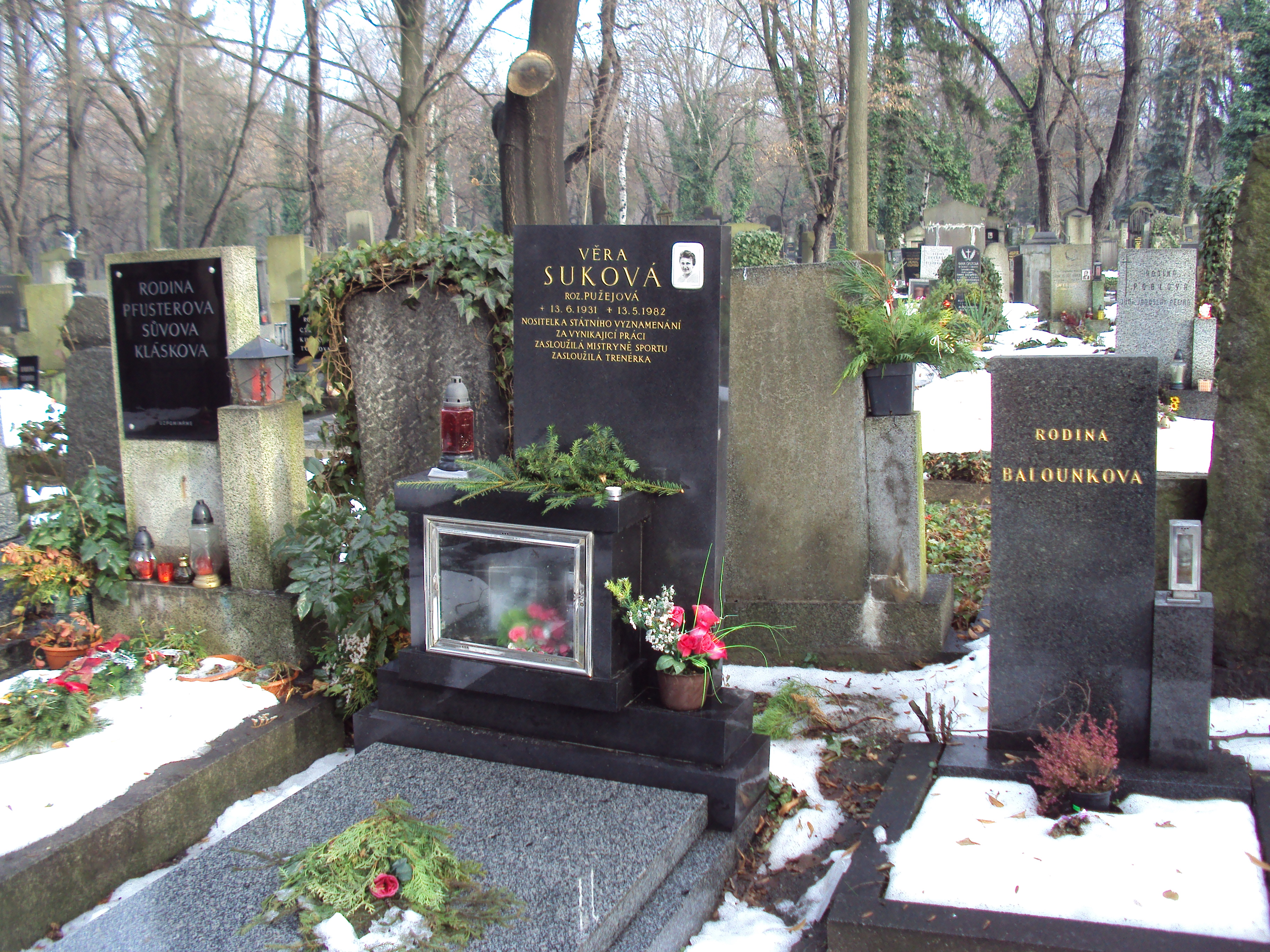
Grave of Věra Suková at Olšany Cemetery in Prague

Věra Suková (née Pužejová; 13 June 1931 – 13 May 1982) was a Czech tennis player. Representing Czechoslovakia, she was the women's singles runner-up at Wimbledon in 1962, losing to Karen Hantze Susman 6–4, 6–4.

Suková was a women's singles semifinalist at the French Championships in 1957 and 1963. She teamed with Jiří Javorský to win the mixed doubles title at that tournament in 1957. They were the runners-up in 1961. According to Lance Tingay, Suková was ranked in the world top 10 in 1957, 1962, and 1963, reaching a career high of World No. 5 in those rankings in 1962.

Suková was the Czechoslovak national women's singles champion 11 times from 1952 to 1964. After retirement from tennis, Suková served as the coach of Czechoslovakia's national women's team. Under her guidance, the team won the Fed Cup in 1975.

== Personal life ==
Her husband Cyril Suk II, whom she married in 1961, was president of the Czechoslovak Tennis Federation. Their two children, Helena Suková (born 1965) and Cyril Suk III (born 1967), both became successful professional tennis players. Věra Suková died from brain cancer in 1982.

== Grand Slam finals ==
=== Singles: 1 (1 runner–up) ===
Result	Year	Championship	Surface	Opponent	Score
Loss	1962	Wimbledon Championships	Grass	(United States) Karen Susman	4–6, 4–6

=== Mixed doubles: 2 (1 title, 1 runner-up) ===
Result	Year	Championship	Surface	Partner	Opponents	Score
Win	1957	French Championships	Clay	(Czechoslovakia) Jiří Javorský	(West Germany) Edda Buding (Chile) Luis Ayala	6–3, 6–4
Loss	1961	French Championships	Clay	(Czechoslovakia) Jiří Javorský	(United States) Darlene Hard (Australia) Rod Laver	0–6, 6–2, 3–6

== Grand Slam singles tournament timeline ==
Key
W	F	SF	QF	#R	RR	Q#	DNQ	A	NH

(W) winner; (F) finalist; (SF) semifinalist; (QF) quarterfinalist; (#R) rounds 4, 3, 2, 1; (RR) round-robin stage; (Q#) qualification round; (DNQ) did not qualify; (A) absent; (NH) not held; (SR) strike rate (events won / competed); (W–L) win–loss record.

Tournament	1956	1957	1958	1959	1960	1961	1962	1963	1964	Career SR
Australian Championships	A	A	A	A	A	A	A	A	A	0 / 0
French Championships	2R	SF	4R	QF	QF	4R	3R	SF	QF	0 / 9
Wimbledon	4R	3R	A	3R	4R	QF	F	3R	2R	0 / 8
U.S. Championships	A	A	A	A	A	A	QF	4R	A	0 / 2
SR	0 / 2	0 / 2	0 / 1	0 / 2	0 / 2	0 / 2	0 / 3	0 / 3	0 / 2	0 / 19

== See also ==
- Performance timelines for all female tennis players who reached at least one Grand Slam final
