= Almut Sturm =

German tennis player

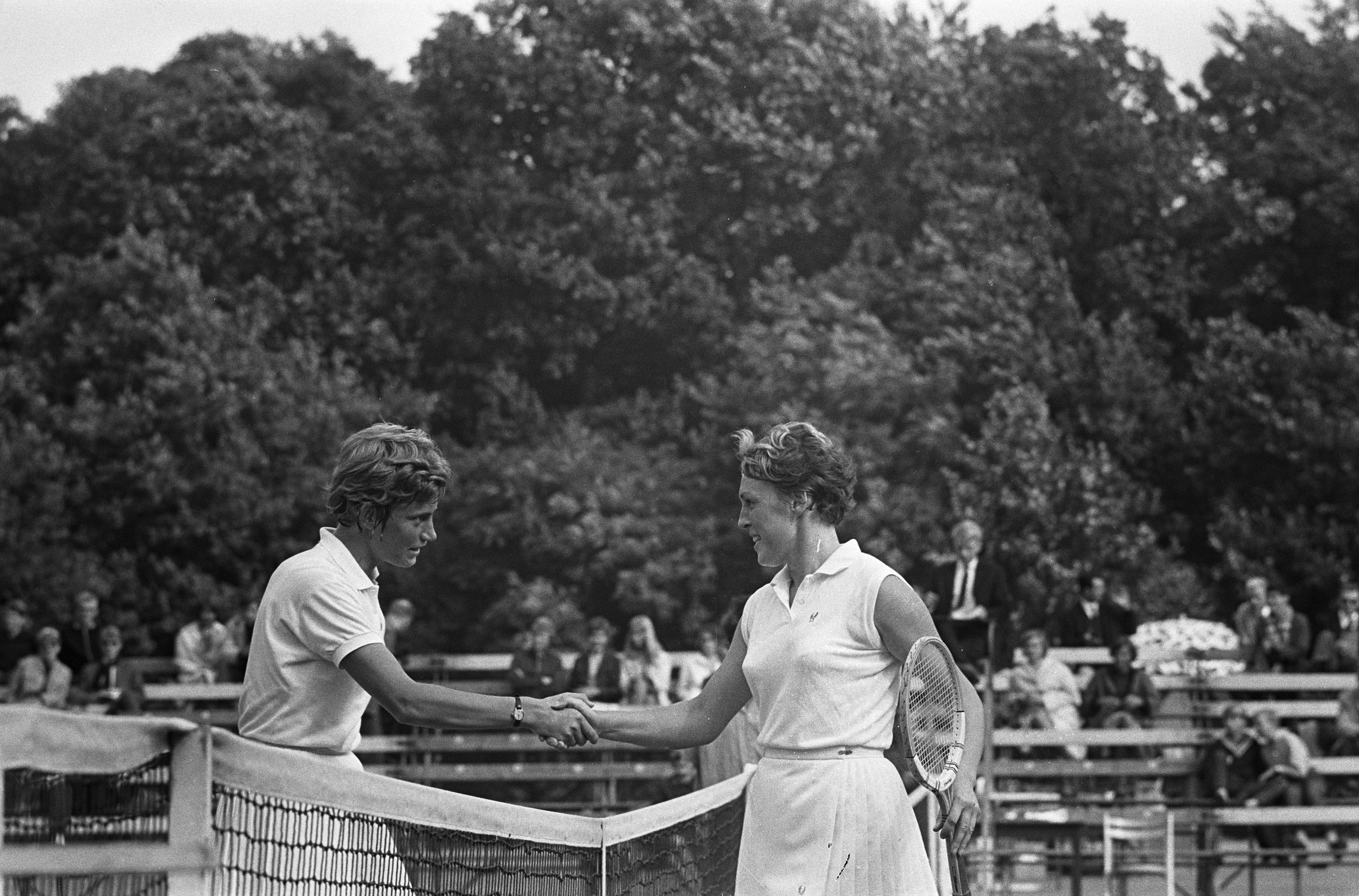
- Sturm (right) in 1965
- Country (sports): West Germany
- Born: 7 April 1941 (age 83)

Singles

Grand Slam singles results
- French Open: 2R (1964, 1965)
- Wimbledon: 3R (1962)
- US Open: 1R (1963)

Almut Sturm (born 7 April 1941), known as Almut Gfroerer after marriage, is a German former tennis player.

Sturm, national singles champion in 1963, was a member of West Germany's 1969 Federation Cup team, featuring in two singles rubbers. She had a win over Canada's Andrée Martin, then was beaten by Winnie Shaw in West Germany's quarter-final loss to Great Britain.

During the 1960s she won several titles on tour, including in Israel and Nice.
