= Betsy Abbas =

Egyptian tennis player

- Country (sports): South Africa; Egypt

Singles

Grand Slam singles results
- French Open: QF (1960)
- Wimbledon: 3R (1954)

Doubles

Grand Slam doubles results
- French Open: 2R (1954, 1959, 1961)
- Wimbledon: 3R (1952)

Grand Slam mixed doubles results
- French Open: 3R (1954)
- Wimbledon: 4R (1952)

Beatrice "Betsy" Abbas (née Venter born 1930s) is a UK-born Egyptian former tennis player who also represented South Africa.

She played in singles in the 1960 French Championships. She lost to Mexican player Yola Ramírez in the quarterfinals.

She played in singles at the Wimbledon in 1952. She lost to the British Pat Harrison in the second round. Her partner in women's doubles, British Doreen Spiers, lost in the third round to British players Molly Blair and Mary Halford. Her partner in mixed doubles, Władysław Skonecki, lost in the fourth round to Australian player Lew Hoad and American Dorothy Head Knode.

In 1954 Wimbledon she lost to American Margaret Osborne duPont in the third round.

== Career finals ==
=== Singles (7–3) ===
Result	No.	Year	Location	Surface	Opponent	Score
Loss	1	March 1947	Cairo, Egypt	Clay	(United Kingdom) Billie Yorke	6–1, 2–6, 3–6
Win	1.	March 1952	Cairo, Egypt	Clay	(France) Simonne Mathieu	6–1, 6–4
Win	2.	November 1953	Maadi, Egypt	Clay	(United Kingdom) Esther Saul	6–1, 6–1
Win	3.	December 1953	Heliopolis, Egypt	Clay	(United Kingdom) Esther Saul	6–2, 6–2
Win	4.	February 1954	Cairo, Egypt	Clay	(United Kingdom) Esther Saul	6–0, 6–2
Loss	2	March 1954	Cairo, Egypt	Clay	(West Germany) Totte Zehden	3–6, 3–6
Win	5.	March 1954	Alexandria, Egypt	Clay	(West Germany) Totte Zehden	4–6, 6–2, 6–3
Loss	3.	June 1954	Torquay, United Kingdom	Hard	(United Kingdom) Patricia Ward Hales	0–6, 3–6
Win	6.	November 1954	Cairo, Egypt	Clay	(Greece) Xantippe Vassiliadou	6–2, 6–1
Win	7.	March 1956	Heliopolis, Egypt	Clay	(Egypt) Esther Saul	2–6, 6–4, 6–1

=== Doubles (11–7) ===
Result	No.	Year	location	Surface	Partner	Opponents	Score
Loss	1.	March 1947	Alexandria, Egypt	Clay	(Italy) Annalisa Bossi	(France) Suzanne Pannetier (United Kingdom) Billie Yorke	1–6, 4–6
Loss	2.	September 1949	Athens, Greece	Clay	(Egypt) Georgina Greiss	(United Kingdom) John Curry (United Kingdom) Peggy Dawson-Scott	0–6, 3–6
Loss	3.	March 1952	Cairo, Egypt	Clay	(Egypt) Georgina Greiss	(United States) Shirley Fry (United States) Doris Hart	6–8, 4–6
Loss	4.	February 1953	Cairo, Egypt	Clay	(Egypt) Georgina Greiss	(United States) Dorothy Head Knode (France) Maud Galtier	4–6, 7–9
Loss	5.	March 1953	Alexandria, Egypt	Clay	(United Kingdom) Patricia Ward Hales	(United States) Dorothy Head Knode (France) Maud Galtier	7–9, 3–6
Win	1.	November 1953	Maadi, Egypt	Clay	(Egypt) Georgina Greiss	(United Kingdom) Esther Saul (United Kingdom) Ingrid Smith	6–0, 2–6, 6–2
Win	2.	December 1953	Heliopolis, Egypt	Clay	(Egypt) Georgina Greiss	(United Kingdom) Esther Saul (United Kingdom) Ingrid Smith	6–4, 6–2
Win	3.	February 1954	Cairo, Egypt	Clay	(Egypt) Andree Eid	(United Kingdom) Esther Saul (Greece) Xenia Vassiliadis	6–4, 6–3
Win	4.	March 1954	Cairo, Egypt	Clay	(United Kingdom) Patricia Ward Hales	(West Germany) Totte Zehden (United States) Mary Kay Morris	6–0, 6–3
Win	5.	March 1954	Alexandria, Egypt	Clay	(United Kingdom) Patricia Ward Hales	(West Germany) Totte Zehden (United States) Mary Kay Morris	6–2, 6–2
Win	6.	June 1954	Torquay, United Kingdom	Hard	(United Kingdom) Patricia Ward Hales	(United States) Barbara Bradley (United States) Barbara Kimbrell	2–6, 6–2, 7–5
Win	7.	November 1954	Cairo, Egypt	Clay	(Egypt) Andree Eid	(Egypt) Rona Hamdy (United States) Evelyn Houseman	6–3, 6–2
Win	8.	March 1956	Cairo, Egypt	Clay	(United States) Althea Gibson	(United Kingdom) Angela Mortimer (Australia) Jenny Staley Hoad	6–3, 7–5
Win	9.	March 1956	Alexandria, Egypt	Clay	(United States) Althea Gibson	(United Kingdom) Angela Mortimer (Australia) Jenny Staley Hoad	6–3, 6–1
Loss	6.	September 1959	Paris, France	Clay	(France) Ginette Bucaille	(France) Monique Coste (France) Maud Galtier	1–6, 2–6
Win	10.	September 1961	Paris, France	Clay	(France) Maud Galtier	(France) Florence de la Courtie-Billat (France) Anne-Marie Seghers	5–7, 6–3, 0–6
Loss	7.	October 1961	Cannes, France	Clay	(France) Maud Galtier	(France) Florence de la Courtie-Billat (France) Françoise Dürr	2–6, 1–6
Win	11.	July 1962	Paris, France	Clay	(France) Irene de Lanslut	(France) Henriette Siarry (France) Claudine Pierval	4–6, 6–2, 6–4
