= Baba Lewis =

American tennis player

- Full name: Mercedes Johnson Lewis (nee Madden)
- Country (sports): United States
- Born: April 27, 1920
- Died: September 23, 1998 (aged 78)
- Height: 5 ft 2 in (157 cm)
- Plays: Right-handed

Grand Slam singles results
- French Open: 3R (1954)
- Wimbledon: 4R (1953)
- US Open: QF (1952)

Grand Slam doubles results
- French Open: QF (1954)

Mercedes Johnson Madden "Baba" Lewis (April 27, 1920 — September 23, 1998) was an American tennis player.

Lewis, a quick and nimble player, was a native of Massachusetts who was active on tour in the 1940s and 1950s. She twice won the singles title at the Canadian Championships, including in 1946 when her then husband Morey Lewis was champion in the men's singles. In 1952 she made the singles quarter-finals of the U.S. National Championships, losing to Shirley Fry. She attained her top national ranking of eight in 1952. In addition to tennis she was also nationally ranked in the sport of squash and was the top ranked player in New England for several years.
