= Nicla Migliori =

Italian tennis player (1923–2008)

- Country (sports): Italy
- Born: 30 April 1923 Pisa, Italy
- Died: 25 July 2008 (aged 85)
- Plays: Right-handed

Singles

Grand Slam singles results
- French Open: 3R (1949, 1951)
- Wimbledon: 4R (1954)

Doubles

Grand Slam doubles results
- French Open: SF (1953)
- Wimbledon: QF (1954)

Grand Slam mixed doubles results
- French Open: 3R (1953)
- Wimbledon: 3R (1955)

Nicla Migliori (born Artigiani; 30 April 1923 — 25 July 2008) was an Italian tennis player.

Born in Pisa, Migliori was one of Italy's top players of the 1950s. She won 17 national titles, which included singles triumphs in 1951 and 1955. Against international opponents at the Internazionali d' Italia she made the singles semi-finals twice and one doubles final. Known for her abilities at the net, she was a women's doubles semi-finalist at the 1953 French Championships with Silvana Lazzarino. She reached the singles fourth round at Wimbledon in 1954.

From 1968 to 1975 she was non-playing captain of the Italy Federation Cup team.
