= 1964 French Championships (tennis) =

- Date: 19–30 May 1964
- Edition: 63
- Category: 34th Grand Slam (ITF)
- Surface: Clay
- Location: Paris (XVI^{e}), France
- Venue: Stade Roland Garros

Champions

Men's singles
- (Spain) Manuel Santana

Women's singles
- (Australia) Margaret Smith

Men's doubles
- (Australia) Roy Emerson / (Australia) Ken Fletcher

Women's doubles
- (Australia) Margaret Smith / (Australia) Lesley Turner

Mixed doubles
- (Australia) Margaret Smith / (Australia) Ken Fletcher
- French Championships

The 1964 French Championships (now known as the French Open) was a tennis tournament that took place on the outdoor clay courts at the Stade Roland-Garros in Paris, France. The tournament ran from 19 May until 30 May. It was the 63rd staging of the French Championships, and the second Grand Slam tennis event of 1964. Manuel Santana and Margaret Smith won the singles titles.

== Finals ==
=== Men's singles ===
(Spain) Manuel Santana defeated (Italy) Nicola Pietrangeli 6–3, 6–1, 4–6, 7–5

=== Women's singles ===
(Australia) Margaret Smith defeated (Brazil) Maria Bueno 5–7, 6–1, 6–2

=== Men's doubles ===
(Australia) Roy Emerson / (Australia) Ken Fletcher defeated (Australia) John Newcombe / (Australia) Tony Roche 7–5, 6–3, 3–6, 7–5

=== Women's doubles ===
(Australia) Margaret Smith / (Australia) Lesley Turner defeated (Argentina) Norma Baylon / (West Germany) Helga Schultze 6–3, 6–1

=== Mixed doubles ===
(Australia) Margaret Smith / (Australia) Ken Fletcher defeated (Australia) Lesley Turner / (Australia) Fred Stolle 6–3, 4–6, 8–6

Preceded by 1964 Australian Championships	Grand Slams	Succeeded by 1964 Wimbledon Championships
