= Melita Ramírez =

Mexican tennis player (1930–2016)

- Full name: Imelda Ramírez
- Country (sports): Mexico
- Born: 29 November 1930
- Died: 13 August 2016 (aged 85)
- Plays: Right-handed
Medal record
Pan American Games
| Gold medal – first place | 1951 Buenos Aires | Mixed doubles |
| Silver medal – second place | 1951 Buenos Aires | Women's doubles |
| Bronze medal – third place | 1959 Chicago | Women's doubles |
| Bronze medal – third place | 1951 Buenos Aires | Women's singles |
Central American and Caribbean Games
| Gold medal – first place | 1950 Guatemala City | Mixed doubles |
| Gold medal – first place | 1954 Mexico City | Women's singles |
| Gold medal – first place | 1954 Mexico City | Women's doubles |
| Gold medal – first place | 1954 Mexico City | Mixed doubles |
| Silver medal – second place | 1950 Guatemala City | Women's singles |
| Silver medal – second place | 1959 Caracas | Women's singles |

Imelda "Melita" Ramírez (29 November 1930 – 13 August 2016) was a Mexican tennis player.

Ramírez, the 1948 Orange Bowl champion, was active on the international tour during the 1950s. She was regarded as Mexico's best women's player until the emergence of her younger sister Yolanda "Yola" Ramírez, who twice won the French Championships in doubles.

Her achievements include winning a gold medal for mixed doubles at the 1951 Pan American Games and a further four gold medals for Mexico at the Central American and Caribbean Games. In 1952 and 1953 she claimed back to back titles at the Canadian Championships. She was the first Mexican to compete in a ladies draw at Wimbledon and reached the women's doubles quarterfinals of the 1954 French Championships.
