= Angela Buxton =

British tennis player (1934–2020)

- Angela Buxton in 1955, when she was ranked among the top 10 female players in the world.
- Country (sports): United Kingdom
- Born: 16 August 1934 Liverpool, Lancashire, England
- Died: 14 August 2020 (aged 85) Fort Lauderdale, Florida, U.S.
- Retired: 1957

Grand Slam singles results
- French Open: QF (1954)
- Wimbledon: F (1956)

Grand Slam doubles results
- French Open: W (1956)
- Wimbledon: W (1956)

Grand Slam mixed doubles results
- French Open: 3R (1956)
Medal record
Representing England
Maccabiah Games
Gold medal – first place	1953 Israel	Women's Singles

Angela Buxton (16 August 1934 – 14 August 2020) was a British tennis player. She won the women's doubles title at both the French Championships and Wimbledon in 1956 with her playing partner, Althea Gibson.

== Early life ==
Buxton was born in Liverpool on 16 August 1934, one of two children born to Harry and Violet (Greenberg) Buxton. Her grandparents on both sides were Jewish and had emigrated to England from Russia, fleeing the pogroms in the early 1900s. She was raised partly in South Africa. Buxton's father owned a successful cinema chain in northwestern England, which allowed her to attend boarding school at Gloddaeth Hall. While there, a coach noticed her tennis ability and urged her to acquire more training.

== Career ==
Buxton began playing tennis at a young age. After spending time undergoing training in London and Los Angeles, in 1954 she earned the British No. 4 ranking. Buxton then reached the 1955 Wimbledon singles quarterfinals and climbed to World No. 9 in the rankings. She played in Wightman Cup competition for the United Kingdom in 1954, 1955, and 1956.

Buxton had her most successful tennis year in 1956. She won the women's doubles title and reached the singles final at Wimbledon, the first Briton to do so in 17 years. She won the English Indoor and London Grass Court singles championships and the English Hard Court doubles crown (with Darlene Hard). At the French Championships, she reached the singles semifinals and won the women's doubles title with Althea Gibson, who was the first African-American champion. Buxton was ranked World No. 5 by World Tennis and World No. 6 by Lance Tingay.

Buxton also won the women's singles title at the 1953 Maccabiah Games in Israel.

After suffering a serious hand condition in late 1956 (tenosynovitis), Buxton was forced to retire following the 1957 season at the age of 22.

Buxton's Judaism played a role throughout her career. Her religious background prevented full acceptance within the tennis world from an early age. Regarding her experience at the Cumberland, an elite lawn tennis club in London, she said:

I had to fill in a form: name, address, telephone number and then religion. I had several lessons there with a guy called Bill Blake, and I kept asking him about membership. Eventually he turned round to me and said "Look, Angela, please don't keep asking me, you're not going to be able to join the club." I said "Why not? I'm not good enough?" "No, because you're Jewish." And that was the beginning. It was the first time it [prejudice] had hit me in this country.

Buxton repeatedly was refused access to training facilities because of her ethnicity. From the mid-1950s, she was able to practise at the private indoor court of Simon Marks, the Jewish owner of department store chain Marks and Spencer, who had become aware of the difficulties which Buxton faced.

After Buxton won the women's doubles title at Wimbledon with an African-American partner Althea Gibson, one English newspaper reported the event with a story titled "Minorities Win". "It was in very small type", said Buxton, "lest anyone should see it". Contradictory information surrounds the issue why Buxton was never a member of the All England Lawn Tennis & Croquet Club in Wimbledon. In one interview she recalled that she herself had refused an offer of honorary membership to the club, whereas in another she stated she had not refused it. She was a guest of the club at the Championships in 2014 with seating in the Royal Box. On another occasion, Buxton claimed the reason for not being a member of the club was antisemitic prejudice. Buxton said in 2004: "I think the anti-Semitism is still there. The mere fact that I'm not a member is a full sentence that speaks for itself." The chairman of the club said he could not comment until he investigated further and it was reported in 2019 that the club explained that membership was a private matter and strongly refuted that race or religion play a factor.

In 2009, Buxton remarked that "I wish [tennis] still wasn't such an elite sport", Buxton said. "I wish we could bring it down to a common baseline. It's going that way. It's still not there."

== Later life and legacy ==
Buxton was inducted into the International Jewish Sports Hall of Fame in 1981. In 2014, she was inducted into the National Jewish Sports Hall of Fame. In 2015, the Black Tennis Hall of Fame inducted Buxton, honoring her for her doubles partnership and friendship with Althea Gibson as well as her efforts to raise funds for the ailing Gibson near the end of her life.

Buxton wrote the tennis books Tackle Lawn Tennis This Way (1958), Starting Tennis (1975), and Winning Tennis: Doubles Tactics (1980).

Buxton founded the Angela Buxton Tennis Centre in Hampstead Garden Suburb. In later years, she divided her time between Altrincham and Florida, where she kept a winter home and regularly attended tournaments and mentored players. She died on 14 August 2020, two days short of her 86th birthday, at her home in Fort Lauderdale.

== Grand Slam finals ==
=== Singles (1 runner-up) ===
Result	Year	Championship	Surface	Opponent	Score	Ref.
Loss	1956	Wimbledon	Grass	(United States) Shirley Fry	3–6, 1–6	

=== Doubles (2 titles) ===
Result	Year	Championship	Surface	Partner	Opponents	Score	Ref.
Win	1956	French Championships	Clay	(United States) Althea Gibson	(United States) Darlene Hard (United States) Dorothy Head Knode	6–8, 8–6, 6–1	
Win	1956	Wimbledon	Grass	(United States) Althea Gibson	(Australia) Fay Muller (Australia) Daphne Seeney	6–1, 8–6	

== Grand Slam singles tournament timeline ==
Key
W	F	SF	QF	#R	RR	Q#	DNQ	A	NH

(W) winner; (F) finalist; (SF) semifinalist; (QF) quarterfinalist; (#R) rounds 4, 3, 2, 1; (RR) round-robin stage; (Q#) qualification round; (DNQ) did not qualify; (A) absent; (NH) not held; (SR) strike rate (events won / competed); (W–L) win–loss record.

Tournament	1952	1953	1954	1955	1956	Career SR
Australian Championships	A	A	A	A	A	0 / 0
French Championships	A	A	QF	3R	SF	0 / 3
Wimbledon	1R	4R	4R	QF	F	0 / 5
U.S. Championships	A	A	A	3R	A	0 / 1
SR	0 / 1	0 / 1	0 / 2	0 / 3	0 / 2	0 / 9

== See also ==
- List of select Jewish tennis players
- List of British Jewish sportspeople
- Performance timelines for all female tennis players since 1978 who reached at least one Grand Slam final
