= Heather Brewer-Segal =

Heather Segal
- Country (sports): Bermuda; South Africa
- Born: 25 July 1931; Lancashire, England
- Died: 2006 (aged 74); Spain
- Plays: Left-handed

Singles

Grand Slam singles results
- French Open: SF (1955, 1958)
- Wimbledon: 4R (1953, 1955, 1957)
- US Open: 3R (1956)

Doubles

Grand Slam doubles results
- French Open: 3R (1966)
- Wimbledon: SF (1954)

Grand Slam mixed doubles results
- French Open: QF (1958)
- Wimbledon: QF (1957)

Heather Mary Hope Brewer-Segal (1931–2006), born Heather Nicholls, was a Bermudian tennis player.

== Career ==
Born in Lancashire, Brewer-Segal grew up on the island of Bermuda. She attended Rollins College in Florida, where she played varsity tennis, before competing on the international circuit through the 1950s and 1960s.

Brewer-Segal, a left-handed player, made the singles semi-finals at the French Championships in both 1955 and 1958, while her best Wimbledon performance was a doubles semi-final appearance in 1954. She twice won the singles title at the South African Championships and was runner-up once. In 1957 she also won the Swiss International Championships at Gstaad. In 1958 she won the Italian Riviera Championships in Sanremo on clay against Mexico's Rosie Reyes. In 1960 she won the Trofeo Conde de Godó (known today as the Barcelona Open) on clay against Pilar Barril.

== Personal life ==
Brewer-Segal had marriages to William Jefferson Brewer (1952) and South African tennis player Abe Segal (1957), which both ended in divorces. During her marriage to Segal she represented her husband's native country.
