= Helga Schultze =

German tennis player

- Country (sports): West Germany
- Born: 2 February 1940 Berlin, Germany
- Died: 12 September 2015 (aged 75)
- Retired: 1975

Singles
- Highest ranking: No. 5 (1964)

Grand Slam singles results
- French Open: SF (1964)
- Wimbledon: 4R (1962)
- US Open: 3R (1962, 1964)

Grand Slam doubles results
- French Open: F (1964)
- Wimbledon: SF (1975)

Grand Slam mixed doubles results
- French Open: QF (1966)
- Wimbledon: 3R (1966)

Team competitions
- Fed Cup: F (1966, 1970)

Helga Schultze (2 February 1940 – 12 September 2015), also known by her married name Helga Hösl, was a German female tennis player who reached a singles ranking of No. 5 in 1964.

Schultze was born in Berlin on 2 February 1940, and after World War II, she moved with her family to Hanau, where she played for the local club THC Hanau.

From 1961 to 1968, she competed in seven Wimbledon Championships. She achieved her best singles result at Wimbledon in 1962 when she reached the fourth round, losing to second-seeded Darlene Hard. She reached the semifinals at the 1964 French Championships, where she lost in three sets to top-seeded and eventual champion Margaret Smith. At the U.S. Championships, she reached the third round in 1962 and 1964.

In 1964, Schultz and her teammate Norma Baylon reached the doubles final at the 1964 French Championships, losing to Margaret Smith and Lesley Turner.

From 1964 to 1974, she participated in the German Fed Cup team and compiled a 14–11 win–loss record.

In 1970, she received the Silbernes Lorbeerblatt (Silver Laurel Leaf), the highest sports award in Germany.

After her tennis career, she wrote several books on tennis and nutrition.

== Grand Slam finals ==
=== Doubles (1 runner-up) ===
Result	Year	Championship	Surface	Partner	Opponents	Score
Loss	1964	French Championships	Clay	(Argentina) Norma Baylon	(Australia) Margaret Smith (Australia) Lesley Turner	3–6, 1–6
