= Silvana Lazzarino =

Italian tennis player

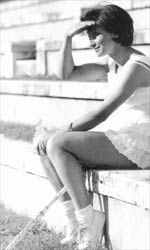
- Country (sports): Italy
- Born: 19 May 1933 (age 91); Rome, Italy

Singles

Grand Slam singles results
- French Open: SF (1954)
- Wimbledon: 3R (1960)
- US Open: 3R (1954)

Doubles

Grand Slam doubles results
- French Open: SF (1953, 1957, 1964)
- Wimbledon: QF (1954, 1960)

Silvana Lazzarino (19 May 1933) is a former female tennis player from Italy. She reached the semifinals at 1954 French Championships. In doubles, she reached the French semifinals in 1953, 1957 and 1964. Her best results at Wimbledon was reaching the third round in singles in 1960 and the quarterfinals in doubles in 1954 and 1960.

She and partner Lea Pericoli reached five women's doubles finals in six years (1962-1965, 1967) at the Italian International Championships.

== See also ==
- Best result of an Italian tennis player in Grand Slam
