= Erika Vollmer =

German tennis player (1925–2021)

- Country (sports): Germany
- Residence: Germany
- Born: 23 February 1925 Graz, Austria
- Died: 25 July 2021 (aged 96)

Singles
- Career titles: 0 WTA

Grand Slam singles results
- Wimbledon: QF (1953)

Doubles
- Career titles: 0 WTA

Grand Slam doubles results
- Wimbledon: QF (1954, 1957)

Grand Slam mixed doubles results
- Wimbledon: QF (1955, 1956)

Erika Vollmer (née Obst; 23 February 1925 - 25 July 2021) was a German professional female tennis player who lost the final of Italian Championships singles title to British player Patricia Ward by 4–6, 3–6 in 1955.

She won the German national singles title in 1952, 1954, 1955, 1957 and 1959. Vollmer was the No.1 ranked German player in 1952 and 1955.

From 1953 to 1959, she competed in seven consecutive editions of the Wimbledon Championships, and she achieved her best singles result in 1953 when she reached the quarterfinals, losing in two sets to first-seeded and eventual champion Maureen Connolly.

In 1947, she married doctor Johannes Vollmer. In 1956, she received the Silbernes Lorbeerblatt (Silver Laurel Leaf), the highest sports award in Germany. Vollmer died in the summer of 2021.

== Career finals ==
=== Singles: 1 (1 runner-up) ===
Result	Date	Tournament	Surface	Opponent	Score
Loss	May 1955	Italian Championships, Italy	Clay	(United Kingdom) Patricia Ward	4–6, 3–6
