= Jacqueline Kermina =

Frensh tennis player (1927–1995)

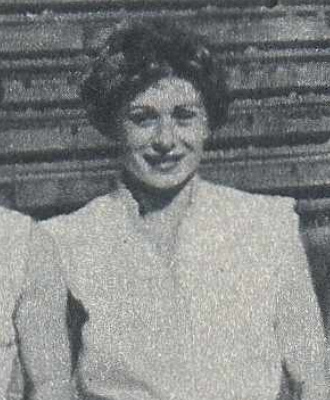
- Country (sports): France
- Born: 30 June 1927; Paris, France
- Died: 21 August 1995 (aged 68); Paris, France

Singles

Grand Slam singles results
- French Open: 3R (1954, 1966)
- Wimbledon: 2R (1952, 1954)

Doubles

Grand Slam doubles results
- French Open: QF (1953, 1954)
- Wimbledon: 3R (1954)

Grand Slam mixed doubles results
- French Open: SF (1954)
- Wimbledon: 1R (1954)

Jacqueline Jeanne Victorine Kermina (30 June 1927 – 21 August 1995) was a French tennis player and coach.

Born in Paris, Kermina was active as a player in the 1950s and 1960s. She reached the singles third round of the French Championships twice and was a mixed doubles semi-finalist in 1954, with Mervyn Rose.

Kermina had a long association with the France Federation Cup team as a coach, serving three stints as captain. She first led the side in 1969 and 1970, then from 1973 to 1975, before returning for one final campaign in 1977.
