= 1954 French Championships (tennis) =

- Date: 18 May – 30 May 1954
- Edition: 53
- Category: 24th Grand Slam (ITF)
- Surface: Clay
- Location: Paris (XVI^{e}), France
- Venue: Stade Roland Garros

Champions

Men's singles
- (United States) Tony Trabert

Women's singles
- (United States) Maureen Connolly

Men's doubles
- (United States) Vic Seixas / (United States) Tony Trabert

Women's doubles
- (United States) Maureen Connolly / (Australia) Nell Hall Hopman

Mixed doubles
- (United States) Maureen Connolly / (Australia) Lew Hoad
- French Championships

The 1954 French Championships (now known as the French Open) was a tennis tournament that took place on the outdoor clay courts at the Stade Roland-Garros in Paris, France. The tournament ran from 18 May until 30 May. It was the 58th staging of the French Championships, and the second Grand Slam tennis event of 1954. Tony Trabert and Maureen Connolly won the singles titles.

== Finals ==
=== Men's singles ===
(United States) Tony Trabert defeated (United States) Art Larsen 6–4, 7–5, 6–1

=== Women's singles ===
(United States) Maureen Connolly defeated (France) Ginette Bucaille 6–4, 6–1

=== Men's doubles ===
(United States) Vic Seixas / (United States) Tony Trabert defeated (Australia) Lew Hoad / (Australia) Ken Rosewall 6–4, 6–2, 6–1

=== Women's doubles ===
(United States) Maureen Connolly / (Australia) Nell Hall Hopman defeated (France) Maud Galtier / (France) Suzanne Schmitt 7–5, 4–6, 6–0

=== Mixed doubles ===
(United States) Maureen Connolly / (Australia) Lew Hoad defeated (France) Jacqueline Patorni / (Australia) Rex Hartwig 6–4, 6–3

Preceded by 1954 Australian Championships	Grand Slams	Succeeded by 1954 Wimbledon Championships
