= Maud Galtier =

French tennis player (1913–2014)

- Country (sports): France
- Born: 21 April 1913
- Died: 7 April 2014 (aged 100)
- Plays: Right-handed

Singles

Grand Slam singles results
- French Open: 3R (1954, 1961, 1964)
- Wimbledon: 2R (1958)

Doubles

Grand Slam doubles results
- French Open: F (1954)
- Wimbledon: 1R (1950, 1958)

Grand Slam mixed doubles results
- French Open: QF (1954, 1956)
- Wimbledon: 2R (1950)

Maud Galtier (21 April 1913 — 7 April 2014) was a French tennis player.

== Biography ==
Galtier, a native of Toulon, began competing in the 1940s and was originally known by her maiden name Maud Mottez. She won France's national singles championship title in 1954 and was a two-time winner of the French Covered Court Championships. Partnering Suzanne Schmitt, she made the women's doubles final of the 1954 French Championships, which they lost in three sets to Maureen Connolly and Nell Hall Hopman. Her vision was limited during the match as she had sat on her glasses on a changeover. Galtier, who used an underarm serve, continued to play at the French Championships into the 1960s after she had become a grandmother. She lived to 100.

== Grand Slam tournament finals ==
=== Doubles: 1 (1 runner-up) ===
Result	Year	Championship	Surface	Partner	Opponents	Score
Loss	1954	French Championships	Clay	(France) Suzanne Schmitt	(United States) Maureen Connolly (Australia) Nell Hall Hopman	5–7, 6–4, 0–6
