= Ginette Bucaille =

French tennis player (1926–2021)

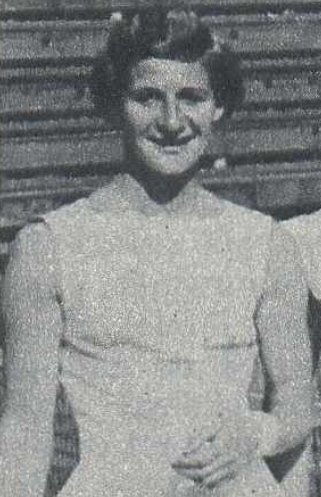
- Full name: Ginette Bucaille Jucker
- Country (sports): France
- Born: 25 January 1926
- Died: 19 January 2021 (aged 94)

Singles
- Highest ranking: No.10 (1954)

Grand Slam singles results
- French Open: F (1954)
- Wimbledon: 3R (1950, 1954)

Doubles

Grand Slam doubles results
- Wimbledon: 3R (1954, 1956)

Grand Slam mixed doubles results
- Wimbledon: 4R (1954, 1955)

Ginette Bucaille (née Jucker; 25 January 1926 – 19 January 2021) was a tennis player from France. She reached the singles final at the 1954 French Championships in which she was defeated by Maureen Connolly in straight sets. She reached the quarterfinals in 1953 and 1955. Bucaille reached the third round of the singles event at the Wimbledon Championships in 1950 and 1954. In the doubles event she reached the third round in 1954 and 1956 and in the mixed doubles she made it to the fourth round in 1954 with Neale Fraser and in 1955 with Jean Borotra.

In July 1954, Bucaille met Connolly in the finals at the Irish Championships in Dublin, and again Connolly won in straight sets. With compatriot Nelly Adamson she reached the doubles finals of the 1954 Italian Championships.

In April 1955 she won the singles title at the International Championships of Paris.

Bucaille was jointly ranked No. 1 in France in 1955 and achieved her highest world ranking of No. 10 in 1954.

== Grand Slam finals ==
=== Singles (1 runner-up) ===
Result	Year	Championship	Surface	Opponent	Score
Loss	1954	French Championships	Clay	(United States) Maureen Connolly	4–6, 1–6

== See also ==
- Performance timelines for all female tennis players since 1978 who reached at least one Grand Slam final
