= Suzanne Schmitt =

French tennis player

- Country (sports): France
- Born: 18 October 1928
- Died: 27 October 2019 (aged 91)
- Plays: Right-handed

Singles

Grand Slam singles results
- French Open: 3R (1954, 1956, 1958)
- Wimbledon: 3R (1951)

Doubles

Grand Slam doubles results
- French Open: F (1954)
- Wimbledon: QF (1955)

Grand Slam mixed doubles results
- French Open: 3R (1956, 1958)
- Wimbledon: 4R (1957)

Suzanne Josette Marguerite Schmitt (18 October 1928 — 27 October 2019) was a French tennis player.

Schmitt was active on tour in the 1950s and 1960s. She made the women's doubles final of the 1954 French Championships, where she and Maud Galtier lost in three sets to Maureen Connolly and Nell Hall Hopman. In 1955 she was a women's doubles quarter-finalist at Wimbledon. She began competing under her husband's name in the mid-1950s after marrying French engineer Denys Le Besnerais. She was distantly related to tennis player Nanette le Besnerais as Denys was the nephew of Jean-Richard Le Besnerais, husband of Anne-Marie "Nanette" Carbonel-Tequi.

== Grand Slam tournament finals ==
=== Doubles: 1 (1 runner-up) ===
Result	Year	Championship	Surface	Partner	Opponents	Score
Loss	1954	French Championships	Clay	(France) Maud Galtier	(United States) Maureen Connolly (Australia) Nell Hall Hopman	5–7, 6–4, 0–6
