= Christiane Mercelis =

Belgian tennis player (1931–2024)

- Country (sports): Belgium
- Born: 5 October 1931; Belgium
- Died: 14 June 2024 (aged 92)

Singles
- Career record: 281–165
- Career titles: 47

Grand Slam singles results
- French Open: QF (1957)
- Wimbledon: 4R (1954, 1955, 1958)
- Career record: no value

Christiane Mercelis (5 October 1931 – 14 June 2024) was a Belgian tennis player. She was active from 1947 to 1969 and won 47 career singles titles. Mercelis died on 14 June 2024, at the age of 92.

== Career ==
In 1949, Mercelis won the Girls' Singles of the Wimbledon Championships. She competed every year at Wimbledon between 1951 and 1968, and at the French Open between 1952 and 1965. In the French Open, she reached the quarter-finals in 1957.

Her main international career singles highlights included winning the South of France Championships two time (1956–1957), the Cannes Carlton Club Championships (1957), the Trophée Raquette d'Or (1957), the Moscow International Indoor Championships two times (1958–1959), the French Covered Court Championships (1958), the German Covered Court Championships (1959), the Belgian International Championships three times (1959–1960, 1964), the Kent Championships (1960), the Dutch International Championships and the Cannes Gallia Club Championships (1961), the Le Touquet International Championship (1963), the Knokke Le-Zoute International two times (1961, 1964).

Mercelis played for Belgium in the Federation Cup from 1963 to 1964 and from 1966 to 1969, losing all five singles matches, and winning two of her eight doubles matches. She is the oldest player to have played for Belgium, at 37 years 231 days in her last doubles match against South Africa on 24 May 1969, which she won partnering Michele Kahn.

In addition she also won the Belgian National Indoors Championships (closed to Belgian players only) 13 times consecutively (1956–1968) as well as, 14 women's doubles titles, and 16 mixed doubles titles, of which 13 were partnering Jacky Brichant, and the Belgian National Championships (closed) singles event 12 times ( 1951, 1953–1961, 1963–1964, 1966).

== Other titles ==
=== Doubles ===
- 1955: Rome
- 1957: Nice, Antwerp
- 1960: Knokke, Gstaad
- 1961: Brussels, Antwerp, Amsterdam, Hilversum
- 1962: Bremen, Cannes, Nice
- 1963: Ostend
- 1964: Knokke, Menton
- 1965: Knokke
- 1968: Ostend
