= 1953 in tennis =

This page covers all the important events in the sport of tennis in 1953. It provides the results of notable tournaments throughout the year on both the men's and women's ILTF tennis circuits.

== Australian Open ==
Category	Champion(s)	Finalist(s)	Score
Men's singles	(Australia) Ken Rosewall	(Australia) Mervyn Rose	6–0, 6–3, 6–4
Women's singles	(United States) Maureen Connolly	(United States) Julia Sampson	6–3, 6–2
Men's doubles	(Australia) Lew Hoad (Australia) Ken Rosewall	(Australia) Don Candy (Australia) Mervyn Rose	9–11, 6–4, 10–8, 6–4
Women's doubles	(United States) Maureen Connolly (United States) Julia Sampson	(Australia) Mary Bevis Hawton (Australia) Beryl Penrose	6–4, 6–2
Mixed doubles	(United States) Julia Sampson (Australia) Rex Hartwig	(United States) Maureen Connolly (United States) Ham Richardson	6–4, 6–3

== French Open ==
Category	Champion(s)	Finalist(s)	Score
Men's singles	(Australia) Ken Rosewall	(United States) Vic Seixas	6–3, 6–4, 1–6, 6–2
Women's singles	(United States) Maureen Connolly	(United States) Doris Hart	6–2, 6–4
Men's doubles	(Australia) Lew Hoad (Australia) Ken Rosewall	(Australia) Mervyn Rose (Australia) Clive Wilderspin	6–2, 6–1, 6–1
Women's doubles	(United States) Shirley Fry (United States) Doris Hart	(United States) Maureen Connolly (United States) Julia Sampson	6–4, 6–3
Mixed doubles	(United States) Doris Hart (Australia) Vic Seixas	(United States) Maureen Connolly (Australia) Mervyn Rose	4–6, 6–4, 6–0

== Wimbledon ==
Category	Champion(s)	Finalist(s)	Score
Men's singles	(United States) Vic Seixas	(Denmark) Kurt Nielsen	9–7, 6–3, 6–4
Women's singles	(United States) Maureen Connolly	(United States) Doris Hart	8–6, 7–5
Men's doubles	(Australia) Lew Hoad (Australia) Ken Rosewall	(Australia) Rex Hartwig (Australia) Mervyn Rose	6–4, 7–5, 4–6, 7–5
Women's doubles	(United States) Shirley Fry (United States) Doris Hart	(United States) Maureen Connolly (United States) Julia Sampson	6–0, 6–0
Mixed doubles	(United States) Vic Seixas (United States) Doris Hart	(Argentina) Enrique Morea (United States) Shirley Fry	9–7, 7–5

== US Open ==
Category	Champion(s)	Finalist(s)	Score
Men's singles	(United States) Tony Trabert	(United States) Vic Seixas	6–3, 6–2, 6–3
Women's singles	(United States) Maureen Connolly	(United States) Doris Hart	6–2, 6–4
Men's doubles	(Australia) Rex Hartwig (Australia) Mervyn Rose	(United States) Gardnar Mulloy (United States) Bill Talbert	6–4, 4–6, 6–2, 6–4
Women's doubles	(United States) Shirley Fry (United States) Doris Hart	(United States) Louise Brough (United States) Margaret Osborne duPont	6–2, 7–9, 9–7
Mixed doubles	(United States) Doris Hart (United States) Vic Seixas	(United States) Julia Sampson (Australia) Rex Hartwig	6–2, 4–6, 6–4
