= 1953 Wimbledon Championships – Mixed doubles =

Mixed doubles
- 1953 Wimbledon Championships

Final
- Champions: (United States) Vic Seixas (United States) Doris Hart
- Runners-up: (Argentina) Enrique Morea (United States) Shirley Fry
- Score: 9–7, 7–5

Details
- Draw: 80 (5Q)
- Seeds: 4

Events
Singles	men	women		boys	girls
Doubles	men	women	mixed	boys	girls
- Wimbledon Championships

Frank Sedgman and Doris Hart were the defending champions, but Sedgman was ineligible to compete after turning professional. Hart partnered with Vic Seixas, and they defeated Enrique Morea and Shirley Fry in the final, 9–7, 7–5 to win the mixed doubles tennis title at the 1953 Wimbledon Championships.

== Seeds ==
1. (United States) Vic Seixas / (United States) Doris Hart (champions)
2. (Australia) Mervyn Rose / (United States) Maureen Connolly (fourth round)
3. (United Kingdom) Geoffrey Paish / (United Kingdom) Jean Rinkel-Quertier (quarterfinals)
4. (Argentina) Enrique Morea / (United States) Shirley Fry (final)

Click on the seed number of a player to go to their draw section.

== Draw ==
Key

- Q = Qualifier
- WC = Wild card
- LL = Lucky loser
- Alt = Alternate
- ITF = ITF entry
- PR = Protected ranking
- SR = Special ranking
- SE = Special exempt
- JE = Junior exempt
- JR = Junior Accelerator Programme entrant
- CO = College Accelerator Programme entrant
- NG = Next Gen Accelerator Program entrant
- w/o = Walkover
- r = Retired
- d = Defaulted

=== Finals ===
Quarterfinals
(Australia) George Worthington (United Kingdom) Pat Ward	6	4	6
(Hungary) József Asbóth (Hungary) Zsuzsa Körmöczy	2	6	1
4	(Argentina) Enrique Morea (United States) Shirley Fry	6	6
(United Kingdom) Jeffrey Michelmore (South Africa) Joan Scott	1	3
(Australia) Lew Hoad (United States) Julia Sampson	6	6
3	(United Kingdom) Geoffrey Paish (United Kingdom) Jean Rinkel-Quertier	3	3
(Poland) Władysław Skonecki (Switzerland) Violette Alvensleben-Rigollet	2	1
1	(United States) Vic Seixas (United States) Doris Hart	6	6

Semifinals
(Australia) George Worthington (United Kingdom) Pat Ward	2	2
4	(Argentina) Enrique Morea (United States) Shirley Fry	6	6
(Australia) Lew Hoad (United States) Julia Sampson	3	5
1	(United States) Vic Seixas (United States) Doris Hart	6	7

Final
4	(Argentina) Enrique Morea (United States) Shirley Fry	7	5
1	(United States) Vic Seixas (United States) Doris Hart	9	7

=== Top half ===
==== Section 1 ====
First round

Second round
2	(Australia) Mervyn Rose (United States) Maureen Connolly	6	6
(Australia) Ian Ayre (Argentina) Mary Terán de Weiss	0	4
(India) Naresh Kumar (United Kingdom) Freda Hammersley	6	6
Q	(Southern Rhodesia) Don Black (United Kingdom) Diane Midgley	3	1
(Australia) George Worthington (United Kingdom) Pat Ward	6	6
(United Kingdom) Claude Lister (United Kingdom) Thelma Lister	1	4
(United Kingdom) Bob Lee (United Kingdom) Norma Seacy	5	2
(United Kingdom) Warwick Shute (United Kingdom) Denise Collier	7	6

Third round
2	(Australia) M Rose (United States) M Connolly	6	6
(India) N Kumar (United Kingdom) W Hammersley	4	3
(Australia) G Worthington (United Kingdom) P Ward	6	6
(United Kingdom) W Shute (United Kingdom) D Collier	4	4

Fourth round
2	(Australia) M Rose (United States) M Connolly	7	4	4
(Australia) G Worthington (United Kingdom) P Ward	5	6	6

==== Section 2 ====
First round

Second round
(South Africa) Johann Kupferburger (South Africa) Lucille van der Westhuizen
(West Germany) Horst Hermann (West Germany) Erika Vollmer	w/o
(Belgium) Jacques Brichant (Belgium) Janine de Ridder	7	6	12
Q	(Indonesia) Liep-Tjiauw Tan (South Africa) Maureen Reeves	9	2	14
(Hungary) József Asbóth (Hungary) Zsuzsa Körmöczy	6	6
(United Kingdom) Henry Billington (United Kingdom) Susan Billington	4	4
(Belgium) Gino Mezzi (United Kingdom) Rita Bentley	9	6
(South Africa) Ian Vermaak (United Kingdom) Shirley Bloomer	7	0

Third round
(South Africa) J Kupferburger (South Africa) L van der Westhuizen	6	6
(Indonesia) L-T Tan (South Africa) M Reeves	4	4
(Hungary) J Asbóth (Hungary) Z Körmöczy	6	7
(Belgium) G Mezzi (United Kingdom) R Bentley	2	5

Fourth round
(South Africa) J Kupferburger (South Africa) L van der Westhuizen	3	2
(Hungary) J Asbóth (Hungary) Z Körmöczy	6	6

==== Section 3 ====
First round

Second round
4	(Argentina) Enrique Morea (United States) Shirley Fry	6	3	6
(France) Philippe Chatrier (France) Susan Chatrier	2	6	1
(United Kingdom) Colin Hannam (United Kingdom) Anne Shilcock	6	6
(United Kingdom) Ivor Warwick (United Kingdom) Pat Hird	3	3
(United Kingdom) Bobby Thorn (United Kingdom) Georgie Woodgate	6	3	0
(United States) John Ager (United Kingdom) Jean Petchell	2	6	6
(Australia) Rex Hartwig (United States) Dorothy Knode	6	6
(France) Jean Borotra (United Kingdom) Margot Gordon	3	1

Third round
4	(Argentina) E Morea (United States) S Fry	6	6
(United Kingdom) C Hannam (United Kingdom) A Shilcock	2	2
(United States) J Ager (United Kingdom) J Petchell	4	1
(Australia) R Hartwig (United States) D Knode	6	6

Fourth round
4	(Argentina) E Morea (United States) S Fry	5	6	6
(Australia) R Hartwig (United States) D Knode	7	3	4

==== Section 4 ====
First round
(Sweden) Staffan Stockenberg (Sweden) Birgit Gullbrandsson-Sandén	6	2	5
(Republic of Ireland) Guy Jackson (Republic of Ireland) Maeve Downey	4	6	7
(South Africa) Russell Seymour (Southern Rhodesia) Joan Bowyer	6	6
Q	(United Kingdom) Rex Hack (United Kingdom) Noelle Knight	4	2
(United States) Hugh Stewart (Austria) Helga Strecker	3	0
(United Kingdom) Jeffrey Michelmore (South Africa) Joan Scott	6	6
(United States) Malcolm Fox (United Kingdom) Valerie Lewis	10	11
(United Kingdom) Eric Filby (United Kingdom) Rosemary Walsh	8	9
(Romania) Gheorghe Sturdza (United Kingdom) Hazel Cheadle	2	0
(United Kingdom) Tony Dawes (United Kingdom) Betty Dawes	6	6
(United Kingdom) Cliff Hovell (United Kingdom) Mary Halford	2	4
(United Kingdom) Colin Baxter (United Kingdom) Molly Mackay	6	6
(United Kingdom) Roland Carter (United Kingdom) Molly Blair	0	3
Q	(United Kingdom) Billy Knight (United Kingdom) Jean Knight	6	6
(United Kingdom) Tommy Anderson (United Kingdom) Joan MacLeod	6	6	6
(Trinidad and Tobago) Ian McDonald (Australia) Anne Goldsworthy	3	8	3

Second round
(Republic of Ireland) G Jackson (Republic of Ireland) M Downey	6	2	5
(South Africa) R Seymour (Southern Rhodesia) J Bowyer	4	6	7
(United Kingdom) J Michelmore (South Africa) J Scott	6	6
(United States) M Fox (United Kingdom) V Lewis	4	4
(United Kingdom) A Dawes (United Kingdom) E Dawes	3	10	7
(United Kingdom) C Baxter (United Kingdom) M Mackay	6	8	5
Q	(United Kingdom) W Knight (United Kingdom) J Knight	1	5
(United Kingdom) T Anderson (United Kingdom) J MacLeod	6	7

Third round
(South Africa) R Seymour (Southern Rhodesia) J Bowyer	4	1
(United Kingdom) J Michelmore (South Africa) J Scott	6	6
(United Kingdom) A Dawes (United Kingdom) E Dawes
(United Kingdom) T Anderson (United Kingdom) J MacLeod	w/o

Fourth round
(United Kingdom) J Michelmore (South Africa) J Scott	6	8
(United Kingdom) A Dawes (United Kingdom) E Dawes	3	6

=== Bottom half ===
==== Section 5 ====
First round
(United Kingdom) Roy Wilson (United Kingdom) Bobbie Wilson	8	3	1
Q	(United Kingdom) John White (United Kingdom) Margaret Carlisle	6	6	6
(United Kingdom) Headley Baxter (United Kingdom) Peggy Dawson-Scott	6	6	6
(France) Jean-Claude Molinari (United States) Gloria Butler	4	8	4
(United Kingdom) John Barrett (United Kingdom) Pat Harrison	11	3	3
(South Africa) Bryan Woodroffe (United States) Barbara Davidson	9	6	6
(Poland) Czesław Spychała (United Kingdom) Bea Walter	6	2	6
(Australia) Jack Arkinstall (France) Suzanne Schmitt	3	6	4
(Australia) Lew Hoad (United States) Julia Sampson	6	6
(Republic of Ireland) Joe Hackett (United Kingdom) Doreen Spiers	1	3
(United Kingdom) Ron Statham (United Kingdom) Helen Fletcher	2	9	6
(Belgium) Philippe Washer (Belgium) Christiane Mercelis	6	7	4
(India) Narendra Nath (France) Michelle Bourbonnais	6	6
(United Kingdom) Dennis Brown (United Kingdom) Lorna White	4	1
(Iran) Matthew Mohtadi (United Kingdom) Barbara Knapp	6	6
(Republic of Ireland) Vivian Gotto (Republic of Ireland) Roguie Bain	3	2

Second round
(United Kingdom) J White (United Kingdom) M Carlisle	6	2	0
(United Kingdom) H Baxter (United Kingdom) P Dawson-Scott	4	6	6
(South Africa) B Woodroffe (United States) B Davidson	6	6
(Poland) C Spychała (United Kingdom) B Walter	2	4
(Australia) L Hoad (United States) J Sampson	6	6
(United Kingdom) R Statham (United Kingdom) H Fletcher	1	2
(India) N Nath (France) M Bourbonnais	5	7
(Iran) M Mohtadi (United Kingdom) B Knapp	7	9

Third round
(United Kingdom) H Baxter (United Kingdom) P Dawson-Scott	3	4
(South Africa) B Woodroffe (United States) B Davidson	6	6
(Australia) L Hoad (United States) J Sampson
(Iran) M Mohtadi (United Kingdom) B Knapp	w/o

Fourth round
(South Africa) B Woodroffe (United States) B Davidson	3	4
(Australia) L Hoad (United States) J Sampson	6	6

==== Section 6 ====
First round

Second round
(Australia) Barry Green (United Kingdom) Billie Woodgate	4	5
(United Kingdom) Roger Becker (United Kingdom) Viola White	6	7
(Australia) Clive Wilderspin (United Kingdom) Gem Hoahing	5	7
(Spain) Carlos Ferrer (Spain) María Josefa de Riba	7	9
(Belgium) Jacques Peten (South Africa) Audrey Bilse	5	4
(United Kingdom) John Horn (United Kingdom) Elaine Watson	7	6
(Belgium) Pierre Geelhand de Merxem (South Africa) Dora Kilian	3	2
3	(United Kingdom) Geoffrey Paish (United Kingdom) Jean Rinkel-Quertier	6	6

Third round
(United Kingdom) R Becker (United Kingdom) V White	5	7
(Spain) C Ferrer (Spain) MJ de Riba	7	9
(United Kingdom) J Horn (United Kingdom) E Watson	4	3
3	(United Kingdom) G Paish (United Kingdom) J Rinkel-Quertier	6	6

Fourth round
(Spain) C Ferrer (Spain) MJ de Riba	2	3
3	(United Kingdom) G Paish (United Kingdom) J Rinkel-Quertier	6	6

==== Section 7 ====
First round

Second round
(United Kingdom) Ian Campbell (United Kingdom) Helen Proudfoot	3	6
(Hungary) Antal Jancsó (Hungary) Márta Peterdy-Wolf	6	8
(United Kingdom) Leslie Cater (United Kingdom) Leonie Brighton	5	6	1
(Hong Kong) Edwin Tsai (Bermuda) Heather Brewer	7	4	6
(Poland) Władysław Skonecki (Switzerland) Violette Alvensleben-Rigollet	6	6
(Netherlands) Fred Dehnert (Netherlands) Fenny ten Bosch	3	3
(France) Bernard Destremau (France) Nelly Adamson
(Netherlands) Boebi van Meegeren (Sweden) Mary Lagerborg	w/o

Third round
(Hungary) A Jancsó (Hungary) M Peterdy-Wolf	4	6	2
(Hong Kong) E Tsai (Bermuda) H Brewer	6	3	6
(Poland) W Skonecki (Switzerland) V Alvensleben-Rigollet
(France) B Destremau (France) N Adamson

Fourth round
(Hong Kong) E Tsai (Bermuda) H Brewer	6	4	4
(Poland) W Skonecki (Switzerland) V Alvensleben-Rigollet	2	6	6

==== Section 8 ====
First round

Second round
(West Germany) Ernst Buchholz (West Germany) Toto Zehden	w/o
(Austria) Freddie Huber (Austria) Elizabeth Broz
(Republic of Ireland) Cyril Kemp (Republic of Ireland) Betty Lombard	6	2	6
(Dominion of Ceylon) Doug Scharenguivel (United Kingdom) Mary Eyre	4	6	4
(Australia) Harry Hopman (Australia) Nell Hopman	1	7	6
(United Kingdom) Don Butler (United Kingdom) Rosemary Bulleid	6	5	1
(Spain) Jaime Bartrolí (United Kingdom) Nancy Glover	0	0
1	(United States) Vic Seixas (United States) Doris Hart	6	6

Third round
(Austria) A Huber (Austria) E Broz	6	8
(Republic of Ireland) C Kemp (Republic of Ireland) E Lombard	4	6
(Australia) H Hopman (Australia) E Hopman	1	2
1	(United States) V Seixas (United States) D Hart	6	6

Fourth round
(Austria) A Huber (Austria) E Broz	3	4
1	(United States) V Seixas (United States) D Hart	6	6
