= 1954 Wightman Cup =

International women's tennis competition

Details
- Edition: 26th

Champion
- Winning nation: United States

The 1954 Wightman Cup was the 26th edition of the annual competition between the United States and Great Britain. It was held at the All England Lawn Tennis and Croquet Club in London in England in the United Kingdom.

Great Britain
0
All England Lawn Tennis and Croquet Club, London, England, United Kingdom
1954
Grass

United States
6

			1	2	3
1	(United Kingdom) (United States)	Helen Fletcher; Maureen Connolly	1; 6	3; 6
2	(United Kingdom) (United States)	Anne Shilcock; Doris Hart	4; 6	1; 6
3	(United Kingdom) (United States)	Helen Fletcher; Doris Hart	1; 6	8; 6	2; 6
4	(United Kingdom) (United States)	Anne Shilcock; Maureen Connolly	2; 6	2; 6
5	(United Kingdom) (United States)	Angela Buxton; Louise Brough	6; 8	2; 6
6	(United Kingdom) (United States)	Angela Buxton / Pat Hird; Louise Brough / Margaret Osborne duPont	6; 2	4; 6	5; 7
7	(United Kingdom) (United States)	Helen Fletcher / Anne Shilcock; Shirley Fry / Doris Hart				not played
