= 1953 Wimbledon Championships – Women's doubles =

Women's doubles
- 1953 Wimbledon Championships

Final
- Champions: (United States) Shirley Fry (United States) Doris Hart
- Runners-up: (United States) Maureen Connolly (United States) Julia Sampson
- Score: 6–0, 6–0

Details
- Draw: 48 (5 Q )
- Seeds: 4

Events
Singles	men	women		boys	girls
Doubles	men	women	mixed	boys	girls
← 1952 ·	Wimbledon Championships	· 1954 →

Shirley Fry and Doris Hart successfully defended their title, defeating Maureen Connolly and Julia Sampson in the final, 6–0, 6–0 to win the ladies' doubles tennis title at the 1953 Wimbledon Championships.

== Seeds ==
1. (United States) Shirley Fry / (United States) Doris Hart (champions)
2. (United States) Maureen Connolly / (United States) Julia Sampson (final)
3. (United Kingdom) Helen Fletcher / (United Kingdom) Jean Rinkel-Quertier (semifinals)
4. (Australia) Barbara Davidson / (United States) Dorothy Knode (second round)

Click on the seed number of a player to go to their draw section.

== Draw ==
=== Key ===
- Q = Qualifier
- WC = Wild card
- LL = Lucky loser
- Alt = Alternate
- SE = Special exempt
- PR = Protected ranking
- ITF = ITF entry
- JE = Junior exempt
- w/o = Walkover
- r = Retired
- d = Defaulted
- SR = Special ranking

=== Finals ===
Quarterfinals
1	(United States) Shirley Fry (United States) Doris Hart	6	6
(South Africa) Dora Kilian (South Africa) Lucille van der Westhuizen	2	2
3	(United Kingdom) Helen Fletcher (United Kingdom) Jean Rinkel-Quertier	7	6
Q	(United Kingdom) Ruth Bennett (United Kingdom) Jean Petchell	5	0
(United Kingdom) Angela Mortimer (United Kingdom) Anne Shilcock	6	6
(United Kingdom) Mary Eyre (United Kingdom) Viola White	4	4
(United Kingdom) Rosemary Bulleid (United Kingdom) Pat Ward	2	3
2	(United States) Maureen Connolly (United States) Julia Sampson	6	6

Semifinals
1	(United States) Shirley Fry (United States) Doris Hart	6	6
3	(United Kingdom) Helen Fletcher (United Kingdom) Jean Rinkel-Quertier	0	0
(United Kingdom) Angela Mortimer (United Kingdom) Anne Shilcock	2	3
2	(United States) Maureen Connolly (United States) Julia Sampson	6	6

Final
1	(United States) Shirley Fry (United States) Doris Hart	6	6
2	(United States) Maureen Connolly (United States) Julia Sampson	0	0

=== Top half ===
==== Section 1 ====
First round

Second round
1	(United States) Shirley Fry (United States) Doris Hart
(United Kingdom) Joan Curry (United Kingdom) Rita Drobný	w/o
(United Kingdom) Bea Walter (United Kingdom) Billie Woodgate	6	1	4
(United Kingdom) Nancy Glover (Argentina) Mary Terán de Weiss	3	6	6
(United Kingdom) Audrey Houseley (United Kingdom) Molly Stone	2	4
(South Africa) Dora Kilian (South Africa) Lucille van der Westhuizen	6	6
(United Kingdom) Valerie Lewis (United Kingdom) Rosemary Walsh	3	6	4
(Belgium) Christiane Mercelis (Belgium) Janine de Ridder	6	4	6

Third round
1	(United States) S Fry (United States) D Hart	6	6
(United Kingdom) N Glover (Argentina) M Terán de Weiss	0	0
(South Africa) D Kilian (South Africa) L van der Westhuizen	6	8	6
(Belgium) C Mercelis (Belgium) J de Ridder	8	6	2

Quarterfinals
1	(United States) S Fry (United States) D Hart	6	6
(South Africa) D Kilian (South Africa) L van der Westhuizen	2	2

==== Section 2 ====
First round
3	(United Kingdom) Helen Fletcher (United Kingdom) Jean Rinkel-Quertier	6	6
(United Kingdom) Gem Hoahing (United Kingdom) Georgie Woodgate	4	2
(Australia) Margaret Fisher (Australia) Anne Goldsworthy
(Sweden) Birgit Gullbrandsson-Sandén (Sweden) Mary Lagerborg	w/o
(Switzerland) Violette Alvensleben-Rigollet (Spain) María Josefa de Riba	6	4	6
Q	(United Kingdom) Margaret Lewis (United Kingdom) Winifred Nickless	4	6	4
(United Kingdom) Ada Ernest (United Kingdom) Laura Morgan	3	6	4
(United Kingdom) Freda Hammersley (United Kingdom) Phyllis King	6	1	6
Q	(United Kingdom) Ruth Bennett (United Kingdom) Jean Petchell	6	6
(United Kingdom) Pat Gotla (United Kingdom) Barbara Knapp	4	3
(United Kingdom) Betty Dawes (United Kingdom) Peggy Dawson-Scott	5	1
(France) Susan Chatrier (United States) Baba Lewis	7	6
(France) Nelly Adamson (France) Suzanne Schmitt	6	4	6
(South Africa) Mrs KE Graham Murray (South Africa) Mrs J Higginson	1	6	4
(United Kingdom) Pearl Panton (United Kingdom) Vera Thomas	6	6
Q	(United Kingdom) Jean Knight (United Kingdom) Mary Stephens	1	4

Second round
3	(United Kingdom) H Fletcher (United Kingdom) J Rinkel-Quertier	6	6
(Australia) M Fisher (Australia) A Goldsworthy	2	3
(Switzerland) V Alvensleben-Rigollet (Spain) MJ de Riba	6	6
(United Kingdom) W Hammersley (United Kingdom) P King	1	4
Q	(United Kingdom) R Bennett (United Kingdom) J Petchell	6	6
(France) S Chatrier (United States) B Lewis	4	3
(France) N Adamson (France) S Schmitt	3	8	6
(United Kingdom) P Panton (United Kingdom) V Thomas	6	6	4

Third round
3	(United Kingdom) H Fletcher (United Kingdom) J Rinkel-Quertier	6	6
(Switzerland) V Alvensleben-Rigollet (Spain) MJ de Riba	2	0
Q	(United Kingdom) R Bennett (United Kingdom) J Petchell	6	4	7
(France) N Adamson (France) S Schmitt	3	6	5

Quarterfinals
3	(United Kingdom) H Fletcher (United Kingdom) J Rinkel-Quertier	7	6
Q	(United Kingdom) R Bennett (United Kingdom) J Petchell	5	0

=== Bottom half ===
==== Section 3 ====
First round
(United Kingdom) Susan Billington (United Kingdom) Margot Parker	6	1
(United Kingdom) Angela Mortimer (United Kingdom) Anne Shilcock	8	6
(United Kingdom) Margaret Grace (United Kingdom) Judy Wallace	4	6
(United Kingdom) Molly Mackay (United Kingdom) Helen Proudfoot	6	8
Q	(United Kingdom) Patience Chapman (United Kingdom) Vivienne Uber	3	3
(Hungary) Mrs E Erdődy Bárd (Hungary) Zsuzsa Körmöczy	6	6
(Bermuda) Heather Brewer (United Kingdom) Hazel Cheadle	6	6
(Southern Rhodesia) Joan Bowyer (United Kingdom) Gladys Lines	1	3
(United States) Gloria Butler (United States) Anne Gray	5	2
(United Kingdom) Margaret Carlisle (United Kingdom) Katie Johns	7	6
(West Germany) Erika Vollmer (West Germany) Toto Zehden	4	4
(United Kingdom) Shirley Bloomer (United Kingdom) Pat Harrison	6	6
(United Kingdom) Mary Eyre (United Kingdom) Viola White	8	6
(United Kingdom) Joyce Coles (United Kingdom) Mary Wavish	6	2
(France) Michelle Bourbonnais (Netherlands) Fenny ten Bosch	3	1
4	(United States) Barbara Davidson (United States) Dorothy Knode	6	6

Second round
(United Kingdom) A Mortimer (United Kingdom) A Shilcock	6	6
(United Kingdom) M Mackay (United Kingdom) H Proudfoot	2	2
(Hungary) Mrs E Erdődy Bárd (Hungary) Z Körmöczy	6	6	7
(Bermuda) H Brewer (United Kingdom) H Cheadle	3	8	5
(United Kingdom) M Carlisle (United Kingdom) K Johns	w/o
(United Kingdom) S Bloomer (United Kingdom) P Harrison
(United Kingdom) M Eyre (United Kingdom) V White	6	5	6
4	(United States) B Davidson (United States) D Knode	4	7	3

Third round
(United Kingdom) A Mortimer (United Kingdom) A Shilcock	6	6
(Hungary) Mrs E Erdődy Bárd (Hungary) Z Körmöczy	4	4
(United Kingdom) S Bloomer (United Kingdom) P Harrison	4	7
(United Kingdom) M Eyre (United Kingdom) V White	6	9

Quarterfinals
(United Kingdom) A Mortimer (United Kingdom) A Shilcock	6	6
(United Kingdom) M Eyre (United Kingdom) V White	4	4

==== Section 4 ====
First round

Second round
(United Kingdom) BM Goodman (United Kingdom) Margaret Knott	3	3
(United Kingdom) Valerie Gardner (United Kingdom) Janet Morgan	6	6
(United Kingdom) Rosemary Bulleid (United Kingdom) Pat Ward	6	6
Q	(United Kingdom) SC Collett (United Kingdom) Mrs J Maltby	3	3
(Republic of Ireland) Maeve Downey (Republic of Ireland) Betty Lombard	1	2
(United Kingdom) Molly Blair (Australia) Nell Hopman	6	6
(South Africa) Audrey Bilse (South Africa) Joan Scott	4	0
2	(United States) Maureen Connolly (United States) Julia Sampson	6	6

Third round
(United Kingdom) V Gardner (United Kingdom) J Morgan	1	4
(United Kingdom) R Bulleid (United Kingdom) P Ward	6	6
(United Kingdom) M Blair (Australia) N Hopman	1	2
2	(United States) M Connolly (United States) J Sampson	6	6

Quarterfinals
(United Kingdom) R Bulleid (United Kingdom) P Ward	2	3
2	(United States) M Connolly (United States) J Sampson	6	6
