= 1953 Wimbledon Championships – Men's singles =

Men's singles
- 1953 Wimbledon Championships

Final
- Champion: (United States) Vic Seixas
- Runner-up: (Denmark) Kurt Nielsen
- Score: 9–7, 6–3, 6–4

Details
- Draw: 128 (10Q)
- Seeds: 8

Events
Singles	men	women		boys	girls
Doubles	men	women	mixed	boys	girls
- Wimbledon Championships

In the 1953 Wimbledon Championships – Gentlemen's Singles, second seed Vic Seixas defeated the unseeded Kurt Nielsen in the final, 9–7, 6–3, 6–4, to take the gentlemen's singles tennis title. Frank Sedgman was the defending champion, but was ineligible to compete after turning professional.

== Progress of the competition ==
It was the first of two men's singles competitions at Wimbledon in which an unseeded Nielsen had progressed to the final. On the way, he defeated both the number one seed Ken Rosewall and a favourite with the Wimbledon crowd, fourth-seeded Jaroslav Drobný, the latter in straight sets.

Drobný's earlier third-round match against Budge Patty, came to be regarded as a classic in Wimbledon history. The match lasted for 93 games, and held the Wimbledon record for the longest match until 1969.

== Seeds ==
1. (Australia) Ken Rosewall (quarterfinals)
2. (United States) Vic Seixas (champion)
3. (Australia) Mervyn Rose (semifinals)
4. (Egypt) Jaroslav Drobný (semifinals)
5. (United States) Gardnar Mulloy (fourth round)
6. (Australia) Lew Hoad (quarterfinals)
7. (United States) Art Larsen (quarterfinals)
8. (Argentina) Enrique Morea (second round)

Click on the seed number of a player to go to their draw section.

== Draw ==
Key

- Q = Qualifier
- WC = Wild card
- LL = Lucky loser
- Alt = Alternate
- ITF = ITF entry
- PR = Protected ranking
- SR = Special ranking
- SE = Special exempt
- JE = Junior exempt
- JR = Junior Accelerator Programme entrant
- CO = College Accelerator Programme entrant
- NG = Next Gen Accelerator Program entrant
- w/o = Walkover
- r = Retired
- d = Defaulted

=== Finals ===
Quarterfinals
2	(United States) Vic Seixas	5	6	6	1	9
6	(Australia) Lew Hoad	7	4	3	6	7
3	(Australia) Mervyn Rose	6	6	16
7	(United States) Art Larsen	3	3	14
(Sweden) Sven Davidson	5	4	0
4	(Egypt) Jaroslav Drobný	7	6	6
(Denmark) Kurt Nielsen	7	4	6	6	6
1	(Australia) Ken Rosewall	5	6	8	0	2

Semifinals
2	(United States) Vic Seixas	6	10	9	6	6
3	(Australia) Mervyn Rose	4	12	11	4	3
4	(Egypt) Jaroslav Drobný	4	3	2
(Denmark) Kurt Nielsen	6	6	6

Final
2	(United States) Vic Seixas	9	6	6
(Denmark) Kurt Nielsen	7	3	4

=== Top half ===
==== Section 1 ====
First round
2	(United States) Vic Seixas	6	6	6
(United Kingdom) Bob Lee	3	0	1
(Poland) Władysław Skonecki	6	6	6
Q	(United Kingdom) Robin Kipping	2	4	2
(Indonesia) Liep-Tjiauw Tan	6	5	1	6	6
(Dominion of Ceylon) Doug Scharenguivel	4	7	6	3	2
(Republic of Ireland) Jim McArdle	0	3	4
(Belgium) Philippe Washer	6	6	6
(Australia) George Worthington	6	5	6	6
(Brazil) Armando Vieira	0	7	1	1
(Denmark) Jørgen Ulrich	3	5	3
(Sweden) Lennart Bergelin	6	7	6
(Hungary) Zoltán Katona	6	6	6	6
(Netherlands) Boebi van Meegeren	2	8	4	1
(Philippines) Felicisimo Ampon	6	6	6
(France) Gérard Pilet	1	1	1

Second round
2	(United States) V Seixas	6	6	7
(Poland) W Skonecki	2	2	5
(Indonesia) L-T Tan	0	3	3
(Belgium) P Washer	6	6	6
(Australia) G Worthington	2	6	6	6
(Sweden) L Bergelin	6	0	3	2
(Hungary) Z Katona	4	3	1
(Philippines) F Ampon	6	6	6

Third round
2	(United States) V Seixas	6	6	6
(Belgium) P Washer	3	1	3
(Australia) G Worthington	6	6	8
(Philippines) F Ampon	2	2	6

Fourth round
2	(United States) V Seixas	10	7	6
(Australia) G Worthington	8	5	3

==== Section 2 ====
First round
6	(Australia) Lew Hoad	6	6	7
(South Africa) Russell Seymour	4	2	5
(United Kingdom) Clive Bernstein	5	3	3
(India) Narendra Nath	7	6	6
(Italy) Gianni Clerici	6	8	2	4
Q	(Socialist Federal Republic of Yugoslavia) Stefán László	8	6	6	6
(United Kingdom) John Barrett	6	6	6
(United Kingdom) Ron Reeve	1	3	4
(United Kingdom) Douglas Snart	0	6	6	3
Q	(Socialist Federal Republic of Yugoslavia) Sima Nikolić	6	8	4	6
(United Kingdom) Tony Mottram	4	6	6	3	4
(United States) Hugh Stewart	6	3	4	6	6
(United Kingdom) Bernard Crouch	6	6	6
(United Kingdom) Edmund David	3	3	3
(United Kingdom) Peter Hare	0	3	6
(Austria) Hans Redl	6	6	8

Second round
6	(Australia) L Hoad	6	6	6
(India) N Nath	0	4	1
Q	(Socialist Federal Republic of Yugoslavia) S László	1	3	8	12
(United Kingdom) J Barrett	6	6	6	14
Q	(Socialist Federal Republic of Yugoslavia) S Nikolić	4	2	2
(United States) H Stewart	6	6	6
(United Kingdom) B Crouch	2	3	7	4
(Austria) H Redl	6	6	5	6

Third round
6	(Australia) L Hoad	6	6	6
(United Kingdom) J Barrett	2	2	1
(United States) H Stewart	6	6	6
(Austria) H Redl	3	1	0

Fourth round
6	(Australia) L Hoad	6	6	6
(United States) H Stewart	0	3	2

==== Section 3 ====
First round
3	(Australia) Mervyn Rose	8	6	4	6
Q	(India) Ramanathan Krishnan	6	4	6	1
(United Kingdom) Colin Hannam	3	5	6	3
(United Kingdom) Tim Lewis	6	7	3	6
(Belgium) Jacques Peten	6	6	6
Q	(Republic of Ireland) Robin Condy	1	2	2
(France) Jean-Claude Molinari	8	6	8
(United Kingdom) Geoff Ward	6	1	6
(United Kingdom) John Horn	6	6	6
(Romania) Gheorghe Sturdza	0	2	0
(Poland) Czesław Spychała	7	1	2
(Southern Rhodesia) Don Black	9	6	6
(United Kingdom) Roger Becker	6	7	3	4
(Belgium) Jacques Brichant	3	9	6	6
(United Kingdom) Claude Lister	6	6	6
(West Germany) Horst Hermann	4	2	4

Second round
3	(Australia) M Rose	6	6	6
(United Kingdom) N Lewis	3	3	2
(Belgium) J Peten	1	6	0	0
(France) J-C Molinari	6	3	6	6
(United Kingdom) J Horn	6	6	5	5	6
(Southern Rhodesia) D Black	3	4	7	7	8
(Belgium) J Brichant	8	6	6
(United Kingdom) C Lister	6	3	0

Third round
3	(Australia) M Rose	6	6	6
(France) J-C Molinari	4	0	4
(Southern Rhodesia) D Black	5	8	3
(Belgium) J Brichant	7	10	6

Fourth round
3	(Australia) M Rose	6	6	8
(Belgium) J Brichant	4	4	6

==== Section 4 ====
First round
7	(United States) Art Larsen	6	6	8
(Hungary) Antal Jancsó	2	4	6
(United Kingdom) Don Butler	6	6	3	6
(Spain) Carlos Ferrer	3	3	6	4
Q	(United Kingdom) Ralph Oliver	3	6	6
Q	(United Kingdom) Jeffrey Michelmore	6	8	8
(Socialist Federal Republic of Yugoslavia) Josip Palada	6	6	7
(United Kingdom) Billy Knight	2	2	5
(South Africa) Johann Kupferburger	5	3	3
(France) Jean-Noël Grinda	7	6	6
(France) Philippe Chatrier	0	3	0
(Sweden) Torsten Johansson	6	6	6
Q	(United Kingdom) Laurie Proctor	1	1	3
(Denmark) Torben Ulrich	6	6	6
(Republic of Ireland) Guy Jackson	4	4	5
(Italy) Giuseppe Merlo	6	6	7

Second round
7	(United States) A Larsen	6	6	7
(United Kingdom) D Butler	4	2	5
Q	(United Kingdom) J Michelmore	1	3	1
(Socialist Federal Republic of Yugoslavia) J Palada	6	6	6
(France) J-N Grinda	6	1	4	2
(Sweden) T Johansson	3	6	6	6
(Denmark) T Ulrich	6	3	6	6
(Italy) G Merlo	4	6	2	3

Third round
7	(United States) A Larsen	6	6	7
(Socialist Federal Republic of Yugoslavia) J Palada	1	2	5
(Sweden) T Johansson	7	6	2	7
(Denmark) T Ulrich	5	3	6	5

Fourth round
7	(United States) A Larsen	8	6	6
(Sweden) T Johansson	6	2	0

=== Bottom half ===
==== Section 5 ====
First round
(United Kingdom) Bobby Wilson	6	6	6
(United Kingdom) Cliff Hovell	2	4	2
(Switzerland) René Buser	0	6	6	7
(Netherlands) Hans van Dalsum	6	4	2	5
(United Kingdom) Darrell Shaw	2	9	5
(Sweden) Sven Davidson	6	11	7
(United States) Grant Golden	6	7	6
(Socialist Federal Republic of Yugoslavia) Vladimir Petrović	1	5	1
(Australia) Clive Wilderspin	6	6	6
(West Germany) Ernst Buchholz	4	2	4
(United Kingdom) Eric Bulmer	6	6	6
(Republic of Ireland) Vivian Gotto	2	2	0
(Hungary) József Asbóth	6	7	2	2
(Australia) Ian Ayre	4	9	6	6
(Trinidad and Tobago) Ian McDonald	4	6	0
8	(Argentina) Enrique Morea	6	8	6

Second round
(United Kingdom) R Wilson	6	6	6
(Switzerland) René Buser	4	3	3
(Sweden) S Davidson	6	6	6
(United States) G Golden	3	4	4
(Australia) C Wilderspin	6	6	7
(United Kingdom) E Bulmer	2	3	5
(Australia) I Ayre	6	6	11	6
8	(Argentina) E Morea	8	4	9	2

Third round
(United Kingdom) R Wilson	3	6	10	0	2
(Sweden) S Davidson	6	4	8	6	6
(Australia) C Wilderspin	5	2	5
(Australia) I Ayre	7	6	7

Fourth round
(Sweden) S Davidson	6	6	6
(Australia) I Ayre	3	4	4

==== Section 6 ====
First round
(Australia) Rex Hartwig	6	6	6
LL	(United States) Wayne Van Voorhees	3	2	1
(United Kingdom) Geoffrey Paish	6	6	6
(South Africa) Ian Vermaak	4	4	3
(Poland) Ignacy Tłoczyński	3	6	6	6
(Uruguay) Eduardo Argon	6	2	3	2
(United Kingdom) Tony Starte	6	6	5	6
(Denmark) Søren Højberg	2	3	7	2
(France) Jacques Thomas	2	4	4
(United States) Budge Patty	6	6	6
(United Kingdom) Headley Baxter	1	8	3	3
(Hong Kong) Edwin Tsai	6	6	6	6
(United Kingdom) Howard Walton	2	2	0
(United States) Tut Bartzen	6	6	6
(France) Bernard Destremau	0	1	2
4	(Egypt) Jaroslav Drobný	6	6	6

Second round
(Australia) R Hartwig	6	6	6	6
(United Kingdom) G Paish	8	3	3	2
(Poland) I Tłoczyński	6	4	6	7
(United Kingdom) A Starte	4	6	4	5
(United States) J Patty	7	6	6
(Hong Kong) E Tsai	5	2	0
(United States) B Bartzen	4	3	3
4	(Egypt) J Drobný	6	6	6

Third round
(Australia) R Hartwig	6	6	6
(Poland) I Tłoczyński	1	1	3
(United States) J Patty	6	18	6	6	10
4	(Egypt) J Drobný	8	16	3	8	12

Fourth round
(Australia) R Hartwig	3	5	5
4	(Egypt) J Drobný	6	7	7

==== Section 7 ====
First round
(Australia) Barry Green	3	2	6	5
(Denmark) Kurt Nielsen	6	6	4	7
(South Africa) Keith Malcolm	7	6	1	6
(Republic of Ireland) Joe Hackett	5	4	6	3
(South Africa) Bryan Woodroffe	6	6	6
(United Kingdom) Gerry Oakley	2	2	3
(Italy) Fausto Gardini	5	3	1
(Hungary) István Sikorszki	7	6	6
(Sweden) Staffan Stockenberg	6	6	6
(Iran) Matthew Mohtadi	2	4	2
(United States) John Ager	3	6	6	6
(France) Gil de Kermadec	6	2	3	3
(Belgium) Gino Mezzi	4	5	6	6
(Austria) Freddie Huber	6	7	4	8
(United States) Malcolm Fox	4	9	2
5	(United States) Gardnar Mulloy	6	11	6

Second round
(Denmark) K Nielsen	6	6	8
(South Africa) R Malcolm	1	1	6
(South Africa) B Woodroffe	5	6	6	6
(Hungary) I Sikorszki	7	1	0	3
(Sweden) S Stockenberg	7	8	6
(United States) J Ager	5	6	4
(Austria) A Huber	2	2	6	4
5	(United States) G Mulloy	6	6	3	6

Third round
(Denmark) K Nielsen	6	3	6	6
(South Africa) B Woodroffe	4	6	3	2
(Sweden) S Stockenberg	6	6	3	3	7
5	(United States) G Mulloy	4	3	6	6	9

Fourth round
(Denmark) K Nielsen	10	6	7
5	(United States) G Mulloy	8	3	5

==== Section 8 ====
First round
(Australia) Jack Arkinstall	3	4	6	6	6
(India) Naresh Kumar	6	6	3	2	2
(Netherlands) Fred Dehnert	6	6	3	6
Q	(Socialist Federal Republic of Yugoslavia) Ilija Panajotović	3	4	6	4
(Republic of Ireland) Cyril Kemp	6	6	3	8	2
(United Kingdom) Tony Pickard	3	8	6	6	6
(Philippines) Raymundo Deyro	8	6	8
(United Kingdom) Henry Billington	6	0	6
(Spain) Jaime Bartrolí	6	6	6
(Belgium) Ivan Devroe	3	2	2
(United States) Alexander Wellford	4	6	2	3
Q	(United Kingdom) Ivor Warwick	6	4	6	6
(France) Robert Abdesselam	6	6	6
(United Kingdom) Malcolm Gracie	3	4	4
(United Kingdom) Mike Davies	2	4	2
1	(Australia) Ken Rosewall	6	6	6

Second round
(Australia) J Arkinstall	6	6	6
(Netherlands) A Dehnert	1	3	1
(United Kingdom) A Pickard	2	3	0
(Philippines) R Deyro	6	6	6
(Spain) J Bartrolí	6	3	9	7	8
Q	(United Kingdom) I Warwick	8	6	7	5	10
(France) R Abdesselam	3	1	6	2
1	(Australia) K Rosewall	6	6	4	6

Third round
(Australia) J Arkinstall	7	2	4	6	6
(Philippines) R Deyro	5	6	6	3	2
Q	(United Kingdom) I Warwick	3	2	2
1	(Australia) K Rosewall	6	6	6

Fourth round
(Australia) J Arkinstall	6	6	1	1	2
1	(Australia) K Rosewall	4	3	6	6	6

Preceded by 1953 French Championships	Grand Slams; Men's singles	Succeeded by 1953 U.S. Championships
