= 1953 Australian Championships – Men's singles =

Men's singles
- 1953 Australian Championships

Final
- Champion: (Australia) Ken Rosewall
- Runner-up: (Australia) Mervyn Rose
- Score: 6–0, 6–3, 6–4

Details
- Draw: 32
- Seeds: 12

Events
Singles	men	women
Doubles	men	women
- Australian Championships

Third-seeded Ken Rosewall defeated Mervyn Rose 6–0, 6–3, 6–4 in the final to win the men's singles tennis title at the 1953 Australian Championships.

== Seeds ==
The seeded players are listed below. Ken Rosewall is the champion; others show the round in which they were eliminated.

1. (Australia) Mervyn Rose (finalist)
2. (United States) Vic Seixas (semifinals)
3. (Australia) Ken Rosewall (champion)
4. (Italy) Fausto Gardini (second round)
5. (Australia) Lew Hoad (second round)
6. (United States) Ham Richardson (quarterfinals)
7. (Australia) Geoffrey Brown (quarterfinals)
8. (United States) Straight Clark (quarterfinals)
9. (Australia) Don Candy (second round)
10. (Australia) Rex Hartwig (second round)
11. (Australia) Ian Ayre (semifinals)
12. (Australia) Neale Fraser (second round)

== Draw ==
=== Key ===
- Q = Qualifier
- WC = Wild card
- LL = Lucky loser
- r = Retired

=== Finals ===
Quarterfinals
1	(Australia) Mervyn Rose	8	6	1	8	7
6	(United States) Ham Richardson	10	4	6	6	5
(Australia) Clive Wilderspin	4	9	6	6
11	(Australia) Ian Ayre	6	11	1	8
3	(Australia) Ken Rosewall	6	6	6
8	(United States) Straight Clark	4	4	2
7	(Australia) Geoffrey Brown	4	4	5
2	(United States) Vic Seixas	6	6	7

Semifinals
1	(Australia) Mervyn Rose	4	4	6	6	6
11	(Australia) Ian Ayre	6	6	1	4	4
3	(Australia) Ken Rosewall	6	2	7	6
2	(United States) Vic Seixas	3	6	5	4

Final
1	(Australia) Mervyn Rose	0	3	4
3	(Australia) Ken Rosewall	6	6	6

=== Earlier rounds ===
==== Section 1 ====
First round
1	(Australia) Rose	6	6	6
(Australia) Green	0	1	1
(Australia) Quist	6	6	6
(Australia) Stewart	3	2	0
10	(Australia) Hartwig	6	3	6	6
(Australia) Molloy	2	6	3	1
6	(United States) Richardson	6	6	6
(Australia) Yates	4	3	2
5	(Australia) Hoad	7	6	6
(Australia) Kendall	5	3	3
(Australia) Wilderspin	6	6	6
(Australia) O'Brien	3	4	4
11	(Australia) Ayre	6	6	6
(Australia) Ryan	2	0	1
4	(Italy) Gardini	6	6	6
(Australia) Mason	1	2	1

Second round
1	(Australia) Rose	6	3	6	6
(Australia) Quist	4	6	2	3
10	(Australia) Hartwig	6	1	4	6	0
6	(United States) Richardson	4	6	6	4	6
5	(Australia) Hoad	7	2	7
(Australia) Wilderspin	9	6	9
11	(Australia) Ayre	6	8	9
4	(Italy) Gardini	3	6	7

Quarterfinals
1	(Australia) Rose	8	6	1	8	7
6	(United States) Richardson	10	4	6	6	5
(Australia) Wilderspin	4	9	6	6
11	(Australia) Ayre	6	11	1	8

Semifinals
1	(Australia) Rose	4	4	6	6	6
11	(Australia) Ayre	6	6	1	4	4

==== Section 2 ====
First round
3	(Australia) Rosewall	6	6	6
(Australia) Diggle	4	0	3
(Australia) Tregonning	4	7	8	3	6
(Australia) Tobin	6	5	6	6	4
9	(Australia) Candy	6	6	6
(Australia) Cawthorn	0	1	1
8	(United States) Clark	6	6	6
(Australia) Hawton	0	4	0
7	(Australia) Brown	7	6	6
(Australia) Rogers	5	2	0
(Australia) Arkinstall	6	6	7
(United Kingdom) Knight	0	0	5
12	(Australia) Fraser	6	6	6
(Australia) Harvey	0	0	0
2	(United States) Seixas	6	6	6
(Australia) Reid	2	4	1

Second round
3	(Australia) Rosewall	6	6	4	6
(Australia) Tregonning	2	3	6	3
9	(Australia) Candy	1	9	9	4
8	(United States) Clark	6	11	7	6
7	(Australia) Brown	6	6	6
(Australia) Arkinstall	3	2	4
12	(Australia) Fraser	4	0	4
2	(United States) Seixas	6	6	6

Quarterfinals
3	(Australia) Rosewall	6	6	6
8	(United States) Clark	4	4	2
7	(Australia) Brown	4	4	5
2	(United States) Seixas	6	6	7

Semifinals
3	(Australia) Rosewall	6	2	7	6
2	(United States) Seixas	3	6	5	4

Preceded by 1952 U.S. National Championships	Grand Slam men's singles	Succeeded by 1953 French Championships
