= 1953 Australian Championships =

- Date: 9–17 January 1953
- Edition: 41st
- Category: Grand Slam (ITF)
- Surface: Grass
- Location: Melbourne, Australia
- Venue: Kooyong Stadium

Champions

Men's singles
- (Australia) Ken Rosewall

Women's singles
- (United States) Maureen Connolly

Men's doubles
- (Australia) Lew Hoad / (Australia) Ken Rosewall

Women's doubles
- (United States) Maureen Connolly / (United States) Julia Sampson

Mixed doubles
- (United States) Julia Sampson / (United States) Rex Hartwig
- Australian Championships

The 1953 Australian Championships was a tennis tournament that took place on outdoor Grass courts at the Kooyong Stadium in Melbourne, Australia from 9 January to 17 January. It was the 41st edition of the Australian Championships (now known as the Australian Open), the 12th held in Melbourne, and the first Grand Slam tournament of the year. American Maureen Connolly won the women's singles, the first step towards the first Grand Slam by a woman. Australian Ken Rosewall won the men's singles title.

== Finals ==
=== Men's singles ===
(Australia) Ken Rosewall defeated (Australia) Mervyn Rose 6–0, 6–3, 6–4

=== Women's singles ===
(United States) Maureen Connolly defeated (United States) Julia Sampson 6–3, 6–2

=== Men's doubles ===
(Australia) Lew Hoad / (Australia) Ken Rosewall defeated (Australia) Don Candy / (Australia) Mervyn Rose 9–11, 6–4, 10–8, 6–4

=== Women's doubles ===
(United States) Maureen Connolly / (United States) Julia Sampson defeated (Australia) Mary Bevis Hawton / (Australia) Beryl Penrose 6–4, 6–2

=== Mixed doubles ===
(United States) Julia Sampson / (Australia) Rex Hartwig defeated (United States) Maureen Connolly / (United States) Ham Richardson 6–4, 6–3

Preceded by 1952 U.S. National Championships	Grand Slams	Succeeded by 1953 French Championships
