= 1952 U.S. National Championships – Women's singles =

Women's singles
- 1952 U.S. National Championships

Final
- Champion: (United States) Maureen Connolly
- Runner-up: (United States) Doris Hart
- Score: 6–3, 7–5

Details
- Seeds: 12

Events
Singles	men	women
Doubles	men	women
- U.S. National Championships

First-seeded and defending champion Maureen Connolly defeated Doris Hart 6–3, 7–5 in the final to win the women's singles tennis title at the 1952 U.S. National Championships.

== Seeds ==
The tournament used two lists for seeding the women's singles event; one for U.S. players and one for foreign players. Maureen Connolly is the champion; others show in brackets the round in which they were eliminated.

1. (United States) Maureen Connolly (champion)
2. (United States) Doris Hart (finalist)
3. (United States) Shirley Fry (semifinals)
4. (United States) Louise Brough (semifinals)
5. (United States) Nancy Kiner (quarterfinals)
6. (United States) Anita Kanter (third round)
1. (Australia) Thelma Coyne Long (quarterfinals)
2. (France) Nelly Adamson (first round)
3. (United Kingdom) Angela Mortimer (quarterfinals)
4. (United Kingdom) Helen Fletcher (third round)
5. (Mexico) Melita Ramírez (first round)
6. (Japan) Sachiko Kamo (first round)

== Draw ==
=== Key ===
- Q = Qualifier
- WC = Wild card
- LL = Lucky loser
- r = Retired

=== Final eight ===
Quarterfinals
2	(United States) Doris Hart	6	6
(3)	(United Kingdom) Angela Mortimer	3	2
4	(United States) Louise Brough	6	6
(1)	(Australia) Thelma Coyne Long	4	2
1	(United States) Maureen Connolly	6	6
5	(United States) Nancy Kiner	3	0
3	(United States) Shirley Fry	6	6
2	(United States) Baba Lewis	3	2

Semifinals
1	(United States) Doris Hart	9	8
4	(United States) Louise Brough	7	6
1	(United States) Maureen Connolly	4	6	6
3	(United States) Shirley Fry	6	4	1

Finals
2	(United States) Doris Hart	3	5
1	(United States) Maureen Connolly	6	7

Preceded by 1952 Wimbledon Championships – Women's singles	Grand Slam women's singles	Succeeded by 1953 Australian Championships – Women's singles
