= 1953 Wimbledon Championships =

- Date: 22 June – 4 July
- Edition: 67th
- Category: Grand Slam
- Surface: Grass
- Location: Church Road; SW19, Wimbledon, London, United Kingdom
- Venue: All England Lawn Tennis and Croquet Club

Champions

Men's singles
- (United States) Vic Seixas

Women's singles
- (United States) Maureen Connolly

Men's doubles
- (Australia) Lew Hoad / (Australia) Ken Rosewall

Women's doubles
- (United States) Shirley Fry / (United States) Doris Hart

Mixed doubles
- (United States) Vic Seixas / (United States) Doris Hart

Boys' singles
- (United Kingdom) Billy Knight

Girls' singles
- (South Africa) Dora Kilian
← 1952 ·	Wimbledon Championships	· 1954 →

The 1953 Wimbledon Championships took place on the outdoor grass courts at the All England Lawn Tennis and Croquet Club in Wimbledon, London, United Kingdom. The tournament was held from Monday 22 June until Saturday 4 July 1953. It was the 67th staging of the Wimbledon Championships, and the third Grand Slam tennis event of 1953. Vic Seixas and Maureen Connolly won the singles titles.

== Finals ==
=== Seniors ===
==== Men's singles ====
(United States) Vic Seixas defeated (Denmark) Kurt Nielsen, 9–7, 6–3, 6–4

==== Women's singles ====
(United States) Maureen Connolly defeated (United States) Doris Hart 8–6, 7–5

==== Men's doubles ====
(Australia) Lew Hoad / (Australia) Ken Rosewall defeated (Australia) Rex Hartwig / (Australia) Mervyn Rose, 6–4, 7–5, 4–6, 7–5

==== Women's doubles ====
(United States) Shirley Fry / (United States) Doris Hart defeated (United States) Maureen Connolly / (United States) Julia Sampson, 6–0, 6–0

==== Mixed doubles ====
(United States) Vic Seixas / (United States) Doris Hart defeated (Argentina) Enrique Morea / (United States) Shirley Fry, 9–7, 7–5

=== Juniors ===
==== Boys' singles ====
(United Kingdom) Billy Knight defeated (India) Ramanathan Krishnan, 7–5, 6–4

==== Girls' singles ====
(South Africa) Dora Kilian defeated (United Kingdom) Valerie Pitt, 6–4, 4–6, 6–1

Preceded by 1953 French Championships	Grand Slams	Succeeded by 1953 U.S. National Championships
