= 1953 Wimbledon Championships – Women's singles =

Women's singles
- 1953 Wimbledon Championships

Final
- Champion: (United States) Maureen Connolly
- Runner-up: (United States) Doris Hart
- Score: 8–6, 7–5

Details
- Draw: 96 (10 Q )
- Seeds: 8

Events
Singles	men	women		boys	girls
Doubles	men	women	mixed	boys	girls
← 1952 ·	Wimbledon Championships	· 1954 →

Maureen Connolly successfully defended her title, defeating Doris Hart in the final, 8–6, 7–5 to win the ladies' singles tennis title at the 1953 Wimbledon Championships.

== Seeds ==
1. (United States) Maureen Connolly (champion)
2. (United States) Doris Hart (final)
3. (United States) Shirley Fry (semifinals)
4. (United States) Dorothy Knode (semifinals)
5. (United Kingdom) Angela Mortimer (quarterfinals)
6. (United Kingdom) Helen Fletcher (fourth round)
7. (France) Susan Chatrier (third round)
8. (France) Nelly Adamson (fourth round)

Click on the seed number of a player to go to their draw section.

== Draw ==
=== Key ===
- Q = Qualifier
- WC = Wild card
- LL = Lucky loser
- Alt = Alternate
- SE = Special exempt
- PR = Protected ranking
- ITF = ITF entry
- JE = Junior exempt
- w/o = Walkover
- r = Retired
- d = Defaulted
- SR = Special ranking

=== Finals ===
Quarterfinals
2	(United States) Doris Hart	7	7
(Hungary) Zsuzsa Körmöczy	5	5
4	(United States) Dorothy Knode	6	6
5	(United Kingdom) Angela Mortimer	4	3
(United States) Julie Sampson	4	2
3	(United States) Shirley Fry	6	6
(West Germany) Erika Vollmer	3	0
1	(United States) Maureen Connolly	6	6

Semifinals
2	(United States) Doris Hart	6	6
4	(United States) Dorothy Knode	2	2
3	(United States) Shirley Fry	1	1
1	(United States) Maureen Connolly	6	6

Final
2	(United States) Doris Hart	6	5
1	(United States) Maureen Connolly	8	7

=== Top half ===
==== Section 1 ====
First round

Second round
2	(United States) Doris Hart	6	6
(United Kingdom) Janet Morgan	0	0
(United Kingdom) Margot Gordon	5	4
(West Germany) Toto Zehden	7	6
(United Kingdom) Angela Buxton	7	5	6
(United Kingdom) Thelma Lister	5	7	1
Q	(Southern Rhodesia) Joan Bowyer	3	3
(Australia) Anne Goldsworthy	6	6

Third round
2	(United States) D Hart	6	6
(West Germany) T Zehden	0	0
(United Kingdom) A Buxton	6	6
(Australia) A Goldsworthy	4	2

Fourth round
2	(United States) D Hart	6	6
(United Kingdom) A Buxton	3	1

==== Section 2 ====
First round

Second round
6	(United Kingdom) Helen Fletcher	6	6
Q	(United Kingdom) Diane Midgley	2	0
(Belgium) Christiane Mercelis	6	6
(United Kingdom) Bobbie Wilson	0	2
(United Kingdom) Elaine Watson	6	11
(United Kingdom) Enid Kerr	1	9
(United Kingdom) Audrey Houseley	0	0
(Hungary) Zsuzsa Körmöczy	6	6

Third round
6	(United Kingdom) H Fletcher	6	6
(Belgium) C Mercelis	3	3
(United Kingdom) E Watson	3	2
(Hungary) Z Körmöczy	6	6

Fourth round
6	(United Kingdom) H Fletcher	3	4
(Hungary) Z Körmöczy	6	6

==== Section 3 ====
First round
4	(United States) Dorothy Knode	6	6
(United Kingdom) Georgie Woodgate	2	2
Q	(United States) Karol Fageros	6	4	6
(United Kingdom) Valerie Pitt	1	6	1
(Australia) Margaret Fisher	2	1
(United States) Barbara Davidson	6	6
(Austria) Elizabeth Broz
(Sweden) Mary Lagerborg	w/o
(United Kingdom) Molly Blair	6	6
Q	(United Kingdom) Nancy Liebert	3	2
(United Kingdom) Rosemary Walsh	6	6
Q	(United Kingdom) Leonie Brighton	3	3
(United Kingdom) Peggy Dawson-Scott	6	2	9
(United Kingdom) Vera Thomas	4	6	7
Q	(United Kingdom) Shirley MacKay	2	6	7
Q	(United Kingdom) Rita Bentley	6	2	5

Second round
4	(United States) D Knode	8	6
Q	(United States) K Fageros	6	3
(United States) B Davidson	6	6
(Austria) E Broz	4	1
(United Kingdom) M Blair	2	6	7
(United Kingdom) R Walsh	6	2	9
(United Kingdom) P Dawson-Scott	6	6
Q	(United Kingdom) R Bentley	2	2

Third round
4	(United States) D Knode	6	6
(United States) B Davidson	3	0
(United Kingdom) R Walsh	2	7
(United Kingdom) P Dawson-Scott	6	9

Fourth round
4	(United States) D Knode	6	6
(United Kingdom) P Dawson-Scott	2	1

==== Section 4 ====
First round
5	(United Kingdom) Angela Mortimer	6	6
(United Kingdom) Rita Drobný	1	4
(France) Suzanne Schmitt	6	1	6
(South Africa) Joan Scott	0	6	1
(United Kingdom) Effie Peters	0	2
(United Kingdom) Pat Ward	6	6
(United Kingdom) Noelle Knight	3	7	7
(United Kingdom) Valerie Lewis	6	5	5
(Republic of Ireland) Betty Lombard	6	3	1
(United Kingdom) Hazel Cheadle	4	6	6
(United Kingdom) Joan MacLeod	7	6
(Spain) María Josefa de Riba	5	2
(United States) Anne Gray	4	3
(France) Michelle Bourbonnais	6	6
(United Kingdom) Viola White	6	3	6
(New Zealand) Evelyn Attwood	3	6	2

Second round
5	(United Kingdom) A Mortimer	2	6	6
(France) S Schmitt	6	0	1
(United Kingdom) P Ward	6	6
(United Kingdom) N Knight	0	1
(United Kingdom) H Cheadle	7	6
(United Kingdom) J MacLeod	5	1
(France) M Bourbonnais	6	6
(United Kingdom) V White	1	4

Third round
5	(United Kingdom) A Mortimer	6	6
(United Kingdom) P Ward	3	3
(United Kingdom) H Cheadle	6	6
(France) M Bourbonnais	4	4

Fourth round
5	(United Kingdom) A Mortimer	6	6
(United Kingdom) H Cheadle	2	1

=== Bottom half ===
==== Section 5 ====
First round
(United Kingdom) Laura Morgan	1	2
(Argentina) Mary Terán de Weiss	6	6
(United Kingdom) Sheila Speight	3	4
(Republic of Ireland) Maeve Downey	6	6
(United Kingdom) Pat Gotla	1	2
(United States) Julia Sampson	6	6
Q	(United Kingdom) Dorrit Herbst	4	7
(South Africa) Lucille van der Westhuizen	6	9
(United Kingdom) Joan Curry	6	6
(United Kingdom) Barbara Knapp	4	2
(Australia) Nell Hopman	6	5	6
(United Kingdom) Jenny Wagstaff	0	7	2
(United Kingdom) Rosemary Bulleid	4	6	6
(United Kingdom) Helen Proudfoot	6	1	2
(United Kingdom) Billie Woodgate	6	0	3
8	(France) Nelly Adamson	2	6	6

Second round
(Argentina) M Terán de Weiss	6	6
(Republic of Ireland) M Downey	3	1
(United States) J Sampson	6	6
(South Africa) L van der Westhuizen	1	3
(United Kingdom) J Curry	11	2	0^{r}
(Australia) E Hopman	9	6	1
(United Kingdom) R Bulleid	6	3	3
8	(France) N Adamson	1	6	6

Third round
(Argentina) M Terán de Weiss	9	5
(United States) J Sampson	11	7
(Australia) E Hopman	6	2	1
8	(France) N Adamson	1	6	6

Fourth round
(United States) J Sampson	4	6	6
8	(France) N Adamson	6	3	3

==== Section 6 ====
First round
(Netherlands) Fenny ten Bosch	6	4
(United Kingdom) Betty Dawes	8	6
(United States) Baba Lewis	8	6
(United Kingdom) Pat Harrison	6	3
(United Kingdom) Shirley Bloomer	7	6
(United Kingdom) Norma Potts	5	4
(Switzerland) Violette Alvensleben-Rigollet	4	6	6
(United Kingdom) Jennifer Middleton	6	4	3
(United Kingdom) Mary Harris	6	6
(United Kingdom) Marian Boundy	4	1
(United Kingdom) Margot Parker	6	2	4
(United Kingdom) Jean Rinkel-Quertier	2	6	6
(United Kingdom) Gladys Lines	6	0	6
(United Kingdom) Frances Walthew	2	6	8
(Sweden) Birgit Gullbrandsson-Sandén	w/o
3	(United States) Shirley Fry

Second round
(United Kingdom) B Dawes	1	3
(United States) B Lewis	6	6
(United Kingdom) S Bloomer	6	8
(Switzerland) V Alvensleben-Rigollet	4	6
(United Kingdom) M Harris	3	2
(United Kingdom) J Rinkel-Quertier	6	6
(United Kingdom) F Walthew	2	2
3	(United States) S Fry	6	6

Third round
(United States) B Lewis	6	6
(United Kingdom) S Bloomer	3	2
(United Kingdom) J Rinkel-Quertier	6	4	1
3	(United States) S Fry	3	6	6

Fourth round
(United States) B Lewis	1	3
3	(United States) S Fry	6	6

==== Section 7 ====
First round

Second round
(Austria) Helga Strecker	2	6	6
Q	(United Kingdom) Joyce Reid	6	1	4
(United Kingdom) Pat Hird	3	3
(West Germany) Erika Vollmer	6	6
(United Kingdom) Margaret Carlisle	2	1
(Bermuda) Heather Brewer	6	6
(United Kingdom) Gem Hoahing	1	3
7	(France) Susan Chatrier	6	6

Third round
(Austria) H Strecker	2	2
(West Germany) E Vollmer	6	6
(Bermuda) H Brewer	7	6
7	(France) S Chatrier	5	3

Fourth round
(West Germany) E Vollmer	6	6
(Bermuda) H Brewer	2	1

==== Section 8 ====
First round

Second round
(United Kingdom) Phyllis King	3	2
(United Kingdom) Anne Shilcock	6	6
(Hungary) Márta Peterdy-Wolf	6	4	6
(Belgium) Janine de Ridder	4	6	4
(United Kingdom) Jean Petchell	6	6
Q	(United Kingdom) Sidney Brock	4	1
(South Africa) Dora Kilian	0	0
1	(United States) Maureen Connolly	6	6

Third round
(United Kingdom) A Shilcock	6	6
(Hungary) M Peterdy-Wolf	2	0
(United Kingdom) J Petchell	1	1
1	(United States) M Connolly	6	6

Fourth round
(United Kingdom) A Shilcock	0	1
1	(United States) M Connolly	6	6

Preceded by 1953 French Championships – Women's singles	Grand Slam women's singles	Succeeded by 1953 U.S. National Championships – Women's singles
