= Julia Sampson Hayward =

American tennis player

- Full name: Julia Anne Sampson Hayward
- Country (sports): United States
- Born: February 2, 1934 Los Angeles, California, US
- Died: December 27, 2011 (aged 77) Newport Beach, California, US
- Retired: 1958

Singles

Grand Slam singles results
- Australian Open: F (1953)
- French Open: 3R (1953)
- Wimbledon: QF (1953)
- US Open: 3R (1952)

Doubles

Grand Slam doubles results
- Australian Open: W (1953)
- French Open: F (1953)
- Wimbledon: F (1953)

Grand Slam mixed doubles results
- Australian Open: W (1953)
- US Open: F (1953)

Julia Ann Sampson Hayward (née Sampson; February 2, 1934 – December 27, 2011) was a female tennis player from the United States who was active in the 1950s. She won two Grand Slam titles in doubles.

== Tennis career ==
As the second seeded foreign player, Sampson reached the singles final of the 1953 Australian Championships, losing to Maureen Connolly in straight sets.

Sampson and Rex Hartwig teamed to win the mixed doubles title at the 1953 Australian Championships, defeating Connolly and Ham Richardson in the final 6–4, 6–3. Sampson and Hartwig reached the mixed doubles final at the 1953 U.S. Championships, losing to Doris Hart and Vic Seixas 6–2, 4–6, 6–4.

Connolly and Sampson teamed to win the women's doubles title at the 1953 Australian Championships, defeating Mary Bevis Hawton and Beryl Penrose in the final 6–4, 6–2. At both the French Championships and Wimbledon in 1953, Connolly and Sampson lost in the final to Doris Hart and Shirley Fry Irvin. The score in the Wimbledon final was 6–0, 6–0, which was the only double bagel in the history of Wimbledon women's doubles finals until the 2017 championships. At the 1953 U.S. Championships, Connolly and Sampson once more lost to Hart and Irvin, again in the final 6–4, 6–3.

Sampson was ranked tenth in the year-end rankings issued by the United States Lawn Tennis Association for 1952 and 1953.

== Personal life ==
She married Daniel Hayward in 1958 and the couple, who later divorced, had three children.

== Grand Slam finals ==
=== Singles (1 runner-up) ===
| Result | Year | Championship | Surface | Opponent | Score |
|---|---|---|---|---|---|
| Loss | 1953 | Australian Championships | Grass | (United States) Maureen Connolly | 3–6, 2–6 |

=== Doubles (1 title - 2 runner-up) ===
| Result | Year | Championship | Surface | Partner | Opponents | Score |
|---|---|---|---|---|---|---|
| Win | 1953 | Australian Championships | Grass | (United States) Maureen Connolly | (Australia) Mary Hawton (Australia) Beryl Penrose | 6–4, 6–2 |
| Loss | 1953 | French Championships | Clay | (United States) Maureen Connolly | (United States) Shirley Fry (United States) Doris Hart | 4–6, 3–6 |
| Loss | 1953 | Wimbledon | Grass | (United States) Maureen Connolly | (United States) Shirley Fry (United States) Doris Hart | 0–6, 0–6 |

=== Mixed doubles (1 title, 1 runner-up) ===
| Result | Year | Championship | Surface | Partner | Opponents | Score |
|---|---|---|---|---|---|---|
| Win | 1953 | Australian Championships | Grass | (Australia) Rex Hartwig | (United States) Maureen Connolly (United States) Ham Richardson | 6–4, 6–3 |
| Loss | 1953 | U.S. Championships | Grass | (Australia) Rex Hartwig | (United States) Doris Hart (United States) Vic Seixas | 2–6, 6–4, 4–6 |

== Grand Slam singles tournament timeline ==
Key
| W | F | SF | QF | #R | RR | Q# | DNQ | A | NH |

(W) winner; (F) finalist; (SF) semifinalist; (QF) quarterfinalist; (#R) rounds 4, 3, 2, 1; (RR) round-robin stage; (Q#) qualification round; (DNQ) did not qualify; (A) absent; (NH) not held; (SR) strike rate (events won / competed); (W–L) win–loss record.

| Tournament | 1951 | 1952 | 1953 | Career SR |
|---|---|---|---|---|
| Australian Championships | A | A | F | 0 / 1 |
| French Championships | A | A | 3R | 0 / 1 |
| Wimbledon | A | A | QF | 0 / 1 |
| U.S. Championships | 1R | 3R | 1R | 0 / 3 |
| SR | 0 / 1 | 0 / 1 | 0 / 4 | 0 / 6 |

== See also ==
- Performance timelines for all female tennis players since 1978 who reached at least one Grand Slam final
