= 1953 French Championships – Women's singles =

Tennis tournament

Women's singles
- 1953 French Championships

Final
- Champion: (United States) Maureen Connolly
- Runner-up: (United States) Doris Hart
- Score: 6–2, 6–4

Details
- Draw: 48
- Seeds: 16

Events
Singles	men	women
Doubles	men	women
← 1952 ·	French Championships	· 1954 →

Maureen Connolly defeated defending champion Doris Hart in the final 6–2, 6–4, to win the women's singles tennis title at the 1953 French Championships. With this win, Connolly became the first woman to complete the Career Grand Slam in Women's singles.

== Seeds ==
The seeded players are listed below. Maureen Connolly is the champion; others show the round in which they were eliminated.

1. (United States) Maureen Connolly (champion)
2. (United States) Doris Hart (finalist)
3. (United States) Shirley Fry (semifinals)
4. (United States) Baba Mercedes Lewis (first round)
5. (United States) Dorothy Head (semifinals)
6. (United Kingdom) Angela Mortimer (third round)
7. (United Kingdom) Jean Rinkel-Quertier (quarterfinals)
8. (France) Susan Chatrier (quarterfinals)
9. (United States) Ann Gray (third round)
10. (United States) Julia Sampson (third round)
11. (France) Nelly Adamson (quarterfinals)
12. (United Kingdom) Helen Fletcher (third round)
13. (France) Ginette Bucaille (quarterfinals)
14. (Italy) Silvana Lazzarino (third round)
15. (United Kingdom) Anne Shilcock (third round)
16. (France) Raymonde Jones-Veber (third round)

== Draw ==
=== Key ===
- Q = Qualifier
- WC = Wild card
- LL = Lucky loser
- r = Retired

=== Finals ===
Quarterfinals
1	(United States) Maureen Connolly	3	6	6
8	(France) Susan Chatrier	6	2	2
13	(France) Ginette Bucaille	3	0
5	(United States) Dorothy Head	6	6
11	(France) Nelly Adamson	1	6	0
3	(United States) Shirley Fry	6	4	6
7	(United Kingdom) Jean Rinkel-Quertier	3	3
2	(United States) Doris Hart	6	6

Semifinals
1	(United States) Maureen Connolly	6	6
5	(United States) Dorothy Head	3	3
3	(United States) Shirley Fry	6	4
2	(United States) Doris Hart	8	6

Finals
1	(United States) Maureen Connolly	6	6
2	(United States) Doris Hart	2	4

=== Earlier rounds ===
==== Section 1 ====
First round

Second round
1	(United States) Connolly	6	6
(Belgium) Mercelis	1	3
16	(France) Jones-Veber	0	6	8
(Switzerland) Alvensleben	6	2	6
8	(France) Chatrier	6	6
(Belgium) Coessens	3	2
9	(United States) Gray	6	6
(France) Bourbonnais	4	2

Third round
1	(United States) Connolly	6	6
16	(France) Jones-Veber	3	1
8	(France) Chatrier	8	7
9	(United States) Gray	6	5

Quarterfinals
1	(United States) Connolly	3	6	6
8	(France) Chatrier	6	2	2

==== Section 2 ====
First round
4	(United States) Lewis
(France) Haillet-Passet
(France) Salvet	6	8
(Spain) Barril	4	6
13	(France) Bucaille	6	6
(Australia) Hopman	1	2
(France) Amouretti	3	2
(United States) Fageros	6	6
5	(United States) Head	6	6
(France) Soisbault	0	0
(France) Patorni	1	6	4
(Netherlands) Ten Bosch	6	3	6
(France) Lemal	6	6	4
(France) Varin	8	1	6
12	(United Kingdom) Fletcher	6	6
(France) Kermina	0	0

Second round
(France) Haillet-Passet	1	1
(France) Salvet	6	6
13	(France) Bucaille	3	6	6
(United States) Fageros	6	2	1
5	(United States) Head	6	6
(Netherlands) Ten Bosch	3	2
(France) Varin	2	3
12	(United Kingdom) Fletcher	6	6

Third round
(France) Salvet	6	2	0
13	(France) Bucaille	2	6	6
5	(United States) Head	6	6
12	(United Kingdom) Fletcher	1	3

Quarterfinals
13	(France) Bucaille	6	6
5	(United States) Head	3	0

==== Section 3 ====
First round
11	(France) Adamson	6	6
(France) Halff	1	2
(France) Brunon	9	6	6
(Belgium) Isaac	11	2	4
(United Kingdom) Walter	6	6
(United States) Herr	0	2
(Italy) Migliori	1	6	9
6	(United Kingdom) Mortimer	6	2	11
(France) Dubois	3	6	11
14	(Italy) Lazzarino	6	3	13
(United Kingdom) Carlisle	3	3
(France) Gimault	6	6
(France) Galtier	0	0
(United Kingdom) Curry	6	6
(France) Schmitt	3	3
3	(United States) Fry	6	6

Second round
11	(France) Adamson
(France) Brunon
(United Kingdom) Walter	0	0
6	(United Kingdom) Mortimer	6	6
14	(Italy) Lazzarino	6	6	6
(France) Gimault	8	4	0
(United Kingdom) Curry	8	4
3	(United States) Fry	10	6

Third round
11	(France) Adamson	6	6
6	(United Kingdom) Mortimer	2	3
14	(Italy) Lazzarino	2	0
3	(United States) Fry	6	6

Quarterfinals
11	(France) Adamson	6	4	6
3	(United States) Fry	1	6	0

==== Section 4 ====
First round

Second round
10	(United States) Sampson	7	6
(Switzerland) Charbonnier	5	2
(France) Billaz	4	2
7	(United Kingdom) Rinkel-Quertier	6	6
(Germany) Vollmer-Obst	4	5
15	(United Kingdom) Shilcock	6	7
(France) De La Giroday	2	3
2	(United States) Hart	6	6

Third round
10	(United States) Sampson	4	2
7	(United Kingdom) Rinkel-Quertier	6	6
15	(United Kingdom) Shilcock	2	3
2	(United States) Hart	6	6

Quarterfinals
7	(United Kingdom) Rinkel-Quertier	6	6
2	(United States) Hart	3	3

Preceded by 1953 Australian Championships – Women's singles	Grand Slam women's singles	Succeeded by 1953 Wimbledon Championships – Women's singles
