= Don Black (tennis) =

Rhodesian tennis player (1927–2000)

Donald Black
- Country (sports): Southern Rhodesia
- Born: 2 December 1927; Hartley, Southern Rhodesia
- Died: 19 October 2000 (aged 72); Zimbabwe

Singles

Grand Slam singles results
- French Open: 2R (1956)
- Wimbledon: 3R (1953, 1956)

Donald Lachlan Moore Black (2 December 1927 – 19 October 2000) was a Rhodesian tennis player.

== Early life ==
Black was born in Hartley (now Chegutu), to an English mother and Scottish father.

== Career ==
Black made his Wimbledon debut in 1953 and defeated Czeslaw Spychala in the opening round. He came from two sets down to beat John Horn in the second round and was then eliminated from the tournament by Belgium's Jacques Brichant. Another Belgian, Jacques Peten, beat Black in the first round of the 1954 Wimbledon Championships. Black reached the third round of Wimbledon again in 1956, with wins over Gerald Oakley and Oliver Prenn, the latter in five sets. He had four match points against Australian Ashley Cooper in the third round but lost the final set 7–9. The following year he returned to Wimbledon for what would be the final time and he lost in the first round, to Emilio Martinez.

The Rhodesian also competed twice at the French Championships. In 1956 he won his first round match against Ecuador's Wladimir Lerque, in five sets, then lost to fourth seed Art Larsen. He lost in the opening round of the 1963 French Championships to Abe Segal.

== Family ==
Black, who worked as a high school teacher after leaving tennis, was the father of Byron, Cara and Wayne Black, all professional tennis players. He coached them himself on the four grass courts and one hard court that he had built in the backyard of his 22-acre avocado farm. The siblings would win a total of 13 Grand Slam doubles titles.

== Death ==
Black died on 19 October 2000, following complications from surgery. He had been suffering bowel cancer.
