= 1953 Wimbledon Championships – Girls' singles =

Girls' singles
- 1953 Wimbledon Championships

Final
- Champion: (South Africa) Dora Kilian
- Runner-up: (United Kingdom) Valerie Pitt
- Score: 6–4, 4–6, 6–1

Details
- Draw: 13

Events
Singles	men	women		boys	girls
Doubles	men	women	mixed	boys	girls
← 1952 ·	Wimbledon Championships	· 1954 →

Fenny ten Bosch was the defending champion, but lost in the quarterfinals to Margot Dittmeyer.

Dora Kilian defeated Valerie Pitt in the final, 6–4, 4–6, 6–1 to win the girls' singles tennis title at the 1953 Wimbledon Championships.

== Draw ==
=== Key ===
- Q = Qualifier
- WC = Wild card
- LL = Lucky loser
- Alt = Alternate
- SE = Special exempt
- PR = Protected ranking
- ITF = ITF entry
- JE = Junior exempt
- w/o = Walkover
- r = Retired
- d = Defaulted
- SR = Special ranking

=== Draw ===
First round
(Netherlands) Fenny ten Bosch
(Republic of Ireland) Mary O'Sullivan
(South Africa) Dora Kilian	6	6
(Norway) E Gahr	0	2
(Sweden) Ulla Hultkrantz	7	6
(Austria) E Biermayer	5	2
(Southern Rhodesia) Joan Bowyer	6	6
(Belgium) F Ferris	2	3
(France) C Brunon	4	7	6
(India) Rita Davar	6	5	3

Quarterfinals
(West Germany) Margot Dittmeyer	5	9	6
(Netherlands) Fenny ten Bosch	7	7	2
(South Africa) Dora Kilian	6	6
(Sweden) Ulla Hultkrantz	1	0
(Southern Rhodesia) Joan Bowyer	6	2	5
(France) C Brunon	3	6	7
(United Kingdom) Valerie Pitt	8	6
(Switzerland) M Blaser	6	4

Semifinals
(West Germany) Margot Dittmeyer	7	3	7
(South Africa) Dora Kilian	5	6	9
(France) C Brunon	4	4
(United Kingdom) Valerie Pitt	6	6

Final
(South Africa) Dora Kilian	6	4	6
(United Kingdom) Valerie Pitt	4	6	1
