= Anne Shilcock =

British tennis player (1932–2019)

Anne Shilcock Spann
- Full name: Jacqueline Anne Shilcock Spann
- Country (sports): United Kingdom
- Born: 13 June 1932; Hartfield, England, U.K.
- Died: April 2019 (aged 86); South Africa

Singles

Grand Slam singles results
- French Open: 3R (1953)
- Wimbledon: 4R (1953)
- US Open: 3R (1957)

Doubles

Grand Slam doubles results
- Wimbledon: W (1955)

Grand Slam mixed doubles results
- Wimbledon: 4R (1956, 1958, 1960)

Jacqueline Anne Shilcock (later Spann, 13 June 1932 – April 2019) was a British tennis player who was active in the 1950s.

She won 1955 Wimbledon Championships in women's doubles with Angela Mortimer, becoming the first all-British team to win since 1937.

== Career ==
She played singles in the Wightman Cup in 1954, losing to Doris Hart and Maureen Connolly, and doubles in 1953 with Angela Mortimer, in 1957 with Ann Haydon, and in 1958 with Pat Ward, the year Britain won for the first time since 1930.

Shilcock was a forceful and effective attacking doubles player, especially but by no means exclusively on fast courts, in 1953 winning the Lyons doubles with Susan Partridge Chatrier, Monte Carlo with Pat Ward, reaching the quarterfinals of the French Championships doubles with Mortimer and the mixed with Destremau, with Mortimer reaching the semifinals of Wimbledon, the final of the Eastern Grass Court tournament, taking a set from Doris Hart and Shirley Fry, and winning the British Covered Court Championships doubles. In 1954 she won the Scandinavian Covered Courts doubles with Mortimer, the French Covered Courts and Lyons doubles with Susan Partridge Chatrier and reached the final of the British Hard Courts doubles with Helen Fletcher. She and Angela Mortimer, seeded 3, reached the semifinals at Wimbledon. In America, playing with Helen Fletcher, she reached the semifinals of the US nationals, the finals of the Eastern and Essex tournaments and won the Maidstone. In mixed doubles, she reached the quarterfinals of the Nationals and won the Pacific Coast.

In 1955, she won the Pierre Gillou doubles with Susan Partridge Chatrier, beating Pat Ward and Angela Buxton, and the Scandinavian Covered Courts with Angela Mortimer with whom she lost the final of the British Hard Courts championships to Shirley Bloomer Brasher and Pat Ward Hales, a result triumphantly reversed in the Wimbledon final later in the year. With Robert (Bob) Howe, she won the mixed in the British Hard Courts Championships and in the Northern Tournament at Manchester where she also won the doubles with Louise Brough. She won the doubles and mixed with Pat Ward Hales and Billy Knight in the British Covered courts championships at the end of the year.

In 1956, she again won the Pierre Gillou doubles with Chatrier and the Scandinavian with Angela Mortimer, beating Althea Gibson and Joan Johnson. She also won the doubles at the Northern Manchester with Dorothy Knode, beating Angelas Buxton and Mortimer and Thelma Long and Betty Pratt. She and Angela Mortimer lost their Wimbledon title in the semifinals, losing to Fay Miller and Daphne Seeney: nonetheless this was the fourth consecutive year that the pair had reached the semifinals or beyond. She won the Coup Canet Paris with Pat Ward, the British Covered Courts championship doubles with Pat Ward, beating Shirley Bloomer and Angela Buxton and the mixed with Geoff Paish.

In 1957, Shilcock won the German Covered Courts Championships with Pat Ward, beating Thelma Long and Erika Vollmer and won the mixed with legend Budge Patty in Monte Carlo. She and Pat Ward were narrowly beaten in the final of the British Hard Courts championships by Shirley Bloomer and Darlene Hard.

In 1958, she won doubles in the British Covered Courts and Hard Courts Championships, where she also won the mixed. With Pat Ward she beat Sandra Reynolds and Renee Schuurman in an International match vs South Africa. They also reached the quarterfinals at Wimbledon, losing to Thelma Long and Mary Hawton. In 1959 she and Susan Partridge Chatrier reached the quarterfinals at Wimbledon, losing rather easily to eventual champions Darlene Hard and Jeanne Arth. For 7 out of the 8 years from 1953 to 1959 inclusive, she had reached at least the quarterfinal of this event.

Shilcock was also a fine singles player. She reached the last 16 of the French Championships in 1953 (as 15th seed, beating Erika Vollmer and losing to Doris Hart), of the Wimbledon championships in the same year (losing to Maureen Connolly) and of the US Nationals in 1954 (losing again to Doris Hart).

She was especially effective on covered courts, in singles as well as doubles, reaching the final of the Scandinavian championships in 1955, losing to Angela Mortimer, reaching the semifinals in 1956, losing to Althea Gibson and winning it in 1957 by beating Thelma Long and Angela Mortimer. That year Shilcock also won the German Covered Courts title, beating Thelma Long and Christiane Mercelis (who had beaten Pat Ward). She won the British Covered Courts title in 1955 beating Pat Ward, then US finalist, 6–2, 6–4, reached the final by beating Shirley Bloomer in straight sets in 1956, losing to Angela Buxton, and won it again in 1958, beating Pat Ward and the young Christine Truman. In 56 she won the Pierre Gillou beating Susan Chatrier and beat Pat Ward to win Coup Canet Paris

She was also good on grass. In 1953, she reached the last 8 of the Eastern Grass Court tournament beating fourth seed Helen Perez before losing in three sets to Angela Mortimer, and in 1954 reached the same stage of the same tournament and the semifinal of the Essex County Tournament.

Also on grass, Shilcock had some notable wins in the Manchester Northern tournament, reaching the quarterfinals in 1954 before losing to Maureen Connolly, in 1955 the semifinal, losing to Lousie Brough, in 56 beating Sandra Reynolds, Betty Pratt and losing in three sets to Dorothy Knode in the quarterfinal. In 1957, she reached the final, losing to Althea Gibson and in 1958 beat Thelma Long, Dorothy Knode and Janet Hopps to reach the semifinal where she again lost to Althea Gibson.

Surbiton was another grass court tournament where she played well. In 1954, she beat Angela Mortimer in straight sets to reach the semifinals, where she only lost in a three-set match to Shirley Fry. In 1956 Shilcock reached the final, beating that year's Wimbledon finalist Angela Buxton, and extended Althea Gibson to 6–3, 13–11. In the same year she also extended Gibson at Wimbledon, taking a set from her in the 3rd round after beating the young Ann Haydon (Jones) in three sets. At Beckenham in 1955, she took Louise Brough to three sets in the semifinal.

On hard courts Shilcock reached the quarterfinals of the British Hard Court Championships four times: in 1953 (losing to Shirley Fry), in 1955, in 56 (beating the young Christine Truman and losing to Darlene Hard) and 1958 (losing to Truman in three sets). On one occasion she reached the semifinal, in 1957, beating Truman 6–2, 6–2 again. She lost to Shirley Bloomer. She was also semifinalist in the 1956 German Championships and in the 1957 Monte Carlo tournament. On high bouncing cement she reached the final of the Pacific Coast Championships in 1954.

Her last appearance at Wimbledon was in 1960 when she lost to 2nd seed Darlene Hard in the second round in two sets. As Mrs Spann, she won the professional championships at Eastbourne.

== Personal life ==
Shilcock married J. K. Spann in 1960, and lived in South Africa for the last 40 years of her life. She died there in late April 2019, at the age of 86.

== Grand slam finals ==
=== Doubles (1 title) ===
Result	Year	Championship	Surface	Partner	Opponents	Score
Win	1955	Wimbledon	Grass	(United Kingdom) Angela Mortimer	(United Kingdom) Shirley Bloomer (United Kingdom) Patricia Ward Hales	7–5, 6–1

== Grand Slam singles tournament timeline ==
Key
W	F	SF	QF	#R	RR	Q#	DNQ	A	NH

(W) winner; (F) finalist; (SF) semifinalist; (QF) quarterfinalist; (#R) rounds 4, 3, 2, 1; (RR) round-robin stage; (Q#) qualification round; (DNQ) did not qualify; (A) absent; (NH) not held; (SR) strike rate (events won / competed); (W–L) win–loss record.

Tournament	1953	1954	1955	1956	1957	1958	1959	1960	Career SR
Australian Championships	A	A	A	A	A	A	A	A	0 / 0
French Championships	3R	A	A	A	A	A	A	A	0 / 1
Wimbledon	4R	3R	3R	3R	2R	1R	1R	2R	0 / 8
US Championships	A	A	A	A	3R	A	A	A	0 / 1
SR	0 / 2	0 / 1	0 / 1	0 / 1	0 / 2	0 / 1	0 / 1	0 / 1	0 / 8
