= Gianni Clerici =

Italian tennis player, commentator, and journalist (1930–2022)

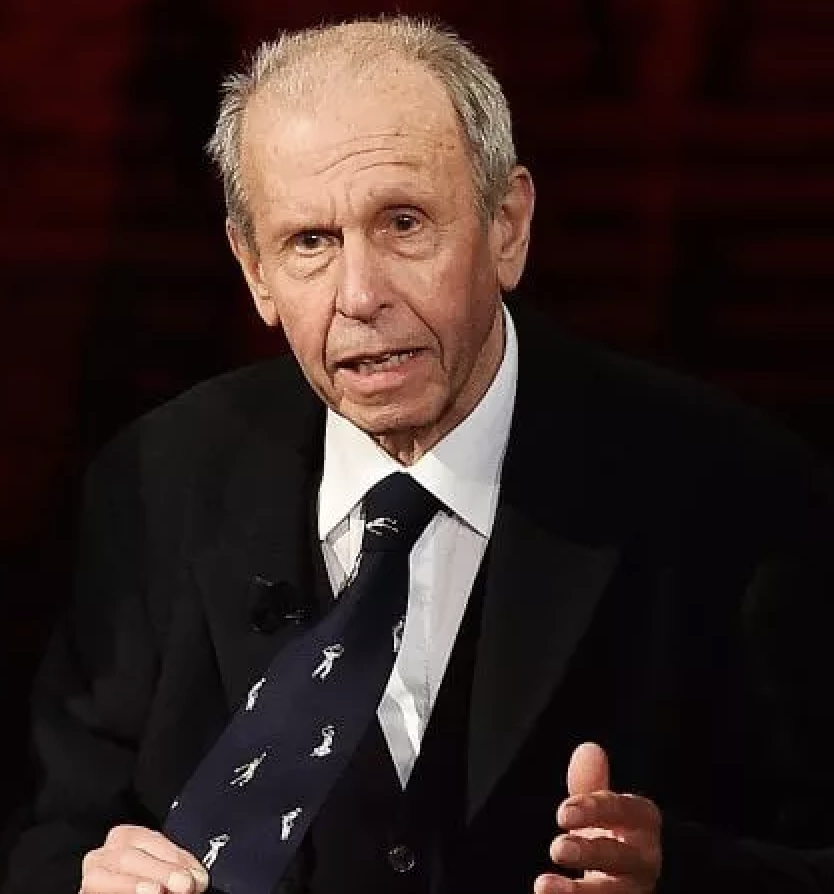
- Clerici in the 2000s
- Born: 24 July 1930; Como, Lombardy, Italy
- Died: 6 June 2022 (aged 91); Bellagio, Lombardy, Italy
- Occupations: Tennis player; journalist; sports commentator
- Years active: 1951–2022

Gianni Clerici (24 July 1930 – 6 June 2022) was an Italian tennis commentator, journalist, author and tennis player.

Clerici was born in Como, Italy.

Clerici was known for his often off-topic banter with partner Rino Tommasi. As a tennis player, one highlight of his career was being part of the main draw at Wimbledon in 1953. He is the author of several books on tennis and was inducted into the International Tennis Hall of Fame in 2006.
