= Clive Wilderspin =

Australian tennis player

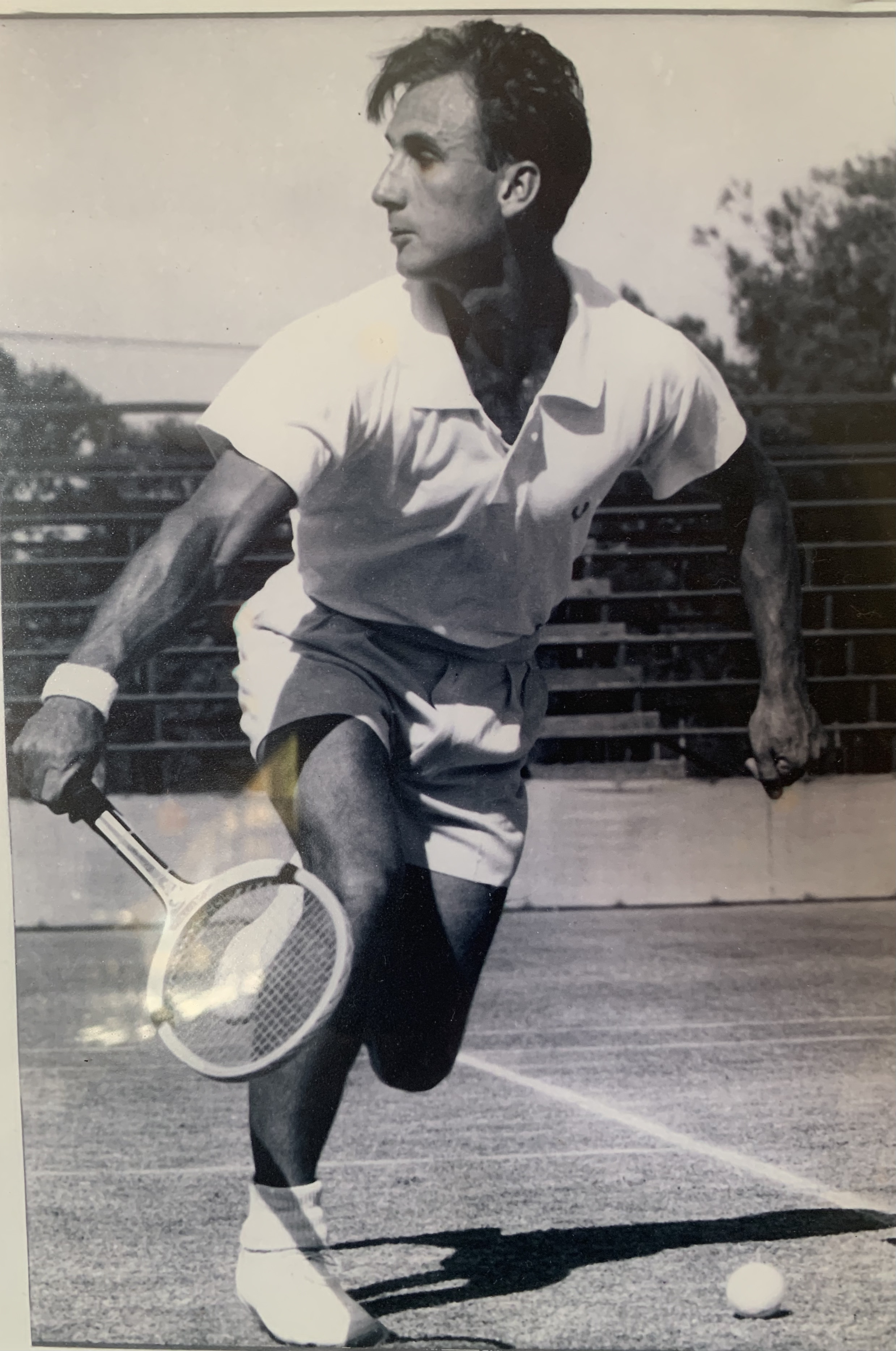
- Full name: Clive Eric Wilderspin
- Country (sports): Australia
- Born: 3 April 1930 Perth, Western Australia
- Died: 13 November 2021 (aged 91) Australia

Grand Slam singles results
- Australian Open: QF (1953)
- French Open: 2R (1953)
- Wimbledon: 3R (1953)
- US Open: 2R (1953

Grand Slam doubles results
- Australian Open: F (1954)
- French Open: F (1953)
- Wimbledon: 2R (1953)

Grand Slam mixed doubles results
- Australian Open: SF (1954)
- Wimbledon: 2R (1953)

Clive Eric Wilderspin, OAM (3 April 1930 – 13 November 2021) was an Australian former tennis player who was active from the late 1940s until the mid-1950s.

== Tennis career ==
Wilderspin began playing at age nine and joined Hensman Park club when he was 11. Until 1946 he was coached by his father Eric, an engineer by profession. He was ranked No. 1 in Western Australia from 1946 to 1963. In 1949, Wilderspin won the Australian Boys' Singles and Doubles championships and was the dominant player in the Western Australian team that won the Linton Cup for the junior interstate competition.

Wilderspin's best singles result at a Grand Slam tournament was reaching the quarterfinal round at the 1953 Australian Championships, in which he lost to Ian Ayre in four sets. That year Wilderspin was part of the Australian team that toured internationally and participated in the Grand Slam tournaments. At the 1953 French Championships he reached the second round in the singles where he was beaten by Staffan Stockenberg. In the doubles event he teamed up with Mervyn Rose to finish as runner-ups after losing the final to teenagers Ken Rosewall and Lew Hoad. He was beaten in the third round of the 1953 Wimbledon Championships in three sets by his countryman Ayre. At the U.S. National Championships he defeated Atsushi Miyagi in the first round of the singles event but lost in the second in four sets to Art Larsen.

Wilderspin and Hoad won the doubles title at the Dutch Championships in July 1953, defeating Enrique Morea and Hans van Swol in the final in four sets.

In 1954, Wilderspin partnered Neale Fraser in the doubles event of the Australian Championships. They reached the final in which they were beaten in three straight sets by their compatriots Rex Hartwig and Mervyn Rose.

Wilderspin was named Australian Tennis Veteran of the Year in 1979. He was inducted into the Western Australian Hall of Champions in 1988.

Wilderspin was awarded a Medal of the Order of Australia (OAM) in the 2021 Australia Day Honours for "service to tennis."

== Grand Slam finals ==
=== Doubles: (2 runner-ups) ===
Result	Year	Championship	Surface	Partner	Opponents	Score
Loss	1953	French Championships	Clay	(Australia) Mervyn Rose	(Australia) Lew Hoad (Australia) Ken Rosewall	2–6, 1–6, 1–6
Loss	1954	Australian Championships	Grass	(Australia) Neale Fraser	(Australia) Rex Hartwig (Australia) Mervyn Rose	3–6, 4–6, 2–6

== Personal life ==
On 11 September 1954 he married Enid Bott in Perth.
