= 1952 U.S. National Championships (tennis) =

- Date: 29 August – 8 September
- Edition: 72nd
- Category: Grand Slam (ILTF)
- Surface: Grass
- Location: Chestnut Hill, Massachusetts; Forest Hills, Queens, New York City; United States
- Venue: Longwood Cricket Club; West Side Tennis Club

Champions

Men's singles
- (Australia) Frank Sedgman

Women's singles
- (United States) Maureen Connolly

Men's doubles
- (Australia) Mervyn Rose / (United States) Vic Seixas

Women's doubles
- (United States) Shirley Fry / (United States) Doris Hart

Mixed doubles
- (United States) Doris Hart / (Australia) Frank Sedgman
- U.S. National Championships

The 1952 U.S. National Championships (now known as the US Open) was a tennis tournament that took place on the outdoor grass courts at the West Side Tennis Club, Forest Hills in New York City, New York. The tournament ran from 29 August until 8 September. It was the 72nd staging of the U.S. National Championships, and the fourth Grand Slam tennis event of the year.

== Finals ==
=== Men's singles ===
(Australia) Frank Sedgman defeated (United States) Gardnar Mulloy 6–1, 6–2, 6–3

=== Women's singles ===
(United States) Maureen Connolly defeated (United States) Doris Hart 6–3, 7–5

=== Men's doubles ===
(Australia) Mervyn Rose / (United States) Vic Seixas defeated (Australia) Ken McGregor / (Australia) Frank Sedgman 3–6, 10–8, 10–8, 6–8, 8–6

=== Women's doubles ===
(United States) Shirley Fry / (United States) Doris Hart defeated (United States) Louise Brough / (United States) Maureen Connolly 10–8, 6–4

=== Mixed doubles ===
(United States) Doris Hart / (Australia) Frank Sedgman defeated (Australia) Thelma Coyne Long / (Australia) Lew Hoad 6–3, 7–5

Preceded by 1952 Wimbledon Championships	Grand Slams	Succeeded by 1953 Australian Championships
