= 1953 French Championships – Men's singles =

Men's singles
- 1953 French Championships

Final
- Champion: (Australia) Ken Rosewall
- Runner-up: (United States) Vic Seixas
- Score: 6–3, 6–4, 1–6, 6–2

Details
- Draw: 110
- Seeds: 16

Events
Singles	men	women
Doubles	men	women
← 1952 ·	French Championships	· 1954 →

Third-seeded Ken Rosewall defeated Vic Seixas 6–3, 6–4, 1–6, 6–2 in the final to win the men's singles tennis title at the 1953 French Championships.

== Seeds ==
The seeded players are listed below. Ken Rosewall is the champion; others show the round in which they were eliminated.

1. (Egypt) Jaroslav Drobný (semifinals)
2. (United States) Gardnar Mulloy (quarterfinals)
3. (Australia) Ken Rosewall (champion)
4. (Australia) Lew Hoad (quarterfinals)
5. (United States) Vic Seixas (final)
6. (United States) Budge Patty (fourth round)
7. (Australia) Mervyn Rose (fourth round)
8. (Italy) Fausto Gardini (quarterfinals)
9. (United States) Bernard Bartzen (fourth round)
10. (Argentina) Enrique Morea (semifinals)
11. (Philippines) Felicisimo Ampon (quarterfinals)
12. (Sweden) Sven Davidson (fourth round)
13. (France) Paul Rémy (third round)
14. (Sweden) Torsten Johansson (third round)
15. (Philippines) Raymundo Deyro (fourth round)
16. (Italy) Giovanni Cucelli (second round)

== Draw ==
=== Key ===
- Q = Qualifier
- WC = Wild card
- LL = Lucky loser
- r = Retired

=== Finals ===
Quarterfinals
1	(Egypt) Jaroslav Drobný	6	6	1	6
8	(Italy) Fausto Gardini	3	1	6	4
4	(Australia) Lew Hoad	3	3	4
5	(United States) Vic Seixas	6	6	6
11	(Philippines) Felicisimo Ampon	2	1	1
3	(Australia) Ken Rosewall	6	6	6
10	(Argentina) Enrique Morea	6	6	8	6
2	(United States) Gardnar Mulloy	8	3	6	3

Semifinals
1	(Egypt) Jaroslav Drobný	3	2	6	3
5	(United States) Vic Seixas	6	6	3	6
3	(Australia) Ken Rosewall	2	6	6	0	6
10	(Argentina) Enrique Morea	6	2	4	6	2

Final
5	(United States) Vic Seixas	3	4	6	2
3	(Australia) Ken Rosewall	6	6	1	6

=== Earlier rounds ===
==== Section 1 ====
First round

Second round
1	(Egypt) Drobný	6	6	6
(France) Bouteleux	1	0	0
(Socialist Federal Republic of Yugoslavia) Petrovic	5	1	1
(France) Ducos De La Haille	7	6	6
(United Kingdom) Starte	4	1	2
(Brazil) Vieira	6	6	6
16	(Italy) Cucelli	6	5	5
(Australia) Hartwig	8	7	7

Third round
1	(Egypt) Drobný	6	6	6
(France) Ducos De La Haille	4	3	2
(Brazil) Vieira	6	5	5
(Australia) Hartwig	8	7	7

Fourth round
1	(Egypt) Drobný	6	2	6	6
(Australia) Hartwig	2	6	4	2

==== Section 2 ====
First round
(United States) Van Voorhees	6	7	2	6
(Socialist Federal Republic of Yugoslavia) Panajotovic	3	5	6	3
(France) Freling
(France) Grinda
(South Africa) Kupferburger	6	6	6
(France) Matton	4	1	3
(Germany) Sanders	3	4	7	8	4
(Australia) Wilderspin	6	6	5	6	6
(France) Dessair
(Sweden) Stockenberg
(France) Hode
9	(United States) Bartzen
(Egypt) Sursock	3	1	3
(France) Berthet	6	6	6

Second round
8	(Italy) Gardini	6	6	6
(United States) Van Voorhees	1	3	3
(France) Grinda	6	6	6
(South Africa) Kupferburger	0	3	4
(Australia) Wilderspin	3	2	6	1
(Sweden) Stockenberg	6	6	2	6
9	(United States) Bartzen	6	6	6
(France) Berthet	2	1	1

Third round
8	(Italy) Gardini	6	6	6
(France) Grinda	4	2	1
(Sweden) Stockenberg	2	6	2	0
9	(United States) Bartzen	6	3	6	6

Fourth round
8	(Italy) Gardini	2	6	4	6	6
9	(United States) Bartzen	6	3	6	4	4

==== Section 3 ====
First round
4	(Australia) Hoad	6	6	3	6
(France) Larcade	1	4	6	1
(France) Jalabert	6	7	6
(United States) Wellford	4	6	4
(Monaco) Pasquier	2	4	2
(France) Molinari	6	6	6
(France) Desq	6	4	7	0	5
(Socialist Federal Republic of Yugoslavia) Plećević	0	6	5	6	7
13	(France) Remy	6	6	6
(Netherlands) Van Dalsum	1	2	1
(South Africa) Woodroffe	6	6	6
(France) Laval	4	4	4
(Italy) Merlo
(United States) Cullum
(France) Lemyze	6	6	6
(France) Delhomme	2	2	2

Second round
4	(Australia) Hoad	4	6	6	6
(France) Jalabert	6	4	0	0
(France) Molinari	6	6	6
(Socialist Federal Republic of Yugoslavia) Plećević	2	1	1
13	(France) Rémy	7	6	6
(South Africa) Woodroffe	5	4	3
(Italy) Merlo	6	6	6
(France) Lemyze	1	2	4

Third round
4	(Australia) Hoad	6	3	2	6	6
(France) Molinari	1	6	6	0	1
13	(France) Rémy	2	2	2
(Italy) Merlo	6	6	6

Fourth round
4	(Australia) Hoad	6	6	6
(Italy) Merlo	1	4	2

==== Section 4 ====
First round
5	(United States) Seixas	6	6	6
(Colombia) Rodriguez	0	2	0
(United States) Davis
(Italy) Del Bello
(France) Jamain	1	2	2
(France) Destremau	6	6	6
(France) Thomas	6	6	6	1	2
(France) Lemasson	1	3	8	6	6
12	(Sweden) Davidson	6	7	7
(France) Favieres	2	5	5
(United Kingdom) Paish
(France) Rodel
(Egypt) Zalzal
(France) Bernard
(France) Thieullent	7	6	6
(United States) Cohen	5	0	2

Second round
5	(United States) Seixas	6	6	5	6
(Italy) Del Bello	1	2	7	3
(France) Destremau	6	6	6
(France) Lemasson	2	1	0
12	(Sweden) Davidson	6	6	6
(United Kingdom) Paish	3	3	2
(France) Bernard	6	6	2	9
(France) Thieullent	4	3	6	7

Third round
5	(United States) Seixas	6	6	6
(France) Destremau	1	1	1
12	(Sweden) Davidson	6	1
(France) Bernard	2	0	r

Fourth round
5	(United States) Seixas	6	6	6
12	(Sweden) Davidson	1	4	4

==== Section 5 ====
First round
(United States) John	1	1	1
(France) Grandet	6	6	6
(France) Gentien
(France) Haillet
(Belgium) Devroe	6	1	3	9	3
(France) Perreau-Saussine	3	6	6	7	6
11	(Philippines) Ampon	6	6	6
(Colombia) Zeppenfeldt	2	1	1
(Belgium) Toussaint	8	3	1	3
(France) Schaff	6	6	6	6
(France) Nys	6	7	6
(France) Feret	4	5	3
(Italy) Bergamo	6	7	7
(France) Chatrier	2	5	5
(Switzerland) Herzog
6	(United States) Patty

Second round
(France) Grandet
(France) Haillet
(France) Perreau-Saussine	0	6	2	1
11	(Philippines) Ampon	6	4	6	6
(France) Schaff	2	4	3
(France) Nys	6	6	6
(Italy) Bergamo	3	6	3	2
6	(United States) Patty	6	4	6	6

Third round
(France) Grandet	1	3	3
11	(Philippines) Ampon	6	6	6
(France) Nys	3	4	4
6	(United States) Patty	6	6	6

Fourth round
11	(Philippines) Ampon	6	6	6
6	(United States) Patty	4	2	4

==== Section 6 ====
First round
(Poland) Skonecki	7	6	7
(France) Weiss	5	1	5
(Italy) Sirola	6	6	3	6
(United Kingdom) Butler	4	4	6	4
(United States) Pine	0	0	1
(France) De Kermadec	6	6	6
14	(Sweden) Johansson	6	7	6
(France) Malosse	3	5	4
(South Africa) Seymour	6	6	6	6
(France) Mey	8	0	0	2
(France) Pellizza	6	6	6
(Pakistan) Rauf	2	1	0
(Italy) Scribani	6	6	6
(United States) Dunklin	1	3	2
(France) Boussus	1	1	1
3	(Australia) Rosewall	6	6	6

Second round
(Poland) Skonecki	6	6	6	7
(Italy) Sirola	8	1	2	5
(France) De Kermadec	3	7	6	3
14	(Sweden) Johansson	6	9	1	6
(South Africa) Seymour	5	1	3
(France) Pellizza	7	6	6
(Italy) Scribani	1	3	3
3	(Australia) Rosewall	6	6	6

Third round
(Poland) Skonecki	6	6	6
14	(Sweden) Johansson	1	2	2
(France) Pellizza	0	3	0
3	(Australia) Rosewall	6	6	6

Fourth round
(Poland) Skonecki	2	3	2
3	(Australia) Rosewall	6	6	6

==== Section 7 ====
First round
(United States) Cody	0	2	0
(France) Jauffret	6	6	6
(Germany) Hermann	6	6	6
(United Kingdom) Rivkind	2	1	4
(Belgium) Peten	6	6	8
(Uruguay) Argon	3	4	6
10	(Argentina) Morea	6	6	6
(Switzerland) Sturdza	2	0	2
(Italy) Valerio	1	2	1
(South Africa) Vermaak	6	6	6
(France) Abdesselam
(Switzerland) Buser
(United States) Fox
(Socialist Federal Republic of Yugoslavia) Milojkovic

Second round
(France) Jauffret	3	2	r
(Germany) Hermann	6	6
(Belgium) Peten	2	3	0
10	(Argentina) Morea	6	6	6
(South Africa) Vermaak	1	3	5
(France) Abdesselam	6	6	7
(Socialist Federal Republic of Yugoslavia) Milojkovic	1	7	3
7	(Australia) Rose	6	9	6

Third round
(Germany) Hermann	3	4	2
10	(Argentina) Morea	6	6	6
(France) Abdesselam	3	5	6	2
7	(Australia) Rose	6	7	4	6

Fourth round
10	(Argentina) Morea	6	8	3	6	6
7	(Australia) Rose	3	6	6	8	3

==== Section 8 ====
First round

Second round
15	(Philippines) Deyro	8	6	4
(Socialist Federal Republic of Yugoslavia) Pallada	6	3	6	r
(Australia) Ayre	6	6	6
(Italy) Del Bello	4	4	2
(France) Pilet
(Australia) Hopman
(Belgium) Mezzi	2	1	2
2	(United States) Mulloy	6	6	6

Third round
15	(Philippines) Deyro	4	6	6	6
(Australia) Ayre	6	0	2	3
(France) Pilet	2	3	4
2	(United States) Mulloy	6	6	6

Fourth round
15	(Philippines) Deyro	6	6	3	3
2	(United States) Mulloy	8	4	6	6

Preceded by 1953 Australian Championships – Men's singles	Grand Slam men's singles	Succeeded by 1953 Wimbledon Championships – Men's singles
