= 1953 Australian Championships – Women's singles =

Women's singles
- 1953 Australian Championships

Final
- Champion: (United States) Maureen Connolly
- Runner-up: (United States) Julia Sampson
- Score: 6–3, 6–2

Details
- Draw: 25
- Seeds: 10

Events
Singles	men	women
Doubles	men	women
- Australian Championships

First-seeded Maureen Connolly defeated Julia Sampson 6–3, 6–2 in the final to win the women's singles tennis title at the 1953 Australian Championships.

== Seeds ==
The seeded players are listed below. Maureen Connolly is the champion; others show the round in which they were eliminated.

1. (United States) Maureen Connolly (champion)
2. (United States) Julia Sampson (finalist)
3. (Australia) Helen Angwin (quarterfinals)
4. (Australia) Mary Hawton (semifinals)
5. (Australia) Beryl Penrose (quarterfinals)
6. (Australia) Pam Southcombe (quarterfinals)
7. (Australia) Alison Baker (second round)
8. (Australia) Dorn Fogarty (semifinals)
9. (Australia) Nell Hall Hopman (quarterfinals)
10. (Australia) Gwen Thiele (second round)

== Draw ==
=== Key ===
- Q = Qualifier
- WC = Wild card
- LL = Lucky loser
- r = Retired

=== Finals ===
Quarterfinals
4	(Australia) Mary Hawton	6	6
9	(Australia) Hopman	1	2
6	(Australia) Pam Southcombe	0	1
1	(United States) Maureen Connolly	6	6
2	(United States) Julia Sampson	6	6
5	(Australia) Beryl Penrose	2	2
8	(Australia) Dorn Fogarty	6	5	6
3	(Australia) Helen Angwin	4	7	2

Semifinals
4	(Australia) Mary Hawton	2	1
1	(United States) Maureen Connolly	6	6
2	(United States) Julia Sampson	3	6	6
8	(Australia) Dorn Fogarty	6	3	4

Finals
1	(United States) Maureen Connolly	6	6
2	(United States) Julia Sampson	3	2

=== Earlier rounds ===
==== Section 1 ====
First round
(Australia) Muller	6	6
(Australia) Warnock	2	2
6	(Australia) Southcombe	6	6
(Australia) Ruffin	2	3
(Australia) Donoghue	9	8
(Australia) Midgley	7	6
7	(Australia) Baker	6	6
(Australia) Ryan	3	2
1	(United States) Connolly	6	6
(Australia) Borelli	0	1

Second round
4	(Australia) Hawton	6	8	6
(Australia) Nichols	1	10	1
9	(Australia) Hopman	6	4	6
(Australia) Muller	3	6	4
6	(Australia) Southcombe	6	6
(Australia) Donoghue	1	0
7	(Australia) Baker	1	0
1	(United States) Connolly	6	6

Quarterfinals
4	(Australia) Hawton	6	6
9	(Australia) Hopman	1	2
6	(Australia) Southcombe	0	1
1	(United States) Connolly	6	6

Semifinals
4	(Australia) Hawton	2	1
1	(United States) Connolly	6	6

==== Section 2 ====
First round
2	(United States) Sampson	6	6
(Australia) Rich	3	4
10	(Australia) Thiele	6	6
(Australia) Schultz	3	0
(Australia) Wallis	7	6
(Australia) Diggle	5	1
5	(Australia) Penrose	6	6
(Australia) Occleshaw	3	4

Second round
2	(United States) Sampson	6	6
10	(Australia) Thiele	2	1
(Australia) Wallis	1	0
5	(Australia) Penrose	6	6
(Australia) Staley	4	6	3
8	(Australia) Fogarty	6	2	6
(Australia) Ellis	5	6	4
3	(Australia) Angwin	7	1	6

Quarterfinals
2	(United States) Sampson	6	6
5	(Australia) Penrose	2	2
8	(Australia) Fogarty	6	5	6
3	(Australia) Angwin	4	7	2

Semifinals
2	(United States) Sampson	3	6	6
8	(Australia) Fogarty	6	3	4

Preceded by 1952 U.S. National Championships – Women's singles	Grand Slam women's singles	Succeeded by 1953 French Championships – Women's singles
