= Ian Ayre (tennis) =

Australian tennis player

- Full name: Ian George Ayre
- Country (sports): Australia
- Born: 18 August 1929 Brisbane, Queensland, Australia
- Died: 12 October 1991 (aged 62) Brisbane, Queensland, Australia
- Turned pro: 1955 (amateur tour from 1946)

Grand Slam singles results
- Australian Open: SF (1953)
- French Open: 3R (1953)
- Wimbledon: 4R (1953)
- US Open: 4R (1953)

Grand Slam doubles results
- Australian Open: QF (1952)

Grand Slam mixed doubles results
- Australian Open: SF (1952)

Ian Ayre (18 August 1929 – 12 October 1991) was an Australian tennis player. He was educated at the Anglican Church Grammar School.

Ayre was a contemporary of Frank Sedgman (1927), George Worthington (1928), Don Tregonning (1928), Rex Hartwig (1929), Ken McGregor (1929) and Mervyn Rose (1930). He was on the Australian Davis Cup team in 1951, 1952, and 1953, but never played in a match. In 1953 he reached the fourth round at Wimbledon, losing to Sven Davidson in straight sets, and the semifinals of the Australian Open, losing to Mervyn Rose in five sets.

He turned pro in 1955 and subsequently became a coach in Queensland. In the early 1960s Ayer coached tennis at Mayfield State School (a Primary School) in Brisbane. In 1969 he supervised the Davis Cup team when the captain, Neale Fraser, was temporarily unable to. In 1975 he won the first Veterans' Open Tournament of the Gold Coast and District Tennis Association at Queens Park Tennis Centre. According to a video interview with Fay Toyne about the history of Milton tennis centre in Brisbane, Ayre died of a heart attack whilst on a tennis court. His Sydney Morning Herald obituary states he was involved in a doubles match when he died.
