= 1953 French Championships (tennis) =

- Date: 20–31 May 1953
- Edition: 52
- Category: 23rd Grand Slam (ITF)
- Surface: Clay
- Location: Paris (XVI^{e}), France
- Venue: Stade Roland Garros

Champions

Men's singles
- (Australia) Ken Rosewall

Women's singles
- (United States) Maureen Connolly

Men's doubles
- (Australia) Lew Hoad / (Australia) Ken Rosewall

Women's doubles
- (United States) Doris Hart / (United States) Shirley Fry

Mixed doubles
- (United States) Doris Hart / (United States) Vic Seixas
- French Championships

The 1953 French Championships (now known as the French Open) was a tennis tournament that took place on the outdoor clay courts at the Stade Roland-Garros in Paris, France. The tournament ran from 20 May to 31 May. It was the 57th staging of the French Championships, and the second Grand Slam tennis event of 1953. Ken Rosewall and Maureen Connolly won the singles titles.

== Finals ==
=== Men's singles ===
(Australia) Ken Rosewall defeated (United States) Vic Seixas 6–3, 6–4, 1–6, 6–2

=== Women's singles ===
(United States) Maureen Connolly defeated (United States) Doris Hart 6–2, 6–4

=== Men's doubles ===
(Australia) Lew Hoad / (Australia) Ken Rosewall defeated (Australia) Mervyn Rose / (Australia) Clive Wilderspin 6–2, 6–1, 6–1

=== Women's doubles ===
(United States) Shirley Fry / (United States) Doris Hart defeated (United States) Maureen Connolly / (United States) Julia Sampson 6–4, 6–3

=== Mixed doubles ===
(United States) Doris Hart / (Australia) Vic Seixas defeated (United States) Maureen Connolly / (Australia) Mervyn Rose 4–6, 6–4, 6–0

Preceded by 1953 Australian Championships	Grand Slams	Succeeded by 1953 Wimbledon Championships
