= 1953 U.S. National Championships – Women's singles =

Women's singles
- 1953 U.S. National Championships

Final
- Champion: (United States) Maureen Connolly
- Runner-up: (United States) Doris Hart
- Score: 6–2, 6–4

Details
- Seeds: 8

Events
Singles	men	women
Doubles	men	women
- U.S. National Championships

Two-time defending champion Maureen Connolly defeated Doris Hart in the final, 6–2, 6–4 to win the women's singles tennis title at the 1953 U.S. National Championships. With the win, she became the first woman in history to complete the Grand Slam. Connolly won the tournament without losing a set.

== Seeds ==
The seeded players are listed below. Maureen Connolly is the champion; others show in brackets the round in which they were eliminated.

1. (United States) Maureen Connolly (champion)
2. (United States) Doris Hart (finalist)
3. (United States) Shirley Fry (semifinals)
4. (United States) Louise Brough (semifinals)
5. (United States) Margaret Osborne duPont (quarterfinals)
6. (United States) Althea Gibson (quarterfinals)
7. (United States) Helen Perez (quarterfinals)
8. (United States) Babara Lewis (third round)

== Draw ==
=== Key ===
- Q = Qualifier
- WC = Wild card
- LL = Lucky loser
- r = Retired

=== Final eight ===
Quarterfinals
1	(United States) Maureen Connolly	6	6
6	(United States) Althea Gibson	3	2
5	(United States) Margaret Osborne duPont	6	5
3	(United States) Shirley Fry	8	7
7	(United States) Helen Perez	6	3
4	(United States) Louise Brough	8	6
(United Kingdom) Jean Rinkel-Quertier	0	1
2	(United States) Doris Hart	6	6

Semifinals
1	(United States) Maureen Connolly	6	6
3	(United States) Shirley Fry	1	1
4	(United States) Louise Brough	2	4
2	(United States) Doris Hart	6	6

Finals
1	(United States) Maureen Connolly	6	6
2	(United States) Doris Hart	2	4

Preceded by 1953 Wimbledon Championships – Women's singles	Grand Slam women's singles	Succeeded by 1954 Australian Championships – Women's singles
