= Dorothy Head Knode =

American tennis player

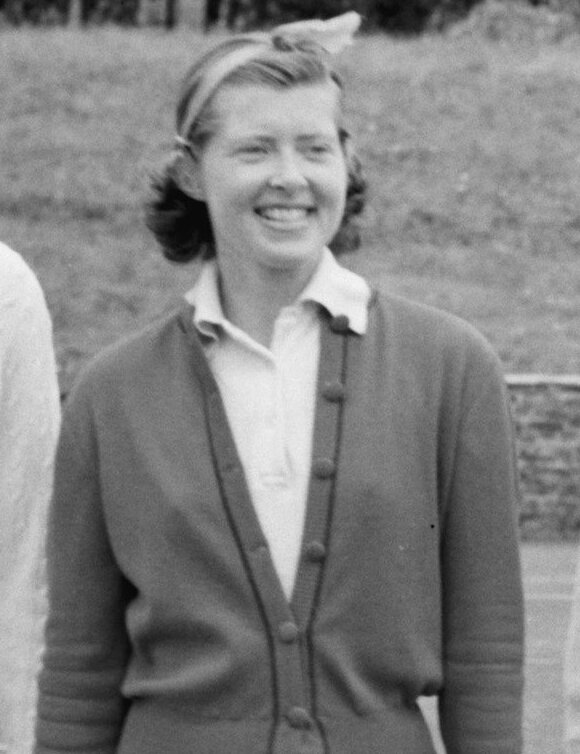
- Country (sports): United States
- Born: July 4, 1925 Richmond, California, U.S.
- Died: October 25, 2015 (aged 90) Novato, California, U.S.
- Plays: Right-handed

Singles
- Career record: 661-220 (75%)
- Career titles: 89
- Highest ranking: No. 5 (1955, 1957)

Grand Slam singles results
- French Open: F (1955, 1957)
- Wimbledon: SF (1953, 1957)
- US Open: SF (1955, 1957)

Grand Slam doubles results
- French Open: F (1956)

Grand Slam mixed doubles results
- French Open: 2R (1967)

Alice Dorothy Head Knode (née Head; July 4, 1925 – October 25, 2015), also known as Dottie Head Knode, was an American tennis player who reached the women's singles final of the French International Championships in 1955, losing to Angela Mortimer in three sets, and 1957, losing to Shirley Bloomer in straight sets. She reached the semifinals of six other Grand Slam singles tournaments from 1952 through 1957.

== Career ==
In 1948, she won the singles title at the Cincinnati Open (then known as the Tri-State Championships) after defeating Mercedes Madden Lewis in the final in straight sets. Knode won the singles title at the German Championships in 1950, 1952, and 1953. She also won the singles title at the U.S. Women's Clay Court Championships in 1951, 1955, 1958, and 1960 and the bronze medal at the 1959 Pan American Games in Chicago. She and partner Darlene Hard were the runners-up in women's doubles at the 1956 French International Championships, losing to the team of Althea Gibson and Angela Buxton 6–8, 8–6, 6–1.

According to Lance Tingay of The Daily Telegraph and the Daily Mail, Knode was ranked in the world top 10 in 1952, 1953, 1955, 1957, and 1958 (no rankings issued from 1940 through 1945), reaching a career high of World No. 5 in those rankings in 1955 and 1957. Knode was included in the year-end top 10 rankings issued by the United States Lawn Tennis Association in 1943, 1944, 1946, 1947, 1949, 1951, and 1956 through 1959. She was the third-ranked United States player in 1957 and 1959.

Her other career singles highlights include winning the Alexandria International Championships in Alexandria, Egypt in 1958.

In October 2008, Knode was still active in international and national senior events. She won the 80-and-over Super-Seniors World Individual Championships in Antalya, Turkey in 2005.

She died in Novato, California, in October 2015 at the age of 90 after suffering from arthritis and Alzheimer's.

== Grand Slam finals ==
=== Singles: (2 runner-ups) ===
Result	Year	Championship	Surface	Opponent	Score
Loss	1955	French Championships	Clay	(United Kingdom) Angela Mortimer	6–2, 5–7, 8–10
Loss	1957	French Championships	Clay	(United Kingdom) Shirley Bloomer	1–6, 3–6

=== Doubles (1 runner-up) ===
Result	Year	Championship	Surface	Partner	Opponents	Score
Loss	1956	French Championships	Clay	(United States) Darlene Hard	(United Kingdom) Angela Buxton (United States) Althea Gibson	8–6, 6–8, 1–6

== Grand Slam singles tournament timeline ==
Key
W	F	SF	QF	#R	RR	Q#	DNQ	A	NH

(W) winner; (F) finalist; (SF) semifinalist; (QF) quarterfinalist; (#R) rounds 4, 3, 2, 1; (RR) round-robin stage; (Q#) qualification round; (DNQ) did not qualify; (A) absent; (NH) not held; (SR) strike rate (events won / competed); (W–L) win–loss record.

Tournament	1943	1944	1945	1946^{1}	1947^{1}	1948	1949	1950	1951	1952	1953	1954	1955	1956	1957	1958	1959	1960	1961	1962	1963	1964	1965	1966	1967	1968	1969	Career SR
Australian Championships	NH	NH	NH	A	A	A	A	A	A	A	A	A	A	A	A	A	A	A	A	A	A	A	A	A	A	A	A	0 / 0
French Championships	R	R	A	A	A	A	A	3R	A	SF	SF	A	F	3R	F	QF	A	A	A	A	A	A	A	3R	1R	A	1R	0 / 10
Wimbledon	NH	NH	NH	A	A	A	A	4R	A	4R	SF	A	QF	2R	SF	2R	A	3R	A	A	3R	A	A	2R	1R	A	A	0 / 11
U.S. Championships	QF	2R	1R	QF	QF	3R	2R	A	3R	A	A	1R	SF	QF	SF	QF	QF	A	A	4R	A	A	A	A	A	A	A	0 / 15
SR	0 / 1	0 / 1	0 / 1	0 / 1	0 / 1	0 / 1	0 / 1	0 / 2	0 / 1	0 / 2	0 / 2	0 / 1	0 / 3	0 / 3	0 / 3	0 / 3	0 / 1	0 / 1	0 / 0	0 / 1	0 / 1	0 / 0	0 / 0	0 / 2	0 / 2	0 / 0	0 / 1	0 / 36

R = tournament restricted to French nationals and held under German occupation.

^{1}In 1946 and 1947, the French Championships were held after Wimbledon.

== See also ==
- Performance timelines for all female tennis players since 1978 who reached at least one Grand Slam final
