= Maureen Connolly =

American tennis player (1934–1969)

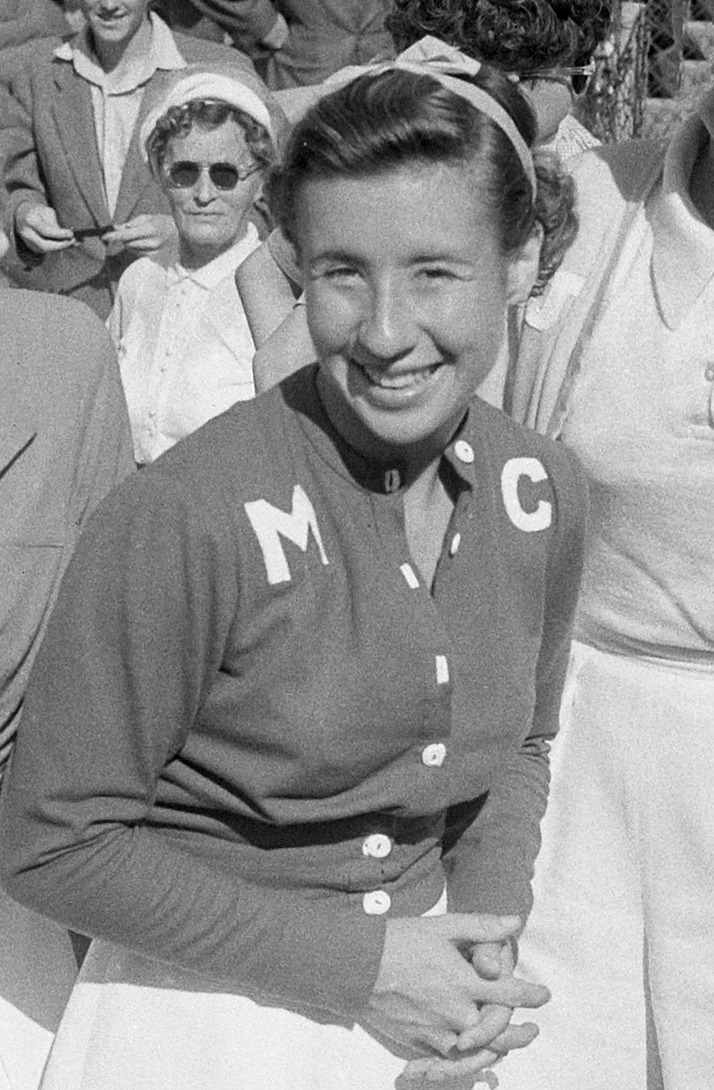
- Connolly in 1953
- Full name: Maureen Catherine Connolly
- Country (sports): United States
- Born: September 17, 1934 San Diego, California, US
- Died: June 21, 1969 (aged 34) Dallas, Texas, US
- Height: 5 ft 5 in (1.65 m)
- Turned pro: Amateur
- Retired: February 1955 (age 20)
- Plays: Right-handed (one-handed backhand)
- College: Southern Methodist University (1964–196x)
- Int. Tennis HoF: 1968 (member page)
- Official website: mcbtennis.org

Singles
- Highest ranking: No. 1 (1952)

Grand Slam singles results
- Australian Open: W (1953)
- French Open: W (1953, 1954)
- Wimbledon: W (1952, 1953, 1954)
- US Open: W (1951, 1952, 1953)

Doubles

Grand Slam doubles results
- Australian Open: W (1953)
- French Open: W (1954)
- Wimbledon: F (1952, 1953)
- US Open: F (1952)

Grand Slam mixed doubles results
- Australian Open: F (1953)
- French Open: W (1954)
- Wimbledon: SF (1954)

Team competitions
- Wightman Cup: (1951, 1952, 1953, 1954)

Maureen Catherine Connolly-Brinker (née Connolly; September 17, 1934 – June 21, 1969), known as "Little Mo", was an American tennis player, the winner of nine major singles titles in the early 1950s. In 1953, she became the first woman to win a Grand Slam (all four major tournaments during the same calendar year). She is also the only player in history to win a title without losing a set at all four major championships. The following year, in July 1954, a horseback riding accident seriously injured her right leg and ended her competitive tennis career at age 19. She died of ovarian cancer at the age of 34.

== Early years ==
Connolly was born in San Diego, California on September 17, 1934, the first child of Martin and Jessamine Connolly. Her parents divorced when she was age 3, and she was raised by her mother and an aunt. She loved horseback riding as a child, but her mother was unable to pay the cost of riding lessons. So, she took up the game of tennis. Connolly's tennis career began at the age of 10 on the municipal courts of San Diego. Her first coach, Wilbur Folsom, encouraged her to switch from a left-handed grip to a right-handed one, and she soon became a baseline specialist with tremendous power and accuracy. When she was age 11, Connolly was dubbed "Little Mo" by San Diego sportswriter Nelson Fisher, who compared the power of her forehand and backhand to the firepower of the USS Missouri, known colloquially as "Big Mo". In 1948, Folsom was replaced as her coach by Eleanor Tennant, who previously coached Alice Marble and Bobby Riggs. At age 14, she won 56 consecutive matches, and the following year, she became the youngest girl to win the U.S. national championship for girls 18 and under.

== Playing career ==
At the 1951 U.S. Championships, Connolly at age 16 defeated Shirley Fry to become, at that time, the youngest ever to win America's most prestigious tennis tournament. Her coach at the time was Eleanor Tennant.

Connolly won her first Wimbledon title in 1952, defeating Louise Brough in the final. She had arrived at the tournament with a shoulder injury but refused to withdraw when Tennant instructed her to do so. The ensuing argument resulted in the end of their partnership. Connolly was seeded first at the 1952 U.S. Championships, and she successfully defended her title with a victory in the final against Doris Hart. For the 1953 season, she hired a new coach, the Australian Davis Cup captain Harry Hopman, and she entered all four Grand Slam tournaments for the first time. She defeated Julie Sampson in the Australian Championships final and Doris Hart in the finals of the French Championships, Wimbledon, and the U.S. Championships to become the first woman, and only the second tennis player after Don Budge, to win the world's four major titles in the same year, commonly known as a Grand Slam. She lost only one set in those four tournaments.

Connolly won the last nine Grand Slam singles tournaments she played, including 50 consecutive singles matches. During her Wightman Cup career from 1951 through 1954, she won all seven of her singles matches. Connolly's achievements made her the darling of the media and one of the more popular personalities in the U.S.; she was named Female Athlete of the Year by the Associated Press for three straight years, from 1951 through 1953. In 1954, Connolly did not defend her title at the Australian Championships, but successfully defended her French and Wimbledon championships.

== Later life ==
=== Horseriding accident ===
Two weeks after she won her third-straight Wimbledon title, she was horseback riding in San Diego on July 20, 1954. A passing concrete mixer truck frightened her horse Colonel Merryboy, which pinned Connolly between the horse and truck. She was thrown and suffered a compound fracture to her right fibula, which ultimately ended her tennis career at age 19. She had intended to turn professional after the 1954 U.S. National Championships. She officially retired from tennis in February 1955 when she announced her impending marriage to Norman Brinker. Connolly retained Melvin Belli as counsel and sued the concrete mixer company. On December 17, 1957, the Supreme Court of California unanimously affirmed a $95,000 jury verdict in her favor; the opinion was signed by Chief Justice Phil S. Gibson.

=== Marriage ===
In June 1955, Connolly married Norman Brinker, a member of the 1952 Olympic equestrian team for the United States, who shared her love of horses. They had two daughters, Cindy and Brenda, and she remained partially involved in tennis, acting as a correspondent for some U.S. and British newspapers at major U.S. tennis tournaments. Connolly was a coach for the British Wightman Cup team during its visits to the U.S. In Texas, where the couple lived, she established the Maureen Connolly Brinker Foundation to promote junior tennis.

In 1957, she published an autobiography titled Forehand Drive. Connolly recognized the downside of her tennis career, writing "I have always believed greatness on a tennis court was my destiny, a dark destiny, at times, where the court became my secret jungle and I a lonely, fear-stricken hunter. I was a strange little girl armed with hate, fear, and a Golden Racket."

== Death ==
In 1966, Connolly was diagnosed with ovarian cancer. On June 4, 1969, she underwent a third operation for a stomach tumor at Baylor Hospital in Dallas. She died nearly three weeks later on June 21, at the age of 34.

== Legacy ==
According to John Olliff and Lance Tingay of The Daily Telegraph and the Daily Mail, Connolly was ranked in the world top 10 from 1951 through 1954, reaching a career high of world number one in those rankings from 1952 through 1954. Connolly was included in the year-end top-10 rankings issued by the United States Lawn Tennis Association from 1950 through 1953. She was the top-ranked U.S. player from 1951 through 1953.

Connolly was inducted into the International Tennis Hall of Fame in 1969 and the International Women's Sports Hall of Fame in 1987. In 1956, she was inducted by the San Diego Hall of Champions into the Breitbard Hall of Fame honoring San Diego's finest athletes both on and off the playing surface.

Since 1973, the Maureen Connolly Challenge Trophy is played, a yearly competition between the best female tennis players age 18 and younger from the United States and Great Britain.

Brinker Elementary School in Plano, Texas is named in honor of her. The school was dedicated on November 20, 1988.

Connolly was portrayed by Glynnis O'Connor in Little Mo, a television movie that aired on September 5, 1978.

In 2019, the United States Postal Service released a commemorative Forever stamp in her honor.

== Grand Slam finals ==
=== Singles: 9 (9 titles) ===
Result	Year	Championship	Surface	Opponent	Score	Ref
Win	1951	U.S. Championships	Grass	(United States) Shirley Fry	6–3, 1–6, 6–4	
Win	1952	Wimbledon	Grass	(United States) Louise Brough	6–4, 6–3	
Win	1952	U.S. Championships (2)	Grass	(United States) Doris Hart	6–3, 7–5	
Win	1953	Australian Championships	Grass	(United States) Julia Sampson	6–3, 6–2	
Win	1953	French Championships	Clay	(United States) Doris Hart	6–2, 6–4	
Win	1953	Wimbledon (2)	Grass	(United States) Doris Hart	8–6, 7–5	
Win	1953	U.S. Championships (3)	Grass	(United States) Doris Hart	6–2, 6–4	
Win	1954	French Championships (2)	Clay	(France) Ginette Bucaille	6–4, 6–1	
Win	1954	Wimbledon (3)	Grass	(United States) Louise Brough	6–2, 7–5	

=== Doubles: 6 (2 titles, 4 runner-ups) ===
Result	Year	Championship	Surface	Partner	Opponents	Score	Ref
Loss	1952	Wimbledon	Grass	(United States) Louise Brough	(United States) Doris Hart (United States) Shirley Fry	6–8, 3–6	
Loss	1952	U.S. Championships	Grass	(United States) Louise Brough	(United States) Doris Hart (United States) Shirley Fry	8–10, 4–6	
Win	1953	Australian Championships	Grass	(United States) Julia Sampson	(Australia) Beryl Penrose (Australia) Mary Bevis Hawton	6–4, 6–2	
Loss	1953	French Championships	Clay	(United States) Julia Sampson	(United States) Doris Hart (United States) Shirley Fry	4–6, 3–6	
Loss	1953	Wimbledon	Grass	(United States) Julia Sampson	(United States) Doris Hart (United States) Shirley Fry	0–6, 0–6	
Win	1954	French Championships	Clay	(Australia) Nell Hall Hopman	(France) Maud Galtier (France) Suzanne Schmitt	7–5, 4–6, 6–0	

=== Mixed doubles: 3 (1 title, 2 runner-ups) ===
Result	Year	Championship	Surface	Partner	Opponents	Score	Ref
Loss	1953	Australian Championships	Grass	(United States) Hamilton Richardson	(United States) Julia Sampson (Australia) Rex Hartwig	4–6, 3–6	
Loss	1953	French Championships	Clay	(Australia) Mervyn Rose	(United States) Doris Hart (United States) Vic Seixas	6–4, 4–6, 0–6	
Win	1954	French Championships	Clay	(Australia) Lew Hoad	(France) Jacqueline Patorni (Australia) Rex Hartwig	6–4, 6–3	

== Grand Slam singles performance timeline ==
Key
W	F	SF	QF	#R	RR	Q#	DNQ	A	NH

(W) winner; (F) finalist; (SF) semifinalist; (QF) quarterfinalist; (#R) rounds 4, 3, 2, 1; (RR) round-robin stage; (Q#) qualification round; (DNQ) did not qualify; (A) absent; (NH) not held; (SR) strike rate (events won / competed); (W–L) win–loss record.

Tournament	1949	1950	1951	1952	1953	1954	SR	W-L	Win %
Australian Championships	A	A	A	A	W	A	1 / 1	5–0	100%
French Championships	A	A	A	A	W	W	2 / 2	10–0	100%
Wimbledon	A	A	A	W	W	W	3 / 3	18–0	100%
U.S. Championships	2R	2R	W	W	W	A	3 / 5	20–2	91%
Win–loss	1–1	1–1	6–0	12–0	22–0	11–0	9 / 11	53–2	96%
