= Helen Fletcher =

British tennis player

- Full name: Helen Margaret Fletcher
- Country (sports): Great Britain
- Born: 24 August 1931; Heanor, Derbyshire, England
- Died: 5 April 2022 (aged 90)
- Plays: Left-handed

Singles
- Highest ranking: No. 8 (1954, Lance Tingay)

Grand Slam singles results
- French Open: 3R (1953)
- Wimbledon: QF (1954)
- US Open: 3R (1952, 1953)

Doubles

Grand Slam doubles results
- French Open: SF (1953)
- Wimbledon: SF (1953)

Helen Margaret Fletcher (24 August 1931 – 5 April 2022) was a British tennis player.

Fletcher grew up in the Derbyshire town of Heanor, attending the local grammar school. She is the youngest of three sisters. Her father, a factory owner, was president of Heanor Town Football Club.

A left-handed player, Fletcher active on tour during the 1950s. She won the singles title at the Surrey Championships in Surbiton in 1951, which put her in the frame for Wightman Cup selection.

From 1952 to 1954 she represented Great Britain in the annual Wightman Cup against the United States.

Fletcher, a Wimbledon doubles semi-finalist, had her best singles performance at the 1954 Wimbledon Championships, where she made it to the quarter-finals. Her run was ended by the second seeded Doris Hart.

In November, 1954 she married engineer Michael Barker.
