= Rex Hartwig =

Australian tennis player (1929–2022)

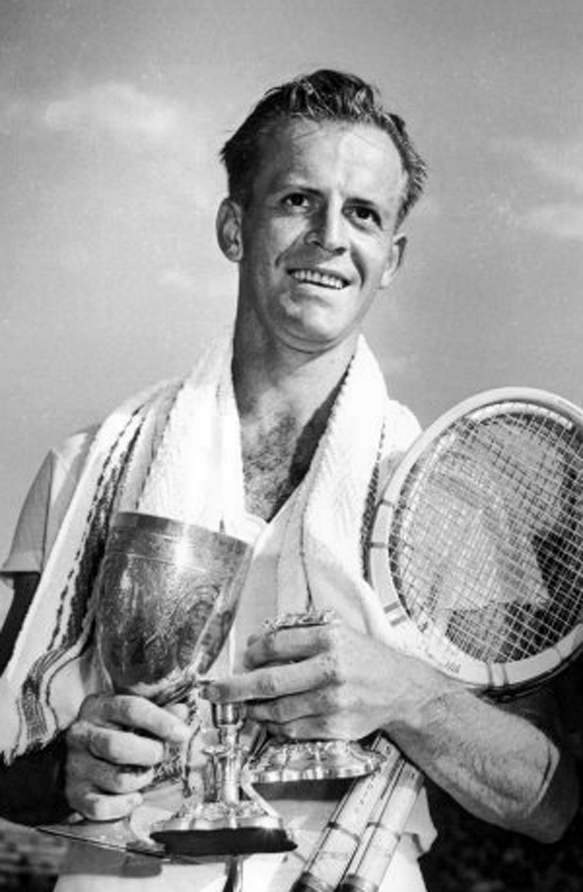
- Full name: Rex Noel Hartwig
- Country (sports): Australia
- Born: 2 September 1929 Culcairn, New South Wales, Australia
- Died: 30 December 2022 (aged 93)
- Turned pro: 1950 (amateur tour)
- Retired: 1962
- Plays: Right-handed (1-handed backhand)

Singles
- Career record: 172–70
- Career titles: 14
- Highest ranking: No. 5 (1954, Lance Tingay)

Grand Slam singles results
- Australian Open: F (1954)
- French Open: 4R (1953, 1954)
- Wimbledon: QF (1954)
- US Open: F (1954)

Other tournaments
- Other pro events
- TOC: RR (1958^{FH})

Grand Slam doubles results
- Australian Open: W (1954)
- Wimbledon: W (1954, 1955)
- US Open: W (1953)

Grand Slam mixed doubles results
- Australian Open: W (1953, 1954)
- French Open: F (1954)
- Wimbledon: QF (1954)

Team competitions
- Davis Cup: W (1953, 1955 )

Rex Noel Hartwig (2 September 1929 – 30 December 2022) was an Australian tennis player.

== Early life ==
Rex Hartwig was born on 2 September 1929 in Culcairn, New South Wales. Both parents played tennis and at age 10 he won a local tournament with his father. At 13, Hartwig began competing in afternoon competitions and took a job managing tennis courts in Albury. He formed a doubles team with Allan Kendall Jr. and won the NSW, Victorian and Australian Junior titles.

== Tennis career ==
Hartwig was ranked World No. 5 in both 1954 and 1955 by Lance Tingay of The Daily Telegraph.

Wimbledon

He won the doubles in Wimbledon twice: in 1954 with Mervyn Rose and in 1955, with Lew Hoad.

Australian Championships

In 1954, Hartwig was runner-up at the Australian championships to his Davis Cup teammate Mervyn Rose.

In 1953, he won the doubles with Rose and the mixed doubles with Julia Sampson Hayward. In 1954 he again won the mixed doubles title in Melbourne, this time partnering Thelma Coyne Long.

U.S. Championships

In 1953, he won the doubles title at the U.S. Championships with Mervyn Rose, defeating Gardnar Mulloy and Bill Talbert in the final that lasted 77 minutes.

Playing singles, he made the final in 1954, defeating Tony Trabert and Ken Rosewall but losing in the final to Vic Seixas.

Davis Cup

Hartwig was member of the Australian Davis Cup team in 1953, 1954 and 1955. In 1953, he played the doubles match with Lew Hoad in the challenge round against the US and lost to Vic Seixas and Tony Trabert. This was Hartwig's only Davis Cup defeat. In 1954, he defeated Seixas in the challenge round that Australia lost to the U.S. In 1955, he made a significant contribution toward Australia's Cup win, playing 11 matches in six ties and winning all of them. He compiled a 12–1 win–loss record in the Davis Cup (6–0 singles, 6–1 doubles).

Other tournaments

In March 1952, Hartwig won the South Australian Championships at Milton Courts, Adelaide defeating Ken McGregor in the semifinal and Rose in the final in a close five-set match.

In November 1954, Hartwig won the singles title at the New South Wales Championships in Sydney. He defeated Rosewall in the semifinal and Rose in the final in three straight sets.

Professional

In November 1955, Hartwig turned professional by signing a contract with tennis promoter Jack Kramer for a fixed amount of $30,000 plus a percentage of the gate receipts of the professional tour.

== Playing style ==
Hartwig was known for his well-timed groundstrokes and his crisp and accurate volleys. Australian tennis player and coach Harry Hopman characterized Hartwig as a great stylist.

== Grand Slam finals ==
=== Singles (2 runners-up) ===
Result	Year	Championship	Surface	Opponent	Score
Loss	1954	Australian Championships	Grass	(Australia) Mervyn Rose	2–6, 6–0, 4–6, 2–6
Loss	1954	U.S. Championships	Grass	(United States) Vic Seixas	6–3, 2–6, 4–6, 4–6

=== Doubles (4 titles – 1 runner-up) ===
Result	Year	Championship	Surface	Partner	Opponents	Score
Loss	1953	Wimbledon Championships	Grass	(Australia) Mervyn Rose	(Australia) Lew Hoad (Australia) Ken Rosewall	4–6, 5–7, 6–4, 5–7
Win	1953	U.S. Championships	Grass	(Australia) Mervyn Rose	(United States) Gardnar Mulloy (United States) Bill Talbert	6–4, 4–6, 6–2, 6–4
Win	1954	Australian Championships	Grass	(Australia) Mervyn Rose	(Australia) Neale Fraser (Australia) Clive Wilderspin	6–3, 6–4, 6–2
Win	1954	Wimbledon Championships	Grass	(Australia) Mervyn Rose	(United States) Vic Seixas (United States) Tony Trabert	6–4, 6–4, 3–6, 6–4
Win	1955	Wimbledon Championships	Grass	(Australia) Lew Hoad	(Australia) Neale Fraser (Australia) Ken Rosewall	7–5, 6–4, 6–3

=== Mixed doubles (2 titles, 2 runners-up) ===
Result	Year	Championship	Surface	Partner	Opponents	Score
Win	1953	Australian Championships	Grass	(United States) Julia Sampson	(United States) Maureen Connolly (United States) Ham Richardson	6–4, 6–3
Loss	1953	U.S. Championships	Grass	(United States) Julia Sampson	(United States) Doris Hart (United States) Vic Seixas	2–6, 6–4, 4–6
Win	1954	Australian Championships	Grass	(Australia) Thelma Coyne Long	(Australia) Beryl Penrose (Australia) John Bromwich	4–6, 6–1, 6–2
Loss	1954	French Championships	Clay	(France) Jacqueline Patorni	(United States) Maureen Connolly (Australia) Lew Hoad	4–6, 3–6
