= 1914 Wimbledon Championships – Men's doubles =

Men's doubles
- 1914 Wimbledon Championships

Final
- Champions: (Australia) Norman Brookes (New Zealand) Anthony Wilding
- Runners-up: (United Kingdom) Herbert Roper Barrett (United Kingdom) Charles Dixon
- Score: 6–1, 6–1, 5–7, 8–6

Details
- Draw: 44
- Seeds: –

Events
Singles	men	women		boys	girls
Doubles	men	women	mixed	boys	girls
← 1913 ·	Wimbledon Championships	· 1919 →

Norman Brookes and Anthony Wilding defeated Arthur Lowe and Gordon Lowe 6–2, 8–6, 6–1 in the All Comers' Final, and then defeated the reigning champions Herbert Roper Barrett and Charles Dixon 6–1, 6–1, 5–7, 8–6 in the challenge round to win the gentlemen's doubles tennis title at the 1914 Wimbledon Championships.

== Draw ==
=== Key ===
- Q = Qualifier
- WC = Wild card
- LL = Lucky loser
- Alt = Alternate
- SE = Special exempt
- PR = Protected ranking
- ITF = ITF entry
- JE = Junior exempt
- w/o = Walkover
- r = Retired
- d = Defaulted
- SR = Special ranking

=== Challenge round ===
Challenge Round
(Australia) Norman Brookes (New Zealand) Anthony Wilding	6	6	5	8
(United Kingdom) Herbert Roper Barrett (United Kingdom) Charles Dixon	1	1	7	6

=== All comers' finals ===
Quarterfinals
(France) Max Decugis (France) Maurice Germot	4	6	4
(Australia) Stanley Doust (United Kingdom) Theodore Mavrogordato	6	8	6
(United Kingdom) William Clements (United Kingdom) Douglas Watson	2	1	4
(Australia) Norman Brookes (New Zealand) Anthony Wilding	6	6	6
(United Kingdom) Arthur Lowe (United Kingdom) Gordon Lowe	6	6	7
(Australia) Alfred Dunlop (United Kingdom) RWF Harding	4	2	5
(Germany) Luis Maria Heyden (Germany) Robert Spiess	8	4	4	7	4
(United Kingdom) Hope Crisp (United Kingdom) Cyril Eltringham	6	6	6	5	6

Semifinals
(Australia) Stanley Doust (United Kingdom) Theodore Mavrogordato	1	2	6	3
(Australia) Norman Brookes (New Zealand) Anthony Wilding	6	6	3	6
(United Kingdom) Arthur Lowe (United Kingdom) Gordon Lowe	2	6	8	4	6
(United Kingdom) Hope Crisp (United Kingdom) Cyril Eltringham	6	2	6	6	3

Final
(Australia) Norman Brookes (New Zealand) Anthony Wilding	6	8	6
(United Kingdom) Arthur Lowe (United Kingdom) Gordon Lowe	2	6	1

=== Top half ===
==== Section 1 ====
First round

Second round
(France) Max Decugis (France) Maurice Germot	8	6	7
(United Kingdom) Roderick McNair (United Kingdom) TD Stoward	6	1	5
(United Kingdom) HS Bullock (United Kingdom) SF Thol	6	6	7
(United Kingdom) AM Cooper (United Kingdom) ER Geddes	4	1	5
(Australia) Stanley Doust (United Kingdom) Theodore Mavrogordato	6	3	9	1	7
(United Kingdom) Alfred Beamish (United Kingdom) James Cecil Parke	2	6	7	6	5
(United Kingdom) Walter Crawley (United Kingdom) Percival Davson	6	6	6
(United Kingdom) Peter Hicks (United Kingdom) Alfred Ingram	1	2	1

Third round
(France) M Decugis (France) M Germot	6	6	6
(United Kingdom) HS Bullock (United Kingdom) SF Thol	0	2	3
(Australia) S Doust (United Kingdom) T Mavrogordato	3	6	5	6	9
(United Kingdom) W Crawley (United Kingdom) P Davson	6	3	7	3	7

Quarterfinals
(France) M Decugis (France) M Germot	4	6	4
(Australia) S Doust (United Kingdom) T Mavrogordato	6	8	6

==== Section 2 ====
First round
(United Kingdom) FCG Fison; WJ Pearse	7	6	6
(United Kingdom) Hamilton Price (United Kingdom) Sydney Watts	5	2	4
(United Kingdom) William Clements (United Kingdom) Douglas Watson	6	6	7
(United Kingdom) HE Evers (United Kingdom) EJ Harrison	1	2	5
(United Kingdom) Albert Prebble (United Kingdom) Major Ritchie	6	6	4	6
(United Kingdom) AJ Jimenez (United Kingdom) R du Roveray	0	4	6	0
(United Kingdom) Arthur Yencken (United Kingdom) Edward Yencken	6	6	6
(United Kingdom) Charles Gouldesborough (United Kingdom) Charles Simond	4	3	3
(United States) Craig Biddle (United Kingdom) A. Wallis Myers
(Germany) Otto Froitzheim (Germany) Heinrich Kleinschroth	w/o
(Australia) Norman Brookes (New Zealand) Anthony Wilding	6	6	6
(United Kingdom) RF Baird (United Kingdom) JG Bill	1	1	0

Second round
(United Kingdom) Arthur Gore (United Kingdom) Algernon Kingscote	6	6	6
(United Kingdom) EF Kuhn; ST Oppenheimer	0	1	0
(United Kingdom) FCG Fison; WJ Pearse	2	4	3
(United Kingdom) W Clements (United Kingdom) D Watson	6	6	6
(United Kingdom) A Prebble (United Kingdom) M Ritchie	6	6	8
(United Kingdom) A Yencken (United Kingdom) ED Yencken	3	1	8
(United States) C Biddle (United Kingdom) AW Myers	w/o
(Australia) N Brookes (New Zealand) A Wilding

Third round
(United Kingdom) A Gore (United Kingdom) A Kingscote	8	10	0	2	2
(United Kingdom) W Clements (United Kingdom) D Watson	6	8	6	6	6
(United Kingdom) A Prebble (United Kingdom) M Ritchie	1	6	0	4
(Australia) N Brookes (New Zealand) A Wilding	6	4	6	6

Quarterfinals
(United Kingdom) W Clements (United Kingdom) D Watson	2	1	4
(Australia) N Brookes (New Zealand) A Wilding	6	6	6

The nationalities of ST Oppenheimer and WJ Pearse are unknown.

=== Bottom half ===
==== Section 3 ====
First round
(United Kingdom) Harold Aitken (United Kingdom) Cedric Scott
(United Kingdom) R Reader-Harris (United Kingdom) Aa'B Terrell	w/o
(United Kingdom) AJ Ross (United Kingdom) GTC Watt	6	6	10
(United Kingdom) Stanley Franklin (United Kingdom) MRL White	0	2	8
(United Kingdom) Humphrey Milford (United Kingdom) Ernest Pooley	9	6	5	6
(United Kingdom) AW Davson (United Kingdom) John Flavelle	7	3	7	0
(United Kingdom) Arthur Lowe (United Kingdom) Gordon Lowe	6	1	6	6
(United Kingdom) Noel Turnbull (United Kingdom) Richard Turnbull	2	6	2	1
(United Kingdom) LS Lee (South Africa) Newton Thompson	6	6	6
(United Kingdom) EA Stoner (United Kingdom) GR Westmacott	0	2	0
(United Kingdom) George Thomas (United Kingdom) Cecil Tindell-Green	6	6	6
(United Kingdom) Evan Gwynne-Evans (United Kingdom) George Stoddart	3	2	2

Second round
(United Kingdom) H Aitken (United Kingdom) C Scott	4	0	3
(United Kingdom) AJ Ross (United Kingdom) GTC Watt	6	6	6
(United Kingdom) HS Milford (United Kingdom) E Pooley	6	2	3	4
(United Kingdom) A Lowe (United Kingdom) G Lowe	4	6	6	6
(United Kingdom) LS Lee (South Africa) N Thompson	2	6	3	2
(United Kingdom) G Thomas (United Kingdom) C Tindell-Green	6	3	6	6
(Australia) Alfred Dunlop (United Kingdom) RWF Harding	9	4	6	6
(United Kingdom) LF Davin (United Kingdom) CS Gordon-Smith	7	6	2	1

Third round
(United Kingdom) AJ Ross (United Kingdom) GTC Watt	1	1	3
(United Kingdom) A Lowe (United Kingdom) G Lowe	6	6	6
(United Kingdom) G Thomas (United Kingdom) C Tindell-Green	4	0	3
(Australia) A Dunlop (United Kingdom) RWF Harding	6	6	6

Quarterfinals
(United Kingdom) A Lowe (United Kingdom) G Lowe	6	6	7
(Australia) A Dunlop (United Kingdom) RWF Harding	4	2	5

==== Section 4 ====
First round

Second round
(Germany) Luis Maria Heyden (Germany) Robert Spiess
(United Kingdom) LD Edwards (United Kingdom) FW Last	w/o
(United Kingdom) Sydney Jacob (United Kingdom) Maj. Roe	6	6	6
(United Kingdom) WD Barber (United Kingdom) RH Hotham	3	2	4
(United Kingdom) Mark Hick (United Kingdom) Neville Willford	3	6	6	6
(United Kingdom) Fritz Goldberg (United Kingdom) JB Ward	6	0	1	1
(United Kingdom) Hope Crisp (United Kingdom) Cyril Eltringham	6	6	6
(United Kingdom) AJ Roberts (United Kingdom) A Rowley	0	3	1

Third round
(Germany) LM Heyden (Germany) R Spiess	6	6	6
(United Kingdom) S Jacob (United Kingdom) Maj. Roe	3	4	1
(United Kingdom) M Hick (United Kingdom) N Willford	2	4	3
(United Kingdom) H Crisp (United Kingdom) C Eltringham	6	6	6

Quarterfinals
(Germany) LM Heyden (Germany) R Spiess	8	4	4	7	4
(United Kingdom) H Crisp (United Kingdom) C Eltringham	6	6	6	5	6
