= Ann Jones (tennis) =

English tennis player (born 1938)

Ann Jones CBE
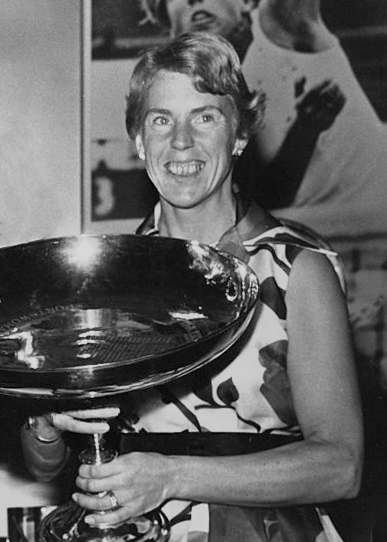
- Jones as the Daily Express Sports Woman of the Year 1969
- Full name: Ann Shirley Jones
- Country (sports): (United Kingdom) Great Britain
- Born: Adrianne Haydon; 17 October 1938 (age 87) Kings Heath, Birmingham, England
- Plays: Left-handed
- Int. Tennis HoF: 1985 (member page)

Singles
- Career record: 1077-244 (81.5%)
- Career titles: 136
- Highest ranking: No. 2 (1967, Lance Tingay)

Grand Slam singles results
- Australian Open: SF (1969)
- French Open: W (1961, 1966)
- Wimbledon: W (1969)
- US Open: F (1961, 1967)

Grand Slam doubles results
- Australian Open: SF (1969)
- French Open: W (1963, 1968, 1969)
- Wimbledon: F (1968)
- US Open: F (1960)

Grand Slam mixed doubles results
- Australian Open: W (1969)
- French Open: F (1960, 1966, 1967)
- Wimbledon: W (1969)

Ann Shirley Jones (born Adrianne Haydon; 17 October 1938), also known as Ann Haydon-Jones, is an English former tennis and table tennis champion. She won eight Grand Slam tennis championships in her career: three in singles, three in women's doubles and two in mixed doubles. In 2023, she served as a vice president of the All England Lawn Tennis and Croquet Club.

== Career ==
=== Table tennis ===
Jones was born in Kings Heath, Birmingham, England. Her parents were prominent table tennis players, her father, Adrian Haydon, having been English number 1 and a competitor at world championships between 1928 and 1953. Ann was ambidextrous when she was small, but her parents told her to choose one hand or the other which led her to choose to be left-handed. Ann, as a young girl, also took up the game, participating in five world championships in the 1950s, the best result being losing finalist in singles, doubles and mixed doubles all in Stockholm 1957. Soon after this she wrote the book Tackle Table Tennis This Way.

Jones also won two English Open titles in women's doubles as Haydon.

=== Tennis ===
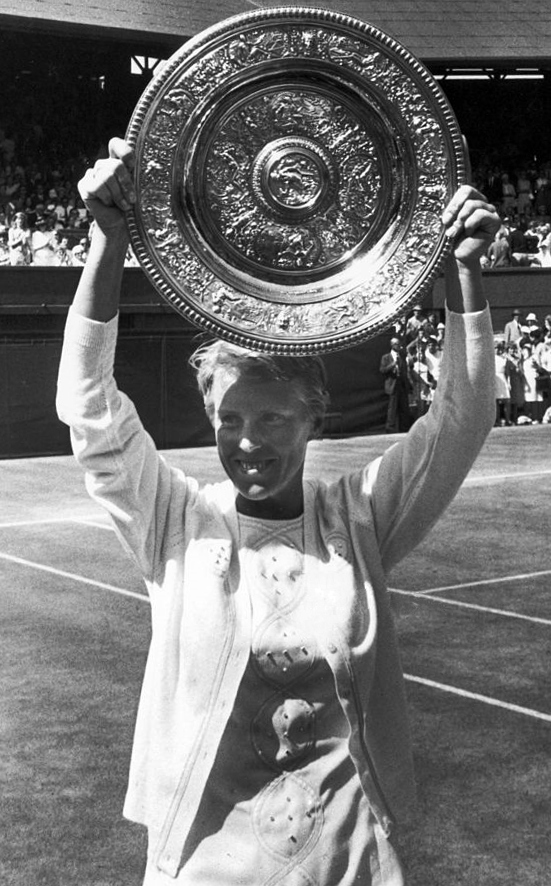
Jones after winning the 1969 Wimbledon title

Jones was also a powerful lawn tennis player, winning the 1954 and 1955 British junior championships. In 1956, she won the Wimbledon girls' singles championship.

Jones played lawn tennis in a highly competitive era that included some of the greatest female tennis players of all time, such as Billie Jean King, Margaret Court, and Maria Bueno. Despite the fierce competition, she won the 1961 French Championships, beating Margaret Smith, former champion Zsuzsa Körmöczy and Yola Ramírez and reached the final of the 1961 U.S. Championships, beating Wimbledon champion Angela Mortimer, losing to the defending champion Darlene Hard. In 1962, she married Philip F. Jones and played as Ann Haydon-Jones. A debilitating back and neck injury hampered her career in 1964/1965, yet she recovered sufficiently to reach the quarterfinals of the French championships in 1965, yet was controversially unseeded for that year's Wimbledon singles. This led to a fourth-round clash with the top-seeded defending champion Maria Bueno, which many thought was an imbalanced draw. Jones won the French title for a second time in 1966, beating Maria Bueno and Nancy Richey. She also won the Italian championships that year, beating Françoise Dürr and Annette Van Zyl.

At both the Wimbledon Championships and the U.S. Championships in 1967, Jones lost in the final to King. Two years later, however, the two again met in the Wimbledon final. This time, Jones took the most coveted title in the sport, making her the first left-handed female player to do so. She rounded off that year's Wimbledon by winning the mixed doubles championship with Australia's Fred Stolle. Her performances resulted in her being voted the BBC Sports Personality of the Year. Jones made Wimbledon 1969 her last Grand Slam singles event. She was seeded number one for the 1969 US Open but withdrew before the tournament began. She radically reduced her playing schedule for 1970, playing in South Africa where she won the Orange Free State Championships and the Western Province Championships. She then largely played only events in the United Kingdom for the remainder of the year. She returned to the international scene to play the Federation Cup event in Australia, where she partnered Virginia Wade on the British team. In 1971, Jones played on the Virginia Slims circuit, winning the U.S.$10,000 first prize for the event staged in Las Vegas, beating King in the final. Jones more or less retired after this event as she was expecting her first child. However, she continued to play the occasional UK event and was part of the 1975 Wightman Cup team for Great Britain. In 1977, Jones teamed with Winnie Wooldridge to play doubles at Wimbledon.

According to Lance Tingay and Bud Collins, Jones was ranked in the world top 10 from 1957 through 1963 and from 1965 through 1970, reaching a career high of world No. 2 in these rankings in 1967 and 1969.

According to Mark Lewisohn in The Complete Beatles Recording Sessions, on 4 July 1969, The Beatles paused the dubbing session for their song "Golden Slumbers" to listen to Jones beat King for the Wimbledon title when live on radio.

With the dawn of the open era in 1968, Jones joined King and others to organise the first professional female touring group. In 1970, she was hired by the BBC as a guest commentator and worked with it for over three decades, occasionally commentating for tennis coverage on U.S. TV stations. Jones was chairwoman of the Women's International Tennis Council and for many years the British team captain for events such as the Federation and Wightman Cups.

Over her career, she reached six Wimbledon semifinals in addition to her two appearances in the final: in 1958, beating Maria Bueno and losing to defending champion Althea Gibson; 1960, beating Renée Schuurman Haygarth and losing to Sandra Reynolds; 1962, beating Billie Jean Moffitt and losing to eventual champion Karen Hantze Susman; 1963, losing to runner-up Billie Jean Moffitt; 1966, beating Nancy Richey and losing a three-set match to Maria Bueno; and 1968 losing, after leading by a set and a break, to holder Billie Jean King. In the U.S. Nationals, as well as her final appearances in 1961 and 1967, Ann Jones reached three semifinals: in 1959, beating second-seed Sandra Reynolds (Price) and losing to Christine Truman; in 1963, beating second-seed Darlene Hard and losing 9–7 in the third set to eventual winner Maria Bueno; and in 1968, losing to eventual winner Virginia Wade.

As well as winning the French Championships twice, Jones reached three other French finals, beating Annette Van Zyl and losing to Nancy Richey in 1968, and beating Rosemary Casals and Lesley Turner and losing in three sets to Margaret Court in 1969. Of her three losing finals in the French championships, there was one which nearly added to her total of wins: 1963 when she led Lesley Turner 5–2 in the final set. She also reached the semifinals in 1957 aged 18, beating third seed Christiane Mercelis and losing a tough semifinal to Dorothy Head Knode, and in 1962 beating Jan Lehane and losing to Lesley Turner.

In the British Hard Courts championships, after losing in the finals in 1958 to Shirley Bloomer Brasher and 1960 to Christine Truman, she was undefeated from 1963 to 1966, winning finals against Norma Baylon, Jan Lehane, Annette Van Zyl and Virginia Wade. She was a stalwart in the Wightman Cup from 1957 (aged 18, beating Darlene Hard, then Wimbledon finalist) to 1967, 1970 and 1975, winning the deciding match in 1958 against Mimi Arnold when Britain won for the first time since 1930, taking both her singles against Billie Jean Moffitt and Nancy Richey in 1965 and overall winning nine singles and six doubles. Despite playing at a time when there were four other British winners of the French, Australian, US and Wimbledon titles, (Mortimer, Brasher, Truman and Wade), she was ranked no. 1 in the UK on seven occasions. Naturally a baseliner and effective as such on clay (Tiiu Kivi said it was like playing a brick wall that moved), she schooled herself to become a most effective net player, perhaps seen at her best when attacking Margaret Court to defeat in the Wimbledon semifinal of 1969. Apart from Althea Gibson, early in her career, there was not a leading player of her era that she did not beat on several occasions.

== Personal life ==
In 1971 she published her tennis autobiography A Game to Love.

Jones attracted media attention on 30 August 1962 when she married businessman Philip "Pip" Jones (1907–1993) who was 31 years her senior. Pip Jones became the first Tour Director of the Virginia Slims Women's Tennis Tour in 1971.

In 1969, West Bromwich Albion commended Ann Jones on her sporting success and stated that she and her husband were supporters of the club.

Jones is portrayed by Australian actress Cazz Bainbridge in the 2026 ABC TV Mini Series Goolagong.

== Awards ==
In 1985, Jones was voted into the International Tennis Hall of Fame. For many years, Jones was chairwoman of the International Women's Tennis Council and has long been a member of Wimbledon's Committee of Management. She became the first 'civilian woman' (i.e., not a member of the British Royal Family) to present the trophies at Wimbledon when she awarded the winners of the Mixed Doubles championship their cup in 2007, a ceremony she now regularly performs. She also has presented the junior girls trophy.

Jones was appointed Member of the Order of the British Empire (MBE) in 1969 and Commander of the Order of the British Empire (CBE) in the 2014 New Year Honours for services to tennis.

The stadium court at the Edgbaston Priory Tennis Club was renamed the Ann Jones Centre Court in 2013.

== Grand Slam finals ==
Including:

=== Singles: 9 (3–6) ===
Result	Year	Championship	Surface	Opponent	Score
Win	1961	French Championships	Clay	(Mexico) Yola Ramírez	6–2, 6–1
Loss	1961	US Championships	Grass	(United States) Darlene Hard	3–6, 4–6
Loss	1963	French Championships	Clay	(Australia) Lesley Turner	6–2, 3–6, 5–7
Win	1966	French Championships	Clay	(United States) Nancy Richey	6–3, 6–1
Loss	1967	Wimbledon	Grass	(United States) Billie Jean King	3–6, 4–6
Loss	1967	US Championships	Grass	(United States) Billie Jean King	9–11, 4–6
Loss	1968	French Championships	Clay	(United States) Nancy Richey	7–5, 4–6, 1–6
Loss	1969	French Open	Clay	(Australia) Margaret Court	1–6, 6–4, 3–6
Win	1969	Wimbledon	Grass	(United States) Billie Jean King	3–6, 6–3, 6–2

=== Doubles: 6 (3–3) ===
Result	Year	Championship	Surface	Partner	Opponents	Score
Loss	1960	French Championships	Clay	(United Kingdom) Patricia Ward Hales	(Brazil) Maria Bueno (United States) Darlene Hard	2–6, 5–7
Loss	1960	U.S. Championships	Grass	(United Kingdom) Deidre Catt	(Brazil) Maria Bueno (United States) Darlene Hard	1–6, 1–6
Win	1963	French Championships	Clay	(South Africa) Renée Schuurman	(Australia) Margaret Smith (Australia) Robyn Ebbern	7–5, 6–4
Win	1968	French Open	Clay	(France) Françoise Dürr	(United States) Rosie Casals (United States) Billie Jean King	7–5, 4–6, 6–4
Loss	1968	Wimbledon	Grass	(France) Françoise Dürr	(United States) Rosie Casals (United States) Billie Jean King	11–9, 4–6, 2–6
Win	1969	French Open	Clay	(France) Françoise Dürr	(Australia) Margaret Court (United States) Nancy Richey	6–0, 4–6, 7–5

=== Mixed doubles: 6 (2–4) ===
Result	Year	Championship	Surface	Partner	Opponents	Score
Loss	1960	French Championships	Clay	(Australia) Roy Emerson	(Brazil) Maria Bueno (Australia) Bob Howe	6–1, 1–6, 2–6
Loss	1962	Wimbledon	Grass	(United States) Dennis Ralston	(United States) Margaret Osborne duPont (Australia) Neale Fraser	6–2, 3–6, 11–13
Loss	1966	French Championships	Clay	(United States) Clark Graebner	(South Africa) Annette Van Zyl (South Africa) Frew McMillan	6–1, 3–6, 2–6
Loss	1967	French Championships	Clay	(Romania) Ion Țiriac	(United States) Billie Jean King (Australia) Owen Davidson	3–6, 1–6
Win	1969	Wimbledon	Grass	(Australia) Fred Stolle	(Australia) Judy Tegart (Australia) Tony Roche	6–2, 6–3
Win	1969	Australian Open	Grass	(Australia) Fred Stolle	(Australia) Margaret Court (United States) Marty Riessen	*Shared, final not played

- Although both teams shared the 1969 Australian Open mixed doubles title, it is not counted in the official Grand Slam title count.

== Grand Slam performance timelines ==
Key
W	F	SF	QF	#R	RR	Q#	DNQ	A	NH

(W) winner; (F) finalist; (SF) semifinalist; (QF) quarterfinalist; (#R) rounds 4, 3, 2, 1; (RR) round-robin stage; (Q#) qualification round; (DNQ) did not qualify; (A) absent; (NH) not held; (SR) strike rate (events won / competed); (W–L) win–loss record.

=== Singles ===
Tournament	1956	1957	1958	1959	1960	1961	1962	1963	1964	1965	1966	1967	1968	1969	W–L
Australia	A	A	A	A	A	A	A	A	A	2R	A	A	A	SF	3–2
France	A	SF	QF	A	3R	W	SF	F	A	QF	W	QF	F	F	44–9
Wimbledon	2R	3R	SF	QF	SF	4R	SF	SF	QF	4R	SF	F	SF	W	57–13
United States	A	QF	3R	SF	QF	F	A	SF	QF	QF	A	F	SF	A	36–10

=== Doubles ===
Tournament	1956	1957	1958	1959	1960	1961	1962	1963	1964	1965	1966	1967	1968	1969	1970–1974	1975	1976	1977	W–L
Australia	A	A	A	A	A	A	A	A	A	QF	A	A	A	SF	A	A	A	A	4–2
France	A	2R	SF	A	F	QF	SF	W	A	QF	SF	QF	W	W	A	A	A	A	32–7
Wimbledon	1R	3R	2R	QF	3R	3R	2R	SF	SF	2R	SF	SF	F	3R	A	A	A	3R	33–15
United States	A	QF	SF	SF	F	QF	A	SF	A	A	A	A	SF	A	A	1R	A	A	17–8

== Career finals ==
=== Singles titles (136) ===
Legend Grand Slam tournaments (3) ILTF (119); ILTF Grand Prix/VS Circuit (17)	Titles by surface Clay / outdoor (51) Grass / outdoor (44) Hard / outdoor (12) Hard / indoor (1) Wood / indoor (24) Carpet / indoor (4)

Result	No.	Date	Tournament	Surface	Opponent	Score
Win	1.	1955	Norfolk Championships	Grass	(United Kingdom) Honor Durose	6-0, 6-1
Win	2.	1955	Hunaston Tournament	Grass	(United Kingdom) Mary Harris	6-2, 6-1
Win	3.	1955	Worthing Clay Courts	Clay	(United Kingdom) S C Collett	6–3, 3–6, 6–4
Win	4.	1956	East Gloucestershire Championships	Grass	(United Kingdom) Viola White	6–1, 5–7, 6–1
Win	5.	1956	Sunderland and Durham Open Championships	Grass	(Australia) Kay Newcombe	6-1. 6-1
Win	6.	1956	Welsh Championships	Grass	(Australia) Daphne Seeney	6–2, 6–3
Win	7.	1956	North of England Championships	Grass	(United Kingdom) Elaine Watson	6–2, 7–5
Win	8.	1956	Worthing Open	Grass	(United Kingdom) Sheila Griffin Bramley	6–2, 7–5
Win	9.	1957	Tally-Ho! Open Tennis Championships	Clay	(United Kingdom) Rita Bentley	6–2, 6–1
Win	10.	1957	Northumberland County Championships	Grass	(United States) Karol Fageros	6–4, 5–7, 6–3
Win	11.	1957	South of England Championships	Grass	(United Kingdom) Angela Mortimer	6–3, 6–4
Win	12.	1957	Sunderland and Durham Open Championships	Grass	(United Kingdom) Rita Bentley	6–2, 6–2
Win	13.	1957	Worcestershire Championships	Grass	(West Germany) Edda Buding	6–2, 6–4
Win	14.	1958	Tally-Ho! Open Tennis Championships	Clay	(United Kingdom) Rita Bentley	6–2, 6–1
Win	16.	1958	Worcestershire Championships	Grass	(West Germany) Edda Buding	6–1, 6–4
Win	17.	1958	Sunderland and Durham Open Championships	Grass	(United Kingdom) Honor Clarke	6–0, 6–0
Win	18.	1959	Pan American Championships	Clay	(Mexico) Yola Ramírez	6–0, 6–0
Win	19.	1959	Worcestershire Championships	Grass	(United Kingdom) Sheila Armstrong	6-2, 10-8
Win	20.	1959	Northumberland County Championships	Grass	(United Kingdom) Shirley Bloomer Brasher	6-1, 6-4
Win	21.	1960	Finnish Covered Court Championships	Wood (i)	(United Kingdom) Angela Mortimer	6-3, 6-3
Win	22.	1960	Scandinavian Covered Court Championships	Wood (i)	(United Kingdom) Angela Mortimer	9–7, 3–6, 6–2
Win	23.	1960	Good Neighbor Championships	Clay	(United States) Barbara Davidson	6-0, 6-1
Win	24.	1960	Masters Invitational	Clay	(United States) Donna Floyd	6-1, 6-2
Win	24.	1960	Caribe Hilton Invitational	Hard	(Brazil) Maria Bueno	4–6, 6–4, 6–4
Win	25.	1960	St. Andrew International Invitation	Grass	(United States) Darlene Hard	6-2, 6-3
Win	26.	1960	Caribbean Championships	Grass	(United States) Darlene Hard	divided title
Win	27.	1960	Tally-Ho! Open Tennis Championships	Clay	(United Kingdom) Heather Cheadle	6–2, 6–1
Win	28.	1960	Sutton Hard Court Championships	Clay	(United Kingdom) Shirley Brasher	6-2, 6-2
Win	29.	1960	Worcestershire Championships	Grass	(United Kingdom) Jill Mills	6-1, 6-2
Win	30.	1960	Cologne Tournament	Clay	(South Africa) Sandra Reynolds	Default
Win	31.	1960	Essex County Invitation	Grass	(United States) Darlene Hard	6–3, 2–6, 6–1
Win	32.	1960	Pacific Southwest Championships	Hard	(United States) Darlene Hard	6-4, 6-3
Win	33.	1960	Moroccan International Championships	Clay	(France) Jacqueline Rees-Lewis	6-0, 6-2
Win	34.	1960	West German Covered Court Championships	Wood (i)	(United Kingdom) Sheila Armstrong	6-3, 6-0
Win	35.	1960	Palace Hotel Covered Courts Championships	Wood (i)	(United Kingdom) Angela Mortimer	6-4, 6-2
Win	36.	1961	Good Neighbor Championships	Clay	(Hungary) Suzie Körmöczy	6-0, 6-1
Win	37.	1961	French Championships	Clay	(Mexico) Yola Ramírez	6–2, 6–1
Win	38.	1961	Wolverhampton Open	Grass	(Australia) Lynne Hutchings	6-0, 6-1
Win	39.	1961	Lowther Open	Grass	(United Kingdom) Shirley Brasher	6-1, 6-2
Win	40.	1961	Irish Championships	Grass	(United States) Kathy Chabot	6-0, 6-3
Win	41.	1961	Welsh Championships	Grass	(United Kingdom) Jill Mills	4–6, 6–2, 6–2
Win	42.	1961	Canadian Championships	Grass	(Canada) Ann Barclay	6-4, 6-0
Win	43.	1961	Chilean National Championships	Clay	(Italy) Lea Pericoli	6–4, 7–5
Win	44.	1961	São Paulo International Championships	Clay	(Italy) Lea Pericoli	6-4, 6-1
Win	45.	1962	Western Province Championships	Hard	(South Africa) Sandra Reynolds Price	6-4, 6-1
Win	46.	1962	Hulett Natal Sugar Open Championships	Hard	(South Africa) Annette Van Zyl	6-2, 6-0
Win	47.	1962	Scandinavian Covered Court Championships	Wood (i)	(United Kingdom) Deidre Catt	6-2, 6-4
Win	48.	1962	French Covered Court Championships	Wood (i)	(Mexico) Rosie Darmon	6-3, 6-1
Win	49.	1962	British Covered Court Championships	Wood (i)	(United Kingdom) Christine Truman	6–4, 4–6, 9–7
Win	50.	1962	Cumberland Hard Court Championships	Clay	(United Kingdom) Lorna Cawthorn	6-2, 6-1
Win	51.	1962	Sutton Hard Court Championships	Clay	(United Kingdom) Deidre Catt	6-2, 6-1
Win	52.	1962	London Hard Court Championships	Clay	(United Kingdom) Christine Truman	6-4, 6-1
Win	53.	1962	East Gloucestershire Championships	Grass	(South Africa) Renée Schuurman	6-2, 8-6
Win	54.	1962	Midland Counties Championships	Grass	(United Kingdom) Rita Bentley	divided title
Win	55.	1962	Welsh Championships	Grass	(United Kingdom) Jill Mills	6-4, 6-3
Win	56.	1962	Palace Tournament	Clay	(United Kingdom) Angela Mortimer	6–3, 4–6, 6–2
Win	57.	1963	Coupe Pierre Gillou	Wood (i)	(France) Michelle Boulle	6-2, 6-1
Win	58.	1963	German Indoor Championships	Wood (i)	(Belgium) Christiane Mercelis	6–1, 4–6, 8–6
Win	59.	1963	Scandinavian Indoor Championships	Wood (i)	(United Kingdom) Deidre Catt	6-0, 6-1
Win	60.	1963	French Covered Court Championships	Wood (i)	(France) Janine Lieffrig	8-6, 6-1
Win	61.	1963	Carlton International	Clay	(United States) Mary Habicht	6-0, 6-1
Win	62.	1963	Surrey Hard Court Championships	Clay	(United Kingdom) Carol Rosser	divided title
Win	63.	1963	British Hard Court Championships	Clay	(Argentina) Norma Baylon	6–0, 1–6, 9–7
Win	64.	1963	London Hard Court Championships	Clay	(United Kingdom) Christine Truman	6–4, 4–6, 6–2
Win	65.	1963	Wolverhampton Open	Grass	(South Africa) Renée Schuurman	9–7, 1–6, 6–4
Win	66.	1963	East Gloucestershire Championships	Grass	(South Africa) Renée Schuurman	7-5, 9-7
Win	67.	1963	Hoylake and West Kirby Open	Grass	(Australia) Jill Blackman	6-2, 6-1
Win	68.	1963	Carlyon Bay Covered Court Championships	Wood (i)	(United Kingdom) Deidre Catt	6-4, 6-3
Win	69.	1964	British Hard Court Championships	Clay	(Australia) Jan Lehane	6-2, 12-10
Win	70.	1964	Sutton Coldfield Hard Courts Championship	Clay	(United Kingdom) Rita Bentley	1–6, 8–6, 6–4
Win	71.	1964	Surrey Grass Court Championships	Grass	(United States) Carole Caldwell	6-3, 6-1
Win	72.	1964	Bavarian International Championships	Clay	(South Africa) Annette Van Zyl	3–6, 6–2, 6–4
Win	73.	1964	British Covered Court Championships	Wood (i)	(Australia) Fay Toyne	6-3, 6-3
Win	74.	1964	Carlyon Bay Covered Court Championships	Wood (i)	(Australia) Fay Toyne	9-7, 6-4
Win	75.	1964	Palace Hotel Covered Courts Championships	Wood (i)	(United Kingdom) Deidre Catt	6-3, 7-5
Win	76.	1965	French Covered Court Championships	Wood (i)	(United Kingdom) Elizabeth Starkie	6–3, 6–8, 6–2
Win	77.	1965	Dutch Covered Court Championships	Wood (i)	(Australia) Fay Toyne	6-0, 6-2
Win	78.	1965	Cumberland Hard Court Championships	Clay	(United Kingdom) Christine Truman	4–6, 6–3, 10-8
Win	79.	1965	Surrey Hard Court Championships	Clay	(United Kingdom) Winnie Shaw	6-3, 6-0
Win	80.	1965	British Hard Court Championships	Clay	(South Africa) Annette Van Zyl	7-5, 6-1
Win	81.	1965	British Covered Court Championships	Wood (i)	(Australia) Fay Toyne	6-2, 6-1
Win	82.	1965	Carlyon Bay Covered Court Championships	Wood (i)	(United Kingdom) Virginia Wade	7-5, 6-2
Win	83.	1965	Palace Hotel Covered Courts Championships	Wood (i)	(Australia) Trish Faulkner	6-1, 6-1
Win	84.	1966	German Covered Court Championships	Wood (i)	(West Germany) Helga Niessen	7–9, 7–5, 6–3
Win	85.	1966	French Covered Court Championships	Wood (i)	(United Kingdom) Frances MacLennan	6-2, 6-1
Win	86.	1966	Cumberland Hard Court Championships	Clay	(United Kingdom) Elizabeth Starkie	6-2, 6-2
Win	87.	1966	Connaught Hard Court Championships	Clay	(United Kingdom) Virginia Wade	6-4, 6-3
Win	88.	1966	British Hard Court Championships	Clay	(United Kingdom) Virginia Wade	6-3, 6-1
Win	89.	1966	Italian International Championships	Clay	(South Africa) Annette Van Zyl	8-6, 6-1
Win	90.	1966	French Championships	Clay	(United States) Nancy Richey	6–2, 6–1
Win	91.	1966	Moscow International Outdoor Championships	Clay	(Soviet Union) Anna Dmitrieva	6-1, 6-3
Win	92.	1967	German Indoor Championships	Wood (i)	(Belgium) Ingrid Loeys	6-1, 6-1
Win	93.	1967	Scandinavian Indoor Championships	Wood (i)	(Soviet Union) Galina Baksheeva	6–2, 4–6, 6–4
Win	94.	1967	Dixie International Championships	Clay	(France) Françoise Dürr	6-4, 8-6
Win	95.	1967	City of Barranquilla Championships	Clay	(France) Françoise Dürr	6-3, 6-4
Win	96.	1967	Caracas International Championships	Clay	(United Kingdom) Virginia Wade	6-2, 6-3
Win	97.	1967	Curaçao International Championships	Clay	(France) Françoise Dürr	6-1, 6-2
Win	98.	1967	Pan American Championships	Clay	(Mexico) Elena Subirats	6-4, 6-3
Win	99.	1967	Caribe Hilton Invitational	Clay	(United Kingdom) Virginia Wade	7-5, 6-1
Win	100.	1967	Masters Invitational	Clay	(Australia) Jan O'Neill	6–4, 1–6, 6–3
Win	101.	1967	Kent Championships	Grass	(United Kingdom) Virginia Wade	6–3, 1–6, 6–3
Win	102.	1967	Essex Championships	Grass	(Australia) Gail Sherriff	6-0, 6-2
Win	103.	1968	Copa Altimira International Invitation	Clay	(United States) Julie Heldman	6-0, 6-2
↓ Open Era ↓
Win	104.	1968	Aix-en-Provence Pros	Hard	(France) Françoise Dürr	divided title
Win	105.	1968	Madison Square Garden Pro	Hard (i)	(United States) Billie Jean King	6-4, 6-4
Win	106.	1968	London Open Grass Court Championships	Grass	(United States) Nancy Richey	divided title
Win	107.	1968	Colonial Pro Invitation	Clay	(United States) Billie Jean King	6-1, 6-2
Win	108.	1968	South Texas Invitational Pro Tennis Championship	Hard	(United States) Rosemary Casals	6-2, 6-2
Win	109.	1968	South American Open Championships	Clay	(United States) Nancy Richey	default
Win	110.	1969	New Zealand Open	Grass	(Australia) Karen Krantzcke	6-1, 6-1
Win	111.	1969	Monte Carlo Open	Clay	(United Kingdom) Virginia Wade	6-1, 6-3
Win	112.	1969	Nagoya Pros	Hard	(France) Françoise Dürr	6-3, 6-1
Win	113.	1969	Osaka Pros	Hard	(France) Françoise Dürr	6-2, 2-0 ret.
Win	114.	1969	Belgian International Open	Clay	(United States) Rosie Casals	6-4, 6-0
Win	115.	1969	Rothmans London Grass Court Open	Grass	(United Kingdom) Winnie Shaw	6-0, 6-1
Win	116.	1969	Wimbledon Championships	Grass	(United States) Billie Jean King	3–6, 6–3, 6–2
Win	117.	1969	Golden Racquet Open	Clay	(France) Françoise Dürr	6-1, 6-1
Win	118.	1969	Monte-Carlo Open Championships	Clay	(United Kingdom) Virginia Wade	6–2, 6–3
Win	119.	1969	British Open Indoors	Carpet (i)	(United States) Billie Jean King	6-1, 6-1
Win	120.	1970	Orange Free State Championships	Hard	(United States) Peaches Bartkowicz	6-4, 8-6
Win	121.	1970	Western Province Championships	Hard	(United States) Peaches Bartkowicz	6-1, 6-2
Win	122.	1970	New Zealand Open	Grass	(Australia) Kerry Melville	0–6, 6–4, 6–1
Win	123.	1970	Bio-Strath London Hard Court Championships	Clay	(United Kingdom) Joyce Williams	6–1, 4–6, 6–4
Win	124.	1970	Rothmans Surrey Grass Court Championships	Grass	(United States) Patti Hogan	2–6, 6–3, 6–4
Win	125.	1970	Chichester International	Grass	(United Kingdom) Joyce Williams	6-4, 6-4
Win	126.	1970	Istanbul International Championships	Clay	(United Kingdom) Winnie Shaw	6-4, 6-1
Win	127.	1970	Dewar Cup Torquay	Carpet (i)	(United Kingdom) Virginia Wade	6-4, 6-1
Win	128.	1971	Caribe Hilton Championships	Hard	(United States) Nancy Richey Gunter	6-4, 6-4
Win	129.	1971	Caesar's Palace World Pro Championships	Hard	(United States) Billie Jean King	7-5, 6-4
Win	130.	1974	Slazenger Torquay Open	Carpet (i)	(United States) Janet Newberry	7-5, 7-6
Win	131.	1975	Slazenger Torquay Open	Carpet (i)	(United Kingdom) Winnie Wooldridge	4–6, 6–1, 6–3
Win	132.	1975	Midland Counties Championships	Grass	(Netherlands) Inge Korsten	6-0, 6-1
Win	133.	1975	Tally-Ho! Open Tennis Championships	Clay	(United Kingdom) Julia Lloyd	6-1, 6-3
Win	134.	1977	Red Hackle West of Scotland Championships	Grass	(Sweden) Helena Anliot	6-3, 7-5
Win	135.	1977	Essex Championships	Grass	(United Kingdom) Debra Parker	6-3, 7-5
Win	136.	1977	Midland Counties Championships	Grass	(United Kingdom) Corinne Molesworth	6-4, 6-4

Amateur titles														Professional titles					
1955	1956	1957	1958	1959	1960	1961	1962	1963	1964	1965	1966	1967	1968	1969	1970	1971	1974	1975	1977
3	5	5	3	3	16	9	12	12	6	8	7	11	7	9	8	2	1	3	3

== See also ==
- Performance timelines for all female tennis players since 1978 who reached at least one Grand Slam final
- List of England players at the World Team Table Tennis Championships

Awards
Preceded by David Hemery	BBC Sports Personality of the Year; 1969	Succeeded by Henry Cooper
