= Pan American Championships (tennis) =

Campeonatos Panamericanos

Defunct tennis tournament
- Tour: ILTF Circuit
- Founded: 1943; 82 years ago
- Abolished: 1969; 56 years ago
- Location: Mexico City, Mexico
- Venue: Centro Deportivo Chapultepec
- Surface: Clay

The Pan-American Championships also known as the Campeonatos Panamericanos was a men's and women's clay court tennis tournament established in 1943 and played at the Centro Deportivo Chapultepec, Mexico City, Mexico until 1969.

== History ==
The Pan-American Championships or Torneo Panamericano de Tenis was established in 1943, and played on clay courts at the Centro Deportivo Chapultepec, Mexico City, Mexico. The championships were staged annually until 1969 when they were discontinued.

== Finals ==
=== Men's Singles ===
Incomplete roll

Results included:

Year	Champion	Runner-up	Score
1943	(Ecuador) Pancho Segura	(United States) Bill Talbert	4-6, 6–4, 6–2, 2–6, 6-3
1944	(Ecuador) Pancho Segura (2)	(United States) Bill Talbert	1-6, 6–3, 6–2, 1–6, 6-1
1945	(United States) Frank Parker	(Ecuador) Pancho Segura	9-7, 3–6, 6–2, 8-6
1946	(United States) Frank Parker (2)	(Ecuador) Pancho Segura	6-4, 6–8, 6–3, 5–7, 6-1
1947	(Czechoslovakia) Jaroslav Drobný	(Ecuador) Pancho Segura	4-6, 7–9, 6–3, 6–4, 6-4
1948	(Czechoslovakia) Jaroslav Drobný (2)	(South Africa) Eric Sturgess	9-7, 6–2, 6-2
1949	(United States) Frank Parker (3)	(Czechoslovakia) Jaroslav Drobný	6-1, 2–6, 6–3, 6-4
1950	(Philippines) Felicisimo Ampon	(United States) Tom Brown	6-3, 6–8, 6–4, 6-3
1951	(United States) Grant Golden	(United States) Jerry De Witts	6-3, 6-1, 6-2
1952	(United States) Gardnar Mulloy	(United States) Art Larsen	7-9, 8–6, 7–5, 4–6, 7-5
1953	(United States) Tony Trabert	(Denmark) Kurt Nielsen	6-2, 6–4, 6-1
1954	(United States) Tony Trabert (2)	(Mexico) Mario Llamas	2-6, 6–2, 6–2, 6-2
1955	(United States) Art Larsen	(Mexico) Mario Llamas	6-4, 8–6, 10–12, 6-4
1956	(Sweden) Sven Viktor Davidson	(Mexico) Mario Llamas	6-4, 6–4, 6-2
1957	(Chile) Luis Ayala	(Australia) Bob Howe	6-4, 6–4, 6-4
1958	(Mexico) Mario Llamas	(Mexico) Francisco Contreras	1-6, 6–3, 6–4, 6-2
1959	(Mexico) Mario Llamas (2)	(Mexico) Antonio Palafox	6-4, 6–4, 6-1
1960	?	?	?
1961	(Australia) Roy Emerson	(Australia) Rod Laver	4-6, 6–4, 6–4, 6-2
1962	(Spain) Manuel Santana	(Australia) Rod Laver	6-3, 6–4, 5–7, 7-5
1963	(Mexico) Mario Llamas (3)	(Australia) Roy Emerson	0-6, 6–4, 6–2, 10-8
1964	(Brazil) Ronald Barnes	(Brazil) Thomaz Koch	6-4, 6–3, 4–6, 6-3
1965	(Spain) Manuel Santana (2)	(India) Ramanathan Krishnan	6-3, 6–3, 4–6, 9-7
1966	(Australia) Tony Roche	(Mexico) Rafael Osuna	7-5, 4–6, 7–5, 6-3
1967	(Australia) Tony Roche (2)	(Australia) John Newcombe	4-6, 3–6, 7–5, 6–3, 8-6
↓ Open era ↓
1968	(Mexico) Rafael Osuna	(Mexico) Joaquin Loyo Mayo	6-4, 6–4, 6-4
1969	(Brazil) Thomaz Koch	(Mexico) Rafael Osuna	6-3, 6–4, 10-8

=== Women's Singles ===
Incomplete roll

(two editions of event played January * & October **)

Year	Champion	Runner-up	Score
1943 *	(United States) Pauline Betz	(United States) Doris Hart	6-2, 6-3
1943 **	(United States) Pauline Betz (2)	(United States) Dorothy Bundy	7-5, 6-5
1944	(United States) Pauline Betz (3)	(United States) Margaret Osborne	6-1, 7-5
1945	(United States) Mary Arnold	(United States) Patricia Canning Todd	6-8, 6-3, 6-3
1946	(United States) Pauline Betz (4)	(United States) Margaret Osborne	6-4, 15-13
1947	(Australia) Nancye Wynne Bolton	(United States) Mary Arnold Prentiss	6-2, 6-3
1948	(South Africa) Sheila Piercey Summers	(United States) Dottie Head	11-9, 6-2
1949	(United States) Doris Hart	(United Kingdom) Betty Clements Hilton	6-1, 2-6, 6-3
1950	(United States) Beverly Baker	(United States) Pat Canning Todd	6-1, 7-5
1951	(United States) Dottie Head	(United States) Anita Kanter	6-1, 6-3
1952	(United States) Shirley Fry	(Australia) Thelma Coyne Long	6-4, 6-4
1953	(United States) Maureen Connolly	(United States) Shirley Fry	6-1, 6-1
1954	(United States) Beverly Baker Fleitz	(United States) Barbara Breit	7-5, 8-6
1955	(United Kingdom) Angela Mortimer	(United States) Mary Ann Mitchell	6-3, 6-3
1956	(United States) Althea Gibson	(United States) Darlene Hard	8-6, 6-4
1957	(Mexico) Rosie Reyes	(Mexico) Yola Ramírez	6-3, 6-3
1958	(Mexico) Yola Ramírez	(Mexico) Rosie Reyes	6-0, 6-3
1959	(United Kingdom) Ann Haydon	(Mexico) Yola Ramírez	6-2, 7-5
1960	(United Kingdom) Ann Haydon (2)	(Mexico) Yola Ramírez	6-2, 6-4
1961	(Mexico) Yola Ramírez (3)	(United Kingdom) Ann Haydon	6-2, 6-3
1962	(Mexico) Yola Ramírez (4)	(United Kingdom) Elizabeth Starkie	6-3, 6-1
1963	(Mexico) Melita Ramírez	(Mexico) Olga de Palafox	6-4, 6-1
1964	(Mexico) Yola Ramirez Ochoa (5)	(France) Françoise Dürr	6-4, 4–6, 6-3
1965	(Australia) Margaret Smith	(France) Monique Salfati	6-4, 6-2
1966	(Argentina) Norma Baylon	(Australia) Gail Sherriff	default
1967	(United Kingdom) Ann Haydon Jones (3)	(Mexico) Elena Subirats	6-3, 6-4
↓ Open era ↓
1968	(United States) Julie Heldman	(United Kingdom) Ann Haydon Jones	default
1969	(United States) Valerie Ziegenfuss	(Mexico) Lulu Gongorga	1-6, 7–5, 6-2

== See also ==
- Category:National and multi-national tennis tournaments
