= Natal Sugar Circuit Open Championships =

Natal Sugar Circuit Open Tennis Championships

Defunct tennis tournament
- Tour: ILTF Sugar Circuit
- Founded: 1962
- Abolished: 1981
- Location: Durban, KwaZulu-Natal, South Africa
- Surface: Hard (outdoor)

The Natal Sugar Circuit Open Championships was a men's and women's international tennis tournament founded in 1962 in Durban, KwaZulu-Natal, South Africa as the Natal Sugar Circuit Championships. Its sponsorship name was the Hulett Natal Sugar Circuit Open Championships It was the sugar circuit series finales event. The tournament ended in 1981.

== History ==
The Natal Championships were founded in 1884 and first staged Pietermaritzburg, KwaZulu-Natal, South Africa. In 1962 the Natal Sugar Championships were founded as part of the Sugar Circuit (f. 1962) of tennis tournaments from the 1960s to 1980s. In 1962 and 1972 only men's tournament was also valid as the Natal Championships.

In 1980 the tournament was ended due to the withdraw of sponsorship by South African Sugar Association. The event was staged at Umhlali during the final four years of the women's event. In later years the tournament had switched to hard courts. The event was usually run between the middle two weeks of July each year.

== Finals ==
=== Men's singles ===
(Incomplete roll)

Natal Sugar Championships
1962	(United Kingdom) Mike Sangster	(South Africa) Gaetan Koenig	6-4, 6-3, 6-1
1963	(West Germany) Wilhelm Bungert	(South Africa) Abe Segal	Title shared due to rain.
Open era
Natal Sugar Open Championships
1970	(South Africa) Keith Diepraam	(United Kingdom) Graham Stilwell	6-4, 6-4, 6-4
1971	(Spain) Manuel Santana	(Denmark) Jan Leschly	6-4, 6-3, 6-1
1972	(West Germany) Jürgen Fassbender	(Spain) Juan Gisbert	6-3, 6-4, 6-2
1974	(United States) Raz Reid	(South Africa) Deon Joubert	6-2, 6-1

=== Women's singles ===
(Incomplete roll)

Natal Sugar Championships
1962	(United Kingdom) Ann Haydon	(South Africa) Annette Van Zyl	6-2, 6-0
1963	(South Africa) Margaret Hunt	(South Africa) Renée Schuurman	7-5, 4-6, 6-3
1964	(United States) Darlene Hard	(South Africa) Annette Van Zyl	6-1, 6-2
1965	(South Africa) Ingrid Frohling	(South Africa) Heather Segal	1-6, 6-0, 6-4
1966	(South Africa) Annette Van Zyl	(United Kingdom) Ann Haydon Jones	4-6, 6-3, 6-4
1967	(Rhodesia) Pat Walkden	(United Kingdom) Virginia Wade	6-2, 9-7
1968	(South Africa) Annette Van Zyl	(United States) Carole Caldwell Graebner	6-1, 6-1
Open era
Natal Sugar Open Championships
1969	(United States) Billie Jean Moffitt King	(South Africa) Annette Du Plooy	6-4, 6-1
1970	(United States) Billie Jean Moffitt King (2)	(Australia) Margaret Smith Court	6-4, 2-6, 6-2
1971	(Australia) Margaret Smith Court	(United States) Patti Hogan	6-2, 6-1
1972	(South Africa) Brenda Kirk	(South Africa) Pat Walkden Pretorius	6-3, 6-3
1973	(United States) Sharon Walsh	(South Africa) Pat Walkden Pretorius	0-6, 6-3, 6-4
1974	(United States) Sharon Walsh (2)	(South Africa) Brenda Kirk	6-2, 6-1
1975	(South Africa) Linky Boshoff	(South Africa) Greer Stevens	0-6, 6-0, 6-4
1976	(South Africa) Brenda Kirk Dimitriou (2)	(South Africa) Alison McMillan	6-1, 6-2
1977	(South Africa) Elizabeth Vlotman	(South Africa) Alison McMillan McDade	6-3, 6-2
1978	(South Africa) Alison McMillan McDade	(South Africa) Elizabeth Vlotman	7-5, 6-2
1979	(South Africa) Elizabeth Vlotman (2)	(South Africa) Alison McMillan McDade	7-5, 6-2
1980	(South Africa) Elvyn Barrable	(South Africa) Ms Muller	3-6, 6-4, 6-4
1981	(South Africa) Rene Uys	(South Africa) Beverly Mould	3-6, 6-1, 6-2
