= Sugar Circuit =

Tennis tour

Details
- Duration: 1962–1980
- Edition: 19
- Tournaments: 6

Achievements (singles)

The Sugar Circuit also known as the Sugar Winter Circuit or Sugar Tennis Circuit was a series tour of six South African tennis tournaments sponsored by the South African Sugar Association founded in 1962 and was sub-circuit of the worldwide ILTF Circuit that ran until 1980. In 1980 the South African Sugar Association ceased its sponsorship of the circuit and it was discontinued.

== History ==
In 1962 the Sugar Circuit was established that consisted of five provincial championships at Bloemfontein, Cape Town, Durban, East London, Pietermaritzburg and Port Elizabeth. The circuit was sponsored by the South African Sugar Association for its entire duration, individual association members such as Hulett's sponsored individual tournaments. Participation by overseas international players was by of an invitation to compete on the circuit. The scheduling of the circuit usually taking place in the winter, with events being played from December to January. In 1973 local black tennis players were allowed to compete for the first time. In 1980 circuit was discontinued due to the South African Sugar Association not renewing its sponsorship.

== Tournaments ==
#	Tournament	Surface	Location
1.	Border Championships	Hard	East London
2.	Eastern Province Championships	Hard	Port Elizabeth
3.	Natal Sugar Circuit Open Championships	Hard	Durban
4.	Orange Free State Championships	Clay	Bloemfontein
5.	South African Sugar Circuit Masters	Hard	Durban
6.	Western Province Championships	Grass/Hard	Cape Town
