= Lowther Open =

Defunct tennis tournament
- Tour: ILTF World Open Circuit
- Founded: 1921
- Abolished: 1969
- Location: Barnes, Surrey; England
- Venue: Lowther LTC
- Category: Open
- Surface: Grass / outdoor

The Lowther Open was a LTA/ILTF affiliated grass court open international tennis tournament founded in 1921. It was played at the Lowther LTC, in Barnes, Surrey, England usually in June. The event ran annually until 1969 when it was discontinued. The venue also staged a hard court event on clay held in April.

== Past finals ==
=== Mens singles ===
(incomplete roll).

Year	Champion	Runner-Up	Score
1921	(United Kingdom) Charles P. Dixon	(United Kingdom) Major Ritchie	6–3, 6–4
1922	(Canada) Henry Mayes	(Sweden) Carl-Erik von Braun	walkover
1945	(United Kingdom) Derrick Barton	(Australia) Gordon Bryant Schwartz	6–4, 8–6, 6–1
1946	(Republic of China (1912–1949)) Y.Y. Chan	(United Kingdom) Bobby Thorn	3– 6, 6–4, 7–5
1947	(United Kingdom) L. Derrick Leyland	(United Kingdom) Dickie Ritchie	6–4, 6–3
1948	(United Kingdom) Jimmy Jones	(United Kingdom) Francis Wallis	7–5, 9–7
1949	(United Kingdom) Jimmy Jones	(United Kingdom) George Godsell	6–2, 1–6, 6–1
1950	(United Kingdom) Gerry Oakley	(United Kingdom) Jimmy Jones	7–5, 6–2
1951	(Sweden) Sven Davidson	(United States) Jack Morrison	6–4, 6–3
1952	(United Kingdom) L. Derrick Leyland	(Kenya) R.J.E. Mayers	10–8, 6–4
1953	(India) Ramanathan Krishnan	(United Kingdom) Keith Lavarack	3–6, 6–0, 6–1
1954	(Australia) Pat Molloy	(United Kingdom) Ed Bulmer	6–2, 6–1
1955	(United Kingdom) Ed Bulmer	(United Kingdom) Reg Kaley	6–1, 9–7
1956	(United Kingdom) Norman Kitovitz	(United Kingdom) Gordon Mudge	6–4, 6–1
1957	(United Kingdom) Alan Mills	(United Kingdom) Derek Collins	6–2, 8–6
1958	(South Africa) Lennart Plougmann	(United Kingdom) Norman Kitovitz	6–0, 5–7, 6–3
1959	(United Kingdom) Julian Coni	(South Africa) William Jacobson	6–4, 2–6, 6–3
1960	(United Kingdom) Norman Kitovitz (2)	(United Kingdom) G.J. Holdsworth	6–3, 6–2
1961	(Australia) Adrian Bey	(South Africa) Robin Sanders	6–4, 2–6, 8–6
1962	(Japan) Osamu Ishiguro	(Japan) Michio Fujii	6–1, 7–5
1963	(Guyana) Charles Tang	(United Kingdom) Reg Bennett	6–4, 6–3
1964	(United States) Lester Sack	(Pakistan) Munir Pirzada	3–6, 6–0, 7–5
1965	(Netherlands) Paul De Zeeuw	(Thailand) Felix Bautista Jr.	6–2, 6–4
1966	(United Kingdom) Colin McHugo	(India) Vinay Dhawan	10–8, 6–3
1967	(India) Shyam Minotra	(United States) Peyton Watson	6–3, 7–5
1968	(Japan) Koji Watanabe	(New Zealand) Onny Parun	6–2, 2–6, 6–1
1969	(South Africa) Derek Schroder	(Australia) Max Senior	5–7, 6–1, 6–2

=== Womens singles ===
(incomplete roll)

Year	Champion	Runner-Up	Score
1921	(United Kingdom) Phyllis Howkins	(United Kingdom) Doris Craddock	6–2, 2–6, 6–4
1922	(United Kingdom) Aurea Edgington	(United Kingdom) Ada Spencer Hollick	6–2, 6–2
1938-1944	Not held (due to World War II)		
1945	(United Kingdom) Valerie Miles	(United Kingdom) Patsy Rodgers	6–2, 6–4
1946	(United Kingdom) Joan Ingram	(Czechoslovakia) Dorrit Herbst	6–3, 6–2
1947	(United Kingdom) Peggy Dawson-Scott	(United Kingdom) Patsy Rodgers	6–1, 6–3
1948	(United Kingdom) Betty Wilford	(United Kingdom) Mrs M.M. Luger	6–2, 6–1
1949	(United Kingdom) Betty Wilford (2)	(United Kingdom) Georgie Woodgate	6–3, 5–7, 8–6
1950	(United Kingdom) Susan Partridge	(United Kingdom) Georgie Woodgate	6–3, 6–2
1951	(United Kingdom) Susan Partridge (2)	(United Kingdom) Peggy Dawson-Scott	6–2, 6–4
1952	(United Kingdom) Betty Wilford (3)	(United Kingdom) Gem Hoahing	5–7, 6–3, 8–6
1953	(United Kingdom) Molly Blair	(United Kingdom) Valerie Pitt	6–3, 6–2
1954	(United Kingdom) Georgie Woodgate	(United Kingdom) Valerie Pitt	7–5, 6–3
1955	(United Kingdom) Pearl Panton	(United Kingdom) Peggy Dawson-Scott	6–3, 6–2
1956	(United Kingdom) Elaine Watson	(United Kingdom) Rosemary Deloford	6–3, 10–8
1957	(United Kingdom) Jill Rook	(United Kingdom) Pat Wheeler	6–4, 6–4
1958	(United Kingdom) Rosemary Deloford	(Australia) Norma Marsh	6–2, 2–6, 11–9
1959	(Canada) Hanna Sladek	(United Kingdom) Jennifer Wagstaff	6–3, 10–8
1960	(United Kingdom) Pauline Roberts	(United Kingdom) Pat Wheeler	6–1, 1–6, 6–2
1961	(United Kingdom) Ann Haydon	(United Kingdom) Shirley Brasher	6–1, 6–2
1962	(United Kingdom) Pauline Roberts (2)	(United Kingdom) Pat Wheeler Roberts	6–2, 4–6, 6–2
1963	(Australia) Robin Lesh	(Canada) Hanna Sladek	7–5, 6–2
1964	(Australia) Robin Lesh (2)	(United Kingdom) Vera Roberts	6–2, 6–4
1965	(Australia) Trish McClenaughan	(United Kingdom) Vera Roberts	6–3, 6–4
1966	(United Kingdom) Shirley Brasher	(United Kingdom) Rosemary Deloford	6–1, 6–3
1967	(United Kingdom) Mrs W Collins	(United Kingdom) Wendy Hall	7–9, 7–5, 6–4
1968	(United Kingdom) Shirley Brasher (2)	(United Kingdom) Corinne Molesworth	6–4, 6–8, 6–4
1969	(United Kingdom) Corinne Molesworth	(United Kingdom) Shirley Brasher	6–4, 7–5
