= Robert Spiess =

German tennis player

- Full name: Robert Cleon Spiess
- Country (sports): Germany
- Born: 17 February 1891 Moscow, Russia
- Died: 22 October 1982 (aged 91)
- Turned pro: 1910 (amateur tour)
- Retired: 1936

Singles
- Career record: 29–23
- Career titles: 6

Grand Slam singles results
- Wimbledon: 1R (1914)

Doubles

Grand Slam doubles results
- Wimbledon: QF (1914)

Robert Cleon Spiess (17 February 1891 – 22 October 1982) also known as Robert Spies (anglicized name) was a German tennis player. He competed in two events at the 1912 Summer Olympics in Sweden. He was a quarter finalist in the men's doubles at the 1914 Wimbledon Championships partnered with Luis Maria Heyden. His biggest singles title wins were at the German International Covered Court Championships which he won two times in 1920 and 1926, and the German National Championships in 1912. He was active from 1910 to 1936 and won 6 career singles titles.

== Career ==
Spiess played his first tournament in 1910 at the Geneva Spring Tournament. The same year he won his first title at the Caux International in Montreux against A. Félix Poulin. He won the German National Championships in 1912, and German International Covered Court Championships twice in 1920 and 1926. He also won the Championships of Bremen in 1924. He won his final title at the Bremen Closed Championships in 1936.

He also took part in the 1914 Wimbledon Championships losing in the first round to Frank Jarvis, whilst in England he also played at the Northern Championships where he lost in round two to Stanley Doust.

Additionally, he was also a losing finalist at the Les Avants Championship in 1910, defeated by Val Miley, the Norderney Spa Championship in 1911, beaten by Carl Lange, the Championship of Braunschweig losing to Heinrich Schomburgk, and the Saint-Étienne International where he lost to Friedrich Wilhelm Rahe.
