= Eastern Province Championships =

Defunct tennis tournament
- Tour: ILTF Circuit
- Founded: 1904; 121 years ago
- Abolished: 1981; 44 years ago
- Location: Port Elizabeth, Eastern Cape Province, South Africa
- Venue: Port Elizabeth Lawn Tennis Club
- Surface: Hard

The Eastern Province Championships was a men's and women's international tennis tournament established in 1904 as the Eastern State Championships and was played on outdoor hard courts at the Port Elizabeth Lawn Tennis Club, Port Elizabeth, Eastern Cape Province, South Africa until 1981.

== History ==
The Eastern Province Championships were established in 1904 and organised by the Border Tennis Union. The championships were part of the Sugar Circuit (f. 1962) of tennis tournaments from the 1960s to 1980s. In 1980 the tournament was ended due to the withdraw of sponsorship by South African Sugar Association.

== Venues ==
The championships were staged at the Port Elizabeth Lawn Tennis Club, Port Elizabeth, Eastern Cape Province, South Africa.
