= Carlyon Bay Covered Court Championships =

Defunct tennis tournament
- Tour: ILTF Circuit
- Founded: 1936; 89 years ago
- Abolished: 1967; 58 years ago
- Location: St. Austell, Cornwall, England
- Venue: Cornish Riviera Club
- Surface: Wood (indoors)

The Carlyon Bay Covered Court Championships was a combined men's and women's indoor wood court tennis tournament founded in 1936. The tournament was held at the Riviera Club, St. Austell, Cornwall, England until 1967.

== History ==
In the early 1930s the Cornish Riviera Club was constructed that included two large indoor tennis courts. In 1936 Carlyon Bay Covered Court Championships were established. In the late 1960s the tournament was ended due to the venue becoming a live music venue and was renamed as the New Cornish Riviera Lido. The venue later became known as the Cornwall Coliseum.

== Finals ==
=== Men's singles ===
(incomplete roll)

| Year | Champions | Runners-up | Score |
|---|---|---|---|
| 1936 | (United Kingdom) Murray Deloford | (United Kingdom) Frank Wilde | 6-3, 1–6, 8–6, 6-2 |
| 1937 | (Republic of Ireland) George Lyttleton-Rogers | (United Kingdom) Henry Billington | 6-4, 4–6, 6–3, 6-1 |
| 1938 | (Sweden) Kalle Schröder | (United Kingdom) Donald Butler | 6-2, 3–6, 6–4, 6-4 |
| 1939 | (United Kingdom) Bunny Austin | (Japan) Jiro Sato | 7-5, 7–5, 3–6, 6-4 |
| 1940/1946 | Not held (due to World War II) | | |
| 1955 | (Austria) Alfred Huber | (United Kingdom) Billy Knight | 6-4, 6–4, 6-3 |
| 1957 | (Poland) Ignacy Tłoczyński | (Poland) Andrzej Licis | 6-3, 6–3, 6-3 |
| 1960 | (Poland) Andrzej Licis | (Australia) Bob Carmichael | 7-5, 7–5, 6-4 |
| 1962 | (United Kingdom) Bobby Wilson | (Poland) Andrzej Licis | 6-4, 3–6, 6-2 |
| 1963 | (New Zealand) Ron McKenzie | (United Kingdom) Alan Mills | 6-1, 7-5 |
| 1964 | (United Kingdom) Gerald Battrick | (Poland) Andrzej Licis | 3-6, 6–3, 6-4 |
| 1965 | (United Kingdom) Bobby Wilson (2) | (United Kingdom) Alan Mills | 6-3, 6-2 |

=== Women's singles ===
(incomplete roll)

| Year | Champions | Runners-up | Score |
|---|---|---|---|
| 1936 | (Chile) Anita Lizana | (United Kingdom) Peggy Scriven | 6-4, 6-2 |
| 1937 | (United Kingdom) Peggy Scriven | (United Kingdom) Ermyntrude Harvey | 6-4, 4–6, 6-3 |
| 1939 | (Denmark) Hilde Sperling | (United Kingdom) Mary Hardwick | 6-4, 4–6, 6-2 |
| 1940/1946 | Not held (due to World War II) | | |
| 1949 | (United Kingdom) Joan Curry | (United Kingdom) Gem Hoahing | 6-4, 6–4, 6-3 |
| 1953 | (United Kingdom) Shirley Bloomer | (United Kingdom) Rita Bentley | 6-2, 6-3 |
| 1961 | (United Kingdom) Angela Mortimer | (United Kingdom) Deidre Catt | 6-1, 6-3 |
| 1962 | (United Kingdom) Angela Mortimer (2) | (United Kingdom) Ann Haydon Jones | 6-3, 6-4 |
| 1963 | (United Kingdom) Ann Haydon Jones | (United Kingdom) Deidre Catt | 6-4, 6-3 |
| 1964 | (United Kingdom) Ann Haydon Jones (2) | (Australia) Fay Toyne | 9-7, 6-4 |
| 1965 | (United Kingdom) Ann Haydon Jones (3) | (United Kingdom) Virginia Wade | 7-5, 6-2 |
