= German Indoor Championships =

Defunct tennis tournament
- Tour: ILTF Circuit; Grand Prix Circuit
- Founded: 1911; 115 years ago
- Abolished: 1981; 45 years ago
- Location: Bremen; Cologne; Hamburg; Munich; Stuttgart
- Surface: Wood (indoors); Hard (indoors)

The German Indoor Championships or officially the West German Indoor Championships was a men's and women's international open tennis tournament founded in 1911 as the German Covered Court Championships or German International Covered Court Championships and first played on indoor wood courts at the Bremen Tennis Club. The tournament was mainly held in Bremen, West Germany, but was also played at other locations for the duration of its run. In 1981 the championships were last held in Stuttgart then it was discontinued.

== History ==
In 1911 German indoor championships were established at the Bremen Tennis Club, Bremen, Germany. In 1955 the tournament was rebranded as the West German Covered Court Championships. or West German International Covered Court Championships. In 1966 the tournaments name was changed again to the West German Indoor Championships.

The championships were mainly played Bremen Tennis Club (f.1896), Bremen, Germany which had built an indoor facility for staging this tournament. The championships continued to be held in Bremen until 1939. In 1940 the event moved to Hamburg until 1941. From 1942 till tournament was not held due to World War Two and the rebuilding of Germany under the Marshall Plan.

In 1955 the tournament was revived under a new title as the West German Covered Court Championships and, moved to Cologne it remained there until 1961. In 1962 the championships were moved back to Bremen then they alternated between Cologne and the former until 1969. In 1970 the event moved to Munich for one edition only, before returning to Bremen till 1979. In 1980 the German Indoor Championships were moved to Stuttgart and remained there until 1981 when they were abolished.

== Surface ==
The championships were played almost exclusively of indoor wood courts from inception until 1973 at all locations. The tournament then continued to played on indoor hard courts and indoor carpet courts until 1981.

== Finals ==
=== Men's singles ===
(incomplete roll)

German Covered Court Championships
Year	Location	Champions	Runners-up	Score
1911	Bremen	(France) Max Decugis	(United States) Clarence Phelps Dodge	6–1, 6–2, 8–6
1912	Bremen	(France) Max Decugis (2)	(Germany) Robert Spiess	6–0, 6–2, 9–7
1913	Bremen	(Germany) Oscar Kreuzer	(Germany) Curt Bruno Bergmann	2-6, 6–0, 6–2, 6–4
1914	Bremen	(Germany) Curt Bruno Bergmann	(Denmark) Harald Waagepetersen	6–1, 5-7 6–1
1915/1919	Not held (due to World War I)			
German International Covered Court Championships
1920	Bremen	(Germany) Robert Cleon Spiess	(Germany) Friedrich Wilhelm Rahe	6–2, 6–0, 6–1
1921	Bremen	(Germany) Friedrich Wilhelm Rahe	(Germany) Robert Cleon Spiess	7–9, 6–2, 6–1 ret.
1922	Bremen	(Germany) Friedrich Wilhelm Rahe (2)	(Germany) Robert Cleon Spiess	6–3, 6–4, 5-7, 6–2
1923	Bremen	(Germany) Friedrich Wilhelm Rahe (3)	(Germany) Hans Moldenhauer	6–4, 6–1, 9–7
1924	Bremen	(Germany) Willi Hahnemann	(Germany) Friedrich Wilhelm Rahe	6–3, 9–7, 7–5
1925	Bremen	(Germany) Friedrich Wilhelm Rahe (4)	(Germany) Robert Cleon Spiess	6–2, 8–6, 2-6, 3-6, 7–5
1926	Bremen	(Germany) Robert Cleon Spiess (2)	(Hungary) Bela Von Kehrling	6–0, 4-6, 6–3, 6–2
1927	Bremen	(Denmark) Einer Ulrich	(Denmark) Axel Petersen	4-6, 6–4, 9–7, 6–4
1928	Bremen	(Denmark) Axel Petersen	(Germany) Daniel Prenn	6–3, 6–2, 6–1
1929	Bremen	(Denmark) Axel Petersen (2)	(Germany) Walter Dessart	7–5, 5-7, 6–0
1930	Bremen	(Sweden) Curt Östberg	(Denmark) Einer Ulrich	6–3, 2-6, 6–3
1931	Bremen	(France) Pierre Henri Landry	(Denmark) Einer Ulrich	6–3, 2-6, 6–3
1932	Bremen	(France) Pierre Henri Landry (2)	(Sweden) Curt Ostberg	6–4, 6–2, 7–5
1933	Bremen	(Germany) Gottfied von Cramm	(Germany) Josef Hirtz	7–5, 0-6, 3-6, 6–3, 7–5
1934	Bremen	(Germany) Gottfied von Cramm (2)	(France) Pierre Henri Landry	6–1, 2-6, 4-6, 6–4, 6–2
1935	Bremen	(Germany) Gottfied von Cramm (3)	(France) Marcel Bernard	12-14, 6–0, 6–2, 4-6, 8–6
1936	Bremen	(Switzerland) Max Ellmer	(Socialist Federal Republic of Yugoslavia) Josip Palada	2-6, 6–4, 2-6, 6–3, 6–0
1937	Bremen	(Germany) Gottfied von Cramm (4)	(Germany) Henner Henkel	6–4, 6–2, 3-6, 6–3
1938	Bremen	(Sweden) Kalle Schröder	(Germany) Rolf Göpfert	6–1, 6–1, 5-7, 5-7, 7–5
1939	Bremen	(Czechoslovakia) Roderich Menzel	(Germany) Henner Henkel	6–4, 7–5, 6–4
1940	Hamburg	(Germany) Henner Henkel	(Germany) Engelbert Koch	8–6, 6–3, 6–4
1941	Hamburg	(Germany) Rolf Göpfert	(Germany) Henner Henkel	6–0, 6–2, 7–5
1942-54	Not held (due to World War II)			
West German International Covered Court Championships
1955	Cologne	(Italy) Giuseppe Merlo	(Italy) Orlando Sirola	8–6, 4-6, 6–3, 1-6, 6–3
1956	Cologne	(Sweden) Torsten Johansson	(Italy) Orlando Sirola	6–1, 6–2, 6–3
1957	Cologne	(France) Pierre Darmon	(Sweden) Torsten Johansson	10-8, 6–0, 9–7
1958	Cologne	(Denmark) Jorgen Ulrich	(Egypt) Jaroslav Drobný	6–4, 7–5, 2-6, 6–8, 6–3
1959	Cologne	(Egypt) Jaroslav Drobný	(Belgium) Jacques Brichant	6–2, 6–4, 6–4
1960	Cologne	(Belgium) Jacques Brichant	(Italy) Nicola Pietrangeli	4-6, 6–3, 6–1, 6–4
1961	Cologne	(United Kingdom) Bobby Wilson	(Sweden) Ulf Schmidt	2-6, 3-6, 8–6, 6–4, 7–5
1962	Bremen	(United Kingdom) Bobby Wilson (2)	(Germany) Christian Kuhnke	6–4, 6–3, 7–5
1963	Cologne	(Germany) Wilhelm Bungert	(Germany) Adolf Kreinberg	6–4, 6–3, 9–7
1964	Bremen	(United Kingdom) Bobby Wilson (3)	(France) Michel Leclercq	6–2, 6–3, 6–3
1965	Cologne	(Sweden) Jan-Erik Lundqvist	(United Kingdom) Bobby Wilson	6–4, 6–4, 3-6, 4-6, 8–6
West German Indoor Championships
1966	Bremen	(Australia) Bob Carmichael	(Germany) Ingo Buding	6–4, 6–1, 8–10, 6–3
1967	Cologne	(United Kingdom) Roger Taylor	(France) Pierre Darmon	11-9, 6–1, 3-6, 6–3
1968	Bremen	(Egypt) Ismail El Shafei	(France) Daniel Contet	6–4, 6–8, 6–4
↓ Open era ↓
1969	Cologne	(Sweden) Ove Nils Bengtson	(Germany) Christian Kuhnke	6–3, 6–3, 6–8, 6–4
1970	Munich	(United Kingdom) John Clifton	(Sweden) Håkan Zahr	6–3, 1-6 6–3
1971	Bremen	(Denmark) Jorgen Ulrich	(United Kingdom) David Lloyd	6–4, 10-8 4-6, 4-6, 6–3
1972	Bremen	(Germany) Karl Meiler	(Germany) Attila Korpás	6–3, 6–3, 6–1
1973	Bremen	(Austria) Peter Pokorny	(Poland) Tadeusz Nowicki	7–6 6–1 3-6 4-6 6–3
1974	Bremen	(South Africa) Frew McMillan	(Socialist Federal Republic of Yugoslavia) Nikola Pilić	5-7, 7–6, 7–6
1975	Bremen	(Germany) Jürgen Fassbender	(Belgium) Bernard Mignot	6–3, 6–3, 6–4
1976	Bremen	(Hungary) Balazs Taroczy	(United States) Norman Holmes	6–3, 3-6, 6–3, 6–4
1977	Bremen	(Socialist Federal Republic of Yugoslavia) Nikola Pilić	(United Kingdom) David Lloyd	7–6, 7–6, 7–6
1978	Bremen	(Germany) Werner Zirngibl	(Hungary) Péter Szőke	7–6, 6–4, 6–4
1979	Bremen	(Socialist Federal Republic of Yugoslavia) Niki Pilic	(Germany) Klaus Eberhard	6–3, 3-6, 6–2
1980	Stuttgart	(Czechoslovakia) Tomas Smid	(United Kingdom) Mark Cox	6–1, 6–3, 5-7, 1-6, 6–4
1981	Stuttgart	(Czechoslovakia) Ivan Lendl	(New Zealand) Chris Lewis	6–3, 6–0, 6–7, 6–3

=== Women' singles ===
(incomplete roll)

German Covered Court Championships
Year	Location	Champions	Runners-up	Score
1911	Bremen	(Germany) Mieken Rieck	(Germany) Doris Breyer	6–3, 3-6, 6–2
1912	Bremen	(Germany) Mieken Rieck (2)	(Germany) "Frau Larida"	6–3, 8–6
1913	Bremen	(Germany) Mieken Rieck (3)	(Germany) Daisy Schultz	6–4, 6–4
1914	Bremen	(Germany) Mieken Rieck (4)	(Germany) Else Koch	6–2, 6–1
1915-19	Not held (due to World War I)			
German International Covered Court Championships
1920	Bremen	(Germany) Mieken Rieck Galvao (5)	(Germany) Frau Gätjen	6–0, 6–2
1921	Bremen	(Germany) Gertrud Hagelin		
1922	Bremen	(Germany) Mieken Rieck Galvao (6)	(Germany) Nelly Gassmann Stephanus	4-6, 6–2, 6–2
1923	Bremen	(Sweden) Sigrid Frenckell Fick	(Germany) Mieken Rieck Galvao	6–1, 4-6, 7–5
1924	Bremen	(Germany) Nelly Neppach	(Germany) Else Klatte	6–3, 6–4
1925	Bremen	(Germany) Nelly Neppach (2)	(Germany) Paula Heimann	6–1, 6–4
1926	Bremen	(Germany) Ilse Friedleben	(Germany) Cilly Aussem	6–3, 6–4
1927	Bremen	(Germany) Ilse Friedleben (2)	(Germany) Nelly Neppach	10-8, 6–3
1928	Bremen	(Germany) Ilse Friedleben (3)	(Germany) Frl Frese	6–2, 9–7
1929	Bremen	(Germany) Irmgard Rost	(Germany) Ilse Friedleben	11-9, 2-6, 7–5
1930	Bremen	(Germany) Hilde Krahwinkel	(Germany) Ellen Hoffmann	7–5, 6–0
1931	Bremen	(Germany) Hilde Krahwinkel (2)	(Germany) Irmgard Rost	6–2, 6–3
1932	Bremen	(Germany) Hilde Krahwinkel (3)	(Germany) Klara Hammer	6–0, 6–2
1933	Bremen	(Switzerland) Lolette Payot	(Germany) Marie-Louise Horn	6–3, 2-6, 6–2
1934	Bremen	(Denmark) Hilde Sperling (4)	(Germany) Toni Schomburgk	2-6, 6–1, 6–2
1935	Bremen	(Denmark) Hilde Sperling (5)	(Switzerland) Lolette Payot	6–4, 6–1
1936	Bremen	(Denmark) Hilde Sperling (6)	(Germany) Marie-Louise Horn	6–0, 6–3
1937	Bremen	(Denmark) Hilde Sperling (7)	(Germany) Totta Zehden	6–1, 6–2
1938	Bremen	(Germany) Totta Zehden	(Austria) Trude Wolf	8–6, 6–3
1939	Bremen	(United States) Gracyn Wheeler	(Romania) Klara Somogyi	6–4, 6–4
1940	Hamburg	(Germany) Ursula Heidtmann	(Germany) Tilde Hamel Dietz	6–1, 10-12, 6–4
1941	Hamburg	(Germany) Ursula Heidtmann (2)	(Germany) Lotte Tegtmeyer	6–4 4-6 6–4
1942-54	Not held (due to World War II)			
West German International Covered Court Championships
1955	Cologne	(Sweden) Bibi Gullbrandsson	(United Kingdom) Shirley Bloomer	6–1, 1-6, 6–3
1956	Cologne	(United States) Althea Gibson	(Belgium) Christiane Mercelis	4-6, 6–3, 6–2
1957	Cologne	(United Kingdom) Anne Shilcock	(Belgium) Christiane Mercelis	6–3, 11-9
1958	Cologne	(United Kingdom) Anne Shilcock (2)	(Germany) Edda Buding	default
1959	Cologne	(Belgium) Christiane Mercelis	(Germany) Renate Ostermann	6–3, 6–4
1960	Cologne	(United Kingdom) Ann Haydon	(United Kingdom) Sheila Armstrong	6–3, 6–0
1961	Cologne	(United Kingdom) Angela Mortimer	(United Kingdom) Ann Haydon	6–2, 4-6, 6–4
1962	Bremen	(United Kingdom) Elizabeth Starkie	(Germany) Renate Ostermann	6–4, 2-6, 6–1
1963	Cologne	(United Kingdom) Ann Haydon Jones (2)	(Belgium) Christiane Mercelis	6–1, 4-6, 8–6
1964	Bremen	(United Kingdom) Christine Truman	(United Kingdom) Carole Rosser	6–4, 5-7, 6–1
1965	Cologne	(United Kingdom) Elizabeth Starkie (2)	(United Kingdom) Ann Haydon Jones	6–3, 6–4
West German Indoor Championships
1966	Bremen	(United Kingdom) Ann Haydon Jones (3)	(Germany) Helga Niessen	7–9, 7–5, 6–3
1967	Cologne	(United Kingdom) Ann Haydon Jones (4)	(Belgium) Ingrid Loeys	6–1, 6–1
1968	Bremen	(United Kingdom) Joyce Barclay Williams	(Germany) Helga Niessen	6–2, 6–1
↓ Open era ↓
1969	Cologne	(Sweden) Christina Sandberg	(United Kingdom) Christine Truman Janes	6–3, 2-6, 8–6
1970	Munich	(United Kingdom) Virginia Wade	(United Kingdom) Joyce Barclay Williams	6–2 6–4
1971	Bremen	(United Kingdom) Nell Truman	(Germany) Heide Orth	6–3, 6–3
1973	Bremen	(Sweden) Ingrid Löfdahl Bentzer	(Germany) Heide Orth	6–2, 1-6, 6–3
1976	Bremen	(United Kingdom) Linda Mottram	(Germany) Edith Winkens	6–0, 6–1
1977	Bremen	(Germany) Helga Niessen Masthoff	(Germany) Sylvia Hanika	6–4, 6–2
1978	Bremen	(Germany) Sylvia Hanika	(Germany) Heidi Eisterlehner	?
1979	Bremen	(Germany) Sylvia Hanika (2)	(Germany) Heidi Eisterlehner	6–1, 6–0
1980	Stuttgart	(Germany) Heidi Eisterlehner	(Germany) Claudia Pasquale	6–2, 6–3

== See also ==
- Category:National and multi-national tennis tournaments
