= Good Neighbor Championships =

Defunct tennis tournament
- Tour: ILTF Caribbean Circuit
- Founded: 1949; 77 years ago
- Abolished: 1965; 61 years ago
- Editions: 16
- Location: Miami Beach, Florida, United States
- Venue: Flamingo Park Tennis Club
- Surface: Clay

The Good Neighbor Championships also known as the Goodneighborhood Championships was a men's and women's international tennis tournament founded in 1949. The championships were played on outdoor clay courts at the Flamingo Park Tennis Club, Miami Beach, Florida. The tournament was part of the ILTF Caribbean Circuit and ran annually until 1965 when it was discontinued.

== Finals ==
=== Men's singles ===
Year	Champions	Runners-up	Score
1949	(United States) Earl Cochell	(United States) Gardner Larned	6–4, 6–1, 6–4
1950	(United States) Gardnar Mulloy	(United States) Tom Brown	6–4, 2–6, 6–3, 6–2
1951	(United States) Herb Flam	(United States) Gardnar Mulloy	4–6, 6–8, 7–5, 6–3, 6–1
1952	(United States) Gardnar Mulloy	(United States) Vic Seixas	6–4, 8–6, 9–7
1953	(United States) Vic Seixas	(United States) Gardnar Mulloy	6–3, 6–1, 4–6, 4–6, 6–1
1954	(United States) Vic Seixas (2)	(United States) Art Larsen	3–6, 11–9, 9–7, 6–3
1955	(United States) Tony Trabert	(United States) Vic Seixas	6–4, 8–6, 6–1
1956	(United States) Herb Flam (2)	(United States) Vic Seixas	3–6, 7–5, 6–3, 4–6, 7–5
1957	(United States) Herb Flam (3)	(Australia) Mervyn Rose	6–1, 7–5, 6–2
1958	(Australia) Mervyn Rose	(Chile) Luis Ayala	6–2, 2–6, 9–7, 6–2
1959	(Mexico) Mario Llamas	(United States) John W. Frost	6–2, 4–6, 6–3, 3–6, 7–5
1960	(Australia) Neale Fraser	(United States) Frank Froehling	5–7, 1–6, 6–2, 6–2, 6–1
1961	(Australia) Roy Emerson	(West Germany) Wolfgang Stuck	5–7, 6–4, 6–3, 3–6, 6–3
1962	(Australia) Roy Emerson (2)	(Brazil) Carlos Fernandes	6–3, 7–5, 6–2
1963	(Australia) Roy Emerson (3)	(Spain) Manuel Santana	6–4, 6–0, 6–2
1964	(Australia) Roy Emerson (4)	(Spain) Manuel Santana	7–5, 6–4, 6–2
1965	(United States) Dennis Ralston	(Brazil) Thomaz Koch	3–6, 6–3, 7–5, 6–2

=== Women's singles ===
Year	Champions	Runners-up	Score
1949	(United States) Shirley Fry	(United States) Dottie Head	3–6, 6–1, 6–4
1950	(United States) Marta Barnett Andrade	(United States) Betty Hulbert James	6–3, 6–1
1951	(United States) Althea Gibson	(Jamaica) Betty Rosenquest	6–4, 6–2
1952	(Romania) Magda Rurac	(United States) Pat Canning Todd	5–7, 8–6, retired
1953	(Australia) Thelma Coyne Long	(Mexico) Melita Ramírez	6–4, 7–5
1954	(United States) Doris Hart	(United Kingdom) Helen Fletcher	6–4, 6–4
1955	(United States) Doris Hart (2)	(United States) Dottie Head Knode	6–4, 6–1
1957	(United Kingdom) Shirley Bloomer	(United States) Darlene Hard	6–3, 7–5
1958	(Brazil) Maria Bueno	(United States) Janet Hopps	7–5, 9–7
1959	(United States) Janet Hopps	(Belgium) Christiane Mercelis	4–6, 6–2, 6–4
1960	(United Kingdom) Ann Haydon	(United States) Barbara Scofield Davidson	6–0, 6–1
1961	(United Kingdom) Ann Haydon (2)	(Hungary) Suzy Kormoczy	6–0, 6–2
1962	(South Africa) Renée Schuurman	(United Kingdom) Christine Truman	6–4, 6–4
1963	(Australia) Lesley Turner	(United States) Darlene Hard	6–0, 7–5
1964	(United States) Nancy Richey	(United States) Stephanie DeFina	6–4, 6–2
1965	(Australia) Margaret Smith	(Australia) Lesley Turner	6–2, 8–6
