= Slazenger Torquay Open =

Former English tennis tournament

Palace Hotel Covered Courts Dewar Cup Torquay Slazenger Torquay Open

Defunct tennis tournament
- Event name: Palace Hotel Covered Courts (1936-67); Dewar Cup Torquay (1968–1972)
- Tour: ILTF Mens Amateur Tour (1913-1967); ILTF Women's Amateur Tour (1913-1967)
- Sponsor: Dunlop (1936); Dewars (1968-72); Slazenger (1974-78)
- Founded: 1936
- Abolished: 1978
- Location: Torquay, Devon, Great Britain
- Venue: Palace Hotel
- Surface: Indoor (carpet)

The Slazenger Torquay Open was an indoor tennis tournament originally founded as the Palace Hotel Covered Courts in 1936 that was sponsored by the Dunlop Company for that year only. From the 1950s it was known as the Palace Hotel Covered Courts Championships, that ran until 1967. In 1968 the Scottish whisky company John Dewar & Sons became sponsors of the event, and it was rebranded as the Dewar Cup Torquay until 1972 when sponsorship ended causing the 1973 edition not being held. In 1974 the sports company Slazenger took over sponsorship of the event until 1978 when it was abolished. It was at played at the Palace Hotel, Torquay, Devon, England.

== History ==
The Palace Hotel Covered Courts tournament was founded in 1936, and was sponsored by the Dunlop Company for the first edition. It continued to be staged as an annual event under that name until 1959. In 1960 the tournament was rebranded as the Palace Hotel Covered Courts Championships through till 1967. In 1968 Dewar's then became sponsors of the Palace Hotel event, and it was rebranded as the Dewar Cup Torquay until 1972 when sponsorship ended causing the 1973 edition not being held. In 1974 Slazenger then took over sponsorship of the tournament and it was rebranced as the Slazenger Torquay Open. It was played on indoor courts at the Palace Hotel, Torquay, Devon, England

From 1968 to 1974 it was part of the fourth leg of Dewar Cup Circuit of indoor tournaments.

== Finals ==
=== Men's singles ===
Year	Champions	Runners-up	Score
Palace Hotel Covered Courts
1936	(United Kingdom) Harry Lee	(United Kingdom) Frank Wilde	6–4, 6–0
1937	(United Kingdom) Ronald Shayes	(United Kingdom) Frank Wilde	6–2, 6–4
1938	(United Kingdom) Ronald Shayes (2)	(United Kingdom) Murray Deloford	6–3, 8–6
1940– 1945	Not held (due to World War II)		
1948	(United Kingdom) Howard Walton	(United Kingdom) Donald Butler	6–2, 6–3
1949	(United Kingdom) Paddy Roberts	(Poland) Czeslaw Spychala	6–3, 2–6, 6–2
1950	(Poland) Ignacy Tłoczyński	(United Kingdom) George Godsell	6–4, 2–6, 6–4
1951	(Czechoslovakia) Jaroslav Drobný	(United Kingdom) Paddy Roberts	6–2, 6–4
1952	(United Kingdom) Tony Mottram	(United Kingdom) John Horn	3–6, 6–1, 6–0
1953	(United Kingdom) Gerry Oakley	(United Kingdom) Geoffrey Paish	2–6, 7–5, 10–8
1954	(United Kingdom) Mike Davies	(United Kingdom) Gerry Oakley	6–4, 6–2
1955	(Australia) Bob Howe	(United Kingdom) Roger Becker	6–3, 2–6, 6–4
1956	(Czechoslovakia) Jaroslav Drobný (2)	(United Kingdom) Gerry Oakley	6–4, 6–2
1957	(United Kingdom) Bobby Wilson	(United Kingdom) Gerry Oakley	6–4, 6–3
1958	(United Kingdom) Bobby Wilson (2)	(United Kingdom) Alan Mills	6–4, 6–4
1959	(United Kingdom) Bobby Wilson (3)	(United Kingdom) Mike Sangster	6–3, 6–4
Palace Hotel Covered Courts Championships
1960	(United Kingdom) Bobby Wilson (4)	(United Kingdom) Roger Becker	6–4, 6–2
1961	(Czechoslovakia) Jaroslav Drobný (3)	(United Kingdom) Mike Sangster	6–2, 3–6, 6–4
1962	(United Kingdom) Bobby Wilson (5)	(United Kingdom) Tony Pickard	6–3, 6–2
1963	(South Africa) Keith Diepraam	(United Kingdom) Bobby Wilson	6–3, 6–4
1964	(United Kingdom) Roger Taylor	(United Kingdom) Mike Sangster	11–9, 16–14
1965	(United Kingdom) Keith Wooldridge	(United Kingdom) Bobby Wilson	4–6, 6–3, ret.
1966	(United Kingdom) Keith Wooldridge (2)	(United Kingdom) John Clifton	5–7, 6–2, 6–1
1967	(United Kingdom) Bobby Wilson (6)	(United Kingdom) Mike Sangster	8–6, 6–2
↓ Open Era ↓
Dewar Cup Torquay
1968	(South Africa) Bob Hewitt	(Australia) Owen Davidson	6–3, 6–4
1969	(United Kingdom) Mark Cox	(United Kingdom) John Clifton	8-6 6-3
1970	(Czechoslovakia) Vladimir Zednik	(United Kingdom) Paul Raymond Hutchins	6–3, 6–3
1971	(South Africa) Bob Hewitt (2)	(United Kingdom) Gerald Battrick	3–6, 6–1, 6–2
1972	(South Africa) Ray Moore	(South Africa) Pat Cramer	6–3, 6–3
Slazenger Torquay Open
1974	(United Kingdom) David Lloyd	(United Kingdom) Mark Farrell	6–7, 6–4, 6–2
1975	(United Kingdom) Mark Cox	(United Kingdom) Richard Lewis	6–3, 6–3
1976	(United Kingdom) David Lloyd (2)	(United Kingdom) Martin Robinson)	7–5, 6–3
1977	(United Kingdom) Clive Rothwell	(Netherlands) Theo Gorter	6–3, 7–6
1978	(United Kingdom) Jonathan Smith	(United Kingdom) John Whiteford	2–6, 7–6, 6–3

=== Women's singles ===
Year	Champions	Runners-up	Score
Palace Hotel Covered Courts
1936	(Chile) Anita Lizana	(United Kingdom) Dorothy Round	8–10, 6–1, 6–1
1937	(United Kingdom) Freda James	(United Kingdom) Billie Yorke	4–6, 6–1, 6–3
1938	(United Kingdom) Mary Hardwick	(United Kingdom) Nina Brown	6–2, 6–4
1939– 1947	Not held (due to World War II)		
1948	(United Kingdom) Joan Curry	(United Kingdom) Betty Clements Hilton	6–1, 6–3
1949	(United Kingdom) Joan Curry (2)	(United Kingdom) Jean Bridger Walker-Smith	6–2, 3–6, 6–2
1950	(United Kingdom) Joan Curry (3)	(United Kingdom) Jean Bridger Walker-Smith	walkover
1951	(United Kingdom) Susan Partridge	(United Kingdom) Jean Bridger Walker-Smith	6–4, 6–3
1952	(United Kingdom) Angela Mortimer	(United Kingdom) Joan Curry	6–3, 6–1
1953	(United Kingdom) Angela Mortimer (2)	(United Kingdom) Georgie Woodgate	6–1, 6–1
1954	(United Kingdom) Angela Mortimer (3)	(United Kingdom) Shirley Bloomer	6–2, 6–1
1955	(United Kingdom) Angela Mortimer (4)	(United Kingdom) Angela Buxton	6–2, 6–2
1956	(Australia) Thelma Coyne Long	(United Kingdom) Angela Buxton	6–4, 4–6, 7–5
1957	(United Kingdom) Joan Curry	(United Kingdom) Rita Bentley	6–2, 10–8
1958	(United Kingdom) Angela Mortimer (5)	(United Kingdom) Ann Haydon	6–1, 6–0
1959	(United Kingdom) Angela Mortimer (6)	(United Kingdom) Ann Haydon	7-5, 6–3
Palace Hotel Covered Courts Championships
1960	(United Kingdom) Ann Haydon	(United Kingdom) Angela Mortimer	6–4, 6–2
1961	(United Kingdom) Angela Mortimer (7)	(United Kingdom) Deidre Catt	6–1, 6–2
1962	(United Kingdom) Angela Mortimer (8)	(United Kingdom) Ann Haydon Jones	7–5, 6–3
1963	(United Kingdom) Deidre Catt	(United Kingdom) Ann Haydon Jones	6–3, 8–6
1964	(United Kingdom) Ann Haydon Jones (2)	(United Kingdom) Deidre Catt	6–3, 7–5
1965	(United Kingdom) Ann Haydon Jones (3)	(Australia) Pat McClenaughan Faulkner	6–1, 6–1
1966	(United Kingdom) Joyce Barclay Williams	(United Kingdom) Ann Haydon Jones	6–4, 5–5, retired
1967	(United Kingdom) Virginia Wade	(United Kingdom) Ann Haydon Jones	6–2, 12–14, 6–2
↓ Open Era ↓
Dewar Cup Torquay
1968	(Australia) Margaret Smith Court	(United Kingdom) Virginia Wade	12–10, 8–6
1969	(United States) Julie Heldman	(United Kingdom) Virginia Wade	4–6, 8–6, 6–3
1970	(United Kingdom) Ann Haydon Jones (4)	(United Kingdom) Virginia Wade	6–4, 7–5
1971	(Australia) Evonne Goolagong	(France) Françoise Dürr	6–1, 6–0
1972	(Australia) Margaret Smith Court (2)	(United Kingdom) Virginia Wade	2–6, 6–3, 6–1
Slazenger Torquay Open
1974	(United Kingdom) Ann Haydon Jones (5)	(United States) Janet Newberry	7–5, 7–6
1975	(United Kingdom) Ann Haydon Jones (6)	(United Kingdom) Winnie Shaw Wooldridge	4–6, 6–1, 6–3
1976	(United Kingdom) Sue Barker	(United Kingdom) Michele Tyler	6–4, 6–2

== Sources ==
- Hedges, Martin (1978). The concise dictionary of tennis. New York: Mayflower Books. ISBN 0-86124-012-X.
- The New York Times. The New York Times Company.
- Wechsler, Bob (2008). Day by Day in Jewish Sports History. New York: KTAV Publishing House, Inc. ISBN 978-0-88125-969-8.
- WTA, ATP (2005). Official Guide to Professional Tennis 2005. New York: Sport Media Publishing. ISBN 978-1-894963-41-1.
