= Ernest Pooley =

British barrister and arts administrator (1876–1966)

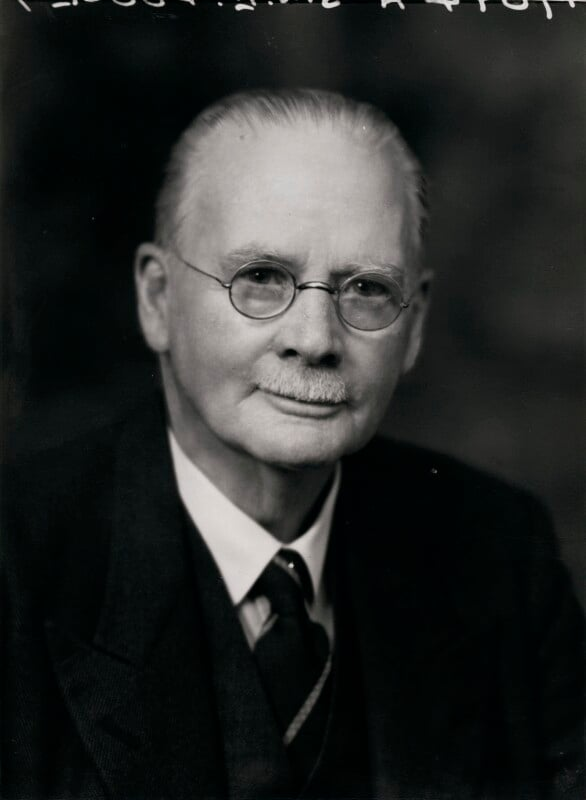
Pooley in 1954

Sir Ernest Henry Pooley, 1st Baronet GCVO (20 November 1876 – 13 February 1966) was a British barrister and arts administrator.

Pooley was born on 20 November 1876 in Paddington, London. He was educated at Winchester College and Pembroke College, Cambridge and called to the bar in 1901.

In 1905, he became a clerk to the Drapers Company for which he was knighted in 1932 and made a Knight Commander of the Royal Victorian Order (KCVO) in 1943. From 1946 to 1953, he was Chairman of the Arts Council of Great Britain. He was created a baronet, of Westbrook House in the Parish of Tillington in the County of Sussex, in January 1953. He was further honoured when he was made a Knight Grand Cross of the Royal Victorian Order (GCVO) in 1956. He published The Guilds Of The City Of London in 1947. Pooley died in February 1966, aged 89, when the baronetcy became extinct.

In the First World War Pooley served in the Royal Navy Volunteer Reserve and the Royal Garrison Artillery, fighting in both France and Gallipoli.

Cultural offices
Preceded by The Lord Keynes	Chairman of the Arts Council of Great Britain; 1946–1953	Succeeded by Kenneth Clark
Baronetage of the United Kingdom
New creation	Baronet (of Westbrook House); 1953–1966	Extinct
